= 1992–93 Dallas Mavericks season =

NBA professional basketball team season

- Head coach: Richie Adubato (fired); Gar Heard (interim)
- General manager: Norm Sonju
- Owner: Don Carter
- Arena: Reunion Arena

Results
- Record: 11–71 (.134)
- Place: Division: 6th (Midwest); Conference: 13th (Western)
- Playoff finish: Did not qualify
- Stats at Basketball Reference

Local media
- Television: KTVT; Home Sports Entertainment
- Radio: WBAP

The 1992–93 Dallas Mavericks season was the 13th season for the Dallas Mavericks in the National Basketball Association.

== Season summary ==
=== Off-season ===
The Mavericks received the fourth overall pick in the 1992 NBA draft, and selected shooting guard Jim Jackson out of Ohio State University, and also selected center Sean Rooks from the University of Arizona with the 30th overall pick. However, Jackson held out most of his rookie season due to a contract dispute, and refused to play for the Mavericks, while Fat Lever missed the entire regular season due to a knee injury. During the off-season, the team signed free agents, rookie shooting guard Walter Bond and rookie small forward Dexter Cambridge.

For the season, the Mavericks slightly updated their primary logo; the team changed the wordmark of the city and team name, next to a navy blue letter "M" with a white outline, wearing a white cowboy hat with a navy blue outline in front of a green basketball with white seams. The team also redesigned their home and road uniforms; the white home uniforms featured an updated wordmark of the team name "Mavericks" on the front of their jerseys, while the road uniforms were changed from green to blue, and featured an updated wordmark of the city name "Dallas" on the front of their jerseys.

The team's updated logo, and new uniforms would both remain in use until 2001.

=== Regular season ===
With the absence of Jackson and Lever along with the addition of Rooks, the Mavericks got off to a 1–3 start to the regular season, then posted a 12-game losing streak between November and December. The team suffered a 15-game losing streak between December and January, posted an eight-game losing streak between January and February, and then suffered a dreadful 19-game losing streak between February and March, which left them with the worst record in NBA history as they stood 4–57 through 61 games. Head coach Richie Adubato was fired after a 2–27 start, and was replaced with assistant coach Gar Heard as an interim coach. The team held a 4–45 record at the All-Star break during their 19-game losing streak.

However, Jackson finally signed with the Mavericks in early March, and played in the final 28 games of the regular season. In February, the team signed free agent and former Mavericks guard Morlon Wiley, who was previously released by the Atlanta Hawks, then in March signed free agent Tim Legler, who was previously released by the Utah Jazz. In the final 21 games, Jackson helped the team to seven wins, including two straight victories to close the season. However, the Mavericks still finished in last place in the Midwest Division with the league's worst record at 11–71, which was .134 in winning percentage, and the team's worst record in franchise history.

Derek Harper averaged 18.2 points, 5.4 assists and 1.3 steals per game, and led the Mavericks with 101 three-point field goals, while Jackson averaged 16.3 points, 4.7 assists and 1.4 steals per game, but was not named to an NBA All-Rookie Team at season's end, and Rooks provided the team with 13.5 points and 7.4 rebounds per game. In addition, Terry Davis provided with 12.7 points and 9.3 rebounds per game, while second-year forward Doug Smith contributed 10.4 points and 5.4 rebounds per game, and Randy White averaged 9.7 points and 5.8 rebounds per game. Meanwhile, Legler contributed 9.6 points per game in 30 games, second-year guard Mike Iuzzolino provided with 8.7 points and 4.7 assists per game, and Bond averaged 8.0 points per game. Cambridge averaged 7.0 points and 3.2 rebounds per game, while second-year forward Brian Howard averaged 6.5 points and 3.1 rebounds per game, Wiley contributed 5.8 points and 3.0 assists per game in 33 games, and second-year center Donald Hodge provided with 5.0 points and 3.7 rebounds per game.

The 1992–93 Mavericks also had by far the worst average point differential in the history of the NBA at -15.2 points per game – over three points worse than the 1972–73 76ers who won only nine games, and over five points worse than the 2015–16 76ers who won ten. For this reason, NBA historian Kyle Wright declared in 2007 that the 1992–93 Mavericks must rank as, at least relative to their opponents, the worst team in the history of the NBA.

The Mavericks finished 21st in the NBA in home-game attendance, with an attendance of 554,724 at the Reunion Arena during the regular season.

=== Aftermath ===
Following the season, Heard was fired as head coach, and Iuzzolino signed as a free agent with the Orlando Magic, but was later on released to free agency.

== Draft picks ==
| Round | Pick | Player | Position | Nationality | College |
|---|---|---|---|---|---|
| 1 | 4 | Jim Jackson | SG/SF | United States | Ohio State |
| 2 | 30 | Sean Rooks | PF/C | United States | Arizona |

== Roster ==
1992–93 Dallas Mavericks roster
Players

| Pos. | No. | Player | Height | Weight | DOB | From |
|---|---|---|---|---|---|---|
| G | 40 | Walter Bond | 6 ft 5 in (1.96 m) | 200 lb (91 kg) | 1968–04–05 | Minnesota |
| F | 30 | Dexter Cambridge | 6 ft 7 in (2.01 m) | 224 lb (102 kg) | 1970–01–29 | Texas |
| C | 44 | Radisav Ćurčić | 6 ft 10 in (2.08 m) | 275 lb (125 kg) | 1965–09–26 | Serbia |
| F | 43 | Terry Davis | 6 ft 9 in (2.06 m) | 225 lb (102 kg) | 1967–06–17 | Virginia Union |
| G | 12 | Derek Harper | 6 ft 4 in (1.93 m) | 185 lb (84 kg) | 1961–10–13 | Illinois |
| C | 35 | Donald Hodge | 7 ft 0 in (2.13 m) | 230 lb (104 kg) | 1969–02–25 | Temple |
| F | 41 | Brian Howard | 6 ft 6 in (1.98 m) | 204 lb (93 kg) | 1967–10–19 | NC State |
| G | 13 | Mike Iuzzolino | 5 ft 10 in (1.78 m) | 175 lb (79 kg) | 1968–01–22 | Saint Francis (PA) |
| F | 24 | Jim Jackson | 6 ft 6 in (1.98 m) | 220 lb (100 kg) | 1970–10–14 | Ohio State |
| G | 23 | Tim Legler | 6 ft 4 in (1.93 m) | 200 lb (91 kg) | 1966–12–26 | La Salle |
| G | 21 | Fat Lever (injured) (IN) | 6 ft 3 in (1.91 m) | 170 lb (77 kg) | 1960–08–18 | Arizona State |
| C | 45 | Sean Rooks | 6 ft 10 in (2.08 m) | 250 lb (113 kg) | 1969–09–09 | Arizona |
| F | 34 | Doug Smith | 6 ft 10 in (2.08 m) | 220 lb (100 kg) | 1969–09–17 | Missouri |
| F | 52 | Randy White | 6 ft 8 in (2.03 m) | 240 lb (109 kg) | 1967–11–04 | Louisiana Tech |
| G | 20 | Morlon Wiley | 6 ft 4 in (1.93 m) | 185 lb (84 kg) | 1966–09–24 | Long Beach State |

Coaches
Head coach
- Gar Heard
Assistant(s)
- Brad Davis
- Clifford Ray
- Bob Zuffelato

Legend
- (DP) Unsigned draft pick
- (FA) Free agent
- (S) Suspended
- (IN) Inactive
- Injured

Roster
Updated: March 22, 1993

=== Roster notes ===
- Shooting guard Fat Lever was on the injured reserve list due to a knee injury, and missed the entire regular season.

== Regular season ==
=== Season standings ===
| Midwest Division | W | L | PCT | GB | Home | Road | Div |
|---|---|---|---|---|---|---|---|
| y-Houston Rockets | 55 | 27 | .671 | — | 31–10 | 24–17 | 19–7 |
| x-San Antonio Spurs | 49 | 33 | .598 | 6 | 31–10 | 18–23 | 17–9 |
| x-Utah Jazz | 47 | 35 | .573 | 8 | 28–13 | 19–22 | 16–10 |
| Denver Nuggets | 36 | 46 | .439 | 19 | 28–13 | 8–33 | 13–13 |
| Minnesota Timberwolves | 19 | 63 | .232 | 36 | 11–30 | 8–33 | 10–16 |
| Dallas Mavericks | 11 | 71 | .134 | 44 | 7–34 | 4–37 | 3–23 |

y - clinched division title
x - clinched playoff spot

| # | Western Conference | | | | |
| # | Team | W | L | PCT | GB |
|---|---|---|---|---|---|
| 1 | z-Phoenix Suns | 62 | 20 | .756 | – |
| 2 | y-Houston Rockets | 55 | 27 | .671 | 7 |
| 3 | x-Seattle SuperSonics | 55 | 27 | .671 | 7 |
| 4 | x-Portland Trail Blazers | 51 | 31 | .622 | 11 |
| 5 | x-San Antonio Spurs | 49 | 33 | .598 | 13 |
| 6 | x-Utah Jazz | 47 | 35 | .573 | 15 |
| 7 | x-Los Angeles Clippers | 41 | 41 | .500 | 21 |
| 8 | x-Los Angeles Lakers | 39 | 43 | .476 | 23 |
| 9 | Denver Nuggets | 36 | 46 | .439 | 26 |
| 10 | Golden State Warriors | 34 | 48 | .415 | 28 |
| 11 | Sacramento Kings | 25 | 57 | .305 | 37 |
| 12 | Minnesota Timberwolves | 19 | 63 | .232 | 43 |
| 13 | Dallas Mavericks | 11 | 71 | .134 | 51 |

z - clinched division title
y - clinched division title
x - clinched playoff spot

=== Game log ===
1992–93 game log
Total: 11–71 (Home: 7–34; Road: 4–37)
November: 1–9 (home: 1–5; road: 0–4)

| Game | Date | Team | Score | High points | High rebounds | High assists | Location Attendance | Record |
|---|---|---|---|---|---|---|---|---|
| 1 | November 7 | Utah | L 106–122 | Derek Harper (26) | Mike Iuzzolino (6) | Derek Harper (9) | Reunion Arena; 12,514 | 0–1 |
| 2 | November 10 | @ Minnesota | L 104–118 | Walter Bond (25) | Smith, Moore, & Hodge (6) | Mike Iuzzolino (6) | Target Center; 18,202 | 0–2 |
| 3 | November 11 | Milwaukee | L 116–124 | Derek Harper (21) | Terry Davis (11) | Mike Iuzzolino (5) | Reunion Arena; 11,276 | 0–3 |
| 4 | November 14 | Atlanta | W 113–105 | Terry Davis (35) | Terry Davis (17) | Derek Harper (7) | Reunion Arena; 13,488 | 1–3 |

December: 1–13 (home: 1–5; road: 0–8)

| Game | Date | Team | Score | High points | High rebounds | High assists | Location Attendance | Record |

January: 0–0 (home: 0–0; road: 0–0)

| Game | Date | Team | Score | High points | High rebounds | High assists | Location Attendance | Record |

February: 0–0 (home: 0–0; road: 0–0)

| Game | Date | Team | Score | High points | High rebounds | High assists | Location Attendance | Record |

March: 0–0 (home: 0–0; road: 0–0)

| Game | Date | Team | Score | High points | High rebounds | High assists | Location Attendance | Record |

April: 0–0 (home: 0–0; road: 0–0)

| Game | Date | Team | Score | High points | High rebounds | High assists | Location Attendance | Record |

1992–93 schedule

== Player statistics ==
=== Ragular season ===
| Player | POS | GP | GS | MP | REB | AST | STL | BLK | PTS | MPG | RPG | APG | SPG | BPG | PPG |
|---|---|---|---|---|---|---|---|---|---|---|---|---|---|---|---|
| Donald Hodge | C | 79 | 8 | 1,267 | 294 | 75 | 33 | 37 | 393 | 16.0 | 3.7 | .9 | .4 | .5 | 5.0 |
| Terry Davis | PF | 75 | 74 | 2,462 | 701 | 68 | 36 | 28 | 955 | 32.8 | 9.3 | .9 | .5 | .4 | 12.7 |
| Walter Bond | SG | 74 | 38 | 1,578 | 196 | 122 | 75 | 18 | 590 | 21.3 | 2.6 | 1.6 | 1.0 | .2 | 8.0 |
| Sean Rooks | C | 72 | 68 | 2,087 | 536 | 95 | 38 | 81 | 970 | 29.0 | 7.4 | 1.3 | .5 | 1.1 | 13.5 |
| Mike Iuzzolino | PG | 70 | 23 | 1,769 | 140 | 328 | 49 | 6 | 610 | 25.3 | 2.0 | 4.7 | .7 | .1 | 8.7 |
| Brian Howard | SF | 68 | 22 | 1,295 | 212 | 67 | 55 | 34 | 439 | 19.0 | 3.1 | 1.0 | .8 | .5 | 6.5 |
| Randy White | PF | 64 | 20 | 1,433 | 370 | 49 | 63 | 45 | 618 | 22.4 | 5.8 | .8 | 1.0 | .7 | 9.7 |
| Derek Harper | SG | 62 | 60 | 2,108 | 123 | 334 | 80 | 16 | 1,126 | 34.0 | 2.0 | 5.4 | 1.3 | .3 | 18.2 |
| Doug Smith | PF | 61 | 42 | 1,524 | 328 | 104 | 48 | 52 | 634 | 25.0 | 5.4 | 1.7 | .8 | .9 | 10.4 |
| Dexter Cambridge | SF | 53 | 13 | 885 | 167 | 58 | 24 | 6 | 370 | 16.7 | 3.2 | 1.1 | .5 | .1 | 7.0 |
| Tracy Moore | SG | 39 | 1 | 510 | 52 | 47 | 21 | 4 | 282 | 13.1 | 1.3 | 1.2 | .5 | .1 | 7.2 |
| Morlon Wiley^{†} | PG | 33 | 13 | 641 | 56 | 100 | 39 | 1 | 191 | 19.4 | 1.7 | 3.0 | 1.2 | .0 | 5.8 |
| Tim Legler^{†} | SG | 30 | 0 | 630 | 58 | 46 | 24 | 6 | 287 | 21.0 | 1.9 | 1.5 | .8 | .2 | 9.6 |
| Jim Jackson | SF | 28 | 28 | 938 | 122 | 131 | 40 | 11 | 457 | 33.5 | 4.4 | 4.7 | 1.4 | .4 | 16.3 |
| Stephen Bardo | SG | 23 | 0 | 175 | 37 | 29 | 8 | 3 | 51 | 7.6 | 1.6 | 1.3 | .3 | .1 | 2.2 |
| Radisav Ćurčić | C | 20 | 0 | 166 | 49 | 12 | 7 | 2 | 58 | 8.3 | 2.5 | .6 | .4 | .1 | 2.9 |
| Walter Palmer | C | 20 | 0 | 124 | 44 | 5 | 1 | 5 | 60 | 6.2 | 2.2 | .3 | .1 | .3 | 3.0 |
| Lamont Strothers | SG | 9 | 0 | 138 | 14 | 13 | 8 | 0 | 50 | 15.3 | 1.6 | 1.4 | .9 | .0 | 5.6 |

- ^{†} Denotes player spent time with another team in the season. Stats reflect time with the Mavericks only.

== See also ==
- 1992-93 NBA season
