= 1992–93 Los Angeles Lakers season =

NBA professional basketball team season

- Head coach: Randy Pfund
- General manager: Jerry West
- Owner: Jerry Buss
- Arena: Great Western Forum

Results
- Record: 39–43 (.476)
- Place: Division: 5th (Pacific); Conference: 8th (Western)
- Playoff finish: First round (lost to the Phoenix Suns 2–3)
- Stats at Basketball Reference

Local media
- Television: KCAL-TV; Prime Sports West
- Radio: KLAC

The 1992–93 Los Angeles Lakers season was the 45th season for the Los Angeles Lakers in the National Basketball Association, and their 33rd season in Los Angeles, California.

== Season summary ==
=== Off-season ===
The Lakers had the 15th overall pick in the 1992 NBA draft, and selected shooting guard Anthony Peeler from the University of Missouri. During the off-season, the team signed free agent James Edwards, who won two NBA championships with the Detroit Pistons between 1989 and 1990, and hired Randy Pfund as their new head coach.

After playing in the 1992 Summer Olympics in Barcelona, Spain, All-Star guard Magic Johnson made a brief comeback and played with the Lakers during the preseason. However, shortly before the regular season began, he was forced to retire again after other NBA players expressed fear of playing against him due to his HIV infection, most notably All-Star forward Karl Malone of the Utah Jazz.

=== Regular season ===
Under Pfund and with the addition of Peeler, the Lakers got off to a 13–6 start to the regular season, and continued to play above .500 in winning percentage with a 26–23 record at the All-Star break. At mid-season, the team traded Sam Perkins to the Seattle SuperSonics in exchange for Benoit Benjamin, and rookie shooting guard, and first-round draft pick Doug Christie out of Pepperdine University. However, the Lakers struggled playing below .500 for the remainder of the season, losing 11 of 12 games between March 17 and April 9, 1993. The Lakers finished in fifth place in the Pacific Division with a 39–43 record, and earned the eighth seed in the Western Conference; it was their worst record since the 1974–75 season, as the team qualified for the NBA playoffs for the 17th consecutive year.

Sedale Threatt averaged 15.1 points, 6.9 assists and 1.7 steals per game, while James Worthy finished second on the team in scoring averaging 14.9 points per game, and Byron Scott contributed 13.7 points per game. In addition, Vlade Divac provided the team with 12.8 points, 8.9 rebounds, 1.6 steals and 1.7 blocks per game, while A.C. Green provided with 12.8 points and 8.7 rebounds per game. Off the bench, Peeler contributed 10.4 points per game, while Elden Campbell averaged 7.7 points, 4.2 rebounds and 1.3 blocks per game, Edwards provided with 6.3 points per game, Christie averaged 6.2 points per game in 23 games after the trade, and Tony Smith contributed 6.0 points per game.

The Lakers finished 13th in the NBA in home-game attendance, with an attendance of 633,655 at the Great Western Forum during the regular season.

=== NBA playoffs ===
In the Western Conference First Round of the 1993 NBA playoffs, the Lakers faced off against the top–seeded, and Pacific Division champion Phoenix Suns, who were led by the All-Star trio of Most Valuable Player of the Year, Charles Barkley, three-point specialist Dan Majerle, and Kevin Johnson. Prior to the playoffs, the Lakers replaced Worthy in the starting lineup with Campbell, as Worthy played a sixth man role off the bench for the final 13 games of the regular season, and for the team's first-round series against the Suns; the Lakers were also without Peeler, who was out due to a season-ending right ankle injury.

The Lakers managed to win the first two games over the Suns on the road, which included a Game 2 win at the America West Arena, 86–81. However, the Lakers lost the next two games at home at the Great Western Forum, including a Game 4 loss to the Suns by a score of 101–86. With the series tied at 2–2, the Lakers lost Game 5 to the Suns at the America West Arena in overtime, 112–104, thus losing in a hard-fought five-game series.

The Suns would advance to the 1993 NBA Finals, but would lose to the 2-time defending NBA champion Chicago Bulls in six games.

=== Aftermath ===
Following the season, Green signed as a free agent with the Phoenix Suns, while Scott signed with the Indiana Pacers during the next season, and Benjamin was traded to the New Jersey Nets.

== Draft picks ==
Round	Pick	Player	Position	Nationality	College
1	15	Anthony Peeler	SG	United States	Missouri
2	36	Duane Cooper	PG	United States	Southern California

== Roster ==
1992–93 Los Angeles Lakers roster
Players

Pos.	No.	Player	Height	Weight	DOB	From
C	00	Benoit Benjamin	7 ft 0 in (2.13 m)	250 lb (113 kg)	1964–11–22	Creighton
PF	30	Alex Blackwell	6 ft 6 in (1.98 m)	250 lb (113 kg)	1970–06–27	Monmouth
PF	41	Elden Campbell	6 ft 11 in (2.11 m)	215 lb (98 kg)	1968–07–23	Clemson
SG	35	Doug Christie	6 ft 6 in (1.98 m)	200 lb (91 kg)	1970–05–09	Pepperdine
PG	5	Duane Cooper	6 ft 1 in (1.85 m)	185 lb (84 kg)	1969–06–25	USC
C	12	Vlade Divac	7 ft 1 in (2.16 m)	243 lb (110 kg)	1968–02–03	FR Yugoslavia
C	53	James Edwards	7 ft 0 in (2.13 m)	225 lb (102 kg)	1955–11–22	Washington
PF	45	A.C. Green	6 ft 9 in (2.06 m)	220 lb (100 kg)	1963–10–04	Oregon State
SG	1	Anthony Peeler	6 ft 4 in (1.93 m)	208 lb (94 kg)	1969–11–25	Missouri
SG	4	Byron Scott	6 ft 3 in (1.91 m)	195 lb (88 kg)	1961–03–28	Arizona State
SG	34	Tony Smith	6 ft 3 in (1.91 m)	185 lb (84 kg)	1968–06–14	Marquette
PG	3	Sedale Threatt	6 ft 2 in (1.88 m)	175 lb (79 kg)	1961–09–10	West Virginia Tech
SF	42	James Worthy	6 ft 9 in (2.06 m)	225 lb (102 kg)	1961–02–27	North Carolina

Coaches
Head coach
- Randy Pfund
Assistant(s)
- Bill Bertka
- Larry Drew
- Chet Kammerer

Legend
- (DP) Unsigned draft pick
- (FA) Free agent
- (S) Suspended
- Injured

== Regular season ==
=== Season standings ===
Pacific Division	W	L	PCT	GB	Home	Road	Div
y-Phoenix Suns	62	20	.756	—	35–6	27–14	21–9
x-Seattle SuperSonics	55	27	.671	7	33–8	22–19	22–8
x-Portland Trail Blazers	51	31	.622	11	30–11	21–20	19–11
x-Los Angeles Clippers	41	41	.500	21	27–14	14–27	15–15
x-Los Angeles Lakers	39	43	.476	23	20–21	19–22	13–17
Golden State Warriors	34	48	.415	28	19–22	15–26	9–21
Sacramento Kings	25	57	.305	37	16–25	9–32	6–24

#	Western Conference				
#	Team	W	L	PCT	GB
1	z-Phoenix Suns	62	20	.756	–
2	y-Houston Rockets	55	27	.671	7
3	x-Seattle SuperSonics	55	27	.671	7
4	x-Portland Trail Blazers	51	31	.622	11
5	x-San Antonio Spurs	49	33	.598	13
6	x-Utah Jazz	47	35	.573	15
7	x-Los Angeles Clippers	41	41	.500	21
8	x-Los Angeles Lakers	39	43	.476	23
9	Denver Nuggets	36	46	.439	26
10	Golden State Warriors	34	48	.415	28
11	Sacramento Kings	25	57	.305	37
12	Minnesota Timberwolves	19	63	.232	43
13	Dallas Mavericks	11	71	.134	51

z – clinched division title
y – clinched division title
x – clinched playoff spot

== Game log ==
=== Regular season ===
1992–93 game log
Total: 39–43 (home: 20–21; road: 19–22)
November: 7–4 (home: 4–3; road: 3–1)

Game	Date	Team	Score	High points	High rebounds	High assists	Location Attendance	Record
1	November 6	@ L.A. Clippers	W 114-112 (OT)	Byron Scott (29)	Sam Perkins (10)	Sedale Threatt (11)	Los Angeles Memorial Sports Arena; 15,989	1–0
2	November 8	Sacramento	L 114-121	James Worthy (30)	Elden Campbell (9)	Sedale Threatt (9)	Great Western Forum; 15,021	1-1
3	November 10	@ Golden State	W 107-106	Sedale Threatt (26)	Vlade Divac (10)	Byron Scott (6)	Oakland-Alameda County Coliseum Arena; 15,025	2–1
4	November 12	@ Seattle	L 102-114	Sedale Threatt (25)	Divac & Threatt (7)	Sedale Threatt (8)	Seattle Center Coliseum; 14,419	2-2
5	November 13	L.A. Clippers	L 98-124	Divac & Scott (17)	Sam Perkins (9)	Sedale Threatt (5)	Great Western Forum; 14,555	2–3
6	November 15	Golden State	W 105-102	Sedale Threatt (24)	Sam Perkins (9)	Sedale Threatt (7)	Great Western Forum; 13,941	3-3
7	November 20, 1992; 7:30 p.m. PST	Chicago	W 120–118 (OT)	Perkins (26)	Perkins (15)	Threatt, Worthy (8)	Great Western Forum; 17,505	4–3
8	November 22	Denver	W 119-107	Sedale Threatt (32)	Sam Perkins (9)	Sedale Threatt (9)	Great Western Forum; 13,841	5–3
9	November 25	New Jersey	L 98-100	Tony Smith (17)	Vlade Divac (14)	Sedale Threatt (10)	Great Western Forum; 13,860	5–4
10	November 27	@ Portland	W 98-90	James Worthy (19)	Sam Perkins (9)	James Worthy (7)	Memorial Coliseum; 12,888	6–4
11	November 29	Dallas	W 114-95	Vlade Divac (20)	A.C. Green (14)	Sedale Threatt (6)	Great Western Forum; 13,855	7–4

December: 8–7 (home: 4–3; road: 4–4)

Game	Date	Team	Score	High points	High rebounds	High assists	Location Attendance	Record
12	December 1	@ Sacramento	L 110-117	Sedale Threatt (26)	Vlade Divac (10)	James Edwards (5)	ARCO Arena; 17,317	7–5
13	December 3	@ Houston	W 95-89	Sam Perkins (21)	Sam Perkins (13)	Sedale Threatt (7)	The Summit; 10,902	8–5
14	December 4, 1992; 6:30 p.m. PST	@ Phoenix	L 93-103	Perkins (25)	DIvac (7)	Divac (8)	American West Arena; 19,023	8–6
15	December 6	Minnesota	W 107-85	Sedale Threatt (19)	Vlade Divac (12)	Peeler & Threatt (5)	Great Western Forum; 14,068	9–6
16	December 9	Portland	W 124-111	Sedale Threatt (26)	Sam Perkins (11)	James Worthy (12)	Great Western Forum; 15,133	10–6
17	December 11	Washington	W 118-93	Sam Perkins (25)	Vlade Divac (12)	Sedale Threatt (8)	Great Western Forum; 13,618	11–6
18	December 13	Milwaukee	W 114-96	Anthony Peeler (21)	A.C. Green (12)	Sedale Threatt (9)	Great Western Forum; 13,265	12–6
19	December 15	@ San Antonio	W 107-101	Sedale Threatt (24)	A.C. Green (8)	Sedale Threatt (9)	HemisFair Arena; 16,057	13–6
20	December 16	@ Dallas	L 95-102	Sedale Threatt (23)	Vlade Divac (9)	James Worthy (6)	Reunion Arena; 13,358	13–7
21	December 18, 1992; 7:30 p.m. PST	Phoenix	L 100-116	Smith, Threatt (16)	Divac (10)	Threatt (5)	Great Western Forum; 16,734	13–8
22	December 19	@ Denver	W 92-86	Sedale Threatt (27)	Vlade Divac (14)	Sam Perkins (4)	McNichols Sports Arena; 17,022	14–8
23	December 23	Seattle	L 79-80	Peeler & Worthy (16)	Vlade Divac (13)	Sedale Threatt (5)	Great Western Forum; 14,754	14–9
24	December 26	San Antonio	L 92-104	James Edwards (16)	Green & Smith (5)	James Worthy (7)	Great Western Forum; 17,505	14–10
25	December 28	@ Miami	L 96-107	James Worthy (26)	Divac & Perkins (7)	Threatt & Worthy (5)	Miami Arena; 15,008	14–11
26	December 30	@ Orlando	W 96-93	Sam Perkins (21)	Sedale Threatt (7)	Sedale Threatt (11)	Orlando Arena; 15,151	15–11

January: 7–9 (home: 2–3; road: 5–6)

Game	Date	Team	Score	High points	High rebounds	High assists	Location Attendance	Record
27	January 2	@ Cleveland	L 91-106	Vlade Divac (18)	Vlade Divac (15)	Scott & Threatt (5)	Richfield Coliseum; 20,273	15–12
28	January 3	@ Milwaukee	L 101-109	Vlade Divac (21)	Sam Perkins (15)	Sedale Threatt (6)	Bradley Center; 15,881	15–13
29	January 5, 1993; 5:00 p.m. PST	@ Chicago	W 91–88	Worthy (21)	Green (15)	Peeler (6)	Chicago Stadium; 18,676	16–13
30	January 6	@ Minnesota	W 98-78	A.C. Green (17)	Divac & Green (9)	Threatt & Worthy (7)	Target Center; 18,494	17–13
31	January 8	Sacramento	W 93-90	James Worthy (25)	Vlade Divac (16)	Sedale Threatt (10)	Great Western Forum; 15,066	18–13
32	January 10	Miami	L 89-101	Vlade Divac (24)	Vlade Divac (12)	Duane Cooper (5)	Great Western Forum; 14,956	18–14
33	January 14	@ L.A. Clippers	L 102-105	Sam Perkins (16)	A.C. Green (10)	Sedale Threatt (6)	Los Angeles Memorial Sports Arena; 15,356	18–15
34	January 15	Portland	W 99-96	Sedale Threatt (22)	A.C. Green (13)	Byron Scott (5)	Great Western Forum; 17,505	19–15
35	January 18	Houston	L 90-110	James Worthy (18)	A.C. Green (11)	Sedale Threatt (8)	Great Western Forum; 15,489	19–16
36	January 20	Seattle	L 101-111	Sedale Threatt (20)	A.C. Green (12)	Cooper & Threatt (5)	Great Western Forum; 14,114	19–17
37	January 22	@ Utah	L 94-98	Sam Perkins (19)	A.C. Green (8)	Threatt & Worthy (4)	Delta Center; 19,911	19–18
38	January 24	@ Washington	W 112-110 (OT)	James Worthy (25)	A.C. Green (15)	Sam Perkins (10)	Capital Centre; 14,704	20–18
39	January 26	@ New Jersey	L 91-106	James Worthy (22)	Sam Perkins (11)	Sedale Threatt (4)	Brendan Byrne Arena; 16,467	20–19
40	January 28	@ Indiana	L 110-127	Anthony Peeler (25)	Vlade Divac (12)	Sedale Threatt (6)	Market Square Arena; 13,085	20-20
41	January 29	@ Charlotte	W 123-108	Byron Scott (27)	Vlade Divac (8)	Sedale Threatt (10)	Charlotte Coliseum; 23,698	21–20
42	January 31	@ Boston	W 96-87	Peeler & Threatt (16)	A.C. Green (12)	Sedale Threatt (7)	Boston Garden; 14,890	22–20

February: 6–4 (home: 5–2; road: 1–2)

Game	Date	Team	Score	High points	High rebounds	High assists	Location Attendance	Record
43	February 2	Orlando	L 97-110	Anthony Peeler (24)	A.C. Green (12)	Sedale Threatt (8)	Great Western Forum; 17,505	22–21
44	February 4	Utah	W 114-110	A.C. Green (23)	A.C. Green (11)	James Worthy (7)	Great Western Forum; 14,629	23–21
45	February 5, 1993; 6:30 p.m. PST	@ Phoenix	L 104-132	Green (20)	Green (15)	Threatt (6)	American West Arena; 19,023	23–22
46	February 8	Dallas	W 108-100 (OT)	Byron Scott (26)	Sam Perkins (17)	Sedale Threatt (8)	Great Western Forum; 14,202	24–22
47	February 10	Denver	W 111-102	James Worthy (21)	Sam Perkins (10)	Sedale Threatt (7)	Great Western Forum; 14,351	25–22
48	February 14	Atlanta	W 135-96	Byron Scott (24)	Vlade Divac (13)	Duane Cooper (11)	Great Western Forum; 16,219	26–22
49	February 18	@ Portland	L 103-105	James Worthy (26)	A.C. Green (10)	Byron Scott (7)	Memorial Coliseum; 12,888	26–23
All-Star Break
50	February 24	@ Sacramento	W 104-99	Sedale Threatt (23)	A.C. Green (15)	Sedale Threatt (11)	ARCO Arena; 17,317	27–23
51	February 26	Cleveland	L 102-114	James Worthy (23)	A.C. Green (10)	Sedale Threatt (12)	Great Western Forum; 16,054	27–24
52	February 28	L.A. Clippers	W 124-112	A.C. Green (30)	Vlade Divac (12)	Sedale Threatt (13)	Great Western Forum; 16,895	28–24

March: 6–11 (home: 2–7; road: 4–4)

Game	Date	Team	Score	High points	High rebounds	High assists	Location Attendance	Record
53	March 2	@ Denver	L 115-127	Sedale Threatt (25)	A.C. Green (13)	Sedale Threatt (7)	McNichols Sports Arena; 17,022	28–25
54	March 3	@ Golden State	W 117-111	A.C. Green (24)	A.C. Green (11)	Sedale Threatt (10)	Oakland-Alameda County Coliseum Arena; 15,025	29–25
55	March 5	Philadelphia	W 101-97 (OT)	Byron Scott (22)	Vlade Divac (21)	Sedale Threatt (10)	Great Western Forum; 14,531	30–25
56	March 7	Charlotte	L 101-105	James Worthy (25)	A.C. Green (13)	Sedale Threatt (10)	Great Western Forum; 16,989	30–26
57	March 9	@ Detroit	W 123-121	James Worthy (28)	A.C. Green (17)	Sedale Threatt (15)	The Palace of Auburn Hills; 21,454	31–26
58	March 10	@ New York	L 104-110	A.C. Green (22)	Vlade Divac (14)	Divac & Threatt (5)	Madison Square Garden; 19,763	31–27
59	March 12	@ Philadelphia	W 101-95	Vlade Divac (20)	Vlade Divac (12)	Sedale Threatt (8)	The Spectrum; 16,126	32–27
60	March 14	@ Atlanta	L 107-117	James Worthy (25)	A.C. Green (13)	Sedale Threatt (6)	Omni Coliseum; 13,628	32–28
61	March 15	@ San Antonio	W 92-87	James Worthy (24)	Vlade Divac (12)	Scott & Threatt (5)	HemisFair Arena; 16,057	33–28
62	March 17	San Antonio	L 100-101	Vlade Divac (23)	Vlade Divac (9)	Sedale Threatt (10)	Great Western Forum; 15,000	33–29
63	March 19	Boston	L 119-129	Byron Scott (20)	Divac & Green (9)	Sedale Threatt (11)	Great Western Forum; 17,505	33–30
64	March 21	Detroit	L 101-106	Vlade Divac (28)	Vlade Divac (12)	Sedale Threatt (6)	Great Western Forum; 15,923	33–31
65	March 24, 1993; 7:30 p.m. PST	Phoenix	L 105-120	Worthy (16)	Divac, Green (8)	Threatt (11)	Great Western Forum; 17,505	33–32
66	March 26	New York	L 95-105	Byron Scott (18)	Elden Campbell (12)	Sedale Threatt (6)	Great Western Forum; 17,505	33-33
67	March 28	Indiana	W 92-90	Campbell & Divac (18)	Vlade Divac (13)	Vlade Divac (6)	Great Western Forum; 15,747	34–33
68	March 30	@ L.A. Clippers	L 93-101	A.C. Green (22)	Vlade Divac (12)	Sedale Threatt (8)	Los Angeles Memorial Sports Arena; 14,274	34-34
69	March 31	Minnesota	L 113-126	Sedale Threatt (22)	A.C. Green (11)	Sedale Threatt (7)	Great Western Forum; 15,350	34–35

April: 5–8 (home: 3–3; road: 2–5)

Game	Date	Team	Score	High points	High rebounds	High assists	Location Attendance	Record
70	April 4	Utah	L 99-111	Anthony Peeler (19)	Vlade Divac (10)	Sedale Threatt (8)	Great Western Forum; 15,593	34–36
71	April 6, 1993; 7:30 p.m. PDT	@ Phoenix	L 114-115	Campbell (21)	Green (13)	Cooper (4)	American West Arena; 19,023	34–37
72	April 8	@ Golden State	L 116-122 (OT)	Byron Scott (24)	Vlade Divac (9)	Sedale Threatt (9)	Oakland-Alameda County Coliseum Arena; 15,025	34–38
73	April 9	Portland	L 105-109	James Worthy (26)	Vlade Divac (17)	Anthony Peeler (8)	Great Western Forum; 15,956	34–39
74	April 11	Seattle	W 98-96	Sedale Threatt (25)	A.C. Green (11)	James Worthy (9)	Great Western Forum; 14,915	35–39
75	April 13	@ Houston	L 107-126	Vlade Divac (18)	Vlade Divac (13)	Vlade Divac (5)	The Summit; 16,611	35–40
76	April 14	@ Dallas	W 112-99	Sedale Threatt (22)	Vlade Divac (12)	Sedale Threatt (5)	Reunion Arena; 16,064	36–40
77	April 16	Houston	L 84-100	Christie & Peeler (15)	Vlade Divac (13)	Sedale Threatt (7)	Great Western Forum; 15,187	36–41
78	April 18	Golden State	W 115-112	Green & Worthy (22)	A.C. Green (14)	Sedale Threatt (11)	Great Western Forum; 14,827	37–41
79	April 20	@ Minnesota	W 107-95	A.C. Green (20)	Vlade Divac (10)	Sedale Threatt (6)	Target Center; 19,006	38–41
80	April 21	@ Utah	L 102-113	Benoit Benjamin (17)	Campbell & Christie (8)	Byron Scott (7)	Delta Center; 19,911	38–42
81	April 23	@ Seattle	L 93-122	Tony Smith (18)	Elden Campbell (8)	Duane Cooper (7)	Seattle Center Coliseum; 14,691	38–43
82	April 24	Sacramento	W 125-107	A.C. Green (26)	A.C. Green (11)	Sedale Threatt (12)	Great Western Forum; 16,482	39–43

1992–93 schedule

=== Playoffs ===
1993 playoff game log
Total: 2–3 (home: 0–2; road: 2–1)
Western Conference First Round: 2–3 (home: 0–2; road: 2–1)

Game	Date	Team	Score	High points	High rebounds	High assists	Location Attendance	Series
1	April 30, 1993; 7:30 p.m. PDT	@ Phoenix	W 107–103	Threatt (35)	Divac (10)	Threatt (7)	America West Arena; 19,023	1–0
2	May 2, 1993; 12 Noon PDT	@ Phoenix	W 86–81	Divac (19)	Divac, Green (13)	Threatt (8)	America West Arena; 19,023	2–0
3	May 4, 1993; 7:30 p.m. PDT	Phoenix	L 102–107	Divac (30)	Green (17)	Threatt (10)	Great Western Forum; 17,505	2–1
4	May 6, 1993; 7:30 p.m. PDT	Phoenix	L 86–101	Divac (17)	Green (15)	Threatt (6)	Great Western Forum; 17,505	2–2
5	May 9, 1993; 2:30 p.m. PDT	@ Phoenix	L 104–112 (OT)	Worthy (24)	Green (19)	Threatt (9)	America West Arena; 19,023	2–3

1993 schedule

== Player statistics ==
Legend
GP	Games played	GS	Games started	MPG	Minutes per game
FG%	Field-goal percentage	3P%	3-point field-goal percentage	FT%	Free-throw percentage
RPG	Rebounds per game	APG	Assists per game	SPG	Steals per game
BPG	Blocks per game	PPG	Points per game

=== Regular season ===
Los Angeles Lakers statistics
Player	GP	GS	MPG	FG%	3P%	FT%	RPG	APG	SPG	BPG	PPG
Benoit Benjamin^{†}	28	0	10.9	.481		.595	3.4	.4	.5	.5	4.5
Alex Blackwell	27	0	4.0	.333	.000	.750	.9	.3	.1	.1	1.3
Elden Campbell	79	13	19.6	.458	.000	.637	4.2	.6	.7	1.3	7.7
Doug Christie	23	0	14.4	.425	.167	.758	2.2	2.3	1.0	.2	6.2
Duane Cooper	65	0	9.9	.392	.233	.714	.8	2.3	.3	.0	2.4
Vlade Divac	82	69	30.8	.485	.280	.689	8.9	2.8	1.6	1.7	12.8
James Edwards	52	0	11.9	.452		.712	1.9	.8	.2	.1	6.3
A.C. Green	82	55	34.4	.537	.348	.739	8.7	1.4	1.1	.5	12.8
Anthony Peeler	77	11	21.5	.468	.390	.786	2.3	2.2	.8	.2	10.4
Sam Perkins^{†}	49	49	32.4	.459	.172	.829	7.7	2.6	.8	1.0	13.7
Byron Scott	58	53	28.9	.449	.326	.848	2.3	2.7	.9	.2	13.7
Tony Smith	55	9	13.7	.484	.182	.756	1.6	1.1	.9	.1	6.0
Sedale Threatt	82	82	35.3	.508	.264	.823	3.3	6.9	1.7	.1	15.1
James Worthy	82	69	28.8	.447	.270	.810	3.0	3.4	1.1	.3	14.9

=== Playoffs ===
Los Angeles Lakers statistics
Player	GP	GS	MPG	FG%	3P%	FT%	RPG	APG	SPG	BPG	PPG
Elden Campbell	5	5	35.6	.420		.500	8.4	1.4	1.2	2.4	14.0
Doug Christie	5	0	7.8	.364	.333		.8	1.2	.4	.4	1.8
Duane Cooper	2	0	2.0	.000	.000		1.0	.5	.0	.0	.0
Vlade Divac	5	5	33.4	.500	.444	.545	9.4	5.6	1.2	2.4	18.0
James Edwards	3	0	4.7	.750			.7	.0	.0	.0	2.0
A.C. Green	5	5	44.0	.429	.000	.619	14.6	2.6	1.4	.6	9.8
Byron Scott	5	5	35.4	.500	.533	.783	2.2	1.8	1.0	.0	13.6
Tony Smith	5	0	14.6	.520	.500	.667	1.6	.4	.2	.2	6.8
Sedale Threatt	5	5	41.0	.438	.231	.750	3.4	8.0	2.6	.2	18.0
James Worthy	5	0	29.6	.372	.250	.600	3.4	2.6	1.0	.0	13.8

- ^{†} Denotes player spent time with another team in the season. Stats reflect time with the Lakers only.

Player statistics citation:
