= 1992–93 Utah Jazz season =

NBA professional basketball team season

- Head coach: Jerry Sloan
- General manager: Tim Howells
- Owner: Larry H. Miller
- Arena: Delta Center

Results
- Record: 47–35 (.573)
- Place: Division: 3rd (Midwest); Conference: 6th (Western)
- Playoff finish: First round (lost to SuperSonics 2–3)
- Stats at Basketball Reference

Local media
- Television: KSTU; Prime Sports Intermountain West
- Radio: KSOP

The 1992–93 Utah Jazz season was the 19th season for the Utah Jazz in the National Basketball Association, and their 14th season in Salt Lake City, Utah. The city of Salt Lake City hosted the NBA All-Star weekend at the Delta Center this season.

== Season summary ==
=== Off-season ===
During the off-season, the Jazz acquired Jay Humphries and Larry Krystkowiak from the Milwaukee Bucks on draft day.

=== Regular season ===
With the addition of Humphries and Krystkowiak, the Jazz won six of their first eight games of the regular season. The team posted a six-game winning streak between December and January, which led to a 20–8 start to the season, and later on held a 33–18 record at the All-Star break. However, the Jazz played below .500 in winning percentage for the remainder of the season, posting a 6–8 record in February, which included a five-game losing streak between February and March. During the final month of the regular season, the team signed free agent James Donaldson, who played in the final six games. The Jazz finished in third place in the Midwest Division with a 47–35 record, and earned the sixth seed in the Western Conference; the team qualified for the NBA playoffs for the tenth consecutive year.

Karl Malone averaged 27.0 points and 11.2 rebounds per game, and was named to the All-NBA First Team, while Jeff Malone averaged 18.1 points per game, and John Stockton provided the team with 15.1 points, 12.0 assists and 2.4 steals per game, and was named to the All-NBA Second Team. In addition, Tyrone Corbin provided with 11.6 points, 6.2 rebounds and 1.3 steals per game, while Humphries contributed 8.8 points, 4.1 assists and 1.3 steals per game, and second-year forward David Benoit averaged 8.1 points and 4.8 rebounds per game. Meanwhile, Krystkowiak provided with 7.2 points and 3.9 rebounds per game, Mike Brown averaged 5.7 points and 4.8 rebounds per game, and Mark Eaton contributed 2.8 points, 4.1 rebounds and 1.2 blocks per game.

During the NBA All-Star weekend at the Delta Center in Salt Lake City, Karl Malone and Stockton were both selected for the 1993 NBA All-Star Game, as members of the Western Conference All-Star team. Karl Malone scored 28 points along with 10 rebounds and 2 blocks, while Stockton contributed 9 points, 15 assists and 2 steals; both players shared the NBA All-Star Game Most Valuable Player award, as the Western Conference defeated the Eastern Conference in overtime, 135–132. Meanwhile, Benoit participated in the NBA Slam Dunk Contest. Karl Malone finished tied in eighth place in Most Valuable Player voting, while Stockton finished tied in tenth place.

The Jazz finished third in the NBA in home-game attendance, with an attendance of 815,892 at the Delta Center during the regular season.

=== NBA playoffs ===
In the Western Conference First Round of the 1993 NBA playoffs, and for the second consecutive year, the Jazz faced off against the 3rd–seeded Seattle SuperSonics, who were led by All-Star forward Shawn Kemp, Ricky Pierce and Gary Payton. After losing Game 1 to the SuperSonics on the road, 99–85 at the Seattle Center Coliseum, the Jazz won the next two games to take a 2–1 series lead, which included a Game 3 win over the SuperSonics at the Delta Center, 90–80. However, the Jazz lost the next two games, including a Game 5 loss to the SuperSonics at the Seattle Center Coliseum, 100–92, thus losing in a hard-fought five-game series.

=== Aftermath ===
Following the season, Krystkowiak signed as a free agent with the Orlando Magic, and Brown was traded to the Minnesota Timberwolves.

== Draft picks ==
The Jazz did not have any draft picks in 1992.

== Roster ==
1992–93 Utah Jazz roster
Players

Pos.	No.	Player	Height	Weight	DOB	From
C	50	Isaac Austin	6 ft 10 in (2.08 m)	255 lb (116 kg)	1969–08–18	Arizona State
SF	21	David Benoit	6 ft 8 in (2.03 m)	220 lb (100 kg)	1968–05–09	Alabama
C	40	Mike Brown	6 ft 9 in (2.06 m)	257 lb (117 kg)	1963–07–19	George Washington
SF	23	Tyrone Corbin	6 ft 6 in (1.98 m)	210 lb (95 kg)	1962–12–31	DePaul
PG	25	John Crotty	6 ft 1 in (1.85 m)	185 lb (84 kg)	1969–07–15	Virginia
C	54	James Donaldson	7 ft 2 in (2.18 m)	275 lb (125 kg)	1957–08–16	Washington State
C	53	Mark Eaton	7 ft 4 in (2.24 m)	275 lb (125 kg)	1957–01–24	UCLA
SF	43	Stephen Howard	6 ft 9 in (2.06 m)	225 lb (102 kg)	1970–07–15	DePaul
PG	6	Jay Humphries	6 ft 3 in (1.91 m)	185 lb (84 kg)	1962–10–17	Colorado
SF	22	Henry James	6 ft 8 in (2.03 m)	220 lb (100 kg)	1965–07–29	Saint Mary's
SF	42	Larry Krystkowiak	6 ft 9 in (2.06 m)	220 lb (100 kg)	1964–09–23	Montana
SG	24	Jeff Malone	6 ft 4 in (1.93 m)	205 lb (93 kg)	1961–06–28	Mississippi State
PF	32	Karl Malone	6 ft 9 in (2.06 m)	250 lb (113 kg)	1963–07–24	Louisiana Tech
PG	12	John Stockton	6 ft 1 in (1.85 m)	170 lb (77 kg)	1962–03–26	Gonzaga

Coaches
Head coach
- Jerry Sloan
Assistant(s)
- Gordon Chiesa
- David Fredman
- Phil Johnson

Legend
- (DP) Unsigned draft pick
- (FA) Free agent
- (S) Suspended
- Injured

Roster
Updated: April 15, 1993

== Regular season ==
=== Season standings ===
Midwest Division	W	L	PCT	GB	Home	Road	Div
y-Houston Rockets	55	27	.671	—	31–10	24–17	19–7
x-San Antonio Spurs	49	33	.598	6	31–10	18–23	17–9
x-Utah Jazz	47	35	.573	8	28–13	19–22	16–10
Denver Nuggets	36	46	.439	19	28–13	8–33	13–13
Minnesota Timberwolves	19	63	.232	36	11–30	8–33	10–16
Dallas Mavericks	11	71	.134	44	7–34	4–37	3–23

y – clinched division title
x – clinched playoff spot

#	Western Conference				
#	Team	W	L	PCT	GB
1	z-Phoenix Suns	62	20	.756	–
2	y-Houston Rockets	55	27	.671	7
3	x-Seattle SuperSonics	55	27	.671	7
4	x-Portland Trail Blazers	51	31	.622	11
5	x-San Antonio Spurs	49	33	.598	13
6	x-Utah Jazz	47	35	.573	15
7	x-Los Angeles Clippers	41	41	.500	21
8	x-Los Angeles Lakers	39	43	.476	23
9	Denver Nuggets	36	46	.439	26
10	Golden State Warriors	34	48	.415	28
11	Sacramento Kings	25	57	.305	37
12	Minnesota Timberwolves	19	63	.232	43
13	Dallas Mavericks	11	71	.134	51

z – clinched division title
y – clinched division title
x – clinched playoff spot

== Game log ==
=== Regular season ===
1992–93 game log
Total: 47–35 (Home: 28–13; Road: 19–22)
November: 7–5 (home: 1–4; road: 6–1)

Game	Date	Team	Score	High points	High rebounds	High assists	Location Attendance	Record
3	November 12, 1992; 7:00 p.m. MST	Phoenix	L 91–102	K. Malone (32)	Corbin (10)	Stockton (12)	Delta Center; 19,911	1–2
5	November 14, 1992	L.A. Clippers	W 124–104				Delta Center	3–2
6	November 17, 1992	@ New Jersey	W 108–97				Brendan Byrne Arena	4–2
10	November 25, 1992	San Antonio	L 102–128				Delta Center	6–4
11	November 27, 1992	New Jersey	L 110–112				Delta Center	6–5
12	November 28, 1992	@ Houston	W 108–99				The Summit	7–5

December: 11–3 (home: 8–0; road: 3–3)

Game	Date	Team	Score	High points	High rebounds	High assists	Location Attendance	Record
16	December 8, 1992	@ San Antonio	L 103–121				HemisFair Arena	10–6
19	December 16, 1992	@ Charlotte	W 93–91				Charlotte Coliseum	13–6
21	December 19, 1992	@ Cleveland	L 104–121				Richfield Coliseum	14–7

January: 9–6 (home: 7–1; road: 2–5)

Game	Date	Team	Score	High points	High rebounds	High assists	Location Attendance	Record
28	January 5, 1993	San Antonio	W 113–87				Delta Center	20–8
29	January 7, 1993	@ San Antonio	L 99–109				HemisFair Arena	20–9
31	January 10, 1993	@ Houston	L 90–97				The Summit	21–10
33	January 14, 1993	Seattle	W 96–89				Delta Center	23–10
35	January 18, 1993	@ Seattle	L 96–106				Seattle Center Coliseum	24–11
37	January 22, 1993	L.A. Lakers	W 98–94				Delta Center	25–12
39	January 26, 1993	Cleveland	W 113–96				Delta Center	26–13
40	January 27, 1993	@ L.A. Clippers	L 97–107				Los Angeles Memorial Sports Arena	26–14
41	January 30, 1993	L.A. Clippers	W 113–105				Delta Center	27–14

February: 6–8 (home: 2–4; road: 4–4)

Game	Date	Team	Score	High points	High rebounds	High assists	Location Attendance	Record
42	February 1, 1993; 6:00 p.m. MST	Chicago	L 92–96	K. Malone (40)	Eaton (10)	Stockton (13)	Delta Center; 19,911	27–15
44	February 4, 1993	@ L.A. Lakers	L 110–114				Great Western Forum	28–16
47	February 11, 1993	@ Seattle	W 101–96				Seattle Center Coliseum	31–16
50	February 17, 1993; 6:30 p.m. MST	@ Chicago	L 96–114	K. Malone (20)	K. Malone (9)	Stockton (6)	Chicago Stadium; 18,676	32–18
All-Star Break
52	February 23, 1993	Houston	L 78–105				Delta Center	33–19
54	February 26, 1993; 7:30 p.m. MST	@ Phoenix	L 106–113	Stockton (25)	Corbin (16)	Stockton (15)	America West Arena; 19,023	33–21

March: 8–8 (home: 5–3; road: 3–5)

Game	Date	Team	Score	High points	High rebounds	High assists	Location Attendance	Record
56	March 1, 1993	Charlotte	L 107–110				Delta Center	33–23
58	March 4, 1993	@ New York	L 111–125				Madison Square Garden	34–24
61	March 13, 1993	@ Houston	L 95–104				The Summit	35–26
64	March 19, 1993	Seattle	L 97–108				Delta Center	37–27
65	March 20, 1993	@ L.A. Clippers	L 100–107				Los Angeles Memorial Sports Arena	37–28
68	March 25, 1993	New York	W 104–87				Delta Center	39–29
69	March 26, 1993	@ San Antonio	W 104–98				HemisFair Arena	40–29
71	March 31, 1993	San Antonio	W 93–85				Delta Center	41–30

April: 6–5 (home: 5–1; road: 1–4)

Game	Date	Team	Score	High points	High rebounds	High assists	Location Attendance	Record
72	April 4, 1993	@ L.A. Lakers	W 111–99				Great Western Forum	42–30
74	April 8, 1993	Houston	L 90–95				Delta Center	42–32
75	April 11, 1993; 1:30 p.m. MDT	@ Phoenix	L 99–112	K. Malone (22)	K. Malone (10)	Humphries, Stockton (7)	America West Arena; 19,023	42–33
78	April 17, 1993; 7:00 p.m. MDT	Phoenix	W 110–101	K. Malone (28)	Donaldson (9)	Stockton (18)	Delta Center; 19,911	45–33
80	April 21, 1993	L.A. Lakers	W 113–102				Delta Center	46–34

1992–93 schedule

== Playoffs ==
1993 playoff game log
Western Conference First Round: 2–3 (home: 1–1; road: 1–2)

Game	Date	Team	Score	High points	High rebounds	High assists	Location Attendance	Series
1	April 30, 1993	@ Seattle	L 85–99	Karl Malone (24)	Karl Malone (13)	John Stockton (7)	Seattle Center Coliseum; 14,429	0–1
2	May 2, 1993	@ Seattle	W 89–85	Karl Malone (26)	Karl Malone (9)	John Stockton (12)	Seattle Center Coliseum; 14,513	1–1
3	May 4, 1993	Seattle	W 90–80	Karl Malone (23)	Eaton, Corbin (9)	John Stockton (10)	Delta Center; 19,911	2–1
4	May 6, 1993	Seattle	L 80–93	Karl Malone (21)	Karl Malone (12)	John Stockton (15)	Delta Center; 19,911	2–2
5	May 8, 1993	@ Seattle	L 92–100	Karl Malone (26)	Karl Malone (12)	John Stockton (11)	Seattle Center Coliseum; 14,812	2–3

1993 schedule

== Player statistics ==
Legend
GP	Games played	GS	Games started	MPG	Minutes per game
FG%	Field-goal percentage	3P%	3-point field-goal percentage	FT%	Free-throw percentage
RPG	Rebounds per game	APG	Assists per game	SPG	Steals per game
BPG	Blocks per game	PPG	Points per game

=== Season ===
Player	GP	GS	MPG	FG%	3FG%	FT%	RPG	APG	SPG	BPG	PPG
Karl Malone	82	82	37.8	.552	.200	.740	11.2	3.8	1.5	1.0	27.0
Jeff Malone	79	59	32.4	.494	.333	.852	2.2	1.6	0.5	0.1	18.1
John Stockton	82	82	34.9	.486	.385	.798	2.9	12.0	2.4	0.3	15.1
Tyrone Corbin	82	58	31.2	.503	.000	.826	6.3	2.1	1.3	0.4	11.6
Jay Humphries	78	20	26.1	.436	.200	.777	1.8	4.1	1.3	0.1	8.8
David Benoit	82	27	20.9	.436	.347	.750	4.8	0.5	0.5	0.5	8.1
Larry Krystkowiak	71	0	19.2	.466	.000	.796	3.9	1.0	0.6	0.2	7.2
Mike Brown	82	21	18.9	.430	.000	.689	4.8	0.8	0.4	0.3	5.7
James Donaldson	6	1	15.7	.571		.556	4.8	0.2	0.2	1.2	3.5
Henry James	2	0	4.5	.167	.000	.833	0.5	0.0	0.0	0.0	3.5
Mark Eaton	64	57	17.3	.546		.700	4.1	0.3	0.3	1.2	2.8
Isaac Austin	46	3	6.7	.446	.000	.659	1.7	0.1	0.2	0.3	2.8
John Crotty	40	0	6.1	.514	.143	.684	0.4	1.4	0.3	0.0	2.6
Stephen Howard	49	0	5.3	.376		.642	1.2	0.2	0.3	0.2	2.1
Tim Legler	3	0	1.7	.333			0.3	0.0	0.0	0.0	0.7

=== Playoffs ===
Player	GP	GS	MPG	FG%	3FG%	FT%	RPG	APG	SPG	BPG	PPG
Karl Malone	5	5	43.2	.454	.500	.816	10.4	2.0	1.2	0.4	24.0
Jeff Malone	5	5	30.0	.446		.692	3.2	0.6	0.6	0.2	13.4
John Stockton	5	5	38.6	.451	.385	.833	2.4	11.0	2.4	0.0	13.2
Tyrone Corbin	5	0	32.2	.480		.647	7.6	1.8	0.6	0.2	11.8
David Benoit	5	5	27.2	.317	.222	.692	4.8	1.0	0.6	1.2	7.4
Mike Brown	5	0	18.6	.520		.636	3.2	0.4	0.0	0.2	6.6
Jay Humphries	5	0	23.0	.333	.250	.500	2.0	3.4	0.6	0.6	5.2
Mark Eaton	5	5	23.4	.526		.500	6.6	0.4	0.0	1.8	4.4
John Crotty	1	0	3.0	1.000			1.0	1.0	0.0	0.0	4.0
Isaac Austin	1	0	3.0	.500			1.0	0.0	0.0	1.0	2.0
Larry Krystkowiak	1	0	8.0	.000			2.0	0.0	0.0	0.0	0.0
James Donaldson	1	0	5.0	.000			0.0	0.0	0.0	0.0	0.0

Player statistics citation:

== Awards and records ==
- Karl Malone, All-NBA First Team
- John Stockton, All-NBA Second Team

== See also ==
- 1992–93 NBA season
