= 1992–93 Denver Nuggets season =

NBA professional basketball team season

- Head coach: Dan Issel
- President: Bernie Bickerstaff
- General manager: Bernie Bickerstaff
- Arena: McNichols Sports Arena

Results
- Record: 36–46 (.439)
- Place: Division: 4th (Midwest); Conference: 9th (Western)
- Playoff finish: Did not qualify
- Stats at Basketball Reference

Local media
- Television: KWGN-TV; Prime Sports Rocky Mountain
- Radio: KOA

The 1992–93 Denver Nuggets season was the 17th season for the Denver Nuggets in the National Basketball Association, and their 26th season as a franchise.

== Season summary ==
=== Off-season ===
The Nuggets received the fifth overall pick in the 1992 NBA draft, and selected power forward LaPhonso Ellis out of Notre Dame University, and also selected shooting guard Bryant Stith from the University of Virginia with the 13th overall pick. During the off-season, the team acquired second-year guard Robert Pack from the Portland Trail Blazers, and brought back Dan Issel as their new head coach; Issel starred for the Nuggets for ten seasons as a player.

=== Regular season ===
Under Issel and with the addition of Ellis, Stith and Pack, the Nuggets got off to a 7–7 start to the regular season, but then suffered a 14-game losing streak between December and January afterwards, which led to a 7–21 start to the season. At mid-season, the team signed free agent Tom Hammonds, who was previously released by the Charlotte Hornets. Despite the losing streak, the Nuggets played above .500 in winning percentage for the remainder of the season, and held a 20–30 record at the All-Star break. The Nuggets posted a 7–5 record in April, and finished in fourth place in the Midwest Division with a 36–46 record, missing the NBA playoffs by finishing three games behind the 8th–seeded Los Angeles Lakers; the team also posted a very successful 28–13 home record at the McNichols Sports Arena during the regular season.

Chris Jackson became the Nuggets' starting point guard this season, as he averaged 19.2 points and 4.2 assists per game, shot .935 in free throw percentage, and was named the NBA Most Improved Player of the Year. In addition, Reggie Williams averaged 17.0 points, 5.4 rebounds and 1.6 steals per game, while Ellis provided the team with 14.7 points, 9.1 rebounds and 1.4 blocks per game, and was named to the NBA All-Rookie First Team, and second-year star Dikembe Mutombo provided with 13.8 points, 13.0 rebounds and 3.5 blocks per game. Meanwhile, Pack contributed 10.5 points and 4.4 assists per game off the bench, Stith contributed 8.9 points per game, but only played just 39 games due to a broken toe, and right foot injury, Marcus Liberty averaged 8.1 points and 4.3 rebounds per game, and second-year guard Mark Macon provided with 7.5 points and 1.4 steals per game, but only played just 48 games due to injury.

During the NBA All-Star weekend at the Delta Center in Salt Lake City, Utah, Jackson participated in the NBA Slam Dunk Contest. The Nuggets finished 19th in the NBA in home-game attendance, with an attendance of 586,407 at the McNichols Sports Arena during the regular season.

=== Aftermath ===
Following the season, Jackson would change his name to Mahmoud Abdul-Rauf after converting to Islam two years ago, while Todd Lichti and Anthony Cook, who missed the entire regular season due to a knee injury, were both traded to the Orlando Magic, and Scott Hastings retired. This was also the final season in which the Nuggets wore their "rainbow skyline" uniforms until the 2018–19 season.

== NBA draft ==
Round	Pick	Player	Position	Nationality	School/Club team
1	5	LaPhonso Ellis	PF/SF	United States	Notre Dame
1	13	Bryant Stith	SG	United States	Virginia
2	46	Robert Werdann	C	United States	St. John's

== Roster ==
1992–93 Denver Nuggets roster
Players

Pos.	No.	Player	Height	Weight	DOB	From
F	43	Kevin Brooks	6 ft 6 in (1.98 m)	200 lb (91 kg)	1969–10–12	Louisiana
F	45	Anthony Cook (injured) (IN)	6 ft 9 in (2.06 m)	205 lb (93 kg)	1967–03–19	Arizona
F	20	LaPhonso Ellis	6 ft 8 in (2.03 m)	240 lb (109 kg)	1970–05–05	Notre Dame
F	21	Tom Hammonds	6 ft 9 in (2.06 m)	215 lb (98 kg)	1967–03–27	Georgia Tech
C	10	Scott Hastings	6 ft 10 in (2.08 m)	235 lb (107 kg)	1960–06–03	Arkansas
G	3	Chris Jackson	6 ft 1 in (1.85 m)	162 lb (73 kg)	1969–03–09	LSU
F	30	Marcus Liberty	6 ft 8 in (2.03 m)	205 lb (93 kg)	1968–10–27	Illinois
G	21	Todd Lichti	6 ft 4 in (1.93 m)	205 lb (93 kg)	1967–01–08	Stanford
G	1	Mark Macon	6 ft 4 in (1.93 m)	185 lb (84 kg)	1969–04–14	Temple
C	55	Dikembe Mutombo	7 ft 2 in (2.18 m)	245 lb (111 kg)	1966–06–25	Georgetown
G	14	Robert Pack	6 ft 2 in (1.88 m)	180 lb (82 kg)	1969–02–03	USC
F	45	Gary Plummer	6 ft 9 in (2.06 m)	215 lb (98 kg)	1962–02–21	Boston University
G	23	Bryant Stith	6 ft 5 in (1.96 m)	208 lb (94 kg)	1970–12–10	Virginia
C	28	Robert Werdann	6 ft 11 in (2.11 m)	250 lb (113 kg)	1970–09–12	St. John's
G/F	34	Reggie Williams	6 ft 7 in (2.01 m)	190 lb (86 kg)	1964–03–05	Georgetown

Coaches
Head coach
- Dan Issel
Assistant(s)
- Mike Evans
- Gene Littles

Legend
- (DP) Unsigned draft pick
- (FA) Free agent
- (S) Suspended
- Injured

Roster
Updated: February 5, 1993

=== Roster notes ===
- Power forward Anthony Cook was on the injured reserve list due to a knee injury, and missed the entire regular season.

== Regular season ==
=== Season standings ===
Midwest Division	W	L	PCT	GB	Home	Road	Div
y-Houston Rockets	55	27	.671	—	31–10	24–17	19–7
x-San Antonio Spurs	49	33	.598	6	31–10	18–23	17–9
x-Utah Jazz	47	35	.573	8	28–13	19–22	16–10
Denver Nuggets	36	46	.439	19	28–13	8–33	13–13
Minnesota Timberwolves	19	63	.232	36	11–30	8–33	10–16
Dallas Mavericks	11	71	.134	44	7–34	4–37	3–23

y - clinched division title
x - clinched playoff spot

#	Western Conference				
#	Team	W	L	PCT	GB
1	z-Phoenix Suns	62	20	.756	–
2	y-Houston Rockets	55	27	.671	7
3	x-Seattle SuperSonics	55	27	.671	7
4	x-Portland Trail Blazers	51	31	.622	11
5	x-San Antonio Spurs	49	33	.598	13
6	x-Utah Jazz	47	35	.573	15
7	x-Los Angeles Clippers	41	41	.500	21
8	x-Los Angeles Lakers	39	43	.476	23
9	Denver Nuggets	36	46	.439	26
10	Golden State Warriors	34	48	.415	28
11	Sacramento Kings	25	57	.305	37
12	Minnesota Timberwolves	19	63	.232	43
13	Dallas Mavericks	11	71	.134	51

z - clinched division title
y - clinched division title
x - clinched playoff spot

== Player statistics ==
Legend
GP	Games played	GS	Games started	MPG	Minutes per game
FG%	Field-goal percentage	3P%	3-point field-goal percentage	FT%	Free-throw percentage
RPG	Rebounds per game	APG	Assists per game	SPG	Steals per game
BPG	Blocks per game	PPG	Points per game

=== Regular season ===
Player	GP	GS	MPG	FG%	3FG%	FT%	RPG	APG	SPG	BPG	PPG
Mahmoud Abdul-Rauf	81	81	33.5	.450	.355	.935	2.8	4.2	1.0	0.1	19.2
Reggie Williams	79	79	34.5	.458	.270	.804	5.4	3.7	1.6	1.0	17.0
LaPhonso Ellis	82	82	33.5	.504	.154	.748	9.1	1.8	0.9	1.4	14.7
Dikembe Mutombo	82	82	36.9	.510		.681	13.0	1.8	0.5	3.5	13.8
Robert Pack	77	1	20.5	.470	.125	.768	2.1	4.4	1.1	0.1	10.5
Bryant Stith	39	12	22.2	.446	.000	.832	3.2	1.3	0.6	0.1	8.9
Marcus Liberty	78	32	20.3	.406	.373	.654	4.3	1.3	0.8	0.3	8.1
Mark Macon	48	27	23.8	.415	.000	.700	2.1	2.6	1.4	0.1	7.5
Todd Lichti	48	12	15.7	.449	.333	.794	2.1	1.1	0.6	0.2	6.9
Tom Hammonds	35	0	16.3	.489	.000	.611	2.7	0.5	0.5	0.2	5.9
Gary Plummer	60	0	12.3	.465	.000	.726	2.9	0.7	0.2	0.2	4.7
Kevin Brooks	55	2	10.4	.399	.231	.875	1.5	0.6	0.2	0.0	4.1
Scott Hastings	76	0	8.8	.509	.250	.727	1.8	0.4	0.2	0.1	2.1
Robert Werdann	28	0	5.3	.305	.000	.548	1.9	0.3	0.2	0.1	1.9

Player statistics citation:

== Awards, records, and honors ==
- Mahmoud Abdul-Rauf, NBA Most Improved Player Award
- LaPhonso Ellis, NBA All-Rookie Team 1st Team
