= 1992–93 Sacramento Kings season =

NBA professional basketball team season

- Head coach: Garry St. Jean
- Owners: Joseph Benvenuti; Gregg Lukenbill
- Arena: ARCO Arena

Results
- Record: 25–57 (.305)
- Place: Division: 7th (Pacific); Conference: 11th (Western)
- Playoff finish: Did not qualify
- Stats at Basketball Reference

Local media
- Television: KRBK-TV; SportsChannel Pacific
- Radio: KRAK

The 1992–93 Sacramento Kings season was the 44th season for the Sacramento Kings in the National Basketball Association, and their eighth season in Sacramento, California.

== Season summary ==
=== Off-season ===
The Kings received the seventh overall pick in the 1992 NBA draft, and selected small forward Walt Williams from the University of Maryland. During the first month of the regular season, the team signed free agents Rod Higgins and Kurt Rambis, and hired Garry St. Jean as their new head coach during the off-season.

=== Regular season ===
Under St. Jean, and with the addition of Williams and Higgins, the Kings won their first three games of the regular season, but later on posted a seven-game losing streak in December, leading to a 6–16 start to the season. The Kings posted a six-game winning streak between December and January afterwards, but posted a six-game losing streak between January and February, and held a 17–34 record at the All-Star break. The team dealt with injuries, as Mitch Richmond only played just 45 games due to a broken right thumb, and was out for the remainder of the season, and Williams only played 59 games due to a hand injury. The Kings posted another seven-game losing streak in February, posted another six-game losing streak in April, and lost 16 of their final 21 games of the season. The Kings finished in last place in the Pacific Division with a 25–57 record, and missed the NBA playoffs for the seventh consecutive year.

Richmond averaged 21.9 points and 4.9 assists per game, while Lionel Simmons averaged 17.9 points, 7.2 rebounds, 4.5 assists and 1.4 steals per game, and Williams provided the team with 17.0 points and 4.5 rebounds per game, and was named to the NBA All-Rookie Second Team. In addition, Wayman Tisdale averaged 16.6 points and 6.6 rebounds per game, while Spud Webb contributed 14.5 points, 7.0 assists and 1.5 steals per game, and Anthony Bonner provided with 8.6 points and 6.5 rebounds per game. Meanwhile, Higgins contributed 8.3 points per game off the bench, second-year guard Randy Brown provided with 7.6 points and 1.4 steals per game, and Duane Causwell averaged 8.2 points, 5.5 rebounds and 1.6 blocks per game.

During the NBA All-Star weekend at the Delta Center in Salt Lake City, Utah, Richmond was selected for the 1993 NBA All-Star Game, as a member of the Western Conference All-Star team, but did not participate due to injury; it was his first ever All-Star selection. The Kings finished ninth in the NBA in home-game attendance, with an attendance of 709,997 at the ARCO Arena II during the regular season.

=== Aftermath ===
Following the season, Bonner signed as a free agent with the New York Knicks, while Higgins signed with the Cleveland Cavaliers during the next season, and Rambis re-signed with his former team, the Los Angeles Lakers.

== Draft picks ==
Round	Pick	Player	Position	Nationality	College
1	7	Walt Williams	SF	United States	Maryland
2	54	Brett Roberts	SF	United States	Morehead State

== Roster ==
1992–93 Sacramento Kings roster
Players

Pos.	No.	Player	Height	Weight	DOB	From
PF	24	Anthony Bonner	6 ft 8 in (2.03 m)	215 lb (98 kg)	1968–06–08	Saint Louis
PG	3	Randy Brown	6 ft 2 in (1.88 m)	190 lb (86 kg)	1968–05–22	New Mexico State
C	31	Duane Causwell	7 ft 0 in (2.13 m)	240 lb (109 kg)	1968–05–31	Temple
PF	32	Pete Chilcutt	6 ft 10 in (2.08 m)	230 lb (104 kg)	1968–09–14	North Carolina
PF	25	Marty Conlon	6 ft 10 in (2.08 m)	224 lb (102 kg)	1968–01–19	Providence
SF	21	Rod Higgins	6 ft 7 in (2.01 m)	200 lb (91 kg)	1960—01–31	Fresno State
PG	33	Jim Les	5 ft 11 in (1.80 m)	165 lb (75 kg)	1963–08–18	Bradley
PF	30	Kurt Rambis	6 ft 8 in (2.03 m)	213 lb (97 kg)	1958–02–25	Santa Clara
SG	2	Mitch Richmond (injured)	6 ft 5 in (1.96 m)	215 lb (98 kg)	1965–06–30	Kansas State
SF	22	Lionel Simmons	6 ft 7 in (2.01 m)	210 lb (95 kg)	1968–11–14	La Salle
PF	23	Wayman Tisdale	6 ft 9 in (2.06 m)	240 lb (109 kg)	1964–06–09	Oklahoma
PG	4	Spud Webb	5 ft 6 in (1.68 m)	133 lb (60 kg)	1963–07–13	NC State
SF	42	Walt Williams	6 ft 8 in (2.03 m)	219 lb (99 kg)	1970–04–16	Maryland

Coaches
Head coach
- Garry St. Jean
Assistant(s)
- Mike Schuler
- Dave Wohl

Legend
- (DP) Unsigned draft pick
- (FA) Free agent
- (S) Suspended
- Injured

== Regular season ==
=== Season standings ===
Pacific Division	W	L	PCT	GB	Home	Road	Div
y-Phoenix Suns	62	20	.756	—	35–6	27–14	21–9
x-Seattle SuperSonics	55	27	.671	7	33–8	22–19	22–8
x-Portland Trail Blazers	51	31	.622	11	30–11	21–20	19–11
x-Los Angeles Clippers	41	41	.500	21	27–14	14–27	15–15
x-Los Angeles Lakers	39	43	.476	23	20–21	19–22	13–17
Golden State Warriors	34	48	.415	28	19–22	15–26	9–21
Sacramento Kings	25	57	.305	37	16–25	9–32	6–24

#	Western Conference				
#	Team	W	L	PCT	GB
1	z-Phoenix Suns	62	20	.756	–
2	y-Houston Rockets	55	27	.671	7
3	x-Seattle SuperSonics	55	27	.671	7
4	x-Portland Trail Blazers	51	31	.622	11
5	x-San Antonio Spurs	49	33	.598	13
6	x-Utah Jazz	47	35	.573	15
7	x-Los Angeles Clippers	41	41	.500	21
8	x-Los Angeles Lakers	39	43	.476	23
9	Denver Nuggets	36	46	.439	26
10	Golden State Warriors	34	48	.415	28
11	Sacramento Kings	25	57	.305	37
12	Minnesota Timberwolves	19	63	.232	43
13	Dallas Mavericks	11	71	.134	51

z - clinched division title
y - clinched division title
x - clinched playoff spot

== Player statistics ==
Legend
GP	Games played	GS	Games started	MPG	Minutes per game
FG%	Field-goal percentage	3P%	3-point field-goal percentage	FT%	Free-throw percentage
RPG	Rebounds per game	APG	Assists per game	SPG	Steals per game
BPG	Blocks per game	PPG	Points per game

=== Regular season ===
Player	GP	GS	MPG	FG%	3P%	FT%	RPG	APG	SPG	BPG	PPG
Wayman Tisdale	76	75	30.0	.509	.000	.758	6.6	1.4	.7	.6	16.6
Randy Brown	75	34	23.0	.463	.333	.732	2.8	2.6	1.4	.5	7.6
Jim Les	73	0	12.1	.425	.429	.840	1.2	2.3	.5	.1	4.5
Anthony Bonner	70	35	25.2	.461	.000	.593	6.5	1.4	1.2	.2	8.6
Lionel Simmons	69	68	36.3	.444	.091	.819	7.2	4.5	1.4	.6	17.9
Spud Webb	69	68	33.8	.433	.274	.851	2.8	7.0	1.5	.1	14.5
Rod Higgins	69	4	20.7	.412	.323	.861	2.8	1.7	.7	.4	8.3
Kurt Rambis^{†}	67	1	11.7	.516	.000	.667	3.3	.8	.6	.3	2.5
Walt Williams	59	26	28.4	.435	.319	.742	4.5	3.0	1.1	.5	17.0
Pete Chilcutt	59	9	14.1	.485		.696	3.3	1.1	.4	.4	6.1
Duane Causwell	55	45	22.0	.545	.000	.624	5.5	.6	.6	1.6	8.2
Marty Conlon	46	0	10.2	.474	.000	.704	2.7	.8	.3	.1	4.8
Mitch Richmond	45	45	38.4	.474	.369	.845	3.4	4.9	1.2	.2	21.9
Vincent Askew^{†}	9	0	8.4	.471		.733	1.2	.6	.2	.1	3.0
Henry James^{†}	8	0	9.9	.444	.300	.850	1.3	.1	.4	.0	7.5
Stan Kimbrough	3	0	5.0	.333	.500		.0	.3	.3	.0	1.7

- ^{†} Denotes player spent time with another team in the season. Stats reflect time with the Kings only.

Player statistics citation:

== Awards and records ==
- Walt Williams, NBA All-Rookie Team 2nd Team

== See also ==
- 1992-93 NBA season
