= 1992–93 Houston Rockets season =

- Division champions
- Head coach: Rudy Tomjanovich
- General manager: Steve Patterson
- Owner: Charlie Thomas
- Arena: The Summit

Results
- Record: 55–27 (.671)
- Place: Division: 1st (Midwest); Conference: 2nd (Western)
- Playoff finish: Conference semifinals (lost to the Seattle SuperSonics 3–4)
- Stats at Basketball Reference

Local media
- Television: KTXH; Home Sports Entertainment
- Radio: KTRH

The 1992–93 Houston Rockets season was the 26th season for the Houston Rockets in the National Basketball Association, and their 22nd season in Houston, Texas.

== Season summary ==
=== Off-season ===
After missing the NBA playoffs the previous year, the Rockets received the eleventh overall pick in the 1992 NBA draft, and selected power forward Robert Horry from the University of Alabama. During the off-season, the team acquired Scott Brooks from the Minnesota Timberwolves.

=== Regular season ===
Early into the regular season, the Rockets traveled overseas to Yokohama, Japan to play their first two games against the Seattle SuperSonics at the Yokohama Arena. In the first game on November 6, 1992, the Rockets were the home team, and lost to the SuperSonics by a score of 111–94; Hakeem Olajuwon led the team with 21 points, 17 rebounds and 5 blocks, while Kenny Smith finished with 21 points and 9 assists, and Vernon Maxwell also added 21 points. In the second game on November 7, the Rockets were the road team and lost to the SuperSonics by a score of 89–85; Olajuwon finished with 18 points, 16 rebounds, 3 steals and 5 blocks. Both games had an attendance of 14,544 fans at the Yokohama Arena.

With the addition of Horry and Brooks, the Rockets got off to a 14–9 start to the regular season, but then struggled posting a seven-game losing streak between December and January. However, the team posted an eight-game winning streak in January afterwards, and later on held a 30–21 record at the All-Star break. The Rockets went 25–6 for the remainder of the season, posting a 15-game winning streak between February and March, and then posting an 11-game winning streak in April, as the team signed free agent Terry Teagle, who played in the final two games of the regular season. The Rockets finished in first place in the Midwest Division with a 55–27 record, earned the second seed in the Western Conference, and returned to the NBA playoffs after a one-year absence.

Olajuwon averaged 26.1 points, 13.0 rebounds, 3.5 assists, 1.8 steals and 4.2 blocks per game, and was named the NBA Defensive Player of the Year; he was also named to the All-NBA First Team, and to the NBA All-Defensive First Team. In addition, Maxwell averaged 13.8 points and 4.2 assists per game, and led the Rockets with 120 three-point field goals, while Smith contributed 13.0 points and 5.4 assists per game, Otis Thorpe provided the team with 12.8 points and 8.2 rebounds per game, and Horry averaged 10.1 points, 5.0 rebounds and 1.1 blocks per game, and was named to the NBA All-Rookie Second Team. Off the bench, second-year forward Carl Herrera averaged 7.5 points and 5.6 rebounds per game, while three-point specialist Matt Bullard contributed 7.3 points per game, Sleepy Floyd contributed 6.6 points and 2.5 assists per game, and Brooks provided with 6.3 points and 3.0 assists per game.

During the NBA All-Star weekend at the Delta Center in Salt Lake City, Utah, Olajuwon was selected for the 1993 NBA All-Star Game, as a member of the Western Conference All-Star team. Meanwhile, Smith participated in the NBA Slam Dunk Contest for the third time, and also participated in the NBA Three-Point Shootout. Olajuwon also finished in second place in Most Valuable Player voting, behind Charles Barkley of the Phoenix Suns, while head coach Rudy Tomjanovich finished in second place in Coach of the Year voting, behind Pat Riley of the New York Knicks.

The Rockets finished 22nd in the NBA in home-game attendance, with an attendance of 554,210 at The Summit during the regular season.

=== NBA playoffs ===
In the Western Conference First Round of the 1993 NBA playoffs, the Rockets faced off against the 7th–seeded Los Angeles Clippers, a team that featured All-Star forward Danny Manning, Ron Harper and Mark Jackson. The Rockets took a 2–1 series lead before losing Game 4 to the Clippers on the road, 93–90 at the Los Angeles Memorial Sports Arena. With the series tied at 2–2, the Rockets won Game 5 over the Clippers at home, 84–80 at The Summit to win in a hard-fought five-game series.

In the Western Conference Semi-finals, the team faced off against the 3rd–seeded Seattle SuperSonics, who were led by All-Star forward Shawn Kemp, Ricky Pierce and Gary Payton. The Rockets lost the first two games to the SuperSonics on the road at the Seattle Center Coliseum, but managed to win the next two games at The Summit. After losing Game 5 at the Seattle Center Coliseum, 120–95, the Rockets won Game 6 over the SuperSonics at The Summit, 103–90 to even the series. However, the Rockets lost Game 7 to the SuperSonics at the Seattle Center Coliseum in overtime, 103–100, thus losing in a hard-fought seven-game series.

=== Notable highlights ===
A notable note about the Rockets' playoff run that year was the final game of the regular season; the Rockets were playing against the San Antonio Spurs at the HemisFair Arena on April 25, 1993, with the Rockets leading by two points in the final seconds, until Spurs All-Star center David Robinson tip-dunked a missed shot after time expired; it was ruled good, and the Rockets went on to lose in overtime, 119–117, tying their record with Seattle, and losing home-court advantage due to their match-up tie-breaker against the SuperSonics in the second round.

=== Aftermath ===
Following the season, Floyd signed as a free agent with the San Antonio Spurs, and Teagle was released to free agency.

== Draft picks ==
Round	Pick	Player	Position	Nationality	School or club team
1	11	Robert Horry	SF/PF	United States	Alabama
2	41	Popeye Jones	PF	United States	Murray State
2	53	Curtis Blair	PG	United States	Richmond

== Roster ==
1992–93 Houston Rockets roster
Players

Pos.	No.	Player	Height	Weight	DOB	From
G	1	Scott Brooks	5 ft 11 in (1.80 m)	165 lb (75 kg)	1965–07–31	UC Irvine
F	50	Matt Bullard	6 ft 10 in (2.08 m)	215 lb (98 kg)	1967–06–05	Iowa
G	21	Sleepy Floyd	6 ft 3 in (1.91 m)	170 lb (77 kg)	1960–03–06	Georgetown
G	22	Winston Garland	6 ft 2 in (1.88 m)	170 lb (77 kg)	1964–12–19	Missouri State
F	7	Carl Herrera	6 ft 9 in (2.06 m)	215 lb (98 kg)	1966–12–14	Houston
F	25	Robert Horry	6 ft 9 in (2.06 m)	220 lb (100 kg)	1970–08–25	Alabama
G	11	Vernon Maxwell	6 ft 4 in (1.93 m)	180 lb (82 kg)	1965–09–12	Florida
C	34	Hakeem Olajuwon	7 ft 0 in (2.13 m)	255 lb (116 kg)	1963–01–21	Houston
C	15	Tree Rollins	7 ft 1 in (2.16 m)	255 lb (116 kg)	1955–06–16	Clemson
G	30	Kenny Smith	6 ft 3 in (1.91 m)	170 lb (77 kg)	1965–03–08	North Carolina
G	10	Terry Teagle	6 ft 5 in (1.96 m)	195 lb (88 kg)	1960–04–10	Baylor
F	33	Otis Thorpe	6 ft 9 in (2.06 m)	225 lb (102 kg)	1962–08–05	Providence
F	20	Kennard Winchester	6 ft 5 in (1.96 m)	210 lb (95 kg)	1966–09–03	Averett

Coaches
Head coach
- Rudy Tomjanovich
Assistant(s)
- Joe Ash
- Bill Berry
- Jim Boylen
- Carroll Dawson
- John Killilea
- Calvin Murphy

Legend
- (DP) Unsigned draft pick
- (FA) Free agent
- (S) Suspended
- Injured

Roster
Updated: April 22, 1993

== Regular season ==
=== Season standings ===
Midwest Division	W	L	PCT	GB	Home	Road	Div
y-Houston Rockets	55	27	.671	—	31–10	24–17	19–7
x-San Antonio Spurs	49	33	.598	6	31–10	18–23	17–9
x-Utah Jazz	47	35	.573	8	28–13	19–22	16–10
Denver Nuggets	36	46	.439	19	28–13	8–33	13–13
Minnesota Timberwolves	19	63	.232	36	11–30	8–33	10–16
Dallas Mavericks	11	71	.134	44	7–34	4–37	3–23

y – clinched division title
x – clinched playoff spot

#	Western Conference				
#	Team	W	L	PCT	GB
1	z-Phoenix Suns	62	20	.756	–
2	y-Houston Rockets	55	27	.671	7
3	x-Seattle SuperSonics	55	27	.671	7
4	x-Portland Trail Blazers	51	31	.622	11
5	x-San Antonio Spurs	49	33	.598	13
6	x-Utah Jazz	47	35	.573	15
7	x-Los Angeles Clippers	41	41	.500	21
8	x-Los Angeles Lakers	39	43	.476	23
9	Denver Nuggets	36	46	.439	26
10	Golden State Warriors	34	48	.415	28
11	Sacramento Kings	25	57	.305	37
12	Minnesota Timberwolves	19	63	.232	43
13	Dallas Mavericks	11	71	.134	51

z – clinched division title
y – clinched division title
x – clinched playoff spot

== Game log ==
=== Regular season ===
1992–93 game log
Total: 55–27 (home: 31–10; road: 24–17)
November: 7–4 (home: 5–2; road: 2–2)

Game	Date	Team	Score	High points	High rebounds	High assists	Location Attendance	Record
1	November 6, 1992	Seattle (at Yokohama, Japan)	L 94–111				Tokyo Dome	0–1
2	November 7, 1992	@ Seattle (at Yokohama, Japan)	L 85–89				Tokyo Dome	0–2
3	November 11, 1992	Atlanta	W 101–82				The Summit	1–2
4	November 14, 1992	@ San Antonio	W 93–87				HemisFair Arena	2–2
5	November 17, 1992	Sacramento	W 116–109				The Summit	3–2
6	November 19, 1992	Cleveland	W 99–92				The Summit	4–2
7	November 21, 1992	San Antonio	W 103–100				The Summit	5–2
8	November 24, 1992	L.A. Clippers	W 88–83				The Summit	6–2
9	November 25, 1992	@ Orlando	L 94–107				Orlando Arena	6–3
10	November 27, 1992	@ Miami	W 101–93				Miami Arena	7–3
11	November 28, 1992	Utah	L 99–108				The Summit	7–4

December: 7–7 (home: 4–2; road: 3–5)

Game	Date	Team	Score	High points	High rebounds	High assists	Location Attendance	Record
12	December 1, 1992	@ Denver	L 105–112				McNichols Sports Arena	7–5
13	December 3, 1992	L.A. Lakers	L 89–95				The Summit	7–6
14	December 5, 1992	@ Dallas	W 117–96				Reunion Arena	8–6
15	December 8, 1992	Minnesota	W 102–94				The Summit	9–6
16	December 11, 1992; 7:30 p.m. CST	@ Chicago	W 110–96	Olajuwon (28)	Olajuwon (13)	Olajuwon, Smith (7)	Chicago Stadium; 18,147	10–6
17	December 12, 1992	@ Minnesota	W 104–87				Target Center	11–6
18	December 15, 1992	@ Cleveland	L 97–124				Richfield Coliseum	11–7
19	December 17, 1992	San Antonio	W 121–109				The Summit	12–7
20	December 19, 1992	Dallas	W 112–93				The Summit	13–7
21	December 22, 1992	@ Detroit	L 84–98				The Palace of Auburn Hills	13–8
22	December 23, 1992	@ Boston	L 94–98				Boston Garden	13–9
23	December 26, 1992	Denver	W 90–82				The Summit	14–9
24	December 29, 1992	Golden State	L 112–132				The Summit	14–10
25	December 30, 1992; 8:30 p.m. CST	@ Phoenix	L 110–133	Olajuwon (24)	Olajuwon (9)	Olajuwon (5)	America West Arena; 19,023	14–11

January: 10–7 (home: 6–2; road: 4–5)

Game	Date	Team	Score	High points	High rebounds	High assists	Location Attendance	Record
26	January 2, 1993	@ Golden State	L 107–113				Oakland-Alameda County Coliseum Arena	14–12
27	January 3, 1993	@ Portland	L 101–103 (OT)				Memorial Coliseum	14–13
28	January 5, 1993; 7:30 p.m. CST	Phoenix	L 104–106	Olajuwon (29)	Olajuwon (13)	Smith (10)	The Summit; 13,755	14–14
29	January 7, 1993	Portland	L 91–113				The Summit	14–15
30	January 8, 1993	@ Denver	L 90–115				McNichols Sports Arena	14–16
31	January 10, 1993	Utah	W 97–90				The Summit	15–16
32	January 12, 1993	@ L.A. Clippers	W 113–103				Los Angeles Memorial Sports Arena	16–16
33	January 14, 1993	Charlotte	W 114–102				The Summit	17–16
34	January 16, 1993	New York	W 104–102				The Summit	18–16
35	January 18, 1993	@ L.A. Lakers	W 110–90				Great Western Forum	19–16
36	January 19, 1993	@ Sacramento	W 102–96				ARCO Arena	20–16
37	January 21, 1993	Detroit	W 126–120				The Summit	21–16
38	January 23, 1993	@ Indiana	W 113–100				Market Square Arena	22–16
39	January 24, 1993	@ New Jersey	L 83–100				Brendan Byrne Arena	22–17
40	January 26, 1993	@ Milwaukee	L 86–100				Bradley Center	22–18
41	January 28, 1993; 7:30 p.m. CST	Chicago	W 94–83	Maxwell, Olajuwon (18)	Olajuwon (15)	Smith, Thorpe (5)	The Summit; 16,611	23–18
42	January 30, 1993	New Jersey	W 108–105				The Summit	24–18

February: 9–3 (home: 5–2; road: 4–1)

Game	Date	Team	Score	High points	High rebounds	High assists	Location Attendance	Record
43	February 2, 1993	Indiana	W 115–104				The Summit	25–18
44	February 3, 1993	@ Dallas	W 119–102				Reunion Arena	26–18
45	February 5, 1993	Minnesota	L 105–112				The Summit	26–19
46	February 8, 1993	Washington	L 100–106				The Summit	26–20
47	February 10, 1993	@ Philadelphia	W 98–90				The Spectrum	27–20
48	February 11, 1993	@ New York	L 95–125				Madison Square Garden	27–21
49	February 13, 1993	@ Minnesota	W 97–88				Target Center	28–21
50	February 16, 1993	Philadelphia	W 149–111				The Summit	29–21
51	February 18, 1993	Boston	W 119–84				The Summit	30–21
All-Star Break
52	February 23, 1993	@ Utah	W 105–78				Delta Center	31–21
53	February 25, 1993; 7:30 p.m. CST	Phoenix	W 131–104	Olajuwon (32)	Thorpe (15)	Olajuwon, Thorpe (6)	The Summit; 16,611	32–21
54	February 27, 1993	Denver	W 107–102				The Summit	33–21

March: 11–4 (home: 5–1; road: 6–3)

Game	Date	Team	Score	High points	High rebounds	High assists	Location Attendance	Record
55	March 2, 1993	@ L.A. Clippers	W 99–83				Los Angeles Memorial Sports Arena	34–21
56	March 3, 1993	@ Sacramento	W 89–86				ARCO Arena	35–21
57	March 5, 1993	@ Dallas	W 105–86				Reunion Arena	36–21
58	March 6, 1993	Sacramento	W 119–102				The Summit	37–21
59	March 9, 1993	Miami	W 104–94				The Summit	38–21
60	March 11, 1993	Portland	W 104–91				The Summit	39–21
61	March 13, 1993	Utah	W 104–95				The Summit	40–21
62	March 16, 1993	Orlando	W 94–93				The Summit	41–21
63	March 18, 1993	@ Golden State	W 98–85				Oakland-Alameda County Coliseum Arena	42–21
64	March 19, 1993	@ Portland	L 98–106 (OT)				Memorial Coliseum	42–22
65	March 21, 1993	Seattle	L 89–100				The Summit	42–23
66	March 23, 1993	@ Charlotte	W 111–103				Charlotte Coliseum	43–23
67	March 25, 1993	@ Atlanta	L 96–106				The Omni	43–24
68	March 26, 1993	@ Washington	W 90–69				Capital Centre	44–24
69	March 28, 1993	@ Minnesota	L 100–101				Target Center	44–25

April: 11–2 (home: 6–1; road: 5–1)

Game	Date	Team	Score	High points	High rebounds	High assists	Location Attendance	Record
70	April 1, 1993	Milwaukee	W 121–115				The Summit	45–25
71	April 3, 1993	Golden State	W 118–111				The Summit	46–25
72	April 6, 1993	L.A. Clippers	W 114–101				The Summit	47–25
73	April 8, 1993	@ Utah	W 95–90				Delta Center	48–25
74	April 10, 1993	San Antonio	W 98–88				The Summit	49–25
75	April 13, 1993	L.A. Lakers	W 126–107				The Summit	50–25
76	April 14, 1993	@ Denver	W 107–96				McNichols Sports Arena	51–25
77	April 16, 1993	@ L.A. Lakers	W 100–84				Great Western Forum	52–25
78	April 17, 1993	@ Seattle	W 86–81				Seattle Center Coliseum	53–25
79	April 19, 1993; 9:30 p.m. CDT	@ Phoenix	W 111–97	Olajuwon (30)	Olajuwon (14)	Smith (12)	America West Arena; 19,023	54–25
80	April 22, 1993	Minnesota	W 112–110 (OT)				The Summit	55–25
81	April 24, 1993	Dallas	L 123–128				The Summit	55–26
82	April 25, 1993	@ San Antonio	L 117–119 (OT)				HemisFair Arena	55–27

1992–93 schedule

== Playoffs ==
1993 playoff game log
First Round: 3–2 (home: 2–1; road: 1–1)

Game	Date	Team	Score	High points	High rebounds	High assists	Location Attendance	Series
1	April 29, 1993	L.A. Clippers	W 117–94	Hakeem Olajuwon (28)	Hakeem Olajuwon (11)	Winston Garland (9)	The Summit; 16,611	1–0
2	May 1, 1993	L.A. Clippers	L 83–95	Hakeem Olajuwon (30)	Hakeem Olajuwon (14)	three players tied (4)	The Summit; 16,611	1–1
3	May 3, 1993	@ L.A. Clippers	W 111–99	Hakeem Olajuwon (32)	Hakeem Olajuwon (12)	Kenny Smith (7)	Los Angeles Memorial Sports Arena; 12,628	2–1
4	May 5, 1993	@ L.A. Clippers	L 90–93	Hakeem Olajuwon (25)	Hakeem Olajuwon (18)	Hakeem Olajuwon (9)	Los Angeles Memorial Sports Arena; 14,710	2–2
5	May 8, 1993	L.A. Clippers	W 84–80	Hakeem Olajuwon (31)	Hakeem Olajuwon (21)	Kenny Smith (6)	The Summit; 16,611	3–2

Conference semifinals: 3–4 (home: 3–0; road: 0–4)

Game	Date	Team	Score	High points	High rebounds	High assists	Location Attendance	Series
1	May 10, 1993	@ Seattle	L 90–99	Hakeem Olajuwon (26)	Hakeem Olajuwon (16)	Smith, Horry (5)	Seattle Center Coliseum; 14,252	0–1
2	May 12, 1993	@ Seattle	L 100–111	Hakeem Olajuwon (28)	Hakeem Olajuwon (13)	Vernon Maxwell (9)	Seattle Center Coliseum; 14,732	0–2
3	May 15, 1993	Seattle	W 97–79	Otis Thorpe (28)	Otis Thorpe (14)	Kenny Smith (6)	The Summit; 16,611	1–2
4	May 16, 1993	Seattle	W 103–92	Hakeem Olajuwon (24)	Hakeem Olajuwon (12)	Scott Brooks (7)	The Summit; 16,611	2–2
5	May 18, 1993	@ Seattle	L 95–120	Hakeem Olajuwon (25)	Hakeem Olajuwon (14)	Hakeem Olajuwon (5)	Seattle Center Coliseum; 14,433	2–3
6	May 20, 1993	Seattle	W 103–90	Kenny Smith (30)	Olajuwon, Thorpe (10)	Robert Horry (7)	The Summit; 16,611	3–3
7	May 22, 1993	@ Seattle	L 100–103 (OT)	Hakeem Olajuwon (23)	Hakeem Olajuwon (17)	Hakeem Olajuwon (9)	Seattle Center Coliseum; 14,812	3–4

1993 schedule

== Player statistics ==
Legend
GP	Games played	GS	Games started	MPG	Minutes per game
FG%	Field-goal percentage	3P%	3-point field-goal percentage	FT%	Free-throw percentage
RPG	Rebounds per game	APG	Assists per game	SPG	Steals per game
BPG	Blocks per game	PPG	Points per game

=== Season ===
Player	GP	GS	MPG	FG%	3FG%	FT%	RPG	APG	SPG	BPG	PPG
Mark Acres^{†}	6	0	3.8	.222	.500	.500	1.0	.0	.0	.0	1.0
Scott Brooks	82	0	18.5	.475	.414	.830	1.2	3.0	1.0	.0	6.3
Matt Bullard	79	4	17.2	.431	.374	.784	2.8	1.4	.4	.1	7.3
Sleepy Floyd	52	10	16.7	.407	.286	.794	1.7	2.5	.6	.1	6.6
Winston Garland	66	4	15.2	.443	.462	.910	1.6	2.1	.6	.1	5.9
Carl Herrera	81	12	22.2	.541	.000	.710	5.6	.8	.6	.4	7.5
Robert Horry	79	79	29.5	.474	.255	.715	5.0	2.4	1.0	1.1	10.1
Vernon Maxwell	71	68	31.7	.407	.332	.719	3.1	4.2	1.2	.1	13.8
Hakeem Olajuwon	82	82	39.5	.529	.000	.779	13.0	3.5	1.8	4.2	26.1
Tree Rollins	42	0	5.9	.268	.000	.750	1.4	.2	.1	.4	.7
Kenny Smith	82	82	29.5	.520	.438	.878	2.0	5.4	1.0	.1	13.0
Terry Teagle	2	0	12.5	.286		.500	1.5	1.0	.0	.0	2.5
Otis Thorpe	72	69	32.7	.558	.000	.598	8.2	2.5	.6	.3	12.8
Kennard Winchester	39	0	8.7	.439	.211	.773	1.3	.3	.3	.3	3.7

=== Playoffs ===
Player	GP	GS	MPG	FG%	3FG%	FT%	RPG	APG	SPG	BPG	PPG
Scott Brooks	12	0	16.4	.381	.385	.769	.8	2.6	.8	.0	3.9
Matt Bullard	12	0	14.1	.476	.536	1.000	1.9	1.1	.3	.4	5.1
Sleepy Floyd	7	0	8.6	.316	.333	.700	.6	1.1	.3	.0	2.9
Winston Garland	12	5	20.5	.405	.000	1.000	2.8	2.6	1.3	.0	6.4
Carl Herrera	12	0	16.3	.386	.000	.600	3.8	.6	.3	.2	4.7
Robert Horry	12	12	31.2	.465	.300	.741	5.2	3.2	1.5	1.3	10.3
Vernon Maxwell	9	7	34.2	.402	.239	.875	2.4	3.6	1.2	.2	14.0
Hakeem Olajuwon	12	12	43.2	.517	.000	.827	14.0	4.8	1.8	4.9	25.7
Tree Rollins	6	0	2.7	.000	.000		.7	.0	.3	.0	.0
Kenny Smith	12	12	32.6	.492	.500	.778	2.0	4.2	.8	.1	14.8
Terry Teagle	5	0	2.4	.400		.000	.0	.0	.0	.0	.8
Otis Thorpe	12	12	34.9	.635		.651	8.6	2.6	.5	.1	14.5

Player statistics citation:

== Awards and records ==
- Hakeem Olajuwon, NBA Defensive Player of the Year Award
- Hakeem Olajuwon, All-NBA First Team
- Hakeem Olajuwon, NBA All-Defensive First Team
- Robert Horry, NBA All-Rookie Team 2nd Team

== See also ==
- 1992–93 NBA season
