= Sedale Threatt =

American basketball player (born 1961)

Personal information
- Born: September 10, 1961 (age 65) Atlanta, Georgia, U.S.
- Listed height: 6 ft 2 in (1.88 m)
- Listed weight: 185 lb (84 kg)

Career information
- High school: Therrell (Atlanta, Georgia)
- College: West Virginia Tech (1979–1983)
- NBA draft: 1983: 6th round, 139th overall pick
- Drafted by: Philadelphia 76ers
- Playing career: 1983–2002
- Position: Point guard
- Number: 9, 3, 4, 2

Career history
- 1983–1987: Philadelphia 76ers
- 1987–1988: Chicago Bulls
- 1988–1991: Seattle SuperSonics
- 1991–1996: Los Angeles Lakers
- 1996: Paris Basket Racing
- 1997: Houston Rockets
- 1997–1998: Gymnastikos S. Larissas
- 2001–2002: Lausanne Basket

Career highlights
- 3× First-team All-WVIAC (1981–1983)

Career NBA statistics
- Points: 9,327 (9.8 ppg)
- Assists: 3,613 (3.8 apg)
- Steals: 1,138 (1.2 spg)
- Stats at NBA.com
- Stats at Basketball Reference

Sedale Eugene Threatt (/θriːt/ THREET; born September 10, 1961) is an American former professional basketball player in the National Basketball Association (NBA). Born in Atlanta, Georgia, Threatt played college basketball at the West Virginia Institute of Technology from 1979 to 1983. Nicknamed "the Thief" for his ability to steal the basketball, Threatt has the distinction of being the last sixth round pick to play in the NBA (the NBA draft was shortened to the now-current two rounds in 1989). He is also notable as the only player in NBA history who was a teammate of Julius Erving, Michael Jordan and Magic Johnson. He played in the NBA from 1983–1997 and finished his basketball career overseas.

== Professional career ==
Threatt was drafted by the Philadelphia 76ers in the sixth round of the 1983 NBA draft, and is the only player from West Virginia Tech to have ever played in the NBA. During the 1986 NBA playoffs, Threatt played a key role for the 76ers, averaging then career-highs of 13.7 points, 3.5 assists, and 1.9 steals per game. During the Eastern Conference Semifinals against the Bucks, Threatt led all scorers with 28 points during the series deciding game seven, but Philadelphia lost by one point, 113–112. In total, Threatt played for four seasons with the 76ers and was traded to the Chicago Bulls in 1986. In 1988, he was traded to the Seattle SuperSonics for Sam Vincent. He played for Seattle for four seasons before being traded to the Los Angeles Lakers on October 2, 1991, in exchange for three second round draft picks.

Threatt was expected to play a backup role to Magic Johnson. However, after Johnson's sudden retirement for medical reasons (he announced that he was HIV positive), Threatt became the starting point guard. Threatt's ability to steal the ball earned him the nickname "The Thief" from Lakers commentators Chick Hearn and Stu Lantz. Threatt led the Lakers in assists, steals and minutes played each in his first two seasons. In 1992–93, he became the second player in Lakers franchise history (after Johnson) to lead the Lakers in scoring (15.1), assists (6.9), and steals (1.7).

He scored a career high 42 points against the New York Knicks on March 10, 1992, and scored a career playoff high 35 points in Game 1 of the 1993 Western Conference Quarterfinals against the Phoenix Suns. He retired from the NBA after the 1996–97 season and went on to play basketball with the Gymnastikos S. Larissas (Greece) before retiring in 2002.

== Career statistics ==
Legend
GP	Games played	GS	Games started	MPG	Minutes per game
FG%	Field goal percentage	3P%	3-point field goal percentage	FT%	Free throw percentage
RPG	Rebounds per game	APG	Assists per game	SPG	Steals per game
BPG	Blocks per game	PPG	Points per game	**Bold**	Career high
*	Led the league

=== NBA ===
==== Regular season ====
Year	Team	GP	GS	MPG	FG%	3P%	FT%	RPG	APG	SPG	BPG	PPG
1983–84	Philadelphia	45	0	10.3	.419	.125	.821	.9	.9	.3	.0	3.3
1984–85	Philadelphia	**82***	0	15.9	.452	.182	.733	1.2	2.1	1.0	.2	5.4
1985–86	Philadelphia	70	27	25.1	.453	.042	.833	1.7	2.8	1.3	.1	9.9
1986–87	Philadelphia	28	8	23.9	.414	**.438**	.792	2.0	2.9	1.1	.1	9.5
1986–87	Chicago	40	0	19.5	.480	.000	.803	1.3	4.4	1.1	**.2**	7.9
1987–88	Chicago	45	0	15.6	.502	.100	.780	1.2	2.4	.6	.1	6.6
1987–88	Seattle	26	0	13.6	**.519**	.143	.833	1.3	2.0	1.3	**.2**	7.5
1988–89	Seattle	63	0	19.4	.494	.367	.818	1.9	3.8	1.3	.1	8.6
1989–90	Seattle	65	18	22.8	.506	.250	.828	1.8	3.3	1.0	.1	11.4
1990–91	Seattle	80	57	25.8	**.519**	.286	.792	1.2	3.4	1.4	.1	12.7
1991–92	L.A. Lakers	**82**	**82***	**37.4**	.489	.323	.831	3.1	**7.2**	**2.0**	**.2**	**15.1**
1992–93	L.A. Lakers	**82**	**82***	35.3	.508	.264	.823	**3.3**	6.9	1.7	.1	**15.1**
1993–94	L.A. Lakers	81	20	28.1	.482	.152	**.890**	1.9	4.2	1.4	**.2**	11.9
1994–95	L.A. Lakers	59	2	23.5	.497	.379	.793	2.1	4.2	.9	**.2**	9.5
1995–96	L.A. Lakers	82	8	20.6	.458	.355	.761	1.2	3.3	.8	.1	7.3
1996–97	Houston	21	0	15.9	.378	.400	.750	1.1	1.9	.7	.1	3.3
Career		951	304	23.6	.485	.293	.815	1.8	3.8	1.2	.1	9.8

==== Playoffs ====
Year	Team	GP	GS	MPG	FG%	3P%	FT%	RPG	APG	SPG	BPG	PPG
1984	Philadelphia	3	—	2.0	.333	.000	—	.7	.3	.3	.0	.7
1985	Philadelphia	4	0	7.0	.286	—	—	.3	1.3	.3	.0	1.0
1986	Philadelphia	12	0	26.0	.469	.000	.788	2.1	3.5	1.9	.2	13.3
1987	Chicago	3	0	23.3	.471	—	**1.000**	1.7	5.3	.3	.0	6.7
1988	Seattle	5	0	16.0	.412	.000	**1.000**	2.2	2.2	.2	.0	6.4
1989	Seattle	8	1	25.1	.476	.250	.850	1.6	6.1	2.1	.0	12.0
1991	Seattle	5	**5**	27.2	**.536**	.364	.900	1.6	3.4	1.0	.0	14.6
1992	L.A. Lakers	4	4	40.5	.522	**.667**	.750	2.0	4.3	.5	.0	14.8
1993	L.A. Lakers	5	**5**	**41.0**	.438	.231	.750	**3.4**	**8.0**	**2.6**	.2	**18.0**
1995	L.A. Lakers	1	0	11.0	.250	.000	—	.0	2.0	1.0	.0	2.0
1996	L.A. Lakers	4	0	14.3	.222	.182	—	.8	1.0	.5	.0	2.5
1997	Houston	**16**	0	16.6	.393	.300	.750	1.1	3.0	.4	**.3**	3.7
Career		70	15	21.9	.452	.266	.816	1.6	3.6	1.0	.1	8.7

== Personal life ==
Threatt is thought to have fathered at least fourteen children, and been married twice. He married his first wife, Nicole Plotzker, in 1992. She later left him for Dr. Dre; his second marriage was to Britt Johnson.

In 2000, Threatt was sentenced to six months in prison for failing to pay child support. Threatt had a plea deal with prosecutors, who recommended five months of probation, but U.S. District Judge Mark L. Wolf rejected the agreement and sentenced him to prison. Wolf also ordered Threatt to comply with five other outstanding child-support orders for children in other jurisdictions.

As of 2012, Threatt and his son Sedale Threatt Jr. ran a basketball school in Melbourne, Australia. Threatt has another son also named Sedale Threatt Jr., who attended college at Lehigh University and played quarterback on the football team. This Sedale Jr. later went into acting.
