= 1992–93 Minnesota Timberwolves season =

NBA professional basketball team season

- Head coach: Jimmy Rodgers (fired); Sidney Lowe
- Arena: Target Center

Results
- Record: 19–63 (.232)
- Place: Division: 5th (Midwest); Conference: 12th (Western)
- Playoff finish: Did not qualify
- Stats at Basketball Reference

Local media
- Television: KARE/KITN-TV; Prime Sports Upper Midwest
- Radio: KFAN

The 1992–93 Minnesota Timberwolves season was the fourth season for the Minnesota Timberwolves in the National Basketball Association.

== Season summary ==
=== Off-season ===
After finishing the previous season with the league's worst record, the Timberwolves received the third overall pick in the 1992 NBA draft, and selected power forward Christian Laettner out of Duke University. During the off-season, the team acquired Chuck Person and Micheal Williams from the Indiana Pacers, and signed free agent Bob McCann.

=== Regular season ===
With the addition of Laettner, Person and Williams, the Timberwolves got off to a 2–2 start to the regular season, but continued to struggle by losing 28 of their next 33 games. After a 6–23 start to the season, head coach Jimmy Rodgers was fired and replaced with assistant coach, and former Timberwolves guard Sidney Lowe. Under Lowe, the team held a 12–35 record at the All-Star break, and suffered a 12-game losing streak in April, finishing in fifth place in the Midwest Division with a 19–63 record.

Doug West led the Timberwolves in scoring averaging 19.3 points per game, while Laettner averaged 18.2 points, 8.7 rebounds and 1.3 steals per game, and was named to the NBA All-Rookie First Team. In addition, Person provided the team with 16.8 points, 5.6 rebounds and 4.4 assists per game, and also led them with 118 three-point field goals, and Williams contributed 15.1 points, 8.7 assists and 2.2 steals per game. Off the bench, Thurl Bailey contributed 7.5 points per game, while McCann averaged 6.3 points and 3.6 rebounds per game, second-year center Luc Longley averaged 5.8 points, 4.4 rebounds and 1.4 blocks per game, and starting center Felton Spencer provided with 4.1 points and 4.6 rebounds per game.

West also finished tied in ninth place in Most Improved Player voting. The Timberwolves finished seventh in the NBA in home-game attendance, with an attendance of 754,593 at the Target Center during the regular season.

=== Notable highlights ===
In the final game of the regular season against the Utah Jazz on April 25, 1993, Williams set an NBA record of 84 consecutive free throws surpassing Calvin Murphy, whose record was 78 back in 1981. The Timberwolves defeated the Jazz, 113–111 at home to end their 12-game losing streak; Williams shot .907 in free-throw percentage this season.

=== Aftermath ===
Following the season, Spencer was traded to the Jazz, and McCann was released to free agency.

== Draft picks ==
Round	Pick	Player	Position	Nationality	College
1	3	Christian Laettner	C/PF	United States	Duke
2	28	Marlon Maxey	PF	United States	Texas-El Paso
2	34	Chris Smith	SG	United States	Connecticut
2	51	Tim Burroughs	PF	United States	Jacksonville

== Roster ==
1992–93 Minnesota Timberwolves roster
Players

Pos.	No.	Player	Height	Weight	DOB	From
F	41	Thurl Bailey	6 ft 11 in (2.11 m)	215 lb (98 kg)	––	NC State
G	21	Lance Blanks	6 ft 4 in (1.93 m)	190 lb (86 kg)	––	Texas
F/C	32	Christian Laettner	6 ft 11 in (2.11 m)	235 lb (107 kg)	––	Duke
C	13	Luc Longley (injured)	7 ft 2 in (2.18 m)	265 lb (120 kg)	––	New Mexico
F	25	Marlon Maxey	6 ft 8 in (2.03 m)	250 lb (113 kg)	––	UTEP
F	30	Bob McCann	6 ft 6 in (1.98 m)	244 lb (111 kg)	––	Morehead State
F	45	Chuck Person	6 ft 8 in (2.03 m)	220 lb (100 kg)	––	Auburn
C	4	Brad Sellers	7 ft 0 in (2.13 m)	210 lb (95 kg)	––	Ohio State
G	3	Chris Smith	6 ft 3 in (1.91 m)	190 lb (86 kg)	––	Connecticut
C	50	Felton Spencer	7 ft 0 in (2.13 m)	265 lb (120 kg)	––	Louisville
F	2	Gundars Vētra	6 ft 6 in (1.98 m)	195 lb (88 kg)	––
G	5	Doug West	6 ft 6 in (1.98 m)	200 lb (91 kg)	––	Villanova
G	24	Micheal Williams	6 ft 2 in (1.88 m)	175 lb (79 kg)	––	Baylor

Coaches
Head coach
- Sidney Lowe
Assistant(s)
- Jim Brewer
- Chuck Davisson

Legend
- (DP) Unsigned draft pick
- (FA) Free agent
- (S) Suspended
- Injured

== Regular season ==
=== Season standings ===
Midwest Division	W	L	PCT	GB	Home	Road	Div
y-Houston Rockets	55	27	.671	—	31–10	24–17	19–7
x-San Antonio Spurs	49	33	.598	6	31–10	18–23	17–9
x-Utah Jazz	47	35	.573	8	28–13	19–22	16–10
Denver Nuggets	36	46	.439	19	28–13	8–33	13–13
Minnesota Timberwolves	19	63	.232	36	11–30	8–33	10–16
Dallas Mavericks	11	71	.134	44	7–34	4–37	3–23

y - clinched division title
x - clinched playoff spot

#	Western Conference				
#	Team	W	L	PCT	GB
1	z-Phoenix Suns	62	20	.756	–
2	y-Houston Rockets	55	27	.671	7
3	x-Seattle SuperSonics	55	27	.671	7
4	x-Portland Trail Blazers	51	31	.622	11
5	x-San Antonio Spurs	49	33	.598	13
6	x-Utah Jazz	47	35	.573	15
7	x-Los Angeles Clippers	41	41	.500	21
8	x-Los Angeles Lakers	39	43	.476	23
9	Denver Nuggets	36	46	.439	26
10	Golden State Warriors	34	48	.415	28
11	Sacramento Kings	25	57	.305	37
12	Minnesota Timberwolves	19	63	.232	43
13	Dallas Mavericks	11	71	.134	51

z - clinched division title
y - clinched division title
x - clinched playoff spot

== Player statistics ==
=== Ragular season ===
Player	POS	GP	GS	MP	REB	AST	STL	BLK	PTS	MPG	RPG	APG	SPG	BPG	PPG
Christian Laettner	PF	81	81	2,823	708	223	105	83	1,472	34.9	8.7	2.8	1.3	1.0	18.2
Doug West	SG	80	80	3,104	247	235	85	21	1,543	38.8	3.1	2.9	1.1	.3	19.3
Chris Smith	SG	80	6	1,266	96	196	48	16	347	15.8	1.2	2.5	.6	.2	4.3
Bob McCann	SF	79	7	1,536	282	68	51	58	495	19.4	3.6	.9	.6	.7	6.3
Chuck Person	SF	78	75	2,985	433	343	67	30	1,309	38.3	5.6	4.4	.9	.4	16.8
Micheal Williams	PG	76	76	2,661	273	661	165	23	1,151	35.0	3.6	8.7	2.2	.3	15.1
Felton Spencer	C	71	48	1,296	324	17	23	66	293	18.3	4.6	.2	.3	.9	4.1
Thurl Bailey	PF	70	3	1,276	215	61	20	47	525	18.2	3.1	.9	.3	.7	7.5
Lance Blanks	SG	61	2	642	68	72	16	5	161	10.5	1.1	1.2	.3	.1	2.6
Luc Longley	C	55	25	1,045	240	51	47	77	319	19.0	4.4	.9	.9	1.4	5.8
Brad Sellers	PF	54	4	533	83	46	6	11	135	9.9	1.5	.9	.1	.2	2.5
Marlon Maxey	PF	43	3	520	164	12	11	18	231	12.1	3.8	.3	.3	.4	5.4
Gundars Vētra	SF	13	0	89	8	6	2	0	45	6.8	.6	.5	.2	.0	3.5
Gerald Glass^{†}	SF	4	0	71	3	9	3	0	20	17.8	.8	2.3	.8	.0	5.0
Mark Randall^{†}	PF	2	0	8	0	1	0	0	0	4.0	.0	.5	.0	.0	.0

- ^{†} Denotes player spent time with another team in the season. Stats reflect time with the Timberwolves only.

== Awards and records ==
- Christian Laettner, NBA All-Rookie Team 1st Team

== See also ==
- 1992-93 NBA season
