= 1992–93 Golden State Warriors season =

NBA professional basketball team season

- Head coach: Don Nelson
- Arena: Oakland-Alameda County Coliseum Arena

Results
- Record: 34–48 (.415)
- Place: Division: 6th (Pacific); Conference: 10th (Western)
- Playoff finish: Did not qualify
- Stats at Basketball Reference

Local media
- Television: KPIX-TV; KICU-TV; SportsChannel Pacific (Steve Albert, Jim Barnett)
- Radio: KNBR (Greg Papa)

The 1992–93 Golden State Warriors season was the 47th season for the Golden State Warriors in the National Basketball Association, and their 30th season in the San Francisco Bay Area.

== Season summary ==
=== Off-season ===
The season was perhaps most memorable for the Warriors drafting shooting guard Latrell Sprewell from the University of Alabama with the 24th overall pick in the 1992 NBA draft. During the off-season, the team signed free agent Jeff Grayer, and acquired rookie small forward Byron Houston from the Chicago Bulls.

=== Regular season ===
The Warriors lost several of their important players to injury during the regular season; Chris Mullin missed half the season due to a torn ligament in his right thumb, only playing in just 46 games, and Tim Hardaway missed 16 games due to a bruised right knee. Meanwhile, sixth man Šarūnas Marčiulionis broke his right leg and dislocated his right ankle in a jogging accident before the season began, returned to play 30 games, then sat out the remainder of the season with Achilles tendonitis, and second-year star Billy Owens only played just 37 games due to a knee injury.

Because of the injuries, along with the addition of Sprewell, the Warriors got off to a slow 6–11 start to the regular season. The team soon recovered posting two five-game winning streaks between December and January, which led to an 18–14 start to the season. However, the Warriors struggled losing 15 of their next 17 games, including an eight-game losing streak between January and February, and held a 23–30 record at the All-Star break. After releasing oft-injured center Alton Lister to free agency in March, the Warriors lost six of their final eight games of the season, and finished in sixth place in the Pacific Division with a 34–48 record, failing to qualify for the NBA playoffs.

Mullin averaged 25.9 points, 5.0 rebounds, 3.6 assists and 1.5 steals per game, while Hardaway averaged 21.6 points, 10.6 assists and 1.8 steals per game, led the Warriors with 102 three-point field goals, and was named to the All-NBA Third Team, and Sprewell provided the team with 15.4 points, 3.8 assists and 1.6 steals per game, and was named to the NBA All-Rookie Second Team. In addition, Owens provided with 16.5 points, 7.1 rebounds and 3.9 assists per game, while Marčiulionis contributed 17.4 points, 3.5 assists and 1.7 steals per game, and second-year center Victor Alexander averaged 11.2 points and 5.8 rebounds per game. Meanwhile, second-year forward Chris Gatling averaged 9.3 points and 4.6 rebounds per game off the bench, Grayer contributed 8.8 points per game in 48 games, Tyrone Hill provided with 8.6 points and 10.2 rebounds per game, Jud Buechler contributed 6.2 points per game, and Houston averaged 5.3 points and 4.0 rebounds per game.

During the NBA All-Star weekend at the Delta Center in Salt Lake City, Utah, Mullin and Hardaway were both selected for the 1993 NBA All-Star Game, as members of the Western Conference All-Star team, but Mullin did not participate due to injury; it was Mullin's fifth and final All-Star selection. The Warriors finished 16th in the NBA in home-game attendance, with an attendance of 616,025 at the Oakland-Alameda County Coliseum Arena during the regular season.

=== Aftermath ===
Following the season, Hill was traded to the Cleveland Cavaliers.

== Offseason ==
=== Draft picks ===
| Round | Pick | Player | Position | Nationality | College |
|---|---|---|---|---|---|
| 1 | 24 | Latrell Sprewell | SG/SF | United States | Alabama |
| 2 | 43 | Predrag Danilović | SG/SF | FR Yugoslavia | |
| 2 | 50 | Matt Fish | C | United States | North Carolina-Wilmington |

== Roster ==
1992–93 Golden State Warriors roster
Players

| Pos. | No. | Player | Height | Weight | DOB | From |
|---|---|---|---|---|---|---|
| C | 52 | Victor Alexander | 6 ft 9 in (2.06 m) | 265 lb (120 kg) | 1969–08–31 | Iowa State |
| F | 35 | Jud Buechler | 6 ft 6 in (1.98 m) | 220 lb (100 kg) | 1968–06–19 | Arizona |
| F | 45 | Joe Courtney | 6 ft 8 in (2.03 m) | 235 lb (107 kg) | 1969–10–17 | Southern Miss |
| F | 25 | Chris Gatling | 6 ft 10 in (2.08 m) | 220 lb (100 kg) | 1967–09–03 | Old Dominion |
| G | 44 | Jeff Grayer | 6 ft 5 in (1.96 m) | 200 lb (91 kg) | 1965–12–17 | Iowa State |
| G | 10 | Tim Hardaway | 6 ft 0 in (1.83 m) | 175 lb (79 kg) | 1966–09–01 | UTEP |
| F | 3 | Sean Higgins | 6 ft 9 in (2.06 m) | 205 lb (93 kg) | 1968–12–30 | Michigan |
| C | 32 | Tyrone Hill | 6 ft 9 in (2.06 m) | 240 lb (109 kg) | 1968–03–19 | Xavier |
| F | 21 | Byron Houston | 6 ft 5 in (1.96 m) | 250 lb (113 kg) | 1969–11–22 | Oklahoma State |
| G | 2 | Keith Jennings | 5 ft 7 in (1.70 m) | 160 lb (73 kg) | 1968–11–02 | East Tennessee State |
| G | 13 | Šarūnas Marčiulionis | 6 ft 5 in (1.96 m) | 200 lb (91 kg) | 1964–06–13 | Lithuania |
| F | 17 | Chris Mullin | 6 ft 6 in (1.98 m) | 200 lb (91 kg) | 1963–07–30 | St. John's |
| F | 30 | Billy Owens | 6 ft 8 in (2.03 m) | 220 lb (100 kg) | 1969–05–01 | Syracuse |
| F | 12 | Andre Spencer | 6 ft 6 in (1.98 m) | 210 lb (95 kg) | 1964–07–20 | Northern Arizona |
| G | 15 | Latrell Sprewell | 6 ft 5 in (1.96 m) | 190 lb (86 kg) | 1970–09–08 | Alabama |

Coaches
Head coach
- Don Nelson
Assistant(s)
- Gregg Popovich
- Paul Pressey
- Donnie Nelson

Legend
- (DP) Unsigned draft pick
- (FA) Free agent
- (S) Suspended
- Injured

Roster
Updated: April 14, 1993

== Regular season ==
=== Season standings ===
| Pacific Division | W | L | PCT | GB | Home | Road | Div |
|---|---|---|---|---|---|---|---|
| y-Phoenix Suns | 62 | 20 | .756 | — | 35–6 | 27–14 | 21–9 |
| x-Seattle SuperSonics | 55 | 27 | .671 | 7 | 33–8 | 22–19 | 22–8 |
| x-Portland Trail Blazers | 51 | 31 | .622 | 11 | 30–11 | 21–20 | 19–11 |
| x-Los Angeles Clippers | 41 | 41 | .500 | 21 | 27–14 | 14–27 | 15–15 |
| x-Los Angeles Lakers | 39 | 43 | .476 | 23 | 20–21 | 19–22 | 13–17 |
| Golden State Warriors | 34 | 48 | .415 | 28 | 19–22 | 15–26 | 9–21 |
| Sacramento Kings | 25 | 57 | .305 | 37 | 16–25 | 9–32 | 6–24 |

| # | Western Conference | | | | |
| # | Team | W | L | PCT | GB |
|---|---|---|---|---|---|
| 1 | z-Phoenix Suns | 62 | 20 | .756 | – |
| 2 | y-Houston Rockets | 55 | 27 | .671 | 7 |
| 3 | x-Seattle SuperSonics | 55 | 27 | .671 | 7 |
| 4 | x-Portland Trail Blazers | 51 | 31 | .622 | 11 |
| 5 | x-San Antonio Spurs | 49 | 33 | .598 | 13 |
| 6 | x-Utah Jazz | 47 | 35 | .573 | 15 |
| 7 | x-Los Angeles Clippers | 41 | 41 | .500 | 21 |
| 8 | x-Los Angeles Lakers | 39 | 43 | .476 | 23 |
| 9 | Denver Nuggets | 36 | 46 | .439 | 26 |
| 10 | Golden State Warriors | 34 | 48 | .415 | 28 |
| 11 | Sacramento Kings | 25 | 57 | .305 | 37 |
| 12 | Minnesota Timberwolves | 19 | 63 | .232 | 43 |
| 13 | Dallas Mavericks | 11 | 71 | .134 | 51 |

z - clinched division title
y - clinched division title
x - clinched playoff spot

== Player statistics ==
Legend
| GP | Games played | GS | Games started | MPG | Minutes per game |
| FG% | Field-goal percentage | 3P% | 3-point field-goal percentage | FT% | Free-throw percentage |
| RPG | Rebounds per game | APG | Assists per game | SPG | Steals per game |
| BPG | Blocks per game | PPG | Points per game |

=== Regular season ===
| Player | GP | GS | MPG | FG% | 3P% | FT% | RPG | APG | SPG | BPG | PPG |
|---|---|---|---|---|---|---|---|---|---|---|---|
| Byron Houston | 79 | 8 | 16.1 | .446 | .286 | .665 | 4.0 | .9 | .6 | .5 | 5.3 |
| Latrell Sprewell | 77 | 69 | 35.6 | .464 | .369 | .746 | 3.5 | 3.8 | 1.6 | .7 | 15.4 |
| Tyrone Hill | 74 | 66 | 28.0 | .508 | .000 | .624 | 10.2 | .9 | .6 | .5 | 8.6 |
| Victor Alexander | 72 | 59 | 24.3 | .516 | .455 | .685 | 5.8 | 1.3 | .5 | .7 | 11.2 |
| Chris Gatling | 70 | 11 | 17.8 | .539 | .000 | .725 | 4.6 | .6 | .6 | .8 | 9.3 |
| Jud Buechler | 70 | 9 | 18.4 | .437 | .339 | .747 | 2.8 | 1.3 | .7 | .3 | 6.2 |
| Tim Hardaway | 66 | 66 | 39.5 | .447 | .330 | .744 | 4.0 | 10.6 | 1.8 | .2 | 21.5 |
| Jeff Grayer | 48 | 12 | 21.4 | .467 | .143 | .669 | 3.3 | 1.5 | .6 | .2 | 8.8 |
| Chris Mullin | 46 | 46 | 41.3 | .510 | .451 | .810 | 5.0 | 3.6 | 1.5 | .9 | 25.9 |
| Billy Owens | 37 | 37 | 32.5 | .501 | .091 | .639 | 7.1 | 3.9 | .9 | .8 | 16.5 |
| Šarūnas Marčiulionis | 30 | 8 | 27.9 | .543 | .200 | .761 | 3.2 | 3.5 | 1.7 | .1 | 17.4 |
| Ed Nealy^{†} | 30 | 4 | 7.6 | .348 | .318 | .700 | 1.6 | .4 | .3 | .0 | 1.5 |
| Sean Higgins | 29 | 4 | 20.4 | .447 | .351 | .745 | 2.3 | 2.3 | .4 | .2 | 8.3 |
| Alton Lister | 20 | 9 | 8.7 | .452 | | .538 | 2.2 | .3 | .0 | .5 | 2.3 |
| Paul Pressey | 18 | 0 | 14.9 | .439 | .000 | .778 | 1.7 | 1.7 | .6 | .3 | 4.4 |
| Andre Spencer^{†} | 17 | 1 | 23.9 | .456 | .000 | .759 | 4.7 | 1.4 | .9 | .4 | 11.0 |
| Keith Jennings | 8 | 0 | 17.0 | .595 | .556 | .778 | 1.4 | 2.9 | .5 | .0 | 8.6 |
| Joe Courtney^{†} | 7 | 0 | 10.0 | .391 | | .800 | 2.4 | .3 | .4 | .6 | 3.1 |
| Pat Durham | 5 | 1 | 15.6 | .240 | | .750 | 2.8 | .8 | .2 | .2 | 4.2 |
| Barry Stevens | 2 | 0 | 3.0 | .500 | | | 1.0 | .0 | .0 | .0 | 1.0 |

- ^{†} Denotes player spent time with another team in the season. Stats reflect time with the Warriors only.

Player statistics citation:

== Awards and records ==
- Chris Mullin, NBA All-Star Game
- Tim Hardaway, NBA All-Star Game
- Tim Hardaway, All-NBA Third Team
- Latrell Sprewell, NBA All-Rookie Team Second Team
