= 1992–93 Portland Trail Blazers season =

NBA professional basketball team season

- Head coach: Rick Adelman
- Arena: Memorial Coliseum

Results
- Record: 51–31 (.622)
- Place: Division: 3rd (Pacific); Conference: 4th (Western)
- Playoff finish: First round (lost to Spurs 1–3)
- Stats at Basketball Reference

Local media
- Television: KGW; Prime Sports Northwest
- Radio: KEX

The 1992–93 Portland Trail Blazers season was the 23rd season for the Portland Trail Blazers in the National Basketball Association. The Trail Blazers entered the regular season as runners-up in the 1992 NBA Finals, where they lost to the Chicago Bulls in six games.

== Season summary ==
=== Off-season ===
During the off-season, the team signed free agents Rod Strickland, and Mario Elie.

=== Regular season ===
With the addition of Strickland and Elie, the Trail Blazers got off to a fast start by winning their first eight games of the regular season. The team posted a six-game winning streak in January, which led to a 28–11 start to the season, and later on held a 31–16 record at the All-Star break. However, Clyde Drexler only played just 49 games due to knee and hamstring injuries. The Trail Blazers finished in third place in the Pacific Division with a 51–31 record, and earned the fourth seed in the Western Conference; the team qualified for the NBA playoffs for the eleventh consecutive year.

Drexler averaged 19.9 points, 6.3 rebounds, 5.7 assists and 1.9 steals per game, while Clifford Robinson averaged 19.1 points and 6.6 rebounds per game off the bench, and was named the NBA Sixth Man of the Year, and Terry Porter provided the team with 18.2 points and 5.2 assists per game, and also led them with 143 three-point field goals. In addition, Strickland provided with 13.7 points, 7.2 assists and 1.7 steals per game, while Jerome Kersey contributed 10.6 points and 6.2 rebounds per game, Kevin Duckworth provided with 9.9 points and 5.2 rebounds per game, and Buck Williams averaged 8.3 points and 8.4 rebounds per game. Off the bench, Elie contributed 8.6 points per game, and Mark Bryant provided with 6.0 points and 4.1 rebounds per game.

During the NBA All-Star weekend at the Delta Center in Salt Lake City, Utah, Drexler and Porter were both selected for the 1993 NBA All-Star Game, as members of the Western Conference All-Star team; it was Porter's second and final All-Star appearance. In addition, Porter also participated in the NBA Three-Point Shootout for the second time. Drexler also finished tied in tenth place in Most Valuable Player voting, while Robinson finished in fifth place in Most Improved Player voting.

The Trail Blazers finished 25th in the NBA in home-game attendance, with an attendance of 528,408 at the Memorial Coliseum during the regular season, which was the third-lowest in the league.

=== NBA playoffs ===
In the Western Conference First Round of the 1993 NBA playoffs, the Trail Blazers faced off against the 5th–seeded San Antonio Spurs, who were led by the trio of All-Star center David Robinson, All-Star forward Sean Elliott, and Dale Ellis. However, the Trail Blazers were unable to follow the previous season's playoff run to the NBA Finals; with the series tied at 1–1, the team lost the next two games to the Spurs on the road, which included a Game 4 loss at the HemisFair Arena in overtime, 100–97, thus losing the series in four games.

=== Notable incidents ===
This season was not without controversy, as in February 1993, four members of the team: Kersey and Trail Blazer rookies, Tracy Murray, Dave Johnson and Reggie Smith, were all accused of sexual misconduct by two 16-year old teenage girls from Salt Lake City, who claimed they had sex with the players on January 23. The Trail Blazers were on the road to play against the Utah Jazz at the Delta Center at the time. Murray and Johnson were both fined $20,000 and suspended for three games, while Kersey and Smith were both fined $15,000.

=== Aftermath ===
Following the season, Duckworth was traded to the Washington Bullets after his production had decreased in the previous two seasons, and Elie was traded to the Houston Rockets.

== NBA draft ==
Round	Pick	Player	Position	Nationality	School/Club team
1	26	Dave Johnson	SF/SG	United States	Syracuse
2	31	Reggie Smith	C/PF	United States	TCU

== Roster ==
1992–93 Portland Trail Blazers roster
Players

Pos.	No.	Player	Height	Weight	DOB	From
C	2	Mark Bryant	6 ft 9 in (2.06 m)	245 lb (111 kg)	1965–04–25	Seton Hall
G	22	Clyde Drexler	6 ft 7 in (2.01 m)	210 lb (95 kg)	1962–06–22	Houston
C	00	Kevin Duckworth	7 ft 0 in (2.13 m)	275 lb (125 kg)	1964–04–01	Eastern Illinois
F	17	Mario Elie	6 ft 5 in (1.96 m)	210 lb (95 kg)	1963–11–26	American International
G	4	Dave Johnson	6 ft 7 in (2.01 m)	210 lb (95 kg)	1970–11–16	Syracuse
F	25	Jerome Kersey	6 ft 7 in (2.01 m)	215 lb (98 kg)	1962–06–26	Longwood
F	31	Tracy Murray	6 ft 7 in (2.01 m)	225 lb (102 kg)	1971–07–25	UCLA
G	30	Terry Porter	6 ft 3 in (1.91 m)	195 lb (88 kg)	1963–04–08	UW–Stevens Point
F	3	Clifford Robinson	6 ft 10 in (2.08 m)	225 lb (102 kg)	1966–12–16	Connecticut
G	11	Delaney Rudd	6 ft 2 in (1.88 m)	180 lb (82 kg)	1962–11–08	Wake Forest
F	54	Reggie Smith	6 ft 10 in (2.08 m)	240 lb (109 kg)	1970–08–21	TCU
G	1	Rod Strickland	6 ft 3 in (1.91 m)	175 lb (79 kg)	1966–07–11	DePaul
F	52	Buck Williams	6 ft 8 in (2.03 m)	215 lb (98 kg)	1960–03–08	Maryland
C	6	Joe Wolf	6 ft 11 in (2.11 m)	230 lb (104 kg)	1964–12–17	North Carolina

Coaches
Head coach
- Rick Adelman
Assistant(s)
- Kip Motta
- Jack Schalow
- John Wetzel

Legend
- (DP) Unsigned draft pick
- (FA) Free agent
- (S) Suspended
- Injured

Roster

== Regular season ==
=== Season standings ===
Pacific Division	W	L	PCT	GB	Home	Road	Div
y-Phoenix Suns	62	20	.756	—	35–6	27–14	21–9
x-Seattle SuperSonics	55	27	.671	7	33–8	22–19	22–8
x-Portland Trail Blazers	51	31	.622	11	30–11	21–20	19–11
x-Los Angeles Clippers	41	41	.500	21	27–14	14–27	15–15
x-Los Angeles Lakers	39	43	.476	23	20–21	19–22	13–17
Golden State Warriors	34	48	.415	28	19–22	15–26	9–21
Sacramento Kings	25	57	.305	37	16–25	9–32	6–24

#	Western Conference				
#	Team	W	L	PCT	GB
1	z-Phoenix Suns	62	20	.756	–
2	y-Houston Rockets	55	27	.671	7
3	x-Seattle SuperSonics	55	27	.671	7
4	x-Portland Trail Blazers	51	31	.622	11
5	x-San Antonio Spurs	49	33	.598	13
6	x-Utah Jazz	47	35	.573	15
7	x-Los Angeles Clippers	41	41	.500	21
8	x-Los Angeles Lakers	39	43	.476	23
9	Denver Nuggets	36	46	.439	26
10	Golden State Warriors	34	48	.415	28
11	Sacramento Kings	25	57	.305	37
12	Minnesota Timberwolves	19	63	.232	43
13	Dallas Mavericks	11	71	.134	51

z - clinched division title
y - clinched division title
x - clinched playoff spot

== Playoffs ==
1993 playoff game log
First round: 1–3 (home: 1–1; road: 0–2)

Game	Date	Team	Score	High points	High rebounds	High assists	Location Attendance	Series
1	April 29	San Antonio	L 86–87	Jerome Kersey (24)	Jerome Kersey (9)	Rod Strickland (9)	Memorial Coliseum; 12,888	0–1
2	May 1	San Antonio	W 105–96	Clyde Drexler (21)	Rod Strickland (8)	Rod Strickland (9)	Memorial Coliseum; 12,888	1–1
3	May 5	@ San Antonio	L 101–107	Clyde Drexler (19)	Buck Williams (7)	Rod Strickland (9)	HemisFair Arena; 16,057	1–2
4	May 7	@ San Antonio	L 97–100 (OT)	Mark Bryant (21)	Jerome Kersey (14)	Rod Strickland (10)	HemisFair Arena; 16,057	1–3

1993 schedule

== Player statistics ==
Legend
GP	Games played	GS	Games started	MPG	Minutes per game
FG%	Field-goal percentage	3P%	3-point field-goal percentage	FT%	Free-throw percentage
RPG	Rebounds per game	APG	Assists per game	SPG	Steals per game
BPG	Blocks per game	PPG	Points per game

=== Regular season ===
Player	GP	GS	MPG	FG%	3P%	FT%	RPG	APG	SPG	BPG	PPG
Buck Williams	82	82	30.5	.511	.000	.645	8.4	.9	1.0	.7	8.3
Clifford Robinson	82	12	31.4	.473	.247	.690	6.6	2.2	1.2	2.0	19.1
Mario Elie	82	7	21.4	.458	.349	.855	2.6	2.2	.9	.2	8.6
Terry Porter	81	81	35.6	.454	.414	.843	3.9	5.2	1.2	.1	18.2
Mark Bryant	80	24	17.5	.503	.000	.703	4.1	.5	.5	.3	6.0
Rod Strickland	78	35	31.7	.485	.133	.717	4.3	7.2	1.7	.3	13.7
Kevin Duckworth	74	55	23.8	.438	.000	.730	5.2	.9	.6	.5	9.9
Jerome Kersey	65	50	26.4	.438	.286	.634	6.2	1.9	1.2	.6	10.6
Clyde Drexler	49	49	34.1	.429	.233	.839	6.3	5.7	1.9	.8	19.9
Tracy Murray	48	14	10.3	.415	.300	.875	1.7	.2	.2	.1	5.7
Dave Johnson	42	0	8.5	.383	.214	.678	1.1	.3	.2	.0	3.7
Reggie Smith	23	0	3.0	.370	.000	.214	.9	.0	.2	.0	1.0
Joe Wolf^{†}	21	0	7.4	.465	.000	.857	2.1	.2	.3	.0	2.5
Delaney Rudd	15	1	6.3	.194	.091	.786	.6	1.1	.1	.0	1.7

=== Playoffs ===
Player	GP	GS	MPG	FG%	3P%	FT%	RPG	APG	SPG	BPG	PPG
Terry Porter	21	21	41.4	.516	.474	.832	4.6	6.7	1.0	.1	21.4
Clyde Drexler	21	21	40.3	.466	.235	.807	7.4	7.0	1.5	1.0	26.3
Buck Williams	21	21	36.1	.508		.758	8.5	1.0	1.3	.8	9.6
Jerome Kersey	21	21	36.0	.510	.000	.693	7.7	3.6	2.0	.9	16.2
Kevin Duckworth	21	21	30.8	.495		.660	5.6	2.0	.5	.6	11.9
Clifford Robinson	21	0	24.9	.462	.167	.571	4.2	2.0	1.0	1.0	10.8
Danny Ainge	21	0	21.4	.479	.404	.830	1.9	2.3	.7	.0	10.6
Ennis Whatley	15	0	6.4	.300	.000	1.000	.7	.9	.5	.0	1.1
Robert Pack	14	0	3.7	.222		.750	.4	.5	.4	.1	.8
Mark Bryant	12	0	9.7	.345		.750	2.4	.1	.3	.0	1.9
Alaa Abdelnaby	8	0	3.1	.500		.500	.5	.3	.0	.0	1.5
Wayne Cooper	3	0	9.0	.500			2.7	.0	.0	1.0	1.3

- ^{†} Denotes player spent time with another team in the season. Stats reflect time with the Trail Blazers only.

Player statistics citation:

== Awards and honors ==
- Clyde Drexler, NBA All-Star
- Terry Porter, NBA All-Star
- Clifford Robinson, NBA Sixth Man of the Year
