= Morlon Wiley =

American basketball player (born 1966)

Personal information
- Born: September 24, 1966 (age 60) New Orleans, Louisiana, U.S.
- Listed height: 6 ft 4 in (1.93 m)
- Listed weight: 185 lb (84 kg)

Career information
- High school: Long Beach Polytechnic (Long Beach, California)
- College: Long Beach State (1984–1988)
- NBA draft: 1988: 2nd round, 46th overall pick
- Drafted by: Dallas Mavericks
- Playing career: 1988–1999
- Position: Shooting guard
- Number: 20, 11, 21

Career history
- 1988–1989: Dallas Mavericks
- 1989–1991: Orlando Magic
- 1991: Rapid City Thrillers
- 1991: San Antonio Spurs
- 1992–1993: Atlanta Hawks
- 1993: Dallas Mavericks
- 1993: Grand Rapids Hoops
- 1993–1994: Quad City Thunder
- 1994: Miami Heat
- 1994–1995: Dallas Mavericks
- 1995: Atlanta Hawks
- 1995–1998: Quad City Thunder
- 1998–1999: Grand Rapids Hoops

Career highlights
- CBA champion (1994)
- Stats at NBA.com
- Stats at Basketball Reference

Morlon David Wiley (born September 24, 1966) is an American former professional basketball player and former assistant coach for the National Basketball Association's Orlando Magic.

== College career ==
Born in New Orleans, Louisiana, Wiley played college basketball at Long Beach State, where he was a four-year starter for the 49ers. In 1988, he was an all-Big West Conference pick, and his leadership led to the school's first NIT appearance. In his college career, he scored 30 points on six occasions, is third on the all-time list in assists with 425, second in steals with 187, and fourth in free throw percentage with .780. He was inducted into the 49ers' Hall of Fame in 2005.

== Professional career ==
Wiley was drafted in the second round, 46th overall, by the Dallas Mavericks in the 1988 NBA draft. He played a season for the Mavericks, playing in 51 games during the 1988–89 season. In the 1989 NBA Expansion Draft on June 15, Wiley became one of the 12 players chosen by the Orlando Magic to be placed on their first roster. On June 29, Wiley was signed to a two-year contract. In his first season with the Magic, he started a couple games, playing in 40, and averaged 5.7 points and 2.9 assists per game. The following season, he only played 34, and he was waived shortly into the 1991–92 season, having only played 9 games that season for Orlando. He signed onto the San Antonio Spurs, but only played 3 games for them. Wiley then became a member of the Atlanta Hawks for the rest of the season. After playing for parts of the 1991–92 and 1992–93 season, Wiley joined the Mavericks for the rest of the season, in his second stint. After not playing for most of the 1993–94 season, Wiley was signed to a 10-day contract by the Miami Heat on March 9, 1994. He then had a third stint with the Mavericks, playing for them for 12 games at the end of the season. After playing part of the 1994–95 season for the Mavericks in Wiley's third stint, he was traded to the Houston Rockets with a second-round pick for Scott Brooks, in the only trade deadline deal in 1995. Wiley never played for the Rockets, instead ending his career with a 10-day contract with the Hawks.

Morley won a Continental Basketball Association (CBA) championship with the Quad City Thunder in 1994.

After his career ended, Wiley was part of the Dallas Mavericks' player development staff from 2000 to 2004. He then became an assistant coach for the Orlando Magic.

== Personal ==
Wiley is the younger brother of fellow NBA alum Michael Wiley.

== Career statistics ==
Legend
GP	Games played	GS	Games started	MPG	Minutes per game
FG%	Field goal percentage	3P%	3-point field goal percentage	FT%	Free throw percentage
RPG	Rebounds per game	APG	Assists per game	SPG	Steals per game
BPG	Blocks per game	PPG	Points per game	**Bold**	Career high
*	Led the league

=== NBA ===
==== Regular season ====
Year	Team	GP	GS	MPG	FG%	3P%	FT%	RPG	APG	SPG	BPG	PPG
1988–89	Dallas	**51**	1	8.0	.404	.250	**.813**	.9	1.5	.5	.1	2.2
1989–90	Orlando	40	2	16.0	.442	.370	.737	1.3	2.9	1.1	.1	5.7
1990–91	Orlando	34	0	10.3	.417	**.500**	.680	.5	2.1	.7	.0	3.3
1991–92	Orlando	9	0	10.0	.321	.000	.600	.8	1.4	.4	.0	2.3
1991–92	San Antonio	3	0	4.3	**.600**	–	–	.3	.3	.0	.0	2.0
1991–92	Atlanta	41	**19**	18.7	.444	.368	.700	**1.8**	**4.0**	1.0	.1	4.3
1992–93	Atlanta	25	2	14.2	.321	.294	.625	1.4	3.2	1.0	.1	2.9
1992–93	Dallas	33	13	**19.4**	.405	.379	.667	1.7	3.0	**1.2**	.0	**5.8**
1993–94	Miami	4	0	8.5	.375	.250	–	1.0	1.8	.5	.0	1.8
1993–94	Dallas	12	0	10.3	.286	.333	–	.5	1.3	1.1	.0	1.2
1994–95	Dallas	38	2	10.7	.423	.387	.700	1.0	1.8	.6	.0	3.4
1994–95	Atlanta	5	0	3.4	.500	.250	–	.8	1.2	.2	**.2**	1.4
Career		295	39	13.0	.412	.354	.707	1.2	2.4	.8	.1	3.7
