= Donald Hodge (basketball) =

American basketball player (born 1969)

Personal information
- Born: February 25, 1969 (age 57) Washington, D.C., U.S.
- Listed height: 7 ft 0 in (2.13 m)
- Listed weight: 230 lb (104 kg)

Career information
- High school: Calvin Coolidge (Washington, D.C.)
- College: Temple (1989–1991)
- NBA draft: 1991: 2nd round, 33rd overall pick
- Drafted by: Dallas Mavericks
- Position: Center / power forward
- Number: 35

Career history
- 1991–1996: Dallas Mavericks
- 1996: Charlotte Hornets
- 1999: Power Wevelgem

Career highlights
- Third-team Parade All-American (1988); McDonald's All-American (1988)
- Stats at NBA.com
- Stats at Basketball Reference

Donald Jerome Hodge (born February 25, 1969) is an American former professional basketball player.

== Professional career ==
Born in Washington, D.C., Hodge began his sports career as a stellar athlete at Coolidge High School in and later played college basketball at Temple University. He was selected by the Dallas Mavericks in the 2nd round (33rd overall) of the 1991 NBA draft and would go on to average 4.7 ppg in 5 NBA seasons. He played mainly for the Mavericks, where he was a fan favorite, but had a stint with the Charlotte Hornets. He later landed in Europe to play with the Belgium-based Power Wevelgem basketball club.
