= Duane Cooper =

American basketball player (born 1969)

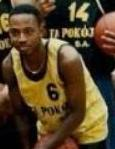

Personal information
- Born: July 25, 1969 (age 57) Benton Harbor, Michigan, U.S.
- Listed height: 6 ft 1 in (1.85 m)
- Listed weight: 185 lb (84 kg)

Career information
- High school: Lakewood (Lakewood, California)
- College: USC (1987–1992)
- NBA draft: 1992: 2nd round, 36th overall pick
- Drafted by: Los Angeles Lakers
- Playing career: 1992–2003
- Position: Point guard
- Number: 5, 11

Career history
- 1992–1993: Los Angeles Lakers
- 1993–1994: Phoenix Suns
- 1994–1995: Omaha Racers
- 1995: Oklahoma City Cavalry
- 1995–1996: Fort Wayne Fury
- 1996–1997: Yakima Sun Kings
- 1997–1998: Pogoń Ruda Śląska
- 1998–1999: Panionios
- 1999: Prokom Trefl Sopot
- 1999–2000: Yakima Sun Kings
- 2000–2001: Pogoń Ruda Śląska
- 2001–2002: Znicz Pruszków
- 2002–2003: Polonia Warsaw

Career highlights
- CBA champion (2000); First-team All-Pac-10 (1992)
- Stats at NBA.com
- Stats at Basketball Reference

Samuel Duane Cooper (born June 25, 1969) is an American former professional basketball player who had a brief career in the National Basketball Association (NBA). Born in Benton Harbor, Michigan, Cooper played college basketballfor the USC Trojans.

Cooper was selected by the Los Angeles Lakers in the second round (36th pick overall) of the 1992 NBA draft. A 6'1" point guard, Cooper played two years in the NBA for the Lakers and Phoenix Suns. In his NBA career, Cooper appeared in a total of 88 games and averaged 2.3 points per game. He also played in pre-season games (but not in any regular season games) for Charlotte Hornets (1995) and Toronto Raptors (1996).

Cooper won a Continental Basketball Association (CBA) championship with the Yakima Sun Kings in 2000.
