= Dexter Cambridge =

Bahamian professional basketball player

Personal information
- Born: January 29, 1970 (age 56) Eleuthera, The Bahamas
- Listed height: 6 ft 7 in (2.01 m)
- Listed weight: 224 lb (102 kg)

Career information
- High school: A.F. Adderly (Nassau, The Bahamas)
- College: Lon Morris (1988–1990); Texas (1990–1992)
- NBA draft: 1992: undrafted
- Playing career: 1992–2001
- Position: Small forward
- Number: 30

Career history
- 1992–1993: Dallas Mavericks
- 1993–1996: Petrarca Padova
- 1996: Gigantes de Carolina
- 1996–1997: Dinamica Gorizia
- 1997: Gigantes de Carolina
- 1997–1998: Dinamica Gorizia
- 1998–1999: Fabriano Basket
- 1999–2000: Regatas San Nicolás
- 2000–2001: Obras Sanitarias
- 2001: Panteras de Miranda

Career highlights
- First-team All-SWC (1992)
- Stats at NBA.com
- Stats at Basketball Reference

Dexter Ryan Cambridge (born January 29, 1970) is a Bahamian former professional basketball player. A 6-foot-7-inch (2.01 m) and 224-pound (102 kg) small forward, he had a brief career in the National Basketball Association (NBA) in early 1993 when he played for the Dallas Mavericks. Cambridge attended American institutions Lon Morris Junior College (in Jacksonville, Texas) and the University of Texas at Austin.

== NCAA suspension ==
In November 1991, he was suspended for two months from playing with the Texas Longhorns by the NCAA for having accepted $7,000 from a fan when he graduated from Lon Morris Junior College in 1990 which affected his amateur status. It was alleged the money was a reward for his being named a junior college All-American. His two-month suspension ended in January 1992 when he mailed a $4,600 check to a booster at the junior college, regaining his eligibility status.
