= 1992–93 Cleveland Cavaliers season =

NBA professional basketball team season

- Head coach: Lenny Wilkens
- General manager: Wayne Embry
- Owners: Gordon Gund; George Gund III
- Arena: Richfield Coliseum

Results
- Record: 54–28 (.659)
- Place: Division: 2nd (Central); Conference: 3rd (Eastern)
- Playoff finish: Conference Semi-finals (lost to Bulls 0–4)
- Stats at Basketball Reference

Local media
- Television: SportsChannel Ohio; WOIO
- Radio: WWWE

The 1992–93 Cleveland Cavaliers season was the 23rd season for the Cleveland Cavaliers in the National Basketball Association.

== Season summary ==
=== Off-season ===
During the off-season, the Cavaliers signed free agent Gerald Wilkins, and later on traded Steve Kerr to the Orlando Magic in exchange for a second-round draft pick, during the first month of the regular season.

=== Regular season ===
With the addition of Wilkins, the Cavaliers struggled playing below .500 in winning percentage with an 8–11 start to the regular season. However, the team soon recovered by posting a seven-game winning streak in December afterwards, and later on held a 34–19 record at the All-Star break. The Cavaliers posted a 12–1 record in February, which included another seven-game winning streak, and then posted a ten-game winning streak in April, finishing in second place in the Central Division with a 54–28 record, and earning the third seed in the Eastern Conference; the team also posted a very successful 35–6 home record at the Coliseum at Richfield during the regular season.

Brad Daugherty averaged 20.2 points, 10.2 rebounds and 4.4 assists per game, while Mark Price averaged 18.2 points and 8.0 assists per game, led the Cavaliers with 122 three-point field goals, and was named to the All-NBA First Team, and Larry Nance provided the team with 16.5 points, 8.7 rebounds and 2.6 blocks per game, and was named to the NBA All-Defensive Second Team. In addition, Craig Ehlo provided with 11.6 points and 1.3 steals per game, while Wilkins contributed 11.1 points per game, and sixth man Hot Rod Williams averaged 11.0 points, 6.2 rebounds and 1.6 blocks per game off the bench. Meanwhile, starting small forward Mike Sanders contributed 8.6 points per game, while also off the bench, second-year guard Terrell Brandon provided with 8.8 points and 3.7 assists per game, and Danny Ferry averaged 7.5 points and 3.7 rebounds per game.

During the NBA All-Star weekend at the Delta Center in Salt Lake City, Utah, Daugherty, Price and Nance were all selected for the 1993 NBA All-Star Game, as members of the Eastern Conference All-Star team; it was the fifth and final All-Star appearance for Daugherty, and the third and final All-Star appearance for Nance. In addition, Price also won the NBA Three-Point Shootout. Price also finished tied in eighth place in Most Valuable Player voting, while Daugherty finished tied in tenth place, and head coach Lenny Wilkens finished in eighth place in Coach of the Year voting.

The Cavaliers finished eighth in the NBA in home-game attendance, with an attendance of 751,465 at the Coliseum at Richfield during the regular season.

=== NBA playoffs ===
In the Eastern Conference First Round of the 1993 NBA playoffs, and for the second consecutive year, the Cavaliers faced off against the 6th–seeded New Jersey Nets, a team that featured Dražen Petrović, Derrick Coleman and Chris Morris. The Nets were without second-year star Kenny Anderson, who was out due to a season-ending wrist injury. The Cavaliers took a 2–1 series lead before losing Game 4 to the Nets on the road, 96–79 at the Brendan Byrne Arena. With the series tied at 2–2, the Cavaliers won Game 5 over the Nets at home, 99–89 at the Coliseum at Richfield to win in a hard-fought five-game series.

In the Eastern Conference Semi-finals, and also for the second consecutive year, the team faced off against the 2nd–seeded, and 2-time defending NBA champion Chicago Bulls, who won the Central Division title, and were led by the trio of All-Star guard Michael Jordan, All-Star forward Scottie Pippen, and Horace Grant. The Cavaliers lost the first two games to the Bulls on the road at the Chicago Stadium, and then lost their next two home games. In Game 4 at the Coliseum at Richfield, Jordan hit another game-winning buzzer-beater against the Cavaliers; the Bulls won the game, 103–101, as the Cavaliers lost the series in a four-game sweep.

The Bulls would go on to defeat the Phoenix Suns in six games in the 1993 NBA Finals, winning their third consecutive NBA championship.

=== Notable highlights ===
A forgotten highlight of the regular season occurred on January 15, 1993, in a road game against the Indiana Pacers at the Market Square Arena; after trailing to the Pacers at halftime, 64–49, the Cavaliers rallied and set a franchise record by scoring 83 points in the second half to win the game, 132–120.

=== Aftermath ===
Following the season, Wilkens resigned and took a coaching job with the Atlanta Hawks, while Ehlo signed as a free agent with the Hawks, and Sanders retired. Until the 2023–24 season, this would be the final time that the Cavaliers won an NBA playoff series without future All-Star LeBron James, who was selected by the team as the first overall pick in the 2003 NBA draft.

== Draft picks ==
The Cavaliers did not have any draft picks in 1992.

== Roster ==
1992–93 Cleveland Cavaliers roster
Players

Pos.	No.	Player	Height	Weight	DOB	From
SG	10	John Battle	6 ft 2 in (1.88 m)	175 lb (79 kg)	1962–11–09	Rutgers
PG	11	Terrell Brandon	5 ft 11 in (1.80 m)	180 lb (82 kg)	1970–05–20	Oregon
C	43	Brad Daugherty	7 ft 0 in (2.13 m)	245 lb (111 kg)	1965–10–19	North Carolina
SG	3	Craig Ehlo	6 ft 6 in (1.98 m)	180 lb (82 kg)	1961–08–11	Washington State
PF	35	Danny Ferry	6 ft 10 in (2.08 m)	230 lb (104 kg)	1966–10–17	Duke
C	54	Jay Guidinger	6 ft 10 in (2.08 m)	255 lb (116 kg)	1969–08–18	Minnesota Duluth
SF	30	Jerome Lane	6 ft 6 in (1.98 m)	230 lb (104 kg)	1966–12–04	Pittsburgh
SF	22	Larry Nance	6 ft 10 in (2.08 m)	205 lb (93 kg)	1959–02–12	Clemson
SG	14	Bobby Phills	6 ft 5 in (1.96 m)	210 lb (95 kg)	1969–12–20	Southern
PG	25	Mark Price	6 ft 0 in (1.83 m)	170 lb (77 kg)	1964–02–15	Georgia Tech
SF	33	Mike Sanders	6 ft 6 in (1.98 m)	210 lb (95 kg)	1960–05–07	UCLA
SF	21	Gerald Wilkins	6 ft 6 in (1.98 m)	185 lb (84 kg)	1963–09–11	Chattanooga
C	18	Hot Rod Williams	6 ft 11 in (2.11 m)	215 lb (98 kg)	1962–08–09	Tulane

Coaches
Head coach
- Lenny Wilkens
Assistant(s)
- Dick Helm
- Brian Winters

Legend
- (DP) Unsigned draft pick
- (FA) Free agent
- (S) Suspended
- Injured

Roster
Updated: December 2, 1992

== Regular season ==
=== Season standings ===
Central Division	W	L	PCT	GB	Home	Road	Div
y-Chicago Bulls	57	25	.695	—	31–10	26–15	19–9
x-Cleveland Cavaliers	54	28	.659	3	35–6	19–22	22–6
x-Charlotte Hornets	44	38	.537	13	22–19	22–19	12–16
x-Atlanta Hawks	43	39	.524	14	25–16	18–23	12–16
x-Indiana Pacers	41	41	.500	16	27–14	14–27	11–17
Detroit Pistons	40	42	.488	17	28–13	12–29	12–16
Milwaukee Bucks	28	54	.341	29	18–23	10–31	10–18

y – clinched division title
x – clinched playoff spot

#	Eastern Conference				
#	Team	W	L	PCT	GB
1	c-New York Knicks	60	22	.732	–
2	y-Chicago Bulls	57	25	.695	3
3	x-Cleveland Cavaliers	54	28	.659	6
4	x-Boston Celtics	48	34	.585	12
5	x-Charlotte Hornets	44	38	.537	16
6	x-New Jersey Nets	43	39	.524	17
7	x-Atlanta Hawks	43	39	.524	17
8	x-Indiana Pacers	41	41	.500	19
9	Orlando Magic	41	41	.500	19
10	Detroit Pistons	40	42	.488	20
11	Miami Heat	36	46	.439	24
12	Milwaukee Bucks	28	54	.341	32
13	Philadelphia 76ers	26	56	.317	36
14	Washington Bullets	22	60	.268	38

z – clinched division title
y – clinched division title
x – clinched playoff spot

=== Game log ===
1992–93 game log
Total: 54–28 (home: 35–6; road: 19–22)
November: 6–6 (home: 4–2; road: 2–4)

Game	Date	Team	Score	High points	High rebounds	High assists	Location Attendance	Record
1	November 6, 1992; 8:00 p.m. EST	Chicago	L 96–101	Nance (24)	Daugherty (12)	Price (8)	Richfield Coliseum; 20,273	0–1
2	November 8, 1992	Charlotte	W 127–107				Richfield Coliseum	1–1
3	November 10, 1992	Washington						
4	November 12, 1992	@ Golden State						
5	November 13, 1992	@ Portland						
6	November 15, 1992	@ Sacramento						
7	November 17, 1992	@ San Antonio	L 95–106				HemisFair Arena	3–4
8	November 19, 1992	@ Houston	L 92–99				The Summit	3–5
9	November 21, 1992	@ Dallas						
10	November 24, 1992	Milwaukee						
11	November 25, 1992	@ Milwaukee						
12	November 27, 1992; 7:30 pm EST	Atlanta	W 122–101	Price, Wilkins (20)	Nance (14)	Price (7)	Richfield Coliseum; 20,273	6–6
13	November 28, 1992	@ Orlando						

December: 11–5 (home: 8–3; road: 3–2)

Game	Date	Team	Score	High points	High rebounds	High assists	Location Attendance	Record
14	December 1, 1992	Boston						
15	December 3, 1992	New York	W 100–90				Richfield Coliseum	8–7
16	December 5, 1992	Portland						
17	December 8, 1992	L.A. Clippers	L 106–115				Richfield Coliseum	8–9
18	December 9, 1992; 8:30 p.m. EST	@ Chicago	L 91–108	Ferry (16)	Daugherty (8)	Brandon, Wilkins (4)	Chicago Stadium; 18,142	8–10
19	December 11, 1992	@ Detroit						
20	December 12, 1992	Seattle	W 97–93				Richfield Coliseum	10–10
21	December 15, 1992	Houston	W 124–97				Richfield Coliseum	11–10
22	December 16, 1992	@ Philadelphia						
23	December 18, 1992	Sacramento						
24	December 19, 1992	Utah	W 121–104				Richfield Coliseum	14–10
25	December 21, 1992	@ Washington						
26	December 23, 1992	Indiana						
27	December 26, 1992	New Jersey	L 114–119				Richfield Coliseum	15–12
28	December 28, 1992	Detroit						
29	December 29, 1992; 7:30 pm EST	@ Atlanta	W 114–96	Daugherty,Nance (22)	Daugherty (13)	Price (7)	The Omni; 10,703	17–12

January: 8–6 (home: 6–1; road: 2–5)

Game	Date	Team	Score	High points	High rebounds	High assists	Location Attendance	Record
30	January 2, 1993	L.A. Lakers	W 106–91				Richfield Coliseum	18–12
31	January 5, 1993	@ New York	L 91–95				Madison Square Garden	18–13
32	January 6, 1993; 7:30 p.m. EST	Chicago	W 117–95	Price (30)	Daugherty (12)	Price (13)	Richfield Coliseum; 20,273	19–13
33	January 9, 1993	Minnesota						
34	January 12, 1993	Boston						
35	January 13, 1993	@ New Jersey	L 98–104				Brendan Byrne Arena	20–15
36	January 15, 1993	@ Indiana						
37	January 16, 1993; 7:30 pm EST	Atlanta	W 127–99	Nance (20)	Nance (14)	Brandon (9)	Richfield Coliseum; 20,273	22–15
38	January 20, 1993; 7:30 p.m. EST	Phoenix	W 123–119	Price (26)	Daugherty (17)	Daugherty (7)	Richfield Coliseum; 20,273	23–15
39	January 22, 1993	@ L.A. Clippers	W 100–92				Los Angeles Memorial Sports Arena	24–15
40	January 23, 1993	@ Denver						
41	January 26, 1993	@ Utah	L 96–113				Delta Center	24–17
42	January 28, 1993	Orlando						
43	January 30, 1993	@ Miami						

February: 12–1 (home: 6–0; road: 6–1)

Game	Date	Team	Score	High points	High rebounds	High assists	Location Attendance	Record
44	February 2, 1993	Golden State						
45	February 3, 1993	@ Milwaukee						
46	February 5, 1993	Detroit						
47	February 6, 1993; 7:30 pm EST	@ Atlanta	W 120–109	Daugherty (28)	Nance (11)	Price (7)	The Omni; 15,381	29–18
48	February 9, 1993	@ Charlotte	W 107–103				Charlotte Coliseum	30–18
49	February 10, 1993	@ Orlando						
50	February 12, 1993	Milwaukee						
51	February 13, 1993; 8:30 p.m. EST	@ Chicago	W 116–111	Daugherty (25)	Daugherty (9)	Price (10)	Chicago Stadium; 18,676	32–19
52	February 15, 1993	Indiana						
53	February 17, 1993	Dallas						
All-Star Break
54	February 23, 1993	Miami						
55	February 26, 1993	@ L.A. Lakers	W 114–102				Great Western Forum	36–19
56	February 28, 1993; 3:30 p.m. EST	@ Phoenix	W 101–94	Nance, Price (21)	Nance (17)	Price (11)	America West Arena; 19,023	37–19

March: 6–6 (home: 4–1; road: 2–5)

Game	Date	Team	Score	High points	High rebounds	High assists	Location Attendance	Record
57	March 2, 1993	@ Seattle	L 105–108				Seattle Center Coliseum	37–20
58	March 4, 1993	@ Minnesota						
59	March 7, 1993	@ Boston						
60	March 8, 1993	Denver						
61	March 11, 1993	Charlotte	W 118–99				Richfield Coliseum	40–21
62	March 15, 1993	@ Washington						
63	March 16, 1993	Philadelphia						
64	March 18, 1993	New York	L 95–115				Richfield Coliseum	41–23
65	March 20, 1993	@ Miami						
66	March 23, 1993	San Antonio	L 95–115				Richfield Coliseum	42–24
67	March 26, 1993	@ Philadelphia						
68	March 28, 1993	@ Detroit						

April: 11–3 (home: 7–0; road: 4–3)

Game	Date	Team	Score	High points	High rebounds	High assists	Location Attendance	Record
69	April 1, 1993	@ New York	L 83–91				Madison Square Garden	43–26
70	April 2, 1993	@ Charlotte	L 113–114				Charlotte Coliseum	43–27
71	April 4, 1993	New Jersey	W 105–99				Richfield Coliseum	44–27
72	April 6, 1993	Miami						
73	April 9, 1993	Washington						
74	April 10, 1993	@ New Jersey	W 100–99				Brendan Byrne Arena	47–27
75	April 13, 1993; 7:30 pm EDT	@ Atlanta	W 112–109 (2 OT)	Price (24)	Daugherty (17)	Daugherty, Price (7)	The Omni; 9,450	48–27
76	April 15, 1993	@ Milwaukee						
77	April 16, 1993	Orlando						
78	April 18, 1993; 5:30 p.m. EDT	Chicago	W 103–94	Nance (19)	Nance (12)	Price (8)	Richfield Coliseum; 20,273	51–27
79	April 20, 1993	Detroit						
80	April 21, 1993	@ Indiana						
81	April 23, 1993	@ Boston						
82	April 25, 1993	Philadelphia						

1992–93 schedule

== Playoffs ==
1993 playoff game log
Eastern Conference First Round: 3–2 (home: 2–1; road: 1–1)

Game	Date	Team	Score	High points	High rebounds	High assists	Location Attendance	Series
1	April 29, 1993	New Jersey	W 114–98	Ehlo (16)	Daugherty (14)	Price (7)	Richfield Coliseum; 18,339	1–0
2	May 1, 1993	New Jersey	L 99–101	Nance, Price (17)	Nance (12)	Price (11)	Richfield Coliseum; 20,273	1–1
3	May 5, 1993	@ New Jersey	W 93–84	Nance (23)	Nance (17)	Price (4)	Brendan Byrne Arena; 16,453	2–1
4	May 7, 1993	@ New Jersey	L 79–96	Daugherty (29)	Daugherty, Ferry, Nance, Williams (5)	Price (6)	Brendan Byrne Arena; 15,238	2–2
1	May 9, 1993	New Jersey	W 99–89	Daugherty (24)	Daugherty (20)	Daugherty (8)	Richfield Coliseum; 17,388	3–2

Eastern Conference Semifinals: 0–4 (home: 0–2; road: 0–2)

Game	Date	Team	Score	High points	High rebounds	High assists	Location Attendance	Record
1	May 11, 1993; 8:00 p.m. EDT	@ Chicago	L 84–91	wilkins (19)	Daugherty, Nance (8)	Daugherty (6)	Chicago Stadium; 18,676	0–1
2	May 13, 1993; 8:00 p.m. EDT	@ Chicago	L 85–104	Nance (16)	Daugherty, Nance (7)	Price (8)	Chicago Stadium; 18,676	0–2
3	May 15, 1993; 2:30 p.m. EDT	Chicago	L 90–96	Nance (24)	Daugherty (11)	Daugherty, Ehol, Price (6)	Richfield Coliseum; 20,273	0–3
4	May 17, 1993; 8:00 p.m. EDT	Chicago	L 101–103	Daugherty (25)	Daugherty (13)	Price, Wilkins (6)	Richfield Coliseum; 20,274	0–4

1993 schedule

== Player statistics ==
Legend
GP	Games played	GS	Games started	MPG	Minutes per game
FG%	Field-goal percentage	3P%	3-point field-goal percentage	FT%	Free-throw percentage
RPG	Rebounds per game	APG	Assists per game	SPG	Steals per game
BPG	Blocks per game	PPG	Points per game

=== Season ===
Player	GP	GS	MPG	FG%	3P%	FT%	RPG	APG	SPG	BPG	PPG
Brad Daugherty	71	71	37.9	57.1	50.0	79.5	10.2	4.4	0.7	0.8	20.2
Mark Price	75	74	31.7	48.4	41.6	94.8	2.7	8.0	1.2	0.1	18.2
Larry Nance	77	77	35.8	54.9	0.0	81.8	8.7	2.9	0.7	2.6	16.5
Craig Ehlo	82	73	31.2	49.0	38.1	71.7	4.9	3.1	1.3	0.3	11.6
Gerald Wilkins	80	35	26.0	45.3	27.6	84.0	2.7	2.3	1.0	0.2	11.1
Hot Rod Williams	67	13	30.7	47.0	0.0	71.6	6.2	2.3	0.7	1.6	11.0
Terrell Brandon	82	8	19.8	47.8	31.0	82.5	2.2	3.7	1.0	0.3	8.8
Mike Sanders	53	51	22.4	49.7	25.0	75.6	3.2	1.4	0.7	0.6	8.6
Danny Ferry	76	1	19.2	47.9	41.5	87.6	3.7	1.8	0.4	0.6	7.5
John Battle	41	0	12.1	41.5	16.7	77.8	0.7	1.3	0.2	0.1	5.4
Bobby Phills	31	0	4.5	46.3	40.0	60.0	0.5	0.3	0.3	0.1	3.0
Jerome Lane	21	2	7.1	50.0	0.0	25.0	2.5	0.8	0.6	0.1	2.8
Steve Kerr	5	0	8.2	50.0	0.0	100.0	1.4	2.2	0.4	0.0	2.4
Jay Guidinger	32	5	6.7	34.5	0.0	52.0	2.0	0.5	0.3	0.3	1.6

=== Playoffs ===
Player	GP	GS	MPG	FG%	3P%	FT%	RPG	APG	SPG	BPG	PPG
Brad Daugherty	9	9	39.6	55.7	0.0	80.0	11.7	3.4	0.7	0.8	18.7
Larry Nance	9	9	36.6	56.5	0.0	76.7	8.2	2.3	0.9	1.6	16.1
Mark Price	9	9	32.0	44.3	30.8	95.8	2.1	6.1	1.7	0.0	13.0
Craig Ehlo	9	9	32.1	41.8	38.5	80.0	3.4	2.8	1.3	0.4	10.9
Gerald Wilkins	9	2	26.2	43.7	33.3	76.5	1.8	2.7	1.0	0.2	10.3
Hot Rod Williams	9	0	26.3	40.0	0.0	75.0	4.6	1.9	0.6	1.6	9.0
Terrell Brandon	8	0	16.5	43.5	40.0	100.0	2.1	2.1	0.9	0.4	6.4
Mike Sanders	8	7	18.1	41.7	0.0	60.0	2.3	1.3	1.0	0.1	5.8
Danny Ferry	8	0	14.8	38.2	44.4	90.0	3.1	1.8	0.5	0.4	4.9
Bobby Phills	2	0	4.5	33.3	0.0	100.0	0.0	0.0	0.0	0.0	2.0
Jay Guidinger	4	0	3.8	33.3	0.0	0.0	0.3	0.0	0.0	0.3	0.5
John Battle	1	0	6.0	0.0	0.0	0.0	1.0	1.0	0.0	0.0	0.0

Player statistics citation:

== Awards and records ==
- Mark Price, All-NBA First Team
- Larry Nance, NBA All-Defensive Second Team
