= 1992–93 New Jersey Nets season =

NBA professional basketball team season

- Head coach: Chuck Daly
- General manager: Willis Reed
- Arena: Brendan Byrne Arena

Results
- Record: 43–39 (.524)
- Place: Division: 3rd (Atlantic); Conference: 6th (Eastern)
- Playoff finish: First round (lost to Cavaliers 2–3)
- Stats at Basketball Reference

Local media
- Television: WWOR-TV; SportsChannel New York
- Radio: WNEW

The 1992–93 New Jersey Nets season was the Nets' 26th season in the National Basketball Association, and 17th season in East Rutherford, New Jersey.

== Season summary ==
=== Off-season ===
During the off-season, the Nets hired Chuck Daly as their new head coach; Daly led the Detroit Pistons to two consecutive NBA championships between 1989 and 1990. The team also acquired Rumeal Robinson from the Atlanta Hawks, acquired Jayson Williams from the Philadelphia 76ers, and signed free agents Chucky Brown and Rick Mahorn.

=== Regular season ===
Under Daly and with the addition of Robinson, the Nets struggled with a 4–7 start to the regular season, but then posted a six-game winning streak between November and December afterwards, and later on held a 30–21 record at the All-Star break. However, the team lost second-year star Kenny Anderson for the remainder of the season due to a wrist injury after 55 games. At mid-season, the team signed free agents, former All-Star guard Maurice Cheeks, and former All-Star forward Bernard King. Despite losing ten of their final eleven games of the season, which included a seven-game losing streak in April, the Nets finished in third place in the Atlantic Division with a 43–39 record, and earned the sixth seed in the Eastern Conference; it was the team's first winning season above .500 in winning percentage since the 1983–84 season.

Dražen Petrović averaged 22.3 points, 3.5 assists and 1.3 steals per game, while Derrick Coleman averaged 20.7 points, 11.2 rebounds, 3.6 assists and 1.7 blocks per game, and Anderson showed improvement becoming the Nets' starting point guard, as he provided the team with 16.9 points, 8.2 assists and 1.7 steals per game. In addition, Chris Morris contributed 14.1 points, 5.9 rebounds and 1.9 steals per game, while Sam Bowie provided with 9.1 points, 7.0 rebounds and 1.6 blocks per game, and Robinson contributed 8.4 points, 4.0 assists and 1.2 steals per game. Off the bench, King avareged 7.0 points per game in 32 games, while Rafael Addison contributed 6.3 points per game, Brown provided with 5.1 points and 3.0 rebounds per game, Mahorn averaged 3.9 points and 3.8 rebounds per game, Cheeks contributed 3.6 points and 3.1 assists per game in 35 games, and Chris Dudley provided with 3.5 points, 7.2 rebounds and 1.5 blocks per game.

Petrović and Coleman were both named to the All-NBA Third Team, while Anderson finished in third place in Most Improved Player voting, with Coleman and Petrović both finishing in eighth and tied in eleventh place respectively, and Daly finished in fifth place in Coach of the Year voting. Despite stellar seasons, neither Petrović, Coleman or Anderson were selected for the 1993 NBA All-Star Game in Salt Lake City, Utah. The Nets finished 15th in the NBA in home-game attendance, with an attendance of 620,416 at the Brendan Byrne Arena during the regular season.

=== NBA playoffs ===
In the Eastern Conference First Round of the 1993 NBA playoffs, and for the second consecutive year, the Nets faced off against the 3rd–seeded Cleveland Cavaliers, who were led by the All-Star trio of Brad Daugherty, Mark Price and Larry Nance. With Anderson out due to his season-ending wrist injury, the Nets used Robinson as their starting point guard in his absence. The Cavaliers took a 2–1 series lead before the Nets won Game 4 at home, 96–79 at the Brendan Byrne Arena to even the series. However, the Nets lost Game 5 to the Cavaliers on the road, 99–89 at the Coliseum at Richfield, thus losing in a hard-fought five-game series.

=== Aftermath ===
Following the season, Bowie was traded to the Los Angeles Lakers after four seasons with the Nets, while Dudley signed as a free agent with the Portland Trail Blazers, Brown signed with the Dallas Mavericks, Addison was released to free agency, and King and Cheeks both retired.

Tragedy struck the Nets in the following off-season, as Petrović was killed in a car accident in Germany at the age of 28 on June 7, 1993; Petrović was a passenger in a car driven by his girlfriend, which lost control and crashed head-on into a truck on a rain-drenched highway near Munich, Germany. Shortly before his death, Petrović last played for the Croatian national basketball team in the European Championships in Wroclaw, Poland. The Nets retired Petrović's number 3 jersey later on that year, during a game against the Indiana Pacers at the Brenden Byrne Arena on November 11, during the next season; he would later on be inducted into the Basketball Hall of Fame posthumously in 2002.

Petrović's girlfriend, Hungarian model and basketball player, Klara Szalantzy, 23, was not seriously hurt in the accident, while another passenger, Hilal Edebal, 23, was seriously injured with certain lifelong consequences. Edebal was also a basketball player, and played overseas in Turkey, but had to retire after the accident; reports of the accident misidentified her name as "Hilal Haene", and her age as 53.

== Draft picks ==
Round	Pick	Player	Position	Nationality	College
2	29	P. J. Brown	PF	United States	Louisiana Tech
2	40	Steve Rogers	SG	United States	Alabama State

== Roster ==
1992–93 New Jersey Nets roster
Players

Pos.	No.	Player	Height	Weight	DOB	From
F	21	Rafael Addison	6 ft 7 in (2.01 m)	215 lb (98 kg)	1964-07-22	Syracuse
G	7	Kenny Anderson (injured)	6 ft 0 in (1.83 m)	168 lb (76 kg)	1970-10-09	Georgia Tech
C	31	Sam Bowie	7 ft 1 in (2.16 m)	235 lb (107 kg)	1961-03-17	Kentucky
F	52	Chucky Brown	6 ft 7 in (2.01 m)	214 lb (97 kg)	1968-02-29	NC State
G	10	Maurice Cheeks	6 ft 1 in (1.85 m)	180 lb (82 kg)	1956-09-08	West Texas A&M
F	44	Derrick Coleman	6 ft 10 in (2.08 m)	230 lb (104 kg)	1967-06-21	Syracuse
C	22	Chris Dudley (injured)	6 ft 11 in (2.11 m)	235 lb (107 kg)	1965-02-22	Yale
G	12	Tate George	6 ft 5 in (1.96 m)	190 lb (86 kg)	1968-05-29	Connecticut
F	30	Bernard King	6 ft 7 in (2.01 m)	205 lb (93 kg)	1956-12-04	Tennessee
F	4	Rick Mahorn	6 ft 10 in (2.08 m)	240 lb (109 kg)	1958-09-21	Hampton
F	34	Chris Morris	6 ft 8 in (2.03 m)	210 lb (95 kg)	1966-01-20	Auburn
G	3	Dražen Petrović	6 ft 5 in (1.96 m)	195 lb (88 kg)	1964-10-22	Croatia
G	24	Rumeal Robinson	6 ft 2 in (1.88 m)	195 lb (88 kg)	1966-11-13	Michigan
C	33	Dwayne Schintzius	7 ft 1 in (2.16 m)	260 lb (118 kg)	1968-10-14	Florida
F	55	Jayson Williams (injured)	6 ft 9 in (2.06 m)	240 lb (109 kg)	1968-02-22	St. John's

Coaches
Head coach
- Chuck Daly
Assistant(s)
- Rick Carlisle
- Paul Silas
- Brendan Suhr

Legend
- (DP) Unsigned draft pick
- (FA) Free agent
- (S) Suspended
- Injured

Roster

Roster notes

- Point guard Rumeal Robinson holds both American and Jamaican citizenships.

== Regular season ==
=== Season standings ===
Atlantic Division	W	L	PCT	GB	Home	Road	Div
y-New York Knicks	60	22	.732	—	37–4	23–18	23–5
x-Boston Celtics	48	34	.585	12	28–13	20–21	19–9
x-New Jersey Nets	43	39	.524	17	26–15	17–24	14–14
Orlando Magic	41	41	.500	19	27–14	14–27	15–13
Miami Heat	36	46	.439	24	26–15	10–31	9–19
Philadelphia 76ers	26	56	.317	34	15–26	11–30	11–17
Washington Bullets	22	60	.268	38	15–26	7–34	7–21

#	Eastern Conference				
#	Team	W	L	PCT	GB
1	c-New York Knicks	60	22	.732	–
2	y-Chicago Bulls	57	25	.695	3
3	x-Cleveland Cavaliers	54	28	.659	6
4	x-Boston Celtics	48	34	.585	12
5	x-Charlotte Hornets	44	38	.537	16
6	x-New Jersey Nets	43	39	.524	17
7	x-Atlanta Hawks	43	39	.524	17
8	x-Indiana Pacers	41	41	.500	19
9	Orlando Magic	41	41	.500	19
10	Detroit Pistons	40	42	.488	20
11	Miami Heat	36	46	.439	24
12	Milwaukee Bucks	28	54	.341	32
13	Philadelphia 76ers	26	56	.317	36
14	Washington Bullets	22	60	.268	38

z – clinched division title
y – clinched division title
x – clinched playoff spot

== Game log ==
=== Regular season ===
1992–93 game log
Total: 49–33 (Home: 26–15; Road: 23–18)
November: 7–7 (home: 2–4; road: 5–3)

Game	Date	Team	Score	High points	High rebounds	High assists	Location Attendance	Record
3	November 10, 1992	@ New York	L 96–99				Madison Square Garden	1–2
7	November 17, 1992	Utah	L 97–108				Brendan Byrne Arena	3–4
11	November 24, 1992	@ Seattle	L 97–103				Seattle Center Coliseum	4–7
12	November 25, 1992	@ L.A. Lakers	W 100–98				Great Western Forum	5–7
13	November 27, 1992	@ Utah	W 112–110				Delta Center	6–7

December: 9–5 (home: 5–3; road: 4–2)

Game	Date	Team	Score	High points	High rebounds	High assists	Location Attendance	Record
16	December 4, 1992	San Antonio	W 108–103 (OT)				Brendan Byrne Arena	9–7
18	December 8, 1992; 7:30 p.m. EST	Phoenix	L 100–105	Morris (25)	Morris (12)	Anderson (7)	Brendan Byrne Arena; 16,514	10–8
19	December 10, 1992	L.A. Clippers	W 111–105				Brendan Byrne Arena	10–9
20	December 12, 1992; 8:30 p.m. EST	@ Chicago	L 89–95	Petrović (25)	Bowie (17)	Anderson, Petrović (6)	Chicago Stadium; 18,232	11–9
21	December 15, 1992	New York	L 94–108				Brendan Byrne Arena	11–10
26	December 26, 1992	@ Cleveland	W 119–114				Richfield Coliseum	14–12
27	December 28, 1992	Charlotte	W 104–103				Brendan Byrne Arena	15–12

January: 8–7 (home: 6–1; road: 2–6)

Game	Date	Team	Score	High points	High rebounds	High assists	Location Attendance	Record
29	January 2, 1993	@ Charlotte	L 117–118				Charlotte Coliseum	16–13
34	January 13, 1993	Cleveland	W 104–98				Brendan Byrne Arena	19–15
38	January 21, 1993; 7:30 p.m. EST	Chicago	L 94–107	Anderson, Coleman (22)	Coleman (12)	Anderson (12)	Brendan Byrne Arena; 20,049	22–16
40	January 24, 1993	Houston	W 100–83				Brendan Byrne Arena	23–17
41	January 26, 1993	L.A. Lakers	W 106–91				Brendan Byrne Arena	24–17
43	January 30, 1993	@ Houston	L 105–108				The Summit	24–19

February: 7–5 (home: 5–1; road: 2–4)

Game	Date	Team	Score	High points	High rebounds	High assists	Location Attendance	Record
45	February 2, 1993	@ San Antonio	L 93–111				HemisFair Arena	25–20
46	February 4, 1993	Seattle	W 113–103 (OT)				Brendan Byrne Arena	26–20
All-Star Break
52	February 23, 1993	@ Charlotte	L 95–104				Charlotte Coliseum	30–22
55	February 28, 1993	New York	W 102–76				Brendan Byrne Arena	31–24

March: 10–5 (home: 7–1; road: 3–4)

Game	Date	Team	Score	High points	High rebounds	High assists	Location Attendance	Record
56	March 2, 1993; 8:00 p.m. EST	Chicago	L 80–87	Coleman (22)	Dudley (13)	Coleman, George (4)	Brendan Byrne Arena; 20,049	31–25
59	March 10, 1993	@ L.A. Clippers	W 109–98				Los Angeles Memorial Sports Arena	34–25
61	March 13, 1993; 9:30 p.m. EST	@ Phoenix	W 124–93	Petrović (29)	Coleman (12)	Robinson (10)	America West Arena; 19,023	36–25
67	March 24, 1993	Charlotte	W 118–116				Brendan Byrne Arena	40–27

April: 2–10 (home: 1–5; road: 1–5)

Game	Date	Team	Score	High points	High rebounds	High assists	Location Attendance	Record
72	April 2, 1993; 8:00 p.m. EST	@ Chicago	L 105–118	Coleman (30)	Mahorn (11)	Coleman (7)	Chicago Stadium; 18,676	42–30
73	April 4, 1993	@ Cleveland	L 99–105				Richfield Coliseum	42–31
76	April 10, 1993	Cleveland	L 99–100				Brendan Byrne Arena	42–34
80	April 21, 1993	@ New York	L 74–105				Madison Square Garden	43–37

1992–93 schedule

== Playoffs ==
1993 playoff game log
Eastern Conference First Round: 2–3 (home: 1–1; road: 1–2)

Game	Date	Team	Score	High points	High rebounds	High assists	Location Attendance	Series
1	April 29, 1993	@ Cleveland	L 98–114	Coleman (31)	Coleman (10)	Cheeks, George (5)	Richfield Coliseum; 18,339	0–1
2	May 1, 1993	@ Cleveland	W 101–99	Coleman (27)	Coleman (14)	Robinson (9)	Richfield Coliseum; 20,273	1–1
3	May 5, 1993	Cleveland	L 84–93	Coleman (22)	Coleman (13)	Robinson (9)	Brendan Byrne Arena; 16,453	1–2
4	May 7, 1993	Cleveland	W 96–79	Morris (22)	Coleman (14)	Coleman, Robinson (8)	Brendan Byrne Arena; 15,238	2–2
1	May 9, 1993	@ Cleveland	L 89–99	Coleman (33)	Coleman (16)	Robinson (6)	Richfield Coliseum; 17,388	2–3

1993 schedule

== Player statistics ==
Legend
GP	Games played	GS	Games started	MPG	Minutes per game
FG%	Field-goal percentage	3P%	3-point field-goal percentage	FT%	Free-throw percentage
RPG	Rebounds per game	APG	Assists per game	SPG	Steals per game
BPG	Blocks per game	PPG	Points per game

=== Regular season ===
Player	GP	GS	MPG	FG%	3P%	FT%	RPG	APG	SPG	BPG	PPG
Dražen Petrović	70	67	38.0	.518	.449	.870	2.7	3.5	1.3	0.2	22.3
Derrick Coleman	76	73	36.3	.460	.232	.808	11.2	3.6	1.2	1.7	20.7
Kenny Anderson	55	55	36.5	.435	.280	.776	4.1	8.2	1.7	0.2	16.9
Chris Morris	77	57	29.9	.481	.224	.794	5.9	1.4	1.9	0.7	14.1
Sam Bowie	79	65	26.5	.450	.333	.779	7.0	1.6	0.4	1.6	9.1
Rumeal Robinson	80	28	19.8	.423	.357	.574	2.0	4.0	1.2	0.2	8.4
Bernard King	32	2	13.4	.514	.286	.684	2.4	0.6	0.3	0.1	7.0
Rafael Addison	68	15	17.1	.443	.206	.814	1.9	0.8	0.3	0.2	6.3
Chucky Brown	77	20	15.4	.483	.000	.724	3.0	0.7	0.3	0.3	5.1
Jayson Williams	12	2	11.6	.457		.389	3.4	0.0	0.3	0.3	4.1
Rick Mahorn	74	9	14.6	.472	.333	.800	3.8	0.4	0.3	0.4	3.9
Maurice Cheeks	35	0	14.6	.548	.000	.889	1.2	3.1	0.9	0.1	3.6
Chris Dudley	71	16	19.7	.353		.518	7.2	0.2	0.2	1.5	3.5
Tate George	48	1	7.9	.378	.000	.833	0.6	1.2	0.2	0.1	2.5
Dwayne Schintzius	5	0	7.0	.286		1.000	1.6	0.4	0.4	0.4	1.4
Dan O'Sullivan	3	0	3.3	.667			1.3	0.0	0.0	0.0	1.3
Doug Lee	5	0	6.6	.286	.333		0.4	1.0	0.0	0.2	1.0
Dave Hoppen	2	0	5.0	1.000		.000	2.0	0.0	0.0	0.0	1.0

=== Playoffs ===
Player	GP	GS	MPG	FG%	3P%	FT%	RPG	APG	SPG	BPG	PPG
Derrick Coleman	5	5	45.0	.532	.417	.806	13.4	4.6	1.2	2.6	26.8
Chris Morris	5	4	32.6	.557	.375	.917	6.4	1.4	1.6	1.2	17.0
Dražen Petrović	5	5	38.6	.455	.333	.800	1.8	1.8	0.4	0.0	15.6
Rumeal Robinson	5	5	27.2	.429	.286	.714	2.4	7.0	1.0	0.0	9.8
Chucky Brown	4	0	15.5	.409		.857	2.3	0.3	0.8	0.8	6.0
Dwayne Schintzius	5	0	21.2	.448		.500	5.0	0.8	0.2	1.2	5.8
Maurice Cheeks	5	0	16.4	.478		.000	1.2	2.8	1.2	0.2	4.4
Rafael Addison	5	0	10.6	.333		1.000	1.2	1.0	0.6	0.0	3.4
Sam Bowie	3	3	23.7	.444		1.000	4.0	0.7	2.0	0.3	3.3
Bernard King	3	1	8.0	.571			0.3	0.0	0.3	0.0	2.7
Rick Mahorn	4	2	15.8	.400			3.3	0.8	0.0	0.5	2.0
Tate George	2	0	11.0	.286			1.5	3.0	0.5	0.0	2.0

Player statistics citation:

== Awards, Records and Honors ==
- Dražen Petrović, All-NBA Third Team
- Derrick Coleman, All-NBA Third Team
