= 1992–93 Charlotte Hornets season =

NBA professional basketball team season

- Head coach: Allan Bristow
- General manager: Dave Twardzik
- Owner: George Shinn
- Arena: Charlotte Coliseum

Results
- Record: 44–38 (.537)
- Place: Division: 3rd (Central); Conference: 5th (Eastern)
- Playoff finish: Conference semifinals (lost to Knicks 1–4)
- Stats at Basketball Reference

Local media
- Television: WJZY; SportSouth (Steve Martin, Gil McGregor)
- Radio: WBT (Matt Pinto, Gerry Vaillancourt)

The 1992–93 Charlotte Hornets season was the fifth season for the Charlotte Hornets in the National Basketball Association.

== Season summary ==
=== Off-season ===
The Hornets received the second overall pick in the 1992 NBA draft, and selected center Alonzo Mourning out of Georgetown University.

=== Regular season ===
During the first month of the regular season, the Hornets signed free agent David Wingate, and then later on traded J.R. Reid to the San Antonio Spurs in exchange for Sidney Green in December. The team also released Tom Hammonds to free agency, as he later on signed with the Denver Nuggets.

With the addition of Mourning and Wingate, the Hornets struggled losing four of their first six games of the season, but then posted a five-game winning streak afterwards, and later on held a 26–23 record at the All-Star break. The team won nine of their final twelve games of the season, which included a five-game winning streak to close the season. The Hornets showed improvement finishing in third place in the Central Division with a 44–38 record, earning the fifth seed in the Eastern Conference, and qualifying for their first ever NBA playoff appearance.

Second-year star Larry Johnson averaged 22.1 points, 10.5 rebounds and 4.3 assists per game, and was named to the All-NBA Second Team, while Mourning averaged 21.0 points, 10.3 rebounds and 3.5 blocks per game, and was named to the NBA All-Rookie First Team, and Kendall Gill provided the team with 16.9 points and 1.4 steals per game. In addition, sixth man Dell Curry contributed 15.3 points per game off the bench, while Johnny Newman contributed 11.9 points per game, Muggsy Bogues provided with 10.0 points, 8.8 assists and 2.0 steals per game, Kenny Gattison averaged 6.8 points and 4.7 rebounds per game, and Wingate contributed 6.1 points per game.

During the NBA All-Star weekend at the Delta Center in Salt Lake City, Utah, Johnson was selected for the 1993 NBA All-Star Game, as a member of the Eastern Conference All-Star team; it was his first ever All-Star appearance. Mourning finished in second place in Rookie of the Year voting, behind Shaquille O'Neal of the Orlando Magic, while Curry finished in fourth place in Sixth Man of the Year voting. The Hornets led the NBA in home-game attendance for the fourth time in five seasons, with an attendance of 971,880 at the Charlotte Coliseum during the regular season.

=== NBA playoffs ===
In the Eastern Conference First Round of the 1993 NBA playoffs, the Hornets faced off against the 4th–seeded Boston Celtics, a team that featured All-Star guard Reggie Lewis, Xavier McDaniel and Robert Parish. The Hornets lost Game 1 to the Celtics on the road, 112–101 at the Boston Garden; Lewis collapsed on the court during the game, and was out for the remainder of the series. The Hornets managed to win the next three games, which included a Game 4 win over the Celtics at home, 104–103 at the Charlotte Coliseum, as Mourning sunk a 20-foot jumper at the buzzer; the Hornets won the series over the Celtics in four games, and became the first of the four expansion franchises of the late 1980s to win an NBA playoff series.

In the Eastern Conference Semi-finals, the team faced off against the top–seeded, and Atlantic Division champion New York Knicks, who were led by the trio of All-Star center Patrick Ewing, John Starks and Charles Oakley. The Hornets lost the first two games to the Knicks on the road at Madison Square Garden, but managed to win Game 3 at the Charlotte Coliseum in double-overtime, 110–106. However, the Hornets lost the next two games, including a Game 5 loss to the Knicks at Madison Square Garden, 105–101, thus losing the series in five games.

=== Aftermath ===
Following the season, Gill was traded to the Seattle SuperSonics, and Green was released to free agency.

== Offseason ==
=== NBA draft ===
Round	Pick	Player	Position	Nationality	College
1	2	Alonzo Mourning	C	United States	Georgetown
2	35	Tony Bennett	PG	United States	Wisconsin–Green Bay

== Roster ==
1992–93 Charlotte Hornets roster
Players

Pos.	No.	Player	Height	Weight	DOB	From
PG	25	Tony Bennett	6 ft 0 in (1.83 m)	175 lb (79 kg)	1969–06–01	Green Bay
PG	1	Muggsy Bogues	5 ft 3 in (1.60 m)	136 lb (62 kg)	1965–01–09	Wake Forest
SG	30	Dell Curry	6 ft 4 in (1.93 m)	190 lb (86 kg)	1964–06–25	Virginia Tech
PF	44	Kenny Gattison	6 ft 8 in (2.03 m)	225 lb (102 kg)	1964–05–23	Old Dominion
SG	13	Kendall Gill	6 ft 5 in (1.96 m)	195 lb (88 kg)	1968–05–25	Illinois
C	42	Mike Gminski	6 ft 11 in (2.11 m)	250 lb (113 kg)	1959–08–03	Duke
PF	21	Sidney Green	6 ft 9 in (2.06 m)	220 lb (100 kg)	1961–01–04	UNLV
PF	2	Larry Johnson	6 ft 6 in (1.98 m)	250 lb (113 kg)	1969–03–14	UNLV
SG	9	Kevin Lynch	6 ft 5 in (1.96 m)	195 lb (88 kg)	1968–12–24	Minnesota
C	33	Alonzo Mourning	6 ft 10 in (2.08 m)	240 lb (109 kg)	1970–02–08	Georgetown
SF	22	Johnny Newman	6 ft 7 in (2.01 m)	190 lb (86 kg)	1963–11–28	Richmond
SF	55	David Wingate	6 ft 5 in (1.96 m)	185 lb (84 kg)	1963–12–15	Georgetown

Coaches
Head coach
- Allan Bristow
Assistant(s)
- T. R. Dunn
- Bill Hanzlik

Legend
- (DP) Unsigned draft pick
- (FA) Free agent
- (S) Suspended
- Injured

Roster
Updated: January 26, 1993

== Regular season ==
=== Season standings ===
Central Division	W	L	PCT	GB	Home	Road	Div
y-Chicago Bulls	57	25	.695	—	31–10	26–15	19–9
x-Cleveland Cavaliers	54	28	.659	3	35–6	19–22	22–6
x-Charlotte Hornets	44	38	.537	13	22–19	22–19	12–16
x-Atlanta Hawks	43	39	.524	14	25–16	18–23	12–16
x-Indiana Pacers	41	41	.500	16	27–14	14–27	11–17
Detroit Pistons	40	42	.488	17	28–13	12–29	12–16
Milwaukee Bucks	28	54	.341	29	18–23	10–31	10–18

#	Eastern Conference				
#	Team	W	L	PCT	GB
1	c-New York Knicks	60	22	.732	–
2	y-Chicago Bulls	57	25	.695	3
3	x-Cleveland Cavaliers	54	28	.659	6
4	x-Boston Celtics	48	34	.585	12
5	x-Charlotte Hornets	44	38	.537	16
6	x-New Jersey Nets	43	39	.524	17
7	x-Atlanta Hawks	43	39	.524	17
8	x-Indiana Pacers	41	41	.500	19
9	Orlando Magic	41	41	.500	19
10	Detroit Pistons	40	42	.488	20
11	Miami Heat	36	46	.439	24
12	Milwaukee Bucks	28	54	.341	32
13	Philadelphia 76ers	26	56	.317	36
14	Washington Bullets	22	60	.268	38

z - clinched division title
y - clinched division title
x - clinched playoff spot

== Game log ==
=== Regular season ===
1992–93 game log
Total: 44–38 (home: 22–19; road: 22–19)
November: 7–6 (home: 4–3; road: 3–3)

Game	Date	Team	Score	High points	High rebounds	High assists	Location Attendance	Record
1	November 6, 1992	Washington	W 126–119				Charlotte Coliseum	1–0
2	November 8, 1992	@ Cleveland	L 107–127				Richfield Coliseum	1–1
3	November 10, 1992	@ Orlando	W 112–108				Orlando Arena	2–1
4	November 11, 1992	Boston	L 99–109				Charlotte Coliseum	2–2
5	November 13, 1992	@ Indiana	L 109–110				Market Square Arena	2–3
6	November 14, 1992	Miami	L 95–104				Charlotte Coliseum	2–4
7	November 17, 1992	Dallas	W 134–111				Charlotte Coliseum	3–4
8	November 20, 1992	Golden State	W 117–110 (OT)				Charlotte Coliseum	4–4
9	November 21, 1992	@ Miami	W 123–111				Miami Arena	5–4
10	November 24, 1992	Philadelphia	W 127–119				Charlotte Coliseum	6–4
11	November 25, 1992	@ Detroit	W 101–97				The Palace of Auburn Hills	7–4
12	November 27, 1992	@ Boston	L 102–111				Boston Garden	7–5
13	November 28, 1992	Indiana	L 122–134				Charlotte Coliseum	7–6

December: 7–7 (home: 2–3; road: 5–4)

Game	Date	Team	Score	High points	High rebounds	High assists	Location Attendance	Record
14	December 1, 1992; 9:30 p.m. EST	@ Phoenix	L 90–109	Johnson (27)	Johnson (11)	Bogues (12)	America West Arena; 19,023	7–7
15	December 2, 1992	@ Golden State	W 111–110				Oakland-Alameda County Coliseum Arena	8–7
16	December 4, 1992	@ Sacramento	W 112–111				ARCO Arena	9–7
17	December 5, 1992	@ L.A. Clippers	L 109–119				Los Angeles Memorial Sports Arena	9–8
18	December 9, 1992; 7:30 p.m. EST	Phoenix	L 101–110	Johnson (29)	Johnson (12)	Bogues (14)	Charlotte Coliseum; 23,698	9–9
19	December 10, 1992	@ New York	W 110–103 (OT)				Madison Square Garden	10–9
20	December 12, 1992	Denver	W 109–100				Charlotte Coliseum	11–9
21	December 15, 1992; 8:30 p.m. EST	@ Chicago	L 110–125	Curry (26)	Johnson (14)	Bogues (9)	Chicago Stadium; 18,088	11–10
22	December 16, 1992	Utah	L 91–93				Charlotte Coliseum	11–11
23	December 19, 1992	@ Washington	W 126–117				Capital Centre	12–11
24	December 22, 1992	@ Atlanta	W 130–114				The Omni	13–11
25	December 23, 1992	Detroit	W 107–95				Charlotte Coliseum	14–11
26	December 28, 1992	@ New Jersey	L 103–104				Brendan Byrne Arena	14–12
27	December 29, 1992; 7:30 p.m. EST	Chicago	L 103–104	Newman (28)	Johnson (9)	Bogues (10)	Charlotte Coliseum; 23,698	14–13

January: 6–7 (home: 3–4; road: 3–3)

Game	Date	Team	Score	High points	High rebounds	High assists	Location Attendance	Record
28	January 2, 1993	New Jersey	W 104–103				Charlotte Coliseum	15–13
29	January 5, 1993	Boston	L 103–107				Charlotte Coliseum	15–14
30	January 8, 1993	L.A. Clippers	W 115–101				Charlotte Coliseum	16–14
31	January 11, 1993	@ Dallas	W 132–113				Reunion Arena	17–14
32	January 14, 1993	@ Houston	L 107–111				The Summit	17–15
33	January 16, 1993	@ San Antonio	L 111–124				HemisFair Arena	17–16
34	January 19, 1993	Atlanta	L 100–102				Charlotte Coliseum	17–17
35	January 20, 1993	@ New York	L 91–114				Madison Square Garden	17–18
36	January 22, 1993; 8:30 p.m. EST	@ Chicago	W 105–97	Curry, Gill, Mourning (19)	Johnson (19)	Bogues (12)	Chicago Stadium; 18,676	18–18
37	January 24, 1993	Indiana	L 105–112				Charlotte Coliseum	18–19
38	January 27, 1993	Sacramento	W 117–107				Charlotte Coliseum	19–19
39	January 29, 1993	L.A. Lakers	L 108–123				Charlotte Coliseum	19–20
40	January 30, 1993	@ Washington	W 127–121 (OT)				Capital Centre	20–20

February: 8–5 (home: 6–2; road: 2–3)

Game	Date	Team	Score	High points	High rebounds	High assists	Location Attendance	Record
41	February 1, 1993	Seattle	W 112–100	Gill, Johnson, Mourning (19)	Johnson (11)	Bogues (11)	Charlotte Coliseum	21–20
42	February 3, 1993	@ Philadelphia	W 129–118				The Spectrum	22–20
43	February 5, 1993	Milwaukee	W 118–111				Charlotte Coliseum	22–20
44	February 9, 1993	Cleveland	L 103–107				Charlotte Coliseum	23–21
45	February 11, 1993	Orlando	W 116–107				Charlotte Coliseum	24–21
46	February 12, 1993	@ Miami	W 116–107				Miami Arena	25–21
47	February 14, 1993	Detroit	W 117–107				Charlotte Coliseum	26–21
48	February 15, 1993	@ Milwaukee	L 122–128				Bradley Center	26–22
49	February 17, 1993	New York	L 116–124				Charlotte Coliseum	26–23
All-Star Break
50	February 23, 1993	New Jersey	W 104–95				Charlotte Coliseum	27–23
51	February 25, 1993	San Antonio	W 111–104				Charlotte Coliseum	28–23
52	February 26, 1993	@ Indiana	L 105–137				Market Square Arena	28–24
53	February 28, 1993	@ Denver	L 103–110				McNichols Sports Arena	28–25

March: 7–10 (home: 2–4; road: 5–6)

Game	Date	Team	Score	High points	High rebounds	High assists	Location Attendance	Record
54	March 1, 1993	@ Utah	W 110–107				Delta Center	29–24
55	March 4, 1993	@ Seattle	L 112–138	Johnson (24)	Johnson (11)	Bogues (13)	Seattle Center Coliseum	29–26
56	March 5, 1993	@ Portland	W 94–92				Memorial Coliseum	30–26
57	March 7, 1993	@ L.A. Lakers	W 105–101				Great Western Forum	31–26
58	March 9, 1993	Washington	W 124–104				Charlotte Coliseum	32–26
59	March 11, 1993	@ Cleveland	L 99–118				Richfield Coliseum	32–27
60	March 12, 1993; 8:30 p.m. EST	@ Chicago	L 108–123	Mourning (25)	Mourning (8)	Gill (6)	Chicago Stadium; 18,676	32–28
61	March 14, 1993	@ Boston	W 96–93				Boston Garden	33–28
62	March 16, 1993	Atlanta	L 107–122				Charlotte Coliseum	33–29
63	March 18, 1993	Minnesota	W 113–85				Charlotte Coliseum	34–29
64	March 19, 1993	@ Indiana	L 108–112				Market Square Arena	34–30
65	March 21, 1993	@ Minnesota	W 99–95				Target Center	35–30
66	March 23, 1993	Houston	L 103–111				Charlotte Coliseum	35–31
67	March 24, 1993	@ New Jersey	L 116–118				Brendan Byrne Arena	35–32
68	March 26, 1993	@ Detroit	L 107–115				The Palace of Auburn Hills	35–33
69	March 28, 1993	Portland	L 114–121				Charlotte Coliseum	35–34
70	March 30, 1993	Miami	L 89–116				Charlotte Coliseum	35–35

April: 9–3 (home: 5–3; road: 4–0)

Game	Date	Team	Score	High points	High rebounds	High assists	Location Attendance	Record
71	April 1, 1993	@ Orlando	W 102–93				Orlando Arena	36–35
72	April 2, 1993	Cleveland	W 114–113				Charlotte Coliseum	37–35
73	April 7, 1993	Orlando	L 96–109				Charlotte Coliseum	37–36
74	April 9, 1993	@ Philadelphia	W 122–113				The Spectrum	38–36
75	April 10, 1993	Atlanta	L 105–118				Charlotte Coliseum	38–37
76	April 12, 1993	Philadelphia	W 120–101				Charlotte Coliseum	39–37
77	April 14, 1993	New York	L 107–111				Charlotte Coliseum	39–38
78	April 16, 1993	Detroit	W 127–93				Charlotte Coliseum	40–38
79	April 17, 1993	@ Atlanta	W 110–107				The Omni	41–38
80	April 21, 1993	Milwaukee	W 119–111				Charlotte Coliseum	41–38
81	April 23, 1993; 8:00 p.m. EDT	Chicago	W 104–103	Johnson (31)	Johnson (14)	Bogues (6)	Charlotte Coliseum; 23,698	43–38
82	April 24, 1993	@ Milwaukee	W 108–106				Bradley Center	44–38

1992–93 schedule

== Playoffs ==
1993 playoff game log
Total: 4–5 (home: 3–1; road: 1–4)
Eastern Conference First Round: 3–1 (home: 2–0; road: 1–1)

Game	Date	Team	Score	High points	High rebounds	High assists	Location Attendance	Series
1	April 29, 1993	@ Boston	L 101–112	Gill, Mourning (30)	Johnson (13)	Bogues (15)	Boston Garden; 14,890	0–1
2	May 1, 1993	@ Boston	W 99–98 (2OT)	Johnson (23)	Mourning (14)	Bogues (8)	Boston Garden; 14,890	1–1
3	May 3, 1993	Boston	W 119–89	Johnson (29)	Johnson (11)	Bogues (7)	Charlotte Coliseum; 23,698	2–1
4	May 5, 1993	Boston	W 104–103	Mourning (33)	Mourning (7)	Bogues (9)	Charlotte Coliseum; 23,698	3–1

Eastern Conference Semifinals: 1–4 (home: 1–1; road: 0–3)

Game	Date	Team	Score	High points	High rebounds	High assists	Location Attendance	Series
1	May 9, 1993	@ New York	L 95–111	Mourning (27)	Mourning (13)	Bogues (8)	Madison Square Garden; 19,763	0–1
2	May 12, 1993	@ New York	L 101–105 (OT)	Mourning (24)	Green (10)	Bogues (7)	Madison Square Garden; 19,763	0–2
3	May 14, 1993	New York	W 110–106 (2OT)	Mourning (34)	Mourning (10)	Bogues (8)	Charlotte Coliseum; 23,698	1–2
4	May 16, 1993	New York	L 92–94	Johnson (24)	Mourning (8)	Bogues (5)	Charlotte Coliseum; 23,698	1–3
5	May 18, 1993	@ New York	L 101–105	Gill (26)	Mourning (12)	Gill (6)	Madison Square Garden; 19,763	1–4

1993 schedule

== Player statistics ==
=== Regular season ===
Player	POS	GP	GS	MP	REB	AST	STL	BLK	PTS	MPG	RPG	APG	SPG	BPG	PPG
Larry Johnson	PF	82	82	3,323	864	353	53	27	1,810	40.5	10.5	4.3	.6	.3	22.1
Muggsy Bogues	PG	81	80	2,833	298	711	161	5	808	35.0	3.7	8.8	2.0	.1	10.0
Dell Curry	SG	80	0	2,094	286	180	87	23	1,227	26.2	3.6	2.3	1.1	.3	15.3
Alonzo Mourning	C	78	78	2,644	805	76	27	271	1,639	33.9	10.3	1.0	.3	3.5	21.0
Kenny Gattison	PF	75	5	1,475	353	68	48	55	508	19.7	4.7	.9	.6	.7	6.8
Tony Bennett	PG	75	2	857	63	136	30	0	276	11.4	.8	1.8	.4	.0	3.7
David Wingate	SF	72	55	1,471	174	183	66	9	440	20.4	2.4	2.5	.9	.1	6.1
Kendall Gill	SG	69	67	2,430	340	268	98	36	1,167	35.2	4.9	3.9	1.4	.5	16.9
Johnny Newman	SF	64	27	1,471	143	117	45	19	764	23.0	2.2	1.8	.7	.3	11.9
Kevin Lynch	SG	40	8	324	35	25	11	6	86	8.1	.9	.6	.3	.2	2.2
Mike Gminski	C	34	0	251	85	7	1	9	93	7.4	2.5	.2	.0	.3	2.7
Sidney Green^{†}	PF	24	0	127	47	5	1	2	40	5.3	2.0	.2	.0	.1	1.7
Tom Hammonds^{†}	PF	19	5	142	31	8	0	4	43	7.5	1.6	.4	.0	.2	2.3
J. R. Reid^{†}	PF	17	1	295	70	24	11	5	127	17.4	4.1	1.4	.6	.3	7.5
Lorenzo Williams^{†}	C	2	0	18	9	0	0	2	2	9.0	4.5	.0	.0	1.0	1.0

- ^{†} Denotes player spent time with another team in the season. Stats reflect time with the Hornets only.

=== Playoffs ===
Player	POS	GP	GS	MP	REB	AST	STL	BLK	PTS	MPG	RPG	APG	SPG	BPG	PPG
Alonzo Mourning	C	9	9	367	89	13	6	31	214	40.8	9.9	1.4	.7	3.4	23.8
Kendall Gill	SG	9	9	353	46	26	21	6	156	39.2	5.1	2.9	2.3	.7	17.3
Larry Johnson	PF	9	9	348	62	30	5	2	178	38.7	6.9	3.3	.6	.2	19.8
Muggsy Bogues	PG	9	9	346	36	70	24	0	88	38.4	4.0	7.8	2.7	.0	9.8
Johnny Newman	SF	9	9	173	19	18	10	1	68	19.2	2.1	2.0	1.1	.1	7.6
Dell Curry	SG	9	0	222	32	18	13	0	99	24.7	3.6	2.0	1.4	.0	11.0
Kenny Gattison	PF	9	0	187	39	11	5	1	53	20.8	4.3	1.2	.6	.1	5.9
David Wingate	SF	9	0	117	12	15	4	1	19	13.0	1.3	1.7	.4	.1	2.1
Sidney Green	PF	9	0	78	29	1	1	1	15	8.7	3.2	.1	.1	.1	1.7
Tony Bennett	PG	8	0	86	9	13	2	1	30	10.8	1.1	1.6	.3	.1	3.8
Mike Gminski	C	2	0	5	1	0	0	0	2	2.5	.5	.0	.0	.0	1.0
Kevin Lynch	SG	1	0	3	0	1	0	0	0	3.0	.0	1.0	.0	.0	.0

== Awards and records ==
- Larry Johnson, All-NBA Second Team
- Alonzo Mourning, NBA All-Rookie Team 1st Team

== Transactions ==
- August 31, 1992

Signed LaMark Baker as a free agent.

- October 2, 1992

Signed Lorenzo Williams as a free agent.

- October 7, 1992

Elliot Perry signed as an unrestricted free agent with the Portland Trail Blazers.

- November 2, 1992

Waived LaMark Baker.

- November 12, 1992

Waived Lorenzo Williams.

- November 18, 1992

Signed David Wingate as a free agent.

- December 9, 1992

Traded J.R. Reid to the San Antonio Spurs for Sidney Green, a 1993 1st round draft pick (Scott Burrell was later selected) and a 1996 2nd round draft pick (Ronnie Henderson was later selected).

- January 26, 1993

Waived Tom Hammonds.

Player Transactions Citation:
