= 1992–93 Milwaukee Bucks season =

NBA professional basketball team season

- Head coach: Mike Dunleavy
- General manager: Mike Dunleavy
- Owner: Herb Kohl
- Arena: Bradley Center

Results
- Record: 28–54 (.341)
- Place: Division: 7th (Central); Conference: 12th (Eastern)
- Playoff finish: Did not qualify
- Stats at Basketball Reference

Local media
- Television: WCGV-TV; Prime Sports Upper Midwest (Jim Paschke, Jon McGlocklin)
- Radio: WTMJ

The 1992–93 Milwaukee Bucks season was the 25th season for the Milwaukee Bucks in the National Basketball Association.

== Season summary ==
=== Off-season ===
The Bucks received the eighth overall pick in the 1992 NBA draft, and selected shooting guard Todd Day from the University of Arkansas; the team also selected Day's University of Arkansas teammate, point guard Lee Mayberry with the 23rd overall pick. During the off-season, the Bucks acquired Blue Edwards, and second-year guard Eric Murdock from the Utah Jazz on draft day, and hired Mike Dunleavy as their new head coach and general manager.

=== Regular season ===
Under Dunleavy and with the addition of Edwards, Murdock, Day and Mayberry, the Bucks got off to a strong start by winning 10 of their first 13 games of the regular season. However, the team soon struggled posting an 11-game losing streak in December afterwards, then posted a seven-game losing streak in January, and later on held a 20–31 record at the All-Star break. Moses Malone only played just eleven games due to a back injury. At mid-season, the Bucks traded Alvin Robertson to the Detroit Pistons in exchange for Orlando Woolridge, who only played in just eight games for the team due to a broken hand injury, while the team signed free agent Derek Strong. The Bucks lost their final eight games of the season, and finished in last place in the Central Division with a disappointing 28–54 record.

Edwards averaged 16.9 points and 1.6 steals per game, while Frank Brickowski averaged 16.9 points and 6.1 rebounds per game, and Murdock provided the team with 14.4 points, 7.6 assists and 2.2 steals per game. In addition, Day averaged 13.8 points per game, but was not named to an NBA All-Rookie Team at season's end, while rookie power forward Anthony Avent contributed 9.8 points and 6.2 rebounds per game. Off the bench, Brad Lohaus averaged 9.1 points per game, while Fred Roberts contributed 7.6 points per game, Strong provided with 6.8 points and 5.0 rebounds per game in 23 games, Mayberry contributed 5.2 points and 3.3 assists per game, and Danny Schayes averaged 4.6 points and 3.6 rebounds per game.

Murdock finished in second place in Most Improved Player voting, behind Chris Jackson of the Denver Nuggets, while Edwards finished tied in ninth place. The Bucks finished tenth in the NBA in home-game attendance, with an attendance of 660,939 at the Bradley Center during the regular season.

=== Aftermath ===
Following the season, Malone and Woolridge both left for free agency and signed with the Philadelphia 76ers, whom Malone used to play for, and with Woolridge signing during the next season, and Roberts was released.

== Draft picks ==
Round	Pick	Player	Position	Nationality	College
1	8	Todd Day	SG	United States	Arkansas
1	23	Lee Mayberry	PG	United States	Arkansas

== Roster ==
1992–93 Milwaukee Bucks roster
Players

Pos.	No.	Player	Height	Weight	DOB	From
PF	00	Anthony Avent	6 ft 9 in (2.06 m)	235 lb (107 kg)	1969–10–18	Seton Hall
SG	17	Jon Barry	6 ft 4 in (1.93 m)	195 lb (88 kg)	1969–07–25	Georgia Tech
PF	40	Frank Brickowski	6 ft 9 in (2.06 m)	240 lb (109 kg)	1959–08–14	Penn State
SG	10	Todd Day	6 ft 6 in (1.98 m)	188 lb (85 kg)	1970–01–07	Arkansas
SF	30	Blue Edwards	6 ft 4 in (1.93 m)	200 lb (91 kg)	1965–10–31	East Carolina
PF	54	Brad Lohaus	6 ft 11 in (2.11 m)	230 lb (104 kg)	1964–09–29	Iowa
C	8	Moses Malone (injured)	6 ft 10 in (2.08 m)	260 lb (118 kg)	1955–03–23	Petersburg HS (VA)
PG	11	Lee Mayberry	6 ft 1 in (1.85 m)	172 lb (78 kg)	1970–06–12	Arkansas
PG	3	Eric Murdock	6 ft 1 in (1.85 m)	190 lb (86 kg)	1968–06–14	Providence
PF	34	Fred Roberts	6 ft 10 in (2.08 m)	218 lb (99 kg)	1960–08–14	BYU
C	24	Danny Schayes	6 ft 11 in (2.11 m)	235 lb (107 kg)	1959–05–10	Syracuse
PF	20	Derek Strong	6 ft 8 in (2.03 m)	220 lb (100 kg)	1968–02–09	Xavier
PG	7	Sam Vincent (injured) (IN)	6 ft 2 in (1.88 m)	185 lb (84 kg)	1963–05–18	Michigan State
PF	6	Orlando Woolridge (injured)	6 ft 9 in (2.06 m)	215 lb (98 kg)	1959–12–16	Notre Dame

Coaches
Head coach
- Mike Dunleavy, Sr.
Assistant(s)
- Butch Carter
- Jim Eyen
- Frank Hamblen
- Larry Riley

Legend
- (DP) Unsigned draft pick
- (FA) Free agent
- (S) Suspended
- (IN) Inactive
- Injured

=== Roster Notes ===
- Point guard Sam Vincent was on the injured reserve list due to a ruptured Achilles tendon, missed the entire regular season, and never played for the Bucks.

== Regular season ==
=== Season standings ===
Central Division	W	L	PCT	GB	Home	Road	Div
y-Chicago Bulls	57	25	.695	—	31–10	26–15	19–9
x-Cleveland Cavaliers	54	28	.659	3	35–6	19–22	22–6
x-Charlotte Hornets	44	38	.537	13	22–19	22–19	12–16
x-Atlanta Hawks	43	39	.524	14	25–16	18–23	12–16
x-Indiana Pacers	41	41	.500	16	27–14	14–27	11–17
Detroit Pistons	40	42	.488	17	28–13	12–29	12–16
Milwaukee Bucks	28	54	.341	29	18–23	10–31	10–18

y - clinched division title
x - clinched playoff spot

#	Eastern Conference				
#	Team	W	L	PCT	GB
1	c-New York Knicks	60	22	.732	–
2	y-Chicago Bulls	57	25	.695	3
3	x-Cleveland Cavaliers	54	28	.659	6
4	x-Boston Celtics	48	34	.585	12
5	x-Charlotte Hornets	44	38	.537	16
6	x-New Jersey Nets	43	39	.524	17
7	x-Atlanta Hawks	43	39	.524	17
8	x-Indiana Pacers	41	41	.500	19
9	Orlando Magic	41	41	.500	19
10	Detroit Pistons	40	42	.488	20
11	Miami Heat	36	46	.439	24
12	Milwaukee Bucks	28	54	.341	32
13	Philadelphia 76ers	26	56	.317	36
14	Washington Bullets	22	60	.268	38

z - clinched division title
y - clinched division title
x - clinched playoff spot

=== Game log ===
1992–93 game log
Total: 28–54 (Home: 18–23; Road: 10–31)
November: 9–3 (home: 5–1; road: 4–2)

Game	Date	Team	Score	High points	High rebounds	High assists	Location Attendance	Record
1	November 6, 1992	@ Detroit	W 86—81	Frank Brickowski (19)	Frank Brickowski, Alvin Robertson (7)	Eric Murdock (8)	The Palace of Auburn Hills; 21,454	1–0
2	November 7, 1992	Boston	W 124–88	Blue Edwards (30)	Anthony Avent (10)	Eric Murdock (9)	Bradley Center; 17,892	2–0
3	November 10, 1992	@ San Antonio	L 98–104	Brad Lohaus, Alvin Robertson (19)	Brad Lohaus (9)	Eric Murdock (11)	HemisFair Arena; 16,057	2–1
4	November 11, 1992	@ Dallas	W 124–116	Blue Edwards (31)	Anthony Avent, Frank Brickowski (8)	Eric Murdock (8)	Reunion Arena; 11,276	3–1
5	November 13, 1992	Chicago	L 96–101	Eric Murdock (25)	Frank Brickowski (10)	Eric Murdock (9)	Bradley Center; 18,633	3–2
6	November 15, 1992	Denver	W 115–98	Blue Edwards (32)	Blue Edwards (9)		Bradley Center; 14,882	4–2
7	November 17, 1992	@ Atlanta	W 114—106				The Omni; 7,771	5–2
8	November 21, 1992	Indiana	W 105–95				Bradley Center; 18,214	6–2
9	November 24, 1992	@ Cleveland	L 105–109				Richfield Coliseum; 15,312	6–3
10	November 25, 1992	Cleveland	W 94–85				Bradley Center; 15,634	7–3
11	November 27, 1992	@ Philadelphia	W 86—81				The Spectrum; 11,831	8–3
12	November 28, 1992	Washington	W 97–95				Bradley Center; 18,028	9–3

December: 2–12 (home: 2–4; road: 0–8)

Game	Date	Team	Score	High points	High rebounds	High assists	Location Attendance	Record
13	December 2, 1992	Miami	W 100–97				Bradley Center; 14,516	10–3
14	December 3, 1992	@ Washington	L 95–113				Capital Centre; 7,711	10–4
15	December 5, 1992	@ New York	L 95–113				Madison Square Garden; 19,763	10–5
16	December 6, 1992	Phoenix	L 112–122				Bradley Center; 16,646	10–6
17	December 8, 1992	@ Portland	L 97–126				Memorial Coliseum; 12,888	10–7
18	December 10, 1992	@ Golden State	L 102–114				Oakland Arena; 15,025	10–8
19	December 12, 1992	@ Utah	L 82–108				Delta Center; 19,911	10–9
20	December 13, 1992	@ L. A. Lakers	L 96–114				The Forum; 13,265	10–10
21	December 15, 1992	@ Seattle	L 100–108				Seattle Center Coliseum; 10,327	10–11
22	December 17, 1992	New Jersey	L 101–102				Bradley Center; 13,986	10–12
23	December 19, 1992	Detroit	L 90–103	Blue Edwards (26)	Frank Brickowski (10)	Lee Mayberry, Alvin Robertson (5)	Bradley Center; 17,264	10–13
24	December 22, 1992	Sacramento	L 99–102	Eric Murdock (30)	Eric Murdock (15)	Alvin Robertson (6)	Bradley Center; 14,536	10–14
25	December 26, 1992	New York	W 102–100 OT	Todd Day (22)	Anthony Avent (9)	Frank Brickowski. Blue Edwards (6)	Bradley Center; 17,862	11–14
26	December 28, 1992	@ Orlando	L 94–110				Orlando Arena; 15,151	11–15

January: 3–3 (home: 2–2; road: 1–1)

Game	Date	Team	Score	High points	High rebounds	High assists	Location Attendance	Record
27	January 2, 1993	@ Atlanta	W 106–93				Omni Coliseum; 14,349	12–15
28	January 3, 1993	L. A. Lakers	W 109–101				Bradley Center; 15,881	13–15
29	January 5, 1993	Minnesota	W 114–100				Bradley Center; 14,085	14–15
30	January 7, 1993	Atlanta	L 94–100				Bradley Center; 15,124	14–16
31	January 8, 1993	@ Chicago	L 95–120				Chicago Stadium; 15,124	14–17
32	January 10, 1993	L. A. Clippers	L 99–104				Bradley Center; 14,034	14–18

February: 0–1 (home: 0–1; road: 0–0)

Game	Date	Team	Score	High points	High rebounds	High assists	Location Attendance	Record
45	February 7, 1993	New Jersey	L 102–102				Bradley Center; 18,633	18–27

March: 2–0 (home: 2–0; road: 0–0)

Game	Date	Team	Score	High points	High rebounds	High assists	Location Attendance	Record
56	March 2, 1993	Dallas	W 120–86				Bradley Center; 13,794	22–34
57	March 5, 1993	Orlando	W 109–91				Bradley Center; 18,633	23–34

April: 0–1 (home: 0–1; road: 0–0)

Game	Date	Team	Score	High points	High rebounds	High assists	Location Attendance	Record
82	April 24, 1993	Charlotte	L 106–108				Bradley Center; 18,633	28–54

1992–93 schedule

== Player statistics ==
Legend
GP	Games played	GS	Games started	MPG	Minutes per game
FG%	Field-goal percentage	3P%	3-point field-goal percentage	FT%	Free-throw percentage
RPG	Rebounds per game	APG	Assists per game	SPG	Steals per game
BPG	Blocks per game	PPG	Points per game

Player	GP	GS	MPG	FG%	3FG%	FT%	RPG	APG	SPG	BPG	PPG
Blue Edwards	82	81	33.3	51.2	34.9	79.0	4.7	2.6	1.6	0.5	16.9
Frank Brickowski	66	64	31.4	54.5	30.8	72.8	6.1	3.0	1.2	0.7	16.9
Eric Murdock	79	78	30.8	46.8	26.1	78.0	3.6	7.6	2.2	0.1	14.4
Todd Day	71	37	27.2	43.2	29.3	71.7	4.1	1.6	1.1	0.7	13.8
Anthony Avent	82	78	27.9	43.3	0.0	65.1	6.2	1.1	0.7	0.9	9.8
Brad Lohaus	80	24	22.1	46.1	37.0	72.3	3.5	1.6	0.6	0.9	9.1
Alvin Robertson	39	32	27.3	47.9	30.9	62.9	3.5	4.0	2.3	0.2	8.7
Fred Roberts	79	5	18.8	52.8	41.4	79.9	3.0	1.5	0.7	0.3	7.6
Derek Strong	23	0	14.7	45.7	50.0	80.0	5.0	0.6	0.5	0.0	6.8
Orlando Woolridge	8	0	9.8	54.5	0.0	77.8	1.1	0.4	0.1	0.3	5.4
Alaa Abdelnaby	12	0	13.3	46.4	0.0	75.0	3.1	0.8	0.5	0.3	5.3
Lee Mayberry	82	4	18.3	45.6	39.1	57.4	1.4	3.3	0.7	0.1	5.2
Danny Schayes	70	7	16.1	39.9	0.0	81.8	3.6	1.1	0.5	0.5	4.6
Moses Malone	11	0	9.5	31.0	0.0	77.4	4.2	0.6	0.1	0.7	4.5
Jon Barry	47	0	11.7	36.9	33.3	67.3	0.9	1.4	0.7	0.1	4.4
Alex Stivrins	3	0	8.3	36.4	0.0	75.0	2.0	0.7	0.3	0.0	3.7
Alan Ogg	3	0	8.7	33.3	0.0	100.0	2.0	1.3	0.3	1.0	2.7
Anthony Pullard	8	0	4.6	44.4	0.0	33.3	1.0	0.3	0.3	0.3	2.1
Dan O'Sullivan	3	0	2.3	50.0	0.0	75.0	0.7	0.3	0.3	0.0	1.7

Player statistics citation:

== Transactions ==
=== Trades ===
June 24, 1992
To Milwaukee Bucks----
- Blue Edwards
- Eric Murdock
- 1992 1st round pick (Lee Mayberry)
To Utah Jazz----
- Jay Humphries
- Larry Krystkowiak
July 1, 1992
To Milwaukee Bucks----
- Alaa Abdelnaby
To San Antonio Spurs----
- Dale Ellis
To Portland Trail Blazers----
- Tracy Murray
August 4, 1992
To Milwaukee Bucks----
- Sam Vincent
To Orlando Magic----
- Lester Conner
December 4, 1992
To Milwaukee Bucks----
- Jon Barry
To Boston Celtics----
- Alaa Abdelnaby
February 25, 1993
To Milwaukee Bucks----
- Orlando Woolridge
To Detroit Pistons----
- Alvin Robertson

=== Free agents ===
Player	Signed	Former team
Anthony Pullard	August 31, 1992	Leuven
Alan Ogg	January 10, 1993	Miami Heat
Dan O'Sullivan	February 1, 1993	New Jersey Nets
Derek Strong	February 22, 1993	Washington Bullets

Player Transactions Citation:

== See also ==
- 1992-93 NBA season
