= 1992–93 San Antonio Spurs season =

- Head coach: Jerry Tarkanian (fired); Rex Hughes (interim); John Lucas II
- General manager: Bob Bass
- Owner: Red McCombs
- Arena: HemisFair Arena

Results
- Record: 49–33 (.598)
- Place: Division: 2nd (Midwest); Conference: 5th (Western)
- Playoff finish: Conference semifinals (lost to the Phoenix Suns 2-4)
- Stats at Basketball Reference

Local media
- Television: KABB; Home Sports Entertainment
- Radio: WOAI; KCOR (Spanish)

The 1992–93 San Antonio Spurs season was the 17th season for the San Antonio Spurs in the National Basketball Association, and their 26th season as a franchise.

== Season summary ==
=== Off-season ===
During the off-season, the Spurs acquired former All-Star guard Dale Ellis from the Milwaukee Bucks in a three-team trade, signed free agents Vinny Del Negro and undrafted rookie shooting guard Lloyd Daniels, and re-signed Avery Johnson after a brief stint with the Houston Rockets. The team also hired former University of Nevada, Las Vegas coach Jerry Tarkanian as their new head coach. However, prior to the start of the regular season, Terry Cummings suffered a serious knee injury during a pick-up game, and would only play in the final eight games of the season.

=== Regular season ===
Under Tarkanian and with the addition of Ellis, Johnson and Del Negro, the Spurs struggled with a 9–11 start to the regular season. After 20 games into the season, Tarkanian was fired as head coach, then after playing one game under assistant coach Rex Hughes, the team hired John Lucas II as their new coach. In December, the team traded Sidney Green to the Charlotte Hornets in exchange for J.R. Reid. Under Lucas, the Spurs played solid basketball posting a 10-game winning streak in January, and then posting an eight-game winning streak between January and February, as the team held a 34–15 record at the All-Star break. However, the Spurs played below .500 in winning percentage for the remainder of the season, finishing in second place in the Midwest Division with a 49–33 record, and earning the fifth seed in the Western Conference.

David Robinson averaged 23.4 points, 11.7 rebounds, 3.7 assists, 1.5 steals and 3.2 blocks per game, and was named to the All-NBA Third Team, and to the NBA All-Defensive First Team, while Sean Elliott averaged 17.2 points and 3.8 assists per game, and Ellis provided the team with 16.7 points per game, and also led them with 119 three-point field goals. In addition, Antoine Carr averaged 13.1 points and 5.5 rebounds per game, while Reid provided with 9.9 points and 5.8 rebounds per game in 66 games after the trade, Daniels contributed 9.1 points per game off the bench, Johnson contributed 8.7 points and 7.5 assists per game, and Del Negro averaged 7.4 points and 4.0 assists per game.

During the NBA All-Star weekend at the Delta Center in Salt Lake City, Utah, Robinson and Elliott were both selected for the 1993 NBA All-Star Game, as members of the Western Conference All-Star team; it was Elliott's first ever All-Star appearance. Robinson finished in sixth place in Most Valuable Player voting, and also finished tied in second place in Defensive Player of the Year voting, behind Hakeem Olajuwon of the Houston Rockets, while Lucas finished in sixth place in Coach of the Year voting.

The Spurs finished eleventh in the NBA in home-game attendance, with an attendance of 658,337 at the HemisFair Arena during the regular season.

=== NBA playoffs ===
In the Western Conference First Round of the 1993 NBA playoffs, the Spurs faced off against the 4th–seeded Portland Trail Blazers, who were led by the trio of All-Star guard Clyde Drexler, All-Star guard Terry Porter, and Sixth Man of the Year, Clifford Robinson. With the series tied at 1–1, the Spurs won the next two games over the Trail Blazers at home, which included a Game 4 win at the HemisFair Arena in overtime, 100–97 to win the series in four games.

In the Western Conference Semi-finals, the Spurs faced off against the top–seeded, and Pacific Division champion Phoenix Suns, who were led by the All-Star trio of Most Valuable Player of the Year, Charles Barkley, three-point specialist Dan Majerle, and Kevin Johnson. The Spurs lost the first two games to the Suns on the road at the America West Arena, but managed to win the next two games at the HemisFair Arena to even the series. However, the Spurs lost the next two games to the Suns, including a Game 6 loss at the HemisFair Arena, 102–100, in which Barkley hit a game-winning buzzer-beater, as the Spurs lost the series in six games.

The Suns would advance to the 1993 NBA Finals, but would lose to the 2-time defending NBA champion Chicago Bulls in six games.

=== Aftermath ===
This was also the Spurs' final season in which they played their home games at the HemisFair Arena. Following the season, Elliott was traded to the Detroit Pistons, and Johnson signed as a free agent with the Golden State Warriors.

== Draft picks ==
Round	Pick	Player	Position	Nationality	College
1	18	Tracy Murray	SF	United States	UCLA
2	44	Henry Williams	G	United States	UNC-Charlotte

== Roster ==
1992–93 San Antonio Spurs roster
Players

Pos.	No.	Player	Height	Weight	DOB	From
G	40	Willie Anderson	6 ft 7 in (2.01 m)	190 lb (86 kg)	1967–01–08	Georgia
F	35	Antoine Carr	6 ft 9 in (2.06 m)	225 lb (102 kg)	1961–07–23	Wichita State
F	34	Terry Cummings	6 ft 9 in (2.06 m)	220 lb (100 kg)	1961–03–15	DePaul
G	24	Lloyd Daniels	6 ft 7 in (2.01 m)	205 lb (93 kg)	1967–09–04	Mt. San Antonio
G	15	Vinny Del Negro	6 ft 4 in (1.93 m)	185 lb (84 kg)	1966–08–09	NC State
F	32	Sean Elliott	6 ft 8 in (2.03 m)	205 lb (93 kg)	1968–02–02	Arizona
G	3	Dale Ellis	6 ft 7 in (2.01 m)	205 lb (93 kg)	1960–08–06	Tennessee
G	6	Avery Johnson	5 ft 10 in (1.78 m)	175 lb (79 kg)	1965–03–25	Southern
G	5	Sam Mack	6 ft 7 in (2.01 m)	220 lb (100 kg)	1970–05–26	Houston
F	7	J. R. Reid	6 ft 9 in (2.06 m)	247 lb (112 kg)	1968–03–31	North Carolina
C	50	David Robinson	7 ft 1 in (2.16 m)	235 lb (107 kg)	1965–08–06	Navy
F	2	Larry Smith	6 ft 8 in (2.03 m)	215 lb (98 kg)	1958–01–18	Alcorn State
F	10	David Wood	6 ft 9 in (2.06 m)	227 lb (103 kg)	1964–10–30	Nevada

Coaches
Head coach
- John Lucas II
Assistant(s)
- Ron Adams
- George Gervin
- Rex Hughes
- Tom Thibodeau

Legend
- (DP) Unsigned draft pick
- (FA) Free agent
- (S) Suspended
- Injured

== Regular season ==
=== Season standings ===
Midwest Division	W	L	PCT	GB	Home	Road	Div
y-Houston Rockets	55	27	.671	—	31–10	24–17	19–7
x-San Antonio Spurs	49	33	.598	6	31–10	18–23	17–9
x-Utah Jazz	47	35	.573	8	28–13	19–22	16–10
Denver Nuggets	36	46	.439	19	28–13	8–33	13–13
Minnesota Timberwolves	19	63	.232	36	11–30	8–33	10–16
Dallas Mavericks	11	71	.134	44	7–34	4–37	3–23

y – clinched division title
x – clinched playoff spot

#	Western Conference				
#	Team	W	L	PCT	GB
1	z-Phoenix Suns	62	20	.756	–
2	y-Houston Rockets	55	27	.671	7
3	x-Seattle SuperSonics	55	27	.671	7
4	x-Portland Trail Blazers	51	31	.622	11
5	x-San Antonio Spurs	49	33	.598	13
6	x-Utah Jazz	47	35	.573	15
7	x-Los Angeles Clippers	41	41	.500	21
8	x-Los Angeles Lakers	39	43	.476	23
9	Denver Nuggets	36	46	.439	26
10	Golden State Warriors	34	48	.415	28
11	Sacramento Kings	25	57	.305	37
12	Minnesota Timberwolves	19	63	.232	43
13	Dallas Mavericks	11	71	.134	51

z – clinched division title
y – clinched division title
x – clinched playoff spot

=== Game log ===
1992–93 game log
Total: 49–33 (Home: 31–10; Road: 18–23)
November: 5–6 (home: 4–2; road: 1–4)

Game	Date	Team	Score	High points	High rebounds	High assists	Location Attendance	Record
1	November 6, 1992	@ Sacramento	L 106–114				ARCO Arena	0–1
2	November 7, 1992	@ Denver	L 121–125 (2OT)				McNichols Sports Arena	0–2
3	November 10, 1992	Milwaukee	W 104–98				HemisFair Arena	1–2
4	November 12, 1992	Atlanta	L 97–104				HemisFair Arena	1–3
5	November 14, 1992	Houston	L 87–93				HemisFair Arena	1–4
6	November 17, 1992	Cleveland	W 106–95				HemisFair Arena	2–4
7	November 19, 1992	Dallas	W 123–95				HemisFair Arena	3–4
8	November 21, 1992	@ Houston	L 100–103				The Summit	3–5
9	November 24, 1992	@ Portland	L 91–95				Memorial Coliseum	3–6
10	November 25, 1992	@ Utah	W 128–102				Delta Center	4–6
11	November 28, 1992	Seattle	W 104–97				HemisFair Arena	5–6

December: 9–6 (home: 4–2; road: 5–4)

Game	Date	Team	Score	High points	High rebounds	High assists	Location Attendance	Record
12	December 1, 1992	@ Washington	L 106–119				Capital Centre	5–7
13	December 2, 1992	@ Philadelphia	W 98–82				The Spectrum	6–7
14	December 4, 1992	@ New Jersey	L 103–108 (OT)				Brendan Byrne Arena	6–8
15	December 5, 1992	@ Atlanta	L 105–113				The Omni	6–9
16	December 8, 1992	Utah	W 121–103				HemisFair Arena	7–9
17	December 10, 1992	Miami	W 101–91				HemisFair Arena	8–9
18	December 12, 1992	@ Dallas	W 113–91				Reunion Arena	9–9
19	December 15, 1992	L.A. Lakers	L 101–107				HemisFair Arena	9–10
20	December 17, 1992	@ Houston	L 109–121				The Summit	9–11
21	December 18, 1992	Dallas	W 122–101				HemisFair Arena	10–11
22	December 22, 1992	Denver	W 113–108				HemisFair Arena	11–11
23	December 25, 1992	@ L.A. Clippers	W 103–94				Los Angeles Memorial Sports Arena	12–11
24	December 26, 1992	@ L.A. Lakers	W 104–92				Great Western Forum	13–11
25	December 28, 1992	Golden State	L 105–106				HemisFair Arena	14–11
26	December 30, 1992	@ Denver	W 114–94				McNichols Sports Arena	14–12

January: 12–2 (home: 8–0; road: 4–2)

Game	Date	Team	Score	High points	High rebounds	High assists	Location Attendance	Record
27	January 3, 1993; 7:00 p.m. CST	Phoenix	W 114–113 (OT)	Robinson (33)	Robinson (11)	Del Negro (9)	HemisFair Arena; 16,057	15–12
28	January 5, 1993	@ Utah	L 87–113				Delta Center	15–13
29	January 7, 1993	Utah	W 109–99				HemisFair Arena	16–13
30	January 9, 1993	Portland	W 109–93				HemisFair Arena	17–13
31	January 11, 1993	@ Detroit	W 109–91				The Palace of Auburn Hills	18–13
32	January 13, 1993	@ Minnesota	W 89–81				Target Center	19–13
33	January 14, 1993	@ Milwaukee	W 108–93				Bradley Center	20–13
34	January 16, 1993	Charlotte	W 124–111				HemisFair Arena	21–13
35	January 19, 1993	Denver	W 121–110				HemisFair Arena	22–13
36	January 22, 1993	Detroit	W 123–109				HemisFair Arena	23–13
37	January 24, 1993; 12 Noon CST	Chicago	W 103–99	Robinson (24)	Robinson (13)	Johnson (15)	HemisFair Arena; 16,057	24–13
38	January 27, 1993	@ Seattle	W 119–99				Seattle Center Coliseum	25–13
39	January 29, 1993; 8:30 p.m. CST	@ Phoenix	L 110–125	Elliott, Ellis (19)	Robinson (10)	Johnson (9)	America West Arena; 19,023	25–14
40	January 30, 1993	Sacramento	W 129–124				HemisFair Arena	26–14

February: 9–4 (home: 7–1; road: 2–3)

Game	Date	Team	Score	High points	High rebounds	High assists	Location Attendance	Record
41	February 2, 1993	New Jersey	W 111–93				HemisFair Arena	27–14
42	February 4, 1993	Indiana	W 133–115				HemisFair Arena	28–14
43	February 6, 1993	Minnesota	W 104–95				HemisFair Arena	29–14
44	February 9, 1993	L.A. Clippers	W 112–97				HemisFair Arena	30–14
45	February 11, 1993	Washington	W 105–95				HemisFair Arena	31–14
46	February 13, 1993	Boston	W 90–85				HemisFair Arena	32–14
47	February 15, 1993	@ L.A. Clippers	W 102–99				Los Angeles Memorial Sports Arena	33–14
48	February 16, 1993	@ Golden State	L 112–133				Oakland-Alameda County Coliseum Arena	33–15
49	February 18, 1993	Philadelphia	W 103–98				HemisFair Arena	34–15
All-Star Break
50	February 23, 1993; 8:30 p.m. CST	Phoenix	L 103–105	Robinson (35)	Robinson (11)	Johnson (12)	HemisFair Arena; 16,057	34–16
51	February 25, 1993	@ Charlotte	L 104–111				Charlotte Coliseum	34–17
52	February 26, 1993	@ Miami	L 86–93				Miami Arena	34–18
53	February 28, 1993	@ Orlando	W 94–90				Orlando Arena	35–17

March: 8–8 (home: 4–2; road: 4–6)

Game	Date	Team	Score	High points	High rebounds	High assists	Location Attendance	Record
54	March 2, 1993	@ Indiana	L 95–109				Market Square Arena	35–19
55	March 3, 1993	@ Boston	L 91–132				Boston Garden	35–20
56	March 5, 1993; 7:00 p.m. CST	@ Chicago	W 107–102 (OT)	Ellis (29)	Robinson (11)	Johnson (7)	Chicago Stadium; 18,676	36–20
57	March 6, 1993	@ Minnesota	L 105–106				Target Center	36–21
58	March 9, 1993	Dallas	W 119–84				HemisFair Arena	37–21
59	March 13, 1993	Portland	W 108–99				HemisFair Arena	38–21
60	March 15, 1993	L.A. Lakers	L 87–92				HemisFair Arena	38–22
61	March 17, 1993	@ L.A. Lakers	W 101–100				Great Western Forum	39–22
62	March 19, 1993	Orlando	W 96–93				HemisFair Arena	40–22
63	March 21, 1993	@ New York	L 96–115				Madison Square Garden	40–23
64	March 23, 1993	@ Cleveland	L 90–127				Richfield Coliseum	40–24
65	March 24, 1993	@ Minnesota	W 105–92				Target Center	41–24
66	March 26, 1993	Utah	L 98–104				HemisFair Arena	41–25
67	March 28, 1993	@ Dallas	W 114–107				Reunion Arena	42–25
68	March 30, 1993	Seattle	W 99–97				HemisFair Arena	43–25
69	March 31, 1993	@ Utah	L 85–93				Delta Center	43–26

April: 6–7 (home: 4–3; road: 2–4)

Game	Date	Team	Score	High points	High rebounds	High assists	Location Attendance	Record
70	April 2, 1993	Minnesota	W 108–101				HemisFair Arena	43–27
71	April 4, 1993	New York	L 103–108 (OT)				HemisFair Arena	44–27
72	April 6, 1993	Golden State	L 111–125				HemisFair Arena	44–28
73	April 8, 1993	L.A. Clippers	W 112–108				HemisFair Arena	45–28
74	April 10, 1993	@ Houston	L 88–98				The Summit	45–29
75	April 13, 1993	@ Sacramento	W 110–100				ARCO Arena	46–29
76	April 14, 1993	@ Golden State	W 96–93				Oakland-Alameda County Coliseum Arena	47–29
77	April 16, 1993	Sacramento	L 93–100				HemisFair Arena	47–30
78	April 18, 1993	@ Portland	L 101–105				Memorial Coliseum	47–31
79	April 19, 1993	@ Seattle	L 89–96				Seattle Center Coliseum	47–32
80	April 22, 1993	Denver	W 131–111				HemisFair Arena	48–32
81	April 24, 1993; 2:30 p.m. CST	@ Phoenix	L 97–99	Ellis, Robinson (20)	Robinson (19)	Johnson (9)	America West Arena; 19,023	48–33
82	April 25, 1993	Houston	W 119–117 (OT)				HemisFair Arena	49–33

1992–93 schedule

== Playoffs ==
1993 playoff game log
First Round: 3–1 (home: 2–0; road: 1–1)

Game	Date	Team	Score	High points	High rebounds	High assists	Location Attendance	Series
1	April 29, 1993	@ Portland	W 87–86	Sean Elliott (18)	David Robinson (15)	Elliott, Johnson (7)	Memorial Coliseum; 12,888	1–0
2	May 1, 1993	@ Portland	L 96–105	Robinson, Cummings (15)	David Robinson (14)	Avery Johnson (6)	Memorial Coliseum; 12,888	1–1
3	May 5, 1993	Portland	W 107–101	David Robinson (26)	David Robinson (14)	Avery Johnson (6)	HemisFair Arena; 16,057	2–1
4	May 7, 1993	Portland	W 100–97 (OT)	Dale Ellis (21)	David Robinson (17)	David Robinson (11)	HemisFair Arena; 16,057	3–1

Western Conference Semifinals: 2–4 (home: 2–1; road: 0–3)

Game	Date	Team	Score	High points	High rebounds	High assists	Location Attendance	Series
1	May 11, 1993; 9:30 p.m. CST	@ Phoenix	L 89–98	Robinson (32)	Robinson (10)	Del Negro (6)	America West Arena; 19,023	0–1
2	May 13, 1993; 9:30 p.m. CST	@ Phoenix	L 103–109	Robinson (27)	Robinson (10)	Del Negro, Elliott, Johnson (6)	America West Arena; 19,023	0–2
3	May 15, 1993; 12 p.m. CST	Phoenix	W 111–96	Carr (21)	Johnson, Robinson (8)	Johnson (15)	HemisFair Arena; 16,057	1–2
4	May 16, 1993; 2:30 p.m. CST	Phoenix	W 117–103	Robinson (36)	Robinson (16)	Johnson (12)	HemisFair Arena; 16,057	2–2
5	May 18, 1993; 9:30 p.m. CST	@ Phoenix	L 97–109	Robinson (24)	Robinson (8)	Johnson (15)	America West Arena; 19,023	2–3
6	May 20, 1993; 6:00 p.m. CST	Phoenix	L 100–102	Robinson (22)	Robinson (14)	Johnson (10)	HemisFair Arena; 16,057	2–4

1993 schedule

== Player statistics ==
=== Ragular season ===
Player	POS	GP	GS	MP	REB	AST	STL	BLK	PTS	MPG	RPG	APG	SPG	BPG	PPG
David Robinson	C	82	82	3,211	956	301	127	264	1,916	39.2	11.7	3.7	1.5	3.2	23.4
Dale Ellis	SG	82	76	2,731	312	107	78	18	1,366	33.3	3.8	1.3	1.0	.2	16.7
Lloyd Daniels	SG	77	10	1,573	216	148	38	30	701	20.4	2.8	1.9	.5	.4	9.1
Avery Johnson	PG	75	49	2,030	146	561	85	16	656	27.1	1.9	7.5	1.1	.2	8.7
Vinny Del Negro	PG	73	31	1,526	163	291	44	1	543	20.9	2.2	4.0	.6	.0	7.4
Antoine Carr	PF	71	46	1,947	388	97	35	87	932	27.4	5.5	1.4	.5	1.2	13.1
Sean Elliott	SF	70	70	2,604	322	265	68	28	1,207	37.2	4.6	3.8	1.0	.4	17.2
J. R. Reid^{†}	PF	66	24	1,592	386	56	36	26	653	24.1	5.8	.8	.5	.4	9.9
Larry Smith	PF	66	13	833	268	28	23	16	85	12.6	4.1	.4	.3	.2	1.3
David Wood	PF	64	2	598	97	34	13	12	155	9.3	1.5	.5	.2	.2	2.4
Sam Mack	SF	40	0	267	48	15	14	5	142	6.7	1.2	.4	.4	.1	3.6
Willie Anderson	SG	38	7	560	57	79	14	6	183	14.7	1.5	2.1	.4	.2	4.8
William Bedford	C	16	0	66	10	0	0	1	25	4.1	.6	.0	.0	.1	1.6
Sidney Green^{†}	PF	15	0	202	71	19	5	3	53	13.5	4.7	1.3	.3	.2	3.5
Terry Cummings	PF	8	0	76	19	4	1	1	27	9.5	2.4	.5	.1	.1	3.4
Matt Othick	PG	4	0	39	2	7	1	0	8	9.8	.5	1.8	.3	.0	2.0

- ^{†} Denotes player spent time with another team in the season. Stats reflect time with the Spurs only.

=== Playoffs ===
Player	POS	GP	GS	MP	REB	AST	STL	BLK	PTS	MPG	RPG	APG	SPG	BPG	PPG
David Robinson	C	10	10	421	126	40	10	36	231	42.1	12.6	4.0	1.0	3.6	23.1
Sean Elliott	SF	10	10	381	48	36	8	3	158	38.1	4.8	3.6	.8	.3	15.8
Avery Johnson	PG	10	10	314	31	81	10	1	82	31.4	3.1	8.1	1.0	.1	8.2
Dale Ellis	SG	10	10	305	35	11	4	0	125	30.5	3.5	1.1	.4	.0	12.5
J. R. Reid	PF	10	2	220	50	15	8	8	85	22.0	5.0	1.5	.8	.8	8.5
Willie Anderson	SG	10	0	219	23	28	9	2	95	21.9	2.3	2.8	.9	.2	9.5
Terry Cummings	PF	10	0	138	39	5	3	1	67	13.8	3.9	.5	.3	.1	6.7
Antoine Carr	PF	8	8	171	38	9	3	9	84	21.4	4.8	1.1	.4	1.1	10.5
Vinny Del Negro	PG	8	0	112	19	24	1	1	40	14.0	2.4	3.0	.1	.1	5.0
Lloyd Daniels	SG	8	0	74	15	2	3	0	28	9.3	1.9	.3	.4	.0	3.5
Larry Smith	PF	6	0	50	16	1	4	2	7	8.3	2.7	.2	.7	.3	1.2
David Wood	PF	5	0	20	3	1	0	0	5	4.0	.6	.2	.0	.0	1.0

== Awards and records ==
- David Robinson, NBA All-Star
- David Robinson, All-NBA Third Team
- David Robinson, NBA All-Defensive Second Team
- Sean Elliott, NBA All-Star

== See also ==
- 1992–93 NBA season
