= Tate George =

American basketball player (born 1968)

Personal information
- Born: May 29, 1968 (age 58) Newark, New Jersey, U.S.
- Listed height: 6 ft 5 in (1.96 m)
- Listed weight: 190 lb (86 kg)

Career information
- High school: Union Catholic Regional (Scotch Plains, New Jersey)
- College: UConn (1986–1990)
- NBA draft: 1990: 1st round, 22nd overall pick
- Drafted by: New Jersey Nets
- Playing career: 1990–1997
- Position: Point guard
- Number: 12

Career history
- 1990–1993: New Jersey Nets
- 1993–1995: Quad City Thunder
- 1995: Milwaukee Bucks
- 1995: Quad City Thunder
- 1995–1996: Connecticut Pride
- 1996–1997: Rockford Lightning
- 1997: Fort Wayne Fury

Career highlights
- CBA champion (1994); Third-team All-Big East (1990)

Career NBA statistics
- Points: 736 (4.2 ppg)
- Rebounds: 180 (1.0 rpg)
- Assists: 325 (1.8 apg)
- Stats at NBA.com
- Stats at Basketball Reference

Tate Claude George (born May 29, 1968) is an American former professional basketball player who was selected by the New Jersey Nets with the 22nd overall pick in the 1990 NBA draft from the University of Connecticut. A 6-foot-5-inch (1.96 m) and 190-pound (86 kg) guard, he played a total of four years in the NBA for the Nets and Milwaukee Bucks, averaging 4.2 points per game in his career.

== College career and prior NBA ==
George is best remembered for his miraculous buzzer-beating shot to defeat Clemson in the Sweet Sixteen of the 1990 NCAA Tournament. With only one second left in the game and UConn down by 1 point, Scott Burrell threw a full court pass to George. George caught the pass, spun around and released a 15-footer with 1 second on the clock. The shot fell through as time expired, and UConn won the game.

George was a member of the CBA-champion Quad City Thunder in 1993–94, with George averaging 16.4 per game. The Thunder defeated the Omaha Racers 4–1 in the finals, winning last three on road to claim the title. The Thunder won the opener in double overtime after George tied the game with last-second buckets at both the end of regulation and of the first overtime. The Thunder then lost the second game in triple overtime, but won three straight in Omaha, the last in OT.

== NBA career statistics ==
Legend
GP	Games played	GS	Games started	MPG	Minutes per game
FG%	Field goal percentage	3P%	3-point field goal percentage	FT%	Free throw percentage
RPG	Rebounds per game	APG	Assists per game	SPG	Steals per game
BPG	Blocks per game	PPG	Points per game	**Bold**	Career high

=== Regular season ===
Year	Team	GP	GS	MPG	FG%	3P%	FT%	RPG	APG	SPG	BPG	PPG
1990–91	New Jersey	56	**11**	10.6	.415	.000	.800	0.8	1.9	0.4	**0.1**	3.4
1991–92	New Jersey	**70**	2	**14.8**	**.427**	**.167**	.821	**1.5**	**2.3**	**0.6**	0.0	**6.0**
1992–93	New Jersey	48	1	7.9	.378	.000	.833	0.6	1.2	0.2	**0.1**	2.5
1994–95	Milwaukee	3	0	2.7	.333	.000	**1.000**	0.3	0.0	0.0	0.0	1.3
Career		177	14	11.4	.414	.071	.820	1.0	1.8	0.4	0.1	4.2

=== Playoffs ===
Year	Team	GP	GS	MPG	FG%	3P%	FT%	RPG	APG	SPG	BPG	PPG
1991–92	New Jersey	**4**	0	**11.0**	**.304**	.000	**.333**	0.0	2.0	**0.8**	**0.3**	**3.8**
1992–93	New Jersey	2	0	**11.0**	.286	.000	.000	**1.5**	**3.0**	0.5	0.0	2.0
Career		6	0	11.0	.300	.000	.333	0.5	2.3	0.7	0.2	3.2

== Ponzi scheme ==
George founded The George Group, a real estate development firm based in West Orange, New Jersey.

On September 23, 2011, George surrendered to authorities on fraud charges related to his alleged operation of a Ponzi scheme while CEO of The George Group.

On September 30, 2013, George was found guilty on four counts of federal wire fraud. Each count carries a penalty of up to 20 years in prison and a $250,000 fine. His bail was immediately revoked, and was scheduled to be sentenced January 16, 2014. On January 21, 2016, in New Jersey federal court, George was sentenced to nine years in prison for his involvement in the aforementioned Ponzi scheme. Upon his release he is ordered to pay $2.5 million in restitution. He will also be on three years of supervised release after serving his sentence.

In September 2020, the United States Court of Appeals for the Third Circuit affirmed a 2019 Tax Court decision that George was liable for unpaid taxes on his NBA pension payment for 2013. George had argued that his incarceration should excuse his failure to file a return or to pay tax beyond the amount withheld from his pension payment. He was released from prison in 2021.
