= Dwayne Schintzius =

American basketball player (1968–2012)

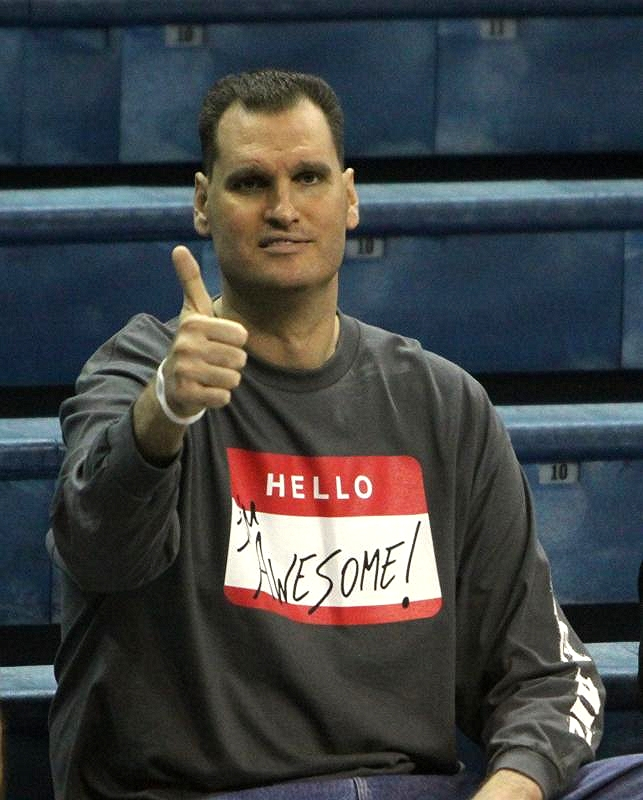
- Schintzius in attendance at a Florida basketball game in February 2011

Personal information
- Born: October 14, 1968 Brandon, Florida, U.S.
- Died: April 15, 2012 (aged 43) Tampa, Florida, U.S.
- Listed height: 7 ft 2 in (2.18 m)
- Listed weight: 260 lb (118 kg)

Career information
- High school: Brandon (Brandon, Florida)
- College: Florida (1986–1990)
- NBA draft: 1990: 1st round, 24th overall pick
- Drafted by: San Antonio Spurs
- Playing career: 1990–2003
- Position: Center
- Number: 24, 42, 33, 55

Career history
- 1990–1991: San Antonio Spurs
- 1991–1992: Sacramento Kings
- 1992–1995: New Jersey Nets
- 1995–1996: Indiana Pacers
- 1996–1997: Los Angeles Clippers
- 1999: Boston Celtics
- 2001–2002: Mobile Revelers
- 2003: Brevard Blue Ducks

Career highlights
- First-team All-SEC (1989); Fourth-team Parade All-American (1986); McDonald's All-American (1986)

Career NBA statistics
- Points: 587 (2.7 ppg)
- Rebounds: 536 (2.5 rpg)
- Assists: 93 (0.4 apg)
- Stats at NBA.com
- Stats at Basketball Reference
Medals
Men's basketball
Representing United States
FIBA U19 World Championship
Silver medal – second place	1987 Bormio	National team

Dwayne Kenneth Schintzius (October 14, 1968 – April 15, 2012) was an American basketball player who played eight seasons in the National Basketball Association (NBA). He was born in Brandon, Florida and attended the University of Florida, where he helped lead the Florida Gators men's basketball program to its first three NCAA tournament appearances as an all-conference center. Schintzius was selected in the first round of the 1990 NBA draft (24th overall pick) by the San Antonio Spurs, but chronic back problems reduced his effectiveness, and he played for six different NBA teams over ten seasons in the league, mainly as a reserve player.

Off the court, Schintzius was known for his distinctive mullet-style haircut that he called "the lobster", his sometimes abrasive behavior, and his performance as a Russian basketball player in the 1996 comedy film Eddie. In 2009, he was diagnosed with a rare form of leukemia. After treatment and a brief remission, he died from complications of the disease in 2012.

== Early years ==
Schintzius was born in Brandon, Florida, a suburb of Tampa. He attended Brandon High School, and played as a center for the Brandon Eagles high school basketball team. Together with teammate Toney Mack, Schintzius led the Eagles to a Class 4A state runner-up finish as a sophomore, and another Final Four berth as a junior. As a senior, he averaged 21.1 points and 17 rebounds per game, was a finalist for Florida's Mr. Basketball award, and was recognized as a high school All-American by McDonald's and Parade magazine in 1986.

== College career ==
Schintzius received athletic scholarship offers from many top college programs. Unlike most top Florida high school basketball prospects up to that point, he chose to stay in-state and attend the University of Florida, where he played for the Florida Gators men's basketball team from 1987 to 1990 under head coach Norm Sloan. Schintzius started at center for the Gators beginning early in his freshman season. By the end of his junior season (1988–89), he had led the Gators in scoring, rebounding, and free-throw percentage over at least one full season. He also set the program's record for blocked shots, and at the end of his junior year, his season blocked shot totals ranked first, second, and third in school history.

The Gators had never been invited to the NCAA basketball tournament in over seven decades of basketball. However, they made the field during each of Schintzius's three full seasons with the program and advanced to the Sweet Sixteen in 1987. During his junior year, the Gators won their first-ever regular season Southeastern Conference (SEC) championship. Schintzius was recognized as a first-team All-SEC player after that season and was included on multiple All-American lists.

However, Schintzius' college career was marred by disciplinary problems. He occasionally clashed with Coach Sloan, including one instance in which he refused to re-enter a game with a minute left during his sophomore season. He also had minor incidents with opposing players, fans, and mascots, and with others off the court.

During his junior season, Schintzius allegedly heard a rude remark from a sidewalk while riding in a car outside a Gainesville nightclub and stormed after the offender wielding a tennis racket. Schintzius later apologized and was not charged with a crime, but the university's office of student affairs found him guilty of violating the student code of conduct and suspended him for four games.

After returning from that suspension, fans in opposing arenas occasionally threw tennis balls onto the court, presumably taunting Schintzius for the incident. In January 1989, Florida traveled to Nashville to face the Vanderbilt Commodores in a crucial SEC matchup. Losing 72–70, Florida turned the ball over with only one second left on the clock, seemingly sealing a loss. But at that point, someone in the Memorial Gymnasium home crowd threw a tennis ball onto the court. Referee John Clougherty immediately called a technical foul on the Commodores, and Schintzius, who led the Gators in free throw percentage that season, hit both free throws to send the game into overtime. He then scored the Gators' first seven points in the extra period and Florida won the game 81–78. Florida went on to capture the program's first SEC regular season championship, beating Vanderbilt by a single game.

Sloan was forced to resign before Schintzius's senior season of 1989–90 and was replaced on an interim basis by former Tennessee coach Don DeVoe. Schintzius was not happy with this turn of events and skipped DeVoe's first practice with the team along with fellow star Livingston Chatman. Soon after, he was suspended for alleged involvement in a fraternity house fight. DeVoe told Schintzius that in order to rejoin the basketball team, he would have to improve his off-court behavior, maintain his playing weight (he weighed almost 300 pounds at one point), go to class consistently, and get rid of his distinct mullet-style haircut, known as the "lobster.". In a statement released January 25, 1990, Schintzius claimed that he had done all these things, but was nonetheless quitting the team due to conflicts with his new coach. The statement read, in part:

No one can argue that Coach Sloan and Coach Towe (Monte Towe, Sloan's assistant) were easy to play for, and to them you had to accept the coach as the absolute authority and their word as final; but that does not mean I must sail under the authority of Captain Ahab. If you can play for Coach Sloan, you can play for almost anyone, almost anyone.

Without Schintzius, the Gators lost sixteen of the seventeen games to end the season and missed the NCAA tournament for the first time since the year before his arrival.

Schintzius remains the only player in SEC history to amass more than 1,000 points, 800 rebounds, 250 assists and 250 blocks. He still holds Florida's career record for blocked shots (272), and ranks sixth among the program's all-time scoring leaders with 1,624 points.

== Professional career ==
Despite his personal issues, Schintzius was regarded as a good pro prospect due to his size and skills, with some experts opining that he was the most talented center in his draft class and some mock drafts projecting him as a top-5 pick. He remained on the board until later in the first round of the 1990 NBA draft, however, and the San Antonio Spurs selected him with the 24th overall pick.

Schintzius held out before his rookie campaign, then appeared in 42 games and averaged 3.8 points per game for the Spurs during the 1990–91 NBA season while backing up star center David Robinson. His playing time was limited by a bad back, a chronic issue which would plague him throughout his career.

Schintzius also clashed with team officials during his time in San Antonio. Head coach Larry Brown criticized his work habits, and he had continuing conflict with general manager Bob Bass after difficult contract negotiations. Schintzius reported overweight to training camp before his second season, prompting Bass to tell him to "at least" cut his "lobster" hairdo. Schintzius got a haircut as directed, then sent Bass the shavings in an envelope. Three days later on September 23, 1991, Bass traded him to the Sacramento Kings for Antoine Carr and a second-round draft pick. Schintzius' playing time was again limited by injury in Sacramento, and the club did not re-sign him after the season.

Schintzius signed with the New Jersey Nets in October 1992, and remained with the team for three seasons, playing in a career high 43 contests during the 1994-95 season. He spent a year with the Indiana Pacers in 1995–96, and a year with the Los Angeles Clippers in 1996–97. Schintzius only played 15 games with the Clippers but did post a career-high 15 points in a loss against the Bullets on January 10, 1997. This game also featured the only three point make of Schintzius' NBA career. After missing the entire 1997–98 season due to injury, he played 16 games with the Boston Celtics in 1998–99 before retiring from the NBA.

His NBA career was severely hampered by injuries, particularly chronic back problems. He had several surgeries for a spinal disc herniation and often missed long stretches of playing time as he moved from team to team, mostly serving as a reserve center. In eight NBA seasons, he appeared in 217 regular season games and started 33 of them.

Schintzius later came out of retirement to play in the minor leagues with the Mobile Revelers of the NBA's Development League in 2001–02, and the Brevard Blue Ducks of the United States Basketball League (USBL) in 2003.

== Off the court ==
Schintzius played Ivan Radovadovitch, a fictional Georgian player for the New York Knicks, in the 1996 comedy movie Eddie, which starred Whoopi Goldberg as the team's female coach. Several other actual NBA players were also featured as members of the Knicks and other real NBA teams in the film. He later appeared in local commercials.

At the trial of his former New Jersey Nets teammate Jayson Williams, he testified that he witnessed Williams kill his own dog with a shotgun.

== Illness and death ==
In November 2009, Schintzius was diagnosed with a chronic myelomonocytic leukemia, a rare and often fatal form of the disease. With a bone marrow donation from his brother Travis, he underwent bone marrow transplantation at the Moffit Cancer Center in Tampa on January 12, 2010. The procedure was considered a success, but Schintzius struggled through several difficult rounds of chemotherapy until being declared cancer-free in July 2010.

In early 2012, the cancer and related complications returned, and a second bone marrow transplant was required. On April 15, 2012, Schintzius died at the Moffit Cancer Center from respiratory failure; he was 43 years old.

== Career statistics ==
Legend
GP	Games played	GS	Games started	MPG	Minutes per game
FG%	Field goal percentage	3P%	3-point field goal percentage	FT%	Free throw percentage
RPG	Rebounds per game	APG	Assists per game	SPG	Steals per game
BPG	Blocks per game	PPG	Points per game	**Bold**	Career high

=== Regular season ===
Year	Team	GP	GS	MPG	FG%	3P%	FT%	RPG	APG	SPG	BPG	PPG
1990–91	San Antonio	42	7	9.5	.439	.000	.550	2.9	.4	.0	.7	**3.8**
1991–92	Sacramento	33	0	**12.1**	.427	.000	.833	**3.6**	**.6**	.2	**.8**	3.3
1992–93	New Jersey	5	0	7.0	.286	—	**1.000**	1.6	.4	**.4**	.4	1.4
1993–94	New Jersey	30	3	10.6	.345	—	.588	3.0	.4	.2	.6	2.3
1994–95	New Jersey	**43**	**11**	7.4	.380	—	.545	1.9	.3	.1	.4	2.0
1995–96	Indiana	33	5	9.0	**.445**	—	.619	2.4	.4	.3	.4	3.4
1996–97	L.A. Clippers	15	0	7.7	.361	**.500**	.875	1.5	.3	.1	.6	2.3
1998–99	Boston	16	0	4.2	.250	—	.750	1.2	.5	.0	.2	.7
Career		217	33	9.0	.404	.125	.638	2.5	.4	.1	.5	2.7

=== Playoffs ===
Year	Team	GP	GS	MPG	FG%	3P%	FT%	RPG	APG	SPG	BPG	PPG
1993	New Jersey	5	0	21.2	.448	—	.500	5.0	.8	.2	1.2	5.8

== See also ==
- List of Florida Gators in the NBA
