= Gerald Wilkins =

American basketball player (born 1963)

Personal information
- Born: September 11, 1963 (age 63) Atlanta, Georgia, U.S.
- Listed height: 6 ft 6 in (1.98 m)
- Listed weight: 185 lb (84 kg)

Career information
- High school: Benjamin Elijah Mays (Atlanta, Georgia)
- College: Moberly Area CC (1981–1982); Chattanooga (1982–1985)
- NBA draft: 1985: 2nd round, 47th overall pick
- Drafted by: New York Knicks
- Playing career: 1985–1999
- Position: Shooting guard / small forward
- Number: 21, 9

Career history
- 1985–1992: New York Knicks
- 1992–1994: Cleveland Cavaliers
- 1995–1996: Vancouver Grizzlies
- 1996–1999: Orlando Magic

Career highlights
- First-team All-SoCon (1985); Second-team All-SoCon (1984)

Career NBA statistics
- Points: 11,736 (13.0 ppg)
- Rebounds: 2,646 (2.9 rpg)
- Assists: 2,697 (3.0 apg)
- Stats at NBA.com
- Stats at Basketball Reference

Gerald Bernard Wilkins (born September 11, 1963) is an American former professional basketball player. He is a 6-foot-6-inch (1.98 m) shooting guard/small forward, who played collegiately at Moberly Area Community College and the University of Tennessee at Chattanooga before a career in the NBA.

== Biography ==
Wilkins is the younger brother of former Atlanta Hawks superstar Dominique Wilkins, father of guard/forward Damien Wilkins and Miss Georgia USA 2012 and Miss USA 2012 4th runner-up Jasmyn Wilkins as well as uncle to Dominique's son Jacob Wilkins. He was a key player on the New York Knicks team of the late 1980s, consistently being the second-leading scorer after Patrick Ewing. He was selected in the 1985 NBA draft and was once named Player of the Week (3/3/1991). Wilkins followed in his brother's footsteps, participating in the 1986 and 1987 NBA Slam Dunk Contest, where he finished 4th and tied for 7th out of 8, respectively.

Though initially a starter on the Knicks, his role decreased with the arrival of shooting guard John Starks in 1990 and small forward Xavier McDaniel in 1992. He became a free agent after the 1992 season and signed with the Cleveland Cavaliers, which had a core of Mark Price, Larry Nance, and Brad Daugherty. The Cavaliers hoped that Wilkins would be the final piece of the puzzle in order to finally defeat Michael Jordan and the Chicago Bulls. However, the Cavaliers were swept by the Bulls in the 1993 NBA Playoffs. He remained with the Cavaliers for a few more years, but languished due to injuries, especially during 1994–95 when he was out of action the entire season.

In 1995, Wilkins was picked up by the Vancouver Grizzlies in the expansion draft, but was unable to help out the team due to injury and lack of use, playing in only 28 of 82 games. He signed as a free agent with the Orlando Magic in 1996 and became their sixth man. The Magic signed him up again for 1997–98 with a $300,000 contract. In 1999, he signed a three-year contract worth $7 million. It was in his final season with the Magic that Gerald got to play with his older brother Dominique Wilkins, although both were in the twilight of their careers and thus used sparingly.

He was arrested in 2020 on assault charges.

== Career statistics ==
Legend
GP	Games played	GS	Games started	MPG	Minutes per game
FG%	Field goal percentage	3P%	3-point field goal percentage	FT%	Free throw percentage
RPG	Rebounds per game	APG	Assists per game	SPG	Steals per game
BPG	Blocks per game	PPG	Points per game	**Bold**	Career high
*	Led the league

=== NBA ===
==== Regular season ====
Year	Team	GP	GS	MPG	FG%	3P%	FT%	RPG	APG	SPG	BPG	PPG
1985–86	New York	81	53	25.0	.468	.250	.557	2.6	2.0	.8	.1	12.5
1986–87	New York	80	73	**34.5**	**.486**	.351	.701	3.7	**4.4**	1.1	.2	**19.1**
1987–88	New York	81	78	33.4	.446	.302	.786	3.3	4.0	1.1	.3	17.4
1988–89	New York	81	58	29.8	.451	.297	.756	3.0	3.4	**1.4**	.3	14.3
1989–90	New York	**82***	80	31.8	.457	.312	.803	**4.5**	4.0	1.2	.3	14.5
1990–91	New York	68	56	31.8	.473	.209	.820	3.0	4.0	1.2	.3	13.8
1991–92	New York	**82**	**82***	28.6	.447	.352	.730	2.5	2.7	.9	.2	12.4
1992–93	Cleveland	80	35	26.0	.453	.276	.840	2.7	2.3	1.0	.2	11.1
1993–94	Cleveland	**82***	**82***	33.8	.457	**.396**	.776	3.7	3.1	1.3	**.5**	14.3
1995–96	Vancouver	28	14	26.4	.376	.219	.870	2.3	2.4	.8	.1	6.7
1996–97	Orlando	80	26	27.5	.426	.325	.716	2.2	2.2	.7	.2	10.6
1997–98	Orlando	72	16	17.4	.325	.266	.704	1.3	1.1	.5	.1	5.3
1998–99	Orlando	3	0	9.3	.000	–	**1.000**	.3	.3	.0	.0	.7
Career		900	653	29.0	.450	.316	.745	2.9	3.0	1.0	.2	13.0

==== Playoffs ====
Year	Team	GP	GS	MPG	FG%	3P%	FT%	RPG	APG	SPG	BPG	PPG
1988	New York	4	4	37.3	.478	**.500**	.857	2.0	4.8	1.0	.0	20.0
1989	New York	9	9	32.2	**.481**	.100	.783	3.7	4.7	1.3	.3	16.1
1990	New York	10	10	31.9	.460	.250	.818	3.6	**5.2**	1.4	.1	14.6
1991	New York	3	1	26.0	.368	.286	**1.000**	2.7	1.7	**1.7**	.3	10.7
1992	New York	**12**	**12**	28.7	.413	.077	.696	2.5	2.8	.4	.1	8.9
1993	Cleveland	9	2	26.2	.437	.333	.765	1.8	2.7	1.0	.2	10.3
1994	Cleveland	3	3	**42.0**	.444	.438	.875	**4.3**	3.3	1.0	.0	**20.3**
1997	Orlando	5	0	28.8	.356	.333	.857	1.8	.8	.0	.4	9.4
Career		55	41	30.7	.442	.278	.802	2.8	3.5	.9	.2	12.9
