= Chris Morris (basketball) =

American basketball player (born 1966)

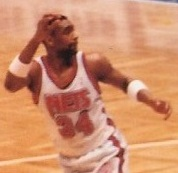
- Morris with the New Jersey Nets in 1991

Personal information
- Born: January 20, 1966 (age 60) Atlanta, Georgia, U.S.
- Listed height: 6 ft 8 in (2.03 m)
- Listed weight: 210 lb (95 kg)

Career information
- High school: Frederick Douglass (Atlanta, Georgia)
- College: Auburn (1984–1988)
- NBA draft: 1988: 1st round, 4th overall pick
- Drafted by: New Jersey Nets
- Playing career: 1988–2004
- Position: Small forward
- Number: 34, 43

Career history
- 1988–1995: New Jersey Nets
- 1995–1998: Utah Jazz
- 1999: Phoenix Suns
- 1999: Olympiacos B.C.
- 2001: Harlem Globetrotters
- 2002: Southern California Surf
- 2002: Purefoods Tender Juicy Hotdogs
- 2003–2004: Gaiteros del Zulia

Career highlights
- NBA All-Rookie Second Team (1989); 2× First-team All-SEC (1987, 1988); Mr. Georgia Basketball (1983)

Career NBA statistics
- Points: 8,184 (11.0 ppg)
- Rebounds: 3,544 (4.7 rpg)
- Assists: 1,182 (1.6 apg)
- Stats at NBA.com
- Stats at Basketball Reference

Christopher Vernard Morris (born January 20, 1966) is an American former professional basketball player. In his eleven-season (1988–1999) National Basketball Association (NBA) career, the 6'8" small forward played for the New Jersey Nets, Utah Jazz, and Phoenix Suns. He is a graduate of Atlanta's Douglass High School where his jersey has been retired, and played collegiately for the Auburn Tigers. He scored 8,184 total points in his NBA career.

== Early life ==
Born in Dawson, Georgia, Morris grew up with his mother and stepfather. His parents divorced, and Morris would often work at his grandmother's farm. Morris graduated from Frederick Douglass High School at Atlanta in 1984 where he led the basketball team to the school's only state championship. Morris was named Mr. Basketball for the state of Georgia and Douglass High School retired his jersey number 34 in 1994.

== College career ==
Morris played basketball at Auburn University from 1984 to 1988. Auburn won the SEC men's basketball tournament in 1985. In 1987 and 1988, Morris was a first-team all-SEC pick.

== Professional career ==
=== NBA ===
Morris was drafted with the 4th overall pick in 1988 NBA draft. He appeared in the 1989 NBA Slam Dunk Contest, finishing 8th place out of 8 contestants. The following season, Morris started what would be a career-high 76 games while averaging a career-high 14.8 points per game.

Morris developed a reputation as a malcontent and "coach killer." While a member of the Nets, he stopped listening to coach Bill Fitch and refused to enter a game while the team was trying to make the playoffs. When he later joined the Jazz, he and coach Jerry Sloan almost came to blows during practice, and he had to be escorted out of the building by security.

On March 2, 1993, with the New Jersey Nets, he shattered a backboard with a slam dunk during a regular season game against the Chicago Bulls.

With the Utah Jazz, Morris played in the 1997 and 1998 NBA Finals.

Following the 1998–99 NBA lockout, Morris signed with the Phoenix Suns in February 1999.

=== International ===
Morris played internationally after 11 seasons with the NBA, starting with Olympiacos B.C. of the Greek Basket League in 1999. However, Olympiacos cut Morris due to a knee injury. Morris joined the Harlem Globetrotters in 2001, and the Southern California Surf of the ABA signed Morris as a power forward in April 2002, and Morris later debuted with Purefoods Tender Juicy Hotdogs of the Philippine Basketball Association in July 2002. Morris played with Gaiteros del Zulia of the Venezuelan LPB in the 2003–2004 season.

== Lawsuit against Olympiacos ==
In 2004, Morris won a lawsuit against Olympiacos seeking $1.3 million in owed salary and $400,000 in court costs. US federal judge Christopher A. Boyko permitted American creditors to collect the money in 2009 shortly before Olympiacos visited the Cleveland Cavaliers for an exhibition match.

== Career statistics ==
Legend
GP	Games played	GS	Games started	MPG	Minutes per game
FG%	Field goal percentage	3P%	3-point field goal percentage	FT%	Free throw percentage
RPG	Rebounds per game	APG	Assists per game	SPG	Steals per game
BPG	Blocks per game	PPG	Points per game	**Bold**	Career high
*	Led the league

=== NBA ===
==== Regular season ====
Year	Team	GP	GS	MPG	FG%	3P%	FT%	RPG	APG	SPG	BPG	PPG
1988–89	New Jersey	76	48	27.6	.457	**.366**	.717	5.2	1.6	1.3	.8	14.1
1989–90	New Jersey	**80**	**76**	30.6	.422	.316	.722	5.3	1.8	1.6	1.0	**14.8**
1990–91	New Jersey	79	68	**32.3**	.425	.251	.734	**6.6**	**2.8**	1.7	**1.2**	13.2
1991–92	New Jersey	77	74	31.1	.477	.200	.714	6.4	2.6	1.7	1.1	11.4
1992–93	New Jersey	77	57	29.9	**.481**	.224	.794	5.9	1.4	**1.9**	.7	14.1
1993–94	New Jersey	50	27	27.0	.447	.361	.720	4.6	1.7	1.1	1.0	10.9
1994–95	New Jersey	71	49	30.0	.410	.334	.728	5.7	2.1	1.2	.7	13.4
1995–96	Utah	66	33	21.6	.437	.320	.772	3.5	1.2	1.0	.3	10.5
1996–97	Utah	73	1	13.4	.408	.274	.722	2.2	.6	.4	.3	4.3
1997–98	Utah	54	1	10.0	.411	.306	.721	2.1	.4	.5	.3	4.3
1998–99	Phoenix	44	2	12.2	.430	.286	**.870**	2.8	.5	.4	.3	4.2
Career		747	436	25.1	.441	.306	.739	4.7	1.6	1.2	.7	11.0

==== Playoffs ====
Year	Team	GP	GS	MPG	FG%	3P%	FT%	RPG	APG	SPG	BPG	PPG
1992	New Jersey	4	4	**33.8**	.552	.400	.778	5.0	1.3	**1.8**	**1.8**	**18.8**
1993	New Jersey	5	4	32.6	.557	.375	.917	**6.4**	1.4	1.6	1.2	17.0
1994	New Jersey	4	3	24.5	.279	.150	**1.000**	5.5	**1.8**	1.3	1.3	9.3
1996	Utah	18	**13**	17.8	.425	.270	.750	3.9	1.1	.7	.4	6.2
1997	Utah	**20***	0	8.8	.400	.320	.600	1.6	.3	.4	.2	2.9
1998	Utah	17	0	14.1	.406	.304	.700	2.8	.6	.3	.2	4.5
1999	Phoenix	1	0	10.0	**1.000**	**1.000**	.000	1.0	.0	.0	.0	5.0
Career		69	24	16.6	.445	.295	.750	3.2	.8	.7	.5	6.5
