= 1992–93 Los Angeles Clippers season =

NBA professional basketball team season

- Head coach: Larry Brown
- Owners: Donald Sterling
- Arena: Los Angeles Sports Arena

Results
- Record: 41–41 (.500)
- Place: Division: 4th (Pacific); Conference: 7th (Western)
- Playoff finish: West First Round (lost to the Houston Rockets 2–3)
- Stats at Basketball Reference

Local media
- Television: KCOP-TV (Ralph Lawler, Bill Walton); SportsChannel Los Angeles (Joel Meyers, Jerry Tarkanian)
- Radio: KMPC (Rich Marotta)

The 1992–93 Los Angeles Clippers season was the 23rd season for the Los Angeles Clippers in the National Basketball Association, and their ninth season in Los Angeles, California.

== Season summary ==
=== Off-season ===
In the 1992 NBA draft, the Clippers selected point guard Randy Woods out of La Salle University with the 16th overall pick, and also selected center Elmore Spencer from the University of Nevada, Las Vegas with the 25th overall pick. During the off-season, the team acquired Mark Jackson from the New York Knicks, and acquired second-year center Stanley Roberts from the Orlando Magic in a three-team trade, acquired Hot Plate Williams from the Washington Bullets, and signed free agent Kiki Vandeweghe.

=== Regular season ===
With the addition of Jackson, Roberts and Williams, the Clippers lost their first three games of the regular season, but then won 12 of their next 16 games. The team played around .500 in winning percentage for the first half of the season, holding a 26–25 record at the All-Star break. The Clippers played slightly below .500 for the remainder of the season, and finished in fourth place in the Pacific Division with a 41–41 record, earning the seventh seed in the Western Conference, and qualifying for their second consecutive NBA playoff appearance.

Danny Manning averaged 22.8 points, 6.6 rebounds, 1.4 steals and 1.3 blocks per game, while Ron Harper averaged 18.0 points, 4.5 assists and 2.2 steals per game, and Jackson provided the team with 14.4 points, 8.8 assists and 1.7 steals per game. In addition, Ken Norman contributed 15.0 points and 7.5 rebounds per game, and Roberts provided with 11.3 points, 6.2 rebounds and 1.8 blocks per game. Off the bench, Loy Vaught averaged 9.4 points and 6.2 rebounds per game, while Williams provided with 6.6 points and 4.3 rebounds per game, Gary Grant contributed 6.6 points, 4.8 assists and 1.4 steals per game, and Vandeweghe contributed 6.2 points per game, but only played just 41 games.

During the NBA All-Star weekend at the Delta Center in Salt Lake City, Utah, Manning was selected for the 1993 NBA All-Star Game, as a member of the Western Conference All-Star team; it was his first ever All-Star appearance. It was also the first time that a Clippers player participated in the NBA All-Star Game since the 1985–86 season, in which former Clippers star Marques Johnson was selected for the 1986 NBA All-Star Game at the Reunion Arena in Dallas, Texas.

The Clippers finished 23rd in the NBA in home-game attendance, with an attendance of 532,625 at the Los Angeles Memorial Sports Arena during the regular season, which was the fifth-lowest in the league.

=== NBA playoffs ===
In the Western Conference First Round of the 1993 NBA playoffs, the Clippers faced off against the 2nd–seeded, and Midwest Division champion Houston Rockets, who were led by All-Star center, and Defensive Player of the Year, Hakeem Olajuwon, All-Star forward Otis Thorpe, and Vernon Maxwell. The Rockets took a 2–1 series lead, but the Clippers managed to win Game 4 at home, 93–90 at the Los Angeles Memorial Sports Arena to even the series. However, the Clippers lost Game 5 to the Rockets on the road, 84–80 at The Summit, thus losing in a hard-fought five-game series.

=== Aftermath ===
Following the season, head coach Larry Brown resigned and left to take a coaching job with the Indiana Pacers, while Norman signed as a free agent with the Milwaukee Bucks, and Vandeweghe retired. The Clippers would not return to the NBA playoffs again until the 1996–97 season.

== Draft picks ==
Round	Pick	Player	Position	Nationality	College
1	16	Randy Woods	PG	United States	La Salle
1	25	Elmore Spencer	C	United States	UNLV

== Roster ==
1992–93 Los Angeles Clippers roster
Players

Pos.	No.	Player	Height	Weight	DOB	From
PG	7	Lester Conner	6 ft 4 in (1.93 m)	180 lb (82 kg)	1959–09–17	Oregon State
PG	23	Gary Grant	6 ft 3 in (1.91 m)	185 lb (84 kg)	1965–04–21	Michigan
PG	4	Ron Harper	6 ft 6 in (1.98 m)	216 lb (98 kg)	1964–01–20	Miami (OH)
SG	8	Jaren Jackson	6 ft 6 in (1.98 m)	215 lb (98 kg)	1967–10–27	Georgetown
PG	13	Mark Jackson	6 ft 1 in (1.85 m)	185 lb (84 kg)	1965–04–01	St. John's
PF	5	Danny Manning	6 ft 10 in (2.08 m)	234 lb (106 kg)	1966–05–17	Kansas
SF	3	Ken Norman	6 ft 8 in (2.03 m)	223 lb (101 kg)	1964–09–05	Illinois
C	53	Stanley Roberts	7 ft 0 in (2.13 m)	285 lb (129 kg)	1970–02–07	LSU
C	27	Elmore Spencer	7 ft 0 in (2.13 m)	270 lb (122 kg)	1969–12–06	UNLV
PF	55	Kiki Vandeweghe	6 ft 8 in (2.03 m)	220 lb (100 kg)	1958–08–01	UCLA
PF	35	Loy Vaught	6 ft 9 in (2.06 m)	230 lb (104 kg)	1968–02–27	Michigan
SG	10	Duane Washington	6 ft 4 in (1.93 m)	195 lb (88 kg)	1964–08–31	Tennessee State
PF	34	John Williams	6 ft 8 in (2.03 m)	295 lb (134 kg)	1966–10–26	LSU
PG	14	Randy Woods	5 ft 10 in (1.78 m)	185 lb (84 kg)	1970–09–23	La Salle

Coaches
Head coach
- Larry Brown
Assistant(s)
- R. C. Buford
- John Hammond
- Quin Snyder

Legend
- (DP) Unsigned draft pick
- (FA) Free agent
- (S) Suspended
- Injured

Roster
Updated: 2009-10-04

== Regular season ==
=== Season standings ===
Pacific Division	W	L	PCT	GB	Home	Road	Div
y-Phoenix Suns	62	20	.756	—	35–6	27–14	21–9
x-Seattle SuperSonics	55	27	.671	7	33–8	22–19	22–8
x-Portland Trail Blazers	51	31	.622	11	30–11	21–20	19–11
x-Los Angeles Clippers	41	41	.500	21	27–14	14–27	15–15
x-Los Angeles Lakers	39	43	.476	23	20–21	19–22	13–17
Golden State Warriors	34	48	.415	28	19–22	15–26	9–21
Sacramento Kings	25	57	.305	37	16–25	9–32	6–24

#	Western Conference				
#	Team	W	L	PCT	GB
1	z-Phoenix Suns	62	20	.756	–
2	y-Houston Rockets	55	27	.671	7
3	x-Seattle SuperSonics	55	27	.671	7
4	x-Portland Trail Blazers	51	31	.622	11
5	x-San Antonio Spurs	49	33	.598	13
6	x-Utah Jazz	47	35	.573	15
7	x-Los Angeles Clippers	41	41	.500	21
8	x-Los Angeles Lakers	39	43	.476	23
9	Denver Nuggets	36	46	.439	26
10	Golden State Warriors	34	48	.415	28
11	Sacramento Kings	25	57	.305	37
12	Minnesota Timberwolves	19	63	.232	43
13	Dallas Mavericks	11	71	.134	51

z – clinched division title
y – clinched division title
x – clinched playoff spot

== Game log ==
=== Regular season ===
1992–93 game log
Total: 41–41 (home: 27–14; road: 14–27)
November: 7–6 (home: 4–2; road: 3–4)

Game	Date	Team	Score	High points	High rebounds	High assists	Location Attendance	Record

December: 8–6 (home: 6–3; road: 2–3)

Game	Date	Team	Score	High points	High rebounds	High assists	Location Attendance	Record

January: 7–8 (home: 3–2; road: 4–6)

Game	Date	Team	Score	High points	High rebounds	High assists	Location Attendance	Record

February: 6–6 (home: 4–3; road: 2–3)

Game	Date	Team	Score	High points	High rebounds	High assists	Location Attendance	Record

March: 6–10 (home: 4–3; road: 2–7)

Game	Date	Team	Score	High points	High rebounds	High assists	Location Attendance	Record

April: 7–5 (home: 6–1; road: 1–4)

Game	Date	Team	Score	High points	High rebounds	High assists	Location Attendance	Record

1992–93 schedule

=== Playoffs ===
1993 playoff game log
First round: 2–3 (home: 1–1; road: 1–2)

Game	Date	Team	Score	High points	High rebounds	High assists	Location Attendance	Series
1	April 29	@ Houston	L 94–117	Mark Jackson (26)	three players tied (8)	Gary Grant (8)	The Summit; 16,611	0–1
2	May 1	@ Houston	W 95–83	Ron Harper (29)	Ken Norman (12)	Mark Jackson (8)	The Summit; 16,611	1–1
3	May 3	Houston	L 99–111	Danny Manning (23)	Ron Harper (9)	Mark Jackson (8)	Los Angeles Memorial Sports Arena; 12,628	1–2
4	May 5	Houston	W 93–90	Ron Harper (21)	Stanley Roberts (13)	Mark Jackson (7)	Los Angeles Memorial Sports Arena; 14,710	2–2
5	May 8	@ Houston	L 80–84	Danny Manning (24)	Danny Manning (12)	Mark Jackson (9)	The Summit; 16,611	2–3

1993 schedule

== Player statistics ==
Legend
GP	Games played	GS	Games started	MPG	Minutes per game
FG%	Field-goal percentage	3P%	3-point field-goal percentage	FT%	Free-throw percentage
RPG	Rebounds per game	APG	Assists per game	SPG	Steals per game
BPG	Blocks per game	PPG	Points per game

=== Season ===
Player	GP	GS	MPG	FG%	3P%	FT%	RPG	APG	SPG	BPG	PPG
Danny Manning	79	77	34.9	50.9	26.7	80.2	6.6	2.6	1.4	1.3	22.8
Ron Harper	80	77	37.1	45.1	28.0	76.9	5.3	4.5	2.2	0.9	18.0
Ken Norman	76	71	32.6	51.1	26.3	59.5	7.5	2.2	0.8	0.8	15.0
Mark Jackson	82	81	38.0	48.6	26.8	80.3	4.7	8.8	1.7	0.1	14.4
Stanley Roberts	77	76	23.6	52.7	0.0	48.8	6.2	0.8	0.4	1.8	11.3
Loy Vaught	79	4	20.9	50.8	25.0	74.8	6.2	0.7	0.7	0.5	9.4
John Williams	74	8	22.1	43.0	22.6	54.3	4.3	1.9	1.1	0.3	6.6
Gary Grant	74	8	21.9	44.1	26.2	74.3	1.9	4.8	1.4	0.1	6.6
Kiki VanDeWeghe	41	3	12.0	45.3	32.4	87.9	1.2	0.6	0.3	0.2	6.2
Jaren Jackson	34	0	10.3	41.4	40.0	85.2	1.1	1.0	0.6	0.1	3.9
Lester Conner	31	0	13.6	45.2	0.0	94.7	1.6	2.1	1.1	0.1	2.4
Elmore Spencer	44	4	6.4	53.7	0.0	50.0	1.4	0.2	0.2	0.4	2.4
Randy Woods	41	1	4.2	34.8	21.4	73.1	0.3	1.0	0.3	0.0	1.7
Duane Washington	4	0	7.0	0.0	0.0	0.0	0.5	1.3	0.3	0.0	0.0
Alex Stivrins	1	0	1.0	0.0	0.0	0.0	0.0	0.0	0.0	0.0	0.0

=== Playoffs ===
Player	GP	GS	MPG	FG%	3P%	FT%	RPG	APG	SPG	BPG	PPG
Danny Manning	5	5	34.2	41.2	0.0	80.8	7.2	1.6	1.4	1.0	18.2
Ron Harper	5	5	34.8	47.4	50.0	64.7	4.0	3.2	3.0	2.0	18.0
Mark Jackson	5	5	37.6	43.8	50.0	86.4	5.8	7.6	1.6	0.2	15.2
Ken Norman	5	5	32.8	37.3	37.5	50.0	8.2	2.4	0.8	0.0	12.8
Stanley Roberts	5	5	29.8	52.0	0.0	27.8	8.2	0.2	0.6	0.6	11.4
Loy Vaught	3	0	16.7	40.0	0.0	80.0	6.0	0.0	1.3	0.3	5.3
Gary Grant	5	0	20.2	32.3	0.0	50.0	0.4	4.6	0.6	0.0	4.2
Lester Conner	5	0	12.8	75.0	100.0	100.0	1.4	2.0	0.6	0.2	4.2
Kiki VanDeWeghe	1	0	9.0	33.3	0.0	0.0	0.0	1.0	1.0	0.0	4.0
Jaren Jackson	4	0	7.0	38.5	0.0	0.0	1.3	0.5	0.5	0.0	2.5
John Williams	5	0	19.6	22.2	66.7	50.0	2.8	1.4	1.0	0.0	2.2
Elmore Spencer	2	0	2.0	0.0	0.0	0.0	0.5	0.0	0.0	0.0	0.0

Player statistics citation:

== Awards, records and milestones ==
=== All-Star ===
Danny Manning selected as a reserve forward for the Western Conference All-Stars. Manning is the first Clipper All-Star since Marques Johnson was selected in 1986.

== Transactions ==
The Clippers were involved in the following transactions during the 1992–93 season.

=== Trades ===
June 24, 1992
To Los Angeles Clippers

- William Bedford & draft rights to Don MacLean
To Detroit Pistons

- Olden Polynice & 1996 and 1997 second-round draft picks
September 22, 1992
To Los Angeles Clippers

- Mark Jackson & 1995 second-round draft pick
To New York Knicks

- Charles Smith, Doc Rivers & Bo Kimble
September 22, 1992
To Los Angeles Clippers

- Stanley Roberts
To Orlando Magic

- 1993 or 1994 first-round draft pick
October 8, 1992
To Los Angeles Clippers

- John Williams
To Washington Bullets

- William Bedford & draft rights to Don MacLean

=== Free agents ===
==== Additions ==== : Player / Signed / Former team	==== Subtractions ==== : Player / Left / New team

Player Transactions Citation:

== See also ==
- Los Angeles Clippers
- Los Angeles Memorial Sports Arena
