= 1993 NBA All-Star Game =

NBA All Star Game In 1993

	1	2	3	4	OT	Total
East	26	26	32	35	13	132
West	27	30	29	33	16	135
- Date: February 21, 1993
- Arena: Delta Center
- City: Salt Lake City
- MVP: Karl Malone and John Stockton (Co-MVPs)
- National anthem: Boyz II Men
- Attendance: 19,459
- Network: NBC; TNT (All-Star Saturday)
- Announcers: Dick Enberg, Mike Fratello and Magic Johnson; Bob Neal, Doug Collins and Hubie Brown (All-Star Saturday)

NBA All-Star Game
< 1992	1994 >

The 1993 NBA All-Star Game took place on February 21, 1993, and was an exhibition game played between the Eastern Conference and the Western Conference at the Delta Center in Salt Lake City, home of the Utah Jazz. This was the 43rd edition National Basketball Association all-star game played during the 1992-1993 season. The Western Conference went on to beat the East 135 to 132 in overtime. The slam dunk competition on All-Star Saturday night was won by Harold Miner from the Miami Heat, and the three-point shootout was won by Mark Price from the Cleveland Cavaliers. The regular season then continued on Tuesday, February 23, 1993.

This is the first NBA All-Star Game to be aired in primetime on the East Coast, and the first in which Law & Order served as the lead-out program for the NBA All-Star Game, thus beginning the tradition of a series from the Law & Order franchise airing after the game.

== Coaches ==
The coaches for the 1993 NBA All-Star Game were chosen for the best current season win percentage in their conference through the games of February 18, 1993.

The head coach for the Eastern Conference was Pat Riley, head coach of the New York Knicks for the regular season, and his 9th NBA All-Star appearance as a head coach. The head coach for the Western Conference was Paul Westphal, first year as head coach of the Phoenix Suns for the regular season.

== Players ==
The 1993 NBA All-Star game would be a highlight for many NBA players. This would be Michael Jordan's last NBA All-Star game before leaving the NBA for the first time, although he would return to play in five more. For Isiah Thomas, this would be his last NBA All-Star appearance; meanwhile, this would also be the All-Star debut of Shaquille O'Neal, and the first time the Orlando Magic and Charlotte Hornets franchises ever had a player in the NBA All-Star Game. Playing on their home court, Karl Malone and John Stockton shared the game's MVP award. The starters for the Eastern Conference included: Michael Jordan as shooting guard, Isiah Thomas as point guard, Scottie Pippen as small forward, Larry Johnson as power forward, and Shaquille O'Neal as center. The starters for the Western Conference included: Clyde Drexler as shooting guard, John Stockton as point guard Charles Barkley as small forward, Karl Malone as Power forward, and David Robinson as Center. All starters would end up in the Naismith Memorial Basketball Hall of Fame except for Larry Johnson. Mitch Richmond on Western Conference was injured and replaced by Terry Porter. Chris Mullin on the Western Conference team was also injured; however, he was not replaced by anyone.

== Rosters ==
Eastern Conference All-Stars
Pos.	Player	Team	Appearance
Coach
HC	Pat Riley	New York Knicks	9th
Starters
PG	Isiah Thomas	Detroit Pistons	12th
SG	Michael Jordan	Chicago Bulls	9th
SF	Scottie Pippen	Chicago Bulls	3rd
PF	Larry Johnson	Charlotte Hornets	1st
C	Shaquille O'Neal	Orlando Magic	1st
Reserves
C	Brad Daugherty	Cleveland Cavaliers	5th
SG/PG	Joe Dumars	Detroit Pistons	4th
C	Patrick Ewing	New York Knicks	7th
PF	Larry Nance	Cleveland Cavaliers	3rd
PG	Mark Price	Cleveland Cavaliers	3rd
PF/SF	Detlef Schrempf	Indiana Pacers	1st
SF	Dominique Wilkins	Atlanta Hawks	8th

Western Conference All-Stars
Pos.	Player	Team	Appearance
Coach
HC	Paul Westphal	Phoenix Suns	1st
Starters
PG	John Stockton	Utah Jazz	5th
SG	Clyde Drexler	Portland Trail Blazers	7th
SF	Charles Barkley	Phoenix Suns	7th
PF	Karl Malone	Utah Jazz	6th
C	David Robinson	San Antonio Spurs	4th
Reserves
SF	Sean Elliott	San Antonio Spurs	1st
PG	Tim Hardaway	Golden State Warriors	3rd
PF	Shawn Kemp	Seattle SuperSonics	1st
SF/SG	Dan Majerle	Phoenix Suns	2nd
C/PF	Danny Manning	Los Angeles Clippers	1st
C	Hakeem Olajuwon	Houston Rockets	8th
PG	Terry Porter	Portland Trail Blazers	2nd ^{REP}
SG	Mitch Richmond	Sacramento Kings	1st ^{INJ}
SF	Chris Mullin	Golden State Warriors	5th (DNP)

Chris Mullin and Mitch Richmond were selected to play but couldn't due to injury.

Mitch Richmond was replaced by Terry Porter.

Chris Mullin was not replaced by anyone.

== Score by periods ==
Score by periods:	1	2	3	4	OT	Final
East	26	26	32	35	13	132
West	27	30	29	33	16	135

- Halftime— West, 57–52
- Third Quarter— West, 86–84
- Officials: Jack Madden, Hue Hollins, and Bennett Salvatore
- Attendance: 19,459.
