= Darrell Walker =

American basketball coach & player (born 1961)

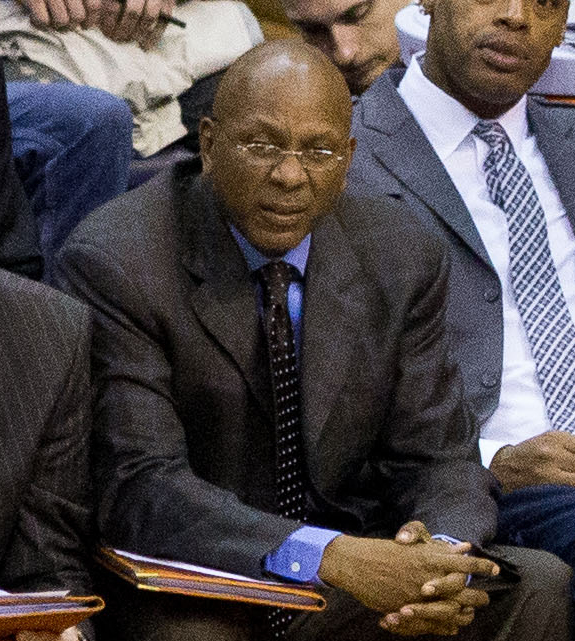
- Walker in 2013

Personal information
- Born: March 9, 1961 (age 65) Chicago, Illinois, U.S.
- Listed height: 6 ft 4 in (1.93 m)
- Listed weight: 180 lb (82 kg)

Career information
- High school: Corliss (Chicago, Illinois)
- College: Arkansas–Fort Smith (1979–1980); Arkansas (1980–1983)
- NBA draft: 1983: 1st round, 12th overall pick
- Drafted by: New York Knicks
- Playing career: 1983–1993
- Position: Point guard / shooting guard
- Number: 4, 5, 20

Career history

Playing
- 1983–1986: New York Knicks
- 1986–1987: Denver Nuggets
- 1988–1991: Washington Bullets
- 1991–1992: Detroit Pistons
- 1993: Chicago Bulls

Coaching
- 1995–1996: Toronto Raptors (assistant)
- 1996–1998: Toronto Raptors
- 1999–2000: Rockford Lightning
- 2000: Washington Wizards
- 2000: Washington Mystics (interim)
- 2004–2008: New Orleans Hornets (assistant)
- 2008–2011: Detroit Pistons (assistant)
- 2012–2014: New York Knicks (assistant)
- 2016–2018: Clark Atlanta
- 2018–2026: Little Rock

Career highlights
- As player: NBA champion (1993); NBA All-Rookie First Team (1984); Consensus second-team All-American (1983); SWC Player of the Year (1983); First-team All-SWC (1983); 2x SWC Defensive Player of the year (1982, 1983); 2x SWC All-Defensive team (1982, 1983); As coach: SIAC tournament champion (2017); Sun Belt regular season champion (2020); OVC regular season champion (2024); Sun Belt Coach of the Year (2020); OVC Coach of the Year (2024)

Career statistics
- Points: 6,389 (8.9 ppg)
- Assists: 3,276 (4.6 apg)
- Steals: 1,090 (1.5 spg)
- Stats at NBA.com
- Stats at Basketball Reference

Darrell Walker (born March 9, 1961) is an American college basketball coach and retired professional player. He was most recently head men's coach at the University of Arkansas at Little Rock. Walker played in National Basketball Association (NBA) for 10 seasons, winning an NBA championship with the Chicago Bulls in 1993. He played college basketball for Westark Community College and the Arkansas Razorbacks.

== Playing career ==
After graduating from Chicago's Corliss High School, Walker played college basketball at Westark Community College (now the University of Arkansas–Fort Smith) and the University of Arkansas. He was selected by the New York Knicks with the 12th pick in the first round of the 1983 NBA draft. Over a ten-year career, he played for five teams—the Knicks, the Denver Nuggets, the Washington Bullets, the Detroit Pistons, and the Chicago Bulls. Walker is a member of Kappa Alpha Psi fraternity.

Walker was selected to the 1984 NBA All-Rookie team, and was among the league leaders during his career in assists and steals. His best season was in 1989–90 with the Washington Bullets when he averaged 9.5 points, 8.8 rebounds and 8.0 assists per game. He won an NBA title with the Chicago Bulls in his final season.

== Coaching career ==
Walker has served as head coach for two different teams—the Toronto Raptors and the Washington Wizards. He was the Raptors' second coach, following Brendan Malone, and led the team for a season and a half. In 2000, he replaced the fired Gar Heard in Washington for half a season (the first coaching "call-up" in history, having previously been the coach of the Rockford Lightning of the CBA), but was then replaced by Leonard Hamilton the next year. Later that same year, he was named the interim head coach of the Washington Mystics of the WNBA, replacing Nancy Darsch who resigned during the season. He remained in Washington as director of player personnel and later head scout before joining the Hornets as assistant coach.

In March 2012, Walker became an assistant coach with the New York Knicks, where he was on staff until 2014.

=== College ===
Walker was named the head coach at Clark Atlanta University in 2016. In two seasons with the Panthers, Walker guided the team to a 45–18 overall record a SIAC conference tournament championship, and two appearances in the NCAA Division II tournament.

On March 27, 2018, Walker was named the head men's basketball coach at the University of Arkansas at Little Rock. Walker coached for the Trojans for eight seasons, being fired by UALR on March 6, 2026 after a season with a 12–20 record.

== Career playing statistics ==
Legend
GP	Games played	GS	Games started	MPG	Minutes per game
FG%	Field goal percentage	3P%	3-point field goal percentage	FT%	Free throw percentage
RPG	Rebounds per game	APG	Assists per game	SPG	Steals per game
BPG	Blocks per game	PPG	Points per game	**Bold**	Career high
†	Won an NBA championship	*	Led the league

=== NBA ===
==== Regular season ====
Year	Team	GP	GS	MPG	FG%	3P%	FT%	RPG	APG	SPG	BPG	PPG
1983–84	New York	**82***	0	16.1	.417	**.267**	**.791**	2.0	3.5	1.5	.2	7.9
1984–85	New York	**82***	66	30.4	.435	.000	.700	3.4	5.0	**2.0**	.3	**13.5**
1985–86	New York	81	35	25.0	.430	.000	.686	2.7	4.2	1.8	.4	10.3
1986–87	Denver	81	25	24.9	**.482**	.000	.745	4.0	3.5	1.5	**.5**	12.2
1987–88	Washington	52	0	18.1	.392	.000	.781	2.4	1.9	1.2	.2	6.0
1988–89	Washington	79	78	32.5	.420	.000	.772	6.4	6.3	**2.0**	.3	9.0
1989–90	Washington	81	**81**	**35.6**	.454	.095	.687	**8.8**	**8.0**	1.7	.4	9.5
1990–91	Washington	71	65	32.5	.430	.000	.604	7.0	6.5	1.1	**.5**	7.8
1991–92	Detroit	74	4	20.8	.423	.000	.619	3.2	2.8	.9	.2	5.2
1992–93	Detroit	9	2	16.0	.158	.000	.333	2.1	1.0	1.1	.0	.9
1992–93†	Chicago	28	0	13.1	.403	–	.500	1.4	1.6	.8	.1	2.6
Career		720	356	25.8	.435	.059	.713	4.4	4.6	1.5	.3	8.9

==== Playoffs ====
Year	Team	GP	GS	MPG	FG%	3P%	FT%	RPG	APG	SPG	BPG	PPG
1984	New York	**12**		16.3	.370	–	.609	2.9	1.7	**2.0**	.2	6.8
1987	Denver	3	**3**	22.7	.324	–	.571	3.3	1.7	.7	.0	8.7
1988	Washington	5	0	**31.0**	**.407**	.000	.688	**4.8**	**2.8**	1.4	**.8**	**11.0**
1992	Detroit	5	0	13.6	.333	–	**1.000**	2.4	.8	.2	.0	2.0
1993†	Chicago	9	0	2.4	.250	–	.667	.1	.6	.0	.0	.4
Career		34	3	14.9	.368	.000	.645	2.4	1.4	1.0	.2	5.2

== Head coaching record ==
=== NBA ===
Legend
Regular season	G	Games coached	W	Games won	L	Games lost	W–L %	Win–loss %
Playoffs	PG	Playoff games	PW	Playoff wins	PL	Playoff losses	PW–L %	Playoff win–loss %

Team	Year	G	W	L	W–L%	Finish	PG	PW	PL	PW–L%	Result
Toronto	1996–97	82	30	52	.366	8th in Central	–	–	–	–	Missed Playoffs
Toronto	1997–98	49	11	38	.224	(fired)	–	–	–	–	–
Washington	1999–00	38	15	23	.395	7th in Atlantic	–	–	–	–	Missed Playoffs
Career		169	56	113	.331		–	–	–	–	

=== WNBA ===
Legend
Regular season	G	Games coached	W	Games won	L	Games lost	W–L %	Win–loss %
Playoffs	PG	Playoff games	PW	Playoff wins	PL	Playoff losses	PW–L %	Playoff win–loss %

Team	Year	G	W	L	W–L%	Finish	PG	PW	PL	PW–L%	Result
Washington	2000	12	5	7	.417	4th in East	2	0	2	.000	Lost in Conference semifinals
Career		12	5	7	.417		2	0	2	.000	

=== College ===
Record table
Season	Team	Overall	Conference	Standing	Postseason
Clark Atlanta Panthers (Southern Intercollegiate Athletic Conference) (2016–2018)
2016–17	Clark Atlanta	21–12	12–5	2nd (East)	NCAA Division II First Round
2017–18	Clark Atlanta	24–6	16–3	2nd (East)	NCAA Division II First Round
Clark Atlanta:		45–18 (.714)	28–8 (.778)		
Little Rock Trojans (Sun Belt Conference) (2018–2022)
2018–19	Little Rock	10–21	5–13	T–11th	
2019–20	Little Rock	21–10	15–5	1st	No postseason held
2020–21	Little Rock	11–15	7–11	5th (West)	
2021–22	Little Rock	9–19	3–11	12th	
Little Rock Trojans (Ohio Valley Conference) (2022–2026)
2022–23	Little Rock	10–21	6–12	T–8th	
2023–24	Little Rock	21–13	14–4	T–1st	CBI First Round
2024–25	Little Rock	19–14	12–8	T–3rd	
2025–26	Little Rock	12–20	9–11	7th	
Little Rock:		113–133 (.459)	61–71 (.462)		
Total:		158–151 (.511)			
National champion Postseason invitational champion Conference regular season champion Conference regular season and conference tournament champion Division regular season champion Division regular season and conference tournament champion Conference tournament champion
