= 1992–93 Chicago Bulls season =

NBA professional basketball team season (won championship)

- NBA champions
- Conference champions
- Division champions
- Head coach: Phil Jackson
- General manager: Jerry Krause
- Owners: Jerry Reinsdorf
- Arena: Chicago Stadium

Results
- Record: 57–25 (.695)
- Place: Division: 1st (Central); Conference: 2nd (Eastern)
- Playoff finish: NBA champions (Defeated Suns 4–2)
- Stats at Basketball Reference

Local media
- Television: WGN-TV; SportsChannel Chicago
- Radio: WMAQ

The 1992–93 Chicago Bulls season was the 27th season for the Chicago Bulls in the National Basketball Association. The Bulls entered the regular season as the back-to-back defending NBA champions, having defeated the Portland Trail Blazers in the 1992 NBA Finals in six games, winning their second NBA championship.

== Season summary ==
=== Off-season ===
During the off-season, the team acquired Rodney McCray from the Dallas Mavericks in a three-team trade, and signed free agent Trent Tucker. At mid-season, the team signed Darrell Walker, who was previously released by the Detroit Pistons.

For the season, the Bulls slightly updated their home and road uniforms; the team added a black outline to the player's last name on the back of their white home jerseys, and changed the color of the player's last name from white to black on the back of their red road jerseys. The updated uniforms would remain in use until 2004, where they would add their secondary logo on the back of their jerseys.

=== Regular season ===
After two straight championships, the Bulls changed their starting lineup, replacing John Paxson at point guard with B. J. Armstrong, after Paxson suffered a knee injury and only played 59 games. The team won nine of their first eleven games of the regular season, posted a seven-game winning streak between December and January, and later on held a 35–17 record at the All-Star break. The Bulls posted another seven-game winning streak between February and March, and had another successful season finishing in first place in the Central Division with a 57–25 record, and earning the second seed in the Eastern Conference; the team qualified for the NBA playoffs for the ninth consecutive year.

Michael Jordan once again led the league in scoring averaging 32.6 points, 6.7 rebounds, 5.5 assists and 2.8 steals per game, and was named to the All-NBA First Team, while Scottie Pippen averaged 18.6 points, 7.7 rebounds, 6.3 assists and 2.1 steals per game, and was named to the All-NBA Third Team, and Horace Grant provided the team with 13.2 points, 9.5 rebounds and 1.2 blocks per game, and was named to the NBA All-Defensive Second Team. In addition, Armstrong contributed 12.3 points and 4.0 assists per game, while off the bench, Scott Williams provided with 5.9 points and 6.4 rebounds per game, and starting center Bill Cartwright contributed 5.6 points per game. Jordan and Pippen were both named to the NBA All-Defensive First Team.

During the NBA All-Star weekend at the Delta Center in Salt Lake City, Utah, Jordan and Pippen were both selected for the 1993 NBA All-Star Game, as members of the Eastern Conference All-Star team. Jordan scored 30 points along with 5 assists and 4 steals, despite the Eastern Conference losing to the Western Conference in overtime, 135–132. Meanwhile, Armstrong participated in the NBA Three-Point Shootout. Free agent and former Bulls guard Craig Hodges also participated in the Three-Point Shootout, despite not being part of an active NBA roster; Hodges last played in the NBA for the Bulls during the previous season, and was released to free agency afterwards. Jordan finished in third place in Most Valuable Player voting, behind Charles Barkley of the Phoenix Suns, and Hakeem Olajuwon of the Houston Rockets, and also finished tied in second place in Defensive Player of the Year voting, also behind Olajuwon.

The Bulls finished sixth in the NBA in home-game attendance, with an attendance of 759,656 at the Chicago Stadium during the regular season.

=== NBA playoffs ===
In the Eastern Conference First Round of the 1993 NBA playoffs, the Bulls faced off against the 7th–seeded Atlanta Hawks, a team that featured All-Star forward Dominique Wilkins, All-Star forward Kevin Willis, and Mookie Blaylock. The Bulls won the first two games over the Hawks at home at the Chicago Stadium, before winning Game 3 on the road, 98–88 at the Omni Coliseum, in which Jordan scored 39 points despite a sprained right ankle injury; the Bulls won the series over the Hawks in a three-game sweep.

In the Eastern Conference Semi-finals, and for the second consecutive year, the team faced off against the 3rd–seeded Cleveland Cavaliers, who were led by the All-Star trio of Brad Daugherty, Mark Price and Larry Nance. The Bulls won the first two games over the Cavaliers at the Chicago Stadium, and then won the next two games on the road. In Game 4 at the Coliseum at Richfield, Jordan hit another game-winning buzzer-beater against the Cavaliers, as the Bulls won the game, 103–101 to win the series in a four-game sweep, and advance to the Conference Finals for the fifth consecutive year, becoming the first team since the 1987–88 Boston Celtics to do so.

In the Eastern Conference Finals, and for the third consecutive year, the Bulls faced off against the top–seeded, and Atlantic Division champion New York Knicks, who were led by the trio of All-Star center Patrick Ewing, John Starks, and former Bulls forward Charles Oakley. The Bulls lost the first two games to the Knicks on the road at Madison Square Garden, but managed to win the next two games at the Chicago Stadium to even the series. After winning Game 5 at Madison Square Garden by a score of 97–94, the Bulls won Game 6 over the Knicks at the Chicago Stadium, 96–88 to win the series in six games, and advance to the NBA Finals for the third consecutive year.

In the 1993 NBA Finals, the Bulls faced off against the top–seeded Suns, who were led by the All-Star trio of Barkley, three-point specialist Dan Majerle, and Kevin Johnson; the Suns had home-court advantage in the series since they finished with a league-best 62–20 record during the regular season. The Bulls won the first two games on the road at the America West Arena, but then lost Game 3 to the Suns at home in triple-overtime, 129–121 at the Chicago Stadium. With a 3–2 series lead, the Bulls won Game 6 over the Suns at the America West Arena, as Paxson made a game-winning three-point shot to win the game, 99–98; the Bulls won the series in six games to win their third consecutive NBA championship, as Jordan was named the NBA Finals Most Valuable Player for the third straight year. This was the last title the Bulls won while playing at the Chicago Stadium.

=== Aftermath ===
The Bulls' off-season was marked by Jordan's sudden retirement after the murder of his father, James R. Jordan Sr.; Jordan would later on pursue a baseball career. Meanwhile, McCray, Tucker, and Walker were all released to free agency.

== Offseason ==
=== NBA draft ===
Round	Pick	Player	Position	Nationality	School/Club team
1	27	Byron Houston	Forward	United States	Oklahoma State
2	33	Corey Williams	Guard	United States	Oklahoma State
2	39	Litterial Green	Guard	United States	Georgia

== Roster ==
1992–93 Chicago Bulls roster
Players

Pos.	No.	Player	Height	Weight	DOB	From
PG	10	BJ Armstrong	6 ft 2 in (1.88 m)	175 lb (79 kg)	1967–09–09	Iowa
SF	17	Ricky Blanton	6 ft 7 in (2.01 m)	215 lb (98 kg)	1966–04–21	LSU
C	24	Bill Cartwright	7 ft 1 in (2.16 m)	245 lb (111 kg)	1957–07–30	San Francisco
PF	40	Joe Courtney	6 ft 8 in (2.03 m)	235 lb (107 kg)	1967–10–17	Mississippi State
SG	3	Jo Jo English	6 ft 4 in (1.93 m)	195 lb (88 kg)	1970–02–04	South Carolina
PF	54	Horace Grant	6 ft 10 in (2.08 m)	245 lb (111 kg)	1965–07–04	Clemson
SG	23	Michael Jordan	6 ft 6 in (1.98 m)	215 lb (98 kg)	1963–02–17	North Carolina
PF	21	Stacey King	6 ft 11 in (2.11 m)	230 lb (104 kg)	1967–01–29	Oklahoma
SF	22	Rodney McCray	6 ft 7 in (2.01 m)	220 lb (100 kg)	1961–08–29	Louisville
SF	45	Ed Nealy	6 ft 7 in (2.01 m)	238 lb (108 kg)	1960–02–19	Kansas State
PG	5	John Paxson	6 ft 2 in (1.88 m)	185 lb (84 kg)	1960–09–29	Notre Dame
C	32	Will Perdue	7 ft 0 in (2.13 m)	240 lb (109 kg)	1965–08–29	Vanderbilt
SF	33	Scottie Pippen	6 ft 7 in (2.01 m)	220 lb (100 kg)	1965–09–25	Central Arkansas
SG	6	Trent Tucker	6 ft 5 in (1.96 m)	193 lb (88 kg)	1959–12–20	Minnesota
SG	20	Darrell Walker	6 ft 4 in (1.93 m)	180 lb (82 kg)	1961–03–09	Arkansas
PG	12	Corey Williams	6 ft 2 in (1.88 m)	190 lb (86 kg)	1970–04–24	Oklahoma State
PF	42	Scott Williams	6 ft 10 in (2.08 m)	230 lb (104 kg)	1968–03–21	North Carolina

Coaches
Head coach
- Phil Jackson
Assistant(s)
- Johnny Bach
- Jim Cleamons
- Tex Winter

Legend
- (DP) Unsigned draft pick
- (FA) Free agent
- (S) Suspended
- Injured

Roster
Updated: February 25, 1993

== Regular season ==
=== Season standings ===
Central Division	W	L	PCT	GB	Home	Road	Div
y-Chicago Bulls	57	25	.695	—	31–10	26–15	19–9
x-Cleveland Cavaliers	54	28	.659	3	35–6	19–22	22–6
x-Charlotte Hornets	44	38	.537	13	22–19	22–19	12–16
x-Atlanta Hawks	43	39	.524	14	25–16	18–23	12–16
x-Indiana Pacers	41	41	.500	16	27–14	14–27	11–17
Detroit Pistons	40	42	.488	17	28–13	12–29	12–16
Milwaukee Bucks	28	54	.341	29	18–23	10–31	10–18

#	Eastern Conference				
#	Team	W	L	PCT	GB
1	c-New York Knicks	60	22	.732	–
2	y-Chicago Bulls	57	25	.695	3
3	x-Cleveland Cavaliers	54	28	.659	6
4	x-Boston Celtics	48	34	.585	12
5	x-Charlotte Hornets	44	38	.537	16
6	x-New Jersey Nets	43	39	.524	17
7	x-Atlanta Hawks	43	39	.524	17
8	x-Indiana Pacers	41	41	.500	19
9	Orlando Magic	41	41	.500	19
10	Detroit Pistons	40	42	.488	20
11	Miami Heat	36	46	.439	24
12	Milwaukee Bucks	28	54	.341	32
13	Philadelphia 76ers	26	56	.317	36
14	Washington Bullets	22	60	.268	38

== Game log ==
=== Regular season ===
1992–93 game log
Total: 57–25 (Home: 31–10; Road: 26–15)
November: 9–3 (home: 3–1; road: 6–2)

Game	Date	Team	Score	High points	High rebounds	High assists	Location Attendance	Record
1	November 6, 1992; 7:00 p.m. CST	@ Cleveland	W 101–96	Jordan (29)	Grant (15)	Pippen (10)	Richfield Coliseum; 20,273	1–0
2	November 7, 1992	Atlanta	L 99–100	Michael Jordan (35)	Horace Grant (11)	Michael Jordan (11)	Chicago Stadium; 18,676	1–1
3	November 9, 1992	Indiana	W 102–87	Michael Jordan (24)	Scottie Pippen (13)	Michael Jordan (12)	Chicago Stadium; 18,084	2–1
4	November 11, 1992	Detroit	W 98–96 (OT)	Michael Jordan (37)	Horace Grant (14)	Scottie Pippen (10)	Chicago Stadium; 18,676	3–1
5	November 13, 1992	@ Milwaukee	W 101–96	Michael Jordan (34)	Scottie Pippen (13)	Scottie Pippen (8)	Bradley Center; 18,633	4–1
6	November 14, 1992	Denver	W 117–84	Michael Jordan (18)	Will Perdue (13)	Michael Jordan (7)	Chicago Stadium; 18,676	5–1
7	November 17, 1992	@ Minnesota	W 124–103	Michael Jordan (32)	Scott Williams (6)	Scottie Pippen (12)	Target Center; 19,006	6–1
8	November 19, 1992; 9:00 p.m. CST	@ Seattle	W 108–99	Jordan (35)	Pippen, Williams (9)	Pippen (8)	Kingdome; 37,401	7–1
9	November 20, 1992; 9:30 p.m. CST	@ L.A. Lakers	L 118–120 (OT)	Jordan (54)	Grant (14)	Grant, Jordan (7)	Great Western Forum; 17,505	7–2
10	November 22, 1992; 8:00 p.m. CST	@ Phoenix	W 128–111	Jordan (40)	Grant, King (8)	Armstrong (9)	America West Arena; 19,023	8–2
11	November 24, 1992	@ Golden State	W 101–92	Michael Jordan (49)	Horace Grant (17)	Jordan & Pippen (7)	Oakland-Alameda County Coliseum Arena; 15,025	9–2
12	November 28, 1992; 12 Noon CST	@ New York	L 75–112	Jordan (17)	Grant, Pippen (7)	Jordan, Pippen (4)	Madison Square Garden; 19,763	9–3

December: 12–4 (home: 8–2; road: 4–2)

Game	Date	Team	Score	High points	High rebounds	High assists	Location Attendance	Record
13	December 2, 1992	@ Boston	L 96–101	Horace Grant (20)	Horace Grant (11)	Scottie Pippen (10)	Boston Garden; 14,890	9–4
14	December 4, 1992	Portland	W 111–99	Michael Jordan (38)	Michael Jordan (13)	Scottie Pippen (9)	Chicago Stadium; 18,676	10–4
15	December 5, 1992	Boston	W 96–89	Michael Jordan (24)	Horace Grant (10)	Scottie Pippen (11)	Chicago Stadium; 18,676	11–4
16	December 8, 1992	@ Atlanta	L 114–123	Michael Jordan (32)	Michael Jordan (12)	Michael Jordan (8)	The Omni; 16,441	11–5
17	December 9, 1992; 7:30 p.m. CST	Cleveland	W 108–91	Jordan (28)	Grant (15)	Pippen (11)	Chicago Stadium; 18,142	12–5
18	December 11, 1992; 7:30 p.m. CST	Houston	L 96–110	Jordan (26)	Jordan (11)	Pippen (8)	Chicago Stadium; 18,147	12–6
19	December 12, 1992; 7:30 p.m. CST	New Jersey	W 95–89	Jordan (38)	Grant (11)	Pippen (7)	Chicago Stadium; 18,232	13–6
20	December 15, 1992; 7:30 p.m. CST	Charlotte	W 125–110	Pippen (26)	Pippen (9)	Pippen (10)	Chicago Stadium; 18,088	14–6
21	December 17, 1992	@ Washington	W 107–99	Michael Jordan (28)	Scottie Pippen (13)	Michael Jordan (8)	Capital Centre; 18,756	15–6
22	December 19, 1992	Philadelphia	L 96–98	Michael Jordan (23)	Horace Grant (11)	Michael Jordan (10)	Chicago Stadium; 18,270	15–7
23	December 21, 1992	Miami	W 86–82	Scottie Pippen (22)	Michael Jordan (8)	3 players tied (4)	Chicago Stadium; 18,147	16–7
24	December 23, 1992	Washington	W 107–98	Michael Jordan (57)	Horace Grant (16)	Michael Jordan (10)	Chicago Stadium; 18,109	17–7
25	December 25, 1992; 8:00 p.m. CST	New York	W 89–77	Jordan (42)	Pippen (9)	Jordan, Pippen (5)	Chicago Stadium; 18,676	18–7
26	December 26, 1992	@ Indiana	W 95–84	Horace Grant (30)	Horace Grant (20)	Michael Jordan (8)	Market Square Arena; 16,530	19–7
27	December 29, 1992; 6:30 p.m. CST	@ Charlotte	W 114–103	Jordan (28)	Jordan (12)	Jordan (11)	Charlotte Coliseum; 23,698	20–7
28	December 30, 1992	@ Miami	W 105–100	Michael Jordan (39)	Horace Grant (9)	Jordan & Pippen (8)	Miami Arena; 15,008	21–7

January: 7–8 (home: 4–3; road: 3–5)

Game	Date	Team	Score	High points	High rebounds	High assists	Location Attendance	Record
29	January 2, 1993	Indiana	W 109–100	Michael Jordan (39)	Horace Grant (16)	Scottie Pippen (7)	Chicago Stadium; 18,676	22–7
30	January 5, 1993; 7:00 p.m. CST	L.A. Lakers	L 88–91	Jordan (36)	Cartwright, Pippen (7)	Jordan (5)	Chicago Stadium; 18,676	22–8
31	January 6, 1993; 6:30 p.m. CST	@ Cleveland	L 95–117	Pippen (24)	Pippen (9)	Jordan (3)	Richfield Coliseum; 20,273	22–9
32	January 8, 1993	Milwaukee Bucks	W 120–95	Michael Jordan (35)	Will Perdue (13)	Scottie Pippen (12)	Chicago Stadium; 18,676	23–9
33	January 9, 1993	@ Philadelphia	L 91–104	Michael Jordan (30)	Scottie Pippen (12)	Michael Jordan (6)	The Spectrum; 18,168	23–10
34	January 12, 1993	@ Orlando	W 122–106	Horace Grant (26)	Scottie Pippen (10)	Scottie Pippen (10)	Orlando Arena; 15,151	24–10
35	January 15, 1993	Golden State	W 122–101	Michael Jordan (26)	Michael Jordan (12)	Michael Jordan (10)	Chicago Stadium; 18,676	25–10
36	January 16, 1993	Orlando	L 124–128 (OT)	Michael Jordan (64)	Horace Grant (19)	Scottie Pippen (8)	Chicago Stadium; 18,676	25–11
37	January 18, 1993	Boston	W 103–93	Michael Jordan (29)	Horace Grant (12)	Scottie Pippen (8)	Chicago Stadium; 18,676	26–11
38	January 21, 1993; 6:30 p.m. CST	@ New Jersey	W 107–94	Jordan (30)	Grant (12)	Pippen (8)	Brendan Byrne Arena; 20,049	27–11
39	January 22, 1993; 7:30 p.m. CST	Charlotte	L 97–105	Jordan (28)	Grant (13)	Armstrong, Pippen (5)	Chicago Stadium; 18,676	27–12
40	January 24, 1993; 12 Noon CST	@ San Antonio	L 99–103	Jordan (42)	Jordan (11)	Pippen (6)	HemisFair Arena; 16,057	27–13
41	January 26, 1993	@ Dallas	W 123–88	King & Pippen (19)	King & Pippen (11)	Scottie Pippen (7)	Reunion Arena; 17,502	28–13
42	January 28, 1993; 7:30 p.m. CST	@ Houston	L 83–94	Jordan (26)	Pippen (8)	Pippen (7)	The Summit; 16,611	28–14
43	January 30, 1993	@ Denver	L 102–109	Michael Jordan (39)	Scott Williams (14)	B. J. Armstrong (6)	McNichols Sports Arena; 17,022	28–15

February: 10–2 (home: 4–2; road: 6–0)

Game	Date	Team	Score	High points	High rebounds	High assists	Location Attendance	Record
44	February 1, 1993; 7:00 p.m. CST	@ Utah	W 96–92	Jordan (37)	Grant (19)	Armstrong (4)	Delta Center; 19,911	29–15
45	February 3, 1993	@ Sacramento	W 107–88	Michael Jordan (36)	Horace Grant (11)	Scottie Pippen (9)	ARCO Arena; 17,317	30–15
46	February 4, 1993	@ L.A. Clippers	W 107–105 (OT)	Michael Jordan (33)	Horace Grant (14)	3 players tied (4)	Los Angeles Memorial Sports Arena; 15,989	31–15
47	February 7, 1993	@ Portland	W 101–91	Michael Jordan (34)	Horace Grant (13)	Scottie Pippen (7)	Memorial Coliseum; 12,888	32–15
48	February 10, 1993	@ Indiana	W 115–104	Michael Jordan (40)	Horace Grant (14)	Michael Jordan (8)	Market Square Arena; 16,530	33–15
49	February 12, 1993; 7:00 p.m. CST	New York	L 98–104	Pippen (35)	Grant (12)	Tucker (6)	Chicago Stadium; 18,676	33–16
50	February 13, 1993; 7:30 p.m. CST	Cleveland	L 111–116	Jordan, Pippen (25)	Grant, Perdue (8)	Armstrong, Jordan, Pippen (5)	Chicago Stadium; 18,676	33–17
51	February 15, 1993	Sacramento	W 119–101	Michael Jordan (32)	Scott Williams (12)	Michael Jordan (6)	Chicago Stadium; 18,237	34–17
52	February 17, 1993; 7:30 p.m. CST	Utah	W 114–96	Jordan (27)	Grant (9)	Pippen (7)	Chicago Stadium; 18,676	35–17
All-Star Break
53	February 23, 1993	Milwaukee	W 99–95	Michael Jordan (34)	Horace Grant (13)	Scottie Pippen (9)	Chicago Stadium; 18,197	36–17
54	February 25, 1993	@ Orlando	W 108–106	Michael Jordan (36)	Grant & Perdue (9)	Scottie Pippen (7)	Orlando Arena; 15,151	37–17
55	February 27, 1993	Atlanta	W 112–92	Michael Jordan (34)	Scott Williams (11)	Armstrong & Jordan (8)	Chicago Stadium; 18,676	38–17

March: 10–4 (home: 7–2; road: 3–2)

Game	Date	Team	Score	High points	High rebounds	High assists	Location Attendance	Record
56	March 2, 1993; 7:00 p.m. CST	@ New Jersey	W 87–80	Jordan (24)	Grant (11)	Jordan (8)	Brendan Byrne Arena; 20,049	39–17
57	March 3, 1993	Dallas	W 125–97	Scottie Pippen (24)	Scott Williams (8)	Trent Tucker (8)	Chicago Stadium; 18,062	40–17
58	March 5, 1993; 7:00 p.m. CST	San Antonio	L 102–107 (OT)	Pippen (39)	Pippen (13)	Pippen (10)	Chicago Stadium; 18,676	40–18
59	March 9, 1993; 7:30 p.m. CST	Seattle	W 86–83	Jordan (38)	Pippen (12)	Jordan (9)	Chicago Stadium; 18,531	41–18
60	March 11, 1993	@ Miami	L 95–97	Michael Jordan (29)	Scott Williams (9)	Michael Jordan (8)	Miami Arena; 15,008	41–19
61	March 12, 1993; 7:30 p.m. CST	Charlotte	W 123–108	Jordan (52)	Perdue (10)	Armstrong (7)	Chicago Stadium; 18,676	42–19
62	March 14, 1993	@ Detroit	L 99–101	Michael Jordan (28)	Scott Williams (10)	Jordan & Pippen (6)	The Palace of Auburn Hills; 21,454	42–20
63	March 15, 1993	L.A. Clippers	W 101–94	B. J. Armstrong (28)	Horace Grant (17)	B. J. Armstrong (7)	Chicago Stadium; 18,482	43–20
64	March 19, 1993	Washington	W 104–99	Michael Jordan (25)	Will Perdue (12)	Scottie Pippen (7)	Chicago Stadium; 18,676	44–20
65	March 20, 1993	@ Washington	W 126–101	Michael Jordan (47)	Michael Jordan (8)	Armstrong & Jordan (4)	Capital Centre; 18,756	45–20
66	March 23, 1993	Minnesota	W 107–100	Michael Jordan (34)	Scott Williams (13)	Michael Jordan (7)	Chicago Stadium; 18,676	46–20
67	March 24, 1993	@ Philadelphia	W 113–100	Michael Jordan (43)	Scottie Pippen (10)	Scottie Pippen (8)	The Spectrum; 18,168	47–20
68	March 26, 1993	Orlando	W 107–86	Scottie Pippen (20)	Scottie Pippen (13)	Scottie Pippen (8)	Chicago Stadium; 18,676	48–20
69	March 30, 1993; 7:00 p.m. CST	Phoenix	L 109–113	Jordan (44)	Grant (16)	Pippen (10)	Chicago Stadium; 18,676	48–21

April: 9–4 (home: 5–0; road: 4–4)

Game	Date	Team	Score	High points	High rebounds	High assists	Location Attendance	Record
70	April 2, 1993; 7:30 p.m. CST	New Jersey	W 118–105	Jordan (40)	Grant (11)	Pippen (8)	Chicago Stadium; 18,676	49–21
71	April 4, 1993	@ Boston	W 101–89	Michael Jordan (32)	Scottie Pippen (9)	Armstrong & Grant (4)	Boston Garden; 14,890	50–21
72	April 6, 1993	@ Milwaukee	L 109–113	Michael Jordan (30)	Scottie Pippen (11)	Scottie Pippen (8)	Bradley Center; 18,633	50–22
73	April 9, 1993	@ Atlanta	W 88–87	Michael Jordan (30)	Michael Jordan (12)	Armstrong & Jordan (4)	The Omni; 16,510	51–22
74	April 10, 1993	@ Indiana	W 92–87	B. J. Armstrong (27)	Horace Grant (14)	3 players tied (5)	Market Square Arena; 16,530	52–22
75	April 12, 1993	@ Detroit	W 98–95	Michael Jordan (23)	Horace Grant (11)	Horace Grant (7)	The Palace of Auburn Hills; 21,454	53–22
76	April 14, 1993	Miami	W 119–92	Michael Jordan (34)	Horace Grant (8)	John Paxson (8)	Chicago Stadium; 18,676	54–22
77	April 16, 1993	Milwaukee	W 119–105	Michael Jordan (47)	Jordan & Pippen (7)	John Paxson (8)	Chicago Stadium; 18,676	55–22
78	April 18, 1993; 4:30 p.m. CDT	@ Cleveland	L 94–103	Jordan (32)	Grant (9)	Jordan (9)	Richfield Coliseum; 20,273	55–23
79	April 20, 1993	Philadelphia	W 123–94	Michael Jordan (28)	Scott Williams (10)	B. J. Armstrong (14)	Chicago Stadium; 18,676	56–23
80	April 22, 1993	Detroit	W 109–103 (OT)	Michael Jordan (36)	Scottie Pippen (13)	Scottie Pippen (8)	Chicago Stadium; 18,676	57–23
81	April 23, 1993; 7:00 p.m. CDT	@ Charlotte	L 103–104	Jordan (38)	Grant, King, Pippen, Williams (6)	Grant, Pippen (5)	Charlotte Coliseum; 23,698	57–24
82	April 25, 1993; 12 Noon CDT	@ New York	L 84–89	Michael Jordan (21)	Scott Williams (9)	Michael Jordan (7)	Madison Square Garden; 19,763	57–25

1992–93 schedule

=== Playoffs ===
1993 playoff game log
Total: 15–4 (Home: 8–2; Road: 7–2)
First Round: 3–0 (home: 2–0; road: 1–0)

Game	Date	Team	Score	High points	High rebounds	High assists	Location Attendance	Series
1	April 30, 1993	Atlanta	W 114–90	Michael Jordan (35)	Horace Grant (10)	Trent Tucker (7)	Chicago Stadium; 18,676	1–0
2	May 2, 1993	Atlanta	W 117–102	Michael Jordan (29)	Horace Grant (8)	John Paxson (7)	Chicago Stadium; 18,676	2–0
3	May 4, 1993	@ Atlanta	W 98–88	Michael Jordan (39)	Horace Grant (9)	B. J. Armstrong (6)	The Omni; 15,141	3–0

Eastern Conference Semifinals: 4–0 (home: 2–0; road: 2–0)

Game	Date	Team	Score	High points	High rebounds	High assists	Location Attendance	Series
1	May 11, 1993; 7:00 p.m. CDT	Cleveland	W 91–84	Jordan (43)	Cartwright, Williams (10)	Jordan, Pippen (4)	Chicago Stadium; 18,676	1–0
2	May 13, 1993; 7:00 p.m. CDT	Cleveland	W 104–85	Grant (20)	Williams (10)	Pippen (7)	Chicago Stadium; 18,676	2–0
3	May 15, 1993; 2:30 p.m. CDT	@ Cleveland	W 96–90	Jordan (32)	Pippen (9)	Pippen (6)	Richfield Coliseum; 20,273	3–0
4	May 17, 1993; 7:00 p.m. CDT	@ Cleveland	W 103–101	Jordan (31)	Grant (10)	Jordan (6)	Richfield Coliseum; 20,274	4–0

Eastern Conference Finals: 4–2 (home: 3–0; road: 1–2)

Game	Date	Team	Score	High points	High rebounds	High assists	Location Attendance	Series
1	May 23, 1993; 2:30 p.m. CDT	@ New York	L 90–98	Jordan (27)	Grant (8)	Jordan (5)	Madison Square Garden; 19,763	0–1
2	May 25, 1993; 7:00 p.m. CDT	@ New York	L 91–96	Jordan (36)	Jordan (9)	Pippen, Williams (4)	Madison Square Garden; 19,763	0–2
3	May 29, 1993; 2:30 p.m. CDT	New York	W 103–83	Pippen (29)	Jordan (8)	Jordan (11)	Chicago Stadium; 18,676	1–2
4	May 31, 1993; 2:30 p.m. CDT	New York	W 105–95	Jordan (54)	Pippen (7)	Pippen (4)	Chicago Stadium; 18,676	2–2
5	June 2, 1993; 8:00 p.m. CDT	@ New York	W 97–94	Jordan (29)	Pippen (11)	Jordan (14)	Madison Square Garden; 19,763	3–2
6	June 4, 1993; 8:00 p.m. CDT	New York	W 96–88	Jordan (25)	Grant (11)	Jordan (9)	Chicago Stadium; 18,676	4–2

NBA Finals: 4–2 (home: 1–2; road: 3–0)

Game	Date	Team	Score	High points	High rebounds	High assists	Location Attendance	Series
1	June 9, 1993; 8:00 p.m. CDT	@ Phoenix	W 100–92	Jordan (31)	Williams (10)	Armstrong, Grant, Jordan, Pippen (5)	America West Arena; 19,023	1–0
2	June 11, 1993; 8:00 p.m. CDT	@ Phoenix	W 111–108	Jordan (42)	Jordan, Pippen (12)	Pippen (12)	America West Arena; 19,023	2–0
3	June 13, 1993; 6:00 p.m. CDT	Phoenix	L 121–129 (3OT)	Jordan (44)	Grant (17)	Pippen (9)	Chicago Stadium; 18,676	2–1
4	June 16, 1993; 8:00 p.m. CDT	Phoenix	W 111–105	Jordan (55)	Grant (16)	Pippen (10)	Chicago Stadium; 18,676	3–1
5	June 18, 1993; 8:00 p.m. CDT	Phoenix	L 98–108	Jordan (41)	Grant, Jordan (7)	Jordan (7)	Chicago Stadium; 18,676	3–2
6	June 20, 1993; 8:00 p.m. CDT	@ Phoenix	W 99–98	Jordan (33)	Pippen (12)	Jordan (7)	America West Arena; 19,023	4–2

1993 schedule

== Player stats ==
Legend
GP	Games played	GS	Games started	MPG	Minutes per game
FG%	Field-goal percentage	3P%	3-point field-goal percentage	FT%	Free-throw percentage
RPG	Rebounds per game	APG	Assists per game	SPG	Steals per game
BPG	Blocks per game	PPG	Points per game

=== Regular season ===
Player	GP	GS	MPG	FG%	3P%	FT%	RPG	APG	SPG	BPG	PPG
B. J. Armstrong	82	74	30.4	.499	.446	.861	1.8	4.0	.80	.07	12.3
Ricky Blanton	2	0	6.5	.429	.000	.000	1.5	.5	1.00	.00	3.0
Bill Cartwright	63	63	19.9	.411	.000	.735	3.7	1.3	.32	.16	5.6
Joe Courtney	5	0	6.8	.444	.000	.750	.4	.2	.40	.20	2.2
Jo Jo English	6	0	5.2	.300	.000	.000	1.0	.2	.50	.33	1.0
Horace Grant	77	77	35.6	.508	.200	.619	9.5	2.6	1.16	1.25	13.2
Michael Jordan	78	78	39.3	.495	.352	.837	6.7	5.5	2.83	.78	32.6
Stacey King	76	3	13.9	.471	.333	.705	2.7	.9	.34	.26	5.4
Rodney McCray	64	5	15.9	.451	.400	.692	2.5	1.3	.19	.23	3.5
Ed Nealy	11	0	7.2	.435	.200	1.000	1.5	.2	.27	.09	2.1
John Paxson	59	8	17.5	.451	.463	.850	.8	2.3	.64	.03	4.2
Will Perdue	72	16	13.9	.557	.000	.604	4.0	1.0	.31	.65	4.7
Scottie Pippen	81	81	38.6	.473	.237	.663	7.7	6.3	2.14	.90	18.6
Trent Tucker	69	0	13.2	.485	.405	.818	1.0	1.2	.35	.09	5.2
Darrell Walker	28	0	13.1	.403	.000	.500	1.4	1.6	.82	.07	2.6
Corey Williams	35	0	6.9	.365	.333	.818	.9	.7	.11	.06	2.3
Scott Williams	71	5	19.3	.466	.000	.714	6.4	1.0	.77	.93	5.9

=== Playoffs ===
Player	GP	GS	MPG	FG%	3P%	FT%	RPG	APG	SPG	BPG	PPG
B. J. Armstrong	19		33.8	.524	.512	.909	1.5	3.3	1.00	.11	11.4
Bill Cartwright	19		23.4	.465	.000	.778	4.5	1.5	.58	.16	6.3
Horace Grant	19		34.3	.546	.000	.685	8.2	2.3	1.21	1.21	10.7
Michael Jordan	19		41.2	.475	.389	.805	6.7	6.0	2.05	.89	35.1
Stacey King	19		12.1	.394	.000	.806	2.1	.7	.47	.21	4.1
Rodney McCray	7		5.6	.167	.000	.000	1.9	.7	.00	.14	.3
John Paxson	19		17.4	.583	.625	.727	1.0	1.7	.32	.05	4.9
Will Perdue	13		7.8	.500	.000	.500	2.3	.4	.08	.15	1.9
Scottie Pippen	19		41.5	.465	.176	.638	6.9	5.6	2.16	.68	20.1
Trent Tucker	19		10.9	.413	.462	.500	.9	1.0	.37	.00	2.8
Darrell Walker	9		2.4	.250	.000	.667	.1	.6	.00	.00	.4
Scott Williams	19		20.8	.506	.000	.552	5.8	1.4	.37	.89	5.5

Player statistics citation:

== NBA Finals ==
The 1993 NBA Finals was the championship round of the 1992–93 NBA season, featuring the Chicago Bulls, led by Michael Jordan, and the Phoenix Suns, winners of 62 games and led by regular season MVP Charles Barkley. The Bulls became the first team since the legendary Boston Celtics of the 1960s to win three consecutive championship titles, clinching the "three-peat" with John Paxson's game-winning 3-pointer that gave them a 99–98 victory in Game 6. The road team won five of the six games, with Chicago winning at home in Game 4, 111–105.

- The Phoenix Suns won game 3 in 3OT, 129–121. Suns Head Coach Paul Westphal was the only person to appear in both triple-overtime NBA finals games. The first was the classic 1976 contest against Boston, in Game 5 as a player. His Suns also played in that year's finals, thus becoming the only team to appear in two triple-overtime finals games. Back in 1976, the Suns lost 126–128 against Boston.
- The Bulls got off to a good start in Game 6 but struggled in the fourth quarter, wasting a double-digit lead to trail 98–94. Michael Jordan made a layup to cut the margin to 2 points, and the Suns missed a shot on their next possession. Trailing 98–96 and facing a Game 7 on the road if they lost that day, John Paxson took a pass from Horace Grant and buried a three-point shot with 3.9 seconds left, giving the Bulls a 99–98 lead. The victory was secured by a last-second block from Horace Grant.
- Michael Jordan, who averaged a Finals-record 41.0 points per game during the six-game series, became the first player in NBA history to win three straight Finals MVP Awards. He joined Magic Johnson as the only other player to win the award three times. The NBA started awarding the Finals MVP in 1969.

(W1) Phoenix Suns vs. (E2) Chicago Bulls: Bulls win series 4–2

- Game 1 @ America West Arena, Phoenix (June 9): Chicago 100, Phoenix 92
- Game 2 @ America West Arena, Phoenix (June 11): Chicago 111, Phoenix 108
- Game 3 @ Chicago Stadium, Chicago (June 13): Phoenix 129, Chicago 121 (3OT)
- Game 4 @ Chicago Stadium, Chicago (June 16): Chicago 111, Phoenix 105
- Game 5 @ Chicago Stadium, Chicago (June 18): Phoenix 108, Chicago 98
- Game 6 @ America West Arena, Phoenix (June 20): Chicago 99, Phoenix 98

== 1993 NBA Finals roster ==
=== 1993 Chicago Bulls ===
Head Coach:Phil Jackson
Michael Jordan | Scottie Pippen | Horace Grant | B. J. Armstrong | Scott Williams | Bill Cartwright | Stacey King | Trent Tucker | John Paxson | Will Perdue | Rodney McCray | Ricky Blanton | Darrell Walker | Corey Williams | Jo Jo English |

=== 1993 Phoenix Suns ===
Head Coach:Paul Westphal
Charles Barkley | Dan Majerle | Kevin Johnson | Tom Chambers | Danny Ainge | Richard Dumas | Negele Knight | Oliver Miller | Mark West | Jerrod Mustaf | Frank Johnson | Tim Kempton |

== Award winners ==
- Michael Jordan, Associated Press Athlete of the Year
- Michael Jordan, All-NBA First Team
- Scottie Pippen, All-NBA Third Team
- Michael Jordan, NBA Finals Most Valuable Player Award
- Michael Jordan, NBA All-Defensive First Team
- Scottie Pippen, NBA All-Defensive First Team
- Horace Grant, NBA All-Defensive Second Team

=== NBA All-Star Game ===
- Michael Jordan, Guard
- Scottie Pippen, Forward
