= Trent Tucker =

American basketball player (born 1959)

Personal information
- Born: December 20, 1959 (age 66) Tarboro, North Carolina, U.S.
- Listed height: 6 ft 5 in (1.96 m)
- Listed weight: 193 lb (88 kg)

Career information
- High school: Flint Northwestern (Flint, Michigan)
- College: Minnesota (1978–1982)
- NBA draft: 1982: 1st round, 6th overall pick
- Drafted by: New York Knicks
- Playing career: 1982–1993
- Position: Shooting guard
- Number: 32, 6

Career history
- 1982–1991: New York Knicks
- 1992: San Antonio Spurs
- 1992–1993: Chicago Bulls

Career highlights
- NBA champion (1993); Second-team All-Big Ten (1982); No. 32 retired by Minnesota Golden Gophers

Career statistics
- Points: 6,236 (8.2 ppg)
- Rebounds: 1,520 (2.0 rpg)
- Assists: 1,532 (2.0 apg)
- Stats at NBA.com
- Stats at Basketball Reference

Kelvin Trent Tucker (born December 20, 1959) is an American former professional basketball player who played eleven seasons in the National Basketball Association (NBA).

A 6 ft 5 in (1.96 m) shooting guard, Tucker attended the University of Minnesota from 1978 to 1982, leading them to a Big Ten Conference championship in his senior year. He was then selected by the New York Knicks with the 6th overall pick of the 1982 NBA draft. On 30 November 1982, in his NBA debut, Tucker outscored the opposing Utah Jazz 17–11 in the third quarter. One of the earliest three-point specialists, Tucker represented the Knicks in the first ever Three-point Shootout (1986), making it to the semifinals before being outpaced by Craig Hodges and eventual winner Larry Bird. Tucker would play nine seasons with the Knicks before joining the San Antonio Spurs in 1991, and after one season with the Spurs he joined the Chicago Bulls, who won the 1993 NBA Championship. He retired after that season, having tallied 6,237 career points and 1,532 career assists.

== Personal life ==
Trent Tucker is married to Malina Anderson and they have had two kids, William and James. James in particular is a very good player for his age, and has even been reportedly accepted into Shattuck-St. Mary’s, a prestigious high school with an Illustrious hockey program. Both play hockey. The family lives in Eden Prairie, Minnesota.

== NBA career statistics ==
Legend
GP	Games played	GS	Games started	MPG	Minutes per game
FG%	Field goal percentage	3P%	3-point field goal percentage	FT%	Free throw percentage
RPG	Rebounds per game	APG	Assists per game	SPG	Steals per game
BPG	Blocks per game	PPG	Points per game	**Bold**	Career high
†	Won an NBA championship

=== Regular season ===
Year	Team	GP	GS	MPG	FG%	3P%	FT%	RPG	APG	SPG	BPG	PPG
1982–83	New York	78	**59**	23.5	.462	**.467**	.672	**2.8**	2.5	.7	.1	8.4
1983–84	New York	63	21	19.5	**.500**	.375	.758	2.1	2.2	1.0	.1	7.6
1984–85	New York	77	46	23.6	.483	.403	.792	2.4	**2.6**	1.0	**.2**	8.5
1985–86	New York	77	23	23.2	.472	.451	.790	2.2	2.5	.8	.1	10.6
1986–87	New York	70	15	**24.2**	.470	.422	.762	1.9	2.4	**1.7**	**.2**	**11.4**
1987–88	New York	71	4	17.6	.424	.413	.718	1.7	1.6	.7	.1	7.1
1988–89	New York	**81**	24	22.5	.454	.399	.782	2.2	1.6	1.1	.1	8.5
1989–90	New York	**81**	2	21.3	.417	.388	.767	2.1	2.1	.9	.1	8.2
1990–91	New York	65	13	18.4	.440	.418	.630	1.6	1.7	.7	.1	7.1
1991–92	San Antonio	24	0	17.3	.465	.396	.800	1.5	1.1	.9	.1	6.5
1992–93†	Chicago	69	0	13.2	.485	.397	**.818**	1.0	1.2	.3	.1	5.2
Career		756	207	20.7	.461	.408	.754	2.0	2.0	.9	.1	8.2

=== Playoffs ===
Year	Team	GP	GS	MPG	FG%	3P%	FT%	RPG	APG	SPG	BPG	PPG
1983	New York	6	—	14.2	**.600**	**.500**	.700	1.5	.8	.3	.0	4.3
1984	New York	12	—	21.2	.500	.200	.600	1.5	2.3	.9	**.3**	7.6
1988	New York	4	0	17.8	.421	.462	.750	.5	1.0	.8	.0	6.3
1989	New York	9	0	17.7	.466	.469	.500	2.1	1.6	**1.1**	.2	7.9
1990	New York	10	0	17.8	.400	.370	**1.000**	1.4	2.0	1.0	.0	4.7
1991	New York	3	**2**	**22.0**	.360	.400	**1.000**	**4.0**	**3.0**	.3	.0	**8.0**
1992	San Antonio	3	0	12.7	.429	.200	**1.000**	1.0	.7	.0	.0	4.7
1993†	Chicago	**19**	0	10.9	.413	.462	.500	.9	1.0	.4	.0	2.8
Career		66	2	16.0	.449	.417	.698	1.4	1.5	.7	.1	5.5

== The "Trent Tucker Rule" ==
On January 15, 1990, when Tucker was with New York, with 0.1 of a second remaining in a game against the Chicago Bulls, he got off a wild three-point shot before the buzzer and made the basket. The shot counted and the Knicks won. Bulls' coach Phil Jackson vociferously complained following the game, arguing that it was not physically possible to catch and shoot in 0.1 seconds. While the Bulls' protest failed, the NBA subsequently added a rule which states that at least 0.3 seconds needs to be on the clock in order for a player to get a shot off whether they make it or not. Inside of 0.3 seconds, only a tip-in or a high lob would count.

== Post-playing career ==
After retiring, Tucker worked as a broadcast analyst for Minnesota Timberwolves basketball games. He currently works for KFAN radio. Tucker has also been an active philanthropist; he founded the Trent Tucker Non-Profit Organization in 1998. On April 15, 2013, Trent began his duties as Director of District Athletics for the Minneapolis, MN Public School District.

Tucker, however, resigned from his post as Director of District Athletics for the Minneapolis, MN Public School District on February 9, 2018, after "he didn’t see eye-to-eye with new district leadership."

== See also ==
- List of National Basketball Association career 3-point field goal percentage leaders
