= 1993 NBA Finals =

1993 basketball championship series

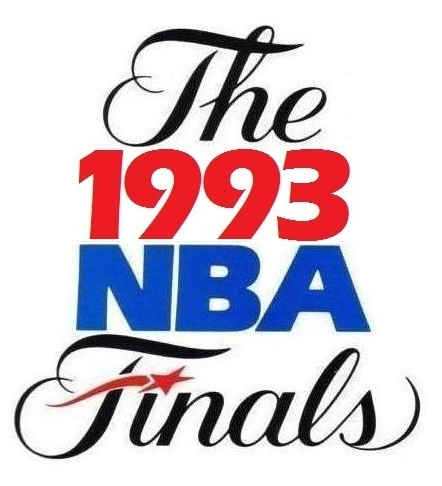
Team	Coach	Wins
Chicago Bulls	Phil Jackson	4
Phoenix Suns	Paul Westphal	2
- Dates: June 9–20
- MVP: Michael Jordan (Chicago Bulls)
- Hall of Famers: Bulls: Michael Jordan (2009); Scottie Pippen (2010); Suns: Charles Barkley (2006); Coaches: Phil Jackson (2007); Paul Westphal (2019, player); Tex Winter (2011); Officials: Dick Bavetta (2015); Hugh Evans (2022); Darell Garretson (2016)
- Eastern finals: Bulls defeated Knicks, 4–2
- Western finals: Suns defeated SuperSonics, 4–3

The 1993 NBA Finals was the championship series of the National Basketball Association's (NBA) 1992–93 season, and the conclusion of the season's playoffs. It featured the two-time defending NBA champion and Eastern Conference champion Chicago Bulls, led by Michael Jordan, and the Western Conference champion Phoenix Suns, winners of 62 games and led by regular season MVP Charles Barkley.

The Bulls became the first team since the Boston Celtics of the 1960s to win three consecutive championship titles, clinching the "three-peat" with John Paxson's game-winning 3-pointer that gave them a 99–98 victory in Game 6.

== Background ==
=== Chicago Bulls ===
With two consecutive NBA championships, the Bulls aimed at an elusive "three-peat". No team had won a third consecutive NBA title since the Boston Celtics won eight in a row from 1959 to 1966.

In the off-season, Michael Jordan and Scottie Pippen played for the Dream Team at the 1992 Barcelona Olympics, winning the gold medal. They entered the new season with little rest, but that did not stop them from leading the Bulls to a 57–25 record, good for second in the Eastern Conference.

Chicago began its push for a three-peat with back-to-back sweeps of the Atlanta Hawks and Cleveland Cavaliers. But against the top-seeded New York Knicks, the Bulls fell behind 2–0 before winning the next two games in Chicago, tying the series. In Game 5 at Madison Square Garden, the Bulls stole a rare road victory, aided by an array of blocks on Charles Smith in the final seconds, before wrapping up the series in Game 6 at Chicago Stadium.

=== Phoenix Suns ===
The Suns were a team on the rise, led by their All-Star point guard Kevin Johnson. Johnson arrived via trade in 1988, and propelled the Suns to two consecutive trips to the conference finals in his first two full seasons.

In the 1992 off-season, the Suns made a blockbuster trade, acquiring Charles Barkley from the Philadelphia 76ers in exchange for Jeff Hornacek, Tim Perry, and Andrew Lang. They also promoted assistant coach Paul Westphal to head coach, unveiled new logos and uniforms, and moved from Arizona Veterans Memorial Coliseum to the brand-new America West Arena.

The Suns made the most of these moves, winning a franchise record 62 games. Barkley's efforts won him the MVP award. In the first round of the Western Conference playoffs, the Suns fell down 2–0 to the Los Angeles Lakers before rallying to defeat them in five games. In the second round the Suns defeated the San Antonio Spurs in six games, and in the conference finals they beat the Seattle SuperSonics in seven. It was the Suns' second NBA finals appearance since 1976.

=== Road to the Finals ===
Phoenix Suns (Western Conference champion)
Chicago Bulls (Eastern Conference champion)

#	Western Conference				
#	Team	W	L	PCT	GB
1	z-Phoenix Suns	62	20	.756	–
2	y-Houston Rockets	55	27	.671	7
3	x-Seattle SuperSonics	55	27	.671	7
4	x-Portland Trail Blazers	51	31	.622	11
5	x-San Antonio Spurs	49	33	.598	13
6	x-Utah Jazz	47	35	.573	15
7	x-Los Angeles Clippers	41	41	.500	21
8	x-Los Angeles Lakers	39	43	.476	23
9	Denver Nuggets	36	46	.439	26
10	Golden State Warriors	34	48	.415	28
11	Sacramento Kings	25	57	.305	37
12	Minnesota Timberwolves	19	63	.232	43
13	Dallas Mavericks	11	71	.134	51

1st seed in the West, best league record
Regular season

#	Eastern Conference				
#	Team	W	L	PCT	GB
1	c-New York Knicks	60	22	.732	–
2	y-Chicago Bulls	57	25	.695	3
3	x-Cleveland Cavaliers	54	28	.659	6
4	x-Boston Celtics	48	34	.585	12
5	x-Charlotte Hornets	44	38	.537	16
6	x-New Jersey Nets	43	39	.524	17
7	x-Atlanta Hawks	43	39	.524	17
8	x-Indiana Pacers	41	41	.500	19
9	Orlando Magic	41	41	.500	19
10	Detroit Pistons	40	42	.488	20
11	Miami Heat	36	46	.439	24
12	Milwaukee Bucks	28	54	.341	32
13	Philadelphia 76ers	26	56	.317	36
14	Washington Bullets	22	60	.268	38

2nd seed in the East, 3rd best league record
Defeated the (8) Los Angeles Lakers, 3–2
First round
Defeated the (7) Atlanta Hawks, 3–0
Defeated the (5) San Antonio Spurs, 4–2
Conference semifinals
Defeated the (3) Cleveland Cavaliers, 4–0
Defeated the (3) Seattle SuperSonics, 4–3
Conference finals
Defeated the (1) New York Knicks, 4–2

=== Regular season series ===
Both teams split the two meetings, each won by the road team:

November 22, 1992

Chicago Bulls 128, Phoenix Suns 111

America West Arena, Phoenix, Arizona

March 30, 1993

Phoenix Suns 113, Chicago Bulls 109

Chicago Stadium, Chicago, Illinois

== Team rosters ==
=== Chicago Bulls ===
1992–93 Chicago Bulls roster
Players

Pos.	No.	Player	Height	Weight	DOB	From
PG	10	B. J. Armstrong	6 ft 2 in (1.88 m)	175 lb (79 kg)	1967–09–09	Iowa
C	24	Bill Cartwright	7 ft 1 in (2.16 m)	245 lb (111 kg)	1957–07–30	San Francisco
PF	54	Horace Grant	6 ft 10 in (2.08 m)	245 lb (111 kg)	1965–07–04	Clemson
SG	23	Michael Jordan	6 ft 6 in (1.98 m)	215 lb (98 kg)	1963–02–17	North Carolina
PF	21	Stacey King	6 ft 11 in (2.11 m)	230 lb (104 kg)	1967–01–29	Oklahoma
SF	22	Rodney McCray	6 ft 7 in (2.01 m)	220 lb (100 kg)	1961–08–29	Louisville
PF	45	Ed Nealy	6 ft 7 in (2.01 m)	238 lb (108 kg)	1960–02–19	Kansas State
PG	5	John Paxson	6 ft 2 in (1.88 m)	185 lb (84 kg)	1960–09–29	Notre Dame
C	32	Will Perdue	7 ft 0 in (2.13 m)	240 lb (109 kg)	1965–08–29	Vanderbilt
SF	33	Scottie Pippen	6 ft 7 in (2.01 m)	220 lb (100 kg)	1965–09–25	Central Arkansas
SG	6	Trent Tucker	6 ft 5 in (1.96 m)	193 lb (88 kg)	1959–12–20	Minnesota
SG	20	Darrell Walker	6 ft 4 in (1.93 m)	180 lb (82 kg)	1961–03–09	Arkansas
PG	12	Corey Williams	6 ft 2 in (1.88 m)	190 lb (86 kg)	1970–04–24	Oklahoma State
PF	42	Scott Williams	6 ft 10 in (2.08 m)	230 lb (104 kg)	1968–03–21	North Carolina

Coaches
Head coach
- Phil Jackson
Assistant(s)
- Johnny Bach
- Jim Cleamons
- Tex Winter

Legend
- (DP) Unsigned draft pick
- (FA) Free agent
- (S) Suspended
- Injured

=== Phoenix Suns ===
1992–93 Phoenix Suns roster
Players

Pos.	No.	Player	Height	Weight	DOB	From
SG	22	Danny Ainge	6 ft 4 in (1.93 m)	175 lb (79 kg)	1959–03–17	BYU
PF	34	Charles Barkley	6 ft 6 in (1.98 m)	252 lb (114 kg)	1963–02–20	Auburn
SF	23	Cedric Ceballos	6 ft 6 in (1.98 m)	190 lb (86 kg)	1969–08–02	Cal State Fullerton
PF	24	Tom Chambers	6 ft 10 in (2.08 m)	220 lb (100 kg)	1959–06–21	Utah
SF	21	Richard Dumas	6 ft 7 in (2.01 m)	200 lb (91 kg)	1969–05–19	Oklahoma State
PG	3	Frank Johnson	6 ft 1 in (1.85 m)	185 lb (84 kg)	1958–11–23	Wake Forest
PG	7	Kevin Johnson	6 ft 1 in (1.85 m)	180 lb (82 kg)	1966–03–04	California
C	8	Tim Kempton	6 ft 10 in (2.08 m)	245 lb (111 kg)	1964–01–25	Notre Dame
PG	32	Negele Knight	6 ft 1 in (1.85 m)	175 lb (79 kg)	1967–03–06	Dayton
SG	9	Dan Majerle	6 ft 6 in (1.98 m)	215 lb (98 kg)	1965–09–09	Central Michigan
C	25	Oliver Miller	6 ft 9 in (2.06 m)	280 lb (127 kg)	1970–04–06	Arkansas
PF	0	Jerrod Mustaf	6 ft 10 in (2.08 m)	238 lb (108 kg)	1969–10–28	Maryland
C	41	Mark West	6 ft 10 in (2.08 m)	230 lb (104 kg)	1960–11–05	Old Dominion

Coaches
Head coach
- Paul Westphal
Assistant(s)
- Scotty Robertson
- Lionel Hollins

Legend
- (DP) Unsigned draft pick
- (FA) Free agent
- (S) Suspended
- Injured

== Series summary ==
Game	Date	Road team	Result	Home team
Game 1	June 9	Chicago Bulls	100–92 (1–0)	Phoenix Suns
Game 2	June 11	Chicago Bulls	111–108 (2–0)	Phoenix Suns
Game 3	June 13	Phoenix Suns	129–121 (3OT) (1–2)	Chicago Bulls
Game 4	June 16	Phoenix Suns	105–111 (1–3)	Chicago Bulls
Game 5	June 18	Phoenix Suns	108–98 (2–3)	Chicago Bulls
Game 6	June 20	Chicago Bulls	99–98 (4–2)	Phoenix Suns

=== Game 1 ===
NBC

June 9
9:00et

Chicago Bulls 100, Phoenix Suns 92
Scoring by quarter: 34–20, 18–21, 21–28, 27–23
Pts: Michael Jordan 31; Rebs: Scott Williams 10; Asts: Armstrong, Grant, Jordan, Pippen 5 each	Pts: Charles Barkley 21; Rebs: Richard Dumas 12; Asts: Charles Barkley 5
Chicago leads the series, 1–0

America West Arena, Phoenix, Arizona
Attendance: 19,023
Referees:
- No. 25 Hugh Evans
- No. 20 Jess Kersey
- No. 42 Hue Hollins

Phoenix displayed an introduction animation in the vein of Chicago's well-known intro animation, set to the same song, before the game, which was remarked upon by the commentators. Before the game, a moment of silence was observed in memory of New Jersey Nets guard Dražen Petrović, who had been killed in a car crash two days earlier. The Bulls led the game from start to finish, and were able to quell several rallies from the Suns throughout.

=== Game 2 ===
NBC

June 11
9:00et

Chicago Bulls 111, Phoenix Suns 108
Scoring by quarter: 28–29, 31–24, 28–31, 24–24
Pts: Michael Jordan 42; Rebs: Jordan, Pippen 12 each Asts: Scottie Pippen 12	Pts: Charles Barkley 42; Rebs: Charles Barkley 13; Asts: Kevin Johnson 7
Chicago leads the series, 2–0

America West Arena, Phoenix, Arizona
Attendance: 19,023
Referees:
- No. 11 Jake O'Donnell
- No. 17 Joey Crawford
- No. 14 Jack Madden

Both teams were locked in battle throughout the first half until Chicago took over in the 2nd quarter, shooting with a higher shooting percentage. In the second half, the Suns began to pressure the Bulls, but ran into trouble when Kevin Johnson fouled out, and Charles Barkley suffered an elbow injury. Late in the 4th quarter with time running out, it came down to a battle of determination. Scottie Pippen blocked Danny Ainge's 3-point attempt to seal the win and Phoenix became the first team to lose their home-court advantage twice in the first two games of the NBA Finals (the Orlando Magic did this two years later).

=== Game 3 ===
NBC

June 13
7:00et

Phoenix Suns 129, Chicago Bulls 121 (3OT)
Scoring by quarter: 29–29, 29–28, 28–28, 17–18, Overtime: 4–4, 7–7, 15–7
Pts: Dan Majerle 28; Rebs: Charles Barkley 19; Asts: Kevin Johnson 9	Pts: Michael Jordan 44; Rebs: Horace Grant 17; Asts: Scottie Pippen 9
Chicago leads the series, 2–1

Chicago Stadium, Chicago
Attendance: 18,676
Referees:
- No. 10 Darell Garretson
- No. 13 Mike Mathis
- No. 27 Dick Bavetta

The Phoenix Suns won Game 3 in triple overtime, 129–121. Horace Grant hits the game-tying 3-point play with 1:33 left in regulation to force the first OT; Tom Chambers hits the game-tying layup with 50.9 seconds left in the first OT to force the second OT; Dan Majerle hits the game-tying shot with 3.2 seconds left in the second OT to force the third OT. Suns Head Coach Paul Westphal became the only person to appear in two triple-overtime finals games: the first was the classic 1976 Game 5 contest against Boston as a player. His Suns also became the only team to appear in two triple-overtime finals games, the first of which they lost 126–128. Westphal made a surprising move that paid off, helping to get Kevin Johnson back on track after Johnson played terribly in Games 1 and 2, by having him guard Michael Jordan. KJ played much better basketball for the rest of the Finals.

Suns: Kevin Johnson 25, Dan Majerle 28, Charles Barkley 24, Mark West 11, Richard Dumas 17, Danny Ainge 10, Tom Chambers 12, Oliver Miller 2, Frank Johnson 0, Jerrod Mustaf 0

Bulls: B. J. Armstrong 21, Michael Jordan 44, Scottie Pippen 26, Horace Grant 13, Bill Cartwright 8, Scott Williams 4, Trent Tucker 3, Stacey King 0, John Paxson 2, Darrell Walker 0

=== Game 4 ===
NBC

June 16
9:00et

Phoenix Suns 105, Chicago Bulls 111
Scoring by quarter: 27–31, 31–30, 23–25, 24–25
Pts: Charles Barkley 32; Rebs: Charles Barkley 12; Asts: Charles Barkley 10	Pts: Michael Jordan 55; Rebs: Horace Grant 16; Asts: Scottie Pippen 10
Chicago leads the series, 3–1

Chicago Stadium, Chicago
Attendance: 18,676
Referees:
- No. 25 Hugh Evans
- No. 4 Ed T. Rush
- No. 21 Bill Oakes

In Game 4, Michael Jordan was unstoppable, scoring 55 points at Chicago Stadium and making a tough driving layup late in the game while getting fouled. The Bulls won 111–105. Scott Williams, who like MJ played his college basketball at UNC for Dean Smith, joked afterwards about "being proud that the two former Tar Heels combined for 57 points."

Suns: Charles Barkley 32, Dan Majerle 14, Kevin Johnson 19, Richard Dumas 17, Mark West 8, Tom Chambers 7, Danny Ainge 2, Oliver Miller 2, Frank Johnson 4

Bulls: Michael Jordan 55, Scottie Pippen 14, Horace Grant 17, B. J. Armstrong 11, Bill Cartwright 3, John Paxson 6, Scott Williams 2, Stacey King 3, Rodney McCray 0, Darrell Walker 0, Trent Tucker 0

=== Game 5 ===
NBC

June 18
9:00et

Phoenix Suns 108, Chicago Bulls 98
Scoring by quarter: 33–21, 21–28, 26–24, 28–25
Pts: Johnson, Dumas 25 each Rebs: Dan Majerle 12; Asts: Kevin Johnson 8	Pts: Michael Jordan 41; Rebs: Grant, Jordan 7 each Asts: Michael Jordan 7
Chicago leads the series, 3–2

Chicago Stadium, Chicago
Attendance: 18,676
Referees:
- No. 11 Jake O'Donnell
- No. 17 Joey Crawford
- No. 20 Jess Kersey

Before Game 5, Charles Barkley told the press he had announced to his teammates that they needed to win to "Save the City", a reference to the riots anticipated in Chicago if the Bulls won the championship at home. Both Paul Westphal and Kevin Johnson later expressed amusement about Barkley taking credit for the line because Westphal had made a tongue-in-cheek comment to that effect in a pregame meeting. Regardless, the Suns did save the city.

The Suns won 108–98 and headed home for Game 6 down 3–2.

Suns: Dan Majerle 11, Charles Barkley 24, Kevin Johnson 25, Mark West 5, Richard Dumas 25, Danny Ainge 8, Oliver Miller 8, Frank Johnson 2, Tom Chambers 0, Jerrod Mustaf 0

Bulls: Michael Jordan 41, Scottie Pippen 22, Horace Grant 1, B. J. Armstrong 7, Bill Cartwright 2, John Paxson 12, Scott Williams 4, Stacey King 4, Will Perdue 0, Trent Tucker 5, Darrell Walker 0

=== Game 6 ===
NBC

June 20
7:30et

Chicago Bulls 99, Phoenix Suns 98
Scoring by quarter: 37–28, 19–23, 31–28, 12–19
Pts: Michael Jordan 33; Rebs: Scottie Pippen 12; Asts: Michael Jordan 7	Pts: Barkley, Majerle 21 each Rebs: Charles Barkley 17; Asts: Kevin Johnson 10
Chicago wins the NBA Finals, 4–2

America West Arena, Phoenix, Arizona
Attendance: 19,023
Referees:
- No. 10 Darell Garretson
- No. 4 Ed T. Rush
- No. 13 Mike Mathis

The Bulls got off to a good start in Game 6 but struggled in the fourth quarter, squandering a double-digit lead to trail 98–94. Michael Jordan made a layup to cut the lead to 2 points, and Dan Majerle's 30-foot three-pointer fell short on the Suns' next possession. Trailing 98–96 and playing a Game 7 on the road if they lost that day, Chicago ran a play that Phil Jackson called "Blind Pig" that had them increasing the play's "thrust" by bringing the ball from 3/4 back of the basket. Although Westphal's sole instruction on the play was for none of the players to double-team any of the Bulls (even Michael Jordan), Danny Ainge left John Paxson to try and either steal the ball or foul Horace Grant, who had missed all five of his shot attempts in the game and wasn't a good crunch-time free throw shooter. Grant saw Paxson alone 25 feet from the basket and fired a perfect pass, and Paxson then made a three pointer with 3.9 seconds left, giving the Bulls a 99–98 lead. Paxson's three-point field goal was the only score by any Bulls player other than Michael Jordan in the entire fourth quarter. The victory was secured by a last-second block from Grant on Kevin Johnson, thanks to Paxson's game-winning 3-point field goal.

Bulls: Michael Jordan 33, Scottie Pippen 23, B. J. Armstrong 18, Horace Grant 1, Bill Cartwright 2, John Paxson 8, Scott Williams 5, Trent Tucker 9, Stacey King 0

Suns: Dan Majerle 21, Kevin Johnson 19, Charles Barkley 21, Richard Dumas 8, Mark West 4, Tom Chambers 12, Danny Ainge 9, Oliver Miller 4, Frank Johnson 0

Michael Jordan, who averaged a Finals-record 41.0 PPG during the six-game series, became the first player in NBA history to win three straight Bill Russell NBA Finals Most Valuable Player Awards. He joined Magic Johnson as the only other player to win the award three times. The NBA started awarding the Finals MVP in 1969. Across 17 games in the NBA Finals from 1991 to 1993, Jordan averaged 36.2 PPG, 7.8 APG, 6.6 RPG on 52% from the field and 42% from 3.

== Player statistics ==
Legend
GP	Games played	GS	Games started	MPG	Minutes per game
FG%	Field-goal percentage	3P%	3-point field-goal percentage	FT%	Free-throw percentage
RPG	Rebounds per game	APG	Assists per game	SPG	Steals per game
BPG	Blocks per game	PPG	Points per game

Chicago Bulls

Chicago Bulls statistics
Player	GP	GS	MPG	FG%	3P%	FT%	RPG	APG	SPG	BPG	PPG
B. J. Armstrong	6	6	41.8	.508	.526	1.000	1.8	5.0	0.8	0.2	13.5
Bill Cartwright	6	6	21.3	.400	.000	.500	3.2	1.7	0.5	0.2	4.3
Horace Grant	6	6	38.8	.528	.000	.579	10.3	2.3	1.5	1.5	11.2
Michael Jordan	6	6	45.7	.508	.400	.694	8.5	6.3	1.7	0.7	41.0
Stacey King	6	0	8.2	.273	.000	.875	1.3	0.5	0.3	0.2	2.2
Rodney McCray	1	0	4.0	.000	.000	.000	1.0	0.0	0.0	0.0	0.0
John Paxson	6	0	16.0	.619	.643	.000	1.5	0.8	0.5	0.2	5.8
Will Perdue	1	0	9.0	.000	.000	.000	3.0	0.0	0.0	0.0	0.0
Scottie Pippen	6	6	44.3	.439	.000	.543	9.2	7.7	2.0	1.0	21.2
Trent Tucker	6	0	6.8	.700	.600	.000	0.3	0.7	0.2	0.0	2.8
Darrell Walker	3	0	1.7	.000	.000	.000	0.0	0.3	0.0	0.0	0.0
Scott Williams	6	0	26.5	.406	.000	.286	6.3	1.7	0.5	1.5	4.7

Phoenix Suns

Phoenix Suns statistics
Player	GP	GS	MPG	FG%	3P%	FT%	RPG	APG	SPG	BPG	PPG
Danny Ainge	6	0	27.0	.475	.667	.778	3.0	2.5	0.3	0.0	8.8
Charles Barkley	6	6	46.2	.476	.250	.750	13.0	5.5	1.2	0.5	27.3
Tom Chambers	6	0	15.3	.359	.000	.800	3.0	0.5	0.2	0.5	6.7
Richard Dumas	6	6	26.7	.571	.000	.778	4.3	1.0	1.3	1.0	15.8
Frank Johnson	6	0	7.3	.412	.000	1.000	0.3	0.8	0.5	0.0	3.0
Kevin Johnson	6	6	43.3	.421	.000	.920	3.0	6.5	1.3	0.3	17.2
Dan Majerle	6	6	46.8	.443	.436	.800	8.2	3.7	1.3	2.2	17.2
Oliver Miller	6	0	17.8	.444	.000	.750	4.2	1.3	0.7	2.0	5.0
Jerrod Mustaf	2	0	1.0	.000	.000	.000	0.0	0.0	0.0	0.0	0.0
Mark West	6	6	21.7	.619	.000	.533	4.3	0.7	0.0	1.2	5.7

== Media coverage ==
This series was aired on NBC with Marv Albert, Bob Costas (hosts), Mike Fratello, Magic Johnson (who missed Game 6 due to attending his brother's wedding), Quinn Buckner (analysts), Ahmad Rashad (Bulls sideline) and Hannah Storm (Suns sideline) (reporters) calling the action. After the series, Johnson soon left NBC and returned to the Lakers for various roles, while Fratello was hired by the Cleveland Cavaliers as their head coach. Both were replaced by recently departed Orlando Magic head coach Matt Guokas. Albert and Fratello later reunited in 1999, this time calling NBA games on TNT, and would continue to do so for several more years.

The 1993 NBA championship documentary, Three-Peat, marked the first time since 1982 that NBA Entertainment used film in on-court or off-court action, although most of it used videotape. It was narrated by Hal Douglas, who narrated the NBA Championship documentaries of the NBA Finals from 1992 to 1997.

== Aftermath ==
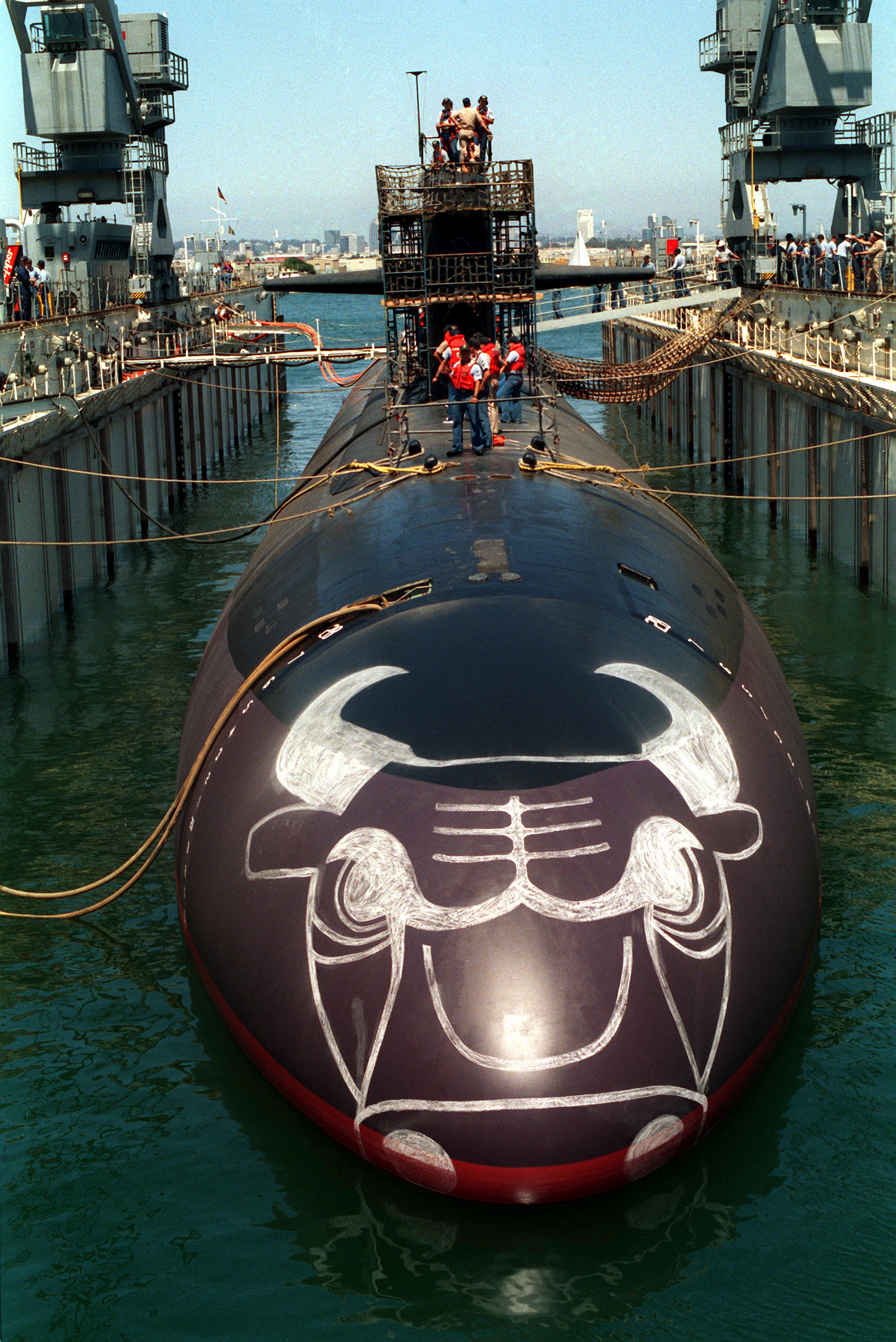
USS Chicago (SSN 721) painted in the Bulls logo after their championship win.

A month after the Bulls' third straight championship, Michael Jordan's father, James R. Jordan, Sr., was murdered. Distraught by the murder of his father, Jordan announced his retirement from basketball a few weeks before the 1993–94 NBA season began, citing a loss of desire to play basketball. Even without Jordan, the Bulls still managed to win 55 games behind the All-Star efforts of Scottie Pippen; however the loss of Jordan was steep to overcome, and following a controversial call that gave the New York Knicks a win in Game 5, the Bulls lost to Knicks in the second round of the 1994 NBA playoffs in Game 7. Jordan returned from retirement in March 1995, following a brief baseball career and would begin another three-peat in 1996, in which the Bulls defeated the Seattle SuperSonics in six games for their fourth championship.

The 1993 Finals was the only appearance of Charles Barkley's Hall of Fame career. This would be the last Finals appearance for the Suns until 2021, which they would also lose in six games to the Milwaukee Bucks after leading the series two games to none. The Suns are still one of ten franchises to have never won an NBA Finals.

John Paxson, the player who hit the game winning shot to give the Bulls the three-peat, stuck around the Bulls organization in many capacities after his playing career was over in 1994. Paxson was on Phil Jackson's staff in 1995-1996, the Bulls team that set the wins record. Afterwards, he stayed with the organization as a part-time color commentator on TV and radio. In 2003, Paxson left his broadcasting position to become general manager for the Bulls after the resignation of longtime Bulls general manager Jerry Krause. During Paxson's helm as lead executive of the Bulls front office, the team experienced average success. From the 2003–04 through 2018–19 seasons, they made the playoffs in all but five seasons, but only made one conference finals appearance. The Bulls have not been back to the NBA Finals since 1998.

The 1993 NBA Finals marked the only instance in the "Big Four" professional sports in which a Chicago team defeated a Phoenix team in a playoff series. In the 2007 National League Division Series, the Arizona Diamondbacks swept the Chicago Cubs 3–0, while in the 2012 Stanley Cup playoffs, the former Phoenix Coyotes defeated the Chicago Blackhawks 4–2.

== See also ==
- 1993 NBA playoffs
- The Last Dance (miniseries)
