= 1993 NBA playoffs =

Postseason tournament

1993 NBA Playoffs

Tournament details
- Dates: April 29–June 20, 1993
- Season: 1992–93
- Teams: 16

Final positions
- Champions: Chicago Bulls (3rd title)
- Runners-up: Phoenix Suns
- Semifinalists: New York Knicks; Seattle SuperSonics

Tournament statistics
- Scoring leader(s): Michael Jordan (Bulls) (35.1 PPG)

Awards
- MVP: Michael Jordan (Bulls)

The 1993 NBA Playoffs was the postseason tournament of the National Basketball Association's 1992–93 season. The tournament concluded with the Eastern Conference champion Chicago Bulls defeating the Western Conference champion Phoenix Suns 4 games to 2 in the NBA Finals. Michael Jordan was named NBA Finals MVP for the third straight year. This was the Suns' second Western Conference title; they made their first NBA Finals appearance since 1976, losing to the Boston Celtics. John Paxson made the series-clinching three-point shot in Game Six of the NBA Finals, securing the Bulls' first of two three-peats during the decade. However, Michael Jordan would retire following the season due to the death of his father.

This edition of the playoffs featured the third of four straight seasons the Bulls and the Knicks faced off. This time the tables were turned as the Bulls had the lower seed in the playoffs as the previous two seasons had Chicago as the higher seed. The Knicks were seeded 8th in 1991 and 4th in 1992. But the result was about the same as the Bulls outlasted the Knicks 4 games to 2 in the 1993 Eastern Conference Finals.

The Knicks–Pacers rivalry started in their first-round encounter, which New York won, 3–1. But it wasn't until the next two meetings (1994 and 1995) that the rivalry became even more intense, particularly due to Reggie Miller's heroics in the Garden that made him a household name and Indiana legitimate contenders in the East.

The Charlotte Hornets made their playoff debut. Their opening-round series versus Boston was also the last time the Celtics made the playoffs with Kevin McHale, who retired after the series, and Robert Parish, who left as a free agent. Game 1 of the series was the final game of Reggie Lewis' career, as he collapsed during the first quarter and did not play for the rest of the series; he died in July of a heart attack.

This was the first edition of the playoffs since 1983 to not feature the Detroit Pistons, who previously made nine straight appearances from 1984 to 1992.

Game 7 of the Western Conference Finals saw the Suns attempt sixty-four free throws while connecting on fifty-seven of them, both NBA postseason records.

== Bracket ==
First round
E1	New York*	3
E8	Indiana	1
E4	Boston	1
E5	Charlotte	3
E3	Cleveland	3
E6	New Jersey	2
E2	Chicago*	3
E7	Atlanta	0
W1	Phoenix*	3
W8	LA Lakers	2
W4	Portland	1
W5	San Antonio	3
W3	Seattle	3
W6	Utah	2
W2	Houston*	3
W7	LA Clippers	2

Quarter-finals
E1	New York*	4
E5	Charlotte	1
E3	Cleveland	0
E2	Chicago*	4
W1	Phoenix*	4
W5	San Antonio	2
W3	Seattle	4
W2	Houston*	3

Semi-finals
E1	New York*	2
E2	Chicago*	4
W1	Phoenix*	4
W3	Seattle	3

Final
E2	Chicago*	4
W1	Phoenix*	2

- * Division winner
- Bold Series winner
- Italic Team with home-court advantage

== First round ==
=== Eastern Conference first round ===
==== (1) New York Knicks vs. (8) Indiana Pacers ====
MSG Network

April 30
7:30 PM

Boxscore

Indiana Pacers 104, New York Knicks 107
Scoring by quarter: 24–34, 22–26, 27–21, 31–26
Pts: Reggie Miller 32; Rebs: LaSalle Thompson 7 Asts: George McCloud 6	Pts: Patrick Ewing 25; Rebs: Ewing, Oakley 9 each Asts: Oakley, Starks 6 each
New York leads series, 1–0

Madison Square Garden, New York City, New York
Attendance: 19,763
Referees: Joe Crawford, Paul Mihalak, Bennett Salvatore

NBC

May 2
12:30 PM

Boxscore

Indiana Pacers 91, New York Knicks 101
Scoring by quarter: 26–18, 29–26, 17–27, 19–30
Pts: Rik Smits 29; Rebs: Dale Davis 9 Asts: Detlef Schrempf 7	Pts: John Starks 29; Rebs: Charles Oakley 12; Asts: Doc Rivers 13
New York leads series, 2–0

Madison Square Garden, New York City, New York
Attendance: 19,763
Referees: Terry Durham, Steve Javie, Mike Mathis

Prime Sports Midwest

May 4
7:00 PM

Boxscore

New York Knicks 93, Indiana Pacers 116
Scoring by quarter: 33–31, 22–18, 15–38, 23–29
Pts: Patrick Ewing 19; Rebs: Patrick Ewing 13; Asts: Doc Rivers 7	Pts: Reggie Miller 36; Rebs: Rik Smits 8 Asts: Pooh Richardson 9
New York leads series, 2–1

Market Square Arena, Indianapolis, Indiana
Attendance: 11,380
Referees: Jim Clark, Jack Madden, Jake O'Donnell

- John Starks is ejected after headbutting Reggie Miller.

TNT

May 6
8:00 PM

Boxscore

New York Knicks 109, Indiana Pacers 100 (OT)
Scoring by quarter: 19–32, 35–17, 16–23, 24–22, Overtime: 15–6
Pts: Patrick Ewing 28; Rebs: Ewing, Oakley 13; Asts: Doc Rivers 11	Pts: Reggie Miller 33; Rebs: Smits, Davis 12 each Asts: Pooh Richardson 8
New York wins series, 3–1

Market Square Arena, Indianapolis, Indiana
Attendance: 13,059
Referees: Dick Bavetta, Ed T. Rush, Don Vaden

Regular-season series
New York won 3–1 in the regular-season series

December 29, 1992

Recap

Indiana Pacers 91, New York Knicks 97

Madison Square Garden, New York City

December 30, 1992

Recap

New York Knicks 94, Indiana Pacers 90

Market Square Arena, Indianapolis

March 14, 1993

Recap

Indiana Pacers 90, New York Knicks 121

Madison Square Garden, New York City

April 16, 1993

Recap

New York Knicks 94, Indiana Pacers 100

Market Square Arena, Indianapolis

This was the first playoff meeting between the Knicks and the Pacers.

==== (2) Chicago Bulls vs. (7) Atlanta Hawks ====
TNT

April 30
8:00 PM

Boxscore

Atlanta Hawks 90, Chicago Bulls 114
Scoring by quarter: 28–36, 20–26, 17–33, 25–19
Pts: Dominique Wilkins 24; Rebs: three players 5 each Asts: Mookie Blaylock 5	Pts: Michael Jordan 35; Rebs: Horace Grant 10; Asts: Trent Tucker 7
Chicago leads series, 1–0

Chicago Stadium, Chicago, Illinois
Attendance: 18,676
Referees: Nolan Fine, Steve Javie, Mike Mathis

NBC

May 2
5:30 PM

Boxscore

Atlanta Hawks 102, Chicago Bulls 117
Scoring by quarter: 22–24, 27–32, 21–29, 32–32
Pts: Dominique Wilkins 37; Rebs: Kevin Willis 13; Asts: Dominique Wilkins 5	Pts: Michael Jordan 29; Rebs: Horace Grant 8 Asts: John Paxson 7
Chicago leads series, 2–0

Chicago Stadium, Chicago, Illinois
Attendance: 18,676
Referees: Joe Crawford, Bennett Salvatore, Greg Willard

- Michael Jordan hits the half-court shot at the buzzer to end the first half.

TNT

May 4
8:00 PM

Boxscore

Chicago Bulls 98, Atlanta Hawks 88
Scoring by quarter: 26–30, 24–17, 24–20, 24–21
Pts: Michael Jordan 39; Rebs: Horace Grant 9 Asts: B. J. Armstrong 6	Pts: Dominique Wilkins 29; Rebs: Jon Koncak 9 Asts: Mookie Blaylock 6
Chicago wins series, 3–0

Omni Coliseum, Atlanta, Georgia
Attendance: 15,141
Referees: Darell Garretson, Hue Hollins, Lee Jones

Regular-season series
Tied 2–2 in the regular-season series

November 7, 1992

Recap

Atlanta Hawks 100, Chicago Bulls 99

Chicago Stadium, Chicago, Illinois

December 8, 1992

Recap

Chicago Bulls 114, Atlanta Hawks 123

The Omni, Atlanta

February 27, 1993

Recap

Atlanta Hawks 92, Chicago Bulls 112

Chicago Stadium, Chicago, Illinois

April 9, 1993

Recap

Chicago Bulls 88, Atlanta Hawks 87

The Omni, Atlanta

This was the third playoff meeting between these two teams, with the Hawks winning both meetings.

Previous playoff series
Atlanta leads 2–0 in all-time playoff series

1967

St. Louis Hawks 3, Chicago Bulls 0

1967 Western Division Semifinals

1970

Atlanta Hawks 4, Chicago Bulls 1

1970 Western Division Semifinals

==== (3) Cleveland Cavaliers vs. (6) New Jersey Nets ====
SportsChannel Ohio

April 29
7:30 PM

Boxscore

New Jersey Nets 98, Cleveland Cavaliers 114
Scoring by quarter: 27–39, 20–29, 26–27, 25–19
Pts: Derrick Coleman 31; Rebs: Derrick Coleman 10; Asts: Cheeks, George 5 each	Pts: Craig Ehlo 16; Rebs: Brad Daugherty 14; Asts: Mark Price 7
Cleveland leads series, 1–0

Richfield Coliseum, Richfield, Ohio
Attendance: 18,339
Referees: Ron Garretson, Jess Kersey, Don Vaden

TNT

May 1
7:00 PM

Boxscore

New Jersey Nets 101, Cleveland Cavaliers 99
Scoring by quarter: 24–25, 21–24, 28–22, 28–28
Pts: Derrick Coleman 27; Rebs: Derrick Coleman 14; Asts: Rumeal Robinson 9	Pts: Price, Nance 17 each Rebs: Larry Nance 12; Asts: Mark Price 11
Series tied, 1–1

Richfield Coliseum, Richfield, Ohio
Attendance: 20,273
Referees: David Jones, Bill Oakes, Jake O'Donnell

SportsChannel New York

May 5
7:30 PM

Boxscore

Cleveland Cavaliers 93, New Jersey Nets 84
Scoring by quarter: 17–26, 28–24, 32–20, 16–14
Pts: Larry Nance 23; Rebs: Larry Nance 17; Asts: Mark Price 4	Pts: Derrick Coleman 22; Rebs: Derrick Coleman 13; Asts: Rumeal Robinson 9
Cleveland leads series, 2–1

Brendan Byrne Arena, East Rutherford, New Jersey
Attendance: 16,453
Referees: Hue Hollins, Ed Middleton, Ed T. Rush

TNT

May 7
7:00 PM

Boxscore

Cleveland Cavaliers 79, New Jersey Nets 96
Scoring by quarter: 21–24, 20–31, 20–33, 18–8
Pts: Brad Daugherty 29; Rebs: four players 5 each Asts: Mark Price 6	Pts: Chris Morris 22; Rebs: Derrick Coleman 14; Asts: Coleman, Robinson 8 each
Series tied, 2–2

Brendan Byrne Arena, East Rutherford, New Jersey
Attendance: 15,238
Referees: Dan Crawford, Joe Crawford, Joe Forte

- Bernard King's final NBA game.

NBC

May 9
12:30 PM

Boxscore

New Jersey Nets 89, Cleveland Cavaliers 99
Scoring by quarter: 24–20, 14–27, 24–28, 27–24
Pts: Derrick Coleman 33; Rebs: Derrick Coleman 16; Asts: Rumeal Robinson 6	Pts: Brad Daugherty 24; Rebs: Brad Daugherty 20; Asts: Brad Daugherty 8
Cleveland wins series, 3–2

Richfield Coliseum, Richfield, Ohio
Attendance: 17,388
Referees: Hugh Evans, Mike Mathis, Eddie F. Rush

- Maurice Cheeks and Dražen Petrović's final NBA game; Petrović dies a month later in a car crash.
- This would be the last playoff series victory for Cleveland without LeBron James until 2024.

Regular-season series
Tied 2–2 in the regular-season series

December 26, 1992

Recap

New Jersey Nets 119, Cleveland Cavaliers 114

The Coliseum, Richfield, Ohio

January 13, 1993

Recap

Cleveland Cavaliers 98, New Jersey Nets 104

Meadowlands Arena, East Rutherford, New Jersey

April 4, 1993

Recap

New Jersey Nets 99, Cleveland Cavaliers 105

The Coliseum, Richfield, Ohio

April 10, 1993

Recap

Cleveland Cavaliers 100, New Jersey Nets 99

Meadowlands Arena, East Rutherford, New Jersey

This was the second playoff meeting between these two teams, with the Cavaliers winning the first meeting.

Previous playoff series
Cleveland leads 1–0 in all-time playoff series

1992

Cleveland Cavaliers 3, New Jersey Nets 1

1992 Eastern Conference First Round

==== (4) Boston Celtics vs. (5) Charlotte Hornets ====
TNT

April 29
8:00 PM

Boxscore

Charlotte Hornets 101, Boston Celtics 112
Scoring by quarter: 34–29, 19–24, 18–30, 30–29
Pts: Gill, Mourning 30 each Rebs: Larry Johnson 13; Asts: Muggsy Bogues 15	Pts: Xavier McDaniel 21; Rebs: Douglas, Parish 9 each Asts: Sherman Douglas 11
Boston leads series, 1–0

Boston Garden, Boston, Massachusetts
Attendance: 14,890
Referees: Terry Durham, Bill Oakes, Jake O'Donnell

- Celtics forward Reggie Lewis' final NBA game, he collapses on the court and did not play for the rest of the series; he dies 3 months later from a heart defect.

NBC

May 1
1:00 PM

Boxscore

Charlotte Hornets 99, Boston Celtics 98 (2OT)
Scoring by quarter: 23–24, 19–23, 27–18, 22–26, Overtime: 6–6, 2–1
Pts: Larry Johnson 23; Rebs: Alonzo Mourning 14; Asts: Muggsy Bogues 8	Pts: Kevin McHale 30; Rebs: Robert Parish 16; Asts: Sherman Douglas 10
Series tied, 1–1

Boston Garden, Boston, Massachusetts
Attendance: 14,890
Referees: Ron Garretson, Jess Kersey, Don Vaden

- Xavier McDaniel hits the game-tying jumper with 25.8 seconds left in regulation to force the first OT; Kevin McHale hits the game-tying jumper with 6 seconds left in the first OT to force the second OT.

TNT

May 3
8:00 PM

Boxscore

Boston Celtics 89, Charlotte Hornets 119
Scoring by quarter: 28–27, 16–32, 27–29, 18–31
Pts: Kevin Gamble 19; Rebs: Alaa Abdelnaby 6 Asts: Sherman Douglas 8	Pts: Larry Johnson 29; Rebs: Larry Johnson 11; Asts: Muggsy Bogues 7
Charlotte leads series, 2–1

Charlotte Coliseum, Charlotte, North Carolina
Attendance: 23,698
Referees: Mike Mathis, Ed Middleton, Eddie F. Rush

TNT

May 5
8:00 PM

Boxscore

Boston Celtics 103, Charlotte Hornets 104
Scoring by quarter: 23–31, 23–28, 24–29, 33–16
Pts: Robert Parish 24; Rebs: Robert Parish 9 Asts: Sherman Douglas 9	Pts: Alonzo Mourning 33; Rebs: Alonzo Mourning 7 Asts: Muggsy Bogues 9
Charlotte wins series, 3–1

Charlotte Coliseum, Charlotte, North Carolina
Attendance: 23,698
Referees: Dan Crawford, Bob Delaney, Darell Garretson

- Alonzo Mourning hits the series-winning shot with 4 tenths left; also Kevin McHale's final NBA game.

Regular-season series
Boston won 3–1 in the regular-season series

November 11, 1992

Recap

Boston Celtics 109, Charlotte Hornets 99

Charlotte Coliseum, Charlotte, North Carolina

November 27, 1992

Recap

Charlotte Hornets 102, Boston Celtics 111

Boston Garden, Boston

January 5, 1993

Recap

Boston Celtics 107, Charlotte Hornets 103

Charlotte Coliseum, Charlotte, North Carolina

March 14, 1993

Recap

Charlotte Hornets 96, Boston Celtics 93

Boston Garden, Boston

This was the first playoff meeting between the Celtics and the Hornets.

=== Western Conference first round ===
==== (1) Phoenix Suns vs. (8) Los Angeles Lakers ====
TNT

April 30
10:30 PM

Boxscore

Los Angeles Lakers 107, Phoenix Suns 103
Scoring by quarter: 27–33, 26–13, 30–33, 24–24
Pts: Sedale Threatt 35; Rebs: Vlade Divac 10; Asts: Sedale Threatt 7	Pts: Charles Barkley 34; Rebs: Charles Barkley 15; Asts: Majerle, Knight 5 each
LA Lakers lead series, 1–0

America West Arena, Phoenix, Arizona
Attendance: 19,023
Referees: Ken Mauer, Jack Nies, Ed T. Rush

NBC

May 2
3:00 PM

Boxscore

Los Angeles Lakers 86, Phoenix Suns 81
Scoring by quarter: 21–24, 24–19, 20–27, 21–11
Pts: Vlade Divac 19; Rebs: Green, Divac 13 each Asts: Sedale Threatt 8	Pts: three players 18 each Rebs: Charles Barkley 21; Asts: Kevin Johnson 16
LA Lakers lead series, 2–0

America West Arena, Phoenix, Arizona
Attendance: 19,023
Referees: Dan Crawford, Bob Delaney, Hugh Evans

TNT

May 4
10:30 PM

Boxscore

Phoenix Suns 107, Los Angeles Lakers 102
Scoring by quarter: 27–24, 24–20, 34–32, 22–26
Pts: Charles Barkley 27; Rebs: Charles Barkley 11; Asts: three players 5 each	Pts: Vlade Divac 30; Rebs: A.C. Green 17; Asts: Sedale Threatt 10
LA Lakers lead series, 2–1

Great Western Forum, Inglewood, California
Attendance: 17,505
Referees: Bernie Fryer, Jess Kersey, Bill Oakes

TNT

May 6
10:30 PM

Boxscore

Phoenix Suns 101, Los Angeles Lakers 86
Scoring by quarter: 21–19, 22–20, 28–20, 30–27
Pts: Charles Barkley 28; Rebs: Charles Barkley 11; Asts: Kevin Johnson 6	Pts: Vlade Divac 17; Rebs: A.C. Green 15; Asts: Sedale Threatt 6
Series tied, 2–2

Great Western Forum, Inglewood, California
Attendance: 17,505
Referees: Jim Clark, Jack Madden, Jake O'Donnell

NBC

May 9
5:30 PM

Boxscore

Los Angeles Lakers 104, Phoenix Suns 112 (OT)
Scoring by quarter: 24–24, 21–22, 26–32, 24–17, Overtime: 9–17
Pts: James Worthy 24; Rebs: A.C. Green 19; Asts: Sedale Threatt 9	Pts: Charles Barkley 31; Rebs: Charles Barkley 14; Asts: Kevin Johnson 13
Phoenix wins series, 3–2

America West Arena, Phoenix, Arizona
Attendance: 19,023
Referees: Dick Bavetta, Joe Crawford, Bennett Salvatore

- Dan Majerle hits the game-tying shot with 13.6 seconds left to force OT; After losing the first two games of the series, at the post game press conference Suns head coach Paul Westphal said that they would go to LA and win the next two games and then come back to Phoenix and win game 5, "and everyone will say what a great series it was."

Regular-season series
Phoenix won 5–0 in the regular-season series

December 4, 1992

Recap

Los Angeles Lakers 93, Phoenix Suns 103

America West Arena, Phoenix, Arizona

December 18, 1992

Recap

Phoenix Suns 116, Los Angeles Lakers 100

Great Western Forum, Inglewood, California

February 5, 1993

Recap

Los Angeles Lakers 104, Phoenix Suns 132

America West Arena, Phoenix, Arizona

March 24, 1993

Recap

Phoenix Suns 120, Los Angeles Lakers 105

Great Western Forum, Inglewood, California

April 6, 1993

Recap

Los Angeles Lakers 114, Phoenix Suns 115

America West Arena, Phoenix, Arizona

This was the eighth playoff meeting between these two teams, with the Lakers winning six of the first seven meetings.

Previous playoff series
Los Angeles leads 6–1 in all-time playoff series.

1970

Los Angeles Lakers 4, Phoenix Suns 3

1970 Western Division Semifinals

1980

Los Angeles Lakers 4, Phoenix Suns 1

1980 Western Conference Semifinals

1982

Los Angeles Lakers 4, Phoenix Suns 0

1982 Western Conference Semifinals

1984

Los Angeles Lakers 4, Phoenix Suns 2

1984 Western Conference Finals

1985

Los Angeles Lakers 3, Phoenix Suns 0

1985 Western Conference First Round

1989

Los Angeles Lakers 4, Phoenix Suns 0

1989 Western Conference Finals

1990

Los Angeles Lakers 1, Phoenix Suns 4

1990 Western Conference Semifinals

==== (2) Houston Rockets vs. (7) Los Angeles Clippers ====
Home Sports Entertainment

April 29
8:00 PM

Boxscore

Los Angeles Clippers 94, Houston Rockets 117
Scoring by quarter: 18–33, 29–26, 24–32, 23–26
Pts: Mark Jackson 26; Rebs: three players 8 each Asts: Gary Grant 8	Pts: Hakeem Olajuwon 28; Rebs: Hakeem Olajuwon 11; Asts: Winston Garland 9
Houston leads series, 1–0

The Summit, Houston, Texas
Attendance: 16,611
Referees: Dick Bavetta, Jim Clark, Eddie F. Rush

TNT

May 1
9:30 PM

Boxscore

Los Angeles Clippers 95, Houston Rockets 83
Scoring by quarter: 22–22, 24–19, 26–25, 23–17
Pts: Ron Harper 29; Rebs: Ken Norman 12; Asts: Mark Jackson 8	Pts: Hakeem Olajuwon 30; Rebs: Hakeem Olajuwon 14; Asts: three players 4 each
Series tied, 1–1

The Summit, Houston, Texas
Attendance: 16,611
Referees: Lee Jones, Jack Madden, Ed T. Rush

TNT

May 3
10:30 PM

Boxscore

Houston Rockets 111, Los Angeles Clippers 99
Scoring by quarter: 30–22, 25–18, 33–32, 23–27
Pts: Hakeem Olajuwon 32; Rebs: Hakeem Olajuwon 12; Asts: Kenny Smith 7	Pts: Danny Manning 23; Rebs: Ken Norman 9 Asts: Mark Jackson 8
Houston leads series, 2–1

Los Angeles Memorial Sports Arena, Los Angeles, California
Attendance: 12,628
Referees: Bruce Alexander, Hugh Evans, Ronnie Nunn

TNT

May 5
10:30 PM

Boxscore

Houston Rockets 90, Los Angeles Clippers 93
Scoring by quarter: 20–23, 24–25, 31–26, 15–19
Pts: Hakeem Olajuwon 25; Rebs: Hakeem Olajuwon 18; Asts: Hakeem Olajuwon 9	Pts: Ron Harper 21; Rebs: Stanley Roberts 13; Asts: Mark Jackson 7
Series tied, 2–2

Los Angeles Memorial Sports Arena, Los Angeles, California
Attendance: 14,710
Referees: Ron Garretson, Jess Kersey, Bill Oakes

NBC

May 8
1:00 PM

Boxscore

Los Angeles Clippers 80, Houston Rockets 84
Scoring by quarter: 25–26, 19–13, 12–28, 24–17
Pts: Danny Manning 24; Rebs: Danny Manning 12; Asts: Mark Jackson 9	Pts: Hakeem Olajuwon 31; Rebs: Hakeem Olajuwon 21; Asts: Kenny Smith 6
Houston wins series, 3–2

The Summit, Houston, Texas
Attendance: 16,611
Referees: Darell Garretson, Steve Javie, Mike Mathis

Regular-season series
Houston won 4–0 in the regular-season series.

November 24, 1992

Recap

Los Angeles Clippers 83, Houston Rockets 88

The Summit, Houston, Texas

January 12, 1993

Recap

Houston Rockets 113, Los Angeles Clippers 103

Los Angeles Memorial Sports Arena, Los Angeles

March 2, 1993

Recap

Houston Rockets 99, Los Angeles Clippers 83

Los Angeles Memorial Sports Arena, Los Angeles

April 6, 1993

Recap

Los Angeles Clippers 101, Houston Rockets 114

The Summit, Houston, Texas

This was the first playoff meeting between the Rockets and the Clippers.

==== (3) Seattle SuperSonics vs. (6) Utah Jazz ====
Prime Sports Northwest

April 30
10:00 PM

Boxscore

Utah Jazz 85, Seattle SuperSonics 99
Scoring by quarter: 17–26, 19–19, 20–26, 29–28
Pts: Karl Malone 24; Rebs: Karl Malone 13; Asts: John Stockton 7	Pts: Shawn Kemp 29; Rebs: Shawn Kemp 17; Asts: Nate McMillan 9
Seattle leads series, 1–0

Seattle Center Coliseum, Seattle, Washington
Attendance: 14,429
Referees: Dan Crawford, Bob Delaney, Hugh Evans

TNT

May 2
9:00 PM

Boxscore

Utah Jazz 89, Seattle SuperSonics 85
Scoring by quarter: 23–15, 21–18, 18–30, 27–22
Pts: Karl Malone 26; Rebs: Karl Malone 9 Asts: John Stockton 12	Pts: Gary Payton 19; Rebs: Sam Perkins 10; Asts: Nate McMillan 7
Series tied, 1–1

Seattle Center Coliseum, Seattle, Washington
Attendance: 14,513
Referees: Darell Garretson, Tommy Nunez Sr., Ronnie Nunn

Prime Sports Intermountain West

May 4
9:00 PM

Boxscore

Seattle SuperSonics 80, Utah Jazz 90
Scoring by quarter: 26–20, 24–25, 19–18, 11–27
Pts: Perkins, Johnson 20 each Rebs: Perkins, Cage 9 each Asts: Ricky Pierce 5	Pts: Karl Malone 23; Rebs: Eaton, Corbin 9 each Asts: John Stockton 10
Utah leads series, 2–1

Delta Center, Salt Lake City, Utah
Attendance: 19,911
Referees: Dick Bavetta, Joe Forte, Greg Willard

Prime Sports Intermountain West

May 6
9:00 PM

Boxscore

Seattle SuperSonics 93, Utah Jazz 80
Scoring by quarter: 28–22, 16–22, 26–20, 23–16
Pts: Eddie Johnson 24; Rebs: Shawn Kemp 11; Asts: McKey, Payton 6 each	Pts: Karl Malone 21; Rebs: Karl Malone 12; Asts: John Stockton 15
Series tied, 2–2

Delta Center, Salt Lake City, Utah
Attendance: 19,911
Referees: Steve Javie, Mike Mathis, Eddie F. Rush

NBC

May 8
3:30 PM

Boxscore

Utah Jazz 92, Seattle SuperSonics 100
Scoring by quarter: 18–17, 21–13, 18–39, 35–31
Pts: Karl Malone 26; Rebs: Karl Malone 12; Asts: John Stockton 11	Pts: Sam Perkins 20; Rebs: Sam Perkins 13; Asts: Gary Payton 7
Seattle wins series, 3–2

Seattle Center Coliseum, Seattle, Washington
Attendance: 14,812
Referees: Jack Madden, Jack Nies, Jake O'Donnell

Regular-season series
Tied 2–2 in the regular-season series

January 14, 1993

Recap

Seattle SuperSonics 89, Utah Jazz 96

Delta Center, Salt Lake City

January 18, 1993

Recap

Utah Jazz 96, Seattle SuperSonics 106

Seattle Center Coliseum, Seattle

February 11, 1993

Recap

Utah Jazz 101, Seattle SuperSonics 96

Seattle Center Coliseum, Seattle

March 19, 1993

Recap

Seattle SuperSonics 108, Utah Jazz 97

Delta Center, Salt Lake City

This was the second playoff meeting between these two teams, with the Jazz winning the first meeting.

Previous playoff series
Utah leads 1–0 in all-time playoff series

1992

Seattle SuperSonics 1, Utah Jazz 4

1992 Western Conference Semifinals

==== (4) Portland Trail Blazers vs. (5) San Antonio Spurs ====
TNT

April 29
10:30 PM

Boxscore

San Antonio Spurs 87, Portland Trail Blazers 86
Scoring by quarter: 20–26, 14–20, 24–24, 29–16
Pts: Sean Elliott 18; Rebs: David Robinson 15; Asts: Elliott, Johnson 7 each	Pts: Jerome Kersey 24; Rebs: Jerome Kersey 9 Asts: Rod Strickland 9
San Antonio leads series, 1–0

Memorial Coliseum, Portland, Oregon
Attendance: 12,888
Referees: Bernie Fryer, Darell Garretson, Hue Hollins

NBC

May 1
3:30 PM

Boxscore

San Antonio Spurs 96, Portland Trail Blazers 105
Scoring by quarter: 24–30, 30–24, 29–24, 13–27
Pts: Robinson, Cummings 15 each Rebs: David Robinson 14; Asts: Avery Johnson 6	Pts: Clyde Drexler 21; Rebs: Rod Strickland 8 Asts: Rod Strickland 9
Series tied, 1–1

Memorial Coliseum, Portland, Oregon
Attendance: 12,888
Referees: Dick Bavetta, Joe Forte, Tommy Nunez Sr.

Home Sports Entertainment

May 5
8:30 PM

Boxscore

Portland Trail Blazers 101, San Antonio Spurs 107
Scoring by quarter: 28–25, 25–28, 30–25, 18–29
Pts: Clyde Drexler 19; Rebs: Buck Williams 7 Asts: Rod Strickland 9	Pts: David Robinson 26; Rebs: David Robinson 14; Asts: Avery Johnson 6
San Antonio leads series, 2–1

HemisFair Arena, San Antonio, Texas
Attendance: 16,057
Referees: Joe Crawford, Paul Mihalak, Jack Nies

TNT

May 7
9:30 PM

Boxscore

Portland Trail Blazers 97, San Antonio Spurs 100 (OT)
Scoring by quarter: 23–28, 23–33, 24–13, 19–15, Overtime: 8–11
Pts: Mark Bryant 21; Rebs: Jerome Kersey 14; Asts: Rod Strickland 10	Pts: Dale Ellis 21; Rebs: David Robinson 17; Asts: David Robinson 11
San Antonio wins series, 3–1

HemisFair Arena, San Antonio, Texas
Attendance: 16,057
Referees: Hugh Evans, Ronnie Nunn, Bennett Salvatore

- Sean Elliott hits the game-tying lay-up with 1:27 left to force OT.

Regular-season series
Tied 2–2 in the regular-season series

November 24, 1992

Recap

San Antonio Spurs 91, Portland Trail Blazers 95

Memorial Coliseum, Portland, Oregon

January 9, 1993

Recap

Portland Trail Blazers 93, San Antonio Spurs 109

HemisFair Arena, San Antonio

March 13, 1993

Recap

Portland Trail Blazers 99, San Antonio Spurs 108

HemisFair Arena, San Antonio

April 18, 1993

Recap

San Antonio Spurs 101, Portland Trail Blazers 105

Memorial Coliseum, Portland, Oregon

This was the second playoff meeting between these two teams, with the Trail Blazers winning the first meeting.

Previous playoff series
Portland leads 1–0 in all-time playoff series

1990

Portland Trail Blazers 4, San Antonio Spurs 3

1990 Western Conference Semifinals

== Conference semifinals ==
=== Eastern Conference semifinals ===
==== (1) New York Knicks vs. (5) Charlotte Hornets ====
NBC

May 9
3:00 PM

Boxscore

Charlotte Hornets 95, New York Knicks 111
Scoring by quarter: 34–26, 23–31, 23–23, 15–31
Pts: Alonzo Mourning 27; Rebs: Alonzo Mourning 13; Asts: Muggsy Bogues 8	Pts: Patrick Ewing 33; Rebs: Ewing, Oakley 10 each Asts: John Starks 12
New York leads series, 1–0

Madison Square Garden, New York City, New York
Attendance: 19,763
Referees: Ron Garretson, Hue Hollins, Jess Kersey

TNT

May 12
8:00 PM

Boxscore

Charlotte Hornets 101, New York Knicks 105 (OT)
Scoring by quarter: 28–35, 22–22, 26–14, 17–22, Overtime: 8–12
Pts: Alonzo Mourning 24; Rebs: Sidney Green 10; Asts: Muggsy Bogues 7	Pts: Patrick Ewing 34; Rebs: Charles Oakley 16; Asts: Doc Rivers 7
New York leads series, 2–0

Madison Square Garden, New York City, New York
Attendance: 19,763
Referees: Dick Bavetta, Tommy Nunez Sr., Bill Oakes

TNT

May 14
8:00 PM

Boxscore

New York Knicks 106, Charlotte Hornets 110 (2OT)
Scoring by quarter: 25–28, 27–20, 19–25, 23–21, Overtime: 8–8, 4–8
Pts: Patrick Ewing 26; Rebs: Patrick Ewing 14; Asts: John Starks 8	Pts: Alonzo Mourning 34; Rebs: Alonzo Mourning 10; Asts: Muggsy Bogues 8
New York leads series, 2–1

Charlotte Coliseum, Charlotte, North Carolina
Attendance: 23,698
Referees: Hugh Evans, Ronnie Nunn, Bennett Salvatore

- Alonzo Mourning hits the game-tying shot with 30.9 seconds left in regulation to force the first OT, then hits the game-tying free throws with 12 seconds left in the first OT to force the second OT.

NBC

May 16
1:00 PM

Boxscore

New York Knicks 94, Charlotte Hornets 92
Scoring by quarter: 36–34, 22–17, 22–23, 14–18
Pts: Patrick Ewing 28; Rebs: Patrick Ewing 10; Asts: Doc Rivers 8	Pts: Larry Johnson 24; Rebs: Alonzo Mourning 8 Asts: Muggsy Bogues 5
New York leads series, 3–1

Charlotte Coliseum, Charlotte, North Carolina
Attendance: 23,698
Referees: Joe Crawford, Steve Javie, Greg Willard

TNT

May 18
8:00 PM

Boxscore

Charlotte Hornets 101, New York Knicks 105
Scoring by quarter: 18–24, 24–21, 23–30, 36–30
Pts: Kendall Gill 26; Rebs: Alonzo Mourning 12; Asts: Kendall Gill 6	Pts: Charles Oakley 21; Rebs: Charles Oakley 11; Asts: John Starks 9
New York wins series, 4–1

Madison Square Garden, New York City, New York
Attendance: 19,763
Referees: Joe Forte, Jack Madden, Ed T. Rush

Regular-season series
New York won 3–1 in the regular-season series

December 10, 1992

Recap

Charlotte Hornets 110, New York Knicks 103 (OT)

Madison Square Garden, New York City

January 20, 1993

Recap

Charlotte Hornets 91, New York Knicks 114

Madison Square Garden, New York City

February 17, 1993

Recap

New York Knicks 124, Charlotte Hornets 116

Charlotte Coliseum, Charlotte, North Carolina

April 14, 1993

Recap

New York Knicks 111, Charlotte Hornets 107

Charlotte Coliseum, Charlotte, North Carolina

This was the first playoff meeting between the Knicks and the Hornets.

==== (2) Chicago Bulls vs. (3) Cleveland Cavaliers ====
TNT

May 11
8:00 PM report = Boxscore

Cleveland Cavaliers 84, Chicago Bulls 91
Scoring by quarter: 21–20, 26–26, 16–18, 21–27
Pts: Gerald Wilkins 19; Rebs: Nance, Daugherty 8 each Asts: Brad Daugherty 6	Pts: Michael Jordan 43; Rebs: Bill Cartwright 10; Asts: Pippen, Jordan 4 each
Chicago leads series, 1–0

Chicago Stadium, Chicago, Illinois
Attendance: 18,676
Referees: Paul Mihalak, Jack Nies, Jake O'Donnell

TNT

May 13
8:00 PM

Boxscore

Cleveland Cavaliers 85, Chicago Bulls 104
Scoring by quarter: 25–29, 17–28, 20–27, 23–20
Pts: Larry Nance 16; Rebs: Nance, Daugherty 7 each Asts: Mark Price 8	Pts: Horace Grant 20; Rebs: Scott Williams 10; Asts: Scottie Pippen 7
Chicago leads series, 2–0

Chicago Stadium, Chicago, Illinois
Attendance: 18,676
Referees: Joe Crawford, Jack Madden, Don Vaden

NBC

May 15
3:30 PM

Boxscore

Chicago Bulls 96, Cleveland Cavaliers 90
Scoring by quarter: 22–28, 28–25, 24–22, 22–15
Pts: Michael Jordan 32; Rebs: Scottie Pippen 9 Asts: Scottie Pippen 6	Pts: Larry Nance 24; Rebs: Brad Daugherty 11; Asts: three players 6 each
Chicago leads series, 3–0

Richfield Coliseum, Richfield, Ohio
Attendance: 20,273
Referees: Joe Forte, Darell Garretson, Hue Hollins

TNT

May 17
8:00 PM

Boxscore

Chicago Bulls 103, Cleveland Cavaliers 101
Scoring by quarter: 23–27, 25–25, 27–30, 28–19
Pts: Michael Jordan 31; Rebs: Horace Grant 10; Asts: Michael Jordan 6	Pts: Brad Daugherty 25; Rebs: Brad Daugherty 13; Asts: Wilkins, Price 6 each
Chicago wins series, 4–0

Richfield Coliseum, Richfield, Ohio
Attendance: 20,274
Referees: Dick Bavetta, Bill Oakes, Eddie F. Rush

- Michael Jordan hits the series-winning shot at the buzzer against Cleveland for the second time in his career, often referred to as “The Shot II.”

Regular-season series
Cleveland won 3–2 in the regular-season series

November 6, 1992

Recap

Chicago Bulls 101, Cleveland Cavaliers 96

The Coliseum, Richfield, Ohio

December 9, 1992

Recap

Cleveland Cavaliers 91, Chicago Bulls 108

Chicago Stadium, Chicago, Illinois

January 6, 1993

Recap

Chicago Bulls 95, Cleveland Cavaliers 117

The Coliseum, Richfield, Ohio

February 13, 1993

Recap

Cleveland Cavaliers 116, Chicago Bulls 111

Chicago Stadium, Chicago, Illinois

April 18, 1993

Recap

Chicago Bulls 94, Cleveland Cavaliers 103

The Coliseum, Richfield, Ohio

This was the fourth playoff meeting between these two teams, with the Bulls winning the first three meetings.

Previous playoff series
Chicago leads 3–0 in all-time playoff series

1988

Chicago Bulls 3, Cleveland Cavaliers 2

1988 Eastern Conference First Round

1989

Chicago Bulls 3, Cleveland Cavaliers 2

1989 Eastern Conference First Round

1992

Chicago Bulls 4, Cleveland Cavaliers 2

1992 Eastern Conference Finals

=== Western Conference semifinals ===
==== (1) Phoenix Suns vs. (5) San Antonio Spurs ====
TNT

May 11
10:30 PM

Boxscore

San Antonio Spurs 89, Phoenix Suns 98
Scoring by quarter: 19–32, 19–14, 28–29, 23–23
Pts: David Robinson 32; Rebs: David Robinson 10; Asts: Vinny Del Negro 6	Pts: Kevin Johnson 25; Rebs: Charles Barkley 10; Asts: Kevin Johnson 7
Phoenix leads series, 1–0

America West Arena, Phoenix, Arizona
Attendance: 19,023
Referees: Joe Forte, Darell Garretson, Lee Jones

TNT

May 13
10:30 PM

Boxscore

San Antonio Spurs 103, Phoenix Suns 109
Scoring by quarter: 18–25, 23–27, 24–26, 38–31
Pts: David Robinson 27; Rebs: David Robinson 10; Asts: three players 6 each	Pts: Charles Barkley 35; Rebs: Charles Barkley 10; Asts: Kevin Johnson 12
Phoenix leads series, 2–0

America West Arena, Phoenix, Arizona
Attendance: 19,023
Referees: Bob Delaney, Hue Hollins, Ed T. Rush

NBC

May 15
1:00 PM

Boxscore

Phoenix Suns 96, San Antonio Spurs 111
Scoring by quarter: 22–27, 33–38, 23–23, 18–23
Pts: Kevin Johnson 26; Rebs: Charles Barkley 14; Asts: Kevin Johnson 7	Pts: Antoine Carr 21; Rebs: A. Johnson, Robinson 8 each Asts: Avery Johnson 15
Phoenix leads series, 2–1

HemisFair Arena, San Antonio, Texas
Attendance: 16,057
Referees: Ron Garretson, Mike Mathis, Bill Oakes

NBC

May 16
3:30 PM

Boxscore

Phoenix Suns 103, San Antonio Spurs 117
Scoring by quarter: 26–26, 30–26, 24–33, 23–32
Pts: Kevin Johnson 26; Rebs: Charles Barkley 12; Asts: Kevin Johnson 8	Pts: David Robinson 36; Rebs: David Robinson 16; Asts: Avery Johnson 12
Series tied, 2–2

HemisFair Arena, San Antonio, Texas
Attendance: 16,057
Referees: Dan Crawford, Jess Kersey, Jack Nies

TNT

May 18
10:30 PM

Boxscore

San Antonio Spurs 97, Phoenix Suns 109
Scoring by quarter: 29–33, 31–29, 23–16, 14–31
Pts: David Robinson 24; Rebs: David Robinson 8 Asts: Avery Johnson 15	Pts: Charles Barkley 36; Rebs: Charles Barkley 12; Asts: Kevin Johnson 12
Phoenix leads series, 3–2

America West Arena, Phoenix, Arizona
Attendance: 19,023
Referees: Hugh Evans, Bennett Salvatore, Don Vaden

TNT

May 20
7:00 PM

Boxscore

Phoenix Suns 102, San Antonio Spurs 100
Scoring by quarter: 32–26, 24–32, 20–25, 26–17
Pts: Charles Barkley 28; Rebs: Charles Barkley 21; Asts: Kevin Johnson 8	Pts: David Robinson 22; Rebs: David Robinson 14; Asts: Avery Johnson 10
Phoenix wins series, 4–2

HemisFair Arena, San Antonio, Texas
Attendance: 16,057
Referees: Steve Javie, Jack Madden, Jake O'Donnell

- Charles Barkley hits the series-winning shot with 1.8 seconds left, also the Spurs played their final game at the HemisFair Arena before moving to the Alamodome the following season.

Regular-season series
Phoenix won 3–1 in the regular-season series.

January 3, 1993

Recap

Phoenix Suns 113, San Antonio Spurs 114 (OT)

HemisFair Arena, San Antonio

January 29, 1993

Recap

San Antonio Spurs 110, Phoenix Suns 125

America West Arena, Phoenix, Arizona

February 23, 1993

Recap

Phoenix Suns 105, San Antonio Spurs 103

HemisFair Arena, San Antonio

April 24, 1993

Recap

San Antonio Spurs 97, Phoenix Suns 99

America West Arena, Phoenix, Arizona

This was the second playoff meeting between these two teams, with the Suns winning the first meeting.

Previous playoff series
Phoenix leads 1–0 in all-time playoff series.

1992

Phoenix Suns 3, San Antonio Spurs 0

1992 Western Conference First Round

==== (2) Houston Rockets vs. (3) Seattle SuperSonics ====
TNT

May 10
9:00 PM

Boxscore

Houston Rockets 90, Seattle SuperSonics 99
Scoring by quarter: 22–19, 25–30, 23–27, 20–23
Pts: Hakeem Olajuwon 26; Rebs: Hakeem Olajuwon 16; Asts: Smith, Horry 5 each	Pts: Ricky Pierce 23; Rebs: Shawn Kemp 11; Asts: Nate McMillan 10
Seattle leads series, 1–0

Seattle Center Coliseum, Seattle, Washington
Attendance: 14,252
Referees: Dan Crawford, Ed Middleton, Ed T. Rush

TNT

May 12
10:30 PM

Boxscore

Houston Rockets 100, Seattle SuperSonics 111
Scoring by quarter: 21–22, 28–23, 26–32, 25–34
Pts: Hakeem Olajuwon 28; Rebs: Hakeem Olajuwon 13; Asts: Vernon Maxwell 9	Pts: Sam Perkins 23; Rebs: Michael Cage 14; Asts: Derrick McKey 7
Seattle leads series, 2–0

Seattle Center Coliseum, Seattle, Washington
Attendance: 14,732
Referees: Steve Javie, Jess Kersey, Greg Willard

TNT

May 15
8:00 PM

Boxscore

Seattle SuperSonics 79, Houston Rockets 97
Scoring by quarter: 19–25, 15–24, 13–27, 32–21
Pts: Shawn Kemp 12; Rebs: Perkins, Cage 9 each Asts: Nate McMillan 4	Pts: Otis Thorpe 28; Rebs: Otis Thorpe 14; Asts: Kenny Smith 6
Seattle leads series, 2–1

The Summit, Houston, Texas
Attendance: 16,611
Referees: Jack Madden, Jake O'Donnell, Eddie F. Rush

TNT

May 16
8:00 PM

Boxscore

Seattle SuperSonics 92, Houston Rockets 103
Scoring by quarter: 19–29, 24–25, 25–20, 24–29
Pts: Shawn Kemp 23; Rebs: Shawn Kemp 18; Asts: Nate McMillan 8	Pts: Hakeem Olajuwon 24; Rebs: Hakeem Olajuwon 12; Asts: Scott Brooks 7
Series tied, 2–2

The Summit, Houston, Texas
Attendance: 16,611
Referees: Hugh Evans, Ronnie Nunn, Bennett Salvatore

Prime Sports Northwest

May 18
10:00 PM

Boxscore

Houston Rockets 95, Seattle SuperSonics 120
Scoring by quarter: 17–24, 24–35, 31–27, 23–34
Pts: Hakeem Olajuwon 25; Rebs: Hakeem Olajuwon 14; Asts: Hakeem Olajuwon 5	Pts: Ricky Pierce 24; Rebs: Shawn Kemp 12; Asts: Nate McMillan 5
Seattle leads series, 3–2

Seattle Center Coliseum, Seattle, Washington
Attendance: 14,433
Referees: Bob Delaney, Darell Garretson, Hue Hollins

- This game marked the final time the NBA Playoffs aired exclusively on local TV.

TNT

May 20
9:30 PM

Boxscore

Seattle SuperSonics 90, Houston Rockets 103
Scoring by quarter: 22–20, 25–23, 15–36, 28–24
Pts: Perkins, Payton 14 each Rebs: Shawn Kemp 9 Asts: three players 3 each	Pts: Kenny Smith 30; Rebs: Olajuwon, Thorpe 10 each Asts: Robert Horry 7
Series tied, 3–3

The Summit, Houston, Texas
Attendance: 16,611
Referees: Joe Crawford, Mike Mathis, Bill Oakes

NBC

May 22
3:30 PM

Boxscore

Houston Rockets 100, Seattle SuperSonics 103 (OT)
Scoring by quarter: 26–20, 22–18, 22–35, 23–20, Overtime: 7–10
Pts: Hakeem Olajuwon 23; Rebs: Hakeem Olajuwon 17; Asts: Hakeem Olajuwon 9	Pts: Ricky Pierce 25; Rebs: Shawn Kemp 11; Asts: Nate McMillan 6
Seattle wins series, 4–3

Seattle Center Coliseum, Seattle, Washington
Attendance: 14,812
Referees: Dick Bavetta, Hugh Evans, Ed T. Rush

- Ricky Pierce hits the game-tying shot with 23.9 seconds left to force OT.

Regular-season series
Seattle won 3–1 in the regular-season series

November 6, 1992

Recap

Seattle SuperSonics 111, Houston Rockets 94

Yokohama Arena, Yokohama, Japan

November 7, 1992

Recap

Houston Rockets 85, Seattle SuperSonics 89

Yokohama Arena, Yokohama, Japan

March 21, 1993

Recap

Seattle SuperSonics 100, Houston Rockets 89

The Summit, Houston, Texas

April 17, 1993

Recap

Houston Rockets 86, Seattle SuperSonics 81

Seattle Center Coliseum, Seattle

This was the fourth playoff meeting between these two teams, with the SuperSonics winning the first three meetings.

Previous playoff series
Seattle leads 3–0 in all-time playoff series

1982

Houston Rockets 1, Seattle SuperSonics 2

1982 Western Conference First Round

1987

Houston Rockets 2, Seattle SuperSonics 4

1987 Western Conference Semifinals

1989

Houston Rockets 0, Seattle SuperSonics 3

1989 Western Conference First Round

== Conference finals ==
=== Eastern Conference finals ===
==== (1) New York Knicks vs. (2) Chicago Bulls ====
NBC

May 23
3:30 PM

Boxscore

Chicago Bulls 90, New York Knicks 98
Scoring by quarter: 25–24, 23–20, 21–28, 21–26
Pts: Michael Jordan 27; Rebs: Horace Grant 8 Asts: Michael Jordan 5	Pts: Ewing, Starks 25 each Rebs: Patrick Ewing 17; Asts: Doc Rivers 5
New York leads series, 1–0

Madison Square Garden, New York City, New York
Attendance: 19,763
Referees: Hue Hollins, Jake O'Donnell, Bennett Salvatore

TNT

May 25
8:00 PM

Boxscore

Chicago Bulls 91, New York Knicks 96
Scoring by quarter: 25–27, 24–22, 14–28, 28–19
Pts: Michael Jordan 36; Rebs: Michael Jordan 9 Asts: Pippen, Williams 4 each	Pts: Patrick Ewing 26; Rebs: Charles Oakley 16; Asts: John Starks 9
New York leads series, 2–0

Madison Square Garden, New York City, New York
Attendance: 19,763
Referees: Dan Crawford, Joe Crawford, Bill Oakes

- John Starks' famous dunk on Horace Grant with 47.3 seconds left in the game.

NBC

May 29
3:30 PM

Boxscore

New York Knicks 83, Chicago Bulls 103
Scoring by quarter: 23–34, 20–28, 21–25, 19–16
Pts: Patrick Ewing 21; Rebs: Patrick Ewing 9 Asts: Ewing, Anthony 5 each	Pts: Scottie Pippen 29; Rebs: Scottie Pippen 8 Asts: Michael Jordan 11
New York leads series, 2–1

Chicago Stadium, Chicago, Illinois
Attendance: 18,676
Referees: Hugh Evans, Steve Javie, Jack Madden

NBC

May 31
3:30 PM

Boxscore

New York Knicks 95, Chicago Bulls 105
Scoring by quarter: 29–33, 23–28, 25–24, 18–20
Pts: Starks, Ewing 24 each Rebs: Charles Oakley 12; Asts: John Starks 7	Pts: Michael Jordan 54; Rebs: Scottie Pippen 7 Asts: Scottie Pippen 4
Series tied, 2–2

Chicago Stadium, Chicago, Illinois
Attendance: 18,676
Referees: Dick Bavetta, Darell Garretson, Jack Nies

- Michael Jordan scores 54 points, the most against the Knicks in a playoff game by any player.

NBC

June 2
9:00 PM

Boxscore

Chicago Bulls 97, New York Knicks 94
Scoring by quarter: 31–28, 24–28, 25–21, 17–17
Pts: Michael Jordan 29; Rebs: Scottie Pippen 11; Asts: Michael Jordan 14	Pts: Patrick Ewing 33; Rebs: Patrick Ewing 9 Asts: John Starks 8
Chicago leads series, 3–2

Madison Square Garden, New York City, New York
Attendance: 19,763
Referees: Hue Hollins, Mike Mathis, Ed T. Rush

- B. J. Armstrong hits the clutch three with 1:16 left; Charles Smith gets denied four straight times (Horace Grant, Michael Jordan, and Scottie Pippen) near the end of the game.

NBC

June 4
9:00 PM

Boxscore

New York Knicks 88, Chicago Bulls 96
Scoring by quarter: 21–29, 25–20, 22–22, 20–25
Pts: Patrick Ewing 26; Rebs: Patrick Ewing 13; Asts: Doc Rivers 8	Pts: Michael Jordan 25; Rebs: Horace Grant 11; Asts: Michael Jordan 9
Chicago wins series, 4–2

Chicago Stadium, Chicago, Illinois
Attendance: 18,676
Referees: Jess Kersey, Jake O'Donnell, Bennett Salvatore

Regular-season series
New York won 3–1 in the regular-season series.

November 28, 1992

Recap

Chicago Bulls 75, New York Knicks 112

Madison Square Garden, New York City

December 25, 1992

Recap

New York Knicks 77, Chicago Bulls 89

Chicago Stadium, Chicago, Illinois

February 12, 1993

Recap

New York Knicks 104, Chicago Bulls 98

Chicago Stadium, Chicago, Illinois

April 25, 1993

Recap

Chicago Bulls 84, New York Knicks 89

Madison Square Garden, New York City

This was the fifth playoff meeting between these two teams, with the Bulls winning the first four meetings.

Previous playoff series
Chicago leads 4–0 in all-time playoff series

1981

Chicago Bulls 2, New York Knicks 0

1981 Eastern Conference First Round

1989

Chicago Bulls 4, New York Knicks 2

1989 Eastern Conference Semifinals

1991

Chicago Bulls 3, New York Knicks 0

1991 Eastern Conference First Round

1992

Chicago Bulls 4, New York Knicks 3

1992 Eastern Conference Semifinals

=== Western Conference finals ===
==== (1) Phoenix Suns vs. (3) Seattle SuperSonics ====
TNT

May 24
9:00 PM

Boxscore

Seattle SuperSonics 91, Phoenix Suns 105
Scoring by quarter: 23–24, 24–27, 18–25, 26–29
Pts: Derrick McKey 17; Rebs: Shawn Kemp 10; Asts: Nate McMillan 7	Pts: Cedric Ceballos 21; Rebs: Charles Barkley 14; Asts: Dan Majerle 9
Phoenix leads series, 1–0

America West Arena, Phoenix, Arizona
Attendance: 19,023
Referees: Darell Garretson, Jess Kersey, Eddie F. Rush

TNT

May 26
9:00 PM

Boxscore

Seattle SuperSonics 103, Phoenix Suns 99
Scoring by quarter: 18–24, 30–30, 22–22, 33–23
Pts: Ricky Pierce 34; Rebs: Nate McMillan 8 Asts: Nate McMillan 6	Pts: Dan Majerle 29; Rebs: Majerle, Barkley 10 each Asts: Charles Barkley 6
Series tied, 1–1

America West Arena, Phoenix, Arizona
Attendance: 19,023
Referees: Mike Mathis, Ronnie Nunn, Bennett Salvatore

TNT

May 28
9:00 PM

Boxscore

Phoenix Suns 104, Seattle SuperSonics 97
Scoring by quarter: 32–25, 25–31, 23–24, 24–17
Pts: Kevin Johnson 20; Rebs: Charles Barkley 16; Asts: Kevin Johnson 9	Pts: Ricky Pierce 28; Rebs: Shawn Kemp 12; Asts: Nate McMillan 5
Phoenix leads series, 2–1

Seattle Center Coliseum, Seattle, Washington
Attendance: 14,812
Referees: Dick Bavetta, Ron Garretson, Ed T. Rush

NBC

May 30
3:30 PM

Boxscore

Phoenix Suns 101, Seattle SuperSonics 120
Scoring by quarter: 29–37, 29–24, 18–26, 25–33
Pts: Charles Barkley 27; Rebs: Charles Barkley 7 Asts: Kevin Johnson 7	Pts: McKey, Kemp 20 each Rebs: Shawn Kemp 8 Asts: Derrick McKey 6
Series tied, 2–2

Seattle Center Coliseum, Seattle, Washington
Attendance: 14,812
Referees: Dan Crawford, Hue Hollins, Jake O'Donnell

NBC

June 1
9:00 PM

Boxscore

Seattle SuperSonics 114, Phoenix Suns 120
Scoring by quarter: 28–28, 26–31, 27–25, 33–36
Pts: Shawn Kemp 33; Rebs: Perkins, Kemp 6 each Asts: Gary Payton 8	Pts: Charles Barkley 43; Rebs: Charles Barkley 15; Asts: Barkley, K. Johnson 10 each
Phoenix leads series, 3–2

America West Arena, Phoenix, Arizona
Attendance: 19,023
Referees: Joe Crawford, Steve Javie, Jack Madden

NBC

June 3
9:00 PM

Boxscore

Phoenix Suns 102, Seattle SuperSonics 118
Scoring by quarter: 25–27, 25–34, 25–25, 27–32
Pts: Kevin Johnson 22; Rebs: Charles Barkley 11; Asts: Kevin Johnson 4	Pts: Ricky Pierce 27; Rebs: Shawn Kemp 15; Asts: Derrick McKey 5
Series tied, 3–3

Seattle Center Coliseum, Seattle, Washington
Attendance: 14,812
Referees: Hugh Evans, Darell Garretson, Bill Oakes

NBC

June 5
3:30 PM

Boxscore

Seattle SuperSonics 110, Phoenix Suns 123
Scoring by quarter: 26–31, 25–26, 29–34, 30–32
Pts: Eddie Johnson 34; Rebs: Shawn Kemp 8 Asts: Nate McMillan 7	Pts: Charles Barkley 44; Rebs: Charles Barkley 24; Asts: Kevin Johnson 9
Phoenix wins series, 4–3

America West Arena, Phoenix, Arizona
Attendance: 19,023
Referees: Dick Bavetta, Mike Mathis, Ed T. Rush

Regular-season series
Seattle won 3–2 in the regular-season series.

November 16, 1992

Recap

Seattle SuperSonics 108, Phoenix Suns 117

America West Arena, Phoenix, Arizona

December 26, 1992

Recap

Seattle SuperSonics 110, Phoenix Suns 113

America West Arena, Phoenix, Arizona

January 12, 1993

Recap

Phoenix Suns 113, Seattle SuperSonics 122

Seattle Center Coliseum, Seattle

February 13, 1993

Recap

Phoenix Suns 94, Seattle SuperSonics 95

Seattle Center Coliseum, Seattle

April 16, 1993

Recap

Seattle SuperSonics 108, Phoenix Suns 102

America West Arena, Phoenix, Arizona

This was the third playoff meeting between these two teams, with each team winning one series.

Previous playoff series
Tied 1–1 in all-time playoff series

1976

Phoenix Suns 4, Seattle SuperSonics 2

1976 Western Conference Semifinals

1979

Phoenix Suns 3, Seattle SuperSonics 4

1979 Western Conference Finals

== NBA Finals: (W1) Phoenix Suns vs. (E2) Chicago Bulls ==
NBC

June 9
9:00 PM

Boxscore

Chicago Bulls 100, Phoenix Suns 92
Scoring by quarter: 34–20, 18–21, 21–28, 27–23
Pts: Michael Jordan 31; Rebs: Scott Williams 10; Asts: four players 5 each	Pts: Charles Barkley 21; Rebs: Richard Dumas 12; Asts: Charles Barkley 5
Chicago leads series, 1–0

America West Arena, Phoenix, Arizona
Attendance: 19,023
Referees: Hugh Evans, Jess Kersey, Hue Hollins

NBC

June 11
9:00 PM

Boxscore

Chicago Bulls 111, Phoenix Suns 108
Scoring by quarter: 28–29, 31–24, 28–31, 24–24
Pts: Michael Jordan 42; Rebs: Jordan, Pippen 12 each Asts: Scottie Pippen 12	Pts: Charles Barkley 42; Rebs: Charles Barkley 13; Asts: Kevin Johnson 7
Chicago leads series, 2–0

America West Arena, Phoenix, Arizona
Attendance: 19,023
Referees: Jake O'Donnell, Joey Crawford, Jack Madden

- The team with home-court advantage in the NBA Finals loses the first two games at home for the first time ever.

NBC

June 13
7:00 PM

Boxscore

Phoenix Suns 129, Chicago Bulls 121 (3OT)
Scoring by quarter: 29–29, 29–28, 28–28, 17–18, Overtime: 4–4, 7–7, 15–7
Pts: Dan Majerle 28; Rebs: Charles Barkley 19; Asts: Kevin Johnson 9	Pts: Michael Jordan 44; Rebs: Horace Grant 17; Asts: Scottie Pippen 9
Chicago leads series, 2–1

Chicago Stadium, Chicago, Illinois
Attendance: 18,676
Referees: Dick Bavetta, Darell Garretson, Mike Mathis

- This game marks the second time in NBA Finals history that a game goes to triple OT after game 5 of the 1976 NBA Finals (in which the Suns lost to the Boston Celtics); Horace Grant hits the game-tying 3-point play with 1:33 left in regulation to force the first OT; Tom Chambers hits the game-tying lay-up with 50.9 seconds left in the first OT to force the second OT; Dan Majerle hits the game-tying shot with 3.2 seconds left in the second OT to force the third OT.

NBC

June 16
9:00 PM

Boxscore

Phoenix Suns 105, Chicago Bulls 111
Scoring by quarter: 27–31, 31–30, 23–25, 24–25
Pts: Charles Barkley 32; Rebs: Charles Barkley 12; Asts: Charles Barkley 10	Pts: Michael Jordan 55; Rebs: Horace Grant 16; Asts: Scottie Pippen 10
Chicago leads series, 3–1

Chicago Stadium, Chicago, Illinois
Attendance: 18,676
Referees: Hugh Evans, Ed T. Rush, Bill Oakes

NBC

June 18
9:00 PM

Boxscore

Phoenix Suns 108, Chicago Bulls 98
Scoring by quarter: 33–21, 21–28, 26–24, 28–25
Pts: Johnson, Dumas 25 each Rebs: Dan Majerle 12; Asts: Kevin Johnson 8	Pts: Michael Jordan 41; Rebs: Grant, Jordan 7 each Asts: Michael Jordan 7
Chicago leads series, 3–2

Chicago Stadium, Chicago, Illinois
Attendance: 18,676
Referees: Jake O'Donnell, Joey Crawford, Jess Kersey

- The last NBA Finals game in Chicago Stadium.

NBC

June 20
7:30 PM

Boxscore

Chicago Bulls 99, Phoenix Suns 98
Scoring by quarter: 37–28, 19–23, 31–28, 12–19
Pts: Michael Jordan 33; Rebs: Scottie Pippen 12; Asts: Michael Jordan 7	Pts: Barkley, Majerle 21 each Rebs: Charles Barkley 17; Asts: Kevin Johnson 10
Chicago wins series, 4–2

America West Arena, Phoenix, Arizona
Attendance: 19,023
Referees: Darell Garretson, Ed T. Rush, Mike Mathis

- John Paxson hits the title-winning 3 with 3.9 seconds left; Horace Grant then blocks Kevin Johnson just before the buzzer.

Regular-season series
Tied 1–1 in the regular-season series

November 22, 1992

Recap

Chicago Bulls 128, Phoenix Suns 111

America West Arena, Phoenix, Arizona

March 30, 1993

Recap

Phoenix Suns 113, Chicago Bulls 109

Chicago Stadium, Chicago, Illinois

This was the first playoff meeting between the Bulls and the Suns.

== Statistical leaders ==
Category	Game high			Average			
Category	Player	Team	High	Player	Team	Avg.	GP
Points	Michael Jordan	Chicago Bulls	55	Michael Jordan	Chicago Bulls	35.1	19
Rebounds	Charles Barkley	Phoenix Suns	24	A.C. Green	Los Angeles Lakers	14.6	5
Assists	Kevin Johnson	Phoenix Suns	16	John Stockton	Utah Jazz	11.0	5
Steals	Charles Barkley	Phoenix Suns	7	Ron Harper	Los Angeles Clippers	3.0	5
Blocks	Derrick Coleman; Hakeem Olajuwon	New Jersey Nets; Houston Rockets	9	Hakeem Olajuwon	Houston Rockets	4.8	12

== Notes ==
- The league's best team during the regular season, the Phoenix Suns, were on the verge of playoff elimination after losing the first two games at home against the #8 seeded Los Angeles Lakers. However, they recovered to win Games 3 and 4 in Los Angeles to tie the series at 2–2. In Game 5, Dan Majerie hit an off-balance mid-range to force overtime. The Suns eventually pulled away to win Game 5, 112–104, at home to avoid becoming the first #1 seed to lose to a #8 seed. This would happen the following postseason, when the #8 Denver Nuggets defeated the #1 Seattle SuperSonics 3–2 (the Nuggets came back from a 2–0 series deficit to pull it off).
- Both #5 seeds, Charlotte and San Antonio, beat their #4 seeded opponent in the first round.
- The fifth-year Charlotte Hornets made their playoff debut, and became the first of the 1988/89 expansion teams (Charlotte, Orlando, Minnesota, and Miami) to win a playoff series, beating Boston 3–1.
- The New York Knicks took a 2–0 series lead over the Chicago Bulls in the Conference Finals. However, headlines in New York papers and tabloids angered and energized Bulls superstar Michael Jordan, who torched the Knicks for 54 points in Game 4 after shooting 3–18 in Game 3 to even up the series. This performance surpassed Sam Jones's 51-point game against the 1967 Knicks as the most points ever scored by a player against the Knicks in a playoff game. The Bulls went to Madison Square Garden, won Game 5 97–94, and clinched the series at home in Game 6 with a 96–88 victory.
- Celtics' star Reggie Lewis fainted on the court during Game 1 against the Hornets. He briefly returned to the game before sitting out the rest of the series. He died less than three months later from a heart condition.
- After the Suns defeated the Sonics in Game 7 of the Western Conference Finals, there were complaints about the free throw comparison between the two teams.
- Game 6 of the Suns–Spurs series was the last game ever played at the HemisFair Arena.
- The Cavaliers defeated the Nets in the Eastern Conference First Round, which was their last playoff series victory until 2006, and their last without LeBron James until 2024. Game 5 of that series was also the last game played by Dražen Petrović, who died in a car accident five weeks later.
- The 1993 playoffs would generate the highest NBA playoff viewership averages until 2026. On April 26, 2026, playoff viewership indicated it saw an average of 3.84 million viewers per game across ESPN, ABC, NBC, Peacock, and Prime Video. 7 of the 8 teams that played in the 93 western conference playoffs, played in the nba finals of the 1990's . Blazers lost to the pistons and the Bulls in the 1990 & 1992 finals. The lakers lost 2 bulls in the 1991 nba finals. The suns lost to the bulls in the 1993 finals. The rockets beat the Knicks in game 7 of the nba finals in 1994, then swept the Orlando magic in the 1995 nba finals . The sonics lost to the bulls in the 1996 nba finals.The jazz lost 2 the bulls in back to back nba finals in 1997 & 1998 . The spurs won the last nba championship of the 1990's defeating the new york Knicks in the 50 games strike shortened 1999 nba season
