= 1992–93 Miami Heat season =

NBA professional basketball team season

- Head coach: Kevin Loughery
- General manager: Lewis Schaffel
- Owners: Ted Arison; Billy Cunningham; Lewis Schaffel
- Arena: Miami Arena

Results
- Record: 36–46 (.439)
- Place: Division: 5th (Atlantic); Conference: 11th (Eastern)
- Playoff finish: Did not qualify
- Stats at Basketball Reference

Local media
- Television: WBFS-TV; Sunshine Network (Eric Reid, Jack Ramsay)
- Radio: WQAM (David J. Halberstam)

The 1992–93 Miami Heat season was the fifth season for the Miami Heat in the National Basketball Association.

== Season summary ==
=== Off-season ===
The Heat had the twelfth overall pick in the 1992 NBA draft, and selected shooting guard Harold Miner from the University of Southern California. During the off-season, the team acquired John Salley from the Detroit Pistons; Salley won two NBA championships with the Pistons between 1989 and 1990.

=== Regular season ===
Despite the addition of Miner and Salley, the Heat struggled with a 6–17 start to the regular season, and later on held a 10–25 record as of January 20, 1993. The team dealt with injuries, as second-year star Steve Smith missed the first 31 games of the season due to a knee injury, while Kevin Edwards only played just 40 games, and was benched after starting in 30 of them, and Willie Burton only appeared in just 26 games due to a wrist injury. The Heat struggled in the first half of the season, and held an 18–31 record at the All-Star break.

With Smith back in the starting lineup, the Heat played solid basketball posting a six-game winning streak between February and March, and winning 18 of their 28 games also between February and March. However, the team lost six of their final seven games of the season, finishing in fifth place in the Atlantic Division, and in eleventh place in the Eastern Conference with a 36–46 record. The team finished five games behind the 8th–seeded Indiana Pacers, who defeated the Heat, 94–88 at the Market Square Arena on the final day of the regular season on April 24, 1993, to gain the final NBA playoff spot in the East.

Glen Rice averaged 19.0 points and 5.2 rebounds per game, and led the Heat with 148 three-point field goals, while Rony Seikaly averaged 17.1 points, 11.8 rebounds and 1.2 blocks per game, and Smith provided the team with 16.0 points and 5.6 assists per game in 48 games. In addition, Grant Long averaged 14.0 points, 7.5 rebounds and 1.4 steals per game, while Edwards contributed 13.9 points and 1.7 steals per game, and Bimbo Coles provided with 10.6 points and 4.6 assists per game. Meanwhile, Miner contributed 10.3 points per game off the bench, while Salley averaged 8.3 points, 6.1 rebounds and 1.4 blocks per game in only 51 games, and Brian Shaw provided with 7.3 points and 3.5 assists per game.

During the NBA All-Star weekend at the Delta Center in Salt Lake City, Utah, Miner won the NBA Slam Dunk Contest. The Heat finished 17th in the NBA in home-game attendance, with an attendance of 614,915 at the Miami Arena during the regular season.

=== Aftermath ===
Following the season, Edwards, who was one of the few players left from the team's inaugural season, signed as a free agent with the New Jersey Nets.

== Draft picks ==
Round	Pick	Player	Position	Nationality	School/Club team
1	12	Harold Miner	SG	United States	USC
2	37	Isaiah Morris	SF	United States	Arkansas
2	42	Matt Geiger	C	United States	Georgia Tech

== Roster ==
1992–93 Miami Heat roster
Players

Pos.	No.	Player	Height	Weight	DOB	From
SF	2	Keith Askins	6 ft 7 in (2.01 m)	197 lb (89 kg)	1967–12–15	Alabama
SF	34	Willie Burton	6 ft 8 in (2.03 m)	210 lb (95 kg)	1968–05–26	Minnesota
PG	12	Bimbo Coles	6 ft 1 in (1.85 m)	180 lb (82 kg)	1968–04–22	Virginia Tech
PG	21	Kevin Edwards	6 ft 3 in (1.91 m)	190 lb (86 kg)	1965–10–30	DePaul
C	52	Matt Geiger	7 ft 0 in (2.13 m)	243 lb (110 kg)	1969–09–10	Georgia Tech
C	33	Alec Kessler	6 ft 11 in (2.11 m)	230 lb (104 kg)	1967–01–13	Georgia
PF	43	Grant Long	6 ft 8 in (2.03 m)	225 lb (102 kg)	1966–03–12	Eastern Michigan
SG	32	Harold Miner	6 ft 5 in (1.96 m)	210 lb (95 kg)	1971–05–05	USC
SF	41	Glen Rice	6 ft 7 in (2.01 m)	215 lb (98 kg)	1967–05–28	Michigan
PF	22	John Salley	6 ft 11 in (2.11 m)	230 lb (104 kg)	1964–05–16	Georgia Tech
C	4	Rony Seikaly	6 ft 11 in (2.11 m)	230 lb (104 kg)	1965–05–10	Syracuse
SG	20	Brian Shaw	6 ft 6 in (1.98 m)	190 lb (86 kg)	1966–03–22	UC Santa Barbara
SG	3	Steve Smith	6 ft 7 in (2.01 m)	200 lb (91 kg)	1969–03–31	Michigan State

Coaches
Head coach
- Kevin Loughery
Assistant(s)
- Alvin Gentry
- Bob Staak

Legend
- (DP) Unsigned draft pick
- (FA) Free agent
- (S) Suspended
- Injured

Roster
Updated: September 8, 1992

== Regular season ==
=== Season standings ===
Atlantic Division	W	L	PCT	GB	Home	Road	Div
y-New York Knicks	60	22	.732	—	37–4	23–18	23–5
x-Boston Celtics	48	34	.585	12	28–13	20–21	19–9
x-New Jersey Nets	43	39	.524	17	26–15	17–24	14–14
Orlando Magic	41	41	.500	19	27–14	14–27	15–13
Miami Heat	36	46	.439	24	26–15	10–31	9–19
Philadelphia 76ers	26	56	.317	34	15–26	11–30	11–17
Washington Bullets	22	60	.268	38	15–26	7–34	7–21

y – clinched division title
x – clinched playoff spot

#	Eastern Conference				
#	Team	W	L	PCT	GB
1	c-New York Knicks	60	22	.732	–
2	y-Chicago Bulls	57	25	.695	3
3	x-Cleveland Cavaliers	54	28	.659	6
4	x-Boston Celtics	48	34	.585	12
5	x-Charlotte Hornets	44	38	.537	16
6	x-New Jersey Nets	43	39	.524	17
7	x-Atlanta Hawks	43	39	.524	17
8	x-Indiana Pacers	41	41	.500	19
9	Orlando Magic	41	41	.500	19
10	Detroit Pistons	40	42	.488	20
11	Miami Heat	36	46	.439	24
12	Milwaukee Bucks	28	54	.341	32
13	Philadelphia 76ers	26	56	.317	36
14	Washington Bullets	22	60	.268	38

z – clinched division title
y – clinched division title
x – clinched playoff spot

== Player statistics ==
=== Ragular season ===
Player	POS	GP	GS	MP	REB	AST	STL	BLK	PTS	MPG	RPG	APG	SPG	BPG	PPG
Glen Rice	SF	82	82	3,082	424	180	92	25	1,554	37.6	5.2	2.2	1.1	.3	19.0
Bimbo Coles	PG	81	37	2,232	166	373	80	11	855	27.6	2.0	4.6	1.0	.1	10.6
Grant Long	PF	76	62	2,728	568	182	104	31	1,061	35.9	7.5	2.4	1.4	.4	14.0
Harold Miner	SG	73	0	1,383	147	73	34	8	750	18.9	2.0	1.0	.5	.1	10.3
Rony Seikaly	C	72	64	2,456	846	100	38	83	1,232	34.1	11.8	1.4	.5	1.2	17.1
Keith Askins	SF	69	1	935	198	31	31	29	227	13.6	2.9	.4	.4	.4	3.3
Brian Shaw	PG	68	45	1,603	257	235	48	19	498	23.6	3.8	3.5	.7	.3	7.3
John Salley	PF	51	34	1,422	313	83	32	70	423	27.9	6.1	1.6	.6	1.4	8.3
Steve Smith	SG	48	43	1,610	197	267	50	16	766	33.5	4.1	5.6	1.0	.3	16.0
Matt Geiger	C	48	2	554	120	14	15	18	214	11.5	2.5	.3	.3	.4	4.5
Kevin Edwards	SG	40	30	1,134	121	120	68	12	556	28.4	3.0	3.0	1.7	.3	13.9
Alec Kessler	PF	40	2	415	91	14	4	12	155	10.4	2.3	.4	.1	.3	3.9
Willie Burton	SF	26	8	451	70	16	13	16	204	17.3	2.7	.6	.5	.6	7.8

== Awards, records, and honors ==
- Harold Miner, NBA All-Star Weekend Slam Dunk Contest Champion
