= Alaa Abdelnaby =

Egyptian-American basketball player (born 1968)

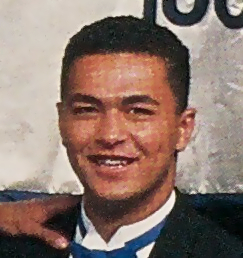
- Abdelnaby in 1988

Personal information
- Born: June 24, 1968 (age 58) Alexandria, United Arab Republic (now Egypt)
- Listed height: 6 ft 10 in (2.08 m)
- Listed weight: 240 lb (109 kg)

Career information
- High school: Bloomfield (Bloomfield, New Jersey)
- College: Duke (1986–1990)
- NBA draft: 1990: 1st round, 25th overall pick
- Drafted by: Portland Trail Blazers
- Playing career: 1990–2000
- Position: Power forward / center
- Number: 31, 5, 4, 30

Career history
- 1990–1992: Portland Trail Blazers
- 1992: Milwaukee Bucks
- 1992–1994: Boston Celtics
- 1994–1995: Sacramento Kings
- 1995: Philadelphia 76ers
- 1995–1996: Papagou BC
- 1996–1997: Omaha Racers
- 1997–1998: Olympique Antibes
- 1999–2000: Idaho Stampede

Career highlights
- Third-team All-ACC (1990); McDonald's All-American (1986); Fourth-team Parade All-American (1986)

Career NBA statistics
- Points: 1465 (5.7 ppg)
- Rebounds: 846 (3.3 rpg)
- Assists: 85 (0.3 apg)
- Stats at NBA.com
- Stats at Basketball Reference

Alaa Abdelnaby (Arabic: علاء عبد النبي; born June 24, 1968) is an Egyptian-American former professional basketball player. He played college basketball for the Duke Blue Devils followed by a five-year National Basketball Association (NBA) career, and then stints in various other leagues. Abdelnaby is one of two Egyptian-born players in the history of the NBA, along with Abdel Nader.

Abdelnaby works as a basketball broadcaster and analyst for NBCS Philadelphia, CBS Sports Network, and Westwood One Radio.

== Early life ==
Abdelnaby was born in Alexandria, Egypt, and moved to the United States at the age of two. His father was an engineer and his mother was a computer analyst who had moved to find better jobs. His family became American citizens.

Abdelnaby was raised in Nutley and Bloomfield, New Jersey, and played on the Bloomfield High School basketball team. Abdelnaby was selected as a standout American high school athlete as both a McDonald's All-American and a Parade All-American.

== College career ==
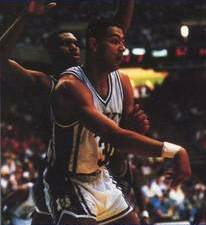
Abdelnaby with Duke c. 1988

Abdelnaby played at Duke University from 1986 to 1990. He had a breakout year as a senior when he averaged 14.9 points and 6.7 rebounds during the regular season. Abdelnaby was a third-team all-Atlantic Coast Conference (ACC) selection as a senior. He had a series of widely publicized off-court problems during his early seasons, including an accident where he drove his car into a tree on campus.

Abdelnaby commented on Duke University's academic requirements: "The only way I can make five A's is when I sign my name."

== Professional career ==
Abdelnaby was selected by the Portland Trail Blazers of the National Basketball Association with the 25th pick of the 1990 NBA draft, and he spent five years in the league, playing for Portland as well as the Milwaukee Bucks, Boston Celtics, Philadelphia 76ers, and Sacramento Kings. He was signed by the Golden State Warriors but he never played for that franchise.

After leaving the NBA, Abdelnaby played for the Papagou BC (Greece) (1995–1996), the Omaha Racers (CBA) (1996–1997), Olympique Antibes (France) (1997–1998), and the Idaho Stampede (CBA) (1999–2000).

=== Transactions ===
- 1990, June 27 – First round, 25th pick of the Portland Trail Blazers in the 1990 NBA draft
- 1992, July 1 – Traded for Milwaukee Bucks' rights to Tracy Murray
- 1992, December 4 – Traded for Boston Celtics' rights to Jon Barry
- 1994, July 26 – Free agent, signed by the Sacramento Kings
- 1995, March 21 – Released by the Sacramento Kings
- 1995, March 24 – Free agent, signed by the Philadelphia 76ers to a 10-day contract
- 1995, April 3 – Re-signed by the Philadelphia 76ers to a second 10-day contract
- 1995, April 12 – Released by the Philadelphia 76ers
- 1995, October 6 – Free agent, signed by the Golden State Warriors to a one-year contract
- 1995, October 18 – Released by the Golden State Warriors

== NBA career statistics ==
Legend
GP	Games played	GS	Games started	MPG	Minutes per game
FG%	Field goal percentage	3P%	3-point field goal percentage	FT%	Free throw percentage
RPG	Rebounds per game	APG	Assists per game	SPG	Steals per game
BPG	Blocks per game	PPG	Points per game	**Bold**	Career high

=== Regular season ===
Year	Team	GP	GS	MPG	FG%	3P%	FT%	RPG	APG	SPG	BPG	PPG
1990–91	Portland	43	0	6.7	.474	.000	.568	2.1	.3	.1	.3	3.1
1991–92	Portland	**71**	1	13.2	.493	.000	.752	3.7	.4	**.4**	.2	6.1
1992–93	Milwaukee	12	0	13.3	.464	.000	.750	3.1	**.8**	.2	.3	5.3
1992–93	Boston	63	**52**	**18.3**	.525	.000	**.760**	**4.8**	.3	.3	**.4**	**8.2**
1993–94	Boston	13	0	12.2	.436	.000	.640	3.5	.2	.2	.2	4.9
1994–95	Sacramento	51	0	9.3	**.532**	.000	.571	2.1	.3	.3	.2	5.0
1994–95	Philadelphia	3	0	10.0	.091	.000	.000	2.7	.0	.0	.0	.7
Career		256	53	12.5	.502	.000	.701	3.3	.3	.3	.2	5.7

=== Playoffs ===
Year	Team	GP	GS	MPG	FG%	3P%	FT%	RPG	APG	SPG	BPG	PPG
1991	Portland	5	0	2.6	.333	.000	.000	.6	.0	.0	.0	.8
1992	Portland	**8**	0	3.1	**.500**	.000	**.500**	.5	**.3**	.0	.0	1.5
1993	Boston	4	**4**	**17.0**	.458	.000	.000	**3.3**	**.3**	.0	**.3**	**5.5**
Career		17	4	6.2	.450	.000	.500	1.2	.2	.0	.1	2.2

== Broadcasting career ==
Abdelnaby was approached by the NBA to broadcast the 1995 NBA All-Star Game for an Arabic-language television network as he was the only Arabic speaker in the league. He began broadcasting with Orbit Satellite Television and later worked for other Arabic channels.

Abdelnaby serves as the color analyst for the Philadelphia 76ers, working alongside play-by-play commentator Kate Scott (NBC Sports Philadelphia). He is also a CBS Sports Network college basketball in-studio analyst and provides color commentary for on-site NCAA basketball games. Additionally, Abdelnaby does color commentary for Westwood One Radio.

== Personal life ==
Abdelnaby is a Muslim.
