= Greg Foster (basketball) =

American basketball coach & player

Personal information
- Born: October 3, 1968 (age 58) Oakland, California, U.S.
- Listed height: 6 ft 11 in (2.11 m)
- Listed weight: 250 lb (113 kg)

Career information
- High school: Skyline (Oakland, California)
- College: UCLA (1986–1988); UTEP (1988–1990)
- NBA draft: 1990: 2nd round, 35th overall pick
- Drafted by: Washington Bullets
- Playing career: 1990–2003
- Position: Power forward / center
- Number: 42, 44, 35, 40
- Coaching career: 2013–present

Career history

Playing
- 1990: Breogán
- 1990–1992: Washington Bullets
- 1992–1993: Atlanta Hawks
- 1993: Milwaukee Bucks
- 1993–1994: Papagos Athens
- 1994: Chicago Bulls
- 1994–1995: Minnesota Timberwolves
- 1995–1999: Utah Jazz
- 1999–2000: Seattle SuperSonics
- 2000–2001: Los Angeles Lakers
- 2001–2002: Milwaukee Bucks
- 2002–2003: Toronto Raptors

Coaching
- 2013–2014: Philadelphia 76ers (assistant)
- 2014–2018: Milwaukee Bucks (assistant)
- 2018–2020: Atlanta Hawks (assistant)
- 2020–2021: Indiana Pacers (assistant)

Career highlights
- NBA champion (2001)

Career NBA statistics
- Points: 2,538 (3.9 ppg)
- Rebounds: 1,691 (2.6 rpg)
- Assists: 351 (0.5 apg)
- Stats at NBA.com
- Stats at Basketball Reference

Gregory Clinton Foster (born October 3, 1968) is an American professional basketball coach and former player who last served as assistant coach for the Indiana Pacers of the National Basketball Association (NBA).

== College years ==
Foster was born in Oakland, California and attended Skyline High School where he played alongside future NBA point guard Gary Payton. He began his collegiate basketball career at UCLA, playing for the Bruins his freshman and sophomore years before transferring to UTEP. As a junior in 1988–89, he played alongside future NBA stars Tim Hardaway and Antonio Davis. Foster helped lead the Miners to two WAC titles, and as a senior he averaged 15.0 points and 6.3 rebounds per game.

Foster earned his bachelor's degree in interdisciplinary studies from UTEP in 2011.

== Professional career ==
A 6'11" center–power forward, Foster was selected by the Washington Bullets in the second round (35th overall pick) of the 1990 NBA draft. He spent 13 seasons (1990–2003) in the NBA as a member of the Washington Bullets, Atlanta Hawks, Milwaukee Bucks, Chicago Bulls, Minnesota Timberwolves, Utah Jazz, Seattle SuperSonics, Los Angeles Lakers, and Toronto Raptors. During his long career, mainly spent as a reserve player, he reached the NBA Finals three times (twice with the Jazz and once with the Lakers) and won a championship ring with the Lakers in 2001.

== Coaching career ==
Foster served as an assistant coach at the University of Texas-El Paso.

During the 2013–14 season, he Served as player development coach for the Philadelphia 76ers. From 2014 to 2018 Foster served as assistant coach for the Milwaukee Bucks. On June 8, 2018, the Atlanta Hawks hired Foster as an assistant coach, a position he held for the next season as well.

On November 13, 2020, Foster was hired as an assistant coach by the Indiana Pacers under Nate Bjorkgren.

On May 6, 2021, Foster was suspended one game after an on-court verbal altercation with Pacers player Goga Bitadze.

== Personal life ==
Foster and his wife have a son and two daughters. While in high school, he had the name "Bowie" tattooed on his left shoulder as his friends felt he resembled former NBA center Sam Bowie, who was then playing for the Portland Trail Blazers.

== Career stats ==
Legend
| GP | Games played | GS | Games started | MPG | Minutes per game |
| FG% | Field goal percentage | 3P% | 3-point field goal percentage | FT% | Free throw percentage |
| RPG | Rebounds per game | APG | Assists per game | SPG | Steals per game |
| BPG | Blocks per game | PPG | Points per game | **Bold** | Career high |
| † | Won an NBA championship | * | Led the league |

=== NBA ===
==== Regular season ====
| Year | Team | GP | GS | MPG | FG% | 3P% | FT% | RPG | APG | SPG | BPG | PPG |
|---|---|---|---|---|---|---|---|---|---|---|---|---|
| 1990–91 | Washington | 54 | 3 | 11.2 | .460 | .000 | .689 | 2.8 | .7 | **.2** | .4 | 4.4 |
| 1991–92 | Washington | 49 | 3 | 11.2 | .461 | .000 | .714 | 3.0 | .7 | .1 | .2 | 4.3 |
| 1992–93 | Washington | 10 | 0 | 9.3 | .440 | – | .667 | 2.7 | **1.1** | .0 | **.5** | 2.4 |
| 1992–93 | Atlanta | 33 | 0 | 6.2 | .463 | .000 | .722 | 1.7 | .3 | .1 | .3 | 3.1 |
| 1993–94 | Milwaukee | 3 | 0 | 6.3 | **.571** | – | **1.000** | 1.0 | .0 | .0 | .3 | 3.3 |
| 1994–95 | Chicago | 17 | 3 | 17.6 | .477 | .– | .710 | 3.2 | .9 | .1 | **.5** | **6.1** |
| 1994–95 | Minnesota | 61 | 0 | 13.9 | .470 | .304 | .700 | 3.4 | .4 | **.2** | .3 | 4.6 |
| 1995–96 | Utah | 73 | 2 | 11.0 | .439 | .125 | .847 | 2.4 | .3 | .1 | .3 | 3.8 |
| 1996–97 | Utah | **79** | 12 | 11.6 | .453 | **.667** | .831 | 2.4 | .4 | .1 | .3 | 3.5 |
| 1997–98 | Utah | 78 | **49** | 18.5 | .445 | .222 | .770 | **3.5** | .7 | **.2** | .4 | 5.7 |
| 1998–99 | Utah | 42 | 1 | 10.9 | .377 | .250 | .619 | 2.0 | .6 | .1 | .2 | 2.8 |
| 1999–00 | Seattle | 60 | 5 | 12.0 | .406 | .200 | .643 | 1.8 | .7 | **.2** | .3 | 3.4 |
| 2000–01† | L.A. Lakers | 62 | 8 | 7.3 | .421 | .333 | .714 | 1.8 | .5 | .1 | .2 | 2.0 |
| 2001–02 | Milwaukee | 6 | 0 | 4.0 | .222 | .000 | .750 | 1.3 | .2 | .0 | .0 | 1.2 |
| 2002–03 | Toronto | 29 | 9 | **18.6** | .385 | .250 | .813 | **3.5** | .4 | .0 | .3 | 4.2 |
| Career | | 656 | 95 | 12.2 | .440 | .225 | .748 | 2.6 | .5 | .1 | .3 | 3.9 |

==== Playoffs ====
| Year | Team | GP | GS | MPG | FG% | 3P% | FT% | RPG | APG | SPG | BPG | PPG |
|---|---|---|---|---|---|---|---|---|---|---|---|---|
| 1993 | Atlanta | 1 | 0 | 5.0 | .333 | – | .750 | 1.0 | .0 | .0 | .0 | **5.0** |
| 1996 | Utah | 12 | 0 | 6.3 | **.500** | – | .600 | 1.0 | .2 | .1 | .2 | 2.3 |
| 1997 | Utah | **20*** | 0 | 15.5 | .389 | .250 | .867 | 2.8 | **.6** | **.2** | **.4** | 4.2 |
| 1998 | Utah | **20** | **16** | **16.8** | .453 | **.500** | .600 | **3.4** | .3 | .1 | .3 | 4.1 |
| 1999 | Utah | 8 | 0 | 8.8 | .421 | – | – | 1.0 | .1 | .1 | .0 | 2.0 |
| 2000 | Seattle | 5 | 0 | 13.6 | .368 | .400 | **1.000** | 2.2 | .2 | .0 | .2 | 3.6 |
| 2001† | L.A. Lakers | 1 | 0 | 3.0 | – | – | – | 1.0 | .0 | .0 | .0 | .0 |
| Career | | 67 | 16 | 12.9 | .425 | .333 | .784 | 2.3 | .3 | .1 | .2 | 3.5 |
