= 1992–93 Washington Bullets season =

NBA professional basketball team season

- Head coach: Wes Unseld
- Arena: Capital Centre (37 games); Baltimore Arena (4 games)

Results
- Record: 22–60 (.268)
- Place: Division: 7th (Atlantic); Conference: 14th (Eastern)
- Playoff finish: Did not qualify
- Stats at Basketball Reference

Local media
- Television: WDCA; Home Team Sports
- Radio: WTOP

The 1992–93 Washington Bullets season was the 32nd season for the Washington Bullets in the National Basketball Association, and their 20th season in Washington, D.C..

== Season summary ==
=== Off-season ===
The Bullets received the sixth overall pick in the 1992 NBA draft, and selected power forward Tom Gugliotta out of North Carolina State University. During the off-season, the team acquired rookie power forward, and first-round draft pick Don MacLean out of the University of California, Los Angeles from the Los Angeles Clippers, who had acquired him from the Detroit Pistons, and signed free agents Buck Johnson, and rookie point guard Doug Overton. However, Ledell Eackles would miss the entire season due to weight problems.

=== Regular season ===
With the addition of Gugliotta, the Bullets got off to a 7–10 start to the regular season, but then struggled posting a nine-game losing streak in December, and later on held a 15–36 record at the All-Star break. In January, All-Star forward Bernard King was released to free agency, and later on signed as a free agent with the New Jersey Nets. The team struggled with injuries as Pervis Ellison only played just 49 games due to a knee injury, Rex Chapman only played 60 games due to an ankle injury, and Overton only played just 45 games due to a thumb injury. The Bullets lost ten of their final eleven games of the season, and finished in last place in the Atlantic Division with a 22–60 record; the team missed the NBA playoffs for the fifth consecutive year.

Harvey Grant averaged 18.6 points and 5.7 rebounds per game, while Ellison averaged 17.4 points, 8.8 rebounds and 2.2 blocks per game, and Michael Adams provided the team with 14.8 points, 7.5 assists and 1.4 steals per game. In addition, Gugliotta provided with 14.7 points, 9.6 rebounds, 3.8 assists and 1.7 steals per game, and was named to the NBA All-Rookie First Team, while Chapman contributed 12.5 points per game, and second-year forward Larry Stewart averaged 9.8 points and 4.7 rebounds per game. Meanwhile, second-year guard LaBradford Smith contributed 9.3 points per game, Overton contributed 8.1 points and 3.5 assists per game, Johnson provided with 6.5 points per game, and defensive center Charles Jones averaged 1.3 points, 4.1 rebounds and 1.1 blocks per game.

The Bullets finished 20th in the NBA in home-game attendance, with an attendance of 558,966 at the Capital Centre during the regular season.

=== Notable highlights ===
One notable highlight of the regular season occurred on March 19, 1993, in a road game against the 2-time defending NBA champion Chicago Bulls at the Chicago Stadium. Smith scored a career-high of 37 points against All-Star guard Michael Jordan, and made 15 out of 20 field-goal attempts, while Jordan struggled shooting just 9–27 from the field. However, the Bullets lost to the Bulls, 104–99.

=== Aftermath ===
Following the season, Grant was traded to the Portland Trail Blazers after five seasons with the Bullets, and Johnson, Eackles and Jones were all released to free agency.

== NBA draft ==
Round	Pick	Player	Position	Nationality	College
1	6	Tom Gugliotta	PF	United States	North Carolina State
2	32	Brent Price	PG	United States	Oklahoma

== Roster ==
1992–93 Washington Bullets roster
Players

Pos.	No.	Player	Height	Weight	DOB	From
C	42	Mark Acres	6 ft 11 in (2.11 m)	220 lb (100 kg)	––	Oral Roberts
PG	10	Michael Adams	5 ft 10 in (1.78 m)	162 lb (73 kg)	––	Boston College
SG	3	Rex Chapman	6 ft 4 in (1.93 m)	185 lb (84 kg)	––	Kentucky
SG	21	Ledell Eackles (IN)	6 ft 5 in (1.96 m)	220 lb (100 kg)	––	LSU New Orleans
C	43	Pervis Ellison	6 ft 9 in (2.06 m)	210 lb (95 kg)	––	Louisville
SF	44	Harvey Grant	6 ft 8 in (2.03 m)	195 lb (88 kg)	––	Oklahoma
PF	24	Tom Gugliotta	6 ft 10 in (2.08 m)	240 lb (109 kg)	––	NC State
SF	2	Buck Johnson	6 ft 7 in (2.01 m)	190 lb (86 kg)	––	Alabama
C	23	Charles Jones	6 ft 9 in (2.06 m)	215 lb (98 kg)	––	Albany State
PF	34	Don MacLean	6 ft 10 in (2.08 m)	235 lb (107 kg)	––	UCLA
PG	14	Doug Overton	6 ft 3 in (1.91 m)	190 lb (86 kg)	––	La Salle
PG	20	Brent Price	6 ft 1 in (1.85 m)	165 lb (75 kg)	––	Oklahoma
SG	22	LaBradford Smith	6 ft 3 in (1.91 m)	200 lb (91 kg)	––	Louisville
PF	33	Larry Stewart	6 ft 8 in (2.03 m)	220 lb (100 kg)	––	Coppin State

Coaches
Head coach
- Wes Unseld
Assistant(s)
- Bill Blair
- Jeff Bzdelik

Legend
- (DP) Unsigned draft pick
- (FA) Free agent
- (S) Suspended
- (IN) Inactive
- Injured

Roster

=== Roster Notes ===
- Shooting guard Ledell Eackles was on the injured reserve list due to weight problems, and missed the entire regular season.

== Regular season ==
=== Season standings ===
Atlantic Division	W	L	PCT	GB	Home	Road	Div
y-New York Knicks	60	22	.732	—	37–4	23–18	23–5
x-Boston Celtics	48	34	.585	12	28–13	20–21	19–9
x-New Jersey Nets	43	39	.524	17	26–15	17–24	14–14
Orlando Magic	41	41	.500	19	27–14	14–27	15–13
Miami Heat	36	46	.439	24	26–15	10–31	9–19
Philadelphia 76ers	26	56	.317	34	15–26	11–30	11–17
Washington Bullets	22	60	.268	38	15–26	7–34	7–21

y - clinched division title
x - clinched playoff spot

#	Eastern Conference				
#	Team	W	L	PCT	GB
1	c-New York Knicks	60	22	.732	–
2	y-Chicago Bulls	57	25	.695	3
3	x-Cleveland Cavaliers	54	28	.659	6
4	x-Boston Celtics	48	34	.585	12
5	x-Charlotte Hornets	44	38	.537	16
6	x-New Jersey Nets	43	39	.524	17
7	x-Atlanta Hawks	43	39	.524	17
8	x-Indiana Pacers	41	41	.500	19
9	Orlando Magic	41	41	.500	19
10	Detroit Pistons	40	42	.488	20
11	Miami Heat	36	46	.439	24
12	Milwaukee Bucks	28	54	.341	32
13	Philadelphia 76ers	26	56	.317	36
14	Washington Bullets	22	60	.268	38

z - clinched division title
y - clinched division title
x - clinched playoff spot

== Player statistics ==
Legend
GP	Games played	GS	Games started	MPG	Minutes per game
FG%	Field-goal percentage	3P%	3-point field-goal percentage	FT%	Free-throw percentage
RPG	Rebounds per game	APG	Assists per game	SPG	Steals per game
BPG	Blocks per game	PPG	Points per game

=== Regular season ===
Washington Bullets statistics
Player	GP	GS	MPG	FG%	3P%	FT%	RPG	APG	SPG	BPG	PPG
Mark Acres^{†}	12	7	20.5	.600		.714	5.1	.4	.3	.5	4.8
Michael Adams	70	70	35.7	.439	.321	.856	3.4	7.5	1.4	.1	14.8
Steve Burtt Sr.	4	0	8.8	.385	.333	.800	.8	1.5	.5	.0	7.3
Rex Chapman	60	23	21.7	.477	.371	.810	1.5	1.9	.6	.2	12.5
Chris Corchiani^{†}	1	0	3.0	1.000			.0	.0	.0	.0	2.0
Pervis Ellison	49	48	34.7	.521	.000	.702	8.8	2.4	.9	2.2	17.4
Greg Foster^{†}	10	0	9.3	.440		.667	2.7	1.1	.0	.5	2.4
Harvey Grant	72	72	37.0	.487	.100	.727	5.7	2.8	1.0	.6	18.6
Tom Gugliotta	81	81	34.5	.426	.281	.644	9.6	3.8	1.7	.4	14.7
Byron Irvin	4	2	11.3	.500	1.000	.500	1.0	.5	.3	.0	5.5
Buck Johnson	73	19	17.6	.479	.000	.730	2.7	1.2	.5	.2	6.5
Charles Jones	67	21	18.0	.524	.000	.579	4.1	.6	.6	1.1	1.3
Don MacLean	62	4	10.9	.435	.500	.811	2.0	.6	.2	.1	6.6
Alan Ogg^{†}	3	0	1.0	.500		.500	1.3	.0	.0	.0	1.7
Doug Overton	45	13	22.0	.471	.231	.728	2.4	3.5	.7	.1	8.1
Brent Price	68	9	12.6	.358	.167	.794	1.5	2.3	.8	.0	3.9
Larry Robinson	4	0	8.3	.375	.000	.600	.8	.8	.3	.3	3.8
LaBradford Smith	69	33	22.4	.458	.348	.858	1.5	2.7	.8	.1	9.3
Larry Stewart	81	8	22.5	.543	.000	.727	4.7	1.8	.6	.4	9.8

- ^{†} Denotes player spent time with another team in the season. Stats reflect time with the Bullets only.

Player statistics citation:

== Awards and records ==
- Tom Gugliotta, NBA All-Rookie Team 1st Team

== See also ==
- 1992–93 NBA season
