= 1992–93 New York Knicks season =

Season of National Basketball Association team the New York Knicks

- Division champions
- Head coach: Pat Riley
- General manager: Ernie Grunfeld
- Owners: Paramount Communications, Inc.
- Arena: Madison Square Garden

Results
- Record: 60–22 (.732)
- Place: Division: 1st (Atlantic); Conference: 1st (Eastern)
- Playoff finish: Eastern Conference finals (lost to Bulls 2–4)
- Stats at Basketball Reference

Local media
- Television: MSG Network
- Radio: WFAN

The 1992–93 New York Knicks season was the 47th season for the team in the National Basketball Association.

== Season summary ==
=== Off-season ===
During the off-season, the Knicks acquired Charles D. Smith, Doc Rivers and Bo Kimble from the Los Angeles Clippers, acquired All-Star guard Rolando Blackman from the Dallas Mavericks, and Tony Campbell from the Minnesota Timberwolves, and later signed free agent Herb Williams in November. The team also selected shooting guard Hubert Davis from the University of North Carolina with the 20th overall pick in the 1992 NBA draft.

For the season, the Knicks redesigned their primary logo; the team added a silver triangle with a blue outline, behind a redesigned text of the team name "Knicks" in orange letters with blue and black shadows, and an orange basketball with blue seams. The team also slightly updated their home and road uniforms, replacing the previous Knicks logo with the newer logo on the right leg of their shorts. The Knicks' new primary logo would remain in use until 1995, where they would add the city name "New York" in blue letters above their logo; the updated uniforms would last until 1997.

=== Regular season ===
With the addition of Smith, Rivers, Blackman, and Davis, the Knicks got off to a 4–4 start to the regular season, but then won 12 of their next 15 games. The team posted a seven-game winning streak in February, and held a 34–16 record at the All-Star break. The Knicks finished the season by winning 24 of their final 28 games, including a nine-game winning streak in March and five straight victories to end the season. The Knicks won the Atlantic Division title with a 60–22 record, which earned them the first seed in the Eastern Conference, and qualified for the NBA playoffs for the sixth consecutive year; the team also posted a successful 37–4 home record at Madison Square Garden during the regular season.

Head coach Pat Riley was named the NBA Coach of the Year for the second time, while Patrick Ewing averaged 24.2 points, 12.1 rebounds and 2.0 blocks per game, and was named to the All-NBA Second Team. In addition, John Starks became the team's starting shooting guard, averaging 17.5 points and 5.1 assists per game, and leading the Knicks with 108 three-point field goals, as he was named to the NBA All-Defensive Second Team, and Smith, who switched from the power forward position to small forward under Riley's request, provided the team with 12.4 points and 5.3 rebounds per game. Meanwhile, sixth man Anthony Mason averaged 10.3 points and 7.9 rebounds per game off the bench, while Blackman contributed 9.7 points per game, and Rivers provided the team with 7.8 points, 5.3 assists and 1.6 steals per game. Campbell contributed 7.7 points per game, Charles Oakley averaged 6.9 points and 8.6 rebounds per game, and second-year guard Greg Anthony provided the Knicks with 6.6 points, 5.7 assists, and 1.6 steals per game.

During the NBA All-Star weekend at the Delta Center in Salt Lake City, Utah, Ewing was selected for the 1993 NBA All-Star Game, as a member of the Eastern Conference All-Star team, while Riley was selected to coach the Eastern Conference. Ewing also finished in fourth place in Most Valuable Player voting, while Starks finished in fourth place in Most Improved Player voting, and Mason finished tied in second place in Sixth Man of the Year voting, behind Clifford Robinson of the Portland Trail Blazers; Ewing, Starks and Oakley all finished tied in fifth place in Defensive Player of the Year voting.

The Knicks finished fourth in the NBA in home-game attendance, with an attendance of 804,840 at Madison Square Garden during the regular season.

=== NBA playoffs ===
In the Eastern Conference First Round of the 1993 NBA playoffs, the Knicks faced off against the 8th–seeded Indiana Pacers, a team that featured Reggie Miller, All-Star forward Detlef Schrempf, and Rik Smits. The Knicks won their first two home games at Madison Square Garden, before losing Game 3 to the Pacers on the road, 116–93 at Market Square Arena; the Knicks won Game 4 over the Pacers on the road in overtime, 109–100, to win the series in four games, and advance to the Eastern Conference Semi-finals.

In the Semi-finals, the team then faced off against the 5th–seeded Charlotte Hornets, who were led by the trio of All-Star forward Larry Johnson, rookie center Alonzo Mourning, and Muggsy Bogues. The Knicks took a 2–0 series lead before losing Game 3 to the Hornets on the road in double-overtime, 110–106 at the Charlotte Coliseum. After winning Game 4 on the road, 94–92, the Knicks returned to Madison Square Garden to defeat the Hornets in Game 5, 105–101, to win the series in five games, and gain a spot in the Eastern Conference Finals.

In the Conference Finals, the Knicks faced off against the 2nd–seeded, and 2-time defending NBA champion Chicago Bulls, who won the Central Division title, and were led by the trio of All-Star guard Michael Jordan, All-Star forward Scottie Pippen, and Horace Grant; the Bulls had eliminated the Knicks from the NBA playoffs in three of the previous four years. With home-court advantage in the series, the Knicks took a 2–0 series lead, but then lost the next two road games to the Bulls at Chicago Stadium. The Knicks returned to Madison Square Garden for Game 5, in which they lost to the Bulls, 97–94, then lost Game 6 on the road, 96–88, thus losing the series in six games to end their season.

The Bulls would go on to defeat the Phoenix Suns in six games in the 1993 NBA Finals, winning their third consecutive NBA championship.

=== Notable incidents ===
One notable incident of the regular season occurred on March 23, 1993, during a road game against the Suns at the America West Arena. A brawl occurred when Suns guard Kevin Johnson ran into Rivers at the end of the first half; Rivers chased Johnson in retaliation, and Anthony, who was dressed in street clothes because of a sprained ankle, came off the Knicks' bench and punched Johnson. Anthony was fined $20,500 and suspended for five games, while Johnson was fined $15,000 and suspended for two games, and Rivers was fined $10,000 and suspended for two games. The Knicks lost to the Suns by a score of 121–92.

=== Aftermath ===
Following the season, Kimble was released to free agency, and left to play overseas in France; Kimble had previously been selected by the Los Angeles Clippers with the eighth overall pick in the 1990 NBA draft, after a successful college career at Loyola Marymount, where he averaged 35.3 points per game during the 1989–90 season. However, he failed to live up to expectations after three seasons in the NBA.

== NBA draft ==
Round	Pick	Player	Position	Nationality	School/Club team
1	20	Hubert Davis	SG	United States	North Carolina

== Roster ==
1992–93 New York Knicks roster
Players

Pos.	No.	Player	Height	Weight	DOB	From
PF	42	Eric Anderson	6 ft 9 in (2.06 m)	220 lb (100 kg)	1970–05–26	Indiana
PG	50	Greg Anthony	6 ft 0 in (1.83 m)	176 lb (80 kg)	1967–11–15	UNLV
SG	20	Rolando Blackman	6 ft 6 in (1.98 m)	190 lb (86 kg)	1959–02–26	Kansas State
SF	9	Tony Campbell	6 ft 7 in (2.01 m)	215 lb (98 kg)	1962–05–07	Ohio State
SG	44	Hubert Davis	6 ft 5 in (1.96 m)	183 lb (83 kg)	1970–05–17	North Carolina
C	33	Patrick Ewing	7 ft 0 in (2.13 m)	240 lb (109 kg)	1962–08–05	Georgetown
SG	16	Bo Kimble	6 ft 4 in (1.93 m)	190 lb (86 kg)	1966–04–09	Loyola Marymount
SF	14	Anthony Mason	6 ft 7 in (2.01 m)	250 lb (113 kg)	1966–12–14	Tennessee State
C	40	Tim McCormick (injured) (IN)	6 ft 11 in (2.11 m)	240 lb (109 kg)	1962–03–10	Michigan
PF	34	Charles Oakley	6 ft 8 in (2.03 m)	225 lb (102 kg)	1963–12–18	Virginia Union
PG	25	Doc Rivers	6 ft 4 in (1.93 m)	185 lb (84 kg)	1961–10–13	Marquette
PF	54	Charles D. Smith	6 ft 10 in (2.08 m)	230 lb (104 kg)	1965–07–16	Pittsburgh
SG	3	John Starks	6 ft 3 in (1.91 m)	180 lb (82 kg)	1965–08–10	Oklahoma State
C	32	Herb Williams	6 ft 10 in (2.08 m)	242 lb (110 kg)	1958–02–16	Ohio State

Coaches
Head coach
- Pat Riley
Assistant(s)
- Dick Harter
- Jeff Nix
- Bob Salmi
- Jeff Van Gundy

Legend
- (DP) Unsigned draft pick
- (FA) Free agent
- (S) Suspended
- Injured

Roster
Updated: November 15, 1992

=== Roster notes ===
- Center Tim McCormick was on the injured reserve list due to surgery on his right knee, and missed the entire regular season.

== Regular season ==
=== Season standings ===
Atlantic Division	W	L	PCT	GB	Home	Road	Div
y-New York Knicks	60	22	.732	—	37–4	23–18	23–5
x-Boston Celtics	48	34	.585	12	28–13	20–21	19–9
x-New Jersey Nets	43	39	.524	17	26–15	17–24	14–14
Orlando Magic	41	41	.500	19	27–14	14–27	15–13
Miami Heat	36	46	.439	24	26–15	10–31	9–19
Philadelphia 76ers	26	56	.317	34	15–26	11–30	11–17
Washington Bullets	22	60	.268	38	15–26	7–34	7–21

y – clinched division title
x – clinched playoff spot

#	Eastern Conference				
#	Team	W	L	PCT	GB
1	c-New York Knicks	60	22	.732	–
2	y-Chicago Bulls	57	25	.695	3
3	x-Cleveland Cavaliers	54	28	.659	6
4	x-Boston Celtics	48	34	.585	12
5	x-Charlotte Hornets	44	38	.537	16
6	x-New Jersey Nets	43	39	.524	17
7	x-Atlanta Hawks	43	39	.524	17
8	x-Indiana Pacers	41	41	.500	19
9	Orlando Magic	41	41	.500	19
10	Detroit Pistons	40	42	.488	20
11	Miami Heat	36	46	.439	24
12	Milwaukee Bucks	28	54	.341	32
13	Philadelphia 76ers	26	56	.317	36
14	Washington Bullets	22	60	.268	38

z – clinched division title
y – clinched division title
x – clinched playoff spot

== Game log ==
=== Regular season ===
1992–93 game log
Total: 60–22 (Home: 37–4; Road: 23–18)
November: 8–5 (home: 6–0; road: 2–5)

Game	Date	Team	Score	High points	High rebounds	High assists	Location Attendance	Record
1	November 6, 1992	@ Atlanta	W 106–94				The Omni	1–0
2	November 7, 1992	Philadelphia	W 89–85				Madison Square Garden	2–0
3	November 10, 1992	New Jersey	W 99–96				Madison Square Garden	3–0
4	November 13, 1992	@ Washington	L 104–106				Capital Centre	3–1
5	November 14, 1992	Boston	W 85–80				Madison Square Garden	4–1
6	November 16, 1992	@ Portland	L 94–109				Memorial Coliseum	4–2
7	November 17, 1992	@ Seattle	L 90–100				Seattle Center Coliseum	4–3
8	November 19, 1992	@ L.A. Clippers	L 91–101				Los Angeles Memorial Sports Arena	4–4
9	November 21, 1992	Orlando	W 92–77				Madison Square Garden	5–4
10	November 24, 1992	Washington	W 98–88				Madison Square Garden	6–4
11	November 25, 1992	@ Minnesota	W 99–78				Target Center	7–4
12	November 28, 1992; 1:00 p.m. EST	Chicago	W 112–75	Ewing (26)	Oakley (16)	Rivers (7)	Madison Square Garden; 19,763	8–4
13	November 29, 1992	@ Detroit	L 76–92				The Palace of Auburn Hills	8–5

December: 10–4 (home: 7–1; road: 3–3)

Game	Date	Team	Score	High points	High rebounds	High assists	Location Attendance	Record
14	December 1, 1992	Portland	W 101–85				Madison Square Garden	9–5
15	December 3, 1992	@ Cleveland	L 90–100				Richfield Coliseum	9–6
16	December 5, 1992	Milwaukee	W 111–98				Madison Square Garden	10–6
17	December 8, 1992	Seattle	W 100–88				Madison Square Garden	11–6
18	December 10, 1992	Charlotte	L 103–110 (OT)				Madison Square Garden	11–7
19	December 12, 1992	Detroit	W 95–88				Madison Square Garden	12–7
20	December 14, 1992	Denver	W 106–89				Madison Square Garden	13–7
21	December 15, 1992	@ New Jersey	W 108–94				Brendan Byrne Arena	14–7
22	December 18, 1992	@ Boston	W 113–87				Boston Garden	15–7
23	December 19, 1992	Miami	W 91–87				Madison Square Garden	16–7
24	December 25, 1992; 9:00 p.m. EST	@ Chicago	L 77–89	Blackman, Starks (17)	Ewing, Mason (15)	Anthony (6)	Chicago Stadium; 18,676	16–8
25	December 26, 1992	@ Milwaukee	L 100–102 (OT)				Bradley Center	16–9
26	December 29, 1992	Indiana	W 97–91				Madison Square Garden	17–9
27	December 30, 1992	@ Indiana	W 94–90				Market Square Arena	18–9

January: 7–7 (home: 4–3; road: 3–4)

Game	Date	Team	Score	High points	High rebounds	High assists	Location Attendance	Record
28	January 2, 1993	L.A. Clippers	L 97–98 (OT)				Madison Square Garden	18–10
29	January 5, 1993	Cleveland	W 95–91				Madison Square Garden	19–10
30	January 8, 1993	@ Orlando	L 94–95				Orlando Arena	19–11
31	January 10, 1993	Boston	L 97–100				Madison Square Garden	19–12
32	January 12, 1993	@ Sacramento	W 104–93				ARCO Arena	20–12
33	January 13, 1993	@ Denver	L 92–108				McNichols Sports Garden	20–13
34	January 15, 1993	@ Dallas	W 107–93				Reunion Arena	21–13
35	January 16, 1993	@ Houston	L 102–104				The Summit	21–14
36	January 18, 1993; 1:00 p.m. EST	Phoenix	W 106–103	Ewing (35)	Ewing, Mason (11)	Rivers (9)	Madison Square Garden; 19,763	22–14
37	January 20, 1993	Charlotte	W 114–91				Madison Square Garden	23–14
38	January 22, 1993	@ Philadelphia	W 109–91				The Spectrum	24–14
39	January 26, 1993	Philadelphia	W 98–90				Madison Square Garden	25–14
40	January 28, 1993	Atlanta	L 105–110				Madison Square Garden	25–15

February: 11–3 (home: 6–0; road: 5–3)

Game	Date	Team	Score	High points	High rebounds	High assists	Location Attendance	Record
41	February 2, 1993	Washington	W 105–100				Madison Square Garden	26–15
42	February 4, 1993	Golden State	W 105–101				Madison Square Garden	27–15
43	February 5, 1993	@ Miami	W 104–82				Miami Arena	28–15
44	February 7, 1993	Miami	W 104–82				Madison Square Garden	29–15
45	February 8, 1993	@ Philadelphia	W 120–115 (OT)				The Spectrum	30–15
46	February 11, 1993	Houston	W 125–95				Madison Square Garden	31–15
47	February 12, 1993; 8:00 p.m. EST	@ Chicago	W 104–98	Ewing (36)	Ewing (15)	Starks (7)	Chicago Stadium; 18,676	32–15
48	February 14, 1993	@ Orlando	L 100–102 (3OT)				Orlando Arena	32–16
49	February 16, 1993	Dallas	W 117–87				Madison Square Garden	33–16
50	February 17, 1993	@ Charlotte	W 124–116				Charlotte Coliseum	34–16
All-Star Break
51	February 23, 1993	Minnesota	W 95–91				Madison Square Garden	35–16
52	February 24, 1993	@ Milwaukee	W 91–90				Bradley Center	36–16
53	February 26, 1993	@ Detroit	L 80–108				The Palace of Auburn Hills	36–17
54	February 28, 1993	@ New Jersey	L 76–102				Brendan Byrne Arena	36–18

March: 11–2 (home: 7–0; road: 4–2)

Game	Date	Team	Score	High points	High rebounds	High assists	Location Attendance	Record
55	March 2, 1993	Atlanta	W 107–98				Madison Square Garden	37–18
56	March 4, 1993	Utah	W 125–111				Madison Square Garden	38–18
57	March 8, 1993	Orlando	W 109–107 (OT)				Madison Square Garden	39–18
58	March 10, 1993	L.A. Lakers	W 110–104				Madison Square Garden	40–18
59	March 12, 1993	@ Washington	W 109–98				Capital Centre	41–18
60	March 14, 1993	Indiana	W 121–90				Madison Square Garden	42–18
61	March 16, 1993	Milwaukee	W 102–99				Madison Square Garden	43–18
62	March 18, 1993	@ Cleveland	W 115–95				Richfield Coliseum	44–18
63	March 21, 1993	San Antonio	W 115–96				Madison Square Garden	45–18
64	March 23, 1993; 9:30 p.m. EST	@ Phoenix	L 92–121	Ewing (24)	Oakley (10)	Davis (6)	America West Arena; 19,023	45–19
65	March 25, 1993	@ Utah	L 87–104				Delta Center	45–20
66	March 26, 1993	@ L.A. Lakers	W 105–95				Great Western Forum	46–20
67	March 28, 1993	@ Golden State	W 94–84				Oakland-Alameda County Coliseum Arena	47–20
68	March 30, 1993	Sacramento	W 109–87				Madison Square Garden	48–20

April: 12–2 (home: 6–0; road: 6–2)

Game	Date	Team	Score	High points	High rebounds	High assists	Location Attendance	Record
69	April 1, 1993	Cleveland	W 91–83				Madison Square Garden	49–20
70	April 2, 1993	@ Miami	W 123–107				Miami Arena	50–20
71	April 4, 1993	@ San Antonio	W 108–103 (OT)				HemisFair Arena	51–20
72	April 6, 1993	@ Atlanta	L 104–109 (OT)				The Omni	51–21
73	April 8, 1993	Boston	W 110–88				Madison Square Garden	52–21
74	April 11, 1993	@ Boston	W 102–90				Boston Garden	53–21
75	April 13, 1993	Washington	W 93–85				Madison Square Garden	54–21
76	April 14, 1993	@ Charlotte	W 111–107				Charlotte Coliseum	55–21
77	April 16, 1993	@ Indiana	L 94–100				Market Square Arena	55–22
78	April 17, 1993	Detroit	W 95–85				Madison Square Garden	56–22
79	April 20, 1993	@ Miami	W 109–97				Miami Arena	57–22
80	April 21, 1993	New Jersey	W 105–74				Madison Square Garden	58–22
81	April 23, 1993	@ Philadelphia	W 99–84				The Spectrum	59–22
82	April 25, 1993; 1:00 p.m. EDT	Chicago	W 89–84	Ewing, Starks (22)	Ewing (12)	Rivers (7)	Madison Square Garden; 19,763	60–22

1992–93 schedule

== Playoffs ==
1993 playoff game log
First Round: 3–1 (home: 2–0; road: 1–1)

Game	Date	Team	Score	High points	High rebounds	High assists	Location Attendance	Series
1	April 30, 1993	Indiana	W 107–104	Patrick Ewing (25)	Ewing, Oakley (9)	Oakley, Starks (6)	Madison Square Garden; 19,763	1–0
2	May 2, 1993	Indiana	W 101–91	John Starks (29)	Charles Oakley (12)	Doc Rivers (13)	Madison Square Garden; 19,763	2–0
3	May 4, 1993	@ Indiana	L 93–116	Patrick Ewing (19)	Patrick Ewing (13)	Doc Rivers (7)	Market Square Arena; 11,380	2–1
4	May 6, 1993	@ Indiana	W 109–100 (OT)	Patrick Ewing (28)	Ewing, Oakley (13)	Doc Rivers (11)	Market Square Arena; 13,059	3–1

Conference semifinals: 4–1 (home: 3–0; road: 1–1)

Game	Date	Team	Score	High points	High rebounds	High assists	Location Attendance	Series
1	May 9, 1993	Charlotte	W 111–95	Patrick Ewing (33)	Ewing, Oakley (10)	John Starks (12)	Madison Square Garden; 19,763	1–0
2	May 12, 1993	Charlotte	W 105–101 (OT)	Patrick Ewing (34)	Charles Oakley (16)	Doc Rivers (7)	Madison Square Garden; 19,763	2–0
3	May 14, 1993	@ Charlotte	L 106–110 (2OT)	Patrick Ewing (26)	Patrick Ewing (14)	John Starks (8)	Charlotte Coliseum; 23,698	2–1
4	May 16, 1993	@ Charlotte	W 94–92	Patrick Ewing (28)	Patrick Ewing (10)	Doc Rivers (8)	Charlotte Coliseum; 23,698	3–1
5	May 18, 1993	Charlotte	W 105–101	Charles Oakley (21)	Charles Oakley (11)	John Starks (9)	Madison Square Garden; 19,763	4–1

Eastern Conference Finals: 2–4 (home: 2–1; road: 0–3)

Game	Date	Team	Score	High points	High rebounds	High assists	Location Attendance	Series
1	May 23, 1993; 3:30 p.m. EDT	Chicago	W 98–90	Ewing, Starks (25)	Ewing (17)	Rivers (5)	Madison Square Garden; 19,763	1–0
2	May 25, 1993; 8:00 p.m. EDT	Chicago	W 96–91	Ewing (26)	Oakley (16)	Starks (9)	Madison Square Garden; 19,763	2–0
3	May 29, 1993; 3:30 p.m. EDT	@ Chicago	L 83–103	Ewing (21)	Ewing (9)	Anthony, Ewing (5)	Chicago Stadium; 18,676	2–1
4	May 31, 1993; 3:30 p.m. EDT	@ Chicago	L 95–105	Ewing, Starks (24)	Oakley (12)	Starks (7)	Chicago Stadium; 18,676	2–2
5	June 2, 1993; 9:00 p.m. EDT	Chicago	L 94–97	Ewing (33)	Ewing (9)	Starks (8)	Madison Square Garden; 19,763	2–3
6	June 4, 1993; 9:00 p.m. EDT	@ Chicago	L 88–96	Ewing (26)	Ewing (13)	Rivers (8)	Chicago Stadium; 18,676	2–4

1993 schedule

== Player statistics ==
Legend
GP	Games played	GS	Games started	MPG	Minutes per game
FG%	Field-goal percentage	3P%	3-point field-goal percentage	FT%	Free-throw percentage
RPG	Rebounds per game	APG	Assists per game	SPG	Steals per game
BPG	Blocks per game	PPG	Points per game

=== Regular season ===
Player	GP	GS	MPG	FG%	3P%	FT%	RPG	APG	SPG	BPG	PPG
Eric Anderson	16	0	2.8	.278		.846	.9	.2	.2	.1	1.3
Greg Anthony	70	35	24.3	.415	.133	.673	2.4	5.7	1.6	.2	6.6
Rolando Blackman	60	33	23.9	.443	.425	.789	1.7	2.6	.4	.2	9.7
Tony Campbell	58	13	18.3	.490	.400	.678	2.7	1.1	.6	.1	7.7
Hubert Davis	50	2	16.3	.438	.316	.796	1.1	1.7	.4	.1	5.4
Patrick Ewing	81	81	37.1	.503	.143	.719	12.1	1.9	.9	2.0	24.2
Bo Kimble	9	0	6.1	.424	.250	.375	1.2	.6	.1	.0	3.7
Anthony Mason	81	0	30.6	.502		.682	7.9	2.1	.5	.2	10.3
Charles Oakley	82	82	27.2	.508	.000	.722	8.6	1.5	1.0	.2	6.9
Doc Rivers	77	45	24.5	.437	.317	.821	2.5	5.3	1.6	.1	7.8
Charles Smith	81	68	26.8	.469	.000	.782	5.3	1.8	.6	1.2	12.4
John Starks	80	51	31.0	.428	.321	.795	2.6	5.1	1.1	.2	17.5
Herb Williams	55	0	10.4	.411		.667	2.7	.3	.4	.5	2.9

=== Playoffs ===
Player	GP	GS	MPG	FG%	3P%	FT%	RPG	APG	SPG	BPG	PPG
Eric Anderson	2	0	3.0	.500			.5	.0	.0	.0	1.0
Greg Anthony	15	0	16.0	.400	.214	.571	2.0	3.5	.9	.1	3.9
Rolando Blackman	15	0	14.3	.344	.267	.833	1.1	1.1	.2	.1	4.2
Tony Campbell	2	0	16.5	.400	.000	.750	2.0	1.0	.5	.0	7.0
Hubert Davis	7	0	13.7	.560	.500	.667	.9	.7	.9	.0	4.4
Patrick Ewing	15	15	40.3	.512	1.000	.638	10.9	2.4	1.1	2.1	25.5
Anthony Mason	15	0	34.0	.590		.632	7.3	2.7	.7	.4	12.5
Charles Oakley	15	15	33.8	.481		.727	11.0	1.1	1.1	.1	11.1
Doc Rivers	15	15	30.5	.453	.355	.767	2.6	5.7	1.9	.1	10.2
Charles Smith	15	15	25.9	.471		.740	4.0	1.3	.6	.9	11.1
John Starks	15	15	38.3	.440	.373	.717	3.5	6.4	1.0	.2	16.5
Herb Williams	7	0	9.9	.357		1.000	2.0	.3	.1	.6	2.0

- ^{†} Denotes player spent time with another team in the season. Stats reflect time with the Knicks only.

Player statistics citation:

== Awards and records ==
- Pat Riley, NBA Coach of the Year Award
- Patrick Ewing, All-NBA Second Team
- John Starks, NBA All-Defensive Second Team
