= 1992–93 Atlanta Hawks season =

NBA professional basketball team season

- Head coach: Bob Weiss
- General manager: Pete Babcock
- Owners: Ted Turner / Turner Broadcasting System
- Arena: Omni Coliseum

Results
- Record: 43–39 (.524)
- Place: Division: 4th (Central); Conference: 7th (Eastern)
- Playoff finish: First round (lost to Bulls 0–3)
- Stats at Basketball Reference

Local media
- Television: WTBS; WGNX; SportSouth; TBS
- Radio: WCNN

The 1992–93 Atlanta Hawks season was the 44th season for the Atlanta Hawks in the National Basketball Association, and their 25th season in Atlanta, Georgia.

== Season summary ==
=== Off-season ===
The Hawks received the tenth overall pick in the 1992 NBA draft, and selected power forward Adam Keefe out of Stanford University. During the off-season, the team acquired Mookie Blaylock and Roy Hinson from the New Jersey Nets; however, Hinson never played for the Hawks due to knee injuries he sustained with the Nets, in which he last played in the NBA during the 1990–91 season.

For the season, the Hawks redesigned their home and road uniforms; the team added side panels to the left side of their jerseys and shorts, the jersey number on the left leg of their shorts, and the team's primary logo on the right leg. The white home uniforms featured a yellow and red trim, and red side panels with black and yellow outlines, while the red road uniforms featured a yellow and white trim, and white side panels. The team's new home and road uniforms would both remain in use until 1995.

=== Regular season ===
With the addition of Blaylock and Keefe, and with Dominique Wilkins back after missing half of the previous season due to a ruptured Achilles tendon, the Hawks lost five of their first seven games of the regular season, but managed to defeat the 2-time defending NBA champion Chicago Bulls on the road, 100–99 at the Chicago Stadium on November 7, 1992. The team played around 500. in winning percentage for the first half of the season, holding a 24–27 record at the All-Star break. After holding a 26–31 record as of March 4, 1993, the Hawks won 12 of their next 13 games while posting a 12–3 record in March, and two six-game winning streaks that month. The Hawks finished in fourth place in the Central Division with a 43–39 record, earning the seventh seed in the Eastern Conference, and returning to the NBA playoffs after a one-year absence.

Wilkins averaged 29.9 points and 6.8 rebounds per game, led the Hawks with 120 three-point field goals, and was named to the All-NBA Second Team. In addition, Kevin Willis averaged 17.9 points and 12.9 rebounds per game, while second-year guard Stacey Augmon contributed 14.0 points per game, and Blaylock provided the team with 13.4 points, 8.4 assists and 2.5 steals per game, along with 118 three-point field goals. Off the bench, Duane Ferrell provided with 10.2 points per game, while second-year guard Paul Graham contributed 8.1 points per game, Keefe averaged 6.6 points and 5.3 rebounds per game, and starting center Jon Koncak provided with 3.5 points, 5.5 rebounds and 1.3 blocks per game.

During the NBA All-Star weekend at the Delta Center in Salt Lake City, Utah, Wilkins was selected for the 1993 NBA All-Star Game, as a member of the Eastern Conference All-Star team. Wilkins surpassed Bob Pettit as the Hawks all-time scoring leader during the regular season, and also finished in fifth place in Most Valuable Player voting, while Blaylock finished tied in eleventh place in Most Improved Player voting.

The Hawks finished last in the NBA in home-game attendance, with an attendance of 491,229 at the Omni Coliseum during the regular season, which was 27th in the league.

=== NBA playoffs ===
In the Eastern Conference First Round of the 1993 NBA playoffs, the Hawks faced off against the 2nd–seeded, and Central Division champion Bulls, who were led by the trio of All-Star guard Michael Jordan, All-Star forward Scottie Pippen, and Horace Grant. The Hawks lost the first two games to the Bulls on the road at the Chicago Stadium, before losing Game 3 at home, 98–88 at the Omni Coliseum, in which Jordan scored 39 points despite a sprained right ankle injury; the Hawks lost the series to the Bulls in a three-game sweep.

The Bulls would go on to defeat the Phoenix Suns in six games in the 1993 NBA Finals, winning their third consecutive NBA championship.

=== Aftermath ===
This was also Wilkins' final full season with the Hawks, as he would later on be traded to the Los Angeles Clippers midway through the following season. Meanwhile, head coach Bob Weiss was fired after three seasons with the Hawks, and Travis Mays was released to free agency.

== Draft picks ==
Round	Pick	Player	Position	Nationality	College
1	10	Adam Keefe	PF/SF	United States	Stanford
2	38	Elmer Bennett	PG	United States	Notre Dame

== Roster ==
1992–93 Atlanta Hawks roster
Players

Pos.	No.	Player	Height	Weight	DOB	From
G/F	2	Stacey Augmon	6 ft 8 in (2.03 m)	205 lb (93 kg)	1968–08–01	UNLV
G	10	Mookie Blaylock	6 ft 0 in (1.83 m)	180 lb (82 kg)	1967–03–20	Oklahoma
C	45	Randy Breuer	7 ft 3 in (2.21 m)	230 lb (104 kg)	1960–10–11	Minnesota
F	33	Duane Ferrell	6 ft 7 in (2.01 m)	208 lb (94 kg)	1965–02–28	Georgia Tech
C	44	Greg Foster	6 ft 11 in (2.11 m)	240 lb (109 kg)	1968–10–03	UTEP
G	25	Paul Graham	6 ft 6 in (1.98 m)	200 lb (91 kg)	1967–11–28	Ohio
G	12	Steve Henson	5 ft 11 in (1.80 m)	177 lb (80 kg)	1968–02–02	Kansas State
F	31	Adam Keefe	6 ft 9 in (2.06 m)	230 lb (104 kg)	1970–02–22	Stanford
C	32	Jon Koncak	7 ft 0 in (2.13 m)	250 lb (113 kg)	1963–05–17	SMU
G	1	Travis Mays	6 ft 2 in (1.88 m)	190 lb (86 kg)	1968–06–19	Texas
C	41	Blair Rasmussen (injured)	7 ft 0 in (2.13 m)	250 lb (113 kg)	1962–11–13	Oregon
F	21	Dominique Wilkins	6 ft 7 in (2.01 m)	200 lb (91 kg)	1960–01–12	Georgia
F/C	42	Kevin Willis	7 ft 0 in (2.13 m)	220 lb (100 kg)	1962–09–08	Michigan State

Coaches
Head coach
- Bob Weiss
Assistant(s)
- Johnny Davis
- Bob Weinhaur

Legend
- (DP) Unsigned draft pick
- (FA) Free agent
- (S) Suspended
- (IN) Inactive
- Injured

=== Roster Notes ===
- Power forward Roy Hinson was on the injured reserve list due to a knee injury, missed the entire regular season, and never played for the Hawks.

== Regular season ==
=== Season standings ===
Central Division	W	L	PCT	GB	Home	Road	Div
y-Chicago Bulls	57	25	.695	—	31–10	26–15	19–9
x-Cleveland Cavaliers	54	28	.659	3	35–6	19–22	22–6
x-Charlotte Hornets	44	38	.537	13	22–19	22–19	12–16
x-Atlanta Hawks	43	39	.524	14	25–16	18–23	12–16
x-Indiana Pacers	41	41	.500	16	27–14	14–27	11–17
Detroit Pistons	40	42	.488	17	28–13	12–29	12–16
Milwaukee Bucks	28	54	.341	29	18–23	10–31	10–18

y - clinched division title
x - clinched playoff spot

#	Eastern Conference				
#	Team	W	L	PCT	GB
1	c-New York Knicks	60	22	.732	–
2	y-Chicago Bulls	57	25	.695	3
3	x-Cleveland Cavaliers	54	28	.659	6
4	x-Boston Celtics	48	34	.585	12
5	x-Charlotte Hornets	44	38	.537	16
6	x-New Jersey Nets	43	39	.524	17
7	x-Atlanta Hawks	43	39	.524	17
8	x-Indiana Pacers	41	41	.500	19
9	Orlando Magic	41	41	.500	19
10	Detroit Pistons	40	42	.488	20
11	Miami Heat	36	46	.439	24
12	Milwaukee Bucks	28	54	.341	32
13	Philadelphia 76ers	26	56	.317	36
14	Washington Bullets	22	60	.268	38

z - clinched division title
y - clinched division title
x - clinched playoff spot

=== Game log ===
1992–93 game log
November

Game	Date	Team	Score	High points	High rebounds	High assists	Location Attendance	Record

December

Game	Date	Team	Score	High points	High rebounds	High assists	Location Attendance	Record

January

Game	Date	Team	Score	High points	High rebounds	High assists	Location Attendance	Record

February

Game	Date	Team	Score	High points	High rebounds	High assists	Location Attendance	Record

March

Game	Date	Team	Score	High points	High rebounds	High assists	Location Attendance	Record

April

Game	Date	Team	Score	High points	High rebounds	High assists	Location Attendance	Record

1992–93 schedule

== Playoffs ==
1993 playoff game log
First round: 0–3 (home: 0–1; road: 0–2)

Game	Date	Team	Score	High points	High rebounds	High assists	Location Attendance	Series
1	April 30	@ Chicago	L 90–114	Dominique Wilkins (24)	three players tied (5)	Mookie Blaylock (5)	Chicago Stadium; 18,676	0–1
2	May 2	@ Chicago	L 102–117	Dominique Wilkins (37)	Kevin Willis (13)	Dominique Wilkins (5)	Chicago Stadium; 18,676	0–2
3	May 4	Chicago	L 88–98	Dominique Wilkins (29)	Jon Koncak (9)	Mookie Blaylock (6)	Omni Coliseum; 15,141	0–3

1993 schedule

== Player statistics ==
Legend
GP	Games played	GS	Games started	MPG	Minutes per game
FG%	Field-goal percentage	3P%	3-point field-goal percentage	FT%	Free-throw percentage
RPG	Rebounds per game	APG	Assists per game	SPG	Steals per game
BPG	Blocks per game	PPG	Points per game

=== Season ===
Player	GP	GS	MPG	FG%	3P%	FT%	RPG	APG	SPG	BPG	PPG
Dominique Wilkins	71	70	37.3	46.8	38.0	82.8	6.8	3.2	1.0	0.4	29.9
Kevin Willis	80	80	36.0	50.6	24.1	65.3	12.9	2.1	0.9	0.5	17.9
Stacey Augmon	73	66	28.9	50.1	0.0	73.9	3.9	2.3	1.2	0.2	14.0
Mookie Blaylock	80	78	35.3	42.9	37.5	72.8	3.5	8.4	2.5	0.3	13.4
Duane Ferrell	82	15	21.2	47.0	25.0	77.9	2.3	1.6	0.7	0.2	10.2
Paul Graham	80	11	18.9	45.7	29.8	73.3	2.4	2.1	1.1	0.1	8.1
Travis Mays	49	9	16.1	41.7	34.5	65.9	1.1	1.5	0.4	0.1	7.0
Adam Keefe	82	6	18.9	50.0	0.0	70.0	5.3	1.0	0.7	0.2	6.6
Steve Henson	53	2	13.6	39.0	46.3	85.0	1.0	2.9	0.6	0.0	4.0
Jon Koncak	78	65	25.3	46.4	37.5	48.0	5.5	1.8	1.0	1.3	3.5
Blair Rasmussen	22	6	12.9	37.5	33.3	69.2	2.5	0.2	0.2	0.5	3.2
Greg Foster	33	0	6.2	46.3	0.0	72.2	1.7	0.3	0.1	0.3	3.1
Morlon Wiley	25	2	14.2	32.1	29.4	62.5	1.4	3.2	1.0	0.1	2.9
Jeff Sanders	9	0	13.3	40.0	0.0	50.0	3.2	0.7	0.9	0.1	2.7
Randy Breuer	12	0	8.9	48.4	0.0	40.0	2.3	0.5	0.2	0.3	2.7
Alex Stivrins	5	0	3.0	44.4	0.0	0.0	1.0	0.0	0.0	0.2	1.6
Andre Spencer	3	0	5.0	0.0	0.0	0.0	0.3	0.0	0.7	0.0	0.0

=== Playoffs ===
Player	GP	GS	MPG	FG%	3P%	FT%	RPG	APG	SPG	BPG	PPG
Dominique Wilkins	3	3	37.7	42.7	25.0	76.7	5.3	3.0	1.0	0.3	30.0
Kevin Willis	3	3	34.3	46.7	0.0	57.1	8.7	1.0	0.7	0.0	16.7
Stacey Augmon	3	3	31.0	45.2	0.0	66.7	2.7	1.7	1.3	0.0	12.0
Duane Ferrell	3	0	18.0	60.9	33.3	80.0	1.7	0.3	0.0	0.0	11.0
Mookie Blaylock	3	3	33.0	36.0	33.3	83.3	4.3	4.3	1.0	1.3	9.0
Adam Keefe	3	0	17.7	53.8	0.0	66.7	4.3	2.0	0.3	0.0	6.0
Greg Foster	1	0	5.0	33.3	0.0	75.0	1.0	0.0	0.0	0.0	5.0
Travis Mays	1	0	20.0	50.0	0.0	0.0	1.0	0.0	0.0	0.0	4.0
Steve Henson	3	0	15.7	33.3	40.0	0.0	1.3	1.7	1.3	0.0	2.7
Randy Breuer	1	0	17.0	25.0	0.0	0.0	2.0	1.0	0.0	1.0	2.0
Paul Graham	2	0	13.5	25.0	0.0	0.0	1.5	1.0	2.0	0.0	2.0
Jon Koncak	3	3	29.7	10.0	0.0	50.0	8.0	1.3	1.0	1.7	1.0

Player statistics citation:

== Awards ==
- Dominique Wilkins, All-NBA Second Team

== See also ==
- 1992–93 NBA season
