= 1992–93 Philadelphia 76ers season =

Season of National Basketball Association team the Philadelphia 76ers

- Head coach: Doug Moe; Fred Carter
- Arena: The Spectrum

Results
- Record: 26–56 (.317)
- Place: Division: 6th (Atlantic); Conference: 13th (Eastern)
- Playoff finish: Did not qualify
- Stats at Basketball Reference

Local media
- Television: WPHL-TV; SportsChannel Philadelphia; PRISM
- Radio: WIP

The 1992–93 Philadelphia 76ers season was the 44th season for the Philadelphia 76ers in the National Basketball Association, and their 30th season in Philadelphia, Pennsylvania.

== Season summary ==
=== Off-season ===
The 76ers received the ninth overall pick in the 1992 NBA draft, and selected power forward Clarence Weatherspoon from the University of Southern Mississippi. During the off-season, the team acquired All-Star guard Jeff Hornacek, Andrew Lang and Tim Perry from the Phoenix Suns, and hired Doug Moe as their new head coach.

=== Regular season ===
Under Moe and with the addition of Hornacek, Weatherspoon, Perry and Lang, the 76ers got off to a bad start by losing 11 of their first 14 games of the regular season, after a seven-game losing streak between November and December, and later on held an 18–31 record at the All-Star break. The team also suffered two defeats that were greater than 50 points, a 154–98 road loss to the Sacramento Kings on January 2, 1993, and a 149–93 road loss to the Seattle SuperSonics on March 6. As the NBA in the 1990s emphasized more defensive play, Moe tried to implement an up-tempo attack offense similar to his former Denver Nuggets team of the 1980s, which failed miserably. With the team holding a 19–37 record in early March, he was fired and replaced with assistant coach Fred Carter. Moe would return to coaching with the Denver Nuggets in his second stint under head coach George Karl from 2005 until retirement in 2008.

On March 28, during a nationally televised broadcast game between the Suns and the 76ers, former Sixers forward Charles Barkley received a standing ovation from his former home fans at The Spectrum. When the Sixers team was introduced, the crowd booed loudly at them; the Suns won the game, 110–100. In April, the 76ers signed undrafted free agent Thomas Jordan to a 10-day contract; Jordan previously played overseas in Spain. In the final four games of the regular season, Jordan played a sixth man role off the bench, averaging 11.0 points, 4.8 rebounds and 1.3 blocks per game. The 76ers lost 26 of 30 games between January 30 and April 2, and finished in sixth place in the Atlantic Division with a 26–56 record.

Hersey Hawkins averaged 20.3 points, 3.9 assists and 1.7 steals per game, and led the 76ers with 122 three-point field goals, while Hornacek averaged 19.1 points, 6.9 assists and 1.7 steals per game, and Weatherspoon provided the team with 15.6 points and 7.2 rebounds per game, and was named to the NBA All-Rookie Second Team. In addition, Armen Gilliam contributed 12.4 points and 5.9 rebounds per game, while Perry averaged 9.0 points and 5.0 rebounds per game, Johnny Dawkins provided with 8.9 points and 4.1 assists per game, Ron Anderson contributed 8.1 points per game, Lang averaged 5.3 points, 6.0 rebounds and 1.9 blocks per game, and Manute Bol provided with 2.2 points, 3.3 rebounds and 2.1 blocks per game.

During the NBA All-Star weekend at the Delta Center in Salt Lake City, Utah, Weatherspoon and Perry both participated in the NBA Slam Dunk Contest; it was Perry's second appearance in the Slam Dunk Contest. The 76ers finished 26th in the NBA in home-game attendance, with an attendance of 515,284 at The Spectrum during the regular season, which was the second-lowest in the league.

=== Aftermath ===
Following the season, Hawkins was traded to the Charlotte Hornets after five seasons with the 76ers, while Gilliam and Anderson both left for free agency and signed with the New Jersey Nets, Lang signed with the Atlanta Hawks, Bol signed with the Miami Heat, and Jordan, Charles Shackleford and Greg Grant were all released; Jordan would return to playing basketball overseas, ending his short lived stint in the NBA.

== NBA draft ==
Round	Pick	Player	Position	Nationality	School/Club team
1	9	Clarence Weatherspoon	PF	United States	Southern Miss

== Roster ==
1992–93 Philadelphia 76ers roster
Players

Pos.	No.	Player	Height	Weight	DOB	From
SF	20	Ron Anderson	6 ft 7 in (2.01 m)	215 lb (98 kg)	––	Fresno State
C	11	Manute Bol	7 ft 7 in (2.31 m)	200 lb (91 kg)	––	Bridgeport
PG	12	Johnny Dawkins	6 ft 2 in (1.88 m)	165 lb (75 kg)	––	Duke
SF	35	Armen Gilliam	6 ft 9 in (2.06 m)	230 lb (104 kg)	––	UNLV
PG	3	Greg Grant	5 ft 7 in (1.70 m)	140 lb (64 kg)	––	TCNJ
SG	33	Hersey Hawkins	6 ft 3 in (1.91 m)	190 lb (86 kg)	––	Bradley
PG	14	Jeff Hornacek	6 ft 3 in (1.91 m)	190 lb (86 kg)	––	Iowa State
PF	55	Thomas Jordan	6 ft 10 in (2.08 m)	220 lb (100 kg)	––	Oklahoma State
C	28	Andrew Lang	6 ft 11 in (2.11 m)	245 lb (111 kg)	––	Arkansas
SF	21	Kenny Payne	6 ft 8 in (2.03 m)	195 lb (88 kg)	––	Louisville
PF	23	Tim Perry	6 ft 9 in (2.06 m)	200 lb (91 kg)	––	Temple
C	17	Charles Shackleford	6 ft 10 in (2.08 m)	225 lb (102 kg)	––	NC State
PF	30	Clarence Weatherspoon	6 ft 6 in (1.98 m)	240 lb (109 kg)	––	Southern Miss
PF	45	Eddie Lee Wilkins	6 ft 10 in (2.08 m)	220 lb (100 kg)	––	Gardner–Webb

Coaches
Head coach
- Fred Carter
Assistant(s)
- Tony DiLeo
- David Moe

Legend
- (DP) Unsigned draft pick
- (FA) Free agent
- (S) Suspended
- Injured

== Regular season ==
=== Season standings ===
Atlantic Division	W	L	PCT	GB	Home	Road	Div
y-New York Knicks	60	22	.732	—	37–4	23–18	23–5
x-Boston Celtics	48	34	.585	12	28–13	20–21	19–9
x-New Jersey Nets	43	39	.524	17	26–15	17–24	14–14
Orlando Magic	41	41	.500	19	27–14	14–27	15–13
Miami Heat	36	46	.439	24	26–15	10–31	9–19
Philadelphia 76ers	26	56	.317	34	15–26	11–30	11–17
Washington Bullets	22	60	.268	38	15–26	7–34	7–21

y - clinched division title
x - clinched playoff spot

#	Eastern Conference				
#	Team	W	L	PCT	GB
1	c-New York Knicks	60	22	.732	–
2	y-Chicago Bulls	57	25	.695	3
3	x-Cleveland Cavaliers	54	28	.659	6
4	x-Boston Celtics	48	34	.585	12
5	x-Charlotte Hornets	44	38	.537	16
6	x-New Jersey Nets	43	39	.524	17
7	x-Atlanta Hawks	43	39	.524	17
8	x-Indiana Pacers	41	41	.500	19
9	Orlando Magic	41	41	.500	19
10	Detroit Pistons	40	42	.488	20
11	Miami Heat	36	46	.439	24
12	Milwaukee Bucks	28	54	.341	32
13	Philadelphia 76ers	26	56	.317	36
14	Washington Bullets	22	60	.268	38

z - clinched division title
y - clinched division title
x - clinched playoff spot

== Player statistics ==
Legend
GP	Games played	GS	Games started	MPG	Minutes per game
FG%	Field-goal percentage	3P%	3-point field-goal percentage	FT%	Free-throw percentage
RPG	Rebounds per game	APG	Assists per game	SPG	Steals per game
BPG	Blocks per game	PPG	Points per game

=== Regular season ===
Player	GP	GS	MPG	FG%	3P%	FT%	RPG	APG	SPG	BPG	PPG
Ron Anderson	69	0	18.3	.414	.325	.809	2.7	1.3	.4	.1	8.1
Manute Bol	58	23	14.7	.409	.313	.632	3.3	.3	.2	2.1	2.2
Johnny Dawkins	74	10	21.6	.437	.310	.796	1.8	4.6	1.1	.1	8.9
Armen Gilliam	80	26	21.8	.464	.000	.843	5.9	1.5	.5	.7	12.4
Greg Grant	72	0	13.8	.350	.294	.645	.9	2.9	.6	.0	2.7
Hersey Hawkins	81	81	36.8	.470	.397	.860	4.3	3.9	1.7	.4	20.3
Jeff Hornacek	79	78	36.2	.470	.390	.865	4.3	6.9	1.7	.3	19.1
Thomas Jordan	4	0	26.5	.439		.471	4.8	.8	.8	1.3	11.0
Andrew Lang	73	59	25.5	.425	.200	.763	6.0	1.1	.6	1.9	5.3
Kenny Payne	13	0	11.8	.422	.222	1.000	1.8	1.4	.4	.2	6.5
Tim Perry	81	51	26.0	.468	.204	.710	5.0	1.6	.5	1.1	9.0
Charles Shackleford	48	0	11.8	.488	.000	.633	4.3	.5	.3	.5	4.0
Clarence Weatherspoon	82	82	32.4	.469	.250	.713	7.2	1.8	1.0	.8	15.6
Eddie Lee Wilkins	26	0	7.4	.567	.000	.615	1.5	.1	.3	.0	6.1

Player statistics citation:

== Awards and records ==
- Clarence Weatherspoon, NBA All-Rookie Team 2nd Team

== See also ==
- 1992–93 NBA season
