= 1992–93 Indiana Pacers season =

NBA professional basketball team season

- Head coach: Bob Hill
- General manager: Donnie Walsh
- Owner: Herbert Simon
- Arena: Market Square Arena

Results
- Record: 41–41 (.500)
- Place: Division: 5th (Central); Conference: 8th (Eastern)
- Playoff finish: First round (lost to Knicks 1–3)
- Stats at Basketball Reference

Local media
- Television: WTTV; Prime Sports Midwest
- Radio: WNDE

The 1992–93 Indiana Pacers season was the 17th season for the Indiana Pacers in the National Basketball Association, and their 26th season as a franchise.

== Season summary ==
=== Off-season ===
The Pacers had the 14th overall pick in the 1992 NBA draft, and selected shooting guard Malik Sealy out of St. John's University. During the off-season, the team acquired Pooh Richardson and Sam Mitchell from the Minnesota Timberwolves.

=== Regular season ===
With the addition of Richardson and Mitchell, the Pacers got off to a 13–10 start to the regular season, but then posted a six-game losing streak between December and January afterwards, falling below .500 in winning percentage. The team posted a seven-game losing streak in February, and held a 23–28 record at the All-Star break. However, the team soon recovered and played above .500 for the remainder of the season. On the final day of the regular season on April 24, 1993, the Pacers defeated the Miami Heat at home, 94–88 at the Market Square Arena, finishing in fifth place in the Central Division with a 41–41 record, and winning a tie-breaker over the Orlando Magic for the eighth seed in the Eastern Conference.

Reggie Miller led the Pacers with 21.2 points and 1.5 steals per game, and finished tied in first place in the league with 167 three-point field goals, while 2-time Sixth Man of the Year Detlef Schrempf became the team's starting small forward, averaging 19.1 points, 9.5 rebounds and 6.0 assists per game. In addition, Rik Smits provided the team with 14.3 points and 5.3 rebounds per game, while Richardson contributed 10.4 points, 7.7 assists and 1.3 steals per game, and second-year forward Dale Davis averaged 8.9 points, 8.8 rebounds and 1.8 blocks per game. Off the bench, Vern Fleming provided with 9.5 points and 3.0 assists per game, while Mitchell contributed 7.2 points and 3.1 rebounds per game, George McCloud contributed 7.2 points and 2.5 assists per game, and Kenny Williams averaged 6.1 points and 4.0 rebounds per game.

During the NBA All-Star weekend at the Delta Center in Salt Lake City, Utah, Schrempf was selected for the 1993 NBA All-Star Game, as a member of the Eastern Conference All-Star team; it was his first ever All-Star appearance. Meanwhile, Miller participated in the NBA Three-Point Shootout for the third time. Despite a stellar season, Miller was not selected for the NBA All-Star Game. The Pacers finished 24th in the NBA in home-game attendance, with an attendance of 530,891 at the Market Square Arena during the regular season, which was the fourth-lowest in the league.

=== NBA playoffs ===
In the Eastern Conference First Round of the 1993 NBA playoffs, the Pacers faced off against the top–seeded, and Atlantic Division champion New York Knicks, who were led by the trio of All-Star center Patrick Ewing, John Starks and Charles Oakley. The Pacers lost the first two games to the Knicks on the road at Madison Square Garden, but managed to win Game 3 at home, 116–93 at the Market Square Arena, in which Miller scored 36 points. However, the Pacers lost Game 4 to the Knicks at home in overtime, 109–100, thus losing the series in four games; it was the fourth consecutive year that the Pacers lost in the opening round of the NBA playoffs.

=== Aftermath ===
Following the season, Schrempf was traded to the Seattle SuperSonics after four in a half seasons with the Pacers, while head coach Bob Hill was fired, and McCloud was released to free agency, and left to play overseas in Italy.

== Draft picks ==
Round	Pick	Player	Position	Nationality	College
1	14	Malik Sealy	SG/SF	United States	St. John's

== Roster ==
1992–93 Indiana Pacers roster
Players

Pos.	No.	Player	Height	Weight	DOB	From
F/C	32	Dale Davis	6 ft 11 in (2.11 m)	230 lb (104 kg)	1969–03–25	Clemson
C	54	Greg Dreiling	7 ft 1 in (2.16 m)	250 lb (113 kg)	1962–11–07	Kansas
G	10	Vern Fleming	6 ft 5 in (1.96 m)	185 lb (84 kg)	1962–02–04	Georgia
G	23	Sean Green	6 ft 5 in (1.96 m)	210 lb (95 kg)	1970–02–01	Iona
G/F	20	George McCloud	6 ft 6 in (1.98 m)	205 lb (93 kg)	1967–05–27	Florida State
G	31	Reggie Miller	6 ft 7 in (2.01 m)	185 lb (84 kg)	1965–08–24	UCLA
F	5	Sam Mitchell	6 ft 6 in (1.98 m)	210 lb (95 kg)	1963–09–02	Mercer
G	24	Pooh Richardson	6 ft 1 in (1.85 m)	180 lb (82 kg)	1966–05–14	UCLA
F	11	Detlef Schrempf	6 ft 9 in (2.06 m)	214 lb (97 kg)	1963–01–21	Washington
F	21	Malik Sealy	6 ft 8 in (2.03 m)	190 lb (86 kg)	1970–02–01	St. John's
C	45	Rik Smits	7 ft 4 in (2.24 m)	250 lb (113 kg)	1966–08–23	Marist
F/C	41	LaSalle Thompson	6 ft 10 in (2.08 m)	245 lb (111 kg)	1961–06–23	Texas
F	44	Kenny Williams	6 ft 9 in (2.06 m)	205 lb (93 kg)	1969–06–09	Elizabeth City State

Coaches
Head coach
- Bob Hill
Assistant(s)
- Ed Badger
- Mel Daniels
- Bob Ociepka
- Randy Wittman

Legend
- (DP) Unsigned draft pick
- (FA) Free agent
- (S) Suspended
- Injured

== Regular season ==
=== Season standings ===
Central Division	W	L	PCT	GB	Home	Road	Div
y-Chicago Bulls	57	25	.695	—	31–10	26–15	19–9
x-Cleveland Cavaliers	54	28	.659	3	35–6	19–22	22–6
x-Charlotte Hornets	44	38	.537	13	22–19	22–19	12–16
x-Atlanta Hawks	43	39	.524	14	25–16	18–23	12–16
x-Indiana Pacers	41	41	.500	16	27–14	14–27	11–17
Detroit Pistons	40	42	.488	17	28–13	12–29	12–16
Milwaukee Bucks	28	54	.341	29	18–23	10–31	10–18

y - clinched division title
x - clinched playoff spot

#	Eastern Conference				
#	Team	W	L	PCT	GB
1	c-New York Knicks	60	22	.732	–
2	y-Chicago Bulls	57	25	.695	3
3	x-Cleveland Cavaliers	54	28	.659	6
4	x-Boston Celtics	48	34	.585	12
5	x-Charlotte Hornets	44	38	.537	16
6	x-New Jersey Nets	43	39	.524	17
7	x-Atlanta Hawks	43	39	.524	17
8	x-Indiana Pacers	41	41	.500	19
9	Orlando Magic	41	41	.500	19
10	Detroit Pistons	40	42	.488	20
11	Miami Heat	36	46	.439	24
12	Milwaukee Bucks	28	54	.341	32
13	Philadelphia 76ers	26	56	.317	36
14	Washington Bullets	22	60	.268	38

z - clinched division title
y - clinched division title
x - clinched playoff spot

== Game log ==
=== Regular season ===
1992–93 game log
Total: 41–41 (home: 27–14; road: 14–27)
November: 6–6 (home: 4–3; road: 2–3)

Game	Date	Team	Score	High points	High rebounds	High assists	Location Attendance	Record
1	November 7, 1992	Detroit	L 87–89				Market Square Arena	0–1
2	November 9, 1992	@ Chicago	L 97–102				Chicago Stadium	0–2
3	November 11, 1992	Philadelphia	W 120–114				Market Square Arena	1–2
4	November 13, 1992	Charlotte	W 110–109				Market Square Arena	2–2
5	November 14, 1992	@ Detroit	W 104–100				The Palace of Auburn Hills	3–2
6	November 17, 1992	Denver	W 128–98				Market Square Arena	4–2
7	November 20, 1992	Utah	L 95–97				Market Square Arena	4–3
8	November 21, 1992	@ Milwaukee	L 95–105				Bradley Center	4–4
9	November 24, 1992	Miami	W 114–82				Market Square Arena	5–4
10	November 25, 1992	@ Miami	L 93–110				Miami Arena	5–5
11	November 27, 1992	Orlando	L 116–130				Market Square Arena	5–6
12	November 28, 1992	@ Charlotte	W 134–122				Charlotte Coliseum	6–6

December: 7–9 (home: 3–3; road: 4–6)

Game	Date	Team	Score	High points	High rebounds	High assists	Location Attendance	Record
13	December 1, 1992	@ Atlanta	L 107–119				The Omni	6–7
14	December 2, 1992	Portland	L 103–112				Market Square Arena	6–8
15	December 4, 1992	Atlanta	W 122–106				Market Square Arena	7–8
16	December 5, 1992	@ Washington	W 111–109				Capital Centre	8–8
17	December 8, 1992	@ Golden State	W 125–115				Oakland-Alameda County Coliseum Arena	9–8
18	December 10, 1992	@ Sacramento	W 106–99				ARCO Arena	10–8
19	December 11, 1992	@ Portland	W 134–124 (2OT)				Memorial Coliesum	11–8
20	December 13, 1992	@ L.A. Clippers	L 101–112				Los Angeles Memorial Sports Arena	11–9
21	December 16, 1992	Boston	W 114–91				Market Square Arena	12–9
22	December 18, 1992	@ Detroit	L 106–122				The Palace of Auburn Hills	12–10
23	December 19, 1992	New Jersey	W 124–110				Market Square Arena	13–10
24	December 21, 1992	@ Philadelphia	L 101–113				The Spectrum	13–11
25	December 23, 1992	@ Cleveland	L 104–118				Richfield Coliseum	13–12
26	December 26, 1992	Chicago	L 84–95				Market Square Arena	13–13
27	December 29, 1992	@ New York	L 91–97				Madison Square Garden	13–14
28	December 30, 1992	New York	L 90–94				Market Square Arena	13–15

January: 9–6 (home: 6–3; road: 3–3)

Game	Date	Team	Score	High points	High rebounds	High assists	Location Attendance	Record
29	January 2, 1993	@ Chicago	L 100–109				Chicago Stadium	13–16
30	January 5, 1993	L.A. Clippers	W 114–106				Market Square Arena	14–16
31	January 6, 1993	@ Boston	L 94–103				Boston Garden	14–17
32	January 9, 1993	@ Orlando	W 104–88				Orlando Arena	15–17
33	January 12, 1993	Philadelphia	W 112–93				Market Square Arena	16–17
34	January 15, 1993	Cleveland	L 120–132				Market Square Arena	16–18
35	January 16, 1993	Golden State	W 117–116				Market Square Arena	17–18
36	January 18, 1993	@ New Jersey	L 97–100				Brendan Byrne Arena	17–19
37	January 19, 1993	Washington	W 116–96				Market Square Arena	18–19
38	January 21, 1993	Milwaukee	L 108–110				Market Square Arena	18–20
39	January 23, 1993	Houston	L 100–113				Market Square Arena	18–21
40	January 24, 1993	@ Charlotte	W 112–105				Charlotte Coliseum	19–21
41	January 27, 1993	@ Philadelphia	W 127–125 (OT)				The Spectrum	20–21
42	January 28, 1993	L.A. Lakers	W 127–110				Market Square Arena	21–21
43	January 30, 1993	Detroit	W 110–106				Market Square Arena	22–21

February: 4–8 (home: 4–2; road: 0–6)

Game	Date	Team	Score	High points	High rebounds	High assists	Location Attendance	Record
44	February 2, 1993	@ Houston	L 104–115				The Summit	22–22
45	February 4, 1993	@ San Antonio	L 115–133				HemisFair Arena	22–23
46	February 5, 1993	@ Dallas	L 104–105				Reunion Arena	22–24
47	February 10, 1993	Chicago	L 104–115				Market Square Arena	22–25
48	February 12, 1993	Minnesota	L 100–102				Market Square Arena	22–26
49	February 13, 1993	@ Milwaukee	L 115–117				Bradley Center	22–27
50	February 15, 1993	@ Cleveland	L 105–110				Richfield Coliseum	22–28
51	February 17, 1993	Sacramento	W 125–99				Market Square Arena	23–28
All-Star Break
52	February 23, 1993	Boston	W 113–86				Market Square Arena	24–28
53	February 24, 1993	@ Washington	L 101–105				Capital Centre	24–29
54	February 26, 1993	Charlotte	W 137–105				Market Square Arena	25–29
55	February 28, 1993	Dallas	W 110–96				Market Square Arena	26–29

March: 8–6 (home: 6–0; road: 2–6)

Game	Date	Team	Score	High points	High rebounds	High assists	Location Attendance	Record
56	March 2, 1993	San Antonio	W 109–95				Market Square Arena	27–29
57	March 4, 1993	Atlanta	W 136–111				Market Square Arena	28–29
58	March 7, 1993	@ Miami	L 99–114				Miami Arena	28–30
59	March 8, 1993	Seattle	W 105–99				Market Square Arena	29–30
60	March 10, 1993	@ Orlando	L 106–119				Orlando Arena	29–31
61	March 14, 1993	@ New York	L 90–121				Madison Square Garden	29–32
62	March 17, 1993	Milwaukee	W 114–91				Market Square Arena	30–32
63	March 19, 1993	Charlotte	W 112–108				Market Square Arena	31–32
64	March 21, 1993	@ Phoenix	W 109–108				America West Arena	32–32
65	March 23, 1993	@ Utah	L 101–119				Delta Center	32–33
66	March 25, 1993	@ Seattle	W 120–117				Seattle Center Coliseum	33–33
67	March 27, 1993	@ Denver	L 106–123				McNichols Sports Arena	33–34
68	March 28, 1993	@ L.A. Lakers	L 90–92				Great Western Forum	33–35
69	March 31, 1993	Washington	W 114–95				Market Square Arena	34–35

April: 7–6 (home: 4–3; road: 3–3)

Game	Date	Team	Score	High points	High rebounds	High assists	Location Attendance	Record
70	April 2, 1993	Orlando	W 118–102				Market Square Arena	35–35
71	April 4, 1993	Phoenix	L 100–110				Market Square Arena	35–36
72	April 6, 1993	@ New Jersey	W 98–85				Brendan Byrne Arena	36–36
73	April 7, 1993	@ Minnesota	W 113–105				Target Center	37–36
74	April 10, 1993	Chicago	L 87–92				Market Square Arena	37–37
75	April 13, 1993	@ Boston	L 90–96				Boston Garden	37–38
76	April 14, 1993	New Jersey	W 109–90				Market Square Arena	38–38
77	April 16, 1993	New York	W 100–94				Market Square Arena	39–38
78	April 18, 1993	@ Milwaukee	W 108–98				Bradley Center	40–38
79	April 20, 1993	@ Atlanta	L 102–111				The Omni	40–39
80	April 21, 1993	Cleveland	L 95–111				Market Square Arena	40–40
81	April 23, 1993	@ Detroit	L 104–109				The Palace of Auburn Hills	40–41
82	April 24, 1993	Miami	W 94–88				Market Square Arena	41–41

1992–93 schedule

== Playoffs ==
1993 playoff game log
Eastern Conference First Round: 1–3 (home: 1–1; road: 0–2)

Game	Date	Team	Score	High points	High rebounds	High assists	Location Attendance	Series
1	April 30, 1993	@ New York	L 104–107	Reggie Miller (32)	LaSalle Thompson (7)	George McCloud (6)	Madison Square Garden; 19,763	0–1
2	May 2, 1993	@ New York	L 91–101	Rik Smits (29)	Dale Davis (9)	Detlef Schrempf (7)	Madison Square Garden; 19,763	0–2
3	May 4, 1993	New York	W 116–93	Reggie Miller (36)	Rik Smits (8)	Pooh Richardson (9)	Market Square Arena; 11,380	1–2
4	May 6, 1993	New York	L 100–109 (OT)	Reggie Miller (33)	Smits, Davis (12)	Pooh Richardson (8)	Market Square Arena; 13,059	1–3

1993 schedule

== Player statistics ==
=== Ragular season ===
Player	POS	GP	GS	MP	REB	AST	STL	BLK	PTS	MPG	RPG	APG	SPG	BPG	PPG
Reggie Miller	SG	82	82	2,954	258	262	120	26	1,736	36.0	3.1	3.2	1.5	.3	21.2
Dale Davis	PF	82	82	2,264	723	69	63	148	727	27.6	8.8	.8	.8	1.8	8.9
Detlef Schrempf	PF	82	60	3,098	780	493	79	27	1,567	37.8	9.5	6.0	1.0	.3	19.1
Rik Smits	C	81	81	2,072	432	121	27	75	1,155	25.6	5.3	1.5	.3	.9	14.3
Sam Mitchell	SF	81	1	1,402	248	76	23	10	584	17.3	3.1	.9	.3	.1	7.2
George McCloud	SF	78	21	1,500	205	192	53	11	565	19.2	2.6	2.5	.7	.1	7.2
Vern Fleming	PG	75	8	1,503	169	224	63	9	710	20.0	2.3	3.0	.8	.1	9.5
Pooh Richardson	PG	74	73	2,396	267	573	94	12	769	32.4	3.6	7.7	1.3	.2	10.4
LaSalle Thompson	C	63	0	730	178	34	29	24	237	11.6	2.8	.5	.5	.4	3.8
Malik Sealy	SF	58	2	672	112	47	36	7	330	11.6	1.9	.8	.6	.1	5.7
Kenny Williams	SF	57	0	844	228	38	21	45	348	14.8	4.0	.7	.4	.8	6.1
Greg Dreiling	C	43	0	239	66	8	5	8	46	5.6	1.5	.2	.1	.2	1.1
Sean Green	SG	13	0	81	9	7	2	1	62	6.2	.7	.5	.2	.1	4.8

=== Playoffs ===
Player	POS	GP	GS	MP	REB	AST	STL	BLK	PTS	MPG	RPG	APG	SPG	BPG	PPG
Reggie Miller	SG	4	4	175	12	11	3	0	126	43.8	3.0	2.8	.8	.0	31.5
Detlef Schrempf	PF	4	4	165	23	29	1	2	78	41.3	5.8	7.3	.3	.5	19.5
Rik Smits	C	4	4	143	32	7	5	4	90	35.8	8.0	1.8	1.3	1.0	22.5
Dale Davis	PF	4	4	117	32	4	4	4	17	29.3	8.0	1.0	1.0	1.0	4.3
Pooh Richardson	PG	4	1	95	11	23	2	0	17	23.8	2.8	5.8	.5	.0	4.3
George McCloud	SF	4	0	79	11	14	4	1	19	19.8	2.8	3.5	1.0	.3	4.8
LaSalle Thompson	C	4	0	73	14	3	3	2	15	18.3	3.5	.8	.8	.5	3.8
Sam Mitchell	SF	4	0	25	1	0	0	0	12	6.3	.3	.0	.0	.0	3.0
Vern Fleming	PG	3	3	80	5	3	2	1	30	26.7	1.7	1.0	.7	.3	10.0
Malik Sealy	SF	3	0	18	2	0	0	0	2	6.0	.7	.0	.0	.0	.7
Kenny Williams	SF	2	0	11	0	2	0	2	2	5.5	.0	1.0	.0	1.0	1.0
Greg Dreiling	C	2	0	4	1	0	0	0	3	2.0	.5	.0	.0	.0	1.5

== Awards and records ==
- Detlef Schrempf, NBA All-Star Game

== See also ==
- 1992-93 NBA season
