= 1992–93 Detroit Pistons season =

- Head coach: Ron Rothstein
- General manager: Billy McKinney
- Owner: William Davidson
- Arena: The Palace of Auburn Hills

Results
- Record: 40–42 (.488)
- Place: Division: 6th (Central); Conference: 10th (Eastern)
- Playoff finish: Did not qualify
- Stats at Basketball Reference

Local media
- Television: WKBD-TV; PASS Sports
- Radio: WWJ

The 1992–93 Detroit Pistons season was the 45th season for the Detroit Pistons in the National Basketball Association, and their 36th season in Detroit, Michigan.

== Season summary ==
=== Off-season ===
During the off-season, the Pistons signed free agent Terry Mills, acquired Olden Polynice from the Los Angeles Clippers, and hired Ron Rothstein as their new head coach.

=== Regular season ===
Under Rothstein, and with the addition of Mills and Polynice, the Pistons struggled losing nine of their first eleven games of the regular season, which included a seven-game losing streak. However, the team won ten of their next eleven games, but then fell below .500 in winning percentage posting a six-game losing streak in January, and later on holding a 21–29 record at the All-Star break. At mid-season, the Pistons traded Orlando Woolridge to the Milwaukee Bucks in exchange for All-Star guard Alvin Robertson. With the addition of Robertson, the Pistons posted a six-game winning streak between March and April, but then lost five of their final eight games of the season, finishing in sixth place in the Central Division with a 40–42 record, and missing the NBA playoffs for the first time since the 1982–83 season.

Joe Dumars averaged 23.5 points and 4.0 assists per game, led the Pistons with 112 three-point field goals, and was named to the All-NBA Second Team, while Isiah Thomas averaged 17.6 points, 8.5 assists and 1.6 steals per game, and Mills provided the team with 14.8 points and 5.8 rebounds per game. In addition, Mark Aguirre contributed 9.9 points per game off the bench, but only played 51 games due to injuries and weight problems, while Robertson provided with 9.3 points, 3.6 assists and 2.2 steals per game in 30 games after the trade, Bill Laimbeer averaged 8.7 points and 5.3 rebounds per game, Polynice provided with 7.3 points and 6.2 rebounds per game, and Dennis Rodman contributed 7.5 points, and led the league with 18.3 rebounds per game.

During the NBA All-Star weekend at the Delta Center in Salt Lake City, Utah, Dumars and Thomas were both selected for the 1993 NBA All-Star Game, as members of the Eastern Conference All-Star team; it was Thomas's eleventh and final All-Star appearance, and his twelfth All-Star selection. Dumars and Rodman were both named to the NBA All-Defensive First Team; Dumars also finished tied in tenth place in Most Valuable Player voting, while Mills finished tied in eleventh place in Most Improved Player voting, and Rodman finished in fourth place in Defensive Player of the Year voting.

The Pistons finished second in the NBA in home-game attendance behind the Charlotte Hornets, with an attendance of 889,614 at The Palace of Auburn Hills during the regular season.

=== Aftermath ===
Rodman's bizarre behavior off the court was a great concern, as he was involved in several off-the-court incidents, including a suicide attempt. Following the season, he was traded to the San Antonio Spurs after seven seasons with the Pistons, while Aguirre signed as a free agent with the Los Angeles Clippers, and Rothstein was fired as head coach after just one season with the Pistons.

== Draft picks ==
Round	Pick	Player	Position	Nationality	College
1	19	Don MacLean	PF	United States	UCLA

== Roster ==
1992–93 Detroit Pistons roster
Players

Pos.	No.	Player	Height	Weight	DOB	From
G/F	24	Mark Aguirre	6 ft 6 in (1.98 m)	232 lb (105 kg)	1959–12–10	DePaul
G	4	Joe Dumars	6 ft 3 in (1.91 m)	190 lb (86 kg)	1963–05–24	McNeese State
G	25	Gerald Glass	6 ft 5 in (1.96 m)	221 lb (100 kg)	1967–11–12	Mississippi
C	40	Bill Laimbeer	6 ft 11 in (2.11 m)	245 lb (111 kg)	1957–05–19	Notre Dame
F	6	Terry Mills	6 ft 10 in (2.08 m)	230 lb (104 kg)	1967–12–21	Michigan
F	35	Isaiah Morris	6 ft 8 in (2.03 m)	219 lb (99 kg)	1969–04–02	Arkansas
G	23	Melvin Newbern	6 ft 4 in (1.93 m)	200 lb (91 kg)	1967–06–11	Minnesota
C	34	Olden Polynice	6 ft 11 in (2.11 m)	220 lb (100 kg)	1964–11–21	Virginia
F	42	Mark Randall	6 ft 8 in (2.03 m)	235 lb (107 kg)	1967–09–30	Kansas
G/F	3	Alvin Robertson	6 ft 3 in (1.91 m)	185 lb (84 kg)	1962–07–22	Arkansas
F	10	Dennis Rodman	6 ft 7 in (2.01 m)	210 lb (95 kg)	1961–05–13	SE Oklahoma State
G	11	Isiah Thomas	6 ft 1 in (1.85 m)	180 lb (82 kg)	1961–04–30	Indiana
G	20	Danny Young	6 ft 3 in (1.91 m)	175 lb (79 kg)	1962–07–26	Wake Forest

Coaches
Head coach
- Ron Rothstein
Assistant(s)
- Don Chaney
- Brendan Malone
- Alan Srebnick

Legend
- (DP) Unsigned draft pick
- (FA) Free agent
- (S) Suspended
- Injured

== Regular season ==
=== Season standings ===
Central Division	W	L	PCT	GB	Home	Road	Div
y-Chicago Bulls	57	25	.695	—	31–10	26–15	19–9
x-Cleveland Cavaliers	54	28	.659	3	35–6	19–22	22–6
x-Charlotte Hornets	44	38	.537	13	22–19	22–19	12–16
x-Atlanta Hawks	43	39	.524	14	25–16	18–23	12–16
x-Indiana Pacers	41	41	.500	16	27–14	14–27	11–17
Detroit Pistons	40	42	.488	17	28–13	12–29	12–16
Milwaukee Bucks	28	54	.341	29	18–23	10–31	10–18

#	Eastern Conference				
#	Team	W	L	PCT	GB
1	c-New York Knicks	60	22	.732	–
2	y-Chicago Bulls	57	25	.695	3
3	x-Cleveland Cavaliers	54	28	.659	6
4	x-Boston Celtics	48	34	.585	12
5	x-Charlotte Hornets	44	38	.537	16
6	x-New Jersey Nets	43	39	.524	17
7	x-Atlanta Hawks	43	39	.524	17
8	x-Indiana Pacers	41	41	.500	19
9	Orlando Magic	41	41	.500	19
10	Detroit Pistons	40	42	.488	20
11	Miami Heat	36	46	.439	24
12	Milwaukee Bucks	28	54	.341	32
13	Philadelphia 76ers	26	56	.317	36
14	Washington Bullets	22	60	.268	38

z - clinched division title
y - clinched division title
x - clinched playoff spot

=== Game log ===
1992–93 game log
Total: 40-42 (Home: 28–13; Road: 12–29)
November: 3–9 (home: 2–3; road: 1–6)

Game	Date	Team	Score	High points	High rebounds	High assists	Location Attendance	Record
1	November 6	Milwaukee	L 81–86	Joe Dumars (21)	Dennis Rodman (14)	Isiah Thomas (7)	The Palace of Auburn Hills; 21,454	0–1
2	November 7	@ Indiana	W 89–87	Mark Aguirre (24)	Olden Polynice (12)	Orlando Woolridge, Mark Aguirre, Isiah Thomas (5)	Market Square Arena; 16,183	1–1
3	November 11	@ Chicago	L 96–98 (OT)	Isiah Thomas (32)	Dennis Rodman (10)	Isiah Thomas (8)	Chicago Stadium; 18,676	1–2
4	November 12	Miami	W 95–88	Joe Dumars (29)	Olden Polynice (11)	Isiah Thomas (10)	The Palace of Auburn Hills; 21,454	2–2
5	November 14	Indiana	L 100–104	Joe Dumars (23)	Terry Mills (10)	Isiah Thomas (9)	The Palace of Auburn Hills; 21,454	2–3
6	November 17	@ L.A. Clippers	L 106–115 (OT)	Joe Dumars (28)	Olden Polynice (19)	Joe Dumars (7)	Los Angeles Memorial Sports Arena; 10,096	2–4
7	November 19	@ Denver	L 87–99	Joe Dumars (25)	Olden Polynice (7)	Joe Dumars (8)	McNichols Sports Arena; 12,506	2–5
8	November 21	@ Seattle	L 101–138	Mark Aguirre (18)	Olden Polynice (11)	Joe Dumars (5)	Seattle Center Coliseum; 14,252	2–6
9	November 22	@ Portland	L 90–115	Joe Dumars (19)	Olden Polynice (12)	Isiah Thomas (6)	Memorial Coliseum; 12,888	2–7
10	November 25	Charlotte	L 97–101	Gerald Glass (20)	Dennis Rodman (20)	Isiah Thomas (12)	The Palace of Auburn Hills; 21,454	2–8
11	November 28	@ Minnesota	L 80–82	Joe Dumars (25)	Dennis Rodman (24)	Isiah Thomas (7)	Target Center; 19,006	2–9
12	November 29	New York	W 82–76	Joe Dumars (23)	Dennis Rodman (20)	Isiah Thomas (7)	The Palace of Auburn Hills; 21,454	3–9

December: 11–3 (home: 7–0; road: 4–3)

Game	Date	Team	Score	High points	High rebounds	High assists	Location Attendance	Record
13	December 4	@ Philadelphia	W 101–99	Joe Dumars (25)	Dennis Rodman (23)	Isiah Thomas (9)	The Spectrum; 11,180	4–9
14	December 5	Philadelphia	W 112–88	Isiah Thomas (25)	Dennis Rodman (20)	Isiah Thomas (12)	The Palace of Auburn Hills; 21,454	5–9
15	December 9	Orlando	W 108–103	Joe Dumars (39)	Dennis Rodman (22)	Isiah Thomas (12)	The Palace of Auburn Hills; 21,454	6–9
16	December 11	Cleveland	W 107–103	Joe Dumars (28)	Dennis Rodman (21)	Isiah Thomas (6)	The Palace of Auburn Hills; 21,454	7–9
17	December 12	@ New York	L 88–95	Joe Dumars (19)	Dennis Rodman (16)	Isiah Thomas (12)	Madison Square Garden; 19,763	7–10
18	December 15	@ Atlanta	W 107–94	Joe Dumars (32)	Dennis Rodman (21)	Isiah Thomas (16)	The Omni; 8,503	8–10
19	December 16	Atlanta	W 89–88	Joe Dumars (25)	Dennis Rodman (21)	Isiah Thomas (13)	The Palace of Auburn Hills; 21,454	9–10
20	December 18	Indiana	W 122–106	Terry Mills (20)	Dennis Rodman (16)	Isiah Thomas (10)	The Palace of Auburn Hills; 21,454	10–10
21	December 19	@ Milwaukee	W 103–90	Isiah Thomas (26)	Dennis Rodman (22)	Isiah Thomas (6)	Bradley Center; 17,264	11–10
22	December 22	Houston	W 98–84	Joe Dumars (23)	Dennis Rodman (18)	Isiah Thomas, Bill Laimbeer, Joe Dumars (6)	The Palace of Auburn Hills; 21,454	12–10
23	December 23	@ Charlotte	L 95–107	Isiah Thomas (25)	Dennis Rodman (18)	Isiah Thomas (8)	Charlotte Coliseum; 23,698	12–11
24	December 26	@ Washington	W 99–97	Joe Dumars (23)	Dennis Rodman (22)	Isiah Thomas (11)	Baltimore Arena; 12,346	13–11
25	December 28	@ Cleveland	L 89–98	Joe Dumars, Terry Mills (23)	Dennis Rodman (18)	Joe Dumars (7)	Richfield Coliseum; 20,273	13–12
26	December 30	Washington	W 118–110	Joe Dumars (36)	Dennis Rodman (23)	Isiah Thomas (11)	The Palace of Auburn Hills; 21,454	14–12

January: 5–11 (home: 4–4; road: 1–7)

Game	Date	Team	Score	High points	High rebounds	High assists	Location Attendance	Record
27	January 2	@ Orlando	W 98–97	Joe Dumars (32)	Dennis Rodman (16)	Isiah Thomas (10)	Orlando Arena; 15,151	15–12
28	January 5	@ Miami	L 83–89	Isiah Thomas (25)	Dennis Rodman (24)	Isiah Thomas (9)	Miami Arena; 15,008	15–13
29	January 6	L.A. Clippers	W 110–103	Joe Dumars (24)	Dennis Rodman (23)	Isiah Thomas (10)	The Palace of Auburn Hills; 21,454	16–13
30	January 8	Atlanta	L 92–101	Joe Dumars (27)	Dennis Rodman (26)	Isiah Thomas (10)	The Palace of Auburn Hills; 21,454	16–14
31	January 9	Golden State	L 104–108	Joe Dumars (32)	Dennis Rodman (26)	Isiah Thomas (8)	The Palace of Auburn Hills; 21,454	16–15
32	January 11	San Antonio	L 91–109	Joe Dumars (20)	Dennis Rodman (26)	Joe Dumars (7)	The Palace of Auburn Hills; 21,454	16–16
33	January 13	Dallas	W 112–96	Isiah Thomas (20)	Dennis Rodman (18)	Isiah Thomas (8)	The Palace of Auburn Hills; 21,454	17–16
34	January 14	@ Atlanta	L 91–108	Orlando Woolridge (23)	Dennis Rodman (11)	Isiah Thomas (13)	The Omni; 10,440	17–17
35	January 16	@ Philadelphia	L 108–123	Terry Mills (25)	Terry Mills (15)	Danny Young (10)	The Spectrum; 16,506	17–18
36	January 19	@ Dallas	L 103–113	Isiah Thomas (19)	Bill Laimbeer (14)	Isiah Thomas (4)	Reunion Arena; 11,498	17–19
37	January 21	@ Houston	L 120–126	Joe Dumars (32)	Terry Mills (9)	Isiah Thomas (13)	The Summit; 13,406	17–20
38	January 22	@ San Antonio	L 109–123	Joe Dumars, Gerald Glass (15)	Bill Laimbeer (9)	Isiah Thomas (5)	HemisFair Arena; 16,057	17–21
39	January 25	Phoenix	L 119–121	Joe Dumars (36)	Olden Polynice (15)	Isiah Thomas (12)	The Palace of Auburn Hills; 21,454	17–22
40	January 27	Boston	W 103–94	Terry Mills (25)	Terry Mills (14)	Isiah Thomas (13)	The Palace of Auburn Hills; 21,454	18–22
41	January 29	Minnesota	W 112–103	Joe Dumars (28)	Terry Mills (11)	Mark Aguirre (8)	The Palace of Auburn Hills; 21,454	19–22
42	January 30	@ Indiana	L 106–110	Orlando Woolridge (36)	Olden Polynice (13)	Joe Dumars (6)	Market Square Arena; 16,530	19–23

February: 4–7 (home: 4–3; road: 0–4)

Game	Date	Team	Score	High points	High rebounds	High assists	Location Attendance	Record
43	February 5	@ Cleveland	L 89–109	Joe Dumars, Terry Mills (24)	Olden Polynice (13)	Isiah Thomas (12)	Richfield Coliseum; 20,273	19–24
44	February 7	Seattle	L 101–103	Joe Dumars (25)	Terry Mills (16)	Isiah Thomas (12)	The Palace of Auburn Hills; 21,454	19–25
45	February 9	Miami	L 105–106	Terry Mills (28)	Olden Polynice (10)	Isiah Thomas (12)	The Palace of Auburn Hills; 21,454	19–26
46	February 10	@ New Jersey	L 86–109	Terry Mills (21)	Olden Polynice (11)	Isiah Thomas (4)	Brendan Byrne Arena; 13,225	19–27
47	February 12	New Jersey	W 106–97	Terry Mills (22)	Olden Polynice (18)	Isiah Thomas (14)	The Palace of Auburn Hills; 21,454	20–27
48	February 14	@ Charlotte	L 107–117	Mark Aguirre (23)	Terry Mills (11)	Orlando Woolridge (5)	Charlotte Coliseum; 23,698	20–28
49	February 16	Orlando	W 124–120 (OT)	Joe Dumars (39)	Dennis Rodman (12)	Isiah Thomas (19)	The Palace of Auburn Hills; 21,454	21–28
50	February 17	@ Miami	L 107–111	Mark Aguirre (29)	Dennis Rodman (17)	Joe Dumars (9)	Miami Arena; 15,008	21–29
All-Star Break
51	February 23	Philadelphia	W 101–89	Mark Aguirre (24)	Dennis Rodman (25)	Isiah Thomas (13)	The Palace of Auburn Hills; 21,454	22–29
52	February 26	New York	W 108–80	Joe Dumars (43)	Dennis Rodman (12)	Isiah Thomas (7)	The Palace of Auburn Hills; 21,454	23–29
53	February 27	Milwaukee	L 93–95	Joe Dumars (22)	Dennis Rodman (14)	Isiah Thomas (7)	The Palace of Auburn Hills; 21,454	23–30

March: 9–7 (home: 6–2; road: 3–5)

Game	Date	Team	Score	High points	High rebounds	High assists	Location Attendance	Record
54	March 1	Boston	W 99–95	Terry Mills (41)	Dennis Rodman (19)	Isiah Thomas (10)	The Palace of Auburn Hills; 21,454	24–30
55	March 3	Utah	L 98–106	Isiah Thomas (40)	Dennis Rodman (23)	Joe Dumars (9)	The Palace of Auburn Hills; 21,454	24–31
56	March 5	@ Boston	L 101–105	Joe Dumars (24)	Dennis Rodman (19)	Isiah Thomas (9)	Boston Garden; 14,890	24–32
57	March 7	@ Milwaukee	W 98–91	Joe Dumars (35)	Dennis Rodman (25)	Isiah Thomas (8)	Bradley Center; 18,236	25–32
58	March 9	L.A. Lakers	L 121–123	Joe Dumars (41)	Dennis Rodman (14)	Isiah Thomas (13)	The Palace of Auburn Hills; 21,454	25–33
59	March 11	Denver	W 112–104	Isiah Thomas (33)	Olden Polynice (14)	Isiah Thomas (9)	The Palace of Auburn Hills; 21,454	26–33
60	March 14	Chicago	W 101–99	Joe Dumars (27)	Dennis Rodman (11)	Isiah Thomas (10)	The Palace of Auburn Hills; 21,454	27–33
61	March 16	@ Sacramento	W 113–110	Joe Dumars (31)	Dennis Rodman (22)	Isiah Thomas (9)	ARCO Arena; 17,317	28–33
62	March 17	@ Utah	L 80–104	Isiah Thomas (14)	Dennis Rodman (13)	Isiah Thomas (4)	Delta Center; 19,911	28–34
63	March 19	@ Phoenix	L 97–127	Joe Dumars (31)	Dennis Rodman (13)	Alvin Robertson, Isiah Thomas (6)	America West Arena; 19,023	28–35
64	March 21	@ L.A. Lakers	W 106–101	Joe Dumars (17)	Dennis Rodman (21)	Joe Dumars (9)	Great Western Forum; 15,923	29–35
65	March 22	@ Golden State	L 91–96	Joe Dumars (29)	Dennis Rodman (10)	Isiah Thomas (12)	Oakland-Alameda County Coliseum Arena; 15,025	29–36
66	March 26	Charlotte	W 115–107	Isiah Thomas (40)	Dennis Rodman (25)	Joe Dumars, Alvin Robertson, Danny Young (6)	The Palace of Auburn Hills; 21,454	30–36
67	March 28	Cleveland	W 91–78	Isiah Thomas (31)	Dennis Rodman (21)	Isiah Thomas (10)	The Palace of Auburn Hills; 21,454	31–36
68	March 30	@ Orlando	L 91–105	Isiah Thomas (32)	Dennis Rodman (17)	Alvin Robertson (5)	Orlando Arena; 15,151	31–37
69	March 31	Portland	W 120–111	Joe Dumars (38)	Dennis Rodman (17)	Isiah Thomas (13)	The Palace of Auburn Hills; 21,454	32–37

April: 8–5 (home: 5–1; road: 3–4)

Game	Date	Team	Score	High points	High rebounds	High assists	Location Attendance	Record
70	April 2	Sacramento	W 109–100	Joe Dumars (35)	Dennis Rodman (24)	Isiah Thomas (8)	The Palace of Auburn Hills; 21,454	33–37
71	April 6	Washington	W 91–79	Joe Dumars (38)	Dennis Rodman (24)	Alvin Robertson (8)	The Palace of Auburn Hills; 21,454	34–37
72	April 8	@ New Jersey	W 100–98	Joe Dumars (33)	Dennis Rodman (17)	Isiah Thomas (8)	Brendan Byrne Arena; 20,049	35–37
73	April 9	@ Boston	W 105–90	Isiah Thomas (43)	Dennis Rodman (14)	Isiah Thomas (10)	Boston Garden; 14,890	36–37
74	April 11	@ Washington	W 106–94	Alvin Robertson (26)	Dennis Rodman (17)	Alvin Robertson (4)	Capital Centre; 18,756	37–37
75	April 12	Chicago	L 95–98	Terry Mills (25)	Dennis Rodman (18)	Isiah Thomas (15)	The Palace of Auburn Hills; 21,454	37–38
76	April 14	Atlanta	W 87–84	Terry Mills (24)	Dennis Rodman (22)	Isiah Thomas (7)	The Palace of Auburn Hills; 21,454	38–38
77	April 16	@ Charlotte	L 93–127	Joe Dumars (24)	Olden Polynice (10)	Alvin Robertson (5)	Charlotte Coliseum; 23,698	38–39
78	April 17	@ New York	L 85–95	Mark Aguirre (17)	Dennis Rodman (19)	Isiah Thomas (4)	Madison Square Garden; 19,763	38–40
79	April 20	@ Cleveland	L 81–105	Dennis Rodman (17)	Dennis Rodman (18)	Isiah Thomas (7)	Richfield Coliseum; 19,388	38–41
80	April 22	@ Chicago	L 103–109	Isiah Thomas (28)	Dennis Rodman (24)	Isiah Thomas (6)	Chicago Stadium; 18,676	38–42
81	April 23	Indiana	W 109–104	Bill Laimbeer (24)	Dennis Rodman (15)	Bill Laimbeer, Isiah Thomas (7)	The Palace of Auburn Hills; 21,454	39–42
82	April 25	New Jersey	W 116–110	Olden Polynice (27)	Olden Polynice (13)	Isiah Thomas (10)	The Palace of Auburn Hills; 21,454	40–42

1992–93 schedule

== Player statistics ==
Legend
GP	Games played	GS	Games started	MPG	Minutes per game
FG%	Field-goal percentage	3P%	3-point field-goal percentage	FT%	Free-throw percentage
RPG	Rebounds per game	APG	Assists per game	SPG	Steals per game
BPG	Blocks per game	PPG	Points per game

Player	GP	GS	MPG	FG%	3P%	FT%	RPG	APG	SPG	BPG	PPG
Joe Dumars	77	77	40.2	.466	.375	.864	1.9	4.0	1.0	0.1	23.5
Isiah Thomas	79	79	37.0	.418	.308	.737	2.9	8.5	1.6	0.2	17.6
Terry Mills	81	46	27.0	.461	.278	.791	5.8	1.4	0.5	0.6	14.8
Orlando Woolridge	50	47	29.5	.479	.000	.673	3.5	2.2	0.5	0.5	13.1
Mark Aguirre	51	15	20.7	.443	.361	.767	3.0	2.1	0.3	0.1	9.9
Alvin Robertson	30	22	31.4	.434	.343	.690	4.4	3.6	2.2	0.3	9.3
Bill Laimbeer	79	41	24.5	.509	.370	.894	5.3	1.6	0.6	0.5	8.7
Dennis Rodman	62	55	38.9	.427	.205	.534	18.3	1.6	0.8	0.7	7.5
Olden Polynice	67	18	19.4	.490	.000	.465	6.2	0.4	0.5	0.3	7.3
Gerald Glass	56	5	13.9	.429	.226	.636	2.5	1.2	0.5	0.3	5.3
Melvin Newbern	33	1	9.4	.372	.125	.567	1.1	1.7	0.7	0.0	3.6
Danny Young	65	2	12.9	.413	.324	.875	0.7	1.8	0.5	0.1	2.9
Mark Randall	35	0	6.9	.506	.143	.615	1.6	0.3	0.1	0.1	2.8
Isaiah Morris	25	0	4.1	.456		.750	0.5	0.2	0.1	0.0	2.2
Jeff Ruland	11	0	5.0	.455		.500	1.6	0.2	0.2	0.0	1.1
Darrell Walker	9	2	16.0	.158	.000	.333	2.1	1.0	1.1	0.0	0.9

Player statistics citation:

== Awards and records ==
- Joe Dumars, All-NBA Second Team
- Joe Dumars, NBA All-Defensive First Team
- Dennis Rodman, NBA All-Defensive First Team
