= 1992–93 Orlando Magic season =

NBA professional basketball team season

- Head coach: Matt Guokas
- Arena: Orlando Arena

Results
- Record: 41–41 (.500)
- Place: Division: 4th (Atlantic); Conference: 9th (Eastern)
- Playoff finish: Did not qualify
- Stats at Basketball Reference

Local media
- Television: WKCF; Sunshine Network
- Radio: WDBO

The 1992–93 Orlando Magic season was the fourth season for the Orlando Magic in the National Basketball Association.

== Season summary ==
=== Off-season ===
This season was most memorable when the Magic won the NBA draft lottery, and selected 7' 1" center Shaquille O'Neal out of Louisiana State University with the first overall pick in the 1992 NBA draft. During the off-season, the team signed free agent Donald Royal, and later on signed Tom Tolbert in November. There were predictions that O'Neal would become the next dominant center in the NBA; O'Neal became an instant superstar with merchandising that rivaled only All-Star guard Michael Jordan of the Chicago Bulls.

=== Regular season ===
With the addition of O'Neal and Royal, the Magic got off to a fast start by winning eight of their first eleven games of the regular season, but then posted a six-game losing streak in December afterwards. Also in December, the team traded their future second-round draft pick to the Cleveland Cavaliers in exchange for Steve Kerr. The Magic continued to play around .500 in winning percentage, holding a 24–23 record at the All-Star break. However, the team soon fell below .500 by posting a five-game losing streak in March. The Magic dealt with injuries, as three-point specialist Dennis Scott only played 54 games due to calf and Achilles injuries, and second-year center Brian Williams missed most of the season due to clinical depression, including a suicide attempt, only playing just 21 games.

The Magic managed to win eight of their final twelve games of the season, including two straight victories to close the season. In the final game of the regular season on April 24, 1993, the team defeated the Atlanta Hawks at home, 104–85 at the Orlando Arena; the Magic finished in fourth place in the Atlantic Division with a 41–41 record, which was a 20-game improvement over the previous season. However, the Magic lost a tie-breaker for the final NBA playoff spot in the Eastern Conference to the 8th–seeded Indiana Pacers, who finished with the same record; the Magic and Pacers were 2–2 against each other during the regular season, but the Pacers outscored the Magic, 444–439.

O'Neal averaged 23.4 points, 13.9 rebounds and 3.5 blocks per game, as he was named the NBA Rookie of the Year, receiving 96 out of 98 first-place votes from the media, and was also named to the NBA All-Rookie First Team. In addition, Nick Anderson averaged 19.9 points, 6.0 rebounds and 1.6 steals per game, while Scott averaged 15.9 points per game and led the Magic with 108 three-point field goals, Scott Skiles provided the team with 15.4 points and 9.7 assists per game, and Royal contributed 9.2 points per game off the bench. Meanwhile, Tolbert averaged 8.1 points and 5.7 rebounds per game, Anthony Bowie contributed 8.0 points per game, and Jeff Turner provided with 7.0 points per game.

During the NBA All-Star weekend at the Delta Center in Salt Lake City, Utah, O'Neal was selected for the 1993 NBA All-Star Game, as a member of the Eastern Conference All-Star team; it was his first ever All-Star appearance. O'Neal also finished in seventh place in Most Valuable Player voting. The Magic finished 14th in the NBA in home-game attendance, with an attendance of 621,191 at the Orlando Arena during the regular season.

=== Aftermath ===
Following the season, Kerr signed as a free agent with the Chicago Bulls, while Williams was traded to the Denver Nuggets, head coach Matt Guokas resigned after coaching the Magic for four seasons, Tolbert was released to free agency, and Terry Catledge retired.

== Draft picks ==
Round	Pick	Player	Position	Nationality	School/Club team
1	1	Shaquille O'Neal	C	United States	LSU

== Roster ==
1992–93 Orlando Magic roster
Players

Pos.	No.	Player	Height	Weight	DOB	From
SG	25	Nick Anderson	6 ft 6 in (1.98 m)	205 lb (93 kg)	1968–01–20	Illinois
SG	14	Anthony Bowie	6 ft 6 in (1.98 m)	190 lb (86 kg)	1963–11–09	Oklahoma
PF	33	Terry Catledge	6 ft 8 in (2.03 m)	220 lb (100 kg)	1963–08–22	South Alabama
PG	11	Litterial Green	6 ft 1 in (1.85 m)	185 lb (84 kg)	1970–03–07	Georgia
PG	2	Steve Kerr	6 ft 3 in (1.91 m)	175 lb (79 kg)	1965–09–27	Arizona
C	34	Greg Kite	6 ft 11 in (2.11 m)	250 lb (113 kg)	1961–08–05	BYU
C	32	Shaquille O'Neal	7 ft 1 in (2.16 m)	300 lb (136 kg)	1972–03–06	LSU
SF	5	Donald Royal	6 ft 8 in (2.03 m)	210 lb (95 kg)	1966–05–22	Notre Dame
SF	3	Dennis Scott	6 ft 8 in (2.03 m)	229 lb (104 kg)	1968–09–05	Georgia Tech
PG	4	Scott Skiles	6 ft 1 in (1.85 m)	180 lb (82 kg)	1964–03–05	Michigan State
SF	40	Tom Tolbert	6 ft 7 in (2.01 m)	235 lb (107 kg)	1965–10–16	Arizona
PF	31	Jeff Turner	6 ft 9 in (2.06 m)	230 lb (104 kg)	1962–04–09	Vanderbilt
PF	8	Brian Williams	6 ft 11 in (2.11 m)	260 lb (118 kg)	1969–04–06	Arizona
PF	42	Howard Wright	6 ft 8 in (2.03 m)	220 lb (100 kg)	1967–12–20	Stanford

Coaches
Head coach
- Matt Guokas
Assistant(s)
- Brian Hill

Legend
- (DP) Unsigned draft pick
- (FA) Free agent
- (S) Suspended
- Injured

Roster
Updated: April 8, 1993

== Regular season ==
Shaquille O'Neal was drafted as the 1st overall pick in the 1992 NBA draft by the Orlando Magic. During that summer, prior to moving to Orlando, he spent a significant amount of time in Los Angeles under the tutelage of Hall of Famer Magic Johnson. O'Neal had an exceptional rookie season, as he helped the Magic win 20 more games than the previous season, with the team ultimately missing the playoffs by virtue of a tie-breaker with the Indiana Pacers. O'Neal averaged 23.4 points and 13.9 rebounds per game for the season and was named the 1993 NBA Rookie of the Year. O'Neal played in the All-Star game and scored 14 points. On two occasions during that season, each during a nationally televised game, O'Neal dunked the ball so hard that he broke the backboard support units.

=== Season standings ===
Atlantic Division	W	L	PCT	GB	Home	Road	Div
y-New York Knicks	60	22	.732	—	37–4	23–18	23–5
x-Boston Celtics	48	34	.585	12	28–13	20–21	19–9
x-New Jersey Nets	43	39	.524	17	26–15	17–24	14–14
Orlando Magic	41	41	.500	19	27–14	14–27	15–13
Miami Heat	36	46	.439	24	26–15	10–31	9–19
Philadelphia 76ers	26	56	.317	34	15–26	11–30	11–17
Washington Bullets	22	60	.268	38	15–26	7–34	7–21

y – clinched division title
x – clinched playoff spot

#	Eastern Conference				
#	Team	W	L	PCT	GB
1	c-New York Knicks	60	22	.732	–
2	y-Chicago Bulls	57	25	.695	3
3	x-Cleveland Cavaliers	54	28	.659	6
4	x-Boston Celtics	48	34	.585	12
5	x-Charlotte Hornets	44	38	.537	16
6	x-New Jersey Nets	43	39	.524	17
7	x-Atlanta Hawks	43	39	.524	17
8	x-Indiana Pacers	41	41	.500	19
9	Orlando Magic	41	41	.500	19
10	Detroit Pistons	40	42	.488	20
11	Miami Heat	36	46	.439	24
12	Milwaukee Bucks	28	54	.341	32
13	Philadelphia 76ers	26	56	.317	36
14	Washington Bullets	22	60	.268	38

z – clinched division title
y – clinched division title
x – clinched playoff spot

== Player statistics ==
=== Regular season ===
Player	POS	GP	GS	MP	REB	AST	STL	BLK	PTS	MPG	RPG	APG	SPG	BPG	PPG
Shaquille O'Neal	C	81	81	3,071	1,122	152	60	286	1,893	37.9	13.9	1.9	.7	3.5	23.4
Nick Anderson	SG	79	76	2,920	477	265	128	56	1,574	37.0	6.0	3.4	1.6	.7	19.9
Scott Skiles	PG	78	78	3,086	290	735	86	2	1,201	39.6	3.7	9.4	1.1	.0	15.4
Anthony Bowie	SG	77	45	1,761	194	175	54	14	618	22.9	2.5	2.3	.7	.2	8.0
Donald Royal	SF	77	0	1,636	295	80	36	25	706	21.2	3.8	1.0	.5	.3	9.2
Jeff Turner	PF	75	20	1,479	252	107	19	9	528	19.7	3.4	1.4	.3	.1	7.0
Tom Tolbert	PF	72	61	1,838	412	91	33	21	583	25.5	5.7	1.3	.5	.3	8.1
Greg Kite	C	64	1	640	193	10	13	12	89	10.0	3.0	.2	.2	.2	1.4
Dennis Scott	SF	54	43	1,759	186	136	57	18	858	32.6	3.4	2.5	1.1	.3	15.9
Litterial Green	PG	52	4	626	34	116	23	4	235	12.0	.7	2.2	.4	.1	4.5
Steve Kerr^{†}	SG	47	0	440	38	59	8	1	122	9.4	.8	1.3	.2	.0	2.6
Terry Catledge	PF	21	1	262	46	5	4	1	99	12.5	2.2	.2	.2	.0	4.7
Bison Dele	PF	21	0	240	56	5	14	17	96	11.4	2.7	.2	.7	.8	4.6
Chris Corchiani^{†}	PG	9	0	102	7	16	6	0	42	11.3	.8	1.8	.7	.0	4.7
Howard Wright	PF	4	0	10	2	0	0	0	8	2.5	.5	.0	.0	.0	2.0
Lorenzo Williams^{†}	PF	3	0	10	2	0	1	1	0	3.3	.7	.0	.3	.3	.0

- ^{†} Denotes player spent time with another team in the season. Stats reflect time with the Magic only.

== Awards and honors ==
- Shaquille O'Neal – NBA Rookie of the Year, All-Rookie 1st Team, All-Star
