= 1992–93 Boston Celtics season =

NBA basketball team season

- Head coach: Chris Ford
- General manager: Dave Gavitt
- Arena: Boston Garden; Hartford Civic Center

Results
- Record: 48–34 (.585)
- Place: Division: 2nd (Atlantic); Conference: 4th (Eastern)
- Playoff finish: First round (lost to Hornets 1–3)
- Stats at Basketball Reference

Local media
- Television: WFXT; SportsChannel New England
- Radio: WEEI

The 1992–93 Boston Celtics season was the 47th season for the Boston Celtics in the National Basketball Association. This marked the first season since the 1978–79 season that Hall of Fame player Larry Bird was not on the team; this was also the final season for long-time Celtics All-Star forward Kevin McHale, as he would retire the following off-season.

== Season summary ==
=== Off-season ===
During the off-season, the Celtics signed free agent and former All-Star forward Xavier McDaniel.

=== Regular season ===
In December, the Celtics traded rookie shooting guard, and first-round draft pick Jon Barry out of Georgia Tech University to the Milwaukee Bucks in exchange for Alaa Abdelnaby, and also re-signed free agent John Bagley; Bagley played for the team the previous season, but was not re-signed during the off-season.

Despite the addition of McDaniel, the Celtics got off to a bad start by losing eight of their first ten games of the regular season, as Ed Pinckney only played just seven games due to a knee injury. However, the team recovered by posting a seven-game winning streak in January, and later on held a 26–24 record at the All-Star break. The Celtics posted a nine-game winning streak in March, and won six of their final seven games of the season, finishing in second place in the Atlantic Division with a solid 48–34 record, and earning the fourth seed in the Eastern Conference; the team qualified for the NBA playoffs for the 14th consecutive year.

Reggie Lewis led the Celtics in scoring averaging 20.8 points, 3.7 assists and 1.5 steals per game, while McDaniel averaged 13.5 points and 6.0 rebounds per game, and Kevin Gamble provided the team with 13.3 points per game. In addition, Robert Parish averaged 12.6 points, 9.4 rebounds and 1.4 blocks per game, while Dee Brown contributed 10.9 points, 5.8 assists and 1.7 steals per game, and McHale provided with 10.7 points and 5.0 rebounds per game off the bench, but shot a career-low of .459 in field-goal percentage. Meanwhile, Abdelnaby averaged 8.2 points and 4.8 rebounds per game in 63 games after the trade, Sherman Douglas contributed 7.8 points and 6.4 assists per game, second-year forward Rick Fox contributed 6.4 points per game, Pinckney averaged 4.6 points and 6.1 rebounds per game during his short seven-game stint, and Joe Kleine provided with 3.3 points and 4.4 rebounds per game.

However, McHale briefly feuded with head coach Chris Ford near the end of the regular season over his lack of playing time, which did not help with causing distractions and lack of focus for the Celtics. Abdelnaby finished tied in eleventh place in Most Improved Player voting, while Ford finished in seventh place in Coach of the Year voting. The Celtics finished 18th in the NBA in home-game attendance, with an attendance of 608,495 at the Boston Garden during the regular season.

=== NBA playoffs ===
In the Eastern Conference First Round of the 1993 NBA playoffs, the Celtics faced off against the 5th–seeded Charlotte Hornets, who were led by the trio of All-Star forward Larry Johnson, rookie center Alonzo Mourning, and Muggsy Bogues. However, during Game 1 at the Boston Garden, Lewis collapsed on the court; Lewis scored 17 points in 13 minutes as the Celtics defeated the Hornets at home, 112–101. However, without Lewis for the remainder of the series, the Celtics lost the next three games, which included a Game 4 loss to the Hornets on the road, 104–103 at the Charlotte Coliseum, as Mourning hit a game-winning buzzer-beater; the Celtics lost the series to the Hornets in four games.

=== Aftermath ===
Game 1 of the Celtics-Hornets series would also be the final game for Lewis, as he would die of cardiac arrest during practice three months later at the age of 27, before the following season began. Following the season, Kleine signed as a free agent with the Phoenix Suns, and Bagley signed with the Atlanta Hawks during the next season.

== Draft picks ==
Round	Pick	Player	Position	Nationality	College
1	21	Jon Barry (traded to Milwaukee)	SG	United States	Georgia Tech
2	47	Darren Morningstar	C	United States	Pittsburgh

== Roster ==
1992–93 Boston Celtics roster
Players

Pos.	No.	Player	Height	Weight	DOB	From
PF	4	Alaa Abdelnaby	6 ft 10 in (2.08 m)	240 lb (109 kg)	1968–06–24	Duke
PG	5	John Bagley	6 ft 0 in (1.83 m)	185 lb (84 kg)	1960–04–23	Boston College
PG	7	Dee Brown	6 ft 1 in (1.85 m)	160 lb (73 kg)	1968–11–29	Jacksonville
PG	20	Sherman Douglas	6 ft 0 in (1.83 m)	160 lb (73 kg)	1966–09–15	Syracuse
SF	44	Rick Fox	6 ft 7 in (2.01 m)	230 lb (104 kg)	1969–07–24	North Carolina
SF	34	Kevin Gamble	6 ft 5 in (1.96 m)	210 lb (95 kg)	1965–11–13	Iowa
C	53	Joe Kleine	6 ft 11 in (2.11 m)	255 lb (116 kg)	1962–01–04	Arkansas
SG	35	Reggie Lewis	6 ft 7 in (2.01 m)	195 lb (88 kg)	1965–11–21	Northeastern
SF	31	Xavier McDaniel	6 ft 7 in (2.01 m)	205 lb (93 kg)	1963–06–04	Wichita State
PF	32	Kevin McHale	6 ft 10 in (2.08 m)	210 lb (95 kg)	1957–12–19	Minnesota
C	00	Robert Parish	7 ft 1 in (2.16 m)	230 lb (104 kg)	1953–08–30	Centenary
PF	54	Ed Pinckney	6 ft 9 in (2.06 m)	195 lb (88 kg)	1963–03–27	Villanova
F	43	Lorenzo Williams	6 ft 9 in (2.06 m)	200 lb (91 kg)	1969–07–15	Stetson

Coaches
Head coach
- Chris Ford
Assistant(s)
- Don Casey
- Jon Jennings
- Ed Lacerte (trainer)

Legend
- (DP) Unsigned draft pick
- (FA) Free agent
- (S) Suspended
- Injured

Roster
Updated: March 17, 1993

== Regular season ==
=== Season standings ===
Atlantic Division	W	L	PCT	GB	Home	Road	Div
y-New York Knicks	60	22	.732	—	37–4	23–18	23–5
x-Boston Celtics	48	34	.585	12	28–13	20–21	19–9
x-New Jersey Nets	43	39	.524	17	26–15	17–24	14–14
Orlando Magic	41	41	.500	19	27–14	14–27	15–13
Miami Heat	36	46	.439	24	26–15	10–31	9–19
Philadelphia 76ers	26	56	.317	34	15–26	11–30	11–17
Washington Bullets	22	60	.268	38	15–26	7–34	7–21

y – clinched division title
x – clinched playoff spot

#	Eastern Conference				
#	Team	W	L	PCT	GB
1	c-New York Knicks	60	22	.732	–
2	y-Chicago Bulls	57	25	.695	3
3	x-Cleveland Cavaliers	54	28	.659	6
4	x-Boston Celtics	48	34	.585	12
5	x-Charlotte Hornets	44	38	.537	16
6	x-New Jersey Nets	43	39	.524	17
7	x-Atlanta Hawks	43	39	.524	17
8	x-Indiana Pacers	41	41	.500	19
9	Orlando Magic	41	41	.500	19
10	Detroit Pistons	40	42	.488	20
11	Miami Heat	36	46	.439	24
12	Milwaukee Bucks	28	54	.341	32
13	Philadelphia 76ers	26	56	.317	36
14	Washington Bullets	22	60	.268	38

z – clinched division title
y – clinched division title
x – clinched playoff spot

== Playoffs ==
1993 playoff game log
First round: 1–3 (home: 1–1; road: 0–2)

Game	Date	Team	Score	High points	High rebounds	High assists	Location Attendance	Series
1	April 29	Charlotte	W 112–101	Xavier McDaniel (21)	Douglas, Parish (9)	Sherman Douglas (11)	Boston Garden; 14,890	1–0
2	May 1	Charlotte	L 98–99 (2OT)	Kevin McHale (30)	Robert Parish (16)	Sherman Douglas (10)	Boston Garden; 14,890	1–1
3	May 3	@ Charlotte	L 89–119	Kevin Gamble (19)	Alaa Abdelnaby (6)	Sherman Douglas (8)	Charlotte Coliseum; 23,698	1–2
4	May 5	@ Charlotte	L 103–104	Robert Parish (24)	Robert Parish (9)	Sherman Douglas (9)	Charlotte Coliseum; 23,698	1–3

1993 schedule

== Player statistics ==
Legend
GP	Games played	GS	Games started	MPG	Minutes per game
FG%	Field-goal percentage	3P%	3-point field-goal percentage	FT%	Free-throw percentage
RPG	Rebounds per game	APG	Assists per game	SPG	Steals per game
BPG	Blocks per game	PPG	Points per game

=== Regular season ===
Boston Celtics statistics
Player	GP	GS	MPG	FG%	3P%	FT%	RPG	APG	SPG	BPG	PPG
Alaa Abdelnaby^{†}	63	52	18.3	.525		.760	4.8	.3	.3	.3	8.2
John Bagley	10	0	9.7	.360	.000	.833	.7	2.0	.2	.0	2.3
Kenny Battle	3	1	9.7	.462	.000	1.000	3.7	.7	.3	.0	4.7
Dee Brown	80	48	28.2	.468	.317	.793	3.1	5.8	1.7	.4	10.9
Sherman Douglas	79	36	24.5	.498	.207	.560	2.1	6.4	.6	.1	7.8
Rick Fox	71	14	15.2	.484	.174	.802	2.2	1.6	.9	.3	6.4
Kevin Gamble	82	58	31.0	.507	.374	.826	3.0	2.8	1.0	.5	13.3
Joe Kleine	78	3	14.5	.404	.000	.707	4.4	.5	.2	.2	3.3
Bart Kofoed	7	0	5.9	.231	.000	.786	.1	1.4	.3	.1	2.4
Reggie Lewis	80	80	39.3	.470	.233	.867	4.3	3.7	1.5	1.0	20.8
Xavier McDaniel	82	27	27.0	.495	.273	.793	6.0	2.0	.9	.6	13.5
Kevin McHale	71	0	23.3	.459	.111	.841	5.0	1.0	.2	.8	10.7
Robert Parish	79	79	27.2	.535		.689	9.4	.8	.7	1.4	12.6
Ed Pinckney	7	5	21.6	.417		.923	6.1	.1	.6	1.0	4.6
Marcus Webb	9	0	5.7	.520	.000	.619	1.1	.2	.1	.2	4.3
Lorenzo Williams^{†}	22	7	6.9	.516		.286	2.0	.2	.2	.6	1.5
Joe Wolf^{†}	2	0	4.5	.000		.500	1.5	.0	.0	.5	.5

=== Playoffs ===
Boston Celtics statistics
Player	GP	GS	MPG	FG%	3P%	FT%	RPG	APG	SPG	BPG	PPG
Alaa Abdelnaby	4	4	17.0	.458			3.3	.3	.0	.3	5.5
Dee Brown	4	3	33.3	.366	.143	1.000	1.5	3.8	.5	1.0	11.3
Sherman Douglas	4	4	41.5	.378	.000	.667	6.5	9.5	1.0	.0	11.0
Rick Fox	4	0	17.8	.280	.333	1.000	4.8	1.3	.5	.3	4.3
Kevin Gamble	4	4	35.5	.548	.417	1.000	2.3	2.5	1.5	.3	13.8
Joe Kleine	4	0	7.3	.600			1.3	.0	.0	.3	1.5
Reggie Lewis	1	1	13.0	.636	.000	.750	2.0	1.0	.0	1.0	17.0
Xavier McDaniel	4	0	31.5	.415	.000	.667	4.5	2.3	.3	.8	12.5
Kevin McHale	4	0	28.3	.582		.857	7.3	.8	.5	1.8	19.0
Robert Parish	4	4	36.5	.544		.857	9.5	1.3	.3	1.5	17.0
Lorenzo Williams	1	0	3.0	1.000			1.0	.0	.0	.0	2.0

- ^{†} Denotes player spent time with another team in the season. Stats reflect time with the Celtics only.

Player statistics citation:

== See also ==
- 1992–93 NBA season
