= David J. Halberstam =

American radio sports announcer and executive (1951–2026)

David J. Halberstam (October 7, 1951 – June 2, 2026) was an American sports broadcaster and radio executive who was the EVP/General Manager of Westwood One Sports from 2006 to 2008. Previously, he was the play-by-play announcer for the Miami Heat and St. John's basketball.

== Broadcasting ==
A graduate of Hunter College, Halberstam spent the first eleven years of his career calling basketball games for NCAA Division III colleges in New York City. He was the radio play-by-play announcer for the St. John's Red Storm men's basketball team from 1982 to 1992. From 1988 to 1992, he was also the backup radio announcer for the New York Knicks. In 1992, he became the radio play-by-play announcer for the Miami Heat. During a March 19, 1997 game against the Golden State Warriors, Halberstam stated that he believed Thomas Jefferson's slaves "would have made good basketball players", which led to a $2,500 fine from the National Basketball Association. He was fired after the 1997–98 season.

From 2011 to 2019, Halberstam was the play-by-play announcer for the Nova Southeastern Sharks men's basketball team.

== Radio executive ==
Halberstam spent a decade working in the sports department at Katz Radio Group. He then served as president of Word Picture Sports, which held the radio rights to the Knicks and New York Rangers. From 1992 to 1998, he was director of corporate sales for the Miami Heat.

In 1999, he joined Westwood One as vice president of sports sales. He later became the company's senior VP of vice president of sports sales and marketing and in 2006 was promoted to the newly-created position of executive vice president and general manager of Westwood One Sports. He left Westwood One in 2008.

== Writing ==
In 1999, Halberstam published Sports on New York Radio: A Play-by-Play History. In 2016, he authored "The Fundamentals of Sports Media and Sponsorship Sales: Developing New Accounts."

In early 2018, Halberstam launched the website, Sports Broadcast Journal, which evaluates the work of sports broadcasters and covers the sports media world.

== Death ==
Halberstam died on June 2, 2026, at the age of 74, of brain cancer.
