= 1993–94 Los Angeles Lakers season =

NBA professional basketball team season

- Head coach: Randy Pfund (fired); Bill Bertka (interim); Magic Johnson
- General manager: Jerry West
- Owner: Jerry Buss
- Arena: Great Western Forum

Results
- Record: 33–49 (.402)
- Place: Division: 5th (Pacific); Conference: 9th (Western)
- Playoff finish: Did not qualify
- Stats at Basketball Reference

Local media
- Television: KCAL-TV; Prime Sports West
- Radio: KLAC

The 1993–94 Los Angeles Lakers season was the 46th season for the Los Angeles Lakers in the National Basketball Association, and their 34th season in Los Angeles, California.

== Season summary ==
=== Off-season ===
The Lakers had the twelfth overall pick in the 1993 NBA draft, and selected small forward George Lynch from the University of North Carolina, and also selected point guard Nick Van Exel from the University of Cincinnati with the 37th overall pick. During the off-season, the team acquired Sam Bowie from the New Jersey Nets, and re-signed free agent and former Lakers forward Kurt Rambis.

=== Regular season ===
Despite the addition of Van Exel, Lynch and Bowie, and with the return of Rambis, the Lakers struggled losing nine of their first twelve games of the regular season, then lost 10 of their 14 games in December, and later on held a 18–29 record at the All-Star break. Head coach Randy Pfund was fired after a 27–37 start to the season, and was replaced with interim Bill Bertka for the next two games. With the team out of playoff position and struggling in March, the Lakers decided to bring back retired All-Star guard, and legend Magic Johnson as their new coach. At mid-season, the team acquired Danny Schayes from the Milwaukee Bucks. Under Johnson, the Lakers won five of their next six games; however, the team struggled and lost their final ten games of the season, and finished in fifth place in the Pacific Division with a disappointing 33–49 record. The Lakers failed to qualify for the NBA playoffs for the first time since the 1975–76 season, ending a 17-year playoff streak.

Vlade Divac averaged 14.2 points, 10.8 rebounds, 3.9 assists and 1.4 blocks per game, while second-year guard Anthony Peeler averaged 14.1 points and 1.4 steals per game, but only played just 30 games due to a stress fracture in his left leg, and tendonitis in his right leg, and Van Exel provided the team with 13.6 points and 5.8 assists per game, led them with 123 three-point field goals, and was named to the NBA All-Rookie Second Team. In addition, Sedale Threatt contributed 11.9 points, 4.2 assists and 1.4 steals per game, while Elden Campbell averaged 12.3 points, 6.8 rebounds and 1.9 blocks per game, second-year guard Doug Christie provided with 10.3 points and 1.4 steals per game, and James Worthy averaged 10.2 points per game off the bench. Meanwhile, Lynch averaged 9.6 points and 5.8 rebounds per game, Bowie provided with 8.9 points and 5.2 rebounds per game, and Tony Smith contributed 8.8 points per game.

During the NBA All-Star weekend at the Target Center in Minneapolis, Minnesota, Van Exel was selected for the inaugural NBA Rookie Game, as a member of the Sensations team. Meanwhile, Christie was selected to participate in the NBA Slam Dunk Contest, but withdrew due to injury, and was replaced with Antonio Davis of the Indiana Pacers. The Lakers finished 21st in the NBA in home-game attendance, with an attendance of 545,915 at the Great Western Forum during the regular season.

=== Aftermath ===
Following the season, Johnson resigned as head coach, while Worthy retired after twelve seasons in the NBA with the Lakers, Christie was traded to the New York Knicks, and Schayes signed as a free agent with the Phoenix Suns.

== Draft picks ==
Round	Pick	Player	Position	Nationality	College
1	12	George Lynch	SF/PF	United States	North Carolina
2	37	Nick Van Exel	PG	United States	Cincinnati

== Roster ==
1993–94 Los Angeles Lakers roster
Players

Pos.	No.	Player	Height	Weight	DOB	From
C	31	Sam Bowie	7 ft 1 in (2.16 m)	235 lb (107 kg)	1961–03–17	Kentucky
F	41	Elden Campbell	6 ft 11 in (2.11 m)	215 lb (98 kg)	1968–07–23	Clemson
G	8	Doug Christie	6 ft 6 in (1.98 m)	200 lb (91 kg)	1970–05–09	Pepperdine
C	12	Vlade Divac	7 ft 1 in (2.16 m)	243 lb (110 kg)	1968–02–03	Yugoslavia
C	53	James Edwards	7 ft 0 in (2.13 m)	225 lb (102 kg)	1955–11–22	Washington
F	40	Antonio Harvey	6 ft 11 in (2.11 m)	225 lb (102 kg)	1970–07–06	Pfeiffer
G	23	Reggie Jordan	6 ft 4 in (1.93 m)	195 lb (88 kg)	1968–01–26	New Mexico
F	24	George Lynch	6 ft 8 in (2.03 m)	218 lb (99 kg)	1970–09–03	North Carolina
G	1	Anthony Peeler	6 ft 4 in (1.93 m)	208 lb (94 kg)	1969–11–25	Missouri
F	30	Kurt Rambis	6 ft 8 in (2.03 m)	213 lb (97 kg)	1958–02–25	Santa Clara
C	26	Danny Schayes	6 ft 11 in (2.11 m)	225 lb (102 kg)	1959–05–10	Syracuse
G	34	Tony Smith	6 ft 3 in (1.91 m)	185 lb (84 kg)	1968–06–14	Marquette
G	3	Sedale Threatt	6 ft 2 in (1.88 m)	175 lb (79 kg)	1961–09–10	West Virginia Tech
G	9	Nick Van Exel	6 ft 1 in (1.85 m)	170 lb (77 kg)	1971–11–27	Cincinnati
F	42	James Worthy	6 ft 9 in (2.06 m)	225 lb (102 kg)	1961–02–27	North Carolina

Coaches
Head coach
- Randy Pfund (fired)
- Bill Bertka (interim)
- Magic Johnson
Assistant(s)
- Bill Bertka
- Michael Cooper
- Larry Drew
- Chet Kammerer

Legend
- (DP) Unsigned draft pick
- (FA) Free agent
- (S) Suspended
- Injured

Roster
Updated: 1994–02–24

== Regular season ==
=== Season standings ===
Pacific Division	W	L	PCT	GB	Home	Road	Div
y-Seattle SuperSonics	63	19	.768	—	37–4	26–15	25–5
x-Phoenix Suns	56	26	.683	7	36–5	20–21	19–11
x-Golden State Warriors	50	32	.610	13	29–12	21–20	19–11
x-Portland Trail Blazers	47	35	.573	16	30–11	17–24	17–13
Los Angeles Lakers	33	49	.402	30	21–20	12–29	7–23
Sacramento Kings	28	54	.341	35	20–21	8–33	9–21
Los Angeles Clippers	27	55	.329	36	17–24	10–31	9–21

#	Western Conference				
#	Team	W	L	PCT	GB
1	z-Seattle SuperSonics	63	19	.768	–
2	y-Houston Rockets	58	24	.707	5
3	x-Phoenix Suns	56	26	.683	7
4	x-San Antonio Spurs	55	27	.671	8
5	x-Utah Jazz	53	29	.646	10
6	x-Golden State Warriors	50	32	.610	13
7	x-Portland Trail Blazers	47	35	.573	16
8	x-Denver Nuggets	42	40	.512	21
9	Los Angeles Lakers	33	49	.402	30
10	Sacramento Kings	28	54	.341	35
11	Los Angeles Clippers	27	55	.329	36
12	Minnesota Timberwolves	20	62	.244	43
13	Dallas Mavericks	13	69	.159	50

z - clinched division title
y - clinched division title
x - clinched playoff spot

== Game log ==
=== Regular season ===
1993–94 game log
Total: 33–49 (Home: 21–20; Road: 12–29)
November: 5–9 (home: 3–3; road: 2–6)

Game	Date	Team	Score	High points	High rebounds	High assists	Location Attendance	Record
1	November 5	Phoenix	W 116-108	Nick Van Exel (23)	Vlade Divac (8)	Tony Smith (9)	Great Western Forum; 17,505	1–0
2	November 6	@ Seattle	L 101-129	Nick Van Exel (19)	Vlade Divac (12)	Nick Van Exel (5)	Seattle Center Coliseum; 14,813	1-1
3	November 9	Portland	L 102-109	James Worthy (21)	Vlade Divac (12)	Nick Van Exel (10)	Great Western Forum; 11,476	1–2
4	November 10	@ Sacramento	L 101-112	James Worthy (20)	Vlade Divac (15)	Nick Van Exel (9)	ARCO Arena; 17,317	1–3
5	November 12	Denver	L 84-113	Doug Christie (21)	Tony Smith (8)	Nick Van Exel (4)	Great Western Forum; 11,215	1–4
6	November 14	Cleveland	W 107-100	Bowie & Christie (18)	Vlade Divac (13)	Nick Van Exel (6)	Great Western Forum; 11,139	2–4
7	November 16	L.A. Clippers	W 116-114 (2OT)	3 players tied (23)	Vlade Divac (24)	Nick Van Exel (9)	Great Western Forum; 11,012	3–4
8	November 18	@ Golden State	L 76-103	Elden Campbell (15)	Christie & Divac (7)	Nick Van Exel (4)	Oakland-Alameda County Coliseum Arena; 15,025	3–5
9	November 19	Chicago	L 86-88	Doug Christie (22)	Campbell & Divac (7)	Nick Van Exel (9)	Great Western Forum; 15,512	3–6
10	November 21	@ New Jersey	L 102-105	Sedale Threatt (30)	Vlade Divac (14)	Vlade Divac (4)	Brendan Byrne Arena; 12,205	3–7
11	November 23	@ Atlanta	L 94-103	Nick Van Exel (22)	Campbell & Divac (11)	Nick Van Exel (5)	Omni Coliseum; 10,920	3–8
12	November 24	@ Charlotte	L 124-141	Anthony Peeler (21)	Vlade Divac (7)	Sedale Threatt (10)	Charlotte Coliseum; 23,698	3–9
13	November 26	@ Indiana	W 102-100	Anthony Peeler (21)	Divac & Peeler (8)	James Worthy (8)	Market Square Arena; 16,313	4–9
14	November 27	@ Minnesota	W 96-92	Vlade Divac (20)	Vlade Divac (12)	Threatt & Van Exel (5)	Target Center; 18,354	5–9

December : 4–10 (home: 1–5; road: 3–5)

Game	Date	Team	Score	High points	High rebounds	High assists	Location Attendance	Record
15	December 1	Dallas	W 124-91	Elden Campbell (18)	Vlade Divac (8)	Nick Van Exel (11)	Great Western Forum; 10,319	6–9
16	December 4	@ L.A. Clippers	W 109-102	Doug Christie (33)	Sam Bowie (9)	3 players tied (7)	Los Angeles Memorial Sports Arena; 16,005	7–9
17	December 5	Minnesota	L 99-101	Doug Christie (21)	Campbell & Divac (7)	Nick Van Exel (7)	Great Western Forum; 11,256	7–10
18	December 7	New York	L 78-92	Sam Bowie (20)	Elden Campbell (12)	Threatt & Van Exel (5)	Great Western Forum; 14,147	7–11
19	December 10	@ Portland	L 99-117	Elden Campbell (22)	Elden Campbell (9)	Sam Bowie (6)	Memorial Coliseum; 12,888	7–12
20	December 12	Golden State	L 97-100	Doug Christie (19)	Sam Bowie (8)	Sedale Threatt (8)	Great Western Forum; 11,477	7–13
21	December 14	@ Detroit	W 99-93	Sam Bowie (21)	Elden Campbell (10)	James Worthy (4)	The Palace of Auburn Hills; 20,236	8–13
22	December 16	@ New York	L 85-108	Christie & Worthy (14)	Vlade Divac (13)	Nick Van Exel (7)	Madison Square Garden; 19,763	8–14
23	December 17	@ Philadelphia	L 94-105	James Worthy (22)	Campbell & Divac (9)	Nick Van Exel (8)	The Spectrum; 15,239	8–15
24	December 19	@ Cleveland	L 92-122	Nick Van Exel (16)	Elden Campbell (10)	Nick Van Exel (8)	Richfield Coliseum; 17,308	8–16
25	December 21	@ Orlando	W 109-102	Doug Christie (31)	Vlade Divac (11)	Anthony Peeler (6)	Orlando Arena; 15,291	9–16
26	December 23	@ Miami	L 92-109	Nick Van Exel (16)	Vlade Divac (11)	Doug Christie (5)	Miami Arena; 15,200	9–17
27	December 26	Houston	L 93-118	Doug Christie (20)	Vlade Divac (11)	Divac & Peeler (5)	Great Western Forum; 15,393	9–18
28	December 29	Seattle	L 92-99	Elden Campbell (20)	Campbell & Divac (13)	Sedale Threatt (10)	Great Western Forum; 15,599	9–19

January : 5–7 (home: 4–3; road: 1–4)

Game	Date	Team	Score	High points	High rebounds	High assists	Location Attendance	Record
29	January 2	@ San Antonio	L 92-94	Anthony Peeler (27)	Elden Campbell (12)	Sedale Threatt (7)	Alamodome; 18,017	9-20
30	January 4	@ Denver	W 119-118	James Worthy (27)	Vlade Divac (13)	Christie & Threatt (4)	McNichols Sports Arena; 17,171	10–20
31	January 5	@ Sacramento	L 98-106	Sedale Threatt (20)	Vlade Divac (19)	3 players tied (3)	ARCO Arena; 17,317	10–21
32	January 7	L.A. Clippers	W 111-108	Anthony Peeler (26)	Vlade Divac (16)	Sedale Threatt (7)	Great Western Forum; 14,321	11–21
33	January 9	San Antonio	L 89-95	Nick Van Exel (19)	Vlade Divac (8)	Peeler & Threatt (5)	Great Western Forum; 11,069	11–22
34	January 11	Golden State	L 117-122	Nick Van Exel (28)	Vlade Divac (9)	Divac & Van Exel (7)	Great Western Forum; 11,735	11–23
35	January 14	Charlotte	L 122-130	Nick Van Exel (29)	George Lynch (10)	Vlade Divac (8)	Great Western Forum; 16,011	11–24
36	January 18	@ Seattle	L 88-103	Nick Van Exel (22)	Vlade Divac (15)	Tony Smith (4)	Seattle Center Coliseum; 14,627	11–25
37	January 20	Phoenix	W 107-102	James Worthy (22)	Vlade Divac (13)	Lynch & Van Exel (6)	Great Western Forum; 14,741	12–25
38	January 21	@ Portland	L 93-111	Elden Campbell (27)	George Lynch (9)	Nick Van Exel (10)	Memorial Coliseum; 12,888	12–26
39	January 26	Indiana	W 103-99	Vlade Divac (26)	Vlade Divac (11)	Vlade Divac (7)	Great Western Forum; 11,577	13–26
40	January 28	Detroit	W 105-97	Lynch & Threatt (20)	George Lynch (18)	Nick Van Exel (8)	Great Western Forum; 13,235	14–26

February : 6–7 (home: 4–3; road: 2–4)

Game	Date	Team	Score	High points	High rebounds	High assists	Location Attendance	Record
41	February 1	@ San Antonio	L 97-112	Nick Van Exel (24)	Elden Campbell (10)	Campbell & Van Exel (4)	Alamodome; 17,397	14–27
42	February 3	@ Houston	L 88-99	Elden Campbell (29)	Vlade Divac (15)	Sedale Threatt (4)	The Summit; 12,092	14–28
43	February 4	@ Dallas	W 95-87	George Lynch (26)	Vlade Divac (19)	Vlade Divac (7)	Reunion Arena; 15,482	15–28
44	February 6	Utah	W 107-90	Reggie Jordan (28)	Vlade Divac (23)	Vlade Divac (9)	Great Western Forum; 11,777	16–28
45	February 8	Phoenix	W 107-104	Sedale Threatt (26)	Vlade Divac (15)	Divac & Threatt (8)	Great Western Forum; 12,100	17–28
46	February 9	@ Utah	W 103-96	Sedale Threatt (25)	George Lynch (12)	Nick Van Exel (6)	Delta Center; 19,911	18–28
47	February 10	Sacramento	L 84-103	Nick Van Exel (17)	George Lynch (16)	Nick Van Exel (5)	Great Western Forum; 10,785	18–29
All-Star Break
48	February 15	L.A. Clippers	L 89-100	James Worthy (15)	Vlade Divac (16)	Vlade Divac (12)	Great Western Forum; 11,954	18–30
49	February 18	@ Phoenix	L 96-113	Elden Campbell (25)	Elden Campbell (10)	3 players tied (4)	American West Arena; 19,023	18–31
50	February 20	Philadelphia	W 107-95	Sedale Threatt (21)	Vlade Divac (9)	James Worthy (7)	Great Western Forum; 11,662	19–31
51	February 24	@ Sacramento	L 90-102	Sedale Threatt (28)	Vlade Divac (16)	3 players tied (5)	ARCO Arena; 17,317	19–32
52	February 25	San Antonio	L 110-126	Vlade Divac (21)	Vlade Divac (10)	Sedale Threatt (9)	Great Western Forum; 13,783	19–33
53	February 27	Boston	W 100-97	Vlade Divac (28)	Vlade Divac (13)	Nick Van Exel (12)	Great Western Forum; 13,063	20–33

March : 10–6 (home: 6–1; road: 4–5)

Game	Date	Team	Score	High points	High rebounds	High assists	Location Attendance	Record
54	March 2	@ Chicago	W 97-89	Vlade Divac (27)	Vlade Divac (11)	Sedale Threatt (10)	Chicago Stadium; 18,146	21–33
55	March 4	@ Boston	L 99-109	Nick Van Exel (26)	Vlade Divac (11)	Sedale Threatt (8)	Boston Garden; 14,890	21–34
56	March 5	@ Washington	L 118-124	Sedale Threatt (32)	Vlade Divac (14)	Divac & Van Exel (7)	USAir Arena; 18,756	21–35
57	March 7	@ Milwaukee	W 106-84	Tony Smith (25)	3 players tied (10)	Divac & Van Exel (5)	Bradley Center; 14,978	22–35
58	March 10	Dallas	W 106-101	Vlade Divac (22)	Vlade Divac (17)	Vlade Divac (12)	Great Western Forum; 11,149	23–35
59	March 13	@ Minnesota	W 90-88	Vlade Divac (18)	Vlade Divac (13)	Sedale Threatt (11)	Target Center; 17,255	24–35
60	March 14	@ Utah	L 101-102	Nick Van Exel (22)	Vlade Divac (13)	Vlade Divac (7)	Delta Center; 19,911	24–36
61	March 16	Washington	W 129-94	Nick Van Exel (21)	3 players tied (10)	Nick Van Exel (11)	Great Western Forum; 11,004	25–36
62	March 18	New Jersey	L 90-102	Vlade Divac (18)	Vlade Divac (11)	Nick Van Exel (10)	Great Western Forum; 12,251	25–37
63	March 20	Orlando	W 97-91	Sedale Threatt (30)	Elden Campbell (13)	Vlade Divac (9)	Great Western Forum; 17,505	26–37
64	March 21	Miami	W 84-81	Sedale Threatt (23)	Vlade Divac (15)	Divac & Van Exel (6)	Great Western Forum; 11,497	27–37
65	March 23	@ Dallas	W 112-109	Nick Van Exel (28)	Elden Campbell (13)	Divac & Van Exel (6)	Reunion Arena; 12,484	28–37
66	March 24	@ Houston	L 107-113	Elden Campbell (25)	Divac & Lynch (9)	Vlade Divac (7)	The Summit; 14,688	28–38
67	March 27	Milwaukee	W 110-101	George Lynch (30)	Vlade Divac (19)	Nick Van Exel (8)	Great Western Forum; 17,505	29–38
68	March 29	Minnesota	W 91-89	Elden Campbell (27)	Vlade Divac (11)	Nick Van Exel (8)	Great Western Forum; 13,588	30–38
69	March 31	@ Seattle	L 92-95	Elden Campbell (19)	Campbell & Lynch (7)	Tony Smith (6)	Seattle Center Coliseum; 14,813	30–39

April : 3–10 (home: 3–5; road: 0–5)

Game	Date	Team	Score	High points	High rebounds	High assists	Location Attendance	Record
70	April 1	Houston	W 101-88	Nick Van Exel (31)	Vlade Divac (13)	3 players tied (4)	Great Western Forum; 15,316	31–39
71	April 3	Atlanta	W 101-89	Elden Campbell (17)	Elden Campbell (10)	Nick Van Exel (10)	Great Western Forum; 14,249	32–39
72	April 6	Sacramento	W 128-123 (OT)	James Worthy (31)	Vlade Divac (14)	3 players tied (8)	Great Western Forum; 12,066	33–39
73	April 8	Denver	L 99-112	Vlade Divac (33)	Vlade Divac (9)	Van Exel & Worthy (10)	Great Western Forum; 17,505	33–40
74	April 9	@ Portland	L 104-112	Tony Smith (18)	Vlade Divac (12)	Sedale Threatt (7)	Memorial Coliseum; 12,888	33–41
75	April 12	Golden State	L 117-128	Tony Smith (22)	Vlade Divac (11)	Nick Van Exel (11)	Great Western Forum; 13,302	33–42
76	April 13	@ Phoenix	L 88-117	Tony Smith (22)	3 players tied (7)	Nick Van Exel (8)	American West Arena; 19,023	33–43
77	April 15	Portland	L 100-105	Elden Campbell (21)	Vlade Divac (10)	Nick Van Exel (10)	Great Western Forum; 14,494	33–44
78	April 16	@ L.A. Clippers	L 103-108	Nick Van Exel (28)	George Lynch (12)	Nick Van Exel (5)	Los Angeles Memorial Sports Arena; 16,005	33–45
79	April 19	@ Denver	L 98-105	Vlade Divac (22)	Campbell & Divac (8)	Tony Smith (6)	McNichols Sports Arena; 17,171	33–46
80	April 20	Seattle	L 90-112	Sedale Threatt (28)	Doug Christie (8)	Christie & Threatt (7)	Great Western Forum; 15,283	33–47
81	April 23	@ Golden State	L 91-126	Tony Smith (19)	3 players tied (8)	Christie & Van Exel (5)	Oakland-Alameda County Coliseum Arena; 15,025	33–48
82	April 24	Utah	L 97-103	Nick Van Exel (21)	Kurt Rambis (9)	Nick Van Exel (9)	Great Western Forum; 15,338	33–49

1993–94 schedule

== Player statistics ==
Legend
GP	Games played	GS	Games started	MPG	Minutes per game
FG%	Field-goal percentage	3P%	3-point field-goal percentage	FT%	Free-throw percentage
RPG	Rebounds per game	APG	Assists per game	SPG	Steals per game
BPG	Blocks per game	PPG	Points per game

=== Regular season ===
Los Angeles Lakers statistics
Player	GP	GS	MPG	FG%	3P%	FT%	RPG	APG	SPG	BPG	PPG
Sam Bowie	25	7	22.2	.436	.250	.867	5.2	1.9	.2	1.1	8.9
Elden Campbell	76	74	29.6	.462	.000	.689	6.8	1.1	.8	1.9	12.3
Doug Christie	65	34	23.3	.434	.328	.697	3.6	2.1	1.4	.4	10.3
Vlade Divac	79	73	34.0	.506	.191	.686	10.8	3.9	1.2	1.4	14.2
James Edwards	45	2	10.4	.464		.684	1.4	.5	.1	.1	4.7
Antonio Harvey	27	6	9.1	.367		.462	2.2	.2	.3	.7	2.6
Reggie Jordan	23	0	11.3	.427	.500	.686	2.9	1.1	.6	.2	5.4
George Lynch	71	46	24.8	.508	.000	.596	5.8	1.4	1.4	.4	9.6
Anthony Peeler	30	30	30.8	.430	.222	.803	3.6	3.1	1.4	.3	14.1
Kurt Rambis	50	1	12.7	.518	.000	.648	3.8	.6	.4	.5	3.3
Danny Schayes^{†}	13	0	10.2	.368		.800	2.6	.6	.4	.2	2.8
Tony Smith	73	31	22.2	.441	.320	.714	2.7	2.0	.8	.2	8.8
Sedale Threatt	81	20	28.1	.482	.152	.890	1.9	4.2	1.4	.2	11.9
Nick Van Exel	81	80	33.3	.394	.338	.781	2.9	5.8	1.0	.1	13.6
Trevor Wilson^{†}	5	4	25.2	.487		.520	5.6	2.4	1.0	.2	10.2
James Worthy	80	2	20.0	.406	.288	.741	2.3	1.9	.6	.2	10.2

- ^{†} Denotes player spent time with another team in the season. Stats reflect time with the Lakers only.

Player statistics citation:
