= 1993–94 Sacramento Kings season =

NBA professional basketball team season

- Head coach: Garry St. Jean
- Owner: Jim Thomas
- Arena: ARCO Arena

Results
- Record: 28–54 (.341)
- Place: Division: 6th (Pacific); Conference: 10th (Western)
- Playoff finish: Did not qualify
- Stats at Basketball Reference

Local media
- Television: KRBK-TV; SportsChannel Pacific
- Radio: KRAK

The 1993–94 Sacramento Kings season was the 45th season for the Sacramento Kings in the National Basketball Association, and their ninth season in Sacramento, California.

== Season summary ==
=== Off-season ===
The Kings received the seventh overall pick in the 1993 NBA draft, and selected point guard Bobby Hurley out of Duke University.

=== Regular season ===
With the addition of Hurley, the Kings got off to a 4–5 start to the regular season, but then continued to struggle posting an eight-game losing streak between November and December afterwards, and losing 12 of their next 13 games, leading to an awful 5–17 start to the season. On December 12, 1993, Hurley was seriously injured in a life-threatening car accident, following a 112–102 home loss to the Los Angeles Clippers at the ARCO Arena II. Hurley, who was not wearing a seatbelt, was thrown from his vehicle into a ditch after a collision with another vehicle; he suffered two collapsed lungs, multiple rib fractures, and also suffered trauma to the head, back and neck. Hurley was out for the remainder of the season after only playing just 19 games, averaging 7.1 points and 6.1 assists per game.

With Hurley out, Spud Webb returned to the starting lineup after playing off the bench as backup point guard for Hurley. Also in December, the team signed free agents Trevor Wilson and LaBradford Smith, who were previously released by the Los Angeles Lakers and the Washington Bullets, respectively. The Kings posted a seven-game losing streak in January, and later on held a 15–32 record at the All-Star break. At mid-season, the team traded Pete Chilcutt to the Detroit Pistons in exchange for Olden Polynice. The Kings posted a six-game losing streak in March, and finished in sixth place in the Pacific Division with a 28–54 record, missing the NBA playoffs for the eighth consecutive year.

Mitch Richmond averaged 23.4 points, 4.0 assists and 1.3 steals per game, led the Kings with 127 three-point field goals, and was named to the All-NBA Second Team. In addition, Wayman Tisdale averaged 16.7 points and 7.1 rebounds per game, while Lionel Simmons provided the team with 15.1 points, 7.5 rebounds, 4.1 assists and 1.4 steals per game, Webb contributed 12.7 points and 6.7 assists per game, and Polynice averaged 9.8 points and 11.4 rebounds per game in 31 games after the trade. Off the bench, second-year forward Walt Williams provided with 11.2 points per game, but only played 57 games due to a stress fracture in his left leg, while Wilson averaged 8.0 points per game in 52 games, Randy Brown contributed 4.5 points per game, and Duane Causwell averaged 4.4 points, 4.5 rebounds and 1.2 blocks per game, but only played just 41 games due to injury.

During the NBA All-Star weekend at the Target Center in Minneapolis, Minnesota, Richmond was selected for the 1994 NBA All-Star Game, as a member of the Western Conference All-Star team, and also participated in the NBA Three-Point Shootout for the second time. Polynice finished tied in seventh place in Most Improved Player voting. The Kings finished tenth in the NBA in home-game attendance, with an attendance of 710,497 at the ARCO Arena II during the regular season.

=== Aftermath ===
Following the season, Tisdale signed as a free agent with the Phoenix Suns, and Wilson and Smith were both released to free agency.

== Draft picks ==
| Round | Pick | Player | Position | Nationality | College |
|---|---|---|---|---|---|
| 1 | 7 | Bobby Hurley | PG | United States | Duke |
| 2 | 31 | Evers Burns | PF | United States | Maryland |
| 2 | 44 | Alex Holcombe | | United States | Baylor |
| 2 | 52 | Mike Peplowski | C | United States | Michigan State |

== Roster ==
1993–94 Sacramento Kings roster
Players

| Pos. | No. | Player | Height | Weight | DOB | From |
|---|---|---|---|---|---|---|
| C | 45 | Randy Breuer | 7 ft 3 in (2.21 m) | 230 lb (104 kg) | 1960–10–11 | Minnesota |
| G | 3 | Randy Brown | 6 ft 2 in (1.88 m) | 190 lb (86 kg) | 1968–05–22 | New Mexico State |
| C | 31 | Duane Causwell | 7 ft 0 in (2.13 m) | 240 lb (109 kg) | 1968–05–31 | Temple |
| G | 7 | Bobby Hurley (injured) | 6 ft 0 in (1.83 m) | 165 lb (75 kg) | 1971–06–28 | Duke |
| C | 54 | Mike Peplowski | 6 ft 10 in (2.08 m) | 270 lb (122 kg) | 1970–10–15 | Michigan State |
| C | 0 | Olden Polynice | 6 ft 11 in (2.11 m) | 220 lb (100 kg) | 1964–11–21 | Virginia |
| G | 2 | Mitch Richmond | 6 ft 5 in (1.96 m) | 215 lb (98 kg) | 1965–06–30 | Kansas State |
| F | 22 | Lionel Simmons | 6 ft 7 in (2.01 m) | 210 lb (95 kg) | 1968–11–14 | La Salle |
| G | 15 | LaBradford Smith | 6 ft 3 in (1.91 m) | 200 lb (91 kg) | 1969–04–03 | Louisville |
| F | 24 | Andre Spencer | 6 ft 6 in (1.98 m) | 210 lb (95 kg) | 1964–07–20 | Northern Arizona |
| F | 23 | Wayman Tisdale | 6 ft 9 in (2.06 m) | 240 lb (109 kg) | 1964–06–09 | Oklahoma |
| G | 4 | Spud Webb | 5 ft 6 in (1.68 m) | 133 lb (60 kg) | 1963–07–13 | NC State |
| F | 42 | Walt Williams | 6 ft 8 in (2.03 m) | 219 lb (99 kg) | 1970–04–16 | Maryland |
| F | 21 | Trevor Wilson | 6 ft 7 in (2.01 m) | 210 lb (95 kg) | 1968–03–16 | UCLA |

Coaches
Head coach
- Garry St. Jean
Assistant(s)
- Mike Bratz
- Eddie Jordan
- Mike Schuler

Legend
- (DP) Unsigned draft pick
- (FA) Free agent
- (S) Suspended
- Injured

== Regular season ==
=== Season standings ===
| Pacific Division | W | L | PCT | GB | Home | Road | Div |
|---|---|---|---|---|---|---|---|
| y-Seattle SuperSonics | 63 | 19 | .768 | — | 37–4 | 26–15 | 25–5 |
| x-Phoenix Suns | 56 | 26 | .683 | 7 | 36–5 | 20–21 | 19–11 |
| x-Golden State Warriors | 50 | 32 | .610 | 13 | 29–12 | 21–20 | 19–11 |
| x-Portland Trail Blazers | 47 | 35 | .573 | 16 | 30–11 | 17–24 | 17–13 |
| Los Angeles Lakers | 33 | 49 | .402 | 30 | 21–20 | 12–29 | 7–23 |
| Sacramento Kings | 28 | 54 | .341 | 35 | 20–21 | 8–33 | 9–21 |
| Los Angeles Clippers | 27 | 55 | .329 | 36 | 17–24 | 10–31 | 9–21 |

| # | Western Conference | | | | |
| # | Team | W | L | PCT | GB |
|---|---|---|---|---|---|
| 1 | z-Seattle SuperSonics | 63 | 19 | .768 | – |
| 2 | y-Houston Rockets | 58 | 24 | .707 | 5 |
| 3 | x-Phoenix Suns | 56 | 26 | .683 | 7 |
| 4 | x-San Antonio Spurs | 55 | 27 | .671 | 8 |
| 5 | x-Utah Jazz | 53 | 29 | .646 | 10 |
| 6 | x-Golden State Warriors | 50 | 32 | .610 | 13 |
| 7 | x-Portland Trail Blazers | 47 | 35 | .573 | 16 |
| 8 | x-Denver Nuggets | 42 | 40 | .512 | 21 |
| 9 | Los Angeles Lakers | 33 | 49 | .402 | 30 |
| 10 | Sacramento Kings | 28 | 54 | .341 | 35 |
| 11 | Los Angeles Clippers | 27 | 55 | .329 | 36 |
| 12 | Minnesota Timberwolves | 20 | 62 | .244 | 43 |
| 13 | Dallas Mavericks | 13 | 69 | .159 | 50 |

z - clinched division title
y - clinched division title
x - clinched playoff spot

== Player statistics ==
Legend
| GP | Games played | GS | Games started | MPG | Minutes per game |
| FG% | Field-goal percentage | 3P% | 3-point field-goal percentage | FT% | Free-throw percentage |
| RPG | Rebounds per game | APG | Assists per game | SPG | Steals per game |
| BPG | Blocks per game | PPG | Points per game |

=== Regular season ===
| Player | GP | GS | MPG | FG% | 3P% | FT% | RPG | APG | SPG | BPG | PPG |
|---|---|---|---|---|---|---|---|---|---|---|---|
| Wayman Tisdale | 79 | 77 | 32.4 | .501 | | .808 | 7.1 | 1.8 | .5 | .7 | 16.7 |
| Spud Webb | 79 | 62 | 32.5 | .460 | .335 | .813 | 2.8 | 6.7 | 1.2 | .3 | 12.7 |
| Mitch Richmond | 78 | 78 | 37.1 | .445 | .407 | .834 | 3.7 | 4.0 | 1.3 | .2 | 23.4 |
| Lionel Simmons | 75 | 74 | 36.0 | .438 | .353 | .777 | 7.5 | 4.1 | 1.4 | .7 | 15.1 |
| Randy Brown | 61 | 2 | 17.1 | .438 | .000 | .609 | 1.8 | 2.2 | 1.0 | .2 | 4.5 |
| LaBradford Smith^{†} | 59 | 2 | 14.1 | .403 | .350 | .750 | 1.3 | 1.8 | .6 | .1 | 5.1 |
| Walt Williams | 57 | 4 | 23.8 | .390 | .288 | .635 | 4.1 | 2.3 | .9 | .4 | 11.2 |
| Mike Peplowski | 55 | 19 | 12.1 | .539 | .000 | .545 | 3.1 | .4 | .3 | .5 | 3.2 |
| Trevor Wilson^{†} | 52 | 9 | 21.1 | .481 | .000 | .560 | 4.7 | 1.2 | .6 | .2 | 8.0 |
| Pete Chilcutt^{†} | 46 | 24 | 21.2 | .463 | .000 | .596 | 5.9 | 1.5 | .9 | .6 | 7.3 |
| Duane Causwell | 41 | 8 | 16.4 | .518 | | .588 | 4.5 | .3 | .5 | 1.2 | 4.4 |
| Olden Polynice^{†} | 31 | 29 | 33.9 | .484 | .000 | .556 | 11.4 | .6 | .6 | 1.0 | 9.8 |
| Randy Breuer | 26 | 3 | 9.5 | .308 | .000 | .214 | 2.2 | .3 | .2 | .7 | .7 |
| Andre Spencer^{†} | 23 | 0 | 12.4 | .430 | | .712 | 2.7 | .8 | .8 | .2 | 6.0 |
| Evers Burns | 23 | 0 | 6.2 | .400 | | .522 | 1.3 | .4 | .3 | .1 | 2.4 |
| Bobby Hurley | 19 | 19 | 26.3 | .370 | .125 | .800 | 1.8 | 6.1 | .7 | .1 | 7.1 |
| Jim Les | 18 | 0 | 9.4 | .382 | .444 | .846 | .7 | 2.2 | .4 | .1 | 2.5 |

- ^{†} Denotes player spent time with another team in the season. Stats reflect time with the Kings only.

Player statistics citation:

== Awards and records ==
- Mitch Richmond, All-NBA Second Team

== See also ==
- 1993-94 NBA season
