= 1993–94 Los Angeles Clippers season =

NBA professional basketball team season

- Head coach: Bob Weiss
- Owners: Donald Sterling
- Arena: Los Angeles Sports Arena

Results
- Record: 27–55 (.329)
- Place: Division: 7th (Pacific); Conference: 11th (Western)
- Playoff finish: Did not qualify
- Stats at Basketball Reference

Local media
- Television: KCOP-TV (Ralph Lawler, Bill Walton)
- Radio: KMPC (Rich Marotta)

The 1993–94 Los Angeles Clippers season was the 24th season for the Los Angeles Clippers in the National Basketball Association, and their tenth season in Los Angeles, California.

== Season summary ==
=== Off-season ===
The Clippers had the 13th overall pick in the 1993 NBA draft, and selected shooting guard Terry Dehere out of Seton Hall University. During the off-season, the team signed free agent and former All-Star forward Mark Aguirre, who won two consecutive NBA championships with the Detroit Pistons between 1989 and 1990, and hired Bob Weiss as their new head coach.

=== Regular season ===
Under Weiss, the Clippers played around .500 in winning percentage with a 6–6 start to the regular season. However, after holding an 11–14 record as of December 27, 1993, the team then struggled posting a seven-game losing streak between December and January, as Stanley Roberts only played just 14 games due to a ruptured Achilles tendon, and was out for the remainder of the season. The Clippers lost 10 of their 14 games in January, and held a 16–29 record at the All-Star break. At mid-season, the Clippers traded All-Star forward Danny Manning to the Atlanta Hawks in exchange for All-Star forward Dominique Wilkins; before the trade, Manning averaged 23.7 points, 7.0 rebounds, 4.2 assists, 1.3 steals and 1.4 blocks per game in 42 games.

Meanwhile, Aguirre was released to free agency after 39 games and retired, averaging 10.6 points per game off the team's bench as their sixth man; the team also signed undrafted rookies, power forward Bo Outlaw, and small forward Harold Ellis during the regular season. Despite the addition of Wilkins, the Clippers lost 14 of their final 16 games of the season, and finished in last place in the Pacific Division with a 27–55 record.

Wilkins averaged 29.1 points and 7.0 rebounds per game in 25 games after the trade, and was named to the All-NBA Third Team, while Ron Harper averaged 20.1 points, 6.1 rebounds, 4.6 assists and 1.9 steals per game, and Mark Jackson provided the team with 10.9 points, 8.6 assists and 1.5 steals per game. In addition, Loy Vaught averaged 11.7 points and 8.7 rebounds per game, while second-year center Elmore Spencer contributed 8.9 points, 5.5 rebounds and 1.7 blocks per game, Ellis contributed 8.7 points and 1.5 steals per game, and Gary Grant provided with 7.5 points, 3.7 assists and 1.5 steals per game off the bench.

During the NBA All-Star weekend at the Target Center in Minneapolis, Minnesota, and before the mid-season trade, Manning was selected for the 1994 NBA All-Star Game, as a member of the Western Conference All-Star team; it was his second and final All-Star appearance. Wilkins finished tied in eleventh place in Most Valuable Player voting. The Clippers finished last in the NBA in home-game attendance, with an attendance of 471,034 at the Los Angeles Memorial Sports Arena during the regular season, which was 27th in the league.

=== Aftermath ===
Following the season, Wilkins signed as a free agent with the Boston Celtics after only half a season with the Clippers, while Harper signed with the Chicago Bulls, Jackson was traded to the Indiana Pacers, Weiss was fired as head coach after only one season with the Clippers, and Hot Plate Williams was released to free agency after serving a season half suspension due to continuing weight problems.

== Draft picks ==
Round	Pick	Player	Position	Nationality	College
1	13	Terry Dehere	SG/PG	United States	Seton Hall
2	53	Leonard White	F	United States	Southern

== Roster ==
1993–94 Los Angeles Clippers roster
Players

Pos.	No.	Player	Height	Weight	DOB	From
G	24	Terry Dehere	6 ft 2 in (1.88 m)	190 lb (86 kg)	––	Seton Hall
G/F	30	Harold Ellis	6 ft 5 in (1.96 m)	200 lb (91 kg)	––	Morehouse
G	23	Gary Grant	6 ft 3 in (1.91 m)	185 lb (84 kg)	––	Michigan
G	4	Ron Harper	6 ft 6 in (1.98 m)	216 lb (98 kg)	––	Miami (OH)
G	13	Mark Jackson	6 ft 3 in (1.91 m)	185 lb (84 kg)	––	St. John's
F	32	Henry James	6 ft 8 in (2.03 m)	220 lb (100 kg)	––	St. Mary's (TX)
C	42	Bob Martin	7 ft 0 in (2.13 m)	250 lb (113 kg)	––	Minnesota
F	45	Bo Outlaw	6 ft 8 in (2.03 m)	210 lb (95 kg)	––	Houston
C	53	Stanley Roberts	7 ft 0 in (2.13 m)	285 lb (129 kg)	––	LSU
C	27	Elmore Spencer	7 ft 0 in (2.13 m)	270 lb (122 kg)	––	UNLV
F	3	Tom Tolbert	6 ft 7 in (2.01 m)	240 lb (109 kg)	––	Arizona
F	35	Loy Vaught	6 ft 9 in (2.06 m)	230 lb (104 kg)	––	Michigan
F	21	Dominique Wilkins	6 ft 7 in (2.01 m)	200 lb (91 kg)	––	Georgia
F	34	John Williams (S)	6 ft 8 in (2.03 m)	295 lb (134 kg)	––	LSU
G	14	Randy Woods	5 ft 10 in (1.78 m)	185 lb (84 kg)	––	La Salle

Coaches
Head coach
- Bob Weiss
Assistant(s)
- Johnny Davis
- Bob Ociepka
- Dave Wohl

Legend
- (DP) Unsigned draft pick
- (FA) Free agent
- (S) Suspended
- Injured

Roster
Updated: 2009-10-04

=== Roster notes ===
- Guard/forward Mark Aguirre was waived on February 1, 1994.
- Power forward John "Hot Plate" Williams was suspended indefinitely before the start of the regular season due to weight problems, and not maintaining playing shape.

== Regular season ==
=== Season standings ===
Pacific Division	W	L	PCT	GB	Home	Road	Div
y-Seattle SuperSonics	63	19	.768	—	37–4	26–15	25–5
x-Phoenix Suns	56	26	.683	7	36–5	20–21	19–11
x-Golden State Warriors	50	32	.610	13	29–12	21–20	19–11
x-Portland Trail Blazers	47	35	.573	16	30–11	17–24	17–13
Los Angeles Lakers	33	49	.402	30	21–20	12–29	7–23
Sacramento Kings	28	54	.341	35	20–21	8–33	9–21
Los Angeles Clippers	27	55	.329	36	17–24	10–31	9–21

#	Western Conference				
#	Team	W	L	PCT	GB
1	z-Seattle SuperSonics	63	19	.768	–
2	y-Houston Rockets	58	24	.707	5
3	x-Phoenix Suns	56	26	.683	7
4	x-San Antonio Spurs	55	27	.671	8
5	x-Utah Jazz	53	29	.646	10
6	x-Golden State Warriors	50	32	.610	13
7	x-Portland Trail Blazers	47	35	.573	16
8	x-Denver Nuggets	42	40	.512	21
9	Los Angeles Lakers	33	49	.402	30
10	Sacramento Kings	28	54	.341	35
11	Los Angeles Clippers	27	55	.329	36
12	Minnesota Timberwolves	20	62	.244	43
13	Dallas Mavericks	13	69	.159	50

z - clinched division title
y - clinched division title
x - clinched playoff spot

== Player statistics ==
Legend
GP	Games played	GS	Games started	MPG	Minutes per game
FG%	Field-goal percentage	3P%	3-point field-goal percentage	FT%	Free-throw percentage
RPG	Rebounds per game	APG	Assists per game	SPG	Steals per game
BPG	Blocks per game	PPG	Points per game

Player	GP	GS	MPG	FG%	3P%	FT%	RPG	APG	SPG	BPG	PPG
Dominique Wilkins	25	25	37.9	45.3	24.7	83.5	7.0	2.2	1.2	0.3	29.1
Danny Manning	42	41	38.0	49.3	14.3	67.4	7.0	4.2	1.3	1.4	23.7
Ron Harper	75	75	38.1	42.6	30.1	71.5	6.1	4.6	1.9	0.7	20.1
Loy Vaught	75	56	28.2	53.7	0.0	72.0	8.7	1.0	1.0	0.3	11.7
Mark Jackson	79	79	34.3	45.2	28.3	79.1	4.4	8.6	1.5	0.1	10.9
Mark Aguirre	39	0	22.0	46.8	39.8	69.4	3.0	2.7	0.5	0.2	10.6
Elmore Spencer	76	63	25.4	53.3	0.0	59.9	5.5	1.0	0.4	1.7	8.9
Harold Ellis	49	16	18.8	54.5	0.0	71.1	3.1	0.6	1.5	0.0	8.7
Gary Grant	78	8	19.7	44.9	27.4	85.5	1.8	3.7	1.5	0.2	7.5
Stanley Roberts	14	14	25.0	43.0	0.0	40.9	6.6	0.8	0.4	1.8	7.4
Bo Outlaw	37	14	23.5	58.7	0.0	59.2	5.7	1.0	1.0	1.0	6.9
John Williams	34	6	21.3	43.1	25.0	66.7	3.7	2.9	0.7	0.3	5.6
Terry Dehere	64	6	11.9	37.7	40.4	75.3	1.1	1.2	0.4	0.0	5.3
Tom Tolbert	49	6	13.1	41.8	37.5	73.3	2.2	0.6	0.3	0.3	3.8
Randy Woods	40	0	8.8	36.8	34.6	57.1	0.7	1.8	0.6	0.1	3.6
Henry James	12	0	6.3	38.1	22.2	100.0	1.2	0.1	0.2	0.0	3.4
Bob Martin	53	1	10.1	45.5	0.0	60.8	2.2	0.3	0.2	0.6	2.1

Player statistics citation:

== Awards, records and milestones ==
=== All-Star ===
Danny Manning selected as a reserve forward for the Western Conference All-Stars. This is his second straight All-Game appearance making Manning the first back-to-back All-Star selection of the franchise since Bob McAdoo then with the Buffalo Braves was selected for four straight All-Star Games from 1974 to 1977.

== Transactions ==
The Clippers were involved in the following transactions during the 1993–94 season.

=== Trades ===
February 24, 1994
To Los Angeles Clippers

- Dominique Wilkins
To Atlanta Hawks

- Danny Manning

=== Free agents ===
==== Additions ====
Player	Signed	Former team
Henry James	July 19	Utah Jazz
Tom Tolbert	October 1	Orlando Magic
Bob Martin	November 1	Rapid City Thrillers (CBA)
Harold Ellis	January 7	Quad City Thunder (CBA)
Bo Outlaw	February 15	Grand Rapids Hoops (CBA)

==== Subtractions ====
Player	Left	New team
Lester Conner	free agency, July 1	Rapid City Thrillers (CBA)
Ken Norman	free agency, July 7	Milwaukee Bucks
Jaren Jackson	free agency, December 21	Portland Trail Blazers
Henry James	waived, January 5	Sioux Falls Skyforce (CBA)
Mark Aguirre	waived, February 1	Indiana Pacers (assistant coach)

Player Transactions Citation:

== See also ==
- Los Angeles Clippers
- Los Angeles Memorial Sports Arena
