= 1993–94 Minnesota Timberwolves season =

NBA professional basketball team season

- Head coach: Sidney Lowe
- Arena: Target Center

Results
- Record: 20–62 (.244)
- Place: Division: 5th (Midwest); Conference: 12th (Western)
- Playoff finish: Did not qualify
- Stats at Basketball Reference

Local media
- Television: KARE; KITN-TV; Prime Sports Upper Midwest
- Radio: KFAN

The 1993–94 Minnesota Timberwolves season was the fifth season for the Minnesota Timberwolves in the National Basketball Association. The city of Minneapolis, Minnesota hosted the NBA All-Star weekend at the Target Center this season, which featured the 1994 NBA All-Star Game.

== Season summary ==
=== Off-season ===
The Timberwolves received the fifth overall pick in the 1993 NBA draft, and selected shooting guard Isaiah Rider from the University of Nevada, Las Vegas. During the off-season, the team acquired Mike Brown from the Utah Jazz.

=== Regular season ===
Despite the addition of Rider and Brown, the Timberwolves continued to struggle losing their first five games of the regular season, then posted two seven-game losing streaks in December and February, holding a 14–32 record at the All-Star break. At mid-season, the team traded Luc Longley to the Chicago Bulls in exchange for Stacey King. The Timberwolves posted an eight-game losing streak in March, and lost their final ten games of the season, finishing in fifth place in the Midwest Division with a 20–62 record; the team missed the NBA playoffs for the fifth consecutive year.

Second-year star Christian Laettner averaged 16.8 points, 8.6 rebounds, 4.4 assists and 1.2 blocks per game, while Rider finished second on the team in scoring with 16.6 points per game, and was named to the NBA All-Rookie First Team, and Doug West provided the team with 14.7 points per game. In addition, Michael Williams contributed 13.7 points, 7.2 assists and 1.7 steals per game, while King averaged 11.8 points, 6.1 rebounds and 1.7 blocks per game in 18 games after the trade, and Chuck Person provided with 11.6 points per game, and led the Timberwolves with 100 three-point field goals. Meanwhile, Thurl Bailey contributed 7.4 points per game, second-year guard Chris Smith provided with 5.9 points and 3.5 assists per game, and Brown averaged 3.6 points and 5.5 rebounds per game.

During the NBA All-Star weekend at the Target Center in Minneapolis, Rider won the NBA Slam Dunk Contest, and was also selected for the inaugural NBA Rookie Game, as a member of the Phenoms team. The Timberwolves finished ninth in the NBA in home-game attendance, with an attendance of 733,419 at the Target Center during the regular season.

=== Aftermath ===
Following the season, Person signed as a free agent with the San Antonio Spurs, while Bailey retired, and head coach Sidney Lowe was fired. Meanwhile, the Timberwolves were nearly sold to a group of investors that would have moved the team to New Orleans, Louisiana, despite the stellar attendance at the Target Center. However, the NBA Board of Governors vetoed the sale, and new owner Glen Taylor promised to keep the team in Minneapolis.

== Draft picks ==
Round	Pick	Player	Position	Nationality	College
1	5	Isaiah Rider	SG	United States	Nevada-Las Vegas
2	29	Sherron Mills	F	United States	Virginia Commonwealth

== Roster ==
1993–94 Minnesota Timberwolves roster
Players

Pos.	No.	Player	Height	Weight	DOB	From
F	41	Thurl Bailey	6 ft 11 in (2.11 m)	215 lb (98 kg)	––	NC State
C	40	Mike Brown	6 ft 9 in (2.06 m)	257 lb (117 kg)	––	George Washington
F	23	Brian Davis	6 ft 7 in (2.01 m)	200 lb (91 kg)	––	Duke
F	32	Tellis Frank	6 ft 10 in (2.08 m)	225 lb (102 kg)	––	Western Kentucky
C	51	Andrés Guibert	6 ft 10 in (2.08 m)	225 lb (102 kg)	––	Cuba
G	7	Stanley Jackson	6 ft 3 in (1.91 m)	185 lb (84 kg)	––	UAB
C	21	Stacey King	6 ft 11 in (2.11 m)	230 lb (104 kg)	––	Oklahoma
F	32	Christian Laettner	6 ft 11 in (2.11 m)	235 lb (107 kg)	––	Duke
F	25	Marlon Maxey	6 ft 8 in (2.03 m)	250 lb (113 kg)	––	UTEP
F	45	Chuck Person	6 ft 8 in (2.03 m)	220 lb (100 kg)	––	Auburn
G	34	Isaiah Rider	6 ft 5 in (1.96 m)	215 lb (98 kg)	––	UNLV
G	3	Chris Smith	6 ft 3 in (1.91 m)	190 lb (86 kg)	––	Connecticut
F	5	Doug West	6 ft 6 in (1.98 m)	200 lb (91 kg)	––	Villanova
G	4	Micheal Williams	6 ft 2 in (1.88 m)	175 lb (79 kg)	––	Baylor

Coaches
Head coach
- Sidney Lowe
Assistant(s)
- Jim Brewer
- Chuck Davisson
- Bob Weinhauer

Legend
- (DP) Unsigned draft pick
- (FA) Free agent
- (S) Suspended
- Injured

Roster

== Regular season ==
=== Season standings ===
Midwest Division	W	L	PCT	GB	Home	Road	Div
y-Houston Rockets	58	24	.707	—	35–6	23–18	15–11
x-San Antonio Spurs	55	27	.671	3	32–9	23–18	16–10
x-Utah Jazz	53	29	.646	5	33–8	20–21	21–5
x-Denver Nuggets	42	40	.512	16	28–13	14–27	14–12
Minnesota Timberwolves	20	62	.244	38	13–28	7–34	5–21
Dallas Mavericks	13	69	.159	45	6–35	7–34	7–19

#	Western Conference				
#	Team	W	L	PCT	GB
1	z-Seattle SuperSonics	63	19	.768	–
2	y-Houston Rockets	58	24	.707	5
3	x-Phoenix Suns	56	26	.683	7
4	x-San Antonio Spurs	55	27	.671	8
5	x-Utah Jazz	53	29	.646	10
6	x-Golden State Warriors	50	32	.610	13
7	x-Portland Trail Blazers	47	35	.573	16
8	x-Denver Nuggets	42	40	.512	21
9	Los Angeles Lakers	33	49	.402	30
10	Sacramento Kings	28	54	.341	35
11	Los Angeles Clippers	27	55	.329	36
12	Minnesota Timberwolves	20	62	.244	43
13	Dallas Mavericks	13	69	.159	50

== Player statistics ==
=== Ragular season ===
Player	POS	GP	GS	MP	REB	AST	STL	BLK	PTS	MPG	RPG	APG	SPG	BPG	PPG
Mike Brown	C	82	40	1,921	447	72	51	29	299	23.4	5.5	.9	.6	.4	3.6
Chris Smith	PG	80	16	1,617	122	285	38	18	473	20.2	1.5	3.6	.5	.2	5.9
Isaiah Rider	SG	79	60	2,415	315	202	54	28	1,313	30.6	4.0	2.6	.7	.4	16.6
Thurl Bailey	PF	79	3	1,297	215	54	20	58	583	16.4	2.7	.7	.3	.7	7.4
Chuck Person	SF	77	37	2,029	253	185	45	12	894	26.4	3.3	2.4	.6	.2	11.6
Doug West	SG	72	61	2,182	231	172	65	24	1,056	30.3	3.2	2.4	.9	.3	14.7
Micheal Williams	PG	71	66	2,206	221	512	118	24	971	31.1	3.1	7.2	1.7	.3	13.7
Christian Laettner	PF	70	67	2,428	602	307	87	86	1,173	34.7	8.6	4.4	1.2	1.2	16.8
Brian Davis	SF	68	3	374	55	22	16	4	131	5.5	.8	.3	.2	.1	1.9
Tellis Frank	PF	67	11	959	220	57	35	35	188	14.3	3.3	.9	.5	.5	2.8
Marlon Maxey	PF	55	2	626	199	10	16	33	248	11.4	3.6	.2	.3	.6	4.5
Luc Longley^{†}	C	49	29	989	295	46	35	58	324	20.2	6.0	.9	.7	1.2	6.6
Stacey King^{†}	C	18	15	516	109	19	13	30	213	28.7	6.1	1.1	.7	1.7	11.8
Stanley Jackson	SG	17	0	92	27	16	5	0	38	5.4	1.6	.9	.3	.0	2.2
Andrés Guibert	C	5	0	33	16	2	0	1	15	6.6	3.2	.4	.0	.2	3.0
Corey Williams	PG	4	0	46	6	6	2	0	11	11.5	1.5	1.5	.5	.0	2.8

- ^{†} Denotes player spent time with another team in the season. Stats reflect time with the Timberwolves only.

== Awards and records ==
- Isaiah Rider, NBA All-Rookie Team 1st Team

== Transactions ==
=== Additions ===
Player	Signed	Former team
Brian Davis		Élan Béarnais Pau-Orthez
