= 1993–94 Houston Rockets season =

- NBA champions
- Conference champions
- Division champions
- Head coach: Rudy Tomjanovich
- General manager: Tod Leiweke (August 1993 – January 1994); Bob Weinhauer
- Owner: Leslie Alexander
- Arena: The Summit

Results
- Record: 58–24 (.707)
- Place: Division: 1st (Midwest); Conference: 2nd (Western)
- Playoff finish: NBA champions (Defeated Knicks 4–3)
- Stats at Basketball Reference

Local media
- Television: KTXH; Home Sports Entertainment (Bill Worrell, Calvin Murphy)
- Radio: KTRH (Gene Peterson, Jim Foley)

The 1993–94 Houston Rockets season was the 27th season for the franchise in the National Basketball Association, and their 23rd season in Houston, Texas.

== Season summary ==
=== Off-season ===
The Rockets had the 24th overall pick in the 1993 NBA draft, and selected point guard Sam Cassell out of Florida State University. During the off-season, the team acquired Mario Elie from the Portland Trail Blazers.

=== Regular season ===
With the addition of Elie and Cassell, the Rockets got off to a great start, winning their first fifteen games of the regular season to tie the 1948–49 Washington Capitols for the best unbeaten record to open a season, while also posting a 14–0 record in November. The Golden State Warriors surpassed the record in 2015, and the Cleveland Cavaliers tied the Rockets' mark in 2024. After losing their first regular season game to the Atlanta Hawks on the road, 133–111 at the Omni Coliseum on December 3, 1993, the Rockets posted a seven-game winning streak, falling just one victory short of tying the 1969–70 New York Knicks, (23–1) for the best record with one defeat in NBA history. However, the Rockets slowed down as the season progressed, at one point losing four straight games in January, and later on holding a 34–12 record at the All-Star break. The Rockets finished in first place in the Midwest Division with a 58–24 record, a franchise record that stood until the 2017-18 team recorded their 59th win; the team earned the second seed in the Western Conference.

Hakeem Olajuwon averaged 27.3 points, 11.9 rebounds, 3.6 assists, 1.6 steals and 3.7 blocks per game, and was named the NBA Most Valuable Player of the Year, ahead of David Robinson of the San Antonio Spurs, and Scottie Pippen of the Chicago Bulls; Olajuwon was also named the NBA Defensive Player of the Year for the second consecutive year, also beating out Robinson by a narrow 23 to 22 votes. He was also named to the All-NBA First Team, and to the NBA All-Defensive First Team. In addition, Otis Thorpe averaged 14.0 points and 10.6 rebounds per game, while Vernon Maxwell provided the team with 13.6 points, 5.1 assists and 1.6 steals per game, and also led them with 120 three-point field goals, despite shooting .298 in three-point percentage, Kenny Smith contributed 11.6 points and 4.2 assists per game, and second-year forward Robert Horry provided with 9.9 points, 5.4 rebounds and 1.5 steals per game. Off the bench, Elie played a sixth man role averaging 9.3 points per game, while Cassell provided with 6.7 points and 2.9 assists per game, Scott Brooks contributed 5.2 points per game, and Carl Herrera averaged 4.7 points and 3.8 rebounds per game.

During the NBA All-Star weekend at the Target Center in Minneapolis, Minnesota, Olajuwon was selected for the 1994 NBA All-Star Game, as a member of the Western Conference All-Star team, while Cassell was selected for the inaugural NBA Rookie Game, as a member of the Phenoms team. Elie finished tied in sixth place in Sixth Man of the Year voting, while head coach Rudy Tomjanovich finished in fourth place in Coach of the Year voting.

The Rockets finished 18th in the NBA in home-game attendance, with an attendance of 615,227 at The Summit during the regular season.

=== NBA playoffs ===
In the Western Conference First Round of the 1994 NBA playoffs, the Rockets faced off against the 7th–seeded Portland Trail Blazers, a team that featured All-Star guard Clyde Drexler, All-Star forward Clifford Robinson, and Rod Strickland. The Rockets won the first two games over the Trail Blazers at home at The Summit, before losing Game 3 on the road, 118–115 at the Memorial Coliseum. The Rockets won Game 4 over the Trail Blazers on the road, 92–89 to win the series in four games.

In the Western Conference Semi-finals, the team faced off against the 3rd–seeded Phoenix Suns, who were led by the All-Star trio of Charles Barkley, Kevin Johnson, and three-point specialist Dan Majerle. The Rockets lost their first two home games to the Suns at The Summit; in Game 2, the Rockets were up by 20 points with ten minutes left in the fourth quarter, but the Suns went on a 24–4 run, and defeated the Rockets in overtime, 124–117 to take a 2–0 series lead. The Rockets managed to win the next two games on the road at the America West Arena to even the series, before winning Game 5 at home by a score of 109–86, but then lost Game 6 to the Suns on the road, 103–89. With the series tied at 3–3, the Rockets won Game 7 over the Suns at The Summit, 104–94 to win in a hard-fought seven-game series.

In the Western Conference Finals, the Rockets then faced off against the 5th–seeded Utah Jazz, who were led by the trio of All-Star forward Karl Malone, All-Star guard John Stockton, and Jeff Hornacek. The Rockets won the first two games over the Jazz at The Summit, before losing Game 3 on the road, 95–86 at the Delta Center. The Rockets won the next two games, including a Game 5 win over the Jazz at The Summit, 94–83 to win the series in five games, and advance to the NBA Finals.

In the 1994 NBA Finals, the Rockets faced off against the 2nd–seeded New York Knicks, who were led by the All-Star trio of Patrick Ewing, John Starks and Charles Oakley. The Rockets took a 2–1 series lead, but the Knicks managed to win the next two games at Madison Square Garden, defeating the Rockets in Game 5, 91–84 to take a 3–2 series lead. However, the Rockets won the next two games at The Summit, including a Game 7 home win over the Knicks, 90–84, thus winning in a hard-fought seven-game series, and winning their first ever NBA championship in franchise history; Olajuwon was named the NBA Finals Most Valuable Player.

This was the Rockets' third NBA Finals appearance, after 1981 and 1986; Olajuwon was the only player from the 1985–86 Rockets team to still be on the 1993–94 team. By winning the Finals MVP award, Olajuwon also became the first player ever to win regular season MVP, Defensive Player of the Year, and Finals MVP in the same season. The Rockets also became the first team from the Midwest Division since the Milwaukee Bucks, 23 years prior to win an NBA title.

== Draft ==
Round	Pick	Player	Position	Nationality	College / Club
1	24	Sam Cassell	Guard	United States	Florida State
2	46	Richard Petruška	Center	United States	UCLA
2	50	Marcelo Nicola	Forward	Argentina	Taugres (Spain)

== Roster ==
1993–94 Houston Rockets roster
Players

Pos.	No.	Player	Height	Weight	DOB	From
G	1	Scott Brooks	5 ft 11 in (1.80 m)	165 lb (75 kg)	1965–07–31	UC Irvine
F	50	Matt Bullard	6 ft 10 in (2.08 m)	215 lb (98 kg)	1967–06–05	Iowa
G	10	Sam Cassell	6 ft 3 in (1.91 m)	185 lb (84 kg)	1969–11–18	Florida State
F	35	Earl Cureton	6 ft 9 in (2.06 m)	210 lb (95 kg)	1957–09–03	Detroit Mercy
G	17	Mario Elie	6 ft 5 in (1.96 m)	210 lb (95 kg)	1963–11–26	American International
F	7	Carl Herrera	6 ft 9 in (2.06 m)	215 lb (98 kg)	1966–12–14	Houston
F	25	Robert Horry	6 ft 9 in (2.06 m)	220 lb (100 kg)	1970–08–25	Alabama
F	21	Chris Jent	6 ft 7 in (2.01 m)	220 lb (100 kg)	1970–01–11	Ohio State
F	11	Vernon Maxwell	6 ft 4 in (1.93 m)	180 lb (82 kg)	1965–09–12	Florida
C	34	Hakeem Olajuwon	7 ft 0 in (2.13 m)	255 lb (116 kg)	1963–01–21	Houston
C	3	Richard Petruska	6 ft 10 in (2.08 m)	260 lb (118 kg)	1969–01–25	UCLA
C	42	Eric Riley	7 ft 0 in (2.13 m)	245 lb (111 kg)	1970–06–02	Michigan
G	20	Larry Robinson	6 ft 3 in (1.91 m)	190 lb (86 kg)	1968–01–11	Centenary
G	30	Kenny Smith	6 ft 3 in (1.91 m)	170 lb (77 kg)	1965–03–08	North Carolina
F	33	Otis Thorpe	6 ft 10 in (2.08 m)	225 lb (102 kg)	1962–08–05	Providence

Coaches
Head coach
- Rudy Tomjanovich
Assistant(s)
- Bill Berry
- Jim Boylen
- Carroll Dawson

Legend
- (DP) Unsigned draft pick
- (FA) Free agent
- (S) Suspended
- Injured

Roster
Updated: April 21, 1994

== Regular season ==
=== Season standings ===
Midwest Division	W	L	PCT	GB	Home	Road	Div
y-Houston Rockets	58	24	.707	—	35–6	23–18	15–11
x-San Antonio Spurs	55	27	.671	3	32–9	23–18	16–10
x-Utah Jazz	53	29	.646	5	33–8	20–21	21–5
x-Denver Nuggets	42	40	.512	16	28–13	14–27	14–12
Minnesota Timberwolves	20	62	.244	38	13–28	7–34	5–21
Dallas Mavericks	13	69	.159	45	6–35	7–34	7–19

#	Western Conference				
#	Team	W	L	PCT	GB
1	z-Seattle SuperSonics	63	19	.768	–
2	y-Houston Rockets	58	24	.707	5
3	x-Phoenix Suns	56	26	.683	7
4	x-San Antonio Spurs	55	27	.671	8
5	x-Utah Jazz	53	29	.646	10
6	x-Golden State Warriors	50	32	.610	13
7	x-Portland Trail Blazers	47	35	.573	16
8	x-Denver Nuggets	42	40	.512	21
9	Los Angeles Lakers	33	49	.402	30
10	Sacramento Kings	28	54	.341	35
11	Los Angeles Clippers	27	55	.329	36
12	Minnesota Timberwolves	20	62	.244	43
13	Dallas Mavericks	13	69	.159	50

== Game log ==
=== Regular season ===
1993–94 game log
Total: 58–24 (Home: 35–6; Road: 23–18)
November: 14–0 (home: 6–0; road: 8–0)

Game	Date	Team	Score	High points	High rebounds	High assists	Location Attendance	Record
1	November 5; 7:30 p.m. CST	New Jersey	W 110–88	Olajuwon (24)	Olajuwon (19)	Maxwell (8)	The Summit; 11,128	1–0
2	November 7; 9:30 p.m. CST	@ Portland	W 106–92	Olajuwon (29)	Olajuwon (12)	Olajuwon (7)	Memorial Coliseum; 12,888	2–0
3	November 9; 9:30 p.m. CST	@ Golden State	W 102–93	Olajuwon (32)	Thorpe (13)	Maxwell (8)	Oakland–Alameda County Coliseum Arena; 15,025	3–0
4	November 11; 7:30 p.m. CST	Minnesota	W 107–99	Olajuwon (36)	Olajuwon (17)	Smith (9)	The Summit; 10,238	4–0
5	November 13; 7:30 p.m. CST	Phoenix	W 99–95	Maxwell; Olajuwon (24)	Olajuwon (16)	Olajuwon; Smith; Thorpe (4)	The Summit; 16,611	5–0
6	November 15; 6:30 p.m. CST	@ Philadelphia	W 88–84	Olajuwon (21)	Thorpe (19)	Smith (6)	Spectrum; 9,282	6–0
7	November 16; 6:30 p.m. CST	@ New Jersey	W 90–84	Olajuwon (20)	Olajuwon (19)	Maxwell; Olajuwon (3)	Brendan Byrne Arena; 9,110	7–0
8	November 18; 6:30 p.m. CST	@ Indiana	W 99–83	Thorpe (24)	Thorpe (11)	Maxwell (7)	Market Square Arena; 9,276	8–0
9	November 20; 7:30 p.m. CST	L.A. Clippers	W 108–86	Olajuwon (22)	Olajuwon (12)	Brooks (6)	The Summit; 15,678	9–0
10	November 23; 7:30 p.m. CST	Chicago	W 100–93	Olajuwon (28)	Olajuwon (11)	Maxwell (10)	The Summit; 16,611	10–0
11	November 24; 8:00 p.m. CST	@ Utah	W 95–93 (OT)	Olajuwon (29)	Olajuwon (17)	Maxwell (7)	Delta Center; 19,911	11–0
12	November 26; 9:30 p.m. CST	@ Sacramento	W 92–89	Olajuwon (36)	Thorpe (14)	Horry; Thorpe (4)	ARCO Arena; 17,317	12–0
13	November 27; 9:30 p.m. CST	@ L.A. Clippers	W 82–80	Maxwell (17)	Olajuwon (15)	Maxwell (4)	Los Angeles Memorial Sports Arena; 13,807	13–0
14	November 30; 7:30 p.m. CST	Milwaukee	W 102–91	Olajuwon (20)	Olajuwon (12)	Olajuwon (6)	The Summit; 14,186	14–0

December: 10–4 (home: 4–1; road: 6–3)

Game	Date	Team	Score	High points	High rebounds	High assists	Location Attendance	Record
15	December 2; 6:30 p.m. CST	@ New York	W 94–85	Olajuwon (37)	Herrera (15)	Horry (8)	Madison Square Garden; 19,763	15–0
16	December 3; 6:30 p.m. CST	@ Atlanta	L 111–133	Maxwell (26)	Olajuwon (7)	Horry (5)	The Omni; 16,368	15–1
17	December 5; 6:00 p.m. CST	@ Cleveland	W 99–98	Olajuwon (22)	Olajuwon (9)	Maxwell (6)	Richfield Coliseum; 17,393	16–1
18	December 7; 7:30 p.m. CST	Charlotte	W 121–102	Thorpe (40)	Olajuwon; Thorpe (7)	Maxwell (7)	The Summit; 16,611	17–1
19	December 9; 7:30 p.m. CST	Miami	W 115–109 (OT)	Olajuwon (28)	Olajuwon (16)	Elie (5)	The Summit; 12,707	18–1
20	December 11; 7:30 p.m. CST	Seattle	W 82–75	Olajuwon (23)	Thorpe (14)	Elie (6)	The Summit; 16,611	19–1
21	December 14; 6:30 p.m. CST	@ Miami	W 97–88	Maxwell (25)	Olajuwon (11)	Maxwell (6)	Miami Arena; 15,011	20–1
22	December 18; 7:30 p.m. CST	Dallas	W 104–93	Olajuwon (28)	Thorpe (15)	Smith (6)	The Summit; 15,798	21–1
23	December 21; 7:30 p.m. CST	@ San Antonio	W 90–88	Maxwell (35)	Olajuwon (10)	Maxwell; Olajuwon (6)	Alamodome; 32,631	22–1
24	December 23; 7:30 p.m. CST	Denver	L 93–106	Olajuwon (35)	Olajuwon (17)	Maxwell (7)	The Summit; 16,611	22–2
25	December 25; 1:30 p.m. CST	@ Phoenix	L 91–111	Olajuwon (27)	Olajuwon (13)	Horry (8)	America West Arena; 19,023	22–3
26	December 26; 9:00 p.m. CST	@ L.A. Lakers	W 118–93	Smith (41)	Olajuwon (14)	Maxwell; Smith (6)	Great Western Forum; 15,393	23–3
27	December 28; 9:00 p.m. CST	@ Seattle	L 97–112	Olajuwon (34)	Thorpe (12)	Smith (7)	Seattle Center Coliseum; 14,813	23–4
28	December 30; 7:00 p.m. CST	@ Minnesota	W 110–104	Olajuwon (34)	Thorpe (17)	Maxwell (7)	Target Center; 18,461	24–4

January: 7–6 (home: 5–2; road: 2–4)

Game	Date	Team	Score	High points	High rebounds	High assists	Location Attendance	Record
29	January 4; 7:30 p.m. CST	Portland	W 106–95	Olajuwon (33)	Thorpe (13)	Maxwell (11)	The Summit; 16,611	25–4
30	January 5; 7:30 p.m. CST	@ Dallas	W 114–102	Olajuwon (37)	Olajuwon (14)	Olajuwon (8)	Reunion Arena; 11,721	26–4
31	January 8; 7:30 p.m. CST	Philadelphia	W 100–93	Olajuwon (23)	Olajuwon (17)	Cassell (9)	The Summit; 16,611	27–4
32	January 10; 7:00 p.m. CST	@ Orlando	L 100–115	Olajuwon (26)	Olajuwon (11)	Smith (8)	Orlando Arena; 15,291	27–5
33	January 12; 6:30 p.m. CST	@ Boston	W 94–84	Olajuwon (37)	Thorpe (13)	Smith (7)	Boston Garden; 14,890	28–5
34	January 13; 6:30 p.m. CST	@ Washington	L 102–120	Olajuwon (45)	Thorpe (11)	Elie (5)	USAir Arena; 16.024	28–6
35	January 15; 7:30 p.m. CST	@ Chicago	L 76–82	Olajuwon (29)	Olajuwon; Thorpe (10)	Maxwell (5)	Chicago Stadium; 18,676	28–7
36	January 18; 7:30 p.m. CST	Boston	L 83–95	Olajuwon (28)	Thorpe (14)	Maxwell (8)	The Summit; 16,611	28–8
37	January 20; 8:00 p.m. CST	@ Denver	L 106–111 (2OT)	Thorpe (24)	Thorpe (20)	Elie (6)	McNichols Sports Arena; 17,171	28–9
38	January 22; 7:30 p.m. CST	Utah	W 106–101	Olajuwon (40)	Thorpe (11)	Maxwell (7)	The Summit; 16,611	29–9
39	January 25; 7:30 p.m. CST	Cleveland	W 96–93	Maxwell (21)	Olajuwon (10)	Maxwell (10)	The Summit; 13,006	30–9
40	January 27; 7:30 p.m. CST	Sacramento	W 113–97	Olajuwon (24)	Thorpe (14)	Maxwell (8)	The Summit; 11,467	31–9
41	January 29; 7:30 p.m. CST	Indiana	L 108–119	Olajuwon (27)	Olajuwon (12)	Cassell (6)	The Summit; 16,611	31–10

February: 7–5 (home: 6–1; road: 1–4)

Game	Date	Team	Score	High points	High rebounds	High assists	Location Attendance	Record
42	February 1; 8:00 p.m. CST	@ Utah	L 88–104	Olajuwon (23)	Herrera; Olajuwon (7)	Maxwell (6)	Delta Center; 19,911	31–11
43	February 3; 7:30 p.m. CST	L.A. Lakers	W 99–88	Olajuwon (28)	Olajuwon (15)	Maxwell (5)	The Summit; 12,092	32–11
44	February 6; 5:00 p.m. CST	Minnesota	W 110–104	Olajuwon (25)	Olajuwon; Thorpe (17)	Elie (7)	The Summit; 13,805	33–11
45	February 8; 7:30 p.m. CST	@ Milwaukee	L 98–106	Olajuwon (27)	Olajuwon (12)	Brooks (6)	Bradley Center; 15,189	33–12
46	February 10; 6:30 p.m. CST	@ Detroit	W 104–81	Olajuwon (28)	Olajuwon (20)	Maxwell (6)	The Palace of Auburn Hills; 17,135	34–12
All-Star Break
47	February 15; 7:30 p.m. CST	Atlanta	W 103–99	Olajuwon (28)	Olajuwon (14)	Smith (10)	The Summit; 15,204	35–12
48	February 16; 6:30 p.m. CST	@ Charlotte	L 97–102	Olajuwon (30)	Olajuwon (12)	Maxwell (6)	Charlotte Coliseum; 23,698	35–13
49	February 19; 7:30 p.m. CST	Phoenix	W 106–88	Maxwell (25)	Thorpe (18)	Horry (5)	The Summit; 16,611	36–13
50	February 22; 7:30 p.m. CST	Denver	W 98–97	Olajuwon (33)	Olajuwon (13)	Maxwell (8)	The Summit; 12,043	37–13
51	February 24; 7:00 p.m. CST	New York	W 93–73	Olajuwon (29)	Olajuwon (20)	Maxwell (6)	The Summit; 16,611	38–13
52	February 26; 7:30 p.m. CST	Utah	L 85–95	Olajuwon (23)	Olajuwon; Thorpe (9)	Maxwell; Smith (5)	The Summit; 16,611	38–14
53	February 28; 8:00 p.m. CST	@ Utah	L 85–89	Olajuwon (20)	Thorpe (11)	Cassell (4)	Delta Center; 19,911	38–15

March: 12–4 (home: 9–1; road: 3–3)

Game	Date	Team	Score	High points	High rebounds	High assists	Location Attendance	Record
54	March 1; 7:30 p.m. CST	Orlando	W 97–85	Olajuwon (26)	Thorpe (19)	Maxwell (6)	The Summit; 16,611	39–15
55	March 5; 7:30 p.m. CST	L.A. Clippers	W 124–107	Olajuwon (30)	Olajuwon (12)	Maxwell (9)	The Summit; 15,009	40–15
56	March 8; 7:30 p.m. CST	@ San Antonio	L 99–115	Olajuwon (28)	Olajuwon (11)	Maxwell (6)	Alamodome; 20,539	40–16
57	March 10; 7:00 p.m. CST	Seattle	W 87–82	Olajuwon (23)	Olajuwon (8)	Maxwell (6)	The Summit; 16,611	41–16
58	March 12; 7:30 p.m. CST	San Antonio	L 98–109	Olajuwon (27)	Olajuwon (18)	Maxwell (7)	The Summit; 16,611	41–17
59	March 13; 7:00 p.m. CST	@ Dallas	W 100–93	Maxwell (27)	Thorpe (15)	Maxwell (8)	Reunion Arena; 12,525	42–17
60	March 15; 7:30 p.m. CST	Portland	W 105–99	Olajuwon (41)	Thorpe (16)	Horry; Olajuwon (6)	The Summit; 15,930	43–17
61	March 17; 7:30 p.m. CST	Golden State	W 112–99	Maxwell (25)	Thorpe (21)	Maxwell (8)	The Summit; 14,707	44–17
62	March 19; 7:30 p.m. CST	Detroit	W 106–88	Olajuwon (32)	Elie (15)	Smith (5)	The Summit; 15,512	45–17
63	March 21; 7:30 p.m. CST	Washington	W 128–112	Olajuwon (35)	Olajuwon (14)	Elie; Smith (6)	The Summit; 11,247	46–17
64	March 22; 7:00 p.m. CST	@ Minnesota	L 81–83	Olajuwon (25)	Thorpe (10)	Elie; Smith (6)	Target Center; 17,178	46–18
65	March 24; 7:30 p.m. CST	L.A. Lakers	W 113–107	Olajuwon (37)	Thorpe (14)	Smith (10)	The Summit; 14,688	47–18
66	March 26; 7:30 p.m. CST	Utah	W 98–83	Olajuwon (37)	Olajuwon (19)	Cassell (8)	The Summit; 16,611	48–18
67	March 27; 7:00 p.m. CST	@ Phoenix	L 98–113	Olajuwon (21)	Olajuwon (11)	Thorpe (8)	America West Arena; 19,023	48–19
68	March 29; 9:30 p.m. CST	@ Sacramento	W 122–101	Thorpe (21)	Thorpe (18)	Cassell (8)	ARCO Arena; 17,317	49–19
69	March 30; 9:30 p.m. CST	@ Golden State	W 114–104	Maxwell (28)	Thorpe (21)	Horry; Smith (8)	Oakland–Alameda County Coliseum Arena; 15,025	50–19

April: 8–5 (home: 5–1; road: 3–4)

Game	Date	Team	Score	High points	High rebounds	High assists	Location Attendance	Record
70	April 1; 9:30 p.m. CST	@ L.A. Lakers	L 88–101	Olajuwon (28)	Olajuwon (12)	Smith (8)	Great Western Forum; 15,316	50–20
71	April 3; 5:00 p.m. CDT	@ L.A. Clippers	W 106–98	Olajuwon (39)	Olajuwon (11)	Smith (7)	Los Angeles Memorial Sports Arena; 10,474	51–20
72	April 7; 7:00 p.m. CDT	Golden State	W 134–102	Olajuwon (26)	Olajuwon (13)	Olajuwon (10)	The Summit; 15,914	52–20
73	April 9; 2:30 p.m. CDT	San Antonio	W 100–89	Maxwell (27)	Olajuwon (13)	Olajuwon; Smith (7)	The Summit; 16,611	53–20
74	April 10; 8:00 p.m. CDT	@ Denver	W 93–92	Olajuwon (31)	Olajuwon (12)	Cassell (5)	McNichols Sports Arena; 17,171	54–20
75	April 12; 7:30 p.m. CDT	Minnesota	W 98–89	Olajuwon (42)	Horry (13)	Maxwell (8)	The Summit; 12,048	55–20
76	April 14; 7:30 p.m. CDT	Sacramento	W 104–99	Olajuwon (34)	Horry (14)	Cassell; Horry (7)	The Summit; 13,127	56–20
77	April 16; 2:30 p.m. CDT	@ Seattle	L 97–100	Olajuwon (31)	Olajuwon; Thorpe (8)	Smith (6)	Seattle Center Coliseum; 14,813	56–21
78	April 17; 9:30 p.m. CDT	@ Portland	W 119–110	Olajuwon (29)	Olajuwon (12)	Maxwell (8)	Memorial Coliseum; 12,888	57–21
79	April 19; 7:00 p.m. CDT	@ San Antonio	L 80–90	Olajuwon (25)	Thorpe (15)	Cassell; Smith (5)	Alamodome; 32,807	57–22
80	April 21; 7:30 p.m. CDT	Dallas	W 104–93	Olajuwon (21)	Olajuwon (14)	Cassell; Maxwell (7)	The Summit; 14,081	58–22
81	April 22; 7:30 p.m. CDT	@ Dallas	L 95–107	Smith; Thorpe (19)	Thorpe (15)	Cassell (8)	Reunion Arena; 13,865	58–23
82	April 24; 2:30 p.m. CDT	Denver	L 107–115	Olajuwon (34)	Olajuwon (13)	Cassell (8)	The Summit; 16,611	58–24

1993–94 schedule

=== Playoffs ===
1994 playoff game log
Western Conference First Round: 3–1 (home: 2–0; road: 1–1)

Game	Date	Team	Score	High points	High rebounds	High assists	Location Attendance	Series
1	April 29; 8:30 p.m. CDT	Portland	W 114–104	Olajuwon (26)	Thorpe (12)	Maxwell; Smith (7)	The Summit; 16,333	1–0
2	May 1; 8:00 p.m. CDT	Portland	W 115–104	Olajuwon (46)	Thorpe (12)	Cassell (9)	The Summit; 16,355	2–0
3	May 3; 9:30 p.m. CDT	@ Portland	L 115–118	Olajuwon (36)	Thorpe (11)	Horry; Olajuwon (6)	Memorial Coliseum; 12,888	2–1
4	May 6; 9:30 p.m. CDT	@ Portland	W 92–89	Olajuwon (28)	Olajuwon (16)	Maxwell; Olajuwon; Smith (3)	Memorial Coliseum; 12,888	3–1

Western Conference Semifinals: 4–3 (home: 2–2; road: 2–1)

Game	Date	Team	Score	High points	High rebounds	High assists	Location Attendance	Series
1	May 8; 2:00 p.m. CDT	Phoenix	L 87–91	Olajuwon (36)	Olajuwon (16)	Horry; Maxwell (8)	The Summit; 15,073	0–1
2	May 11; 8:30 p.m. CDT	Phoenix	L 117–124 (OT)	Olajuwon (31)	Olajuwon (17)	Maxwell (9)	The Summit; 16,611	0–2
3	May 13; 9:30 p.m. CDT	@ Phoenix	W 118–102	Maxwell (34)	Olajuwon (15)	Cassell (10)	America West Arena; 19,023	1–2
4	May 15; 2:15 p.m. CDT	@ Phoenix	W 107–96	Olajuwon (28)	Thorpe (13)	Olajuwon (8)	America West Arena; 19,023	2–2
5	May 17; 8:45 p.m. CDT	Phoenix	W 109–86	Olajuwon; Thorpe (20)	Olajuwon (13)	Smith (8)	The Summit; 16,611	3–2
6	May 19; 10:30 p.m. CDT	@ Phoenix	L 89–103	Olajuwon (23)	Olajuwon (12)	Olajuwon (5)	America West Arena; 19,023	3–3
7	May 21; 12 Noon CDT	Phoenix	W 104–94	Olajuwon (37)	Olajuwon (17)	Cassell (7)	The Summit; 16,611	4–3

Western Conference Finals: 4–1 (home: 3–0; road: 1–1)

Game	Date	Team	Score	High points	High rebounds	High assists	Location Attendance	Series
1	May 23; 8:00 p.m. CDT	Utah	W 100–86	Olajuqon (31)	Horry (11)	Cassell (7)	The Summit; 16,611	1–0
2	May 25; 8:00 p.m. CDT	Utah	W 104–99	Olajuwon (41)	Olajuwon (13)	Smith (7)	The Summit; 16,611	2–0
3	May 27; 8:00 p.m. CDT	@ Utah	L 86–95	Olajuwon (29)	Olajuwon (13)	Olajuwon (5)	Delta Center; 19,911	2–1
4	May 29; 2:30 p.m. CDT	@ Utah	W 80–78	Smith (25)	Horry (10)	Horry (5)	Delta Center; 19,911	3–1
5	May 31; 8:00 p.m. CDT	Utah	W 94–83	Horry; Olajuwon (22)	Thorpe (16)	Cassell (7)	The Summit; 16,611	4–1

NBA Finals: 4–3 (home: 3–1; road: 1–2)

Game	Date	Team	Score	High points	High rebounds	High assists	Location Attendance	Series
1	June 8; 8:00 p.m. CDT	New York	W 85–78	Olajuwon (28)	Thorpe (16)	Smith (5)	The Summit; 16,611	1–0
2	June 10; 8:00 p.m. CDT	New York	L 83–91	Olajuwon (25)	Thorpe (12)	Smith (6)	The Summit; 16,611	1–1
3	June 12; 6:00 p.m. CDT	@ New York	W 93–89	Olajuwon (21)	Olajuwon (11)	Olajuwon (7)	Madison Square Garden; 19,763	2–1
4	June 15; 8:00 p.m. CDT	@ New York	L 82–91	Olajuwon (32)	Thorpe (10)	Cassell (5)	Madison Square Garden; 19,763	2–2
5	June 17; 8:00 p.m. CDT	@ New York	L 84–91	Olajuwon (27)	Thorpe (13)	Horry (6)	Madison Square Garden; 19,763	2–3
6	June 19; 6:00 p.m. CDT	New York	W 86–84	Olajuwon (30)	Olajuwon; Thorpe (10)	Thorpe (6)	The Summit; 16,611	3–3
7	June 22; 8:00 p.m. CDT	New York	W 90–84	Olajuwon (25)	Olajuwon (10)	Olajuwon (7)	The Summit; 16,611	4–3

1994 schedule

=== Interruption of Game 5 NBA Finals telecast by O. J. Simpson car chase ===
On June 17, 1994, during Game 5 between the Rockets and the Knicks at Madison Square Garden, most NBC affiliates (with the noted exception being WNBC-TV out of New York City, New York), split the coverage of the game between NFL Hall of Famer O. J. Simpson's slow-speed freeway chase with the Los Angeles Police Department. At the time, Simpson had been an NFL analyst on NBC. A visibly confused and distraught Bob Costas, who was NBC's anchor for their NBA Finals coverage at the time, said during the telecast from Madison Square Garden that the Simpson situation was "not just tragic, but now surreal".

== Player statistics ==
Legend
GP	Games played	GS	Games started	MPG	Minutes per game
FG%	Field-goal percentage	3P%	3-point field-goal percentage	FT%	Free-throw percentage
RPG	Rebounds per game	APG	Assists per game	SPG	Steals per game
BPG	Blocks per game	PPG	Points per game

=== Regular season ===
Player	GP	GS	MPG	FG%	3P%	FT%	RPG	APG	SPG	BPG	PPG
Scott Brooks	73	0	16.8	.491	.377	.871	1.4	2.0	.70	.03	5.2
Matt Bullard	65	0	11.2	.345	.325	.769	1.3	1.0	.22	.09	3.5
Sam Cassell	66	6	17.0	.418	.295	.841	2.0	2.9	.89	.11	6.7
Earl Cureton	2	0	15.0	.250	.000	.000	6.0	.0	.00	.00	2.0
Mario Elie	67	8	24.0	.446	.335	.860	2.7	3.1	.75	.12	9.3
Carl Herrera	75	0	17.2	.458	.000	.711	3.8	.5	.43	.35	4.7
Robert Horry	81	81	29.3	.459	.324	.732	5.4	2.9	1.47	.93	9.9
Chris Jent	3	0	26.0	.500	.364	.500	5.0	2.3	.00	.00	10.3
Vernon Maxwell	75	73	34.3	.389	.298	.749	3.1	5.1	1.67	.27	13.6
Hakeem Olajuwon	80	80	41.0	.528	.421	.716	11.9	3.6	1.60	3.71	27.3
Richard Petruška	22	0	4.2	.435	.467	.750	1.4	.0	.09	.14	2.4
Eric Riley	47	2	4.7	.486	.000	.541	1.3	.2	.11	.19	1.9
Larry Robinson	6	0	9.2	.500	.250	.375	1.7	1.0	1.17	.00	4.2
Kenny Smith	78	78	28.3	.480	.405	.871	1.8	4.2	.76	.05	11.6
Otis Thorpe	82	82	35.5	.561	.000	.657	10.6	2.3	.80	.34	14.0

=== Playoffs ===
Player	GP	GS	MPG	FG%	3P%	FT%	RPG	APG	SPG	BPG	PPG
Scott Brooks	5	0	4.6	.833	1.000	.000	.4	.6	.00	.00	2.2
Matt Bullard	10	0	5.5	.211	.200	.750	1.0	.0	.10	.20	1.6
Sam Cassell	22	0	21.7	.394	.378	.865	2.7	4.2	.95	.23	9.4
Earl Cureton	10	0	10.0	.800	.000	1.000	2.9	.2	.10	.20	1.8
Mario Elie	23	0	16.6	.396	.313	.851	1.7	1.7	.35	.13	5.8
Carl Herrera	16	0	15.5	.534	.000	.813	2.8	.2	.31	.19	4.7
Robert Horry	23	23	33.8	.434	.382	.765	6.1	3.6	1.52	.87	11.7
Chris Jent	11	0	5.6	.250	.231	.000	.8	.6	.18	.00	1.2
Vernon Maxwell	23	23	38.3	.376	.326	.685	3.5	4.2	.87	.09	13.8
Hakeem Olajuwon	23	23	43.0	.519	.500	.795	11.0	4.3	1.74	4.00	28.9
Kenny Smith	23	23	30.3	.455	.447	.808	2.3	4.1	.96	.17	10.8
Otis Thorpe	23	23	37.1	.572	.500	.567	9.9	2.3	.57	.43	11.3

Player statistics citation:

== Award winners ==
Name	Award	
Hakeem Olajuwon	NBA Player of the Week	November 15, 1993
Hakeem Olajuwon	NBA Player of the Week	March 21, 1994
Hakeem Olajuwon	NBA Player of the Month	November 1993
Hakeem Olajuwon	NBA Defensive Player of the Year Award	
Hakeem Olajuwon	NBA All-Defensive First Team	
Hakeem Olajuwon	NBA Most Valuable Player Award	
Hakeem Olajuwon	All-NBA First Team	
Hakeem Olajuwon	NBA Most Valuable Player Award	
Rudy Tomjanovich	NBA Coach of the Month	November 1993

== Transactions ==
=== Trades ===
August 2, 1993	To Houston Rockets Mario Elie	To Portland Trail Blazers 1995 POR second-round pick

==== Additions ====
Date	Player	Former team	Ref.

==== Subtractions ====
Date	Player	Reason left	New team	Ref.
July 1, 1993	Kennard Winchester	Waived		
August 2, 1993	Sleepy Floyd	Waived		
November 1, 1993	Dave Jamerson	Waived		
November 2, 1993	Ashraf Amaya	Waived		
