= 1993–94 Portland Trail Blazers season =

NBA professional basketball team season

- Head coach: Rick Adelman
- Arena: Memorial Coliseum

Results
- Record: 47–35 (.573)
- Place: Division: 4th (Pacific); Conference: 7th (Western)
- Playoff finish: First round (lost to Rockets 1–3)
- Stats at Basketball Reference

Local media
- Television: KOIN; Prime Sports Northwest
- Radio: KEX

The 1993–94 Portland Trail Blazers season was the 24th season for the Portland Trail Blazers in the National Basketball Association.

== Season summary ==
=== Off-season ===
During the off-season, the Trail Blazers acquired Harvey Grant from the Washington Bullets, and signed free agent Chris Dudley. However, Dudley suffered an ankle injury in November, and only played just six games.

=== Regular season ===
With the addition of Grant, the Trail Blazers got off to an 8–5 start to the regular season in November, posted a five-game winning streak in January, and later on held a 27–20 record at the All-Star break. The team posted a six-game winning streak in February, but later on lost five of their final seven games of the season. The Trail Blazers finished in fourth place in the Pacific Division with a 47–35 record, and earned the seventh seed in the Western Conference; the team qualified for the NBA playoffs for the twelfth consecutive year.

Last season's Sixth Man of the Year Clifford Robinson became the team's starting center, averaging 20.1 points, 6.7 rebounds and 1.4 blocks per game, while Clyde Drexler averaged 19.2 points, 6.5 rebounds, 4.9 assists and 1.4 steals per game, and Rod Strickland provided the team with 17.2 points, 9.0 assists and 1.8 steals per game. In addition, Terry Porter played half of the regular season off the bench as backup point guard behind Strickland, averaging 13.1 points and 5.2 assists per game, plus leading the Trail Blazers with 110 three-point field goals, while Grant contributed 10.4 points per game, and Buck Williams provided with 9.7 points and 10.4 rebounds per game. Off the bench, second-year forward Tracy Murray contributed 6.6 points per game and shot .459 in three-point percentage, while Jerome Kersey provided with 6.5 points and 4.2 rebounds per game, and Mark Bryant averaged 5.6 points and 4.0 rebounds per game.

During the NBA All-Star weekend at the Target Center in Minneapolis, Minnesota, Robinson and Drexler were both selected for the 1994 NBA All-Star Game, as members of the Western Conference All-Star team; it was Robinson's first and only All-Star appearance. Meanwhile, rookie shooting guard, and first-round draft pick James Robinson participated in the NBA Slam Dunk Contest. Strickland finished tied in fourth place in Most Improved Player voting.

The Trail Blazers finished 24th in the NBA in home-game attendance, with an attendance of 528,408 at the Memorial Coliseum during the regular season, which was the fourth-lowest in the league.

=== NBA playoffs ===
In the Western Conference First Round of the 1994 NBA playoffs, the Trail Blazers faced off against the 2nd–seeded, and Midwest Division champion Houston Rockets, a team that featured All-Star center, Most Valuable Player and Defensive Player of the Year, Hakeem Olajuwon, Otis Thorpe and Vernon Maxwell. The Trail Blazers lost the first two games to the Rockets on the road at The Summit, before winning Game 3 at home, 118–115 at the Memorial Coliseum. However, the Trail Blazers lost Game 4 to the Rockets at home, 92–89, thus losing the series in four games.

The Rockets would go on to defeat the New York Knicks in a full seven-game series in the 1994 NBA Finals, winning their first ever NBA championship in franchise history.

=== Aftermath ===
Following the season, head coach Rick Adelman was fired after coaching the Trail Blazers for five in a half seasons. Game 4 of the Rockets-Blazers series would be the last NBA playoff game Drexler would play as a member of the Trail Blazers, the team that drafted him; this was also his final full season with the Trail Blazers, as he would be traded to the Rockets on February 14, 1995 (right before the following season's trade deadline), honoring his wish to be traded to a contender.

== NBA draft ==
| Round | Pick | Player | Position | Nationality | School/Club team |
|---|---|---|---|---|---|
| 1 | 21 | James Robinson | SG/PG | United States | Alabama |
| 2 | 48 | Kevin Thompson | C | United States | NC State |

== Roster ==
1993–94 Portland Trail Blazers roster
Players

| Pos. | No. | Player | Height | Weight | DOB | From |
|---|---|---|---|---|---|---|
| C | 2 | Mark Bryant | 6 ft 9 in (2.06 m) | 245 lb (111 kg) | 1965–04–25 | Seton Hall |
| G | 22 | Clyde Drexler | 6 ft 7 in (2.01 m) | 210 lb (95 kg) | 1962–06–22 | Houston |
| C | 24 | Chris Dudley | 6 ft 11 in (2.11 m) | 235 lb (107 kg) | 1965–02–22 | Yale |
| F | 44 | Harvey Grant | 6 ft 8 in (2.03 m) | 195 lb (88 kg) | 1965–07–04 | Oklahoma |
| G | 21 | Jaren Jackson | 6 ft 4 in (1.93 m) | 190 lb (86 kg) | 1967–10–27 | Georgetown |
| F | 25 | Jerome Kersey | 6 ft 7 in (2.01 m) | 215 lb (98 kg) | 1962–06–26 | Longwood |
| F | 31 | Tracy Murray | 6 ft 7 in (2.01 m) | 225 lb (102 kg) | 1971–07–25 | UCLA |
| G | 30 | Terry Porter | 6 ft 3 in (1.91 m) | 195 lb (88 kg) | 1963–04–08 | UW–Stevens Point |
| C | 3 | Clifford Robinson | 6 ft 10 in (2.08 m) | 225 lb (102 kg) | 1966–12–16 | Connecticut |
| G | 26 | James Robinson | 6 ft 2 in (1.88 m) | 180 lb (82 kg) | 1970–08–31 | Alabama |
| F | 54 | Reggie Smith | 6 ft 10 in (2.08 m) | 240 lb (109 kg) | 1970–08–21 | TCU |
| G | 1 | Rod Strickland | 6 ft 3 in (1.91 m) | 175 lb (79 kg) | 1966–07–11 | DePaul |
| C | 35 | Kevin Thompson | 6 ft 11 in (2.11 m) | 260 lb (118 kg) | 1971–02–07 | NC State |
| F | 52 | Buck Williams | 6 ft 8 in (2.03 m) | 215 lb (98 kg) | 1960–03–08 | Maryland |

Coaches
Head coach
- Rick Adelman
Assistant(s)
- Kip Motta
- Jack Schalow
- John Wetzel

Legend
- (DP) Unsigned draft pick
- (FA) Free agent
- (S) Suspended
- Injured

Roster

== Regular season ==
=== Season standings ===
| Pacific Division | W | L | PCT | GB | Home | Road | Div |
|---|---|---|---|---|---|---|---|
| y-Seattle SuperSonics | 63 | 19 | .768 | — | 37–4 | 26–15 | 25–5 |
| x-Phoenix Suns | 56 | 26 | .683 | 7 | 36–5 | 20–21 | 19–11 |
| x-Golden State Warriors | 50 | 32 | .610 | 13 | 29–12 | 21–20 | 19–11 |
| x-Portland Trail Blazers | 47 | 35 | .573 | 16 | 30–11 | 17–24 | 17–13 |
| Los Angeles Lakers | 33 | 49 | .402 | 30 | 21–20 | 12–29 | 7–23 |
| Sacramento Kings | 28 | 54 | .341 | 35 | 20–21 | 8–33 | 9–21 |
| Los Angeles Clippers | 27 | 55 | .329 | 36 | 17–24 | 10–31 | 9–21 |

| # | Western Conference | | | | |
| # | Team | W | L | PCT | GB |
|---|---|---|---|---|---|
| 1 | z-Seattle SuperSonics | 63 | 19 | .768 | – |
| 2 | y-Houston Rockets | 58 | 24 | .707 | 5 |
| 3 | x-Phoenix Suns | 56 | 26 | .683 | 7 |
| 4 | x-San Antonio Spurs | 55 | 27 | .671 | 8 |
| 5 | x-Utah Jazz | 53 | 29 | .646 | 10 |
| 6 | x-Golden State Warriors | 50 | 32 | .610 | 13 |
| 7 | x-Portland Trail Blazers | 47 | 35 | .573 | 16 |
| 8 | x-Denver Nuggets | 42 | 40 | .512 | 21 |
| 9 | Los Angeles Lakers | 33 | 49 | .402 | 30 |
| 10 | Sacramento Kings | 28 | 54 | .341 | 35 |
| 11 | Los Angeles Clippers | 27 | 55 | .329 | 36 |
| 12 | Minnesota Timberwolves | 20 | 62 | .244 | 43 |
| 13 | Dallas Mavericks | 13 | 69 | .159 | 50 |

z – clinched division title
y – clinched division title
x – clinched playoff spot

\

== Game log ==
=== Regular season ===
1993–94 game log
Total: 47–35 (Home: 30–11; Road: 17–24)
November: 8–5 (home: 6–2; road: 2–3)

| Game | Date | Team | Score | High points | High rebounds | High assists | Location Attendance | Record |
|---|---|---|---|---|---|---|---|---|
| 2 | November 7; 7:30 p.m. PST | Houston | L 92–106 | Robinson (25) | Williams (8) | Porter (6) | Memorial Coliseum; 12,888 | 0–2 |

December: 9–6 (home: 5–2; road: 4–4)

| Game | Date | Team | Score | High points | High rebounds | High assists | Location Attendance | Record |

January: 8–6 (home: 6–2; road: 2–4)

| Game | Date | Team | Score | High points | High rebounds | High assists | Location Attendance | Record |
|---|---|---|---|---|---|---|---|---|
| 30 | January 4; 5:30 p.m. PST | @ Houston | L 95–106 | Porter (24) | Tied (10) | Porter (9) | The Summit; 16,611 | 17–13 |

February: 9–4 (home: 7–0; road: 2–4)

| Game | Date | Team | Score | High points | High rebounds | High assists | Location Attendance | Record |

March: 7–9 (home: 4–2; road: 3–7)

| Game | Date | Team | Score | High points | High rebounds | High assists | Location Attendance | Record |
|---|---|---|---|---|---|---|---|---|
| 63 | March 15; 5:30 p.m. PST | @ Houston | L 99–105 | Grant (25) | WIlliams (9) | Strickland (8) | The Summit; 15,930 | 38–25 |

April: 6–5 (home: 2–3; road: 4–2)

| Game | Date | Team | Score | High points | High rebounds | High assists | Location Attendance | Record |
|---|---|---|---|---|---|---|---|---|
| 79 | April 17; 7:30 p.m. PDT | Houston | L 110–119 | Kersey (24) | Kersey (11) | Strickland (9) | Memorial Coliseum; 12,888 | 46–33 |

1993–94 schedule

== Playoffs ==
1994 playoff game log
Western Conference First Round: 1–3 (home: 1–1; road: 0–2)

| Game | Date | Team | Score | High points | High rebounds | High assists | Location Attendance | Series |
|---|---|---|---|---|---|---|---|---|
| 1 | April 29; 6:30 p.m. PDT | @ Houston | L 104–114 | Drexler (26) | Drexler (13) | Drexler (6) | The Summit; 16,333 | 0–1 |
| 2 | May 1; 6:00 p.m. PDT | @ Houston | L 104–115 | Robinson (28) | Drexler (9) | Strickland (12) | The Summit; 16,355 | 0–2 |
| 3 | May 3; 7:30 p.m. PDT | Houston | W 118–115 | Strickland (25) | Tied (10) | Strickland (15) | Memorial Coliseum; 12,888 | 1–2 |
| 4 | May 6; 7:30 p.m. PDT | Houston | L 89–92 | Strickland (26) | Drexler (13) | Strickland (7) | Memorial Coliseum; 12,888 | 1–3 |

1994 schedule

== Player statistics ==
Legend
| GP | Games played | GS | Games started | MPG | Minutes per game |
| FG% | Field-goal percentage | 3P% | 3-point field-goal percentage | FT% | Free-throw percentage |
| RPG | Rebounds per game | APG | Assists per game | SPG | Steals per game |
| BPG | Blocks per game | PPG | Points per game |

=== Regular season ===
| Player | GP | GS | MPG | FG% | 3P% | FT% | RPG | APG | SPG | BPG | PPG |
|---|---|---|---|---|---|---|---|---|---|---|---|
| Clifford Robinson | 82 | 64 | 34.8 | .457 | .245 | .765 | 6.7 | 1.9 | 1.4 | 1.4 | 20.1 |
| Rod Strickland | 82 | 58 | 35.2 | .483 | .200 | .749 | 4.5 | 9.0 | 1.8 | .3 | 17.2 |
| Buck Williams | 81 | 81 | 32.5 | .555 | .000 | .679 | 10.4 | 1.0 | .7 | .6 | 9.7 |
| Mark Bryant | 79 | 10 | 18.2 | .482 | .000 | .692 | 4.0 | .5 | .4 | .4 | 5.6 |
| Jerome Kersey | 78 | 6 | 16.4 | .433 | .125 | .748 | 4.2 | 1.0 | .9 | .6 | 6.5 |
| Harvey Grant | 77 | 73 | 27.4 | .460 | .286 | .641 | 4.6 | 1.4 | .9 | .6 | 10.4 |
| Terry Porter | 77 | 34 | 26.9 | .416 | .390 | .872 | 2.8 | 5.2 | 1.0 | .2 | 13.1 |
| Clyde Drexler | 68 | 68 | 34.3 | .428 | .324 | .777 | 6.5 | 4.9 | 1.4 | .5 | 19.2 |
| Tracy Murray | 66 | 1 | 12.4 | .470 | .459 | .694 | 1.7 | .5 | .3 | .3 | 6.6 |
| James Robinson | 58 | 3 | 11.6 | .365 | .315 | .672 | 1.3 | 1.2 | .5 | .3 | 4.8 |
| Reggie Smith | 43 | 9 | 7.3 | .403 | | .474 | 2.3 | .1 | .3 | .1 | 1.8 |
| Jaren Jackson | 29 | 0 | 6.4 | .391 | .000 | .857 | .6 | .9 | .1 | .1 | 2.8 |
| Kevin Thompson | 14 | 0 | 4.1 | .429 | .000 | .500 | .9 | .2 | .0 | .1 | .9 |
| Chris Dudley | 6 | 3 | 14.3 | .240 | | .500 | 4.0 | .8 | .7 | .5 | 2.3 |

=== Playoffs ===
| Player | GP | GS | MPG | FG% | 3P% | FT% | RPG | APG | SPG | BPG | PPG |
|---|---|---|---|---|---|---|---|---|---|---|---|
| Clyde Drexler | 4 | 4 | 39.3 | .425 | .231 | .826 | 10.3 | 5.5 | 2.0 | .5 | 21.0 |
| Rod Strickland | 4 | 4 | 38.5 | .500 | .000 | .815 | 4.0 | 9.8 | 1.0 | .5 | 23.5 |
| Clifford Robinson | 4 | 4 | 37.3 | .412 | .222 | .875 | 6.3 | 2.5 | .8 | 1.5 | 16.3 |
| Buck Williams | 4 | 4 | 31.3 | .679 | | .867 | 8.8 | .5 | 1.0 | .5 | 12.8 |
| Chris Dudley | 4 | 2 | 20.3 | .400 | | .500 | 3.8 | .0 | 1.5 | .0 | 2.3 |
| Harvey Grant | 4 | 1 | 19.0 | .515 | | | 2.3 | .8 | .3 | .5 | 8.5 |
| Mark Bryant | 4 | 1 | 16.0 | .294 | .000 | | 3.0 | .5 | .5 | .5 | 2.5 |
| Terry Porter | 4 | 0 | 19.0 | .343 | .429 | .786 | 3.0 | 2.3 | 1.0 | .0 | 10.3 |
| James Robinson | 4 | 0 | 7.0 | .400 | .500 | .500 | .8 | 1.5 | .3 | .3 | 2.5 |
| Jerome Kersey | 3 | 0 | 12.7 | .313 | | .200 | 3.0 | .0 | .3 | .3 | 3.7 |
| Tracy Murray | 2 | 0 | 5.5 | .500 | .000 | | 1.5 | .5 | .5 | .0 | 3.0 |
| Jaren Jackson | 1 | 0 | 1.0 | | | | .0 | .0 | .0 | .0 | .0 |

- ^{†} Denotes player spent time with another team in the season. Stats reflect time with the Trail Blazers only.

Player statistics citation:

== Awards and honors ==
- Clyde Drexler, NBA All-Star
- Cliff Robinson, NBA All-Star
