= 1993–94 Golden State Warriors season =

NBA professional basketball team season

- Head coach: Don Nelson
- General manager: Don Nelson
- Owners: Jim Fitzgerald; Dan Finnane
- Arena: Oakland-Alameda County Coliseum Arena

Results
- Record: 50–32 (.610)
- Place: Division: 3rd (Pacific); Conference: 6th (Western)
- Playoff finish: First round (lost to Suns 0–3)
- Stats at Basketball Reference

Local media
- Television: KPIX-TV; KICU-TV; SportsChannel Pacific
- Radio: KNBR

The 1993–94 Golden State Warriors season was the 48th season for the Golden State Warriors in the National Basketball Association, and their 31st season in the San Francisco Bay Area.

== Season summary ==
=== Off-season ===
Despite finishing with a 34–48 record the previous season, the Warriors received the third overall pick in the 1993 NBA draft, and selected shooting guard Penny Hardaway from the University of Memphis, but soon traded him to the Orlando Magic in exchange for rookie power forward, and top draft pick Chris Webber from the University of Michigan; Webber was selected as the first overall pick in the draft by the Magic. During the off-season, the team signed free agent Avery Johnson. However, the Warriors lost All-Star guard Tim Hardaway, and sixth man Šarūnas Marčiulionis to knee injuries, as both players would miss the entire regular season.

=== Regular season ===
With the addition of Webber and Johnson, along with the absence of Hardaway and Marčiulionis, and with Chris Mullin missing the first 20 games of the regular season due to a finger injury, the Warriors struggled losing six of their first nine games of the season. However, the team soon recovered and later on held a 27–20 record at the All-Star break. The Warriors posted an eight-game winning streak in April, and finished in third place in the Pacific Division with a solid 50–32 record, which was a 16-game improvement over the previous season; the team earned the sixth seed in the Western Conference, and returned to the NBA playoffs after a one-year absence.

Second-year star Latrell Sprewell averaged 21.0 points, 4.7 assists and 2.2 steals per game, led the Warriors with 141 three-point field goals, and was named to the All-NBA First Team, and to the NBA All-Defensive Second Team, while Webber averaged 17.5 points, 9.1 rebounds, 3.6 assists and 2.2. blocks per game, and was named the NBA Rookie of the Year, and was also named to the NBA All-Rookie First Team. In addition, Mullin played half of the regular season off the bench, averaging 16.8 points, 5.6 rebounds and 5.1 assists per game, while Billy Owens provided the team with 15.0 points, 8.1 rebounds and 4.1 assists per game, and Johnson contributed 10.9 points and 5.3 assists per game. Meanwhile, Victor Alexander averaged 8.7 points and 4.5 rebounds per game, Chris Gatling provided with 8.2 points and 4.8 rebounds per game, Jeff Grayer contributed 6.8 points per game, and second-year guard Keith Jennings contributed 5.7 points and 2.9 assists per game.

During the NBA All-Star weekend at the Target Center in Minneapolis, Minnesota, Sprewell was selected for the 1994 NBA All-Star Game, as a member of the Western Conference All-Star team; it was his first ever All-Star appearance. Meanwhile, Webber was selected for the inaugural NBA Rookie Game, as a member of the Phenoms team; Webber scored 18 points along with 10 rebounds, as the Phenoms defeated the Sensations team, 74–68. Sprewell finished in second place in Most Improved Player voting, behind Don MacLean of the Washington Bullets, and also finished tied in eleventh place in Most Valuable Player voting, while head coach Don Nelson finished tied in fifth place in Coach of the Year voting.

The Warriors finished 17th in the NBA in home-game attendance, with an attendance of 616,025 at the Oakland-Alameda County Coliseum Arena during the regular season.

=== NBA playoffs ===
In the Western Conference First Round of the 1994 NBA playoffs, the Warriors faced off against the 3rd–seeded Phoenix Suns, who were led by the All-Star trio of Charles Barkley, Kevin Johnson, and three-point specialist Dan Majerle. The Warriors lost the first two games to the Suns on the road at the America West Arena, before losing Game 3 at home, 140–133 at the Oakland-Alameda County Coliseum Arena, in which Barkley scored a playoff career-high of 56 points; the Warriors lost the series to the Suns in a three-game sweep.

This would also be the Warriors' final NBA playoff appearance until the 2006–07 season, as what would follow was a twelve-year playoff drought.

=== Aftermath ===
Following the season, Owens was traded to the Miami Heat, while Marčiulionis and second-year forward Byron Houston were both traded to the Seattle SuperSonics, and Johnson re-signed as a free agent with his former team, the San Antonio Spurs.

== Offseason ==
=== Draft picks ===
| Round | Pick | Player | Position | Nationality | College |
|---|---|---|---|---|---|
| 1 | 3 | Penny Hardaway | PG/SG | United States | Memphis |
| 2 | 34 | Darnell Mee | SG | United States | Western Kentucky |

== Roster ==
1993–94 Golden State Warriors roster
Players

| Pos. | No. | Player | Height | Weight | DOB | From |
|---|---|---|---|---|---|---|
| C | 52 | Victor Alexander | 6 ft 9 in (2.06 m) | 265 lb (120 kg) | 1969–08–31 | Iowa State |
| F | 35 | Jud Buechler | 6 ft 6 in (1.98 m) | 220 lb (100 kg) | 1968–06–19 | Arizona |
| C | 25 | Chris Gatling | 6 ft 10 in (2.08 m) | 220 lb (100 kg) | 1967–09–03 | Old Dominion |
| F | 11 | Josh Grant | 6 ft 9 in (2.06 m) | 223 lb (101 kg) | 1967–08–07 | Utah |
| G | 44 | Jeff Grayer | 6 ft 5 in (1.96 m) | 200 lb (91 kg) | 1965–12–17 | Iowa State |
| G | 10 | Tim Hardaway (IN) | 6 ft 0 in (1.83 m) | 175 lb (79 kg) | 1966–09–01 | UTEP |
| F | 21 | Byron Houston | 6 ft 5 in (1.96 m) | 250 lb (113 kg) | 1969–11–22 | Oklahoma State |
| G | 2 | Keith Jennings | 5 ft 7 in (1.70 m) | 160 lb (73 kg) | 1968–11–02 | East Tennessee State |
| G | 6 | Avery Johnson | 5 ft 10 in (1.78 m) | 175 lb (79 kg) | 1965–03–25 | Southern |
| G | 13 | Šarūnas Marčiulionis (IN) | 6 ft 5 in (1.96 m) | 200 lb (91 kg) | 1964–06–13 | Lithuania |
| F | 17 | Chris Mullin | 6 ft 6 in (1.98 m) | 200 lb (91 kg) | 1963–07–30 | St. John's |
| F | 30 | Billy Owens | 6 ft 8 in (2.03 m) | 220 lb (100 kg) | 1969–05–01 | Syracuse |
| G | 15 | Latrell Sprewell | 6 ft 5 in (1.96 m) | 190 lb (86 kg) | 1970–09–08 | Alabama |
| C | 4 | Chris Webber | 6 ft 9 in (2.06 m) | 245 lb (111 kg) | 1973–03–01 | Michigan |

Coaches
Head coach
- Don Nelson
Assistant(s)
- Gregg Popovich
- Paul Pressey
- Donnie Nelson

Legend
- (DP) Unsigned draft pick
- (FA) Free agent
- (S) Suspended
- (IN) Inactive
- Injured

Roster
Updated: February 28, 1994

=== Roster Notes ===
- Point guard Tim Hardaway, and shooting guard Šarūnas Marčiulionis were both on the injured reserve list due to knee injuries, and missed the entire regular season.

== Regular season ==
=== Season standings ===
| Pacific Division | W | L | PCT | GB | Home | Road | Div |
|---|---|---|---|---|---|---|---|
| y-Seattle SuperSonics | 63 | 19 | .768 | — | 37–4 | 26–15 | 25–5 |
| x-Phoenix Suns | 56 | 26 | .683 | 7 | 36–5 | 20–21 | 19–11 |
| x-Golden State Warriors | 50 | 32 | .610 | 13 | 29–12 | 21–20 | 19–11 |
| x-Portland Trail Blazers | 47 | 35 | .573 | 16 | 30–11 | 17–24 | 17–13 |
| Los Angeles Lakers | 33 | 49 | .402 | 30 | 21–20 | 12–29 | 7–23 |
| Sacramento Kings | 28 | 54 | .341 | 35 | 20–21 | 8–33 | 9–21 |
| Los Angeles Clippers | 27 | 55 | .329 | 36 | 17–24 | 10–31 | 9–21 |

| # | Western Conference | | | | |
| # | Team | W | L | PCT | GB |
|---|---|---|---|---|---|
| 1 | z-Seattle SuperSonics | 63 | 19 | .768 | – |
| 2 | y-Houston Rockets | 58 | 24 | .707 | 5 |
| 3 | x-Phoenix Suns | 56 | 26 | .683 | 7 |
| 4 | x-San Antonio Spurs | 55 | 27 | .671 | 8 |
| 5 | x-Utah Jazz | 53 | 29 | .646 | 10 |
| 6 | x-Golden State Warriors | 50 | 32 | .610 | 13 |
| 7 | x-Portland Trail Blazers | 47 | 35 | .573 | 16 |
| 8 | x-Denver Nuggets | 42 | 40 | .512 | 21 |
| 9 | Los Angeles Lakers | 33 | 49 | .402 | 30 |
| 10 | Sacramento Kings | 28 | 54 | .341 | 35 |
| 11 | Los Angeles Clippers | 27 | 55 | .329 | 36 |
| 12 | Minnesota Timberwolves | 20 | 62 | .244 | 43 |
| 13 | Dallas Mavericks | 13 | 69 | .159 | 50 |

z - clinched division title
y - clinched division title
x - clinched playoff spot

== Playoffs ==
=== Game log ===
1994 playoff game log
First round: 0–3 (home: 0–1; road: 0–2)

| Game | Date | Team | Score | High points | High rebounds | High assists | Location Attendance | Series |
|---|---|---|---|---|---|---|---|---|
| 1 | April 29 | @ Phoenix | L 104–111 | Billy Owens (27) | Billy Owens (17) | Latrell Sprewell (10) | America West Arena; 19,023 | 0–1 |
| 2 | May 1 | @ Phoenix | L 111–117 | Chris Mullin (32) | Chris Webber (10) | Chris Webber (9) | America West Arena; 19,023 | 0–2 |
| 3 | May 4 | Phoenix | L 133–140 | Chris Mullin (30) | Webber, Gatling (8) | Chris Webber (13) | Oakland-Alameda County Coliseum Arena; 15,025 | 0–3 |

1994 schedule

== Player statistics ==
Legend
| GP | Games played | GS | Games started | MPG | Minutes per game |
| FG% | Field-goal percentage | 3P% | 3-point field-goal percentage | FT% | Free-throw percentage |
| RPG | Rebounds per game | APG | Assists per game | SPG | Steals per game |
| BPG | Blocks per game | PPG | Points per game |

=== Regular season ===
| Player | GP | GS | MPG | FG% | 3P% | FT% | RPG | APG | SPG | BPG | PPG |
|---|---|---|---|---|---|---|---|---|---|---|---|
| Latrell Sprewell | 82 | 82 | 43.1 | .433 | .361 | .774 | 4.9 | 4.7 | 2.2 | .9 | 21.0 |
| Avery Johnson | 82 | 70 | 28.4 | .492 | .000 | .704 | 2.1 | 5.3 | 1.4 | .1 | 10.9 |
| Chris Gatling | 82 | 23 | 15.8 | .588 | .000 | .620 | 4.8 | .5 | .5 | .8 | 8.2 |
| Billy Owens | 79 | 72 | 34.7 | .507 | .200 | .610 | 8.1 | 4.1 | 1.1 | .8 | 15.0 |
| Chris Webber | 76 | 76 | 32.1 | .552 | .000 | .532 | 9.1 | 3.6 | 1.2 | 2.2 | 17.5 |
| Keith Jennings | 76 | 2 | 14.4 | .404 | .371 | .833 | 1.2 | 2.9 | .9 | .0 | 5.7 |
| Byron Houston | 71 | 2 | 12.2 | .458 | .143 | .611 | 2.7 | .5 | .5 | .4 | 2.8 |
| Victor Alexander | 69 | 39 | 19.1 | .530 | .154 | .527 | 4.5 | 1.0 | .4 | .5 | 8.7 |
| Jeff Grayer | 67 | 4 | 16.4 | .526 | .167 | .602 | 2.9 | .9 | .5 | .2 | 6.8 |
| Chris Mullin | 62 | 39 | 37.5 | .472 | .364 | .753 | 5.6 | 5.1 | 1.7 | .9 | 16.8 |
| Josh Grant | 53 | 0 | 7.2 | .404 | .279 | .759 | 1.7 | .5 | .3 | .2 | 3.0 |
| Jud Buechler | 36 | 0 | 6.1 | .500 | .414 | .500 | .9 | .4 | .2 | .0 | 2.9 |
| Andre Spencer^{†} | 5 | 1 | 12.6 | .500 | | .750 | 2.4 | .6 | .2 | .4 | 4.2 |
| Todd Lichti^{†} | 5 | 0 | 11.6 | .357 | 1.000 | .818 | 2.0 | .6 | .0 | .0 | 6.2 |
| Dell Demps | 2 | 0 | 5.5 | .333 | | .000 | .0 | .5 | 1.0 | .0 | 2.0 |
| Tod Murphy^{†} | 2 | 0 | 5.0 | | | | .5 | .5 | .0 | .0 | .0 |

=== Playoffs ===
| Player | GP | GS | MPG | FG% | 3P% | FT% | RPG | APG | SPG | BPG | PPG |
|---|---|---|---|---|---|---|---|---|---|---|---|
| Chris Mullin | 3 | 3 | 45.0 | .588 | .500 | .909 | 4.7 | 3.7 | .0 | 1.7 | 25.3 |
| Billy Owens | 3 | 3 | 42.3 | .500 | .000 | .750 | 10.0 | 4.3 | 1.3 | .7 | 19.7 |
| Latrell Sprewell | 3 | 3 | 40.7 | .433 | .348 | .667 | 3.0 | 7.0 | .7 | 1.0 | 22.7 |
| Chris Webber | 3 | 3 | 36.3 | .550 | .000 | .300 | 8.7 | 9.0 | 1.0 | 3.0 | 15.7 |
| Byron Houston | 3 | 2 | 15.3 | .750 | | .600 | 1.7 | 1.0 | .3 | .7 | 5.0 |
| Chris Gatling | 3 | 1 | 18.0 | .615 | | .769 | 5.7 | 1.3 | .7 | .3 | 8.7 |
| Jeff Grayer | 3 | 0 | 15.3 | .550 | | .667 | 2.0 | .3 | .3 | .3 | 8.0 |
| Avery Johnson | 3 | 0 | 13.7 | .529 | .000 | | 1.0 | 3.3 | 1.3 | .3 | 6.0 |
| Keith Jennings | 3 | 0 | 13.0 | .308 | .200 | .857 | 1.7 | 1.3 | .3 | .0 | 5.0 |
| Josh Grant | 1 | 0 | 1.0 | | | | .0 | .0 | .0 | .0 | .0 |

- ^{†} Denotes player spent time with another team in the season. Stats reflect time with the Warriors only.

Player statistics citation:

== Awards and records ==
- Chris Webber - Rookie of the Year, Player of the Week (Jan. 9), NBA All-Rookie First Team
- Latrell Sprewell - League Leader (Mins. Played, MPG), All-NBA First Team, NBA All-Defensive Second Team, NBA All-Star

== See also ==
- 1993-94 NBA season
