= 1993–94 San Antonio Spurs season =

- Head coach: John Lucas II
- General manager: Bob Bass
- Owner: Peter Holt
- Arena: Alamodome

Results
- Record: 55–27 (.671)
- Place: Division: 2nd (Midwest); Conference: 4th (Western)
- Playoff finish: First round (lost to Jazz 1–3)
- Stats at Basketball Reference

Local media
- Television: KSAT-TV; KABB; Home Sports Entertainment
- Radio: WOAI

The 1993–94 San Antonio Spurs season was the 18th season for the San Antonio Spurs in the National Basketball Association, and their 27th season as a franchise.

== Season summary ==
=== Off-season ===
For the season, the Spurs moved into their new arena known as the Alamodome. During the off-season, the team acquired controversial All-Star forward and rebound specialist Dennis Rodman from the Detroit Pistons, signed free agent Sleepy Floyd, and acquired Negele Knight from the Phoenix Suns during the first month of the regular season.

=== Regular season ===
With the addition of Rodman and Knight, the Spurs struggled with a 4–5 start to the regular season, but then posted an eight-game winning streak between November and December afterwards, and later on held a 35–14 record at the All-Star break. The team posted a 13-game winning streak between January and February, but lost seven of their final ten games of the season. The Spurs finished in second place in the Midwest Division with a 55–27 record, and earned the fourth seed in the Western Conference; the team qualified for the NBA playoffs for the fifth consecutive year.

David Robinson captured the scoring title averaging 29.8 points, 10.7 rebounds, 4.8 assists, 1.7 steals and 3.3 blocks per game, and was named to the All-NBA Second Team, and to the NBA All-Defensive First Team. In addition, Dale Ellis averaged 15.2 points per game and led the Spurs with 131 three-point field goals, while Willie Anderson provided the team with 11.9 points and 4.3 assists per game, and Vinny Del Negro contributed 10.0 points and 4.2 assists per game. Off the bench, Knight provided with 9.3 points and 3.1 assists per game, while J.R. Reid contributed 9.0 points per game, Terry Cummings averaged 7.3 points and 5.0 rebounds per game, and Rodman, who was the team's starting power forward, contributed 4.7 points and 17.3 rebounds per game, and was named to the NBA All-Defensive Second Team.

During the NBA All-Star weekend at the Target Center in Minneapolis, Minnesota, Robinson was selected for the 1994 NBA All-Star Game, as a member of the Western Conference All-Star team, while Ellis participated in the NBA Three-Point Shootout for the fifth time. Robinson finished in second place in Most Valuable Player voting, behind Hakeem Olajuwon of the Houston Rockets, while Rodman finished tied in eleventh place; Robinson also finished in second place in Defensive Player of the Year voting, also behind Olajuwon, with Rodman finishing in sixth place; Rodman also finished tied in sixth place in Sixth Man of the Year voting.

The Spurs finished second in the NBA in home-game attendance behind the Charlotte Hornets, with an attendance of 904,190 at the Alamodome during the regular season.

=== NBA playoffs ===
In the Western Conference First Round of the 1994 NBA playoffs, the Spurs faced off against the 5th–seeded Utah Jazz, who were led by the trio of All-Star forward Karl Malone, All-Star guard John Stockton, and Jeff Hornacek. The Spurs won Game 1 over the Jazz at home, 106–89 at the Alamodome, but then lost Game 2 at home, 96–84; in Game 2, Rodman had committed a flagrant foul on Stockton, and was suspended for Game 3. The Spurs lost Game 4 to the Jazz on the road, 95–90 at the Delta Center, thus losing the series in four games.

=== Notable highlights ===
Three notable highlights for the Spurs occurred during the regular season. On February 17, 1994, Robinson recorded a quadruple-double of 34 points, 10 rebounds, 10 assists and 10 blocks in a 115–96 home win over the Detroit Pistons at the Alamodome. On the final day of the regular season on April 24, Robinson scored a career-high of 71 points in a 112–97 road win over the Los Angeles Clippers at the Los Angeles Memorial Sports Arena. On March 19, Ellis became the first player in NBA history to reach 1,000 career three-point field-goals, as he hit his 1,000 three-pointer in a 107–100 home win over the Sacramento Kings.

=== Aftermath ===
Following the season, head coach John Lucas departed for a job as coach and General Manager for the Philadelphia 76ers, while Ellis signed as a free agent with the Denver Nuggets, Floyd re-signed with the New Jersey Nets, and Antoine Carr signed with the Utah Jazz.

== Draft picks ==
Round	Pick	Player	Position	Nationality	College
2	47	Chris Whitney	PG	United States	Clemson

== Roster ==
1993–94 San Antonio Spurs roster
Players

Pos.	No.	Player	Height	Weight	DOB	From
G	40	Willie Anderson	6 ft 7 in (2.01 m)	190 lb (86 kg)	1967–01–08	Georgia
F	35	Antoine Carr	6 ft 9 in (2.06 m)	225 lb (102 kg)	1961–07–23	Wichita State
F	34	Terry Cummings	6 ft 9 in (2.06 m)	220 lb (100 kg)	1961–03–15	DePaul
G	24	Lloyd Daniels	6 ft 7 in (2.01 m)	205 lb (93 kg)	1967–09–04	Mt. San Antonio
G	15	Vinny Del Negro	6 ft 4 in (1.93 m)	185 lb (84 kg)	1966–08–09	NC State
F	3	Dale Ellis	6 ft 7 in (2.01 m)	205 lb (93 kg)	1960–08–06	Tennessee
G	21	Sleepy Floyd	6 ft 3 in (1.91 m)	170 lb (77 kg)	1960–03–06	Georgetown
F	54	Jack Haley	6 ft 10 in (2.08 m)	240 lb (109 kg)	1964–01–27	UCLA
G	32	Negele Knight	6 ft 1 in (1.85 m)	175 lb (79 kg)	1967–03–06	Dayton
F	7	J. R. Reid	6 ft 9 in (2.06 m)	247 lb (112 kg)	1968–03–31	North Carolina
C	50	David Robinson	7 ft 1 in (2.16 m)	235 lb (107 kg)	1965–08–06	Navy
F	10	Dennis Rodman	6 ft 7 in (2.01 m)	210 lb (95 kg)	1961–05–13	SE Oklahoma State
G	20	Chris Whitney	6 ft 0 in (1.83 m)	168 lb (76 kg)	1971–10–05	Clemson

Coaches
Head coach
- John Lucas II
Assistant(s)
- Ron Adams
- George Gervin
- Tom Thibodeau

Legend
- (DP) Unsigned draft pick
- (FA) Free agent
- (S) Suspended
- Injured

Roster

== Regular season ==
=== Season standings ===
Midwest Division	W	L	PCT	GB	Home	Road	Div
y-Houston Rockets	58	24	.707	—	35–6	23–18	15–11
x-San Antonio Spurs	55	27	.671	3	32–9	23–18	16–10
x-Utah Jazz	53	29	.646	5	33–8	20–21	21–5
x-Denver Nuggets	42	40	.512	16	28–13	14–27	14–12
Minnesota Timberwolves	20	62	.244	38	13–28	7–34	5–21
Dallas Mavericks	13	69	.159	45	6–35	7–34	7–19

#	Western Conference				
#	Team	W	L	PCT	GB
1	z-Seattle SuperSonics	63	19	.768	–
2	y-Houston Rockets	58	24	.707	5
3	x-Phoenix Suns	56	26	.683	7
4	x-San Antonio Spurs	55	27	.671	8
5	x-Utah Jazz	53	29	.646	10
6	x-Golden State Warriors	50	32	.610	13
7	x-Portland Trail Blazers	47	35	.573	16
8	x-Denver Nuggets	42	40	.512	21
9	Los Angeles Lakers	33	49	.402	30
10	Sacramento Kings	28	54	.341	35
11	Los Angeles Clippers	27	55	.329	36
12	Minnesota Timberwolves	20	62	.244	43
13	Dallas Mavericks	13	69	.159	50

z – clinched division title
y – clinched division title
x – clinched playoff spot

== Playoffs ==
1994 playoff game log
First Round: 1–3 (home: 1–1; road: 0–2)

Game	Date	Team	Score	High points	High rebounds	High assists	Location Attendance	Series
1	April 28	Utah	W 106–89	David Robinson (25)	Dennis Rodman (11)	David Robinson (7)	Alamodome; 18,257	1–0
2	April 30	Utah	L 84–96	Negele Knight (16)	Dennis Rodman (17)	Vinny Del Negro (5)	Alamodome	1–1
3	May 3	@ Utah	L 72–105	Robinson, Carr (16)	Robinson, Cummings (11)	Del Negro, Knight (4)	Delta Center; 19,911	1–2
4	May 5	@ Utah	L 90–95	David Robinson (27)	Dennis Rodman (20)	Willie Anderson (7)	Delta Center; 19,911	1–3

1994 schedule

== Player statistics ==
=== Ragular season ===
Player	POS	GP	GS	MP	REB	AST	STL	BLK	PTS	MPG	RPG	APG	SPG	BPG	PPG
David Robinson	C	80	80	3,241	855	381	139	265	2,383	40.5	10.7	4.8	1.7	3.3	29.8
Willie Anderson	SG	80	79	2,488	242	347	71	46	955	31.1	3.0	4.3	.9	.6	11.9
Dennis Rodman	PF	79	51	2,989	1,367	184	52	32	370	37.8	17.3	2.3	.7	.4	4.7
Dale Ellis	SF	77	75	2,590	255	80	66	11	1,170	33.6	3.3	1.0	.9	.1	15.2
Vinny Del Negro	SG	77	56	1,949	161	320	64	1	773	25.3	2.1	4.2	.8	.0	10.0
J. R. Reid	PF	70	11	1,344	220	73	43	25	627	19.2	3.1	1.0	.6	.4	9.0
Lloyd Daniels	SG	65	5	980	111	94	29	16	370	15.1	1.7	1.4	.4	.2	5.7
Negele Knight^{†}	PG	64	18	1,430	103	197	34	10	593	22.3	1.6	3.1	.5	.2	9.3
Terry Cummings	PF	59	29	1,133	297	50	31	13	429	19.2	5.0	.8	.5	.2	7.3
Sleepy Floyd	PG	53	2	737	70	101	12	8	200	13.9	1.3	1.9	.2	.2	3.8
Chris Whitney	PG	40	4	339	29	53	11	1	72	8.5	.7	1.3	.3	.0	1.8
Antoine Carr	PF	34	0	465	51	15	9	22	198	13.7	1.5	.4	.3	.6	5.8
Jack Haley	PF	28	0	94	24	1	0	0	59	3.4	.9	.0	.0	.0	2.1
Chuck Nevitt	C	1	0	1	1	0	0	0	3	1.0	1.0	.0	.0	.0	3.0

- ^{†} Denotes player spent time with another team in the season. Stats reflect time with the Spurs only.

=== Playoffs ===
Player	POS	GP	GS	MP	REB	AST	STL	BLK	PTS	MPG	RPG	APG	SPG	BPG	PPG
David Robinson	C	4	4	146	40	14	3	10	80	36.5	10.0	3.5	.8	2.5	20.0
Dale Ellis	SF	4	4	114	10	1	3	0	42	28.5	2.5	.3	.8	.0	10.5
Willie Anderson	SG	4	4	106	8	12	5	2	33	26.5	2.0	3.0	1.3	.5	8.3
Vinny Del Negro	SG	4	4	93	7	18	1	0	29	23.3	1.8	4.5	.3	.0	7.3
Terry Cummings	PF	4	1	72	25	2	5	3	32	18.0	6.3	.5	1.3	.8	8.0
Negele Knight	PG	4	0	108	6	12	3	0	37	27.0	1.5	3.0	.8	.0	9.3
Lloyd Daniels	SG	4	0	66	9	3	0	1	22	16.5	2.3	.8	.0	.3	5.5
J. R. Reid	PF	4	0	56	12	3	1	2	15	14.0	3.0	.8	.3	.5	3.8
Sleepy Floyd	PG	4	0	37	1	1	0	0	6	9.3	.3	.3	.0	.0	1.5
Dennis Rodman	PF	3	3	114	48	2	6	4	25	38.0	16.0	.7	2.0	1.3	8.3
Antoine Carr	PF	3	0	37	1	3	1	2	18	12.3	.3	1.0	.3	.7	6.0
Jack Haley	PF	3	0	11	7	2	0	0	13	3.7	2.3	.7	.0	.0	4.3

== Awards and records ==
- David Robinson, NBA All-Star
- David Robinson, All-NBA Second Team
- David Robinson, NBA All-Defensive Second Team
- Dennis Rodman, NBA All-Defensive Second Team

== See also ==
- 1993–94 NBA season
