= 1993–94 Dallas Mavericks season =

NBA professional basketball team season

- Head coach: Quinn Buckner
- General manager: Norm Sonju
- Owner: Don Carter
- Arena: Reunion Arena

Results
- Record: 13–69 (.159)
- Place: Division: 6th (Midwest); Conference: 13th (Western)
- Playoff finish: Did not qualify
- Stats at Basketball Reference

Local media
- Television: KTVT; Home Sports Entertainment (Allen Stone, Bob Ortegel)
- Radio: WBAP (Allen Stone, Bob Ortegel)

The 1993–94 Dallas Mavericks season was the 14th season for the Dallas Mavericks in the National Basketball Association.

== Season summary ==
=== Off-season ===
After a dreadful season in which they only won just eleven games, the Mavericks received the fourth overall pick in the 1993 NBA draft, and selected small forward Jamal Mashburn from the University of Kentucky. During the off-season, the team acquired rookie power forward Popeye Jones out of Murray State University from the Houston Rockets, who drafted him with the 41st overall pick in the 1992 NBA draft, and started the regular season with new head coach Quinn Buckner, who was hired during the previous season.

=== Regular season ===
Under Buckner, and despite the addition of Mashburn, and with second-year star Jim Jackson playing in his first full season, the Mavericks' misery continued as they lost 23 of their first 24 games, including a 20-game losing streak between November and December, which tied the infamous 1972–73 Philadelphia 76ers; the record was later on broken by the 1995–96 Vancouver Grizzlies and the 1997–98 Denver Nuggets, where both teams lost 23 consecutive games, which was then later broken by the 2010–11 Cleveland Cavaliers and the 2013–14 Philadelphia 76ers, who lost 26 consecutive games. The Mavericks then suffered a 16-game losing streak (which led to a 2–39 record), on their way to a miserable 3–40 record at the end of January.

At mid-season, the team traded Derek Harper to the New York Knicks in exchange for Tony Campbell to replace Knicks point guard Doc Rivers, who played only 19 games due to a knee injury and missed the remainder of the season, and signed free agent Lorenzo Williams. The Mavericks held a 6–42 record at the All-Star break, and continued to struggle posting a 17-game losing streak between March and April, but posted a 5–8 record in April. The team won their final two games of the season, finishing in last place in the Midwest Division with a miserable 13–69 record, narrowly missing out on back-to-back 70-loss seasons.

Jackson averaged 19.2 points, 4.7 rebounds and 4.6 assists per game, while Mashburn averaged 19.2 points and 4.5 rebounds per game, and was named to the NBA All-Rookie First Team, and second-year center Sean Rooks provided the team with 11.4 points and 5.5 rebounds per game, but only played just 47 games due to injury. In addition, Campbell contributed 9.7 points per game in 41 games after the trade, while Doug Smith provided with 8.8 points and 4.4 rebounds per game, and Tim Legler contributed 8.3 points per game. Meanwhile, Fat Lever averaged 6.9 points and 2.0 steals per game, Jones averaged 5.8 points and 7.5 rebounds per game, rookie shooting guard, and second-round draft pick Lucious Harris contributed 5.4 points per game, and Williams provided with 3.2 points, 6.1 rebounds and 1.2 blocks per game in 34 games.

During the NBA All-Star weekend at the Target Center in Minneapolis, Minnesota, Mashburn and Jones were both selected for the inaugural NBA Rookie Game, as members of the Sensations team. Mashburn also finished in third place in Rookie of the Year voting. The Mavericks finished 25th in the NBA in home-game attendance, with an attendance of 526,414 at the Reunion Arena during the regular season, which was the third-lowest in the league.

=== Aftermath ===
Following the season, Buckner was fired as head coach after only one season with the Mavericks, while Rooks was traded to the Minnesota Timberwolves, Campbell signed as a free agent with the Cleveland Cavaliers, Legler was released to free agency, and Lever and Randy White both retired.

== Offseason ==
=== Draft picks ===
Round	Pick	Player	Position	Nationality	College
1	4	Jamal Mashburn	SF	United States	Kentucky
2	28	Lucious Harris	SG	United States	Long Beach State
2	33	Eric Riley	C	United States	Michigan

== Roster ==
1993–94 Dallas Mavericks roster
Players

Pos.	No.	Player	Height	Weight	DOB	From
F	19	Tony Campbell	6 ft 7 in (2.01 m)	215 lb (98 kg)	1962–05–07	Ohio State
F	43	Terry Davis	6 ft 9 in (2.06 m)	225 lb (102 kg)	1967–06–17	Virginia Union
C	40	Greg Dreiling	7 ft 1 in (2.16 m)	250 lb (113 kg)	1962–11–07	Kansas
G	30	Lucious Harris	6 ft 5 in (1.96 m)	190 lb (86 kg)	1970–12–18	Long Beach State
C	35	Donald Hodge	7 ft 0 in (2.13 m)	230 lb (104 kg)	1969–02–25	Temple
G	24	Jim Jackson	6 ft 6 in (1.98 m)	220 lb (100 kg)	1970–10–14	Ohio State
F	54	Popeye Jones	6 ft 8 in (2.03 m)	250 lb (113 kg)	1970–06–17	Murray State
G	23	Tim Legler	6 ft 4 in (1.93 m)	200 lb (91 kg)	1966–12–26	La Salle
G	21	Fat Lever	6 ft 3 in (1.91 m)	170 lb (77 kg)	1960–08–18	Arizona State
F	32	Jamal Mashburn	6 ft 8 in (2.03 m)	240 lb (109 kg)	1972–11–29	Kentucky
C	45	Sean Rooks	6 ft 10 in (2.08 m)	250 lb (113 kg)	1969–09–09	Arizona
F	34	Doug Smith	6 ft 10 in (2.08 m)	220 lb (100 kg)	1969–09–17	Missouri
F	52	Randy White (injured)	6 ft 8 in (2.03 m)	240 lb (109 kg)	1967–11–04	Louisiana Tech
G	20	Morlon Wiley	6 ft 4 in (1.93 m)	185 lb (84 kg)	1966–09–24	Long Beach State
F	44	Lorenzo Williams	6 ft 9 in (2.06 m)	200 lb (91 kg)	1969–07–15	Stetson

Coaches
Head coach
- Quinn Buckner
Assistant(s)
- Greg Ballard
- Tom Newell
- Randy Wittman
- Brad Davis

Legend
- (DP) Unsigned draft pick
- (FA) Free agent
- (S) Suspended
- (L) On leave from the team
- Injured

Roster
Updated: March 31, 1994

== Regular season ==
=== Season standings ===
Midwest Division	W	L	PCT	GB	Home	Road	Div
y-Houston Rockets	58	24	.707	—	35–6	23–18	15–11
x-San Antonio Spurs	55	27	.671	3	32–9	23–18	16–10
x-Utah Jazz	53	29	.646	5	33–8	20–21	21–5
x-Denver Nuggets	42	40	.512	16	28–13	14–27	14–12
Minnesota Timberwolves	20	62	.244	38	13–28	7–34	5–21
Dallas Mavericks	13	69	.159	45	6–35	7–34	7–19

#	Western Conference				
#	Team	W	L	PCT	GB
1	z-Seattle SuperSonics	63	19	.768	–
2	y-Houston Rockets	58	24	.707	5
3	x-Phoenix Suns	56	26	.683	7
4	x-San Antonio Spurs	55	27	.671	8
5	x-Utah Jazz	53	29	.646	10
6	x-Golden State Warriors	50	32	.610	13
7	x-Portland Trail Blazers	47	35	.573	16
8	x-Denver Nuggets	42	40	.512	21
9	Los Angeles Lakers	33	49	.402	30
10	Sacramento Kings	28	54	.341	35
11	Los Angeles Clippers	27	55	.329	36
12	Minnesota Timberwolves	20	62	.244	43
13	Dallas Mavericks	13	69	.159	50

z - clinched division title
y - clinched division title
x - clinched playoff spot

=== Game log ===
1993–94 game log
Total: 13–69 (Home: 0–0; Road: 0–0)
November: 0–0 (home: 0–0; road: 0–0)

Game	Date	Team	Score	High points	High rebounds	High assists	Location Attendance	Record

December: 0–0 (home: 0–0; road: 0–0)

Game	Date	Team	Score	High points	High rebounds	High assists	Location Attendance	Record

January: 0–0 (home: 0–0; road: 0–0)

Game	Date	Team	Score	High points	High rebounds	High assists	Location Attendance	Record

February: 0–0 (home: 0–0; road: 0–0)

Game	Date	Team	Score	High points	High rebounds	High assists	Location Attendance	Record

March: 0–0 (home: 0–0; road: 0–0)

Game	Date	Team	Score	High points	High rebounds	High assists	Location Attendance	Record

April: 0–0 (home: 0–0; road: 0–0)

Game	Date	Team	Score	High points	High rebounds	High assists	Location Attendance	Record

1993–94 schedule

== Player statistics ==
=== Ragular season ===
Player	POS	GP	GS	MP	REB	AST	STL	BLK	PTS	MPG	RPG	APG	SPG	BPG	PPG
Jim Jackson	SG	82	82	3,066	388	374	87	25	1,576	37.4	4.7	4.6	1.1	.3	19.2
Fat Lever	PG	81	54	1,947	283	213	159	15	555	24.0	3.5	2.6	2.0	.2	6.9
Popeye Jones	PF	81	47	1,773	605	99	61	31	468	21.9	7.5	1.2	.8	.4	5.8
Jamal Mashburn	SF	79	73	2,896	353	266	89	14	1,513	36.7	4.5	3.4	1.1	.2	19.2
Doug Smith	PF	79	42	1,684	349	119	82	38	698	21.3	4.4	1.5	1.0	.5	8.8
Tim Legler	SG	79	0	1,322	128	120	52	13	656	16.7	1.6	1.5	.7	.2	8.3
Lucious Harris	SG	77	0	1,165	157	106	49	10	418	15.1	2.0	1.4	.6	.1	5.4
Greg Dreiling	C	54	19	685	170	31	16	24	132	12.7	3.1	.6	.3	.4	2.4
Donald Hodge	C	50	0	428	95	32	15	13	136	8.6	1.9	.6	.3	.3	2.7
Sean Rooks	C	47	28	1,255	259	49	21	44	536	26.7	5.5	1.0	.4	.9	11.4
Tony Campbell^{†}	SF	41	3	835	126	51	30	14	398	20.4	3.1	1.2	.7	.3	9.7
Lorenzo Williams^{†}	PF	34	11	678	209	23	15	41	108	19.9	6.1	.7	.4	1.2	3.2
Derek Harper^{†}	PG	28	28	893	55	98	45	4	325	31.9	2.0	3.5	1.6	.1	11.6
Darren Morningstar^{†}	C	22	15	363	80	15	14	2	94	16.5	3.6	.7	.6	.1	4.3
Randy White	PF	18	3	320	83	11	10	10	115	17.8	4.6	.6	.6	.6	6.4
Terry Davis	PF	15	5	286	74	6	9	1	56	19.1	4.9	.4	.6	.1	3.7
Morlon Wiley^{†}	PG	12	0	124	6	16	13	0	14	10.3	.5	1.3	1.1	.0	1.2
Chucky Brown	SF	1	0	10	1	0	0	0	3	10.0	1.0	.0	.0	.0	3.0

- ^{†} Denotes player spent time with another team in the season. Stats reflect time with the Mavericks only.

== Awards and records ==
- Jamal Mashburn, NBA All-Rookie Team 1st Team

== See also ==
- 1993-94 NBA season
