= Bob Martin (basketball) =

American basketball player

Personal information
- Born: October 7, 1969 (age 57) Minneapolis, Minnesota
- Listed height: 7 ft 0 in (2.13 m)
- Listed weight: 250 lb (113 kg)

Career information
- High school: Apple Valley (Apple Valley, Minnesota)
- College: Minnesota (1988–1992)
- NBA draft: 1992: undrafted
- Position: Center
- Number: 42

Career history
- 1993–1994: Los Angeles Clippers
- Stats at NBA.com
- Stats at Basketball Reference

Robert W. Martin (born October 7, 1969, in Minneapolis, Minnesota) is an American professional basketball player, formerly in the NBA.

Martin, a 7'0" center from the University of Minnesota, played 53 games with the Los Angeles Clippers in 1993-94 and one game in 1994-95, averaging 2.1 points and 2.2 rebounds overall.
