= Trevor Wilson (basketball) =

American basketball player (born 1968)

Personal information
- Born: March 16, 1968 (age 58) Los Angeles, California, U.S.
- Listed height: 6 ft 7 in (2.01 m)
- Listed weight: 210 lb (95 kg)

Career information
- High school: Cleveland (Los Angeles, California)
- College: UCLA (1986–1990)
- NBA draft: 1990: 2nd round, 36th overall pick
- Drafted by: Atlanta Hawks
- Playing career: 1990–1999
- Position: Small forward
- Number: 44, 7, 21, 30

Career history
- 1990–1991: Atlanta Hawks
- 1991: Glaxo Verona
- 1991–1993: OAR Ferrol
- 1993: Los Angeles Lakers
- 1993–1995: Sacramento Kings
- 1995: Somontano Huesca
- 1995: Olympique Antibes
- 1995: Philadelphia 76ers
- 1996: Chicago Rockers
- 1996–1997: Sioux Falls Skyforce
- 1997–1998: Aisin Seahorses
- 1998: Caja Cantabria
- 1998–1999: Türk Telekom Ankara

Career highlights
- CBA champion (1996); 3× First-team All-Pac-10 (1988–1990); Third-team Parade All-American (1985)

Career NBA statistics
- Points: 591 (5.7 ppg)
- Rebounds: 353 (3.4 rpg)
- Assists: 99 (1.0 apg)
- Stats at NBA.com
- Stats at Basketball Reference

Trevor Wilson (born March 16, 1968) is an American former professional basketball player. A 6-foot-7-inch (201 cm), 210-pound (95 kg) forward, he played college basketball for the UCLA Bruins. Wilson played professionally in the National Basketball Association (NBA) from 1990 to 1995 with the Atlanta Hawks, Los Angeles Lakers, Sacramento Kings and Philadelphia 76ers.

In 1990, his finished his college career with UCLA ranked third on the school's career scoring list, fourth in rebounding, and sixth in assists and steals.

Wilson won a Continental Basketball Association (CBA) championship with the Sioux Falls Skyforce in 1996.

After his retirement from basketball, Wilson became a police officer with the Los Angeles Police Department.
