= 1994 NBA All-Star Game =

Exhibition basketball game

	1	2	3	4	Total
East	33	39	29	26	127
West	28	36	26	28	118
- Date: February 13, 1994
- Arena: Target Center
- City: Minneapolis
- MVP: Scottie Pippen
- National anthem: Tracie Spencer
- Attendance: 17,096
- Network: NBC; TNT (All-Star Saturday)
- Announcers: Dick Enberg, Steve Jones and Magic Johnson; Bob Neal, Doug Collins and Hubie Brown (All-Star Saturday)
West	East

NBA All-Star Game
< 1993	1995 >

The 1994 NBA All-Star Game was an exhibition basketball game played on February 13, 1994, at the Target Center in Minneapolis, home of the Minnesota Timberwolves; the Timberwolves however, did not have any players participating in the game. It was the 44th edition of the National Basketball Association (NBA) All-Star Game, held during the 1993–94 NBA season. It was broadcast by NBC for the fourth consecutive year. It was the first and only All-Star Game to be held in Minneapolis to date.

The 1993–94 season was Scottie Pippen's first season as the leader of the Chicago Bulls following the first retirement of Michael Jordan, and this All-Star Game turned out to be Pippen's peak shining moment, as he led the way with 29 points, 11 rebounds, and four steals en route to a 127–118 victory for his East All-Stars team while also being voted as the game's MVP.

In this game, Kenny Anderson and Derrick Coleman became the first players in the history of the New Jersey Nets to start in an All-Star Game.

== Coaches ==
The Eastern All-Stars were coached by Lenny Wilkens, the head coach of the Eastern Conference leader Atlanta Hawks. The Western All-Stars were coached by George Karl, the head coach of the Western Conference leader Seattle SuperSonics.

== Roster ==
Eastern Conference All-Stars
Pos	Player	Team	No. of selections	Votes
Starters
G	B. J. Armstrong	Chicago Bulls	1st	529,065
G	Kenny Anderson	New Jersey Nets	1st	493,690
F	Scottie Pippen	Chicago Bulls	4th	496,506
F	Derrick Coleman	New Jersey Nets	1st	482,261
C	Shaquille O'Neal	Orlando Magic	2nd	603,346
Reserves
G	Mookie Blaylock	Atlanta Hawks	1st	390,433
C	Patrick Ewing	New York Knicks	8th	427,216
F	Horace Grant	Chicago Bulls	1st	—
C	Alonzo Mourning^{INJ}	Charlotte Hornets	1st	379,998
F	Charles Oakley^{REP}	New York Knicks	1st	—
G	Mark Price	Cleveland Cavaliers	4th	423,179
G	John Starks	New York Knicks	1st	—
F	Dominique Wilkins	Atlanta Hawks	9th	358,501
Head coach: Lenny Wilkens (Atlanta Hawks)

Western Conference All-Stars
Pos	Player	Team	No. of selections	Votes
Starters
G	Mitch Richmond	Sacramento Kings	2nd	469,978
G	Clyde Drexler	Portland Trail Blazers	8th	493,204
F	Charles Barkley^{INJ}	Phoenix Suns	8th	794,936
F	Shawn Kemp	Seattle SuperSonics	2nd	461,880
C	Hakeem Olajuwon	Houston Rockets	9th	478,018
Reserves
G	Kevin Johnson	Phoenix Suns	3rd	431,885
F	Karl Malone	Utah Jazz	7th	322,450
F	Danny Manning	Los Angeles Clippers	2nd	—
G	Gary Payton^{REP}	Seattle SuperSonics	1st	316,720
F	Clifford Robinson	Portland Trail Blazers	1st	—
C	David Robinson	San Antonio Spurs	5th	350,873
G	Latrell Sprewell	Golden State Warriors	1st	—
G	John Stockton	Utah Jazz	6th	367,605
Head coach: George Karl (Seattle SuperSonics)

^INJ Alonzo Mourning and Charles Barkley did not participate due to injury. Karl Malone replaced Barkley in the West starting lineup.
^REP Charles Oakley and Gary Payton replaced Alonzo Mourning and Charles Barkley, respectively.
