= 1993–94 Detroit Pistons season =

NBA team season

- Head coach: Don Chaney
- Owners: William Davidson
- Arena: The Palace of Auburn Hills

Results
- Record: 20–62 (.244)
- Place: Division: 6th (Central); Conference: 14th (Eastern)
- Playoff finish: Did not qualify
- Stats at Basketball Reference

Local media
- Television: WKBD-TV; PASS Sports
- Radio: WWJ

The 1993–94 Detroit Pistons season was the 46th season for the Detroit Pistons in the National Basketball Association, and their 37th season in Detroit, Michigan.

== Season summary ==
=== Off-season ===
In the 1993 NBA draft, the Pistons selected point guard Lindsey Hunter out of Jackson State University with the tenth overall pick, and also selected shooting guard Allan Houston from the University of Tennessee with the eleventh overall pick. During the off-season, the team acquired All-Star forward Sean Elliott from the San Antonio Spurs, signed free agent Greg Anderson, and hired Don Chaney as their new head coach. Early into the regular season, the Pistons traded Alvin Robertson, who was out due to a back injury, to the Denver Nuggets in exchange for Mark Macon and Marcus Liberty.

=== Regular season ===
After only playing just eleven games early into the regular season, Bill Laimbeer retired after an altercation with his teammate Isiah Thomas during a team practice, in which Thomas broke his hand after punching Laimbeer; Laimbeer averaged 9.8 points and 5.1 rebounds per game this season. Under Chaney and with the addition of Elliott, Hunter, Houston and Anderson, the Pistons got off to a 5–4 start to the season, but then struggled and suffered a 14-game losing streak between December and January, and later on held an 11–37 record at the All-Star break. At mid-season, the team traded Olden Polynice to the Sacramento Kings in exchange for Pete Chilcutt, and signed free agent Charles Jones. The Pistons lost their final 13 games of the regular season, finishing tied for last place in the Central Division with an awful 20–62 record, their worst record since the 1979–80 season.

Joe Dumars averaged 20.4 points and 3.8 assists per game, and led the Pistons with 124 three-point field goals, while Terry Mills averaged 17.3 points and 8.4 rebounds per game, and Thomas provided the team with 14.8 points and 6.9 assists per game. In addition, Elliott contributed 12.1 points per game, while Hunter provided with 10.3 points, 4.8 assists and 1.5 steals per game, and was named the NBA All-Rookie Second Team, Houston contributed 8.5 points per game off the bench, Anderson averaged 6.4 points and 7.4 rebounds per game, and Jones provided with 2.2 points, 5.6 rebounds and 1.0 blocks per game off the bench in 42 games.

During the NBA All-Star weekend at the Target Center in Minneapolis, Minnesota, Hunter was selected for the inaugural NBA Rookie Game, as a member of the Phenoms team, while Houston participated in the NBA Slam Dunk Contest. The Pistons finished fifth in the NBA in home-game attendance, with an attendance of 806,641 at The Palace of Auburn Hills during the regular season.

=== Aftermath ===
This season marked an end of an era as Thomas retired, ending his thirteen-year career in the NBA with the Pistons. Thomas played in his final game in a 132–104 home loss to the Orlando Magic, at The Palace of Auburn Hills on April 19, 1994, where he ruptured his Achilles tendon, which forced him to retire. Also following the season, Elliott was traded back to his former team, the San Antonio Spurs after only one season with the Pistons, while Anderson signed with the Atlanta Hawks, Chilcutt signed with the Houston Rockets, and Jones briefly retired.

== Draft picks ==
| Round | Pick | Player | Position | Nationality | College |
|---|---|---|---|---|---|
| 1 | 10 | Lindsey Hunter | PG | United States | Jackson State |
| 1 | 11 | Allan Houston | SG | United States | Tennessee |

== Roster ==
1993–94 Detroit Pistons roster
Players

| Pos. | No. | Player | Height | Weight | DOB | From |
|---|---|---|---|---|---|---|
| F/C | 33 | Greg Anderson | 6 ft 10 in (2.08 m) | 230 lb (104 kg) | 1964–06–22 | Houston |
| F | 34 | Pete Chilcutt | 6 ft 10 in (2.08 m) | 230 lb (104 kg) | 1968–09–14 | North Carolina |
| F | 51 | Ben Coleman | 6 ft 9 in (2.06 m) | 235 lb (107 kg) | 1961–11–14 | Maryland |
| G | 4 | Joe Dumars | 6 ft 3 in (1.91 m) | 190 lb (86 kg) | 1963–05–24 | McNeese State |
| F | 32 | Sean Elliott | 6 ft 8 in (2.03 m) | 205 lb (93 kg) | 1968–02–02 | Arizona |
| G | 20 | Allan Houston | 6 ft 6 in (1.98 m) | 200 lb (91 kg) | 1971–04–20 | Tennessee |
| G | 1 | Lindsey Hunter | 6 ft 2 in (1.88 m) | 170 lb (77 kg) | 1970–12–03 | Jackson State |
| F/C | 23 | Charles Jones | 6 ft 9 in (2.06 m) | 215 lb (98 kg) | 1957–04–03 | Albany State |
| C | 40 | Bill Laimbeer | 6 ft 11 in (2.11 m) | 245 lb (111 kg) | 1957–05–19 | Notre Dame |
| F | 30 | Marcus Liberty | 6 ft 8 in (2.03 m) | 205 lb (93 kg) | 1968–10–27 | Illinois |
| G | 2 | Mark Macon | 6 ft 4 in (1.93 m) | 185 lb (84 kg) | 1969–04–14 | Temple |
| F | 6 | Terry Mills | 6 ft 10 in (2.08 m) | 230 lb (104 kg) | 1967–12–21 | Michigan |
| G | 23 | Tracy Moore | 6 ft 4 in (1.93 m) | 200 lb (91 kg) | 1965–12–28 | Tulsa |
| G | 11 | Isiah Thomas (injured) | 6 ft 1 in (1.85 m) | 180 lb (82 kg) | 1961–04–30 | Indiana |
| F | 12 | David Wood | 6 ft 9 in (2.06 m) | 227 lb (103 kg) | 1964–11–30 | Nevada |

Coaches
Head coach
- Don Chaney
Assistant(s)
- K. C. Jones
- Brendan Malone
- Walt Perrin

Legend
- (DP) Unsigned draft pick
- (FA) Free agent
- (S) Suspended
- Injured

=== Roster Notes ===
- Center Bill Laimbeer retired on December 1, 1993.

== Regular season ==
=== Season standings ===
| Central Division | W | L | PCT | GB | Home | Road | Div |
|---|---|---|---|---|---|---|---|
| y-Atlanta Hawks | 57 | 25 | .695 | – | 36–5 | 21–20 | 21–7 |
| x-Chicago Bulls | 55 | 27 | .671 | 2 | 31–10 | 24–17 | 21–7 |
| x-Indiana Pacers | 47 | 35 | .573 | 10 | 29–12 | 18–23 | 15–13 |
| x-Cleveland Cavaliers | 47 | 35 | .573 | 10 | 31–10 | 16–25 | 16–12 |
| Charlotte Hornets | 41 | 41 | .500 | 16 | 28–13 | 13–28 | 12–16 |
| Detroit Pistons | 20 | 62 | .244 | 37 | 10–31 | 10–31 | 4–24 |
| Milwaukee Bucks | 20 | 62 | .244 | 37 | 11–30 | 9–32 | 9–19 |

| # | Eastern Conference | | | | |
| # | Team | W | L | PCT | GB |
|---|---|---|---|---|---|
| 1 | c-Atlanta Hawks | 57 | 25 | .695 | – |
| 2 | y-New York Knicks | 57 | 25 | .695 | – |
| 3 | x-Chicago Bulls | 55 | 27 | .671 | 2 |
| 4 | x-Orlando Magic | 50 | 32 | .610 | 7 |
| 5 | x-Indiana Pacers | 47 | 35 | .573 | 10 |
| 6 | x-Cleveland Cavaliers | 47 | 35 | .573 | 10 |
| 7 | x-New Jersey Nets | 45 | 37 | .549 | 12 |
| 8 | x-Miami Heat | 42 | 40 | .512 | 15 |
| 9 | Charlotte Hornets | 41 | 41 | .500 | 16 |
| 10 | Boston Celtics | 32 | 50 | .390 | 25 |
| 11 | Philadelphia 76ers | 25 | 57 | .305 | 32 |
| 12 | Washington Bullets | 24 | 58 | .293 | 33 |
| 13 | Milwaukee Bucks | 20 | 62 | .244 | 37 |
| 14 | Detroit Pistons | 20 | 62 | .244 | 37 |

z - clinched division title
y - clinched division title
x - clinched playoff spot

=== Game log ===
1993–94 game log
Total: 20-62 (Home: 10–31; Road: 10–31)
November: 5–8 (home: 4–3; road: 1–5)

| Game | Date | Team | Score | High points | High rebounds | High assists | Location Attendance | Record |
|---|---|---|---|---|---|---|---|---|
| 1 | November 5 | Minnesota | W 104–99 | Isiah Thomas (26) | Olden Polynice (14) | Isiah Thomas (10) | The Palace of Auburn Hills; 21,454 | 1–0 |
| 2 | November 6 | @ Indiana | W 113–107 | Joe Dumars (27) | Bill Laimbeer, Olden Polynice (9) | Isiah Thomas (10) | Market Square Arena; 14,331 | 2–0 |
| 3 | November 9 | Washington | L 112–118 | Sean Elliott (27) | Olden Polynice (15) | Isiah Thomas (16) | The Palace of Auburn Hills; 21,454 | 2–1 |
| 4 | November 11 | @ L.A. Clippers | L 99–111 | Terry Mills (18) | Olden Polynice (13) | Isiah Thomas (6) | Los Angeles Memorial Sports Arena; 9,021 | 2–2 |
| 5 | November 12 | @ Utah | L 89–109 | Olden Polynice (17) | Olden Polynice (18) | Isiah Thomas (8) | Delta Center; 19,911 | 2–3 |
| 6 | November 14 | @ Portland | L 111–114 | Sean Elliott (27) | Olden Polynice (13) | Isiah Thomas (12) | Memorial Coliseum; 12,888 | 2–4 |
| 7 | November 17 | Orlando | W 98–92 | Bill Laimbeer (26) | Olden Polynice (10) | Joe Dumars (8) | The Palace of Auburn Hills; 21,454 | 3–4 |
| 8 | November 19 | San Antonio | W 95–86 | Joe Dumars (24) | Terry Mills (15) | Lindsey Hunter (6) | The Palace of Auburn Hills; 21,454 | 4–4 |
| 9 | November 21 | Philadelphia | W 103–89 | Bill Laimbeer (25) | Terry Mills (8) | Joe Dumars (9) | The Palace of Auburn Hills; 21,454 | 5–4 |
| 10 | November 24 | Boston | L 103–118 | Olden Polynice (27) | Olden Polynice (13) | Lindsey Hunter, Joe Dumars (7) | The Palace of Auburn Hills; 21,454 | 5–5 |
| 11 | November 27 | @ New York | L 85–112 | Lindsey Hunter (14) | Olden Polynice, Terry Mills (9) | Bill Laimbeer (6) | Madison Square Garden; 19,763 | 5–6 |
| 12 | November 28 | Golden State | L 88–91 | Lindsey Hunter, Sean Elliott (20) | Olden Polynice (11) | Lindsey Hunter (8) | The Palace of Auburn Hills; 21,454 | 5–7 |
| 13 | November 30 | @ Cleveland | L 74–92 | Olden Polynice, Terry Mills, Sean Elliott (12) | Olden Polynice (16) | Mark Macon (7) | Richfield Coliseum; 16,365 | 5–8 |

December: 3–11 (home: 1–7; road: 2–4)

| Game | Date | Team | Score | High points | High rebounds | High assists | Location Attendance | Record |
|---|---|---|---|---|---|---|---|---|
| 14 | December 2 | Phoenix | L 101–102 | Terry Mills (33) | Olden Polynice (13) | Isiah Thomas (13) | The Palace of Auburn Hills; 21,454 | 5–9 |
| 15 | December 7 | @ Orlando | L 89–91 | Joe Dumars (28) | Olden Polynice (16) | Isiah Thomas (10) | Orlando Arena; 15,291 | 5–10 |
| 16 | December 8 | Atlanta | L 97–105 | Joe Dumars (29) | Olden Polynice (25) | Isiah Thomas (12) | The Palace of Auburn Hills; 21,454 | 5–11 |
| 17 | December 10 | Milwaukee | L 88–90 | Olden Polynice (25) | Olden Polynice (15) | Isiah Thomas (14) | The Palace of Auburn Hills; 21,454 | 5–12 |
| 18 | December 11 | @ Minnesota | W 92–80 | Joe Dumars (22) | Terry Mills, Olden Polynice (14) | Isiah Thomas (8) | Target Center; 18,397 | 6–12 |
| 19 | December 14 | L.A. Lakers | L 93–99 | Joe Dumars (21) | Olden Polynice (22) | Lindsey Hunter (7) | The Palace of Auburn Hills; 20,236 | 6–13 |
| 20 | December 16 | @ Washington | W 97–95 | Joe Dumars (27) | Terry Mills (17) | Lindsey Hunter (7) | USAir Arena; 8,143 | 7–13 |
| 21 | December 18 | Cleveland | W 98–92 (OT) | Terry Mills (25) | Olden Polynice (18) | Isiah Thomas (7) | The Palace of Auburn Hills; 20,155 | 8–13 |
| 22 | December 20 | @ Philadelphia | L 92–121 | Terry Mills (16) | Cadillac Anderson (8) | Lindsey Hunter, Mark Macon, Isiah Thomas, Terry Mills (3) | The Spectrum; 8,109 | 8–14 |
| 23 | December 21 | Charlotte | L 97–108 | Lindsey Hunter (20) | Olden Polynice (12) | Terry Mills (6) | The Palace of Auburn Hills; 21,454 | 8–15 |
| 24 | December 23 | Chicago | L 72–81 | Lindsey Hunter (21) | Olden Polynice (10) | Sean Elliott, Lindsey Hunter (5) | The Palace of Auburn Hills; 21,454 | 8–16 |
| 25 | December 27 | @ Charlotte | L 94–109 | Terry Mills (26) | Olden Polynice (14) | Lindsey Hunter (10) | Charlotte Coliseum; 23,698 | 8–17 |
| 26 | December 28 | @ Atlanta | L 101–119 | Joe Dumars (17) | Terry Mills (10) | Mark Macon (6) | The Omni; 15,981 | 8–18 |
| 27 | December 30 | Sacramento | L 91–97 | Terry Mills (22) | Olden Polynice (13) | Sean Elliott, Joe Dumars (5) | The Palace of Auburn Hills; 19,399 | 8–19 |

January: 1–14 (home: 0–7; road: 1–7)

| Game | Date | Team | Score | High points | High rebounds | High assists | Location Attendance | Record |
|---|---|---|---|---|---|---|---|---|
| 28 | January 2 | Miami | L 85–93 | Joe Dumars (24) | Olden Polynice (16) | Lindsey Hunter, Joe Dumars (5) | The Palace of Auburn Hills; 19,274 | 8–20 |
| 29 | January 4 | @ Chicago | L 91–97 | Lindsey Hunter (29) | Olden Polynice, Sean Elliott (11) | Joe Dumars (8) | Chicago Stadium; 18,676 | 8–21 |
| 30 | January 8 | Indiana | L 92–101 | Sean Elliott (26) | Olden Polynice (15) | Lindsey Hunter (7) | The Palace of Auburn Hills; 19,878 | 8–22 |
| 31 | January 11 | Denver | L 86–94 | Joe Dumars (18) | Olden Polynice (16) | Lindsey Hunter, Isiah Thomas (6) | The Palace of Auburn Hills; 17,685 | 8–23 |
| 32 | January 13 | New York | L 80–94 | Isiah Thomas (21) | Terry Mills (15) | Isiah Thomas (9) | The Palace of Auburn Hills; 19,431 | 8–24 |
| 33 | January 15 | @ New York | L 88–97 | Terry Mills (21) | Cadillac Anderson (15) | Isiah Thomas (6) | Madison Square Garden; 19,763 | 8–25 |
| 34 | January 17 | Utah | L 94–109 | Cadillac Anderson (23) | Cadillac Anderson (16) | Allan Houston (5) | The Palace of Auburn Hills; 19,137 | 8–26 |
| 35 | January 18 | @ Milwaukee | L 91–123 | Allan Houston (19) | Cadillac Anderson (11) | Isiah Thomas (9) | Bradley Center; 12,879 | 8–27 |
| 36 | January 21 | @ Miami | W 118–98 | Joe Dumars (35) | Cadillac Anderson, Ben Coleman (8) | Isiah Thomas (14) | Miami Arena; 14,925 | 9–27 |
| 37 | January 22 | @ Washington | L 93–98 | Joe Dumars (25) | Cadillac Anderson (14) | Isiah Thomas (8) | Baltimore Arena; 12,756 | 9–28 |
| 38 | January 24 | Chicago | L 86–92 | Joe Dumars (25) | Cadillac Anderson (16) | Isiah Thomas (9) | The Palace of Auburn Hills; 20,249 | 9–29 |
| 39 | January 26 | @ Golden State | L 92–108 | Joe Dumars (32) | Cadillac Anderson (17) | Isiah Thomas (5) | Oakland-Alameda County Coliseum Arena; 15,025 | 9–30 |
| 40 | January 28 | @ L.A. Lakers | L 97–105 | Isiah Thomas (31) | Cadillac Anderson (11) | Joe Dumars (6) | Great Western Forum; 13,235 | 9–31 |
| 41 | January 29 | @ Denver | L 110–128 | Joe Dumars (31) | Cadillac Anderson (10) | Lindsey Hunter (3) | McNichols Sports Arena; 17,171 | 9–32 |
| 42 | January 31 | Cleveland | L 103–107 | Joe Dumars (29) | Cadillac Anderson (14) | Terry Mills (5) | The Palace of Auburn Hills; 18,553 | 9–33 |

February: 4–8 (home: 2–5; road: 2–3)

| Game | Date | Team | Score | High points | High rebounds | High assists | Location Attendance | Record |
|---|---|---|---|---|---|---|---|---|
| 43 | February 2 | Milwaukee | W 104–90 | Allan Houston (28) | Terry Mills (17) | Lindsey Hunter (10) | The Palace of Auburn Hills; 17,156 | 10–33 |
| 44 | February 4 | Seattle | L 84–108 | Joe Dumars (30) | Cadillac Anderson, Charles Jones (10) | Lindsey Hunter (5) | The Palace of Auburn Hills; 21,454 | 10–34 |
| 45 | February 5 | New Jersey | L 100–107 | Joe Dumars (42) | Cadillac Anderson (12) | Isiah Thomas, Lindsey Hunter (4) | The Palace of Auburn Hills; 21,454 | 10–35 |
| 46 | February 7 | @ Atlanta | L 97–141 | Allan Houston (22) | Terry Mills, Marcus Liberty (8) | Allan Houston, Isiah Thomas (3) | The Omni; 9,324 | 10–36 |
| 47 | February 9 | @ Boston | W 102–95 | Isiah Thomas (28) | Olden Polynice (11) | Isiah Thomas (9) | Boston Garden; 14,890 | 11–36 |
| 48 | February 10 | Houston | L 81–104 | Allan Houston (19) | David Wood (10) | Isiah Thomas (7) | The Palace of Auburn Hills; 17,135 | 11–37 |
All-Star Break
| 49 | February 15 | Washington | W 100–93 | Joe Dumars (25) | Charles Jones (11) | Isiah Thomas (9) | The Palace of Auburn Hills; 16,874 | 12–37 |
| 50 | February 17 | @ San Antonio | L 96–115 | Lindsey Hunter (26) | Terry Mills (16) | Terry Mills, Lindsey Hunter, Sean Elliott, Allan Houston (2) | Alamodome; 19,451 | 12–38 |
| 51 | February 19 | @ Dallas | W 105–96 | Joe Dumars (40) | Cadillac Anderson (17) | Lindsey Hunter (4) | Reunion Arena; 16,102 | 13–38 |
| 52 | February 21 | Dallas | L 88–98 | Terry Mills (25) | Terry Mills (13) | Terry Mills (13), Joe Dumars (6) | The Palace of Auburn Hills; 16,427 | 13–39 |
| 53 | February 25 | @ Indiana | L 90–110 | Isiah Thomas (29) | Cadillac Anderson (10) | Lindsey Hunter (5) | Market Square Arena; 11,932 | 13–40 |
| 54 | February 26 | Miami | L 100–105 | Isiah Thomas (24) | Terry Mills (12) | Isiah Thomas (6) | The Palace of Auburn Hills; 21,454 | 13–41 |

March: 7–8 (home: 3–4; road: 4–4)

| Game | Date | Team | Score | High points | High rebounds | High assists | Location Attendance | Record |
|---|---|---|---|---|---|---|---|---|
| 55 | March 1 | @ New Jersey | L 98–108 | Joe Dumars (19) | Cadillac Anderson (9) | Isiah Thomas (14) | Brendan Byrne Arena; 14,134 | 13–42 |
| 56 | March 2 | Portland | L 107–131 | Terry Mills (30) | Terry Mills (9) | Isiah Thomas (10) | The Palace of Auburn Hills; 17,256 | 13–43 |
| 57 | March 5 | @ Milwaukee | L 108–117 | Joe Dumars (42) | Pete Chilcutt (13) | Isiah Thomas (10) | Bradley Center; 16,942 | 13–44 |
| 58 | March 7 | New York | L 85–99 | Joe Dumars (21) | Cadillac Anderson, Charles Jones (9) | Isiah Thomas (7) | The Palace of Auburn Hills; 17,388 | 13–45 |
| 59 | March 9 | New Jersey | W 114–97 | Joe Dumars (44) | Terry Mills (13) | Lindsey Hunter (15) | The Palace of Auburn Hills; 16,247 | 14–45 |
| 60 | March 11 | Cleveland | W 98–96 | Joe Dumars (31) | Cadillac Anderson (15) | Joe Dumars (11) | The Palace of Auburn Hills; 20,269 | 15–45 |
| 61 | March 12 | Atlanta | L 104–92 | Joe Dumars (32) | Terry Mills (10) | Lindsey Hunter, Isiah Thomas (7) | The Palace of Auburn Hills; 21,454 | 15–46 |
| 62 | March 14 | @ Sacramento | W 108–102 | Isiah Thomas (22) | Pete Chilcutt (12) | Joe Dumars, Lindsey Hunter (6) | ARCO Arena; 17,317 | 16–46 |
| 63 | March 15 | @ Seattle | W 89–87 | Isiah Thomas (20) | Terry Mills (11) | Terry Mills, Sean Elliott, Joe Dumars, Lindsey Hunter (4) | Seattle Center Coliseum; 14,679 | 17–46 |
| 64 | March 18 | @ Phoenix | W 114–113 | Joe Dumars (30) | Cadillac Anderson (9) | Isiah Thomas (13) | America West Arena; 19,023 | 18–46 |
| 65 | March 19 | @ Houston | L 88–106 | Joe Dumars (20) | Charles Jones (10) | Isiah Thomas (7) | The Summit; 15,512 | 18–47 |
| 66 | March 23 | L.A. Clippers | W 111–107 | Terry Mills (21) | Terry Mills (14) | Lindsey Hunter (13) | The Palace of Auburn Hills; 17,826 | 19–47 |
| 67 | March 25 | Charlotte | L 92–106 | Isiah Thomas (19) | Cadillac Anderson (8) | Lindsey Hunter (7) | The Palace of Auburn Hills; 21,454 | 19–48 |
| 68 | March 27 | @ Cleveland | L 99–111 | Joe Dumars (22) | Terry Mills, Cadillac Anderson (8) | Isiah Thomas (10) | Richfield Coliseum; 19,065 | 19–49 |
| 69 | March 29 | @ Miami | W 123–115 | Joe Dumars (30) | Cadillac Anderson (10) | Lindsey Hunter (6) | Miami Arena; 14,938 | 20–49 |

April: 0–13 (home: 0–5; road: 0–8)

| Game | Date | Team | Score | High points | High rebounds | High assists | Location Attendance | Record |
|---|---|---|---|---|---|---|---|---|
| 70 | April 1 | @ Chicago | L 95–102 | Sean Elliott (26) | Cadillac Anderson (10) | Isiah Thomas (9) | Chicago Stadium; 18,676 | 20–50 |
| 71 | April 3 | Chicago | L 93–96 | Isiah Thomas (17) | Cadillac Anderson (15) | Lindsey Hunter (8) | The Palace Of Auburn Hills; 19,151 | 20–51 |
| 72 | April 5 | @ Indiana | L 89–105 | Terry Mills (20) | Cadillac Anderson (18) | Lindsey Hunter (8) | Market Square Arena; 11,371 | 20–52 |
| 73 | April 8 | @ Orlando | L 103–117 | Terry Mills (28) | Terry Mills (15) | Lindsey Hunter (7) | Orlando Arena; 15,291 | 20–53 |
| 74 | April 10 | Boston | L 111–116 | Lindsey Hunter (22) | Terry Mills (11) | Lindsey Hunter (7) | The Palace Of Auburn Hills; 17,189 | 20–54 |
| 75 | April 12 | Philadelphia | L 107–134 | Terry Mills (35) | Terry Mills (12) | Lindsey Hunter (10) | The Palace Of Auburn Hills; 17,189 | 20–55 |
| 76 | April 13 | @ Boston | L 96–109 | Terry Mills (25) | Cadillac Anderson (8) | Lindsey Hunter (11) | Boston Garden; 14,890 | 20–56 |
| 77 | April 15 | @ New Jersey | L 114–119 (OT) | Joe Dumars (38) | Charles Jones (11) | Lindsey Hunter (8) | Brendan Byrne Arena; 20,049 | 20–57 |
| 78 | April 17 | Indiana | L 99–104 | Isiah Thomas (22) | Cadillac Anderson (13) | Isiah Thomas (6) | The Palace Of Auburn Hills; 17,417 | 20–58 |
| 79 | April 19 | Orlando | L 104–132 | Joe Dumars (25) | Charles Jones (9) | Isiah Thomas (6) | The Palace Of Auburn Hills; 21,454 | 20–59 |
| 80 | April 20 | @ Milwaukee | L 78–103 | Allan Houston (19) | Cadillac Anderson (12) | Lindsey Hunter (7) | Bradley Center; 14,876 | 20–60 |
| 81 | April 23 | @ Charlotte | L 103–108 | Allan Houston (31) | Terry Mills, David Wood (10) | Lindsey Hunter (12) | Bradley Center; 14,876 | 20–61 |
| 82 | April 24 | @ Philadelphia | L 102–110 | Sean Elliott (26) | Cadillac Anderson (14) | Sean Elliott (9) | The Spectrum; 8,325 | 20–62 |

1993–94 schedule

== Player statistics ==
Legend
| GP | Games played | GS | Games started | MPG | Minutes per game |
| FG% | Field-goal percentage | 3P% | 3-point field-goal percentage | FT% | Free-throw percentage |
| RPG | Rebounds per game | APG | Assists per game | SPG | Steals per game |
| BPG | Blocks per game | PPG | Points per game |

| Player | GP | GS | MPG | FG% | 3P% | FT% | RPG | APG | SPG | BPG | PPG |
|---|---|---|---|---|---|---|---|---|---|---|---|
| Joe Dumars | 69 | 69 | 37.6 | .452 | .388 | .836 | 2.2 | 3.8 | 0.9 | 0.1 | 20.4 |
| Terry Mills | 80 | 74 | 34.7 | .511 | .329 | .797 | 8.4 | 2.2 | 0.8 | 0.8 | 17.3 |
| Isiah Thomas | 58 | 56 | 30.2 | .417 | .310 | .702 | 2.7 | 6.9 | 1.2 | 0.1 | 14.8 |
| Olden Polynice | 37 | 36 | 36.5 | .547 | .000 | .457 | 12.3 | 0.6 | 0.6 | 1.0 | 13.1 |
| Sean Elliott | 73 | 73 | 33.0 | .455 | .299 | .803 | 3.6 | 2.7 | 0.7 | 0.4 | 12.1 |
| Lindsey Hunter | 82 | 26 | 26.5 | .375 | .333 | .732 | 2.3 | 4.8 | 1.5 | 0.1 | 10.3 |
| Bill Laimbeer | 11 | 5 | 22.5 | .522 | .333 | .846 | 5.1 | 1.3 | 0.5 | 0.4 | 9.8 |
| Allan Houston | 79 | 20 | 19.2 | .405 | .299 | .824 | 1.5 | 1.3 | 0.4 | 0.2 | 8.5 |
| Greg Anderson | 77 | 47 | 21.1 | .543 | .333 | .571 | 7.4 | 0.7 | 0.7 | 0.9 | 6.4 |
| David Wood | 78 | 3 | 15.2 | .459 | .449 | .756 | 3.1 | 0.7 | 0.5 | 0.2 | 4.1 |
| Pete Chilcutt | 30 | 0 | 13.0 | .425 | .214 | .769 | 3.3 | 0.5 | 0.3 | 0.4 | 3.8 |
| Mark Macon | 35 | 1 | 10.6 | .396 | .286 | .625 | 1.0 | 1.1 | 0.9 | 0.0 | 3.6 |
| Ben Coleman | 9 | 0 | 8.6 | .480 | | .500 | 2.9 | 0.0 | 0.2 | 0.2 | 3.1 |
| Marcus Liberty | 35 | 0 | 7.8 | .310 | .370 | .486 | 1.6 | 0.4 | 0.3 | 0.1 | 2.9 |
| Charles Jones | 42 | 0 | 20.9 | .462 | .000 | .559 | 5.6 | 0.7 | 0.3 | 1.0 | 2.2 |
| Tod Murphy | 7 | 0 | 8.1 | .500 | | .500 | 1.3 | 0.4 | 0.3 | 0.0 | 2.1 |
| Tracy Moore | 3 | 0 | 3.3 | .667 | | 1.000 | 0.3 | 0.0 | 0.7 | 0.0 | 2.0 |
| Dan O'Sullivan | 13 | 0 | 4.3 | .333 | | .750 | 0.8 | 0.2 | 0.0 | 0.0 | 1.3 |

Player statistics citation:

== Awards and records ==
- Lindsey Hunter, NBA All-Rookie Team 2nd Team

== See also ==
- 1993-94 NBA season
