= 1993–94 New York Knicks season =

Season of National Basketball Association team the New York Knicks

- Conference champions
- Division champions
- Head coach: Pat Riley
- General manager: Ernie Grunfeld
- Owners: Paramount Communications, Inc. (through March 10, 1994); Viacom (starting on March 11, 1994)
- Arena: Madison Square Garden

Results
- Record: 57–25 (.695)
- Place: Division: 1st (Atlantic); Conference: 2nd (Eastern)
- Playoff finish: NBA Finals (lost to Rockets 3–4)
- Stats at Basketball Reference

Local media
- Television: MSG Network
- Radio: WFAN

The 1993–94 New York Knicks season was the 48th season for the franchise in the National Basketball Association. This marked the last season in which the Knicks (and all other MSG properties) were owned by Paramount Communications (formerly Gulf+Western), which was sold near the end of the season to Viacom, which in turn sold them to ITT Corporation and Cablevision. A couple of years later, ITT would sell their share to Cablevision. The Knicks' current owner, The Madison Square Garden Company, is a spin-off of Cablevision.

== Season summary ==
=== Off-season ===
During the off-season, the team signed free agent Anthony Bonner.

=== Regular season ===
With the addition of Bonner, the Knicks got off to a fast start by winning their first seven games of the regular season. However, Doc Rivers suffered a left knee injury, and was out for the remainder of the season after only just 19 games, while Charles D. Smith and second-year guard Hubert Davis also missed parts of the season due to injuries. At mid-season, the Knicks traded Tony Campbell to the Dallas Mavericks in exchange for Derek Harper, who filled in the void left by Rivers at the point guard position. Despite the injuries, the Knicks held a 34–14 record at the All-Star break, and then posted a 15-game winning streak between March and April, which included a 14–0 record in March. The Knicks finished in first place in the Atlantic Division with a 57–25 record, and earned the second seed in the Eastern Conference; the team qualified for the NBA playoffs for the seventh consecutive year.

Patrick Ewing had a stellar season averaging 24.5 points, 11.2 rebounds and 2.7 blocks per game, but was not named to an All-NBA Team at season's end, while John Starks averaged 19.0 points, 5.9 assists and 1.6 steals per game, and led the Knicks with 113 three-point field goals, but only played 59 games due to a left knee injury, which forced him to miss the remainder of the regular season. In addition, Charles Oakley provided the team with 11.8 points and rebounds per game each, contributed 1.3 steals per game, and was named to the NBA All-Defensive First Team, while Davis contributed 11.0 points per game in 56 games, and Smith provided with 10.4 points per game in 43 games. Meanwhile, Harper averaged 8.6 points, 4.4 assists and 1.5 steals per game in 54 games after the trade, Greg Anthony contributed 7.9 points, 4.6 assists and 1.4 steals per game, and Rivers provided with 7.5 points, 5.3 assists and 1.3 steals per game. Rolando Blackman contributed 7.3 points per game, Anthony Mason averaged 7.2 points and 5.8 rebounds per game, and Bonner provided with 5.1 points and 4.7 rebounds per game.

During the NBA All-Star weekend at the Target Center in Minneapolis, Minnesota, Ewing, Starks and Oakley were all selected for the 1994 NBA All-Star Game, as members of the Eastern Conference All-Star team; it was the first and only All-Star appearance for both Starks and Oakley. Ewing also finished in fifth place in Most Valuable Player voting, while Oakley finished in ninth place in Defensive Player of the Year voting, Mason finished tied in sixth place in Sixth Man of the Year voting, and head coach Pat Riley finished tied in fifth place in Coach of the Year voting.

The Knicks finished fourth in the NBA in home-game attendance, with an attendance of 810,193 at Madison Square Garden during the regular season.

=== NBA playoffs ===
In the Eastern Conference First Round of the 1994 NBA playoffs, the Knicks faced off against the 7th–seeded New Jersey Nets, a team that featured All-Star forward Derrick Coleman, All-Star guard Kenny Anderson, and Kevin Edwards. The Knicks won the first two games over the Nets at home at Madison Square Garden, before losing Game 3 on the road in overtime, 93–92 at the Brendan Byrne Arena. The Knicks won Game 4 over the Nets on the road, 102–92 to win the series in four games.

In the Eastern Conference Semi-finals, and for the fourth consecutive year, the team faced off against the 3rd–seeded, and 3-time defending NBA champion Chicago Bulls; All-Star guard Michael Jordan had retired prior to the season to pursue a baseball career, as the Bulls were now led by the All-Star trio of Scottie Pippen, Horace Grant and B.J. Armstrong. The Knicks won the first two games over the Bulls at Madison Square Garden, before losing the next two games on the road at the Chicago Stadium. The Knicks won Game 5 at home by a score of 87–86, but then lost Game 6 to the Bulls on the road, 93–79. With the series tied at 3–3, the Knicks won Game 7 over the Bulls at Madison Square Garden, 87–77 to win in a hard-fought seven-game series.

In the Eastern Conference Finals, and for the second consecutive year, the Knicks faced off against the 5th–seeded Indiana Pacers, who were led by Reggie Miller, Rik Smits and Derrick McKey. The Knicks took a 2–0 series lead before losing the next three games to the Pacers, losing the next two road games at the Market Square Arena, and then losing Game 5 at Madison Square Garden, 93–86 as the Pacers took a 3–2 series lead; in Game 5, Miller scored 25 points in the fourth quarter alone and finished with 39 points. However, the Knicks managed to win the next two games, including a Game 7 win over the Pacers at Madison Square Garden, 94–90 to win the series in another hard-fought seven games, and advance to the NBA Finals.

In the 1994 NBA Finals, the Knicks faced off against the 2nd–seeded Houston Rockets, a team that featured All-Star center, Most Valuable Player and Defensive Player of the Year, Hakeem Olajuwon, Otis Thorpe and Vernon Maxwell. The Rockets took a 2–1 series lead, but the Knicks managed to win the next two games at Madison Square Garden, which included a Game 5 home win over the Rockets, 91–84 to take a 3–2 series lead. However, the Knicks lost the next two games on the road, including a Game 7 loss to the Rockets at The Summit, 90–84, thus losing in a hard-fought seven-game series, as the Rockets won their first ever NBA championship in franchise history.

In the 1994 playoffs, the Knicks set the record for most games allowing under 95, and under 100 points, in one playoff run. Opponents were held to under 95 and 100 points in 23 and 24 games, respectively.

=== Notable incidents ===
One notable incident of the NBA playoffs occurred in Game 3 of the Eastern Conference Semi-finals, against the Bulls at the Chicago Stadium on May 13, 1994. During the second quarter, Harper and Bulls reserve guard Jo Jo English both got into a brawl, which spilled into the stands near the fans; the brawl also occurred in front of NBA commissioner David Stern, who was in attendance. Harper was fined $15,000 and suspended for two games, while English was fined $10,000 and suspended for one game. The Knicks lost to the Bulls by a score of 104–102.

=== Aftermath ===
Following the season, Blackman was released to free agency.

== Draft picks ==
The Knicks had no draft picks in 1993.

== Roster ==
1993–94 New York Knicks roster
Players

Pos.	No.	Player	Height	Weight	DOB	From
F	42	Eric Anderson	6 ft 9 in (2.06 m)	220 lb (100 kg)	1970–05–26	Indiana
G	50	Greg Anthony	6 ft 0 in (1.83 m)	176 lb (80 kg)	1967–11–15	UNLV
G	20	Rolando Blackman	6 ft 6 in (1.98 m)	190 lb (86 kg)	1959–02–26	Kansas State
F	4	Anthony Bonner	6 ft 8 in (2.03 m)	215 lb (98 kg)	1968–06–08	Saint Louis
G	44	Hubert Davis	6 ft 5 in (1.96 m)	183 lb (83 kg)	1970–05–17	North Carolina
C	33	Patrick Ewing	7 ft 0 in (2.13 m)	240 lb (109 kg)	1962–08–05	Georgetown
G	7	Corey Gaines	6 ft 3 in (1.91 m)	195 lb (88 kg)	1965–06–01	Loyola Marymount
G	11	Derek Harper	6 ft 4 in (1.93 m)	185 lb (84 kg)	1961–10–13	Illinois
F	14	Anthony Mason	6 ft 7 in (2.01 m)	250 lb (113 kg)	1966–12–14	Tennessee State
F	34	Charles Oakley	6 ft 8 in (2.03 m)	225 lb (102 kg)	1963–12–18	Virginia Union
G	25	Doc Rivers	6 ft 4 in (1.93 m)	185 lb (84 kg)	1961–10–13	Marquette
F	54	Charles Smith	6 ft 10 in (2.08 m)	230 lb (104 kg)	1965–07–16	Pittsburgh
G	3	John Starks	6 ft 3 in (1.91 m)	180 lb (82 kg)	1965–08–10	Oklahoma State
C	32	Herb Williams	6 ft 10 in (2.08 m)	242 lb (110 kg)	1958–02–16	Ohio State

Coaches
Head coach
- Pat Riley
Assistant(s)
- Dick Harter
- Jeff Nix
- Bob Salmi
- Jeff Van Gundy

Legend
- (DP) Unsigned draft pick
- (FA) Free agent
- (S) Suspended
- Injured

Roster
Updated: January 20, 1994

== Preseason ==
=== Game log ===
1993–94 pre-season game log
#	Date	Opponent	Score	Record	Lead scorer	Lead rebounder	Lead assist	Lead steals	Lead blocks	OT	Location	Time	Local cable TV	Local radio

== Regular season ==
=== Season standings ===
Atlantic Division	W	L	PCT	GB	Home	Road	Div
y-New York Knicks	57	25	.695	—	32–9	25–16	18–10
x-Orlando Magic	50	32	.610	7	31–10	19–22	20–8
x-New Jersey Nets	45	37	.549	12	29–12	16–25	17–11
x-Miami Heat	42	40	.512	15	22–19	20–21	16–12
Boston Celtics	32	50	.390	25	18–23	14–27	12–16
Philadelphia 76ers	25	57	.305	32	15–26	10–31	7–21
Washington Bullets	24	58	.293	33	17–24	7–34	8–20

#	Eastern Conference				
#	Team	W	L	PCT	GB
1	c-Atlanta Hawks	57	25	.695	–
2	y-New York Knicks	57	25	.695	–
3	x-Chicago Bulls	55	27	.671	2
4	x-Orlando Magic	50	32	.610	7
5	x-Indiana Pacers	47	35	.573	10
6	x-Cleveland Cavaliers	47	35	.573	10
7	x-New Jersey Nets	45	37	.549	12
8	x-Miami Heat	42	40	.512	15
9	Charlotte Hornets	41	41	.500	16
10	Boston Celtics	32	50	.390	25
11	Philadelphia 76ers	25	57	.305	32
12	Washington Bullets	24	58	.293	33
13	Milwaukee Bucks	20	62	.244	37
14	Detroit Pistons	20	62	.244	37

z – clinched division title
y – clinched division title
x – clinched playoff spot

== Game log ==
=== Regular season ===
1993–94 game log
Total: 57–25 (home: 32–9; road: 25–16)
November: 9–2 (home: 4–1; road: 5–1)

Game	Date	Team	Score	High points	High rebounds	High assists	Location Attendance	Record
1	November 5, 1993	@ Boston	W 111–108				Boston Garden	1–0
2	November 7, 1993	@ Cleveland	W 115–107 (OT)				Richfield Coliseum	2–0
3	November 9, 1993	Philadelphia	W 95–86				Madison Square Garden	3–0
4	November 10, 1993	@ Washington	W 92–84				USAir Arena	4–0
5	November 12, 1993	@ Indiana	W 103–84				Market Square Arena	5–0
6	November 13, 1993	Milwaukee	W 99–86				Madison Square Garden	6–0
7	November 16, 1993	@ Dallas	W 103–90				Reunion Arena	7–0
8	November 17, 1993	@ San Antonio	L 90–95				Alamodome	7–1
9	November 20, 1993	Utah	L 72–86				Madison Square Garden	7–2
10	November 22, 1993	Miami	W 119–87				Madison Square Garden	8–2
11	November 27, 1993	Detroit	W 112–85				Madison Square Garden	9–2

December: 9–5 (home: 7–2; road: 2–3)

Game	Date	Team	Score	High points	High rebounds	High assists	Location Attendance	Record
12	December 2, 1993	Houston	L 85–94				Madison Square Garden	9–3
13	December 4, 1993	Sacramento	W 123–101				Madison Square Garden	10–3
14	December 6, 1993	@ Utah	L 96–103				Delta Center	10–4
15	December 7, 1993	@ L.A. Lakers	W 92–78				Great Western Forum	11–4
16	December 9, 1993	@ Golden State	W 94–81				Oakland-Alameda County Coliseum Arena	12–4
17	December 11, 1993	Indiana	W 98–91				Madison Square Garden	13–4
18	December 14, 1993	Denver	W 93–84				Madison Square Garden	14–4
19	December 16, 1993	L.A. Lakers	W 108–85				Madison Square Garden	15–4
20	December 17, 1993	@ Chicago	L 86–98				Chicago Stadium	15–5
21	December 20, 1993	Dallas	W 101–92				Madison Square Garden	16–5
22	December 21, 1993	@ New Jersey	L 81–85				Brendan Byrne Arena	16–6
23	December 23, 1993	Atlanta	W 84–75				Madison Square Garden	17–6
24	December 28, 1993	New Jersey	L 95–97				Madison Square Garden	17–7
25	December 30, 1993	Washington	W 102–84				Madison Square Garden	18–7

January: 12–4 (home: 7–2; road: 5–2)

Game	Date	Team	Score	High points	High rebounds	High assists	Location Attendance	Record
26	January 2, 1994	Charlotte	L 123–124 (OT)				Madison Square Garden	18–8
27	January 4, 1994	Orlando	W 100–95				Madison Square Garden	19–8
28	January 6, 1994	@ Milwaukee	W 92–86				Bradley Center	19–9
29	January 8, 1994	@ Charlotte	L 99–102				Charlotte Coliseum	20–9
30	January 9, 1994	Portland	W 99–85				Madison Square Garden	21–9
31	January 11, 1994	L.A. Clippers	W 98–77				Madison Square Garden	22–9
32	January 13, 1994	@ Detroit	W 94–80				The Palace of Auburn Hills	23–9
33	January 15, 1994	Detroit	W 97–88				Madison Square Garden	24–9
34	January 17, 1994	Minnesota	W 106–94				Madison Square Garden	25–9
35	January 19, 1994	San Antonio	W 120–108				Madison Square Garden	26–9
36	January 21, 1994	@ Orlando	L 103–106				Orlando Arena	26–10
37	January 23, 1994	Philadelphia	L 92–99				Madison Square Garden	26–11
38	January 25, 1994	Phoenix	W 98–96				Madison Square Garden	27–11
39	January 27, 1994	@ L.A. Clippers	W 103–102				Aarowhead Pond of Anaheim	28–11
40	January 29, 1994	@ Seattle	W 106–92				Seattle Center Coliseum	29–11
41	January 30, 1994	@ Portland	W 103–93				Memorial Coliseum	30–11

February: 6–8 (home: 3–2; road: 3–6)

Game	Date	Team	Score	High points	High rebounds	High assists	Location Attendance	Record
42	February 1, 1994	Boston	W 114–79				Madison Square Garden	31–11
43	February 2, 1994	@ Washington	W 85–80				USAir Arena	32–11
44	February 4, 1994	@ Atlanta	L 102–114				The Omni	32–12
45	February 6, 1994	Orlando	W 95–77				Madison Square Garden	33–12
46	February 7, 1994	@ Miami	L 85–96				Miami Arena	33–13
47	February 9, 1994	@ Philadelphia	W 114–79				The Spectrum	34–13
48	February 10, 1994	Golden State	L 105–113				Madison Square Garden	34–14
All-Star Break
49	February 15, 1994	@ New Jersey	L 83–103				Brendan Byrne Arena	34–15
50	February 17, 1994	@ Cleveland	W 102–95				Richfield Coliseum	35–15
51	February 20, 1994	Chicago	W 86–68				Madison Square Garden	36–15
52	February 22, 1994	Seattle	L 82–93				Madison Square Garden	36–16
53	February 24, 1994	@ Houston	L 73–93				The Summit	36–17
54	February 25, 1994	@ Denver	L 94–102				McNichols Sports Arena	36–18
55	February 27, 1994	@ Phoenix	L 78–92				America West Arena	36–19

March: 14–0 (home: 7–0; road: 7–0)

Game	Date	Team	Score	High points	High rebounds	High assists	Location Attendance	Record
56	March 1, 1994	@ Sacramento	W 100–88				ARCO Arena	37–19
57	March 3, 1994	New Jersey	W 97–86				Madison Square Garden	38–19
58	March 7, 1994	@ Detroit	W 99–85				The Palace of Auburn Hills	39–19
59	March 9, 1994	@ Atlanta	W 90–83				The Omni	40–19
60	March 11, 1994	@ Boston	W 90–83				Boston Garden	41–19
61	March 12, 1994	Cleveland	W 96–86				Madison Square Garden	42–19
62	March 15, 1994	Indiana	W 88–82				Madison Square Garden	43–19
63	March 17, 1994	Milwaukee	W 105–83				Madison Square Garden	44–19
64	March 19, 1994	Boston	W 105–91				Madison Square Garden	45–19
65	March 22, 1994	Chicago	W 87–78				Madison Square Garden	46–19
66	March 24, 1994	@ Minnesota	W 123–106				Madison Square Garden	47–19
67	March 25, 1994	@ Indiana	W 85–82				Market Square Arena	48–19
68	March 27, 1994	@ Orlando	W 111–90				Orlando Arena	49–19
69	March 29, 1994	Charlotte	W 106–95				Madison Square Garden	50–19

April: 7–6 (home: 4–2; road: 3–4)

Game	Date	Team	Score	High points	High rebounds	High assists	Location Attendance	Record
70	April 2, 1994	Miami	W 110–87				Madison Square Garden	51–19
71	April 5, 1994	@ Miami	L 86–100				Miami Arena	51–20
72	April 7, 1994	Cleveland	W 97–94 (OT)				Madison Square Garden	52–20
73	April 8, 1994	@ Philadelphia	L 97–100				The Spectrum	52–21
74	April 10, 1994	@ New Jersey	L 88–107				Brendan Byrne Arena	52–22
75	April 11, 1994	Orlando	L 100–108				Madison Square Garden	52–23
76	April 14, 1994	@ Washington	W 111–106				USAir Arena	53–23
77	April 15, 1994	Washington	W 103–90				Madison Square Garden	54–23
78	April 17, 1994	@ Charlotte	L 91–107				Charlotte Coliseum	54–24
79	April 19, 1994	Atlanta	L 84–87				Madison Square Garden	54–25
80	April 21, 1994	Philadelphia	W 130–82				Madison Square Garden	55–25
81	April 22, 1994	@ Milwaukee	W 125–85				Bradley Center	56–25
82	April 24, 1994	@ Chicago	W 92–76				Chicago Stadium	57–25

1993–94 schedule

== Playoffs ==
1994 playoff game log
First Round: 3–1 (home: 2–0; road: 1–1)

Game	Date	Team	Score	High points	High rebounds	High assists	Location Attendance	Series
1	April 29, 1994	New Jersey	W 91–80	Patrick Ewing (25)	Patrick Ewing (13)	Patrick Ewing (5)	Madison Square Garden; 19,763	1–0
2	May 1, 1994	New Jersey	W 90–81	Charles Oakley (25)	Charles Oakley (24)	Derek Harper (8)	Madison Square Garden; 19,763	2–0
3	May 4, 1994	@ New Jersey	L 92–93 (OT)	Patrick Ewing (27)	Charles Oakley (16)	Harper, Davis (4)	Brendan Byrne Arena; 20,049	2–1
4	May 6, 1994	@ New Jersey	W 102–92	Patrick Ewing (36)	Patrick Ewing (14)	Oakley, Starks (4)	Brendan Byrne Arena; 20,049	3–1

Conference semifinals: 4–3 (home: 4–0; road: 0–3)

Game	Date	Team	Score	High points	High rebounds	High assists	Location Attendance	Series
1	May 8, 1994	Chicago	W 90–86	Patrick Ewing (18)	Patrick Ewing (12)	three players tied (3)	Madison Square Garden; 19,763	1–0
2	May 11, 1994	Chicago	W 96–91	Patrick Ewing (26)	Anthony Mason (14)	Anthony Mason (6)	Madison Square Garden; 19,763	2–0
3	May 13, 1994	@ Chicago	L 102–104	Patrick Ewing (34)	Ewing, Oakley (9)	John Starks (6)	Chicago Stadium; 18,676	2–1
4	May 15, 1994	@ Chicago	L 83–95	Patrick Ewing (18)	Charles Oakley (17)	Anthony, Starks (6)	Chicago Stadium; 18,676	2–2
5	May 18, 1994	Chicago	W 87–86	Patrick Ewing (20)	Patrick Ewing (13)	Greg Anthony (8)	Madison Square Garden; 19,763	3–2
6	May 20, 1994	@ Chicago	L 79–93	Patrick Ewing (26)	Patrick Ewing (14)	John Starks (7)	Chicago Stadium; 18,676	3–3
7	May 22, 1994	Chicago	W 87–77	Patrick Ewing (18)	Charles Oakley (20)	Patrick Ewing (6)	Madison Square Garden; 19,763	4–3

Conference finals: 4–3 (home: 3–1; road: 1–2)

Game	Date	Team	Score	High points	High rebounds	High assists	Location Attendance	Series
1	May 24, 1994	Indiana	W 100–89	Patrick Ewing (28)	Charles Oakley (13)	John Starks (6)	Madison Square Garden; 19,763	1–0
2	May 26, 1994	Indiana	W 89–78	Patrick Ewing (32)	Patrick Ewing (13)	Derek Harper (8)	Madison Square Garden; 19,763	2–0
3	May 28, 1994	@ Indiana	L 68–88	Oakley, Starks (12)	Charles Oakley (9)	Greg Anthony (4)	Market Square Arena; 16,530	2–1
4	May 30, 1994	@ Indiana	L 77–83	Patrick Ewing (25)	Charles Oakley (15)	John Starks (4)	Market Square Arena; 16,536	2–2
5	June 1, 1994	Indiana	L 86–93	Patrick Ewing (29)	Charles Oakley (13)	John Starks (8)	Madison Square Garden	2–3
6	June 3, 1994	@ Indiana	W 98–91	John Starks (26)	Patrick Ewing (10)	John Starks (6)	Market Square Arena; 16,529	3–3
7	June 5, 1994	Indiana	W 94–90	Patrick Ewing (24)	Patrick Ewing (22)	Patrick Ewing (7)	Madison Square Garden; 19,763	4–3

NBA Finals: 3–4 (home: 2–1; road: 1–3)

Game	Date	Team	Score	High points	High rebounds	High assists	Location Attendance	Series
1	June 8, 1994	@ Houston	L 78–85	Patrick Ewing (23)	Charles Oakley (14)	Derek Harper (5)	The Summit; 16,611	0–1
2	June 10, 1994	@ Houston	W 91–83	John Starks (19)	Patrick Ewing (13)	John Starks (9)	The Summit; 16,611	1–1
3	June 12, 1994	Houston	L 89–93	Derek Harper (21)	Patrick Ewing (13)	John Starks (9)	Madison Square Garden; 19,763	1–2
4	June 15, 1994	Houston	W 91–82	Derek Harper (21)	Charles Oakley (20)	Derek Harper (5)	Madison Square Garden; 19,763	2–2
5	June 17, 1994	Houston	W 91–84	Patrick Ewing (25)	Patrick Ewing (22)	Derek Harper (7)	Madison Square Garden; 19,763	3–2
6	June 19, 1994	@ Houston	L 84–86	John Starks (27)	Patrick Ewing (15)	Derek Harper (10)	The Summit; 16,611	3–3
7	June 22, 1994	@ Houston	L 84–90	Derek Harper (23)	Charles Oakley (14)	Derek Harper (5)	The Summit; 16,611	3–4

1994 schedule

=== Interruption of Game 5 NBA Finals telecast by O. J. Simpson car chase ===
On June 17, 1994, during Game 5 between the Rockets and the Knicks at Madison Square Garden, most NBC affiliates (with the noted exception being WNBC-TV out of New York City, New York), split the coverage of the game between NFL Hall of Famer O. J. Simpson's slow-speed freeway chase with the Los Angeles Police Department. At the time, Simpson had been an NFL analyst on NBC. A visibly confused and distraught Bob Costas, who was NBC's anchor for their NBA Finals coverage at the time, said during the telecast from Madison Square Garden that the Simpson situation was "not just tragic, but now surreal".

== Player statistics ==
Legend
GP	Games played	GS	Games started	MPG	Minutes per game
FG%	Field-goal percentage	3P%	3-point field-goal percentage	FT%	Free-throw percentage
RPG	Rebounds per game	APG	Assists per game	SPG	Steals per game
BPG	Blocks per game	PPG	Points per game

=== Regular season ===
Player	GP	GS	MPG	FG%	3P%	FT%	RPG	APG	SPG	BPG	PPG
Eric Anderson	11	0	3.5	.412	1.000	.357	1.5	.2	.0	.1	1.9
Greg Anthony	80	36	24.9	.394	.300	.774	2.4	4.6	1.4	.2	7.9
Rolando Blackman	55	1	17.6	.436	.357	.906	1.7	1.4	.5	.1	7.3
Anthony Bonner	73	38	19.2	.563		.476	4.7	1.2	1.0	.2	5.1
Tony Campbell^{†}	22	11	17.2	.492	.333	.811	2.7	1.4	.9	.0	7.1
Hubert Davis	56	27	23.8	.471	.402	.825	1.2	2.9	.7	.1	11.0
Patrick Ewing	79	79	37.6	.496	.286	.765	11.2	2.3	1.1	2.7	24.5
Corey Gaines	18	0	4.3	.450	.400	.867	.7	1.7	.1	.0	1.8
Derek Harper^{†}	54	27	24.3	.430	.367	.743	1.6	4.4	1.5	.1	8.6
Anthony Mason	73	12	26.1	.476	.000	.720	5.8	2.1	.4	.1	7.2
Charles Oakley	82	82	35.8	.478	.000	.776	11.8	2.7	1.3	.2	11.8
Gerald Paddio^{†}	3	0	2.7	.400			.0	.0	.0	.0	1.3
Doc Rivers	19	19	26.3	.433	.365	.636	2.1	5.3	1.3	.3	7.5
Charles Smith	43	21	25.7	.443	.500	.719	3.8	1.2	.6	1.0	10.4
John Starks	59	54	34.9	.420	.335	.754	3.1	5.9	1.6	.1	19.0
Herb Williams	70	3	11.1	.442	.000	.643	2.6	.4	.3	.6	3.3

=== Playoffs ===
Player	GP	GS	MPG	FG%	3P%	FT%	RPG	APG	SPG	BPG	PPG
Greg Anthony	25	3	17.4	.352	.295	.583	1.1	2.4	.8	.3	4.9
Rolando Blackman	6	0	5.7	.273	.500		.5	.5	.0	.0	1.3
Anthony Bonner	13	7	9.1	.455		.538	2.2	.2	.4	.0	2.1
Hubert Davis	23	7	17.2	.364	.286	.719	.9	1.1	.2	.1	5.3
Patrick Ewing	25	25	41.3	.437	.364	.755	11.7	2.6	1.3	3.0	21.9
Corey Gaines	4	0	7.0	.000	.000		.5	.5	.0	.0	.0
Derek Harper	23	22	32.6	.429	.341	.643	2.3	4.5	1.8	.0	11.4
Anthony Mason	25	0	26.4	.489		.714	5.8	1.8	.6	.2	7.6
Charles Oakley	25	25	39.7	.477		.775	11.7	2.4	1.4	.2	13.2
Charles Smith	25	18	24.5	.480	.000	.729	3.8	1.0	.5	1.0	8.8
John Starks	25	18	33.6	.381	.356	.770	2.3	4.6	1.4	.1	14.6
Herb Williams	19	0	6.7	.419		.667	1.1	.2	.2	.6	1.5

- ^{†} Denotes player spent time with another team in the season. Stats reflect time with the Knicks only.

Player statistics citation:

== Media ==
=== Television ===
Channel	Play-by-play	Alternate Play-by-play	Color commentator	Studio host	Alternate Studio host
MSG Network	Marv Albert	Al Trautwig	John Andariese	Al Trautwig	Bruce Beck

Some New York Knicks TV games carried on MSG 2 because of broadcast conflict with the New York Rangers (NHL).

=== Radio ===
Channel	Play-by-play	Alternate Play-by-play	Color commentator	Studio Host	Alternate Studio Host
WFAN	Mike Breen	John Minko	Walt Frazier	John Minko	Steve Somers

Some New York Knicks radio games carried on WEVD because of broadcast conflict with the New York Jets (NFL) and the New York Rangers (NHL).

== Awards and records ==
=== Awards ===
- Charles Oakley, NBA All-Defensive First Team

== Transactions ==
=== Trades ===
January 6, 1994	To New York Knicks Derek Harper To Dallas Mavericks Tony Campbell; 1997 1st-round pick

=== Free agents ===
Additions
Player	Date signed	Former team
Anthony Bonner	October 5	Sacramento Kings
Corey Gaines	December 18	La Crosse Catbirds (CBA)
Gerald Paddio	January 5	Scavolini Pesaro (Italy)

Subtractions
Player	Date signed	New team
Gerald Paddio	January 20	Washington Bullets

Player Transactions Citation:

== See also ==
- 1993–94 NBA season
