= 1993–94 Washington Bullets season =

NBA professional basketball team season

- Head coach: Wes Unseld
- Arena: USAir Arena (37 games); Baltimore Arena (4 games)

Results
- Record: 24–58 (.293)
- Place: Division: 7th (Atlantic); Conference: 12th (Eastern)
- Playoff finish: Did not qualify
- Stats at Basketball Reference

Local media
- Television: WDCA; Home Team Sports
- Radio: WTOP

The 1993–94 Washington Bullets season was the 33rd season for the Washington Bullets in the National Basketball Association, and their 21st season in Washington, D.C..

== Season summary ==
=== Off-season ===
The Bullets received the sixth overall pick in the 1993 NBA draft, and selected shooting guard Calbert Cheaney out of Indiana University, and also selected 7' 7" Romanian center Gheorghe Mureșan with the 30th overall pick. During the off-season, the team acquired former All-Star center Kevin Duckworth from the Portland Trail Blazers, signed free agents Kenny Walker, and undrafted rookie shooting guard Mitchell Butler from the University of California, Los Angeles, and released LaBradford Smith to free agency after seven games, as he later on signed with the Sacramento Kings.

=== Regular season ===
However, Duckworth never lived up to expectations as he struggled with weight problems, where he weighed up to 340 lbs during the regular season. After a 6–6 start to the regular season, the Bullets' struggles continued losing ten straight games in December, holding a 15–32 record at the All-Star break, then suffering a nine-game losing streak in March. The Bullets finished in last place in the Atlantic Division with a 24–58 record; the team missed the NBA playoffs for the sixth consecutive year.

Second-year forward Don MacLean averaged 18.2 points and 6.2 rebounds per game, and was named the NBA Most Improved Player of the Year, while Rex Chapman averaged 18.2 points per game, and second-year star Tom Gugliotta provided the team with 17.1 points, 9.3 rebounds and 2.2 steals per game. In addition, Michael Adams provided with 12.1 points, 6.9 assists and 1.4 steals per game, while Cheaney contributed 12.0 points per game, and Pervis Ellison averaged 7.3 points and 5.1 rebounds per game, but only played just 47 games due to injury. Meanwhile, Butler contributed 6.9 points per game off the bench, and Duckworth averaged 6.6 points and 4.7 rebounds per game; also off the bench, second-year guard Brent Price provided with 6.2 points and 3.3 assists per game, while Mureșan averaged 5.6 points and 3.6 rebounds per game, and Walker contributed 4.8 points and 4.0 rebounds per game.

During the NBA All-Star weekend at the Target Center in Minneapolis, Minnesota, Cheaney was selected for the inaugural NBA Rookie Game, as a member of the Sensations team. Chapman finished tied in seventh place in Most Improved Player voting. The Bullets finished 15th in the NBA in home-game attendance, with an attendance of 619,756 at USAir Arena during the regular season.

=== Notable incidents ===
On January 7, 1994, the Bullets nearly dealt with tragedy as forward Larry Stewart was gagged, shot in the neck, and stabbed in the right thigh by four intruders in his Baltimore county home; he was taken to Baltimore's shock trauma center, where the doctors found that the bullet had passed through his neck, narrowly missing his spinal cord. Stewart had only played just three games this season due to a foot injury.

=== Aftermath ===
Following the season, Ellison signed as a free agent with the Boston Celtics, while Adams was traded to the Charlotte Hornets, and head coach Wes Unseld resigned after six in a half seasons coaching the Bullets; 27 years later, Unseld's son, Wes Unseld Jr., became the head coach of the renamed Wizards team in 2021, one year after his father's death due to pneumonia at the age of 74 in 2020.

== Draft picks ==
Round	Pick	Player	Position	Nationality	College
1	6	Calbert Cheaney	SG/SF	United States	Indiana
2	30	Gheorghe Mureșan	C	Romania	
2	38	Conrad McRae		United States	Syracuse

== Roster ==
1993–94 Washington Bullets roster
Players

Pos.	No.	Player	Height	Weight	DOB	From
G	10	Michael Adams	5 ft 10 in (1.78 m)	162 lb (73 kg)	––	Boston College
G	32	Mitchell Butler	6 ft 5 in (1.96 m)	210 lb (95 kg)	––	UCLA
G	3	Rex Chapman	6 ft 4 in (1.93 m)	185 lb (84 kg)	––	Kentucky
G/F	40	Calbert Cheaney	6 ft 7 in (2.01 m)	209 lb (95 kg)	––	Indiana
C	50	Marty Conlon	6 ft 10 in (2.08 m)	224 lb (102 kg)	––	Providence
C	00	Kevin Duckworth	7 ft 0 in (2.13 m)	275 lb (125 kg)	––	Eastern Illinois
F	43	Pervis Ellison	6 ft 9 in (2.06 m)	210 lb (95 kg)	––	Louisville
F	24	Tom Gugliotta	6 ft 10 in (2.08 m)	240 lb (109 kg)	––	NC State
F	34	Don MacLean	6 ft 10 in (2.08 m)	235 lb (107 kg)	––	UCLA
C	77	Gheorghe Mureșan	7 ft 7 in (2.31 m)	303 lb (137 kg)	––	Romania
G	14	Doug Overton	6 ft 3 in (1.91 m)	190 lb (86 kg)	––	La Salle
G	20	Brent Price	6 ft 1 in (1.85 m)	165 lb (75 kg)	––	Oklahoma
F	33	Larry Stewart (injured)	6 ft 8 in (2.03 m)	220 lb (100 kg)	––	Coppin State
F	15	Kenny Walker	6 ft 8 in (2.03 m)	210 lb (95 kg)	––	Kentucky

Coaches
Head coach
- Wes Unseld
Assistant(s)
- Jeff Bzdelik
- Robert Reid

Legend
- (DP) Unsigned draft pick
- (FA) Free agent
- (S) Suspended
- Injured

Roster

== Regular season ==
=== Season standings ===
Atlantic Division	W	L	PCT	GB	Home	Road	Div
y-New York Knicks	57	25	.695	—	32–9	25–16	18–10
x-Orlando Magic	50	32	.610	7	31–10	19–22	20–8
x-New Jersey Nets	45	37	.549	12	29–12	16–25	17–11
x-Miami Heat	42	40	.512	15	22–19	20–21	16–12
Boston Celtics	32	50	.390	25	18–23	14–27	12–16
Philadelphia 76ers	25	57	.305	32	15–26	10–31	7–21
Washington Bullets	24	58	.293	33	17–24	7–34	8–20

#	Eastern Conference				
#	Team	W	L	PCT	GB
1	c-Atlanta Hawks	57	25	.695	–
2	y-New York Knicks	57	25	.695	–
3	x-Chicago Bulls	55	27	.671	2
4	x-Orlando Magic	50	32	.610	7
5	x-Indiana Pacers	47	35	.573	10
6	x-Cleveland Cavaliers	47	35	.573	10
7	x-New Jersey Nets	45	37	.549	12
8	x-Miami Heat	42	40	.512	15
9	Charlotte Hornets	41	41	.500	16
10	Boston Celtics	32	50	.390	25
11	Philadelphia 76ers	25	57	.305	32
12	Washington Bullets	24	58	.293	33
13	Milwaukee Bucks	20	62	.244	37
14	Detroit Pistons	20	62	.244	37

z – clinched division title
y – clinched division title
x – clinched playoff spot

== Player statistics ==
Legend
GP	Games played	GS	Games started	MPG	Minutes per game
FG%	Field-goal percentage	3P%	3-point field-goal percentage	FT%	Free-throw percentage
RPG	Rebounds per game	APG	Assists per game	SPG	Steals per game
BPG	Blocks per game	PPG	Points per game

=== Regular season ===
Washington Bullets statistics
Player	GP	GS	MPG	FG%	3P%	FT%	RPG	APG	SPG	BPG	PPG
Michael Adams	70	67	33.4	.408	.288	.830	2.6	6.9	1.4	.1	12.1
Ron Anderson^{†}	10	0	18.0	.465	.214	.818	2.7	1.1	.3	.1	5.2
Manute Bol^{†}	2	0	3.0				.5	.5	.0	.5	.0
Mitchell Butler	75	19	17.6	.495	.000	.578	3.0	1.0	.7	.3	6.9
Rex Chapman	60	59	33.8	.498	.388	.816	2.4	3.1	1.0	.1	18.2
Calbert Cheaney	65	21	24.7	.470	.043	.770	2.9	1.9	1.0	.2	12.0
Marty Conlon^{†}	14	1	14.4	.518	.000	.800	3.6	.4	.3	.1	5.0
Kevin Duckworth	69	52	21.5	.417		.667	4.7	.8	.5	.5	6.6
Pervis Ellison	47	24	25.1	.469	.000	.722	5.1	1.5	.5	1.1	7.3
Andrew Gaze	7	0	10.0	.471	.500	1.000	1.0	.7	.3	.1	3.1
Tom Gugliotta	78	78	35.8	.466	.270	.685	9.3	3.5	2.2	.7	17.1
Tito Horford	3	0	9.3	.000			1.0	.0	.3	1.0	.0
Don MacLean	75	69	33.2	.502	.143	.824	6.2	2.1	.6	.3	18.2
Gheorghe Mureșan	54	2	12.0	.545		.676	3.6	.3	.5	.9	5.6
Doug Overton	61	1	12.3	.403	.091	.827	1.1	1.5	.3	.0	3.6
Gerald Paddio^{†}	8	0	9.3	.344	.000	.571	1.4	.9	.4	.0	3.8
Brent Price	65	13	15.9	.433	.333	.782	1.4	3.3	.8	.0	6.2
LaBradford Smith^{†}	7	0	6.9	.444		.750	1.1	.7	.4	.1	4.4
Larry Stewart	3	0	11.7	.375		.700	2.3	.7	.7	.3	4.3
Kenny Walker	73	4	19.1	.482	.000	.696	4.0	.5	.4	.8	4.8

- ^{†} Denotes player spent time with another team in the season. Stats reflect time with the Bullets only.

Player statistics citation:

== Awards and records ==
- Don MacLean, NBA Most Improved Player Award

== See also ==
- 1993–94 NBA season
