= 1993–94 New Jersey Nets season =

NBA professional basketball team season

- Head coach: Chuck Daly
- General manager: Willis Reed
- Arena: Brendan Byrne Arena

Results
- Record: 45–37 (.549)
- Place: Division: 3rd (Atlantic); Conference: 7th (Eastern)
- Playoff finish: First round (lost to Knicks 1–3)
- Stats at Basketball Reference

Local media
- Television: WWOR-TV; SportsChannel New York
- Radio: WBBR/WPAT/WEVD

The 1993–94 New Jersey Nets season was the Nets' 27th season in the National Basketball Association, and 18th season in East Rutherford, New Jersey.

== Season summary ==
=== Off-season ===
After the tragic death of Croatian star guard Dražen Petrović in a car accident at the age of 28 on June 7, 1993, the Nets signed free agents Kevin Edwards, Armen Gilliam, and undrafted rookie point guard David Wesley, and acquired Benoit Benjamin from the Los Angeles Lakers during the off-season.

=== Regular season ===
With the addition of Edwards, Gilliam and Benjamin, the Nets struggled losing 10 of their first 14 games of the regular season, as Chris Morris only played just 50 games due to knee and thumb injuries. In December, the team traded Rumeal Robinson to the Charlotte Hornets in exchange for Johnny Newman. The Nets played slightly below .500 in winning percentage as the season progressed, and held a 22–24 at the All-Star break. The Nets won eight of their final eleven games of the season, and finished in third place in the Atlantic Division with a 45–37 record, earning the seventh seed in the Eastern Conference.

Derrick Coleman averaged 20.2 points, 11.3 rebounds and 1.8 blocks per game, and was named to the All-NBA Third Team, while Kenny Anderson averaged 18.8 points, 9.6 assists and 1.9 steals per game, and Edwards provided the team with 14.0 points and 1.5 steals per game. In addition, Gilliam played a sixth man role off the bench, averaging 11.8 points and 6.1 rebounds per game, while Morris provided with 10.9 points and 4.6 rebounds per game, Newman contributed 9.5 points per game in 63 games after the trade, Benjamin averaged 9.4 points, 6.5 rebounds and 1.2 blocks per game, rookie power forward P.J. Brown contributed 5.7 points and 6.2 rebounds per game, and Jayson Williams provided with 4.6 points and 3.8 rebounds per game.

During the NBA All-Star weekend at the Target Center in Minneapolis, Minnesota, Coleman and Anderson were both selected for the 1994 NBA All-Star Game, as members of the Eastern Conference All-Star team; it was the first and only All-Star appearance for both players. Meanwhile, Brown was selected for the inaugural NBA Rookie Game, as a member of the Sensations team. Gilliam finished in fifth place in Sixth Man of the Year voting, while Newman finished tied in sixth place, and head coach Chuck Daly finished tied in fifth place in Coach of the Year voting.

The Nets finished twelfth in the NBA in home-game attendance, with an attendance of 658,304 at the Brendan Byrne Arena during the regular season.

=== NBA playoffs ===
In the Eastern Conference First Round of the 1994 NBA playoffs, the Nets faced off against the 2nd–seeded, and Atlantic Division champion New York Knicks, who were led by the All-Star trio of Patrick Ewing, John Starks and Charles Oakley. The Nets lost the first two games to the Knicks on the road at Madison Square Garden, but managed to win Game 3 at home in overtime, 93–92 at the Brendan Byrne Arena. However, the Nets lost Game 4 to the Knicks at home, 102–92, thus losing the series in four games; the Nets struggled only shooting .357 in field-goal percentage during the series.

The Knicks would advance to the 1994 NBA Finals, but would lose to the Houston Rockets in a full seven-game series.

=== Aftermath ===
Following the season, Daly resigned as head coach to pursue a broadcasting career, while Newman signed as a free agent with the Milwaukee Bucks, and Wesley signed with the Boston Celtics.

== Draft picks ==
Round	Pick	Player	Position	Nationality	College
1	16	Rex Walters	SG	United States	Kansas
2	36	John Best	PF	United States	Tennessee Tech

== Roster ==
1993–94 New Jersey Nets roster
Players

Pos.	No.	Player	Height	Weight	DOB	From
G	7	Kenny Anderson	6 ft 0 in (1.83 m)	168 lb (76 kg)	1970-10-09	Georgia Tech
C	00	Benoit Benjamin	7 ft 0 in (2.13 m)	250 lb (113 kg)	1964-11-22	Creighton
F	42	P. J. Brown	6 ft 11 in (2.11 m)	225 lb (102 kg)	1969-10-14	Louisiana Tech
F	44	Derrick Coleman	6 ft 10 in (2.08 m)	230 lb (104 kg)	1967-06-21	Syracuse
G	21	Kevin Edwards	6 ft 3 in (1.91 m)	190 lb (86 kg)	1965-10-30	DePaul
F	43	Armen Gilliam	6 ft 9 in (2.06 m)	230 lb (104 kg)	1964-05-28	UNLV
F	4	Rick Mahorn	6 ft 10 in (2.08 m)	240 lb (109 kg)	1958-09-21	Hampton
F	34	Chris Morris	6 ft 8 in (2.03 m)	210 lb (95 kg)	1966-01-20	Auburn
G	20	Johnny Newman	6 ft 7 in (2.01 m)	190 lb (86 kg)	1963-11-28	Richmond
C	33	Dwayne Schintzius	7 ft 1 in (2.16 m)	260 lb (118 kg)	1968-10-14	Florida
G	2	Rex Walters	6 ft 4 in (1.93 m)	190 lb (86 kg)	1970-03-12	Kansas
G	1	David Wesley	6 ft 0 in (1.83 m)	190 lb (86 kg)	1970-11-14	Baylor
F	55	Jayson Williams	6 ft 9 in (2.06 m)	240 lb (109 kg)	1968-02-22	St. John's

Coaches
Head coach
- Chuck Daly
Assistant(s)
- Rick Carlisle
- Paul Silas
- Brendan Suhr

Legend
- (DP) Unsigned draft pick
- (FA) Free agent
- (S) Suspended
- Injured

Roster

== Regular season ==
=== Season standings ===
Atlantic Division	W	L	PCT	GB	Home	Road	Div
y-New York Knicks	57	25	.695	—	32–9	25–16	18–10
x-Orlando Magic	50	32	.610	7	31–10	19–22	20–8
x-New Jersey Nets	45	37	.549	12	29–12	16–25	17–11
x-Miami Heat	42	40	.512	15	22–19	20–21	16–12
Boston Celtics	32	50	.390	25	18–23	14–27	12–16
Philadelphia 76ers	25	57	.305	32	15–26	10–31	7–21
Washington Bullets	24	58	.293	33	17–24	7–34	8–20

#	Eastern Conference				
#	Team	W	L	PCT	GB
1	c-Atlanta Hawks	57	25	.695	–
2	y-New York Knicks	57	25	.695	–
3	x-Chicago Bulls	55	27	.671	2
4	x-Orlando Magic	50	32	.610	7
5	x-Indiana Pacers	47	35	.573	10
6	x-Cleveland Cavaliers	47	35	.573	10
7	x-New Jersey Nets	45	37	.549	12
8	x-Miami Heat	42	40	.512	15
9	Charlotte Hornets	41	41	.500	16
10	Boston Celtics	32	50	.390	25
11	Philadelphia 76ers	25	57	.305	32
12	Washington Bullets	24	58	.293	33
13	Milwaukee Bucks	20	62	.244	37
14	Detroit Pistons	20	62	.244	37

z – clinched division title
y – clinched division title
x – clinched playoff spot

== Game log ==
=== Regular season ===
1993–94 game log
Total: 45–37 (Home: 29–12; Road: 16–25)
November: 4–10 (home: 2–4; road: 2–6)

Game	Date	Team	Score	High points	High rebounds	High assists	Location Attendance	Record
1	November 5; 8:30 p.m. EST	@ Houston	L 88–110	Morris (20)	Coleman (13)	Anderson (7)	The Summit; 11,128	0–1
7	November 16; 7:30 p.m. EST	Houston	L 84–90	Anderson (24)	Anderson (13)	Anderson (12)	Brendan Byrne Arena; 9,110	3–4

December: 7–6 (home: 6–2; road: 1–4)

Game	Date	Team	Score	High points	High rebounds	High assists	Location Attendance	Record

January: 8–6 (home: 4–2; road: 4–4)

Game	Date	Team	Score	High points	High rebounds	High assists	Location Attendance	Record

February: 9–4 (home: 5–2; road: 4–2)

Game	Date	Team	Score	High points	High rebounds	High assists	Location Attendance	Record
All-Star Break

March: 9–6 (home: 7–0; road: 2–6)

Game	Date	Team	Score	High points	High rebounds	High assists	Location Attendance	Record

April: 8–5 (home: 5–2; road: 3–3)

Game	Date	Team	Score	High points	High rebounds	High assists	Location Attendance	Record

1993–94 schedule

=== Playoffs ===
1994 playoff game log
First round: 1–3 (home: 1–1; road: 0–2)

Game	Date	Team	Score	High points	High rebounds	High assists	Location Attendance	Series
1	April 29	@ New York	L 80–91	Derrick Coleman (27)	Derrick Coleman (10)	Kenny Anderson (6)	Madison Square Garden; 19,763	0–1
2	May 1	@ New York	L 81–90	Kenny Anderson (21)	Derrick Coleman (21)	four players tied (3)	Madison Square Garden; 19,763	0–2
3	May 4	New York	W 93–92 (OT)	Derrick Coleman (25)	Derrick Coleman (17)	Kenny Anderson (11)	Brendan Byrne Arena; 20,049	1–2
4	May 6	New York	L 102–92	Derrick Coleman (31)	Derrick Coleman (9)	Kenny Anderson (7)	Brendan Byrne Arena; 20,049	1–3

1994 schedule

== Player statistics ==
Legend
GP	Games played	GS	Games started	MPG	Minutes per game
FG%	Field-goal percentage	3P%	3-point field-goal percentage	FT%	Free-throw percentage
RPG	Rebounds per game	APG	Assists per game	SPG	Steals per game
BPG	Blocks per game	PPG	Points per game

=== Season ===
Player	GP	GS	MPG	FG%	3P%	FT%	RPG	APG	SPG	BPG	PPG
Derrick Coleman	77	77	36.1	.447	.314	.774	11.3	3.4	0.9	1.8	20.2
Kenny Anderson	82	82	38.2	.417	.303	.818	3.9	9.6	1.9	0.2	18.8
Kevin Edwards	82	82	33.3	.458	.354	.770	3.4	2.8	1.5	0.4	14.0
Armen Gilliam	82	5	24.0	.510	.000	.759	6.1	0.8	0.5	0.7	11.8
Chris Morris	50	27	27.0	.447	.361	.720	4.6	1.7	1.1	1.0	10.9
Johnny Newman	63	0	20.1	.453	.270	.807	1.9	0.7	0.8	0.3	9.5
Benoit Benjamin	77	74	23.6	.480		.710	6.5	0.6	0.5	1.2	9.3
Rumeal Robinson	17	0	17.7	.353	.467	.500	1.4	2.6	0.9	0.2	5.9
P.J. Brown	79	54	24.7	.415	.167	.757	6.2	1.2	0.9	1.2	5.7
Jayson Williams	70	0	12.5	.427		.605	3.8	0.4	0.2	0.5	4.6
Ron Anderson	11	2	16.0	.349	.333	.833	2.4	0.5	0.5	0.2	4.0
Rex Walters	48	0	8.0	.522	.500	.824	0.8	1.5	0.3	0.1	3.4
David Wesley	60	0	9.0	.368	.234	.830	0.7	2.1	0.6	0.1	3.1
Dwayne Schintzius	30	7	10.6	.345		.588	3.0	0.4	0.2	0.6	2.3
Rick Mahorn	28	0	8.1	.489	.000	.650	1.9	0.2	0.1	0.2	2.1
Dave Jamerson	4	0	2.5	.000		.500	0.8	0.3	0.0	0.0	0.3

=== Playoffs ===
Player	GP	GS	MPG	FG%	3P%	FT%	RPG	APG	SPG	BPG	PPG
Derrick Coleman	4	4	43.3	.397	.556	.780	14.3	2.5	0.5	1.3	24.5
Kenny Anderson	4	4	45.3	.352	.300	.667	3.0	6.8	2.3	0.0	15.8
Kevin Edwards	4	4	37.0	.360	.000	.929	4.0	2.3	1.3	0.3	12.3
Armen Gilliam	4	0	28.0	.441	.000	.750	6.3	0.3	0.5	1.8	10.5
Chris Morris	4	3	24.5	.279	.150	1.000	5.5	1.8	1.3	1.3	9.3
Benoit Benjamin	4	4	27.0	.412		.875	5.3	0.3	0.5	2.0	5.3
P.J. Brown	4	1	14.0	.222		1.000	2.0	0.8	0.0	0.5	3.0
Johnny Newman	4	0	13.5	.231	.250	.714	1.3	0.5	0.5	0.5	3.0
David Wesley	3	0	6.0	.429	.250	1.000	0.0	1.0	0.7	0.0	3.0
Rex Walters	1	0	1.0	1.000			0.0	0.0	0.0	0.0	2.0
Jayson Williams	2	0	8.5	.000		.500	1.5	0.0	0.0	0.0	0.5
Rick Mahorn	3	0	6.3	.000			1.3	0.0	0.0	0.3	0.0

Player statistics citation:

== Awards and records ==
- Derrick Coleman, All-NBA Third Team

== See also ==
- 1993–94 NBA season
