= 1993–94 Milwaukee Bucks season =

NBA professional basketball team season

- Head coach: Mike Dunleavy
- General manager: Mike Dunleavy
- Owner: Herb Kohl
- Arena: Bradley Center

Results
- Record: 20–62 (.244)
- Place: Division: 7th (Central); Conference: 13th (Eastern)
- Playoff finish: Did not qualify
- Stats at Basketball Reference

Local media
- Television: WCGV-TV; Prime Sports Upper Midwest (Jim Paschke, Jon McGlocklin)
- Radio: WTMJ

The 1993–94 Milwaukee Bucks season was the 26th season for the Milwaukee Bucks in the National Basketball Association.

== Season summary ==
=== Off-season ===
The Bucks received the eighth overall pick in the 1993 NBA draft, and selected power forward Vin Baker from the University of Hartford. During the off-season, the team signed free agent Ken Norman.

For the season, the Bucks redesigned their primary logo, replacing the color green with purple and silver to their color scheme of dark green and white. The team's primary logo featured a dark green buck with purple eyes in front of a purple triangle with a silver inline; below the buck featured the city name "Milwaukee" in silver letters on a purple rectangle, and the team name "Bucks" in silver letters with a purple outline in front of a dark green background. The team also redesigned their home and road uniforms, adding side panels to their shorts, their primary logo on the left leg, and the jersey number on the right leg. The white home uniforms featured a purple and dark green trim, and purple side panels with a dark green outline, while the road uniforms were changed from dark green to purple, and featured a dark green and white trim, and dark green side panels with a white outline.

The team's new primary logo would remain in use until 2006, while the new uniforms would last until 2001, where they would add purple, and green side panels to the sides of their home and road jerseys respectively; the basic design of the logo would remain in use until 2015.

=== Regular season ===
Despite the addition of Baker and Norman, the Bucks struggled all season long by posting a 10-game losing streak early into the regular season, and held a 14–34 record at the All-Star break. At mid-season, the team traded Frank Brickowski to the Charlotte Hornets, while second-year forward Anthony Avent was dealt to the Orlando Magic, and Danny Schayes was sold to the Los Angeles Lakers. The Bucks lost 22 of their final 25 games of the season, including a nine-game losing streak in April, finishing tied in last place in the Central Division with a franchise worst record of 20–62, a record that stood for 20 years until the 2013–14 season, where they posted a 15–67 record.

Eric Murdock averaged 15.3 points, 6.7 assists and 2.4 steals per game, while Baker averaged 13.5 points, 7.6 rebounds and 1.4 blocks per game, and was named to the NBA All-Rookie First Team, and second-year guard Todd Day provided the team with 12.7 points and 1.4 steals per game. In addition, Norman provided with 11.9 points and 6.1 rebounds per game, while Blue Edwards contributed 11.6 points per game. Off the bench, Derek Strong averaged 6.6 points and 4.2 rebounds per game, while second-year guard Jon Barry contributed 6.2 points per game, and second-year guard Lee Mayberry provided with 5.3 points and 2.6 assists per game.

During the NBA All-Star weekend at the Target Center in Minneapolis, Minnesota, Murdock participated in the NBA Three-Point Shootout; despite a stellar rookie season, and playing all 82 games during the regular season, Baker was not selected for the inaugural NBA Rookie Game. The Bucks finished 13th in the NBA in home-game attendance, with an attendance of 634,047 at the Bradley Center during the regular season.

=== Aftermath ===
Following the season, Norman was traded to the Atlanta Hawks, while Edwards and Strong were both traded to the Boston Celtics on draft day, and Brad Lohaus signed as a free agent with the Miami Heat.

== Draft picks ==
Round	Pick	Player	Position	Nationality	College
1	8	Vin Baker	PF/C	United States	Hartford

== Roster ==
1993–94 Milwaukee Bucks roster
Players

Pos.	No.	Player	Height	Weight	DOB	From
F/C	42	Vin Baker	6 ft 11 in (2.11 m)	232 lb (105 kg)	1971–11–23	Hartford
G	17	Jon Barry	6 ft 4 in (1.93 m)	195 lb (88 kg)	1969–07–25	Georgia Tech
F	00	Anthony Cook	6 ft 9 in (2.06 m)	205 lb (93 kg)	1967–03–19	Arizona
F	40	Joe Courtney	6 ft 8 in (2.03 m)	235 lb (107 kg)	1969–10–17	Southern Miss
G	10	Todd Day	6 ft 6 in (1.98 m)	188 lb (85 kg)	1970–01–07	Arkansas
G	30	Blue Edwards	6 ft 4 in (1.93 m)	200 lb (91 kg)	1965–10–31	East Carolina
C	43	Mike Gminski	6 ft 11 in (2.11 m)	250 lb (113 kg)	1959–08–03	Duke
F	54	Brad Lohaus	6 ft 11 in (2.11 m)	230 lb (104 kg)	1964–09–29	Iowa
G	11	Lee Mayberry	6 ft 1 in (1.85 m)	172 lb (78 kg)	1970–06–12	Arkansas
G	5	Eric Murdock	6 ft 1 in (1.85 m)	190 lb (86 kg)	1968–06–14	Providence
F	3	Ken Norman	6 ft 8 in (2.03 m)	215 lb (98 kg)	1964–09–05	Illinois
F	20	Derek Strong	6 ft 8 in (2.03 m)	220 lb (100 kg)	1968–02–09	Xavier

Coaches
Head coach
- Mike Dunleavy, Sr.
Assistant(s)
- Butch Carter
- Jim Eyen
- Frank Hamblen
- Larry Riley

Legend
- (DP) Unsigned draft pick
- (FA) Free agent
- (S) Suspended
- Injured

Roster

== Regular season ==
=== Season standings ===
Central Division	W	L	PCT	GB	Home	Road	Div
y-Atlanta Hawks	57	25	.695	–	36–5	21–20	21–7
x-Chicago Bulls	55	27	.671	2	31–10	24–17	21–7
x-Indiana Pacers	47	35	.573	10	29–12	18–23	15–13
x-Cleveland Cavaliers	47	35	.573	10	31–10	16–25	16–12
Charlotte Hornets	41	41	.500	16	28–13	13–28	12–16
Detroit Pistons	20	62	.244	37	10–31	10–31	4–24
Milwaukee Bucks	20	62	.244	37	11–30	9–32	9–19

#	Eastern Conference				
#	Team	W	L	PCT	GB
1	c-Atlanta Hawks	57	25	.695	–
2	y-New York Knicks	57	25	.695	–
3	x-Chicago Bulls	55	27	.671	2
4	x-Orlando Magic	50	32	.610	7
5	x-Indiana Pacers	47	35	.573	10
6	x-Cleveland Cavaliers	47	35	.573	10
7	x-New Jersey Nets	45	37	.549	12
8	x-Miami Heat	42	40	.512	15
9	Charlotte Hornets	41	41	.500	16
10	Boston Celtics	32	50	.390	25
11	Philadelphia 76ers	25	57	.305	32
12	Washington Bullets	24	58	.293	33
13	Milwaukee Bucks	20	62	.244	37
14	Detroit Pistons	20	62	.244	37

z – clinched division title
y – clinched division title
x – clinched playoff spot

=== Game log ===
1993–94 game log
Total: 20–62 (Home: 2–6; Road: 2–0)
November: 2–12 (home: 1–5; road: 1–7)

Game	Date	Team	Score	High points	High rebounds	High assists	Location Attendance	Record
1	November 5, 1993	@ Cleveland	W 94–91	Ken Norman (24)			Coliseum at Richfield; 17,102	1–0
2	November 6, 1993	Charlotte	L 103–120	Ken Norman (28)	Anthony Avent (17)	Eric Murdock, Ken Norman (7)	Bradley Center; 18,633	1–1
3	November 8, 1993	@ Boston	L 100–108				Boston Garden; 14,890	1–2
4	November 10, 1993	Chicago	L 90–91				Bradley Center; 18,633	1–3
5	November 11, 1993	@ Miami	L 103–116				Miami Arena; 15,010	1–4
6	November 13, 1993	@ New York	L 86–99				Madison Square Garden; 19,763	1–5
7	November 16, 1993	Minnesota	L 98–102				Bradley Center; 13,871	1–6
8	November 17, 1993	@ Washington	L 104–117				US Airways Arena; 6,817	1–7
9	November 20, 1993	San Antonio	L 97–101				Bradley Center; 16,365	1–8
10	November 24, 1993	Atlanta	L 85—89				Bradley Center; 14,801	1–9
11	November 26, 1993	@ Charlotte	L 99—110				Charlotte Coliseum; 23,698	1–10
11	November 27, 1993	Boston	W 89–85				Bradley Center; 15,127	2–10
12	November 29, 1993	@ San Antonio	L 95–102				Alamodome; 15,401	2–11
13	November 30, 1993	@ Houston	L 91–102				The Summit; 14,186	2–12

December: 4–4 (home: 1–3; road: 3–1)

Game	Date	Team	Score	High points	High rebounds	High assists	Location Attendance	Record
15	December 3, 1993	@ Dallas	W 107–106				Reunion Arena; 11,690	3–12
16	December 5, 1993	Phoenix	L 98–117				Bradley Center; 18,255	3–13
17	December 8, 1993	L. A. Clippers	L 97–100				Bradley Center; 13,287	3–14
18	December 10, 1993	@ Detroit	W 90–88				The Palace of Auburn Hills; 21,454	4–14
19	December 11, 1993	Philadelphia	L 86–99				Bradley Center; 16,627	4–15
20	December 13, 1993	@ Phoenix	L 104–112				America West Arena; 19,023	4–16
21	December 15, 1993	@ Sacramento	W 96–95				ARCO Arena; 17,317	5–16
22	December 17, 1993	@ Seattle	L 97–127				Seattle Center Coliseum; 14,258	5–17
23	December 19, 1993	@ Portland	L 81–93				Memorial Coliseum; 14,258	5–18
24	December 20, 1993	@ L. A. Clippers	W 105–92				Los Angeles Memorial Sports Arena; 9,553	6–18
25	December 22, 1993	Dallas	W 96–86				Bradley Center; 15,032	7–18

January: 0–3 (home: 0–3; road: 0–0)

Game	Date	Team	Score	High points	High rebounds	High assists	Location Attendance	Record
31	January 8, 1994	New Jersey	L 87–90				Bradley Center; 15,196	9–22
32	January 11, 1994	Indiana	L 76–82				Bradley Center; 13,364	9–24
33	January 13, 1994	Utah	L 83–101				Bradley Center; 13,864	9–24

February: 0–0 (home: 0–0; road: 0–0)

Game	Date	Team	Score	High points	High rebounds	High assists	Location Attendance	Record

March: 0–0 (home: 0–0; road: 0–0)

Game	Date	Team	Score	High points	High rebounds	High assists	Location Attendance	Record

April: 0–0 (home: 0–0; road: 0–0)

Game	Date	Team	Score	High points	High rebounds	High assists	Location Attendance	Record

1993–94 schedule

== Player statistics ==
Legend
GP	Games played	GS	Games started	MPG	Minutes per game
FG%	Field-goal percentage	3P%	3-point field-goal percentage	FT%	Free-throw percentage
RPG	Rebounds per game	APG	Assists per game	SPG	Steals per game
BPG	Blocks per game	PPG	Points per game

Player	GP	GS	MPG	FG%	3FG%	FT%	RPG	APG	SPG	BPG	PPG
Anthony Avent	33	20	21.1	40.4%	0.0%	77.2%	4.7	1.0	0.5	0.6	7.4
Vin Baker	82	63	31.2	50.1%	20%	56.9%	7.6	2.0	0.7	1.4	13.5
Jon Barry	72	7	17.3	41.4%	27.8%	79.5%	2.0	2.3	1.4	0.2	6.2
Frank Brickowski	43	40	33.5	48.2%	16.7%	77.5%	6.5	3.8	1.2	0.4	15.2
Anthony Cook	23	0	8.7	49.1%	0.0%	40.0%	2.4	0.2	0.1	0.5	2.7
Joe Courtney	19	0	9.3	38.6%	66.7%	60.0%	1.5	0.3	0.4	0.3	3.4
Todd Day	76	39	28.0	41.5%	22.3%	69.8%	4.1	1.8	1.4	0.7	12.7
Blue Edwards	82	64	28.3	47.8%	35.8%	79.9%	4.0	2.1	1.0	0.3	11.6
Greg Foster	3	0	6.3	57.1%	0.0%	100%	1.0	0.0	0.0	0.3	3.3
Mike Gminski	8	1	6.8	20.8%	0.0%	75.0%	1.9	0.0	0.0	0.4	1.6
Brad Lohaus	67	2	14.4	36.3%	34.3%	69.0%	2.2	0.9	0.4	0.8	4.0
Lee Mayberry	82	6	18.0	41.5%	34.5%	69.0%	1.2	2.6	0.6	0.0	5.3
Eric Murdock	82	76	30.9	46.8%	41.1%	81.3%	3.2	6.7	2.4	0.1	15.3
Ken Norman	82	75	31.0	44.8%	33.3%	50.3%	6.1	2.7	0.7	0.6	11.9
Danny Schayes	23	6	10.0	30.4%	0.0%	95.5%	2.0	0.2	0.2	0.3	2.1
Derek Strong	67	11	16.9	41.3%	23.1%	77.2%	4.2	0.7	0.6	0.2	6.6

Player statistics citation:

== Awards and records ==
- Vin Baker, NBA All-Rookie First Team

== Transactions ==
=== Trades ===
January 15, 1994
February 24, 1994
To Milwaukee Bucks----
- Anthony Cook
To Milwaukee Bucks----
- Mike Gminski
To Orlando Magic----
- Anthony Avent
To Charlotte Hornets----
- Frank Brickowski

=== Free agents ===
Player	Signed	Former team
Ken Norman	July 7, 1993	Los Angeles Clippers

Player Transactions Citation:

== See also ==
- 1993–94 NBA season – 48th NBA season
