= 1993–94 Philadelphia 76ers season =

Season of National Basketball Association team the Philadelphia 76ers

- Head coach: Fred Carter
- Arena: The Spectrum

Results
- Record: 25–57 (.305)
- Place: Division: 6th (Atlantic); Conference: 11th (Eastern)
- Playoff finish: Did not qualify
- Stats at Basketball Reference

Local media
- Television: WPHL-TV; SportsChannel Philadelphia; PRISM
- Radio: WIP

The 1993–94 Philadelphia 76ers season was the 45th season for the Philadelphia 76ers in the National Basketball Association, and their 31st season in Philadelphia, Pennsylvania.

== Season summary ==
=== Off-season ===
The 76ers received the second overall pick in the 1993 NBA draft, and selected 7' 6" center Shawn Bradley out of Brigham Young University. During the off-season, the team re-signed free agent and former 76ers All-Star forward Moses Malone, who won an NBA championship with the team in the 1983 NBA Finals, acquired Dana Barros from the Charlotte Hornets, who acquired him from the Seattle SuperSonics two days prior, signed Eric Leckner, and signed Orlando Woolridge in November.

=== Regular season ===
With the addition of Bradley and Barros, the 76ers tried to build a team around Bradley; Malone, the starting center for the 76ers from 1982 to 1986, was signed to help develop the rookie from Utah, but it was to no avail. Bradley suffered a knee injury after only just 49 games, and was out for the remainder of the regular season. The 76ers got off to a slow start losing 11 of their first 15 games, but managed to hold a 20–27 record at the All-Star break. At mid-season, the team traded Jeff Hornacek to the Utah Jazz in exchange for former All-Star guard Jeff Malone. After a 20–26 start, the 76ers suffered a 15-game losing streak between February and March, and continued to struggle as they went on an 11-game losing streak between March and April, losing 31 of their final 36 games, and finishing in sixth place in the Atlantic Division with a 25–57 record.

Second-year star Clarence Weatherspoon averaged 18.4 points, 10.1 rebounds and 1.4 blocks per game, while Malone averaged 16.8 points per game in 27 games after the trade, and Barros provided the team with 13.3 points, 5.2 assists and 1.3 steals per game, and also led them with 135 three-point field goals. In addition, Bradley averaged 10.3 points, 6.2 rebounds and 3.0 blocks per game, and was named to the NBA All-Rookie Second Team, while Woolridge contributed 12.7 points per game off the bench, and Tim Perry provided with 9.0 points and 5.1 rebounds per game. Off the bench, Johnny Dawkins contributed 6.6 points and 3.7 assists per game, while Malone averaged 5.3 points and 4.1 rebounds per game, and Leckner provided with 5.1 points and 4.0 rebounds per game.

During the NBA All-Star weekend at the Target Center in Minneapolis, Minnesota, Bradley was selected for the inaugural NBA Rookie Game, as a member of the Sensations team, while Barros participated in the NBA Three-Point Shootout for the second consecutive year. Barros also finished tied in seventh place in Most Improved Player voting, while Woolridge finished tied in sixth place in Sixth Man of the Year voting. The 76ers finished 26th in the NBA in home-game attendance, with an attendance of 491,769 at The Spectrum during the regular season, which was the second-lowest in the league.

=== Aftermath ===
Following the season, Malone was released to free agency and signed as a free agent with the San Antonio Spurs, while Dawkins signed with the Detroit Pistons, Leckner was traded to the Pistons, Woolridge retired, and head coach Fred Carter was fired.

== Offseason ==
=== Draft picks ===
| Round | Pick | Player | Position | Nationality | School/Club team |
|---|---|---|---|---|---|
| 1 | 2 | Shawn Bradley | Center | United States | BYU |
| 2 | 32 | Alphonso Ford | Shooting Guard | United States | Mississippi Valley State |

== Roster ==
1993–94 Philadelphia 76ers roster
Players

| Pos. | No. | Player | Height | Weight | DOB | From |
|---|---|---|---|---|---|---|
| C | 30 | Isaac Austin | 6 ft 10 in (2.08 m) | 255 lb (116 kg) | 1969–08–18 | Arizona State |
| G | 3 | Dana Barros | 5 ft 11 in (1.80 m) | 163 lb (74 kg) | 1967–04–13 | Boston College |
| C | 76 | Shawn Bradley (injured) | 7 ft 6 in (2.29 m) | 235 lb (107 kg) | 1972–03–22 | BYU |
| G | 12 | Johnny Dawkins | 6 ft 2 in (1.88 m) | 165 lb (75 kg) | 1963–09–28 | Duke |
| G | 20 | Greg Graham | 6 ft 4 in (1.93 m) | 174 lb (79 kg) | 1970–11–26 | Indiana |
| F | 43 | Warren Kidd | 6 ft 9 in (2.06 m) | 235 lb (107 kg) | 1970–09–09 | Middle Tennessee |
| C | 45 | Eric Leckner | 6 ft 11 in (2.11 m) | 265 lb (120 kg) | 1966–03–27 | Wyoming |
| G | 25 | Jeff Malone | 6 ft 4 in (1.93 m) | 205 lb (93 kg) | 1961–06–28 | Mississippi State |
| C | 2 | Moses Malone | 6 ft 10 in (2.08 m) | 215 lb (98 kg) | 1955–03–23 | Petersburg HS (VA) |
| F | 23 | Tim Perry | 6 ft 9 in (2.06 m) | 200 lb (91 kg) | 1965–06–04 | Temple |
| F | 35 | Clarence Weatherspoon | 6 ft 6 in (1.98 m) | 240 lb (109 kg) | 1970–09–08 | Southern Miss |
| F | 0 | Orlando Woolridge | 6 ft 9 in (2.06 m) | 215 lb (98 kg) | 1959–12–16 | Notre Dame |

Coaches
Head coach
- Fred Carter
Assistant(s)
- Tony DiLeo
- Jeff Ruland

Legend
- (DP) Unsigned draft pick
- (FA) Free agent
- (S) Suspended
- Injured

Roster

== Regular season ==
=== Season standings ===
| Atlantic Division | W | L | PCT | GB | Home | Road | Div |
|---|---|---|---|---|---|---|---|
| y-New York Knicks | 57 | 25 | .695 | — | 32–9 | 25–16 | 18–10 |
| x-Orlando Magic | 50 | 32 | .610 | 7 | 31–10 | 19–22 | 20–8 |
| x-New Jersey Nets | 45 | 37 | .549 | 12 | 29–12 | 16–25 | 17–11 |
| x-Miami Heat | 42 | 40 | .512 | 15 | 22–19 | 20–21 | 16–12 |
| Boston Celtics | 32 | 50 | .390 | 25 | 18–23 | 14–27 | 12–16 |
| Philadelphia 76ers | 25 | 57 | .305 | 32 | 15–26 | 10–31 | 7–21 |
| Washington Bullets | 24 | 58 | .293 | 33 | 17–24 | 7–34 | 8–20 |

| # | Eastern Conference | | | | |
| # | Team | W | L | PCT | GB |
|---|---|---|---|---|---|
| 1 | c-Atlanta Hawks | 57 | 25 | .695 | – |
| 2 | y-New York Knicks | 57 | 25 | .695 | – |
| 3 | x-Chicago Bulls | 55 | 27 | .671 | 2 |
| 4 | x-Orlando Magic | 50 | 32 | .610 | 7 |
| 5 | x-Indiana Pacers | 47 | 35 | .573 | 10 |
| 6 | x-Cleveland Cavaliers | 47 | 35 | .573 | 10 |
| 7 | x-New Jersey Nets | 45 | 37 | .549 | 12 |
| 8 | x-Miami Heat | 42 | 40 | .512 | 15 |
| 9 | Charlotte Hornets | 41 | 41 | .500 | 16 |
| 10 | Boston Celtics | 32 | 50 | .390 | 25 |
| 11 | Philadelphia 76ers | 25 | 57 | .305 | 32 |
| 12 | Washington Bullets | 24 | 58 | .293 | 33 |
| 13 | Milwaukee Bucks | 20 | 62 | .244 | 37 |
| 14 | Detroit Pistons | 20 | 62 | .244 | 37 |

z - clinched division title
y - clinched division title
x - clinched playoff spot

== Player statistics ==
Legend
| GP | Games played | GS | Games started | MPG | Minutes per game |
| FG% | Field-goal percentage | 3P% | 3-point field-goal percentage | FT% | Free-throw percentage |
| RPG | Rebounds per game | APG | Assists per game | SPG | Steals per game |
| BPG | Blocks per game | PPG | Points per game |

=== Regular season ===
| Player | GP | GS | MPG | FG% | 3P% | FT% | RPG | APG | SPG | BPG | PPG |
|---|---|---|---|---|---|---|---|---|---|---|---|
| Isaac Austin | 14 | 0 | 14.4 | .439 | .000 | .609 | 4.9 | 1.2 | .4 | .7 | 5.1 |
| Dana Barros | 81 | 70 | 31.1 | .469 | .381 | .800 | 2.4 | 5.2 | 1.3 | .1 | 13.3 |
| Manute Bol^{†} | 4 | 0 | 12.3 | .429 | | | 1.5 | .0 | .5 | 2.3 | 1.5 |
| Shawn Bradley | 49 | 45 | 28.3 | .409 | .000 | .607 | 6.2 | 2.0 | .9 | 3.0 | 10.3 |
| Michael Curry | 10 | 0 | 4.3 | .214 | .000 | .750 | .1 | .1 | .1 | .0 | .9 |
| Johnny Dawkins | 72 | 12 | 18.7 | .418 | .352 | .840 | 1.7 | 3.7 | .9 | .1 | 6.6 |
| Bill Edwards | 3 | 0 | 14.7 | .111 | .000 | .400 | 4.7 | 1.3 | 1.0 | .3 | 2.0 |
| Greg Graham | 70 | 6 | 12.7 | .400 | .080 | .836 | 1.2 | .9 | .9 | .1 | 4.8 |
| Sean Green^{†} | 35 | 0 | 9.5 | .346 | .244 | .722 | 1.0 | .5 | .5 | .2 | 4.3 |
| Jeff Hornacek^{†} | 53 | 53 | 37.6 | .455 | .313 | .873 | 4.0 | 5.9 | 1.8 | .2 | 16.6 |
| Warren Kidd | 68 | 14 | 13.0 | .592 | | .547 | 3.4 | .3 | .3 | .3 | 3.6 |
| Eric Leckner | 71 | 36 | 16.4 | .486 | .000 | .646 | 4.0 | 1.2 | .3 | .5 | 5.1 |
| Jeff Malone^{†} | 27 | 23 | 33.4 | .481 | .667 | .809 | 3.1 | 2.2 | .5 | .0 | 16.8 |
| Moses Malone | 55 | 0 | 11.2 | .440 | .000 | .769 | 4.1 | .6 | .2 | .3 | 5.3 |
| Tim Perry | 80 | 68 | 29.2 | .435 | .365 | .580 | 5.1 | 1.2 | .8 | 1.0 | 9.0 |
| Clarence Weatherspoon | 82 | 82 | 38.4 | .483 | .235 | .693 | 10.1 | 2.3 | 1.2 | 1.4 | 18.4 |
| Orlando Woolridge | 74 | 1 | 26.4 | .471 | .071 | .689 | 4.0 | 1.9 | .6 | .8 | 12.7 |

- ^{†} Denotes player spent time with another team in the season. Stats reflect time with the 7ers only.

Player statistics citation:

== Awards and records ==
- Shawn Bradley, NBA All-Rookie Team 2nd Team

== See also ==
- 1993-94 NBA season
