= 1993–94 Charlotte Hornets season =

NBA professional basketball team season

- Head coach: Allan Bristow
- General manager: Dave Twardzik
- Owner: George Shinn
- Arena: Charlotte Coliseum

Results
- Record: 41–41 (.500)
- Place: Division: 5th (Central); Conference: 9th (Eastern)
- Playoff finish: Did not qualify
- Stats at Basketball Reference

Local media
- Television: SportSouth; WJZY
- Radio: WBT

The 1993–94 Charlotte Hornets season was the sixth season for the Charlotte Hornets in the National Basketball Association.

== Season summary ==
=== Off-season ===
During the off-season, the Hornets acquired Hersey Hawkins from the Philadelphia 76ers, and acquired Eddie Johnson from the Seattle SuperSonics.

=== Regular season ===
Coming off of their first ever playoff appearance, and with the addition of Hawkins and Eddie Johnson, the Hornets won eight of their first twelve games of the regular season, but then posted a five-game losing streak between November and December afterwards. In December, the team traded Johnny Newman to the New Jersey Nets in exchange for Rumeal Robinson. The Hornets soon struggled posting an eight-game losing streak between January and February, falling below .500 in winning percentage, and holding a 22–25 record at the All-Star break. The team dealt with injuries as Larry Johnson only played 51 games due to a back injury, and second-year star Alonzo Mourning only appeared in 60 games due to a torn calf muscle, and a sprained ankle.

At mid-season, the Hornets traded Mike Gminski to the Milwaukee Bucks in exchange for Frank Brickowski, and signed free agent Marty Conlon, but released him to free agency after 16 games, as he later on signed with the Washington Bullets. The team lost ten of their eleven games in February, and posted another eight-game losing streak between February and March, losing 16 of their 17 games between January 25 and March 5, 1994. The Hornets won 18 of their final 26 games of the season, and finished in fifth place in the Central Division with a 41–41 record; however, the team failed to qualify for the NBA playoffs after finishing just one game behind the 8th–seeded Miami Heat.

Mourning averaged 21.5 points, 10.2 rebounds and 3.1 blocks per game, while Larry Johnson averaged 16.4 points, 8.8 rebounds and 3.6 assists per game, and sixth man Dell Curry provided the team with 16.3 points per game, led them with 152 three-point field goals off the bench, and was named the NBA Sixth Man of the Year. In addition, Hawkins provided the team with 14.4 points and 1.6 steals per game, while Eddie Johnson contributed 11.5 points per game, and Muggsy Bogues provided with 10.8 points, 10.1 assists and 1.7 steals per game. Meanwhile, Kenny Gattison averaged 7.7 points and 4.6 rebounds per game off the bench, and David Wingate contributed 6.2 points per game.

During the NBA All-Star weekend at the Target Center in Minneapolis, Minnesota, Mourning was selected for the 1994 NBA All-Star Game, as a member of the Eastern Conference All-Star team; it was his first ever All-Star selection, but he did not participate due to injury. Meanwhile, Curry participated in the NBA Three-Point Shootout. The Hornets led the NBA in home-game attendance for the fifth time in six seasons, with an attendance of 971,609 at the Charlotte Coliseum during the regular season.

=== Aftermath ===
Following the season, Eddie Johnson left to play overseas in Greece, while Brickowski signed as a free agent with the Sacramento Kings, and Robinson was released to free agency.

== Draft picks ==
Round	Pick	Player	Position	Nationality	College
1	17	Greg Graham	SG	United States	Indiana
1	20	Scott Burrell	SG/SF	United States	Connecticut

== Roster ==
1993–94 Charlotte Hornets roster
Players

Pos.	No.	Player	Height	Weight	DOB	From
G	25	Tony Bennett	6 ft 0 in (1.83 m)	175 lb (79 kg)	1969–06–01	Green Bay
G	1	Muggsy Bogues	5 ft 3 in (1.60 m)	136 lb (62 kg)	1965–01–09	Wake Forest
C	40	Frank Brickowski	6 ft 9 in (2.06 m)	240 lb (109 kg)	1959–08–14	Penn State
F	24	Scott Burrell	6 ft 7 in (2.01 m)	218 lb (99 kg)	1971–01–12	Connecticut
G	30	Dell Curry	6 ft 4 in (1.93 m)	190 lb (86 kg)	1964–06–25	Virginia Tech
C	43	LeRon Ellis	6 ft 9 in (2.06 m)	225 lb (102 kg)	1969–04–28	Syracuse
F	44	Kenny Gattison	6 ft 8 in (2.03 m)	225 lb (102 kg)	1964–05–23	Old Dominion
G	32	Hersey Hawkins	6 ft 3 in (1.91 m)	190 lb (86 kg)	1966–09–29	Bradley
G	12	Steve Henson	5 ft 11 in (1.80 m)	177 lb (80 kg)	1968–02–02	Kansas State
F	8	Eddie Johnson	6 ft 7 in (2.01 m)	215 lb (98 kg)	1959–05–01	Illinois
F	2	Larry Johnson	6 ft 6 in (1.98 m)	250 lb (113 kg)	1969–03–14	UNLV
C	33	Alonzo Mourning	6 ft 10 in (2.08 m)	240 lb (109 kg)	1970–02–08	Georgetown
G	20	Rumeal Robinson	6 ft 2 in (1.88 m)	195 lb (88 kg)	1966–11–13	Michigan
F	55	David Wingate	6 ft 5 in (1.96 m)	185 lb (84 kg)	1963–12–15	Georgetown

Coaches
Head coach
- Allan Bristow
Assistant(s)
- T. R. Dunn
- Bill Hanzlik

Legend
- (DP) Unsigned draft pick
- (FA) Free agent
- (S) Suspended
- Injured

Roster
Updated: March 24, 1994

== Regular season ==
=== Season standings ===
Central Division	W	L	PCT	GB	Home	Road	Div
y-Atlanta Hawks	57	25	.695	–	36–5	21–20	21–7
x-Chicago Bulls	55	27	.671	2	31–10	24–17	21–7
x-Indiana Pacers	47	35	.573	10	29–12	18–23	15–13
x-Cleveland Cavaliers	47	35	.573	10	31–10	16–25	16–12
Charlotte Hornets	41	41	.500	16	28–13	13–28	12–16
Detroit Pistons	20	62	.244	37	10–31	10–31	4–24
Milwaukee Bucks	20	62	.244	37	11–30	9–32	9–19

#	Eastern Conference				
#	Team	W	L	PCT	GB
1	c-Atlanta Hawks	57	25	.695	–
2	y-New York Knicks	57	25	.695	–
3	x-Chicago Bulls	55	27	.671	2
4	x-Orlando Magic	50	32	.610	7
5	x-Indiana Pacers	47	35	.573	10
6	x-Cleveland Cavaliers	47	35	.573	10
7	x-New Jersey Nets	45	37	.549	12
8	x-Miami Heat	42	40	.512	15
9	Charlotte Hornets	41	41	.500	16
10	Boston Celtics	32	50	.390	25
11	Philadelphia 76ers	25	57	.305	32
12	Washington Bullets	24	58	.293	33
13	Milwaukee Bucks	20	62	.244	37
14	Detroit Pistons	20	62	.244	37

z - clinched division title
y - clinched division title
x - clinched playoff spot

== Game log ==
=== Regular season ===
1993–94 game log
Total: 41–41 (home: 28–13; road: 13–28)
November: 8–5 (home: 5–1; road: 3–4)

Game	Date	Team	Score	High points	High rebounds	High assists	Location Attendance	Record
1	November 5, 1993	Chicago	L 123–124 (OT)				Charlotte Coliseum	0–1
2	November 6, 1993	@ Milwaukee	W 120–103				Bradley Center	1–1
3	November 9, 1993	@ Cleveland	L 108–113				Richfield Coliseum	1–2
4	November 11, 1993	Orlando	W 120–87				Charlotte Coliseum	2–2
5	November 12, 1993	@ Boston	W 110–107				Boston Garden	3–2
6	November 16, 1993	@ Indiana	W 102–93				Market Square Arena	4–2
7	November 17, 1993	Sacramento	W 130–113				Charlotte Coliseum	5–2
8	November 19, 1993	Washington	W 127–111				Charlotte Coliseum	6–2
9	November 20, 1993	@ Atlanta	L 91–96				The Omni	6–3
10	November 23, 1993	@ Washington	L 98–118				USAir Arena	6–4
11	November 24, 1993	L.A. Lakers	W 141–124				Charlotte Coliseum	7–4
12	November 26, 1993	Milwaukee	W 110–99				Charlotte Coliseum	8–4
13	November 27, 1993	@ Miami	L 100–114				Miami Arena	8–5

December: 8–7 (home: 7–1; road: 1–6)

Game	Date	Team	Score	High points	High rebounds	High assists	Location Attendance	Record
14	December 1, 1993	San Antonio	L 88–92				Charlotte Coliseum	8–6
15	December 3, 1993	@ Denver	L 94–102				McNichols Sports Arena	8–7
16	December 4, 1993	@ Utah	L 108–122				Delta Center	8–8
17	December 7, 1993	@ Houston	L 102–121				The Summit	8–9
18	December 9, 1993	Cleveland	W 95–93				Charlotte Coliseum	9–9
19	December 11, 1993	New Jersey	W 105–99				Charlotte Coliseum	10–9
20	December 14, 1993	Minnesota	W 101–85				Charlotte Coliseum	11–9
21	December 16, 1993	@ New Jersey	L 95–111				Brendan Byrne Arena	11–10
22	December 17, 1993	Denver	W 99–96				Charlotte Coliseum	12–10
23	December 20, 1993	@ Chicago	L 97–109				Chicago Stadium	12–11
24	December 21, 1993	@ Detroit	W 108–97				The Palace of Auburn Hills	13–11
25	December 23, 1993	Boston	W 118–100				Charlotte Coliseum	14–11
26	December 27, 1993	Detroit	W 109–94				Charlotte Coliseum	15–11
27	December 28, 1993	@ Cleveland	L 115–127 (OT)				Richfield Coliseum	15–12
28	December 30, 1993	Chicago	W 115–95				Charlotte Coliseum	16–12

January: 6–8 (home: 3–3; road: 3–5)

Game	Date	Team	Score	High points	High rebounds	High assists	Location Attendance	Record
29	January 2, 1994	@ New York	W 124–123 (OT)				Madison Square Garden	17–12
30	January 4, 1994	@ Atlanta	L 94–133				The Omni	17–13
31	January 6, 1994	Portland	L 110–116				Charlotte Coliseum	17–14
32	January 8, 1994	New York	W 102–99				Charlotte Coliseum	18–14
33	January 11, 1994	@ Phoenix	W 95–93				America West Arena	19–14
34	January 13, 1994	@ Sacramento	L 104–115				ARCO Arena	19–15
35	January 14, 1994	@ L.A. Lakers	W 130–122				Great Western Forum	20–15
36	January 16, 1994	@ Portland	L 101–106				Memorial Coliseum	20–16
37	January 19, 1994	Philadelphia	W 115–103				Charlotte Coliseum	21–16
38	January 21, 1994	@ Milwaukee	L 110–113				Bradley Center	21–17
39	January 22, 1994	Milwaukee	W 91–80				Charlotte Coliseum	22–17
40	January 25, 1994	@ Miami	L 98–119				Miami Arena	22–18
41	January 26, 1994	Orlando	L 120–145				Charlotte Coliseum	22–19
42	January 28, 1994	Atlanta	L 105–117				Charlotte Coliseum	22–20

February: 1–10 (home: 1–6; road: 0–4)

Game	Date	Team	Score	High points	High rebounds	High assists	Location Attendance	Record
43	February 2, 1994	Indiana	L 112–124				Charlotte Coliseum	22–21
44	February 4, 1994	Miami	L 118–124				Charlotte Coliseum	22–22
45	February 5, 1994	@ Indiana	L 102–111				Market Square Arena	22–23
46	February 7, 1994	@ Philadelphia	L 117–125				The Spectrum	22–24
47	February 9, 1994	Golden State	L 116–126				Charlotte Coliseum	22–25
All-Star Break
48	February 16, 1994	Houston	W 102–97				Charlotte Coliseum	23–25
49	February 18, 1994	Milwaukee	L 99–106				Charlotte Coliseum	23–26
50	February 20, 1994	Cleveland	L 101–105 (OT)				Charlotte Coliseum	23–27
51	February 21, 1994	@ Chicago	L 93–118				Chicago Stadium	23–28
52	February 24, 1994	Dallas	L 110–115				Charlotte Coliseum	23–29
53	February 27, 1994	@ Orlando	L 103–114				Orlando Arena	23–30

March: 7–7 (home: 6–1; road: 1–6)

Game	Date	Team	Score	High points	High rebounds	High assists	Location Attendance	Record
54	March 1, 1994	@ Seattle	L 96–112				Seattle Center Coliseum	23–31
55	March 2, 1994	@ L.A. Clippers	L 109–118				Los Angeles Memorial Sports Arena	23–32
56	March 5, 1994	@ Golden State	L 112–129				Oakland–Alameda County Coliseum Arena	23–33
57	March 8, 1994	Phoenix	W 97–89				Charlotte Coliseum	24–33
58	March 11, 1994	@ Minnesota	W 97–91				Target Center	25–33
59	March 12, 1994	@ New Jersey	L 92–117				Brendan Byrne Arena	25–34
60	March 14, 1994	Boston	W 107–101 (OT)				Charlotte Coliseum	26–34
61	March 16, 1994	Atlanta	W 92–79				Charlotte Coliseum	27–34
62	March 18, 1994	Utah	W 82–78				Charlotte Coliseum	28–34
63	March 20, 1994	Seattle	L 115–124				Charlotte Coliseum	28–35
64	March 22, 1994	Philadelphia	W 125–91				Charlotte Coliseum	29–35
65	March 23, 1994	@ Atlanta	L 92–100				The Omni	29–36
66	March 25, 1994	@ Detroit	W 106–92				The Palace of Auburn Hills	30–36
67	March 26, 1994	L.A. Clippers	W 121–109				Charlotte Coliseum	31–36
68	March 29, 1994	@ New York	L 95–106				Madison Square Garden	31–37

April: 10–4 (home: 6–1; road: 4–3)

Game	Date	Team	Score	High points	High rebounds	High assists	Location Attendance	Record
69	April 1, 1994	@ Dallas	W 106–104				Reunion Arena	32–37
70	April 2, 1994	@ San Antonio	L 111–117				Alamodome	32–38
71	April 5, 1994	@ Cleveland	L 99–105				Richfield Coliseum	32–39
72	April 6, 1994	Indiana	W 129–90				Charlotte Coliseum	33–39
73	April 8, 1994	New Jersey	W 99–78				Charlotte Coliseum	34–39
74	April 9, 1994	@ Philadelphia	W 127–122 (OT)				The Spectrum	35–39
75	April 11, 1994	Miami	W 99–97				Charlotte Coliseum	36–39
76	April 14, 1994	@ Orlando	W 112–108				Orlando Arena	37–39
77	April 15, 1994	Chicago	L 85–88				Charlotte Coliseum	37–40
78	April 17, 1994	New York	W 107–91				Charlotte Coliseum	38–40
79	April 20, 1994	Washington	W 117–111				Charlotte Coliseum	39–40
80	April 21, 1994	@ Boston	W 95–89				Boston Garden	40–40
81	April 23, 1994	Detroit	W 108–103				Charlotte Coliseum	41–40
82	April 24, 1994	@ Washington	L 99–117				USAir Arena	41–41

1993–94 schedule

== Player statistics ==
=== Regular season ===
Player	POS	GP	GS	MP	REB	AST	STL	BLK	PTS	MPG	RPG	APG	SPG	BPG	PPG
Hersey Hawkins	SG	82	82	2,648	377	216	135	22	1,180	32.3	4.6	2.6	1.6	.3	14.4
Dell Curry	SG	82	0	2,173	262	221	98	27	1,335	26.5	3.2	2.7	1.2	.3	16.3
Muggsy Bogues	PG	77	77	2,746	313	780	133	2	835	35.7	4.1	10.1	1.7	.0	10.8
Kenny Gattison	PF	77	18	1,644	358	95	59	46	592	21.4	4.6	1.2	.8	.6	7.7
Tony Bennett	PG	74	5	983	90	163	39	1	248	13.3	1.2	2.2	.5	.0	3.4
Eddie Johnson	SF	73	27	1,460	224	125	36	8	836	20.0	3.1	1.7	.5	.1	11.5
Alonzo Mourning	C	60	59	2,018	610	86	27	188	1,287	33.6	10.2	1.4	.5	3.1	21.5
Larry Johnson	PF	51	51	1,757	448	184	29	14	834	34.5	8.8	3.6	.6	.3	16.4
Scott Burrell	SF	51	16	767	132	62	37	16	244	15.0	2.6	1.2	.7	.3	4.8
David Wingate	SF	50	36	1,005	134	104	42	6	310	20.1	2.7	2.1	.8	.1	6.2
LeRon Ellis	C	50	1	680	188	24	17	25	221	13.6	3.8	.5	.3	.5	4.4
Frank Brickowski^{†}	C	28	6	653	125	57	28	11	282	23.3	4.5	2.0	1.0	.4	10.1
Mike Gminski^{†}	C	21	6	255	59	11	13	13	73	12.1	2.8	.5	.6	.6	3.5
Johnny Newman^{†}	SF	18	18	429	58	29	18	5	234	23.8	3.2	1.6	1.0	.3	13.0
Marty Conlon^{†}	C	16	8	378	89	28	5	7	163	23.6	5.6	1.8	.3	.4	10.2
Rumeal Robinson^{†}	PG	14	0	95	8	18	3	0	30	6.8	.6	1.3	.2	.0	2.1
Tim Kempton^{†}	PF	9	0	103	14	6	4	1	25	11.4	1.6	.7	.4	.1	2.8
Steve Henson	PG	3	0	17	1	5	0	0	3	5.7	.3	1.7	.0	.0	1.0
Lorenzo Williams^{†}	PF	1	0	19	4	0	1	2	0	19.0	4.0	.0	1.0	2.0	.0

- ^{†} Denotes player spent time with another team in the season. Stats reflect time with the Hornets only.

== Awards and records ==
- Dell Curry, NBA Sixth Man of the Year Award

== Transactions ==
- September 1, 1993

Traded Kendall Gill and a 1994 1st round draft pick (Carlos Rogers was later selected) to the Seattle SuperSonics for Dana Barros, Eddie Johnson and a 1994 1st round draft pick (Sharone Wright was later selected).

- September 3, 1993

Traded Dana Barros, Greg Graham, Sidney Green and a 1994 1st round draft pick (Sharone Wright was later selected) to the Philadelphia 76ers for Hersey Hawkins.

- September 23, 1993

Signed LeRon Ellis as a free agent.

- November 6, 1993

Signed Steve Henson as a free agent.

- December 10, 1993

Traded Johnny Newman to the New Jersey Nets for Rumeal Robinson.

- January 1, 1994

Signed Lorenzo Williams as a free agent.

- January 5, 1994

Waived Lorenzo Williams.

- February 2, 1994

Signed Marty Conlon to the first of two 10-day contracts.

- February 16, 1994

Signed Tim Kempton to the first of two 10-day contracts.

- February 24, 1994

Traded Mike Gminski and a 1997 1st round draft pick (Paul Grant was later selected) to the Milwaukee Bucks for Frank Brickowski.

- February 25, 1994

Signed Marty Conlon to a contract for the rest of the season.

- March 22, 1994

Waived Marty Conlon.

- March 24, 1994

Marty Conlon claimed on waivers by the Washington Bullets.

Player Transactions Citation:

== See also ==
- 1993-94 NBA season
