= 1993–94 Boston Celtics season =

NBA basketball team season

- Head coach: Chris Ford
- General manager: M.L. Carr
- Arena: Boston Garden; Hartford Civic Center

Results
- Record: 32–50 (.390)
- Place: Division: 5th (Atlantic); Conference: 10th (Eastern)
- Playoff finish: Did not qualify
- Stats at Basketball Reference

Local media
- Television: WSBK-TV; WBZ-TV; SportsChannel New England
- Radio: WEEI

The 1993–94 Boston Celtics season was the 48th season for the Boston Celtics in the National Basketball Association.

== Season summary ==
=== Off-season ===
Tragedy struck the Celtics during the off-season when star guard, and team captain Reggie Lewis died of cardiac arrest during practice at the age of 27 on July 27, 1993; Lewis previously collapsed during Game 1 of the Eastern Conference First Round against the Charlotte Hornets in the 1993 NBA playoffs. Two years later, the Celtics would retire his #35 jersey during a game against the Chicago Bulls at the Boston Garden on March 22, 1995. Croatian rookie power forward Dino Radja, who was drafted by the Celtics as the 40th overall pick in the 1989 NBA draft, made his debut in the NBA this season.

=== Regular season ===
Despite the loss of Lewis, and with the addition of Radja, the Celtics won six of their first eight games of the regular season, and played above .500 in winning percentage with an 11–10 start to the season. However, the team soon fell below .500 posting a seven-game losing streak in December afterwards, but later on posted a seven-game winning streak in January, and held a 20–27 record at the All-Star break. However, the Celtics suffered a 13-game losing streak between February and March, which included a winless month in February, where the team lost all of their twelve games during that month. The Celtics posted a six-game losing streak in March, and finished in fifth place in the Atlantic Division with a disappointing 32–50 record; this season marked the first since 1978–79 that the team failed to qualify for the NBA playoffs (a streak of 14 seasons). The absence of Lewis, and the retirements over the previous two seasons of Larry Bird, and Kevin McHale contributed to the poor season.

Dee Brown averaged 15.5 points, 4.5 assists and 2.0 steals per game, while Radja averaged 15.1 points and 7.2 rebounds per game, and was named to the NBA All-Rookie Second Team, and Sherman Douglas provided the team with 13.3 points and 8.8 assists per game. In addition, long-time Celtics center Robert Parish averaged 11.7 points and 7.3 rebounds per game, while Kevin Gamble provided with 11.5 points per game, and Rick Fox contributed 10.8 points per game. Off the bench, Xavier McDaniel averaged 11.3 points and 4.9 rebounds per game, while first-round draft pick Acie Earl contributed 5.5 points and 3.3 rebounds per game, and Ed Pinckney provided with 5.2 points and 6.3 rebounds per game.

During the NBA All-Star weekend at the Target Center in Minneapolis, Minnesota, Radja was selected for the inaugural NBA Rookie Game, as a member of the Phenoms team. The Celtics finished 19th in the NBA in home-game attendance, with an attendance of 604,867 at the Boston Garden during the regular season.

=== Aftermath ===
Following the season, Parish signed as a free agent with the Charlotte Hornets, while Gamble signed with the Miami Heat, and Pinckney was traded to the Milwaukee Bucks on draft day.

== Draft picks ==
Round	Pick	Player	Position	Nationality	College
1	19	Acie Earl	C	United States	Iowa

== Roster ==
1993–94 Boston Celtics roster
Players

Pos.	No.	Player	Height	Weight	DOB	From
C	4	Alaa Abdelnaby	6 ft 10 in (2.08 m)	240 lb (109 kg)	1968–06–24	Duke
G	7	Dee Brown	6 ft 1 in (1.85 m)	160 lb (73 kg)	1968–11–29	Jacksonville
G	12	Chris Corchiani	6 ft 0 in (1.83 m)	185 lb (84 kg)	1968–03–28	NC State
G	20	Sherman Douglas	6 ft 0 in (1.83 m)	180 lb (82 kg)	1966–09–15	Syracuse
C	55	Acie Earl	6 ft 10 in (2.08 m)	240 lb (109 kg)	1970–06–23	Iowa
F	44	Rick Fox	6 ft 7 in (2.01 m)	230 lb (104 kg)	1969–07–24	North Carolina
F	34	Kevin Gamble	6 ft 5 in (1.96 m)	210 lb (95 kg)	1965–11–13	Iowa
G	43	Harris, Tony	6 ft 3 in (1.91 m)	190 lb (86 kg)	1967–05–13	LSU New Orleans
G	30	Todd Lichti	6 ft 4 in (1.93 m)	205 lb (93 kg)	1967–01–08	Stanford
F	31	Xavier McDaniel	6 ft 7 in (2.01 m)	205 lb (93 kg)	1963–06–03	Wichita State
G	27	Jimmy Oliver	6 ft 5 in (1.96 m)	205 lb (93 kg)	1969–07–12	Purdue
C	00	Robert Parish	7 ft 0 in (2.13 m)	230 lb (104 kg)	1953–08–30	Centenary
F	54	Ed Pinckney	6 ft 9 in (2.06 m)	195 lb (88 kg)	1963–03–27	Villanova
F	40	Dino Radja	6 ft 11 in (2.11 m)	225 lb (102 kg)	1967–04–24	Croatia
C	50	Matt Wenstrom	7 ft 1 in (2.16 m)	250 lb (113 kg)	1970–11–04	North Carolina

Coaches
Head coach
- Chris Ford
Assistant(s)
- Don Casey
- Jon Jennings
- Dennis Johnson

Legend
- (DP) Unsigned draft pick
- (FA) Free agent
- (S) Suspended
- Injured

Roster

=== Roster Notes ===
- Center Alaa Abdelnaby holds both American and Egyptian citizenship.

== Regular season ==
=== Season standings ===
Atlantic Division	W	L	PCT	GB	Home	Road	Div
y-New York Knicks	57	25	.695	—	32–9	25–16	18–10
x-Orlando Magic	50	32	.610	7	31–10	19–22	20–8
x-New Jersey Nets	45	37	.549	12	29–12	16–25	17–11
x-Miami Heat	42	40	.512	15	22–19	20–21	16–12
Boston Celtics	32	50	.390	25	18–23	14–27	12–16
Philadelphia 76ers	25	57	.305	32	15–26	10–31	7–21
Washington Bullets	24	58	.293	33	17–24	7–34	8–20

#	Eastern Conference				
#	Team	W	L	PCT	GB
1	c-Atlanta Hawks	57	25	.695	–
2	y-New York Knicks	57	25	.695	–
3	x-Chicago Bulls	55	27	.671	2
4	x-Orlando Magic	50	32	.610	7
5	x-Indiana Pacers	47	35	.573	10
6	x-Cleveland Cavaliers	47	35	.573	10
7	x-New Jersey Nets	45	37	.549	12
8	x-Miami Heat	42	40	.512	15
9	Charlotte Hornets	41	41	.500	16
10	Boston Celtics	32	50	.390	25
11	Philadelphia 76ers	25	57	.305	32
12	Washington Bullets	24	58	.293	33
13	Milwaukee Bucks	20	62	.244	37
14	Detroit Pistons	20	62	.244	37

== Player statistics ==
Legend
GP	Games played	GS	Games started	MPG	Minutes per game
FG%	Field-goal percentage	3P%	3-point field-goal percentage	FT%	Free-throw percentage
RPG	Rebounds per game	APG	Assists per game	SPG	Steals per game
BPG	Blocks per game	PPG	Points per game

=== Regular season ===
Boston Celtics statistics
Player	GP	GS	MPG	FG%	3P%	FT%	RPG	APG	SPG	BPG	PPG
Alaa Abdelnaby	13	0	12.2	.436		.640	3.5	.2	.2	.2	4.9
Dee Brown	77	76	37.2	.480	.313	.831	3.9	4.5	2.0	.6	15.5
Chris Corchiani	51	0	9.2	.426	.289	.684	.9	1.7	.4	.0	2.3
Sherman Douglas	78	78	35.8	.462	.232	.641	2.5	8.8	1.1	.1	13.3
Acie Earl	74	8	15.5	.406	.000	.675	3.3	.2	.3	.7	5.5
Rick Fox	82	53	25.6	.467	.330	.757	4.3	2.6	1.0	.6	10.8
Kevin Gamble	75	28	25.1	.458	.243	.817	2.1	2.0	.8	.3	11.5
Tony Harris	5	0	17.6	.290	.333	.920	2.0	1.6	.8	.0	8.8
Todd Lichti^{†}	4	0	12.0	.429		.500	2.0	1.5	1.3	.3	4.8
Xavier McDaniel	82	5	24.0	.461	.244	.676	4.9	1.5	.6	.5	11.3
Jimmy Oliver	44	6	12.3	.416	.406	.758	1.0	.8	.4	.0	4.9
Robert Parish	74	74	26.9	.491		.740	7.3	1.1	.6	1.3	11.7
Ed Pinckney	76	35	20.1	.522		.736	6.3	.8	.8	.6	5.2
Dino Rađa	80	47	28.8	.521	.000	.751	7.2	1.4	.9	.8	15.1
Matt Wenstrom	11	0	3.4	.600		.600	1.1	.0	.0	.2	1.6

- ^{†} Denotes player spent time with another team in the season. Stats reflect time with the Celtics only.

Player statistics citation:

== Awards and records ==
- Dino Radja, NBA All-Rookie Team 2nd Team

== Transactions ==
=== Additions ===
Player	Signed	Former Team
Jimmy Oliver		Pescanova Ferrol
Chris Corchiani		

== See also ==
- 1993–94 NBA season
