= 1993–94 Cleveland Cavaliers season =

NBA professional basketball team season

- Head coach: Mike Fratello
- Arena: Richfield Coliseum

Results
- Record: 47–35 (.573)
- Place: Division: 4th (Central); Conference: 6th (Eastern)
- Playoff finish: First round (lost to Bulls 0–3)
- Stats at Basketball Reference

Local media
- Television: SportsChannel Ohio · WOIO
- Radio: WWWE

The 1993–94 Cleveland Cavaliers season was the 24th season for the Cleveland Cavaliers in the National Basketball Association.

== Season summary ==
=== Off-season ===
The Cavaliers had the 22nd overall pick in the 1993 NBA draft, and selected small forward Chris Mills from the University of Arizona, acquired Tyrone Hill from the Golden State Warriors during the off-season, and signed free agent Rod Higgins in December. The team also hired Mike Fratello as their new head coach.

=== Regular season ===
Under Fratello, and with the addition of Hill and Mills, the Cavaliers got off to a 6–6 start to the regular season, but then struggled losing eight of their next nine games, and falling below .500 in winning percentage with a 7–14 start to the season. However, the team soon recovered playing above .500 for the remainder of the season, and holding a 24–23 record at the All-Star break. The team dealt with injuries as Brad Daugherty only played just 50 games due to a back injury, while Larry Nance only appeared in just 33 games due to a knee injury, and Hill only played 57 games due to thumb and knee injuries. Despite the injuries, the Cavaliers posted an 11-game winning streak between February and March, and finished in fourth place in the Central Division with a 47–35 record, earning the sixth seed in the Eastern Conference.

Mark Price averaged 17.3 points, 7.8 assists and 1.4 steals per game, led the Cavaliers with 118 three-point field goals, and was named to the All-NBA Third Team. In addition, Daugherty averaged 17.0 points and 10.2 rebounds per game, while Gerald Wilkins provided the team with 14.3 points and 1.3 steals per game, Hot Rod Williams contributed 13.7 points, 7.6 rebounds and 1.7 blocks per game, Nance provided with 11.2 points, 6.9 rebounds and 1.7 blocks per game, and Hill contributed 10.6 points and 8.8 rebounds per game. Meanwhile, Mills averaged 9.4 points and 5.1 rebounds per game off the bench, while Bobby Phills became the team's starting shooting guard, averaging 8.3 points per game, Terrell Brandon provided with 8.3 points and 3.8 assists per game off the bench, and John Battle contributed 6.6 points per game also off the bench.

During the NBA All-Star weekend at the Target Center in Minneapolis, Minnesota, Price was selected for the 1994 NBA All-Star Game, as a member of the Eastern Conference All-Star team; it was his fourth and final All-Star appearance. In addition, Price won the NBA Three-Point Shootout for the second consecutive year, while Mills was selected for the inaugural NBA Rookie Game, as a member of the Sensations team. Price also finished in ninth place in Most Valuable Player voting.

The Cavaliers finished eighth in the NBA in home-game attendance, with an attendance of 753,686 at the Coliseum at Richfield during the regular season.

=== NBA playoffs ===
In the Eastern Conference First Round of the 1994 NBA playoffs, and for the third consecutive year, the Cavaliers faced off against the 3rd–seeded, and 3-time defending NBA champion Chicago Bulls; All-Star guard Michael Jordan had retired prior to the season to pursue a baseball career, as the Bulls were now led by the All-Star trio of Scottie Pippen, Horace Grant and B.J. Armstrong. However, during the final month of the regular season, Williams suffered a season-ending right thumb injury; without Daugherty, Nance and Williams, the Cavaliers lacked big men on the team for their first-round series against the Bulls. The Cavaliers lost the first two games to the Bulls on the road at the Chicago Stadium, before losing Game 3 at home in overtime, 95–92 at the Coliseum at Richfield, thus losing the series in a three-game sweep.

=== Aftermath ===
This was also the Cavaliers' final season in which they played their home games at the Coliseum at Richfield in Richfield, Ohio. Following the season, Nance retired after thirteen seasons in the NBA, and Higgins was released to free agency; this was also Daugherty's final season of his NBA career, as he would miss all of the next two seasons due to back injuries.

== Draft picks ==
Round	Pick	Player	Position	Nationality	School/Club team
1	22	Chris Mills	Forward	United States	Arizona

== Roster ==
1993–94 Cleveland Cavaliers roster
Players

Pos.	No.	Player	Height	Weight	DOB	From
F	16	Gary Alexander	6 ft 7 in (2.01 m)	240 lb (109 kg)	1969–11–01	South Florida
G	10	John Battle	6 ft 2 in (1.88 m)	175 lb (79 kg)	1962–11–09	Rutgers
G	11	Terrell Brandon	5 ft 11 in (1.80 m)	180 lb (82 kg)	1970–05–20	Oregon
C	43	Brad Daugherty	7 ft 0 in (2.13 m)	245 lb (111 kg)	1965–10–19	North Carolina
F	35	Danny Ferry	6 ft 10 in (2.08 m)	230 lb (104 kg)	1966–10–17	Duke
C	54	Jay Guidinger	6 ft 10 in (2.08 m)	255 lb (116 kg)	1969–08–18	Minnesota Duluth
F	23	Rod Higgins	6 ft 7 in (2.01 m)	200 lb (91 kg)	1960–01–31	Fresno State
F	32	Tyrone Hill	6 ft 9 in (2.06 m)	240 lb (109 kg)	1968–03–19	Xavier
F	8	Tim Kempton	6 ft 10 in (2.08 m)	245 lb (111 kg)	1964–01–25	Notre Dame
G	12	Gerald Madkins	6 ft 4 in (1.93 m)	200 lb (91 kg)	1969–04–18	UCLA
F	24	Chris Mills	6 ft 6 in (1.98 m)	215 lb (98 kg)	1970–01–25	Arizona
F	22	Larry Nance	6 ft 10 in (2.08 m)	205 lb (93 kg)	1959–02–12	Clemson
G	14	Bobby Phills	6 ft 5 in (1.96 m)	210 lb (95 kg)	1969–12–20	Southern
G	25	Mark Price	6 ft 0 in (1.83 m)	170 lb (77 kg)	1964–02–15	Georgia Tech
G/F	21	Gerald Wilkins	6 ft 6 in (1.98 m)	185 lb (84 kg)	1963–09–11	Chattanooga
F/C	18	Hot Rod Williams	6 ft 11 in (2.11 m)	215 lb (98 kg)	1962–08–09	Tulane

Coaches
Head coach
- Mike Fratello
Assistant(s)
- Richie Adubato
- Jim Boylan
- Ron Rothstein

Legend
- (DP) Unsigned draft pick
- (FA) Free agent
- (S) Suspended
- Injured

Roster
Updated: April 15, 1994

== Regular season ==
=== Season standings ===
Central Division	W	L	PCT	GB	Home	Road	Div
y-Atlanta Hawks	57	25	.695	–	36–5	21–20	21–7
x-Chicago Bulls	55	27	.671	2	31–10	24–17	21–7
x-Indiana Pacers	47	35	.573	10	29–12	18–23	15–13
x-Cleveland Cavaliers	47	35	.573	10	31–10	16–25	16–12
Charlotte Hornets	41	41	.500	16	28–13	13–28	12–16
Detroit Pistons	20	62	.244	37	10–31	10–31	4–24
Milwaukee Bucks	20	62	.244	37	11–30	9–32	9–19

y - clinched division title
x - clinched playoff spot

#	Eastern Conference				
#	Team	W	L	PCT	GB
1	c-Atlanta Hawks	57	25	.695	–
2	y-New York Knicks	57	25	.695	–
3	x-Chicago Bulls	55	27	.671	2
4	x-Orlando Magic	50	32	.610	7
5	x-Indiana Pacers	47	35	.573	10
6	x-Cleveland Cavaliers	47	35	.573	10
7	x-New Jersey Nets	45	37	.549	12
8	x-Miami Heat	42	40	.512	15
9	Charlotte Hornets	41	41	.500	16
10	Boston Celtics	32	50	.390	25
11	Philadelphia 76ers	25	57	.305	32
12	Washington Bullets	24	58	.293	33
13	Milwaukee Bucks	20	62	.244	37
14	Detroit Pistons	20	62	.244	37

z - clinched division title
y - clinched division title
x - clinched playoff spot

== Game log ==
1993–94 game log
Total: 47–35 (home: 31–10; road: 16–25)
November: 6–6 (home: 4–2; road: 2–4)

Game	Date	Team	Score	High points	High rebounds	High assists	Location Attendance	Record
1	November 5, 1993	Milwaukee						
2	November 7, 1993	New York						
3	November 9, 1993	Charlotte						
4	November 11, 1993	@ Seattle						
5	November 12, 1993	@ Golden State						
6	November 14, 1993	@ L.A. Lakers						
7	November 16, 1993	@ Portland						
8	November 18, 1993	@ Denver						
9	November 20, 1993	@ Phoenix						
10	November 24, 1993	Washington						
11	November 27, 1993	Seattle						
12	November 30, 1993	Detroit						

December: 6–9 (home: 6–3; road: 0–6)

Game	Date	Team	Score	High points	High rebounds	High assists	Location Attendance	Record
13	December 1, 1993	@ New Jersey						
14	December 4, 1993	Orlando						
15	December 5, 1993	Houston						
16	December 7, 1993	Portland						
17	December 9, 1993	@ Charlotte						
18	December 11, 1993	@ Chicago						
19	December 14, 1993; 7:30 pm EST	Atlanta	L 92–103	Williams (18)	Daugherty (14)	Brandon (7)	Richfield Coliseum; 17,022	7–12
20	December 16, 1993	@ Miami						
21	December 18, 1993	@ Detroit						
22	December 19, 1993	L.A. Lakers						
23	December 21, 1993	Utah						
24	December 23, 1993	Milwaukee						
25	December 26, 1993	Indiana						
26	December 28, 1993	Charlotte						
27	December 30, 1993	@ Milwaukee						

January: 9–6 (home: 4–2; road: 5–4)

Game	Date	Team	Score	High points	High rebounds	High assists	Location Attendance	Record
28	January 4, 1994	@ Indiana						
29	January 5, 1994	Boston						
30	January 7, 1994	@ Boston						
31	January 8, 1994; 7:30 pm EST	@ Atlanta	L 89–102	Wilkins (19)	Daugherty, Nance (10)	Price (9)	The Omni; 16,368	13–18
32	January 12, 1994	@ Orlando						
33	January 13, 1994	New Jersey						
34	January 15, 1994	Philadelphia						
35	January 17, 1994	Orlando						
36	January 19, 1994	@ Utah						
37	January 21, 1994	@ L.A. Clippers						
38	January 22, 1994	@ Sacramento						
39	January 25, 1994	@ Houston						
40	January 27, 1994	Chicago						
41	January 29, 1994	Miami						
42	January 31, 1994	@ Detroit						

February: 11–3 (home: 6–2; road: 5–1)

Game	Date	Team	Score	High points	High rebounds	High assists	Location Attendance	Record
43	February 2, 1994	@ Philadelphia						
44	February 3, 1994	San Antonio						
45	February 5, 1994; 7:30 pm EST	Atlanta	W 109–93	Williams (19)	Nance (13)	Price (13)	Richfield Coliseum; 20,273	23–22
46	February 8, 1994	New Jersey						
47	February 9, 1994	@ New Jersey						
48	February 15, 1994	Denver						
49	February 17, 1994	New York						
50	February 18, 1994	@ Minnesota						
51	February 20, 1994	@ Charlotte						
52	February 22, 1994	Minnesota						
53	February 23, 1994	@ Washington						
54	February 25, 1994	Golden State						
55	February 26, 1994	Dallas						
56	February 28, 1994	@ Chicago						

March: 8–7 (home: 6–1; road: 2–6)

Game	Date	Team	Score	High points	High rebounds	High assists	Location Attendance	Record
57	March 2, 1994	@ Boston						
58	March 3, 1994	Philadelphia						
59	March 6, 1994	Chicago						
60	March 8, 1994	Sacramento						
61	March 11, 1994	@ Detroit						
62	March 12, 1994	@ New York						
63	March 15, 1994	Phoenix						
64	March 18, 1994	@ Orlando						
65	March 19, 1994	@ Miami						
66	March 22, 1994	Indiana						
67	March 23, 1994	@ Indiana						
68	March 25, 1994	@ Philadelphia						
69	March 27, 1994	Detroit						
70	March 29, 1994	L.A. Clippers						
71	March 31, 1994	@ San Antonio						

April: 7–4 (home: 5–0; road: 2–4)

Game	Date	Team	Score	High points	High rebounds	High assists	Location Attendance	Record
72	April 2, 1994	@ Dallas						
73	April 5, 1994	Charlotte						
74	April 7, 1994	@ New York						
75	April 8, 1994	@ Washington						
76	April 12, 1994	Milwaukee						
77	April 13, 1994; 7:30 pm EDT	@ Atlanta	L 95–110	Brandon (16)	Phills (8)	Brandon (5)	The Omni; 13,675	43–34
78	April 15, 1994	Miami						
79	April 16, 1994	@ Milwaukee						
80	April 20, 1994	@ Indiana						
81	April 22, 1994	Washington						
82	April 24, 1994	Boston						

1993–94 schedule

== Playoffs ==
1994 playoff game log
Eastern Conference First Round: 0–3 (home: 0–1; road: 0–2)

Game	Date	Team	Score	High points	High rebounds	High assists	Location Attendance	Series
1	April 29	@ Chicago	L 96–104	Gerald Wilkins (23)	Tyrone Hill (8)	Mark Price (5)	Chicago Stadium; 18,676	0–1
2	May 1	@ Chicago	L 96–105	Gerald Wilkins (28)	Tyrone Hill (10)	Price, Phills (4)	Chicago Stadium; 18,676	0–2
3	May 3	Chicago	L 92–95 (OT)	Chris Mills (25)	Tyrone Hill (13)	Gerald Wilkins (7)	Richfield Coliseum; 17,778	0–3

1994 schedule

== Player stats ==
Legend
GP	Games played	GS	Games started	MPG	Minutes per game
FG%	Field-goal percentage	3P%	3-point field-goal percentage	FT%	Free-throw percentage
RPG	Rebounds per game	APG	Assists per game	SPG	Steals per game
BPG	Blocks per game	PPG	Points per game

=== Regular season ===
Player	GP	GS	MPG	FG%	3P%	FT%	RPG	APG	SPG	BPG	PPG
Mark Price	76	73	31.4	47.8	39.7	88.8	3.0	7.8	1.4	0.1	17.3
Brad Daugherty	50	50	36.8	48.8	0.0	78.5	10.2	3.0	0.8	0.7	17.0
Gerald Wilkins	82	82	33.8	45.7	39.6	77.6	3.7	3.1	1.3	0.5	14.3
Hot Rod Williams	76	72	35.0	47.8	0.0	72.8	7.6	2.5	1.0	1.7	13.7
Larry Nance	33	19	27.5	48.7	0.0	75.3	6.9	1.5	0.8	1.7	11.2
Tyrone Hill	57	20	25.4	54.3	0.0	66.8	8.8	0.8	0.9	0.6	10.6
Chris Mills	79	18	25.6	41.9	31.1	77.8	5.1	1.6	0.7	0.6	9.4
Bobby Phills	72	53	21.3	47.1	8.3	72.0	2.9	1.8	0.9	0.2	8.3
Terrell Brandon	73	10	21.2	42.0	21.9	85.8	2.2	3.8	1.2	0.2	8.3
John Battle	51	1	16.0	47.6	26.3	75.3	0.8	1.6	0.4	0.0	6.6
Rod Higgins	36	11	15.2	43.6	44.0	73.8	2.3	1.0	0.7	0.4	5.4
Danny Ferry	70	1	13.8	44.6	27.5	88.4	2.0	1.1	0.4	0.3	5.0
Tim Kempton	4	0	8.3	50.0	0.0	33.3	2.5	0.8	0.5	0.3	3.5
Gary Alexander	7	0	6.1	58.3	0.0	42.9	1.7	0.1	0.4	0.0	2.4
Gerald Madkins	22	0	6.8	35.5	33.3	80.0	0.5	0.9	0.4	0.0	1.6
Jay Guidinger	32	0	4.1	50.0	0.0	71.4	1.0	0.1	0.1	0.2	1.5
Sedric Toney	12	0	5.3	16.7	0.0	100.0	0.3	0.9	0.0	0.0	0.5

=== Playoffs ===
Player	GP	GS	MPG	FG%	3P%	FT%	RPG	APG	SPG	BPG	PPG
Gerald Wilkins	3	3	42.0	44.4	43.8	87.5	4.3	3.3	1.0	0.0	20.3
Chris Mills	3	1	37.3	50.0	80.0	81.8	7.7	2.7	2.3	0.3	17.0
Mark Price	3	3	34.0	34.9	22.2	92.9	2.0	4.7	1.3	0.0	15.0
Tyrone Hill	3	3	41.0	40.7	0.0	54.1	10.3	1.3	0.3	0.3	14.0
Tim Kempton	3	1	29.7	40.0	0.0	100.0	5.3	2.7	1.0	0.0	8.7
Terrell Brandon	3	0	18.7	63.2	0.0	66.7	1.3	1.7	0.3	0.0	8.7
Bobby Phills	3	2	22.7	37.5	100.0	50.0	4.7	2.3	0.7	0.0	6.7
Rod Higgins	3	2	19.0	36.4	28.6	50.0	1.3	1.3	0.3	0.3	3.7
John Battle	1	0	8.0	100.0	0.0	0.0	2.0	0.0	0.0	0.0	2.0
Danny Ferry	1	0	4.0	0.0	0.0	0.0	0.0	1.0	0.0	0.0	0.0

Player statistics citation:
