= 1993–94 Seattle SuperSonics season =

NBA basketball team season

- Division champions
- Head coach: George Karl
- General manager: Bob Whitsitt
- Arena: Seattle Center Coliseum

Results
- Record: 63–19 (.768)
- Place: Division: 1st (Pacific); Conference: 1st (Western)
- Playoff finish: West First Round (lost to Nuggets 2–3)
- Stats at Basketball Reference

Local media
- Television: KSTW; Prime Sports Northwest
- Radio: KJR

The 1993–94 Seattle SuperSonics season was the 26th season for the Seattle SuperSonics in the National Basketball Association.

== Season summary ==
=== Off-season ===
During the off-season, the SuperSonics acquired All-Star forward, and 2-time Sixth Man of the Year Detlef Schrempf from the Indiana Pacers, and acquired Kendall Gill from the Charlotte Hornets.

=== Regular season ===
With the addition of Schrempf and Gill, the SuperSonics got off to a fast start by winning their first ten games of the regular season. The team got off to a 26–3 start to the season, and later on held a league-best 35–10 record at the All-Star break. The SuperSonics posted a nine-game winning streak between March and April, won 17 of their final 19 games of the season, and finished in first place in the Pacific Division with a league-best 63–19 record, earning the first seed in the Western Conference for the first time since the 1978–79 season, where they won their first NBA championship.

Shawn Kemp averaged 18.1 points, 10.8 rebounds, 1.8 steals and 2.1 blocks per game, and was named to the All-NBA Second Team, while Gary Payton averaged 16.5 points, 6.0 assists and 2.3 steals per game, and was named to the All-NBA Third Team, and to the NBA All-Defensive First Team, and Schrempf provided the team with 15.0 points and 5.6 rebounds per game. In addition, Ricky Pierce contributed 14.5 points per game off the bench, but only played 51 games due to a left foot injury, while Gill provided with 14.1 points, 3.5 assists and 1.9 steals per game, and Sam Perkins averaged 12.3 points and 4.5 rebounds per game. Meanwhile, Vincent Askew contributed 9.1 points per game off the bench, defensive sixth man Nate McMillan provided with 6.0 points, 5.3 assists and 3.0 steals per game also off the bench, and was named to the NBA All-Defensive Second Team, and Michael Cage averaged 4.6 points and 5.4 rebounds per game.

During the NBA All-Star weekend at the Target Center in Minneapolis, Minnesota, Kemp and Payton were both selected for the 1994 NBA All-Star Game, as members of the Western Conference All-Star team, while head coach George Karl was selected to coach the Western Conference; it was Payton's first ever All-Star appearance. In addition, Kemp also participated in the NBA Slam Dunk Contest for the fourth time. Payton finished in sixth place in Most Valuable Player voting, while Kemp finished tied in seventh place, and McMillan finished in second place in Sixth Man of the Year voting, behind Dell Curry of the Charlotte Hornets, and with Pierce finishing in fourth place. Payton finished in fifth place in Defensive Player of the Year voting, while McMillan finished tied in seventh place; Payton also finished in third place in Most Improved Player voting, with Askew finishing tied in seventh place, and Karl finished in third place in Coach of the Year voting.

The SuperSonics finished 20th in the NBA in home-game attendance, with an attendance of 601,369 at the Seattle Center Coliseum during the regular season.

=== NBA playoffs ===
In the Western Conference First Round of the 1994 NBA playoffs, the SuperSonics faced off against the 8th–seeded Denver Nuggets, a team that featured defensive shot-blocker Dikembe Mutombo, Mahmoud Abdul-Rauf, and second-year star LaPhonso Ellis. The SuperSonics won the first two games over the Nuggets at home at the Seattle Center Coliseum, and took a 2–0 series lead. However, the team lost the next two games on the road, which included a Game 4 loss to the Nuggets at the McNichols Sports Arena in overtime, 94–85, as the Nuggets evened the series at 2–2. The SuperSonics would not make it past the first round, losing Game 5 to the Nuggets at the Seattle Center Coliseum in overtime, 98–94, this losing in a hard-fought five-game series; it was the first time in NBA playoffs history that a #8 seed defeated a #1 seeded team.

=== Aftermath ===
Following the season, Pierce was traded to the Golden State Warriors after feuding with Payton, and Cage signed as a free agent with the Cleveland Cavaliers.

== Offseason ==
=== Draft picks ===
Round	Pick	Player	Position	Nationality	College
1	23	Ervin Johnson	C	United States	New Orleans
2	42	Adonis Jordan	PG	United States	Kansas

== Roster ==
1993–94 Seattle SuperSonics roster
Players

Pos.	No.	Player	Height	Weight	DOB	From
G	17	Vincent Askew	6 ft 6 in (1.98 m)	210 lb (95 kg)	1966–02–28	Memphis
C	44	Michael Cage	6 ft 9 in (2.06 m)	224 lb (102 kg)	1962–01–28	San Diego State
G	13	Kendall Gill	6 ft 5 in (1.96 m)	195 lb (88 kg)	1968–05–25	Illinois
C	50	Ervin Johnson	6 ft 11 in (2.11 m)	245 lb (111 kg)	1967–12–21	LSU New Orleans
F	40	Shawn Kemp	6 ft 10 in (2.08 m)	230 lb (104 kg)	1969–11–26	Trinity Valley CC
F	35	Chris King	6 ft 8 in (2.03 m)	215 lb (98 kg)	1969–07–24	Wake Forest
C	25	Rich King	7 ft 2 in (2.18 m)	260 lb (118 kg)	1969–04–04	Nebraska
G	10	Nate McMillan	6 ft 5 in (1.96 m)	195 lb (88 kg)	1964–08–03	NC State
G	20	Gary Payton	6 ft 4 in (1.93 m)	180 lb (82 kg)	1968–07–23	Oregon State
F	14	Sam Perkins	6 ft 9 in (2.06 m)	235 lb (107 kg)	1961–06–14	North Carolina
G	22	Ricky Pierce	6 ft 4 in (1.93 m)	205 lb (93 kg)	1959–08–19	Rice
C	55	Steve Scheffler	6 ft 9 in (2.06 m)	250 lb (113 kg)	1967–09–03	Purdue
F	11	Detlef Schrempf	6 ft 10 in (2.08 m)	215 lb (98 kg)	1963–01–21	Washington

Coaches
Head coach
- George Karl
Assistant(s)
- Tim Grgurich
- Bob Kloppenburg

Legend
- (DP) Unsigned draft pick
- (FA) Free agent
- (S) Suspended
- Injured

=== 1993–94 Salaries ===
Player	1993–94 Salary
Sam Perkins	$3,587,000
Gary Payton	$2,383,000
Ricky Pierce	$2,100,000
Kendall Gill	$2,000,000
Michael Cage	$1,502,000
Detlef Schrempf	$1,308,000
Nate McMillan	$850,000
Shawn Kemp	$750,000
Rich King	$700,000
Ervin Johnson	$617,000
Steve Scheffler	$170,000
TOTAL	$15,967,000

Sources:

- Basketball Reference: 1993-94 SEA Salaries

== Regular season ==
=== Season standings ===
Pacific Division	W	L	PCT	GB	Home	Road	Div
y-Seattle SuperSonics	63	19	.768	—	37–4	26–15	25–5
x-Phoenix Suns	56	26	.683	7	36–5	20–21	19–11
x-Golden State Warriors	50	32	.610	13	29–12	21–20	19–11
x-Portland Trail Blazers	47	35	.573	16	30–11	17–24	17–13
Los Angeles Lakers	33	49	.402	30	21–20	12–29	7–23
Sacramento Kings	28	54	.341	35	20–21	8–33	9–21
Los Angeles Clippers	27	55	.329	36	17–24	10–31	9–21

#	Western Conference				
#	Team	W	L	PCT	GB
1	z-Seattle SuperSonics	63	19	.768	–
2	y-Houston Rockets	58	24	.707	5
3	x-Phoenix Suns	56	26	.683	7
4	x-San Antonio Spurs	55	27	.671	8
5	x-Utah Jazz	53	29	.646	10
6	x-Golden State Warriors	50	32	.610	13
7	x-Portland Trail Blazers	47	35	.573	16
8	x-Denver Nuggets	42	40	.512	21
9	Los Angeles Lakers	33	49	.402	30
10	Sacramento Kings	28	54	.341	35
11	Los Angeles Clippers	27	55	.329	36
12	Minnesota Timberwolves	20	62	.244	43
13	Dallas Mavericks	13	69	.159	50

=== Game log ===
1993–94 game log
Total: 63–19 (home: 37–4; road: 26–15)
November: 11–1 (home: 6–0; road: 5–1)

Game	Date	Team	Score	High points	High rebounds	High assists	Location Attendance	Record
1	November 6	L.A. Lakers	W 129–101	Shawn Kemp (30)	Shawn Kemp (14)	Nate McMillan (11)	Seattle Center Coliseum; 14,813	1–0
2	November 8	@ Utah	W 101–100	Ricky Pierce (16)	Michael Cage (7)	Gary Payton (6)	Delta Center; 19,911	2–0
3	November 9	Denver	W 118–86	Sam Perkins (28)	Shawn Kemp (11)	Detlef Schrempf (8)	Seattle Center Coliseum; 14,253	3–0
4	November 11	Cleveland	W 115–102	Schrempf & Pierce (22)	Shawn Kemp (9)	Nate McMillan (6)	Seattle Center Coliseum; 14,813	4–0
5	November 13	Atlanta	W 97–89 (OT)	Sam Perkins (22)	Shawn Kemp (13)	Nate McMillan (8)	Seattle Center Coliseum; 14,813	5–0
6	November 16	Chicago	W 95–94	Ricky Pierce (19)	Shawn Kemp (7)	Nate McMillan (10)	Seattle Center Coliseum; 14,813	6–0
7	November 19	Dallas	W 116–87	Shawn Kemp (24)	Shawn Kemp (9)	Kemp & Gill (5)	Seattle Center Coliseum; 14,253	7–0
8	November 20	@ Golden State	W 112–97	Shawn Kemp (28)	Shawn Kemp (12)	McMillan & Payton (7)	Oakland-Alameda County Coliseum Arena; 15,025	8–0
9	November 24	@ Sacramento	W 120–93	Gary Payton (23)	Shawn Kemp (15)	Nate McMillan (11)	ARCO Arena; 17,317	9–0
10	November 26	@ Minnesota	W 110–92	Ricky Pierce (28)	Sam Perkins (9)	Nate McMillan (11)	Target Center; 18,298	10–0
11	November 27	@ Cleveland	L 90–101	Payton & Kemp (26)	Shawn Kemp (14)	Nate McMillan (7)	Richfield Coliseum; 20,273	10–1
12	November 30	@ Philadelphia	W 92–80	Sam Perkins (21)	Shawn Kemp (15)	Gill & Payton (7)	The Spectrum; 13,193	11–1

December : 11–2 (home: 7–1; road: 4–1)

Game	Date	Team	Score	High points	High rebounds	High assists	Location Attendance	Record
13	December 2	@ Washington	W 105–95	Gill & Payton (18)	Sam Perkins (8)	Gary Payton (6)	US Airways Arena; 18,756	12–1
14	December 4	Minnesota	W 99–82	Sam Perkins (22)	Shawn Kemp (10)	Detlef Schrempf (5)	Seattle Center Coliseum; 14,693	13–1
15	December 6	Washington	W 103–96	Kemp & Gill (18)	Shawn Kemp (9)	Gary Payton (11)	Seattle Center Coliseum; 14,253	14–1
16	December 8	@ San Antonio	W 109–107 (OT)	Gary Payton (25)	Shawn Kemp (7)	Nate McMillan (7)	Alamodome; 18,184	15–1
17	December 9	@ Dallas	W 125–93	Kendall Gill (23)	Detlef Schrempf (8)	Nate McMillan (7)	Reunion Arena; 13,112	16–1
18	December 11	@ Houston	L 75–82	Detlef Schrempf (17)	Shawn Kemp (12)	Gary Payton (4)	The Summit; 16,611	16–2
19	December 14	Orlando	W 124–100	Ricky Pierce (24)	Ervin Johnson (10)	Gary Payton (9)	Seattle Center Coliseum; 14,813	17–2
20	December 17	Milwaukee	W 127–97	Ricky Pierce (21)	Ervin Johnson (9)	Schrempf & McMillan (7)	Seattle Center Coliseum; 14,258	18–2
21	December 18	Golden State	W 126–111	Ricky Pierce (26)	Detlef Schrempf (8)	Gary Payton (8)	Seattle Center Coliseum; 14,813	19–2
22	December 21	Indiana	W 91–88	Sam Perkins (23)	Detlef Schrempf (11)	Nate McMillan (7)	Seattle Center Coliseum; 14,580	20–2
23	December 23	Phoenix	L 86–87	Detlef Schrempf (16)	Michael Cage (12)	Nate McMillan (8)	Seattle Center Coliseum; 14,813	20–3
24	December 28	Houston	W 112–97	Payton & Pierce (25)	Michael Cage (11)	Nate McMillan (9)	Seattle Center Coliseum; 14,813	21–3
25	December 29	@ L.A. Lakers	W 99–92	Shawn Kemp (25)	Michael Cage (10)	Gary Payton (9)	Great Western Forum; 15,599	22–3

January : 9–6 (home: 5–2; road: 4–4)

Game	Date	Team	Score	High points	High rebounds	High assists	Location Attendance	Record
26	January 4	@ Phoenix	W 112–106	Shawn Kemp (22)	Nate McMillan (9)	Gary Payton (8)	America West Arena; 19,023	23–3
27	January 5	@ L.A. Clippers	W 106–98	Shawn Kemp (22)	Shawn Kemp (15)	Gary Payton (8)	Los Angeles Sports Arena; 11,838	24–3
28	January 7	Sacramento	W 102–93	Detlef Schrempf (20)	Shawn Kemp (8)	Gary Payton (8)	Seattle Center Coliseum; 14,709	25–3
29	January 8	Utah	W 108–87	Three-Way Tie (16)	Michael Cage (9)	Nate McMillan (10)	Seattle Center Coliseum; 14,813	26–3
30	January 11	@ Portland	L 99–108	Payton & Schrempf (19)	Gary Payton (7)	Gary Payton (8)	Memorial Coliseum; 12,888	26–4
31	January 14	@ Golden State	L 100–121	Ricky Pierce (18)	Shawn Kemp (9)	Nate McMillan (4)	Oakland-Alameda County Coliseum Arena; 15,025	26–5
32	January 15	Miami	W 97–78	Shawn Kemp (25)	Shawn Kemp (14)	Payton & McMillan (4)	Seattle Center Coliseum; 14,787	27–5
33	January 18	L.A. Lakers	W 103–88	Kendall Gill (19)	Detlef Schrempf (11)	Gary Payton (9)	Seattle Center Coliseum; 14,627	28–5
34	January 19	@ Sacramento	W 114–95	Gary Payton (24)	Michael Cage (9)	Gary Payton (8)	ARCO Arena; 17,317	29–5
35	January 21	@ Dallas	W 91–87	Detlef Schrempf (22)	Shawn Kemp (12)	Gary Payton (8)	Reunion Arena; 14,101	30–5
36	January 22	@ Denver	L 91–98	Shawn Kemp (26)	Shawn Kemp (12)	Gary Payton (5)	McNichols Sports Arena; 17,171	30–6
37	January 24	@ Utah	L 90–95	Gary Payton (18)	Shawn Kemp (14)	Gary Payton (7)	Delta Center; 19,911	30–7
38	January 25	L.A. Clippers	L 103–111	Detlef Schrempf (19)	Detlef Schrempf (12)	Gary Payton (7)	Seattle Center Coliseum; 14,348	30–8
39	January 27	New Jersey	W 102–92	Gary Payton (21)	Shawn Kemp (11)	Schrempf & McMillan (5)	Seattle Center Coliseum; 14,490	31–8
40	January 29	New York	L 92–106	Gary Payton (19)	Kemp & Cage (8)	Payton & McMillan (5)	Seattle Center Coliseum; 14,813	31–9

February : 8–5 (home: 3–0; road: 5–5)

Game	Date	Team	Score	High points	High rebounds	High assists	Location Attendance	Record
41	February 1	@ New Jersey	L 103–104	Shawn Kemp (26)	Shawn Kemp (12)	Schrempf & McMillan (7)	Brendan Byrne Arena; 16,213	31–10
42	February 2	@ Boston	W 97–84	Detlef Schrempf (21)	Shawn Kemp (11)	Nate McMillan (8)	Boston Garden; 14,890	32–10
43	February 4	@ Detroit	W 108–84	Kendall Gill (18)	Shawn Kemp (11)	Gary Payton (9)	The Palace of Auburn Hills; 21,454	33–10
44	February 5	@ Milwaukee	W 115–94	Detlef Schrempf (18)	Kemp & Cage (9)	Gary Payton (10)	Bradley Center; 18,633	34–10
45	February 9	Portland	W 115–94	Gary Payton (19)	Shawn Kemp (19)	Gary Payton (9)	Seattle Center Coliseum; 14,813	35–10
All-Star Break
46	February 15	Philadelphia	W 133–105	Shawn Kemp (24)	Shawn Kemp (13)	Nate McMillan (8)	Seattle Center Coliseum; 14,496	36–10
47	February 17	@ Miami	L 112–115	Schrempf & Kemp (22)	Shawn Kemp (12)	Gary Payton (5)	Miami Arena; 15,200	36–11
48	February 18	@ Orlando	L 93–124	Kendall Gill (20)	Gary Payton (8)	Nate McMillan (6)	Orlando Arena; 15,291	36–12
49	February 20	@ Indiana	L 95–101	Sam Perkins (24)	Shawn Kemp (10)	Nate McMillan (9)	Market Square Arena; 16,586	36–13
50	February 22	@ New York	W 93–82	Shawn Kemp (21)	Shawn Kemp (17)	Payton & Askew (8)	Madison Square Garden; 19,763	37–13
51	February 23	@ Atlanta	L 92–99	Gary Payton (23)	Shawn Kemp (15)	Shawn Kemp (6)	The Omni; 16,368	37–14
52	February 25	Boston	W 115–102	Kendall Gill (25)	Shawn Kemp (13)	Vincent Askew (7)	Seattle Center Coliseum; 14,813	38–14
53	February 27	@ L.A. Clippers	W 122–118	Shawn Kemp (27)	Shawn Kemp (14)	Gary Payton (8)	Los Angeles Sports Arena; 15,080	39–14

March : 14–3 (home: 9–1; road: 5–2)

Game	Date	Team	Score	High points	High rebounds	High assists	Location Attendance	Record
54	March 1	Charlotte	W 112–96	Kendall Gill (21)	Shawn Kemp (10)	Four players (5)	Seattle Center Coliseum; 14,813	40–14
55	March 5	Sacramento	W 114–98	Shawn Kemp (25)	Shawn Kemp (14)	Gary Payton (8)	Seattle Center Coliseum; 14,677	41–14
56	March 6	@ Sacramento	W 102–85	Gary Payton (24)	Shawn Kemp (11)	Nate McMillan (6)	ARCO Arena; 17,317	42–14
57	March 8	Golden State	W 113–98	Shawn Kemp (24)	Shawn Kemp (14)	Kendall Gill (10)	Seattle Center Coliseum; 14,624	43–14
58	March 10	@ Houston	L 82–87	Gary Payton (19)	Schrempf & Kemp (11)	Detlef Schrempf (4)	The Summit; 16,611	43–15
59	March 11	@ San Antonio	W 100–99	Shawn Kemp (23)	Sam Perkins (8)	Gary Payton (9)	Alamodome; 20,640	44–15
60	March 13	Portland	W 114–102	Kendall Gill (23)	Michael Cage (17)	Payton & McMillan (8)	Seattle Center Coliseum; 14,813	45–15
61	March 15	Detroit	L 87–89	Shawn Kemp (24)	Shawn Kemp (11)	Nate McMillan (9)	Seattle Center Coliseum; 14,679	45–16
62	March 17	@ Minnesota	W 107–92	Shawn Kemp (21)	Shawn Kemp (14)	Gary Payton (6)	Target Center; 17,581	46–16
63	March 18	@ Chicago	L 84–87	Kendall Gill (23)	Shawn Kemp (9)	Gary Payton (6)	Chicago Stadium; 18,676	46–17
64	March 20	@ Charlotte	W 124–115	Gary Payton (32)	Kemp & Schrempf (11)	Shawn Kemp (12)	Charlotte Coliseum; 23,698	47–17
65	March 22	San Antonio	W 105–89	Sam Perkins (27)	Shawn Kemp (14)	McMillan & Payton (6)	Seattle Center Coliseum; 14,813	48–17
66	March 24	Phoenix	W 116–106	Detlef Schrempf (27)	Shawn Kemp (13)	Kendall Gill (10)	Seattle Center Coliseum; 14,213	49–17
67	March 26	Minnesota	W 113–93	Detlef Schrempf (23)	Schrempf & Kemp (7)	Kendall Gill (9)	Seattle Center Coliseum; 14,651	50–17
68	March 28	Denver	W 111–97	Gary Payton (23)	Shawn Kemp (13)	Three-Way Tie (6)	Seattle Center Coliseum; 14,551	51–17
69	March 29	@ Portland	W 114–100	Shawn Kemp (28)	Shawn Kemp (12)	Gary Payton (9)	Memorial Coliseum; 12,888	52–17
70	March 31	L.A. Lakers	W 95–92	Shawn Kemp (28)	Shawn Kemp (12)	Gill & Payton (4)	Seattle Center Coliseum; 14,813	53–17

April : 10–2 (home: 7–0; road: 3–2)

Game	Date	Team	Score	High points	High rebounds	High assists	Location Attendance	Record
71	April 2	Golden State	W 119–109	Shawn Kemp (32)	Shawn Kemp (12)	Gary Payton (10)	Seattle Center Coliseum; 14,812	54–17
72	April 5	Utah	W 86–79	Detlef Schrempf (17)	Kemp & Perkins (8)	Payton & McMillan (4)	Seattle Center Coliseum; 14,813	55–17
73	April 7	@ Denver	L 90–104	Shawn Kemp (20)	Shawn Kemp (12)	Gill & McMillan (4)	McNichols Sports Arena; 17,171	55–18
74	April 8	Dallas	W 111–93	Gary Payton (22)	Shawn Kemp (13)	Gary Payton (7)	Seattle Center Coliseum; 14,551	56–18
75	April 10	Phoenix	W 111–108	Kendall Gill (29)	Shawn Kemp (15)	Kendall Gill (6)	Seattle Center Coliseum; 14,813	57–18
76	April 12	@ L.A. Clippers	W 116–101	Kendall Gill (26)	Shawn Kemp (14)	Detlef Schrempf (8)	Los Angeles Sports Arena; 11,160	58–18
77	April 14	L.A. Clippers	W 150–101	Detlef Schrempf (21)	Shawn Kemp (12)	Gary Payton (12)	Seattle Center Coliseum; 14,604	59–18
78	April 16	Houston	W 100–97	Shawn Kemp (22)	Shawn Kemp (17)	Gary Payton (7)	Seattle Center Coliseum; 14,813	60–18
79	April 19	@ Phoenix	L 116–122	Shawn Kemp (20)	Shawn Kemp (11)	Gary Payton (7)	America West Arena; 19,023	60–19
80	April 20	@ L.A. Lakers	W 112–90	Shawn Kemp (23)	Kemp & Perkins (11)	Nate McMillan (9)	Great Western Forum; 15,283	61–19
81	April 22	San Antonio	W 94–87	Ricky Pierce (26)	Nate McMillan (9)	McMillan & Schrempf (5)	Seattle Center Coliseum; 14,813	62–19
82	April 24	@ Portland	W 110–108	Schrempf & Payton (18)	Shawn Kemp (14)	Three-Way Tie (4)	Memorial Coliseum; 12,888	63–19

1993–94 schedule

== Playoffs ==
=== Game log ===
1994 playoff game log
First round: 2–3 (home: 2–1; road: 0–2)

Game	Date	Team	Score	High points	High rebounds	High assists	Location Attendance	Record
1	April 28	Denver	W 106–82	Detlef Schrempf (21)	Kemp, Perkins (9)	Gary Payton (7)	Seattle Center Coliseum; 14,813	1–0
2	April 30	Denver	W 97–87	Gary Payton (18)	Shawn Kemp (12)	Shawn Kemp (6)	Seattle Center Coliseum; 14,813	2–0
3	May 2	@ Denver	L 93–110	Detlef Schrempf (18)	Detlef Schrempf (6)	Gary Payton (5)	McNichols Sports Arena; 17,171	2–1
4	May 5	@ Denver	L 85–94 (OT)	Payton, Schrempf (20)	Shawn Kemp (13)	Vincent Askew (5)	McNichols Sports Arena; 17,171	2–2
5	May 7	Denver	L 94–98 (OT)	Kendall Gill (22)	Shawn Kemp (12)	Gary Payton (8)	Seattle Center Coliseum; 14,813	2–3

1994 schedule

== Player statistics ==
Legend
GP	Games played	GS	Games started	MPG	Minutes per game
FG%	Field-goal percentage	3P%	3-point field-goal percentage	FT%	Free-throw percentage
RPG	Rebounds per game	APG	Assists per game	SPG	Steals per game
BPG	Blocks per game	PPG	Points per game

=== Season ===
Player	GP	GS	MPG	FG%	3P%	FT%	RPG	APG	SPG	BPG	PPG
Vincent Askew	80	3	21.1	.481	.194	.829	2.3	2.4	.9	.2	9.1
Michael Cage	82	42	20.8	.545	.000	.486	5.4	.5	.9	.5	4.6
Alphonso Ford^{1}	6	0	2.7	.538	1.000	.500	.0	.2	.3	.0	2.7
Kendall Gill	79	77	30.8	.443	.317	.782	3.4	3.5	1.9	.4	14.1
Ervin Johnson	45	3	6.2	.415	.000	.630	2.6	.2	.2	.5	2.6
Shawn Kemp	79	73	32.9	.538	.250	.741	10.8	2.6	1.8	2.1	18.1
Chris King	15	0	5.7	.396	.286	.577	1.0	.7	.3	.0	3.7
Rich King	27	0	2.9	.441	.000	.500	.7	.3	.0	.1	1.5
Nate McMillan	73	8	25.8	.447	.391	.564	3.9	5.3	3.0	.3	6.0
Gary Payton	82	82	35.1	.504	.278	.595	3.3	6.0	2.3	.2	16.5
Sam Perkins	81	41	26.8	.438	.367	.801	4.5	1.4	.8	.4	12.3
Ricky Pierce	51	0	20.0	.471	.188	.896	1.6	1.8	.8	.1	14.5
Steve Scheffler	35	1	4.3	.609	.000	.950	.7	.2	.2	.0	2.1
Detlef Schrempf	81	80	33.7	.493	.324	.769	5.6	3.4	.9	.1	15.0

1. Statistics with the SuperSonics.

=== Playoffs ===
Player	GP	GS	MPG	FG%	3P%	FT%	RPG	APG	SPG	BPG	PPG
Vincent Askew	5	0	19.0	.357	.000	.842	1.2	1.8	.2	.0	7.2
Michael Cage	5	5	18.6	.375	.000	.333	5.4	.8	.8	1.0	2.8
Kendall Gill	5	5	30.6	.433	.222	.619	4.8	2.0	1.2	.2	13.4
Ervin Johnson	2	0	4.0	.000	.000	.000	2.0	.0	.0	.0	.0
Shawn Kemp	5	5	41.2	.371	.000	.667	9.8	3.4	2.0	2.4	14.8
Chris King	2	0	3.5	.000	.000	.000	5.2	3.7	.2	.0	.0
Nate McMillan	5	0	21.8	.320	.364	.250	3.2	2.0	1.2	.2	4.2
Gary Payton	5	5	36.2	.493	.333	.421	3.4	5.6	1.6	.4	15.8
Sam Perkins	5	0	28.2	.333	.429	.882	7.2	.8	.8	.4	9.8
Ricky Pierce	5	0	14.8	.452	.000	.706	1.0	.6	.2	.0	8.0
Steve Scheffler	1	0	9.0	1.000	.000	.000	3.0	.0	1.0	.0	2.0
Detlef Schrempf	5	5	34.8	.520	.333	.867	5.4	2.0	.2	.6	18.6

Player statistics citation:

== Awards and records ==
=== Awards ===
- Shawn Kemp earned an All-NBA Second Team selection.
- Gary Payton earned All-NBA Third Team and NBA All-Defensive First Team selections.
- Nate McMillan earned an All-Defensive Second Team selection and finished the season as leader in total steals and steals per game.
- Shawn Kemp and Gary Payton were both selected to play in the 1994 NBA All-Star Game for the West. It was Kemp's first start as an All-Star, and Payton's first appearance in an All-Star Game.

=== Records ===
- Team record for most victories in a single season (63)

== Transactions ==
=== Overview ===
Players Added ----

Via draft

- Ervin Johnson
- Chris King (from 1992 NBA draft)

Via free agency

- Alphonso Ford

Via trade

- Kendall Gill
- Detlef Schrempf
Players Lost ----

Via trade

- Dana Barros
- Eddie Johnson
- Derrick McKey
- Gerald Paddio

=== Trades ===
September 1, 1993	To Seattle SuperSonics Kendall Gill	To Charlotte Hornets Dana Barros Eddie Johnson Hornets option to swap 1994 first round picks with the SuperSonics.
November 1, 1993	To Seattle SuperSonics Detlef Schrempf	To Indiana Pacers Derrick McKey Gerald Paddio

=== Free agents ===
==== Additions ====
Player	Signed	Former team
Alphonso Ford^{2}	March 22, 1994	

1. First of two 10-day contracts.

Player Transactions Citation:

== See also ==
- 1993–94 NBA season
