= 1993–94 Utah Jazz season =

NBA professional basketball team season

- Head coach: Jerry Sloan
- General manager: Tim Howells
- Owner: Larry H. Miller
- Arena: Delta Center

Results
- Record: 53–29 (.646)
- Place: Division: 3rd (Midwest); Conference: 5th (Western)
- Playoff finish: Western Conference finals (lost to Rockets 1–4)
- Stats at Basketball Reference

Local media
- Television: KJZZ-TV; Prime Sports Intermountain West
- Radio: KCNR

The 1993–94 Utah Jazz season was the 20th season for the Utah Jazz in the National Basketball Association, and their 15th season in Salt Lake City, Utah.

== Season summary ==
=== Off-season ===
During the off-season, the Jazz signed free agent All-Star forward, and former University of Utah star Tom Chambers, and acquired Felton Spencer from the Minnesota Timberwolves.

=== Regular season ===
With the addition of Spencer and Chambers, the Jazz played competitive basketball with a 22–8 start to the regular season, but then lost five of their next six games, and later on held a 31–18 record at the All-Star break. At mid-season, the team traded Jeff Malone to the Philadelphia 76ers in exchange for All-Star guard Jeff Hornacek. With the addition of Hornacek, the Jazz posted a 10-game winning streak between February and March, and won eight of their final nine games of the season. The Jazz finished in third place in the Midwest Division with a 53–29 record, and earned the fifth seed in the Western Conference; the team qualified for the NBA playoffs for the eleventh consecutive year.

Karl Malone averaged 25.2 points, 11.5 rebounds, 4.0 assists, 1.5 steals and 1.5 blocks per game, and joined the list in all-time points scored topping the 19,000 point mark, while John Stockton averaged 15.1 points, 12.6 assists and 2.4 steals per game, as both players were named to the All-NBA First Team. In addition, Hornacek provided the team with 14.6 points and 3.9 assists per game in 27 games after the trade, while Chambers played a sixth man role off the bench, averaging 11.2 points and 4.1 rebounds per game, and Spencer provided with 8.6 points and 8.3 rebounds per game. Meanwhile, Tyrone Corbin contributed 8.0 points and 1.2 steals per game, Jay Humphries contributed 7.5 points per game, David Benoit provided with 6.5 points and 4.7 rebounds per game, and rookie small forward, and second-round draft pick Bryon Russell averaged 5.0 points per game.

During the NBA All-Star weekend at the Target Center in Minneapolis, Minnesota, Malone and Stockton were both selected for the 1994 NBA All-Star Game, as members of the Western Conference All-Star team, while Russell was selected for the inaugural NBA Rookie Game, as a member of the Phenoms team. Malone also finished tied in seventh place in Most Valuable Player voting, while Stockton finished tied in eleventh place.

The Jazz finished third in the NBA in home-game attendance, with an attendance of 814,502 at the Delta Center during the regular season.

=== NBA playoffs ===
In the Western Conference First Round of the 1994 NBA playoffs, the Jazz faced off against the 4th–seeded San Antonio Spurs, who were led by the trio of All-Star center David Robinson, Dale Ellis, and rebound-specialist Dennis Rodman. The Jazz lost Game 1 to the Spurs on the road, 106–89 at the Alamodome, but managed to win the next three games, which included a Game 4 win over the Spurs at home, 95–90 at the Delta Center to win the series in four games.

In the Western Conference Semi-finals, the team faced off against the 8th–seeded Denver Nuggets, a team that featured defensive shot-blocker Dikembe Mutombo, Mahmoud Abdul-Rauf, and second-year star LaPhonso Ellis. The Jazz won the first three games over the Nuggets, which included a Game 3 road win at the McNichols Sports Arena in overtime, 111–109 to take a 3–0 series lead. However, the team lost the next three games, including a Game 6 loss to the Nuggets at the McNichols Sports Arena, 94–91. With the series tied at 3–3, the Jazz won Game 7 over the Nuggets at the Delta Center, 91–81, thus winning in a hard-fought seven-game series.

In the Western Conference Finals, the Jazz then faced off against the 2nd–seeded, and Midwest Division champion Houston Rockets, a team that featured All-Star center, Most Valuable Player and Defensive Player of the Year, Hakeem Olajuwon, Otis Thorpe and Vernon Maxwell. The Jazz lost the first two games to the Rockets on the road at The Summit, before winning Game 3 at the Delta Center, 95–86. The Jazz lost the next two games to the Rockets, including a Game 5 loss at The Summit, 94–83, thus losing the series in five games.

The Rockets would go on to defeat the New York Knicks in a full seven-game series in the 1994 NBA Finals, winning their first ever NBA championship in franchise history.

=== Aftermath ===
Following the season, Corbin was traded to the Atlanta Hawks, and Mark Eaton retired after missing the entire regular season due to a back injury.

== Draft picks ==
Round	Pick	Player	Position	Nationality	College
1	18	Luther Wright	C	United States	Seton Hall
2	45	Bryon Russell	SF	United States	California State-Long Beach

== Roster ==
1993–94 Utah Jazz roster
Players

Pos.	No.	Player	Height	Weight	DOB	From
SF	21	David Benoit	6 ft 8 in (2.03 m)	220 lb (100 kg)	1968–05–09	Alabama
SG	20	Walter Bond	6 ft 5 in (1.96 m)	200 lb (91 kg)	1969–02–01	Minnesota
PF	42	Tom Chambers	6 ft 10 in (2.08 m)	220 lb (100 kg)	1959–06–21	Utah
SF	23	Tyrone Corbin	6 ft 6 in (1.98 m)	210 lb (95 kg)	1962–12–31	DePaul
PG	25	John Crotty	6 ft 1 in (1.85 m)	185 lb (84 kg)	1969–07–15	Virginia
C	53	Mark Eaton (IN)	7 ft 4 in (2.24 m)	275 lb (125 kg)	1957–01–24	UCLA
C	55	Chad Gallagher	6 ft 10 in (2.08 m)	255 lb (116 kg)	1969–05–30	Creighton
SG	30	Sean Green	6 ft 5 in (1.96 m)	210 lb (95 kg)	1970–02–02	Iona
SG	14	Jeff Hornacek	6 ft 3 in (1.91 m)	190 lb (86 kg)	1963–05–03	Iowa State
SF	43	Stephen Howard	6 ft 9 in (2.06 m)	225 lb (102 kg)	1970–07–15	DePaul
SG	6	Jay Humphries	6 ft 3 in (1.91 m)	185 lb (84 kg)	1962–10–17	Colorado
SG	22	Dave Jamerson	6 ft 5 in (1.96 m)	190 lb (86 kg)	1967–08–13	Ohio
SG	24	Jeff Malone	6 ft 4 in (1.93 m)	205 lb (93 kg)	1961–06–28	Mississippi State
PF	32	Karl Malone	6 ft 9 in (2.06 m)	250 lb (113 kg)	1963–07–24	Louisiana Tech
C	55	Darren Morningstar	6 ft 10 in (2.08 m)	235 lb (107 kg)	1969–04–22	Pittsburgh
SF	34	Bryon Russell	6 ft 7 in (2.01 m)	225 lb (102 kg)	1970–12–31	Long Beach State
C	50	Felton Spencer	7 ft 0 in (2.13 m)	265 lb (120 kg)	1968–01–15	Louisville
PG	12	John Stockton	6 ft 1 in (1.85 m)	170 lb (77 kg)	1962–03–26	Gonzaga
PF	33	Aaron Williams	6 ft 9 in (2.06 m)	220 lb (100 kg)	1971–10–02	Xavier
C	44	Luther Wright	7 ft 2 in (2.18 m)	270 lb (122 kg)	1971–09–22	Seton Hall

Coaches
Head coach
- Jerry Sloan
Assistant(s)
- Gordon Chiesa
- David Fredman
- Phil Johnson

Legend
- (DP) Unsigned draft pick
- (FA) Free agent
- (S) Suspended
- (IN) Inactive
- Injured

Roster
Updated: March 28, 1994

=== Roster Notes ===
- Center Mark Eaton was on the injured reserve list due to a back injury, and missed the entire regular season.
- Rookie center Luther Wright was placed on the injured reverse list for treatment of attention deficit disorder; Wright only played just 15 games during the regular season.

== Regular season ==
=== Season standings ===
Midwest Division	W	L	PCT	GB	Home	Road	Div
y-Houston Rockets	58	24	.707	—	35–6	23–18	15–11
x-San Antonio Spurs	55	27	.671	3	32–9	23–18	16–10
x-Utah Jazz	53	29	.646	5	33–8	20–21	21–5
x-Denver Nuggets	42	40	.512	16	28–13	14–27	14–12
Minnesota Timberwolves	20	62	.244	38	13–28	7–34	5–21
Dallas Mavericks	13	69	.159	45	6–35	7–34	7–19

#	Western Conference				
#	Team	W	L	PCT	GB
1	z-Seattle SuperSonics	63	19	.768	–
2	y-Houston Rockets	58	24	.707	5
3	x-Phoenix Suns	56	26	.683	7
4	x-San Antonio Spurs	55	27	.671	8
5	x-Utah Jazz	53	29	.646	10
6	x-Golden State Warriors	50	32	.610	13
7	x-Portland Trail Blazers	47	35	.573	16
8	x-Denver Nuggets	42	40	.512	21
9	Los Angeles Lakers	33	49	.402	30
10	Sacramento Kings	28	54	.341	35
11	Los Angeles Clippers	27	55	.329	36
12	Minnesota Timberwolves	20	62	.244	43
13	Dallas Mavericks	13	69	.159	50

z – clinched division title
y – clinched division title
x – clinched playoff spot

== Game log ==
=== Regular season ===
1993–94 game log
Total: 53–29 (home: 33–8; road: 20–21)
November: 9–5 (home: 5–2; road: 4–3)

Game	Date	Team	Score	High points	High rebounds	High assists	Location Attendance	Record
1	November 5	Dallas	W 102–86				Delta Center	1–0
2	November 6	@ Minnesota	W 105–95				Target Center	2–0
3	November 8	Seattle	L 100–101				Delta Center	2–1
4	November 10; 7:00 p.m. MST	Atlanta	W 91–88	K Malone (26)	K Malone (20)	Stockton (11)	Delta Center; 19,911	3–1
5	November 12	Detroit	W 109–89				Delta Center	4–1
6	November 13	@ Dallas	W 101–100				Reunion Arena	5–1
7	November 16	@ Orlando	L 96–114				Orlando Arena	5–2
8	November 17; 5:30 p.m. MST	@ Miami	W 115–111	K Malone (30)	K Malone (10)	Stockton (17)	Miami Arena; 14,879	6–2
9	November 19	@ Philadelphia	L 115–124				The Spectrum	6–3
10	November 20; 6:30 p.m. MST	@ New York	W 86–72	K Malone (20)	K Malone, Spencer (12)	Stockton (8)	Madison Square Garden; 19,763	7–3
11	November 24; 7:00 p.m. MST	Houston	L 93–95 (OT)	Stockton (24)	K Malone (18)	Stockton (10)	Delta Center; 19,911	7–4
12	November 26	New Jersey	W 100–97				Delta Center	8–4
13	November 27; 7:00 p.m. MST	@ Phoenix	L 98–120	Humphries (17)	Spencer (9)	Stockton (9)	America West Arena; 19,023	8–5
14	November 30; 7:00 p.m. MST	Denver	W 103–92	K Malone (28)	K Malone (11)	Stockton (9)	Delta Center; 18,546	9–5

December: 11–3 (home: 7–0; road: 4–3)

Game	Date	Team	Score	High points	High rebounds	High assists	Location Attendance	Record
15	December 2; 7:00 p.m. MST	Indiana	W 103–87	J Malone (27)	K Malone (18)	Stockton (13)	Delta Center; 19,609	10–5
16	December 4	Charlotte	W 122–108				Delta Center	11–5
17	December 6; 7:00 p.m. MST	New York	W 103–96	K Malone (29)	K Malone (15)	Stockton (13)	Delta Center; 19,911	12–5
18	December 8	Washington	W 113–91				Delta Center	13–5
19	December 10; 7:00 p.m. MST	@ Denver	L 98–107	K Malone (27)	K Malone (14)	Stockton (8)	McNichols Sports Arena; 16,327	13–6
20	December 11	@ Golden State	L 112–115 (OT)				Oakland-Alameda County Coliseum Arena	13–7
21	December 13	San Antonio	W 102–87				Delta Center	14–7
22	December 15	@ Minnesota	W 97–95				Target Center	15–7
23	December 17	@ Boston	W 97–96				Boston Garden	16–7
24	December 18	@ Washington	W 102–96				USAir Arena	17–7
25	December 21	@ Cleveland	L 97–112				Richfield Coliseum	17–8
26	December 23	@ San Antonio	W 96–88				Alamodome	18–8
27	December 27	Minnesota	W 97–93				Delta Center	19–8
28	December 29	Boston	W 110–107 (OT)				Delta Center	20–8

January: 8–7 (home: 5–2; road: 3–5)

Game	Date	Team	Score	High points	High rebounds	High assists	Location Attendance	Record
29	January 2	@ Portland	W 92–90				Memorial Coliseum	21–8
30	January 3	Dallas	W 115–85				Delta Center	22–8
31	January 5; 7:00 p.m. MST	Phoenix	L 91–107	Stockton (17)	Spencer (10)	Stockton (14)	Delta Center; 19,911	22–9
32	January 7; 7:00 p.m. MST	Miami	L 104–110	Stockton (22)	K Malone (17)	Stockton (13)	Delta Center; 19,911	22–10
33	January 8	@ Seattle	L 87–108				Seattle Center Coliseum	22–11
34	January 13	@ Milwaukee	W 101–83				Bradley Center	23–11
35	January 14; 6:30 p.m. MST	@ Chicago	L 91–107	K Malone (26)	K Malone (10)	Stockton (16)	Chicago Stadium; 18,676	23–12
36	January 16	@ New Jersey	L 94–99				Brendan Byrne Arena	23–13
37	January 17	@ Detroit	W 109–94				The Palace of Auburn Hills	24–13
38	January 19	Cleveland	W 104–92				Delta Center	25–13
39	January 21	Sacramento	W 112–83				Delta Center	26–13
40	January 22; 6:30 p.m. MST	@ Houston	L 101–106	K Malone (27)	Spencer (10)	Stockton (17)	The Summit; 16,611	26–14
41	January 24	Seattle	W 95–90				Delta Center	27–14
42	January 26	@ Minnesota	L 98–100				Target Center	27–15
43	January 28	Golden State	W 119–91				Delta Center	28–15

February: 10–4 (home: 7–2; road: 3–2)

Game	Date	Team	Score	High points	High rebounds	High assists	Location Attendance	Record
44	February 1; 7:00 p.m. MST	Houston	W 104–88	K Malone (29)	K Malone, Spencer (12)	Stockton (13)	Delta Center; 19,911	29–15
45	February 3; 7:00 p.m. MST	Chicago	L 85–94	K Malone (24)	K Malone (10)	Stockton (12)	Delta Center; 19,911	29–16
46	February 5	Portland	W 128–114				Delta Center	30–16
47	February 6	@ L.A. Lakers	L 90–107				Great Western Forum	30–17
48	February 8; 7:00 p.m. MST	@ Denver	W 96–95	K Malone (24)	Spencer (11)	Stockton (12)	McNichols Sports Arena; 14,897	31–17
49	February 9	L.A. Lakers	L 96–103				Delta Center	31–18
All-Star Break
50	February 16	@ L.A. Clippers	W 103–99				Los Angeles Memorial Sports Arena	32–18
51	February 18	@ Sacramento	L 81–90				ARCO Arena	32–19
52	February 19	L.A. Clippers	W 100–93				Delta Center	33–19
53	February 21	Philadelphia	W 119–92				Delta Center	34–19
54	February 23	San Antonio	W 106–102 (2OT)				Delta Center	35–19
55	February 25; 7:00 p.m. MST	Phoenix	W 107–87	Humphries (23)	Spencer (16)	Stockton (13)	Delta Center; 19,911	36–19
56	February 26; 6:30 p.m. MST	@ Houston	W 95–85	K Malone (28)	K Malone (12)	Stockton (10)	The Summit; 16,611	37–19
57	February 28; 7:00 p.m. MST	Houston	W 89–85	K Malone (18)	Corbon (9)	Stockton (7)	Delta Center; 19,911	38–19

March: 6–8 (home: 3–2; road: 3–6)

Game	Date	Team	Score	High points	High rebounds	High assists	Location Attendance	Record
58	March 2	@ San Antonio	W 106–96				Alamodome	39–19
59	March 5	@ Dallas	W 103–90				Reunion Arena	40–19
60	March 6; 7:00 p.m. MST	@ Phoenix	W 103–92	K Malone (30)	Corbin (10)	Stockton (20)	America West Arena; 19,023	41–19
61	March 8	Minnesota	W 100–86				Delta Center	42–19
62	March 9	@ Portland	L 99–122				Memorial Coliseum	42–20
63	March 14	L.A. Lakers	W 102–101				Delta Center	43–20
64	March 15	@ L.A. Clippers	L 105–108				Los Angeles Memorial Sports Arena	43–21
65	March 18	@ Charlotte	L 78–82				Charlotte Coliseum	43–22
66	March 19; 5:30 p.m. MST	@ Indiana	L 103–107	K Malone (37)	K Malone (8)	Stockton (11)	Market Square Arena; 15,374	43–23
67	March 21; 5:30 p.m. MST	@ Atlanta	L 96–100 (OT)	Stockton (21)	Benoit (17)	Stockton (11)	The Omni; 12,882	43–24
68	March 23	Orlando	L 93–98				Delta Center	43–25
69	March 25	Milwaukee	W 103–96				Delta Center	44–25
70	March 26; 6:30 p.m. MST	@ Houston	L 83–98	K Malone (23)	Spencer(12)	Stockton (9)	The Summit; 16,611	44–26
71	March 29	Golden State	L 113–116				Delta Center	44–27

April: 9–2 (home: 6–0; road: 3–2)

Game	Date	Team	Score	High points	High rebounds	High assists	Location Attendance	Record
72	April 2; 7:00 p.m. MST	Denver	W 101–91	K Malone (31)	K Malone (12)	Stockton (9)	Delta Center; 19,911	45–27
73	April 5	@ Seattle	L 79–86				Seattle Center Coliseum	45–28
74	April 7	Dallas	W 99–82				Delta Center	46–28
75	April 9	L.A. Clippers	W 128–104				Delta Center	47–28
76	April 12	Sacramento	W 126–91				Delta Center	48–28
77	April 14	San Antonio	W 101–90				Delta Center	49–28
78	April 16	@ Golden State	L 105–109				Oakland-Alameda County Coliseum Arena	49–29
79	April 19	@ Sacramento	W 115–108				ARCO Arena	50–29
80	April 21	Portland	W 122–111				Delta Center	51–29
81	April 22; 7:00 p.m. MDT	@ Denver	W 113–106	K Malone (38)	K Malone (12)	Stockton (7)	McNichols Sports Arena; 17,171	52–29
82	April 24	@ L.A. Lakers	W 103–97				Great Western Forum	53–29

1993–94 schedule

== Playoffs ==
1994 playoff game log
Western Conference First Round: 3–1 (home: 2–0; road: 1–1)

Game	Date	Team	Score	High points	High rebounds	High assists	Location Attendance	Series
1	April 28; 7:30 p.m. MDT	@ San Antonio	L 89–106	K Malone (36)	K Malone (10)	Stockton (8)	Alamodome; 18,257	0–1
2	April 30; 11:00 a.m. MDT	@ San Antonio	W 96–84	K Malone (23)	K Malone (14)	Stockton (5)	Alamodome; 20,640	1–1
3	May 3; 8:30 p.m. MDT	San Antonio	W 105–72	K Malone (24)	K Malone (13)	Stockton (12)	Delta Center; 19,911	2–1
4	May 5; 8:30 p.m. MDT	San Antonio	W 95–90	K Malone (34)	K Malone (12)	Stockton (18)	Delta Center; 19,911	3–1

Western Conference Semifinals: 4–3 (home: 3–1; road: 1–2)

Game	Date	Team	Score	High points	High rebounds	High assists	Location Attendance	Series
1	May 10; 8:30 p.m. MDT	Denver	W 100–91	K Malone (25)	K Malone (10)	Stockton (11)	Delta Center; 19,911	1–0
2	May 12; 8:30 p.m. MDT	Denver	W 104–94	K Malone (32)	K Malone (12)	Stockton (8)	Delta Center; 19,911	2–0
3	May 14; 1:30 p.m. MDT	@ Denver	W 111–109 (OT)	Hornacek (27)	K Malone (13)	Stockton (13)	McNichols Sports Arena; 17,171	3–0
4	May 15; 7:00 p.m. MDT	@ Denver	L 82–83	K Malone (20)	K Malone (9)	Stockton (6)	McNichols Sports Arena; 17,171	3–1
5	May 17; 7:00 p.m. MDT	Denver	L 101–109 (2OT)	K Malone (22)	Corbin, Spencer (14)	Stockton (13)	Delta Center; 19,911	3–2
6	May 19; 7:00 p.m. MDT	@ Denver	L 91–94	K Malone (31)	K Malone (15)	Stockton (7)	McNichols Sports Arena; 17,171	3–3
7	May 21; 1:30 p.m. MDT	Denver	W 91–81	K Malone (31)	K Malone (14)	Stockton (9)	Delta Center; 19,911	4–3

Western Conference Finals: 1–4 (home: 1–1; road: 0–3)

Game	Date	Team	Score	High points	High rebounds	High assists	Location Attendance	Series
1	May 23; 7:00 p.m. MDT	@ Houston	L 86–100	K Malone (20)	K Malone (16)	Stockton (11)	The Summit; 16,611	0–1
2	May 25; 7:00 p.m. MDT	@ Houston	L 99–104	K Malone (32)	K Malone, Spencer (7)	Stockton (10)	The Summit; 16,611	0–2
3	May 27; 7:00 p.m. MDT	Houston	W 95–86	K Malone (22)	K Malone (16)	Stockton (11)	Delta Center; 19,911	1–2
4	May 29; 1:30 p.m. MDT	Houston	L 78–80	K Malone (25)	K Malone (14)	Stockton (6)	Delta Center; 19,911	1–3
5	May 31; 7:00 p.m. MDT	@ Houston	L 83–94	K Malone (31)	Spencer (15)	Stockton (9)	The Summit; 16,611	1–4

1994 schedule

== Player statistics ==
Legend
GP	Games played	GS	Games started	MPG	Minutes per game
FG%	Field-goal percentage	3P%	3-point field-goal percentage	FT%	Free-throw percentage
RPG	Rebounds per game	APG	Assists per game	SPG	Steals per game
BPG	Blocks per game	PPG	Points per game

=== Season ===
Player	GP	GS	MPG	FG%	3FG%	FT%	RPG	APG	SPG	BPG	PPG
Karl Malone	82	82	40.6	.497	.250	.694	11.5	4.0	1.5	1.5	25.2
Jeff Malone	50	50	33.1	.488	.500	.843	2.3	1.3	0.5	0.1	16.2
John Stockton	82	82	36.2	.528	.322	.805	3.1	12.6	2.4	0.3	15.1
Jeff Hornacek	27	9	30.6	.509	.429	.891	2.5	3.9	1.2	0.1	14.6
Tom Chambers	80	0	23.0	.440	.311	.786	4.1	1.0	0.5	0.4	11.2
Felton Spencer	79	79	28.0	.505		.607	8.3	0.5	0.5	0.8	8.6
Tyrone Corbin	82	17	26.2	.456	.207	.813	4.7	1.5	1.2	0.3	8.0
Jay Humphries	75	19	21.6	.436	.396	.750	1.7	2.9	0.9	0.1	7.5
David Benoit	55	18	19.5	.385	.203	.773	4.7	0.4	0.4	0.7	6.5
Bryon Russell	67	48	16.7	.484	.091	.614	2.7	0.8	1.0	0.3	5.0
Stephen Howard	9	0	5.9	.588		.688	1.8	0.1	0.1	0.3	3.4
Walter Bond	56	4	10.0	.404	.352	.775	1.1	0.6	0.3	0.2	3.1
Chad Gallagher	2	0	1.5	1.000			0.0	0.0	0.0	0.0	3.0
John Crotty	45	0	7.0	.455	.458	.861	0.7	1.7	0.3	0.0	2.9
Darren Morningstar	1	0	4.0	1.000			1.0	0.0	0.0	0.0	2.0
Luther Wright	15	2	6.1	.348	.000	.750	0.7	0.0	0.1	0.1	1.3
Dave Jamerson	1	0	4.0	.000		1.000	1.0	0.0	0.0	0.0	1.0
Aaron Williams	6	0	2.0	.250		.000	0.5	0.2	0.0	0.0	0.7
Sean Green	1	0	2.0	.000			0.0	0.0	0.0	0.0	0.0

=== Playoffs ===
Player	GP	GS	MPG	FG%	3FG%	FT%	RPG	APG	SPG	BPG	PPG
Karl Malone	16	16	43.9	.467	.000	.738	12.4	3.4	1.4	0.8	27.1
Jeff Hornacek	16	16	34.9	.475	.441	.912	2.4	4.0	1.5	0.4	15.4
John Stockton	16	16	37.3	.456	.167	.810	3.3	9.8	1.7	0.5	14.4
Felton Spencer	16	16	30.8	.448		.660	8.4	0.4	0.2	1.3	7.9
Jay Humphries	16	0	22.3	.426	.318	.679	2.3	2.4	0.8	0.1	7.4
David Benoit	16	5	22.3	.393	.188	.640	4.2	0.6	0.4	0.7	7.2
Tyrone Corbin	16	11	25.8	.387	.333	.933	4.9	0.9	1.3	0.2	6.3
Tom Chambers	16	0	20.3	.361	.000	.793	2.8	0.8	0.3	0.6	5.8
Bryon Russell	6	0	6.0	.400	.667	1.000	1.5	0.5	0.0	0.0	2.7
John Crotty	8	0	4.8	.364	1.000	1.000	0.4	1.1	0.1	0.0	1.5
Stephen Howard	10	0	2.7	.273		.727	1.0	0.0	0.0	0.0	1.4
Walter Bond	4	0	3.3	.000	.000	.500	0.3	0.0	0.3	0.0	0.3

Player statistics citation:

== Awards and records ==
=== Awards ===
- Karl Malone, All-NBA First Team
- John Stockton, All-NBA First Team

== Transactions ==
=== Free agents ===
==== Additions ====
Player	Signed	Former team

==== Subtractions ====
Player	Left	New team

== See also ==
- 1993–94 NBA season
