= 1993–94 Phoenix Suns season =

NBA team season

- Head coach: Paul Westphal
- General manager: Jerry Colangelo
- Owner: Jerry Colangelo
- Arena: America West Arena

Results
- Record: 56–26 (.683)
- Place: Division: 2nd (Pacific); Conference: 3rd (Western)
- Playoff finish: Conference semifinals (lost to Rockets 3–4)
- Stats at Basketball Reference

Local media
- Television: KUTP; ASPN
- Radio: KTAR

The 1993–94 Phoenix Suns season was the 26th season for the Phoenix Suns in the National Basketball Association.

== Season summary ==
=== Off-season ===
During the off-season, the Suns signed free agents; A.C. Green, who won two NBA championships with the Los Angeles Lakers in the 1980s, and also signed Joe Kleine.

=== Regular season ===
With the addition of Green, the Suns got off to a 15–3 start to the regular season after a seven-game winning streak in December, and later on held a 31–15 record at the All-Star break. At mid-season, the team signed free agent and second-year guard Elliot Perry. The Suns won their final seven games of the season, and finished in second place in the Pacific Division with a 56–26 record, earning the third seed in the Western Conference; the team qualified for the NBA playoffs for the sixth consecutive year.

Reigning MVP Charles Barkley averaged 21.6 points, 11.2 rebounds, 4.6 assists and 1.6 steals per game in 65 games, missing 17 due to a quadriceps tendon injury, while Kevin Johnson averaged 20.0 points, 9.5 assists and 1.9 steals per game. In addition, Cedric Ceballos showed improvement, averaging 19.1 points and 6.5 rebounds per game, but only appeared in 53 games due to a preseason foot injury, while three-point specialist Dan Majerle contributed 16.5 points and 1.6 steals per game, and led the league with 192 three-point field goals, and Green provided the team with 14.7 points and 9.2 rebounds per game. Meanwhile, second-year center Oliver Miller provided with 9.2 points, 6.9 rebounds, 3.5 assists and 1.8 blocks per game, Danny Ainge contributed 8.9 points per game off the bench, Mark West averaged 4.7 points and 3.6 rebounds per game, and Perry contributed 3.9 points and 4.6 assists per game in 27 games.

During the NBA All-Star weekend at the Target Center in Minneapolis, Minnesota, Barkley and Johnson were both selected for the 1994 NBA All-Star Game, as members of the Western Conference All-Star team, although Barkley did not participate due to injury; it was the eighth All-Star selection for Barkley, and the third and final All-Star appearance for Johnson. Both players were also named to the All-NBA Second Team at the end of the season, while Barkley finished in tenth place in Most Valuable Player voting, and Johnson finished in eleventh place.

The Suns finished sixth in the NBA in home-game attendance, with an attendance of 779,952 at the America West Arena during the regular season.

=== NBA playoffs ===
In the Western Conference First Round of the 1994 NBA playoffs, the Suns faced off against the 6th–seeded Golden State Warriors, a team that featured All-Star guard Latrell Sprewell, Rookie of the Year, Chris Webber, and All-Star forward Chris Mullin. The Suns won the first two games over the Warriors at home at the America West Arena, before winning Game 3 on the road, 140–133 at the Oakland-Alameda County Coliseum Arena, in which Barkley scored a playoff career-high of 56 points; the Suns won the series over the Warriors in a three-game sweep.

In the Western Conference Semi-finals, the team faced off against the 2nd–seeded, and Midwest Division champion Houston Rockets, a team that featured All-Star center, Most Valuable Player and Defensive Player of the Year, Hakeem Olajuwon, Otis Thorpe and Vernon Maxwell. The Suns managed to win their first two road games over the Rockets at The Summit; in Game 2, the Suns overcame a 20-point deficit to defeat the Rockets in overtime, 124–117, and took a 2–0 series lead. The Suns lost the next three games to the Rockets, but managed to win Game 6 at the America West Arena, 103–89 to even the series. However, the Suns lost Game 7 to the Rockets at The Summit, 104–94, thus losing in a hard-fought seven-game series.

The Rockets would go on to defeat the New York Knicks in a full seven-game series in the 1994 NBA Finals, winning their first ever NBA championship in franchise history.

=== Aftermath ===
Following the season, Ceballos was traded to the Los Angeles Lakers, and Miller signed as a free agent with the Detroit Pistons, while West was traded to the Pistons in exchange for a future draft pick.

== Offseason ==
=== NBA draft ===
Round	Pick	Player	Position	Nationality	College
1	27	Malcolm Mackey	Forward	United States	Georgia Tech
2	49	Mark Buford	Center	United States	Mississippi Valley State
2	54	Byron Wilson	Guard	United States	Utah

== Roster ==
1993–94 Phoenix Suns roster
Players

Pos.	No.	Player	Height	Weight	DOB	From
G	22	Danny Ainge	6 ft 4 in (1.93 m)	175 lb (79 kg)	1959–03–17	BYU
F	34	Charles Barkley	6 ft 6 in (1.98 m)	263 lb (119 kg)	1963–02–20	Auburn
F	23	Cedric Ceballos	6 ft 6 in (1.98 m)	190 lb (86 kg)	1969–08–02	Cal State Fullerton
G	11	Duane Cooper	6 ft 1 in (1.85 m)	185 lb (84 kg)	1969–06–25	USC
F	21	Richard Dumas (S)	6 ft 7 in (2.01 m)	200 lb (91 kg)	1969–05–19	Oklahoma State
F	45	A.C. Green	6 ft 9 in (2.06 m)	220 lb (100 kg)	1963–10–04	Oregon State
G	4	Herman Henry	6 ft 7 in (2.01 m)	190 lb (86 kg)	1967–12–08	Oklahoma
G	3	Frank Johnson	6 ft 1 in (1.85 m)	185 lb (84 kg)	1958–11–23	Wake Forest
G	7	Kevin Johnson	6 ft 1 in (1.85 m)	180 lb (82 kg)	1966–03–04	California
C	35	Joe Kleine	6 ft 11 in (2.11 m)	255 lb (116 kg)	1962–01–04	Arkansas
C	27	Malcolm Mackey	6 ft 9 in (2.06 m)	248 lb (112 kg)	1970–07–11	Georgia Tech
G	9	Dan Majerle	6 ft 6 in (1.98 m)	215 lb (98 kg)	1965–09–09	Central Michigan
C	25	Oliver Miller	6 ft 9 in (2.06 m)	280 lb (127 kg)	1970–04–06	Arkansas
F	0	Jerrod Mustaf	6 ft 10 in (2.08 m)	238 lb (108 kg)	1969–10–28	Maryland
G	2	Elliot Perry	6 ft 0 in (1.83 m)	150 lb (68 kg)	1969–03–28	Memphis
C	41	Mark West	6 ft 10 in (2.08 m)	230 lb (104 kg)	1960–11–05	Old Dominion

Coaches
Head coach
- Paul Westphal
Assistant(s)
- Lionel Hollins
- Scotty Robertson

Legend
- (DP) Unsigned draft pick
- (FA) Free agent
- (S) Suspended
- Injured

Roster
Updated: April 15, 1994

=== Roster Notes ===
- Small forward Richard Dumas was suspended indefinitely without pay by the NBA for refusing to cooperate in substance-abuse rehabilitation.

== Regular season ==
=== Standings ===
Pacific Division	W	L	PCT	GB	Home	Road	Div
y-Seattle SuperSonics	63	19	.768	—	37–4	26–15	25–5
x-Phoenix Suns	56	26	.683	7	36–5	20–21	19–11
x-Golden State Warriors	50	32	.610	13	29–12	21–20	19–11
x-Portland Trail Blazers	47	35	.573	16	30–11	17–24	17–13
Los Angeles Lakers	33	49	.402	30	21–20	12–29	7–23
Sacramento Kings	28	54	.341	35	20–21	8–33	9–21
Los Angeles Clippers	27	55	.329	36	17–24	10–31	9–21

#	Western Conference				
#	Team	W	L	PCT	GB
1	z-Seattle SuperSonics	63	19	.768	–
2	y-Houston Rockets	58	24	.707	5
3	x-Phoenix Suns	56	26	.683	7
4	x-San Antonio Spurs	55	27	.671	8
5	x-Utah Jazz	53	29	.646	10
6	x-Golden State Warriors	50	32	.610	13
7	x-Portland Trail Blazers	47	35	.573	16
8	x-Denver Nuggets	42	40	.512	21
9	Los Angeles Lakers	33	49	.402	30
10	Sacramento Kings	28	54	.341	35
11	Los Angeles Clippers	27	55	.329	36
12	Minnesota Timberwolves	20	62	.244	43
13	Dallas Mavericks	13	69	.159	50

== Game log ==
=== Regular season ===
1993–94 game log
Total: 56–26 (home: 36–5; road: 20–21)
November: 8–3 (home: 6–0; road: 2–3)

Game	Date	Team	Score	High points	High rebounds	High assists	Location Attendance	Record
1	November 5, 1993	@ L.A. Lakers	L 108–116				Great Western Forum	0–1
2	November 7, 1993	Sacramento	W 132–110				America West Arena	1–1
3	November 9, 1993	@ L.A. Clippers	W 114–99				Los Angeles Memorial Sports Arena	2–1
4	November 10, 1993	San Antonio	W 101–93				America West Arena	3–1
5	November 13, 1993	@ Houston	L 95–99				The Summit	3–2
6	November 16, 1993	@ Golden State	W 116–104				Oakland-Alameda County Coliseum Arena	4–2
7	November 19, 1993	Portland	W 118–109				America West Arena	5–2
8	November 20, 1993	Cleveland	W 112–96				America West Arena	6–2
9	November 24, 1993	Denver	W 130–97				America West Arena	7–2
10	November 27, 1993	Utah	W 120–98				America West Arena	8–2
11	November 30, 1993	@ Chicago	L 113–132				Chicago Stadium	8–3

December: 13–2 (home: 8–1; road: 5–1)

Game	Date	Team	Score	High points	High rebounds	High assists	Location Attendance	Record
12	December 2, 1993	@ Detroit	W 102–101				The Palace of Auburn Hills	9–3
13	December 3, 1993	@ New Jersey	W 104–103				Brendan Byrne Arena	10–3
14	December 5, 1993	@ Milwaukee	W 117–98				Bradley Center	11–3
15	December 9, 1993	Washington	W 114–95				America West Arena	12–3
16	December 11, 1993	@ Dallas	W 114–103				Reunion Arena	13–3
17	December 13, 1993	Milwaukee	W 112–104				America West Arena	14–3
18	December 15, 1993	Golden State	W 110–104				America West Arena	15–3
19	December 17, 1993	Orlando	L 101–104				America West Arena	15–4
20	December 18, 1993	L.A. Clippers	W 116–109				America West Arena	16–4
21	December 20, 1993	Indiana	W 102–94				America West Arena	17–4
22	December 21, 1993	@ Denver	L 95–121				McNichols Sports Arena	17–5
23	December 23, 1993	@ Seattle	W 87–86				Seattle Center Coliseum	18–5
24	December 25, 1993	Houston	W 111–91				America West Arena	19–5
25	December 27, 1993	Boston	W 118–102				America West Arena	20–5
26	December 30, 1993	Philadelphia	W 119–107				America West Arena	21–5

January: 7–8 (home: 3–2; road: 4–6)

Game	Date	Team	Score	High points	High rebounds	High assists	Location Attendance	Record
27	January 4, 1994	Seattle	L 106–112				America West Arena	21–6
28	January 5, 1994	@ Utah	W 107–91				Delta Center	22–6
29	January 7, 1994	@ Minnesota	W 110–103				Target Center	23–6
30	January 9, 1994	Golden State	W 122–107				America West Arena	24–6
31	January 11, 1994	Charlotte	L 93–95				America West Arena	24–7
32	January 13, 1994	@ San Antonio	L 88–107				Alamodome	24–8
33	January 15, 1994	@ Sacramento	W 119–103				ARCO Arena	25–8
34	January 17, 1994	@ Golden State	L 99–104				Oakland-Alameda County Coliseum Arena	25–9
35	January 18, 1994	Dallas	W 113–103				America West Arena	26–9
36	January 20, 1994	@ L.A. Lakers	L 102–107				Great Western Forum	26–10
37	January 22, 1994	Portland	W 118–117				America West Arena	27–10
38	January 25, 1994	@ New York	L 96–98				Madison Square Garden	27–11
39	January 26, 1994	@ Atlanta	L 107–116				The Omni	27–12
40	January 28, 1994	@ Philadelphia	W 108–103				The Spectrum	28–12
41	January 30, 1994	@ Boston	L 94–106				Boston Garden	28–13

February: 8–4 (home: 7–0; road: 1–4)

Game	Date	Team	Score	High points	High rebounds	High assists	Location Attendance	Record
42	February 1, 1994	L.A. Clippers	W 108–106				America West Arena	29–13
43	February 3, 1994	@ Portland	L 105–126				Memorial Coliseum	29–14
44	February 6, 1994	Chicago	W 89–88				America West Arena	30–14
45	February 8, 1994	@ L.A. Lakers	L 104–107				Great Western Forum	30–15
46	February 9, 1994	Minnesota	W 111–106				America West Arena	31–15
All-Star Break
47	February 16, 1994	Portland	W 126–100				America West Arena	32–15
48	February 18, 1994	L.A. Lakers	W 113–96				America West Arena	33–15
49	February 19, 1994	@ Houston	L 88–106				The Summit	33–16
50	February 21, 1994	Sacramento	W 112–86				America West Arena	34–16
51	February 24, 1994	@ Minnesota	W 120–101				Target Center	35–16
52	February 25, 1994	@ Utah	L 87–107				Delta Center	35–17
53	February 27, 1994	New York	W 92–78				America West Arena	36–17

March: 10–6 (home: 5–2; road: 5–4)

Game	Date	Team	Score	High points	High rebounds	High assists	Location Attendance	Record
54	March 3, 1994	@ Golden State	L 107–120				Oakland-Alameda County Coliseum Arena	36–18
55	March 4, 1994	Minnesota	W 106–101				America West Arena	37–18
56	March 6, 1994	Utah	L 92–103				America West Arena	37–19
57	March 8, 1994	@ Charlotte	L 89–97				Charlotte Coliseum	37–20
58	March 9, 1994	@ Washington	W 142–106				USAir Arena	38–20
59	March 11, 1994	@ Miami	W 122–107				Miami Arena	39–20
60	March 13, 1994	@ Orlando	W 100–93				Orlando Arena	40–20
61	March 15, 1994	@ Cleveland	W 119–106				Richfield Coliseum	41–20
62	March 16, 1994	@ Indiana	L 98–109				Market Square Arena	41–21
63	March 18, 1994	Detroit	L 113–114				America West Arena	41–22
64	March 19, 1994	New Jersey	W 105–93				America West Arena	42–22
65	March 22, 1994	Miami	W 124–118 (OT)				America West Arena	43–22
66	March 24, 1994	@ Seattle	L 106–116				Seattle Center Coliseum	43–23
67	March 25, 1994	Dallas	W 99–94				America West Arena	44–23
68	March 27, 1994	Houston	W 113–98				America West Arena	45–23
69	March 31, 1994	@ L.A. Clippers	W 117–102				Los Angeles Memorial Sports Arena	46–23

April: 10–3 (home: 7–0; road: 3–3)

Game	Date	Team	Score	High points	High rebounds	High assists	Location Attendance	Record
70	April 1, 1994	Atlanta	W 93–87				America West Arena	47–23
71	April 3, 1994	Denver	W 108–98				America West Arena	48–23
72	April 5, 1994	@ Portland	L 113–135				Memorial Coliseum	48–24
73	April 6, 1994	San Antonio	W 107–95				America West Arena	49–24
74	April 8, 1994	@ Sacramento	L 101–104				ARCO Arena	49–25
75	April 10, 1994	@ Seattle	L 108–111				Seattle Center Coliseum	49–26
76	April 12, 1994	@ Denver	W 107–102				McNichols Sports Arena	50–26
77	April 13, 1994	L.A. Lakers	W 117–88				America West Arena	51–26
78	April 16, 1994	@ San Antonio	W 96–94				Alamodome	52–26
79	April 18, 1994	@ Dallas	W 106–97				Reunion Arena	53–26
80	April 19, 1994	Seattle	W 122–116				America West Arena	54–26
81	April 22, 1994	L.A. Clippers	W 127–121				America West Arena	55–26
82	April 23, 1994	Sacramento	W 101–100				America West Arena	56–26

1993–94 schedule

== Playoffs ==
=== Game log ===
1994 playoff game log
First Round: 3–0 (home: 2–0; road: 1–0)

Game	Date	Team	Score	High points	High rebounds	High assists	Location Attendance	Series
1	April 29, 1994	Golden State	W 111–104	Charles Barkley (36)	Charles Barkley (19)	Barkley, Johnson (7)	America West Arena; 19,023	1–0
2	May 1, 1994	Golden State	W 117–111	Kevin Johnson (38)	A.C. Green (10)	Kevin Johnson (9)	America West Arena; 19,023	2–0
3	May 4, 1994	@ Golden State	W 140–133	Charles Barkley (56)	Charles Barkley (14)	Kevin Johnson (12)	Oakland-Alameda County Coliseum Arena; 15,025	3–0

Conference semifinals: 3–4 (home: 1–2; road: 2–2)

Game	Date	Team	Score	High points	High rebounds	High assists	Location Attendance	Series
1	May 8, 1994	@ Houston	W 91–87	Charles Barkley (21)	Charles Barkley (12)	Kevin Johnson (12)	The Summit; 15,073	1–0
2	May 11, 1994	@ Houston	W 124–117 (OT)	Charles Barkley (34)	Charles Barkley (15)	Barkley, Johnson (6)	The Summit; 16,611	2–0
3	May 13, 1994	Houston	L 102–118	Kevin Johnson (38)	Charles Barkley (14)	Kevin Johnson (12)	America West Arena; 19,023	2–1
4	May 15, 1994	Houston	L 96–107	Kevin Johnson (38)	Charles Barkley (14)	Kevin Johnson (12)	America West Arena; 19,023	2–2
5	May 17, 1994	@ Houston	L 86–109	Charles Barkley (30)	Oliver Miller (7)	Henry, Miller (3)	The Summit; 16,611	2–3
6	May 19, 1994	Houston	W 103–89	Kevin Johnson (28)	Charles Barkley (15)	Kevin Johnson (13)	America West Arena; 19,023	3–3
7	May 21, 1994	@ Houston	L 94–104	Kevin Johnson (25)	Charles Barkley (15)	Kevin Johnson (11)	The Summit; 16,611	3–4

1994 schedule

== Awards and honors ==
- During the preseason period, the Suns would win the 1993 McDonald's Open championship from October 21-23, winning the championship match over Italy's Buckler Beer Bologna.

=== Week/Month ===
- Charles Barkley was named Player of the Week for games played November 15 through November 21.
- Oliver Miller was named Player of the Week for games played December 27 through January 2.

=== All-Star ===
- Charles Barkley was voted as a starter for the Western Conference in the All-Star Game. It was his eighth consecutive All-Star selection. Barkley led all players in voting with 794,936 votes. Barkley was unable to play due to injury and was replaced by Gary Payton.
- Kevin Johnson was selected as a reserve for the Western Conference in the All-Star Game. It was his third All-Star selection. Johnson finished third in voting among Western Conference guards with 431,885 votes.
- Other Suns players receiving All-Star votes were A.C. Green (368,601) and Dan Majerle (329,618).

=== Season ===
- Charles Barkley was named to the All-NBA Second Team. Barkley also finished tenth in MVP voting.
- Kevin Johnson was named to the All-NBA Second Team. Johnson also finished 11th in MVP voting.
- Dan Majerle led the league in three-point field goals with 192.

== Player statistics ==
Legend
GP	Games played	GS	Games started	MPG	Minutes per game
FG%	Field-goal percentage	3P%	3-point field-goal percentage	FT%	Free-throw percentage
RPG	Rebounds per game	APG	Assists per game	SPG	Steals per game
BPG	Blocks per game	PPG	Points per game

=== Season ===
Player	GP	GS	MPG	FG%	3P%	FT%	RPG	APG	SPG	BPG	PPG
Danny Ainge	68	1	22.9	.417	.328	.830^	1.9	2.6	.8	.1	8.9
Charles Barkley	65	65	35.4	.495	.270	.704	11.2	4.6	1.6	.6	21.6
Cedric Ceballos	53	43	30.2	.535	.000	.724	6.5	1.7	1.1	.4	19.1
Duane Cooper	23	2	5.9	.439	.143	.733	0.4	1.2	.1	.0	2.1
Joe Courtney*	33	1	5.1	.513	.	.719	0.8	0.3	.1	.2	3.1
A.C. Green	82	55	34.5	.502	.229	.735	9.2	1.7	.9	.5	14.7
Skeeter Henry	4	0	3.8	.200	.000	.500	0.5	1.0	.0	.0	1.0
Frank Johnson	70	5	12.5	.448	.167	.783	1.2	2.1	.6	.0	4.6
Kevin Johnson	67	67	36.6	.487	.222	.819^	2.5	9.5	1.9	.1	20.0
Joe Kleine	74	4	11.5	.488	.455†	.769	2.6	0.6	.2	.3	3.9
Negele Knight*	1	0	8.0	.250	.	.	0.0	0.0	.0	1.0	2.0
Malcolm Mackey	22	0	3.1	.378	.000	.500	1.1	0.0	.0	.1	1.5
Dan Majerle	80	76	40.1	.418	.382†	.739	4.4	3.4	1.6	.5	16.5
Oliver Miller	69	30	25.9	.609	.222	.584	6.9	3.5	1.2	2.3	9.2
Jerrod Mustaf	33	2	5.9	.357	.	.591	1.7	0.2	.1	.2	2.2
Elliot Perry	27	9	16.0	.372	.000	.750	1.4	4.6	.9	.0	3.9
Mark West	82	50	15.1	.566	.	.500	3.6	0.4	.4	1.3	4.7

* – Stats with the Suns.
† – Minimum 50 three-pointers made.
^ – Minimum 125 free-throws made.

=== Playoffs ===
Player	GP	GS	MPG	FG%	3P%	FT%	RPG	APG	SPG	BPG	PPG
Danny Ainge	10	0	23.0	.458	.425	.714	2.3	2.1	.6	.1	8.6
Charles Barkley	10	10	42.5	.509†	.350	.764	13.0	4.8	2.5	.9	27.6
Cedric Ceballos	10	8	21.2	.462	.000	.833	4.4	0.8	.8	.2	10.1
A.C. Green	10	2	35.0	.482	.412	.613	8.4	1.3	1.0	.2	12.5
Skeeter Henry	3	0	5.3	.167	.000	.	1.0	1.0	.0	.0	0.7
Frank Johnson	7	0	6.6	.083	.000	.500	0.6	0.7	.3	.0	0.4
Kevin Johnson	10	10	42.7	.458	.300	.852	3.5	9.6	1.0	.1	26.6
Joe Kleine	8	0	10.1	.429	.	.667	2.1	0.4	.1	.5	3.5
Dan Majerle	10	10	41.0	.362	.339	.688	4.3	2.4	1.1	.4	12.3
Oliver Miller	10	4	14.6	.593†	.	.429	4.4	1.3	.6	1.2	3.5
Elliot Perry	4	0	3.3	.143	.	.	0.0	0.3	.3	.0	0.5
Mark West	7	6	9.9	.333	.	.700	2.9	0.0	.0	1.0	2.4

† – Minimum 20 field goals made.

Player statistics citation:

== Transactions ==
=== Trades ===
November 8, 1993	To San Antonio Spurs (United States) Negele Knight	To Phoenix Suns 1994 second-round draft pick ( (United States) Antonio Lang)

=== Free agents ===
==== Additions ====
Date	Player	Contract	Old Team
July 23, 1993	Richard Dumas	Re-signed to multi-year contract	Phoenix Suns
July 28, 1993	Frank Johnson	Re-signed to 1-year contract for $500,000	Phoenix Suns
August 13, 1993	Joe Kleine	Signed to 4-year contract for $3.8 million	Boston Celtics
August 26, 1993	Cedric Ceballos	Re-signed to 5-year contract for $11 million	Phoenix Suns
September 3, 1993	Joe Courtney	Signed to 1-year contract for $150,000	Golden State Warriors
September 28, 1993	A.C. Green	Signed to 5-year contract for $15.1 million	Los Angeles Lakers
October 7, 1993	Rod Higgins	Undisclosed	Sacramento Kings
November 10, 1993	Duane Cooper	Signed to 1-year contract for $150,000	Los Angeles Lakers
January 22, 1994	Elliot Perry	Signed to two 10-day contracts	Grand Rapids Hoops (CBA)
February 11, 1994	Elliot Perry	Signed for rest of season	Phoenix Suns
April 15, 1994	Skeeter Henry	Signed for rest of season	Dijon (France)

==== Subtractions ====
Date	Player	Reason left	New team
June 25, 1993	Tom Chambers	Free agent	Utah Jazz
October 16, 1993	Byron Wilson	Waived	Oklahoma City Cavalry (CBA)
November 2, 1993	Rod Higgins	Waived	Cleveland Cavaliers
January 21, 1994	Tim Kempton	Waived	Charlotte Hornets
February 26, 1994	Joe Courtney	Waived	Milwaukee Bucks

Player Transactions Citation:
