= Skeeter Henry =

American basketball player (born 1967)

Personal information
- Born: December 8, 1967 (age 58) Dallas, Texas, U.S.
- Listed height: 6 ft 7 in (2.01 m)
- Listed weight: 190 lb (86 kg)

Career information
- High school: South Grand Prairie (Grand Prairie, Texas)
- College: Midland (1986–1988); Oklahoma (1988–1990)
- NBA draft: 1990: undrafted
- Position: Shooting guard
- Number: 4

Career history
- 1994: Phoenix Suns

Career highlights
- French League Best Scorer (1994)
- Stats at NBA.com
- Stats at Basketball Reference

Herman "Skeeter" Henry (born December 8, 1967) is an American former professional basketball player. He played college basketball for the Oklahoma Sooners.

== College career ==
After attending high school at South Grand Prairie High School, in Grand Prairie, Texas, Henry played college basketball at the University of Oklahoma.

== Professional career ==
Henry, who was not drafted by an NBA team, played in seven games with the Phoenix Suns, four at the end of the 1993–94 NBA season, and 3 playoff games.

=== Teams ===
- 1990–1991 : Pensacola Tornados (CBA)
- 1991–1992 : Birmingham Bandits (CBA)
- 1992–1994 : Dijon (Pro A); Phoenix Suns (NBA)
- 1994–1995 : Dijon (Pro A); Grand Rapids Hoops (CBA); Real Madrid (Liga ACB)
- 1995–1996 : Sioux Falls Skyforce (CBA); Panteras de Miranda; Karşıyaka Izmir
- 1996–1997 : Montpellier Basket (Pro A)
- 1997–1998 : Cholet (Pro A)
- 1998–1999 : Toulouse (Pro A)
- 1999–2000 : Illiabum Clube
- 2000–2001 : Dijon (Pro A)
- 2001–2002 : Le Havre (Pro A)
