= 1993–94 Denver Nuggets season =

NBA professional basketball team season

- Head coach: Dan Issel
- President: Bernie Bickerstaff
- General manager: Bernie Bickerstaff
- Arena: McNichols Sports Arena

Results
- Record: 42–40 (.512)
- Place: Division: 4th (Midwest); Conference: 8th (Western)
- Playoff finish: Conference Semi-finals (lost to Jazz 3–4)
- Stats at Basketball Reference

Local media
- Television: KWGN-TV; Prime Sports Rocky Mountain
- Radio: KOA

The 1993–94 Denver Nuggets season was the 18th season for the Denver Nuggets in the National Basketball Association, and their 27th season as a franchise.

== Season summary ==
=== Off-season ===
The Nuggets received the ninth overall pick in the 1993 NBA draft, and selected power forward Rodney Rogers out of Wake Forest University. During the off-season, the team acquired Brian Williams from the Orlando Magic.

For the season, the Nuggets redesigned their primary logo, replacing the rainbow colors from their previous skyline logo with gold, dark navy blue and dark red to their color scheme of white. The team's primary logo featured a dark navy blue and white snowcapped mountain with a dark red outline, above a dark red sign with a gold outline featuring the city name "Denver" in white letters; below the mountain and city name featured the team name "Nuggets" in gold letters with a white outline, in front of a dark navy blue background surrounded by a dark red outline. The team also redesigned their home and road uniforms, removing the skyline logo from the front of their jerseys, and adding a dark red and dark navy blue trim; the home uniforms remained white, while the road uniforms were changed from blue to dark navy blue.

The team's new primary logo, and new uniforms would both remain in use until 2003, while the basic design of the logo would last until 2018.

=== Regular season ===
During the first month of the regular season, the Nuggets traded Mark Macon and Marcus Liberty to the Detroit Pistons in exchange for All-Star guard Alvin Robertson; however, Robertson never played for the Nuggets due to a back injury he sustained with the Pistons, and was out for the entire season. With the addition of Rogers and Brian Williams, the Nuggets played around .500 in winning percentage all season long; the team got off to a 9–8 start to the regular season, but then posted a five-game losing streak in December afterwards. The team then posted a five-game winning streak also in December, and later on held a 22–25 record at the All-Star break. The Nuggets won five of their final seven games of the season, and finished in fourth place in the Midwest Division with a 42–40 record, earning the eighth seed in the Western Conference; the team qualified for the NBA playoffs for the first time since the 1989–90 season.

Last season's Most Improved Player Mahmoud Abdul-Rauf averaged 18.0 points and 4.5 assists per game, while second-year star LaPhonso Ellis averaged 15.4 points and 8.6 rebounds per game, and Dikembe Mutombo provided the team with 12.0 points, 11.8 rebounds and 4.1 blocks per game. In addition, Reggie Williams provided with 13.0 points and 1.4 steals per game, and second-year guard Bryant Stith contributed 12.5 points and 1.4 steals per game. Off the bench, Robert Pack provided with 9.6 points and 5.4 assists per game, while Rogers contributed 8.1 points per game, and Brian Williams averaged 8.0 points and 5.6 rebounds per game.

During the NBA All-Star weekend at the Target Center in Minneapolis, Minnesota, Pack participated in the NBA Slam Dunk Contest. Mutombo finished in third place in Defensive Player of the Year voting, while Brian Williams finished tied in seventh place in Most Improved Player voting. The Nuggets finished eleventh in the NBA in home-game attendance, with an attendance of 673,738 at the McNichols Sports Arena during the regular season.

=== NBA playoffs ===
In the Western Conference First Round of the 1994 NBA playoffs, the Nuggets faced off against the top–seeded, and Pacific Division champion Seattle SuperSonics, who were led by the All-Star trio of Shawn Kemp, Gary Payton and Detlef Schrempf. The Nuggets lost the first two games to the SuperSonics on the road at the Seattle Center Coliseum, as the SuperSonics took a 2–0 series lead. However, the team managed to win the next two games at home, which included a Game 4 win over the SuperSonics at the McNichols Sports Arena in overtime, 94–85 to even the series. The Nuggets won Game 5 over the SuperSonics at the Seattle Center Coliseum in overtime, 98–94 to win in a hard-fought five-game series, and became the first 8th-seeded team to beat a #1 seed; an on-court camera featured Mutombo, in jubilation on his back holding the ball after the buzzer.

In the Western Conference Semi-finals, the team faced off against the 5th–seeded Utah Jazz, who were led by the trio of All-Star forward Karl Malone, All-Star guard John Stockton, and Jeff Hornacek. The Nuggets lost the first three games to the Jazz, which included a Game 3 home loss at the McNichols Sports Arena in overtime, 111–109, as the Jazz took a 3–0 series lead. Despite the threat of elimination, the Nuggets managed to win the next three games, including a Game 6 win over the Jazz at the McNichols Sports Arena, 94–91 to even the series. However, the Nuggets lost Game 7 to the Jazz on the road, 91–81 at the Delta Center, thus losing in a hard-fought seven-game series.

=== Aftermath ===
Following the season, Robertson was released to free agency.

== Draft picks ==
| Round | Pick | Player | Position | Nationality | School/Club team |
|---|---|---|---|---|---|
| 1 | 9 | Rodney Rogers | SF/PF | United States | Wake Forest |
| 2 | 43 | Josh Grant | F | United States | Utah |

== Roster ==
1993–94 Denver Nuggets roster
Players

| Pos. | No. | Player | Height | Weight | DOB | From |
|---|---|---|---|---|---|---|
| G | 3 | Mahmoud Abdul-Rauf | 6 ft 1 in (1.85 m) | 162 lb (73 kg) | 1969–03–09 | LSU |
| F | 43 | Kevin Brooks | 6 ft 6 in (1.98 m) | 200 lb (91 kg) | 1969–10–12 | Louisiana |
| F | 20 | LaPhonso Ellis | 6 ft 8 in (2.03 m) | 240 lb (109 kg) | 1970–05–05 | Notre Dame |
| F | 21 | Tom Hammonds | 6 ft 9 in (2.06 m) | 215 lb (98 kg) | 1967–03–27 | Georgia Tech |
| G | 4 | Darnell Mee | 6 ft 5 in (1.96 m) | 175 lb (79 kg) | 1971–02–11 | Western Kentucky |
| C | 55 | Dikembe Mutombo | 7 ft 2 in (2.18 m) | 245 lb (111 kg) | 1966–06–25 | Georgetown |
| G | 14 | Robert Pack | 6 ft 2 in (1.88 m) | 180 lb (82 kg) | 1969–02–03 | USC |
| F | 42 | Mark Randall | 6 ft 8 in (2.03 m) | 235 lb (107 kg) | 1967–09–30 | Kansas |
| G | – | Alvin Robertson (injured) (IN) | 6 ft 4 in (1.93 m) | 208 lb (94 kg) | 1962-07-22 | Arkansas |
| F | 54 | Rodney Rogers | 6 ft 7 in (2.01 m) | 235 lb (107 kg) | 1971–06–20 | Wake Forest |
| G | 23 | Bryant Stith | 6 ft 5 in (1.96 m) | 208 lb (94 kg) | 1970–12–10 | Virginia |
| C | 8 | Brian Williams | 6 ft 11 in (2.11 m) | 260 lb (118 kg) | 1969–04–06 | Arizona |
| F | 34 | Reggie Williams | 6 ft 7 in (2.01 m) | 190 lb (86 kg) | 1964–03–05 | Georgetown |

Coaches
Head coach
- Dan Issel
Assistant(s)
- Mike Evans
- Gene Littles

Legend
- (DP) Unsigned draft pick
- (FA) Free agent
- (S) Suspended
- (IN) Inactive
- Injured

Roster
Updated: March 7, 1994

=== Roster notes ===
- Shooting guard Alvin Robertson was on the injured reserve list due to a back injury, missed the entire regular season, and never played for the Nuggets.

== Regular season ==
=== Season standings ===
| Midwest Division | W | L | PCT | GB | Home | Road | Div |
|---|---|---|---|---|---|---|---|
| y-Houston Rockets | 58 | 24 | .707 | — | 35–6 | 23–18 | 15–11 |
| x-San Antonio Spurs | 55 | 27 | .671 | 3 | 32–9 | 23–18 | 16–10 |
| x-Utah Jazz | 53 | 29 | .646 | 5 | 33–8 | 20–21 | 21–5 |
| x-Denver Nuggets | 42 | 40 | .512 | 16 | 28–13 | 14–27 | 14–12 |
| Minnesota Timberwolves | 20 | 62 | .244 | 38 | 13–28 | 7–34 | 5–21 |
| Dallas Mavericks | 13 | 69 | .159 | 45 | 6–35 | 7–34 | 7–19 |

| # | Western Conference | | | | |
| # | Team | W | L | PCT | GB |
|---|---|---|---|---|---|
| 1 | z-Seattle SuperSonics | 63 | 19 | .768 | – |
| 2 | y-Houston Rockets | 58 | 24 | .707 | 5 |
| 3 | x-Phoenix Suns | 56 | 26 | .683 | 7 |
| 4 | x-San Antonio Spurs | 55 | 27 | .671 | 8 |
| 5 | x-Utah Jazz | 53 | 29 | .646 | 10 |
| 6 | x-Golden State Warriors | 50 | 32 | .610 | 13 |
| 7 | x-Portland Trail Blazers | 47 | 35 | .573 | 16 |
| 8 | x-Denver Nuggets | 42 | 40 | .512 | 21 |
| 9 | Los Angeles Lakers | 33 | 49 | .402 | 30 |
| 10 | Sacramento Kings | 28 | 54 | .341 | 35 |
| 11 | Los Angeles Clippers | 27 | 55 | .329 | 36 |
| 12 | Minnesota Timberwolves | 20 | 62 | .244 | 43 |
| 13 | Dallas Mavericks | 13 | 69 | .159 | 50 |

z – clinched division title
y – clinched division title
x – clinched playoff spot

== Game log ==
=== Regular season ===
1993–94 game log
Total: 42–40 (home: 28–13; road: 14–27)
November: 6–7 (home: 4–2; road: 2–5)

| Game | Date | Team | Score | High points | High rebounds | High assists | Location Attendance | Record |
|---|---|---|---|---|---|---|---|---|
| 1 | November 5, 1993 | @ Sacramento | L 100–109 | | | | ARCO Arena | 0–1 |
| 2 | November 7, 1993 | L.A. Clippers | W 99–97 | | | | McNichols Sports Arena | 1–1 |
| 3 | November 9, 1993 | @ Seattle | L 86–118 | | | | Seattle Center Coliseum | 1–2 |
| 4 | November 12, 1993 | @ L.A. Lakers | W 113–84 | | | | Great Western Forum | 2–2 |
| 5 | November 13, 1993 | Golden State | L 98–106 | | | | McNichols Sports Arena | 2–3 |
| 6 | November 16, 1993 | San Antonio | L 74–86 | | | | McNichols Sports Arena | 2–4 |
| 7 | November 18, 1993 | Cleveland | W 100–93 | | | | McNichols Sports Arena | 3–4 |
| 8 | November 20, 1993 | @ Minnesota | W 90–89 | | | | Target Center | 4–4 |
| 9 | November 23, 1993 | @ Portland | L 94–109 | | | | Memorial Coliseum | 4–5 |
| 10 | November 24, 1993 | @ Phoenix | L 97–130 | | | | America West Arena | 4–6 |
| 11 | November 26, 1993 | Portland | W 112–101 | | | | McNichols Sports Arena | 5–6 |
| 12 | November 27, 1993 | New Jersey | W 111–89 | | | | McNichols Sports Arena | 6–6 |
| 13 | November 30, 1993 | @ Utah | L 92–103 | | | | Delta Center | 6–7 |

December: 8–6 (home: 6–0; road: 2–6)

| Game | Date | Team | Score | High points | High rebounds | High assists | Location Attendance | Record |
|---|---|---|---|---|---|---|---|---|
| 14 | December 3, 1993 | Charlotte | W 102–94 | | | | McNichols Sports Arena | 7–7 |
| 15 | December 5, 1993 | Dallas | W 115–110 | | | | McNichols Sports Arena | 8–7 |
| 16 | December 7, 1993 | @ Golden State | L 90–95 | | | | Oakland-Alameda County Coliseum Arena | 8–8 |
| 17 | December 10, 1993 | Utah | W 107–98 | | | | McNichols Sports Arena | 9–8 |
| 18 | December 11, 1993 | @ San Antonio | L 100–105 | | | | Alamodome | 9–9 |
| 19 | December 14, 1993 | @ New York | L 84–93 | | | | Madison Square Garden | 9–10 |
| 20 | December 15, 1993 | @ Philadelphia | L 93–101 | | | | The Spectrum | 9–11 |
| 21 | December 17, 1993 | @ Charlotte | L 96–99 | | | | Charlotte Coliseum | 9–12 |
| 22 | December 18, 1993 | @ Atlanta | L 96–102 | | | | The Omni | 9–13 |
| 23 | December 21, 1993 | Phoenix | W 121–95 | | | | McNichols Sports Arena | 10–13 |
| 24 | December 23, 1993 | @ Houston | W 106–93 | | | | The Summit | 11–13 |
| 25 | December 26, 1993 | Minnesota | W 100–97 | | | | McNichols Sports Arena | 12–13 |
| 26 | December 28, 1993 | @ Dallas | W 97–85 | | | | Reunion Arena | 13–13 |
| 27 | December 30, 1993 | Golden State | W 101–96 | | | | McNichols Sports Arena | 14–13 |

January: 6–8 (home: 5–4; road: 1–4)

| Game | Date | Team | Score | High points | High rebounds | High assists | Location Attendance | Record |
|---|---|---|---|---|---|---|---|---|
| 28 | January 2, 1994 | Philadelphia | L 80–96 | | | | McNichols Sports Arena | 14–14 |
| 29 | January 4, 1994 | L.A. Lakers | L 118–119 | | | | McNichols Sports Arena | 14–15 |
| 30 | January 5, 1994 | @ Minnesota | L 95–109 | | | | Target Center | 14–16 |
| 31 | January 7, 1994 | San Antonio | L 76–84 | | | | McNichols Sports Arena | 14–17 |
| 32 | January 8, 1994 | Sacramento | W 104–98 | | | | McNichols Sports Arena | 15–17 |
| 33 | January 11, 1994 | @ Detroit | W 94–86 | | | | The Palace of Auburn Hills | 16–17 |
| 34 | January 12, 1994 | @ Indiana | L 96–107 | | | | Market Square Arena | 16–18 |
| 35 | January 14, 1994 | @ New Jersey | L 96–103 | | | | Brendan Byrne Arena | 16–19 |
| 36 | January 16, 1994 | @ Boston | L 100–105 | | | | Boston Garden | 16–20 |
| 37 | January 18, 1994 | Portland | L 103–104 (OT) | | | | McNichols Sports Arena | 17–20 |
| 38 | January 20, 1994 | Houston | W 111–106 (2OT) | | | | McNichols Sports Arena | 17–21 |
| 39 | January 22, 1994 | Seattle | W 98–91 | | | | McNichols Sports Arena | 18–21 |
| 40 | January 27, 1994 | Indiana | W 113–106 | | | | McNichols Sports Arena | 19–21 |
| 41 | January 29, 1994 | Detroit | W 129–110 | | | | McNichols Sports Arena | 20–21 |

February: 7–7 (home: 4–2; road: 3–5)

| Game | Date | Team | Score | High points | High rebounds | High assists | Location Attendance | Record |
|---|---|---|---|---|---|---|---|---|
| 42 | February 1, 1994 | Chicago | L 98–118 | | | | McNichols Sports Arena | 20–22 |
| 43 | February 2, 1994 | @ Golden State | L 84–97 | | | | Oakland-Alameda County Coliseum Arena | 20–23 |
| 44 | February 4, 1994 | @ Sacramento | W 108–83 | | | | ARCO Arena | 21–23 |
| 45 | February 6, 1994 | Dallas | W 99–89 | | | | McNichols Sports Arena | 22–23 |
| 46 | February 8, 1994 | Utah | L 95–96 | | | | McNichols Sports Arena | 22–24 |
| 47 | February 10, 1994 | @ San Antonio | L 87–94 | | | | Alamodome | 22–25 |
All-Star Break
| 48 | February 15, 1994 | @ Cleveland | L 99–111 | | | | Richfield Coliseum | 22–26 |
| 49 | February 16, 1994 | @ Milwaukee | W 107–95 | | | | Bradley Center | 23–26 |
| 50 | February 18, 1994 | @ Chicago | W 109–84 | | | | Chicago Stadium | 24–26 |
| 51 | February 20, 1994 | Atlanta | W 97–92 | | | | McNichols Sports Arena | 25–26 |
| 52 | February 22, 1994 | @ Houston | L 97–98 | | | | The Summit | 25–27 |
| 53 | February 23, 1994 | Boston | W 102–94 | | | | McNichols Sports Arena | 26–27 |
| 54 | February 25, 1994 | New York | W 102–94 | | | | McNichols Sports Arena | 27–27 |
| 55 | February 27, 1994 | @ Portland | L 97–104 | | | | Memorial Coliseum | 27–28 |

March: 8–5 (home: 7–1; road: 1–4)

| Game | Date | Team | Score | High points | High rebounds | High assists | Location Attendance | Record |
|---|---|---|---|---|---|---|---|---|
| 56 | March 4, 1994 | Orlando | W 98–89 | | | | McNichols Sports Arena | 28–28 |
| 57 | March 6, 1994 | Minnesota | W 117–97 | | | | McNichols Sports Arena | 29–28 |
| 58 | March 8, 1994 | @ Orlando | L 88–95 | | | | Orlando Arena | 29–29 |
| 59 | March 9, 1994 | @ Miami | L 80–102 | | | | Miami Arena | 29–30 |
| 60 | March 11, 1994 | @ Washington | L 93–100 | | | | USAir Arena | 29–31 |
| 61 | March 14, 1994 | San Antonio | W 116–88 | | | | McNichols Sports Arena | 30–31 |
| 62 | March 17, 1994 | @ L.A. Clippers | W 102–99 | | | | Los Angeles Memorial Sports Arena | 31–31 |
| 63 | March 18, 1994 | Sacramento | L 103–115 | | | | McNichols Sports Arena | 31–32 |
| 64 | March 20, 1994 | Washington | W 132–99 | | | | McNichols Sports Arena | 32–32 |
| 65 | March 22, 1994 | Milwaukee | W 108–94 | | | | McNichols Sports Arena | 33–32 |
| 66 | March 24, 1994 | Miami | W 113–101 | | | | McNichols Sports Arena | 34–32 |
| 67 | March 26, 1994 | Dallas | W 112–101 | | | | McNichols Sports Arena | 35–32 |
| 68 | March 28, 1994 | @ Seattle | L 97–111 | | | | Seattle Center Coliseum | 35–33 |

April: 7–7 (home: 2–4; road: 5–3)

| Game | Date | Team | Score | High points | High rebounds | High assists | Location Attendance | Record |
|---|---|---|---|---|---|---|---|---|
| 69 | April 2, 1994 | @ Utah | L 91–101 | | | | Delta Center | 35–34 |
| 70 | April 3, 1994 | @ Phoenix | L 98–108 | | | | America West Arena | 35–35 |
| 71 | April 5, 1994 | L.A. Clippers | L 91–92 | | | | McNichols Sports Arena | 35–36 |
| 72 | April 7, 1994 | Seattle | W 104–90 | | | | McNichols Sports Arena | 36–36 |
| 73 | April 8, 1994 | @ L.A. Lakers | W 112–99 | | | | Great Western Forum | 37–36 |
| 74 | April 10, 1994 | Houston | L 92–93 | | | | McNichols Sports Arena | 37–37 |
| 75 | April 12, 1994 | Phoenix | L 102–107 | | | | McNichols Sports Arena | 37–38 |
| 76 | April 13, 1994 | @ San Antonio | W 83–78 | | | | Alamodome | 38–38 |
| 77 | April 15, 1994 | @ Dallas | L 97–99 | | | | Reunion Arena | 38–39 |
| 78 | April 17, 1994 | @ Minnesota | W 99–88 | | | | Target Center | 39–39 |
| 79 | April 19, 1994 | L.A. Lakers | W 105–98 | | | | McNichols Sports Arena | 40–39 |
| 80 | April 20, 1994 | @ L.A. Clippers | W 100–85 | | | | Los Angeles Memorial Sports Arena | 41–39 |
| 81 | April 22, 1994 | Utah | L 106–113 | | | | McNichols Sports Arena | 41–40 |
| 82 | April 24, 1994 | @ Houston | W 115–107 | | | | The Summit | 42–40 |

1993–94 schedule

=== Playoffs ===
1994 playoff game log
Western Conference First Round: 3–2 (home: 2–0; road: 1–2)

| Game | Date | Team | Score | High points | High rebounds | High assists | Location Attendance | Series |
|---|---|---|---|---|---|---|---|---|
| 1 | April 28, 1994 | @ Seattle | L 82–106 | Bison Dele (15) | Dikembe Mutombo (9) | Robert Pack (4) | Seattle Center Coliseum; 14,813 | 0–1 |
| 2 | April 30, 1994 | @ Seattle | L 87–97 | LaPhonso Ellis (18) | Ellis, Dele (10) | Dikembe Mutombo (5) | Seattle Center Coliseum; 14,813 | 0–2 |
| 3 | May 2, 1994 | Seattle | W 110–93 | Reggie Williams (31) | Dikembe Mutombo (13) | Reggie Williams (8) | McNichols Sports Arena; 17,171 | 1–2 |
| 4 | May 5, 1994 | Seattle | W 94–85 (OT) | LaPhonso Ellis (27) | LaPhonso Ellis (17) | Reggie Williams (6) | McNichols Sports Arena; 17,171 | 2–2 |
| 5 | May 7, 1994 | @ Seattle | W 98–94 (OT) | Robert Pack (23) | Bison Dele (19) | Reggie Williams (5) | Seattle Center Coliseum; 14,813 | 3–2 |

Western Conference semifinals: 3–4 (home: 2–1; road: 1–3)

| Game | Date | Team | Score | High points | High rebounds | High assists | Location Attendance | Series |
|---|---|---|---|---|---|---|---|---|
| 1 | May 10, 1994 | @ Utah | L 91–100 | Dikembe Mutombo (20) | LaPhonso Ellis (12) | Mahmoud Abdul-Rauf (5) | Delta Center; 19,911 | 0–1 |
| 2 | May 12, 1994 | @ Utah | L 94–104 | Mahmoud Abdul-Rauf (23) | Dikembe Mutombo (13) | Robert Pack (6) | Delta Center; 19,911 | 0–2 |
| 3 | May 14, 1994 | Utah | L 109–111 (OT) | LaPhonso Ellis (25) | Dikembe Mutombo (13) | Robert Pack (8) | McNichols Sports Arena; 17,171 | 0–3 |
| 4 | May 15, 1994 | Utah | W 83–82 | Reggie Williams (21) | Dikembe Mutombo (11) | Mahmoud Abdul-Rauf (6) | McNichols Sports Arena; 17,171 | 1–3 |
| 5 | May 17, 1994 | @ Utah | W 109–101 (2OT) | Stith, Abdul-Rauf (22) | LaPhonso Ellis (11) | Robert Pack (7) | Delta Center; 19,911 | 2–3 |
| 6 | May 19, 1994 | Utah | W 94–91 | Dikembe Mutombo (23) | Dikembe Mutombo (12) | three players tied (2) | McNichols Sports Arena; 17,171 | 3–3 |
| 7 | May 21, 1994 | @ Utah | L 81–91 | Reggie Williams (17) | Dikembe Mutombo (17) | Robert Pack (3) | Delta Center; 19,911 | 3–4 |

1994 schedule

== Playoffs ==
=== West First Round ===
(1) Seattle SuperSonics vs. (8) Denver Nuggets: Nuggets win series 3-2

- Game 1 @ Seattle Center Coliseum, Seattle (April 28): Seattle 106, Denver 82
- Game 2 @ Seattle Center Coliseum, Seattle (April 30): Seattle 97, Denver 87
- Game 3 @ McNichols Sports Arena, Denver (May 2): Denver 110, Seattle 93
- Game 4 @ McNichols Sports Arena, Denver (May 5): Denver 94, Seattle 85 (OT)
- Game 5 @ Seattle Center Coliseum, Seattle (May 7): Denver 98, Seattle 94 (OT)

Last Playoff Meeting: 1988 Western Conference First Round (Denver won 3–2)

=== West Conference Semi-finals ===
(5) Utah Jazz vs. (8) Denver Nuggets: Jazz win series 4-3

- Game 1 @ Delta Center, Salt Lake City (May 10): Utah 100, Denver 91
- Game 2 @ Delta Center, Salt Lake City (May 12): Utah 104, Denver 94
- Game 3 @ McNichols Sports Arena, Denver (May 14): Utah 111, Denver 109 (OT)
- Game 4 @ McNichols Sports Arena, Denver (May 15): Denver 83, Utah 82
- Game 5 @ Delta Center, Salt Lake City (May 17): Denver 109, Utah 101 (2OT)
- Game 6 @ McNichols Sports Arena, Denver (May 19): Denver 94, Utah 91
- Game 7 @ Delta Center, Salt Lake City (May 21): Utah 91, Denver 81

Last Playoff Meeting: 1985 Western Conference Semi-finals (Denver won 4–1)

== Player statistics ==
Legend
| GP | Games played | GS | Games started | MPG | Minutes per game |
| FG% | Field-goal percentage | 3P% | 3-point field-goal percentage | FT% | Free-throw percentage |
| RPG | Rebounds per game | APG | Assists per game | SPG | Steals per game |
| BPG | Blocks per game | PPG | Points per game |

=== Regular season ===
| Player | GP | GS | MPG | FG% | 3FG% | FT% | RPG | APG | SPG | BPG | PPG |
|---|---|---|---|---|---|---|---|---|---|---|---|
| Mahmoud Abdul-Rauf | 80 | 78 | 32.7 | .460 | .316 | .956 | 2.1 | 4.5 | 1.0 | 0.1 | 18.0 |
| LaPhonso Ellis | 79 | 79 | 34.2 | .502 | .304 | .674 | 8.6 | 2.1 | 0.8 | 1.0 | 15.4 |
| Reggie Williams | 82 | 68 | 32.4 | .412 | .278 | .733 | 4.8 | 3.7 | 1.4 | 0.8 | 13.0 |
| Bryant Stith | 82 | 82 | 34.8 | .450 | .222 | .829 | 4.3 | 2.4 | 1.4 | 0.2 | 12.5 |
| Dikembe Mutombo | 82 | 82 | 34.8 | .569 | .000 | .583 | 11.8 | 1.5 | 0.7 | 4.1 | 12.0 |
| Robert Pack | 66 | 4 | 20.9 | .443 | .207 | .758 | 1.9 | 5.4 | 1.2 | 0.1 | 9.6 |
| Rodney Rogers | 79 | 14 | 17.8 | .439 | .380 | .672 | 2.9 | 1.3 | 0.8 | 0.6 | 8.1 |
| Bison Dele | 80 | 1 | 18.8 | .541 | .000 | .649 | 5.6 | 0.6 | 0.6 | 1.1 | 8.0 |
| Mark Macon | 7 | 0 | 18.0 | .311 | .000 | .800 | 1.0 | 1.6 | 0.9 | 0.1 | 5.1 |
| Tom Hammonds | 74 | 2 | 11.9 | .500 | | .683 | 2.7 | 0.5 | 0.3 | 0.2 | 4.1 |
| Marcus Liberty | 3 | 0 | 3.7 | .571 | .000 | .500 | 1.7 | 0.7 | 0.0 | 0.0 | 3.0 |
| Adonis Jordan | 6 | 0 | 13.2 | .261 | .300 | | 1.0 | 3.2 | 0.0 | 0.2 | 2.5 |
| Kevin Brooks | 34 | 0 | 5.6 | .364 | .174 | .900 | 0.6 | 0.1 | 0.0 | 0.1 | 2.5 |
| Mark Randall | 28 | 0 | 5.5 | .340 | .143 | .786 | 0.8 | 0.4 | 0.3 | 0.1 | 2.1 |
| Darnell Mee | 38 | 0 | 7.5 | .318 | .208 | .444 | 0.9 | 0.4 | 0.4 | 0.3 | 1.9 |
| Jim Farmer | 4 | 0 | 7.3 | .333 | .000 | | 0.5 | 1.0 | 0.0 | 0.0 | 1.0 |
| Roy Marble | 5 | 0 | 6.4 | .167 | | .000 | 1.6 | 0.2 | 0.0 | 0.4 | 0.8 |

=== Playoffs ===
| Player | GP | GS | MPG | FG% | 3FG% | FT% | RPG | APG | SPG | BPG | PPG |
|---|---|---|---|---|---|---|---|---|---|---|---|
| LaPhonso Ellis | 12 | 12 | 36.3 | .479 | .500 | .704 | 8.1 | 2.2 | 0.8 | 0.9 | 14.8 |
| Reggie Williams | 12 | 12 | 33.8 | .416 | .400 | .771 | 5.1 | 3.5 | 0.8 | 1.0 | 14.3 |
| Dikembe Mutombo | 12 | 12 | 42.6 | .463 | | .602 | 12.0 | 1.8 | 0.7 | 5.8 | 13.3 |
| Mahmoud Abdul-Rauf | 12 | 12 | 28.3 | .370 | .324 | .935 | 1.5 | 2.5 | 0.4 | 0.1 | 12.9 |
| Robert Pack | 12 | 0 | 27.7 | .407 | .300 | .709 | 2.3 | 4.3 | 1.5 | 0.5 | 11.8 |
| Bryant Stith | 12 | 12 | 34.4 | .422 | .000 | .833 | 4.7 | 2.2 | 0.9 | 0.2 | 11.3 |
| Bison Dele | 12 | 0 | 24.1 | .553 | | .659 | 7.4 | 0.9 | 0.3 | 0.9 | 9.3 |
| Rodney Rogers | 12 | 0 | 15.8 | .388 | .316 | .630 | 1.8 | 1.3 | 0.6 | 0.5 | 5.1 |
| Kevin Brooks | 2 | 0 | 2.5 | .286 | .000 | .500 | 1.0 | 0.0 | 0.0 | 0.0 | 2.5 |
| Darnell Mee | 3 | 0 | 10.0 | .500 | .250 | | 0.7 | 0.7 | 1.0 | 0.0 | 2.3 |
| Tom Hammonds | 8 | 0 | 6.1 | .222 | | .833 | 1.6 | 0.3 | 0.0 | 0.0 | 1.1 |
| Mark Randall | 2 | 0 | 3.0 | .000 | | | 2.5 | 0.0 | 0.0 | 0.5 | 0.0 |

Player statistics citation:
