= LaPhonso Ellis =

American basketball player (born 1970)

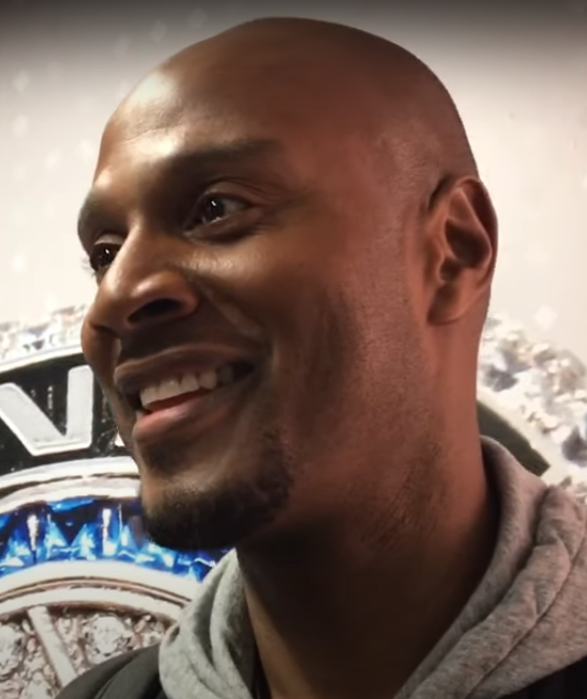
- Ellis in 2020

Personal information
- Born: May 5, 1970 (age 56) East St. Louis, Illinois, U.S.
- Listed height: 6 ft 8 in (2.03 m)
- Listed weight: 240 lb (109 kg)

Career information
- High school: Lincoln (East St. Louis, Illinois)
- College: Notre Dame (1988–1992)
- NBA draft: 1992: 1st round, 5th overall pick
- Drafted by: Denver Nuggets
- Playing career: 1992–2003
- Position: Power forward / small forward
- Number: 20, 3

Career history
- 1992–1998: Denver Nuggets
- 1999–2000: Atlanta Hawks
- 2000–2001: Minnesota Timberwolves
- 2001–2003: Miami Heat

Career highlights
- NBA All-Rookie First Team (1993); First-team Parade All-American (1988); McDonald's All-American (1988)

Career NBA statistics
- Points: 7,410 (11.9 ppg)
- Rebounds: 4,032 (6.5 rpg)
- Assists: 981 (1.6 apg)
- Stats at NBA.com
- Stats at Basketball Reference

LaPhonso Darnell Ellis (born May 5, 1970) is an American former professional basketball player and college basketball analyst. He played for 11 years in the National Basketball Association after starring at Notre Dame. He worked as a broadcaster for ESPN from 2009 to 2023 and now works for the Big Ten Network and Fox and FS1.

== Early career ==
As a high school player, Ellis led East St. Louis Lincoln High School to Illinois Class AA boys' championships in 1987 and 1988. In the state title game in 1987, Ellis scored 27 points and grabbed 10 rebounds. In the 1988 title game, he scored 26 points, grabbed 15 rebounds, and blocked nine shots.

As a senior, in 1988, Ellis was named a Parade All-American and McDonald's High School All-American.

In 2007, Ellis was voted one of the "100 Legends of the IHSA Boys Basketball Tournament", recognizing his performance in the Illinois tournament.

== College career ==
Heavily recruited out of high school, Ellis chose to attend the University of Notre Dame. Digger Phelps was his head coach until replaced by John Macleod prior to Ellis's senior year.

During his four years in college, Notre Dame went 67–57. The team qualified for the NCAA tournament twice. As a senior captain, Ellis led the team in scoring (17.7 ppg), rebounding (11.7 rpg), field goal percentage (.631), and blocked shots (2.6 bpg). During that season, he led the team to the finals of the 1992 NIT Tournament.

Over the course of his college career, Ellis averaged 15.5 points per game (1,505 career points) and averaged 11.1 rebounds per game (1075 total). He set a school record with 200 career blocked shots, becoming the only Notre Dame player to ever lead the team in blocked shots four straight years.

Ellis graduated from Notre Dame on time with a degree in accounting.

== Professional career ==
Ellis was the fifth overall selection in the 1992 NBA draft, picked by the Denver Nuggets, In his rookie season, he averaged 14.7 points, 9.1 rebounds, and 1.4 blocks. He was also named to the 1992–93 All-Rookie first team. Ellis later on struggled with injuries, only playing six games in the 1994–95 season. Ellis had his best season in 1996–97, leading the Nuggets in scoring with 21.9 points per game.

After playing six years in Denver, Ellis signed as a free agent with the Atlanta Hawks. He spent two years with the Hawks before going to the Minnesota Timberwolves. In 2001, Ellis signed with the Miami Heat, where he retired after the 2003 season. He played professionally in the NBA from 1992 until 2003.

During his 11 seasons and 625 games in the NBA, Ellis averaged 11.9 points, 6.5 rebounds and 1.6 assists. His highest scoring season was 1996-97 when Ellis averaged 21.9 points. His best rebounding season was as a rookie when he averaged 9.1 rebounds per game.

== Career statistics ==
Legend
GP	Games played	GS	Games started	MPG	Minutes per game
FG%	Field goal percentage	3P%	3-point field goal percentage	FT%	Free throw percentage
RPG	Rebounds per game	APG	Assists per game	SPG	Steals per game
BPG	Blocks per game	PPG	Points per game	**Bold**	Career high

=== NBA ===
==== Regular season ====
Year	Team	GP	GS	MPG	FG%	3P%	FT%	RPG	APG	SPG	BPG	PPG
1992–93	Denver	**82**	**82**	33.5	**.504**	.154	.748	**9.1**	1.8	**.9**	**1.4**	14.7
1993–94	Denver	79	79	34.2	.502	.304	.674	8.6	2.1	.8	1.0	15.4
1994–95	Denver	6	0	9.7	.360	—	**1.000**	2.8	.7	.2	.8	4.0
1995–96	Denver	45	28	28.2	.438	.182	.601	7.2	1.6	.8	.7	10.5
1996–97	Denver	55	49	**36.4**	.439	**.367**	.773	7.0	2.4	.8	.7	**21.9**
1997–98	Denver	76	71	33.9	.407	.284	.805	7.2	**2.8**	**.9**	.6	14.3
1998–99	Atlanta	20	20	27.0	.421	.200	.705	5.5	.9	.4	.4	10.2
1999–2000	Atlanta	58	8	22.6	.450	.143	.695	5.0	1.0	.6	.4	8.4
2000–01	Minnesota	**82**	5	23.8	.464	.318	.790	6.0	1.1	.8	.9	9.4
2001–02	Miami	66	14	25.5	.418	.306	.631	4.3	.8	.5	.6	7.1
2002–03	Miami	55	3	14.3	.382	.252	.758	2.9	.3	.3	.3	5.0
Career		624	359	28.2	.452	.302	.730	6.5	1.6	.7	.8	11.9

==== Playoffs ====
Year	Team	GP	GS	MPG	FG%	3P%	FT%	RPG	APG	SPG	BPG	PPG
1994	Denver	**12**	**12**	**36.3**	**.479**	**.500**	.704	**8.1**	**2.2**	**.8**	**.9**	**14.8**
2001	Minnesota	4	0	19.3	.391	.000	**.750**	3.5	.0	.3	.8	6.0
Career		16	12	32.1	.467	.429	.710	6.9	1.6	.6	.9	12.6

== Broadcasting career ==
Ellis was a college basketball analyst for ESPN from 2009 until June 2023. He now works for the Big Ten Network and FOX/FS1.

Prior to ESPN, he served as a radio commentator for Notre Dame men's basketball.

== In popular culture ==
Ellis was mentioned multiple times on the Nickelodeon series The Secret World of Alex Mack. In the episode "Nerve" he was said to be star athlete of fictional Danielle Atron Junior High School under Coach Rooney (Glenn Morshower) and record-holder of his signature obstacle course. The school system's athletics field is named in his honor.
