= Mahmoud Abdul-Rauf =

American basketball player (born 1969)

- Abdul-Rauf with Kyoto Hannaryz in 2010

Personal information
- Born: March 9, 1969 (age 57) Gulfport, Mississippi, U.S.
- Listed height: 6 ft 1 in (1.85 m)
- Listed weight: 162 lb (73 kg)

Career information
- High school: Gulfport (Gulfport, Mississippi)
- College: LSU (1988–1990)
- NBA draft: 1990: 1st round, 3rd overall pick
- Drafted by: Denver Nuggets
- Playing career: 1990–2011
- Position: Point guard
- Number: 3, 1, 7

Career history
- 1990–1996: Denver Nuggets
- 1996–1998: Sacramento Kings
- 1998–1999: Fenerbahçe
- 2000–2001: Vancouver Grizzlies
- 2003–2004: Ural Great
- 2004–2005: Sedima Roseto
- 2006–2007: Aris BC
- 2007–2008: Al-Ittihad
- 2009–2011: Kyoto Hannaryz

Career highlights
- NBA All-Rookie Second Team (1991); NBA Most Improved Player (1993); Russian Cup champion (2004); 2× Consensus first-team All-American (1989, 1990); USBWA National Freshman of the Year (1989); 2× SEC Player of the Year (1989, 1990); 2× First-team All-SEC (1989, 1990); SEC All-Freshman Team (1989); No. 35 jersey retired by LSU Tigers; McDonald's All-American (1988); First-team Parade All-American (1988); Second-team Parade All-American (1987); 2× Mississippi Mr. Basketball (1987, 1988)

Career NBA statistics
- Points: 8,553 (14.6 ppg)
- Rebounds: 1,087 (1.9 rpg)
- Assists: 2,079 (3.5 apg)
- Stats at NBA.com
- Stats at Basketball Reference

Mahmoud Abdul-Rauf (born Christopher Wayne Jackson; March 9, 1969) is an American former professional basketball player. He played in the National Basketball Association (NBA) for nine years with the Denver Nuggets, Sacramento Kings and Vancouver Grizzlies.

Abdul-Rauf played college basketball for the LSU Tigers from 1988 to 1990 and was a consensus first-team All-American both seasons he played. He was chosen as the 3rd overall pick in the 1990 NBA draft by the Denver Nuggets. Abdul-Rauf was selected for the NBA Most Improved Player Award in 1993, appeared in the Slam Dunk Contest at the 1993 NBA All-Star Weekend, and was one of the league's most accurate free throw shooters. After his NBA career, he played in multiple leagues around the world.

During his early years with the Nuggets, Abdul-Rauf converted to Islam after being influenced by The Autobiography of Malcolm X and the Quran. He officially changed his name from Chris Jackson to Mahmoud Abdul-Rauf in 1993. He sparked widespread media attention and controversy during the 1995–96 NBA season, when he refused to stand for the U.S. national anthem in an act of protest, because he believed that the flag of the United States was a symbol of oppression. Abdul-Rauf later agreed to stand, but only if he was allowed to raise his hands in dua during the anthem as a condition. In 2016, Abdul-Rauf's national anthem protest received renewed attention in the wake of Colin Kaepernick and the 2016 NFL kneeling protests.

== Early life and career ==
Abdul-Rauf was born Christopher Wayne Jackson in Gulfport, Mississippi, the son of Jacqueline Jackson. He was raised in a single-parent family, along with his two brothers, Omar and David. His childhood was characterized by poverty, as there were times when he and his brothers were not able to have proper nutrition. Abdul-Rauf missed the fourth grade and was later placed in special education classes. He had a moderate form of Tourette syndrome, a condition that went undiagnosed until he was 17. Abdul-Rauf managed to overcome difficulties to become a basketball prodigy for Gulfport High School. In his senior season in high school he averaged 29.9 points and 5.7 assists per game and was called up to the McDonald's All-American Game. Abdul-Rauf was an excellent free throw shooter, in one practice making 283 free throws in a row, including a long streak of not hitting the rim, and delaying practice for 45 minutes. A few weeks later, he made 267 in a row in practice. He was also named Mississippi Mr. Basketball twice, in 1987 and 1988.

Having never played an organized game, Abdul-Rauf was discovered by a middle-school girls coach in Gulfport, Mississippi, during lunch period on the playground. Recognizing his skill, she convinced his mother to allow him to play organized basketball.

== College career ==
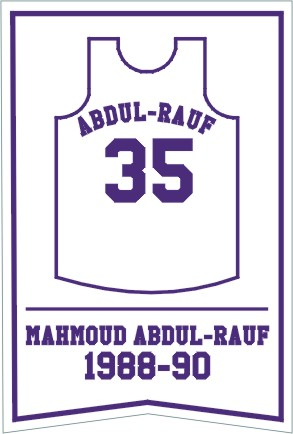
Abdul-Rauf's #35 was retired by LSU in 2020

Abdul-Rauf was a standout freshman for LSU, scoring 48 points against Louisiana Tech in just his third game for the school. He set the scoring record for a freshman, with 53 points against Florida. On March 4, 1989, he scored 55 points against Ole Miss to top his personal best, while also setting a career-high for three-pointers made, with 10. In the same game, Ole Miss' Gerald Glass scored 53, making their 108 combined points the most ever by two players in an SEC game He appeared in 32 games in his freshman season, setting the NCAA record for points by a freshman (965) and points per game by a freshman (30.2).

He was named SEC Player of the Year and First-team All-American. In his sophomore season, he produced similar numbers with his scoring average slightly falling to 27.8 per game. On February 10, 1990, he tied his career-high for three-pointers made, while finishing the game with 49 points. He was named SEC Player of the Year and First-team All-American for a second year in a row. After a remarkable two-year stint at LSU, Abdul-Rauf declared for the NBA draft.

His #35 jersey was retired by the Tigers in 2020.

== Professional career ==
Abdul-Rauf was selected with the third pick in the 1990 NBA draft by the Denver Nuggets. In his first season in the NBA he was named to the NBA All-Rookie Second Team. even though he never dunked in an actual game, he participated in the 1993 NBA Slam Dunk Contest, after Nuggets president and general manager Bernie Bickerstaff sent NBA league officials a tape of Abdul-Rauf showcasing his dunking ability. Abdul-Rauf led the league in free throw percentage in the 1993–94 and 1995–96 seasons. His free throw percentage of .956 in 1993–94 is the third highest seasonal percentage in NBA history, behind Calvin Murphy (.958, 1980–81) and José Calderón (.981, 2008–09). He played with Denver until 1996, and was a key player on that team, winning the NBA Most Improved Player Award in 1993. In November 1995 he scored 30 points and a career-high 20 assists against the Phoenix Suns. On December 8, 1995, Abdul-Rauf posted a career-high 51 points against the Utah Jazz. In June 1996, he was traded to the Sacramento Kings for Sarunas Marciulionis and a second-round pick.

In 1998, Abdul-Rauf signed a two-year, $3.4 million contract with Fenerbahçe of the Turkish Basketball League. He left the club without finishing the season, stating he would retire from basketball due to loss of interest in the game. After not playing for the entire 1999–00 season, he signed with the Vancouver Grizzlies in August 2000. In December 2003 Abdul-Rauf signed with Ural Great of the Russian Basketball Super League. In 2004, he signed with Italian Serie A club Sedima Roseto. Averaging 18.4 points and 2.2 assists per game in the 2004–05 season he signed a contract with Udine in July 2005, but he sat out the entire season due to a torn achilles tendon. For the 2006–07 season, he came out of retirement for the third time in his career to play for Aris Thessaloniki. In November 2007 he signed a contract with Al-Ittihad of the Saudi Basketball League. In August 2009 he signed with Basketball Japan League team Kyoto Hannaryz. He averaged 17.9 points in 38 games in his first season in Japan. In July 2010, he re-signed with Kyoto Hannaryz for the 2010–11 season.

He is currently playing in the BIG3 basketball league for the 3 Headed Monsters. In 2018 he placed 5th in 3-point field goal percentage hitting them at a 45.5% clip.

== NBA career statistics ==
Legend
GP	Games played	GS	Games started	MPG	Minutes per game
FG%	Field goal percentage	3P%	3-point field goal percentage	FT%	Free throw percentage
RPG	Rebounds per game	APG	Assists per game	SPG	Steals per game
BPG	Blocks per game	PPG	Points per game	**Bold**	Career high

*	Led the league

=== Regular season ===
Year	Team	GP	GS	MPG	FG%	3P%	FT%	RPG	APG	SPG	BPG	PPG
1990–91	Denver	67	19	22.5	.413	.240	.857	1.8	3.1	.8	**.1**	14.1
1991–92	Denver	**81**	11	19.0	.421	.330	.870	1.4	2.4	.5	.0	10.3
1992–93	Denver	**81**	**81**	33.5	.450	.355	.935	**2.8**	4.2	1.0	**.1**	**19.2**
1993–94	Denver	80	78	32.7	.460	.316	.956*	2.1	4.5	1.0	**.1**	18.0
1994–95	Denver	73	43	28.5	.470	.387	.885	1.9	3.6	**1.1**	**.1**	16.0
1995–96	Denver	57	53	**35.6**	.434	**.392**	.930*	2.4	**6.8**	**1.1**	**.1**	**19.2**
1996–97	Sacramento	75	51	28.4	.445	.382	.846	1.6	2.5	.7	**.1**	13.7
1997–98	Sacramento	31	0	17.1	.377	.161	**1.000**	1.2	1.9	.5	.0	7.3
2000–01	Vancouver	41	0	11.9	**.488**	.286	.759	.6	1.9	.2	.0	6.5
Career		586	336	26.7	.442	.354	.905	1.9	3.5	.8	.1	14.6

=== Playoffs ===
Year	Team	GP	GS	MPG	FG%	3P%	FT%	RPG	APG	SPG	BPG	PPG
1994	Denver	**12**	**12**	**28.3**	**.370**	**.324**	.935	1.5	**2.5**	.4	**.1**	12.9
1995	Denver	3	2	25.3	.364	.167	**1.000**	**1.7**	1.7	**.7**	.0	**13.3**
Career		15	14	27.7	.369	.286	.956	1.5	2.3	.1	.1	13.0

== Personal life ==
Abdul-Rauf was introduced to Islam when he was given the book The Autobiography of Malcolm X by his LSU coach, Dale Brown. He was introduced to the Quran during his rookie season with the Denver Nuggets and converted to Islam shortly afterward. He changed his name from Christopher Wayne Jackson to Mahmoud Abdul-Rauf in 1993. He is the father of five children.

Following his NBA career, Abdul-Rauf moved to Florida after his house in Necaise, Mississippi was burned to the ground in 2001. Investigators determined it was arson, and the FBI investigated, according to the Clarion-Ledger, but no one was ever charged.

In December 2001, Abdul-Rauf appeared on an episode of HBO's Real Sports where he stated that he thought the 9/11 terrorist attacks in the U.S. were an inside job and suggested that Israel might have been involved in the attacks.

== National anthem controversy ==
Abdul-Rauf is perhaps best known for the controversy created when he refused to stand for "The Star-Spangled Banner" before games, stating that the flag was a symbol of oppression and that the United States had a long history of tyranny. On March 12, 1996, the NBA suspended Abdul-Rauf for his refusal to stand, costing Abdul-Rauf $31,707 per missed game. Two days later, he worked out a compromise with the league, whereby he would stand during the playing of the national anthem but could close his eyes and look downward. He usually silently recited Islamic prayer during this time for those who are suffering from all walks of life and ethnic backgrounds.

In an apparent publicity stunt linked to this controversy, four employees of Denver's KBPI radio station were charged with misdemeanor offenses related to entering a Colorado mosque and playing "The Star-Spangled Banner" on a bugle and trumpet, in a response to Abdul-Rauf's refusal to stand for the national anthem.

== See also ==
- SEC Player of the year winners
- List of NBA season free throw percentage leaders
- List of converts to Islam
- List of American Muslims
