= 1993–94 NBA season =

48th NBA season

- League: National Basketball Association
- Sport: Basketball
- Duration: November 5, 1993 – April 24, 1994; April 28 – June 5, 1994 (Playoffs); June 8 – 22, 1994 (Finals)
- Teams: 27
- TV partner(s): NBC, TBS, TNT

Draft
- Top draft pick: Chris Webber
- Picked by: Orlando Magic (traded to Golden State Warriors for Penny Hardaway)

Regular season
- Top seed: Seattle SuperSonics
- Season MVP: Hakeem Olajuwon (Houston)
- Top scorer: David Robinson (San Antonio)

Playoffs
- Eastern champions: New York Knicks
- Eastern runners-up: Indiana Pacers
- Western champions: Houston Rockets
- Western runners-up: Utah Jazz

Finals
- Champions: Houston Rockets
- Runners-up: New York Knicks
- Finals MVP: Hakeem Olajuwon (Houston)

NBA seasons
- ← 1992–93 1994–95 →

The 1993–94 NBA season was the 48th season of the National Basketball Association (NBA). The season ended with the Houston Rockets defeating the New York Knicks 4 games to 3 in the NBA Finals to win the franchise's first championship.

== Notable occurrences ==
Coaching changes
Offseason
Team	1992–93 coach	1993–94 coach
Atlanta Hawks	Bob Weiss	Lenny Wilkens
Cleveland Cavaliers	Lenny Wilkens	Mike Fratello
Dallas Mavericks	Gar Heard	Quinn Buckner
Detroit Pistons	Ron Rothstein	Don Chaney
Indiana Pacers	Bob Hill	Larry Brown
Los Angeles Clippers	Larry Brown	Bob Weiss
Orlando Magic	Matt Guokas	Brian Hill
In-season
Team	Outgoing coach	Incoming coach
Los Angeles Lakers	Randy Pfund	Bill Bertka
Los Angeles Lakers	Bill Bertka	Magic Johnson

- The Orlando Magic became the first team to earn the top overall pick in consecutive years in the Lottery Era. Orlando drafted Chris Webber in the 1993 NBA draft, only to trade him to the Golden State Warriors for Penny Hardaway and three future first-round picks. Webber would win Rookie of the Year this season, while Hardaway was the runner-up.
- A press conference was held on October 6, 1993. One month before the start of the season, Michael Jordan shocked the world by announcing his retirement from the NBA following the death of his father. Jordan would not be back on the court until March 1995.
- The Chicago Bulls played their final season at Chicago Stadium.
- The Cleveland Cavaliers played their final season at Richfield Coliseum.
- The San Antonio Spurs played their first season at the Alamodome.
- The Atlanta Hawks traded All-Star forward Dominique Wilkins to the Los Angeles Clippers for Danny Manning midway through the season. As of 2020, the Hawks became the first and only #1 seed to trade their scoring leader during the regular season.
- The Dallas Mavericks almost became the first team to lose 70 or more games in consecutive seasons. They finished with a dreadful 13–69 record.
- Isiah Thomas of the Detroit Pistons suffered a torn Achilles tendon in a game against the Orlando Magic in April, which led to his retirement from the NBA. Just a few months prior, teammate Bill Laimbeer announced his retirement, citing a lack of desire to play. Their retirements came a season before Grant Hill's arrival the next season.
- Dennis Rodman, another star player from Detroit's Bad Boys era, was traded to the San Antonio Spurs for Sean Elliott, and began to sport his trademark colored hair. However, Elliott was eventually traded back to the Spurs the next season, where he'd play the rest of his career.
- Laker legend Magic Johnson tried his hand at coaching, but the Lakers missed the playoffs for just the fourth time in NBA history (and the first time since 1976) and Johnson refused to come back for the 1994–95 season; both L.A. based teams post a collective mark combo of 60–104, marking the first time both the Lakers and Clippers missed the playoffs together since the latter team's arrival in Los Angeles in 1984.
- The Houston Rockets tied a record set in 1948 by the Washington Capitols in starting the season with 15 victories; they started the season 22–1 before finishing with a 58–24 record.
- On February 17, David Robinson of the San Antonio Spurs recorded the NBA's 4th quadruple-double (34 points, 10 each rebounds, assists, and blocks) in a home game against the Detroit Pistons. This is the last time a quadruple-double was made in an NBA game.
- The 1994 NBA All-Star Game was played at the Target Center in Minneapolis, Minnesota, with the East defeating the West 127–118. Scottie Pippen of the Chicago Bulls took home the game's MVP honors.
- On the season's final day, Spurs center David Robinson scored 71 points against the Los Angeles Clippers to capture the scoring title.
- In the wake of the Northridge earthquake, the game between Sacramento Kings and Los Angeles Lakers was postponed and rescheduled.
- Reggie Miller of the Indiana Pacers became just the third member of the 50–40–90 Club by shooting 50% from the field, 42% from three, and 91% from the line for the course of the entire season. Only Larry Bird and Mark Price had achieved this feat at that time; only Steve Nash, Dirk Nowitzki, Kevin Durant, Stephen Curry, Malcolm Brogdon, and Kyrie Irving have achieved it since.
- The Denver Nuggets made NBA Playoff history by becoming the first eight-seed to defeat a one-seed in the first round of a playoff series when they defeated the Seattle SuperSonics 3 games to 2.
- The Indiana Pacers won their first NBA playoff series by sweeping the Orlando Magic, who were making their playoff debut. The Pacers would go on to their first Eastern Conference Finals, eventually losing to the New York Knicks in seven games.
- The New York Knicks came one game away from playing the maximum number of playoff contests. Had the New Jersey Nets captured one more victory over them in the first round, this would have been done as the Knicks played seven-game series in the next three rounds against the Bulls, Pacers, and Rockets. The Boston Celtics would later exceed the mark in 2008.
- This year's NBA Finals would be the last to go seven games until 2005. This was also the only year in which both the NBA Finals and the Stanley Cup Finals would go to seven games and involve teams from the same city. Although the Knicks lost the NBA Finals, the Rangers (their NHL counterparts) won their first Stanley Cup since 1940.
- Neither the Los Angeles Lakers nor the Boston Celtics made the playoffs, making this the only season in NBA history until 2014 that neither of these teams had qualified.

== 1993–94 NBA changes ==
- The Denver Nuggets changed their logo and uniforms, scrapping the rainbow skyline along with changing the color scheme to navy, red, and gold.
- The Milwaukee Bucks changed their logo and uniforms, adopting a new color scheme of purple to go with dark green, while their uniforms featured taller B's and S's on the home and road jerseys.
- The San Antonio Spurs moved into the Alamodome.

== NBA awards ==
=== Yearly awards ===
- NBA Most Valuable Player: Hakeem Olajuwon, Houston Rockets
- NBA Rookie of the Year: Chris Webber, Golden State Warriors
- NBA Defensive Player of the Year: Hakeem Olajuwon, Houston Rockets
- Sixth Man of the Year: Dell Curry, Charlotte Hornets
- NBA Most Improved Player: Don MacLean, Washington Bullets
- NBA Coach of the Year: Lenny Wilkens, Atlanta Hawks

- All-NBA First Team:
  - F – Karl Malone, Utah Jazz
  - F – Scottie Pippen, Chicago Bulls
  - C – Hakeem Olajuwon, Houston Rockets
  - G – John Stockton, Utah Jazz
  - G – Latrell Sprewell, Golden State Warriors
- All-NBA Second Team:
  - F – Charles Barkley, Phoenix Suns
  - F – Shawn Kemp, Seattle SuperSonics
  - C – David Robinson, San Antonio Spurs
  - G – Kevin Johnson, Phoenix Suns
  - G – Mitch Richmond, Sacramento Kings
- All-NBA Third Team:
  - F – Derrick Coleman, New Jersey Nets
  - F – Dominique Wilkins, Atlanta Hawks, Los Angeles Clippers
  - C – Shaquille O'Neal, Orlando Magic
  - G – Mark Price, Cleveland Cavaliers
  - G – Gary Payton, Seattle SuperSonics

- NBA All-Defensive First Team:
  - F – Charles Oakley, New York Knicks
  - F – Scottie Pippen, Chicago Bulls
  - C – Hakeem Olajuwon, Houston Rockets
  - G – Mookie Blaylock, Atlanta Hawks
  - G – Gary Payton, Seattle SuperSonics
- NBA All-Defensive Second Team:
  - F – Horace Grant, Orlando Magic
  - F – Dennis Rodman, San Antonio Spurs
  - C – David Robinson, San Antonio Spurs
  - G – Latrell Sprewell, Golden State Warriors
  - G – Nate McMillan, Seattle SuperSonics

- NBA All-Rookie First Team:
  - Vin Baker, Milwaukee Bucks
  - Penny Hardaway, Orlando Magic
  - Jamal Mashburn, Dallas Mavericks
  - Isaiah Rider, Minnesota Timberwolves
  - Chris Webber, Golden State Warriors
- All-NBA Rookie Second Team:
  - Shawn Bradley, Philadelphia 76ers
  - Lindsey Hunter, Detroit Pistons
  - Toni Kukoč, Chicago Bulls
  - Dino Radja, Boston Celtics
  - Nick Van Exel, Los Angeles Lakers

== Standings ==
=== By division ===
Atlantic Division	W	L	PCT	GB	Home	Road	Div
y-New York Knicks	57	25	.695	—	32–9	25–16	18–10
x-Orlando Magic	50	32	.610	7	31–10	19–22	20–8
x-New Jersey Nets	45	37	.549	12	29–12	16–25	17–11
x-Miami Heat	42	40	.512	15	22–19	20–21	16–12
Boston Celtics	32	50	.390	25	18–23	14–27	12–16
Philadelphia 76ers	25	57	.305	32	15–26	10–31	7–21
Washington Bullets	24	58	.293	33	17–24	7–34	8–20

Central Division	W	L	PCT	GB	Home	Road	Div
y-Atlanta Hawks	57	25	.695	–	36–5	21–20	21–7
x-Chicago Bulls	55	27	.671	2	31–10	24–17	21–7
x-Indiana Pacers	47	35	.573	10	29–12	18–23	15–13
x-Cleveland Cavaliers	47	35	.573	10	31–10	16–25	16–12
Charlotte Hornets	41	41	.500	16	28–13	13–28	12–16
Detroit Pistons	20	62	.244	37	10–31	10–31	4–24
Milwaukee Bucks	20	62	.244	37	11–30	9–32	9–19

Midwest Division	W	L	PCT	GB	Home	Road	Div
y-Houston Rockets	58	24	.707	—	35–6	23–18	15–11
x-San Antonio Spurs	55	27	.671	3	32–9	23–18	16–10
x-Utah Jazz	53	29	.646	5	33–8	20–21	21–5
x-Denver Nuggets	42	40	.512	16	28–13	14–27	14–12
Minnesota Timberwolves	20	62	.244	38	13–28	7–34	5–21
Dallas Mavericks	13	69	.159	45	6–35	7–34	7–19

Pacific Division	W	L	PCT	GB	Home	Road	Div
y-Seattle SuperSonics	63	19	.768	—	37–4	26–15	25–5
x-Phoenix Suns	56	26	.683	7	36–5	20–21	19–11
x-Golden State Warriors	50	32	.610	13	29–12	21–20	19–11
x-Portland Trail Blazers	47	35	.573	16	30–11	17–24	17–13
Los Angeles Lakers	33	49	.402	30	21–20	12–29	7–23
Sacramento Kings	28	54	.341	35	20–21	8–33	9–21
Los Angeles Clippers	27	55	.329	36	17–24	10–31	9–21

=== By conference ===
#	Eastern Conference				
#	Team	W	L	PCT	GB
1	c-Atlanta Hawks	57	25	.695	–
2	y-New York Knicks	57	25	.695	–
3	x-Chicago Bulls	55	27	.671	2
4	x-Orlando Magic	50	32	.610	7
5	x-Indiana Pacers	47	35	.573	10
6	x-Cleveland Cavaliers	47	35	.573	10
7	x-New Jersey Nets	45	37	.549	12
8	x-Miami Heat	42	40	.512	15
9	Charlotte Hornets	41	41	.500	16
10	Boston Celtics	32	50	.390	25
11	Philadelphia 76ers	25	57	.305	32
12	Washington Bullets	24	58	.293	33
13	Milwaukee Bucks	20	62	.244	37
14	Detroit Pistons	20	62	.244	37

#	Western Conference				
#	Team	W	L	PCT	GB
1	z-Seattle SuperSonics	63	19	.768	–
2	y-Houston Rockets	58	24	.707	5
3	x-Phoenix Suns	56	26	.683	7
4	x-San Antonio Spurs	55	27	.671	8
5	x-Utah Jazz	53	29	.646	10
6	x-Golden State Warriors	50	32	.610	13
7	x-Portland Trail Blazers	47	35	.573	16
8	x-Denver Nuggets	42	40	.512	21
9	Los Angeles Lakers	33	49	.402	30
10	Sacramento Kings	28	54	.341	35
11	Los Angeles Clippers	27	55	.329	36
12	Minnesota Timberwolves	20	62	.244	43
13	Dallas Mavericks	13	69	.159	50

Notes

- z – Clinched home court advantage for the entire playoffs
- c – Clinched home court advantage for the conference playoffs
- y – Clinched division title
- x – Clinched playoff spot

== Playoffs ==
Teams in bold advanced to the next round. The numbers to the left of each team indicate the team's seeding in its conference, and the numbers to the right indicate the number of games the team won in that round. The division champions are marked by an asterisk. Home court advantage does not necessarily belong to the higher-seeded team, but instead the team with the better regular season record; teams enjoying the home advantage are shown in italics.

First round
**E1**	**Atlanta***	**3**
E8	Miami	2
E4	Orlando	0
**E5**	**Indiana**	**3**
**E3**	**Chicago**	**3**
E6	Cleveland	0
**E2**	**New York***	**3**
E7	New Jersey	1
W1	Seattle*	2
**W8**	**Denver**	**3**
W4	San Antonio	1
**W5**	**Utah**	**3**
**W3**	**Phoenix**	**3**
W6	Golden State	0
**W2**	**Houston***	**3**
W7	Portland	1

Quarter-finals
E1	Atlanta*	2
**E5**	**Indiana**	**4**
E3	Chicago	3
**E2**	**New York***	**4**
W8	Denver	3
**W5**	**Utah**	**4**
W3	Phoenix	3
**W2**	**Houston***	**4**

Semi-finals
E5	Indiana	3
**E2**	**New York***	**4**
W5	Utah	1
**W2**	**Houston***	**4**

Final
E2	New York*	3
**W2**	**Houston***	**4**

- * Division winner
- **Bold** Series winner
- Italic Team with home-court advantage

== Statistics leaders ==
Category	Player	Team	Stat
Points per game	David Robinson	San Antonio Spurs	29.8
Rebounds per game	Dennis Rodman	San Antonio Spurs	17.3
Assists per game	John Stockton	Utah Jazz	12.6
Steals per game	Nate McMillan	Seattle SuperSonics	2.96
Blocks per game	Dikembe Mutombo	Denver Nuggets	4.10
FG%	Shaquille O'Neal	Orlando Magic	.599
FT%	Mahmoud Abdul-Rauf	Denver Nuggets	.956
3FG%	Tracy Murray	Portland Trail Blazers	.459

== See also ==
- List of NBA regular season records
