= List of NBA mascots =

National Basketball Association (NBA) team mascots are as follows. Two mascots, Go the Gorilla and Rocky the Mountain Lion were ranked fourth and ninth respectively on AskMen.com's top 10 sports mascots. As of now, four teams do not have a mascot, namely the Los Angeles Lakers, Brooklyn Nets, New York Knicks, and Golden State Warriors.

== Current mascots ==
Team	Mascot(s)	Photo
Atlanta Hawks	Harry the Hawk	
Boston Celtics	Lucky the Leprechaun	
Charlotte Hornets	Hugo the Hornet, Super Hugo	
Chicago Bulls	Benny the Bull, Mini Benny, Big Ben, Benji, Mama Betty, Inflatabulls	
Cleveland Cavaliers	Moondog and Sir CC	
Dallas Mavericks	Champ and Mavs Man	
Denver Nuggets	Rocky the Mountain Lion	
Detroit Pistons	Hooper, Mini Hooper	
Houston Rockets	Clutch the Bear; Mini Clutch	
Indiana Pacers	Boomer; Mini Boomer	
Los Angeles Clippers	Chuck the Condor	
Memphis Grizzlies	Grizz	
Miami Heat	Burnie	
Milwaukee Bucks	Bango (the Buck); Bango Jr.	
Minnesota Timberwolves	Crunch the Wolf	
New Orleans Pelicans	Pierre the Pelican	
Oklahoma City Thunder	Rumble the Bison	
Orlando Magic	Stuff the Magic Dragon	
Philadelphia 76ers	Franklin the Dog	
Phoenix Suns	The Gorilla	
Portland Trail Blazers	Blaze the Trail Cat; Douglas Fur	
Sacramento Kings	Slamson the Lion	
San Antonio Spurs	The Coyote	
Toronto Raptors	The Raptor	
Utah Jazz	Jazz Bear; Lil Bear	
Washington Wizards	G-Wiz, G-Man	

== Former mascots ==
Team	Mascot(s)	Photo
Atlanta Hawks	Skyhawk	
Brooklyn Nets	BrooklyKnight	
Charlotte Bobcats	Rufus D. Lynx	
Chicago Bulls	Da Bull	
Cleveland Cavaliers	Whammer, The Wizard	
Denver Nuggets	Maxie Miner	
Detroit Pistons	Cocky Rocky, Sir Slam A Lot	
Houston Rockets	Booster, Turbo	
Golden State Warriors	Thunder, Berserker	
Indiana Pacers	Hoop T Dunker; Bowser – Boomer's counterpart, Pete M. Panther	
Los Angeles Clippers	Sam Dunk	
New Jersey Nets	Duncan the Dragon; SuperDunk; Sly the Silver Fox; Mini Sly	
New Orleans Hornets	Hugo (Current mascot of the Charlotte Hornets)	
New Orleans Pelicans	King Cake Baby	
Philadelphia 76ers	Hip Hop (Note: Replaced by new owners following the 2012 season.); Lil Hip Hop; Big Shot (Note: Retired when the 76ers departed the Spectrum following the 1996 season.); Hoops	
Portland Trail Blazers	Sparky; Bigfoot	
Sacramento Kings	The Gorilla; Roy Al	
Seattle SuperSonics	Squatch, The Wheedle	
Toronto Raptors	Stripes	
Washington Bullets	Hoops	

== Mascot of the Year ==
In 1997, the mascots started having an annual meeting at the NBA Mascot Conference. Since 2005, the conference also selects an individual to be honored as the top professional in the league, the Mascot of the Year.

Year	Mascot	Team
2005	Clutch	Houston Rockets
2006	Jazz Bear	Utah Jazz
2007	Hugo the Hornet	New Orleans Hornets
2008	Jazz Bear (2)	Utah Jazz
2009	Rumble the Bison	Oklahoma City Thunder
2010	Bango	Milwaukee Bucks
2011	Grizz	Memphis Grizzlies
2012	Crunch the Wolf	Minnesota Timberwolves
2013	Clutch (2)	Houston Rockets
2014	The Coyote	San Antonio Spurs
2015	Benny the Bull	Chicago Bulls
2016	Stuff the Magic Dragon	Orlando Magic
2017	Stuff the Magic Dragon (2)	Orlando Magic
2018	Jazz Bear (3)	Utah Jazz
2019	Rocky the Mountain Lion	Denver Nuggets
2020	The Coyote (2)	San Antonio Spurs
2021	Clutch (3)	Houston Rockets
2022	Chuck the Condor	Los Angeles Clippers
2023	Harry the Hawk	Atlanta Hawks
2024	The Gorilla	Phoenix Suns
2025	The Gorilla (2)	Phoenix Suns
2026	Stuff the Magic Dragon (3)	Orlando Magic

== See also ==
- List of mascots
