= Skyhawk =

Skyhawk may refer to:

== Aircraft and military ==
- Cessna 172 Skyhawk, a single-engine, four-seat light airplane
- Douglas A-4 Skyhawk, a ground-attack jet aircraft
- Seibel S-4, a helicopter evaluated by the United States Army under the designation YH-24 Sky Hawk
- SkyHawks Parachute Team, the Canadian Forces parachute demonstration team
- Sky Hawk, an Iranian experimental air-to-air version of the MIM-23 Hawk air defense missile

== Automobiles ==
- Buick Skyhawk, a compact car built from 1975 to 1989
- Studebaker Sky Hawk, a 1956 two-door coupe automobile

== Sports ==
- Skyhawk (mascot), a mascot for the Atlanta Hawks professional basketball team
- Tennessee–Martin Skyhawks, an athletic program of The University of Tennessee at Martin
- North Bay Skyhawks, a junior hockey team in Canada
- Skyhawk, the mascot of Stonehill College, a college in Easton, MA

== Other uses ==
- Skyhawk (Cedar Point), a flat ride at Cedar Point amusement park in Sandusky, Ohio, US
- Skyhawk (comics), a Marvel Comics character
- Skyhawks (TV series), an animated cartoon television series sponsored by Mattel Toys
- Sky Hawk (manga), a Japanese manga series
- The Sky Hawk, a 1929 film
- A neighborhood in Santa Rosa, California

== See also ==
- Captain Skyhawk, a video game developed by Rare for the NES
- Cessna CH-1 Skyhook, based on the Seibel S-4B
