= Clutch City =

Nickname for the City of Houston, Texas

Clutch City is a nickname given to the city of Houston, Texas after the city's National Basketball Association (NBA) club, the Houston Rockets.

== Background ==
"Choke City" was a Houston Chronicle front-page headline in 1994, given to the city of Houston after the Houston Rockets blew two consecutive commanding fourth-quarter leads at The Summit in the first two games of their Western Conference semifinals match-up versus the Phoenix Suns in the 1994 NBA Playoffs. This in effect took the series to Phoenix, Arizona down 0–2 in the best-of-seven series. It was feared at the time that the Rockets would follow the same fate as the city's National Football League (NFL) club at the time, the Houston Oilers; the Oilers blew a 32-point lead during a January 3, 1993 NFL playoff game versus the Buffalo Bills; the Bills won the game 41–38 in overtime. The following year, the Oilers took an 11-game winning streak into the postseason. After a first-round bye, they drew the Kansas City Chiefs at home. After leading for much of the game, the Oilers would ultimately squander a 10-point lead at home to Joe Montana and the Chiefs, leading to a 28–20 upset. The Houston Astros had similar playoff heartbreaks: in the decisive Game 5 of the 1980 National League Championship Series, the Astros had a 5–2 lead going into the 8th inning over the Philadelphia Phillies at the Astrodome, six outs away from making their first World Series. The Phillies however would score 5 runs in the 8th and win 8–7 in extra innings. In the Game 6 of the 1986 National League Championship Series against the New York Mets, the Mets held a 3–2 series lead while the Astros looked to send it to a Game 7 with Cy Young pitcher Mike Scott waiting in the wings. Houston led by three for most of the game, until New York scored three runs of their own to tie it in the top of the 9th and sent the game to extra innings, eventually prevailing 7–6 in 16 innings at the Astrodome. During this era, no Houston-based professional sports team from an existing sports league (the NFL, NBA, or Major League Baseball) had won a championship.

== 1993–1994 season ==
In Rudy Tomjanovich's second full season as head coach, the Rockets began the 1993–94 season by tying an NBA record with start of 15–0. Led by Hakeem Olajuwon, who was named the MVP and Defensive Player of the Year, the Rockets won a franchise-record 58 games. The Rockets in the second round of the playoffs recovered from losing the first two games at home to the Phoenix Suns in the second round of the playoffs after blowing multiple big leads in the first two games, eventually winning in seven games to advance to the NBA Finals. This series is widely regarded as the birth of the term nickname "Clutch City". Houston once again went down by three games to two to the New York Knicks, but managed to win the last two games on their home court, and claim their first championship in franchise history, of which at the end of Game 6 Olajuwon blocked a championship-winning 3-point shot attempt by John Starks, forcing a Game 7. Olajuwon was awarded the Finals MVP, after averaging 27 points, nine rebounds and four blocked shots per game.

== 1994–1995 season ==
"Don't ever underestimate the heart of a champion!"

— Rockets head coach Rudy Tomjanovich during the 1995 NBA championship trophy ceremony after the game. The Rockets were just the fifth franchise to repeat as champion at the time.

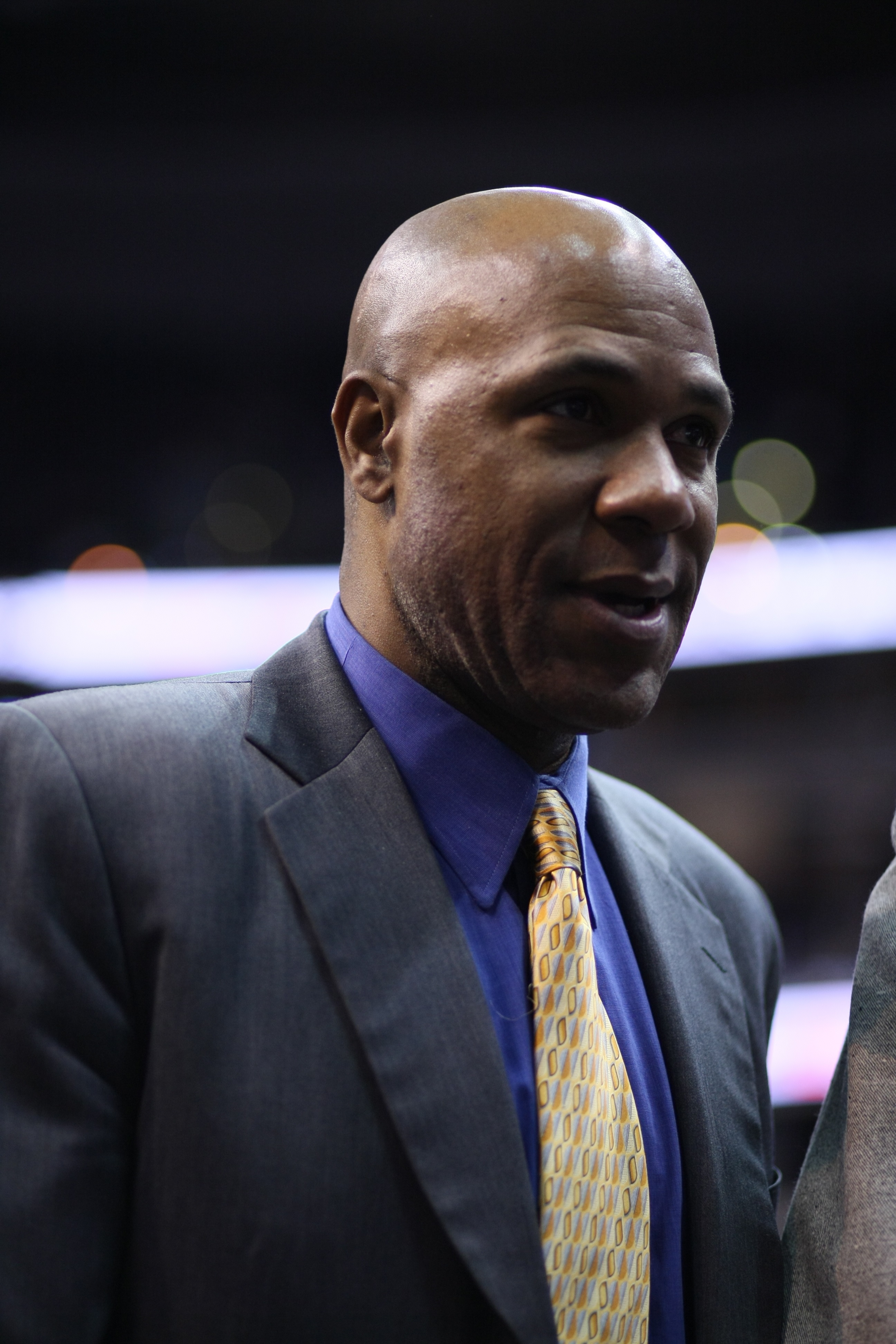
Mario Elie hit the game-winning shot in the 1995 WCSF against the Suns, which came to be known as the "Kiss of Death" shot.

The Rockets initially struggled in the first half of the 1994–95 season, and ended up winning only 47 games, which was 11 games lower than their previous year's total. In a midseason trade with Portland, the Rockets obtained guard Clyde Drexler, a former teammate of Olajuwon at the University of Houston, in exchange for Otis Thorpe. Houston entered the playoffs as the sixth seed in the Western Conference, but managed to defeat the 60–22 Utah Jazz in the first round, winning the last two games after being down 2-1 including the decisive Game 5 road win. They fell behind 3–1 to the 59–23 Phoenix Suns in the second round, but won three straight to win the series, and became only the first team in NBA history to overcome both a 2–0 and a 3–1 series deficit in a seven-game series during the same postseason. In Game 7, Mario Elie hit the game-winning three-pointer to break a tie with 7.1 seconds. The shot is called the "Kiss of Death" by Rockets fans, as Elie made a taunting kissing gesture towards the Suns' bench after it went in. The Rockets then beat the 62-20 San Antonio Spurs in the conference finals, to reach the Finals against the Orlando Magic, led by Shaquille O'Neal and Anfernee "Penny" Hardaway. When Houston swept the series in four straight games, they became the first team in NBA history to win the championship as a sixth seed, and the first to beat four 50-win teams in a single postseason en route to the championship. Olajuwon, who had averaged 35.3 points and 12.5 rebounds against the Spurs and regular-season MVP David Robinson in the conference finals, was named the Finals MVP, becoming only the second player after Michael Jordan to win the award two years consecutively. Shaquille O'Neal (00–02), Kobe Bryant (09–10), LeBron James (12–13) and Kevin Durant (17–18) have since accomplished this.

== Usage in other Houston sports ==
The name Clutch City would be used by the city's Major League Baseball (MLB) club (the Houston Astros) after their first World Series appearance in 2005, and by the city's Major League Soccer (MLS) club (the Houston Dynamo) after they won the MLS Cup in their inaugural season in 2006. The name Clutch City was also associated with the Houston Aeros and their triumphant march to the Calder Cup Finals – the biggest stage in AHL hockey.

One variation of the name was Crush City, which was used in 2015 to support the Astros in their playoff run.

The Houston Rockets used the brand name Clutch Gaming for their League of Legends Championship Series team.

NFL on CBS announcer Ian Eagle also referenced the nickname, after the Houston Texans defeated the Buffalo Bills during the 2024 season by a game-winning 59-yard field goal by kicker Kaʻimi Fairbairn.

== See also ==
- Nicknames of Houston
- List of city nicknames in Texas
- Culture of Houston
- Clutch, the mascot of the Houston Rockets, unveiled after their 1994 NBA Championship.
