= 1994 NBA Finals =

1994 basketball championship series

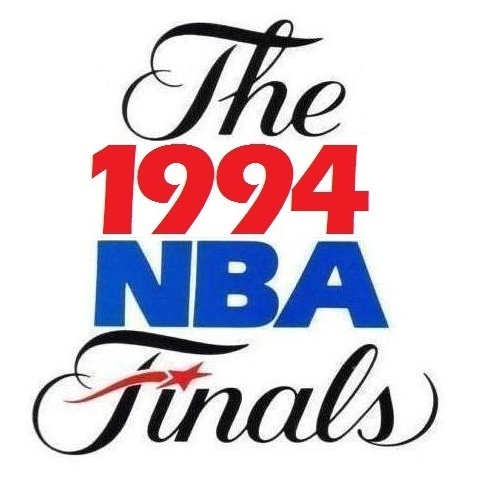
Team	Coach	Wins
Houston Rockets	Rudy Tomjanovich	4
New York Knicks	Pat Riley	3
- Dates: June 8–22
- MVP: Hakeem Olajuwon (Houston Rockets)
- Hall of Famers: Rockets: Hakeem Olajuwon (2008); Knicks: Patrick Ewing (2008); Coaches: Pat Riley (2008); Rudy Tomjanovich (2020); Officials: Dick Bavetta (2015); Hugh Evans (2022); Darell Garretson (2016)
- Eastern finals: Knicks defeated Pacers, 4–3
- Western finals: Rockets defeated Jazz, 4–1

The 1994 NBA Finals was the championship series of the National Basketball Association's (NBA) 1993–94 season, and the culmination of the season's playoffs. The Western Conference champion Houston Rockets played the Eastern Conference champion New York Knicks for the championship, with the Rockets holding home court advantage in the best of seven series. The Rockets defeated the Knicks in seven games to win the team's first NBA championship. This was the first major professional sports championship ever won by a Houston-based team.

This matchup was Hakeem Olajuwon's second NBA Finals appearance, his other being in 1986, when Larry Bird and the Boston Celtics defeated the Rockets, four games to two. The series was Patrick Ewing's first NBA Finals appearance. The Rockets came in with strong determination to win not only the franchise's first NBA championship, but the city's first championship in a league that still existed. The Knicks, who had been recently acquired by Viacom when it bought Paramount Communications (formerly Gulf+Western), were looking to win their third NBA championship and first since 1973.

The series was hailed as a meeting of the two great centers who had previously played for a championship in college. In 1984, while Olajuwon was with the University of Houston and Ewing was with Georgetown University, Georgetown beat Houston 84–75 in the 1984 NCAA Championship game. But in this series, Olajuwon outperformed Ewing, outscoring him in every game of the series and posting numbers of 26.9 ppg on 50.0% shooting compared to Ewing's 18.9 ppg on 36.3% shooting. However, Ewing set an NBA finals record in the series with a total of 30 blocks, and tied the single-game record of 8 blocks in Game 5. Tim Duncan later set the record for most blocks in a Finals series (2003) with 32 blocks in six games, while Dwight Howard set the record for most blocked shots in a Finals game with 9 blocked shots in Game 4 of the 2009 Finals with the Orlando Magic.

During the series, the Rockets played seven low-scoring, defensive games against the Knicks. After splitting the first two games in Houston, the Knicks won two out of three games at Madison Square Garden, which also hosted the Stanley Cup Final where the New York Rangers won their first Stanley Cup in 54 years.

In Game 6, Olajuwon blocked a last-second three-point shot attempt by John Starks that would have given the Knicks their third NBA title, instead giving the Rockets an 86–84 victory and forcing a Game 7, which made Knicks Coach Pat Riley the first (and to this date, the only) coach in a Game 7 NBA Finals on two teams, having been with the Los Angeles Lakers in 1984 and 1988. In addition, the Knicks set a record for most playoff games played in one season, with 25. The Detroit Pistons tied this record in 2005. The Boston Celtics, coached by 1994 Knicks guard Doc Rivers, surpassed it during their 2008 championship season when they played 26.

The Rockets beat the Knicks in Game 7, 90–84, enabling the city of Houston to not only celebrate its first NBA and fifth professional sports championship (first in an existing league), but also deny New York from having both NBA and NHL championships in the same year (Chicago had suffered this fate two years earlier in 1992, with the Bulls winning their second NBA championship and the Blackhawks losing in the Stanley Cup Final). For his efforts, Olajuwon was named NBA Finals Most Valuable Player (MVP). For the Knicks, Riley had the unfortunate distinction of becoming the first (and to date, the only) coach to lose a Game 7 NBA Finals on two teams, having lost to the Celtics in 1984. It also denied him the distinction of being the first coach to win a Game 7 NBA Finals with two teams, having defeated the Detroit Pistons in 1988.

It was the first championship series since 1990 without the Chicago Bulls.

NBC Sports used Ahmad Rashad (Knicks sideline) and Hannah Storm (Rockets sideline). Marv Albert and Matt Guokas called the action.

Hal Douglas narrated the season ending documentary Clutch City for NBA Entertainment.

== Background ==
=== Houston Rockets ===
The Rockets chose Hakeem Olajuwon as the first overall pick in the 1984 NBA draft. Olajuwon's first nine NBA seasons included numerous All-Star, All-NBA and All-Defensive selections, but the closest he got to a championship was in 1986, when the Rockets fell two games short of a title against a powerful Boston Celtics team.

By his tenth season, Olajuwon became a more complete player, and he led the Rockets to a 15–0 start en route to a 58–24 record. But after a four-game defeat of the Portland Trail Blazers in the first round, they blew a pair of big fourth-quarter leads at home and lost to the Phoenix Suns to begin the second round (in the process earning the derisive nickname "Choke City" from the Houston Chronicle).

In response, the Rockets used the headline as motivation, overcoming a 0–2 deficit to defeat the Suns in seven games (earning the nickname '"Clutch City"). In the conference finals, Houston defeated the Utah Jazz in five games to claim their third conference title. Olajuwon won the MVP and Defensive Player of the Year awards at season's end.

=== New York Knicks ===
Like Olajuwon, Patrick Ewing was a first overall pick of the NBA draft. Ewing was picked by the Knicks in the 1985 draft, and won Rookie of the Year that season. But despite earning All-Star accolades of his own, the Knicks teams he played with only made it past the first round twice during his first six seasons (in 1989 and 1990).

In the 1991 offseason, the Knicks hired Pat Riley as head coach. In contrast to the fast paced style of Showtime he used with the Los Angeles Lakers, Riley took a more deliberate and physical approach in New York. Aided by the likes of Charles Oakley, Anthony Mason, John Starks and Charles Smith, Ewing and the Knicks rose to prominence under Riley, and in 1994, they won 57 games to finish second in the Eastern Conference.

Their playoff run began with a 3–1 victory over their cross-river rival New Jersey Nets. They had a hard time disposing of a Chicago Bulls team that had lost Michael Jordan to retirement (which lasted until the final months of the following season), but managed to win all four home games to advance. In the conference finals, they were pitted against the upstart Indiana Pacers, led by Reggie Miller. The Pacers gave the Knicks a scare, but the latter's experience proved too much as they won the series in seven games.

=== Road to the Finals ===
Houston Rockets (Western Conference champion)		New York Knicks (Eastern Conference champion)
# / Western Conference; # / Team / W / L / PCT / GB; 1 / z-Seattle SuperSonics / 63 / 19 / .768 / –; 2 / y-Houston Rockets / 58 / 24 / .707 / 5; 3 / x-Phoenix Suns / 56 / 26 / .683 / 7; 4 / x-San Antonio Spurs / 55 / 27 / .671 / 8; 5 / x-Utah Jazz / 53 / 29 / .646 / 10; 6 / x-Golden State Warriors / 50 / 32 / .610 / 13; 7 / x-Portland Trail Blazers / 47 / 35 / .573 / 16; 8 / x-Denver Nuggets / 42 / 40 / .512 / 21; 9 / Los Angeles Lakers / 33 / 49 / .402 / 30; 10 / Sacramento Kings / 28 / 54 / .341 / 35; 11 / Los Angeles Clippers / 27 / 55 / .329 / 36; 12 / Minnesota Timberwolves / 20 / 62 / .244 / 43; 13 / Dallas Mavericks / 13 / 69 / .159 / 50; 2nd seed in the West, 2nd best league record	Regular season	# / Eastern Conference; # / Team / W / L / PCT / GB; 1 / c-Atlanta Hawks / 57 / 25 / .695 / –; 2 / y-New York Knicks / 57 / 25 / .695 / –; 3 / x-Chicago Bulls / 55 / 27 / .671 / 2; 4 / x-Orlando Magic / 50 / 32 / .610 / 7; 5 / x-Indiana Pacers / 47 / 35 / .573 / 10; 6 / x-Cleveland Cavaliers / 47 / 35 / .573 / 10; 7 / x-New Jersey Nets / 45 / 37 / .549 / 12; 8 / x-Miami Heat / 42 / 40 / .512 / 15; 9 / Charlotte Hornets / 41 / 41 / .500 / 16; 10 / Boston Celtics / 32 / 50 / .390 / 25; 11 / Philadelphia 76ers / 25 / 57 / .305 / 32; 12 / Washington Bullets / 24 / 58 / .293 / 33; 13 / Milwaukee Bucks / 20 / 62 / .244 / 37; 14 / Detroit Pistons / 20 / 62 / .244 / 37; 2nd seed in the East, 4th best league record
Defeated the (7) Portland Trail Blazers, 3–1	First round	Defeated the (7) New Jersey Nets, 3–1
Defeated the (3) Phoenix Suns, 4–3	Conference semifinals	Defeated the (3) Chicago Bulls, 4–3
Defeated the (5) Utah Jazz, 4–1	Conference finals	Defeated the (5) Indiana Pacers, 4–3

=== Regular season series ===
The Houston Rockets won both games in the regular season series:

December 2, 1993

Houston Rockets 94, New York Knicks 85

Madison Square Garden, New York City

February 24, 1994

New York Knicks 73, Houston Rockets 93

The Summit, Houston, Texas

== 1994 NBA Finals rosters ==
=== Houston Rockets ===
1993–94 Houston Rockets roster
Players

Pos.	No.	Player	Height	Weight	DOB	From
PG	1	Scott Brooks	5 ft 11 in (1.80 m)	165 lb (75 kg)	1965–07–31	UC Irvine
PF	50	Matt Bullard	6 ft 10 in (2.08 m)	215 lb (98 kg)	1967–06–05	Iowa
PG	10	Sam Cassell	6 ft 3 in (1.91 m)	185 lb (84 kg)	1969–11–18	Florida State
PF	35	Earl Cureton	6 ft 9 in (2.06 m)	210 lb (95 kg)	1957–11–03	Detroit Mercy
SF	17	Mario Elie	6 ft 5 in (1.96 m)	210 lb (95 kg)	1963–11–26	American International
PF	7	Carl Herrera	6 ft 9 in (2.06 m)	215 lb (98 kg)	1966–12–14	Houston
PF	25	Robert Horry	6 ft 9 in (2.06 m)	220 lb (100 kg)	1970–08–25	Alabama
SF	21	Chris Jent	6 ft 7 in (2.01 m)	220 lb (100 kg)	1970–01–11	Ohio State
SG	11	Vernon Maxwell	6 ft 4 in (1.93 m)	180 lb (82 kg)	1965–09–12	Florida
C	34	Hakeem Olajuwon	7 ft 0 in (2.13 m)	255 lb (116 kg)	1963–01–21	Houston
C	3	Richard Petruška	6 ft 10 in (2.08 m)	260 lb (118 kg)	1969–01–25	UCLA
C	42	Eric Riley	7 ft 0 in (2.13 m)	245 lb (111 kg)	1970–06–02	Michigan
SG	20	Larry Robinson	6 ft 3 in (1.91 m)	180 lb (82 kg)	1968–01–11	Centenary
PG	30	Kenny Smith	6 ft 3 in (1.91 m)	170 lb (77 kg)	1965–03–08	North Carolina
PF	33	Otis Thorpe	6 ft 9 in (2.06 m)	225 lb (102 kg)	1962–08–05	Providence

Coaches
Head coach
- Rudy Tomjanovich
Assistant(s)
- Bill Berry
- Jim Boylen
- Carroll Dawson

Legend
- (DP) Unsigned draft pick
- (FA) Free agent
- (S) Suspended
- Injured

=== New York Knicks ===
1993–94 New York Knicks roster
Players

Pos.	No.	Player	Height	Weight	DOB	From
PG	50	Greg Anthony	6 ft 0 in (1.83 m)	176 lb (80 kg)	1967–11–15	UNLV
SG	20	Rolando Blackman	6 ft 6 in (1.98 m)	190 lb (86 kg)	1959–02–26	Kansas State
SF	4	Anthony Bonner	6 ft 8 in (2.03 m)	215 lb (98 kg)	1968–06–08	Saint Louis
SG	44	Hubert Davis	6 ft 5 in (1.96 m)	183 lb (83 kg)	1970–05–17	North Carolina
C	33	Patrick Ewing	7 ft 0 in (2.13 m)	240 lb (109 kg)	1962–08–05	Georgetown
SG	7	Corey Gaines	6 ft 3 in (1.91 m)	195 lb (88 kg)	1965–06–01	Loyola Marymount
PG	11	Derek Harper	6 ft 4 in (1.93 m)	185 lb (84 kg)	1961–10–13	Illinois
PF	14	Anthony Mason	6 ft 7 in (2.01 m)	250 lb (113 kg)	1966–12–14	Tennessee State
PF	34	Charles Oakley	6 ft 8 in (2.03 m)	225 lb (102 kg)	1963–12–18	Virginia Union
SF	54	Charles Smith	6 ft 10 in (2.08 m)	230 lb (104 kg)	1965–07–16	Pittsburgh
SG	3	John Starks	6 ft 3 in (1.91 m)	180 lb (82 kg)	1965–08–10	Oklahoma State
C	32	Herb Williams	6 ft 10 in (2.08 m)	242 lb (110 kg)	1958–02–16	Ohio State

Coaches
Head coach
- Pat Riley
Assistant(s)
- Dick Harter
- Jeff Nix
- Bob Salmi
- Jeff Van Gundy

Legend
- (DP) Unsigned draft pick
- (FA) Free agent
- (S) Suspended
- Injured

== Series summary ==
Game	Date	Road team	Result	Home team
Game 1	June 8	New York Knicks	78–85 (0–1)	Houston Rockets
Game 2	June 10	New York Knicks	91–83 (1–1)	Houston Rockets
Game 3	June 12	Houston Rockets	93–89 (2–1)	New York Knicks
Game 4	June 15	Houston Rockets	82–91 (2–2)	New York Knicks
Game 5	June 17	Houston Rockets	84–91 (2–3)	New York Knicks
Game 6	June 19	New York Knicks	84–86 (3–3)	Houston Rockets
Game 7	June 22	New York Knicks	84–90 (3–4)	Houston Rockets

== Game summaries ==
Note: Times are EDT (UTC−4) as listed by the NBA. For games in Houston, the local time is also given (CDT, UTC−5).

=== Game 1 ===
NBC

June 8
9:00 pm (8:00 pm CDT)

Box score

New York Knicks 78, Houston Rockets 85
Scoring by quarter: 24–26, 22–28, 17–18, 15–13
Pts: Patrick Ewing 23; Rebs: Charles Oakley 14; Asts: Derek Harper 5	Pts: Hakeem Olajuwon 28; Rebs: Otis Thorpe 16; Asts: Kenny Smith 5
Houston leads the series, 1–0

The Summit, Houston, Texas
Attendance: 16,611
Referees:
- No. 17 Joe Crawford
- No. 14 Jack Madden
- No. 27 Dick Bavetta

=== Game 2 ===
NBC

June 10
9:00 pm (8:00 pm CDT)

Box score

New York Knicks 91, Houston Rockets 83
Scoring by quarter: 24–20, 18–22, 30–23, 19–18
Pts: John Starks 19; Rebs: Patrick Ewing 13; Asts: John Starks 9	Pts: Hakeem Olajuwon 25; Rebs: Otis Thorpe 12; Asts: Kenny Smith 6
Series tied, 1–1

The Summit, Houston, Texas
Attendance: 16,611
Referees:
- No. 10 Darell Garretson
- No. 4 Ed T. Rush
- No. 42 Hue Hollins

=== Game 3 ===
NBC

June 12
7:00 pm

Box score

Houston Rockets 93, New York Knicks 89
Scoring by quarter: 26–18, 19–20, 24–25, 24–26
Pts: Hakeem Olajuwon 21; Rebs: Hakeem Olajuwon 11; Asts: Hakeem Olajuwon 7	Pts: Derek Harper 21; Rebs: Patrick Ewing 13; Asts: John Starks 9
Houston leads the series, 2–1

Madison Square Garden, New York City, New York
Attendance: 19,763
Referees:
- No. 11 Jake O'Donnell
- No. 20 Jess Kersey
- No. 21 Bill Oakes

=== Game 4 ===
NBC

June 15
9:00 pm

Box score

Houston Rockets 82, New York Knicks 91
Scoring by quarter: 14–19, 19–21, 28–20, 21–31
Pts: Hakeem Olajuwon 32; Rebs: Otis Thorpe 10; Asts: Sam Cassell 5	Pts: Derek Harper 21; Rebs: Charles Oakley 20; Asts: Derek Harper 5
Series tied, 2–2

Madison Square Garden, New York City, New York
Attendance: 19,763
Referees:
- No. 25 Hugh Evans
- No. 17 Joe Crawford
- No. 13 Mike Mathis

=== Game 5 ===
NBC

June 17
9:00 pm

Box score

Houston Rockets 84, New York Knicks 91
Scoring by quarter: 21–22, 16–26, 24–13, 23–30
Pts: Hakeem Olajuwon 27; Rebs: Otis Thorpe 13; Asts: Robert Horry 6	Pts: Patrick Ewing 25; Rebs: Patrick Ewing 12; Asts: Derek Harper 7
New York leads the series, 3–2

Madison Square Garden, New York City, New York
Attendance: 19,763
Referees:
- No. 10 Darell Garretson
- No. 4 Ed T. Rush
- No. 27 Dick Bavetta

=== Game 6 ===
NBC

June 19
7:00 pm (6:00 pm CDT)

Box score

New York Knicks 84, Houston Rockets 86
Scoring by quarter: 21–21, 15–25, 26–19, 22–21
Pts: John Starks 27; Rebs: Patrick Ewing 15; Asts: Derek Harper 10	Pts: Hakeem Olajuwon 30; Rebs: Olajuwon, Thorpe 10 each Asts: Otis Thorpe 6
Series tied, 3–3

The Summit, Houston, Texas
Attendance: 16,611
Referees:
- No. 11 Jake O'Donnell
- No. 20 Jess Kersey
- No. 14 Jack Madden

=== Game 7 ===
NBC

June 22
9:00 pm (8:00 pm CDT)

Box score

New York Knicks 84, Houston Rockets 90
Scoring by quarter: 21–22, 22–23, 17–18, 24–27
Pts: Derek Harper 23; Rebs: Charles Oakley 14; Asts: Derek Harper 5	Pts: Hakeem Olajuwon 25; Rebs: Hakeem Olajuwon 10; Asts: Hakeem Olajuwon 7
Houston wins the NBA Finals, 4–3

The Summit, Houston, Texas
Attendance: 16,611
Referees:
- No. 25 Hugh Evans
- No. 17 Joe Crawford
- No. 4 Ed T. Rush

This was the first professional championship for the city of Houston since 1975.

After the Rockets won the NBA championship, the league opted to hold the awarding ceremony on the court for the first time. In previous years, teams received the Larry O'Brien Championship Trophy inside their locker rooms.

External videos
- Full game broadcast by NBC on YouTube

== Olajuwon vs. Ewing ==
Although most fans in New York, and some members of the national media, considered John Starks, who shot 2-for-18 from the field in Game 7, a contributing factor in the Knicks' loss in the series, another important factor was Olajuwon's performance. Olajuwon outscored Ewing in every game of the series, while Ewing outblocked (4.3 to 3.9 bpg) and outrebounded him (12.4 rpg to 9.1 rpg). Ewing set a then NBA Finals record with a total of 30 blocks.

1994 NBA Finals	Gm 1	Gm 2	Gm 3	Gm 4	Gm 5	Gm 6	Gm 7	Totals
Hakeem Olajuwon	28	25	21	32	27	30	25	26.9 ppg 50.0% fg 9.1 rpg 3.6 apg 3.9 bpg
Patrick Ewing	23	16	18	16	25	17	17	18.9 ppg 36.4% fg 12.4 rpg 1.7 apg 4.3 bpg

== Player statistics ==
Legend
GP	Games played	GS	Games started	MPG	Minutes per game
FG%	Field-goal percentage	3P%	3-point field-goal percentage	FT%	Free-throw percentage
RPG	Rebounds per game	APG	Assists per game	SPG	Steals per game
BPG	Blocks per game	PPG	Points per game

Houston Rockets

Houston Rockets statistics
Player	GP	GS	MPG	FG%	3P%	FT%	RPG	APG	SPG	BPG	PPG
Matt Bullard	2	0	13.5	.200	.286	.500	3.0	0.0	0.5	0.5	4.0
Sam Cassell	7	0	22.6	.422	.438	.926	3.1	2.9	1.3	0.3	10.0
Earl Cureton	1	0	2.0	.000	.000	.000	0.0	0.0	0.0	0.0	0.0
Mario Elie	7	0	11.3	.250	.400	.833	1.0	1.0	0.3	0.1	2.4
Carl Herrera	7	0	17.3	.579	.000	.750	3.6	0.4	0.4	0.1	7.1
Robert Horry	7	7	37.9	.324	.306	.619	6.1	3.7	1.3	0.6	10.3
Chris Jent	3	0	2.3	.000	.000	.000	0.3	0.0	0.0	0.0	0.0
Vernon Maxwell	7	7	37.7	.365	.225	.682	3.3	2.9	0.6	0.0	13.4
Hakeem Olajuwon	7	7	43.1	.500	1.000	.860	9.1	3.6	1.6	3.9	26.9
Kenny Smith	7	7	25.4	.389	.357	1.000	1.4	3.1	0.7	0.0	5.6
Otis Thorpe	7	7	39.6	.519	.000	.500	11.3	3.3	0.9	0.0	9.3

New York Knicks

New York Knicks statistics
Player	GP	GS	MPG	FG%	3P%	FT%	RPG	APG	SPG	BPG	PPG
Greg Anthony	7	0	11.4	.323	.125	1.000	0.9	2.4	0.4	0.1	3.3
Anthony Bonner	2	0	5.5	1.000	.000	.000	1.0	0.0	0.0	0.0	2.0
Hubert Davis	5	0	7.6	.200	1.000	.500	0.4	0.4	0.0	0.2	1.6
Patrick Ewing	7	7	44.0	.363	.200	.714	12.4	1.7	1.3	4.3	18.9
Derek Harper	7	7	38.0	.467	.436	.824	3.0	6.0	2.4	0.1	16.4
Anthony Mason	7	0	29.3	.468	.000	.640	6.9	1.3	0.7	0.0	8.6
Charles Oakley	7	7	40.7	.484	.000	.833	11.9	2.4	1.1	0.1	11.0
Charles Smith	7	7	26.7	.441	.000	.684	4.3	1.7	0.6	1.0	9.3
John Starks	7	7	41.9	.368	.320	.769	3.1	5.9	1.6	0.1	17.7
Herb Williams	4	0	1.8	.000	.000	.000	0.0	0.0	0.0	0.3	0.0

== Breaking news interruption ==
During Game 5, most NBC affiliates split the coverage of the game between NFL Hall of Famer O. J. Simpson's slow speed freeway chase with the Los Angeles Police Department. At the time, Simpson was an NFL analyst on NBC.

NBA studio host Bob Costas acted as the anchor for both events, tossing to Marv Albert for the game and then to Tom Brokaw of NBC News for updates on the chase. Costas, a colleague of Simpson's on the network's NFL coverage, later learned that Simpson had called 30 Rockefeller Plaza during the chase and asked to speak to him but Costas had been on site at the Garden.

KNBC in Los Angeles, serving the media market where the police were tracking Simpson, left the Game 5 broadcast completely for the chase with local coverage narrated by Paul Moyer and Colleen Williams; the station did not put up a split screen until the end of the game, which was still close. By that point, Simpson had returned to his mansion in Brentwood and surrendered to police.

A complete re-broadcast of Game 5, with natural crowd audio substituting for the parts for which NBC did not provide audio, is part of the DVD release of this series from Warner Home Video.

== Aftermath ==
Afterwards, Pat Riley admitted that his biggest mistake of the series was not benching John Starks during Game 7 of the Finals. Starks struggled severely, shooting 2-of-18 from the field (0-for-11 from three-point range) against a Rockets team who were willingly letting him shoot his team out of a championship. Despite this, Riley kept him in, with options like Rolando Blackman or Hubert Davis on the bench. In 2025, he stated, "the biggest disappointment in my career was losing the 1994 NBA championship. I let him [Patrick Ewing] down. I didn’t do enough. I could’ve made a couple of different moves. I could have gotten him better shots. To this day, I can’t look him in the eye." When the Knicks won their first championship in 53 years in 2026, Ewing, who attended many of the team's games, stated, "I can finally say that I'm part of a championship team [now]".

The Rockets repeated as NBA champions in 1995 although their season record was worse. Plagued by a lack of chemistry, the Rockets were stuck in the middle of the conference standings most of the year. Then, as the NBA's trading deadline approached, on February 14, 1995, the Rockets acquired Olajuwon's "Phi Slama Jama" teammate Clyde Drexler. The Rockets finished the regular season as the sixth seed in the Western Conference, but the team on the court at season's end was clearly better than its 47–35 record. The new Rockets team had only had about two months to gel, but they overcame the adversity, defeating four teams that won 50 or more games to win the championship, capped off with a sweep of the Shaquille O'Neal-led Orlando Magic in the Finals, becoming the lowest seed ever to win it all.

During the Finals, Viacom stepped up in trying to sell their Madison Square Garden properties, which included the Knicks and the New York Rangers. In August 1994, Viacom sold the Knicks to Cablevision Systems and the ITT Corporation (the latter sold its shares years later). Also in 1995, the Knicks enjoyed another strong season, with 55 wins, but were eliminated in seven games by the Indiana Pacers during the second round as Pacers guard Reggie Miller's "Knick Killer" legacy continued. After the season, Pat Riley left the Knicks after they balked at his request for a stake in ownership and the role of team president in negotiations for an extension. He departed for the Miami Heat, with whom he won three championships, one as head coach and two as president. The Knicks returned to the NBA Finals in 1999 as the first eighth seeded team in North American sports history to reach the championship round of the four major leagues, but fell to the Tim Duncan and David Robinson-led San Antonio Spurs in five games. The Knicks did not win a championship until 2026, where they returned the favor and defeated the Spurs, led by French phenom Victor Wembanyama, in five games.

Before this victory, the Houston Oilers' AFL two championships at the close of the 1960 season and 1961 season and the Houston Aeros' two WHA Avco World Trophies in 1974 and 1975 represented Houston's only professional championships. The 1994 NBA championship represented the city of Houston's first professional championship since those two teams, and the first in a league that did not later merge.

This was the last NBA Finals for three of the league's longest-tenured and most recognizable referees: Darell Garretson, Jack Madden and Jake O'Donnell. Garretson and Madden retired after the 1994 Finals, while O'Donnell worked the 1994–95 season, but did not work past the second round of the playoffs, marking the first time since 1971 he did not officiate in the championship series. O'Donnell retired in December 1995 following the end of a lockout of NBA referees by commissioner David Stern.

Knicks lead assistant and their head coach dring the 1999 NBA Finals run, Jeff Van Gundy, would later coach the Rockets from 2003–2007.

Overall, as of 2022, Houston's teams in the "Big Four" major professional sports are 7–1 over their New York City counterparts in playoff meetings. The Rockets, in addition to their 1994 triumph, also defeated the Knicks in the 1975 Eastern Conference first round. The NFL's Houston Oilers (now Tennessee Titans) followed with a victory over the New York Jets in the 1991 AFC wild card round, and the Houston Astros later prevailed over the New York Yankees in four MLB postseason series (the 2015 ALWC, 2017 ALCS, 2019 ALCS and 2022 ALCS). The only New York-based team that prevailed over Houston was the New York Mets, who won over the then-NL member Astros in the NLCS in their 1986 championship season.

Both cities' WNBA counterparts later faced each other in three WNBA Finals series between 1997 and 2000, with the Houston Comets defeating the New York Liberty in every one of their championship meetings. The Comets also won the first four WNBA championships.

Former Rockets owner Leslie Alexander maintains possession of the 1994 and 1995 championship trophies; the former trophy was unexpectedly dropped and dented by reserve center Richard Petruška during the celebration. Tiffany created replicas of the Rockets' championship trophies in 2018, which have since been displayed inside Toyota Center.

== See also ==
- 1993–94 New York Knicks season
- 1993–94 Houston Rockets season
- 1994 NBA playoffs
- Clutch City
