= Hugo (mascot) =

Mascot for the NBA's Charlotte Hornets

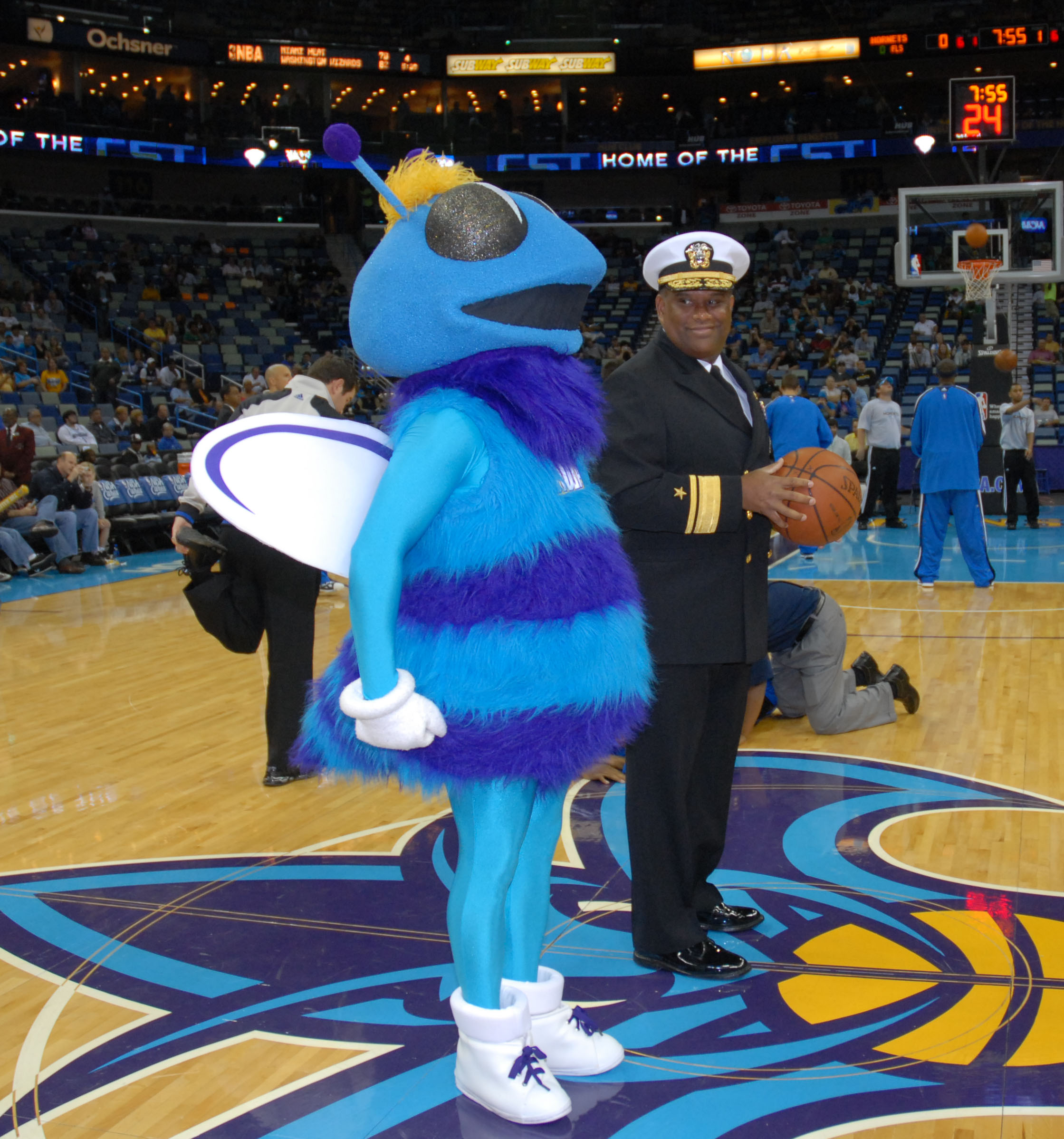
Rear Adm. Victor G. Guillory and Hugo (New Orleans Hornets mascot)

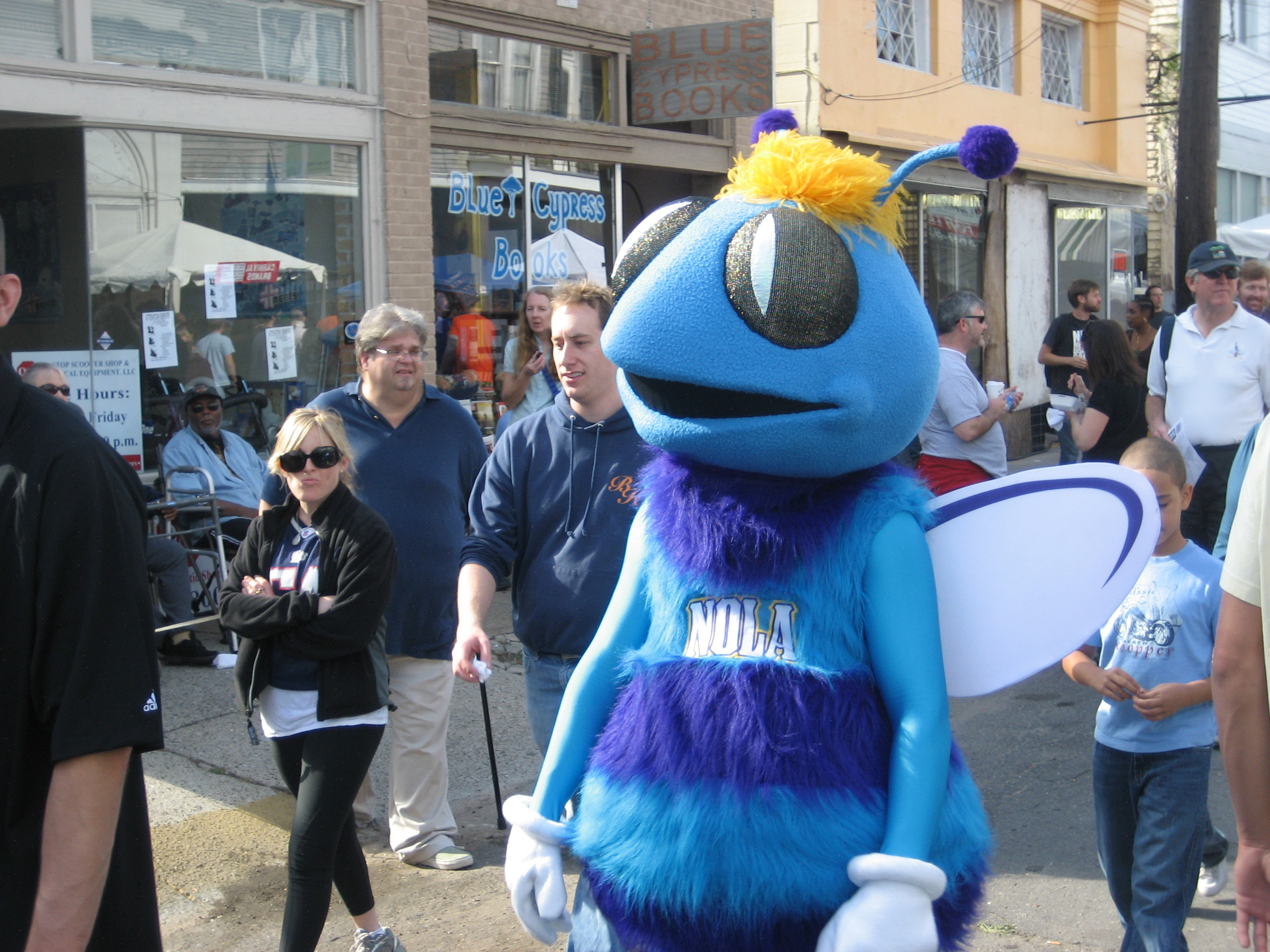
Hugo the Hornet, mascot of the New Orleans Hornets during the 2nd annual Po-Boy Festival in 2008.

Hugo (or Hugo the Hornet) is the mascot of the Charlotte Hornets of the National Basketball Association. Designed by Cheryl Henson, daughter of Jim Henson, Hugo the Hornet was created in 1988, one year before Hurricane Hugo hit the Carolinas.

== History ==
The Hugo moniker was selected from a pool of more than 6,000 fan suggestions, and was inaugurated as part of the Charlotte Hornets' first season. In the aftermath of the damage resulting from Hurricane Hugo in September 1989, the Hornets announced that the Hugo moniker would remain, and the mascot's name would not be changed to Hoser or Hank.

During a break between the first and second quarters of a 2008 game between the New Orleans Hornets and the San Antonio Spurs, Hugo jumped off a trampoline through a ring of fire and dunked a basketball. Afterwards, the New Orleans Arena crew responsible for cleanup used the wrong fire extinguisher and were unable to put the fire out, resulting in the arena filling with smoke and causing a 19-minute delay. NBA Executive Vice President of Basketball Operations Stu Jackson canceled the halftime show and later fined the team. During the halftime show, TV commentator Charles Barkley dared Hugo to repeat the stunt after the 3rd quarter. Barkley continued calling out Hugo throughout the night and in the next game.

After the New Orleans team became the Pelicans in 2013, Hugo was retired in favor of Pierre the Pelican. On December 21, 2013, the Charlotte Bobcats announced they would reclaim the Hornets name and Hugo the Hornet for the 2014–15 season. Hugo officially returned to Charlotte on June 5, 2014.

== Awards ==
Hugo is a 4-time winner of the NBA Mascot Slam Dunk Championship. Hugo is also a 2-time winner of the NBA Best Mascot Award by NBA Inside Stuff, a magazine that he has been featured in on numerous occasions. In addition, Hugo has also been featured in such foreign magazines as New Sports and 5 Majeur.

== In other media ==
Hugo, as well as three other NBA mascots (Benny the Bull, Crunch the Wolf and The Suns Gorilla), appears as a hidden player in the video game NBA Jam Tournament Edition.
