= Stuff the Magic Dragon =

Mascot of the Orlando Magic

Stuff the Magic Dragon is the official mascot of the Orlando Magic of the National Basketball Association (NBA). His name is a play on the Peter, Paul and Mary song "Puff, the Magic Dragon", and the basketball slang term "stuff" (which means to either slam dunk or reject a slam dunk shot).

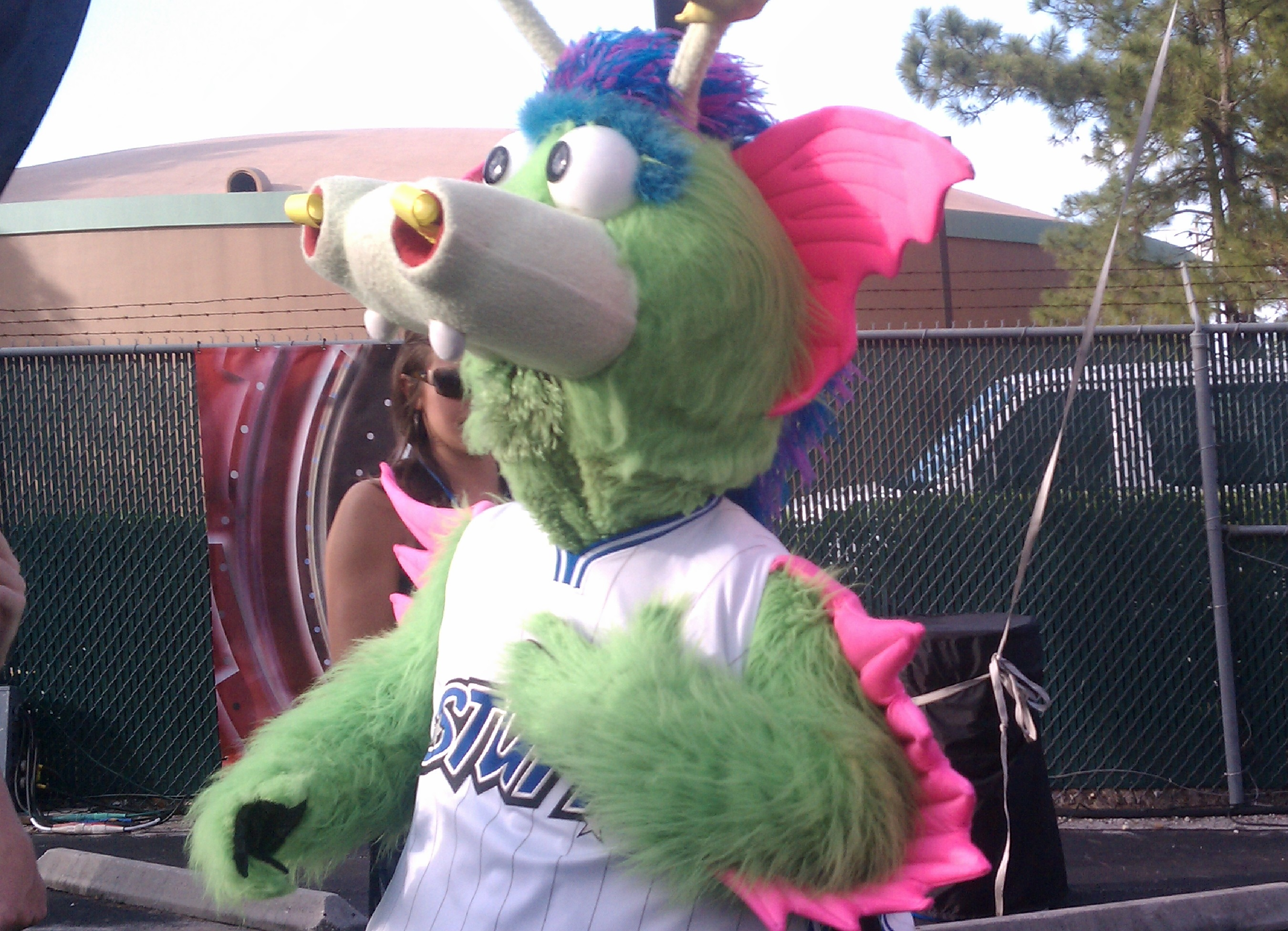
Stuff at ESPN The Weekend in 2011

== Biography ==
Stuff the Magic Dragon, described as "the tallest dragon in Orlando's history," was introduced in a giant egg on Church Street in 1989, where Dave Raymond, the original Phillie Phanatic, portrayed him for his "birth". He was "originally the Magic's #1 pick in the supplemental dragon back draft, directly out of clown college." Stuff is said to live in the Dragon's Lair at Orlando's Kia Center and has his own play area, "Stuff's Magic Castle" on the promenade level. Many think that Stuff is a copy of the Philly Phanatic, but the two mascots were made by the same company, Acme Mascots (Harrison/Erickson), which made many popular mascots including the retired Yankees mascot "Dandy", the Hornets mascot Hugo, and Montreal's Youppi!. According to original Magic general manager Pat Williams, various other mascot ideas were thrown before the dragon, including a rabbit, a wizard and a magic bean.

== Appearance ==
Stuff is a neon green dragon with a blue unibrow. two teeth on his snout, two magician's wands on his head, a long blue and pink mane, black shoes with stars on them and pink wings on the sides of his head and on his arms. Stuff also has yellow puffers that inflate and deflate and come out of his nostrils to represent the "fire" that comes out of a dragon's nostrils. He is recognisable by his white Magic jersey with his logo on the front. but he also has black and blue jerseys. During the 2010 playoffs, Stuff appeared wearing royal blue fur instead of his usual neon green.

== Antics ==
Stuff comes out on the court pre-game to do a skit and toss out T-shirts; during the game, he often ventures around in the stand and does more skits during breaks and between quarters. Most skits can be from a trampoline dunk show (by himself or with the Orlando Magic Flight Crew), a pump-up session with giant signs, break-dancing in the middle of the court, or dancing to a song compilation. A special song made for the mascot plays during his entrances. He also makes grand entrances during special events like the playoffs or opening night where he comes down from the rafters on a zip line or bungee. He also has two air-mascot counterparts, Air Stuff and Air Stuff Jr., and has a miniature mascot of him named Mini-Stuff. He gained nationwide popularity when he was featured on "The Tonight Show", hosted by Jimmy Fallon, during a dance off with their mascot, Hashtag the panda, during a week-long special in Orlando. He also made headlines when he proposed to Kate Upton.

Stuff is also the host of the now-defunct annual "Celebrity Mascot Games" that takes place each year at the Kia Center. Each year, mascots from North America come to Orlando and compete in Olympic-style games while being in different colored teams. The Mascot Games were made for the non-profit organization, "New Hope For Kids", to raise money and attention for them. The games started in 1992 at the old Amway Arena and have continued annually until 2019 with the exception in 2013 which was due to lack of a new partnership for the company. The Games was originally cancelled from 2020 to 2022, then eventually discontinued.

During his career, Stuff has been seen with many other sports mascots at numerous mascot-oriented events. Each year, about 4-5 mascots (locally and across the country) come to Orlando and do opportunities for pictures and meet and greets pre-game and during the game. Stuff and his mascot guests also do special skits, which normally include a mascot dunk show, a halftime skit, and a short number from the mascots' air counterparts.

Stuff has recently received more popularity after the NBA All Star Game's Verizon Slam Dunk Contest, where he assisted Magic player Aaron Gordon during the event. He won the NBA Mascot Conference's Mascot of the Year award in 2016.

== Awards ==
- Mascot of the Year – 2016, 2017, 2026
