= Rumble the Bison =

Official mascot of the Oklahoma City Thunder

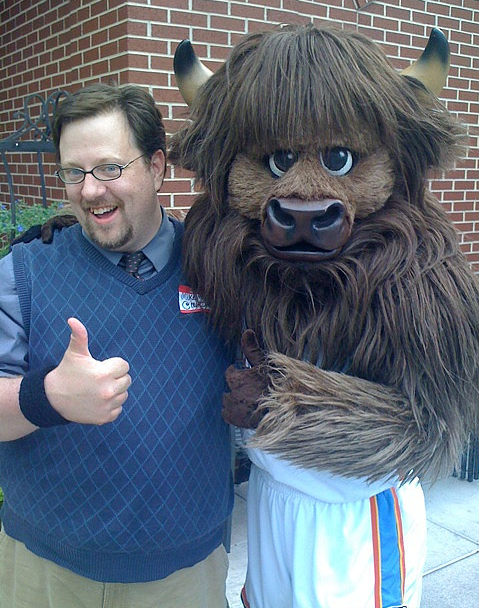
- "Rumble the Bison", right, with a fan
- Team: Oklahoma City Thunder
- Conference: National Basketball Association
- Description: Anthropomorphic bison
- First seen: February 17, 2009
- Related mascot(s): Wheedle, Squatch
- Website: Official website

Rumble the Bison is the official mascot of the Oklahoma City Thunder, a National Basketball Association (NBA) franchise based in Oklahoma City, Oklahoma. He is an anthropomorphic bison and his name derives from the sound that thunder makes. Rumble debuted on February 17, 2009, as part of the halftime show during the Thunder's game against the New Orleans Hornets.

On August 13, 2009, Rumble was awarded the NBA Mascot of the Year award at the NBA's annual mascot meeting in Las Vegas. Rumble received the award in recognition of representing the Thunder at various community events throughout the Oklahoma City region. Even though he had only served as the team's official mascot for six months at the time, the mascot program Rumble developed was regarded as one of the best in the NBA. Rumble is a very popular mascot on account of his interaction with fans. He constantly gives hugs, high fives, and T-shirts to fans at random.

Rumble's trademark is banging a bass drum at the start of each game to hype the home crowds. He has played drums of all sizes for a variety of purposes as well.

It is estimated that the performer who brings the mascot to life earns between $80,000 and $100,000 a year.

== Official backstory ==
According to his official backstory on the Oklahoma City Thunder's website, Rumble is the subject of a Native American tale that has been passed down for centuries, which tells of a bison who was struck by lightning while saving his herd from a ferocious storm in the Arbuckle Mountains. The lightning transformed him into the anthropomorphic, super-powered bison known today as Rumble. When the Thunder arrived in Oklahoma City, he identified with them and joined the team.
