= Jazz Bear =

Mascot of the Utah Jazz

Jazz Bear is the mascot for the Utah Jazz, a National Basketball Association (NBA) franchise based in Salt Lake City, Utah.

Jazz Bear was introduced to the league on November 4, 1994. Since Jazz Bear's introduction, he has performed at over 800 Jazz home games by entertaining the audience during breaks in basketball play. Former Utah Governor Gary Herbert declared October 10, 2013 as "Jazz Bear Day" in recognition of his 20th season as the Utah Jazz' mascot, and also his countless hours of community and public service and his standing as an important citizen of Utah. In 2006, Jazz Bear was inducted into the Mascot Hall of Fame. Jazz Bear has been named Mascot of the Year 5 times, and has won 8 Mascot Leadership Awards. The Bear has suffered many injuries while performing, including tearing his bicep and rupturing a tendon in his calf.

On October 19, 2018, it was reported that Jon Absey, who had performed as the Jazz Bear for twenty-four years, was fired due to unspecified disputes with management. Absey died in January 2026.

Shortly before the 2024–25 NHL season, the expansion Utah Mammoth (then known as the Utah Hockey Club) of the National Hockey League (NHL) announced that Jazz Bear would also serve as their temporary mascot for their inaugural season, ahead of their permanent mascot, named Tusky, being revealed the following season.
