= Clutch (mascot) =

Mascot of the Houston Rockets of the NBA

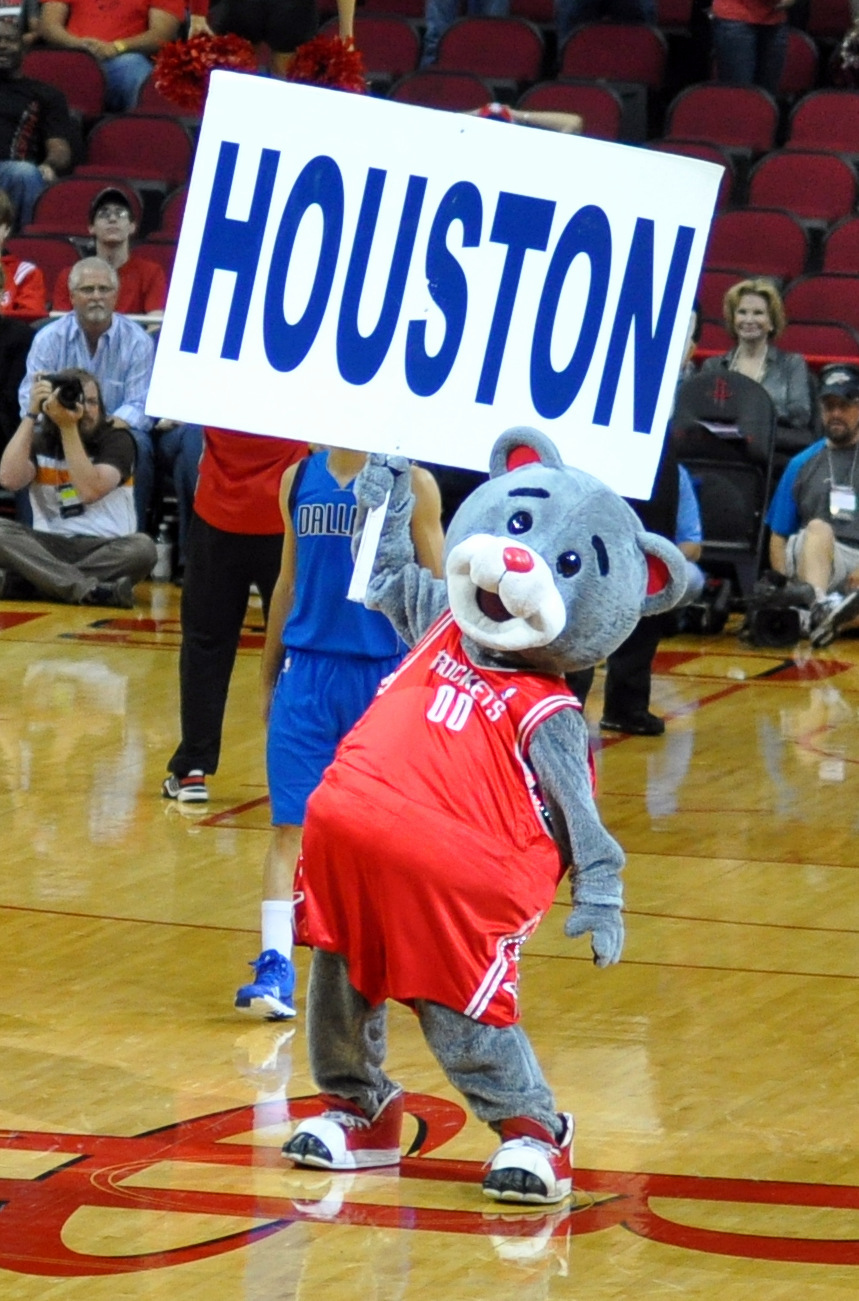
Clutch entertains the crowd prior to a game, 2013.

Clutch the Rocket Bear is the mascot for the NBA's Houston Rockets.

The informal nickname "Clutch City" was given to Houston, Texas after the Rockets won their first NBA championship in the 1993–94 season. The moniker was adopted in response to a front-page headline in the Houston Chronicle declaring Houston to be "Choke City" after blowing a 20-point lead earlier in that postseason. Character designer Tom Sapp of Real Characters, Inc. created the bear mascot, appropriately named "Clutch," which was introduced on March 14, 1995.

Clutch was named the 5th-most recognizable mascot in sports by USA Today in February 2005, and was inducted into the Mascot Hall of Fame in 2006. He also became the 2005 NBA Mascot of the Year. He also won the 2013 NBA Mascot of the Year. He received even more attention in an Internet meme that involved a man being shot down during a halftime marriage proposal at a Rockets game in 2008. After the woman said "no" and stormed off the court, Clutch consoled him and walked him off, grabbing somebody's beer on the way out and giving it to the man. Some have questioned whether the incident was actually staged. Clutch continues to entertain crowds in the Toyota Center in Houston, Texas.

In 2019, Clutch was featured in a television commercial for State Farm Insurance alongside then Rockets players James Harden and Chris Paul and actor Oscar Nuñez.
