= NBA Finals Most Valuable Player =

National Basketball Association award

Bill Russell NBA Finals MVP Award
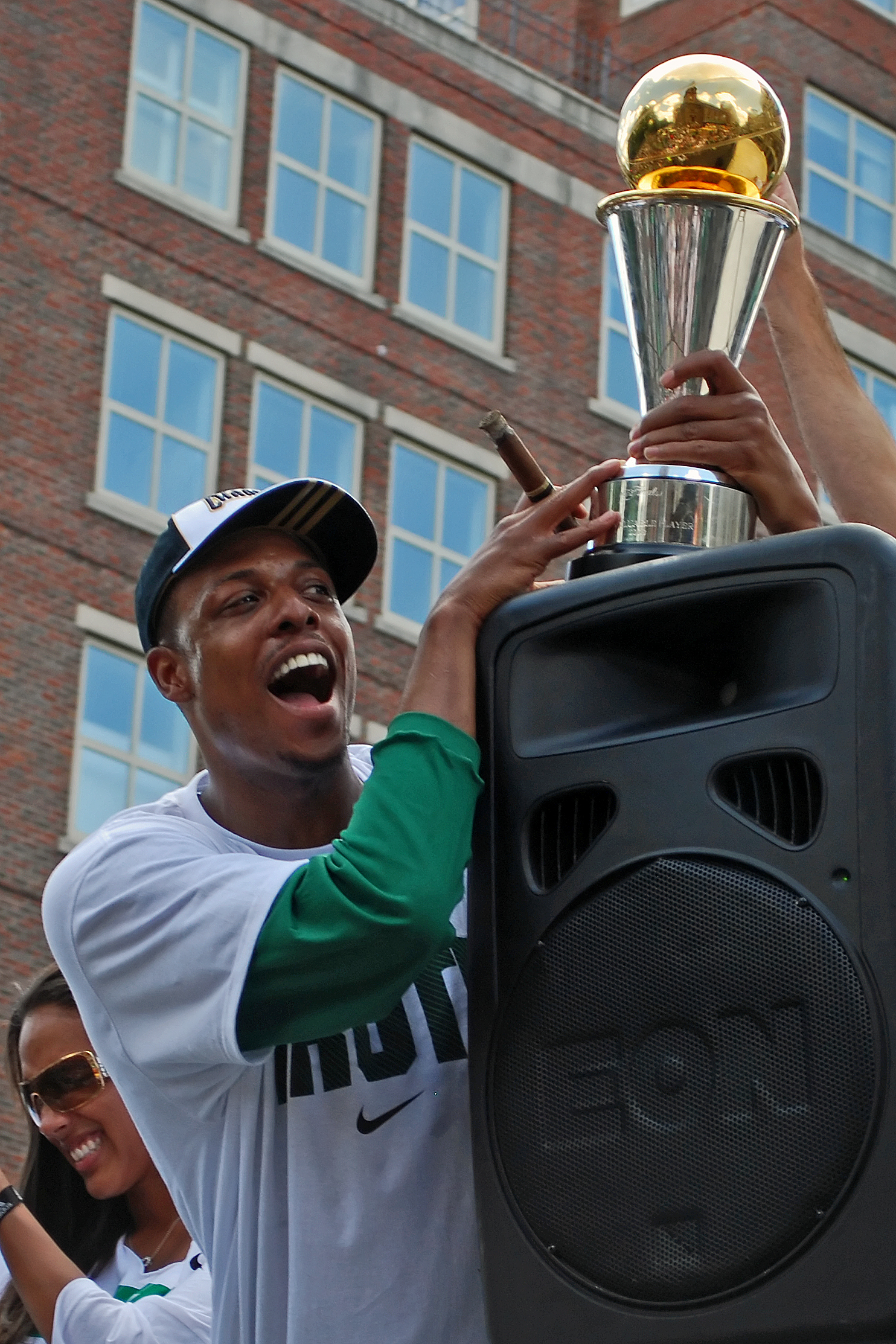
- Paul Pierce with his 2008 NBA Finals MVP trophy
- Sport: Basketball
- League: National Basketball Association
- Awarded for: Most valuable player of the NBA Finals

History
- First award: 1969
- First winner: Jerry West
- Most wins: Michael Jordan (6 awards)
- Most recent: Jalen Brunson (1st award)

The Bill Russell NBA Finals Most Valuable Player (formerly known as the NBA Finals Most Valuable Player) is an annual National Basketball Association (NBA) award given since the 1969 NBA Finals. The award is decided by a panel of eleven media members, who cast votes after the conclusion of the Finals. The person with the highest number of votes wins the award. The award was originally a black trophy with a gold basketball-shaped sphere at the top, similar to the Larry O'Brien Trophy, until a new trophy was introduced in 2005.

Since its inception, the award has been given 55 times to 34 players. Michael Jordan is a record six-time award winner. LeBron James has won the award four times in his career, and Magic Johnson, Shaquille O'Neal, and Tim Duncan won three times each. Jordan and O'Neal are the only players to win the award in three consecutive seasons (Jordan accomplished the feat on two occasions). Johnson is the only rookie ever to win the award, as well as the youngest at 20 years and 276 days old. In 1985, Kareem Abdul-Jabbar became the oldest to win at 38 years and 54 days old. Andre Iguodala is the only winner to have not started every game in the series. Jerry West, the first awardee (1969), is the only person to win the award while being on the losing team.

Willis Reed, Kareem Abdul-Jabbar, (Note: Before the 1971–72 season, Lew Alcindor changed his name to Kareem Abdul-Jabbar.) Larry Bird, Hakeem Olajuwon, Kobe Bryant, Kawhi Leonard and Kevin Durant won the award twice. Olajuwon, Durant, Bryant, and James have won the award in two consecutive seasons. James is the only player to have won the award with three different teams, while he and Leonard are the only players to have won the award in both conferences. Johnson, Moses Malone, Durant, and Leonard are the only players to have been named Finals MVP in their first season with a team. Olajuwon of Nigeria (who became a naturalized U.S. citizen in 1993), Tony Parker of France, Dirk Nowitzki of Germany, Giannis Antetokounmpo of Greece, Nikola Jokić of Serbia, and Shai Gilgeous-Alexander of Canada are the only international players to win the award. Duncan is an American citizen, but is considered an "international" player by the NBA because he was not born in one of the fifty states or Washington, D.C. Parker, Nowitzki, Antetokounmpo and Jokić are the only winners to have been trained totally outside the U.S.; Olajuwon played college basketball at Houston, Duncan at Wake Forest, and Gilgeous-Alexander at Kentucky. Cedric Maxwell is the only Finals MVP winner eligible for the Hall of Fame who has not been voted in. The only NBA draft second round picks to win the award are Jalen Brunson, Dennis Johnson, Nikola Jokić and Willis Reed.

Eight players have won this award after winning an NCAA Division I men's basketball tournament and four of those had also won state high school championships: Kareem Abdul-Jabbar, Bill Walton, Magic Johnson and Jalen Brunson.

On February 14, 2009, during the 2009 NBA All-Star Weekend in Phoenix, then-NBA Commissioner David Stern announced that the award would be renamed the "Bill Russell NBA Finals Most Valuable Player Award" in honor of 11-time NBA champion Bill Russell.

== Winners ==
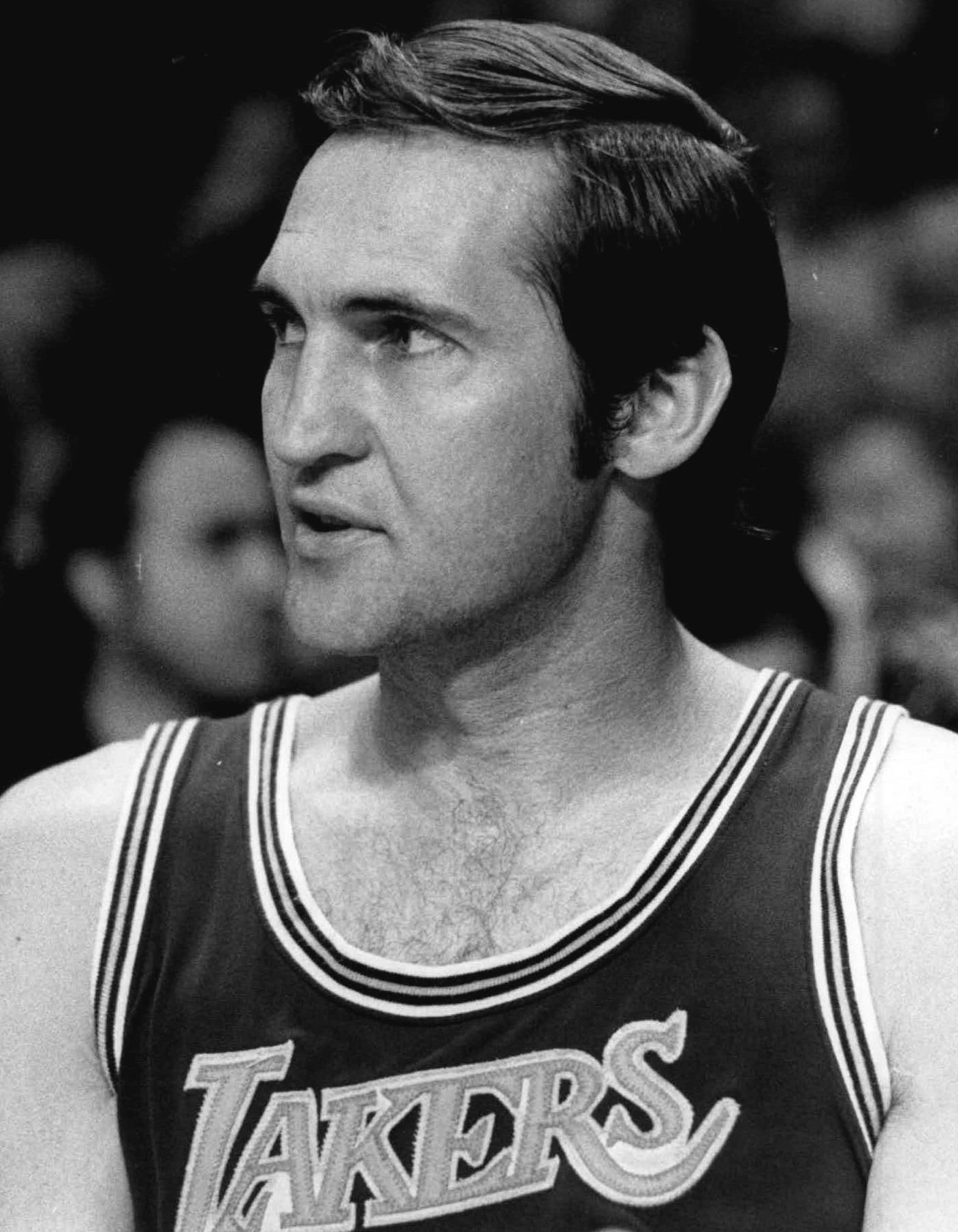
Jerry West, the inaugural recipient, is the only player to win the award while being on the losing team.

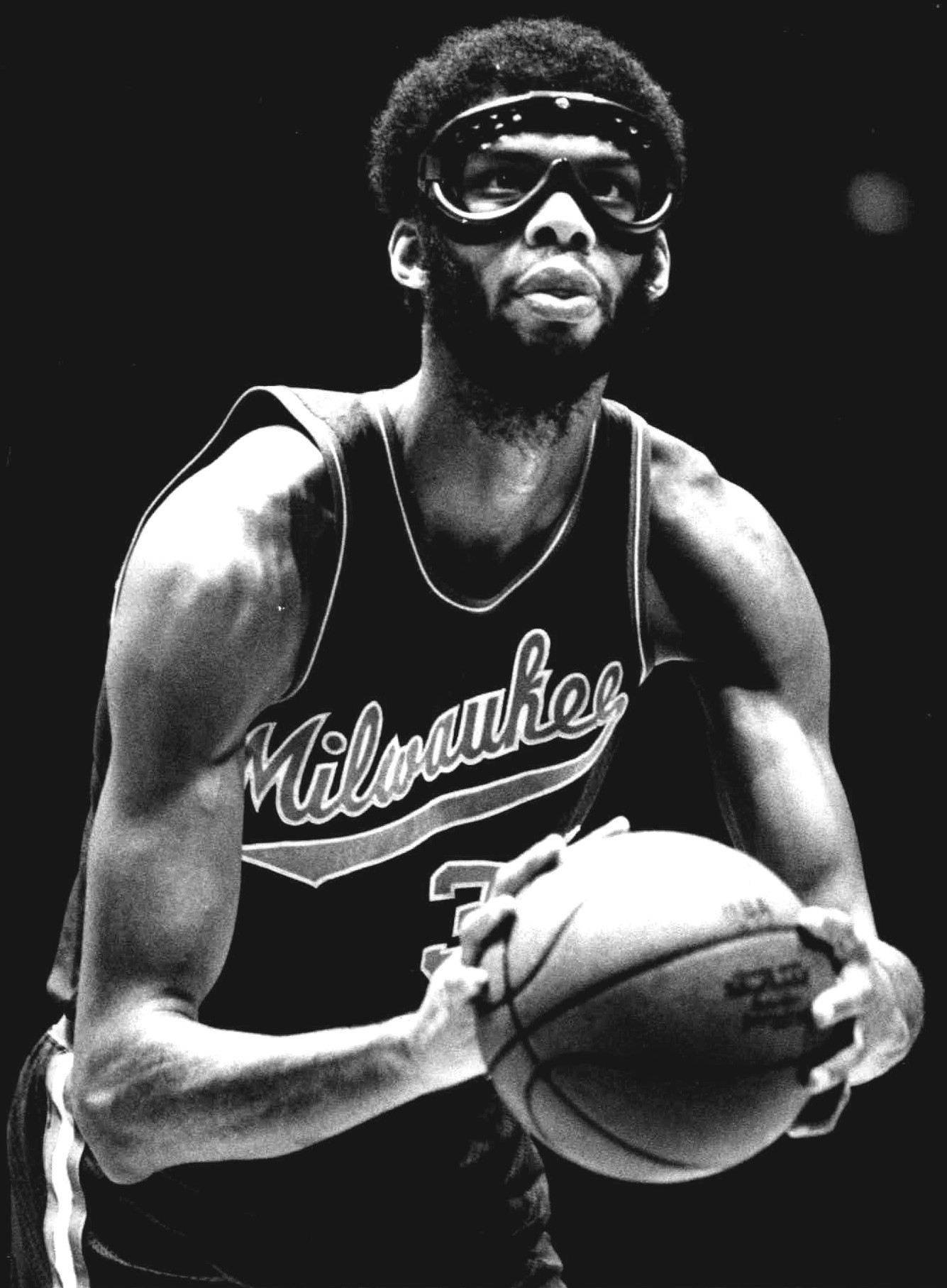
Kareem Abdul-Jabbar, who won twice in 1971 and 1985, holds the record for the longest gap between awards

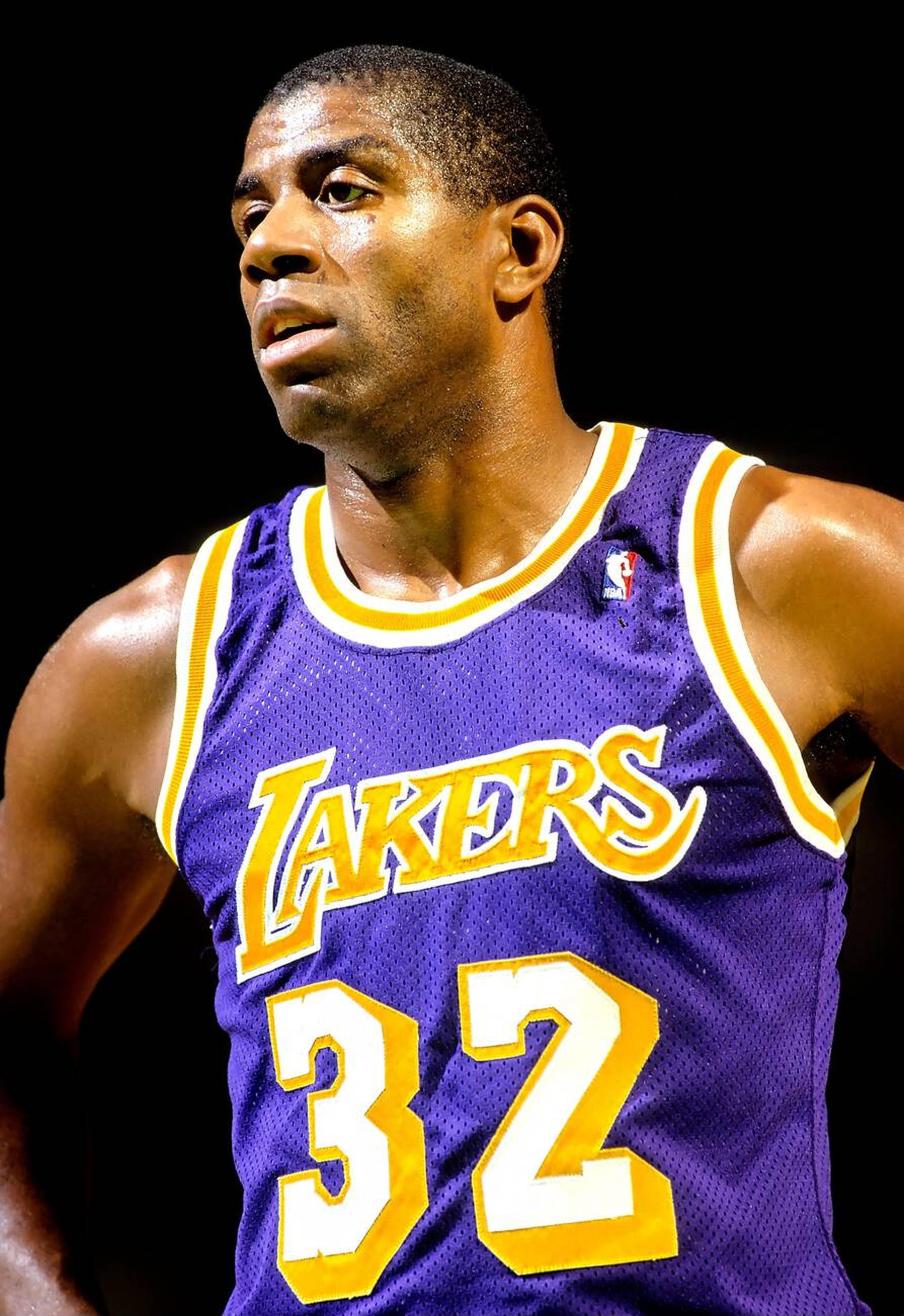
Magic Johnson is the only player to win the award as a rookie.

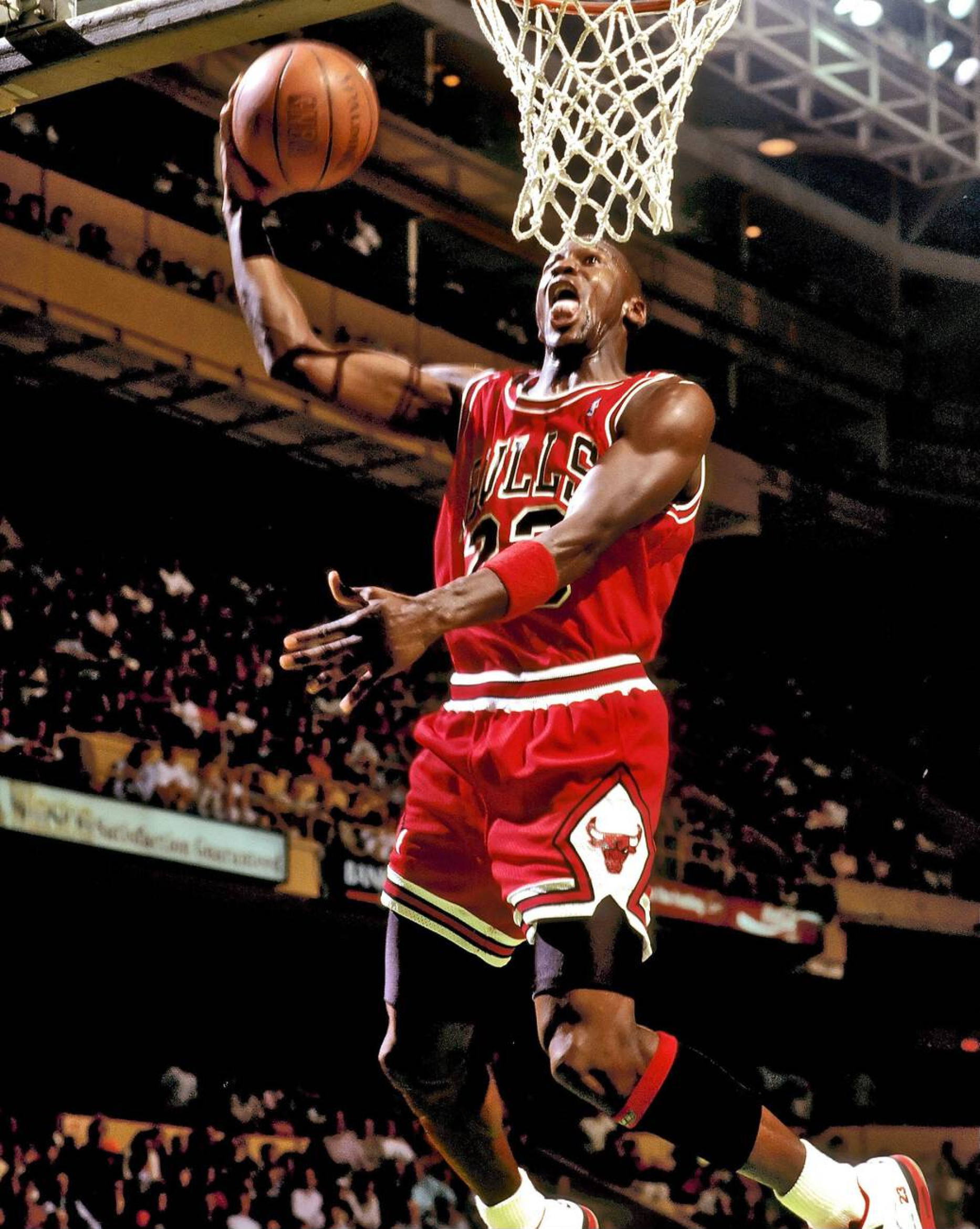
Michael Jordan has won the award a record six times.

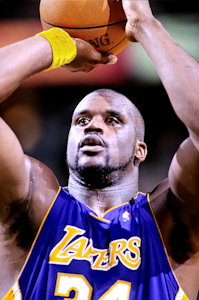
Shaquille O'Neal is the only player other than Michael Jordan to have won the award three times consecutively.

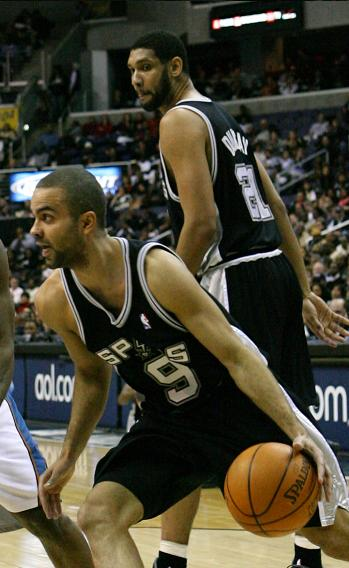
Tony Parker (front) was the second player born outside the US to win the award, joining Hakeem Olajuwon. Tim Duncan (back) won the Finals MVP three times.

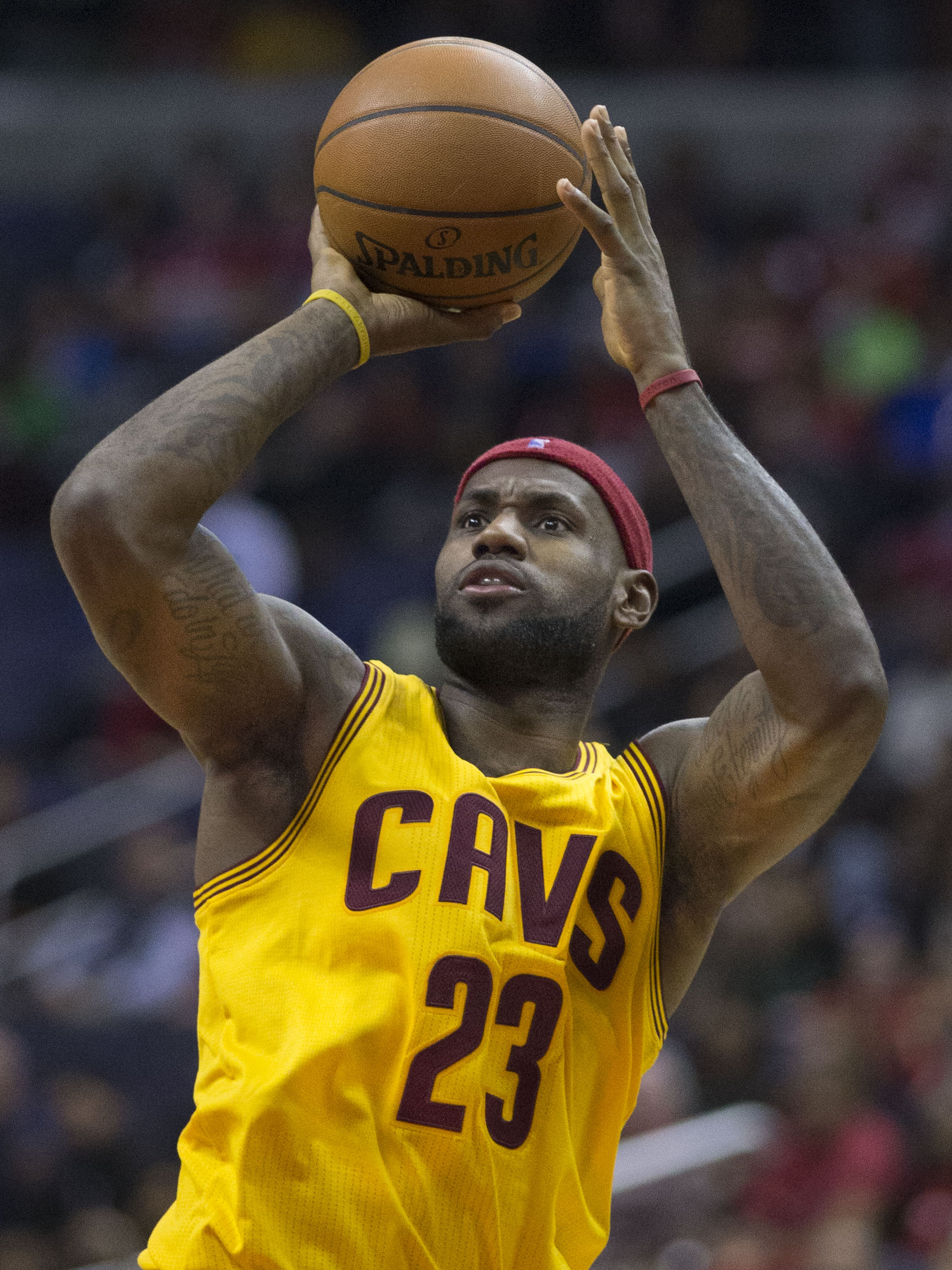
LeBron James is the only player to win the award with three different teams.

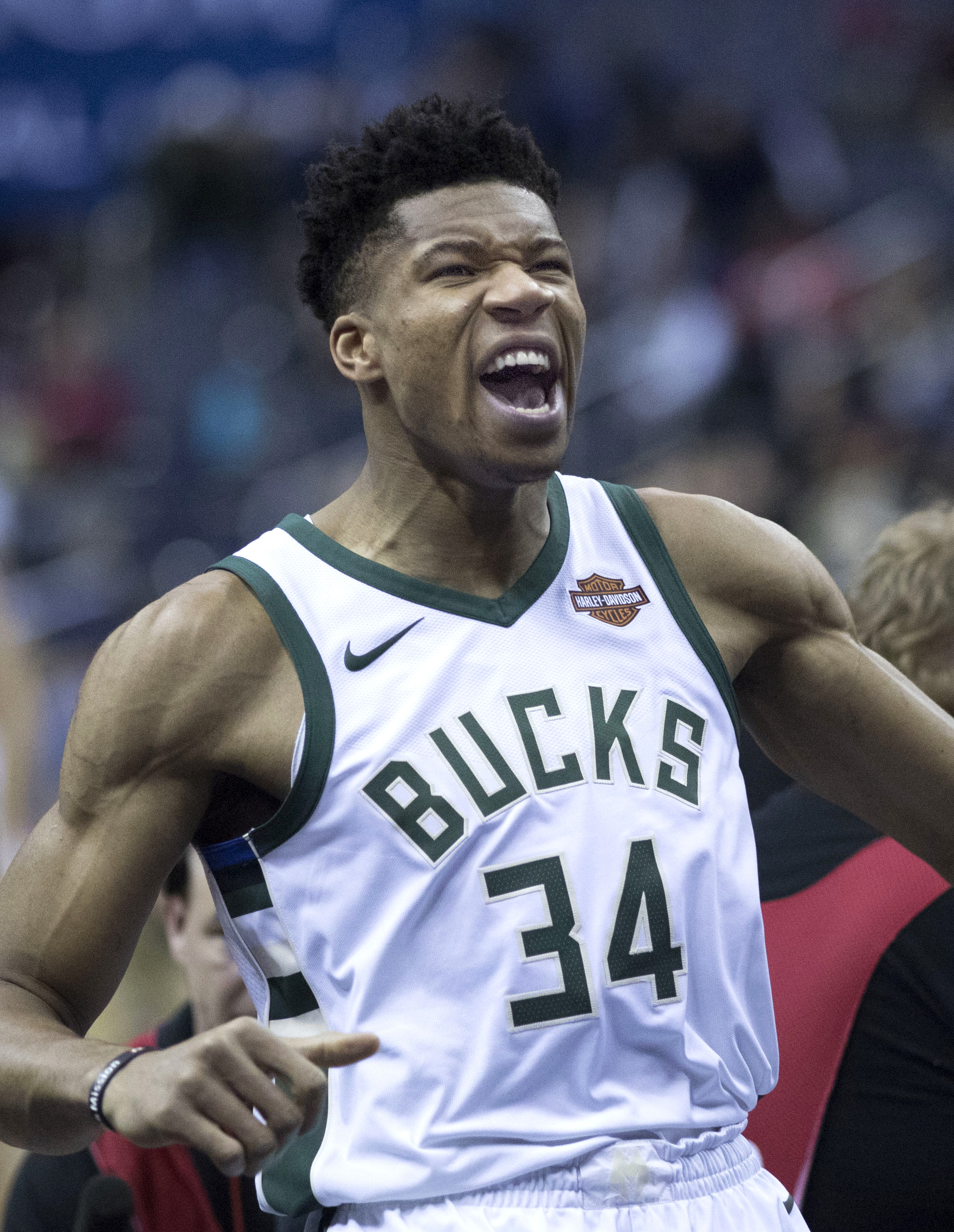
Giannis Antetokounmpo is the first player from Greece to win the award.

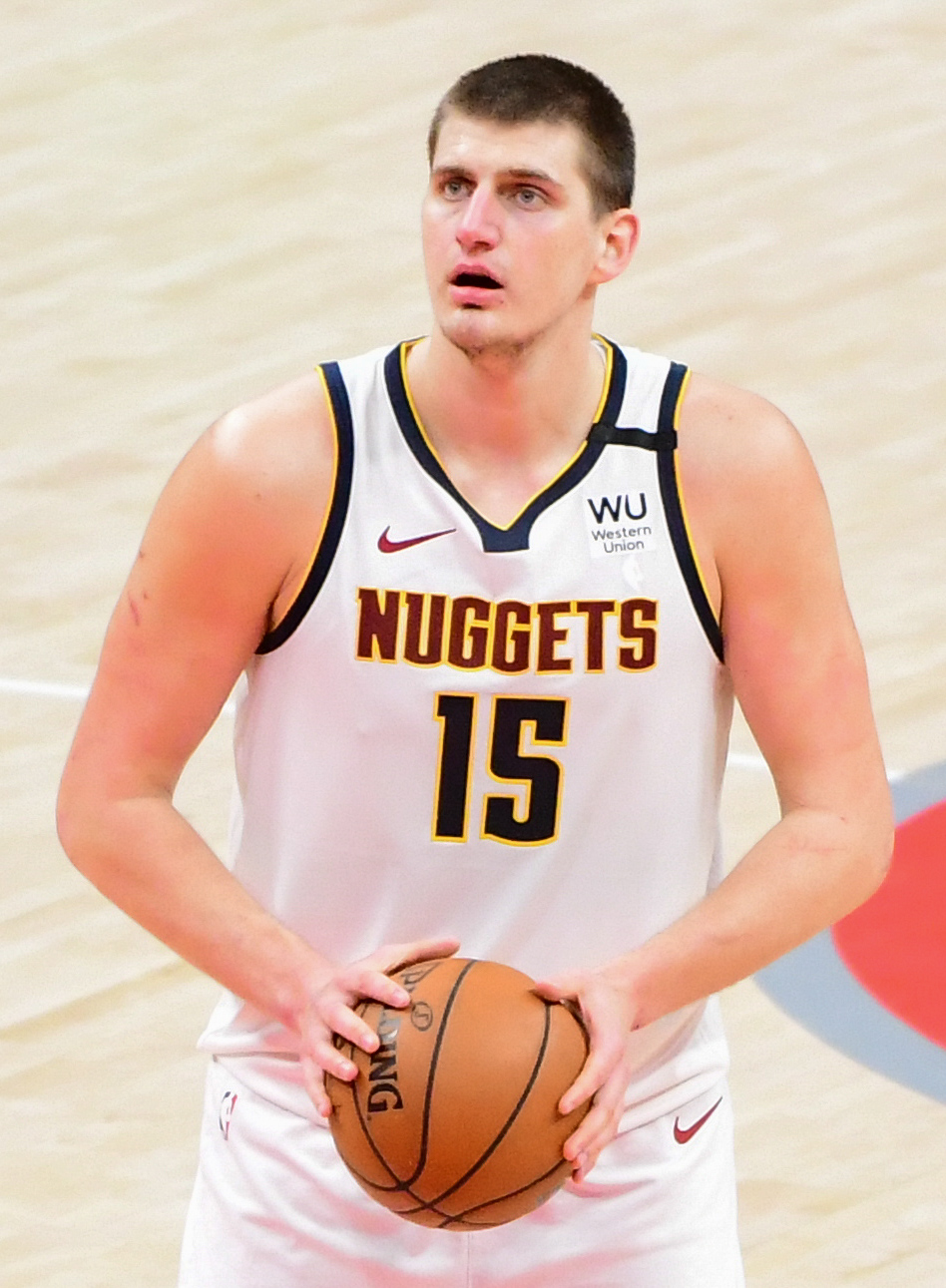
Nikola Jokić is the first player from Serbia to win the award.

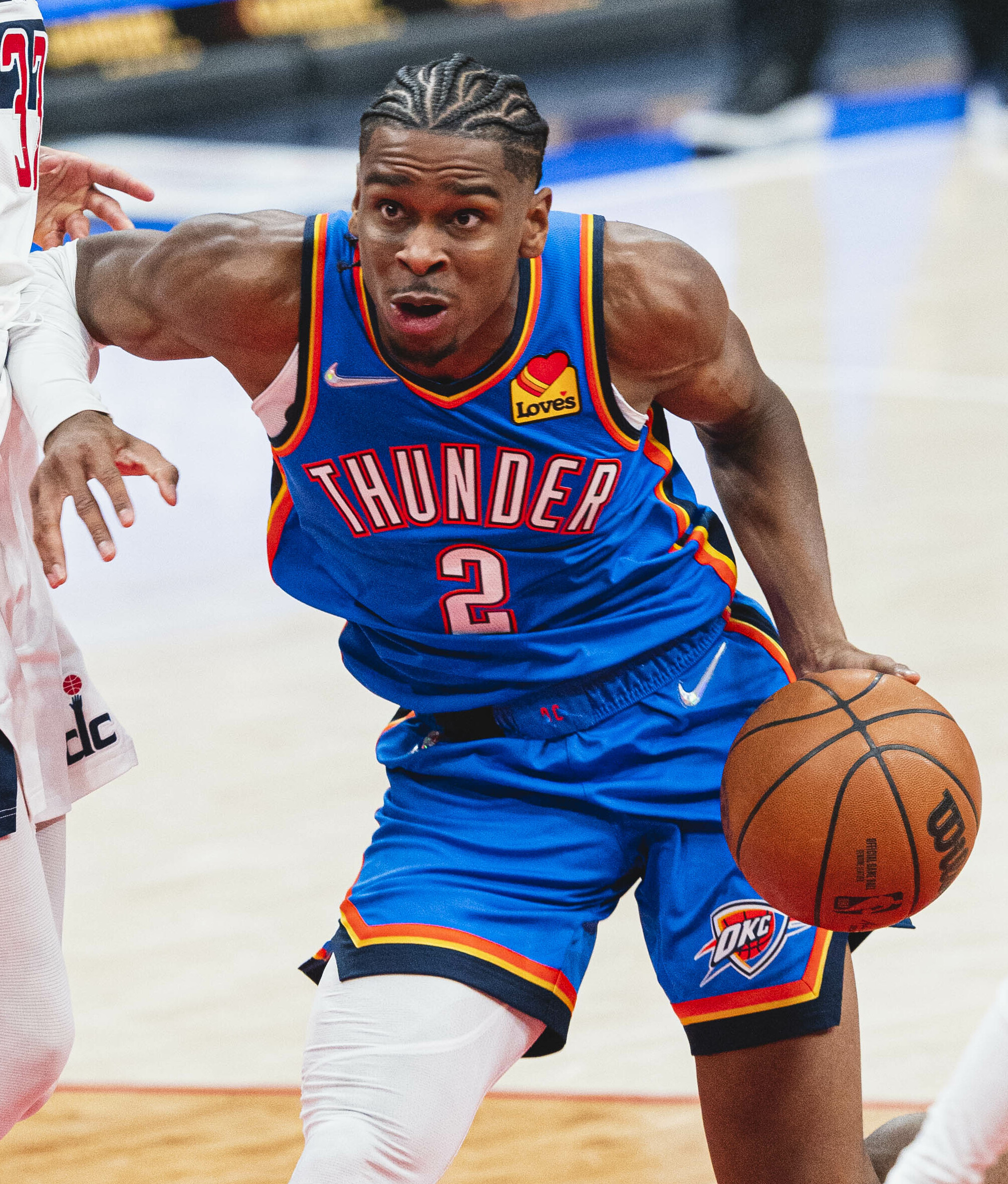
Shai Gilgeous-Alexander is the first player from Canada to win the award.

| ^ | Denotes player who is still active in the NBA |
| * | Elected to the Naismith Memorial Basketball Hall of Fame |
| ‡ | Player's team lost the NBA Finals |
| Player (#) | Denotes the number of times the player had received the Finals MVP award |
| Team (#) | Denotes the number of times a player from this team has received the Finals MVP award |
| GP | Games played |
| MPG | Minutes per game |
| PPG | Points per game |
| RPG | Rebounds per game |
| APG | Assists per game |
| STL | Steals per game |
| BLK | Blocks per game |

| Year | Player | Pos. | Nat. | Team | GP | MPG | PPG | RPG | APG | STL | BLK |
|---|---|---|---|---|---|---|---|---|---|---|---|
| 1969 | Jerry West* | G | (United States) | Los Angeles Lakers ‡ | 7 | 43.9 | 37.9 | 4.7 | 7.4 | — | — |
| 1970 | Willis Reed* | C/F | (United States) | New York Knicks | 6 | 37.7 | 23.0 | 10.5 | 2.8 | — | — |
| 1971 | Lew Alcindor* | C | (United States) | Milwaukee Bucks | 4 | 42.0 | 27.0 | 18.5 | 2.8 | — | — |
| 1972 | Wilt Chamberlain* | C | (United States) | Los Angeles Lakers (2) | 5 | 47.2 | 19.4 | 23.2 | 2.6 | — | — |
| 1973 | Willis Reed* (2) | C/F | (United States) | New York Knicks (2) | 5 | 30.0 | 16.4 | 9.2 | 2.6 | — | — |
| 1974 | John Havlicek* | F/G | (United States) | Boston Celtics | 7 | 47.1 | 26.4 | 7.7 | 4.7 | 1.9 | 0.0 |
| 1975 | Rick Barry* | F | (United States) | Golden State Warriors | 4 | 43.0 | 29.5 | 4.0 | 5.0 | 3.5 | 0.8 |
| 1976 | Jo Jo White* | G | (United States) | Boston Celtics (2) | 6 | 46.5 | 21.7 | 4.3 | 5.8 | 1.5 | 0.0 |
| 1977 | Bill Walton* | C | (United States) | Portland Trail Blazers | 6 | 37.7 | 18.5 | 19.0 | 5.2 | 1.0 | 3.7 |
| 1978 | Wes Unseld* | C/F | (United States) | Washington Bullets | 7 | 38.6 | 9.0 | 11.7 | 3.9 | 0.6 | 0.1 |
| 1979 | Dennis Johnson* | G | (United States) | Seattle SuperSonics | 5 | 44.8 | 22.6 | 6.0 | 6.0 | 1.8 | 2.2 |
| 1980 | Magic Johnson* | G | (United States) | Los Angeles Lakers (3) | 6 | 42.7 | 21.5 | 11.2 | 8.7 | 2.7 | 0.3 |
| 1981 | Cedric Maxwell | F | (United States) | Boston Celtics (3) | 6 | 37.8 | 17.7 | 9.5 | 2.8 | 0.2 | 1.0 |
| 1982 | Magic Johnson* (2) | G | (United States) | Los Angeles Lakers (4) | 6 | 41.7 | 16.2 | 10.8 | 8.0 | 2.5 | 0.3 |
| 1983 | Moses Malone* | C | (United States) | Philadelphia 76ers | 4 | 39.3 | 25.8 | 18.0 | 2.0 | 1.5 | 1.5 |
| 1984 | Larry Bird* | F | (United States) | Boston Celtics (4) | 7 | 43.6 | 27.4 | 14.0 | 3.6 | 2.1 | 1.1 |
| 1985 | Kareem Abdul-Jabbar (2) | C | (United States) | Los Angeles Lakers (5) | 6 | 35.5 | 25.7 | 9.0 | 5.2 | 1.0 | 1.5 |
| 1986 | Larry Bird* (2) | F | (United States) | Boston Celtics (5) | 6 | 44.8 | 24.0 | 9.7 | 9.5 | 2.7 | 0.3 |
| 1987 | Magic Johnson* (3) | G | (United States) | Los Angeles Lakers (6) | 6 | 39.3 | 26.2 | 8.0 | 13.0 | 2.3 | 0.3 |
| 1988 | James Worthy* | F | (United States) | Los Angeles Lakers (7) | 7 | 38.0 | 22.0 | 7.4 | 4.4 | 0.7 | 0.6 |
| 1989 | Joe Dumars* | G | (United States) | Detroit Pistons | 4 | 36.8 | 27.3 | 1.8 | 6.0 | 0.5 | 0.3 |
| 1990 | Isiah Thomas* | G | (United States) | Detroit Pistons (2) | 5 | 38.4 | 27.6 | 5.2 | 7.0 | 1.6 | 0.4 |
| 1991 | Michael Jordan* | G | (United States) | Chicago Bulls | 5 | 44.0 | 31.2 | 6.6 | 11.4 | 2.8 | 1.4 |
| 1992 | Michael Jordan* (2) | G | (United States) | Chicago Bulls (2) | 6 | 42.3 | 35.8 | 4.8 | 6.5 | 1.7 | 0.3 |
| 1993 | Michael Jordan* (3) | G | (United States) | Chicago Bulls (3) | 6 | 45.7 | 41.0 | 8.5 | 6.3 | 1.7 | 0.7 |
| 1994 | Hakeem Olajuwon* | C | (Nigeria) (Note: Hakeem Olajuwon was born in Nigeria, but became a naturalized United States citizen in 1993.) | Houston Rockets | 7 | 43.1 | 26.9 | 9.1 | 3.6 | 1.6 | 3.9 |
| 1995 | Hakeem Olajuwon* (2) | C | (Nigeria) | Houston Rockets (2) | 4 | 44.8 | 32.8 | 11.5 | 5.5 | 2.0 | 2.0 |
| 1996 | Michael Jordan* (4) | G | (United States) | Chicago Bulls (4) | 6 | 42.0 | 27.3 | 5.3 | 4.2 | 1.7 | 0.2 |
| 1997 | Michael Jordan* (5) | G | (United States) | Chicago Bulls (5) | 6 | 42.7 | 32.3 | 7.0 | 6.0 | 1.2 | 0.8 |
| 1998 | Michael Jordan* (6) | G | (United States) | Chicago Bulls (6) | 6 | 41.7 | 33.5 | 4.0 | 2.3 | 1.8 | 0.7 |
| 1999 | Tim Duncan* | F/C | (United States) (Note: Because Tim Duncan is a United States citizen by birth, as are all natives of the U.S. Virgin Islands, he was able to play for the U.S. internationally.) | San Antonio Spurs | 5 | 45.6 | 27.4 | 14.0 | 2.4 | 1.0 | 2.2 |
| 2000 | Shaquille O'Neal* | C | (United States) | Los Angeles Lakers (8) | 6 | 45.7 | 38.0 | 16.7 | 2.3 | 1.0 | 2.7 |
| 2001 | Shaquille O'Neal* (2) | C | (United States) | Los Angeles Lakers (9) | 5 | 45.0 | 33.0 | 15.8 | 4.8 | 0.4 | 3.4 |
| 2002 | Shaquille O'Neal* (3) | C | (United States) | Los Angeles Lakers (10) | 4 | 41.5 | 36.3 | 12.3 | 3.8 | 0.5 | 2.8 |
| 2003 | Tim Duncan* (2) | F/C | (United States) | San Antonio Spurs (2) | 6 | 44.0 | 24.2 | 17.0 | 5.3 | 1.0 | 5.3 |
| 2004 | Chauncey Billups* | G | (United States) | Detroit Pistons (3) | 5 | 38.8 | 21.0 | 3.2 | 5.2 | 1.2 | 0.0 |
| 2005 | Tim Duncan* (3) | F/C | (United States) | San Antonio Spurs (3) | 7 | 40.7 | 20.6 | 14.1 | 2.1 | 0.4 | 2.1 |
| 2006 | Dwyane Wade* | G | (United States) | Miami Heat | 6 | 43.5 | 34.7 | 7.8 | 3.8 | 2.7 | 1.0 |
| 2007 | Tony Parker* | G | (France) (Note: Tony Parker was born in Belgium. He holds French citizenship and played for their national team.) | San Antonio Spurs (4) | 4 | 37.8 | 24.5 | 5.0 | 3.3 | 0.8 | 0.0 |
| 2008 | Paul Pierce* | F | (United States) | Boston Celtics (6) | 6 | 38.8 | 21.8 | 4.5 | 6.3 | 1.2 | 0.3 |
| 2009 | Kobe Bryant* | G | (United States) | Los Angeles Lakers (11) | 5 | 43.8 | 32.4 | 5.6 | 7.4 | 1.4 | 1.4 |
| 2010 | Kobe Bryant* (2) | G | (United States) | Los Angeles Lakers (12) | 7 | 41.1 | 28.6 | 8.0 | 3.9 | 2.1 | 0.7 |
| 2011 | Dirk Nowitzki* | F | (Germany) | Dallas Mavericks | 6 | 40.3 | 26.0 | 9.7 | 2.0 | 0.7 | 0.7 |
| 2012 | LeBron James^ | F | (United States) | Miami Heat (2) | 5 | 44.0 | 28.6 | 10.2 | 7.4 | 1.6 | 0.4 |
| 2013 | LeBron James^ (2) | F | (United States) | Miami Heat (3) | 7 | 43.0 | 25.3 | 10.9 | 7.0 | 2.3 | 0.9 |
| 2014 | Kawhi Leonard^ | F | (United States) | San Antonio Spurs (5) | 5 | 33.4 | 17.8 | 6.4 | 2.0 | 1.6 | 1.2 |
| 2015 | Andre Iguodala | F/G | (United States) | Golden State Warriors (2) | 6 | 37.0 | 16.3 | 5.8 | 4.0 | 1.3 | 0.3 |
| 2016 | LeBron James^ (3) | F | (United States) | Cleveland Cavaliers | 7 | 41.7 | 29.7 | 11.3 | 8.9 | 2.6 | 2.3 |
| 2017 | Kevin Durant^ | F | (United States) | Golden State Warriors (3) | 5 | 39.8 | 35.2 | 8.2 | 5.4 | 1.0 | 1.6 |
| 2018 | Kevin Durant^ (2) | F | (United States) | Golden State Warriors (4) | 4 | 41.3 | 28.8 | 10.8 | 7.5 | 0.8 | 2.3 |
| 2019 | Kawhi Leonard^ (2) | F | (United States) | Toronto Raptors | 6 | 40.5 | 28.5 | 9.8 | 4.2 | 2.0 | 1.2 |
| 2020 | LeBron James^ (4) | F | (United States) | Los Angeles Lakers (13) | 6 | 39.3 | 29.8 | 11.8 | 8.5 | 1.2 | 0.5 |
| 2021 | Giannis Antetokounmpo^ | F | (Greece) | Milwaukee Bucks (2) | 6 | 39.8 | 35.2 | 13.2 | 5.0 | 1.2 | 1.8 |
| 2022 | Stephen Curry^ | G | (United States) | Golden State Warriors (5) | 6 | 37.5 | 31.2 | 6.0 | 5.0 | 2.0 | 0.2 |
| 2023 | Nikola Jokić^ | C | (Serbia) | Denver Nuggets | 5 | 41.2 | 30.2 | 14.0 | 7.2 | 0.8 | 1.4 |
| 2024 | Jaylen Brown^ | F/G | (United States) | Boston Celtics (7) | 5 | 38.6 | 20.8 | 5.4 | 5.0 | 1.6 | 0.8 |
| 2025 | Shai Gilgeous-Alexander^ | G | (Canada) | Oklahoma City Thunder (2) | 7 | 38.1 | 30.3 | 4.6 | 5.6 | 1.9 | 1.6 |
| 2026 | Jalen Brunson^ | G | (United States) | New York Knicks (3) | 5 | 39.2 | 32.6 | 4.2 | 4.6 | 2.0 | 0.0 |

== Multi-time winners ==
| Awards | Player | Team(s) | Years |
|---|---|---|---|
| 6 | (United States) Michael Jordan | Chicago Bulls | 1991, 1992, 1993, 1996, 1997, 1998 |
| 4 | (United States) LeBron James | Miami Heat (2), Cleveland Cavaliers, Los Angeles Lakers | 2012, 2013, 2016, 2020 |
| 3 | (United States) Magic Johnson | Los Angeles Lakers | 1980, 1982, 1987 |
| 3 | (United States) Shaquille O'Neal | Los Angeles Lakers | 2000, 2001, 2002 |
| 3 | (United States) Tim Duncan | San Antonio Spurs | 1999, 2003, 2005 |
| 2 | (United States) Willis Reed | New York Knicks | 1970, 1973 |
| 2 | (United States) Kareem Abdul-Jabbar | Milwaukee Bucks, Los Angeles Lakers | 1971, 1985 |
| 2 | (United States) Larry Bird | Boston Celtics | 1984, 1986 |
| 2 | (Nigeria) Hakeem Olajuwon | Houston Rockets | 1994, 1995 |
| 2 | (United States) Kobe Bryant | Los Angeles Lakers | 2009, 2010 |
| 2 | (United States) Kevin Durant | Golden State Warriors | 2017, 2018 |
| 2 | (United States) Kawhi Leonard | San Antonio Spurs, Toronto Raptors | 2014, 2019 |

== Teams ==
| Awards | Teams | Years |
|---|---|---|
| 13 | Los Angeles Lakers | 1969, 1972, 1980, 1982, 1985, 1987, 1988, 2000, 2001, 2002, 2009, 2010, 2020 |
| 7 | Boston Celtics | 1974, 1976, 1981, 1984, 1986, 2008, 2024 |
| 6 | Chicago Bulls | 1991, 1992, 1993, 1996, 1997, 1998 |
| 5 | San Antonio Spurs | 1999, 2003, 2005, 2007, 2014 |
| 5 | Golden State Warriors | 1975, 2015, 2017, 2018, 2022 |
| 3 | Detroit Pistons | 1989, 1990, 2004 |
| 3 | Miami Heat | 2006, 2012, 2013 |
| 3 | New York Knicks | 1970, 1973, 2026 |
| 2 | Houston Rockets | 1994, 1995 |
| 2 | Milwaukee Bucks | 1971, 2021 |
| 2 | Oklahoma City Thunder (Note: Includes championships as Seattle SuperSonics) | 1979, 2025 |
| 1 | Portland Trail Blazers | 1977 |
| 1 | Washington Bullets | 1978 |
| 1 | Philadelphia 76ers | 1983 |
| 1 | Dallas Mavericks | 2011 |
| 1 | Cleveland Cavaliers | 2016 |
| 1 | Toronto Raptors | 2019 |
| 1 | Denver Nuggets | 2023 |
| 0 | Atlanta Hawks | None |
| 0 | Brooklyn Nets | None |
| 0 | Charlotte Hornets | None |
| 0 | Indiana Pacers | None |
| 0 | Los Angeles Clippers | None |
| 0 | Memphis Grizzlies | None |
| 0 | Minnesota Timberwolves | None |
| 0 | New Orleans Pelicans | None |
| 0 | Orlando Magic | None |
| 0 | Phoenix Suns | None |
| 0 | Sacramento Kings | None |
| 0 | Utah Jazz | None |

== By country ==
| Awards | Country | Years |
|---|---|---|
| 51 | United States | 1969–1993, 1996–2006, 2008–2010, 2012–2020, 2022, 2024, 2026 |
| 2 | Nigeria | 1994, 1995 |
| 1 | France | 2007 |
| 1 | Germany | 2011 |
| 1 | Greece | 2021 |
| 1 | Serbia | 2023 |
| 1 | Canada | 2025 |

== See also ==
- NBA Most Valuable Player
- NBA Conference Finals Most Valuable Player Award
- NBA All-Star Game Kobe Bryant Most Valuable Player Award
