= Squatch =

Mascot of the Seattle SuperSonics of the NBA

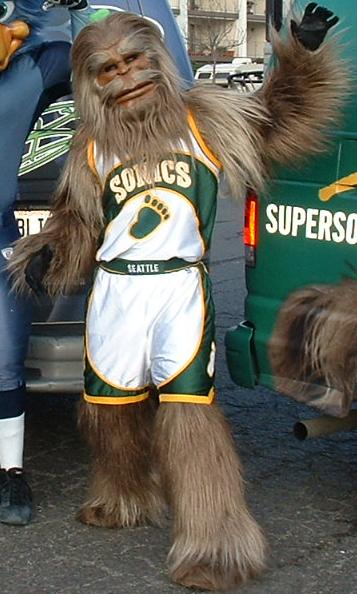
Squatch in 2005.

Squatch (a derivation of Sasquatch) was the team mascot for the Seattle SuperSonics, a National Basketball Association (NBA) franchise formerly based in Seattle, Washington. Between his 1993 debut and the team's relocation to Oklahoma City, Oklahoma, in 2008, Squatch appeared at more than 175 events annually, and was with the organization during their run to the 1996 NBA Finals.

In 2007, Chris Ballew of the rock band The Presidents of the United States of America wrote and performed a song about the mascot. That same year, Squatch attempted to set a world record with a jump of 30 feet on inline skates, over vehicles owned by NBA players Ray Allen and Robert Swift.

The biography of the Edmonton Rush Lacrosse Club's yeti mascot, Slush, describes a history wherein the two characters grew up together in the Cascade Mountains. Squatch appeared during the Rush's inaugural game to "teach" Slush how to be a professional mascot.

Following the SuperSonics' move to Oklahoma City, the character was retired, and remains part of the intellectual property (name, colors, etc.) that the city of Seattle retained as part of the KeyArena lease settlement. The character's performer from 1999 to 2008 (Marc Taylor) remains under contract with the relocated team, currently performing as Rumble the Bison, the Thunder's mascot.
