= Benny the Bull =

Mascot for the NBA's Chicago Bulls

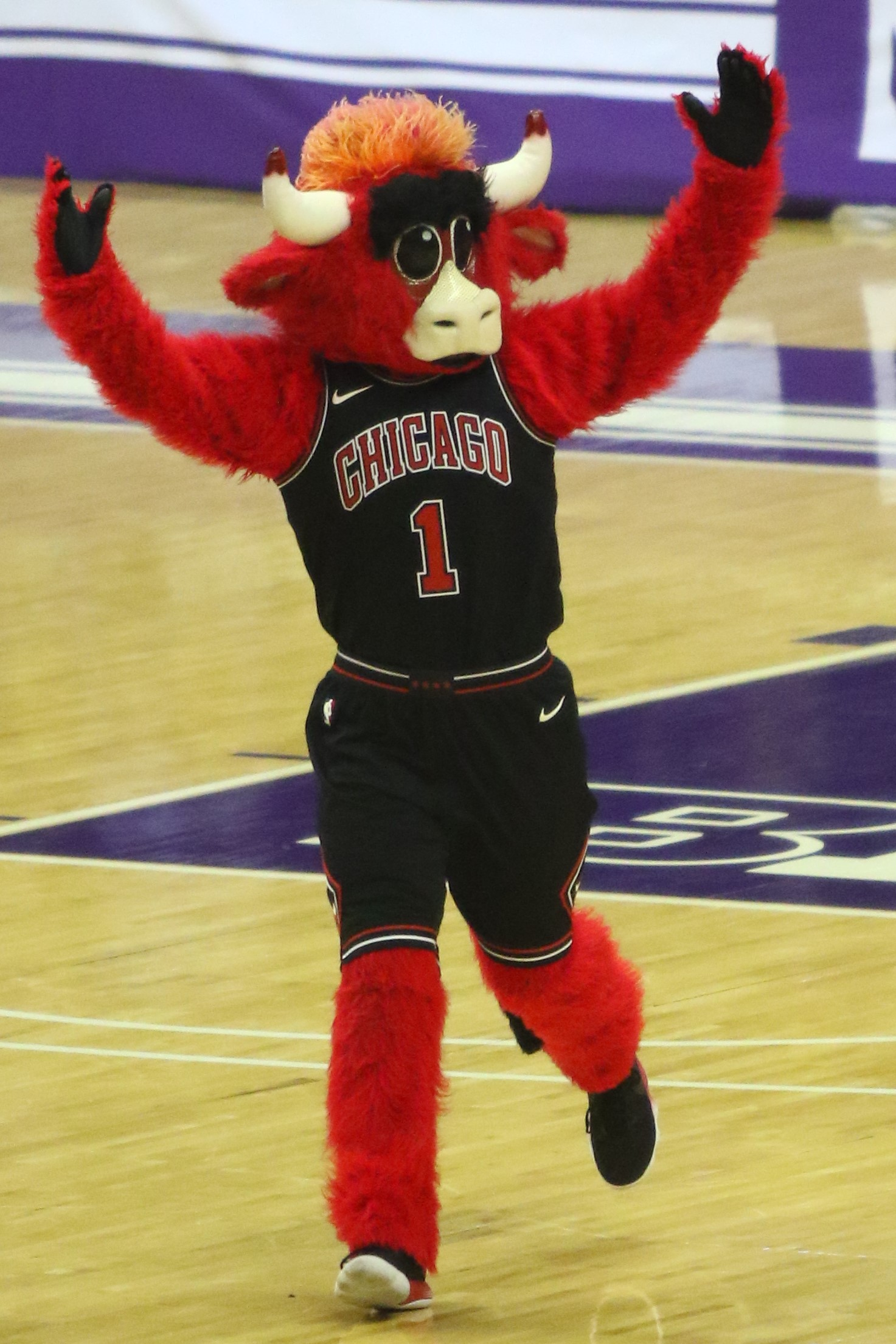
Benny the Bull in 2018.

Benny the Bull, commonly known as Benny, is the mascot of the National Basketball Association (NBA)'s Chicago Bulls, a role he has filled since 1969.

== Biography / retired versions ==
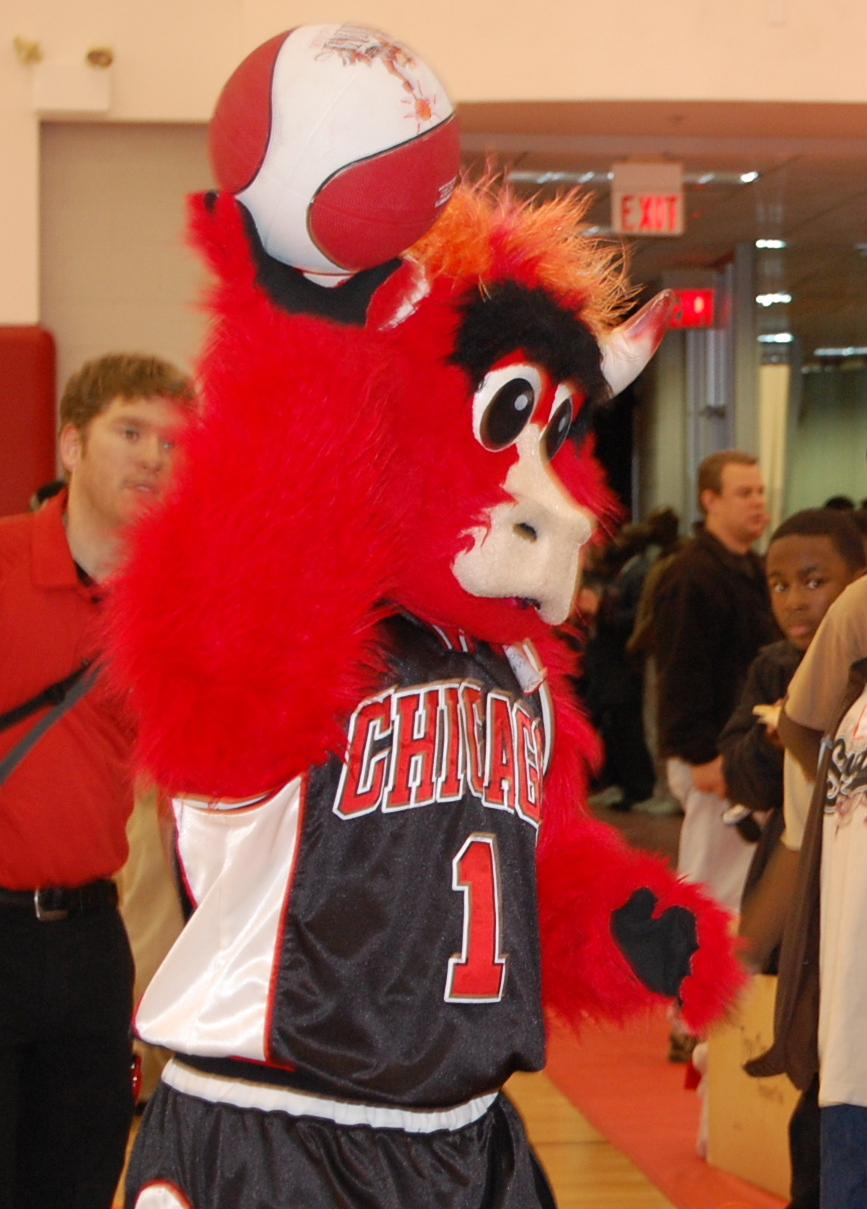
Benny the Bull in 2008.

Benjamin T. "Benny" Bull, has been the mascot of the Chicago Bulls for more than 50 years first at Chicago Stadium (1969–1994), and now at the United Center (1994–present). He has become just as popular as some of the franchise's most notable figures, such as players Michael Jordan, Scottie Pippen, Dennis Rodman, and head coach Phil Jackson. Benny is one of the longest-tenured mascots in the NBA and in all of professional sports. Benny was named after Ben Bentley, the Bull's first Public Relations Manager and Stadium Announcer. Benny was one of the promotional tools general manager Pat Williams employed to boost the Bulls' arena entertainment and attendance.

The current and most popular Benny has had many "relatives" or family members over the years. His great-grandfather, in the late 1960s, was the first NBA mascot. Along with Dick Motta and Jerry Sloan, he was ejected by Earl Strom for interfering with the action on the court in the Bulls' 113–90 loss in Game 3 of the NBA Western Conference Finals at the Milwaukee Arena on April 20, 1974. Many other variations/family members of the bull were passed on to different ones, including Benny's chubby predecessor (or father) in the 1990s. A slim, dunking bull mascot named "Da Bull" was added at the time. According to an article on the Bulls' website: "Da Bull is Benny the Bull's cousin, and he made his first appearance at a Bulls game during the 1995–96 season. That is why his uniform number is 95. Among Da Bull's many talents are tumbling, gymnastics, playing basketball, break dancing, reading, officiating basketball games, and most importantly, performing his signature slam dunks. Da Bull does not have a tail like other Bulls. He lost his tail while practicing his amazing dunks at the United Center. By not having a tail, Da Bull has been able to perform even more slam dunks and tumbling because his long, skinny tail no longer gets in the way. An injury to his hoof during the 1999–2000 Bulls season sidelined Da Bull briefly, but he returned to the trampoline after a short recovery period." His performer, Chester Brewer, was arrested in 2004 for illegally selling marijuana from his car, therefore retiring the mascot.

== Current Benny ==
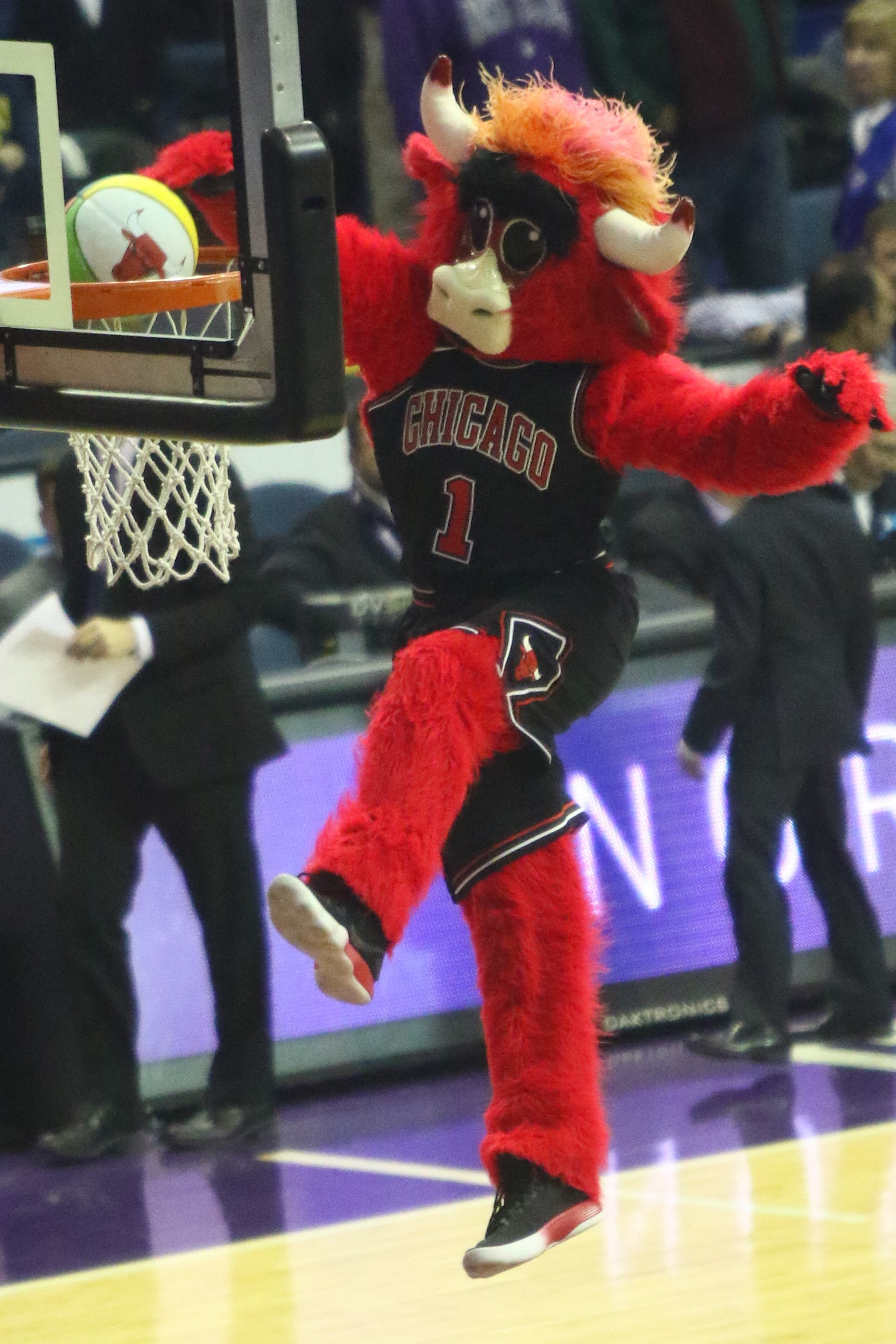
Benny the Bull in action in 2018

In 2004, the current version of Benny The Bull was introduced. He has been acclaimed as one of the most popular mascots of all time, including being named the most popular mascot in sports by Forbes in 2013.

The modern version of Benny is famous for his impressive dancing, aerobatic flips and jumps, multiple dunking tricks, giant popcorn spilling, rappelling from the United Center rafters, shooting backwards halfcourt shots, banging on his drum, using multiple cans of silly string, interacting with crowds, instances of taunting opposing players (most notably his act of tearing off the pants of others' pre-game warm up outfits), driving his bike down stairs, throwing cakes, shooting T-shirts out of his "Bullzooka", and more. He usually performs trampoline dunks alongside his team "Benny and the Elevators" His current "family" consists of two inflatable mascots named "Big Ben" and "Benji". (Benji has a similar appearance to "Lil' Benny", who used to appear alongside Benny on the court and in videos. Lil' Benny's overall design was based on the 1990s Benny).

Benny's antics have gotten him worldwide attention and recognition. He's also been seen alongside multiple celebrities, from messing with Justin Bieber or performing the "Single Ladies" dance in front of Jay-Z In addition to performing stunts and entertaining the crowd at Bulls games, Benny also makes public appearances around the Chicago area on behalf of the team. Benny made approximately 250 appearances per year. As a member of the Bulls' All-Star Reading Team, he appeared at schools to promote literacy and the importance of a good education. He could also be booked for private events. Benny had also worked as a mascot on individual dates for other professional sports franchises, such as the Billings Outlaws. He usually travels around in his van, 'Benny's Bull Ride™' and is almost always with his assistant, Todd Abbott.

Barry Anderson, after 12 years of taking on the role of Benny, announced that he would be retiring on June 30, 2016, to take on other interests, although Benny won't disappear entirely.

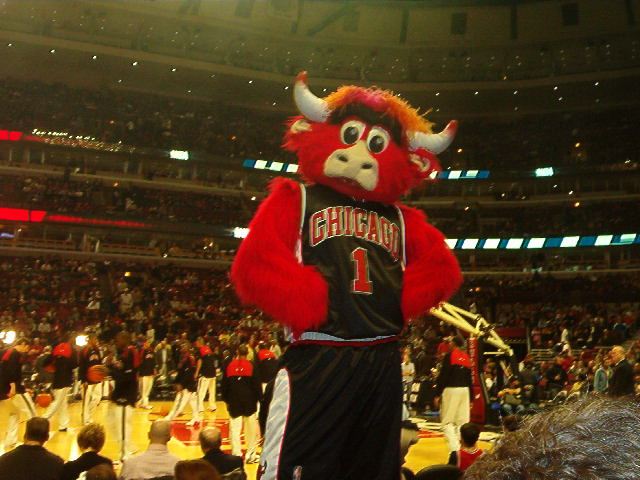
Benny the Bull in 2003.

The Bulls redesigned the Benny character in 2004 just for him after his impressive talents were awarded twice in the Capital One Mascot Challenge for his previous role, Monte from the University of Montana.

== Appearance ==
Benny has bright red fur with large eyes, a tan snout, a black bushy unibrow, horns with red tips, orange and pink hair, a long red tail and black gloves with red fur on the back. Benny wears an authentic uniform (road red/black and home whites) and team-appointed athletic shoes. His jersey bears the name "Benny" above the number "99" on the back. Benny previously wore the number 1 jersey, until the Bulls retired it in 2026 for Derrick Rose. From 2004 to modern times, the pupils of his eyes have gotten larger. Benny sports several different costumes based on the theme of the game as well as his overall "mood". His collection consists of a traditional Santa suit, a Latin/salsa suit, a black and a white tuxedo for classy events, a grim reaper hood, multiple plaid jackets, a green version of the regular uniform along with a leprechaun outfit for St. Patrick's day (that also comes with his red fur switched to green, or for a recycling campaign), Elvis Presley garb, and a large amount of other appearances.

== In other media ==
Benny was one of the many secret characters featured in the video game NBA Jam Tournament Edition. Along with him, three other NBA mascots appear in the game: the Phoenix Suns Gorilla, Charlotte Hornets' Hugo and Minnesota Timberwolves' Crunch.

The late punk musician Wesley Willis did a song about him called "Benny the Bull".

A Benny the Bull plush can be seen in the Bulls' office during the first episode of the HBO series Winning Time: The Rise of the Lakers Dynasty during the scene which depicts the coin toss between the Bulls and Los Angeles Lakers for the first pick in the 1979 NBA draft.

Benny appeared at the 1998 Kids' Choice Awards after the Chicago Bulls won Favorite Sports Team.
