= Skyhawk (mascot) =

Skyhawk is the name of one of the former mascots for the Atlanta Hawks professional basketball team in the NBA. He is an anthropomorphic hawk wearing basketball shorts, a nylon body suit and mask, and wrestling boots. He debuted in 1996. During a break in action in every game he performed acrobatic slam dunks with the aid of a small trampoline. Skyhawk ceased appearing during the 2013–14 Atlanta Hawks season after he tore his ACL during a mid-game show at a timeout break.

On February 21, 2019, the Hawks announced that their NBA G League affiliate would be named the College Park Skyhawks in reference to the former mascot.
