= List of NBA career games played leaders =

This is a list of basketball players who are the leaders in career regular season games played in the National Basketball Association (NBA). (Note: Does not include NBA playoff games or games played in the American Basketball Association for players who played in the ABA prior to merging with the NBA.)

== Games played leaders ==
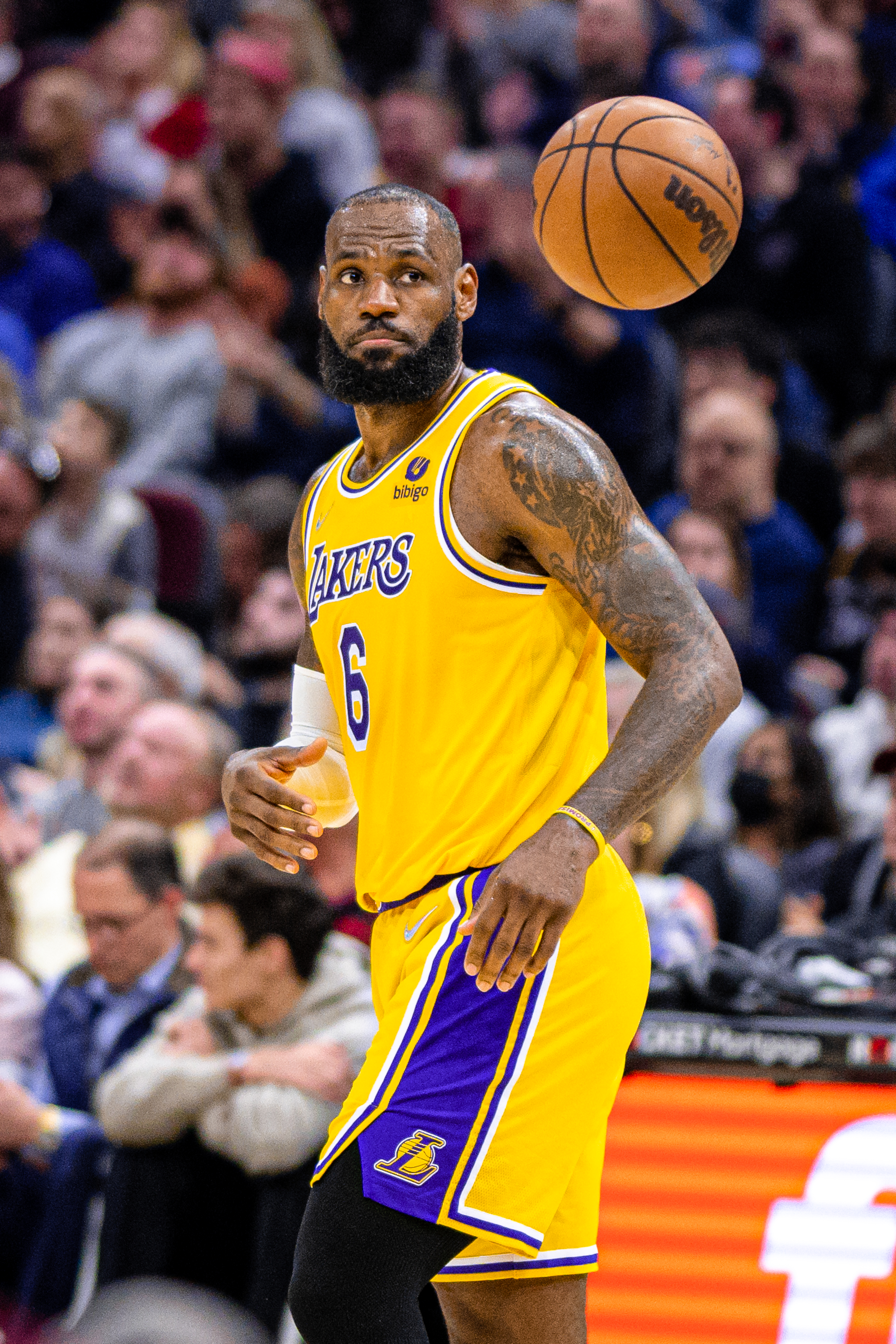
LeBron James has played the most regular season games in NBA history.

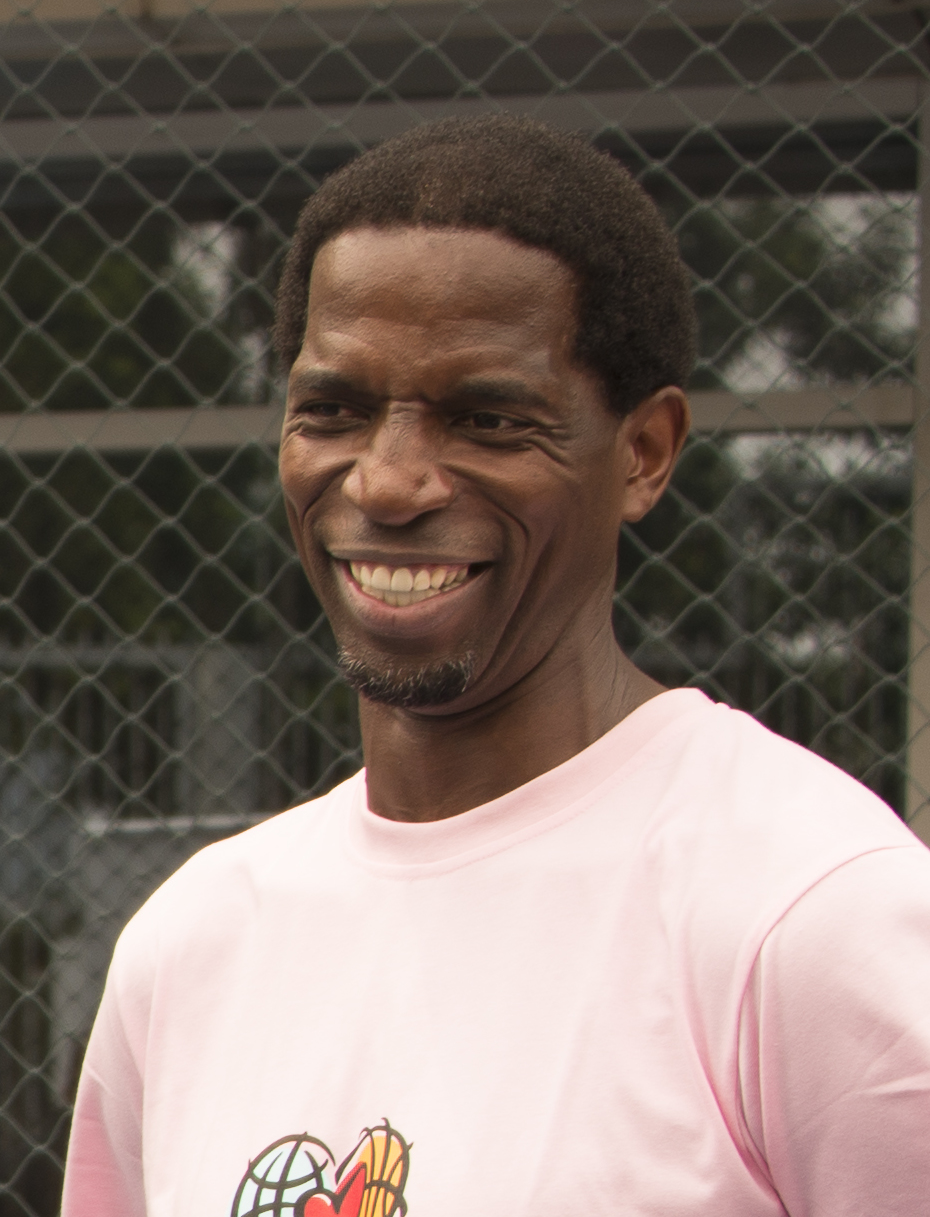
A. C. Green played 1,278 regular season games, including an NBA record 1,192 consecutive games.

Statistics accurate as of November 20, 2026.

| ^ | Active NBA player |
| * | Inducted into the Naismith Memorial Basketball Hall of Fame |
| † | Not yet eligible for Hall of Fame consideration (Note: A player is not eligible for induction into the Naismith Memorial Basketball Hall of Fame until he has been fully retired for two calendar years.) |

Career leaders
| Rank | Player | Pos | Team(s) (Note: Listed in order of the player's career. Repeated teams indicate multiple stints with that team.) | Seasons (Note: For active players, the number listed is the number of seasons that player has completed plus the current season.) | Games played |
|---|---|---|---|---|---|
| 1 | LeBron James^ | SF | Cleveland Cavaliers (2003–2010, 2014–2018); Miami Heat (2010–2014); Los Angeles Lakers (2018–2026); Philadelphia 76ers (2026–present) | 24 | 1,634 |
| 2 | Robert Parish* | C | Golden State Warriors (1976–1980); Boston Celtics (1980–1994); Charlotte Hornets (1994–1996); Chicago Bulls (1996–1997) | 21 | 1,611 |
| 3 | Kareem Abdul-Jabbar* | C | Milwaukee Bucks (1969–1975); Los Angeles Lakers (1975–1989) | 20 | 1,560 |
| 4 | Vince Carter* | SG/SF | Toronto Raptors (1998–2004); New Jersey Nets (2004–2009); Orlando Magic (2009–2010); Phoenix Suns (2010–2011); Dallas Mavericks (2011–2014); Memphis Grizzlies (2014–2017); Sacramento Kings (2017–2018); Atlanta Hawks (2018–2020) | 22 | 1,541 |
| 5 | Dirk Nowitzki* | PF | Dallas Mavericks (1998–2019) | 21 | 1,522 |
| 6 | John Stockton* | PG | Utah Jazz (1984–2003) | 19 | 1,504 |
| 7 | Karl Malone* | PF | Utah Jazz (1985–2003); Los Angeles Lakers (2003–2004) | 19 | 1,476 |
| 8 | Kevin Garnett* | PF | Minnesota Timberwolves (1995–2007, 2015–2016); Boston Celtics (2007–2013); Brooklyn Nets (2013–2015) | 21 | 1,462 |
| 9 | Kevin Willis | PF/C | Atlanta Hawks (1984–1994, 2004–2005); Miami Heat (1994–1996); Golden State Warriors (1996); Houston Rockets (1996–1998, 2001–2002); Toronto Raptors (1999–2001); Denver Nuggets (2001); San Antonio Spurs (2002–2004); Dallas Mavericks (2007) | 21 | 1,424 |
| 10 | Jason Terry | SG/PG | Atlanta Hawks (1998–2004); Dallas Mavericks (2004–2012); Boston Celtics (2012–2013); Brooklyn Nets (2013–2014); Houston Rockets (2014–2016); Milwaukee Bucks (2016–2018) | 19 | 1,410 |
| 11 | Tim Duncan* | PF/C | San Antonio Spurs (1997–2016) | 19 | 1,392 |
| 12 | Jason Kidd* | PG | Dallas Mavericks (1994–1996, 2008–2012); Phoenix Suns (1996–2001); New Jersey Nets (2001–2008); New York Knicks (2012–2013) | 19 | 1,391 |
| 13 | Reggie Miller* | SG | Indiana Pacers (1987–2005) | 18 | 1,389 |
| 14 | Clifford Robinson | PF/SF | Portland Trail Blazers (1989–1997); Phoenix Suns (1997–2001); Detroit Pistons (2001–2003); Golden State Warriors (2003–2005); New Jersey Nets (2005–2007) | 18 | 1,380 |
| 15 | Chris Paul^{†} | PG | New Orleans Hornets (2005–2011); Los Angeles Clippers (2011–2017, 2025); Houston Rockets (2017–2019); Oklahoma City Thunder (2019–2020); Phoenix Suns (2020–2023); Golden State Warriors (2023–2024); San Antonio Spurs (2024–2025) | 21 | 1,370 |
| 16 | Kobe Bryant* | SG | Los Angeles Lakers (1996–2016) | 20 | 1,346 |
| 17 | Paul Pierce* | SF/SG | Boston Celtics (1998–2013); Brooklyn Nets (2013–2014); Washington Wizards (2014–2015); Los Angeles Clippers (2015–2017) | 19 | 1,343 |
| 18 | Gary Payton* | PG | Seattle SuperSonics (1990–2003); Milwaukee Bucks (2003); Los Angeles Lakers (2003–2004); Boston Celtics (2004–2005); Miami Heat (2005–2007) | 17 | 1,335 |
| 19 | Moses Malone* | C | Buffalo Braves (1976); Houston Rockets (1976–1982); Philadelphia 76ers (1982–1986, 1993–1994); Washington Bullets (1986–1988); Atlanta Hawks (1988–1991); Milwaukee Bucks (1991–1993); San Antonio Spurs (1994–1995) | 19 | 1,329 |
| 20 | Jamal Crawford | SG | Chicago Bulls (2000–2004); New York Knicks (2004–2008); Golden State Warriors (2008–2009); Atlanta Hawks (2009–2011); Portland Trail Blazers (2011–2012); Los Angeles Clippers (2012–2017); Minnesota Timberwolves (2017–2018); Phoenix Suns (2018–2019); Brooklyn Nets (2020) | 20 | 1,327 |
| 21 | Buck Williams | PF | New Jersey Nets (1981–1989); Portland Trail Blazers (1989–1996); New York Knicks (1996–1998) | 17 | 1,307 |
| 22 | Andre Miller | PG | Cleveland Cavaliers (1999–2002); Los Angeles Clippers (2002–2003); Denver Nuggets (2003–2006, 2011–2014); Philadelphia 76ers (2006–2009); Portland Trail Blazers (2009–2011); Washington Wizards (2014–2015); Sacramento Kings (2015); Minnesota Timberwolves (2015–2016); San Antonio Spurs (2016) | 17 | 1,304 |
| 23 | Elvin Hayes* | PF/C | San Diego/Houston Rockets (1968–1972, 1981–1984); Baltimore/Capital/Washington Bullets (1972–1981) | 16 | 1,303 |
| 24 | Russell Westbrook^{†} | PG | Oklahoma City Thunder (2008–2019); Houston Rockets (2019–2020); Washington Wizards (2020–2021); Los Angeles Lakers (2021–2023); Los Angeles Clippers (2023–2024); Denver Nuggets (2024–2025); Sacramento Kings (2025–2026) | 18 | 1,301 |
| 25 | Ray Allen* | SG | Milwaukee Bucks (1996–2003); Seattle SuperSonics (2003–2007); Boston Celtics (2007–2012); Miami Heat (2012–2014) | 18 | 1,300 |
| 26 | Mark Jackson | PG | New York Knicks (1987–1992, 2001–2002); Los Angeles Clippers (1992–1994); Indiana Pacers (1994–1996, 1997–2000); Denver Nuggets (1996–1997); Toronto Raptors (2000–2001); Utah Jazz (2002–2003); Houston Rockets (2003–2004) | 17 | 1,296 |
| 27 | Derek Fisher | PG | Los Angeles Lakers (1996–2004, 2007–2012); Golden State Warriors (2004–2006); Utah Jazz (2006–2007); Oklahoma City Thunder (2012, 2013–2014); Dallas Mavericks (2012) | 18 | 1,287 |
| 28 | Sam Perkins | PF | Dallas Mavericks (1984–1990); Los Angeles Lakers (1990–1993); Seattle SuperSonics (1993–1998); Indiana Pacers (1999–2001) | 17 | 1,286 |
| 29 | Charles Oakley | PF | Chicago Bulls (1985–1988, 2001–2002); New York Knicks (1988–1998); Toronto Raptors (1998–2001); Washington Wizards (2002–2003); Houston Rockets (2004) | 19 | 1,282 |
| 30 | A. C. Green | PF | Los Angeles Lakers (1985–1993, 1999–2000); Phoenix Suns (1993–1996); Dallas Mavericks (1996–1999); Miami Heat (2000–2001) | 16 | 1,278 |
| 31 | DeMar DeRozan^ | SG/SF | Toronto Raptors (2009–2018); San Antonio Spurs (2018–2021); Chicago Bulls (2021–2024); Sacramento Kings (2024–2026); Denver Nuggets (2026–present) | 18 | 1,277 |
| 31 | Joe Johnson | SG/SF | Boston Celtics (2001–2002, 2021–2022); Phoenix Suns (2002–2005); Atlanta Hawks (2005–2012); Brooklyn Nets (2012–2016); Miami Heat (2016); Utah Jazz (2016–2018); Houston Rockets (2018) | 18 | 1,277 |
| 33 | Terry Porter | PG | Portland Trail Blazers (1985–1995); Minnesota Timberwolves (1995–1998); Miami Heat (1999); San Antonio Spurs (1999–2002) | 17 | 1,274 |
| 34 | John Havlicek* | SF/SG | Boston Celtics (1962–1978) | 16 | 1,270 |
| 35 | Carmelo Anthony* | SF | Denver Nuggets (2003–2011); New York Knicks (2011–2017); Oklahoma City Thunder (2017–2018); Houston Rockets (2018–2019); Portland Trail Blazers (2019–2021); Los Angeles Lakers (2021–2022) | 19 | 1,260 |
| 36 | Otis Thorpe | PF | Kansas City/Sacramento Kings (1984–1988, 1998); Houston Rockets (1988–1995); Portland Trail Blazers (1995); Detroit Pistons (1995–1997); Vancouver Grizzlies (1997–1998); Washington Wizards (1998–1999); Miami Heat (1999–2000); Charlotte Hornets (2000–2001) | 17 | 1,257 |
| 37 | Paul Silas | PF | St. Louis/Atlanta Hawks (1964–1969); Phoenix Suns (1969–1972); Boston Celtics (1972–1976); Denver Nuggets (1976–1977); Seattle SuperSonics (1977–1980) | 16 | 1,254 |
| 37 | Tony Parker* | PG | San Antonio Spurs (2001–2018); Charlotte Hornets (2018–2019) | 18 | 1,254 |
| 39 | Jeff Green^{†} | PF/SF | Seattle SuperSonics/Oklahoma City Thunder (2007–2011); Boston Celtics (2011, 2012–2015); Memphis Grizzlies (2015–2016); Los Angeles Clippers (2016); Orlando Magic (2016–2017); Cleveland Cavaliers (2017–2018); Washington Wizards (2018–2019); Utah Jazz (2019); Houston Rockets (2020, 2023–2026); Brooklyn Nets (2020–2021); Denver Nuggets (2021–2023) | 18 | 1,247 |
| 40 | Dwight Howard* | C | Orlando Magic (2004–2012); Los Angeles Lakers (2012–2013, 2019–2020, 2021–2022); Houston Rockets (2013–2016); Atlanta Hawks (2016–2017); Charlotte Hornets (2017–2018); Washington Wizards (2018–2019); Philadelphia 76ers (2020–2021) | 18 | 1,242 |
| 41 | Hakeem Olajuwon* | C | Houston Rockets (1984–2001); Toronto Raptors (2001–2002) | 18 | 1,238 |
| 42 | James Harden^ | SG/PG | Oklahoma City Thunder (2009–2012); Houston Rockets (2012–2021); Brooklyn Nets (2021–2022); Philadelphia 76ers (2022–2023); Los Angeles Clippers (2023–2026); Cleveland Cavaliers (2026–present) | 18 | 1,237 |
| 43 | Kyle Korver | SG/SF | Philadelphia 76ers (2003–2007); Utah Jazz (2007–2010, 2018–2019); Chicago Bulls (2010–2012); Atlanta Hawks (2012–2017); Cleveland Cavaliers (2017–2018); Milwaukee Bucks (2019–2020) | 17 | 1,232 |
| 44 | Andre Iguodala | SF/SG | Philadelphia 76ers (2004–2012); Denver Nuggets (2012–2013); Golden State Warriors (2013–2019, 2021–2023); Miami Heat (2020–2021) | 19 | 1,231 |
| 45 | Mike Conley^ | PG | Memphis Grizzlies (2007–2019); Utah Jazz (2019–2023); Minnesota Timberwolves (2023–2026); Boston Celtics (2026–present) | 20 | 1,230 |
| 46 | Pau Gasol* | PF/C | Memphis Grizzlies (2001–2008); Los Angeles Lakers (2008–2014); Chicago Bulls (2014–2016); San Antonio Spurs (2016–2019); Milwaukee Bucks (2019) | 18 | 1,226 |
| 47 | Kevin Durant^ | SF/PF | Seattle SuperSonics/Oklahoma City Thunder (2007–2016); Golden State Warriors (2016–2019); Brooklyn Nets (2019–2023); Phoenix Suns (2023–2025); Houston Rockets (2025–present) | 19 | 1,218 |
| 48 | Steve Nash* | PG | Phoenix Suns (1996–1998, 2004–2012); Dallas Mavericks (1998–2004); Los Angeles Lakers (2012–2015) | 19 | 1,217 |
| 49 | Dale Ellis | SF/SG | Dallas Mavericks (1983–1986); Seattle SuperSonics (1986–1991, 1997–1999); Milwaukee Bucks (1991–1992, 1999–2000); San Antonio Spurs (1992–1994); Denver Nuggets (1994–1997); Charlotte Hornets (2000) | 17 | 1,209 |
| 50 | Juwan Howard | PF | Washington Bullets/Wizards (1994–2001); Dallas Mavericks (2001–2002, 2007–2008); Denver Nuggets (2002–2003, 2008); Orlando Magic (2003–2004); Houston Rockets (2004–2007); Charlotte Bobcats (2008–2009); Portland Trail Blazers (2009–2010); Miami Heat (2010–2013) | 19 | 1,208 |

== See also ==
- List of NBA regular season records
- List of NBA career minutes played leaders
- List of NBA seasons played leaders
- List of NBA players who have spent their entire career with one franchise
- List of oldest and youngest NBA players
