= List of NFL players who spent their entire career with one franchise =

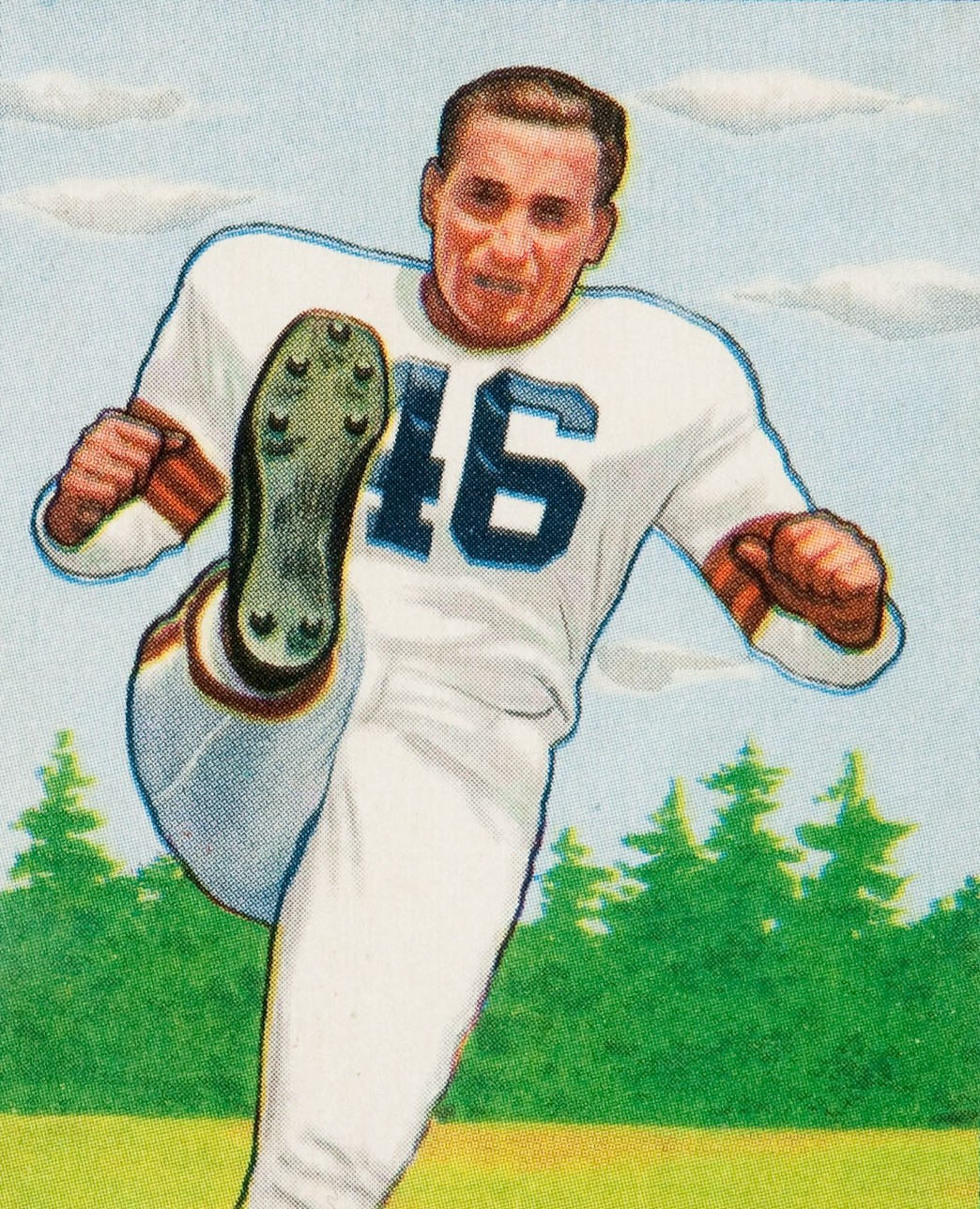
Lou Groza shares the record for most seasons with a single franchise at 21.

The National Football League is a professional American football league consisting of 32 teams, divided equally between the National Football Conference (NFC) and the American Football Conference (AFC). The NFL is one of the four major professional sports leagues in North America, and the highest professional level of American football in the world.

This list include the players have spent the most seasons in their entire NFL career with one franchise (minimum 15 seasons). Each player has played at least one game in fifteen different NFL seasons for a single NFL franchise. The seasons are not necessarily consecutive. Time playing on amateur teams or teams out of the NFL are not considered. A franchise may change its location and/or name, but players would be considered to be part of the same franchise.

Some notable players who have been disqualified from this list are Tom Brady (who spent his first 20 seasons playing for the New England Patriots before signing with the Tampa Bay Buccaneers in 2020), Sebastian Janikowski (who spent his first 18 seasons with the Oakland Raiders before signing with the Seattle Seahawks in 2018), Aaron Rodgers (who spent his first 18 seasons playing for the Green Bay Packers before being traded to the New York Jets in 2023 after a trade request), Johnny Unitas (who spent his first 17 seasons with the Baltimore Colts before being traded to the San Diego Chargers in 1973), and Jerry Rice (who spent 16 seasons with the San Francisco 49ers before signing with the Oakland Raiders in 2001).

== All-time list ==
Key

Note: This list is correct through the 2026 NFL season

^	Denotes player who is still active in the NFL
*	Denotes Pro Football Hall of Fame member

NFL players who have spent their career at one franchise (15 seasons minimum)
Player	Seasons	Games	Career	Team	Position	Notes
Lou Groza*	21	268	1946–1959, 1961–1967	Cleveland Browns	K / OT	
Jason Hanson	21	327	1992–2012	Detroit Lions	K	
Darrell Green*	20	295	1983–2002	Washington Redskins	CB	
Jackie Slater*	20	259	1976–1995	Los Angeles / St. Louis Rams	OT	
Bruce Matthews*	19	296	1983–2001	Houston / Tennessee Oilers / Titans	OL	
J. J. Jansen^	18	286	2009–2026	Carolina Panthers	LS	
Pat Leahy	18	250	1974–1991	New York Jets	K	
Ben Roethlisberger	18	249	2004–2021	Pittsburgh Steelers	QB	
Jeff Van Note	18	246	1969–1986	Atlanta Falcons	C	
Julius Adams	17	206	1971–1987	New England Patriots	DL	
Jim Bakken	17	234	1962–1978	St. Louis Cardinals	K / P	
John Brodie	17	201	1957–1973	San Francisco 49ers	QB	
Larry Fitzgerald*	17	263	2004–2020	Arizona Cardinals	WR	
Mike Kenn	17	251	1978–1994	Atlanta Falcons	OT	
Ray Lewis*	17	228	1996–2012	Baltimore Ravens	LB	
Dan Marino*	17	242	1983–1999	Miami Dolphins	QB	
Don Muhlbach	17	260	2004–2020	Detroit Lions	LS	
Mick Tingelhoff*	17	240	1962–1978	Minnesota Vikings	C	
Ken Anderson	16	192	1971–1986	Cincinnati Bengals	QB	
Ronde Barber*	16	241	1997–2012	Tampa Bay Buccaneers	DB	
Sammy Baugh*	16	167	1937–1952	Washington Redskins	QB / DB / P	
Elvin Bethea*	16	210	1968–1983	Houston Oilers	DE	
Monte Coleman	16	215	1979–1994	Washington Redskins	LB	
John Elway*	16	234	1983–1998	Denver Broncos	QB	
Antonio Gates*	16	236	2003–2018	San Diego / Los Angeles Chargers	TE	
Brandon Graham	16	215	2010–2025	Philadelphia Eagles	DE	
Steve Grogan	16	149	1975–1990	New England Patriots	QB	
Cameron Heyward^	16	237	2011–2026	Pittsburgh Steelers	DT	
Gene Hickerson*	16	202	1958–1960, 1962–1973	Cleveland Browns	G	
Jimmy Johnson*	16	213	1961–1976	San Francisco 49ers	CB	
Too Tall Jones	16	224	1974–1978, 1980–1989	Dallas Cowboys	DE	
Cameron Jordan^	16	251	2011–2026	New Orleans Saints	DE	
Sam Koch	16	256	2006–2021	Baltimore Ravens	P	
L. P. Ladouceur	16	253	2005–2020	Dallas Cowboys	LS	
Patrick Mannelly	16	245	1998–2013	Chicago Bears	LS	
Eli Manning	16	236	2004–2019	New York Giants	QB	
Matthew Slater	16	239	2008–2023	New England Patriots	WR	
Bart Starr*	16	196	1956–1971	Green Bay Packers	QB	
Bill Bates	15	217	1983–1997	Dallas Cowboys	S	
Troy Brown	15	192	1993–2007	New England Patriots	WR	
Charlie Cowan	15	206	1961–1975	Los Angeles Rams	OT	
Fred Cox	15	210	1963–1977	Minnesota Vikings	K	
Dan Fouts*	15	181	1973–1987	San Diego Chargers	QB	
Mel Hein*	15	170	1931–1945	New York Giants	C / DL	
Charlie Krueger	15	198	1959–1973	San Francisco 49ers	DT	
Joe Nash	15	218	1982–1996	Seattle Seahawks	DT	
Ray Nitschke*	15	190	1958–1972	Green Bay Packers	LB	
Merlin Olsen*	15	208	1962–1976	Los Angeles Rams	DT	
Jim Otto*	15	210	1960–1974	Oakland Raiders	C	
Randy Rasmussen	15	207	1967–1981	New York Jets	G	
Ken Riley*	15	207	1969–1983	Cincinnati Bengals	CB	
Len Rohde	15	208	1960–1974	San Francisco 49ers	OT	
Joe Scibelli	15	202	1961–1975	Los Angeles Rams	OT / G	
Art Shell*	15	207	1968–1982	Oakland / Los Angeles Raiders	OT	
Harrison Smith^	15	216	2012–2026	Minnesota Vikings	S	
Michael Strahan*	15	216	1993–2007	New York Giants	DE	
Mark Tuinei	15	195	1983–1997	Dallas Cowboys	OT	
Gene Upshaw*	15	217	1967–1981	Oakland Raiders	G	
Wayne Walker	15	200	1958–1972	Detroit Lions	LB / K	
Russ Washington	15	200	1968–1982	San Diego Chargers	OT / DT	
Roy Winston	15	191	1962–1976	Minnesota Vikings	LB	

== See also ==
- List of NFL players by most teams played for
- List of Major League Baseball players who spent their entire career with one franchise
- List of NHL players who spent their entire career with one franchise
- List of NBA players who have spent their entire career with one franchise
- List of one-club men in association football
- List of one-club men in rugby league
