= Kevin Garnett =

American basketball player (born 1976)

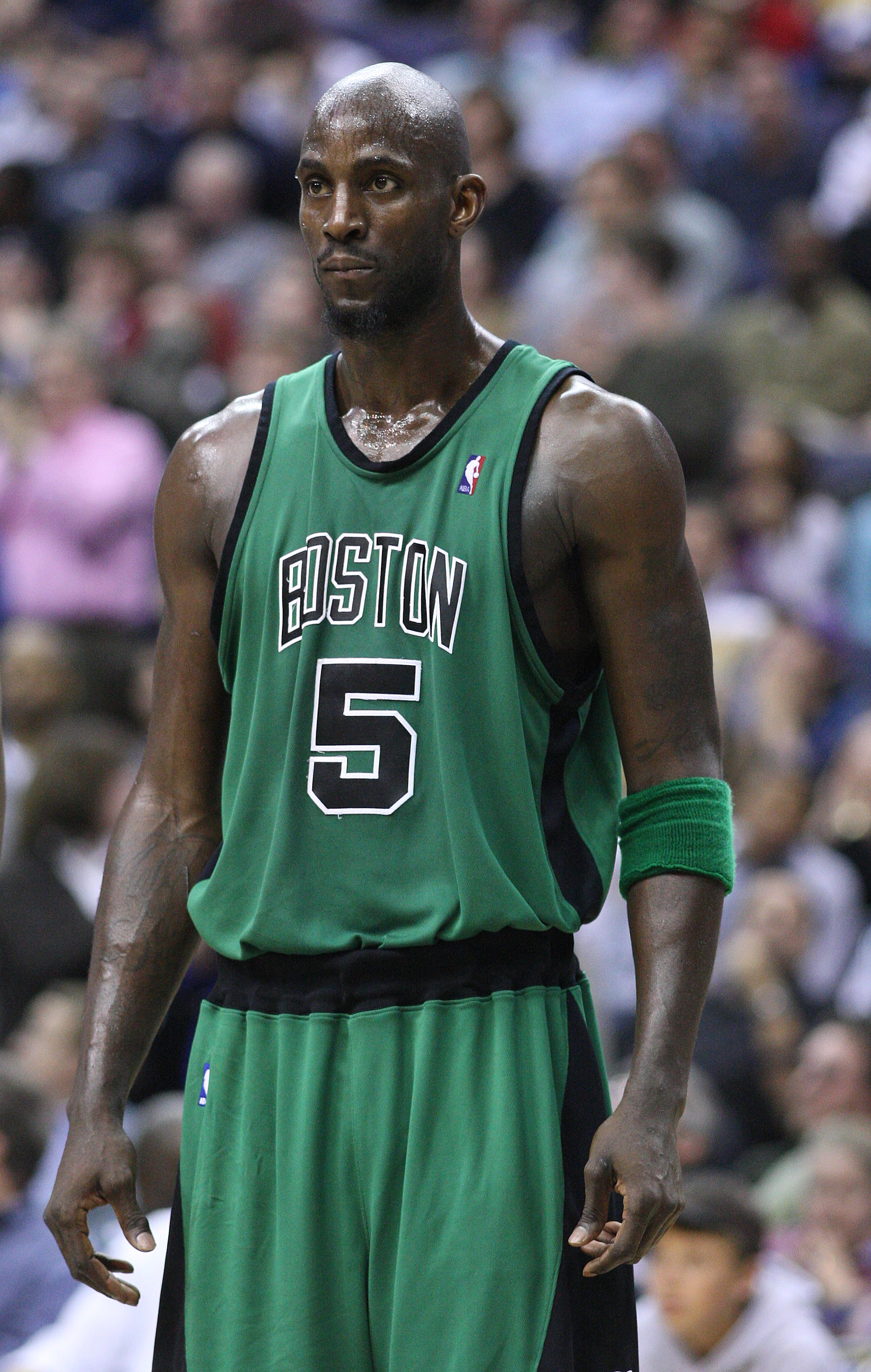
- Garnett with the Boston Celtics in 2008

Personal information
- Born: May 19, 1976 (age 50) Greenville, South Carolina, U.S.
- Listed height: 6 ft 11 in (2.11 m)
- Listed weight: 240 lb (109 kg)

Career information
- High school: Mauldin (Mauldin, South Carolina); Farragut Academy (Chicago, Illinois)
- NBA draft: 1995: 1st round, 5th overall pick
- Drafted by: Minnesota Timberwolves
- Playing career: 1995–2016
- Position: Power forward
- Number: 21, 5, 2

Career history
- 1995–2007: Minnesota Timberwolves
- 2007–2013: Boston Celtics
- 2013–2015: Brooklyn Nets
- 2015–2016: Minnesota Timberwolves

Career highlights
- NBA champion (2008); NBA Most Valuable Player (2004); 15× NBA All-Star (1997, 1998, 2000–2011, 2013); NBA All-Star Game MVP (2003); 4× All-NBA First Team (2000, 2003, 2004, 2008); 3× All-NBA Second Team (2001, 2002, 2005); 2× All-NBA Third Team (1999, 2007); NBA Defensive Player of the Year (2008); 9× NBA All-Defensive First Team (2000–2005, 2008, 2009, 2011); 3× NBA All-Defensive Second Team (2006, 2007, 2012); 4× NBA rebounding champion (2004–2007); NBA All-Rookie Second Team (1996); NBA 75th Anniversary Team; No. 5 retired by Boston Celtics; 2× First-team Parade All-American (1994, 1995); Mr. Basketball USA (1995); USA Today High School Player of the Year (1995); McDonald's All-American MVP (1995); Illinois Mr. Basketball (1995); South Carolina Mr. Basketball (1994)

Career statistics
- Points: 26,071 (17.8 ppg)
- Rebounds: 14,662 (10.0 rpg)
- Assists: 5,445 (3.7 apg)
- Stats at NBA.com
- Stats at Basketball Reference
- Basketball Hall of Fame
Medals
Men's basketball
Representing the United States
Olympic Games
Gold medal – first place	2000 Sydney	Team
FIBA Americas Championship
Gold medal – first place	1999 San Juan	Team

Kevin Maurice Garnett (/ɡɑːrˈnɛt/ gar-NET; born May 19, 1976), commonly known by his initials KG, is an American former professional basketball player who played 21 seasons in the National Basketball Association (NBA). Nicknamed "the Big Ticket", Garnett is widely regarded as one of the greatest power forwards of all time, known for his intensity, versatility, and defensive ability. As of 2026, he is one of five NBA players to have won both the NBA Most Valuable Player Award and the NBA Defensive Player of the Year Award. (Note: David Robinson, Michael Jordan, Hakeem Olajuwon, and Giannis Antetokounmpo are the other four.)

In high school, Garnett was a 1995 McDonald's All-American at Farragut Career Academy and a national player of the year award winner. He entered the 1995 NBA draft, where he was selected with the fifth overall pick by the Minnesota Timberwolves and became the first NBA player drafted directly out of high school in 20 years. Garnett made an immediate impact with the Minnesota Timberwolves, leading them to eight consecutive playoff appearances. In 2004, he led the Timberwolves to the Western Conference Finals and won the NBA MVP Award. He was named the NBA Defensive Player of the Year with the Boston Celtics during the 2007–08 season, his first with the team.

Garnett was traded to the Celtics in 2007, helping guide them to the 2008 NBA Finals and beat the Los Angeles Lakers, while also finishing in third place for the MVP award. In 2013, Garnett was included in a second headline trade that sent him to the Brooklyn Nets with longtime Celtic Paul Pierce. In 2015, Garnett was traded back to Minnesota. He announced his retirement from professional basketball in September 2016. He was inducted into the Naismith Memorial Basketball Hall of Fame in 2020 and named to the NBA 75th Anniversary Team in 2021.

During his NBA career, Garnett was named to 15 All-Star Games, winning the All-Star MVP award in 2003. (Note: Garnett is tied with Shaquille O'Neal and Tim Duncan for the fourth-most All-Star selections of all time. They trail Kobe Bryant (17 selections), Kareem Abdul-Jabbar, and LeBron James (19 each).) He was named to the All-NBA Team nine times and the NBA All-Defensive Team 12 times. Garnett also holds several Timberwolves franchise records.

Garnett made his feature film debut in the 2019 crime thriller Uncut Gems, playing a fictionalized version of himself.

== Early life ==
Garnett was born on May 19, 1976, in Greenville, South Carolina. He is the middle child and has two sisters. Garnett's mother, Shirley Garnett, never married his father, O'Lewis McCullough, with their relationship ending shortly after his birth. Garnett grew up with his mother and stepfather.

Garnett fell in love with the sport of basketball while attending Hillcrest Middle School, although he did not play organized basketball until high school. In his first three years of high school, Garnett attended Mauldin High School in Mauldin, South Carolina, and played on the school's basketball team. However, during the summer before his senior year of high school, Garnett was in the general vicinity of a fight between black and white students. Although not directly involved, Garnett was one of three students arrested for second-degree lynching, a charge that was expunged through a pre-trial intervention. Due to the racially charged incident and fearful of being a target, Garnett decided to leave Mauldin High and transferred to Farragut Career Academy in Chicago's West Side, for his senior year of high school.

Living with his sister in Chicago, Garnett led Farragut to a 28–2 record and was named National High School Player of the Year by USA Today. He was also named Mr. Basketball for the state of Illinois after averaging 25.2 points, 17.9 rebounds, 6.7 assists and 6.5 blocks while shooting 66.8% from the field. In four years of high school, Garnett posted an impressive 2,553 points, 1,809 rebounds and 737 blocked shots. In high school, Garnett played alongside Ronnie Fields, who also became a professional basketball player. Garnett was named the Most Outstanding Player at the McDonald's All-American Game after registering 18 points, 11 rebounds, 4 assists, and 3 blocked shots, and then declared himself eligible for the 1995 NBA draft. To mark the 35th anniversary of the McDonald's All-American High School Boys Basketball Game, Garnett was honored as one of 35 Greatest McDonald's All-Americans. Garnett's decision not to play college basketball was influenced in part by his failure to score well enough on the ACT to meet NCAA requirements for freshman eligibility. Garnett told Student Sports Magazine in 1995 that if he went to college, he would have played college basketball for the University of Maryland, a moderate surprise at the time considering, while Maryland and North Carolina were contenders, the University of Michigan were viewed as front-runners in Garnett's recruitment. However, in the years since his recruitment, several figures close to the recruitment, including former Nike executive Sonny Vaccaro, as well as Garnett himself, have stated that he would have likely attended Michigan, influenced by an appreciation of the Fab Five and Chris Webber, in particular.

A Chicago area high school coach referred Garnett to Eric Fleisher, then agent for 18 NBA players and son of first National Basketball Players Association head Larry Fleisher, to discuss the possibility of going to the NBA straight out of high school. Two weeks later at the Lakeshore Athletic Club, Fleisher ran a small tryout where Garnett dominated against older, more experienced competition. Fleisher then set Detroit Pistons assistant John Hammond to run the drills at another workout at the University of Illinois-Chicago to gauge NBA interest. Representatives from the 13 teams with lottery picks, with Kevin McHale, Elgin Baylor, Flip Saunders, and Kevin Loughery among them, were in the workout that was scheduled around the same time as a pre-draft tryout camp. The workout included Garnett touching the box painted on the backboard above the rim multiple times, and McHale giving Garnett tips on shooting jump shots. An hour before going to the 1995 NBA draft in the Toronto SkyDome, his coach at Farragut, William (Wolf) Nelson, gave encouragement and told Garnett that he passed the last SAT test he took with a score of 970.

== Professional career ==
=== Minnesota Timberwolves (1995–2007) ===
==== Early years (1995–1997) ====
Garnett was drafted with the fifth overall pick in the 1995 NBA draft by the Minnesota Timberwolves, and became the first player to be drafted directly out of high school since 1975. Since joining the NBA for the 1989–90 season, the Timberwolves had not won more than 29 games in any season. In Garnett's rookie season, the Timberwolves were in the midst of a transition phase; they replaced Bill Blair with Flip Saunders as head coach early in the season, and made several trades. Garnett initially came off the bench in his rookie year, but moved into the starting lineup soon after Saunders became head coach and with the urging of Sam Mitchell. In the final 42 games of the year, he averaged 14 points, 8.4 rebounds and 2.26 blocks as a starter. In his rookie year, Garnett and fellow newcomer Tom Gugliotta carried the scoring load. Garnett did not immediately leap to stardom as later prep-to-pro prospects such as Amar'e Stoudemire, LeBron James, and Dwight Howard would, but he did have a very respectable rookie year. He was voted to the All-Rookie Second Team on averages of 10.4 points, 6.3 rebounds, and 1.8 assists per game. Despite having some promising players, the Timberwolves suffered through their seventh consecutive sub-30 win season and failed to make the playoffs. At the time, Garnett was the youngest NBA player in history at 19 years and 11 months of age.

Before the 1996–97 season, the Timberwolves made a draft-day trade for point guard Stephon Marbury of the Georgia Tech Yellow Jackets. During the season, Garnett posted improved averages of 17.0 points, 8.0 rebounds, 3.1 assists, 2.1 blocks, and 1.7 steals. He also had two games where he registered eight blocks. With a 40–42 record, the Timberwolves made their first playoff appearance in franchise history, Garnett and Gugliotta made their first All-Star appearances, and Marbury established himself as a valuable young lead guard. However, the Houston Rockets, led by Hakeem Olajuwon, Clyde Drexler, and Charles Barkley, proved to be too much as the Timberwolves were swept 3–0 in the first round of the 1997 NBA Playoffs.

==== Franchise player (1997–2001) ====
In August 1997, Garnett and Fleisher turned down the Timberwolves' offer of a contract worth $102 million over six years. They thought there would be more offered to them on the basis of the signings of $105 million over seven years for Alonzo Mourning of the Miami Heat and $100.8 million over seven years for Juwan Howard with the Washington Bullets. To get out of the spotlight while negotiations were ongoing, Garnett stayed in Fleisher's Westchester County home, north of New York City. One hour before the deadline on October 1, 1997, the Timberwolves and Garnett agreed on a six-year contract extension that was worth an unparalleled $126 million. The contract was considered a risky move and many analysts speculated that the deal would make it impossible for the Wolves to sign new players or even keep their own. The enormous size of Garnett's contract was considered, by numerous sports writers, a major cause of labor tensions between players and owners that led to a lockout which shortened the 1998–99 NBA season. Despite the furor over his new contract, Garnett continued to improve, averaging 18.5 points, 9.6 rebounds, 4.2 assists, 1.8 blocks, and 1.7 steals per game. Again, he was an All-Star, and the Timberwolves finished with their first winning record in franchise history (45–37 for the season). For the second consecutive year, the young Timberwolves bowed out of the playoffs in the first round, this time losing 3–2 to the Seattle SuperSonics and superstar point guard Gary Payton. The two wins against the Sonics marked the Wolves' first-ever playoff game wins. The off-season started poorly for the Timberwolves though as 20-point per game scorer Tom Gugliotta left for the Phoenix Suns.

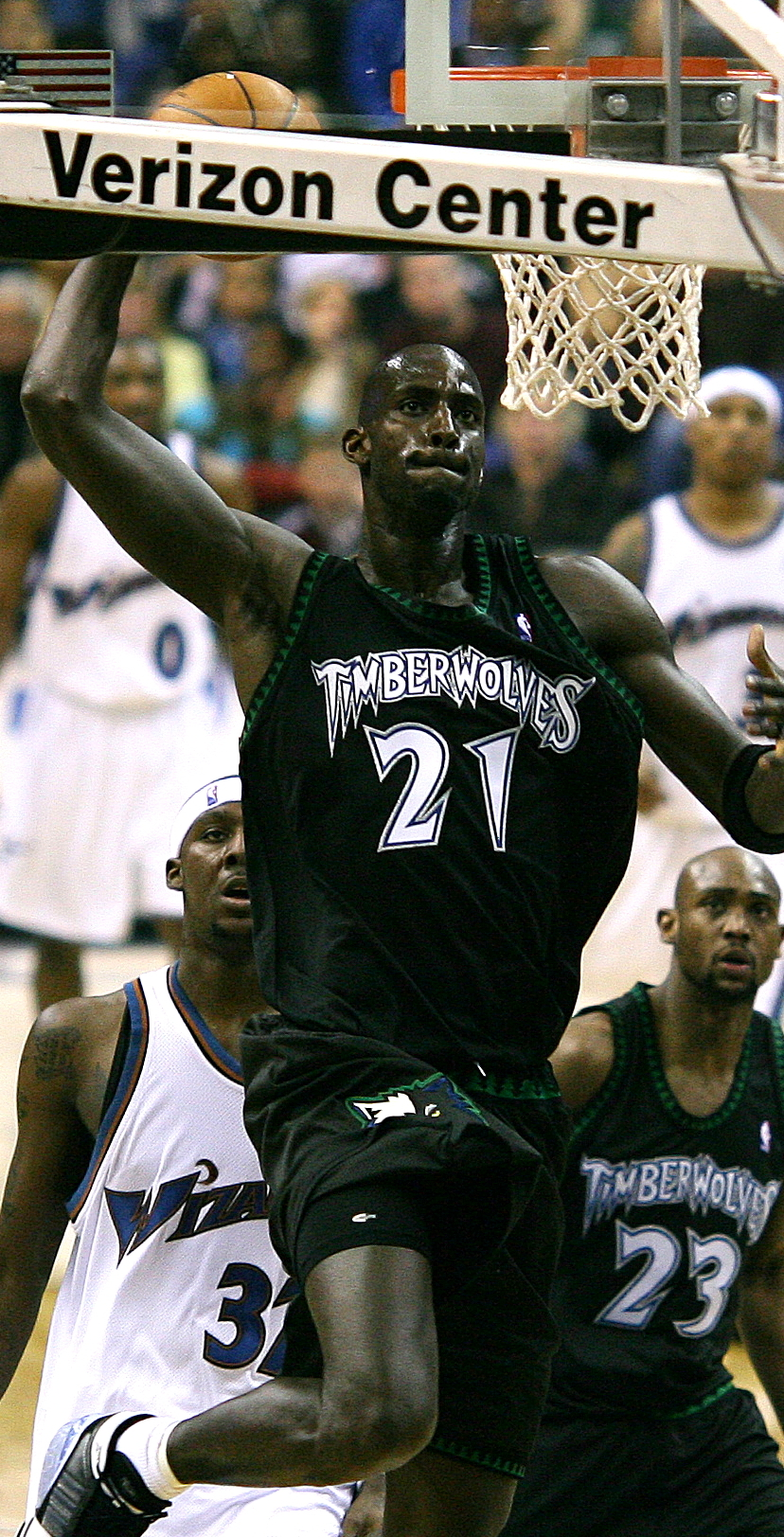
Garnett as a member of the Minnesota Timberwolves (2007)

In the lockout-shortened season that followed, Garnett broke through as a superstar. Putting up stats of 20.8 points, 10.4 rebounds, 4.3 assists, and 1.8 blocks per game, he was named to the All-NBA Third Team. However, midway through the season, Stephon Marbury was traded to the New Jersey Nets. Although the Wolves received two-time All-Star Terrell Brandon in return, they were not able to overcome the discord and limped into the playoffs as the eighth seed with a 25–25 record. The Wolves were defeated in the first round again, this time losing 3–1 to the eventual champion San Antonio Spurs who were led by young superstar and eventual NBA Finals MVP Tim Duncan. In the 1999–2000 NBA season, Garnett continued his notable play, averaging 22.9 points, 11.8 rebounds, 5.0 assists, 1.6 blocks, and 1.5 steals per game. Garnett also made the first of his four All-NBA First Team appearances and came in second place in the MVP voting. Assisted by sharpshooting rookie forward Wally Szczerbiak and steady veteran Terrell Brandon, the Wolves posted a franchise-best 50–32 record, but succumbed in the first round to the Portland Trail Blazers 3–1.

On May 20, 2000, Timberwolves' guard and Garnett's close friend Malik Sealy was killed by a drunk driver shortly after celebrating Garnett's 24th birthday. Later that year, the NBA ruled that the free-agent signing of Joe Smith was illegal. The league punished the team for the illegal signing by stripping them of three first-round draft picks, fining Glen Taylor (the owner of the team) $3.5 million, and banning general manager Kevin McHale for one year. In the 2000–01 NBA season, Garnett led the Wolves to a 47–35 record and made the All-NBA Second Team, but again, the Wolves did not survive the first round of the playoffs, losing to the Spurs 3–1.

==== MVP and division champions (2001–2004) ====
In the 2001–02 season, Garnett posted another notable season, his averages of 21.2 points, 12.1 rebounds, 5.2 assists, 1.6 blocks, and 1.2 steals per game enough for another All-NBA Second Team nomination. However, the Timberwolves bowed out in the first round for the sixth consecutive time, this time getting swept 3–0 by the Dallas Mavericks led by Michael Finley, Steve Nash, and Dirk Nowitzki. Garnett's next season was one of the best of his career, his 23.0 ppg / 13.4 rpg / 6.0 apg / 1.6 bpg / 1.4 spg season earning him his second All-NBA First Team nomination and second place in the MVP voting. The Timberwolves posted a good 51–31 record, but for the seventh consecutive time, they did not make it out of the first round, this time losing to the Los Angeles Lakers 4–2.

In the 2003–04 season, things finally seemed to come together for Garnett. In past years, the Wolves had practically been a one-man show, but now, the Timberwolves had made two valuable acquisitions: highly talented but volatile swingman Latrell Sprewell and the seasoned two-time NBA champion Sam Cassell, who supplanted Troy Hudson at point guard. In addition, defensive center Ervin Johnson complemented the inconsistent Michael Olowokandi. Powered by the best supporting cast up to this point in his career, Garnett averaged 24.2 points, 13.9 rebounds, 5.0 assists, 2.2 blocks, and 1.5 steals per game for the season. Having recorded career-highs in points, rebounds, blocks and leading the league rebounds, Garnett was named the league Most Valuable Player for the first time in his career. With a franchise-record 58 wins, the Wolves stormed into the playoffs, and finally conquered their playoff bane by defeating the Denver Nuggets 4–1 in the first round. After defeating the Sacramento Kings 4–3 in the Western Conference semi-finals, Garnett and the Timberwolves met the Lakers in the Western Conference Finals. There, playmaker Cassell went down with a back injury. With reserve point guard Hudson also injured, the Timberwolves alternated between third playmaker Darrick Martin and shooting guard Fred Hoiberg at the "one", or even running Garnett himself as point forward or a real point guard. The Los Angeles Lakers pulled off a 4–2 victory in the series.

==== Frustration (2004–2007) ====
On January 4, 2005, Garnett scored a career-high 47 points and grabbed 17 rebounds in a 122–115 loss to the Phoenix Suns. At the end of the season, he was named to the All-NBA Second Team. However, the Timberwolves failed to qualify for the playoffs for the first time in eight seasons, finishing with a 44–38 record. Garnett expressed frustration over the midseason firing of longtime head coach Flip Saunders.

The 2005–06 season brought more frustration for Garnett. In the offseason, Minnesota did not re-sign Latrell Sprewell after he turned down a three-year, $21 million extension, and traded Sam Cassell for the much less effective Marko Jarić. Despite Garnett's play, the team logged the second-worst record since Garnett joined the franchise, falling to 33–49. The Timberwolves' record dropped further in 2006–07, going 32–50 that season. In both of those seasons, Garnett earned All-NBA Third Team honors.

During the 2007 off-season, Glen Taylor admitted that although he planned on retaining Garnett, he finally listened to trade offers. Garnett's name was mentioned in various trade rumors involving the Chicago Bulls, Los Angeles Lakers, Golden State Warriors, Indiana Pacers, Boston Celtics, Phoenix Suns, and Dallas Mavericks. Garnett later confirmed that his preferred trade destinations were the Lakers, Celtics, and Suns. He had initially contacted Lakers superstar Kobe Bryant about joining the team as the Lakers were his initial top choice but Bryant didn't answer or return the calls. Garnett stated, "I'm just being honest with everybody. I wanted to link with Kobe. Kobe and I had a different connect. When Kobe-Shaq went on their little thing, a lot of people went with Shaq. A lot of people didn't even fuck with Kobe. You know, Kobe, whatever. One of the very few to just stay with him. I was a neutral guy, anyway. I show everybody love. I tried to link with him, and I couldn't get him on the line." The Lakers originally had a trade framework in place that involved Lamar Odom and Andrew Bynum.

=== Boston Celtics (2007–2013) ===
==== NBA championship, DPOY award and injury (2007–2009) ====
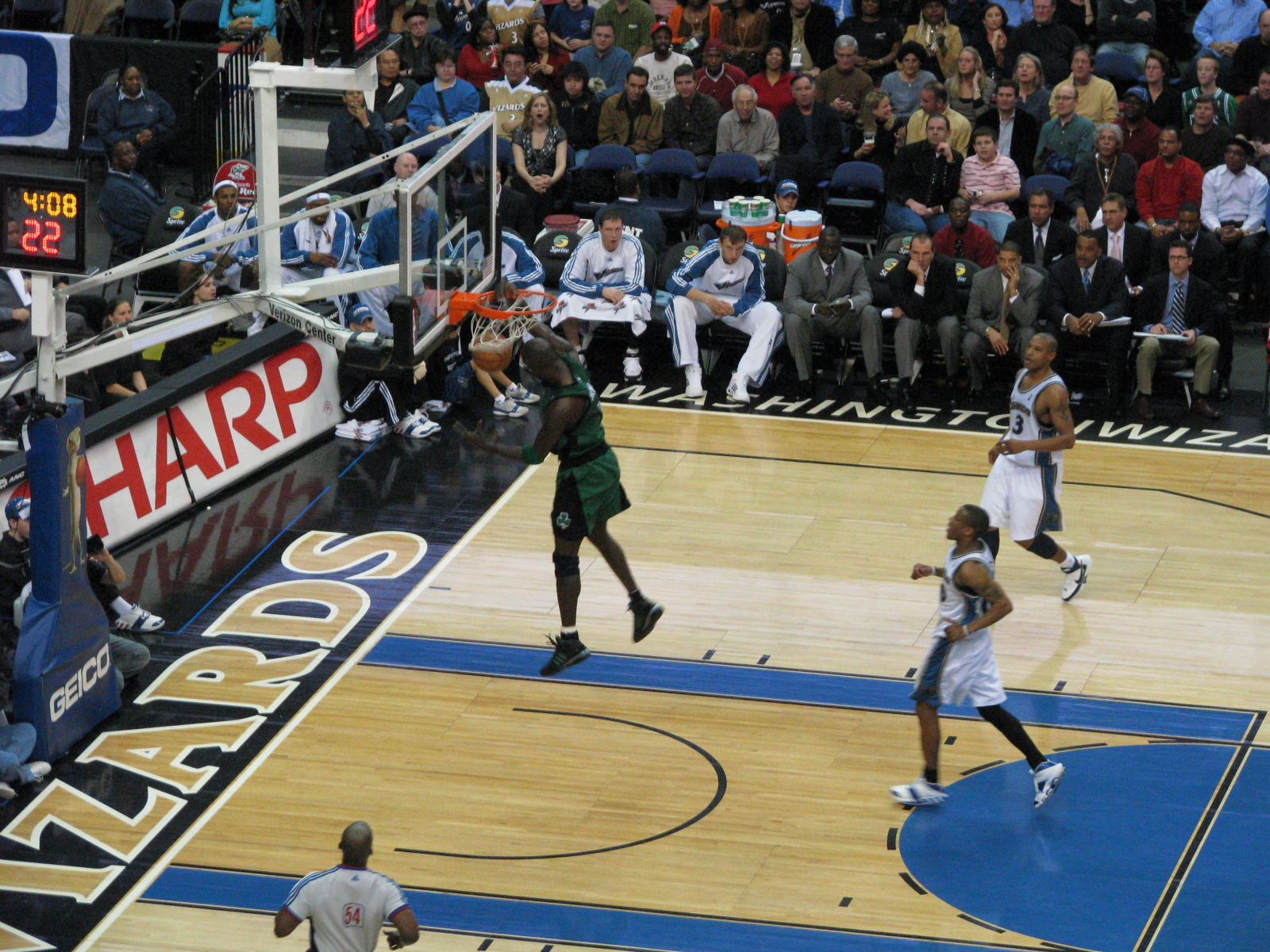
Garnett dunking a ball in a game against the Washington Wizards, January 2008

On July 31, 2007, Garnett was traded to the Boston Celtics in exchange for Al Jefferson, Ryan Gomes, Sebastian Telfair, Gerald Green, Theo Ratliff, cash considerations, Boston's 2009 first-round draft pick (top 3 protected), and the 2009 first-round pick which Minnesota traded to Boston in the Ricky Davis–Wally Szczerbiak trade of 2006. The 7-for-1 deal constitutes the largest number of players traded for a single player in league history. At the time of the trade, Garnett had the longest current tenure of any player in the NBA with one team, having played for the Timberwolves for his first 12 seasons (a total of 927 games). Garnett said that he was proud to be a part of the Celtics and hoped to continue its proud tradition and basketball success. On the day the trade was announced, Garnett signed a three-year, $60 million contract extension that would start after his prior deal ran out in 2009. On August 1, the day after signing with the Celtics, Garnett threw the ceremonial first pitch at Fenway Park prior to a Red Sox–Orioles game.

The trade for Garnett had many experts speculating that the Celtics would have a resurgence during the 2007–08 season. The combination of Paul Pierce, Ray Allen, and Garnett were almost automatically nicknamed "The Big Three" by the media, after the Larry Bird, Kevin McHale, and Robert Parish trio. Garnett wore jersey number 5 for the Celtics since his number with the Timberwolves, number 21, was retired by the Celtics, previously worn by Bill Sharman. He made his Boston debut with a strong performance against the Washington Wizards, with 22 points and 20 rebounds. He also led all players in voting for the 2008 NBA All-Star Game. Garnett received 2,399,148 votes, the twelfth highest total in NBA All-Star balloting history. However, he was unable to play due to an abdominal strain, and Detroit Pistons forward Rasheed Wallace was named to replace him. Garnett passed 20,000 points for his career, becoming the 32nd player in NBA history to reach the mark, with a layup in the second quarter against the Memphis Grizzlies on March 8. On April 22, Garnett was named the NBA Defensive Player of the Year for the 2007–08 season. It was the only major award a Celtic player had not claimed since the franchise's foundation in 1946. Garnett said it was a team effort which helped him win the award. Garnett was also third in MVP voting for the year, behind only Kobe Bryant and Chris Paul. Garnett helped the Celtics to their 17th NBA Championship, with 26 points and 14 rebounds in Game 6 of the NBA Finals. During that championship season, Garnett and Celtics legend Bill Russell developed a relationship, which Garnett credited as a major influence in helping him succeed during his first season as a Celtic. On June 18, 2008, Garnett and Ray Allen appeared on the Late Show with David Letterman, soon after winning the championship.

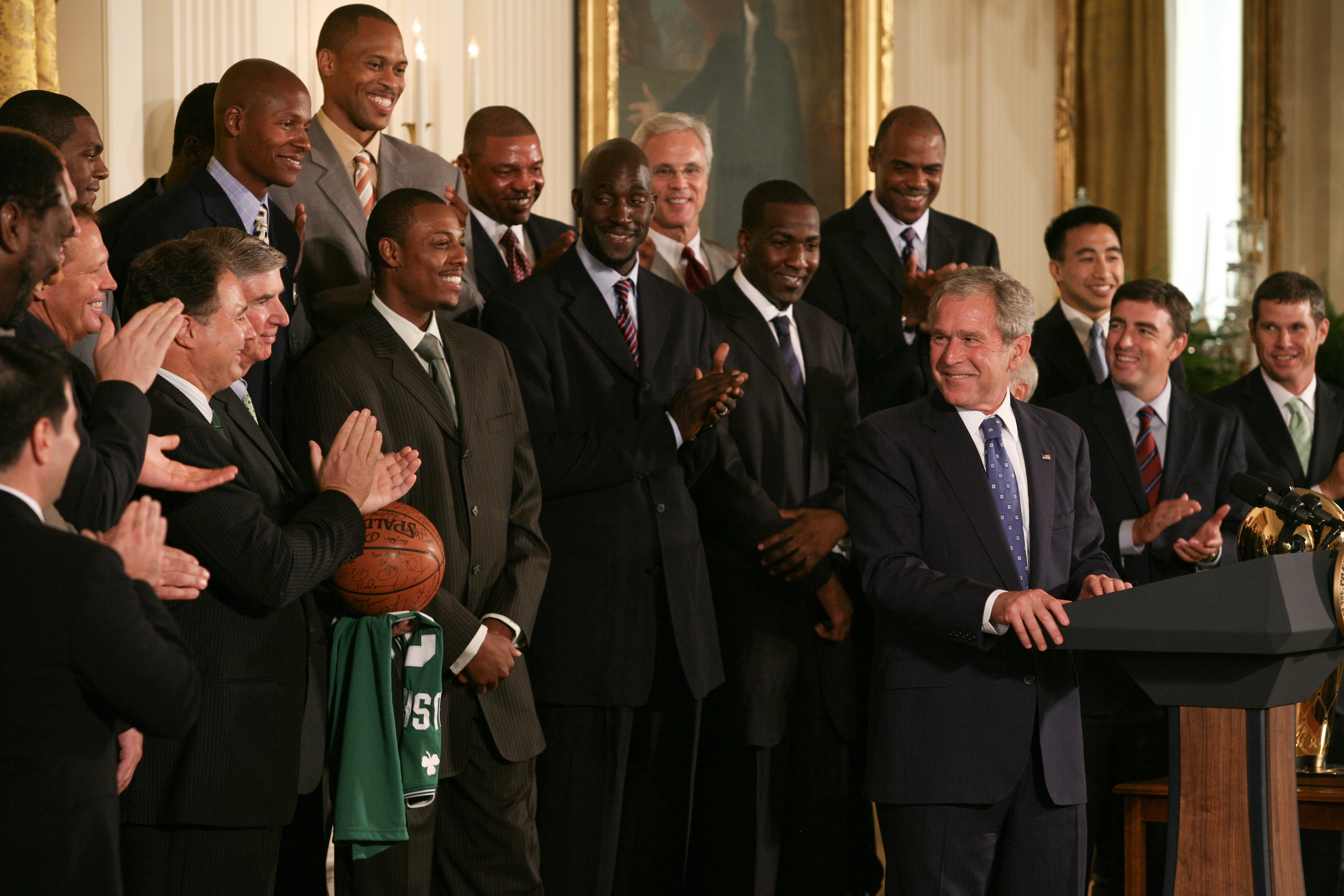
Garnett and the 2008 NBA champion Boston Celtics with President George W. Bush at the White House

In the 2008–09 season, Garnett started all of the 57 games he was able to suit up for. He averaged 15.8 points, 8.5 rebounds, and 2.5 assists. On October 31, 2008, Garnett became the youngest player in NBA history to reach 1,000 career games, at 32 years and 165 days. Garnett earned his twelfth consecutive All-Star Game start on February 15, 2009. Following the All-Star Game, during a game against the Utah Jazz, Garnett injured his right knee late in the second quarter. The injury occurred on February 19, 2009, while attempting to go up for an alley-oop. He was forced to miss the next 14 games. Upon his return, he averaged nine points and 4.5 rebounds in four games before being shut down for the season, missing the final 25 games of the regular season as well as the 2009 playoffs due to his injured knee. In May 2009, he underwent knee surgery. Without Garnett, the Celtics advanced to the Eastern Conference semi-finals, but were eliminated by the Orlando Magic.

==== Final All-Star appearances and falling short (2009–2013) ====
Garnett doing his opening tip routine, December 2008

In the 2009–10 season, Garnett and the Celtics, joined by newly signed free agent Rasheed Wallace, struggled with injuries and inconsistency throughout much of the regular season and earned the fourth seed in the Eastern Conference playoffs. Garnett was selected to play in the 2010 NBA All-Star Game (his 13th All-Star Game selection). Despite being written off by nearly every major sports analyst, the Celtics elevated their play and consistency, and dominated opponents much as they did during their 2008 championship run. They eliminated the Miami Heat, Cleveland Cavaliers, and Orlando Magic to advance to face the Los Angeles Lakers in the 2010 NBA Finals. In Game 6 against the Cavaliers, Garnett recorded 22 points, 12 rebounds, and 3 assists in the series-clinching win. The 2010 Finals went to a decisive seventh game in Los Angeles, where the Celtics led well into the third quarter before the Lakers mounted a comeback and held on for the victory.

In the 2010–11 NBA season, Garnett and the Celtics started strong, winning 23 of their first 26 games. On December 30, 2010, Garnett injured his right knee after he tried to dunk. He missed two weeks with the injury. Garnett returned on January 17, 2011, to face the Orlando Magic. The Celtics ended the regular season third in the Eastern Conference behind the Chicago Bulls and Miami Heat. Garnett averaged under 15 points, under 9 rebounds, and a career low 0.8 blocks per game. After sweeping the New York Knicks in the first round, they faced the Heat in the semi-finals. After losing the first two games of the series, Garnett's playoff high 28 points helped the Celtics take Game 3. However, the Heat won the next two games, winning the series 4–1.

In the lockout shortened 2011–12 NBA season, Garnett and the Celtics started off slowly, being below .500 with a 15–17 record by the All-Star break. Garnett was not selected for the All-Star game for the first time in 11 years. After, however, Boston quickly became one of the best teams in the league, finishing the second half of the season with a 24–10 record, entering the playoffs as the fourth seed in the Eastern Conference with a 39–27 record. Boston made a deep run in the playoffs, going all the way to the Eastern Conference Finals. They faced the Atlanta Hawks in the first round, defeating them in six games. Boston then defeated the Philadelphia 76ers after a challenging seven-game series. Boston made the Eastern Conference Finals for the third time in five years, and faced another superstar trio in Chris Bosh, Dwyane Wade, and LeBron James of the Miami Heat. The Celtics lost the first two games, but came back strong to win the next three games. However, the Heat were too strong in Games 6 and 7, defeating the Celtics 4–3. Garnett found a resurgence in the playoffs, averaging 19.2 points, 10.3 rebounds and 1.4 blocks per game.

On June 30, 2012, Garnett agreed to a three-year contract extension with the Celtics worth an estimated $34 million. On January 17, 2013, it was announced that Garnett was voted to start in the 2013 All-Star Game in Houston. On February 7, 2013, Garnett recorded his 25,000th point in a 116–95 victory over the Los Angeles Lakers.

On August 20, 2021, the Celtics announced that they would retire Garnett's number 5 jersey on March 13, 2022, in a game against the Dallas Mavericks. The ceremony saw the Boston return of Ray Allen, whose relationship with Garnett had been acrimonious since the former left the Celtics for the Miami Heat in 2012. Allen, Garnett, and Pierce hugged at midcourt during the ceremony.

=== Brooklyn Nets (2013–2015) ===
On June 27, 2013, the day of the NBA draft, the Celtics and Brooklyn Nets reached a deal to trade Garnett, Paul Pierce, and Jason Terry for future first-round picks in the 2014, 2016, and 2018 drafts, as well as Kris Humphries, Gerald Wallace, Kris Joseph, MarShon Brooks, and Keith Bogans. Two of the Celtics' picks eventually became future All-Stars Jaylen Brown and Jayson Tatum. The deal was finally completed on July 12 with Brooklyn also receiving D. J. White. Garnett chose to wear number 2 to honor his deceased former Minnesota Timberwolves teammate Malik Sealy.

On December 13, 2013, Garnett surpassed 14,000 career rebounds, becoming only the tenth player in NBA history to do so. In reaching the milestone, Garnett also joined Kareem Abdul-Jabbar and Karl Malone as the only players to reach 25,000 points, 14,000 rebounds, and 5,000 assists. He reached the milestone in the third quarter of a 103–99 road loss to the Detroit Pistons. The Nets cherished Garnett's leadership and passion. Despite boasting a starting line-up of Deron Williams, Joe Johnson, Brook Lopez, Paul Pierce, and Garnett, the Nets were unable to advance past the second round of the playoffs, while Garnett finished his 19th NBA season with career low averages of 6.5 points and 6.6 rebounds per game.

On November 1, 2014, Garnett had arguably his best game for the Nets as he recorded 18 points and 14 rebounds in 35 minutes of action in the Nets' 102–90 win over the Detroit Pistons. Six days later, he recorded five rebounds in a 110–99 win over the New York Knicks and by doing so, passed Walt Bellamy for ninth place on the all-time rebounding list.

=== Return to Minnesota (2015–2016) ===
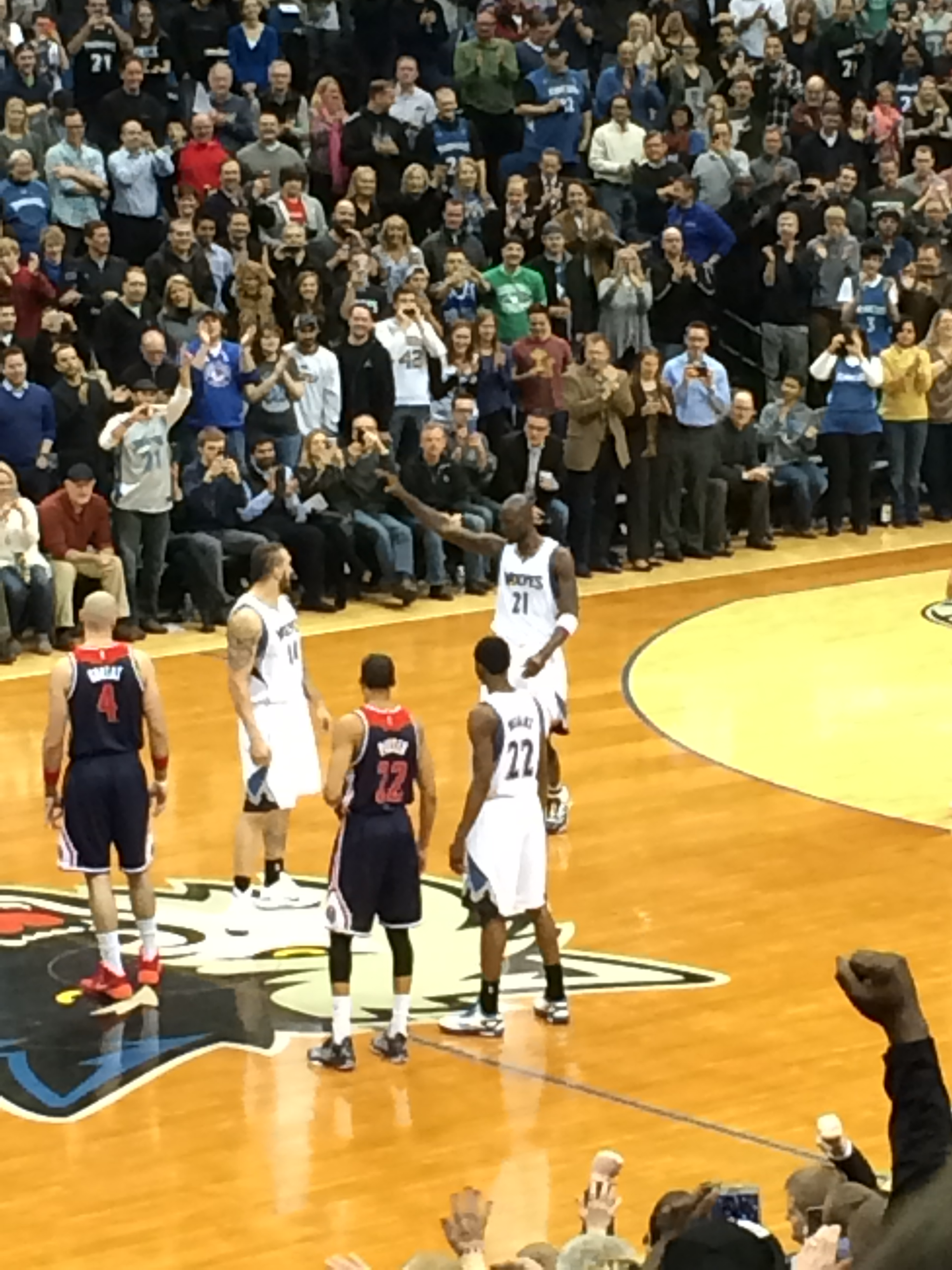
Garnett's first game back with the Timberwolves in 2015.

On February 19, 2015, Garnett agreed to waive his no-trade clause in order to be traded back to Minnesota in exchange for Thaddeus Young. Six days later, he made his return for the Timberwolves against the Washington Wizards at the Target Center, recording five points on two-of-seven shooting with eight rebounds and two blocks in 19 minutes in his first game for Minnesota since 2007. He appeared in just five games for the Timberwolves in 2014–15, before sitting out the team's final 21 games of the season due to a nagging knee injury.

On July 11, 2015, Garnett re-signed with the Timberwolves to a two-year deal. On November 15, 2015, against the Memphis Grizzlies, Garnett became the fifth player in NBA history to play at least 50,000 minutes, joining Kareem Abdul-Jabbar, Karl Malone, Jason Kidd, and Elvin Hayes. On December 1, against the Orlando Magic, Garnett surpassed Kidd (50,110) for third on the NBA's career minutes list. Four days later, in a loss to the Portland Trail Blazers, he became the 15th player in NBA history to surpass 26,000 career points. On December 11, Garnett passed Malone as the NBA's all-time leader in defensive rebounds during Minnesota's 111–108 overtime loss to the Denver Nuggets. He finished the game with four defensive boards to give him 11,409 for his career, three ahead of Malone. Garnett appeared in 38 of the team's first 45 games of the season before missing the entire second half of the season with a right knee injury, the same knee that kept him out of 25 games in 2008–09 when he was playing for Boston, as well as much of his post-trade time in Minnesota during the 2014–15 season.

On September 23, 2016, Garnett announced his retirement after 21 seasons in the NBA. While Garnett did express interest in playing for one more season with the Timberwolves, primarily with the goal in helping the team make it to the playoffs again with its promising young players and new head coach, he also told the team's owner that he was not sure that his knees would hold up for one more season. During his Naismith Hall of Fame speech, Kevin Garnett lamented that his one regret about playing for the Timberwolves was not bringing them a championship.

== National team career ==
In the 2000 Summer Olympics, Garnett won a gold medal as a member of the United States national team. In his first and only FIBA tournament, Garnett averaged 10.8 points, 9.1 rebounds, and 2.1 assists per game.

== Post-playing career ==
In October 2016, Garnett joined the crew on TNT's Inside the NBA. The following month, he became the host of his own segment Area 21. In January 2017, Garnett joined the Los Angeles Clippers as a consultant. He also consulted with the Milwaukee Bucks during the 2016–17 season.

On December 17, 2025, Garnett rejoined the Timberwolves as an ambassador. Prior to that, Garnett had distanced himself from the franchise following his retirement due to a long-standing feud with owner Glen Taylor. However, after the Timberwolves were sold to Marc Lore and Alex Rodriguez, Garnett renewed ties with the organization, with the Timberwolves promising to retire his number 21 jersey within two seasons.

=== Uncut Gems ===
"You realize how hard he worked in acting—he must've worked three times as hard on the court"

— Uncut Gems producer Sebastian Bear-McClard on Garnett

Garnett played a fictionalized version of himself in the 2019 crime thriller Uncut Gems, directed by the Safdie brothers. The movie is set in 2012 and revolves around the Eastern Conference Semi-finals series between the Boston Celtics and Philadelphia 76ers. While playing in Philadelphia, Garnett makes a trip to a New York City jewelry store owned by Howard Ratner (Adam Sandler) in the Diamond District. Garnett takes a liking to an Ethiopian opal which Ratner shows off. The story revolves around Garnett's performance in the series and relationship with the Opal, alongside Ratner's chaotic and intense personal life.

Garnett's performance received positive reviews from critics. The Safdie brothers picked Garnett after a series of rewrites based on available players. Prior to securing Garnett, the duo approached Amar'e Stoudemire, who refused to cut his hair to match the period; Kobe Bryant, whose representation said he wanted to direct and not act, though Bryant said he was not contacted; and Joel Embiid, whose active NBA schedule could not accommodate filming. Garnett was among the first non-active athletes they approached. Garnett said the process of filming "felt special, but you didn't know it."

He then subsequently signed a deal with Village Roadshow Pictures.

== Personal life ==
Garnett wore clothing branded as "OBF", standing for "Official Block Family." The name came from what he called his close group of friends from Beechwood Court in Mauldin, South Carolina. He brought OBF members to live with him in his Minnesota home, and let some onboard team charter flights during road trips. He met Jimmy Jam and Terry Lewis, the Grammy-winning record producers for Janet Jackson and Boyz II Men, early in his career in Minnesota and considers them as mentors.

In July 2004, Garnett married his longtime girlfriend Brandi Padilla during a private ceremony in California. Due to the wedding, Garnett did not take part in the Athens Olympic Games. The couple has two daughters. On July 12, 2018, Garnett's wife filed for divorce, asking for custody of the children. Garnett is the half-brother of former basketball player Louis McCullough. Another professional basketball player, former Los Angeles Laker Shammond Williams, is his cousin.

His nicknames include "The Big Ticket," "KG," "The Kid," and "The Franchise" (after being known as the Minnesota Timberwolves' franchise player). He mentally prepared himself before games by banging his head against a padded basketball stanchion. Although Garnett is officially listed as 6 ft 11 in (2.11 m) by the NBA, he is widely accepted to be at least 7 ft 0 in (2.13 m) tall. During the 2007 NBA All-Star Game, Garnett admitted in an interview with Craig Sager to be "6 ft 11 in and some quarters" tall. Measurements from the 1995 NBA draft indicated that Garnett, 19 years old at the time, was 6 ft 11 in (2.11 m) tall barefoot. In 1997, Garnett was measured by the Minnesota Timberwolves training staff to be 7 ft 1 in (2.16 m) tall in his basketball shoes. In December 2011, Garnett agreed to become a limited shareholder of American-owned Italian Serie A football team A.S. Roma.

In February 2021, Simon & Schuster published Garnett's autobiography, KG: A to Z: An Uncensored Encyclopedia of Life, Basketball, and Everything in Between, written with David Ritz. In the book, Garnett describes his involvement with various sneaker manufacturers.

== NBA career statistics ==
Legend
GP	Games played	GS	Games started	MPG	Minutes per game
FG%	Field goal percentage	3P%	3-point field goal percentage	FT%	Free throw percentage
RPG	Rebounds per game	APG	Assists per game	SPG	Steals per game
BPG	Blocks per game	PPG	Points per game	**Bold**	Career high
†	Won an NBA championship	*	Led the league	‡	NBA record

=== Regular season ===
Year	Team	GP	GS	MPG	FG%	3P%	FT%	RPG	APG	SPG	BPG	PPG
1995–96	Minnesota	80	43	28.7	.491	.286	.705	6.3	1.8	1.1	1.6	10.4
1996–97	Minnesota	77	77	38.9	.499	.286	.754	8.0	3.1	1.4	2.1	17.0
1997–98	Minnesota	**82***	**82***	39.3	.491	.188	.738	9.6	4.2	**1.7**	1.8	18.5
1998–99	Minnesota	47	47	37.9	.460	.286	.704	10.4	4.3	**1.7**	1.8	20.8
1999–00	Minnesota	81	81	40.0	.497	**.370**	.765	11.8	5.0	1.5	1.6	22.9
2000–01	Minnesota	81	81	39.5	.477	.288	.764	11.4	5.0	1.4	1.8	22.0
2001–02	Minnesota	81	81	39.2	.470	.319	.801	12.1	5.2	1.2	1.6	21.2
2002–03	Minnesota	**82**	**82***	**40.5**	.502	.282	.751	13.4	**6.0**	1.4	1.6	23.0
2003–04	Minnesota	**82**	**82**	39.4	.499	.256	.791	**13.9***	5.0	1.5	**2.2**	**24.2**
2004–05	Minnesota	**82**	**82***	38.1	.502	.240	.811	13.5*	5.7	1.5	1.4	22.2
2005–06	Minnesota	76	76	38.9	.526	.267	.810	12.7*	4.1	1.4	1.4	21.8
2006–07	Minnesota	76	76	39.4	.476	.214	.835	12.8*	4.1	1.2	1.7	22.4
2007–08†	Boston	71	71	32.8	.539	.000	.801	9.2	3.4	1.4	1.2	18.8
2008–09	Boston	57	57	31.1	.531	.250	.841	8.5	2.5	1.1	1.2	15.8
2009–10	Boston	69	69	29.9	.521	.200	.837	7.3	2.7	1.0	.8	14.3
2010–11	Boston	71	71	31.3	.528	.200	**.862**	8.9	2.4	1.3	.8	14.9
2011–12	Boston	60	60	31.1	.503	.333	.857	8.2	2.9	.9	1.0	15.8
2012–13	Boston	68	68	29.7	.496	.125	.786	7.8	2.3	1.1	.9	14.8
2013–14	Brooklyn	54	54	20.5	.441	.000	.809	6.6	1.5	.8	.7	6.5
2014–15	Brooklyn	42	42	20.3	.455	.167	.829	6.8	1.6	1.0	.3	6.8
2014–15	Minnesota	5	5	19.6	**.581**	.000	.500	5.2	1.6	1.0	.8	7.6
2015–16	Minnesota	38	38	14.6	.470	.000	.667	3.9	1.6	.7	.3	3.2
Career		1,462	1,425	34.5	.497	.275	.789	10.0	3.7	1.3	1.4	17.8
All-Star		14	11	20.5	.511	.000	.875	6.3	2.9	1.1	.8	11.3

=== Playoffs ===
Year	Team	GP	GS	MPG	FG%	3P%	FT%	RPG	APG	SPG	BPG	PPG
1997	Minnesota	3	3	41.7	.471	**1.000**	**1.000**	9.3	3.7	1.3	1.0	17.3
1998	Minnesota	5	5	38.8	.480	.000	.778	9.6	4.0	.8	**2.4**	15.8
1999	Minnesota	4	4	42.5	.443	.000	.739	12.0	3.8	1.8	2.0	21.8
2000	Minnesota	4	4	42.8	.385	.667	.813	10.8	**8.8**	1.3	.8	18.8
2001	Minnesota	4	4	41.3	.466	.000	.833	12.0	4.3	1.0	1.5	21.0
2002	Minnesota	3	3	43.3	.429	.500	.719	**18.7**	5.0	1.7	1.7	24.0
2003	Minnesota	6	6	**44.2**	.514	.333	.607	15.7	5.2	1.7	1.7	**27.0**
2004	Minnesota	18	18	43.5	.452	.313	.776	14.6	5.1	1.3	2.3	24.3
2008†	Boston	**26**‡	**26**‡	38.0	.495	.250	.810	10.5	3.3	1.3	1.1	20.4
2010	Boston	23	23	33.3	.495	.000	.839	7.4	2.5	1.1	.9	15.0
2011	Boston	9	9	36.3	.441	.000	.759	10.9	2.6	**1.9**	1.0	14.9
2012	Boston	20	20	36.9	.497	.250	.813	10.3	1.5	1.2	1.5	19.2
2013	Boston	6	6	35.3	.500	.000	.941	13.7	3.5	.8	1.0	12.7
2014	Brooklyn	12	12	20.8	**.524**	.000	.739	6.3	1.3	.8	.4	6.9
Career		143	143	36.9	.478	.273	.789	10.7	3.3	1.2	1.3	18.2

== Achievements and records ==
Garnett has a long list of achievements and records, including:

- Only player who is a franchise's leader in points, rebounds, assists, steals, blocks (namely, Minnesota Timberwolves)
- Only NBA player to reach at least 25,000 points, 10,000 rebounds, 5,000 assists, 1,500 steals, and 1,500 blocks
- Only NBA player to average at least 20 points, 10 rebounds, and 5 assists per game for 6 consecutive seasons: 1999–2000–2004–05
- Only NBA player to average at least 20 points, 10 rebounds, and 4 assists per game for 9 consecutive seasons: 1998–99–2006–07
- Most defensive rebounds in a career (since tracking began 1973–74 season) with 11,453 defensive rebounds
- Seasons leading the league in defensive rebounds: 5 (2002–03–2006–07)
  - Broken by Dwight Howard (2007–08–2012–13)
- Consecutive seasons leading the league in defensive rebounds: 5 (2002–03–2006–07)
  - Broken by Dwight Howard (2007–08–2012–13)
- First NBA player to win the NBA Player of the Month Award four times in a single season: 2003–04 season
  - Also achieved by LeBron James, who has achieved this twice
- Most First-team selections to the All-Defensive Team with 9 selections
  - Tied with Michael Jordan, Gary Payton, Kobe Bryant
- Third NBA player to lead his team in all five major statistics (points, rebounds, assists, steals, blocks) in the same season: Minnesota Timberwolves, 2002–03
  - Also achieved by Dave Cowens (Boston Celtics, 1977–78), Scottie Pippen (Chicago Bulls, 1994–95), LeBron James (Cleveland Cavaliers, 2008–09), Giannis Antetokounmpo (Milwaukee Bucks, 2016–17), and Nikola Jokić (Denver Nuggets, 2021–22)
- Tied for the third most seasons played in the NBA: 21 seasons
  - Also achieved by Robert Parish, Kevin Willis and Dirk Nowitzki

Achievements:

- NBA champion: 2008
- Olympic gold medal: 2000
- NBA Most Valuable Player: 2004
- NBA Defensive Player of the Year: 2008
- NBA All-Star Game MVP: 2003
- 15-time NBA All-Star: 1997–2011, 2013
  - Selected to 14 consecutive All-Star teams (1997–2011) (no game in 1999 due to lockout)
  - Selected in 2008, but did not play due to injury
- 9-time All-NBA selection:
  - 4x First Team: 2000, 2003, 2004, 2008
  - 3x Second Team: 2001, 2002, 2005
  - 2x Third Team: 1999, 2007
- 12-time All-Defensive Team selection:
  - 9x First Team: 2000–2005, 2008–2009, 2011
  - 3x Second Team: 2006–2007, 2012
- NBA All-Rookie selection:
  - Second team: 1996
- J. Walter Kennedy Citizenship Award: 2006
- NBA 75th Anniversary Team: 2021

== See also ==
- List of NBA All-Stars
- List of NBA career scoring leaders
- List of NBA career rebounding leaders
- List of NBA career steals leaders
- List of NBA career blocks leaders
- List of NBA career turnovers leaders
- List of NBA career personal fouls leaders
- List of NBA career free throw scoring leaders
- List of NBA career games played leaders
- List of NBA career minutes played leaders
- List of NBA career playoff rebounding leaders
- List of NBA career playoff blocks leaders
- List of NBA career playoff triple-double leaders
- List of NBA annual rebounding leaders
- List of NBA seasons played leaders

== Notes ==
Awards and achievements
Preceded by Jarrod Gee	Illinois Mr. Basketball Award Winner; 1995	Succeeded by Ronnie Fields
