= Kevin Willis =

American basketball player (born 1962)

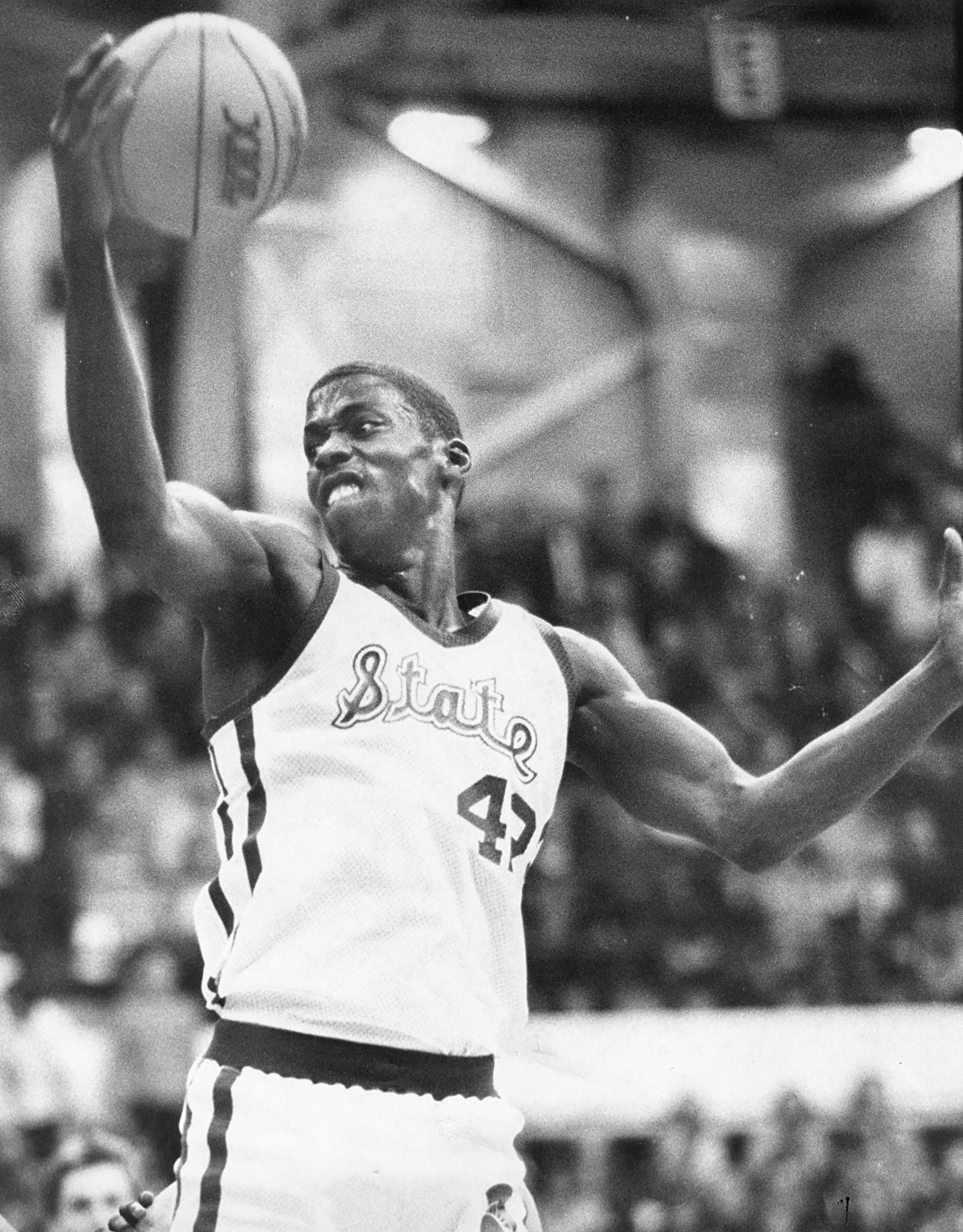
- Willis in the early 1980s

Personal information
- Born: September 6, 1962 (age 64) Los Angeles, California, U.S.
- Listed height: 7 ft 0 in (2.13 m)
- Listed weight: 245 lb (111 kg)

Career information
- High school: John J. Pershing (Detroit, Michigan)
- College: Jackson College (1980–1981); Michigan State (1981–1984)
- NBA draft: 1984: 1st round, 11th overall pick
- Drafted by: Atlanta Hawks
- Playing career: 1984–2005, 2007
- Position: Power forward / center
- Number: 42, 41, 43, 45

Career history
- 1984–1994: Atlanta Hawks
- 1994–1996: Miami Heat
- 1996: Golden State Warriors
- 1996–1998: Houston Rockets
- 1998–2001: Toronto Raptors
- 2001: Denver Nuggets
- 2001–2002: Houston Rockets
- 2002–2004: San Antonio Spurs
- 2004–2005: Atlanta Hawks
- 2007: Dallas Mavericks

Career highlights
- NBA champion (2003); NBA All-Star (1992); All-NBA Third Team (1992)

Career NBA statistics
- Points: 17,523 (12.1 ppg)
- Rebounds: 11,901 (8.4 rpg)
- Assists: 1,328 (0.9 apg)
- Stats at NBA.com
- Stats at Basketball Reference

Kevin Alvin Willis (born September 6, 1962) is an American former professional basketball player mostly known for playing with the Atlanta Hawks in the National Basketball Association (NBA). He was a 7-foot power forward/center. Excluding players not yet eligible, he holds the record for most games played among those not in the Naismith Memorial Basketball Hall of Fame.

Willis is one of fifteen players in NBA history with over 16,000 career points and 11,000 career rebounds. He was named to the NBA Eastern Conference All-Star Team in 1992, when he finished the season with a career-high average of 15.5 rebounds a game. Willis holds career averages of 12.2 ppg, 8.4 rpg, and 0.9 apg while averaging 27 minutes per game in 21 NBA seasons. During his 23 years in the league, he won one championship with the San Antonio Spurs in 2003. He shares the third position for most seasons played in the NBA with Robert Parish, Chris Paul, Kevin Garnett, and Dirk Nowitzki.

During the 2004–05 season, Willis was the oldest player in the league at age 42, and he would continue to be until his retirement at the conclusion of the 2006–07 season at the age of 44. Ultimately, Willis became the second-oldest person to play in the NBA.

== Early life ==
Born in Los Angeles, Willis graduated from Pershing High School in Detroit and joined the basketball team in his junior year.

== College career ==
Willis played competitively at Jackson College for his freshman season and transferred to Michigan State University, where he would play three seasons as a fashion and textiles major.

== Professional career ==
=== Atlanta Hawks (1984–1994) ===
He was selected in the 1984 NBA draft by the Atlanta Hawks. On March 11, 1986, Willis scored a career-high 39 points and grabbed 21 rebounds during a 128–116 win over the Denver Nuggets. In total, he played with the Hawks for nine seasons (plus two games of a tenth season) until 1994. Willis teamed with Dominique Wilkins, Spud Webb, and Doc Rivers to frequently guide the Hawks to playoff appearances as well as providing a fierce rebounding presence in the post. Near the end of his stint with the Hawks, he and Wilkins were both made team captains.

=== Miami Heat (1994–1996) ===
Willis was traded to the Miami Heat in 1994 for Grant Long and Steve Smith. Willis' first season was tumultuous, and the trade was so poorly received in Miami that it indirectly led to the organization seeking to, and eventually succeeding in, hiring Pat Riley to be their new head coach and General Manager.

=== Golden State Warriors (1996) ===
On the 1996 NBA trade deadline, the Golden State Warriors acquired Willis, along with Bimbo Coles, in exchange for Chris Gatling and Tim Hardaway.

=== Houston Rockets (1996–1998) ===
Willis signed with the Houston Rockets in 1996.

=== Toronto Raptors (1998–2001) ===
On June 9, 1998, Willis was traded to the Toronto Raptors for Roy Rogers and two 1998 first-round picks.

=== Denver Nuggets (2001) ===
On January 12, 2001, the Denver Nuggets acquired Willis, Aleksandar Radojević, Garth Joseph, and a 2001 2nd-round pick in a deal that brought Tracy Murray, Keon Clark, and Mamadou N'Diaye to Toronto. He and Radojević were traded together nine months later to the Milwaukee Bucks for Scott Williams and a 2002 second-round pick.

=== Return to Houston Rockets (2001–2002) ===
Without playing a game for the Bucks, Willis was traded back to the Rockets for another 2002 second-round pick.

=== San Antonio Spurs (2002–2004) ===
Willis signed with the San Antonio Spurs. It was in 2003 with the Spurs that he finally won an NBA Championship ring.

=== Return to Atlanta Hawks (2004–2005) ===
Willis returned to the Hawks for one more season in 2004–05, and by doing so, positioned himself to be the oldest player in the league.

=== Dallas Mavericks (2007) ===
On March 30, 2007, The Dallas Morning News reported that Willis needed only to pass a physical to be able to sign with the Western Conference-leading Dallas Mavericks. Willis, who did not play in 2005–06, was reported to take the team's vacant 15th roster spot. The deal became official when he signed a 10-day contract with the Mavericks on April 2, 2007. He appeared in five late regular-season games and was on the Mavericks playoff roster as the 12th man but did not play in the Mavericks' first-round exit. By playing five games during 2006–07, Willis became the oldest person to play more than two games in an NBA season (Providence Steamrollers coach Nat Hickey activated himself for two games in 1948, at 45 years and 363 days old.) Hall of Famer Robert Parish, who – at age 43 – played 43 games with the Chicago Bulls in 1996–97, previously held many of Willis' longevity and age-based records.

=== Retirement ===
Willis ended his playing career after the 2006–07 season, returning to his clothing business, Willis & Walker. The Atlanta-based company, which specializes in custom wear for big and tall men, was founded in 1988 by Willis and his former Michigan State teammate Ralph Walker.

Professional wrestler Lex Luger revealed that Willis made him various suits in his time as a clothier, as well as a white, collared Nehru shirt that he would later prominently wear in his WCW return on Nitro in 1995. Luger knew Willis from years prior, with the former having worked in the Georgia-based promotion originally from 1987 to 1992.

== Television appearances ==
In 2007, Willis made three appearances on the Spike TV reality show, Pros vs Joes.

== Career statistics ==
Legend
GP	Games played	GS	Games started	MPG	Minutes per game
FG%	Field goal percentage	3P%	3-point field goal percentage	FT%	Free throw percentage
RPG	Rebounds per game	APG	Assists per game	SPG	Steals per game
BPG	Blocks per game	PPG	Points per game	**Bold**	Career high
†	Won an NBA championship

=== NBA ===
==== Regular season ====
Year	Team	GP	GS	MPG	FG%	3P%	FT%	RPG	APG	SPG	BPG	PPG
1984–85	Atlanta	**82**	19	21.8	.467	.221	.657	6.4	.4	.4	.6	9.3
1985–86	Atlanta	**82**	59	28.0	.517	.000	.654	8.6	.5	.8	.5	12.3
1986–87	Atlanta	81	**81**	32.4	**.536**	.250	.709	10.5	.8	.8	.8	16.1
1987–88	Atlanta	75	55	27.9	.518	.000	.649	7.3	.4	.9	.5	11.6
1989–90	Atlanta	81	51	28.1	.519	.286	.683	8.0	.7	.8	.6	12.4
1990–91	Atlanta	80	80	29.7	.504	**.400**	.668	8.8	1.2	.8	.5	13.1
1991–92	Atlanta	81	80	36.6	.483	.162	.804	15.5	**2.1**	.9	.7	18.3
1992–93	Atlanta	80	80	36.0	.506	.241	.653	12.9	**2.1**	.9	.5	17.9
1993–94	Atlanta	80	80	35.8	.499	.375	.713	12.0	1.9	**1.0**	.5	19.1
1994–95	Atlanta	2	2	**44.5**	.390	.000	.667	**18.0**	1.5	.5	**1.5**	**21.0**
1994–95	Miami	65	61	35.4	.469	.214	.691	10.7	1.3	.9	.5	17.1
1995–96	Miami	47	42	28.9	.473	.000	.712	8.9	.7	.4	.5	10.2
1995–96	Golden State	28	18	27.8	.433	.250	.701	7.8	.7	.5	.6	11.3
1996–97	Houston	75	32	26.2	.481	.143	.693	7.5	.9	.6	.4	11.2
1997–98	Houston	81	74	31.2	.510	.143	.793	8.4	1.0	.7	.5	16.1
1998–99	Toronto	42	38	29.0	.418	.000	.839	8.3	1.6	.7	.7	12.0
1999–00	Toronto	79	1	21.3	.415	.333	.799	6.1	.6	.5	.6	7.6
2000–01	Toronto	35	9	22.0	.461	.000	.753	6.4	.6	.5	.6	8.8
2000–01	Denver	43	13	24.6	.428	.250	.788	7.2	.7	.9	.7	9.6
2001–02	Houston	52	5	16.7	.440	.000	.747	5.8	.3	.5	.4	6.1
2002–03†	San Antonio	71	6	11.8	.479	.000	.614	3.2	.3	.3	.3	4.2
2003–04	San Antonio	48	0	7.8	.467	.000	.615	2.0	.2	.4	.2	3.4
2004–05	Atlanta	29	5	11.9	.389	.000	.739	2.6	.3	.3	.2	3.0
2006–07	Dallas	5	0	8.6	.385	–	**1.000**	1.6	.2	.4	.2	2.4
Career		1,424	891	26.9	.487	.211	.713	8.4	.9	.7	.5	12.1
All-Star		1	0	14.0	.400	–	–	4.0	.0	.0	.0	8.0

==== Playoffs ====
Year	Team	GP	GS	MPG	FG%	3P%	FT%	RPG	APG	SPG	BPG	PPG
1986	Atlanta	9	–	31.1	.561	–	.652	7.2	.6	.8	.9	13.9
1987	Atlanta	9	–	**39.6**	.522	–	.677	9.2	.7	**1.0**	.8	15.7
1988	Atlanta	12	–	38.5	**.580**	.000	.680	9.0	.9	.8	.8	16.2
1991	Atlanta	5	5	31.8	.403	.667	.700	9.0	**1.0**	.4	.2	15.4
1993	Atlanta	3	3	34.3	.467	.000	.571	8.7	**1.0**	.7	.0	**16.7**
1994	Atlanta	11	11	32.9	.457	.000	.762	**10.8**	**1.0**	.7	.5	12.2
1997	Houston	16	0	18.4	.400	.000	.684	4.7	.7	.6	.3	6.4
1998	Houston	5	5	33.6	.400	.000	.750	10.6	**1.0**	**1.0**	**1.6**	11.2
2000	Toronto	3	0	25.3	.364	–	.750	8.7	.3	.7	.0	13.0
2003†	San Antonio	**18**	0	5.1	.525	**1.000**	**1.000**	1.7	.1	.1	.1	2.6
2004	San Antonio	7	0	3.6	.375	.000	.000	.9	.0	.1	.0	.9
Career		98	–	24.3	.484	.214	.692	6.5	.6	.6	.4	9.9

=== College ===
*	Led Big Ten Conference

Year	Team	GP	GS	MPG	FG%	3P%	FT%	RPG	APG	SPG	BPG	PPG
1981–82	Michigan State	**27**	14	19.2	.474		.567	4.2	.1	.4	.4	6.0
1982–83	Michigan State	**27**	**25**	**32.0**	**.596**	.000	.514	**9.6***	**.3**	**.8**	**1.3**	**13.3**
1983–84	Michigan State	25	23	29.5	.492		**.661**	7.7	**.3**	.4	1.0	11.0
Career		79	62	26.8	.530	.000	.579	7.1	.2	.5	.9	10.1

== See also ==
- List of NBA career games played leaders
- List of NBA career minutes played leaders
- List of NBA career rebounding leaders
- List of NBA single-season rebounding leaders
- List of NBA single-game rebounding leaders
- List of NBA career personal fouls leaders
- List of oldest and youngest NBA players
- List of NBA seasons played leaders
