= List of NBA seasons played leaders =

Only twelve players in the history of the National Basketball Association (NBA) have played 20 or more seasons in their respective careers. In 1985–86, Kareem Abdul-Jabbar broke the previous NBA record of 16 seasons held by Dolph Schayes, John Havlicek, Paul Silas and Elvin Hayes; he finished his career in 1988–89 with a then-record 20 seasons played. Robert Parish broke the mark in 1996–97, when he retired after 21 seasons, and Kevin Willis tied him in his final season in 2006–07. (Note: Willis' career spanned 23 years, but he missed two seasons. He was out injured all of 1988–89 and initially retired and did not play in 2005–06 before returning for five games in 2007.) They were joined by Kevin Garnett in 2015–16 when he began his 21st season. His Minnesota Timberwolves played their season opener against the Los Angeles Lakers and Kobe Bryant, who became the fifth player to reach the 20-season plateau that night. The game was the first time in league history that two opposing players each had at least 20 years of experience. Having played his entire career with the Lakers, Bryant was also the first NBA player to spend 20 seasons with one team. In 2018–19, Dirk Nowitzki surpassed Bryant with 21 seasons with the Dallas Mavericks. In 2019–20, Vince Carter became the first player to play 22 seasons in the NBA. In 2025–26, LeBron James surpassed this record by playing in his 23rd season.

In the NBA, big men typically have longer playing careers than smaller men. Older centers and power forwards may have the luxury of pacing themselves while running the court, or they might station themselves in the post. Big men Parish, Willis, and Garnett all had relatively minor roles while playing in their respective 21st seasons. On the other hand, guards are tasked with handling the ball full-court and are generally more dependent on traits like speed and quickness that deteriorate with age. Bryant was the first guard to play 20 seasons, passing the previous mark of 19 seasons for guards held by John Stockton and Jason Kidd. In his final season, he was moved to small forward and surrounded by other ball handlers.

== Seasons played leaders ==
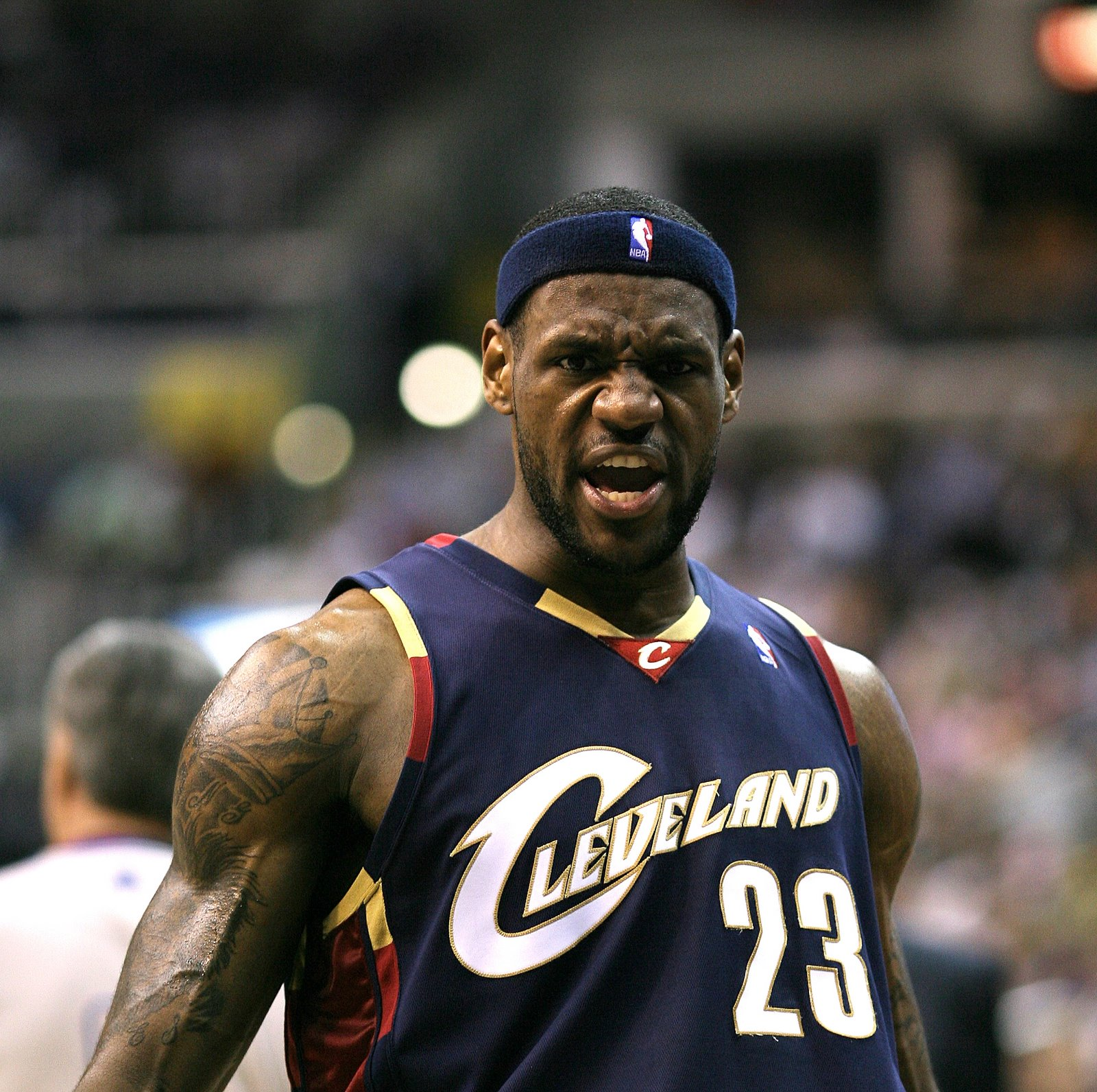
LeBron James, who began his career with the Cleveland Cavaliers, holds the NBA record of 24 seasons played.

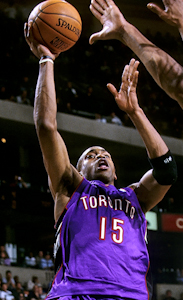
Vince Carter, who began his career with the Toronto Raptors, is the first player in NBA history to have played in 22 seasons.

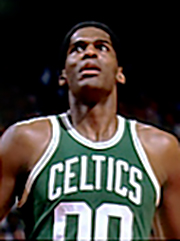
Robert Parish was the first to play 21 seasons in the NBA, currently tied for the third most in league history.

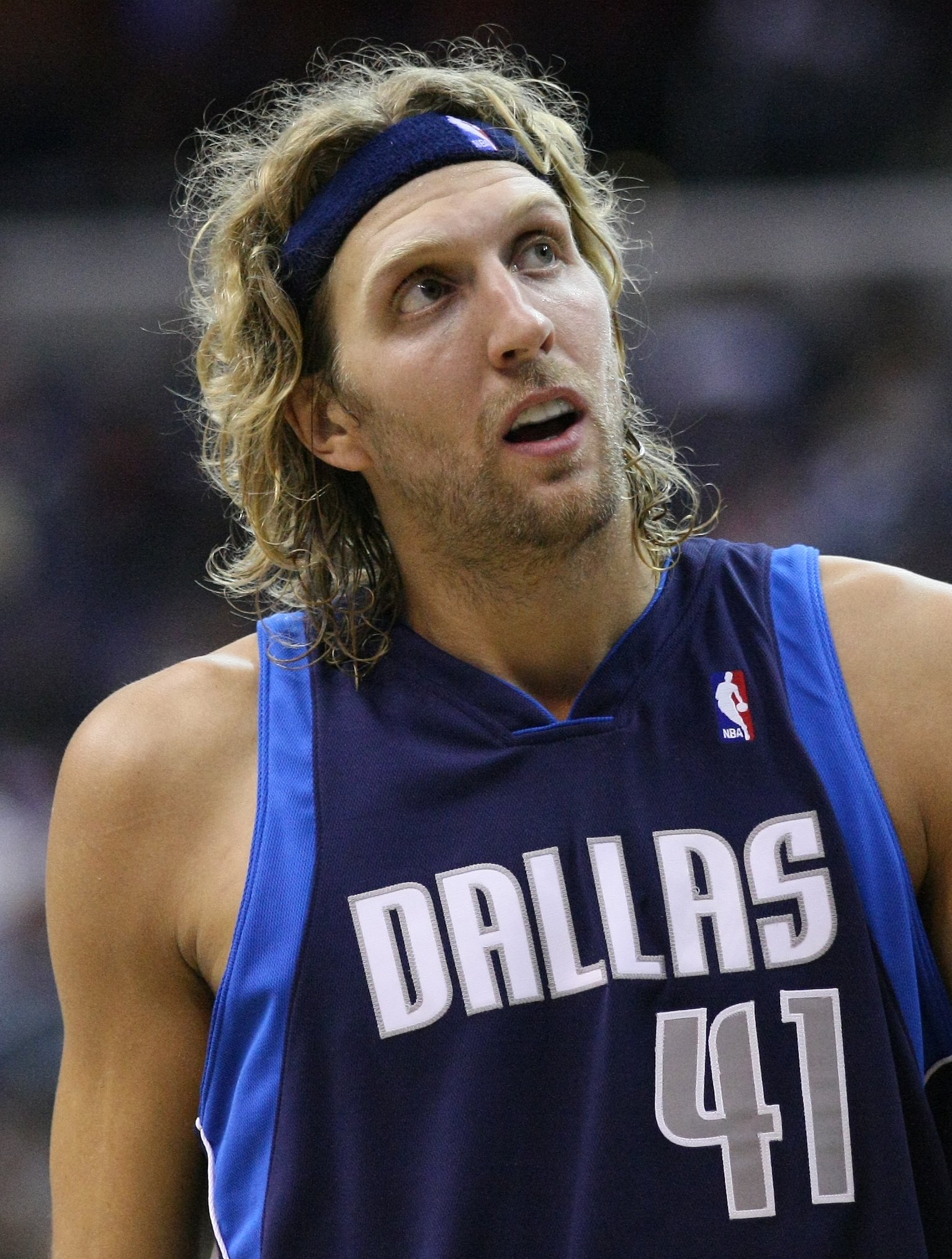
Dirk Nowitzki spent his entire 21-year career with the Dallas Mavericks, the most ever by an NBA player with one team.

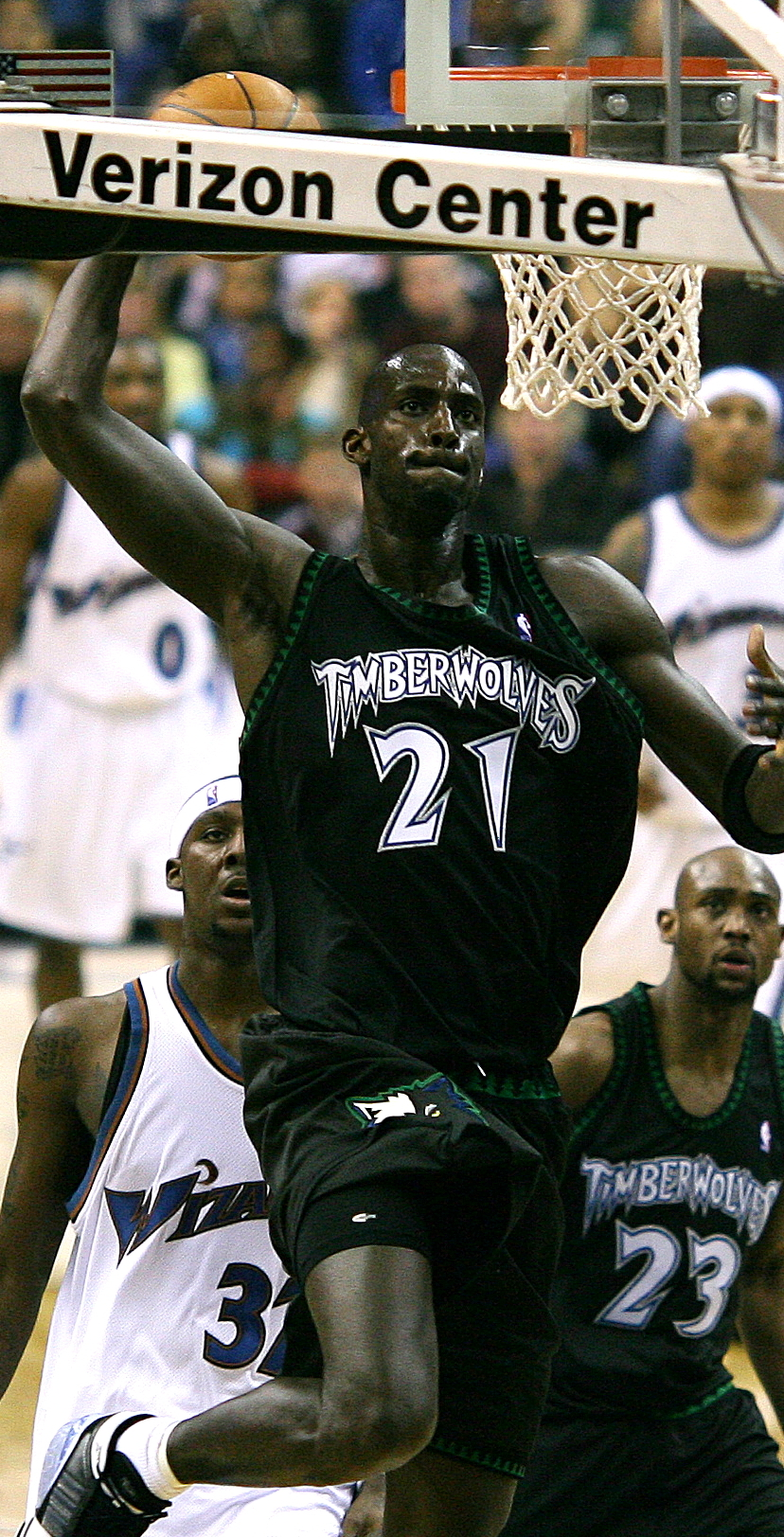
Kevin Garnett began his career with the Minnesota Timberwolves, returning later and tying the then-record of 21 seasons played in 2016.

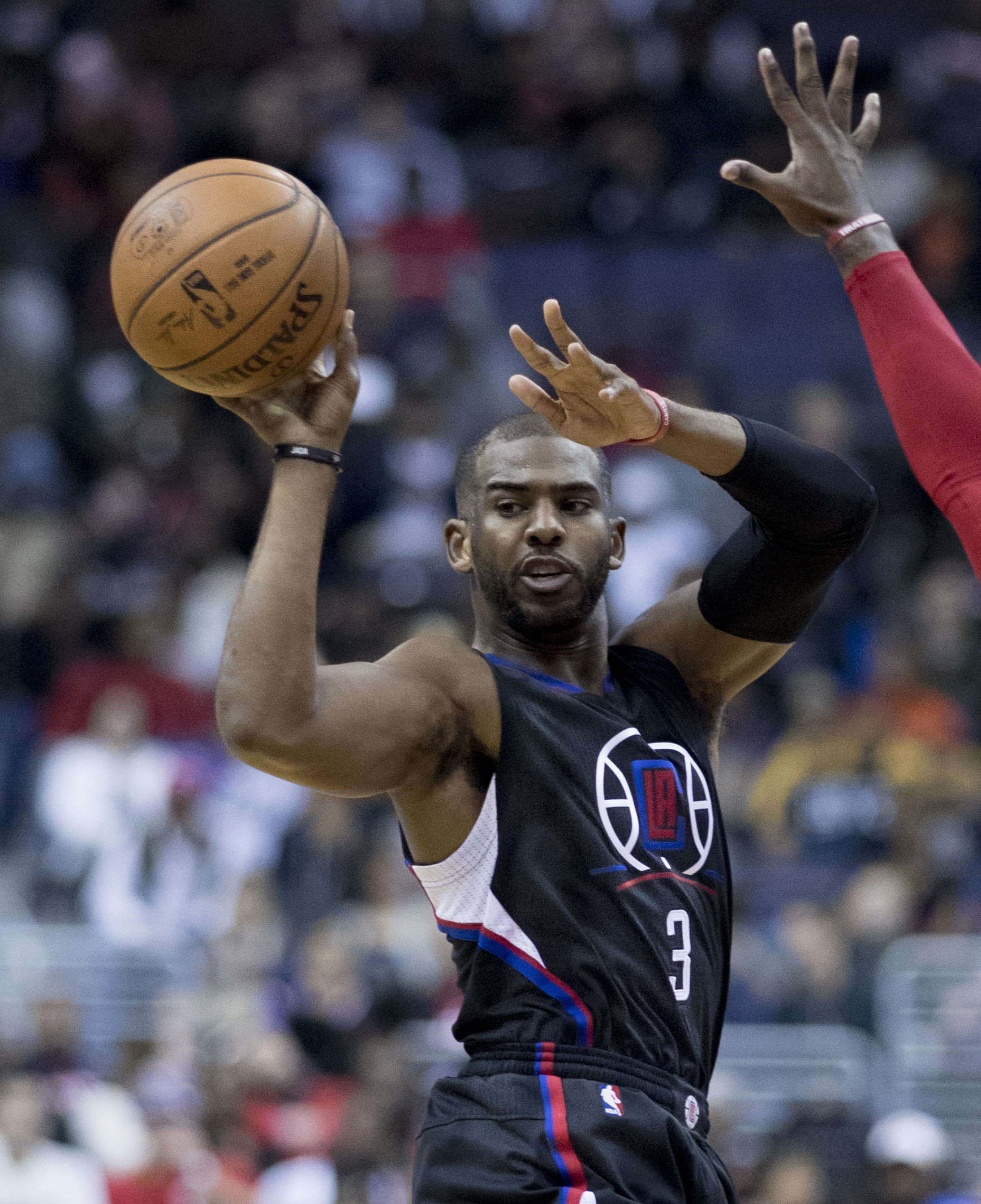
Chris Paul holds the record for the most seasons played among guards with 21 seasons.

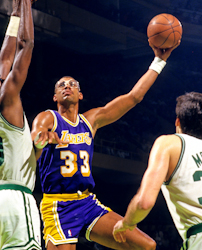
Kareem Abdul-Jabbar retired in 1989 with a then-record of 20 seasons played.

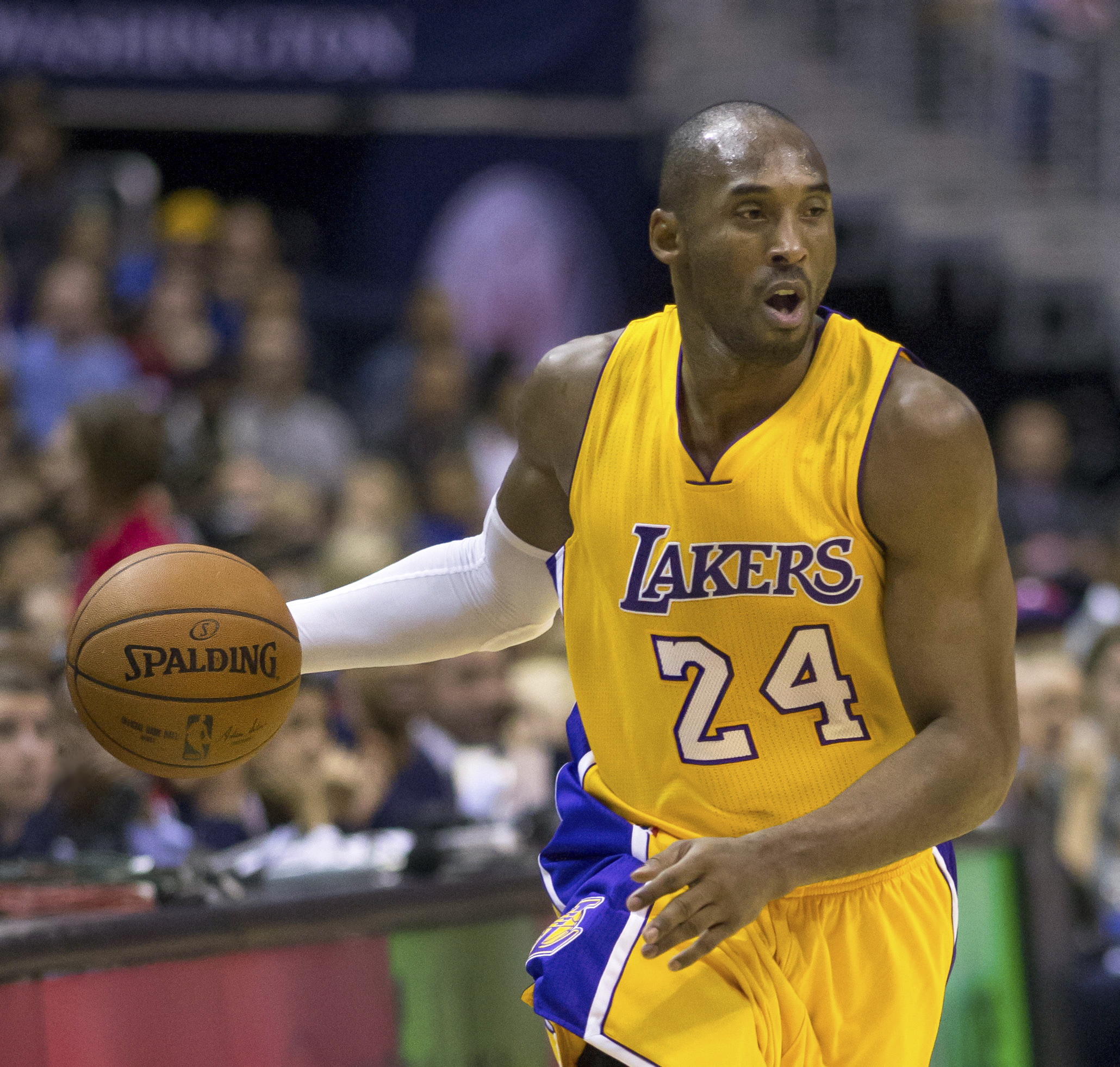
Kobe Bryant was the first guard to play 20 seasons.

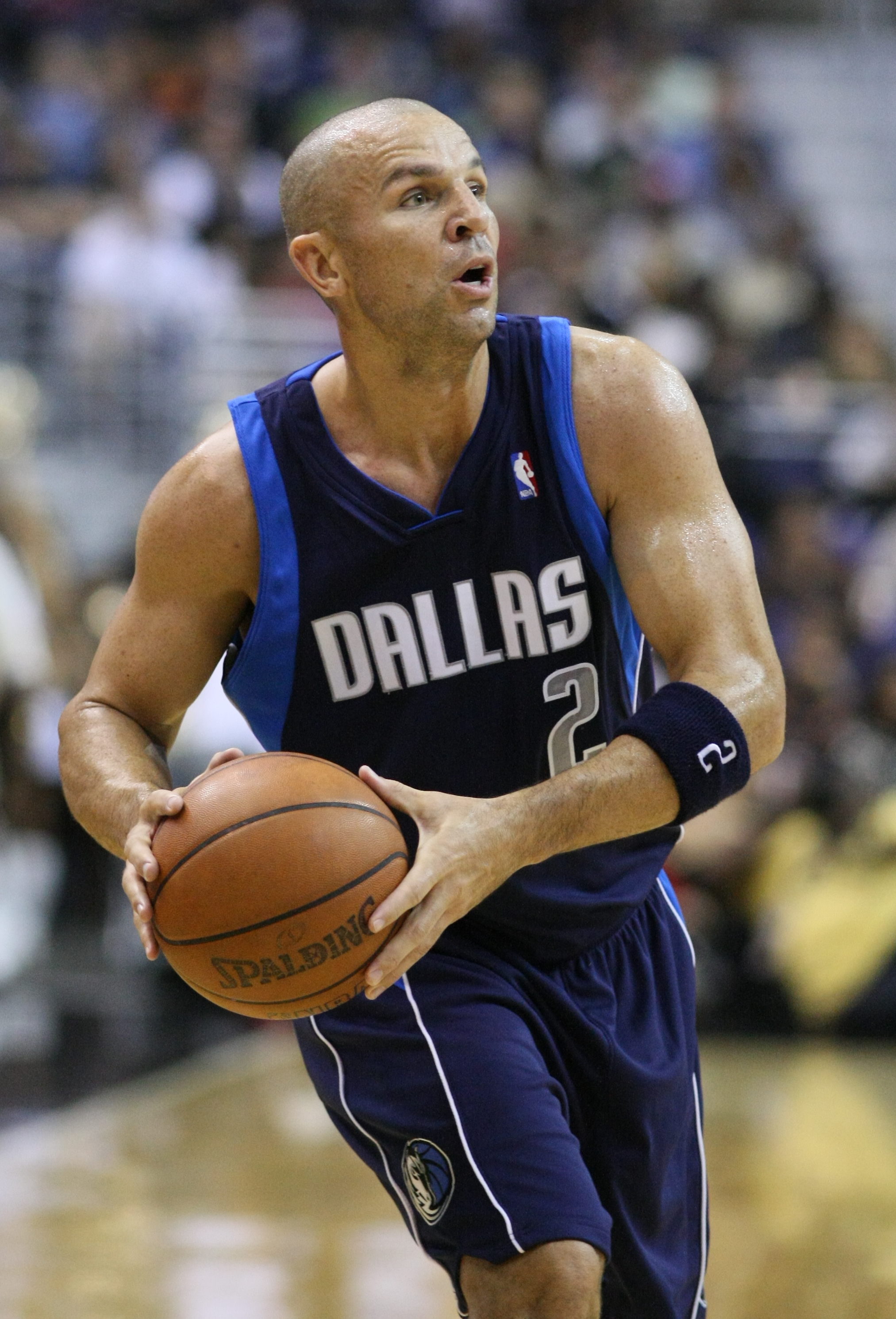
Jason Kidd had two stints with the Dallas Mavericks in his career, retiring tied with a then-record 19 seasons as a guard.

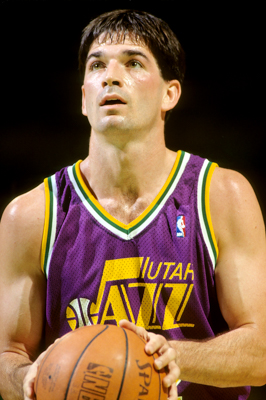
John Stockton spent all 19 years of his NBA career with the Utah Jazz, from 1984 to 2003.

^	Active NBA player
*	Inducted into the Naismith Memorial Basketball Hall of Fame
†	Not yet eligible for Hall of Fame consideration (Note: A player is not eligible for induction into the Naismith Memorial Basketball Hall of Fame until he has been fully retired for two calendar years.)
§	1st time eligible for Hall of Fame in 2027

NBA seasons played leaders
Rank	Player	Position	Team(s)	Seasons
1	LeBron James^	SF	Cleveland Cavaliers (2003–2010, 2014–2018); Miami Heat (2010–2014); Los Angeles Lakers (2018–2026); Philadelphia 76ers (2026–present)	24
2	Vince Carter*	SG / SF	Toronto Raptors (1998–2004); New Jersey Nets (2004–2009); Orlando Magic (2009–2010); Phoenix Suns (2010–2011); Dallas Mavericks (2011–2014); Memphis Grizzlies (2014–2017); Sacramento Kings (2017–2018); Atlanta Hawks (2018–2020)	22
3	Robert Parish*	C	Golden State Warriors (1976–1980); Boston Celtics (1980–1994); Charlotte Hornets (1994–1996); Chicago Bulls (1996–1997)	21
3	Kevin Willis	PF / C	Atlanta Hawks (1984–1994, 2004–2005); Miami Heat (1994–1996); Golden State Warriors (1996); Houston Rockets (1996–1998, 2001–2002); Toronto Raptors (1998–2001); Denver Nuggets (2001); San Antonio Spurs (2002–2004); Dallas Mavericks (2007)	21
3	Kevin Garnett*	PF	Minnesota Timberwolves (1995–2007, 2015–2016); Boston Celtics (2007–2013); Brooklyn Nets (2013–2015)	21
3	Dirk Nowitzki*	PF	Dallas Mavericks (1998–2019)	21
3	Chris Paul^{†}	PG	New Orleans Hornets (2005–2011); Los Angeles Clippers (2011–2017, 2025–2026); Houston Rockets (2017–2019); Oklahoma City Thunder (2019–2020); Phoenix Suns (2020–2023); Golden State Warriors (2023–2024); San Antonio Spurs (2024–2025)	21
8	Kareem Abdul-Jabbar*	C	Milwaukee Bucks (1969–1975); Los Angeles Lakers (1975–1989)	20
8	Kobe Bryant*	SG	Los Angeles Lakers (1996–2016)	20
8	Jamal Crawford	SG	Chicago Bulls (2000–2004); New York Knicks (2004–2008); Golden State Warriors (2008–2009); Atlanta Hawks (2009–2011); Portland Trail Blazers (2011–2012); Los Angeles Clippers (2012–2017); Minnesota Timberwolves (2017–2018); Phoenix Suns (2018–2019); Brooklyn Nets (2020)	20
8	Udonis Haslem	PF / C	Miami Heat (2003–2023)	20
8	Kyle Lowry^{†}	PG	Memphis Grizzlies (2006–2009); Houston Rockets (2009–2012); Toronto Raptors (2012–2021); Miami Heat (2021–2024); Philadelphia 76ers (2024–2026)	20
8	Al Horford^	C	Atlanta Hawks (2007–2016); Boston Celtics (2016–2019, 2021–2025); Philadelphia 76ers (2019–20); Oklahoma City Thunder (2020–2021); Golden State Warriors (2025–present)	20
8	Mike Conley^	PG	Memphis Grizzlies (2007–2019); Utah Jazz (2019–2023); Minnesota Timberwolves (2023–2026); Boston Celtics (2026–present)	20
15	Moses Malone*	C	Buffalo Braves (1976); Houston Rockets (1976–1982); Philadelphia 76ers (1982–1986, 1993–1994); Washington Bullets (1986–1988); Atlanta Hawks (1988–1991); Milwaukee Bucks (1991–1993); San Antonio Spurs (1994–1995)	19
15	James Edwards	C	Los Angeles Lakers (1977, 1992–1994); Indiana Pacers (1977–1981); Cleveland Cavaliers (1981–1983); Phoenix Suns (1983–1988); Detroit Pistons (1988–1991); Los Angeles Clippers (1991–1992); Portland Trail Blazers (1994–1995); Chicago Bulls (1995–1996)	19
15	John Stockton*	PG	Utah Jazz (1984–2003)	19
15	Karl Malone*	PF	Utah Jazz (1985–2003); Los Angeles Lakers (2003–2004)	19
15	Charles Oakley	PF	Chicago Bulls (1985–1988, 2001–2002); New York Knicks (1988–1998); Toronto Raptors (1998–2001); Washington Wizards (2002–2003); Houston Rockets (2004)	19
15	Shaquille O'Neal*	C	Orlando Magic (1992–1996); Los Angeles Lakers (1996–2004); Miami Heat (2004–2008); Phoenix Suns (2008–2009); Cleveland Cavaliers (2009–2010); Boston Celtics (2010–2011)	19
15	Juwan Howard	PF	Washington Bullets/Wizards (1994–2001); Dallas Mavericks (2001–2002, 2007–2008); Denver Nuggets (2002–2003, 2008); Orlando Magic (2003–2004); Houston Rockets (2004–2007); Charlotte Bobcats (2008–2009); Portland Trail Blazers (2009–2010); Miami Heat (2010–2013)	19
15	Jason Kidd*	PG	Dallas Mavericks (1994–1996, 2008–2012); Phoenix Suns (1996–2001); New Jersey Nets (2001–2008); New York Knicks (2012–2013)	19
15	Tim Duncan*	PF / C	San Antonio Spurs (1997–2016)	19
15	Paul Pierce*	SG / SF	Boston Celtics (1998–2013); Brooklyn Nets (2013–2014); Washington Wizards (2014–2015); Los Angeles Clippers (2015–2017)	19
15	Jason Terry	SG	Atlanta Hawks (1999–2004); Dallas Mavericks (2004–2012); Boston Celtics (2012–2013); Brooklyn Nets (2013–2014); Houston Rockets (2014–2016); Milwaukee Bucks (2016–2018)	19
15	Tyson Chandler	C	Chicago Bulls (2001–2006); New Orleans Hornets (2006–2009); Charlotte Bobcats (2009–2010); Dallas Mavericks (2010–2011, 2014–2015); New York Knicks (2011–2014); Phoenix Suns (2015–2018); Los Angeles Lakers (2018–2019); Houston Rockets (2019–2020)	19
15	Carmelo Anthony*	SF	Denver Nuggets (2003–2011); New York Knicks (2011–2017); Oklahoma City Thunder (2017–2018); Houston Rockets (2018–2019); Portland Trail Blazers (2019–2021); Los Angeles Lakers (2021–2022)	19
15	Andre Iguodala	SG / SF	Philadelphia 76ers (2004–2012); Denver Nuggets (2012–2013); Golden State Warriors (2013–2019, 2021–2023); Miami Heat (2020–2021)	19
15	Kevin Durant^	SF / PF	Seattle SuperSonics/Oklahoma City Thunder (2007–2016); Golden State Warriors (2016–2019); Brooklyn Nets (2019–2023); Phoenix Suns (2023–2025); Houston Rockets (2025–present)	19
15	DeAndre Jordan^	C	Los Angeles Clippers (2008–2018); Dallas Mavericks (2018–2019); New York Knicks (2019); Brooklyn Nets (2019–2021); Los Angeles Lakers (2021–2022); Philadelphia 76ers (2022); Denver Nuggets (2022–2025); New Orleans Pelicans (2025–present)	19
15	Brook Lopez^	C	New Jersey/Brooklyn Nets (2008–2017); Los Angeles Lakers (2017–2018); Milwaukee Bucks (2018–2025); Los Angeles Clippers (2025–present)	19

== See also ==
- NBA records
- List of NBA career games played leaders
- List of NBA career minutes played leaders
- List of NBA players who have spent their entire career with one franchise
- List of oldest and youngest NBA players
