= List of NBA players who have spent their entire career with one franchise =

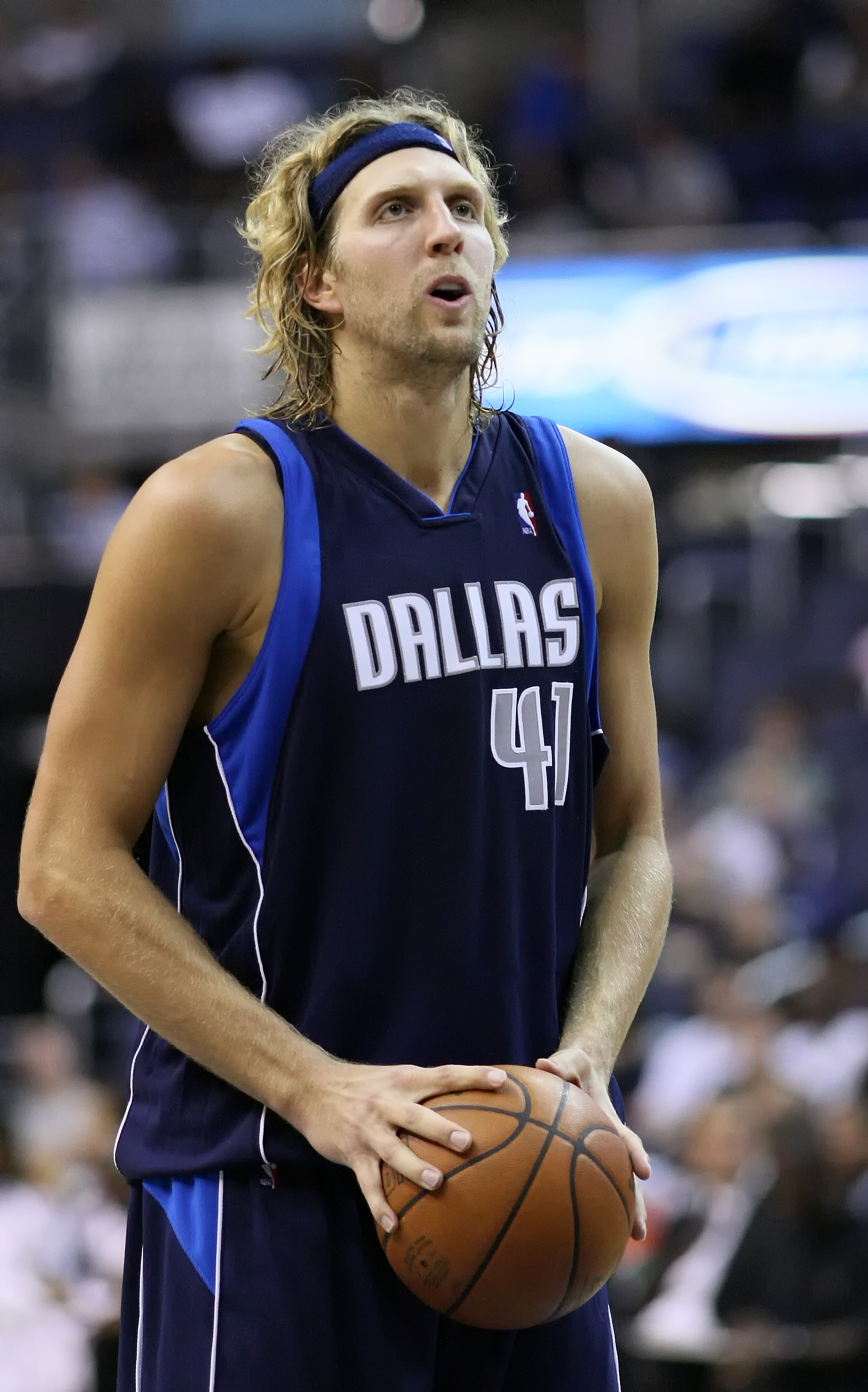
Dirk Nowitzki played 21 years with the Dallas Mavericks, the most of any NBA player with a single franchise.

The National Basketball Association (NBA) is a men's professional basketball league of 30 teams in North America (29 in the United States and one in Canada). The NBA was founded on June 6, 1946, in New York City, as the Basketball Association of America (BAA). The league adopted the NBA name at the start of the 1949–50 NBA season when it merged with the National Basketball League (NBL). The NBA is an active member of USA Basketball, which is recognized by the International Basketball Federation (FIBA) as the national governing body for basketball in the country. The league is considered to be one of the four major professional sports leagues of North America.

The NBA operates on a franchise model in a closed system with no promotion or relegation to other leagues and no affiliated academies for amateur athletes. The franchises are governed by their ownership and the NBA Board of Governors, allowing for franchises to change locations, team branding, mascots, staff and player rosters. During the NBA draft, franchises select players who have not previously held a contract in the league and have declared themselves eligible.

In the early years of the league, a player's place on the roster was primarily determined by team ownership and management. In 1970, Hall of Fame player and then-President of the NBA Players Association Oscar Robertson sued the league, putting in motion the establishment of Free Agency in 1976. With player movement now having multiple decision makers and the constraints of the NBA salary cap, a player and franchise ownership would have to agree to a continuous relationship, taking into the account the player's impact, the team's performance goals, and the financial expectations from both sides, decreasing the likelihood a player would spend more than ten years with the same team.

The players listed have spent their entire NBA career, of at least 10 seasons played, with one franchise. Dirk Nowitzki holds the record, having played all of his 21 seasons with the Dallas Mavericks. Next is Kobe Bryant, who played his entire 20-year career with the Los Angeles Lakers and Udonis Haslem, who played for the Miami Heat for all of his 20 seasons in the NBA. Hall of Famer John Stockton spent his entire 19 years playing career with the Utah Jazz, while Tim Duncan also played 19 years solely for the San Antonio Spurs and Reggie Miller spent 18 NBA seasons with the Indiana Pacers. Manu Ginobili played his entire 16 seasons with the San Antonio Spurs.

Stephen Curry is the leader among active players, having played 18 seasons with the Golden State Warriors.

== Key ==
Pos.	G	F	C
Position	Guard	Forward	Center

^	Denotes player who is still active in the NBA
*	Denotes player who has been inducted to the Basketball Hall of Fame
†	Not yet eligible for Hall of Fame consideration

== All-time list ==
NBA players who have spent their career at one franchise
Rank	Seasons	Player	Pos.	Team	Career	Notes
1	21	Dirk Nowitzki*	F	Dallas Mavericks	1998–2019	Drafted by the Milwaukee Bucks in 1998 and traded to the Dallas Mavericks. Dirk Nowitzki played for the German club DJK Würzburg from 1994 to 1998.
2	20	Kobe Bryant*	G	Los Angeles Lakers	1996–2016	Drafted by the Charlotte Hornets in 1996 and traded to the Los Angeles Lakers.
2	20	Udonis Haslem	F	Miami Heat	2003–2023	Went undrafted in 2002, but signed as a free agent with the Miami Heat a year later
4	19	Tim Duncan*	F/C	San Antonio Spurs	1997–2016	—
4	19	John Stockton*	G	Utah Jazz	1984–2003	—
6	18	Reggie Miller*	G	Indiana Pacers	1987–2005	—
6	18	Stephen Curry^	G	Golden State Warriors	2009–present	—
8	16	Manu Ginóbili*	G	San Antonio Spurs	2002–2018	Drafted by the San Antonio Spurs in 1999, but did not enter the NBA until 2002
8	16	John Havlicek*	F/G	Boston Celtics	1962–1978	—
10	15	Dolph Schayes*	F	Syracuse Nationals / Philadelphia 76ers	1949–1964	Drafted by the New York Knicks in 1948, but opted to play for the Syracuse Nationals in the NBL before moving to the NBA with the Syracuse Nationals in 1949
10	15	Hal Greer*	G	Syracuse Nationals / Philadelphia 76ers	1958–1973	—
10	15	Draymond Green^	F	Golden State Warriors	2012–present	
13	14	Nick Collison	F/C	Seattle SuperSonics/Oklahoma City Thunder	2004–2018	Drafted by the Seattle SuperSonics in 2003, however, he missed the 2003–04 NBA season due to injury
13	14	Elgin Baylor*	F	Minneapolis/Los Angeles Lakers	1958–1971	Retired in November 1971 due to injury after only playing 9 games in the 1971–72 NBA season
13	14	Jerry West*	G	Los Angeles Lakers	1960–1974	—
13	14	Joe Dumars*	G	Detroit Pistons	1985–1999	—
13	14	David Robinson*	C	San Antonio Spurs	1989–2003	Drafted by the San Antonio Spurs in 1987, but did not enter the NBA until 1989 due to his commitment with the Navy
18	13	Bill Russell*	C	Boston Celtics	1956–1969	Drafted by the St. Louis Hawks in 1956 and traded to the Boston Celtics
18	13	Satch Sanders*	F	Boston Celtics	1960–1973	—
18	13	Wes Unseld*	C	Baltimore / Capital / Washington Bullets	1968–1981	—
18	13	Calvin Murphy*	G	San Diego / Houston Rockets	1970–1983	—
18	13	Fred Brown	G	Seattle SuperSonics	1971–1984	—
18	13	Alvan Adams	C	Phoenix Suns	1975–1988	—
18	13	Larry Bird*	F	Boston Celtics	1979–1992	Drafted by the Boston Celtics in 1978, but did not enter the NBA until 1979, after his college graduation
18	13	Magic Johnson*	G	Los Angeles Lakers	1979–1991, 1996	Came out from retirement in January 1996 and played 32 games in the 1995–96 NBA season
18	13	Kevin McHale*	F	Boston Celtics	1980–1993	—
18	13	Isiah Thomas*	G	Detroit Pistons	1981–1994	—
18	13	Jeff Foster	C	Indiana Pacers	1999–2012	Drafted by the Golden State Warriors in 1999 and traded to the Indiana Pacers
30	12	Sam Jones*	G	Boston Celtics	1957–1969	—
30	12	Michael Cooper*	G	Los Angeles Lakers	1978–1990	—
30	12	James Worthy*	F	Los Angeles Lakers	1982–1994	—
30	12	Nate McMillan	G	Seattle SuperSonics	1986–1998	—
30	12	Rik Smits	C	Indiana Pacers	1988–2000	—
30	12	Nikola Jokić^	C	Denver Nuggets	2015–present	Nikola Jokić played for the Serbian club Mega Basket from 2012 to 2015.
30	12	Devin Booker^	G	Phoenix Suns	2015–present	
37	11	Bob Pettit*	F	Milwaukee / St. Louis Hawks	1954–1965	—
37	11	Jack Twyman*	F	Rochester / Cincinnati Royals	1955–1966	—
37	11	Al Attles*	G	Philadelphia / San Francisco Warriors	1960–1971	—
37	11	Rudy Tomjanovich*	F	San Diego / Houston Rockets	1970–1981	—
37	11	Julius Erving*	F	Philadelphia 76ers	1976–1987	Drafted by the Milwaukee Bucks in 1972, but opted to play in the ABA before joining the Philadelphia 76ers after the ABA–NBA merger in 1976
37	11	Mark Eaton	C	Utah Jazz	1982–1993	—
37	11	Joel Embiid^	C	Philadelphia 76ers	2016–present	Missed 2014–15 NBA season and 2015–16 NBA season in the league because of injury.
45	10	Vern Mikkelsen*	F	Minneapolis Lakers	1949–1959	—
45	10	Paul Arizin*	F	Philadelphia Warriors	1950–1952, 1954–1962	Missed the 1952–53 NBA season and 1953–54 seasons due to military service; also played for the Camden Bullets of the minor league Eastern Professional Basketball League after retiring from the NBA
45	10	Al Bianchi	G	Syracuse Nationals / Philadelphia 76ers	1956–1966	Drafted by the Minneapolis Lakers in 1954 and traded to the Syracuse Nationals, but did not enter the league until 1956 due to military service
45	10	Cliff Hagan*	F	St. Louis Hawks	1956–1966	Drafted by the Boston Celtics in 1953 and traded to the St. Louis Hawks, but did not enter the league until 1956 due to military service
45	10	Willis Reed*	C	New York Knicks	1964–1974	—
45	10	Bill Bradley*	F	New York Knicks	1967–1977	Drafted by the New York Knicks in 1965, but did not enter the NBA until 1967 due to a prior academic commitment in England; also played professional basketball overseas with the Olimpia Milano in Italy for one season before joining the New York Knicks
45	10	Tom Boerwinkle	C	Chicago Bulls	1968–1978	—
45	10	Allen Leavell	G	Houston Rockets	1979–1989	—
45	10	Darrell Griffith	G	Utah Jazz	1980–1985, 1986–1991	Missed the 1985–86 NBA season due to injury
45	10	Jamal Murray^	G	Denver Nuggets	2016–present	Missed the entire 2021–22 NBA season due to injury.
45	10	Jayson Tatum^	F	Boston Celtics	2017–present	
45	10	Bam Adebayo^	C	Miami Heat	2017–present	

== Future candidates ==
Active NBA players who have spent their career at one franchise (fewer than 10 years)
Player	Pos.	Team	Years	Draft	Seasons	Notes
Jonathan Isaac^	F	Orlando Magic	8	2017, 6th	2017–present	Missed the 2020–21 NBA season and 2021–22 NBA season due to injury.
Keldon Johnson^	F	San Antonio Spurs	8	2019, 29th	2019–present	
Zion Williamson^	F	New Orleans Pelicans	7	2019, 1st	2019–present	Missed the entire 2021–22 NBA season due to injury.
Anthony Edwards^	G	Minnesota Timberwolves	7	2020, 1st	2020–present	
Patrick Williams^	F	Chicago Bulls	7	2020, 4th	2020–present	
Onyeka Okongwu^	C	Atlanta Hawks	7	2020, 6th	2020–present	
Devin Vassell^	G	San Antonio Spurs	7	2020, 11th	2020–present	
Tyrese Maxey^	G	Philadelphia 76ers	7	2020, 21st	2020–present	
Payton Pritchard^	G	Boston Celtics	7	2020, 26th	2020–present	
Jaden McDaniels^	F	Minnesota Timberwolves	7	2020, 28th	2020–present	
Jae'Sean Tate^	F	Houston Rockets	7	2018, undrafted	2020–present	

== See also ==
- NBA records
- List of NBA seasons played leaders
- List of one-club men in association football
- List of one-club men in rugby league
- List of Major League Baseball players who spent their entire career with one franchise
- List of NHL players who spent their entire career with one franchise
- List of NFL players who spent their entire career with one franchise
