= 1990–91 Miami Heat season =

NBA professional basketball team season

- Head coach: Ron Rothstein
- General manager: Lewis Schaffel
- Owners: Ted Arison; Billy Cunningham; Lewis Schaffel
- Arena: Miami Arena

Results
- Record: 24–58 (.293)
- Place: Division: 7th (Atlantic); Conference: 14th (Eastern)
- Playoff finish: Did not qualify
- Stats at Basketball Reference

Local media
- Television: WBFS-TV; SportsChannel Florida (Sam Smith, Eric Reid)
- Radio: WQAM (Sam Smith, Eric Reid)

The 1990–91 Miami Heat season was the third season for the Miami Heat in the National Basketball Association.

== Season summary ==
=== Off-season ===
The Heat received the ninth overall pick in the 1990 NBA draft, and selected small forward Willie Burton from the University of Minnesota; the team also selected shooting guard Dave Jamerson from the University of Ohio with the 15th overall pick. The Heat originally had the third overall pick in the draft, after finishing with an 18–64 record the previous season, but traded it to the Denver Nuggets in exchange for the ninth, and 15th picks.

On draft day, the Heat made two separate trades. The team traded Jamerson and rookie power forward, and second-round draft pick, Carl Herrera from the University of Houston, to the Houston Rockets in exchange for rookie center Alec Kessler from the University of Georgia; the team also traded veteran point guard Rory Sparrow to the Sacramento Kings in exchange for rookie point guard, and second-round draft pick Bimbo Coles out of Virginia Tech. During the off-season, the Heat signed undrafted rookie small forward Keith Askins from the University of Alabama.

=== Regular season ===
With the addition of Burton, the Heat got off to a semi-promising 5–9 start to the regular season, but then continued to struggle by posting a 10-game losing streak in December. The team lost six straight games at the end of January, and later on held a 13–34 record at the All-Star break. The Heat posted an eight-game losing streak in March, lost 17 of their final 21 games of the season, and finished in last place in the Atlantic Division with a 24–58 record, which was a six-game improvement over the previous season.

Second-year guard Sherman Douglas averaged 18.5 points, 8.5 assists and 1.7 steals per game, while second-year forward Glen Rice averaged 17.4 points and 1.3 steals per game, and last season's Most Improved Player Rony Seikaly provided the team with 16.4 points, 11.1 rebounds and 1.3 blocks per game. In addition, Kevin Edwards provided with 12.1 points and 1.6 steals per game, while Burton contributed 12.0 points per game, and was named to the NBA All-Rookie Second Team, and Grant Long averaged 9.2 points, 7.1 rebounds and 1.5 steals per game. Meanwhile, Billy Thompson contributed 6.8 points and 4.3 rebounds per game, Kessler averaged 6.2 points and 4.3 rebounds per game, second-year forward Terry Davis provided with 5.5 points and 4.8 rebounds per game, and Coles contributed 4.9 points and 2.8 assists per game.

During the NBA All-Star weekend at the Charlotte Coliseum in Charlotte, North Carolina, Rice participated in the NBA Three-Point Shootout. The Heat finished 15th in the NBA in home-game attendance, with an attendance of 615,328 at the Miami Arena during the regular season.

=== Aftermath ===
Following the season, Thompson was released to free agency, and head coach Ron Rothstein resigned after three seasons with the franchise.

== Draft picks ==
Round	Pick	Player	Position	Nationality	College
1	9	Willie Burton	SF	United States	Minnesota
1	15	Dave Jamerson	SG	United States	Ohio
2	30	Carl Herrera	PF	Venezuela	Houston

== Roster ==
1990–91 Miami Heat roster
Players

Pos.	No.	Player	Height	Weight	DOB	From
F	2	Keith Askins	6 ft 7 in (2.01 m)	197 lb (89 kg)	1967–12–15	Alabama
F	34	Willie Burton	6 ft 8 in (2.03 m)	210 lb (95 kg)	1968–05–26	Minnesota
G	12	Bimbo Coles	6 ft 1 in (1.85 m)	180 lb (82 kg)	1968–04–22	Virginia Tech
F	44	Terry Davis	6 ft 9 in (2.06 m)	225 lb (102 kg)	1967–06–17	Virginia Union
G	11	Sherman Douglas	6 ft 0 in (1.83 m)	180 lb (82 kg)	1966–09–15	Syracuse
G	21	Kevin Edwards	6 ft 3 in (1.91 m)	190 lb (86 kg)	1965–10–30	DePaul
F/C	33	Alec Kessler	6 ft 11 in (2.11 m)	230 lb (104 kg)	1967–01–13	Georgia
F	43	Grant Long	6 ft 8 in (2.03 m)	225 lb (102 kg)	1966–03–12	Eastern Michigan
C	53	Alan Ogg	7 ft 2 in (2.18 m)	240 lb (109 kg)	1967–07–05	UAB
F	41	Glen Rice	6 ft 7 in (2.01 m)	215 lb (98 kg)	1967–05–28	Michigan
C	4	Rony Seikaly	6 ft 11 in (2.11 m)	230 lb (104 kg)	1965–05–10	Syracuse
G	20	Jon Sundvold	6 ft 2 in (1.88 m)	170 lb (77 kg)	1961–07–02	Missouri
F	55	Billy Thompson	6 ft 7 in (2.01 m)	195 lb (88 kg)	1963–12–01	Louisville

Coaches
Head coach
- Ron Rothstein
Assistant(s)
- Tony Fiorentino
- Dave Wohl

Legend
- (DP) Unsigned draft pick
- (FA) Free agent
- (S) Suspended
- Injured

Roster
Updated: January 27, 1991

== Regular season ==
=== Season standings ===
Atlantic Division	W	L	PCT	GB	Home	Road	Div
y-Boston Celtics	56	26	.683	—	35–6	21–20	20-6
x-Philadelphia 76ers	44	38	.537	12	29-12	15-26	14-12
x-New York Knicks	39	43	.476	17	21-20	18-23	17–9
Washington Bullets	30	52	.366	26	21-20	9-32	10-16
New Jersey Nets	26	56	.317	30	20-21	6–35	8-18
Miami Heat	24	58	.293	32	18-23	6-35	9-17

y – clinched division title
x – clinched playoff spot

#	Eastern Conference				
#	Team	W	L	PCT	GB
1	c-Chicago Bulls	61	21	.744	–
2	y-Boston Celtics	56	26	.683	5
3	x-Detroit Pistons	50	32	.610	11
4	x-Milwaukee Bucks	48	34	.585	13
5	x-Philadelphia 76ers	44	38	.537	17
6	x-Atlanta Hawks	43	39	.524	18
7	x-Indiana Pacers	41	41	.500	20
8	x-New York Knicks	39	43	.476	22
9	Cleveland Cavaliers	33	49	.402	28
10	Washington Bullets	30	52	.366	31
11	New Jersey Nets	26	56	.317	35
12	Charlotte Hornets	26	56	.317	35
13	Miami Heat	24	58	.293	37

z – clinched division title
y – clinched division title
x – clinched playoff spot

== Player statistics ==
=== Ragular season ===
Player	POS	GP	GS	MP	REB	AST	STL	BLK	PTS	MPG	RPG	APG	SPG	BPG	PPG
Bimbo Coles	PG	82	9	1,355	153	232	65	12	401	16.5	1.9	2.8	.8	.1	4.9
Grant Long	PF	80	66	2,514	568	176	119	43	734	31.4	7.1	2.2	1.5	.5	9.2
Kevin Edwards	SG	79	16	2,000	205	240	129	46	955	25.3	2.6	3.0	1.6	.6	12.1
Alec Kessler	C	78	18	1,259	336	31	17	26	486	16.1	4.3	.4	.2	.3	6.2
Glen Rice	SF	77	77	2,646	381	189	101	26	1,342	34.4	4.9	2.5	1.3	.3	17.4
Willie Burton	SF	76	26	1,928	262	107	72	24	915	25.4	3.4	1.4	.9	.3	12.0
Sherman Douglas	PG	73	73	2,562	209	624	121	5	1,352	35.1	2.9	8.5	1.7	.1	18.5
Billy Thompson	SF	73	46	1,481	312	111	32	48	499	20.3	4.3	1.5	.4	.7	6.8
Rony Seikaly	C	64	59	2,171	709	95	51	86	1,050	33.9	11.1	1.5	.8	1.3	16.4
Terry Davis	PF	55	17	996	266	39	18	28	300	18.1	4.8	.7	.3	.5	5.5
Keith Askins	SF	39	1	266	68	19	16	13	86	6.8	1.7	.5	.4	.3	2.2
Alan Ogg	C	31	1	261	49	2	6	27	54	8.4	1.6	.1	.2	.9	17
Jon Sundvold	SG	24	0	225	9	24	7	0	112	9.4	.4	1.0	.3	.0	4.7
Milt Wagner	SG	13	1	116	7	15	2	3	63	8.9	.5	1.2	.2	.2	4.8

== Awards and records ==
- Willie Burton, NBA All-Rookie Team 2nd Team
