= Glen Rice =

American basketball player (born 1967)

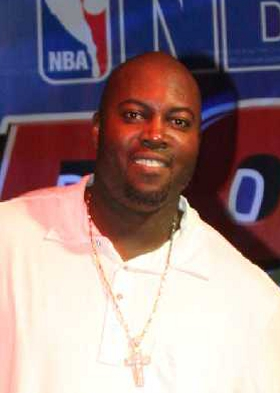
- Rice in 2010

Personal information
- Born: May 28, 1967 (age 59) Jacksonville, Arkansas, U.S.
- Listed height: 6 ft 8 in (2.03 m)
- Listed weight: 228 lb (103 kg)

Career information
- High school: Flint Northwestern (Flint, Michigan)
- College: Michigan (1985–1989)
- NBA draft: 1989: 1st round, 4th overall pick
- Drafted by: Miami Heat
- Playing career: 1989–2004
- Position: Small forward
- Number: 41

Career history
- 1989–1995: Miami Heat
- 1995–1999: Charlotte Hornets
- 1999–2000: Los Angeles Lakers
- 2000–2001: New York Knicks
- 2001–2003: Houston Rockets
- 2003–2004: Los Angeles Clippers

Career highlights
- NBA champion (2000); 3× NBA All-Star (1996–1998); NBA All-Star Game MVP (1997); All-NBA Second Team (1997); All-NBA Third Team (1998); NBA All-Rookie Second Team (1990); NBA Three-Point Contest champion (1995); NCAA champion (1989); NCAA Final Four Most Outstanding Player (1989); Consensus second-team All-American (1989); Big Ten Player of the Year (1989); Big Ten Male Athlete of the Year (1989); No. 41 retired by Michigan Wolverines; Fourth-team Parade All-American (1985); Mr. Basketball of Michigan (1985)

Career NBA statistics
- Points: 18,336 (18.3 ppg)
- Rebounds: 4,387 (4.4 rpg)
- Assists: 2,097 (2.1 apg)
- Stats at NBA.com
- Stats at Basketball Reference
- Collegiate Basketball Hall of Fame

Glen Anthony Rice Sr. (born May 28, 1967) is an American former professional basketball player who played in the National Basketball Association (NBA). As a small forward, Rice was a three-time NBA All-Star and made 1,559 three-point field goals during his 15-year career. Rice played college basketball for the Michigan Wolverines, and was selected by the Miami Heat with the fourth overall pick in the 1989 NBA draft. He won an NCAA championship in 1989 and an NBA championship in 2000. In recent years, Rice has taken up mixed martial arts fight promotion as owner of G-Force Fights based in Miami, Florida, and is an NBA scout and team ambassador for the Miami Heat. He is the father of Glen Rice Jr.

== Early life ==
Glen Anthony Rice Sr. was born on May 28, 1967, in Jacksonville, Arkansas. He and his family moved to Benton, Arkansas when Rice was only a few months old. While they lived in Benton, Rice attended both Angie Grant elementary school and Howard Perrin elementary school. When Rice was 12, the family moved to Flint, Michigan. Rice was a star on the Flint Northwestern High School record setting 1984 and 1985 varsity basketball teams. Rice lead those teams to a combined 55-1 record and consecutive Class A Michigan state titles. After graduating high school in 1985, Rice enrolled at the University of Michigan.

== College career ==
Rice played college basketball for the University of Michigan Wolverines for four seasons (1985–1989), a starter for three of those seasons. He became the school's all-time leading scorer with 2,442 points. He led Michigan to the 1989 NCAA Men's Division I Basketball Championship, scoring an NCAA-record 184 points in tournament play, a record that still stands. Rice was also voted the tournament's Most Outstanding Player and was part of the Associated Press All-America second-team, after averaging 25.6 points for the season, while shooting 58% from the floor and 52% from three-point range. After Rice's junior year, he was invited to try out for the 1988 United States Olympic basketball team, but he was cut before reaching the group of 48. On February 20, 2005, Rice's No. 41 jersey was retired during a ceremony at Michigan's Crisler Arena. Rice made the cover of Sports Illustrated on April 10, 1989.

In 2026, Rice was inducted into the National Collegiate Basketball Hall of Fame. He became the third Wolverine to ever earn the honor, joining head coach John Beilein and Cazzie Russell.

Rice continues to rank among Michigan's all-time leaders in several statistical categories, including:

- 1st in men's career points (2,442)
- 1st in single-season points (949 in the 1988–89 season)
- 1st in single-season field goals made (363 in the 1988–89 season)
- 1st in single-season field goal attempts (629 in the 1988–89 season)
- 1st in single-season three-point field goal percent (51.6% in the 1988–89 season)
- 2nd in career field goals made (1,003)
- 2nd in single-season three-point field goals made (99 in the 1988–89 season)

== Professional career ==
Rice started his senior season as a projected mid-first-round selection, but his stock rose due to his record-breaking performance in the NCAA Tournament, and he was selected #4 overall in the 1989 NBA draft by the Miami Heat.

=== Miami Heat (1989–1995) ===
The Heat was an expansion team in the NBA and was now in their second-year in need of some offensive help after finishing last in the NBA in points per game in 1988–89. Joining other young players such as Sherman Douglas and Rony Seikaly, Rice would be called upon to deliver some of the scoring load despite being a rookie. Starting in 60 games, Rice averaged 13.6 points per game his rookie season just behind Douglas and Seikaly, but the lottery-bound Heat only won 18 games. The following year only saw modest improvement for the team from 18 wins to 24 wins, but Rice started in every game he played and increased his scoring load to 17.4 points a game while leading the team in three-point field goals with 71.

The 1991–92 season would prove to be a breakthrough season for Rice and the Heat, as the team improved to 38 wins and featured other young players such as Steve Smith and Brian Shaw. By now Rice had become the team's leading scorer and averaged 22.3 points a game with 155 three-point field goals (second in the league), leading the Heat to its first playoff series in which the young team was swept by the defending champion Chicago Bulls led by Michael Jordan. Despite this, the Heat won fewer games the following year, while Rice's scoring average slipped to 19 as the scoring load of Seikaly and Smith increased.

Rice averaged 21.1 points a game in the 1993–94 season and led the Heat back into the playoffs and to their first-ever playoff game win against the Atlanta Hawks, but the Heat were unable to win the hard-fought first-round series in which the Hawks prevailed 3 games to 2.

In the 1994–95 season, Rice averaged 22.3 points a game (10th in the league) and made 185 three-point shots (6th in the league). Despite not being selected to play in the annual NBA All-Star Game, Rice participated in the NBA All-Star Long Distance Shootout at the 1995 All-Star game in Phoenix, and won the contest, edging out another sharp-shooter, Reggie Miller. Later during the season in a nationally televised game against Shaquille O'Neal and the Orlando Magic he scored a career-high 56 points on 20 of 27 shots from the floor including 7 three-pointers. The 56 points were an NBA season-high for the 1994–95 season. Despite his success, the Heat was unable to make the playoffs.

=== Charlotte Hornets (1995–1999) ===
Days before the start of the 1995–96 season, newly hired Coach/GM Pat Riley organized a trade in which Rice was sent to the Charlotte Hornets along with Matt Geiger in exchange for disgruntled Hornets center Alonzo Mourning who had refused any contract negotiations.

The Hornets paired Rice with high scoring forward Larry Johnson, and the two led the team to 41 wins. Rice led the team in scoring with 21.6 points a game and led his team in three-point field goals (171) and three-point shooting percentage (42%). He was also named to play in the 1996 NBA All-Star Game, but the Hornets failed to make the playoffs.

It would be the 1996–97 season in which Rice would earn the distinction of an elite player in the league. The Hornets had acquired veteran players Vlade Divac and Anthony Mason and no longer featured Johnson, and also hiring a new head coach and NBA legend Dave Cowens. Rice averaged 26.8 points a game during the season, placing him third in the league in scoring while leading the league in three-point shooting (47%) and minutes played. His play earned him his second straight All-Star Game election, and at the 1997 NBA All-Star Game set an individual All-Star game records of 20 points in the third quarter and 24 points in the second half to finish with 26 points for the game. His 8–11 shooting performance including 4–5 three-pointer shooting and his 20 points in the third quarter broke Philadelphia guard Hal Greer's record (19), set in 1968. By scoring 24 in a half, Rice surpassed the previous mark of 23, owned by Wilt Chamberlain and Tom Chambers. Rice's performance is listed on the NBA's 57 Memorable All-Star Moments. His performance helped the Eastern Conference win the game, and earned him the NBA All-Star Game Most Valuable Player Award. The Hornets won 54 games, and made it into the 1997 Playoffs where they were swept 3–0 by the New York Knicks in the first round.

Rice would average 22.3 points a game (8th in the league) during the 1997–98 season, finishing second in the league in minutes played and scoring 16 points in the 1998 NBA All-Star Game. The Hornets won 51 games, and in the first round of the 1998 Playoffs, they managed to win a playoff series, defeating the Atlanta Hawks before losing to the defending champion Chicago Bulls in the second round. The 1998–99 season would start late and last only 50 games per team due to a league lockout, and on March 10, 1999, the Hornets traded Rice to the Los Angeles Lakers.

=== Los Angeles Lakers (1999–2000) ===
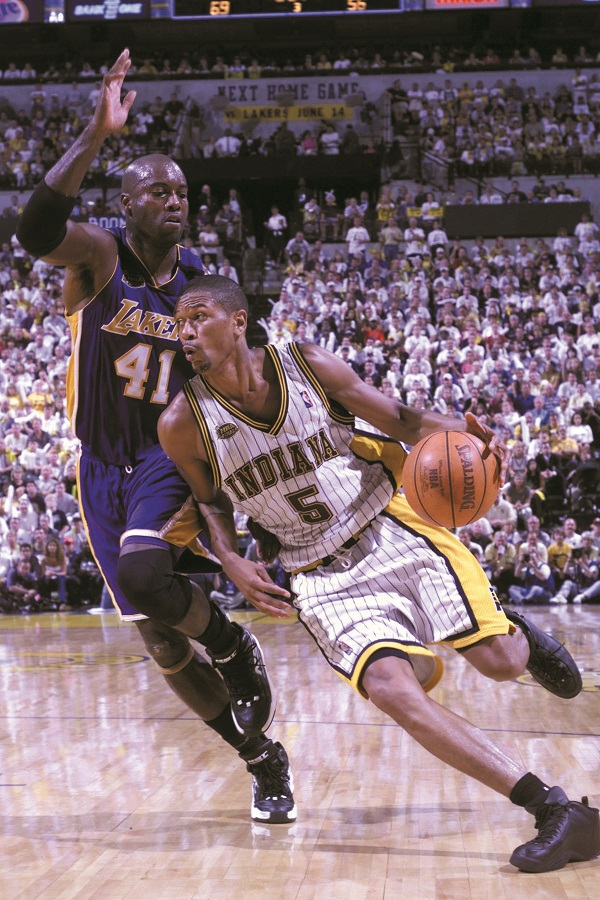
Rice defending Jalen Rose.

In 1999, Rice was again traded in exchange for fan favorite, Eddie Jones and Elden Campbell. The trade did not immediately sit well with Laker fans but Rice was considered the last piece of the puzzle for the Lakers to return to the NBA Finals. Rice was leaving a Hornets team in turmoil with many players demanding trades coming out of a 4-month lockout. Coach Cowens had resigned, Anthony Mason was out for the year, Rice was coming back from an elbow injury that he needed to have surgery on, and the owner was in legal trouble. The trade to the Lakers made Rice the third scorer behind Shaquille O'Neal and Kobe Bryant, a trio that general manager and Laker legend Jerry West envisioned would bring Los Angeles another NBA championship. The Lakers were swept by the San Antonio Spurs in the 1999 Playoffs, but Rice averaged 18 points per game.

Before the 1999–2000 season, the Lakers hired head coach Phil Jackson, who had won 6 NBA Championships with the Chicago Bulls teams that featured Michael Jordan and Scottie Pippen. The Lakers also acquired veterans such as Ron Harper, A.C. Green, as well as Rice's former Miami teammates John Salley and Brian Shaw. Led by the play of O'Neal, who won the MVP award for the season, and the all-star play of Bryant, the Lakers won 67 games for first place in the Western Conference. Rice started in 80 games and averaged 15.9 points as the team's third option with 84 three-point shots to lead the Lakers.

In the 2000 Playoffs, Rice averaged 12.4 points per game while shooting 41 percent from beyond the three-point arc, a career-best for the playoffs. The Lakers defeated the Sacramento Kings, Phoenix Suns, and Portland Trail Blazers in the first three rounds of the playoffs en route to advancing to the 2000 NBA Finals to play the Indiana Pacers. In the second game of the Finals, Bryant suffered an ankle injury, and Rice scored 21 points to help the Lakers take a 2–0 lead in the series. Rice would average 11.5 points a game for the series, including 16 points with 3 shots from three-point range in Game 6 as the Lakers defeated the Pacers 4 games to 2 to give Rice his first and only NBA championship.

Although the Lakers had won the championship, a lot of drama had unfolded behind the scenes between Rice, head coach Phil Jackson and GM Jerry West since the time between getting swept by the Spurs and the eventual championship. There was a report that Rice was upset when the Lakers exercised a $7-million option for 1999–2000 instead of letting him become a free agent. Shaquille O'Neal, Rice's close friend, believed that Rice was the pure shooter he needed to keep teams from double- and triple-teaming him in the playoffs, and felt partly responsible for bringing Rice to the Lakers (and trading Eddie Jones to do it). Rice was eventually traded to the New York Knicks.

=== New York Knicks (2000–2001) ===
In New York, Rice would take on a sixth-man role on the team and provide the Knicks with well-needed support off the bench. In the 2000–01 season he played in 72 games, averaging 12 points-per-game. Rice made 25 starts, averaging 14.2 points and 5.2 rebounds in those games and led the Knicks in scoring 9 times. While Rice's defense is often singled out as the reason for his departure, he ranks 145th among all-time NBA players in career steals (958). His tenure with the Knicks lasted only one year, as he was hobbled by a foot injury (plantar fasciitis) and was unable to find a niche in New York behind Allan Houston and Latrell Sprewell. After the season in which the Knicks lost in five games to the Toronto Raptors in the first round of the 2001 Playoffs, he would eventually be traded to the Houston Rockets for Shandon Anderson.

=== Houston Rockets (2001–2003) ===
In Houston, Rice joined a young team featuring Steve Francis and Cuttino Mobley and was initially excited about returning to a starting role after being relegated to more of a third-option with both the Lakers and Knicks. Things started slowly in Houston as Rice was still on the mend, rehabbing from his foot injury which limited him to just 20 games in the 2001–02 season. The following year, he would manage to play in 62 games including 26 starts to average 9 points a game for a Rockets team that now featured center Yao Ming. Following the 2003 season he would be traded to the Utah Jazz for John Amaechi, but would then sign with the Los Angeles Clippers.

=== Los Angeles Clippers (2003–2004) ===
A knee injury (partially torn tendon) ultimately derailed and eventually brought Rice's career to an end. In his final season with the Clippers, he became the 48th player in NBA history to score 18,000 career points. Fittingly, it was on February 18, 2004, against the Lakers, and he would retire after playing just 18 games.

== NBA career statistics ==
Legend
GP	Games played	GS	Games started	MPG	Minutes per game
FG%	Field goal percentage	3P%	3-point field goal percentage	FT%	Free throw percentage
RPG	Rebounds per game	APG	Assists per game	SPG	Steals per game
BPG	Blocks per game	PPG	Points per game	**Bold**	Career high
†	Won an NBA championship	*	Led the league	‡	NBA record

=== Regular season ===
Year	Team	GP	GS	MPG	FG%	3P%	FT%	RPG	APG	SPG	BPG	PPG
1989–90	Miami	77	60	30.0	.439	.246	.734	4.6	1.8	0.9	**0.4**	13.6
1990–91	Miami	77	77	34.4	.461	.386	.818	4.9	2.5	1.3	0.3	17.4
1991–92	Miami	79	79	38.1	.469	.391	.836	5.0	2.3	1.1	**0.4**	22.3
1992–93	Miami	**82**	**82**	37.6	.440	.383	.820	5.2	2.2	1.1	0.3	19.0
1993–94	Miami	81	81	37.0	.467	.382	.880	**5.4**	2.3	**1.4**	**0.4**	21.1
1994–95	Miami	**82***	**82***	36.8	.475	.410	.855	4.6	2.3	**1.4**	0.2	22.3
1995–96	Charlotte	79	79	39.8	.471	.424	.837	4.8	**2.9**	1.2	0.2	21.6
1996–97	Charlotte	79	78	**42.6**	**.477**	**.470***	.867	4.0	2.0	0.9	0.3	**26.8**
1997–98	Charlotte	**82***	**82***	40.2	.457	.433	.849	4.3	2.2	0.9	0.3	22.3
1998–99	L.A. Lakers	27	25	36.5	.432	.393	.856	3.7	2.6	0.6	0.2	17.5
1999–00†	L.A. Lakers	80	80	31.6	.430	.367	.874	4.1	2.2	0.6	0.2	15.9
2000–01	New York	75	25	29.5	.440	.389	.852	4.1	1.2	0.5	0.2	12.0
2001–02	Houston	20	20	30.3	.389	.281	.800	2.4	1.6	0.6	0.2	8.6
2002–03	Houston	62	26	24.7	.429	.398	.759	2.5	1.0	0.4	0.1	9.0
2003–04	L.A. Clippers	18	0	14.6	.289	.179	**1.000**	2.3	1.3	0.3	0.0	3.7
Career		1,000	876	35.0	.456	.400	.846	4.4	2.1	1.0	0.3	18.3
All Star		3	0	18.7	.395	.600‡	1.000	1.0	1.0	0.7	0.0	16.3

=== Playoffs ===
Year	Team	GP	GS	MPG	FG%	3P%	FT%	RPG	APG	SPG	BPG	PPG
1992	Miami	3	3	39.7	.375	.250	.857	3.3	1.7	0.7	0.0	19.0
1994	Miami	5	5	39.0	.382	.304	.750	**7.2**	2.0	**2.2**	**0.4**	13.0
1997	Charlotte	3	3	**45.7**	**.491**	.375	.913	3.7	**3.7**	1.3	0.3	**27.7**
1998	Charlotte	9	9	41.0	.474	.306	.833	5.7	1.4	0.6	0.3	22.8
1999	L.A. Lakers	7	7	43.9	.446	.357	**.966**	3.9	1.6	0.7	0.1	18.3
2000†	L.A. Lakers	**23**	**23**	33.3	.408	.418	.798	4.0	2.1	0.7	0.2	12.4
2001	New York	5	0	28.8	.462	**.429**	.875	4.4	0.6	0.6	0.2	12.2
Career		55	50	37.0	.433	.362	.845	4.5	1.8	0.8	0.2	16.1

== Personal life ==
A book claimed that Rice had an alleged affair with Sarah Palin in 1987, which Rice said was a "respectful encounter".

Rice's son, Glen Rice Jr. (born January 1, 1991), was selected by the Philadelphia 76ers with the 35th overall pick of the 2013 NBA draft.

Rice also has five other children: G'mitri Rice (born April 22, 1992), Brianna Rice (born February 26, 1999), Giancarlo Rice (born August 28, 2001), Giovanni Rice (born February 5, 2004) and Bella Rice (born July 28, 2010).

On January 11, 2008, Rice was arrested in Miami on suspicion of felony battery. Police say he assaulted a man that he found hiding in his estranged wife's closet. Rice surrendered to police and was released after posting $5,000 bond. Charges were later dropped by the victim J.C.

On April 28, 2016, Rice married his longtime girlfriend and youngest daughter's mother, Tia Santoro, at Vizcaya Museum and Gardens in Miami.

== Awards ==
- NBA champion (2000)
- NBA All-Star Game MVP (1997)
- NCAA Final Four Most Outstanding Player (1989)
- NCAA champion (1989)
- 3-time All-Star
- 2-time All-NBA — 1997 second team, 1998 third team
- NBA Three-Point Shootout champion (1995)
- NBA All-Rookie Second Team (1990)
- Retired Jerseys: #41 University of Michigan

== See also ==
- List of NBA career 3-point field goal percentage leaders
