= 1993–94 Miami Heat season =

NBA professional basketball team season

- Head coach: Kevin Loughery
- General manager: Lewis Schaffel
- Owners: Ted Arison; Billy Cunningham; Lewis Schaffel
- Arena: Miami Arena

Results
- Record: 42–40 (.512)
- Place: Division: 4th (Atlantic); Conference: 8th (Eastern)
- Playoff finish: First round (lost to Hawks 2–3)
- Stats at Basketball Reference

Local media
- Television: WBFS-TV; Sunshine Network
- Radio: WINZ

The 1993–94 Miami Heat season was the sixth season for the Miami Heat in the National Basketball Association.

== Season summary ==
=== Off-season ===
During the off-season, the Heat signed free agent 7' 7" center Manute Bol, but released him to free agency after only just eight games.

=== Regular season ===
The Heat got off to a slow start by losing six of their first nine games of the regular season, but then won 13 of their next 20 games, leading to a 16–13 start to the season. However, the team struggled posting a seven-game losing streak in January afterwards, and later on held a 23–24 record at the All-Star break. The Heat posted a seven-game winning streak between February and March, but then lost 13 of their final 18 games of the season, finishing in fourth place in the Atlantic Division with a 42–40 record, which was their first ever winning record above .500 in winning percentage; the team earned the eighth seed in the Eastern Conference, and qualified for their second NBA playoff appearance.

Glen Rice averaged 21.1 points, 5.4 rebounds and 1.4 steals per game, and also led the Heat with 132 three-point field goals, while Steve Smith averaged 17.3 points and 5.1 assists per game, and Rony Seikaly provided the team with 15.1 points, 10.3 rebounds and 1.4 blocks per game. In addition, Grant Long averaged 11.4 points, 7.2 rebounds and 1.3 steals per game, while second-year guard Harold Miner contributed 10.5 points per game, but only played 63 games due to a knee injury, and Brian Shaw contributed 9.0 points and 5.0 assists per game. Meanwhile, John Salley averaged 7.7 points and 5.4 rebounds per game, while off the bench, Bimbo Coles contributed 7.7 points and 3.5 assists per game, and second-year center Matt Geiger provided with 7.2 points and 4.2 rebounds per game.

During the NBA All-Star weekend at the Target Center in Minneapolis, Minnesota, Miner was selected to participate in the NBA Slam Dunk Contest, in which he won the previous year; however, he did not participate this year due to injury, and was replaced with Allan Houston of the Detroit Pistons. The Heat finished 16th in the NBA in home-game attendance, with an attendance of 617,242 at the Miami Arena during the regular season.

=== NBA playoffs ===
In the Eastern Conference First Round of the 1994 NBA playoffs, the Heat faced off against the top–seeded, and Central Division champion Atlanta Hawks, who were led by Kevin Willis, All-Star forward Danny Manning, and All-Star guard Mookie Blaylock. On April 28, 1994, the Heat won their first ever NBA playoff game in franchise history, defeating the Hawks in Game 1 on the road, 93–88 at the Omni Coliseum. With the series tied at 1–1, the Heat won Game 3 over the Hawks at home, 90–86 at the Miami Arena to take a 2–1 series lead. However, the Heat lost the next two games to the Hawks, losing Game 4 at home, 103–89, and then losing Game 5 at the Omni Coliseum, 102–91, thus losing in a hard-fought five-game series.

=== Notable incidents ===
One notable incident of the NBA playoffs occurred during Game 2 of the Eastern Conference First Round, against the Hawks at the Omni Coliseum. A brawl occurred in which Long choked Hawks forward Duane Ferrell after fouling him; Long was suspended for one game while Heat forward Keith Askins, and Hawks reserve and rookie small forward Doug Edwards, were also both suspended for their altercation off the bench; Askins was suspended for three games, and Edwards was suspended for two games. The Heat lost to the Hawks by a score of 104–86.

=== Aftermath ===
Following the season, Seikaly was traded to the Golden State Warriors after six seasons with the Heat, while Shaw signed as a free agent with the Orlando Magic, and Willie Burton signed with the Philadelphia 76ers during the next season.

== NBA draft ==
Round	Pick	Player	Position	Nationality	School/Club team
2	35	Ed Stokes	Center	United States	Arizona

== Roster ==
1993–94 Miami Heat roster
Players

Pos.	No.	Player	Height	Weight	DOB	From
F	2	Keith Askins	6 ft 7 in (2.01 m)	197 lb (89 kg)	1967–12–15	Alabama
F	34	Willie Burton	6 ft 8 in (2.03 m)	210 lb (95 kg)	1968–05–26	Minnesota
G	12	Bimbo Coles	6 ft 1 in (1.85 m)	180 lb (82 kg)	1968–04–22	Virginia Tech
C	52	Matt Geiger	7 ft 0 in (2.13 m)	243 lb (110 kg)	1969–09–10	Georgia Tech
C	33	Alec Kessler	6 ft 11 in (2.11 m)	230 lb (104 kg)	1967–01–13	Georgia
F	43	Grant Long	6 ft 8 in (2.03 m)	225 lb (102 kg)	1966–03–12	Eastern Michigan
G	32	Harold Miner	6 ft 5 in (1.96 m)	210 lb (95 kg)	1971–05–05	USC
F	41	Glen Rice	6 ft 7 in (2.01 m)	215 lb (98 kg)	1967–05–28	Michigan
C	22	John Salley	6 ft 11 in (2.11 m)	230 lb (104 kg)	1964–05–16	Georgia Tech
C	4	Rony Seikaly	6 ft 11 in (2.11 m)	230 lb (104 kg)	1965–05–10	Syracuse
G	20	Brian Shaw	6 ft 6 in (1.98 m)	190 lb (86 kg)	1966–03–22	UC Santa Barbara
G	3	Steve Smith	6 ft 7 in (2.01 m)	200 lb (91 kg)	1969–03–31	Michigan State

Coaches
Head coach
- Kevin Loughery
Assistant(s)
- Alvin Gentry
- Bob Staak

Legend
- (DP) Unsigned draft pick
- (FA) Free agent
- (S) Suspended
- Injured

Roster

== Regular season ==
=== Season standings ===
Atlantic Division	W	L	PCT	GB	Home	Road	Div
y-New York Knicks	57	25	.695	—	32–9	25–16	18–10
x-Orlando Magic	50	32	.610	7	31–10	19–22	20–8
x-New Jersey Nets	45	37	.549	12	29–12	16–25	17–11
x-Miami Heat	42	40	.512	15	22–19	20–21	16–12
Boston Celtics	32	50	.390	25	18–23	14–27	12–16
Philadelphia 76ers	25	57	.305	32	15–26	10–31	7–21
Washington Bullets	24	58	.293	33	17–24	7–34	8–20

#	Eastern Conference				
#	Team	W	L	PCT	GB
1	c-Atlanta Hawks	57	25	.695	–
2	y-New York Knicks	57	25	.695	–
3	x-Chicago Bulls	55	27	.671	2
4	x-Orlando Magic	50	32	.610	7
5	x-Indiana Pacers	47	35	.573	10
6	x-Cleveland Cavaliers	47	35	.573	10
7	x-New Jersey Nets	45	37	.549	12
8	x-Miami Heat	42	40	.512	15
9	Charlotte Hornets	41	41	.500	16
10	Boston Celtics	32	50	.390	25
11	Philadelphia 76ers	25	57	.305	32
12	Washington Bullets	24	58	.293	33
13	Milwaukee Bucks	20	62	.244	37
14	Detroit Pistons	20	62	.244	37

z – clinched division title
y – clinched division title
x – clinched playoff spot

== Game log ==
=== Regular season ===
1993–94 game log
Total: 42–40 (home: 22–19; road: 20–21)
November: 5–7 (home: 2–5; road: 3–2)

Game	Date	Team	Score	High points	High rebounds	High assists	Location Attendance	Record

December: 7–6 (home: 5–4; road: 2–2)

Game	Date	Team	Score	High points	High rebounds	High assists	Location Attendance	Record

January: 8–8 (home: 3–2; road: 5–6)

Game	Date	Team	Score	High points	High rebounds	High assists	Location Attendance	Record

February: 9–4 (home: 3–2; road: 6–2)

Game	Date	Team	Score	High points	High rebounds	High assists	Location Attendance	Record
All-Star Break

March: 8–8 (home: 5–3; road: 3–5)

Game	Date	Team	Score	High points	High rebounds	High assists	Location Attendance	Record

April: 5–7 (home: 4–3; road: 1–4)

Game	Date	Team	Score	High points	High rebounds	High assists	Location Attendance	Record

1993–94 schedule

== Playoffs ==
1994 playoff game log
First Round: 2–3 (home: 1–1; road: 1–2)

Game	Date	Team	Score	High points	High rebounds	High assists	Location Attendance	Series
1	April 28	@ Atlanta	W 93–88	Steve Smith (22)	Glen Rice (10)	Bimbo Coles (5)	The Omni; 11,543	1–0
2	April 30	@ Atlanta	L 86–104	Steve Smith (24)	Steve Smith (9)	four players tied (2)	The Omni; 16,368	1–1
3	May 3	Atlanta	W 90–86	Steve Smith (25)	Rony Seikaly (20)	Brian Shaw (4)	Miami Arena; 15,200	2–1
4	May 5	Atlanta	L 89–103	Bimbo Coles (18)	Rony Seikaly (8)	Bimbo Coles (7)	Miami Arena; 15,200	2–2
5	May 8	@ Atlanta	L 91–102	Grant Long (22)	Grant Long (10)	Rony Seikaly (4)	The Omni; 14,472	2–3

1994 schedule

== Player statistics ==
=== Ragular season ===
Player	POS	GP	GS	MP	REB	AST	STL	BLK	PTS	MPG	RPG	APG	SPG	BPG	PPG
Glen Rice	SF	81	81	2,999	434	184	110	32	1,708	37.0	5.4	2.3	1.4	.4	21.1
Steve Smith	SG	78	77	2,776	352	394	84	35	1,346	35.6	4.5	5.1	1.1	.4	17.3
Brian Shaw	SG	77	52	2,037	350	385	71	21	693	26.5	4.5	5.0	.9	.3	9.0
John Salley	PF	76	45	1,910	407	135	56	78	582	25.1	5.4	1.8	.7	1.0	7.7
Bimbo Coles	PG	76	4	1,726	159	263	75	12	588	22.7	2.1	3.5	1.0	.2	7.7
Rony Seikaly	C	72	60	2,410	740	136	59	100	1,088	33.5	10.3	1.9	.8	1.4	15.1
Matt Geiger	C	72	0	1,199	303	32	36	29	521	16.7	4.2	.4	.5	.4	7.2
Grant Long	PF	69	59	2,201	495	170	89	26	788	31.9	7.2	2.5	1.3	.4	11.4
Harold Miner	SG	63	31	1,358	156	95	31	13	661	21.6	2.5	1.5	.5	.2	10.5
Willie Burton	SF	53	1	697	136	39	18	20	371	13.2	2.6	.7	.3	.4	7.0
Keith Askins	SF	37	0	319	82	13	11	1	85	8.6	2.2	.4	.3	.0	2.3
Alec Kessler	PF	15	0	66	10	2	1	1	33	4.4	.7	.1	.1	.1	2.2
Manute Bol^{†}	C	8	0	61	11	0	0	6	2	7.6	1.4	.0	.0	.8	.3
Morlon Wiley^{†}	PG	4	0	34	4	7	2	0	7	8.5	1.0	1.8	.5	.0	1.8
Gary Alexander^{†}	PF	4	0	12	3	1	0	0	2	3.0	.8	.3	.0	.0	.5

- ^{†} Denotes player spent time with another team in the season. Stats reflect time with the Heat only.

=== Playoffs ===
Player	POS	GP	GS	MP	REB	AST	STL	BLK	PTS	MPG	RPG	APG	SPG	BPG	PPG
John Salley	PF	5	5	201	40	8	2	5	55	40.2	8.0	1.6	.4	1.0	11.0
Glen Rice	SF	5	5	195	36	10	11	2	65	39.0	7.2	2.0	2.2	.4	13.0
Steve Smith	SG	5	5	192	30	11	4	2	96	38.4	6.0	2.2	.8	.4	19.2
Brian Shaw	SG	5	5	112	20	9	4	1	39	22.4	4.0	1.8	.8	.2	7.8
Rony Seikaly	C	5	3	165	47	8	4	7	41	33.0	9.4	1.6	.8	1.4	8.2
Bimbo Coles	PG	5	0	140	14	17	7	1	69	28.0	2.8	3.4	1.4	.2	13.8
Grant Long	PF	4	2	110	18	7	3	2	49	27.5	4.5	1.8	.8	.5	12.3
Harold Miner	SG	4	0	57	8	2	1	0	32	14.3	2.0	.5	.3	.0	8.0
Willie Burton	SF	2	0	11	0	0	0	0	2	5.5	.0	.0	.0	.0	1.0
Matt Geiger	C	2	0	11	4	0	0	0	1	5.5	2.0	.0	.0	.0	.5
Keith Askins	SF	1	0	6	1	0	0	0	0	6.0	1.0	.0	.0	.0	.0
