= Keith Askins =

American basketball player and coach (born 1967)

Personal information
- Born: December 15, 1967 (age 58) Athens, Alabama, U.S.
- Listed height: 6 ft 8 in (2.03 m)
- Listed weight: 215 lb (98 kg)

Career information
- High school: Athens (Athens, Alabama)
- College: Alabama (1986–1990)
- NBA draft: 1990: undrafted
- Playing career: 1990–1999
- Position: Small forward
- Number: 2
- Coaching career: 1999–2013

Career history

Playing
- 1990–1999: Miami Heat

Coaching
- 1999–2013: Miami Heat (assistant)

Career highlights
- As assistant coach: 3× NBA champion (2006, 2012, 2013)
- Stats at NBA.com
- Stats at Basketball Reference

Keith Bernard Askins (born December 15, 1967) is an American former professional basketball player.

== Basketball career ==
After playing at the University of Alabama, the 6'7" Askins signed with the National Basketball Association's Miami Heat in 1990, after not being drafted. A versatile athlete who could guard multiple positions, he spent his entire career with the Heat as a reserve and defensive specialist, retiring after being waived in 1999 with career totals of 1,852 points and 1,428 rebounds.

Immediately after retiring, Askins joined the Heat's coaching staff, going on to serve as assistant for Pat Riley and Erik Spoelstra and winning three championships. In September 2013, he was promoted to the team's director of college and pro scouting. A career all spent with the Heat either as a player, assistant coach, or front office executive, Askins is into his 33rd season with the same franchise as of 2023.

On May 7, 2022, Askins was invited to the Alabama Sports Hall of Fame.

== Personal life ==
A graduate of the University of Alabama with a marketing degree, Askins currently resides in El Paso with his wife and twin boys.

== Career statistics ==
Legend
GP	Games played	GS	Games started	MPG	Minutes per game
FG%	Field goal percentage	3P%	3-point field goal percentage	FT%	Free throw percentage
RPG	Rebounds per game	APG	Assists per game	SPG	Steals per game
BPG	Blocks per game	PPG	Points per game	**Bold**	Career high

=== NBA ===
==== Regular season ====
Year	Team	GP	GS	MPG	FG%	3P%	FT%	RPG	APG	SPG	BPG	PPG
1990–91	Miami	39	1	6.8	.420	.240	.480	1.7	.5	.4	.3	2.2
1991–92	Miami	59	4	14.3	.410	.342	.703	2.4	.6	**.7**	.3	3.7
1992–93	Miami	69	1	13.6	.413	.338	.725	2.9	.4	.4	.4	3.3
1993–94	Miami	37	0	8.6	.409	.190	**.900**	2.2	.4	.3	.0	2.3
1994–95	Miami	50	5	17.1	.391	.269	.807	4.0	.8	**.7**	.3	4.6
1995–96	Miami	75	14	**25.3**	.402	**.418**	.789	**4.3**	**1.6**	.6	**.8**	**6.1**
1996–97	Miami	**78**	**30**	22.7	**.433**	.401	.672	3.5	1.0	**.7**	.2	4.9
1997–98	Miami	46	12	14.8	.320	.284	.632	2.2	.6	.3	.4	2.4
1998–99	Miami	33	13	12.6	.323	.276	.625	1.3	.3	.5	.1	1.6
Career		486	80	16.4	.401	.355	.717	2.9	.8	.6	.3	3.8

==== Playoffs ====
Year	Team	GP	GS	MPG	FG%	3P%	FT%	RPG	APG	SPG	BPG	PPG
1992	Miami	3	0	**16.0**	**.455**	**.600**	.000	**3.0**	**1.0**	.3	.0	**4.3**
1994	Miami	1	0	6.0	.000	–	–	1.0	.0	.0	.0	.0
1996	Miami	3	0	**16.0**	.364	.333	**1.000**	2.7	.7	.3	.0	**4.3**
1997	Miami	**12**	0	12.2	.435	.500	**1.000**	2.3	.6	.3	.2	2.5
1998	Miami	4	0	14.5	.286	.200	–	1.8	.3	**.5**	.0	1.3
1999	Miami	4	0	6.8	.000	.000	–	1.0	.0	**.5**	**.3**	.0
Career		27	0	12.3	.368	.387	.778	2.1	.5	.3	.1	2.3
