= Alan Ogg =

American basketball player (1967–2009)

Personal information
- Born: July 5, 1967 Lancaster, Ohio, U.S.
- Died: November 1, 2009 (aged 42) Birmingham, Alabama, U.S.
- Listed height: 7 ft 2 in (2.18 m)
- Listed weight: 240 lb (109 kg)

Career information
- High school: Gardendale (Gardendale, Alabama)
- College: UAB (1986–1990)
- NBA draft: 1990: undrafted
- Playing career: 1990–2001
- Position: Center
- Number: 53, 50

Career history
- 1990–1992: Miami Heat
- 1992: Rockford Lightning
- 1993: Milwaukee Bucks
- 1993: Washington Bullets
- 1993–1994: Rochester Renegade
- 1993–1994: Hartford Hellcats
- 1993–1994: Columbus Horizon
- 1994: Carol Ann - Rica Hotdogs
- 1994–1995: Mexico Aztecas
- 1996–1997: Sichuan Panda
- Stats at NBA.com
- Stats at Basketball Reference

Raymond Alan Ogg (July 5, 1967 – November 1, 2009) was an American professional basketball player who spent three seasons in the National Basketball Association (NBA). He is the UAB Blazers' career shot-blocking leader with 266 blocks over four college seasons. He was born in Lancaster, Ohio.

The 7'2" and 240-pound center Gardendale High School grad played college basketball for the UAB Blazers and started his professional career when he signed with the Miami Heat as an undrafted rookie free agent during the 1990–91 NBA season. He became a fan favorite during his two seasons in Miami and split his playing time in his third and final NBA season with the Milwaukee Bucks and the Washington Bullets. He averaged 2.2 points and 1.7 rebounds during his NBA career. Ogg played overseas in Germany, China, Colombia, the Philippines, Puerto Rico and Paraguay before retiring from professional basketball in 2001. He had heart surgery in 2003.

Ogg died aged 42 on November 1, 2009, in the UAB Hospital in Birmingham, Alabama, due to complications from a staphylococcal infection in his heart valve.

== Career statistics ==
Legend
GP	Games played	GS	Games started	MPG	Minutes per game
FG%	Field goal percentage	3P%	3-point field goal percentage	FT%	Free throw percentage
RPG	Rebounds per game	APG	Assists per game	SPG	Steals per game
BPG	Blocks per game	PPG	Points per game	**Bold**	Career high

=== NBA ===
==== Regular season ====
Year	Team	GP	GS	MPG	FG%	3P%	FT%	RPG	APG	SPG	BPG	PPG
1990–91	Miami	31	**1**	8.4	.436	.000	.600	1.6	0.1	0.2	0.9	1.7
1991–92	Miami	**43**	0	8.5	**.548**	.000	.533	1.7	0.2	0.1	0.7	2.5
1992–93	Milwaukee	3	0	**8.7**	.333	.000	**1.000**	**2.0**	**1.3**	**0.3**	**1.0**	**2.7**
1992–93	Washington	3	0	1.0	.500	.000	.500	1.3	0.0	0.0	0.0	1.7
Career		80	1	8.2	.493	.000	.568	1.7	0.2	0.2	0.7	2.2

==== Playoffs ====
Year	Team	GP	GS	MPG	FG%	3P%	FT%	RPG	APG	SPG	BPG	PPG
1991–92	Miami	3	0	5.0	.333	.000	.500	0.3	0.0	0.3	1.0	1.0

=== College ===
Year	Team	GP	GS	MPG	FG%	3P%	FT%	RPG	APG	SPG	BPG	PPG
1986–87	UAB	31	-	10.6	.456	-	.625	2.4	0.0	0.4	1.0	2.3
1987–88	UAB	27	-	8.6	.480	-	**.733**	1.8	0.0	0.0	0.6	2.2
1988–89	UAB	**34**	-	**26.3**	.573	-	.712	6.1	**0.7**	**0.5**	**3.8**	9.8
1989–90	UAB	31	-	23.0	**.591**	-	.672	**6.2**	**0.7**	0.3	2.9	**10.5**
Career		123	-	17.6	.559	-	.689	4.2	0.4	0.3	2.2	6.4
