= Rony Seikaly =

Lebanese-American basketball player (born 1965)

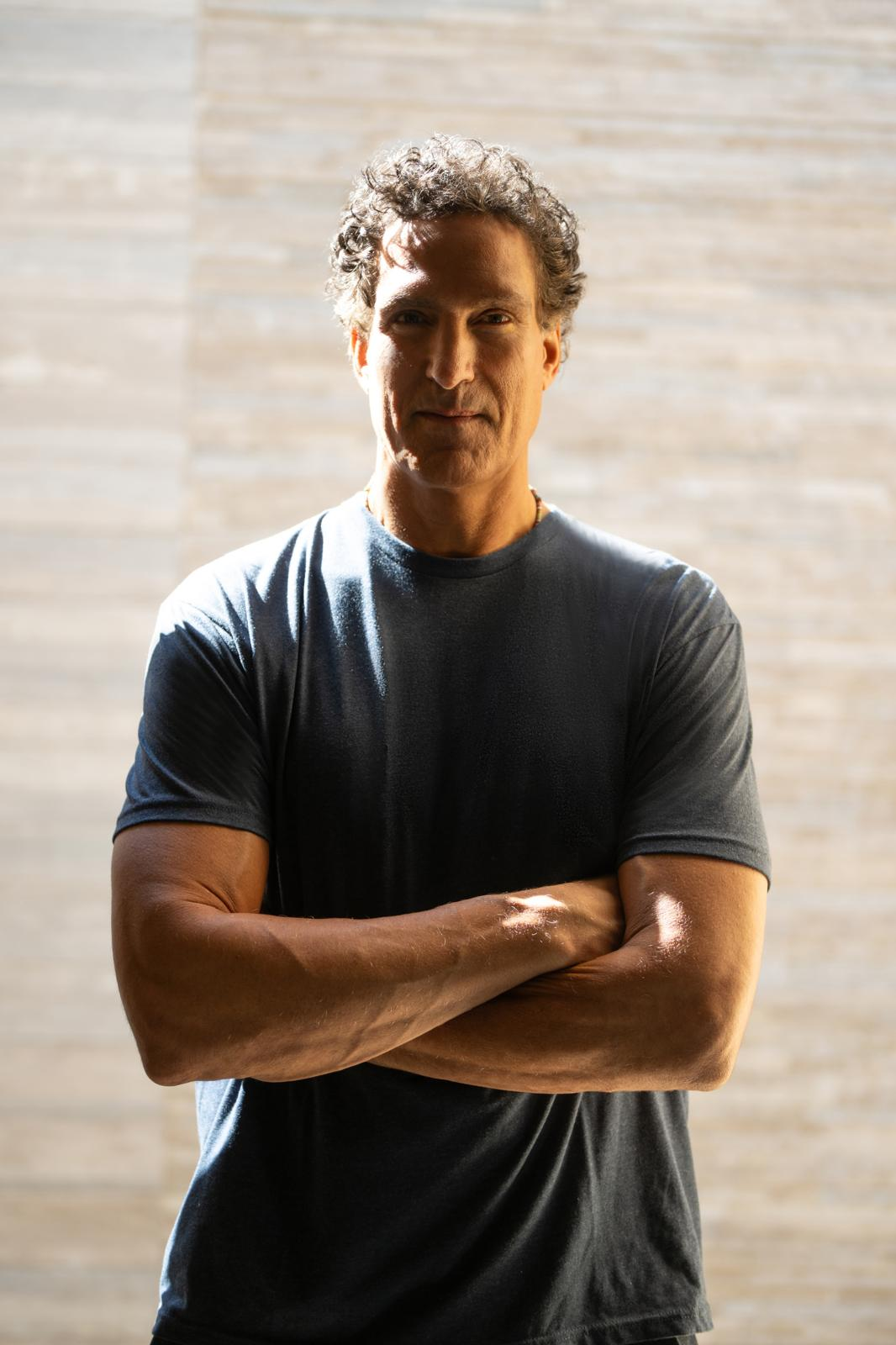

Personal information
- Born: May 10, 1965 (age 61) Beirut, Lebanon
- Listed height: 6 ft 10 in (2.08 m)
- Listed weight: 230 lb (104 kg)

Career information
- High school: American Schools (Athens, Greece)
- College: Syracuse (1984–1988)
- NBA draft: 1988: 1st round, 9th overall pick
- Drafted by: Miami Heat
- Playing career: 1988–2000
- Position: Center
- Number: 4, 9, 2

Career history
- 1988–1994: Miami Heat
- 1994–1996: Golden State Warriors
- 1996–1998: Orlando Magic
- 1998–1999: New Jersey Nets
- 2000: Barcelona

Career highlights
- NBA Most Improved Player (1990); Consensus second-team All-American (1988); 3× Second-team All-Big East (1986–1988); No. 4 retired by Syracuse Orange

Career NBA statistics
- Points: 9,991 (14.7 ppg)
- Rebounds: 6,424 (9.5 rpg)
- Assists: 860 (1.3 apg)
- Stats at NBA.com
- Stats at Basketball Reference
Medals
Men's basketball
Representing the United States
FIBA World Cup
Gold medal – first place	1986 Spain	Team competition
Goodwill Games
Gold medal – first place	1986 Soviet Union	Team competition
Representing Lebanon
West Asian Championship
Silver medal – second place	1999 Beirut	Team competition

Ronald Fred Seikaly (born May 10, 1965) is a former professional NBA basketball player, real estate developer, and internationally acclaimed DJ and music producer. The first-ever draft pick in Miami Heat history, Seikaly became one of the best centers in the NBA—and one of the earliest internationally born players to make an impact on American basketball. He earned NBA Most Improved Player, was named NBA Player of the Week twice, captured gold medals, and set multiple franchise and collegiate records while competing against legends such as Michael Jordan, Magic Johnson, Kobe Bryant, Larry Bird, and Shaquille O’Neal. Before his professional career, he led Syracuse University to the NCAA Championship Final, making one of the most successful eras in the school’s basketball history. Seikaly is a real estate developer and has managed his own investment fund. His personal residence has been featured in Architectural Digest. In music, Seikaly has established a career as a house music producer and DJ, releasing over 50 tracks that have entered the Top 100 charts. He has performed at international venues including Circoloco in Ibiza and Space Miami, and has appeared alongside artists such as Marco Carola, Luciano, Black Coffee, Erick Morillo, John Summit, and Keinemusik.

== Early life ==
Seikaly was born in Beirut, Lebanon. In 1979, at the age of 14, he moved to Athens, Greece, where he spent the rest of his youth.

While in Greece, he attended and graduated from the American School, also known as ACS Athens. As a youth, he played basketball, and also excelled in volleyball, association football, and track & field. At age 14, he also began to DJ.

In 1981, when Seikaly was 16, the Panathinaikos basketball player Takis Koroneos took note of him, after he purchased a pair of basketball sneakers in Koroneos' athletics store. On the recommendation of Koroneos, Seikaly was selected to join Panathinaikos' men's senior team, in order to begin training and practicing with them. In 1982, at age 17, he first played with the team in a tournament in Cyprus. Panathinaikos is one of the most storied franchises in Greek basketball history.

He continued to train and practice with Panathinaikos until 1983. However, because he did not have a Greek passport, he was not able to register with the team to play in any games in the Greek Basket League, since no foreign players were allowed to play in the league until 1988.

== College career ==
In 1983, Seikaly moved from Greece to the United States and began attending Syracuse University in central New York, where he played college basketball. He played center for the Syracuse Orange men's basketball team. He led his Syracuse team to the 1987 NCAA tournament championship finals against the Indiana Hoosiers during his junior year, after averaging 22 points and 11 rebounds per game throughout the tournament. He was an All-American, and was also named to the John R. Wooden All-American Team. He graduated from Syracuse as the school's all-time leading rebounder, second in school history in blocked shots, and fourth in school history in scoring. At the time, he was only the second player ever to record 1,000 points and rebounds during his tenure at Syracuse. He was named to the Orange's All 20th Century Team, and his number 4 jersey has been retired and raised to the rafters at the Carrier Dome.

== Professional career ==
=== Miami Heat (1988–1994) ===
Seikaly was taken by the Miami Heat with the 9th pick in the first round of the 1988 NBA draft. As well as being the franchise's first ever college draft pick, Seikaly became the first player born in Lebanon to compete in the National Basketball Association (NBA).

The rookie center quickly emerged not only as a pivotal player within the team, but also among the league's top centers. In his second season, he led the Heat in points (16.6), rebounds (10.4) and blocks (1.7) while placing sixth in the league in rebounding. At the conclusion of the season he was awarded with the NBA Most Improved Player Award.

In the 1990–91 season, Seikaly increased his rebounding average to 11.1 rebounds per game while maintaining his 16 points per game average and then they acquired other young players to serve as scoring options such as Glen Rice and Steve Smith. In the 1991–92 season, Seikaly again averaged 16 points and 11 rebounds (6th in the league) as the Heat, bolstered by his play and Rice's scoring, led the team to 38 wins and the first playoff berth for the franchise. Despite the breakthrough, Miami was no match for the defending champions, the Michael Jordan-led Chicago Bulls, who swept the Heat in three games. For the series against the Bulls, Seikaly averaged 19.1 points with 9.2 rebounds.

Seikaly increased his scoring to 17.3 and once again averaged 11.8 rebounds a game (8th in the league) during the 1992–93 season. He managed to win the NBA player of the week after averaging 30 points and 20 Rebounds for the week of March 7. The following season featured increased scoring by Rice and Smith, and Seikaly averaged 15.1 points a game for third on the team while leading the team in rebounds with 10.3 rebounds per game. The Heat won 42 games, good enough to make the playoffs. Facing off against the Atlanta Hawks in the first round.

Seikaly's career with Miami saw him setting numerous single-game team records, including blocks (8), rebounds (34) and double–doubles. During his run with the Heat, he had the nickname "The Spin Doctor", due to his trademark low-post spin moves.

His career highs with the Heat are 40 points, 34 rebounds, 8 blocks, 8 assists, and 5 steals.

=== Golden State Warriors (1994–1996) ===
On November 2, 1994, Seikaly was traded to the Golden State Warriors for Billy Owens and the rights to Sasha Danilović. Seikaly only played in 36 games during the 1994–95 season, but started in all but one of those appearances averaging 12 points and 7 rebounds per game for the Warriors who were decimated by injuries. He would go on to start in 60 of 64 games in the 1995–96 season, averaging 12 points and 7.8 rebounds, but the Warriors once again were plagued by injuries and could not reach the playoffs. In November 1996, he was once again traded, this time to the Orlando Magic.

=== Orlando Magic (1996–1998) ===
In November 1996, Seikaly, Clifford Rozier and a 1999 second-round draft pick were traded to the Orlando Magic for Donald Royal, Felton Spencer, and Jon Koncak. The Magic had been a dominant Eastern Conference team, but lost superstar center Shaquille O'Neal, and Seikaly was brought in to fill the void. Despite playing alongside other veteran scorers such as Horace Grant, Nick Anderson and Dennis Scott, Seikaly boosted his scoring to 17.3 points per game for second on the team behind All-Star Penny Hardaway, and led the team in rebounds per game (9.5) and blocks (1.4). The Magic won 45 games and entered the playoffs as the 7th seed in the conference, facing off against Seikaly's old team in Miami, who then featured an All-Star center Alonzo Mourning. Despite taking a 2–0 lead in Miami, the Heat responded with two wins at home to tie the series at 2 games apiece, but injuries forced Seikaly out of the 4th and deciding 5th games in which the Heat won to advance.

Seikaly would start in 47 games to start the 1997–98 season, but in February the Magic agreed to trade Seikaly to the Utah Jazz for Chris Morris, Greg Foster and a first-round draft pick. The Magic soon rescinded the trade due to Seikaly's refusal to report and instead sent Seikaly to the New Jersey Nets alongside Brian Evans in exchange for Yinka Dare, David Benoit, Kevin Edwards and a first-round draft pick. He averaged 16 points and 9.5 rebounds per game in his stint in Orlando.

=== New Jersey Nets (1998–1999) ===
Following his arrival in New Jersey, Seikaly had a career ending foot injury and only played in 9 games to finish the 1997–98 season, and would only play in 9 games of the lockout-shortened 1998–99 season before retiring from the league. He finished his NBA career with averages of 14.7 points per game, 9.5 rebounds per game, and 1.3 blocks per game.

=== FC Barcelona (2000) ===
In 2000, Seikaly moved to the Spanish ACB League club Barcelona. In three games played in Spain's 2000–01 ACB season, he averaged 15.3 points, 8.0 rebounds, 1.7 steals and 0.7 blocks per game in 28.3 minutes played per game. With Barcelona, he also played in the top-level European-wide club competition, the EuroLeague. In the EuroLeague's 2000–01 season, he played in a total of four games. He averaged 13.0 points, 5.3 rebounds, 1.0 assists, 1.3 steals and 1.0 blocks per game in 24.5 minutes played per game.

== Career statistics ==
=== NBA career statistics ===
Legend
GP	Games played	GS	Games started	MPG	Minutes per game
FG%	Field goal percentage	3P%	3-point field goal percentage	FT%	Free throw percentage
RPG	Rebounds per game	APG	Assists per game	SPG	Steals per game
BPG	Blocks per game	PPG	Points per game	**Bold**	Career high
†	Won an NBA championship	*	Led the league

=== Regular season ===
Year	Team	GP	GS	MPG	FG%	3P%	FT%	RPG	APG	SPG	BPG	PPG
1988–89	Miami	78	62	25.2	.448	.250	.511	7.0	.7	.6	1.2	10.9
1989–90	Miami	74	72	32.6	.502	.000	.594	10.4	1.1	**1.1**	**1.7**	16.6
1990–91	Miami	64	59	33.9	.481	.333	.619	11.1	1.5	.8	1.3	16.4
1991–92	Miami	**79**	**78**	**35.4**	.489	.000	.733	**11.8**	1.4	.5	1.5	16.4
1992–93	Miami	72	64	34.1	.480	.125	.735	**11.8**	1.4	.5	1.2	17.1
1993–94	Miami	72	60	33.5	.488	.000	.720	10.3	**1.9**	.8	1.4	15.1
1994–95	Golden State	36	35	28.8	**.516**	.000	.694	7.4	1.3	.6	1.0	12.1
1995–96	Golden State	64	60	28.3	.502	**.667**	.723	7.8	1.1	.6	1.1	12.1
1996–97	Orlando	74	68	35.3	.507	.000	.714	9.5	1.2	.7	1.4	**17.3**
1997–98	Orlando	47	47	31.6	.441	.000	**.754**	7.6	1.5	.5	.8	15.0
1997–98	New Jersey	9	2	16.9	.317	.000	.593	4.0	.9	.3	.4	4.7
1998–99	New Jersey	9	0	9.8	.200	.000	.389	2.3	.2	.4	.7	1.7
**Career**		678	607	31.6	.484	.188	.679	9.5	1.3	.7	1.3	14.7

== National team career ==
=== Greece ===
Seikaly first began training and practicing with the senior Greece national team, in 1983, at the age of 18. However, because he was unable to acquire a Greek passport, he was unable to represent Greece's national team in any official games. Despite that obstacle, he continued to train and practice with Greece's national team until 1986. Despite not being able to play with Greece, Seikaly felt connected to the national team, since he had trained and practiced with it for 3 years. Because of that, he sat next to the Greek team's bench at the final of the 1987 Athens EuroBasket, that Greece beat the Soviet Union, to win the tournament's gold medal.

=== United States ===
Seikaly became a naturalized citizen of the United States. He was then able to represent Team USA at both the 1986 Goodwill Games and the 1986 FIBA World Championship. As a member of Team USA, he won gold medals at both tournaments.

=== Lebanon ===
Seikaly later asked FIBA to grant him permission to represent the Lebanese national team. FIBA granted the request, and Seikaly was thus able to represent Lebanon. With Lebanon, he played at the 1999 West Asian Championship, which was held in Beirut. Seikaly helped the Lebanese win the tournament's silver medal. He averaged 30 points and 20 rebounds in those games.

== Musical career ==
Rony Seikaly
- Born: Ronald Seikaly; Beirut, Lebanon
- Origin: Beirut, Lebanon
- Genres: House, deep house, tech house, techno
- Occupations: DJ, music producer
- Years active: 2005–present
- Labels: Saved, Moon Harbor, Armada, Stride, Radiant, Subliminal, Nervous Records, Stereo, Suara, Yoshitoshi
- Website: ronyseikaly.com

Seikaly started DJing at the age of 14 whilst living in Greece. After retiring from basketball, he developed a musical career as a professional DJ and music producer. Seikaly has been producing and working in the genres of house, deep house, tech house and techno, and has played in many of the major clubs across the globe including Miami’s Club Space, Montreal’s Stereo, and many others. He is a resident with the globally party series Circoloco at DC10 Ibiza. He has released many solo EPs, singles, and albums, including “Moonwalk” in 2022. He has had more than 50 records in the Beatport Top 100 charts.

He started his own record label called “Stride” in 2019 and also ran his own radio show on Sirius XM satellite radio called SugarFreeRadio which aired four days per week and was a resounding success since 2012.

== Discography ==
=== Studio albums ===
- ''Moonwalk'' (2022)

=== Compilation albums & mixes ===
- ''Stride All Stars, Vol. 1'' (compilation contribution / label release).

=== Selected EPs and singles ===
- "Seen It Coming" (with Nick Curly) — single / extended mixes
- "Get Up and Dance" (with Gorje Hewek) — single
- "Temperatura" (with Infinem) — single
- "Lose Your Love" — single (listed on major stores)
- "Walking Out of The Dark" — single (listed on major stores)

== Real estate career ==
Beginning in 1991, Rony Seikaly invested in waterfront property on Star Island and went on to develop numerous luxury waterfront homes in Miami Beach, including a residence later sold to Shaquille O'Neal.

He later founded Quadrant Investment Group, through which he has co-invested in large-scale residential projects, and owned and managed multiple U.S. real estate investment funds.

== Personal life ==
Seikaly speaks four languages fluently: English, Greek, Arabic and French. During his NBA playing career, he returned to Greece during the off-season, to visit his friends and family members.

When Magic Johnson returned to the NBA HIV-positive, and there was opposition to his inclusion in the league, because of his health status, Seikaly challenged him to a game of one-on-one, to show everyone that HIV is not contagious by touch.

He was married to fashion model Elsa Benitez from 1999 to 2005.

He has two daughters, Mila and Aya.

=== Charity ===
Seikaly has supported charitable organizations and initiatives, including the Miami Heat Corporate Education program and its “Shoot for the Stars” initiative, the Make-A-Wish Foundation, the Sylvester Comprehensive Cancer Center, Nicklaus Children’s Hospital (formerly Miami Children’s Hospital), and many more.

== See also ==
- List of NBA single-game rebounding leaders
