= Grant Long =

American basketball player (born 1966)

Personal information
- Born: March 12, 1966 (age 60) Wayne, Michigan, U.S.
- Listed height: 6 ft 9 in (2.06 m)
- Listed weight: 240 lb (109 kg)

Career information
- High school: Romulus (Romulus, Michigan)
- College: Eastern Michigan (1984–1988)
- NBA draft: 1988: 2nd round, 33rd overall pick
- Drafted by: Miami Heat
- Playing career: 1988–2003
- Position: Power forward / small forward
- Number: 43

Career history
- 1988–1994: Miami Heat
- 1994–1996: Atlanta Hawks
- 1996–1998: Detroit Pistons
- 1999: Atlanta Hawks
- 1999–2002: Vancouver / Memphis Grizzlies
- 2003: Boston Celtics

Career highlights
- MAC Player of the Year (1988); 2× First-team All-MAC (1987, 1988); No. 43 retired by Eastern Michigan Eagles

Career NBA statistics
- Points: 9,518 (9.5 ppg)
- Rebounds: 6,154 (6.1 rpg)
- Assists: 1,716 (1.7 apg)
- Stats at NBA.com
- Stats at Basketball Reference

Grant Andrew Long (born March 12, 1966) is an American former professional basketball player. He played over 1,000 games in the National Basketball Association over a 15-year career. Long had two relatives who were playing in the NBA during his tenure in the league: his uncle John Long, and his cousin Terry Mills. His brother is professional boxer Julius Long.

== NBA career statistics ==
Legend
GP	Games played	GS	Games started	MPG	Minutes per game
FG%	Field goal percentage	3P%	3-point field goal percentage	FT%	Free throw percentage
RPG	Rebounds per game	APG	Assists per game	SPG	Steals per game
BPG	Blocks per game	PPG	Points per game	**Bold**	Career high
*	Led the league

=== Regular season ===
Year	Team	GP	GS	MPG	FG%	3P%	FT%	RPG	APG	SPG	BPG	PPG
1988–89	Miami	**82**	73	29.7	.486	.000	.749	6.7	1.8	1.5	**.6**	11.9
1989–90	Miami	81	31	22.9	.483	.000	.714	5.0	1.2	1.1	.5	8.5
1990–91	Miami	80	66	31.4	.492	.167	.787	7.1	2.2	1.5	.5	9.2
1991–92	Miami	**82**	**82**	**37.4**	**.494**	.273	**.807**	8.4	**2.7**	**1.7**	.5	**14.8**
1992–93	Miami	76	62	35.9	.469	.231	.765	7.5	2.4	1.4	.4	14.0
1993–94	Miami	69	59	31.9	.446	.167	.786	7.2	2.5	1.3	.4	11.4
1994–95	Miami	2	2	31.0	.417	–	.600	5.5	2.0	1.0	.0	8.0
1994–95	Atlanta	79	77	32.6	.479	.355	.756	7.5	1.6	1.4	.4	11.7
1995–96	Atlanta	**82**	**82***	36.7	.471	.360	.763	**9.6**	2.2	1.3	.4	13.1
1996–97	Detroit	65	24	18.0	.447	**.362**	.750	3.4	.6	.7	.1	5.0
1997–98	Detroit	40	17	18.5	.427	.000	.719	3.8	.6	.7	.3	3.5
1998–99	Atlanta	50*	13	27.6	.421	.167	.783	5.9	1.1	1.1	.3	9.8
1999–00	Vancouver	42	1	21.9	.443	.000	.775	5.6	1.0	1.1	.2	4.8
2000–01	Vancouver	66	27	22.8	.439	.267	.713	4.2	1.3	1.1	.2	6.0
2001–02	Memphis	66	56	28.3	.426	.176	.699	3.5	2.1	1.0	.2	6.3
2002–03	Boston	41	1	11.9	.386	.000	.783	2.0	.6	.2	.0	1.8
Career		1,003	673	28.4	.467	.283	.761	6.1	1.7	1.2	.4	9.5

=== Playoffs ===
Year	Team	GP	GS	MPG	FG%	3P%	FT%	RPG	APG	SPG	BPG	PPG
1992	Miami	3	3	**40.0**	.417	.000	.700	5.0	2.7	1.7	.0	12.3
1994	Miami	4	2	27.5	.389	–	.778	4.5	1.8	.8	**.5**	12.3
1995	Atlanta	3	3	36.7	**.500**	.000	.722	**11.3**	1.3	1.3	.3	**13.7**
1996	Atlanta	**10**	**10**	36.2	.396	**.250**	.800	8.6	**2.8**	.7	.3	11.4
1997	Detroit	5	0	17.2	.444	.000	**.818**	2.2	.6	.8	.0	5.0
1999	Atlanta	9	9	39.8	.409	**.250**	.727	8.2	.9	**2.0**	.4	11.7
2003	Boston	8	0	4.3	.250	–	–	.6	.1	.0	.0	.3
Career		42	27	28.1	.411	.200	.756	5.8	1.4	1.0	.2	8.9

== Broadcasting career ==
Having served as the broadcast analyst for the Oklahoma City Thunder since 2008, Long resigned from the position in July 2014. In October 2014 Long joined Fox Sports Detroit as a Detroit Pistons analyst and sideline reporter, made the transition to Bally Sports Detroit, and now FanDuel Sports Network Detroit.
