= Alec Kessler =

American basketball player (1967–2007)

Personal information
- Born: January 13, 1967 Minneapolis, Minnesota, U.S.
- Died: October 13, 2007 (aged 40) Gulf Breeze, Florida, U.S.
- Listed height: 6 ft 11 in (2.11 m)
- Listed weight: 230 lb (104 kg)

Career information
- High school: Roswell (Roswell, Georgia)
- College: Georgia (1986–1990)
- NBA draft: 1990: 1st round, 12th overall pick
- Drafted by: Houston Rockets
- Playing career: 1990–1994
- Position: Power forward / center
- Number: 33

Career history
- 1990–1994: Miami Heat
- 1994: Olimpia Stefanel Milano

Career highlights
- Second-team All-American – UPI (1990); SEC Athlete of the Year (1990)

Career NBA statistics
- Points: 1,084 (5.2 ppg)
- Rebounds: 751 (3.6 rpg)
- Stats at NBA.com
- Stats at Basketball Reference

Alec Christopher Kessler (January 13, 1967 – October 13, 2007) was an American college basketball player for the University of Georgia and later, as a professional, for the Miami Heat in the National Basketball Association (NBA) and in the Italian league for Olimpia Stefanel Milano. After his basketball career ended, he became an orthopedic surgeon.

== Career ==
Kessler played collegiately for the University of Georgia Bulldogs, where he was a three-time academic all-American first-team selection as well as the national academic all-American of the year in 1989 and 1990. Kessler left Georgia as the school's all-time leading scorer with 1,788 points (until the record was surpassed by Litterial Green).

The 6'11" power forward/center was selected 12th in the 1990 NBA draft by the Houston Rockets, but his draft rights were immediately traded to the Miami Heat in exchange for the draft rights to Dave Jamerson and Carl Herrera.

Kessler made some news during the 1991 NBA Playoffs when he went missing for days in the Bahamas while checking on honeymoon spots with his fiancé. He had failed to check in with family members and it prompted a two-day search until he was found safe.

In his NBA career, he was a member of the Miami Heat for 210 games spanning four seasons until being waived on November 2, 1994, prior to the start of the 1994–95 season. He was played mostly as a backup center and held career averages of 5.2 points and 3.6 rebounds per game. He was still receiving $300,000 per annum from the Heat ten years after being cut. He would be the last Miami Heat player to wear #33 before the arrival of Alonzo Mourning, whom it was later retired in honor of.

== After the NBA ==
After leaving the NBA, Kessler attended medical school at Emory University, graduating in 1999. He was an orthopedic surgeon in practice in Pensacola, Florida.

Kessler died after suffering a heart attack during a pick-up basketball game in Gulf Breeze, Florida on October 13, 2007. He was survived by his wife, Rhea, and two sons, Nickolas and Christopher.

== Career statistics ==
Legend
GP	Games played	GS	Games started	MPG	Minutes per game
FG%	Field goal percentage	3P%	3-point field goal percentage	FT%	Free throw percentage
RPG	Rebounds per game	APG	Assists per game	SPG	Steals per game
BPG	Blocks per game	PPG	Points per game	**Bold**	Career high

=== NBA ===
==== Regular season ====
Year	Team	GP	GS	MPG	FG%	3P%	FT%	RPG	APG	SPG	BPG	PPG
1990–91	Miami	**78**	**18**	**16.1**	.425	.000	.672	**4.3**	**.4**	**.2**	.3	**6.2**
1991–92	Miami	77	4	15.5	.413	–	**.817**	4.1	**.4**	**.2**	**.4**	5.3
1992–93	Miami	40	2	10.4	**.467**	.455	.766	2.3	**.4**	.1	.3	3.9
1993–94	Miami	15	0	4.4	.440	**.556**	.750	.7	.1	.1	.1	2.2
Career		210	24	14.0	.426	.417	.744	3.6	.4	.2	.3	5.2

==== Playoffs ====
Year	Team	GP	GS	MPG	FG%	3P%	FT%	RPG	APG	SPG	BPG	PPG
1992	Miami	2	0	6.0	.000	–	1.000	.5	.0	.0	.0	1.0
Career		2	0	6.0	.000	–	1.000	.5	.0	.0	.0	1.0

== Family ==
Kessler's brother, Chad, also played for the Georgia Bulldogs basketball team. Chad was drafted by the Los Angeles Clippers in the 5th round of the 1987 NBA draft, but was cut in the pre-season. Chad's son, Houston Kessler, signed a letter of intent to play for the Bulldogs in the 2012–13 season. Chad's other son Walker plays for the Los Angeles Lakers as a center.
