= Travis Mays =

American basketball player-coach (born 1968)

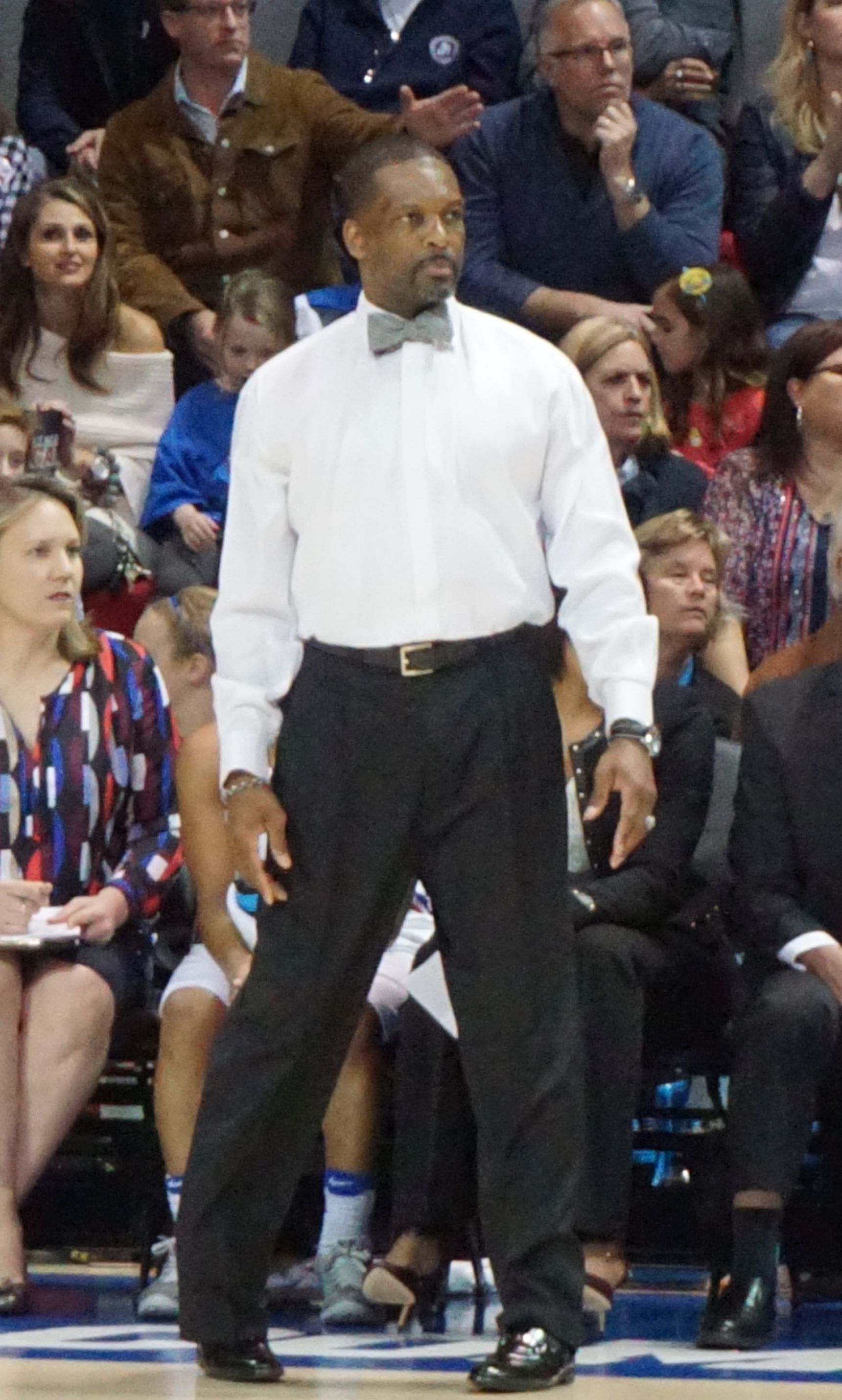

Personal information
- Born: June 19, 1968 (age 58) Ocala, Florida, U.S.
- Listed height: 6 ft 2 in (1.88 m)
- Listed weight: 190 lb (86 kg)

Career information
- High school: Vanguard (Ocala, Florida)
- College: Texas (1986–1990)
- NBA draft: 1990: 1st round, 14th overall pick
- Drafted by: Sacramento Kings
- Playing career: 1990–2002
- Position: Shooting guard
- Number: 1
- Coaching career: 2002–present

Career history

Playing
- 1990–1991: Sacramento Kings
- 1991–1993: Atlanta Hawks
- 1993: Rochester Renegade
- 1994–1995: Panionios
- 1995–1996: Ironi Ramat Gan
- 1996–1997: Tuborg Pilsener
- 1998–1999: Mabo Pistoia
- 1999–2002: Mens Sana 1871 Basket

Coaching
- 2002–2003: San Antonio Silver Stars (assistant)
- 2004–2007: Texas (assistant)
- 2007–2011: LSU (assistant)
- 2011–2012: Georgia (assistant)
- 2012–2016: Texas (associate HC)
- 2016–2021: SMU

Career highlights
- As player: NBA All-Rookie Second Team (1991); Greek League All-Star (1994 II); Greek All-Star Game 3-Point Shootout Champion (1994 II); 2× SWC Player of the Year (1989, 1990); 3× First-team All-SWC (1988–1990)

Career NBA statistics
- Points: 1,273 (11.1 ppg)
- Rebounds: 233 (2.0 rpg)
- Assists: 326 (2.8 apg)
- Stats at NBA.com
- Stats at Basketball Reference
Medals
Men's basketball
Representing United States
Summer Universiade
Gold medal – first place	1989 Duisburg	National team

Travis Cortez Mays (born June 19, 1968) is an American women's basketball coach and former professional player who was the women's head coach for Southern Methodist University (SMU) from 2016 until 2021. Mays was selected by the Sacramento Kings in the first round (14th overall pick) of the 1990 NBA draft. Born in Ocala, Florida, he played basketball for Vanguard High School before enrolling at the University of Texas to compete for the Longhorns. After his time in the NBA, Mays played professional basketball in several leagues in Europe.

== Amateur career ==
Mays went to Vanguard High School where he was a scholastic All-America standout, and he then proceeded to play basketball for the University of Texas. Mays and teammates Lance Blanks and Joey Wright were known as the "BMW – The Ultimate Scoring Machine" during the 1989–90 basketball season. That Longhorn team advanced to the Elite Eight in the 1990 NCAA Men's Division I Basketball Tournament.

Mays ranks second in UT men's basketball all-time scoring (2,279 points) and also is second in Southwest Conference all-time scoring. He was the first player to earn back-to-back SWC Player of the Year honors. Mays' career scoring average was 18.4 points per game. He scored in double-figures in 100 of 124 career games and was the only UT men's player in history to score more than 700 points in a season at the end of his Longhorn career, having scored 743 points as a junior and 772 as a senior. His single-season scoring record has subsequently been broken by Kevin Durant. In the 1989–90 season that ended in the Elite Eight, Mays had a scoring average of 24.1 points per game as a senior. In 2002, he was inducted into the UT Men's Athletics Hall of Honor.

== Professional career ==
Mays was selected by the Sacramento Kings with the 14th pick of the 1990 NBA draft. During his rookie campaign for the Kings, he was named to the NBA All-Rookie Second Team, averaging 14.3 points per game in 64 games. He spent the next two seasons with the Atlanta Hawks, where two games into his second season, he ruptured both tendons in his right ankle and was out for the remainder of the season. He returned for his final NBA season the next year. Mays had an NBA career scoring average of 11.1 points per game.

Mays' professional career extended to European and international basketball, as he played in Greece, Israel, Turkey, and Italy. In 1994 Mays signed with Greek club Panionios BC, where he would spend the entire season. In the Greek League, Mays averaged 23.8 points, 2.4 rebounds and 2.6 assists per game. Highlights of his European career include his selection to the European All-Star Game, leading Panionios to the European Championship final eight with 27.5 points per game, and a First Team All-Star selection (1999–2001) on Italy's Siena squad. He retired as a player in 2002.

== NBA career statistics ==
Year	Team	GP	GS	MPG	FG%	3P%	FT%	RPG	APG	SPG	BPG	PPG
1990–91	Sacramento	64	55	33.5	.406	.365	.770	2.8	4.0	1.3	.2	14.3
1991–92	Atlanta	2	0	16.0	.429	.500	1.000	1.0	.5	.0	.0	8.5
1992–93	Atlanta	49	9	16.1	.417	.345	.659	1.1	1.5	.4	.1	7.0
Career		115	64	25.8	.410	.362	.749	2.0	2.8	.9	.1	11.1

== Coaching career ==
Mays spent the 2002–04 seasons coaching and scouting as an assistant coach for the WNBA's San Antonio Silver Stars franchise. He also coached AAU boys' basketball for the Tennessee/Alabama "Pump" team in the summer of 2003. From 2004 to 2007, he returned to his alma mater and served as an assistant coach under Jody Conradt for the Texas Longhorns women's basketball team. Mays' primary duties were working with UT's guard play and recruiting. He was instrumental in signing, among others, Erika Arriaran, Crystal Boyd, Earnesia Williams, and Brittainey Raven.

After Conradt retired, Mays worked in the same capacity with the Louisiana State University women's team from 2007 to 2011. He then spent one year as an assistant coach for the University of Georgia women's basketball team. From 2012 to 2016, he returned again to UT as the associate head coach under new head coach Karen Aston. In 2016, he became the head coach at SMU. He was let go on March 8, 2021, after 5 seasons at SMU.

== Head coaching record ==
Record table
Season	Team	Overall	Conference	Standing	Postseason
SMU Mustangs (American Athletic Conference) (2016–2021)
2016–17	SMU	19–15	7–9	T5th	WNIT Third Round
2017–18	SMU	10–20	4–12	10th	
2018–19	SMU	11–19	5–11	T-8th	
2019–20	SMU	13–16	7–9	T-6th	
2020–21	SMU	0–6 (Note: SMU cancelled their season on December 29, 2020 due to concerns over the COVID-19 Pandemic.)	0–2	11th	
SMU:		53–76 (.411)	23–43 (.348)		
Total:		53–76 (.411)			
National champion Postseason invitational champion Conference regular season champion Conference regular season and conference tournament champion Division regular season champion Division regular season and conference tournament champion Conference tournament champion

== Career achievements ==
=== As a player ===
- Southwest Conference Player of the Year (1989, 1990)
- Three-year All-Southwest Conference (1987–1990)
- UT Men's Athletics Hall of Honor (2002)
- European All-Star (1994, 1995)
- First Team All-Star (Italy) 1999–2001

== Personal ==
Mays earned a Bachelor of Arts degree in psychology from UT in 1990, where he was also a member of the Texas Wranglers organization. He received Italian citizenship through his wife Mirella, herself of Italian ancestry.
