= Willie Burton =

American basketball player (born 1968)

Personal information
- Born: May 26, 1968 (age 58) Detroit, Michigan, U.S.
- Listed height: 6 ft 8 in (2.03 m)
- Listed weight: 210 lb (95 kg)

Career information
- High school: Saint Martin de Porres (Detroit, Michigan)
- College: Minnesota (1986–1990)
- NBA draft: 1990: 1st round, 9th overall pick
- Drafted by: Miami Heat
- Playing career: 1990–2004
- Position: Small forward
- Number: 34, 9

Career history
- 1990–1994: Miami Heat
- 1994–1995: Philadelphia 76ers
- 1995: Aresium Milan
- 1995–1996: Florida Beach Dogs
- 1996–1997: Atlanta Hawks
- 1997–1998: Quad City Thunder
- 1998: San Antonio Spurs
- 1999: Charlotte Hornets
- 1999–2000: Iraklio
- 2000: Oklahoma Storm
- 2000–2001: Idaho Stampede
- 2001–2002: PBC Ural Great Perm
- 2003: Great Lakes Storm
- 2003–2004: Sagesse

Career highlights
- NBA All-Rookie Second Team (1991); First-team All-Big Ten (1990); Second-team All-Big Ten (1989); No. 34 retired by Minnesota Golden Gophers

Career NBA statistics
- Points: 3,243 (10.3 ppg)
- Rebounds: 932 (2.9 rpg)
- Assists: 393 (1.2 apg)
- Stats at NBA.com
- Stats at Basketball Reference

Willie Ricardo Burton (born May 26, 1968) is an American former professional basketball player who was selected by the Miami Heat in the first round (ninth overall pick) in the 1990 NBA draft from the Minnesota Golden Gophers. Burton played for numerous NBA teams from 1990 to 1999. He also played in Europe for several seasons.

He was born in Detroit where he attended high school at Saint Martin De Porres. Willie has three children with Carla Burton.

== High school career ==
Burton attended high school at Saint Martin De Porres. The school won the Michigan Class C state championship in 1985 and 1986. Burton was inducted into the Detroit Catholic High School Hall of Fame in 1990.

== College career ==
The University of Minnesota reached the Sweet Sixteen during Burton's junior year (1989) and the Elite Eight during his senior season (1990). Burton finished his college career as the Golden Gophers' second all-time leading scorer, with 1,800 points. He was a first-team All-Big Ten selection in 1990, a second-team All-Big Ten selection in 1989 and honorable mention All-Big Ten in 1988. After sharing team MVP honors in 1988, he was the team's sole MVP in 1989 and 1990. Burton was entered in the University of Minnesota Hall of Fame in 2013, and his #34 jersey was retired January 26, 2020.

== Professional career ==
Burton was selected by the Miami Heat in the 1st round (9th overall pick) in the 1990 NBA draft from the University of Minnesota. He earned Second-Team All-Rookie Team status, averaging 12 ppg in his rookie campaign.

Burton scored 53 points in a game for the Philadelphia 76ers against his former Heat team on December 13, 1994. Burton only attempted 19 field goals in the game, which is the second fewest field goal attempts in a 50-point game.

== NBA career statistics ==
Legend
GP	Games played	GS	Games started	MPG	Minutes per game
FG%	Field goal percentage	3P%	3-point field goal percentage	FT%	Free throw percentage
RPG	Rebounds per game	APG	Assists per game	SPG	Steals per game
BPG	Blocks per game	PPG	Points per game	**Bold**	Career high

=== Regular season ===
Year	Team	GP	GS	MPG	FG%	3P%	FT%	RPG	APG	SPG	BPG	PPG
1990–91	Miami	**76**	26	25.4	.441	.133	.782	3.4	1.4	**0.9**	0.3	12.0
1991–92	Miami	68	**50**	23.3	**.450**	**.400**	.800	**3.6**	**1.8**	0.7	0.5	11.2
1992–93	Miami	26	8	17.3	.383	.333	.717	2.7	0.6	0.5	**0.6**	7.8
1993–94	Miami	53	1	13.2	.438	.200	.759	2.6	0.7	0.3	0.4	7.0
1994–95	Philadelphia	53	31	**29.5**	.401	.385	.824	3.1	**1.8**	0.6	0.4	**15.3**
1996–97	Atlanta	24	2	15.8	.336	.283	**.838**	1.7	0.5	0.3	0.1	6.2
1997–98	San Antonio	13	0	3.3	.381	.333	.667	0.7	0.1	0.2	0.2	2.1
1998–99	Charlotte	3	0	6.0	.143	.000	.500	2.0	0.0	0.0	0.0	1.3
Career		316	118	21.1	.424	.345	.786	2.9	1.2	0.6	0.4	10.3

=== Playoffs ===
Year	Team	GP	GS	MPG	FG%	3P%	FT%	RPG	APG	SPG	BPG	PPG
1994	Miami	2	0	5.5	.250	.000	–	0.0	0.0	0.0	0.0	1.0
Career		2	0	5.5	.250	.000	–	0.0	0.0	0.0	0.0	1.0

== Post-playing career ==
After retiring from the NBA, Burton decided to pursue a career working with athletes on their mental health. He returned to the University of Minnesota and graduated in 2026 with his PhD in Exercise and Sports Psychology.
