= David Benoit (basketball) =

American basketball player (born 1968)

Personal information
- Born: May 9, 1968 (age 58) Lafayette, Louisiana, U.S.
- Listed height: 6 ft 8 in (2.03 m)
- Listed weight: 220 lb (100 kg)

Career information
- High school: Lafayette (Lafayette, Louisiana)
- College: Tyler JC (1986–1988); Alabama (1988–1990)
- NBA draft: 1990: undrafted
- Playing career: 1990–2007
- Position: Small forward
- Number: 21, 2

Career history
- 1990–1991: Unicaja Málaga
- 1991–1996: Utah Jazz
- 1996–1998: New Jersey Nets
- 1998: Orlando Magic
- 1998–1999: Maccabi Tel Aviv
- 2000–2001: Utah Jazz
- 2002: Shanghai Sharks
- 2002–2004: Hitachi SunRockers
- 2004–2005: Utah Snowbears
- 2005–2007: Saitama Broncos

Career highlights
- CBA champion (2002); Third-team All-SEC – UPI (1990)

Career NBA statistics
- Points: 3,455
- Rebounds: 1,983
- Assists: 287
- Stats at NBA.com
- Stats at Basketball Reference

David Benoit (born May 9, 1968) is an American former professional basketball player, in the small forward position.

During his career, he played eight years in the National Basketball Association (NBA), six as a member of the Utah Jazz.

== Personal life ==
Benoit was born in Lafayette, Louisiana. He played high school basketball at Lafayette High School (Louisiana) and also had his jersey retired there. Benoit played in the NJCAA for Tyler Junior College, from 1986 to 1988. His last two years of college basketball were spent with the University of Alabama's Crimson Tide. He is also cousins with ex UFC champion Daniel Cormier.

== Professional career ==
=== Utah Jazz ===
Benoit was not selected in the 1990 NBA draft, playing his first professional season in Spain. In the following year, he joined the Utah Jazz as a free agent.

In 1993, Benoit participated in the NBA Slam Dunk Contest, where he finished fourth out of eight contestants. During the 1994–95 season, he achieved a career-best 10 points and five rebounds per game in 71 regular season contests, to which he added 12 and six in the postseason's first round, as the Jazz were downed 2–3 by the eventual champion Houston Rockets.

=== New Jersey/Orlando ===
After losing his starting position to Chris Morris, Benoit left the Jazz in the 1996 offseason, and signed with the New Jersey Nets. He spent his first season on the sidelines, due to injury.

In early 1998, Benoit was traded, alongside Yinka Dare and Kevin Edwards, to the Orlando Magic, for Brian Evans and Rony Seikaly, appearing in 24 games and averaging six points. He left the United States to play with Maccabi Tel Aviv in Israel, due in part to the 1998 NBA lockout, and remained there for two years.

=== Jazz return ===
In 2000, Benoit returned to the team where he began his career. Now only a fringe player, he averaged 3.6 points in 49 games, as the Jazz once again qualified for the playoffs.

After leaving the NBA at the age of 33 (with averages of exactly seven points and four rebounds, in 492 games), Benoit played for the Shanghai Sharks alongside Yao Ming in the Chinese Basketball Association, winning the 2001–02 league championship. He spent four of the last five seasons of his career in the Japan Basketball League.

== Head coaching record ==
Legend
Regular season	G	Games coached	W	Games won	L	Games lost	W–L %	Win–loss %
Playoffs	PG	Playoff games	PW	Playoff wins	PL	Playoff losses	PW–L %	Playoff win–loss %

Team	Year	G	W	L	W–L%	Finish	PG	PW	PL	PW–L%	Result
Saitama Broncos	2007–08	44	21	23	.477	4th in Eastern	-	-	-	–	-
Saitama Broncos	2008–09	52	19	33	.365	5th in Eastern	-	-	-	–	-
Kyoto Hannaryz	2009–10	42	15	27	.357	Fired	-	-	-	–	-
