= Bimbo Coles =

American basketball player (born 1968)

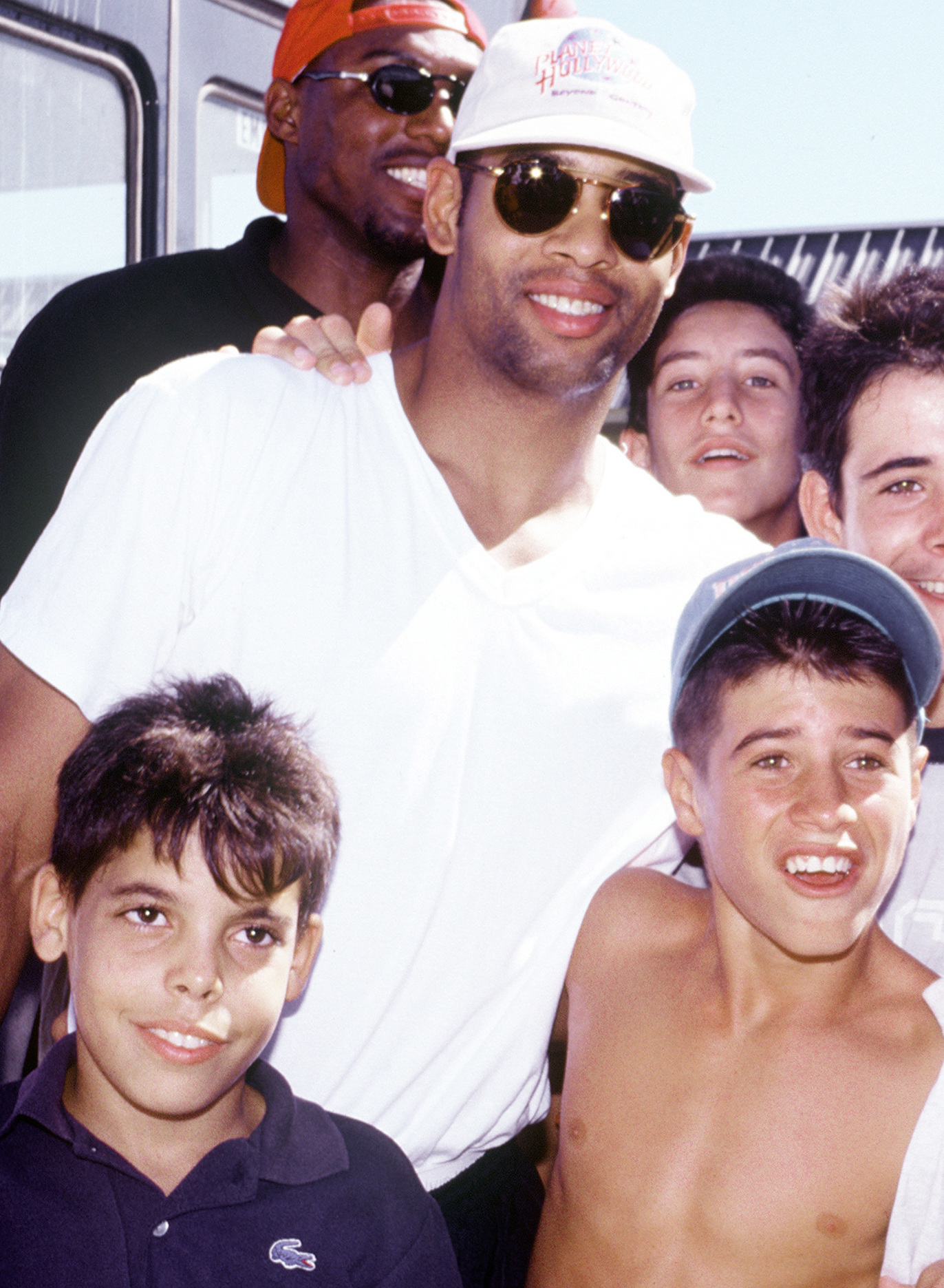
- Coles at Naval Station Guantanamo Bay in 1995

Personal information
- Born: April 22, 1968 (age 58) Covington, Virginia, U.S.
- Listed height: 6 ft 2 in (1.88 m)
- Listed weight: 182 lb (83 kg)

Career information
- High school: Greenbrier East (Lewisburg, West Virginia)
- College: Virginia Tech (1986–1990)
- NBA draft: 1990: 2nd round, 40th overall pick
- Drafted by: Sacramento Kings
- Playing career: 1990–2004
- Position: Point guard
- Number: 12, 50

Career history
- 1990–1996: Miami Heat
- 1996–1999: Golden State Warriors
- 1999–2000: Atlanta Hawks
- 2000–2003: Cleveland Cavaliers
- 2003: Boston Celtics
- 2003–2004: Miami Heat

Career highlights
- Bill Evans Award (1985); Metro Conference co-Player of the Year (1988); 3× First-team All-Metro Conference (1988–1990); No. 12 retired by Virginia Tech Hokies

Career NBA statistics
- Points: 6,628 (7.8 ppg)
- Assists: 3,313 (3.9 apg)
- Steals: 735 (0.9 spg)
- Stats at NBA.com
- Stats at Basketball Reference
Medals
Men's basketball
Representing United States
Olympic Games
Bronze medal – third place	1988 Seoul	United States

Vernell Eufaye "Bimbo" Coles (born April 22, 1968) is an American former professional basketball player who played 14 seasons in the National Basketball Association (NBA). He played college basketball for the Virginia Tech Hokies and won an Olympic bronze medal as a member of the United States national team in 1988. He received his nickname from a cousin in reference to a country music song of the same name.

Coles was a standout at Greenbrier East High School in Lewisburg, West Virginia. At Greenbrier East, Coles played basketball, baseball and football. Coles was more heavily recruited to play college football than basketball before announcing his intent to play basketball in college. In football, he was twice named all-state and once named All-America. As a shortstop and outfielder, Coles claimed to be selected by the Philadelphia Phillies in the 1986 Major League Baseball draft. He was recruited to play college basketball at Virginia Tech, Maryland and West Virginia.

He played college basketball for the Virginia Tech Hokies for four seasons from 1986 to 1990. Coles set the school and Metro Conference records for career points and the school record for career assists. He was inducted into the Virginia Tech Sports Hall of Fame and West Virginia Sports Hall of Fame. He was a member of the United States national basketball team which won a bronze medal in the 1988 Summer Olympics. Despite not having played baseball since high school, Coles was drafted by the California Angels in the final round of the 1990 Major League Baseball draft.

His NBA career started when he was selected by the Sacramento Kings in the 1990 NBA draft, and immediately traded to the Miami Heat in exchange for veteran guard Rory Sparrow. After Coles' first of two stints with the Miami Heat, he was traded to the Golden State Warriors, and also played with the Atlanta Hawks, Cleveland Cavaliers, and Boston Celtics. He was utilized primarily as a backup point guard.

Coles' brother, Sidney, played basketball for two years at Memphis and for two years at Marshall, one of which was under head coach Billy Donovan. In 2000, Sidney was hired as an assistant coach at Wyoming under head coach Steve McClain. Until 2021, Coles coached at his alma mater of Greenbrier East High School in Lewisburg, West Virginia.
