= 1990 NBA draft =

Basketball player selection

General information
- Sport: Basketball
- Date: June 27, 1990
- Location: Felt Forum, Madison Square Garden (New York City, New York)
- Network: TNT

Overview
- 54 total selections in 2 rounds
- League: NBA
- First selection: Derrick Coleman (New Jersey Nets)
- Hall of Famers: 2: PG Gary Payton; SF Toni Kukoč

The 1990 NBA draft took place on June 27, 1990, in New York City, New York. One of the standouts of this draft is Basketball Hall of Famer Gary Payton. He became a nine-time All-Star, achieved the NBA Defensive Player of the Year award in 1996, won an NBA Championship with the Miami Heat in 2006, holds many statistical records during his tenure with the since rebranded and relocated Seattle SuperSonics, and was inducted in the Hall of Fame in 2013.

The top pick of the draft was Syracuse's Derrick Coleman who was selected by the New Jersey Nets. In total, 52 of the 54 players selected went on to play at least one competitive game in the NBA, and six players were at some point of their career selected to play in the NBA All-Star Game. One player who had been projected to be a lottery pick as well as possibly the number one by media outlets and draft analysts was Loyola Marymount's Hank Gathers, who died of a heart condition in March 1990 after collapsing during a game.

Not including Gathers, six former first-round picks from this draft are deceased as of 2026: Felton Spencer, Alec Kessler, Jerrod Mustaf, Dwayne Schintzius, Lance Blanks, and Elden Campbell.

== Draft selections ==
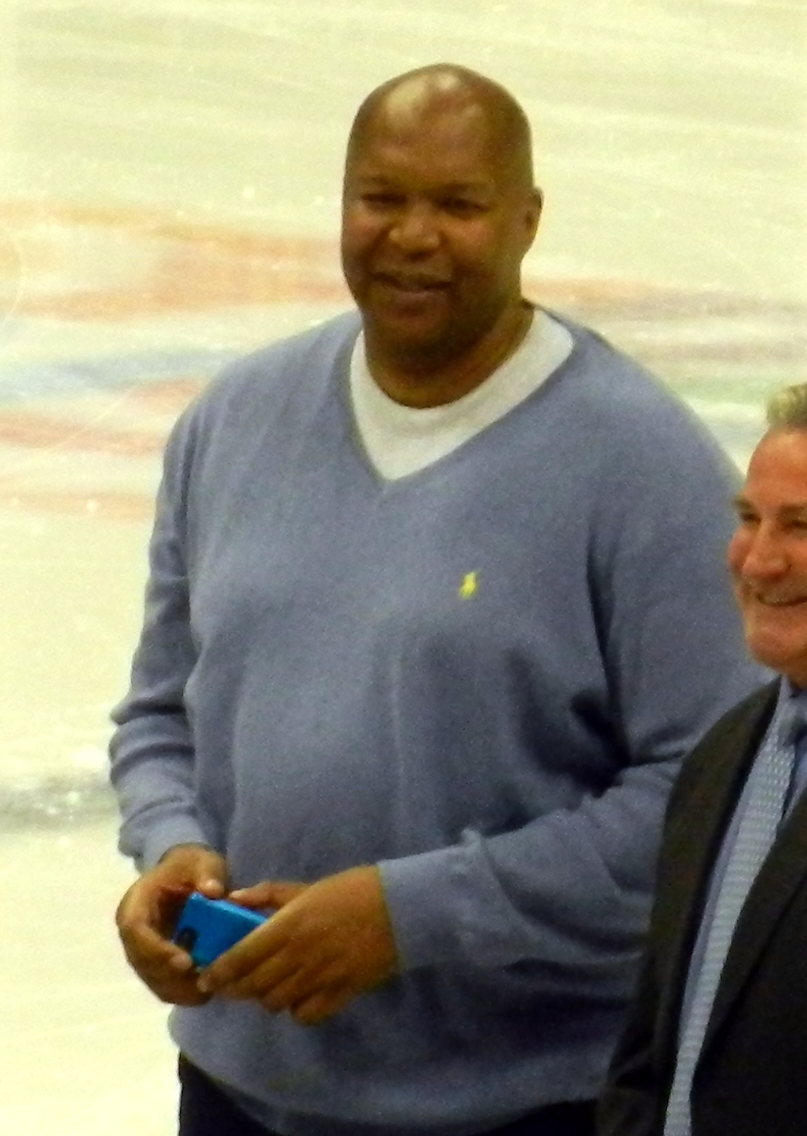
Derrick Coleman was selected 1st overall by the New Jersey Nets.

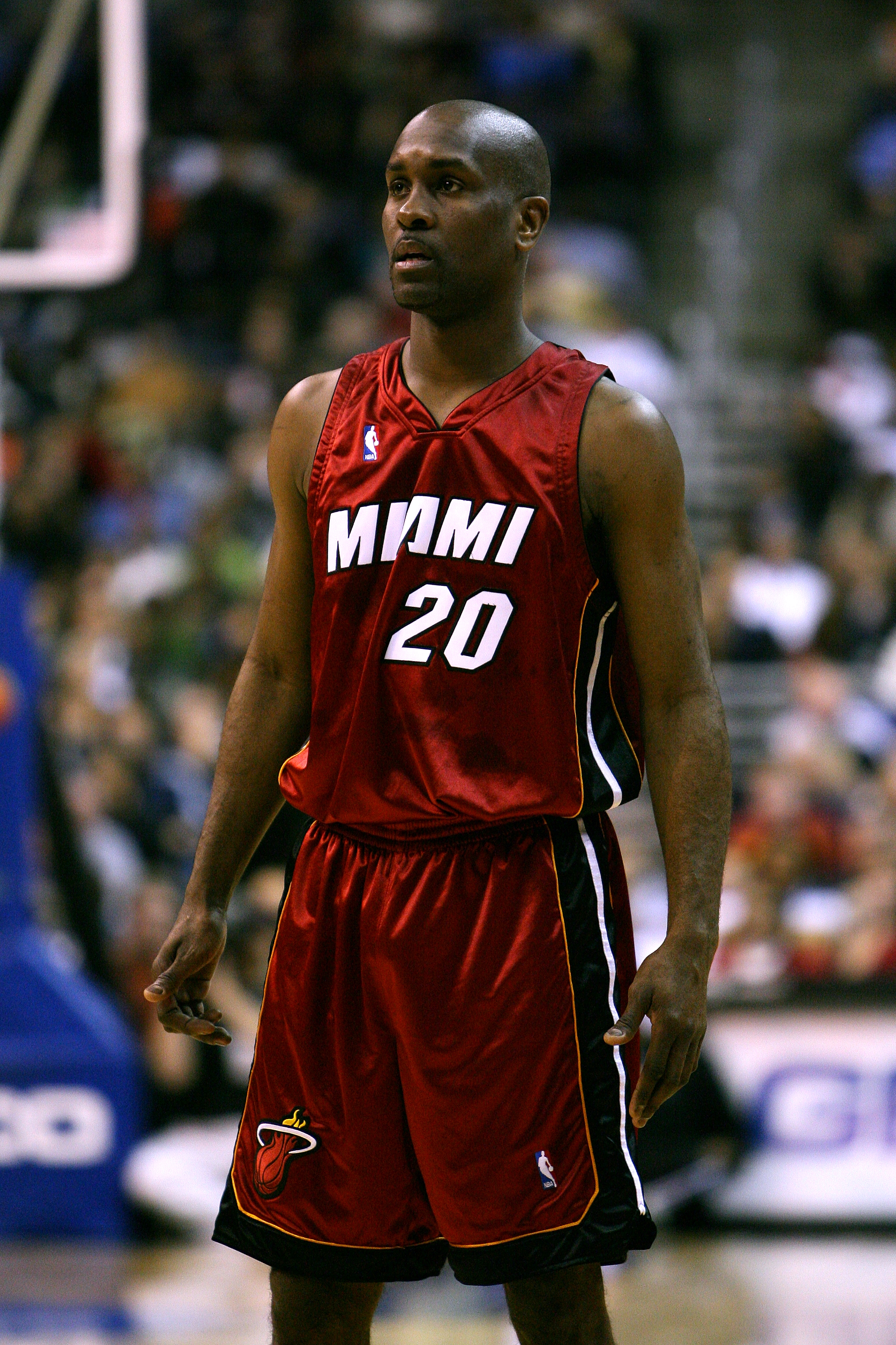
Gary Payton was selected 2nd overall by the Seattle SuperSonics.

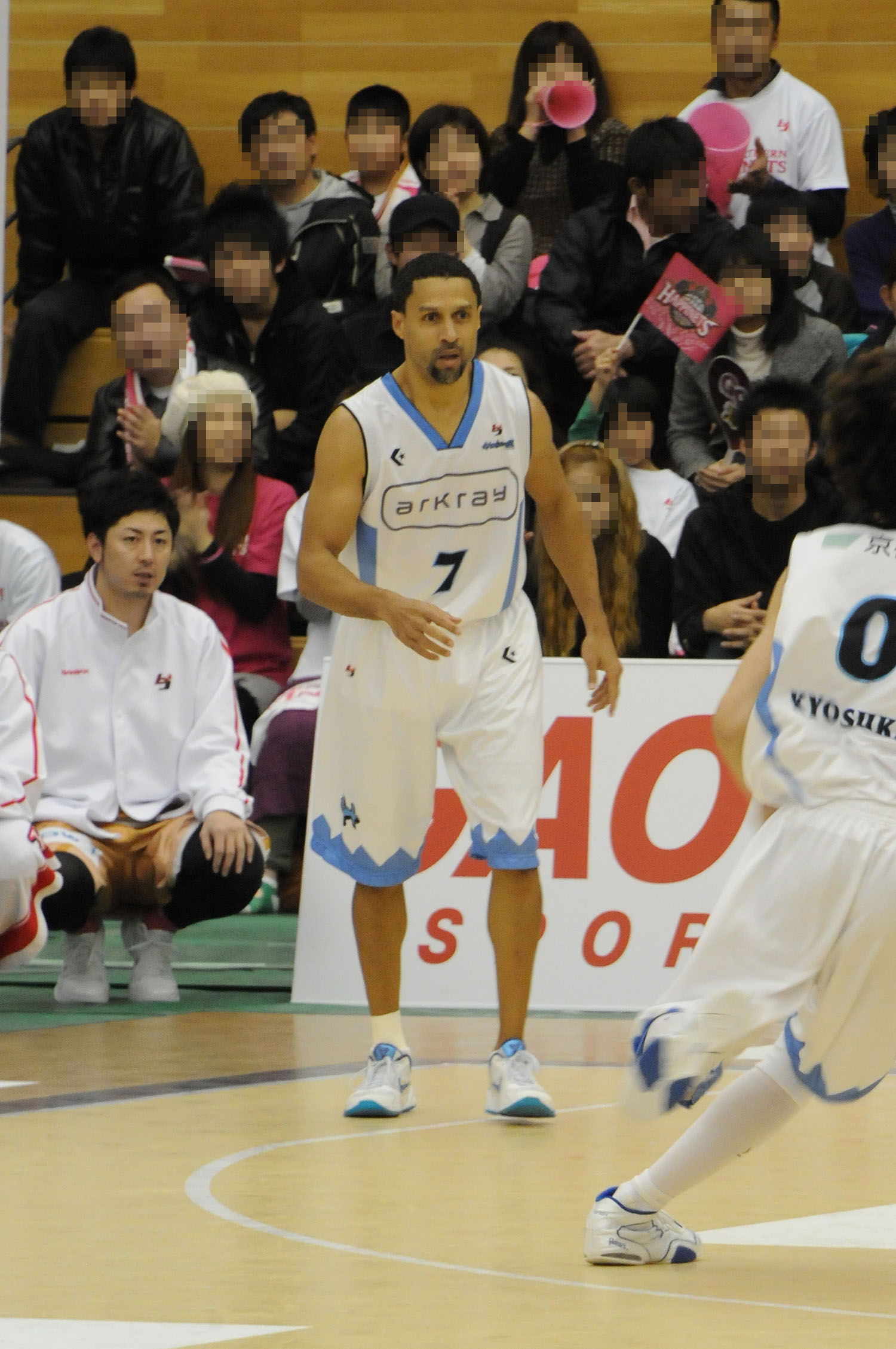
Chris Jackson (later Mahmoud Abdul-Rauf) was selected 3rd overall by the Denver Nuggets.

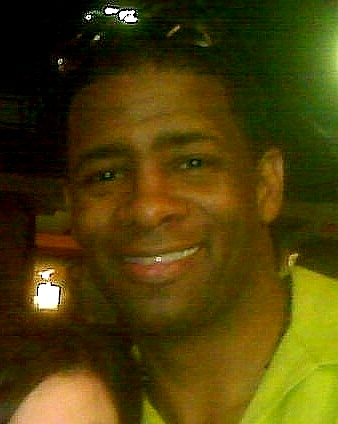
Kendall Gill was selected 5th overall by the Charlotte Hornets.

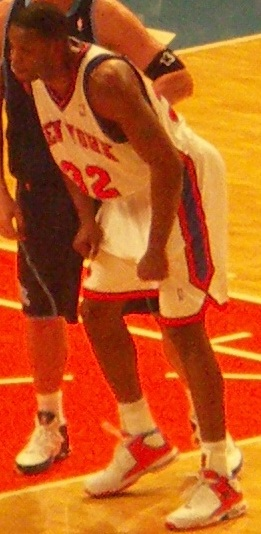
Antonio Davis was selected 45th overall by the Indiana Pacers.

PG	Point guard	SG	Shooting guard	SF	Small forward	PF	Power forward	C	Center

^	Denotes player who has been inducted to the Naismith Memorial Basketball Hall of Fame
*	Denotes player who has been selected for at least one All-Star Game and All-NBA Team
^{+}	Denotes player who has been selected for at least one All-Star Game
^{x}	Denotes player who has been selected for at least one All-NBA Team
^{#}	Denotes player who has never appeared in an NBA regular-season or playoff game
^{~}	Denotes player who has been selected as Rookie of the Year

Round	Pick	Player	Pos.	Nationality (Note: Nationality indicates the player's national team or representative nationality. If a player has not competed at the international level, then the nationality indicates the national team which the player is eligible to represent according to FIBA rules.)	NBA team	School/Club team
1	1	Derrick Coleman^{*~}	PF/C	United States	New Jersey Nets	Syracuse (Sr.)
1	2	Gary Payton^{^}	PG	United States	Seattle SuperSonics (from Golden State)	Oregon State (Sr.)
1	3	Chris Jackson (Note: Chris Jackson changed his name to Mahmoud Abdul-Rauf in 1993.)	PG	United States	Denver Nuggets (from Miami)	LSU (So.)
1	4	Dennis Scott	SG/SF	United States	Orlando Magic	Georgia Tech (Jr.)
1	5	Kendall Gill	SG	United States	Charlotte Hornets	Illinois (Sr.)
1	6	Felton Spencer	C	United States	Minnesota Timberwolves	Louisville (Sr.)
1	7	Lionel Simmons	SF	United States	Sacramento Kings	La Salle (Sr.)
1	8	Bo Kimble	SG	United States	Los Angeles Clippers	Loyola Marymount (Sr.)
1	9	Willie Burton	SG	United States	Miami Heat (from Washington via Dallas and Denver)	Minnesota (Sr.)
1	10	Rumeal Robinson	PG	United States	Atlanta Hawks (from Golden State)	Michigan (Sr.)
1	11	Tyrone Hill^{+}	PF	United States	Golden State Warriors (from Atlanta)	Xavier (Sr.)
1	12	Alec Kessler	PF	United States	Houston Rockets (traded to Miami for Carl Herrera and the rights to Dave Jamerson)	Georgia (Sr.)
1	13	Loy Vaught	PF	United States	Los Angeles Clippers (from Cleveland)	Michigan (Sr.)
1	14	Travis Mays	PG	United States	Sacramento Kings (from Indiana via Dallas)	Texas (Sr.)
1	15	Dave Jamerson	SG	United States	Miami Heat (from Denver; traded with Carl Herrera to Houston for the rights to Alec Kessler)	Ohio (Sr.)
1	16	Terry Mills	SF	United States	Milwaukee Bucks	Michigan (Sr.)
1	17	Jerrod Mustaf	PF/C	United States	New York Knicks	Maryland (So.)
1	18	Duane Causwell	C	United States	Sacramento Kings (from Dallas)	Temple (Sr.)
1	19	Dee Brown	SG	United States	Boston Celtics	Jacksonville (Sr.)
1	20	Gerald Glass	SF/SG	United States	Minnesota Timberwolves (from Philadelphia)	Ole Miss (Sr.)
1	21	Jayson Williams^{+}	PF/C	United States	Phoenix Suns	St. John's (Sr.)
1	22	Tate George	SG	United States	New Jersey Nets (from Chicago)	Connecticut (Sr.)
1	23	Anthony Bonner	PF/SF	United States	Sacramento Kings (from Utah)	Saint Louis (Sr.)
1	24	Dwayne Schintzius	C	United States	San Antonio Spurs	Florida (Sr.)
1	25	Alaa Abdelnaby	PF	United States	Portland Trail Blazers	Duke (Sr.)
1	26	Lance Blanks	PG/SG	United States	Detroit Pistons	Texas (Sr.)
1	27	Elden Campbell	PF/C	United States	Los Angeles Lakers	Clemson (Sr.)
2	28	Les Jepsen	C	United States	Golden State Warriors	Iowa (Sr.)
2	29	Toni Kukoč^{^}	SF	Yugoslavia	Chicago Bulls (from Orlando)	KK Split (Yugoslavia)
2	30	Carl Herrera	PF	Venezuela	Miami Heat	Houston (Jr.)
2	31	Negele Knight	PG	United States	Phoenix Suns	Dayton (Sr.)
2	32	Brian Oliver	SG	United States	Philadelphia 76ers	Georgia Tech (Sr.)
2	33	Walter Palmer	C	United States	Utah Jazz	Dartmouth (Sr.)
2	34	Kevin Pritchard	PG	United States	Golden State Warriors	Kansas (Sr.)
2	35	Greg Foster	PF/C	United States	Washington Bullets	UTEP (Sr.)
2	36	Trevor Wilson	SF	United States	Atlanta Hawks	UCLA (Sr.)
2	37	A. J. English	SG	United States	Washington Bullets	Virginia Union (Sr.)
2	38	Jud Buechler	SF	United States	Seattle SuperSonics	Arizona (Sr.)
2	39	Steve Scheffler	C/PF	United States	Charlotte Hornets	Purdue (Sr.)
2	40	Bimbo Coles	PG	United States	Sacramento Kings	Virginia Tech (Sr.)
2	41	Steve Bardo	SG	United States	Atlanta Hawks	Illinois (Sr.)
2	42	Marcus Liberty	SF	United States	Denver Nuggets	Illinois (So.)
2	43	Tony Massenburg	PF/C	United States	San Antonio Spurs	Maryland (Sr.)
2	44	Steve Henson	PG	United States	Milwaukee Bucks	Kansas State (Sr.)
2	45	Antonio Davis^{+}	PF/C	United States	Indiana Pacers	UTEP (Sr.)
2	46	Kenny Williams	SF/PF	United States	Indiana Pacers	Barton CC (Fr.)
2	47	Derek Strong	PF	United States	Philadelphia 76ers	Xavier (Jr.)
2	48	Cedric Ceballos^{+}	SF	United States	Phoenix Suns	Cal State Fullerton (Sr.)
2	49	Phil Henderson^{#}	SG	United States	Dallas Mavericks	Duke (Sr.)
2	50	Miloš Babić	C	Yugoslavia	Phoenix Suns	Tennessee Tech (Jr.)
2	51	Tony Smith	SG/PG	United States	Los Angeles Lakers (from San Antonio)	Marquette (Sr.)
2	52	Stefano Rusconi	PF/C	Italy	Cleveland Cavaliers	Ranger Varese (Italy)
2	53	Abdul Shamsid-Deen^{#}	C	United States	Seattle SuperSonics	Providence (Sr.)
2	54	Sean Higgins	SG/SF	United States	San Antonio Spurs (from L.A. Lakers)	Michigan (Jr.)

== Notable undrafted players ==
These players were not selected in the 1990 draft but played at least one game in the NBA.

Player	Position	Nationality	School/Club team
Keith Askins	F	United States	Alabama (Sr.)
Cedric Ball	SF	United States	Charlotte (Sr.)
David Benoit	SF	United States	Alabama (Sr.)
Matt Bullard	F	United States	Iowa (Sr.)
Rick Calloway	SG	United States	Kansas (Sr.)
Richard Coffey	SF	United States	Minnesota (Sr.)
Marty Conlon	PF/C	Ireland	Providence (Sr.)
Michael Curry	SG/SF	United States	Georgia Southern (Sr.)
Dan Godfread	C	United States	Evansville (Sr.)
Andrés Guibert	PF/C	Cuba	Cantera Instituto Manuel Fajardo (Cuba)
Tony Harris	SG	United States	New Orleans (Sr.)
Skeeter Henry	SG	United States	Oklahoma (Sr.)
Brian Howard	SF	United States	NC State (Sr.)
Kurk Lee	PG	United States	Towson (Sr.)
Ian Lockhart	SF	The Bahamas	Tennessee (Sr.)
Tharon Mayes	SG	United States	Florida State (Sr.)
Chris Munk	PF	United States	USC (Sr.)
Melvin Newbern	SG	United States	Minnesota (Sr.)
Dan O'Sullivan	C/PF	United States	Fordham (Sr.)
Alan Ogg	C	United States	UAB (Sr.)
Anthony Pullard	PF	United States	McNeese State (Sr.)
Eldridge Recasner	G	United States	Washington (Sr.)
Larry Robinson	SF/SG	United States	Centenary (Sr.)
Irving Thomas	PF	United States	Florida State (Sr.)
Stephen Thompson	SG	United States	Syracuse (Sr.)
Andy Toolson	SG/SF	United States	BYU (Sr.)
Scott Williams	C/PF	United States	North Carolina (Sr.)

== Early entrants ==
=== College underclassmen ===
For the eighth year in a row and the twelfth time in thirteen years, no college underclassman would withdraw their entry into the NBA draft. Not only that, but this would be the fifth year in a row where a player that qualified for the status of a "college underclassman" would be playing professional basketball overseas, with former Grambling State University player Jesse Spinner going to Austria to play professionally for the Sefra Tyrolia. Including him, that expands the number of underclassmen for this year out to fourteen total players. Regardless, the following college basketball players successfully applied for early draft entrance.

- (United States) Kelvin Ardister – F, Idaho (junior)
- (United States) Herb Barthol – C, Cleveland State (junior)
- (Venezuela) Gabriel Estaba – F, South Alabama (junior)
- (United States) David Shon Henderson – G, Idaho (junior)
- (Venezuela) Carl Herrera – F, Houston (junior)
- (United States) Sean Higgins – F, Michigan (junior)
- (United States) Chris Jackson – G, LSU (sophomore)
- (United States) Marcus Liberty – F, Illinois (junior)
- (United States) Kenny Miller – F, Barton County CC (junior)
- (United States) Jerrod Mustaf – F, Maryland (sophomore)
- (United States) Dennis Scott – F, Georgia Tech (junior)
- (Sweden) Per Stumer – F, Loyola Marymount (junior)
- (United States) Kenny Williams – F, Elizabeth City State (sophomore)

=== Other eligible players ===
This would be the fifth year in a row with at least one player that previously played in college entering the NBA draft as an underclassman, as well as the first year where a player didn't go out to either Italy or France to play overseas professionally first.

Player	Team	Note	Ref.
(United States) Jesse Spinner	Sefra Tyrolia (Austria)	Left Grambling State in 1988; playing professionally since the 1989–90 season	

== Invited attendees ==
The 1990 NBA draft is considered to be the thirteenth NBA draft to have utilized what's properly considered the "green room" experience for NBA prospects. The NBA's green room is a staging area where anticipated draftees often sit with their families and representatives, waiting for their names to be called on draft night. Often being positioned either in front of or to the side of the podium (in this case, being positioned within the nearby Jacob Javits Center), once a player heard his name, he would walk to the podium to shake hands and take promotional photos with the NBA commissioner. From there, the players often conducted interviews with various media outlets while backstage. From there, the players often conducted interviews with various media outlets while backstage. However, once the NBA draft started to air nationally on TV starting with the 1980 NBA draft, the green room evolved from players waiting to hear their name called and then shaking hands with these select players who were often called to the hotel to take promotional pictures with the NBA commissioner a day or two after the draft concluded to having players in real-time waiting to hear their names called up and then shaking hands with David Stern, the NBA's commissioner at the time. The NBA compiled its list of green room invites through collective voting by the NBA's team presidents and general managers alike, which in this year's case belonged to only what they believed were the top 17 prospects at the time. Despite the large amount of invites and them successfully avoiding any inviting prospects waiting into the second round (following the tragic passing of potential #1 pick Hank Gathers), some notable absences from this group include Tyrone Hill from Xavier University, Jayson Williams from St. John's University, future Hall of Famer Toni Kukoč, Antonio Davis from UTEP, and Cedric Ceballos from Cal State Fullerton. Even so, the following players were invited to attend this year's draft festivities live and in person.

- (United States) / (Egypt) Alaa Abdelnaby – PF/C, Duke
- (United States) Dee Brown – SG, Jacksonville
- (United States) Willie Burton – SG, Minnesota
- (United States) Duane Causwell – C, Temple
- (United States) Derrick Coleman – PF/C, Syracuse
- (United States) Kendall Gill – SG, Illinois
- (United States) Chris Jackson – PG, LSU
- (United States) Alec Kessler – PF, Georgia
- (United States) Bo Kimble – SG, Loyola Marymount
- (United States) Travis Mays – PG, Texas
- (United States) Gary Payton – PG, Oregon State
- (United States) Rumeal Robinson – PG, Michigan
- (United States) Dwayne Schintzius – C, Florida
- (United States) Dennis Scott – SG/SF, Georgia Tech
- (United States) Lionel Simmons – SF, La Salle
- (United States) Felton Spencer – C, Louisville
- (United States) Loy Vaught – PF, Michigan

== See also ==
- List of first overall NBA draft picks
