= Matt Geiger =

American basketball player (born 1969)

Personal information
- Born: September 10, 1969 (age 57) Salem, Massachusetts, U.S.
- Listed height: 7 ft 0 in (2.13 m)
- Listed weight: 243 lb (110 kg)

Career information
- High school: Countryside (Clearwater, Florida)
- College: Auburn (1987–1989); Georgia Tech (1990–1992)
- NBA draft: 1992: 2nd round, 42nd overall pick
- Drafted by: Miami Heat
- Playing career: 1992–2001
- Position: Center
- Number: 52

Career history
- 1992–1995: Miami Heat
- 1995–1998: Charlotte Hornets
- 1999–2001: Philadelphia 76ers

Career NBA statistics
- Points: 5,059 (9.2 ppg)
- Rebounds: 3,158 (5.7 rpg)
- Assist: 388 (0.7 apg)
- Stats at NBA.com
- Stats at Basketball Reference

Matthew Allen Geiger (born September 10, 1969) is an American former professional National Basketball Association (NBA) player who played at the center position.

== College career ==
Geiger played for Countryside High School in Clearwater, Florida and was recruited to play college basketball at Auburn University. He played with Auburn before transferring to Georgia Tech for more playing time.

== NBA career ==
His successful college career led Geiger to be selected by the Miami Heat in the second round (42nd pick overall) of the 1992 NBA draft. He played in the NBA for 10 seasons from 1992 to 2002 with 3 teams: Miami Heat, Charlotte Hornets, and Philadelphia 76ers.

In the summer of 2000, Matt Geiger's refusal to waive a $5 million trade kicker clause in his contract stopped a four-team deal between Philadelphia, the Hornets, the Detroit Pistons and the L.A. Lakers that would have sent All-Star player Allen Iverson to the Pistons. He was suspended for 2 games during the 2000–01 season for a violation of the NBA/NBPA's steroid policy.

Geiger signed a contract in 2001 with the Philadelphia 76ers but knee injuries forced him to retire in 2002 after a ten-year career. For his career, he averaged 9.2 points and 5.7 rebounds per game.

== Career statistics ==
Legend
GP	Games played	GS	Games started	MPG	Minutes per game
FG%	Field goal percentage	3P%	3-point field goal percentage	FT%	Free throw percentage
RPG	Rebounds per game	APG	Assists per game	SPG	Steals per game
BPG	Blocks per game	PPG	Points per game	**Bold**	Career high
*	Led the league

=== College ===
Year	Team	GP	GS	MPG	FG%	3P%	FT%	RPG	APG	SPG	BPG	PPG
1987–88	Auburn	30	13	19.9	.513	–	.660	4.1	.8	.4	.3	6.4
1988–89	Auburn	28	28	**28.8**	.504	.000	.688	6.6	**1.2**	.6	.9	**15.9**
1989–90	Georgia Tech	Transfer										
1990–91	Georgia Tech	27	24	26.3	.549	.000	.671	6.4	1.0	.2	1.1	11.4
1991–92	Georgia Tech	**35**	**35**	27.2	**.611**	.000	**.706**	**7.3**	1.1	**.7**	**1.9**	11.8
Career		120	100	25.6	.545	.000	.687	6.1	1.0	.5	1.1	11.4

=== NBA ===
==== Regular season ====
Year	Team	GP	GS	MPG	FG%	3P%	FT%	RPG	APG	SPG	BPG	PPG
1992–93	Miami	48	2	11.5	.524	.000	.674	2.5	.3	.3	.4	4.5
1993–94	Miami	72	0	16.7	**.574**	.200	.779	4.2	.4	.5	.4	7.2
1994–95	Miami	74	43	23.1	.536	**.400**	.650	5.6	.7	.6	.7	8.3
1995–96	Charlotte	77	**50**	30.5	.536	.375	.727	**8.4**	.8	.6	.8	11.2
1996–97	Charlotte	49	13	21.3	.489	.300	.701	5.3	.8	.4	.6	8.9
1997–98	Charlotte	**78**	42	23.6	.505	.091	.712	6.7	1.0	**.9**	**1.1**	11.3
1998–99	Philadelphia	50*	40	**30.8**	.479	.200	**.797**	7.2	**1.2**	.8	.8	**13.5**
1999–00	Philadelphia	65	20	21.6	.441	.000	.779	6.0	.6	.4	.3	9.7
2000–01	Philadelphia	35	4	15.5	.393	.000	.685	4.0	.4	.3	.2	6.1
2001–02	Philadelphia	4	0	8.8	.125	–	.500	1.5	.0	.0	.5	.8
Career		552	214	22.1	.499	.232	.728	5.7	.7	.6	.6	9.2

==== Playoffs ====
Year	Team	GP	GS	MPG	FG%	3P%	FT%	RPG	APG	SPG	BPG	PPG
1994	Miami	2	0	5.5	.000	–	.500	2.0	.0	.0	.0	.5
1997	Charlotte	3	0	10.3	.667	–	**1.000**	2.7	.7	.7	.3	2.0
1998	Charlotte	4	0	5.5	.167	–	–	1.3	.3	.0	.0	.5
1999	Philadelphia	8	**8**	**29.9**	.438	.000	.828	**7.6**	**.8**	**1.1**	**.8**	**13.5**
2000	Philadelphia	8	0	16.0	**.500**	–	.800	5.0	.3	.6	.3	8.8
2001	Philadelphia	**12**	0	8.3	.586	–	**1.000**	1.5	.6	.2	.0	3.2
Career		37	8	14.4	.468	.000	.823	3.7	.5	.5	.2	6.1

== Personal life ==
Geiger resides in Tarpon Springs, Florida where he is a real estate investor. His 28,000-square-foot (2,600 m^{2}) estate, reported as the largest in the county, sold on January 3, 2011, for 8 million dollars. The Punisher used this home as the residence of John Travolta's character Mr. Saint.

In January 1992, during Geiger's senior year at Georgia Tech, his fraternal twin Mark Geiger was diagnosed with Hodgkin's disease at the age of 22. Because his brother lost his hair during chemotherapy, Matt Geiger shaved his head during his NBA career in support of his brother.
