= 1990–91 NBA season =

45th NBA season

- League: National Basketball Association
- Sport: Basketball
- Duration: November 2, 1990 – April 21, 1991; April 25 – May 30, 1991 (Playoffs); June 2 – 12, 1991 (Finals)
- Teams: 27
- TV partner(s): NBC, TBS, TNT

Draft
- Top draft pick: Derrick Coleman
- Picked by: New Jersey Nets

Regular season
- Top seed: Portland Trail Blazers
- Season MVP: Michael Jordan (Chicago)
- Top scorer: Michael Jordan (Chicago)

Playoffs
- Eastern champions: Chicago Bulls
- Eastern runners-up: Detroit Pistons
- Western champions: Los Angeles Lakers
- Western runners-up: Portland Trail Blazers

Finals
- Champions: Chicago Bulls
- Runners-up: Los Angeles Lakers
- Finals MVP: Michael Jordan (Chicago)

NBA seasons
- ← 1989–90 1991–92 →

The 1990–91 NBA season was the 45th season of the National Basketball Association. The season ended with the Chicago Bulls winning their first NBA championship, eliminating the Los Angeles Lakers 4 games to 1 in the NBA Finals.

This season would prove to be Magic Johnson's last full season as a player, as he announced he was HIV positive and retired early the following season (Johnson would play part of the 1995–96 NBA season with the Lakers before permanently retiring).

== Notable occurrences ==
Coaching changes
Offseason
Team	1989–90 coach	1990–91 coach
Atlanta Hawks	Mike Fratello	Bob Weiss
Boston Celtics	Jimmy Rodgers	Chris Ford
Denver Nuggets	Doug Moe	Paul Westhead
Los Angeles Clippers	Don Casey	Mike Schuler
Los Angeles Lakers	Pat Riley	Mike Dunleavy, Sr.
New York Knicks	Stu Jackson	John MacLeod
Seattle SuperSonics	Bernie Bickerstaff	K.C. Jones
In-season NBA 91 release date: October 22, 1990
Team	Outgoing coach	Incoming coach
Indiana Pacers	Dick Versace	Bob Hill

- The Trent Tucker Rule was adopted. When Trent Tucker hit a walk-off three-point field goal at the buzzer in the previous season, the clock had started with 0.1 left. It prevents any shot to be taken with up to 0.2 seconds left in the period; the lone exception was a tip-in.
- The Los Angeles Lakers failed to win their division for the first time in ten years. The Pacific Division was won by the Portland Trail Blazers.
- The Orlando Magic moved to the Midwest Division of the Western Conference, but like the Miami Heat two seasons ago, experienced long road trips back and forth out west. They would move to the Atlantic Division the next season.
- The 1991 NBA All-Star Game was played at the Charlotte Coliseum in Charlotte, North Carolina, with the East defeating the West 116–114. Charles Barkley of the Philadelphia 76ers won the game's MVP award. In the Three-Point Shootout, Chicago Bulls guard Craig Hodges set a record by making 19 consecutive shots, en route to winning his second straight shootout title, and Boston Celtics guard Dee Brown won the Slam Dunk Contest.
- The Minnesota Timberwolves played their first season at the Target Center. They had played their first season at Hubert H. Humphrey Metrodome while Target Center was being built.
- The NBA on NBC began (replacing The NBA on CBS) when the National Broadcasting Company signed a 4-year, US$600 million deal with the NBA. The relationship lasted 12 years (concluding at the end of the 2001–02 NBA season), until The NBA on ABC returned in 2002–03.
- On December 30, the last game of 1990, Scott Skiles of Orlando recorded 30 assists in a game against the Denver Nuggets to set a new NBA record.
- The Utah Jazz played their final season at the Salt Palace.
- The flagrant foul was instituted.
- For the first time since 1981, the Los Angeles Lakers were not the Number 1 seed in the Western Conference. However they still reached the NBA Finals by upsetting the heavily favored (and Number 1 seeded) Portland Trail Blazers in six games. They would go on to lose to the Chicago Bulls in five games, their last NBA Finals appearance until 2000.
- During the season, all NBA teams sport patches featuring the American flag on their warmups as an honor to the American soldiers fighting during the Persian Gulf War. Champion became the league's official outfitter.
- The Golden State Warriors became the only seventh seeded team to beat the second seed twice since the 16-team playoff field was introduced seven years earlier. The Warriors defeated the San Antonio Spurs in four games.
- The NBA becomes the first major professional sports league to play outside North America, as the Phoenix Suns and Utah Jazz open the season against each other in Tokyo, Japan.
- On March 9, 1991, the Houston Rockets' Akeem Olajuwon officially changed the spelling of his first name to Hakeem.

== 1990–91 NBA changes ==
- The Indiana Pacers changed their logo and uniforms, adding navy to their color scheme.
- The Minnesota Timberwolves moved into Target Center.
- The New Jersey Nets changed their logo and uniforms.
- The New York Knicks slightly changed their uniforms replacing their alternate "NY" logo on the left leg of their shorts with their current primary logo.
- The Sacramento Kings changed their uniforms, adding a darker blue colour from their primary logo.

== Final standings ==
=== By division ===
Eastern Conference

Atlantic Division	W	L	PCT	GB	Home	Road	Div
y-Boston Celtics	56	26	.683	—	35–6	21–20	20-6
x-Philadelphia 76ers	44	38	.537	12	29-12	15-26	14-12
x-New York Knicks	39	43	.476	17	21-20	18-23	17–9
Washington Bullets	30	52	.366	26	21-20	9-32	10-16
New Jersey Nets	26	56	.317	30	20-21	6–35	8-18
Miami Heat	24	58	.293	32	18-23	6-35	9-17

Central Division	W	L	PCT	GB	Home	Road	Div
y-Chicago Bulls	61	21	.744	—	35–6	26–15	25–5
x-Detroit Pistons	50	32	.610	11	32–9	18–23	19–11
x-Milwaukee Bucks	48	34	.585	13	33–8	15–26	16–14
x-Atlanta Hawks	43	39	.524	18	29–12	14–27	11–19
x-Indiana Pacers	41	41	.500	20	29–12	12–29	15–15
Cleveland Cavaliers	33	49	.402	28	23–18	10–31	11–19
Charlotte Hornets	26	56	.317	35	17–24	9–32	8–22

Western Conference

Midwest Division	W	L	PCT	GB	Home	Road	Div
y-San Antonio Spurs	55	27	.671	—	33–8	22–19	20–8
x-Utah Jazz	54	28	.659	1	36–5	18–23	21-7
x-Houston Rockets	52	30	.634	3	31-10	21–20	20-8
Orlando Magic	31	51	.378	24	24-17	7–34	13–15
Minnesota Timberwolves	29	53	.354	26	21-20	8-33	9-19
Dallas Mavericks	28	54	.341	27	20-21	8–33	7-21
Denver Nuggets	20	62	.244	35	17-24	3-38	8–20

Pacific Division	W	L	PCT	GB	Home	Road	Div
y-Portland Trail Blazers	63	19	.768	—	36–5	27–14	18-10
x-Los Angeles Lakers	58	24	.707	5	33–8	25-16	19-9
x-Phoenix Suns	55	27	.671	8	32–9	23-18	17–11
x-Golden State Warriors	44	38	.537	19	30–11	14–27	13–15
x-Seattle SuperSonics	41	41	.500	22	28-13	13–28	12-16
Los Angeles Clippers	31	51	.378	32	23–18	8-33	10-18
Sacramento Kings	25	57	.305	38	24-17	1–40	9–19

=== By conference ===
#	Eastern Conference				
#	Team	W	L	PCT	GB
1	c-Chicago Bulls	61	21	.744	–
2	y-Boston Celtics	56	26	.683	5
3	x-Detroit Pistons	50	32	.610	11
4	x-Milwaukee Bucks	48	34	.585	13
5	x-Philadelphia 76ers	44	38	.537	17
6	x-Atlanta Hawks	43	39	.524	18
7	x-Indiana Pacers	41	41	.500	20
8	x-New York Knicks	39	43	.476	22
9	Cleveland Cavaliers	33	49	.402	28
10	Washington Bullets	30	52	.366	31
11	New Jersey Nets	26	56	.317	35
12	Charlotte Hornets	26	56	.317	35
13	Miami Heat	24	58	.293	37

#	Western Conference				
#	Team	W	L	PCT	GB
1	z-Portland Trail Blazers	63	19	.768	–
2	y-San Antonio Spurs	55	27	.671	8
3	x-Los Angeles Lakers	58	24	.707	5
4	x-Phoenix Suns	55	27	.671	8
5	x-Utah Jazz	54	28	.659	9
6	x-Houston Rockets	52	30	.634	11
7	x-Golden State Warriors	44	38	.537	19
8	x-Seattle SuperSonics	41	41	.500	22
9	Orlando Magic	31	51	.378	32
10	Los Angeles Clippers	31	51	.378	32
11	Minnesota Timberwolves	29	53	.354	34
12	Dallas Mavericks	28	54	.341	35
13	Sacramento Kings	25	57	.305	38
14	Denver Nuggets	20	62	.244	43

Notes

- z – Clinched home court advantage for the entire playoffs
- c – Clinched home court advantage for the conference playoffs
- y – Clinched division title
- x – Clinched playoff spot

== Playoffs ==
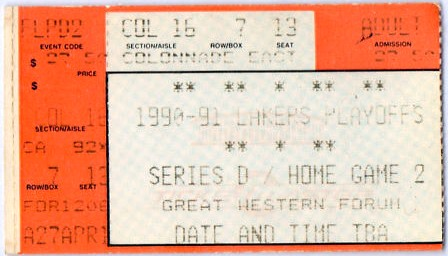
A ticket for Game 4 of the 1991 NBA Finals at the Great Western Forum.

Teams in bold advanced to the next round. The numbers to the left of each team indicate the team's seeding in its conference, and the numbers to the right indicate the number of games the team won in that round. The division champions are marked by an asterisk. Home court advantage does not necessarily belong to the higher-seeded team, but instead the team with the better regular season record; teams enjoying the home advantage are shown in italics.

First round	Conference semifinals
**E1**	**Chicago***	**3**
E8	New York	0
**E1**	**Chicago***	**4**
E5	Philadelphia	1
E4	Milwaukee	0
**E5**	**Philadelphia**	**3**
**Eastern Conference**
**E3**	**Detroit**	**3**
E6	Atlanta	2
**E3**	**Detroit**	**4**
E2	Boston*	2
**E2**	**Boston***	**3**
E7	Indiana	2
**W1**	**Portland***	**3**
W8	Seattle	2
**W1**	**Portland***	**4**
W5	Utah	1
W4	Phoenix	1
**W5**	**Utah**	**3**
**Western Conference**
**W3**	**LA Lakers**	**3**
W6	Houston	0
**W3**	**LA Lakers**	**4**
W7	Golden State	1
W2	San Antonio*	1
**W7**	**Golden State**	**3**

Conference finals
**E1**	**Chicago***	**4**
E3	Detroit	0
W1	Portland*	2
**W3**	**LA Lakers**	**4**

Finals
**E1**	**Chicago***	**4**
W3	LA Lakers	1

- * Division winner
- **Bold** Series winner
- Italic Team with home-court advantage

== Statistics leaders ==
Category	Player	Team	Stat
Points per game	Michael Jordan	Chicago Bulls	31.5
Rebounds per game	David Robinson	San Antonio Spurs	13.0
Assists per game	John Stockton	Utah Jazz	14.2
Steals per game	Alvin Robertson	Milwaukee Bucks	3.04
Blocks per game	Hakeem Olajuwon	Houston Rockets	3.95
FG%	Buck Williams	Portland Trail Blazers	.602
FT%	Reggie Miller	Indiana Pacers	.918
3FG%	Jim Les	Sacramento Kings	.461

== NBA awards ==
- Most Valuable Player: Michael Jordan, Chicago Bulls
- Rookie of the Year: Derrick Coleman, New Jersey Nets
- Defensive Player of the Year: Dennis Rodman, Detroit Pistons
- Sixth Man of the Year: Detlef Schrempf, Indiana Pacers
- Most Improved Player: Scott Skiles, Orlando Magic
- Coach of the Year: Don Chaney, Houston Rockets

- All-NBA First Team:
  - F – Karl Malone, Utah Jazz
  - F – Charles Barkley, Philadelphia 76ers
  - C – David Robinson, San Antonio Spurs
  - G – Michael Jordan, Chicago Bulls
  - G – Magic Johnson, Los Angeles Lakers
- All-NBA Second Team:
  - F – Dominique Wilkins, Atlanta Hawks
  - F – Chris Mullin, Golden State Warriors
  - C – Patrick Ewing, New York Knicks
  - G – Kevin Johnson, Phoenix Suns
  - G – Clyde Drexler, Portland Trail Blazers
- All-NBA Third Team:
  - F – James Worthy, Los Angeles Lakers
  - F – Bernard King, Washington Bullets
  - C – Hakeem Olajuwon, Houston Rockets
  - G – John Stockton, Utah Jazz
  - G – Joe Dumars, Detroit Pistons

- NBA All-Rookie First Team:
  - Dee Brown, Boston Celtics
  - Kendall Gill, Charlotte Hornets
  - Derrick Coleman, New Jersey Nets
  - Dennis Scott, Orlando Magic
  - Lionel Simmons, Sacramento Kings
- Second Team:
  - Chris Jackson, (Note: Entered the NBA as Chris Jackson before changing his name in 1993.) Denver Nuggets
  - Willie Burton, Miami Heat
  - Travis Mays, Sacramento Kings
  - Gary Payton, Seattle SuperSonics
  - Felton Spencer, Minnesota Timberwolves

- NBA All-Defensive First Team:
  - Michael Jordan, Chicago Bulls
  - Alvin Robertson, Milwaukee Bucks
  - David Robinson, San Antonio Spurs
  - Dennis Rodman, Detroit Pistons
  - Buck Williams, Portland Trail Blazers
- Second Team:
  - Joe Dumars, Detroit Pistons
  - John Stockton, Utah Jazz
  - Hakeem Olajuwon, Houston Rockets
  - Scottie Pippen, Chicago Bulls
  - Dan Majerle, Phoenix Suns

=== Player of the week ===
The following players were named NBA Player of the Week.

Week	Player
Nov. 2 – Nov. 11	Chris Mullin (Golden State Warriors)
Nov. 12 – Nov. 18	Clyde Drexler (Portland Trail Blazers)
Nov. 19 – Nov. 25	Charles Barkley (Philadelphia 76ers)
Nov. 26 – Dec. 2	Michael Jordan (Chicago Bulls)
Dec. 3 – Dec. 9	John Stockton (Utah Jazz)
Dec. 10 – Dec. 16	Kevin Johnson (Phoenix Suns)
Dec. 17 – Dec. 23	Michael Jordan (Chicago Bulls)
Dec. 25 – Dec. 29	Ricky Pierce (Milwaukee Bucks)
Dec. 30 – Jan. 6	Dominique Wilkins (Atlanta Hawks)
Jan. 7 – Jan. 13	Bernard King (Washington Bullets)
Jan. 14 – Jan. 20	Tim Hardaway (Golden State Warriors)
Jan. 21 – Jan. 27	Michael Adams (Denver Nuggets)
Jan. 28 – Feb. 3	Otis Thorpe (Houston Rockets)
Feb. 4 – Feb. 17	Lionel Simmons (Sacramento Kings)
Feb. 18 – Feb. 24	Reggie Miller (Indiana Pacers)
Feb. 25 – Mar. 3	Gerald Wilkins (New York Knicks)
Mar. 4 – Mar. 10	Dennis Scott (Orlando Magic)
Mar. 11 – Mar. 17	Kenny Smith (Houston Rockets)
Mar. 18 – Mar. 24	Mitch Richmond (Golden State Warriors)
Mar. 25 – Mar. 31	Clyde Drexler (Portland Trail Blazers)
Apr. 1 – Apr. 7	Magic Johnson (Los Angeles Lakers)
Apr. 8 – Apr. 14	Clyde Drexler (Portland Trail Blazers)
Apr. 15 – Apr. 21	Scott Skiles (Orlando Magic)

=== Player of the month ===
The following players were named NBA Player of the Month.

Month	Player
November	Chris Mullin (Golden State Warriors)
December	Karl Malone (Utah Jazz)
January	David Robinson (San Antonio Spurs)
February	Dominique Wilkins (Atlanta Hawks)
March	Michael Jordan (Chicago Bulls)
April	Michael Jordan (Chicago Bulls)

=== Rookie of the month ===
The following players were named NBA Rookie of the Month.

Month	Rookie
November	Derrick Coleman (New Jersey Nets)
December	Lionel Simmons (Sacramento Kings)
January	Derrick Coleman (New Jersey Nets)
February	Lionel Simmons (Sacramento Kings)
March	Dennis Scott (Orlando Magic)
April	Derrick Coleman (New Jersey Nets)

=== Coach of the month ===
The following coaches were named NBA Coach of the Month.

Month	Coach
November	Rick Adelman (Portland Trail Blazers)
December	Bob Weiss (Atlanta Hawks)
January	Mike Dunleavy (Los Angeles Lakers)
February	Don Chaney (Houston Rockets)
March	Don Chaney (Houston Rockets)
April	Rick Adelman (Portland Trail Blazers)

== See also ==
- List of NBA regular season records
