= 1994 NBA playoffs =

Postseason tournament

Tournament details
- Dates: April 28–June 22, 1994
- Season: 1993–94
- Teams: 16

Final positions
- Champions: Houston Rockets (1st title)
- Runners-up: New York Knicks
- Semifinalists: Indiana Pacers; Utah Jazz

Tournament statistics
- Scoring leader(s): Hakeem Olajuwon (Rockets) (28.9 PPG)

Awards
- MVP: Hakeem Olajuwon (Rockets)

The 1994 NBA playoffs was the postseason tournament of the National Basketball Association's 1993-94 season. The tournament concluded with the Western Conference champion Houston Rockets defeating the Eastern Conference champion New York Knicks 4 games to 3 in the NBA Finals. Hakeem Olajuwon was named NBA Finals MVP.

This was also the first time that the Boston Celtics (since 1979) and Los Angeles Lakers (since 1976) missed the playoffs. It was their first absence from the playoffs since the playoff field expanded to 16 teams in 1984. It was also the first time that both missed the playoffs in the same year. This would not occur again until 2014. It also marked the first time both of the two Los Angeles-based NBA teams, the Lakers and Clippers (who arrived in L.A. in 1984), missed the playoffs together. Had either team made the postseason, it would have been likely that a home playoff game would have been moved to the Thomas and Mack Center in Las Vegas due to the death of Richard Nixon, which occurred on April 22, 1994.

The biggest upset came in the first round, when the Denver Nuggets came back from a 2–0 deficit to beat the Seattle SuperSonics in five games, marking the first time in NBA history that an eighth seed had defeated a #1 seed. Denver stretched their improbable playoff run with the Utah Jazz to seven games after being down 3–0, but Utah defeated them in Game 7 91–81.

The playoffs also featured the first playoff series victory for the Indiana Pacers in their 18-year NBA existence, as they swept the Orlando Magic (who were making their first playoff appearance in franchise history) in the first round, then eliminated the top-seeded Atlanta Hawks 4–2 in the second round. The Pacers advanced within one game of the NBA Finals, but lost Games 6 and 7 of the Eastern Conference finals to the Knicks.

This was the first time since the ABA–NBA merger prior to the 1976–77 season that all former ABA teams (Pacers, Nuggets, Spurs, and Nets) made the playoffs in the same year.

The Chicago Bulls, who made the playoffs despite the retirement of Michael Jordan, swept the Cleveland Cavaliers in the first round, but then lost in seven games to the Knicks in the Eastern Conference Semifinals. This was also the fourth consecutive season the Bulls and Knicks met in the NBA playoffs with the Bulls winning all three prior series. They would meet again in the 1996 NBA Playoffs with the Bulls winning in five games.

The Knicks made history by playing a record 25 playoff games (one short of the maximum), the most postseason games an NBA team has played. The 2004–05 Detroit Pistons tied this record by playing 25 games, though their run ended with a seven-game loss to the San Antonio Spurs in the NBA Finals. The mark was later surpassed by the 2007–08 Celtics, who played a record 26 games en route to winning the NBA Finals. The Knicks' easiest series was the first-round 3–1 win over the Nets. New York then forced three consecutive game sevens, eliminating the Bulls 4–3 in the Conference Semifinals, knocking off the Pacers 4–3 in the conference finals, both times at Madison Square Garden, before losing in game seven to the Rockets at The Summit in the NBA Finals. Game four of the NBA Finals took place at the Garden a day after the New York Rangers won their first Stanley Cup in 54 years in game seven of the 1994 Stanley Cup Final. Knicks coach Pat Riley made history by becoming the first (and to this date, the only) person in NBA history to have coached a game seven in the NBA Finals for two teams, having been with the Lakers in 1984 and 1988.

In the Western Conference, the Golden State Warriors made their last playoff appearance until 2007. Game 3 of the Suns–Warriors series would be the last playoff game to take place inside the original bowl of the Oakland Coliseum Arena; the building was heavily renovated with increased seating capacity throughout the 1996–97 season, during which the Warriors moved to San Jose Arena, home of the NHL's San Jose Sharks. The arena was reopened the following season.

Game 3 of the Bulls-Cavaliers series was the last game played at the Richfield Coliseum.

Game 6 of the Bulls-Knicks series was the last game played at Chicago Stadium.

Game 5 of the Nuggets-Sonics series was the last to be played at Seattle Center Coliseum before its first renovation and eventual rechristening as KeyArena in 1995. During the renovations, the Sonics played the intervening 1994–95 NBA season at Tacoma Dome in nearby Tacoma, Washington; the arena had also been used intermittently by them during the early 1990s. After the SuperSonics relocated to and rebranded as the Oklahoma City Thunder in 2008, the building (which is still being used by the Sonics' former WNBA sister team Seattle Storm) later received a second renovation project to accommodate the NHL's Seattle Kraken. This third iteration of the Coliseum became Climate Pledge Arena and was reopened in 2021.

During Game 5 of the 1994 NBA Finals, NFL Hall of Famer O. J. Simpson began a slow speed freeway chase with the Los Angeles Police Department while being sought for arrest in connection with the murder of Nicole Brown Simpson and Ron Goldman. The chase attracted intense media coverage, and most NBC affiliates split the coverage of the game with the chase. At the time, Simpson was an NFL analyst on NBC.

This would be last time when neither conference's number one seed reached the conference finals until 2021.

== Clock incident ==
The clock incident happened in the last moments of game 4 of the Western Conference finals between the Rockets and Jazz. Tom Chambers inbounded the ball to Jeff Hornacek with 13.5 seconds left and Utah down 2. As play resumed, the Jazz timekeeper did not start the clock as they were trying to look for an open shot. After 8 seconds, the clock finally started as Chambers got the ball down low but Utah did not take advantage of the extra time they were given, and after Chambers attempted a shot and missed, there was a mad scramble for the ball. It ended up in Robert Horry's hands, who passed it to Kenny Smith; Houston ran out the clock to win 80–78.

== Bracket ==
First round
E1	Atlanta*	3
E8	Miami	2
E4	Orlando	0
E5	Indiana	3
E3	Chicago	3
E6	Cleveland	0
E2	New York*	3
E7	New Jersey	1
W1	Seattle*	2
W8	Denver	3
W4	San Antonio	1
W5	Utah	3
W3	Phoenix	3
W6	Golden State	0
W2	Houston*	3
W7	Portland	1

Quarter-finals
E1	Atlanta*	2
E5	Indiana	4
E3	Chicago	3
E2	New York*	4
W8	Denver	3
W5	Utah	4
W3	Phoenix	3
W2	Houston*	4

Semi-finals
E5	Indiana	3
E2	New York*	4
W5	Utah	1
W2	Houston*	4

Final
E2	New York*	3
W2	Houston*	4

- * Division winner
- Bold Series winner
- Italic Team with home-court advantage

== First round ==
=== Eastern Conference first round ===
==== (1) Atlanta Hawks vs. (8) Miami Heat ====
TBS

April 28
7:00 PM

Boxscore

Miami Heat 93, Atlanta Hawks 88
Scoring by quarter: 22–31, 24–15, 19–23, 28–19
Pts: Steve Smith 22; Rebs: Glen Rice 10; Asts: Bimbo Coles 5	Pts: Kevin Willis 17; Rebs: Kevin Willis 16; Asts: Mookie Blaylock 9
Miami leads series, 1–0

Omni Coliseum, Atlanta, Georgia
Attendance: 11,543
Referees: Dick Bavetta, Steve Javie, Ron Olesiak

TNT

April 30
8:00 PM

Boxscore

Miami Heat 86, Atlanta Hawks 104
Scoring by quarter: 18–29, 30–27, 23–26, 15–22
Pts: Steve Smith 24; Rebs: Steve Smith 9 Asts: four players 2 each	Pts: Danny Manning 20; Rebs: Kevin Willis 14; Asts: Mookie Blaylock 8
Series tied, 1–1

Omni Coliseum, Atlanta, Georgia
Attendance: 16,368
Referees: Ron Garretson, David Jones, Ed T. Rush

TBS

May 3
7:00 PM

Boxscore

Atlanta Hawks 86, Miami Heat 90
Scoring by quarter: 18–26, 28–21, 16–19, 24–24
Pts: Craig Ehlo 20; Rebs: Kevin Willis 13; Asts: Danny Manning 8	Pts: Steve Smith 25; Rebs: Rony Seikaly 20; Asts: Brian Shaw 4
Miami leads series, 2–1

Miami Arena, Miami, Florida
Attendance: 15,200
Referees: Nolan Fine, Darell Garretson, Jack Nies

TNT

May 5
6:00 PM

Boxscore

Atlanta Hawks 103, Miami Heat 89
Scoring by quarter: 22–19, 33–25, 19–19, 29–26
Pts: Mookie Blaylock 29; Rebs: Kevin Willis 14; Asts: Mookie Blaylock 7	Pts: Bimbo Coles 18; Rebs: Rony Seikaly 8 Asts: Bimbo Coles 7
Series tied, 2–2

Miami Arena, Miami, Florida
Attendance: 15,200
Referees: Hugh Evans, Paul Mihalak, Ronnie Nunn

NBC

May 8
12:30 PM

Boxscore

Miami Heat 91, Atlanta Hawks 102
Scoring by quarter: 27–28, 17–26, 19–22, 28–26
Pts: Grant Long 22; Rebs: Grant Long 10; Asts: Rony Seikaly 4	Pts: Kevin Willis 24; Rebs: Kevin Willis 12; Asts: Mookie Blaylock 18
Atlanta wins series, 3–2

Omni Coliseum, Atlanta, Georgia
Attendance: 14,472
Referees: Mike Mathis, Bill Oakes, Jake O'Donnell

Regular-season series
Atlanta won 3–1 in the regular-season series

November 19, 1993

Recap

Atlanta Hawks 95, Miami Heat 92

Miami Arena, Miami

February 10, 1994

Recap

Miami Heat 98, Atlanta Hawks 114

The Omni, Atlanta

March 26, 1994

Recap

Miami Heat 90, Atlanta Hawks 100

The Omni, Atlanta

April 21, 1994

Recap

Atlanta Hawks 89, Miami Heat 94

Miami Arena, Miami

This was the first playoff meeting between the Hawks and the Heat.

==== (2) New York Knicks vs. (7) New Jersey Nets ====
TBS

April 29
7:00 PM

Boxscore

New Jersey Nets 80, New York Knicks 91
Scoring by quarter: 13–19, 20–16, 28–28, 19–28
Pts: Derrick Coleman 27; Rebs: Derrick Coleman 10; Asts: Kenny Anderson 6	Pts: Patrick Ewing 25; Rebs: Patrick Ewing 13; Asts: Patrick Ewing 5
New York leads series, 1–0

Madison Square Garden, New York City, New York
Attendance: 19,763
Referees: Ed Middleton, Bill Oakes, Jake O'Donnell

NBC

May 1
12:30 PM

Boxscore

New Jersey Nets 81, New York Knicks 90
Scoring by quarter: 20–26, 13–29, 31–15, 17–20
Pts: Kenny Anderson 21; Rebs: Derrick Coleman 21; Asts: four players 3 each	Pts: Charles Oakley 25; Rebs: Charles Oakley 24; Asts: Derek Harper 8
New York leads series, 2–0

Madison Square Garden, New York City, New York
Attendance: 19,763
Referees: Mike Mathis, Paul Mihalak, Tommy Nunez Sr.

TNT

May 4
8:00 PM

Boxscore

New York Knicks 92, New Jersey Nets 93 (OT)
Scoring by quarter: 22–32, 20–21, 21–21, 20–9, Overtime: 9–10
Pts: Patrick Ewing 27; Rebs: Charles Oakley 16; Asts: Harper, Davis 4 each	Pts: Derrick Coleman 25; Rebs: Derrick Coleman 17; Asts: Kenny Anderson 11
New York leads series, 2–1

Brendan Byrne Arena, East Rutherford, New Jersey
Attendance: 20,049
Referees: Joe Crawford, Hue Hollins, Don Vaden

TNT

May 6
8:00 PM

Boxscore

New York Knicks 102, New Jersey Nets 92
Scoring by quarter: 24–18, 21–20, 27–23, 30–31
Pts: Patrick Ewing 36; Rebs: Patrick Ewing 14; Asts: Oakley, Starks 4 each	Pts: Derrick Coleman 31; Rebs: Derrick Coleman 9 Asts: Kenny Anderson 7
New York wins series, 3–1

Brendan Byrne Arena, East Rutherford, New Jersey
Attendance: 20,049
Referees: Jim Clark, Darell Garretson, Steve Javie

Regular-season series
New Jersey won 4–1 in the regular-season series

December 21, 1993

Recap

New York Knicks 81, New Jersey Nets 85

Meadowlands Arena, East Rutherford, New Jersey

December 28, 1993

Recap

New Jersey Nets 97, New York Knicks 95

Madison Square Garden, New York City

February 15, 1994

Recap

New York Knicks 83, New Jersey Nets 103

Meadowlands Arena, East Rutherford, New Jersey

March 3, 1994

Recap

New Jersey Nets 86, New York Knicks 97

Madison Square Garden, New York City

April 10, 1994

Recap

New York Knicks 88, New Jersey Nets 107

Meadowlands Arena, East Rutherford, New Jersey

This was the second playoff meeting between these two teams, with the Knicks winning the first meeting.

Previous playoff series
New York leads 1–0 in all-time playoff series

1983

New Jersey Nets 0, New York Knicks 2

1983 Eastern Conference First Round

==== (3) Chicago Bulls vs. (6) Cleveland Cavaliers ====
TNT

April 29
8:00 PM

Boxscore

Cleveland Cavaliers 96, Chicago Bulls 104
Scoring by quarter: 22–21, 29–28, 20–27, 25–28
Pts: Gerald Wilkins 23; Rebs: Tyrone Hill 8 Asts: Mark Price 5	Pts: Scottie Pippen 31; Rebs: Scottie Pippen 12; Asts: Peter Myers 6
Chicago leads series, 1–0

Chicago Stadium, Chicago, Illinois
Attendance: 18,676
Referees: Nolan Fine, Joe Forte, Mike Mathis

NBC

May 1
3:00 PM

Boxscore

Cleveland Cavaliers 96, Chicago Bulls 105
Scoring by quarter: 23–31, 27–24, 25–23, 21–27
Pts: Gerald Wilkins 28; Rebs: Tyrone Hill 10; Asts: Price, Phills 4 each	Pts: Scottie Pippen 22; Rebs: Horace Grant 12; Asts: Toni Kukoč 11
Chicago leads series, 2–0

Chicago Stadium, Chicago, Illinois
Attendance: 18,676
Referees: Ed Middleton, Jack Nies, Jake O'Donnell

(Note: Not televised nationally. Game was televised regionally in the Chicago and Cleveland markets due to TBS airing an Atlanta Braves game.)

May 3
8:00 PM

Boxscore

Chicago Bulls 95, Cleveland Cavaliers 92 (OT)
Scoring by quarter: 25–28, 19–20, 27–27, 16–12, Overtime: 8–5
Pts: Scottie Pippen 23; Rebs: Scottie Pippen 11; Asts: Scottie Pippen 6	Pts: Chris Mills 25; Rebs: Tyrone Hill 13; Asts: Gerald Wilkins 7
Chicago wins series, 3–0

Richfield Coliseum, Richfield, Ohio
Attendance: 17,778
Referees: Hue Hollins, Jess Kersey, Ronnie Nunn

- Final Cavaliers game at Richfield Coliseum.

Regular-season series
Cleveland won 3–1 in the regular-season series

December 11, 1993

Recap

Cleveland Cavaliers 84, Chicago Bulls 93

Chicago Stadium, Chicago, Illinois

January 27, 1994

Recap

Chicago Bulls 84, Cleveland Cavaliers 100

The Coliseum, Richfield, Ohio

February 28, 1994

Recap

Cleveland Cavaliers 89, Chicago Bulls 81

Chicago Stadium, Chicago, Illinois

March 6, 1994

Recap

Chicago Bulls 95, Cleveland Cavaliers 99

The Coliseum, Richfield, Ohio

This was the fifth playoff meeting between these two teams, with the Bulls winning the first four meetings.

Previous playoff series
Chicago leads 4–0 in all-time playoff series

1988

Chicago Bulls 3, Cleveland Cavaliers 2

1988 Eastern Conference First Round

1989

Chicago Bulls 3, Cleveland Cavaliers 2

1989 Eastern Conference First Round

1992

Chicago Bulls 4, Cleveland Cavaliers 2

1992 Eastern Conference Finals

1993

Chicago Bulls 4, Cleveland Cavaliers 0

1993 Eastern Conference Semifinals

==== (4) Orlando Magic vs. (5) Indiana Pacers ====
TNT

April 28
8:00 PM

Boxscore

Indiana Pacers 89, Orlando Magic 88
Scoring by quarter: 20–26, 22–28, 24–20, 23–14
Pts: Reggie Miller 24; Rebs: McKey, D. Davis 10 each Asts: Haywoode Workman 11	Pts: Shaquille O'Neal 24; Rebs: Shaquille O'Neal 19; Asts: Penny Hardaway 10
Indiana leads series, 1–0

Orlando Arena, Orlando, Florida
Attendance: 15,291
Referees: Dan Crawford, Jess Kersey, Eddie F. Rush

- Byron Scott hits the game-winning 3 with 2 seconds left.

NBC

April 30
1:00 PM

Boxscore

Indiana Pacers 103, Orlando Magic 101
Scoring by quarter: 28–21, 23–34, 29–18, 23–28
Pts: Reggie Miller 32; Rebs: Dale Davis 9 Asts: Haywoode Workman 10	Pts: Penny Hardaway 31; Rebs: three players 7 each Asts: Penny Hardaway 7
Indiana leads series, 2–0

Orlando Arena, Orlando, Florida
Attendance: 15,291
Referees: Dick Bavetta, Jim Clark, Steve Javie

TNT

May 2
8:00 PM

Boxscore

Orlando Magic 86, Indiana Pacers 99
Scoring by quarter: 25–28, 27–18, 20–22, 14–31
Pts: Shaquille O'Neal 23; Rebs: Shaquille O'Neal 14; Asts: Penny Hardaway 4	Pts: Reggie Miller 31; Rebs: Dale Davis 14; Asts: Derrick McKey 6
Indiana wins series, 3–0

Market Square Arena, Indianapolis, Indiana
Attendance: 16,562
Referees: Ron Garretson, Tommy Nunez Sr., Ed T. Rush

Regular-season series
Tied 2–2 in the regular-season series

November 9, 1993

Recap

Indiana Pacers 98, Orlando Magic 104

Orlando Arena, Orlando, Florida

December 9, 1993

Recap

Orlando Magic 105, Indiana Pacers 111

Market Square Arena, Indianapolis

February 23, 1994

Recap

Indiana Pacers 99, Orlando Magic 103

Orlando Arena, Orlando, Florida

April 2, 1994

Recap

Orlando Magic 113, Indiana Pacers 128

Market Square Arena, Indianapolis

This was the first playoff meeting between the Pacers and the Magic.

=== Western Conference first round ===
==== (1) Seattle SuperSonics vs. (8) Denver Nuggets ====
TNT

April 28
10:30 PM

Boxscore

Denver Nuggets 82, Seattle SuperSonics 106
Scoring by quarter: 19–30, 18–32, 21–23, 24–21
Pts: Bison Dele 15; Rebs: Dikembe Mutombo 9 Asts: Robert Pack 4	Pts: Detlef Schrempf 21; Rebs: Kemp, Perkins 9 each Asts: Gary Payton 7
Seattle leads series, 1–0

Seattle Center Coliseum, Seattle, Washington
Attendance: 14,813
Referees: Hue Hollins, Ed T. Rush, Greg Willard

TNT

April 30
10:30 PM

Boxscore

Denver Nuggets 87, Seattle SuperSonics 97
Scoring by quarter: 19–27, 18–23, 25–22, 25–25
Pts: LaPhonso Ellis 18; Rebs: Ellis, Dele 10 each Asts: Dikembe Mutombo 5	Pts: Gary Payton 18; Rebs: Shawn Kemp 12; Asts: Shawn Kemp 6
Seattle leads series, 2–0

Seattle Center Coliseum, Seattle, Washington
Attendance: 14,813
Referees: Dan Crawford, Bennett Salvatore, Bill Spooner

TNT

May 2
10:30 PM

Boxscore

Seattle SuperSonics 93, Denver Nuggets 110
Scoring by quarter: 26–41, 26–20, 21–23, 20–26
Pts: Detlef Schrempf 18; Rebs: Detlef Schrempf 6 Asts: Gary Payton 5	Pts: Reggie Williams 31; Rebs: Dikembe Mutombo 13; Asts: Reggie Williams 8
Seattle leads series, 2–1

McNichols Sports Arena, Denver, Colorado
Attendance: 17,171
Referees: Bob Delaney, Hugh Evans, Bill Oakes

(Note: Not televised nationally. Game was televised regionally in the Seattle and Denver markets.)

May 5
8:30 PM

Boxscore

Seattle SuperSonics 85, Denver Nuggets 94 (OT)
Scoring by quarter: 17–13, 22–27, 24–18, 19–24, Overtime: 3–12
Pts: Payton, Schrempf 20 each Rebs: Shawn Kemp 13; Asts: Vincent Askew 5	Pts: LaPhonso Ellis 27; Rebs: LaPhonso Ellis 17; Asts: Reggie Williams 6
Series tied, 2–2

McNichols Sports Arena, Denver, Colorado
Attendance: 17,171
Referees: Jack Madden, Jake O'Donnell, Eddie F. Rush

NBC

May 7
3:30 PM

Boxscore

Denver Nuggets 98, Seattle SuperSonics 94 (OT)
Scoring by quarter: 19–20, 22–24, 19–18, 28–26, Overtime: 10–6
Pts: Robert Pack 23; Rebs: Bison Dele 19; Asts: Reggie Williams 5	Pts: Kendall Gill 22; Rebs: Shawn Kemp 12; Asts: Gary Payton 8
Denver wins series, 3–2

Seattle Center Coliseum, Seattle, Washington
Attendance: 14,813
Referees: Dick Bavetta, Jess Kersey, Jack Nies

- Denver becomes the first 8th seed to beat the 1st seed in playoff history.

Regular-season series
Tied 2–2 in the regular-season series

November 9, 1993

Recap

Denver Nuggets 86, Seattle SuperSonics 118

Seattle Center Coliseum, Seattle

January 22, 1994

Recap

Seattle SuperSonics 91, Denver Nuggets 98

McNichols Sports Arena, Denver, Colorado

March 28, 1994

Recap

Denver Nuggets 97, Seattle SuperSonics 111

Seattle Center Coliseum, Seattle

April 7, 1994

Recap

Seattle SuperSonics 90, Denver Nuggets 104

McNichols Sports Arena, Denver, Colorado

This was the third playoff meeting between these two teams, with each team winning one series apiece.

Previous playoff series
Tied 1–1 in all-time playoff series

1978

Denver Nuggets 2, Seattle SuperSonics 4

1978 Western Conference Finals

1988

Denver Nuggets 3, Seattle SuperSonics 2

1988 Western Conference First Round

==== (2) Houston Rockets vs. (7) Portland Trail Blazers ====
TBS

April 29
9:30 PM

Boxscore

Portland Trail Blazers 104, Houston Rockets 114
Scoring by quarter: 23–39, 32–25, 30–26, 19–24
Pts: Clyde Drexler 26; Rebs: Clyde Drexler 13; Asts: Clyde Drexler 6	Pts: Hakeem Olajuwon 26; Rebs: Otis Thorpe 12; Asts: Maxwell, Smith 7 each
Houston leads series, 1–0

The Summit, Houston, Texas
Attendance: 16,333
Referees: Hugh Evans, Lee Jones, Paul Mihalak

TNT

May 1
8:00 PM

Boxscore

Portland Trail Blazers 104, Houston Rockets 115
Scoring by quarter: 24–29, 23–28, 31–31, 26–27
Pts: Clifford Robinson 28; Rebs: Clyde Drexler 9 Asts: Rod Strickland 12	Pts: Hakeem Olajuwon 46; Rebs: Otis Thorpe 12; Asts: Sam Cassell 9
Houston leads series, 2–0

The Summit, Houston, Texas
Attendance: 16,355
Referees: Joe Forte, Darell Garretson, Ken Mauer

- Hakeem's big block on Rod Strickland's layup.

TBS

May 3
9:30 PM

Boxscore

Houston Rockets 115, Portland Trail Blazers 118
Scoring by quarter: 30–30, 30–32, 30–24, 25–32
Pts: Hakeem Olajuwon 36; Rebs: Otis Thorpe 11; Asts: Olajuwon, Horry 6 each	Pts: Rod Strickland 25; Rebs: Robinson, Williams 10 each Asts: Rod Strickland 15
Houston leads series, 2–1

Memorial Coliseum, Portland, Oregon
Attendance: 12,888
Referees: Dick Bavetta, Jim Clark, Dan Crawford

TNT

May 6
10:30 PM

Boxscore

Houston Rockets 92, Portland Trail Blazers 89
Scoring by quarter: 27–13, 24–23, 17–26, 24–27
Pts: Hakeem Olajuwon 28; Rebs: Hakeem Olajuwon 16; Asts: three players 3 each	Pts: Rod Strickland 26; Rebs: Clyde Drexler 13; Asts: Rod Strickland 7
Houston wins series, 3–1

Memorial Coliseum, Portland, Oregon
Attendance: 12,888
Referees: Ron Garretson, Mike Mathis, Bill Oakes

Regular-season series
Houston won 4–0 in the regular-season series

November 7, 1993

Recap

Houston Rockets 106, Portland Trail Blazers 92

Memorial Coliseum, Portland, Oregon

January 4, 1994

Recap

Portland Trail Blazers 95, Houston Rockets 106

The Summit, Houston

March 15, 1994

Recap

Portland Trail Blazers 99, Houston Rockets 105

The Summit, Houston

April 17, 1994

Recap

Houston Rockets 119, Portland Trail Blazers 110

Memorial Coliseum, Portland, Oregon

This was the second playoff meeting between these two teams, with the Rockets winning the first meeting.

Previous playoff series
Houston leads 1–0 in all-time playoff series

1987

Houston Rockets 3, Portland Trail Blazers 1

1987 Western Conference First Round

==== (3) Phoenix Suns vs. (6) Golden State Warriors ====
TNT

April 29
10:30 PM

Boxscore

Golden State Warriors 104, Phoenix Suns 111
Scoring by quarter: 23–38, 27–26, 30–28, 24–19
Pts: Billy Owens 27; Rebs: Billy Owens 17; Asts: Latrell Sprewell 10	Pts: Charles Barkley 36; Rebs: Charles Barkley 19; Asts: Barkley, Johnson 7 each
Phoenix leads series, 1–0

America West Arena, Phoenix, Arizona
Attendance: 19,023
Referees: Joe Crawford, Terry Durham, Bennett Salvatore

NBC

May 1
5:30 PM

Boxscore

Golden State Warriors 111, Phoenix Suns 117
Scoring by quarter: 25–20, 31–33, 30–38, 25–26
Pts: Chris Mullin 32; Rebs: Chris Webber 10; Asts: Chris Webber 9	Pts: Kevin Johnson 38; Rebs: A.C. Green 10; Asts: Kevin Johnson 9
Phoenix leads series, 2–0

America West Arena, Phoenix, Arizona
Attendance: 19,023
Referees: Hugh Evans, Lee Jones, Jack Madden

TNT

May 4
10:30 PM

Boxscore

Phoenix Suns 140, Golden State Warriors 133
Scoring by quarter: 42–42, 32–31, 32–34, 34–26
Pts: Charles Barkley 56; Rebs: Charles Barkley 14; Asts: Kevin Johnson 12	Pts: Chris Mullin 30; Rebs: Webber, Gatling 8 each Asts: Chris Webber 13
Phoenix wins series, 3–0

Oakland–Alameda County Coliseum Arena, Oakland, California
Attendance: 15,025
Referees: Mike Mathis, Bill Oakes, Greg Willard

Regular-season series
Phoenix won 3–2 in the regular-season series

November 16, 1993

Recap

Phoenix Suns 116, Golden State Warriors 104

Oakland–Alameda County Coliseum Arena, Oakland, California

December 15, 1993

Recap

Golden State Warriors 104, Phoenix Suns 110

America West Arena, Phoenix, Arizona

January 9, 1994

Recap

Golden State Warriors 107, Phoenix Suns 122

America West Arena, Phoenix, Arizona

January 17, 1994

Recap

Phoenix Suns 99, Golden State Warriors 104

Oakland–Alameda County Coliseum Arena, Oakland, California

March 3, 1994

Recap

Phoenix Suns 107, Golden State Warriors 120

Oakland–Alameda County Coliseum Arena, Oakland, California

This was the third playoff meeting between these two teams, with the Suns winning the first two meetings.

Previous playoff series
Phoenix leads 2–0 in all-time playoff series

1976

Golden State Warriors 3, Phoenix Suns 4

1976 Western Conference Finals

1989

Golden State Warriors 1, Phoenix Suns 4

1989 Western Conference Semifinals

==== (4) San Antonio Spurs vs. (5) Utah Jazz ====
TBS

April 28
9:30 PM

Boxscore

Utah Jazz 89, San Antonio Spurs 106
Scoring by quarter: 25–30, 17–25, 18–27, 29–24
Pts: Karl Malone 36; Rebs: Karl Malone 10; Asts: John Stockton 8	Pts: David Robinson 25; Rebs: Dennis Rodman 11; Asts: David Robinson 7
San Antonio leads series, 1–0

Alamodome, San Antonio, Texas
Attendance: 18,257
Referees: Darell Garretson, Ronnie Nunn, Don Vaden

NBC

April 30
3:30 PM

Boxscore

Utah Jazz 96, San Antonio Spurs 84
Scoring by quarter: 20–24, 30–9, 25–16, 21–35
Pts: Karl Malone 23; Rebs: Karl Malone 14; Asts: John Stockton 5	Pts: Negele Knight 16; Rebs: Dennis Rodman 17; Asts: Vinny Del Negro 5
Series tied, 1–1

Alamodome, San Antonio, Texas
Attendance: 20,640
Referees: Bob Delaney, Jess Kersey, Eddie F. Rush

TNT

May 3
10:30 PM

Boxscore

San Antonio Spurs 72, Utah Jazz 105
Scoring by quarter: 15–22, 17–24, 16–32, 24–27
Pts: Robinson, Carr 16 each Rebs: Robinson, Cummings 11 each Asts: Del Negro, Knight 4 each	Pts: Karl Malone 24; Rebs: Karl Malone 13; Asts: John Stockton 12
Utah leads series, 2–1

Delta Center, Salt Lake City, Utah
Attendance: 19,911
Referees: Terry Durham, Jack Madden, Jake O'Donnell

TNT

May 5
11:00 PM

Boxscore

San Antonio Spurs 90, Utah Jazz 95
Scoring by quarter: 26–26, 20–20, 18–20, 26–29
Pts: David Robinson 27; Rebs: Dennis Rodman 20; Asts: Willie Anderson 7	Pts: Karl Malone 34; Rebs: Karl Malone 12; Asts: John Stockton 18
Utah wins series, 3–1

Delta Center, Salt Lake City, Utah
Attendance: 19,911
Referees: Dick Bavetta, Dan Crawford, Joe Forte

Regular-season series
Utah won 5–0 in the regular-season series

December 13, 1993

Recap

San Antonio Spurs 87, Utah Jazz 102

Delta Center, Salt Lake City

December 23, 1993

Recap

Utah Jazz 96, San Antonio Spurs 88

Alamodome, San Antonio

February 23, 1994

Recap

San Antonio Spurs 102, Utah Jazz 106 (OT)

Delta Center, Salt Lake City

March 2, 1994

Recap

Utah Jazz 106, San Antonio Spurs 96

Alamodome, San Antonio

April 14, 1994

Recap

San Antonio Spurs 90, Utah Jazz 101

Delta Center, Salt Lake City

This was the first playoff meeting between the Spurs and the Jazz.

== Conference semifinals ==
=== Eastern Conference semifinals ===
==== (1) Atlanta Hawks vs. (5) Indiana Pacers ====
TNT

May 10
8:00 PM

Boxscore

Indiana Pacers 96, Atlanta Hawks 85
Scoring by quarter: 25–31, 22–22, 32–19, 17–13
Pts: Reggie Miller 18; Rebs: Dale Davis 15; Asts: Haywoode Workman 8	Pts: Danny Manning 21; Rebs: Kevin Willis 10; Asts: Mookie Blaylock 8
Indiana leads series, 1–0

Omni Coliseum, Atlanta, Georgia
Attendance: 13,190
Referees: Darell Garretson, Hue Hollins, Lee Jones

TNT

May 12
8:00 PM

Boxscore

Indiana Pacers 69, Atlanta Hawks 92
Scoring by quarter: 19–24, 13–23, 25–18, 12–27
Pts: Reggie Miller 12; Rebs: Dale Davis 18; Asts: Workman, Miller 5 each	Pts: Manning, Willis 20 each Rebs: Kevin Willis 15; Asts: Mookie Blaylock 13
Series tied, 1–1

Omni Coliseum, Atlanta, Georgia
Attendance: 15,854
Referees: Joe Crawford, Jack Nies, Eddie F. Rush

NBC

May 14
1:00 PM

Boxscore

Atlanta Hawks 81, Indiana Pacers 101
Scoring by quarter: 22–26, 20–27, 17–23, 22–25
Pts: Kevin Willis 14; Rebs: Willis, Manning 10 each Asts: Mookie Blaylock 7	Pts: Rik Smits 27; Rebs: Byron Scott 8 Asts: Haywoode Workman 7
Indiana leads series, 2–1

Market Square Arena, Indianapolis, Indiana
Attendance: 16,545
Referees: Dan Crawford, Hugh Evans, Joe Forte

NBC

May 15
12:30 PM

Boxscore

Atlanta Hawks 86, Indiana Pacers 102
Scoring by quarter: 26–22, 22–33, 24–23, 14–24
Pts: Danny Manning 35; Rebs: Andrew Lang 8 Asts: Blaylock, Ehlo 5 each	Pts: Reggie Miller 25; Rebs: Smits, McKey 8 each Asts: Haywoode Workman 8
Indiana leads series, 3–1

Market Square Arena, Indianapolis, Indiana
Attendance: 16,561
Referees: Bob Delaney, Jack Madden, Mike Mathis

TNT

May 17
6:30 PM

Boxscore

Indiana Pacers 76, Atlanta Hawks 88
Scoring by quarter: 19–22, 22–25, 20–18, 15–23
Pts: Reggie Miller 22; Rebs: Derrick McKey 13; Asts: Haywoode Workman 9	Pts: Craig Ehlo 22; Rebs: Mookie Blaylock 10; Asts: Mookie Blaylock 13
Indiana leads series, 3–2

Omni Coliseum, Atlanta, Georgia
Attendance: 14,849
Referees: Ron Garretson, Steve Javie, Ed T. Rush

TNT

May 19
6:30 PM

Boxscore

Atlanta Hawks 79, Indiana Pacers 98
Scoring by quarter: 23–24, 12–14, 16–34, 28–26
Pts: Mookie Blaylock 23; Rebs: Danny Manning 10; Asts: three players 4 each	Pts: Rik Smits 27; Rebs: three players 10 each Asts: Haywoode Workman 10
Indiana wins series, 4–2

Market Square Arena, Indianapolis, Indiana
Referees: Jess Kersey, Jake O'Donnell, Bennett Salvatore

Regular-season series
Atlanta won 3–2 in the regular-season series

November 5, 1993

Recap

Indiana Pacers 110, Atlanta Hawks 116

The Omni, Atlanta

December 16, 1993

Recap

Indiana Pacers 99, Atlanta Hawks 81

The Omni, Atlanta

January 15, 1994

Recap

Atlanta Hawks 91, Indiana Pacers 94

Market Square Arena, Indianapolis

March 5, 1994

Recap

Indiana Pacers 88, Atlanta Hawks 90

The Omni, Atlanta

March 18, 1994

Recap

Atlanta Hawks 81, Indiana Pacers 78

Market Square Arena, Indianapolis

This was the second playoff meeting between these two teams, with the Hawks winning the first meeting.

Previous playoff series
Atlanta leads 1–0 in all-time playoff series

1987

Atlanta Hawks 3, Indiana Pacers 1

1987 Eastern Conference First Round

==== (2) New York Knicks vs. (3) Chicago Bulls ====
NBC

May 8
5:30 PM

Boxscore

Chicago Bulls 86, New York Knicks 90
Scoring by quarter: 25–19, 27–23, 19–20, 15–28
Pts: Scottie Pippen 24; Rebs: Luc Longley 8 Asts: Scottie Pippen 7	Pts: Patrick Ewing 18; Rebs: Patrick Ewing 12; Asts: five players 3 each
New York leads series, 1–0

Madison Square Garden, New York City, New York
Attendance: 19,763
Referees: Jack Madden, Ed Middleton, Ed T. Rush

TNT

May 11
8:00 PM

Boxscore

Chicago Bulls 91, New York Knicks 96
Scoring by quarter: 27–23, 24–24, 21–22, 19–27
Pts: Grant, Armstrong 23 each Rebs: Bill Cartwright 10; Asts: B. J. Armstrong 6	Pts: Patrick Ewing 26; Rebs: Anthony Mason 14; Asts: Anthony Mason 6
New York leads series, 2–0

Madison Square Garden, New York City, New York
Attendance: 19,763
Referees: Joe Forte, Jess Kersey, Bill Oakes

TNT

May 13
8:00 PM

Boxscore

New York Knicks 102, Chicago Bulls 104
Scoring by quarter: 22–30, 24–27, 24–32, 32–15
Pts: Patrick Ewing 34; Rebs: Ewing, Oakley 9 each Asts: John Starks 6	Pts: Scottie Pippen 25; Rebs: Horace Grant 8 Asts: Horace Grant 6
New York leads series, 2–1

Chicago Stadium, Chicago, Illinois
Attendance: 18,676
Referees: Dick Bavetta, Steve Javie, Paul Mihalak

- This game saw a bench clearing brawl between Derek Harper and Jo Jo English that rolled into the stands, and took place immediately in front of then NBA Commissioner David Stern.
- Toni Kukoč hits the game-winner at the buzzer.

NBC

May 15
5:30 PM

Boxscore

New York Knicks 83, Chicago Bulls 95
Scoring by quarter: 24–25, 17–28, 24–26, 18–16
Pts: Patrick Ewing 18; Rebs: Charles Oakley 17; Asts: Anthony, Starks 6 each	Pts: Scottie Pippen 25; Rebs: Scottie Pippen 8 Asts: Pippen, Kukoč 6 each
Series tied, 2–2

Chicago Stadium, Chicago, Illinois
Attendance: 18,676
Referees: Ron Garretson, Jake O'Donnell, Bennett Salvatore

TNT

May 18
8:00 PM

Boxscore

Chicago Bulls 86, New York Knicks 87
Scoring by quarter: 29–26, 17–19, 25–28, 15–14
Pts: Scottie Pippen 23; Rebs: three players 6 each Asts: three players 4 each	Pts: Patrick Ewing 20; Rebs: Patrick Ewing 13; Asts: Greg Anthony 8
New York leads series, 3–2

Madison Square Garden, New York City, New York
Attendance: 19,763
Referees: Dan Crawford, Darell Garretson, Hue Hollins

- Hue Hollins called a "phantom foul" with 2.1 seconds left in the fourth quarter, when the Knicks' Hubert Davis attempted a 2-point shot which was contested by the Bulls' Scottie Pippen. Davis successfully made both free throw attempts to assist in the Knicks' 87–86 victory. Chicago head coach Phil Jackson, upset over the outcome of the game, was fined US$10,000 for comparing the loss to the gold medal game controversy at the 1972 Summer Olympics.

TNT

May 20
8:00 PM

Boxscore

New York Knicks 79, Chicago Bulls 93
Scoring by quarter: 17–30, 24–22, 19–24, 19–17
Pts: Patrick Ewing 26; Rebs: Patrick Ewing 14; Asts: John Starks 7	Pts: B. J. Armstrong 20; Rebs: Horace Grant 12; Asts: Scottie Pippen 5
Series tied, 3–3

Chicago Stadium, Chicago, Illinois
Attendance: 18,676
Referees: Hugh Evans, Mike Mathis, Jack Nies

- Scottie Pippen's famous dunk on Patrick Ewing; final Bulls game at Chicago Stadium.

NBC

May 22
3:30 PM

Boxscore

Chicago Bulls 77, New York Knicks 87
Scoring by quarter: 19–22, 18–16, 26–29, 14–20
Pts: Scottie Pippen 20; Rebs: Scottie Pippen 16; Asts: Scottie Pippen 5	Pts: Patrick Ewing 18; Rebs: Charles Oakley 20; Asts: Patrick Ewing 6
New York wins series, 4–3

Madison Square Garden, New York City, New York
Attendance: 19,763
Referees: Joe Crawford, Jack Madden, Ed T. Rush

Regular-season series
New York won 3–1 in the regular-season series

December 17, 1993

Recap

New York Knicks 86, Chicago Bulls 98

Chicago Stadium, Chicago, Illinois

February 20, 1994

Recap

Chicago Bulls 68, New York Knicks 86

Madison Square Garden, New York City

March 22, 1994

Recap

Chicago Bulls 78, New York Knicks 87

Madison Square Garden, New York City

April 24, 1994

Recap

New York Knicks 92, Chicago Bulls 76

Chicago Stadium, Chicago, Illinois

This was the sixth playoff meeting between these two teams, with the Bulls winning the first five meetings.

Previous playoff series
Chicago leads 5–0 in all-time playoff series

1981

Chicago Bulls 2, New York Knicks 0

1981 Eastern Conference First Round

1989

Chicago Bulls 4, New York Knicks 2

1989 Eastern Conference Semifinals

1991

Chicago Bulls 3, New York Knicks 0

1991 Eastern Conference First Round

1992

Chicago Bulls 4, New York Knicks 3

1992 Eastern Conference Semifinals

1993

Chicago Bulls 4, New York Knicks 2

1993 Eastern Conference Finals

=== Western Conference semifinals ===
==== (2) Houston Rockets vs. (3) Phoenix Suns ====
NBC

May 8
3:00 PM

Boxscore

Phoenix Suns 91, Houston Rockets 87
Scoring by quarter: 17–27, 20–18, 24–21, 30–21
Pts: Charles Barkley 21; Rebs: Charles Barkley 12; Asts: Kevin Johnson 12	Pts: Hakeem Olajuwon 36; Rebs: Hakeem Olajuwon 16; Asts: Maxwell, Horry 8 each
Phoenix leads series, 1–0

The Summit, Houston, Texas
Attendance: 15,073
Referees: Joe Crawford, Bob Delaney, Bennett Salvatore

TNT

May 11
9:30 PM

Boxscore

Phoenix Suns 124, Houston Rockets 117 (OT)
Scoring by quarter: 32–28, 27–32, 23–40, 26–8, Overtime: 16–9
Pts: Charles Barkley 34; Rebs: Charles Barkley 15; Asts: Barkley, Johnson 6 each	Pts: Hakeem Olajuwon 31; Rebs: Hakeem Olajuwon 17; Asts: Vernon Maxwell 9
Phoenix leads series, 2–0

The Summit, Houston, Texas
Attendance: 16,611
Referees: Dan Crawford, Tommy Nunez Sr., Jake O'Donnell

TNT

May 13
10:30 PM

Boxscore

Houston Rockets 118, Phoenix Suns 102
Scoring by quarter: 15–29, 26–20, 38–28, 39–25
Pts: Vernon Maxwell 34; Rebs: Hakeem Olajuwon 15; Asts: Sam Cassell 10	Pts: Kevin Johnson 38; Rebs: Charles Barkley 14; Asts: Kevin Johnson 12
Phoenix leads series, 2–1

America West Arena, Phoenix, Arizona
Attendance: 19,023
Referees: Hue Hollins, Ronnie Nunn, Ed T. Rush

NBC

May 15
3:00 PM

Boxscore

Houston Rockets 107, Phoenix Suns 96
Scoring by quarter: 25–20, 27–26, 21–20, 34–30
Pts: Hakeem Olajuwon 28; Rebs: Otis Thorpe 13; Asts: Hakeem Olajuwon 8	Pts: Kevin Johnson 38; Rebs: Charles Barkley 14; Asts: Kevin Johnson 12
Series tied, 2–2

America West Arena, Phoenix, Arizona
Attendance: 19,023
Referees: Dick Bavetta, Steve Javie, Paul Mihalak

- Kevin Johnson's famous dunk on Hakeem Olajuwon.

TNT

May 17
9:00 PM

Boxscore

Phoenix Suns 86, Houston Rockets 109
Scoring by quarter: 21–32, 16–26, 24–29, 25–22
Pts: Charles Barkley 30; Rebs: Oliver Miller 7 Asts: Miller, Henry 3 each	Pts: Thorpe, Olajuwon 20 each Rebs: Hakeem Olajuwon 13; Asts: Kenny Smith 8
Houston leads series, 3–2

The Summit, Houston, Texas
Attendance: 16,611
Referees: Hugh Evans, Joe Forte, Jack Nies

TNT

May 19
11:30 PM

Boxscore

Houston Rockets 89, Phoenix Suns 103
Scoring by quarter: 22–20, 25–30, 19–26, 23–27
Pts: Hakeem Olajuwon 23; Rebs: Hakeem Olajuwon 12; Asts: Hakeem Olajuwon 5	Pts: Kevin Johnson 28; Rebs: Charles Barkley 15; Asts: Kevin Johnson 13
Series tied, 3–3

America West Arena, Phoenix, Arizona
Attendance: 19,023
Referees: Joe Crawford, Jack Madden, Eddie F. Rush

NBC

May 21
1:00 PM

Boxscore

Phoenix Suns 94, Houston Rockets 104
Scoring by quarter: 21–33, 26–20, 29–27, 18–24
Pts: Kevin Johnson 25; Rebs: Charles Barkley 15; Asts: Kevin Johnson 11	Pts: Hakeem Olajuwon 37; Rebs: Hakeem Olajuwon 17; Asts: Sam Cassell 7
Houston wins series, 4–3

The Summit, Houston, Texas
Attendance: 16,611
Referees: Dick Bavetta, Darell Garretson, Bill Oakes

- The Rockets become the second team to win a best-of-seven playoff series after losing the first 2 games at home.

Regular-season series
Tied 2–2 in the regular-season series

November 13, 1993

Recap

Phoenix Suns 95, Houston Rockets 99

The Summit, Houston

December 25, 1993

Recap

Houston Rockets 91, Phoenix Suns 111

America West Arena, Phoenix, Arizona

February 19, 1994

Recap

Phoenix Suns 88, Houston Rockets 106

The Summit, Houston

March 27, 1994

Recap

Houston Rockets 98, Phoenix Suns 113

America West Arena, Phoenix, Arizona

This was the first playoff meeting between the Rockets and the Suns.

==== (5) Utah Jazz vs. (8) Denver Nuggets ====
TNT

May 10
10:30 PM

Boxscore

Denver Nuggets 91, Utah Jazz 100
Scoring by quarter: 25–30, 19–23, 18–20, 29–27
Pts: Dikembe Mutombo 20; Rebs: LaPhonso Ellis 12; Asts: Mahmoud Abdul-Rauf 5	Pts: Karl Malone 25; Rebs: Karl Malone 10; Asts: John Stockton 11
Utah leads series, 1–0

Delta Center, Salt Lake City, Utah
Attendance: 19,911
Referees: Hugh Evans, Bennett Salvatore, Greg Willard

TNT

May 12
10:30 PM

Boxscore

Denver Nuggets 94, Utah Jazz 104
Scoring by quarter: 24–22, 24–30, 26–25, 20–27
Pts: Mahmoud Abdul-Rauf 23; Rebs: Dikembe Mutombo 13; Asts: Robert Pack 6	Pts: Karl Malone 32; Rebs: Karl Malone 12; Asts: John Stockton 8
Utah leads series, 2–0

Delta Center, Salt Lake City, Utah
Attendance: 19,911
Referees: Jim Clark, Ron Garretson, Mike Mathis

NBC

May 14
3:30 PM

Boxscore

Utah Jazz 111, Denver Nuggets 109 (OT)
Scoring by quarter: 27–21, 18–23, 33–27, 20–27, Overtime: 13–11
Pts: Jeff Hornacek 27; Rebs: Karl Malone 13; Asts: John Stockton 13	Pts: LaPhonso Ellis 25; Rebs: Dikembe Mutombo 13; Asts: Robert Pack 8
Utah leads series, 3–0

McNichols Sports Arena, Denver, Colorado
Attendance: 17,171
Referees: Darell Garretson, Bill Oakes, Eddie F. Rush

- Karl Malone hits the game-tying shot with 9.2 seconds left.

TNT

May 15
8:00 PM

Boxscore

Utah Jazz 82, Denver Nuggets 83
Scoring by quarter: 17–19, 18–19, 24–20, 23–25
Pts: Karl Malone 20; Rebs: Karl Malone 9 Asts: John Stockton 6	Pts: Reggie Williams 21; Rebs: Dikembe Mutombo 11; Asts: Mahmoud Abdul-Rauf 6
Utah leads series, 3–1

McNichols Sports Arena, Denver, Colorado
Attendance: 17,171
Referees: Jess Kersey, Jack Nies, Ronnie Nunn

- Reggie Williams hits the game-winner with 1.9 seconds left.

(Note: Not televised nationally. Game was televised regionally in the Denver and Utah markets due to TBS airing an Atlanta Braves game.)

May 17
11:30 PM

Boxscore

Denver Nuggets 109, Utah Jazz 101 (2OT)
Scoring by quarter: 15–18, 24–20, 22–25, 26–24, Overtime: 7–7, 15–7
Pts: Stith, Abdul-Rauf 22 each Rebs: LaPhonso Ellis 11; Asts: Robert Pack 7	Pts: Karl Malone 22; Rebs: Corbin, Spencer 14 each Asts: John Stockton 13
Utah leads series, 3–2

Delta Center, Salt Lake City, Utah
Attendance: 19,911
Referees: Joe Crawford, Jack Madden, Tommy Nunez Sr.

TNT

May 19
9:00 PM

Boxscore

Utah Jazz 91, Denver Nuggets 94
Scoring by quarter: 27–23, 26–25, 21–19, 17–27
Pts: Karl Malone 31; Rebs: Karl Malone 15; Asts: John Stockton 7	Pts: Dikembe Mutombo 23; Rebs: Dikembe Mutombo 12; Asts: three players 2 each
Series tied, 3–3

McNichols Sports Arena, Denver, Colorado
Attendance: 17,171
Referees: Dick Bavetta, Joe Forte, Ed T. Rush

- Denver became the first team since the 1951 New York Knicks to force a Game 7 after being down 0–3.

NBC

May 21
3:30 PM

Boxscore

Denver Nuggets 81, Utah Jazz 91
Scoring by quarter: 12–19, 26–27, 21–28, 22–17
Pts: Reggie Williams 17; Rebs: Dikembe Mutombo 17; Asts: Robert Pack 3	Pts: Karl Malone 31; Rebs: Karl Malone 14; Asts: John Stockton 9
Utah wins series, 4–3

Delta Center, Salt Lake City, Utah
Attendance: 19,911
Referees: Steve Javie, Jess Kersey, Jake O'Donnell

Regular-season series
Utah won 4–1 in the regular-season series

November 30, 1993

Recap

Denver Nuggets 92, Utah Jazz 103

Delta Center, Salt Lake City

December 10, 1993

Recap

Utah Jazz 98, Denver Nuggets 107

McNichols Sports Arena, Denver, Colorado

February 8, 1994

Recap

Utah Jazz 96, Denver Nuggets 95

McNichols Sports Arena, Denver, Colorado

April 2, 1994

Recap

Denver Nuggets 91, Utah Jazz 101

Delta Center, Salt Lake City

April 22, 1994

Recap

Utah Jazz 113, Denver Nuggets 106

McNichols Sports Arena, Denver, Colorado

This was the third playoff meeting between these two teams, with each team winning one series apiece.

Previous playoff series
Tied 1–1 in all-time playoff series

1984

Denver Nuggets 2, Utah Jazz 3

1984 Western Conference First Round

1985

Denver Nuggets 4, Utah Jazz 1

1985 Western Conference Semifinals

== Conference finals ==
=== Eastern Conference finals ===
==== (2) New York Knicks vs. (5) Indiana Pacers ====
TNT

May 24
8:00 PM

Boxscore

Indiana Pacers 89, New York Knicks 100
Scoring by quarter: 20–26, 17–27, 26–17, 26–30
Pts: Rik Smits 27; Rebs: D. Davis, Smits 10 each Asts: Haywoode Workman 7	Pts: Patrick Ewing 28; Rebs: Charles Oakley 13; Asts: John Starks 6
New York leads series, 1–0

Madison Square Garden, New York City, New York
Attendance: 19,763
Referees: Steve Javie, Bill Oakes, Jake O'Donnell

TNT

May 26
8:00 PM

Boxscore

Indiana Pacers 78, New York Knicks 89
Scoring by quarter: 19–25, 21–15, 22–26, 16–23
Pts: Reggie Miller 23; Rebs: Dale Davis 11; Asts: McKey, Workman 6 each	Pts: Patrick Ewing 32; Rebs: Patrick Ewing 13; Asts: Derek Harper 8
New York leads series, 2–0

Madison Square Garden, New York City, New York
Attendance: 19,763
Referees: Darell Garretson, Jess Kersey, Eddie F. Rush

NBC

May 28
3:30 PM

Boxscore

New York Knicks 68, Indiana Pacers 88
Scoring by quarter: 19–21, 20–16, 13–25, 16–26
Pts: Oakley, Starks 12 each Rebs: Charles Oakley 9 Asts: Greg Anthony 4	Pts: Derrick McKey 15; Rebs: Antonio Davis 10; Asts: Haywoode Workman 7
New York leads series, 2–1

Market Square Arena, Indianapolis, Indiana
Attendance: 16,530
Referees: Dick Bavetta, Joe Forte, Mike Mathis

NBC

May 30
3:30 PM

Boxscore

New York Knicks 77, Indiana Pacers 83
Scoring by quarter: 20–17, 19–25, 16–20, 22–21
Pts: Patrick Ewing 25; Rebs: Charles Oakley 15; Asts: John Starks 4	Pts: Reggie Miller 31; Rebs: three players 7 each Asts: Haywoode Workman 6
Series tied, 2–2

Market Square Arena, Indianapolis, Indiana
Attendance: 16,536
Referees: Hugh Evans, Hue Hollins, Bennett Salvatore

NBC

June 1
9:00 PM

Boxscore

Indiana Pacers 93, New York Knicks 86
Scoring by quarter: 16–28, 19–15, 23–27, 35–16
Pts: Reggie Miller 39; Rebs: Dale Davis 12; Asts: Reggie Miller 6	Pts: Patrick Ewing 29; Rebs: Charles Oakley 13; Asts: John Starks 8
Indiana leads series, 3–2

Madison Square Garden, New York City, New York
Referees: Dan Crawford, Joe Crawford, Jack Madden

- Reggie Miller's 25-point 4th quarter performance.

NBC

June 3
9:00 PM

Boxscore

New York Knicks 98, Indiana Pacers 91
Scoring by quarter: 33–31, 25–20, 22–18, 18–22
Pts: John Starks 26; Rebs: Patrick Ewing 10; Asts: John Starks 6	Pts: Reggie Miller 27; Rebs: Antonio Davis 9 Asts: McKey, Fleming 5 each
Series tied, 3–3

Market Square Arena, Indianapolis, Indiana
Attendance: 16,529
Referees: Darell Garretson, Jess Kersey, Ed T. Rush

NBC

June 5
7:00 PM

Boxscore

Indiana Pacers 90, New York Knicks 94
Scoring by quarter: 23–24, 28–23, 20–20, 19–27
Pts: Reggie Miller 25; Rebs: Smits, A. Davis 6 each Asts: McKey, Workman 8 each	Pts: Patrick Ewing 24; Rebs: Patrick Ewing 22; Asts: Patrick Ewing 7
New York wins series, 4–3

Madison Square Garden, New York City, New York
Attendance: 19,763
Referees: Hugh Evans, Mike Mathis, Jake O'Donnell

- Patrick Ewing's clutch dunk with 26.9 seconds left.

Regular-season series
New York won 4–0 in the regular-season series

November 12, 1993

Recap

New York Knicks 103, Indiana Pacers 84

Market Square Arena, Indianapolis

December 11, 1993

Recap

Indiana Pacers 91, New York Knicks 98

Madison Square Garden, New York City

March 15, 1994

Recap

Indiana Pacers 82, New York Knicks 88

Madison Square Garden, New York City

March 25, 1994

Recap

New York Knicks 85, Indiana Pacers 82

Market Square Arena, Indianapolis

This was the second playoff meeting between these two teams, with the Knicks winning the first meeting.

Previous playoff series
New York leads 1–0 in all-time playoff series

1993

Indiana Pacers 1, New York Knicks 3

1993 Eastern Conference First Round

=== Western Conference finals ===
==== (2) Houston Rockets vs. (5) Utah Jazz ====
TNT

May 23
9:00 PM

Boxscore

Utah Jazz 88, Houston Rockets 100
Scoring by quarter: 16–20, 18–34, 30–25, 24–21
Pts: Karl Malone 20; Rebs: Karl Malone 16; Asts: John Stockton 11	Pts: Hakeem Olajuwon 31; Rebs: Robert Horry 11; Asts: Sam Cassell 7
Houston leads series, 1–0

The Summit, Houston, Texas
Attendance: 16,260
Referees: Ron Garretson, Hue Hollins, Mike Mathis

TNT

May 25
9:00 PM

Boxscore

Utah Jazz 99, Houston Rockets 104
Scoring by quarter: 22–21, 24–27, 23–25, 30–31
Pts: Karl Malone 32; Rebs: Malone, Spencer 7 each Asts: John Stockton 10	Pts: Hakeem Olajuwon 41; Rebs: Hakeem Olajuwon 13; Asts: Kenny Smith 7
Houston leads series, 2–0

The Summit, Houston, Texas
Attendance: 16,611
Referees: Dan Crawford, Hugh Evans, Bennett Salvatore

TNT

May 27
9:00 PM

Boxscore

Houston Rockets 86, Utah Jazz 95
Scoring by quarter: 20–25, 20–27, 27–26, 19–17
Pts: Hakeem Olajuwon 29; Rebs: Hakeem Olajuwon 13; Asts: Hakeem Olajuwon 5	Pts: Karl Malone 22; Rebs: Karl Malone 16; Asts: John Stockton 11
Houston leads series, 2–1

Delta Center, Salt Lake City, Utah
Attendance: 19,911
Referees: Joe Crawford, Jack Madden, Jack Nies

NBC

May 29
3:30 PM

Boxscore

Houston Rockets 80, Utah Jazz 78
Scoring by quarter: 25–21, 13–10, 22–19, 20–28
Pts: Kenny Smith 25; Rebs: Robert Horry 10; Asts: Robert Horry 5	Pts: Karl Malone 25; Rebs: Karl Malone 14; Asts: John Stockton 6
Houston leads series, 3–1

Delta Center, Salt Lake City, Utah
Attendance: 19,911
Referees: Jess Kersey, Bill Oakes, Ed T. Rush

NBC

May 31
9:00 PM

Boxscore

Utah Jazz 83, Houston Rockets 94
Scoring by quarter: 20–33, 15–20, 20–26, 28–15
Pts: Karl Malone 31; Rebs: Felton Spencer 15; Asts: John Stockton 9	Pts: Olajuwon, Horry 22 each Rebs: Otis Thorpe 16; Asts: Sam Cassell 7
Houston wins series, 4–1

The Summit, Houston, Texas
Attendance: 16,611
Referees: Dick Bavetta, Steve Javie, Jake O'Donnell

Regular-season series
Tied 3–3 in the regular-season series

November 24, 1993

Recap

Houston Rockets 95, Utah Jazz 93 (OT)

Delta Center, Salt Lake City

January 22, 1994

Recap

Utah Jazz 101, Houston Rockets 106

The Summit, Houston

February 1, 1994

Recap

Houston Rockets 88, Utah Jazz 104

Delta Center, Salt Lake City

February 26, 1994

Recap

Utah Jazz 95, Houston Rockets 85

The Summit, Houston

February 28, 1994

Recap

Houston Rockets 85, Utah Jazz 89

Delta Center, Salt Lake City

March 26, 1994

Recap

Utah Jazz 83, Houston Rockets 98

The Summit, Houston

This was the second playoff meeting between these two teams, with the Jazz winning the first meeting.

Previous playoff series
Utah leads 1–0 in all-time playoff series

1985

Houston Rockets 2, Utah Jazz 3

1985 Western Conference First Round

== NBA Finals (W2) Houston Rockets vs. (E2) New York Knicks ==
NBC

June 8
9:00 PM

Boxscore

New York Knicks 78, Houston Rockets 85
Scoring by quarter: 24–26, 22–28, 17–18, 15–13
Pts: Patrick Ewing 23; Rebs: Charles Oakley 14; Asts: Derek Harper 5	Pts: Hakeem Olajuwon 28; Rebs: Otis Thorpe 16; Asts: Kenny Smith 5
Houston leads series, 1–0

The Summit, Houston, Texas
Attendance: 16,611
Referees: Joe Crawford, Jack Madden, Dick Bavetta

NBC

June 10
9:00 PM

Boxscore

New York Knicks 91, Houston Rockets 83
Scoring by quarter: 24–20, 18–22, 30–23, 19–18
Pts: John Starks 19; Rebs: Patrick Ewing 13; Asts: John Starks 9	Pts: Hakeem Olajuwon 25; Rebs: Otis Thorpe 12; Asts: Kenny Smith 6
Series tied, 1–1

The Summit, Houston, Texas
Attendance: 16,611
Referees: Darell Garretson, Ed T. Rush, Hue Hollins

NBC

June 12
7:00 PM

Boxscore

Houston Rockets 93, New York Knicks 89
Scoring by quarter: 26–18, 19–20, 24–25, 24–26
Pts: Hakeem Olajuwon 21; Rebs: Hakeem Olajuwon 11; Asts: Hakeem Olajuwon 7	Pts: Derek Harper 21; Rebs: Patrick Ewing 13; Asts: John Starks 9
Houston leads series, 2–1

Madison Square Garden, New York City, New York
Attendance: 19,763
Referees: Jake O'Donnell, Jess Kersey, Bill Oakes

- Sam Cassell hits the game-winning 3 with 32.6 seconds left.

NBC

June 15
9:00 PM

Boxscore

Houston Rockets 82, New York Knicks 91
Scoring by quarter: 14–19, 19–21, 28–20, 21–31
Pts: Hakeem Olajuwon 32; Rebs: Otis Thorpe 10; Asts: Sam Cassell 5	Pts: Derek Harper 21; Rebs: Charles Oakley 20; Asts: Derek Harper 5
Series tied, 2–2

Madison Square Garden, New York City, New York
Attendance: 19,763
Referees: Hugh Evans, Joe Crawford, Mike Mathis

NBC

June 17
9:00 PM

Boxscore

Houston Rockets 84, New York Knicks 91
Scoring by quarter: 21–22, 16–26, 24–13, 23–30
Pts: Hakeem Olajuwon 27; Rebs: Otis Thorpe 13; Asts: Robert Horry 6	Pts: Patrick Ewing 25; Rebs: Patrick Ewing 12; Asts: Derek Harper 7
New York leads series, 3–2

Madison Square Garden, New York City, New York
Attendance: 19,763
Referees: Darell Garretson, Ed T. Rush, Dick Bavetta

NBC

June 19
7:00 PM

Boxscore

New York Knicks 84, Houston Rockets 86
Scoring by quarter: 21–21, 15–25, 26–19, 22–21
Pts: John Starks 27; Rebs: Patrick Ewing 15; Asts: Derek Harper 10	Pts: Hakeem Olajuwon 30; Rebs: Olajuwon, Thorpe 10 each Asts: Otis Thorpe 6
Series tied, 3–3

The Summit, Houston, Texas
Attendance: 16,611
Referees: Jake O'Donnell, Jess Kersey, Jack Madden

- Hakeem Olajuwon blocks John Starks' title-winning 3-point attempt.

NBC

June 22
9:00 PM

Boxscore

New York Knicks 84, Houston Rockets 90
Scoring by quarter: 21–22, 22–23, 17–18, 24–27
Pts: Derek Harper 23; Rebs: Charles Oakley 14; Asts: Derek Harper 5	Pts: Hakeem Olajuwon 25; Rebs: Hakeem Olajuwon 10; Asts: Hakeem Olajuwon 7
Houston wins series, 4–3

The Summit, Houston, Texas
Attendance: 16,611
Referees: Hugh Evans, Joe Crawford, Ed T. Rush

Regular-season series
Houston won 2–0 in the regular-season series

December 2, 1993

Recap

Houston Rockets 94, New York Knicks 85

Madison Square Garden, New York City

February 24, 1994

Recap

New York Knicks 73, Houston Rockets 93

The Summit, Houston

This was the second playoff meeting between these two teams, with the Rockets winning the first meeting.

Previous playoff series
Houston leads 1–0 in all-time playoff series

1975

Houston Rockets 2, New York Knicks 1

1975 Eastern Conference First Round

== Statistical leaders ==
Category	Game high			Average			
Category	Player	Team	High	Player	Team	Avg.	GP
Points	Charles Barkley	Phoenix Suns	56	Hakeem Olajuwon	Houston Rockets	28.9	23
Rebounds	Charles Oakley	New York Knicks	24	Dennis Rodman	San Antonio Spurs	16.0	3
Assists	Mookie Blaylock; John Stockton	Atlanta Hawks; Utah Jazz	18	John Stockton	Utah Jazz	9.8	16
Steals	Haywoode Workman	Indiana Pacers	7	Charles Barkley	Phoenix Suns	2.5	10
Blocks	Patrick Ewing; Dikembe Mutombo	New York Knicks; Denver Nuggets	8	Dikembe Mutombo	Denver Nuggets	5.8	12
