= Peter Myers =

Peter Myers may refer to:

- Peter C. Myers (1931–2012), American politician in Missouri
- Peter Myers (basketball) (fl. 1984–1985), Australian basketball player
- Pete Myers (born 1963), American basketball player
- Pete Myers (radio broadcaster) (1939—1998) one of the founding DJs on BBC Radio One. Also BBC World Service and Radio Netherlands Worldwide.
- Pete "Mad Daddy" Myers (fl. 1950s–1960s), American radio disk jockey with WKNR
- Peter Myers, a character in the TV series Bitten

== See also ==
- Peter Myers Pork Packing Plant and Willard Coleman Building, a packing house in Janesville, Wisconsin, built in 1851
