= 1993–94 Chicago Bulls season =

NBA professional basketball team season

- Head coach: Phil Jackson
- General manager: Jerry Krause
- Owners: Jerry Reinsdorf
- Arena: Chicago Stadium

Results
- Record: 55–27 (.671)
- Place: Division: 2nd (Central); Conference: 3rd (Eastern)
- Playoff finish: Conference semifinals (lost to Knicks 3–4)
- Stats at Basketball Reference

Local media
- Television: WGN-TV; SportsChannel Chicago
- Radio: WMAQ

The 1993–94 Chicago Bulls season was the 28th season for the Chicago Bulls in the National Basketball Association. The Bulls entered the regular season as the three-time defending NBA champions, having defeated the Phoenix Suns in the 1993 NBA Finals in six games, winning their third NBA championship, their first of two threepeats in the 1990s. This was their first season without All-Star guard Michael Jordan since the 1983–84 season, as he retired during the off-season to pursue a baseball career after the murder of his father, James Jordan.

== Season summary ==
=== Off-season ===
During the off-season, the Bulls signed free agents Steve Kerr, Bill Wennington, and Pete Myers, who was signed to fill in the void left by Jordan at the shooting guard position. Croatian rookie small forward Toni Kukoč, who was drafted by the Bulls as the 29th overall pick in the 1990 NBA draft, made his debut in the NBA this season.

=== Regular season ===
With the addition of Kukoč, Myers and Kerr, the Bulls struggled, losing seven of their first eleven games of the regular season, but then won 14 of their next 15 games, including a 10-game winning streak in December. The team posted a seven-game winning streak in January, and later on held a 34–13 record at the All-Star break. At mid-season, the Bulls traded Stacey King to the Minnesota Timberwolves in exchange for Australian center Luc Longley. The Bulls posted another 10-game winning streak between March and April, and finished in second place in the Central Division with a 55–27 record, earning the third seed in the Eastern Conference. The team qualified for the NBA playoffs for the tenth consecutive year.

Scottie Pippen averaged 22.0 points, 8.7 rebounds, 5.6 assists and 2.9 steals per game, and was named to the All-NBA First Team, and NBA All-Defensive First Team, while Horace Grant averaged 15.1 points, 11.0 rebounds and 1.2 blocks per game, and was named to the NBA All-Defensive Second Team, and B. J. Armstrong provided the team with 14.8 points and 3.9 assists per game. In addition, off the bench, Kukoč provided with 10.9 points, 4.0 rebounds and 3.4 assists per game, and was named to the NBA All-Rookie Second Team, while Kerr contributed 8.6 points per game, Myers contributed 7.9 points per game as the team's starting shooting guard, Wennington averaged 7.1 points and 4.6 rebounds per game, and Bill Cartwright provided with 5.6 points per game, but only played just 42 games due to injury.

During the NBA All-Star weekend at the Target Center in Minneapolis, Minnesota, Pippen, Grant and Armstrong were all selected for the 1994 NBA All-Star Game, as members of the Eastern Conference All-Star team; it was the first and only All-Star appearance for both Grant and Armstrong. Pippen scored 29 points along with 11 rebounds and 4 steals, and was named the NBA All-Star Game Most Valuable Player, as the Eastern Conference defeated the Western Conference, 127–118. Meanwhile, Armstrong and Kerr both participated in the NBA Three-Point Shootout, and Kukoč was selected for the inaugural NBA Rookie Game, as a member of the Phenoms team.

Pippen finished in third place in Most Valuable Player voting, behind Hakeem Olajuwon of the Houston Rockets, and David Robinson of the San Antonio Spurs, and also finished in fourth place in Defensive Player of the Year voting, with Grant finishing in tenth place; Kerr finished tied in sixth place in Sixth Man of the Year voting, while Myers finished tied in seventh place in Most Improved Player voting, and head coach Phil Jackson finished in second place in Coach of the Year voting, behind Lenny Wilkens of the Atlanta Hawks. The Bulls finished seventh in the NBA in home-game attendance, with an attendance of 760,816 at the Chicago Stadium during the regular season.

=== NBA playoffs ===
In the Eastern Conference First Round of the 1994 NBA playoffs, and for the third consecutive year, the Bulls faced off against the 6th–seeded Cleveland Cavaliers, a team that featured All-Star guard Mark Price, Gerald Wilkins and Tyrone Hill. The Cavaliers lacked big men for the series as All-Star center Brad Daugherty, All-Star forward Larry Nance, and Hot Rod Williams were all out due to season-ending injuries. The Bulls won the first two games over the Cavaliers at home at the Chicago Stadium, before winning Game 3 on the road in overtime, 95–92 at the Coliseum at Richfield to win the series in a three-game sweep.

In the Eastern Conference Semi-finals, and for the fourth consecutive year, the team faced off against the 2nd–seeded, and Atlantic Division champion New York Knicks, who were led by the All-Star trio of Patrick Ewing, John Starks, and former Bulls forward Charles Oakley. The Bulls lost the first two games to the Knicks on the road at Madison Square Garden, but then won the next two games at the Chicago Stadium. After losing Game 5 on the road by a score of 87–86, the Bulls won Game 6 over the Knicks at home, 93–79 to even the series. However, the Bulls were unable to win a fourth consecutive NBA championship, as the team lost Game 7 to the Knicks at Madison Square Garden, 87–77, thus losing in a hard-fought seven-game series.

The Knicks would advance to the 1994 NBA Finals, but would lose to the Rockets in a full seven-game series.

=== Notable incidents ===
One notable incident of the NBA playoffs occurred in Game 3 of the Eastern Conference Semi-finals, against the Knicks at the Chicago Stadium on May 13, 1994. During the second quarter, second-year guard Jo Jo English and Knicks guard Derek Harper both got into a brawl, which spilled into the stands near the fans; the brawl also occurred in front of NBA commissioner David Stern, who was in attendance. Harper was fined $15,000 and suspended for two games, while English was fined $10,000 and suspended for one game.

Another incident in Game 3 occurred late in the fourth quarter; with 1.8 seconds remaining and the score tied at 102–102, Jackson designed a play for Kukoč to take the game-winning shot, and with Pippen making an inbound pass to Kukoč. Pippen was upset that the play was not designed for him, argued with Jackson and refused to enter the game. The Bulls had to called another timeout as Jackson put Myers in the game to replace Pippen. Kukoč took the inbound pass from Myers, and hit a 22-foot jumper over Knicks defender Anthony Mason at the buzzer; the Bulls defeated the Knicks by a score of 104–102.

=== Aftermath ===
This was also the Bulls' final season in which they played their home games at the Chicago Stadium, before moving across the street to their new arena, the United Center. Following the season, Grant signed as a free agent with the Orlando Magic after seven seasons with the Bulls, while Cartwright signed with the Seattle SuperSonics, Scott Williams signed with the Philadelphia 76ers, and John Paxson retired.

== Off-season ==
=== Jordan's retirement ===
On October 6, 1993, Michael Jordan announced his retirement at age 30, citing a loss in his desire to play the game. Jordan later stated that the murder of his father three months earlier shaped his decision. James R. Jordan, Sr. was murdered on July 23, 1993, at a highway rest area in Lumberton, North Carolina, found in a creek on August 3, murdered by two teenagers, Daniel Green and Larry Martin Demery. The assailants were traced from calls they made on James Jordan's cellular phone, caught, convicted and sentenced to life in prison. Jordan was close to his father; as a child he had imitated his father's proclivity to stick out his tongue while absorbed in work.

Those close to Jordan claimed that he had been considering retirement as early as the summer of 1992, and that the added exhaustion due to the Dream Team run in the 1992 Olympics solidified Jordan's burned-out feelings about the game and his ever-growing celebrity status. Jordan's announcement sent shock waves throughout the NBA and appeared on the front pages of newspapers around the world.

Jordan then further surprised the sports world by signing a minor league baseball contract with the Chicago White Sox. He reported to spring training and was assigned to the team's minor league system on March 31, 1994. Jordan has stated this decision was made to pursue the dream of his late father, who had always envisioned his son as a major league baseball player. The White Sox were another team owned by Bulls owner Jerry Reinsdorf, who continued to honor Jordan's basketball contract during the years he played baseball. He had an unspectacular professional baseball career for the Birmingham Barons, a Chicago White Sox farm team, batting .202 with 3 HR, 51 RBI, 30 SB, and 11 errors. He also appeared for the Scottsdale Scorpions in the 1994 Arizona Fall League.

=== NBA draft ===
| Round | Pick | Player | Position | Nationality | School/Club team |
|---|---|---|---|---|---|
| 1 | 25 | Corie Blount | PF | United States | Cincinnati |
| 2 | 41 | Anthony Reed | F | United States | Tulane |

== Roster ==
1993–94 Chicago Bulls roster
Players

| Pos. | No. | Player | Height | Weight | DOB | From |
|---|---|---|---|---|---|---|
| G | 10 | BJ Armstrong | 6 ft 2 in (1.88 m) | 175 lb (79 kg) | 1967–09–09 | Iowa |
| F | 44 | Corie Blount | 6 ft 10 in (2.08 m) | 240 lb (109 kg) | 1969–01–04 | Cincinnati |
| C | 24 | Bill Cartwright | 7 ft 1 in (2.16 m) | 245 lb (111 kg) | 1957–07–30 | San Francisco |
| G | 3 | Jo Jo English | 6 ft 4 in (1.93 m) | 195 lb (88 kg) | 1970–02–04 | South Carolina |
| F | 54 | Horace Grant | 6 ft 10 in (2.08 m) | 245 lb (111 kg) | 1965–07–04 | Clemson |
| G | 8 | Dave Johnson | 6 ft 7 in (2.01 m) | 210 lb (95 kg) | 1970–11–16 | Syracuse |
| G | 25 | Steve Kerr | 6 ft 1 in (1.85 m) | 175 lb (79 kg) | 1965–09–27 | Arizona |
| F | 7 | Toni Kukoc | 6 ft 11 in (2.11 m) | 192 lb (87 kg) | 1968–09–18 | Croatia |
| C | 13 | Luc Longley | 7 ft 2 in (2.18 m) | 265 lb (120 kg) | 1969–01–19 | New Mexico |
| G | 20 | Pete Myers | 6 ft 6 in (1.98 m) | 180 lb (82 kg) | 1963–09–15 | Little Rock |
| G | 5 | John Paxson | 6 ft 2 in (1.88 m) | 185 lb (84 kg) | 1960–09–29 | Notre Dame |
| C | 32 | Will Perdue | 7 ft 0 in (2.13 m) | 240 lb (109 kg) | 1965–08–29 | Vanderbilt |
| F | 33 | Scottie Pippen | 6 ft 8 in (2.03 m) | 220 lb (100 kg) | 1965–09–25 | Central Arkansas |
| C | 34 | Bill Wennington | 7 ft 0 in (2.13 m) | 245 lb (111 kg) | 1963–04–26 | St. John's |
| F/C | 42 | Scott Williams | 6 ft 10 in (2.08 m) | 230 lb (104 kg) | 1968–03–21 | North Carolina |

Coaches
Head coach
- Phil Jackson
Assistant(s)
- Johnny Bach
- Jim Cleamons
- Tex Winter

Legend
- (DP) Unsigned draft pick
- (FA) Free agent
- (S) Suspended
- Injured

Roster
Updated: March 28, 1994

== Regular season ==
Most experts did not predict the Bulls to even make the playoffs after winning their third straight championship the season before because of Jordan's departure. But the team, led by Scottie Pippen and an increased role from both Horace Grant and B. J. Armstrong were able to lead the Bulls to a 55-win season, only 2 wins less than the 1992–93 team, which had Jordan. The Bulls finished two games behind the Atlanta Hawks in the Central Division and earned the 3rd seed in the Eastern Conference Playoffs. Pippen and Armstrong were both voted to start in this season's All-Star game, and Grant was also picked as a reserve.

=== Season standings ===
| Central Division | W | L | PCT | GB | Home | Road | Div |
|---|---|---|---|---|---|---|---|
| y-Atlanta Hawks | 57 | 25 | .695 | – | 36–5 | 21–20 | 21–7 |
| x-Chicago Bulls | 55 | 27 | .671 | 2 | 31–10 | 24–17 | 21–7 |
| x-Indiana Pacers | 47 | 35 | .573 | 10 | 29–12 | 18–23 | 15–13 |
| x-Cleveland Cavaliers | 47 | 35 | .573 | 10 | 31–10 | 16–25 | 16–12 |
| Charlotte Hornets | 41 | 41 | .500 | 16 | 28–13 | 13–28 | 12–16 |
| Detroit Pistons | 20 | 62 | .244 | 37 | 10–31 | 10–31 | 4–24 |
| Milwaukee Bucks | 20 | 62 | .244 | 37 | 11–30 | 9–32 | 9–19 |

| # | Eastern Conference | | | | |
| # | Team | W | L | PCT | GB |
|---|---|---|---|---|---|
| 1 | c-Atlanta Hawks | 57 | 25 | .695 | – |
| 2 | y-New York Knicks | 57 | 25 | .695 | – |
| 3 | x-Chicago Bulls | 55 | 27 | .671 | 2 |
| 4 | x-Orlando Magic | 50 | 32 | .610 | 7 |
| 5 | x-Indiana Pacers | 47 | 35 | .573 | 10 |
| 6 | x-Cleveland Cavaliers | 47 | 35 | .573 | 10 |
| 7 | x-New Jersey Nets | 45 | 37 | .549 | 12 |
| 8 | x-Miami Heat | 42 | 40 | .512 | 15 |
| 9 | Charlotte Hornets | 41 | 41 | .500 | 16 |
| 10 | Boston Celtics | 32 | 50 | .390 | 25 |
| 11 | Philadelphia 76ers | 25 | 57 | .305 | 32 |
| 12 | Washington Bullets | 24 | 58 | .293 | 33 |
| 13 | Milwaukee Bucks | 20 | 62 | .244 | 37 |
| 14 | Detroit Pistons | 20 | 62 | .244 | 37 |

== Game log ==
=== Regular season ===
1993–94 game log
Total: 55–27 (home: 31–10; road: 24–17)
November: 6–7 (home: 2–2; road: 4–5)

| Game | Date | Team | Score | High points | High rebounds | High assists | Location Attendance | Record |
|---|---|---|---|---|---|---|---|---|
| 1 | November 5, 1993 | @ Charlotte | W 124–123 (OT) | B. J. Armstrong (28) | Scottie Pippen (16) | Scottie Pippen (7) | Charlotte Coliseum; 23,698 | 1–0 |
| 2 | November 6, 1993 | Miami | L 71–95 | Scottie Pippen (18) | Horace Grant (12) | B. J. Armstrong (3) | Chicago Stadium; 18,676 | 1–1 |
| 3 | November 8, 1993 | Atlanta | W 106–80 | B. J. Armstrong (23) | Horace Grant (10) | Pete Myers (7) | Chicago Stadium; 18,157 | 2–1 |
| 4 | November 10, 1993 | @ Milwaukee | W 91–90 | Horace Grant (20) | Horace Grant (10) | B. J. Armstrong (5) | Bradley Center; 18,633 | 3–1 |
| 5 | November 13, 1993 | Boston | L 97–98 | B. J. Armstrong (22) | Horace Grant (10) | Armstrong, Grant, Kerr (5) | Chicago Stadium; 18,676 | 3–2 |
| 6 | November 16, 1993 | @ Seattle | L 94–95 | Toni Kukoč (20) | Bill Cartwright (9) | Pete Myers (4) | Seattle Center Coliseum; 14,813 | 3–3 |
| 7 | November 18, 1993 | @ Portland | L 98–120 | | | | Memorial Coliseum | 3–4 |
| 8 | November 19, 1993 | @ L.A. Lakers | W 88–86 | | | | Great Western Forum | 4–4 |
| 9 | November 21, 1993 | @ Sacramento | L 101–103 | | | | ARCO Arena | 4–5 |
| 10 | November 23, 1993 | @ Houston | L 93–100 | | | | The Summit | 4–6 |
| 11 | November 24, 1993 | @ San Antonio | L 84–109 | | | | Alamodome | 4–7 |
| 12 | November 26, 1993 | @ Dallas | W 108–85 | | | | Reunion Arena | 5–7 |
| 13 | November 30, 1993 | Phoenix | W 132–113 | | | | Chicago Stadium | 6–7 |

December: 12–2 (home: 8–0; road: 4–2)

| Game | Date | Team | Score | High points | High rebounds | High assists | Location Attendance | Record |
|---|---|---|---|---|---|---|---|---|
| 14 | December 3, 1993 | @ Miami | W 104–99 | | | | Miami Arena | 7–7 |
| 15 | December 7, 1993 | L.A. Clippers | W 115–111 | | | | Chicago Stadium | 8–7 |
| 16 | December 8, 1993 | @ Philadelphia | L 88–95 (OT) | | | | The Spectrum | 8–8 |
| 17 | December 10, 1993 | @ New Jersey | W 109–105 | | | | Brendan Byrne Arena | 9–8 |
| 18 | December 11, 1993 | Cleveland | W 93–84 | | | | Chicago Stadium | 10–8 |
| 19 | December 15, 1993 | @ Boston | W 108–98 | | | | Boston Garden | 11–8 |
| 20 | December 17, 1993 | New York | W 98–86 | | | | Chicago Stadium | 12–8 |
| 21 | December 18, 1993 | San Antonio | W 102–90 | | | | Chicago Stadium | 13–8 |
| 22 | December 20, 1993 | Charlotte | W 109–97 | | | | Chicago Stadium | 14–8 |
| 23 | December 22, 1993 | Minnesota | W 106–98 | | | | Chicago Stadium | 15–8 |
| 24 | December 23, 1993 | @ Detroit | W 81–72 | | | | The Palace of Auburn Hills | 16–8 |
| 25 | December 25, 1993 | Orlando | W 95–93 | | | | Chicago Stadium | 17–8 |
| 26 | December 29, 1993 | New Jersey | W 94–86 | | | | Chicago Stadium | 18–8 |
| 27 | December 30, 1993 | @ Charlotte | L 95–115 | | | | Charlotte Coliseum | 18–9 |

January: 11–3 (home: 8–0; road: 3–3)

| Game | Date | Team | Score | High points | High rebounds | High assists | Location Attendance | Record |
|---|---|---|---|---|---|---|---|---|
| 28 | January 4, 1994 | Detroit | W 97–91 | | | | Chicago Stadium | 19–9 |
| 29 | January 5, 1994 | @ Orlando | L 90–105 | | | | Orlando Arena | 19–10 |
| 30 | January 7, 1994 | @ Washington | W 99–92 | | | | USAir Arena | 20–10 |
| 31 | January 8, 1994 | Dallas | W 100–81 | | | | Chicago Stadium | 21–10 |
| 32 | January 12, 1994 | @ Atlanta | L 81–92 | | | | The Omni | 21–11 |
| 33 | January 14, 1994 | Utah | W 107–91 | | | | Chicago Stadium | 22–11 |
| 34 | January 15, 1994 | Houston | W 82–76 | | | | Chicago Stadium | 23–11 |
| 35 | January 17, 1994 | Philadelphia | W 121–91 | | | | Chicago Stadium | 24–11 |
| 36 | January 19, 1994 | Washington | W 84–83 | | | | Chicago Stadium | 25–11 |
| 37 | January 21, 1994 | Indiana | W 96–95 | | | | Chicago Stadium | 26–11 |
| 38 | January 22, 1994 | @ Indiana | W 90–81 | | | | Market Square Arena | 27–11 |
| 39 | January 24, 1994 | @ Detroit | W 92–86 | | | | The Palace of Auburn Hills | 28–11 |
| 40 | January 27, 1994 | @ Cleveland | L 84–100 | | | | Richfield Coliseum | 28–12 |
| 41 | January 28, 1994 | Milwaukee | W 113–96 | | | | Chicago Stadium | 29–12 |

February: 8–6 (home: 2–4; road: 6–2)

| Game | Date | Team | Score | High points | High rebounds | High assists | Location Attendance | Record |
|---|---|---|---|---|---|---|---|---|
| 42 | February 1, 1994 | @ Denver | W 118–98 | | | | McNichols Sports Arena | 30–12 |
| 43 | February 3, 1994 | @ Utah | W 94–85 | | | | Delta Center | 31–12 |
| 44 | February 4, 1994 | @ Golden State | W 101–99 | | | | Oakland-Alameda County Coliseum Arena | 32–12 |
| 45 | February 6, 1994 | @ Phoenix | L 88–89 | | | | America West Arena | 32–13 |
| 46 | February 8, 1994 | @ L.A. Clippers | W 118–89 | | | | Los Angeles Memorial Sports Arena | 33–13 |
| 47 | February 10, 1994 | @ Milwaukee | W 97–80 | | | | Bradley Center | 34–13 |
All-Star Break
| 48 | February 16, 1994 | Miami | L 101–109 | | | | Chicago Stadium | 34–14 |
| 49 | February 18, 1994 | Denver | L 84–109 | | | | Chicago Stadium | 34–15 |
| 50 | February 20, 1994 | @ New York | L 68–86 | | | | Madison Square Garden | 34–16 |
| 51 | February 21, 1994 | Charlotte | W 118–93 | | | | Chicago Stadium | 35–16 |
| 52 | February 23, 1994 | Golden State | W 123–100 | | | | Chicago Stadium | 36–16 |
| 53 | February 25, 1994 | @ Washington | W 114–88 | | | | USAir Arena | 37–16 |
| 54 | February 26, 1994 | Indiana | L 86–96 | | | | Chicago Stadium | 37–17 |
| 55 | February 28, 1994 | Cleveland | L 81–89 | | | | Chicago Stadium | 37–18 |

March: 9–6 (home: 6–2; road: 3–4)

| Game | Date | Team | Score | High points | High rebounds | High assists | Location Attendance | Record |
|---|---|---|---|---|---|---|---|---|
| 56 | March 2, 1994 | L.A. Lakers | L 89–97 | | | | Chicago Stadium | 37–19 |
| 57 | March 4, 1994 | Portland | L 96–115 | | | | Chicago Stadium | 37–20 |
| 58 | March 6, 1994 | @ Cleveland | L 95–99 | | | | Richfield Coliseum | 37–21 |
| 59 | March 8, 1994 | Atlanta | W 116–95 | | | | Chicago Stadium | 38–21 |
| 60 | March 11, 1994 | @ Atlanta | L 77–108 | | | | The Omni | 38–22 |
| 61 | March 12, 1994 | Sacramento | W 111–94 | | | | Chicago Stadium | 39–22 |
| 62 | March 15, 1994 | Orlando | W 108–98 | | | | Chicago Stadium | 40–22 |
| 63 | March 16, 1994 | @ Boston | W 101–100 | | | | Boston Garden | 41–22 |
| 64 | March 18, 1994 | Seattle | W 87–84 | | | | Chicago Stadium | 42–22 |
| 65 | March 20, 1994 | @ Minnesota | W 90–80 | | | | Target Center | 43–22 |
| 66 | March 22, 1994 | @ New York | L 78–87 | | | | Madison Square Garden | 43–23 |
| 67 | March 23, 1994 | @ Philadelphia | W 99–87 | | | | The Spectrum | 44–23 |
| 68 | March 25, 1994 | @ New Jersey | L 87–110 | | | | Brendan Byrne Arena | 44–24 |
| 69 | March 26, 1994 | Indiana | W 90–88 | | | | Chicago Stadium | 45–24 |
| 70 | March 29, 1994 | Philadelphia | W 106–103 | | | | Chicago Stadium | 46–24 |

April: 9–3 (home: 5–2; road: 4–1)

| Game | Date | Team | Score | High points | High rebounds | High assists | Location Attendance | Record |
|---|---|---|---|---|---|---|---|---|
| 71 | April 1, 1994 | Detroit | W 102–95 | | | | Chicago Stadium | 47–24 |
| 72 | April 3, 1994 | @ Detroit | W 96–93 | | | | The Palace of Auburn Hills | 48–24 |
| 73 | April 5, 1994 | Washington | W 114–88 | | | | Chicago Stadium | 49–24 |
| 74 | April 8, 1994 | @ Indiana | W 100–94 | | | | Market Square Arena | 50–24 |
| 75 | April 9, 1994 | Milwaukee | W 125–99 | | | | Chicago Stadium | 51–24 |
| 76 | April 12, 1994 | New Jersey | W 111–105 | | | | Chicago Stadium | 52–24 |
| 77 | April 13, 1994 | @ Miami | W 96–90 | | | | Miami Arena | 53–24 |
| 78 | April 15, 1994 | @ Charlotte | W 88–85 | | | | Charlotte Coliseum | 54–24 |
| 79 | April 17, 1994 | @ Orlando | L 101–118 | | | | Orlando Arena | 54–25 |
| 80 | April 18, 1994 | Atlanta | W 87–70 | | | | Chicago Stadium | 55–25 |
| 81 | April 22, 1994 | Boston | L 94–104 (2OT) | | | | Chicago Stadium | 55–26 |
| 82 | April 24, 1994 | New York | L 76–92 | | | | Chicago Stadium | 55–27 |

1993–94 schedule

== Playoffs ==
1994 playoff game log
First Round: 3–0 (home: 2–0; road: 1–0)

| Game | Date | Team | Score | High points | High rebounds | High assists | Location Attendance | Series |
|---|---|---|---|---|---|---|---|---|
| 1 | April 29, 1994 | Cleveland | W 104–96 | Scottie Pippen (31) | Scottie Pippen (12) | Peter Myers (6) | Chicago Stadium; 18,676 | 1–0 |
| 2 | May 1, 1994 | Cleveland | W 105–96 | Scottie Pippen (22) | Horace Grant (12) | Toni Kukoč (11) | Chicago Stadium; 18,676 | 2–0 |
| 3 | May 3, 1994 | @ Cleveland | W 95–92 (OT) | Scottie Pippen (23) | Scottie Pippen (11) | Scottie Pippen (6) | Richfield Coliseum; 17,778 | 3–0 |

Conference semifinals: 3–4 (home: 3–0; road: 0–4)

| Game | Date | Team | Score | High points | High rebounds | High assists | Location Attendance | Series |
|---|---|---|---|---|---|---|---|---|
| 1 | May 8, 1994 | @ New York | L 86–90 | Scottie Pippen (24) | Luc Longley (8) | Scottie Pippen (7) | Madison Square Garden; 19,763 | 0–1 |
| 2 | May 11, 1994 | @ New York | L 91–96 | Grant, Armstrong (23) | Bill Cartwright (10) | B. J. Armstrong (6) | Madison Square Garden; 19,763 | 0–2 |
| 3 | May 13, 1994 | New York | W 104–102 | Scottie Pippen (25) | Horace Grant (8) | Horace Grant (6) | Chicago Stadium; 18,676 | 1–2 |
| 4 | May 15, 1994 | New York | W 95–83 | Scottie Pippen (25) | Scottie Pippen (8) | Pippen, Kukoč (6) | Chicago Stadium; 18,676 | 2–2 |
| 5 | May 18, 1994 | @ New York | L 86–87 | Scottie Pippen (23) | three players tied (6) | three players tied (4) | Madison Square Garden; 19,763 | 2–3 |
| 6 | May 20, 1994 | New York | W 93–79 | B. J. Armstrong (20) | Horace Grant (12) | Scottie Pippen (6) | Chicago Stadium; 18,676 | 3–3 |
| 7 | May 22, 1994 | @ New York | L 77–87 | Scottie Pippen (20) | Scottie Pippen (16) | Scottie Pippen (5) | Madison Square Garden; 19,763 | 3–4 |

1994 schedule

== Player statistics ==
Legend
| GP | Games played | GS | Games started | MPG | Minutes per game |
| FG% | Field-goal percentage | 3P% | 3-point field-goal percentage | FT% | Free-throw percentage |
| RPG | Rebounds per game | APG | Assists per game | SPG | Steals per game |
| BPG | Blocks per game | PPG | Points per game |

=== Season ===
| Player | GP | GS | MPG | FG% | 3P% | FT% | RPG | APG | SPG | BPG | PPG |
|---|---|---|---|---|---|---|---|---|---|---|---|
| B.J. Armstrong | 82 | 82 | 33.8 | .476 | .444 | .855 | 2.1 | 3.9 | 1.0 | 0.1 | 14.8 |
| Corie Blount | 67 | 8 | 10.3 | .437 | .000 | .613 | 2.9 | 0.8 | 0.3 | 0.5 | 3.0 |
| Bill Cartwright | 42 | 41 | 18.6 | .513 | .000 | .684 | 3.6 | 1.4 | 0.2 | 0.2 | 5.6 |
| Jo Jo English | 36 | 0 | 11.6 | .434 | .471 | .476 | 1.3 | 1.1 | 0.2 | 0.3 | 3.6 |
| Horace Grant | 70 | 69 | 36.7 | .524 | .000 | .596 | 11.0 | 3.4 | 1.1 | 1.2 | 15.1 |
| Dave Johnson | 17 | 0 | 7 | .315 | .000 | .619 | 0.9 | 0.2 | 0.2 | 0 | 2.8 |
| Steve Kerr | 82 | 0 | 24.8 | .497 | .419 | .856 | 1.6 | 2.6 | 0.9 | 0 | 8.6 |
| Stacey King | 31 | 15 | 17.3 | .398 | .000 | .679 | 4.3 | 1.3 | 0.6 | 0.4 | 5.5 |
| Toni Kukoč | 75 | 8 | 24.1 | .431 | .271 | .743 | 4 | 3.4 | 1.1 | 0.4 | 10.9 |
| Luc Longley | 27 | 17 | 19 | .483 | .000 | .756 | 5.1 | 2.3 | 0.4 | 0.8 | 7.6 |
| Pete Myers | 82 | 81 | 24.8 | .455 | .276 | .701 | 2.2 | 3 | 1 | 0.2 | 7.9 |
| John Paxson | 27 | 0 | 12.7 | .441 | .409 | .5 | 0.7 | 1.2 | 0.3 | 0.1 | 2.6 |
| Will Perdue | 43 | 6 | 9.2 | .42 | .000 | .719 | 2.9 | 0.8 | 0.2 | 0.3 | 2.7 |
| Scottie Pippen | 72 | 72 | 38.3 | .491 | .32 | .66 | 8.7 | 5.6 | 2.9 | 0.8 | 22.0 |
| Bill Wennington | 76 | 0 | 18 | .488 | .000 | .818 | 4.6 | 0.9 | 0.6 | 0.4 | 7.1 |
| Scott Williams | 38 | 11 | 16.8 | .483 | .2 | .612 | 4.8 | 1 | 0.4 | 0.6 | 7.6 |

=== Playoffs ===
| Player | GP | GS | MPG | FG% | 3P% | FT% | RPG | APG | SPG | BPG | PPG |
|---|---|---|---|---|---|---|---|---|---|---|---|
| B.J. Armstrong | 10 | 10 | 36 | .519 | .583 | .818 | 2.4 | 2.5 | 0.8 | 0 | 15.3 |
| Bill Cartwright | 9 | 8 | 21 | .326 | .000 | .813 | 4.9 | 1.2 | 0.3 | 0.2 | 4.6 |
| Jo Jo English | 7 | 0 | 8.3 | .417 | .25 | .500 | 0.4 | 0.3 | 0.1 | 0.1 | 2.0 |
| Horace Grant | 10 | 10 | 39.3 | .542 | 1.000 | .738 | 7.4 | 2.6 | 1 | 1.8 | 16.2 |
| Steve Kerr | 10 | 0 | 18.6 | .361 | .375 | 1.000 | 1.4 | 1.0 | 0.7 | 0.0 | 3.5 |
| Toni Kukoč | 10 | 0 | 19.4 | .448 | .421 | .735 | 4 | 3.6 | 0.5 | 0.3 | 9.3 |
| Luc Longley | 10 | 2 | 17 | .500 | .000 | .722 | 4.5 | 1.8 | 0.6 | 0.8 | 3.3 |
| Pete Myers | 10 | 10 | 23.5 | .518 | .000 | .571 | 1.9 | 2.8 | 0.8 | 0.4 | 7.0 |
| John Paxson | 9 | 0 | 6.4 | .429 | .000 | N/A | 0.1 | 0.6 | 0.2 | 0.0 | 0.7 |
| Scottie Pippen | 10 | 10 | 38.4 | .434 | .267 | .885 | 8.3 | 4.6 | 2.4 | 0.7 | 22.8 |
| Bill Wennington | 7 | 0 | 6.7 | .500 | .000 | .667 | 1.0 | 0.6 | 0.0 | 0.1 | 1.1 |
| Scott Williams | 10 | 0 | 15.1 | .421 | .000 | .714 | 3.9 | 0.7 | 0.7 | 0.3 | 6.3 |

Player statistics citation:

== Awards and records ==
- Scottie Pippen, NBA All-Star Game Most Valuable Player Award
- Scottie Pippen, All-NBA First Team
- Scottie Pippen, NBA All-Defensive First Team
- Horace Grant, NBA All-Defensive Second Team
- Toni Kukoč, NBA All-Rookie Team 2nd Team

=== NBA All-Star Game ===
- Scottie Pippen, Forward
- B. J. Armstrong, Guard
- Horace Grant, Forward
