= Pete Myers =

American basketball player and coach

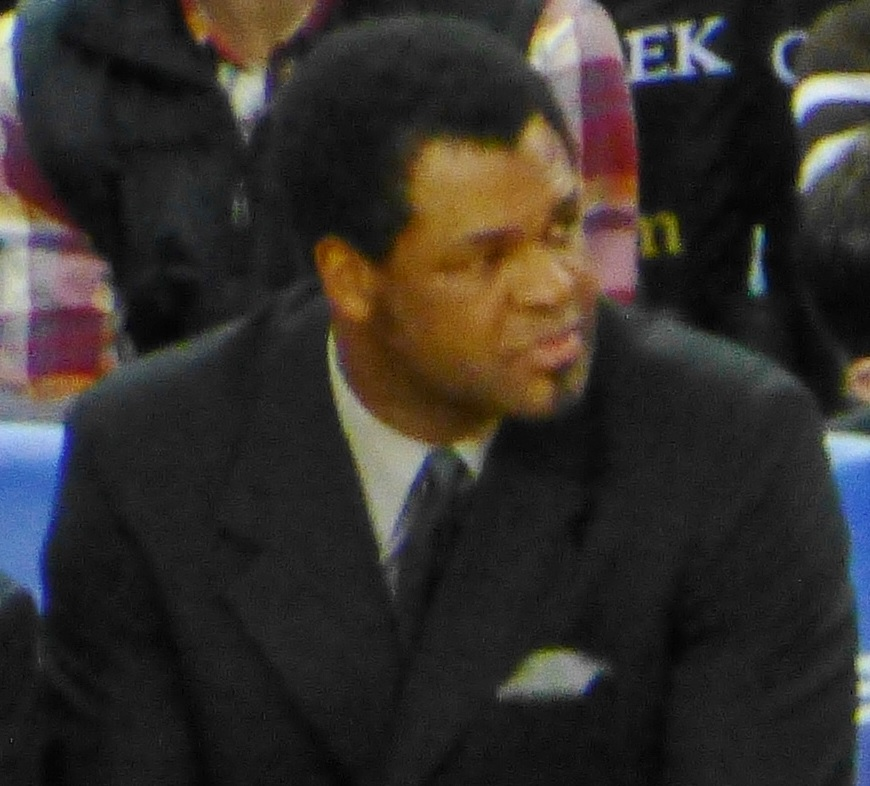
- Myers in 2013

Personal information
- Born: September 15, 1963 (age 63) Mobile, Alabama, U.S.
- Listed height: 6 ft 6 in (1.98 m)
- Listed weight: 180 lb (82 kg)

Career information
- High school: Williamson (Mobile, Alabama)
- College: Faulkner State CC (1981–1983); Little Rock (1984–1986)
- NBA draft: 1986: 6th round, 120th overall pick
- Drafted by: Chicago Bulls
- Playing career: 1986–1999
- Position: Shooting guard
- Number: 10, 9, 8, 7, 20
- Coaching career: 2001–2019

Career history

Playing
- 1986–1987: Chicago Bulls
- 1987–1988: Rockford Lightning
- 1988: San Antonio Spurs
- 1988: Philadelphia 76ers
- 1988: Zaragoza
- 1988–1990: New York Knicks
- 1990: New Jersey Nets
- 1990: San Antonio Spurs
- 1991–1992: Fortitudo Pallacanestro Bologna
- 1991: Albany Patroons
- 1992–1993: Scavolini Pesaro
- 1993–1995: Chicago Bulls
- 1995–1996: Miami Heat
- 1996: Charlotte Hornets
- 1997: Pallacanestro Cantù
- 1997–1998: New York Knicks
- 1998: Rockford Lightning
- 1999: Quad City Thunder

Coaching
- 2001–2010: Chicago Bulls (assistant)
- 2003, 2007: Chicago Bulls (interim)
- 2011–2014: Golden State Warriors (assistant)
- 2015–2019: Chicago Bulls (assistant)

Career highlights
- As player: Second-team All-CBA (1988); CBA All-Star (1988); 2× All-TAAC (1985, 1986)
- Stats at NBA.com
- Stats at Basketball Reference

Peter Eddie Myers (born September 15, 1963) is an American former professional basketball player and a former assistant coach for the National Basketball Association (NBA) team Chicago Bulls. He is most famous for having been Michael Jordan's replacement player during Jordan's stint in baseball.

== Early life and college career ==
Born in Mobile, Alabama, Myers graduated from Williamson High School of Mobile in 1981. Myers then attended Faulkner State Community College. At Faulkner State, Myers averaged nearly 14 points per game in his two-year career and was named to the 1983 All-Southern Division team. Myers transferred to the University of Arkansas at Little Rock in 1984 and played two seasons on the Arkansas–Little Rock Trojans men's basketball team. At Arkansas–Little Rock, Myers was named to the All-Trans America Athletic Conference (TAAC) team both his junior and senior years and was part of the 1986 TAAC tournament championship team that advanced to the second round of the NCAA tournament.

== Pro playing career ==
In the 1986 NBA draft, the Chicago Bulls selected Myers in the sixth round as the 120th overall pick. As a rookie, Myers played in 29 games with the Bulls and averaged 5.3 minutes and 2.3 points per game.

In 1987, Myers played for the Rockford Lightning of the CBA, was named a league All-Star, and won second place in the CBA slam dunk contest.

Myers then signed with the San Antonio Spurs in January 1988 and averaged 14.9 minutes, 5.1 points, 1.7 rebounds, and 2.2 assists in 22 games.

The Spurs traded Myers to the Philadelphia 76ers in August 1988. Controversially, Myers chose to play in the Spanish Liga ACB team Cai Zaragoza during the NBA preseason, and the 76ers sued to stop Myers. In 4 games with Zaragoza, Myers made 48.9% of field goals and averaged 12.3 points, 2.3 rebounds, and 2.8 assists. Before being waived by the 76ers on December 15, Myers played 4 games with an average 10.0 minutes, 3.5 points, 2.5 rebounds, and 0.5 assists.

On December 20, 1988, Myers signed with the New York Knicks and played 29 games with an average 7.9 minutes, 2.8 points, 0.8 rebounds, and 1.6 assists. In the 1989–90 season with the Knicks, Myers played 24 games with 8.7 minutes per game along with 1.9 points, 1.2 rebounds, and 1.5 assists.

Four days after the Knicks waived him, Myers signed with the New Jersey Nets on February 27, 1990, and played 28 games for the Nets. In those 28 games, Myers averaged 19.4 minutes, 7.1 points, 2.4 rebounds, and 3.6 assists and made 2 starts for the first starts in his NBA career.

On December 10, 1990, Myers signed as a free agent with the San Antonio Spurs and played 8 games with 1 start before being waived on December 24. Myers averaged 3.6 points, 2.3 rebounds, and 1.8 assists.

Myers then played for Fortitudo Pallacanestro Bologna (sponsorship name Aprimatic Bologna) of the Italian Lega Basket Serie A and signed with the CBA team Albany Patroons in April 1991. Myers returned to Fortitudo Bologna (new sponsorship name Mangiaebevi Bologna) after the CBA season ended.

After spending the 1992 NBA preseason with the Washington Bullets, Myers played for Scavolini Pesaro of Serie A in the 1992–1993 season. Myers averaged 16.1 points, 6.4 rebounds, and 2.1 assists per game.

Myers returned to the NBA in 1993 by signing with the Chicago Bulls and replaced the retiring Michael Jordan as starting shooting guard. Myers played all 82 regular season games for the first time in his NBA career and started 81. Myers made career-high averages of 24.8 minutes, 7.9 points, 1.0 steal, and 3.0 assists per game as well as 2.2 rebounds. The following season, Myers played 71 games with 14 starts and averaged 4.5 points, 2.0 rebounds, and 2.1 assists. On March 15, 1995, Myers scored a season-high 14 points. However, Myers faced the possibility of being replaced as Michael Jordan was considering a comeback to the NBA. Jordan returned to the NBA for the first time, replacing Myers in the Bulls starting lineup the next game: March 19, 1995, against the Indiana Pacers.

Myers signed with the Charlotte Hornets on October 3, 1995, but was traded to the Miami Heat on November 3 before playing a game for the Hornets. With the Heat, Myers started 1 of 39 games played and averaged 4.7 points, 1.9 rebounds, and 2.5 assists.

After the Heat waived him, Myers returned to the Hornets on February 16, 1996. In 32 games and 1 start, Myers averaged 2.9 points, 2.1 rebounds, and 1.5 assists.

In 1997, Myers played for Polti Cantù and reached the Italian Cup finals.

Myers then signed with the NBA's New York Knicks on October 1, 1997. In 9 games, Myers averaged 1.6 points, 1.1 rebounds, and 0.3 assist. The Knicks waived Myers on January 6, 1998. Myers then re-joined the CBA team Rockford Lightning.

In January 1999, Myers signed with CBA team Quad City Thunder. In 21 games, Myers averaged 6.4 points per game.

== Coaching career ==
Myers became a candidate for the Chicago Bulls assistant coaching staff on January 4, 2000, and joined Chicago's coaching staff on December 28, 2001. He became the interim head coach for two games when Bill Cartwright was fired in 2003. When the Bulls hired Scott Skiles, Myers went back to his regular duties at assistant coach. When Skiles was fired in 2007, Myers was named once again the interim head coach for one game before Jim Boylan became the head coach for the rest of the season. Myers' total head coaching record is 0–3.

Myers was dropped from the Bulls' coaching staff in the summer of 2010, after the arrival of new head coach Tom Thibodeau. For the 2010–11 season, Myers returned to the Bulls front office as a scout. In 2011, he became an assistant coach with the Golden State Warriors under Mark Jackson. In 2014, Myers and the rest of Jackson's staff were released by Golden State. On June 25, 2015, Myers returned to the Bulls as an assistant coach until May 23, 2019, when he departed for personal reasons.

== Career playing statistics ==
Legend
| GP | Games played | GS | Games started | MPG | Minutes per game |
| FG% | Field goal percentage | 3P% | 3-point field goal percentage | FT% | Free throw percentage |
| RPG | Rebounds per game | APG | Assists per game | SPG | Steals per game |
| BPG | Blocks per game | PPG | Points per game | **Bold** | Career high |
| * | Led the league |

=== NBA ===
Source

=== Regular season ===
| Year | Team | GP | GS | MPG | FG% | 3P% | FT% | RPG | APG | SPG | BPG | PPG |
|---|---|---|---|---|---|---|---|---|---|---|---|---|
| 1986–87 | Chicago | 29 | 0 | 5.3 | .365 | .000 | .651 | .6 | .7 | .5 | .1 | 2.3 |
| 1987–88 | San Antonio | 22 | 0 | 14.9 | .453 | .000 | .667 | 1.7 | 2.2 | .8 | .3 | 5.1 |
| 1988–89 | Philadelphia | 4 | 0 | 10.0 | **.500** | – | .500 | **2.5** | .5 | .8 | .0 | 3.5 |
| 1988–89 | New York | 29 | 0 | 7.9 | .410 | .000 | .705 | .8 | 1.6 | .6 | .1 | 2.8 |
| 1989–90 | New York | 24 | 0 | 8.7 | .333 | .000 | .516 | 1.2 | 1.5 | .6 | .1 | 1.9 |
| 1989–90 | New Jersery | 28 | 2 | 19.4 | .411 | .000 | .725 | 2.4 | **3.6** | .7 | .3 | 7.1 |
| 1990–91 | San Antonio | 8 | 1 | 12.9 | .435 | .000 | **.818** | 2.3 | 1.8 | .4 | **.4** | 3.6 |
| 1993–94 | Chicago | **82*** | **81** | **24.8** | .455 | **.276** | .701 | 2.2 | 3.0 | **1.0** | .2 | **7.9** |
| 1994–95 | Chicago | 71 | 14 | 17.9 | .415 | .256 | .614 | 2.0 | 2.1 | .8 | .2 | 4.5 |
| 1995–96 | Miami | 39 | 1 | 16.4 | .388 | .262 | .645 | 1.9 | 2.5 | .4 | .3 | 4.7 |
| 1995–96 | Charlotte | 32 | 1 | 14.2 | .333 | .188 | .674 | 2.1 | 1.5 | .6 | .2 | 2.9 |
| 1997–98 | New York | 9 | 0 | 4.4 | **.500** | – | .667 | 1.1 | .3 | .4 | .0 | 1.6 |
| Career | | 377 | 100 | 16.0 | .421 | .219 | .668 | 1.8 | 2.1 | .7 | .2 | 4.8 |

=== Playoffs ===
| Year | Team | GP | GS | MPG | FG% | 3P% | FT% | RPG | APG | SPG | BPG | PPG |
|---|---|---|---|---|---|---|---|---|---|---|---|---|
| 1987 | Chicago | 1 | 0 | 1.0 | .000 | – | – | .0 | .0 | .0 | .0 | .0 |
| 1989 | New York | 4 | 0 | 3.5 | – | – | **.667** | .8 | .3 | .0 | .3 | 1.0 |
| 1994 | Chicago | **10** | **10** | **23.5** | **.518** | .000 | .571 | **1.9** | **2.8** | **.8** | **.4** | **7.0** |
| 1995 | Chicago | 9 | 0 | 8.8 | .357 | **.500** | .333 | 1.1 | .9 | .4 | .1 | 1.4 |
| Career | | 24 | 10 | 13.7 | .479 | .167 | .545 | 1.3 | 1.5 | .5 | .3 | 3.6 |

== Head coaching record ==
Legend
| Regular season | G | Games coached | W | Games won | L | Games lost | W–L % | Win–loss % |
| Playoffs | PG | Playoff games | PW | Playoff wins | PL | Playoff losses | PW–L % | Playoff win–loss % |

| Team | Year | G | W | L | W–L% | Finish | PG | PW | PL | PW–L% | Result |
|---|---|---|---|---|---|---|---|---|---|---|---|
| Chicago | 2003–04 | 2 | 0 | 2 | .000 | (interim) | — | — | — | — | — |
| Chicago | 2007–08 | 1 | 0 | 1 | .000 | (interim) | — | — | — | — | — |
| Career | | 3 | 0 | 3 | .000 | | — | — | — | — | |
