= 1993–94 Atlanta Hawks season =

Season of National Basketball Association team the Atlanta Hawks

- Division champions
- Head coach: Lenny Wilkens
- General manager: Pete Babcock
- Owners: Ted Turner / Turner Broadcasting System
- Arena: The Omni

Results
- Record: 57–25 (.695)
- Place: Division: 1st (Central); Conference: 1st (Eastern)
- Playoff finish: Conference semifinals (lost to Pacers 2–4)
- Stats at Basketball Reference

Local media
- Television: SportSouth; TBS
- Radio: WGST

The 1993–94 Atlanta Hawks season was the 45th season for the Atlanta Hawks in the National Basketball Association, and their 26th season in Atlanta, Georgia.

== Season summary ==
=== Off-season ===
During the off-season, the Hawks hired Hall of Famer Lenny Wilkens as their new head coach; Wilkens was a star guard for the franchise when it was based in St. Louis, Missouri in the 1960s, and was quickly moving up the all-time coaching wins list after successful runs with the Seattle SuperSonics and Cleveland Cavaliers. The team also signed free agents Craig Ehlo, and Andrew Lang.

=== Regular season ===
Under Wilkens, and with the addition of Ehlo and Lang, the Hawks struggled losing four of their first five games of the regular season, but then posted a 14-game winning streak between November and December, which led to a 15–4 start to the season. The team posted a seven-game winning streak between December and January, and later on held a 34–13 record at the All-Star break. At mid-season, and despite a good record, the Hawks traded All-Star forward Dominique Wilkins to the Los Angeles Clippers in exchange for All-Star forward Danny Manning; before the trade, Wilkins averaged 24.4 points, 6.2 rebounds and 1.3 steals per game in 49 games. Despite the loss of Wilkins, and with the addition of Manning, the Hawks won seven of their final ten games of the season, and finished in first place in the Central Division with a 57–25 record, earning the first seed in the Eastern Conference; the team also posted a successful 36–5 home record at the Omni Coliseum. Lenny Wilkens was named the NBA Coach of the Year, after leading the Hawks to a 14-game improvement over the previous season.

Kevin Willis averaged 19.1 points and 12.0 rebounds per game, while Manning averaged 15.7 points, 6.5 rebounds and 1.8 steals per game in 26 games after the trade, and Stacey Augmon provided the team with 14.8 points and 1.8 steals per game. In addition, Mookie Blaylock provided with 13.8 points, 5.2 rebounds, 9.7 assists and 2.6 steals per game, led the Hawks with 114 three-point field goals, and was named to the NBA All-Defensive First Team, while Ehlo played a sixth man role off the bench, averaging 10.0 points, 3.3 assists and 1.7 steals per game. Meanwhile, Duane Ferrell contributed 7.1 points per game, Lang provided with 6.1 points, 3.8 rebounds and 1.1 blocks per game, and starting center Jon Koncak averaged 4.2 points, 4.5 rebounds and 1.5 blocks per game.

During the NBA All-Star weekend at the Target Center in Minneapolis, Minnesota, and before the mid-season trade, Wilkins and Blaylock were both selected for the 1994 NBA All-Star Game, as members of the Eastern Conference All-Star team, while Lenny Wilkens was selected to coach the Eastern Conference; it was Wilkins' ninth and final All-Star appearance, and the first and only All-Star appearance for Blaylock. Willis and Blaylock both finished tied in eleventh place in Most Valuable Player voting, while Blaylock also finished tied in seventh place in Defensive Player of the Year voting, and tied in fourth place in Most Improved Player voting, and Ehlo finished in third place in Sixth Man of the Year voting.

The Hawks finished 22nd in the NBA in home-game attendance, with an attendance of 537,547 at the Omni Coliseum during the regular season.

=== NBA playoffs ===
In the Eastern Conference First Round of the 1994 NBA playoffs, the Hawks faced off against the 8th–seeded Miami Heat, a team that featured Glen Rice, Steve Smith and Rony Seikaly. With the series tied at 1–1, the Hawks struggled and faced elimination after losing Game 3 to the Heat on the road, 90–86 at the Miami Arena, as the Heat took a 2–1 series lead. However, the Hawks managed to win the next two games, which included a Game 5 win over the Heat at home, 102–91 at the Omni Coliseum to win in a hard-fought five-game series.

In the Eastern Conference Semi-finals, the team faced off against the 5th–seeded Indiana Pacers, who were led by Reggie Miller, Rik Smits and Derrick McKey. With the series tied at 1–1, the Hawks lost the next two games to the Pacers on the road, including a Game 4 loss at the Market Square Arena, 102–86. After winning Game 5 at the Omni Coliseum, 88–76, and despite being the top–seeded team, the Hawks lost Game 6 to the Pacers at the Market Square Arena, 98–79, thus losing the series in six games.

=== Aftermath ===
Following the season, Manning signed as a free agent with the Phoenix Suns after only half a season with the Hawks, while Ferrell signed with the Indiana Pacers, and second-year forward Adam Keefe was traded to the Utah Jazz.

== Draft picks ==
Round	Pick	Player	Position	Nationality	College
1	15	Doug Edwards	SF	United States	Florida State

== Roster ==
1993–94 Atlanta Hawks roster
Players

Pos.	No.	Player	Height	Weight	DOB	From
G/F	2	Stacey Augmon	6 ft 8 in (2.03 m)	205 lb (93 kg)	1968–08–01	UNLV
G	10	Mookie Blaylock	6 ft 0 in (1.83 m)	180 lb (82 kg)	1967–03–20	Oklahoma
F	34	Doug Edwards	6 ft 7 in (2.01 m)	220 lb (100 kg)	1971–01–21	Florida State
G	3	Craig Ehlo	6 ft 6 in (1.98 m)	180 lb (82 kg)	1961–08–11	Washington State
F	33	Duane Ferrell	6 ft 7 in (2.01 m)	209 lb (95 kg)	1965–02–28	Georgia Tech
G	25	Paul Graham	6 ft 6 in (1.98 m)	200 lb (91 kg)	1967–11–28	Ohio
F	–	Roy Hinson (injured) (IN)	6 ft 9 in (2.06 m)	210 lb (95 kg)	1961–05–02	Rutgers
F	31	Adam Keefe	6 ft 9 in (2.06 m)	230 lb (104 kg)	1970–02–22	Stanford
C	32	Jon Koncak	7 ft 0 in (2.13 m)	250 lb (113 kg)	1963–05–17	SMU
C	28	Andrew Lang	6 ft 11 in (2.11 m)	245 lb (111 kg)	1966–06–28	Arkansas
F	5	Danny Manning	6 ft 10 in (2.08 m)	230 lb (104 kg)	1966–05–17	Kansas
C	41	Blair Rasmussen (injured) (IN)	7 ft 0 in (2.13 m)	250 lb (113 kg)	1962–11–13	Oregon
G	1	Ennis Whatley	6 ft 3 in (1.91 m)	177 lb (80 kg)	1962–08–11	Alabama
F/C	42	Kevin Willis	7 ft 0 in (2.13 m)	220 lb (100 kg)	1962–09–08	Michigan State

Coaches
Head coach
- Lenny Wilkens
Assistant(s)
- Dick Helm
- Brian Winters

Legend
- (DP) Unsigned draft pick
- (FA) Free agent
- (S) Suspended
- (IN) Inactive
- Injured

Roster

=== Roster Notes ===
- Power forward Roy Hinson was on the injured reserve list due to a knee injury, missed the entire regular season, and never played for the Hawks.
- Center Blair Rasmussen was on the injured reserve list due to a back injury, and missed the entire regular season.

== Regular season ==
=== Season standings ===
Central Division	W	L	PCT	GB	Home	Road	Div
y-Atlanta Hawks	57	25	.695	–	36–5	21–20	21–7
x-Chicago Bulls	55	27	.671	2	31–10	24–17	21–7
x-Indiana Pacers	47	35	.573	10	29–12	18–23	15–13
x-Cleveland Cavaliers	47	35	.573	10	31–10	16–25	16–12
Charlotte Hornets	41	41	.500	16	28–13	13–28	12–16
Detroit Pistons	20	62	.244	37	10–31	10–31	4–24
Milwaukee Bucks	20	62	.244	37	11–30	9–32	9–19

#	Eastern Conference				
#	Team	W	L	PCT	GB
1	c-Atlanta Hawks	57	25	.695	–
2	y-New York Knicks	57	25	.695	–
3	x-Chicago Bulls	55	27	.671	2
4	x-Orlando Magic	50	32	.610	7
5	x-Indiana Pacers	47	35	.573	10
6	x-Cleveland Cavaliers	47	35	.573	10
7	x-New Jersey Nets	45	37	.549	12
8	x-Miami Heat	42	40	.512	15
9	Charlotte Hornets	41	41	.500	16
10	Boston Celtics	32	50	.390	25
11	Philadelphia 76ers	25	57	.305	32
12	Washington Bullets	24	58	.293	33
13	Milwaukee Bucks	20	62	.244	37
14	Detroit Pistons	20	62	.244	37

== Game log ==
=== Regular season ===
1993–94 game log
Total: 57–25 (home: 36–5; road: 21–20)
November: 10–4 (home: 7–0; road: 3–4)

Game	Date	Team	Score	High points	High rebounds	High assists	Location Attendance	Record
1	November 5, 1993	Indiana	W 116–110				The Omni	1–0
2	November 8, 1993	@ Chicago	L 80–106				Chicago Stadium	1–1
3	November 10, 1993	@ Utah	L 88–91				Delta Center	1–2
4	November 12, 1993	@ Portland	L 84–94				Memorial Coliseum	1–3
5	November 13, 1993	@ Seattle	L 89–97 (OT)				Seattle Center Coliseum	1–4
6	November 16, 1993	Sacramento	W 118–95				The Omni	2–4
7	November 17, 1993	@ Philadelphia	W 92–90				The Spectrum	3–4
8	November 19, 1993	@ Miami	W 95–92				Miami Arena	4–4
9	November 20, 1993	Charlotte	W 96–91				The Omni	5–4
10	November 23, 1993	L.A. Lakers	W 103–93				The Omni	6–4
11	November 24, 1993	@ Milwaukee	W 89–85				Bradley Center	7–4
12	November 26, 1993	Washington	W 124–108				The Omni	8–4
13	November 27, 1993	Philadelphia	W 111–79				The Omni	9–4
14	November 30, 1993	Boston	W 122–114				The Omni	10–4

December: 9–3 (home: 4–1; road: 5–2)

Game	Date	Team	Score	High points	High rebounds	High assists	Location Attendance	Record
15	December 3, 1993	Houston	W 133–111				The Omni	11–4
16	December 8, 1993	@ Detroit	W 105–97				The Palace of Auburn Hills	12–4
17	December 9, 1993	San Antonio	W 105–95				The Omni	13–4
18	December 11, 1993	@ Washington (at Baltimore, MD)	W 116–108				Baltimore Arena	14–4
19	December 14, 1993	@ Cleveland	W 103–92				Richfield Coliseum	15–4
20	December 16, 1993	Indiana	L 81–99				The Omni	15–5
21	December 18, 1993	Denver	W 102–96				The Omni	16–5
22	December 22, 1993	@ Boston	W 108–103				Boston Garden	17–5
23	December 23, 1993	@ New York	L 75–84				Madison Square Garden	17–6
24	December 26, 1993	@ New Jersey	L 87–91				Brendan Byrne Arena	17–7
25	December 28, 1993	Detroit	W 119–101				The Omni	18–7
26	December 29, 1993	@ Orlando	W 92–90				Orlando Arena	19–7

January: 11–4 (home: 7–2; road: 4–2)

Game	Date	Team	Score	High points	High rebounds	High assists	Location Attendance	Record
27	January 4, 1994	Charlotte	W 133–94				The Omni	20–7
28	January 7, 1994	Portland	W 100–85				The Omni	21–7
29	January 8, 1994	Cleveland	W 102–89				The Omni	22–7
30	January 12, 1994	Chicago	W 92–81				The Omni	23–7
31	January 14, 1994	Dallas	W 113–96				The Omni	24–7
32	January 15, 1994	@ Indiana	L 91–94				Market Square Arena	24–8
33	January 17, 1994	Milwaukee	W 102–98				The Omni	25–8
34	January 19, 1994	Golden State	L 119–120				The Omni	25–9
35	January 21, 1994	New Jersey	L 111–113 (OT)				The Omni	25–10
36	January 22, 1994	@ Minnesota	W 98–81				Target Center	26–10
37	January 25, 1994	@ Milwaukee	W 95–90				Bradley Center	27–10
38	January 26, 1994	Phoenix	W 116–107				The Omni	28–10
39	January 28, 1994	@ Charlotte	W 117–105				Charlotte Coliseum	29–10
40	January 29, 1994	@ San Antonio	L 87–100				Alamodome	29–11
41	January 31, 1994	@ Dallas	W 90–85				Reunion Arena	30–11

February: 8–5 (home: 6–0; road: 2–5)

Game	Date	Team	Score	High points	High rebounds	High assists	Location Attendance	Record
42	February 2, 1994	Orlando	W 118–99				The Omni	31–11
43	February 4, 1994	New York	W 114–102				The Omni	32–11
44	February 5, 1994	@ Cleveland	L 93–109				Richfield Coliseum	32–12
45	February 7, 1994	Detroit	W 141–97				The Omni	32–13
46	February 9, 1994	@ Orlando	L 87–104				Orlando Arena	33–13
47	February 10, 1994	Miami	W 114–98				The Omni	34–13
All-Star Break
48	February 15, 1994	@ Houston	L 99–103				The Summit	34–14
49	February 17, 1994	@ Golden State	L 115–119				Oakland-Alameda County Coliseum Arena	34–15
50	February 18, 1994	@ L.A. Clippers	W 97–91				Los Angeles Memorial Sports Arena	35–15
51	February 20, 1994	@ Denver	L 92–97				McNichols Sports Arena	35–16
52	February 23, 1994	Seattle	W 99–92				The Omni	36–16
53	February 25, 1994	Milwaukee	W 111–100				The Omni	37–16
54	February 26, 1994	@ Philadelphia	W 118–102				The Spectrum	38–16

March: 12–4 (home: 7–2; road: 5–2)

Game	Date	Team	Score	High points	High rebounds	High assists	Location Attendance	Record
55	March 1, 1994	Minnesota	W 102–99				The Omni	39–16
56	March 3, 1994	@ Washington	W 109–98				USAir Arena	40–16
57	March 5, 1994	Indiana	W 90–88				The Omni	41–16
58	March 8, 1994	@ Chicago	L 95–116				Chicago Stadium	41–17
59	March 9, 1994	New York	L 83–90				The Omni	41–18
60	March 11, 1994	Chicago	W 108–77				The Omni	42–18
61	March 12, 1994	@ Detroit	W 104–92				The Palace of Auburn Hills	43–18
62	March 16, 1994	@ Charlotte	L 79–92				Charlotte Coliseum	43–19
63	March 18, 1994	@ Indiana	W 81–78				Market Square Arena	44–19
64	March 20, 1994	@ Boston	W 101–80				Boston Garden	45–19
65	March 21, 1994	Utah	W 100–96 (OT)				The Omni	46–19
66	March 23, 1994	Charlotte	W 100–92				The Omni	47–19
67	March 25, 1994	L.A. Clippers	L 94–97				The Omni	47–20
68	March 26, 1994	Miami	W 100–90				The Omni	48–20
69	March 29, 1994	New Jersey	W 101–98				The Omni	49–20
70	March 31, 1994	@ Sacramento	W 106–102				ARCO Arena	50–20

April: 7–5 (home: 5–0; road: 2–5)

Game	Date	Team	Score	High points	High rebounds	High assists	Location Attendance	Record
71	April 1, 1994	@ Phoenix	L 87–93				America West Arena	50–21
72	April 3, 1994	@ L.A. Lakers	L 89–102				Great Western Forum	50–22
73	April 6, 1994	Boston	W 111–107				The Omni	51–22
74	April 7, 1994	@ New Jersey	L 87–93				Brendan Byrne Arena	51–23
75	April 9, 1994	Washington	W 117–103				The Omni	52–23
76	April 13, 1994	Cleveland	W 110–95				The Omni	53–23
77	April 15, 1994	@ Milwaukee	W 105–96				Bradley Center	54–23
78	April 16, 1994	Philadelphia	W 123–94				The Omni	55–23
79	April 18, 1994	@ Chicago	L 70–87				Chicago Stadium	55–24
80	April 19, 1994	@ New York	W 87–84				Madison Square Garden	56–24
81	April 21, 1994	@ Miami	L 89–94				Miami Arena	56–25
82	April 23, 1994	Orlando	W 93–89				The Omni	57–25

1993–94 schedule

== Playoffs ==
Entering the playoffs, the Hawks struggled, as they needed the full five games to get past the Miami Heat in the Eastern Conference quarterfinals. In the Eastern Conference semifinals, the Hawks were upset by the Indiana Pacers in 6 games.

1994 playoff game log
First Round: 3–2 (home: 2–1; road: 1–1)

Game	Date	Team	Score	High points	High rebounds	High assists	Location Attendance	Series
1	April 28, 1994	Miami	L 88–93	Kevin Willis (17)	Kevin Willis (16)	Mookie Blaylock (9)	The Omni; 11,543	0–1
2	April 30, 1994	Miami	W 104–86	Danny Manning (20)	Kevin Willis (14)	Mookie Blaylock (8)	The Omni; 16,368	1–1
3	May 3, 1994	@ Miami	L 86–90	Craig Ehlo (20)	Kevin Willis (13)	Danny Manning (8)	Miami Arena; 15,200	1–2
4	May 5, 1994	@ Miami	W 103–89	Mookie Blaylock (29)	Kevin Willis (14)	Mookie Blaylock (7)	Miami Arena; 15,200	2–2
5	May 8, 1994	Miami	W 102–91	Kevin Willis (24)	Kevin Willis (12)	Mookie Blaylock (18)	The Omni; 14,472	3–2

Conference semifinals: 2–4 (home: 2–1; road: 0–3)

Game	Date	Team	Score	High points	High rebounds	High assists	Location Attendance	Series
1	May 10, 1994	Indiana	L 85–96	Danny Manning (21)	Kevin Willis (10)	Mookie Blaylock (8)	The Omni; 13,190	0–1
2	May 12, 1994	Indiana	W 92–69	Manning, Willis (20)	Kevin Willis (15)	Mookie Blaylock (13)	The Omni; 15,854	1–1
3	May 14, 1994	@ Indiana	L 81–101	Kevin Willis (14)	Willis, Manning (10)	Mookie Blaylock (7)	Market Square Arena; 16,545	1–2
4	May 15, 1994	@ Indiana	L 86–102	Danny Manning (35)	Andrew Lang (8)	Blaylock, Ehlo (5)	Market Square Arena; 16,561	1–3
5	May 17, 1994	Indiana	W 88–76	Craig Ehlo (22)	Mookie Blaylock (10)	Mookie Blaylock (13)	The Omni; 14,849	2–3
6	May 19, 1994	@ Indiana	L 79–98	Mookie Blaylock (23)	Danny Manning (10)	three players tied (4)	Market Square Arena; 16,552	2–4

1994 schedule

== Player statistics ==
=== Legend ===
- GP: Games played
- GS: Games started
- MPG: Minutes per game
- FG%: Field goal percentage
- 3FG%: 3-point field goal percentage
- FT%: Free throw percentage
- RPG: Rebounds per game
- APG: Assists per game
- SPG: Steals per game
- BPG: Blocks per game
- PPG: Points per game

=== Season ===
Player	GP	GS	MPG	FG%	3P%	FT%	RPG	APG	SPG	BPG	PPG
Stacey Augmon	82	82	31.8	.510	.143	.764	4.8	2.3	1.8	0.5	14.8
John Bagley	3	0	4.3	.000	N/A	1.000	0.3	1.0	0.0	0.0	0.7
Mookie Blaylock	81	81	36.0	.411	.334	.730	5.2	9.7	2.6	0.5	13.8
Doug Edwards	16	0	6.7	.347	.000	.563	1.1	0.5	0.1	0.3	2.7
Craig Ehlo	82	0	26.2	.446	.348	.727	3.4	3.3	1.7	0.3	10.0
Duane Ferrell	72	13	16.0	.485	.111	.783	1.8	0.9	0.6	0.2	7.1
Ricky Grace	3	0	2.7	.667	N/A	.000	0.3	0.3	0.0	0.0	1.3
Paul Graham	21	0	6.1	.368	.231	.765	0.6	0.6	0.2	0.2	2.8
Adam Keefe	63	1	12.1	.451	N/A	.730	3.2	0.5	0.3	0.1	4.3
Jon Koncak	82	78	22.2	.431	.000	.667	4.5	1.2	0.8	1.5	4.2
Andrew Lang	82	0	19.6	.469	.250	.689	3.8	0.6	0.5	1.1	6.1
Danny Manning	26	25	35.6	.476	.333	.651	6.5	3.3	1.8	1.0	15.7
Ennis Whatley	82	1	12.2	.508	.000	.788	1.2	2.2	0.7	0.0	3.6
Dominique Wilkins	49	49	34.4	.432	.308	.854	6.2	2.3	1.3	0.4	24.4
Kevin Willis	80	80	35.8	.499	.375	.713	12.0	1.9	1.0	0.5	19.1

=== Playoffs ===
Player	GP	GS	MPG	FG%	3P%	FT%	RPG	APG	SPG	BPG	PPG
Stacey Augmon	11	11	29.5	.517	N/A	.711	2.6	2.5	0.6	0.2	10.8
Mookie Blaylock	11	11	37.7	.340	.344	.833	5.0	8.9	2.2	0.5	13.0
Doug Edwards	1	0	3.0	N/A	N/A	N/A	0.0	0.0	0.0	1.0	0.0
Craig Ehlo	11	0	28.8	.424	.348	.708	2.7	3.6	1.0	0.0	11.4
Duane Ferrell	11	0	17.0	.397	.250	.750	2.8	1.5	0.5	0.3	7.1
Paul Graham	1	0	2.0	.500	.000	N/A	0.0	0.0	0.0	0.0	2.0
Adam Keefe	7	0	8.9	.600	N/A	.444	1.9	0.3	0.1	0.1	2.3
Jon Koncak	11	11	17.7	.409	N/A	.400	2.7	1.2	0.5	1.1	5.3
Andrew Lang	11	0	21.3	.460	.000	.773	4.3	0.5	0.5	1.8	6.8
Danny Manning	11	11	38.7	.488	N/A	.788	7.0	3.4	1.4	0.8	20.0
Ennis Whatley	11	0	10.3	.321	N/A	.750	1.3	1.1	0.6	0.0	2.2
Kevin Willis	11	11	32.9	.457	.000	.762	10.8	1.0	0.7	0.5	12.2

Player statistics citation:

== Awards and records ==
=== Awards ===
- Lenny Wilkens, NBA Coach of the Year
- Mookie Blaylock, NBA All-Defensive First Team

== Transactions ==
=== Trades ===
- February 24, 1994: Traded Dominique Wilkins and a 1994 first round draft pick to the Los Angeles Clippers for Danny Manning.
- June 22, 1994: Traded Roy Hinson (unrostered) to the Milwaukee Bucks for Ken Norman.

=== Free agents ===
==== Additions ====
Player	Signed	Former team
Craig Ehlo	July 2	Cleveland Cavaliers
Andrew Lang (basketball)	September 7	Philadelphia 76ers

==== Subtractions ====
Player	Left	New team
Travis Mays	July 1	N/A

Player Transactions Citation:

== See also ==
- 1993-94 NBA season
