= Haywoode Workman =

American basketball player and referee

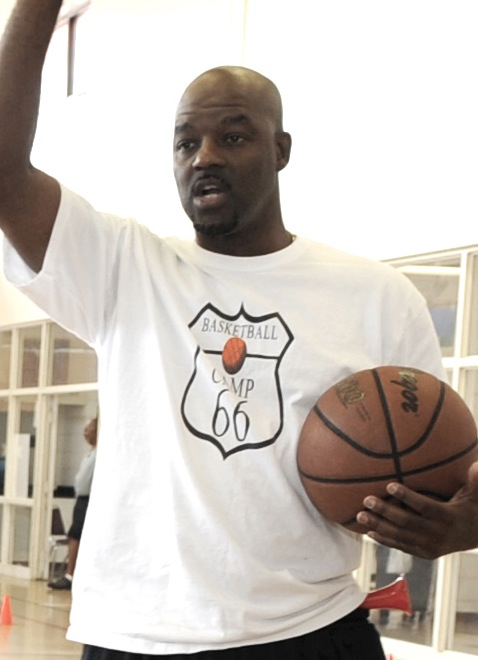
- Workman in 2009

Personal information
- Born: January 23, 1966 (age 60) Charlotte, North Carolina, U.S.
- Listed height: 6 ft 2 in (1.88 m)
- Listed weight: 180 lb (82 kg)

Career information
- High school: Myers Park (Charlotte, North Carolina)
- College: Winston-Salem State (1984–1985); Oral Roberts (1986–1989)
- NBA draft: 1989: 2nd round, 49th overall pick
- Drafted by: Atlanta Hawks
- Playing career: 1989–2001
- Position: Point guard
- Number: 14, 3
- Officiating career: 2004–present

Career history
- 1989: Atlanta Hawks
- 1989–1990: Topeka Sizzlers
- 1990–1991: Washington Bullets
- 1991–1993: Scavolini Pesaro
- 1993–1999: Indiana Pacers
- 1999–2000: Milwaukee Bucks
- 2000: Toronto Raptors
- 2000–2001: Hapoel Jerusalem

Career highlights
- CBA All-Rookie Team (1990)
- Stats at NBA.com
- Stats at Basketball Reference

Haywoode Wilvon Workman (born January 23, 1966) is an American former basketball player who is a referee in the National Basketball Association (NBA).

He played the point guard position at 6'2", and played 359 games in eight NBA seasons for five teams from 1989 to 2000 (averaging 5.5 points, 3.9 assists, 2.3 rebounds and 1 steal in 20.1 minutes per game). He also appeared in 41 career NBA playoff games, averaging 5.9 points, 4.2 assists and 2.2 rebounds per game.

== College ==
Workman attended Winston-Salem State University for one year (1984/85) before transferring to Oral Roberts University for three seasons (1986/87-1988/89; missing the 1985/86 season as a transfer student). Oral Roberts went 27–52 during Workman's tenure, where he posted career averages of 17.7 points, 5.2 rebounds, 4.3 assists, and 2.9 steals. Workman's most memorable college performance came in December 1988 when he scored a career high 42 points (18 from 3-pointers and 15 from FTs) against the sixth-ranked Oklahoma Sooners featuring Mookie Blaylock and Stacey King; Oklahoma won 152–122. In his junior year, Workman was named Honorable Mention All-American. Workman remains 8th on the school's all-time points scored list, 5th in total free-throws made, and 10th in total assists. He also has the records for most steals in a game, in a season, and in a career at Oral Roberts. He is a member of the Oral Roberts Hall of Fame.

=== College statistics ===
Legend
GP	Games played	GS	Games started	MPG	Minutes per game
FG%	Field goal percentage	3P%	3-point field goal percentage	FT%	Free throw percentage
RPG	Rebounds per game	APG	Assists per game	SPG	Steals per game
BPG	Blocks per game	PPG	Points per game	**Bold**	Career high

Year	Team	GP	GS	MPG	FG%	3P%	FT%	RPG	APG	SPG	BPG	PPG
1986–87	Oral Roberts	28	**28**	**38.8**	.365	.286	.796	3.3	**6.7**	1.9	**0.1**	13.8
1987–88	Oral Roberts	**29**	**28**	34.1	.415	.282	.755	6.0	2.7	**3.6**	**0.1**	19.4
1988–89	Oral Roberts	28	26	35.0	**.483**	**.366**	**.815**	**6.1**	3.9	3.3	**0.1**	**19.9**
Career		85	82	35.9	.425	.310	.788	5.2	4.4	2.9	0.1	17.7

== Professional career ==
Workman was selected 22nd in the second round (49th overall) in the 1989 NBA Draft. Unfortunately for Workman, the Hawks cut him six games into the season, opting for the services of Sedric Toney in backing up Doc Rivers and Spud Webb at the point. Workman would go on to play for the Topeka Sizzlers of the CBA, where he was named to the 1989–90 CBA All-Rookie Team after averaging 17.1 ppg, 4.6 apg and 4.3 apg in 46 games. He then went back to the Hawks for a 10-day contract, and then to the Illinois Express of the World Basketball League (WBL).

In August 1990, the Bullets invited Workman to rookie camp. However, he was pulled from the court after a day and a half. As the Express were preparing for the WBL playoffs, which extended into August, Workman went AWOL to try out with the Bullets. WBL president Steve Erhardt insisted that Workman had to retire from the WBL to participate in camp and was threatening to sue. Eventually Workman paid a fine and never returned to the WBL.

Workman made the full Bullets training camp at Bowie State and fought with Tony Harris and Larry Robinson for a spot on the team, while Darrell Walker, Steve Colter and second-round draft pick A. J. English were already in the fold at the guard position. With the absence of Eackles, Colter, the backup point in the previous season, was asked to play more shooting guard. Darrell Walker was also experiencing tendinitis in his Achilles tendon. Ultimately, Harris was cut and Colter, who was at odds with Washington head coach Wes Unseld, was shipped to the Sacramento Kings in exchange for Byron Irvin, who was more adept at playing two guard. Both Workman and Robinson would start the first two games of the season at the guard positions. When Walker, who actually played 58 total minutes between games 1 and 2, was inserted back into the starting lineup for game 3, Workman went to the bench and Robinson continued to start for the next seven games. However, Workman had impressed enough, so when Ledell Eackles finally signed and returned to the court in November, Robinson was released.

Fresh off a five-game losing streak in mid-November, Unseld went with the starting lineup of Darrell Walker and Haywoode Workman, and it paid off. Workman scored 14 points and hit a game winner with 3.1 seconds left to beat Reggie Miller and the Indiana Pacers at the Capital Centre, putting a temporary halt to mounting losses. In the end, Haywoode Workman appeared in 73 games for the Bullets, starting 56 of them (he missed nine games in February because of a pulled groin). For the season, he averaged 8.0 points, 4.8 assists (2nd on the team), 3.3 rebounds, and 1.2 steals per game (tied for 1st on the team). In his starts, he averaged 9.2 points and 5.4 assists.

Before the following 1991–92 season, Workman signed a two-year, $400K+ per contract with Italian League champion Scavolini Pesaro, which came with the perks of a BMW and a house on the Adriatic Coast. The Bullets gave Workman a qualifying offer of the $120,000 minimum, which could have been a non-guaranteed $250,000 if he made the team. But the writing was on the wall as the Bullets traded for Michael Adams and drafted LaBradford Smith that summer. Workman averaged 15.0 ppg, 4.6 rpg and 1.8 apg in 58 career games in the Italian League.

After two years in Italy, he returned to the NBA in 1993 by signing with the Indiana Pacers. He started 52 games for the Indiana Pacers in the 1993–94 season, averaging almost eight points and 6.2 assists during the Pacers' first trip to the Eastern Conference finals that year. He notched a playoffs career-high 11 assists, and a Pacers' playoff record seven steals, against the Orlando Magic in Game 1 of the 1994 Eastern Conference first round. Despite the Pacers trading in the summer of 1994 for a more experienced point guard in Mark Jackson, Workman, along with players such as Antonio Davis, Sam Mitchell, and Dale Davis became invaluable to the Pacers' depth and was integral to the team's consistent post-season success in the mid to late nineties. However, on November 9, 1996, in a game against Washington Bullets he suffered a torn anterior cruciate ligament in his left knee, due to which he missed the remainder of the 1996/97 season (he underwent surgery on November 22) and the entire 1997/98 season. This injury derailed the remainder of his playing career.

Workman finished off his career by playing his final two seasons with the Milwaukee Bucks and Toronto Raptors. He had his best game as a Raptor when he posted team-highs of 19 points (4–8 FG, 10–12 FT), 8 assists and 7 rebounds in a 94–85 victory over the Minnesota Timberwolves on 3 March 1999. He also spent time playing for Hapoel Jerusalem in Israel, before calling an end to his basketball playing career.

== NBA career statistics ==
Legend
GP	Games played	GS	Games started	MPG	Minutes per game
FG%	Field goal percentage	3P%	3-point field goal percentage	FT%	Free throw percentage
RPG	Rebounds per game	APG	Assists per game	SPG	Steals per game
BPG	Blocks per game	PPG	Points per game	**Bold**	Career high

=== Regular season ===
Year	Team	GP	GS	MPG	FG%	3P%	FT%	RPG	APG	SPG	BPG	PPG
1989–90	Atlanta	6	0	2.7	**.667**	.000	**1.000**	0.5	0.3	0.5	0.0	1.0
1990–91	Washington	73	**56**	27.9	.454	.240	.759	3.3	4.8	1.2	**0.1**	**8.0**
1993–94	Indiana	65	52	26.4	.424	.321	.802	3.1	**6.2**	**1.3**	**0.1**	7.7
1994–95	Indiana	69	14	14.9	.375	.357	.743	1.6	2.8	0.9	**0.1**	4.2
1995–96	Indiana	**77**	4	15.1	.390	.324	.740	1.6	2.8	0.8	**0.1**	3.6
1996–97	Indiana	4	2	20.3	.550	.000	.000	1.8	2.8	0.8	0.0	5.5
1998–99	Milwaukee	29	29	**28.1**	.429	.362	.787	**3.5**	5.9	1.1	0.0	6.9
1999–00	Milwaukee	23	1	10.8	.371	**.379**	.692	0.7	1.9	0.5	0.0	2.9
1999–00	Toronto	13	1	7.8	.286	.214	.500	0.7	1.3	0.7	0.0	1.5
Career		359	159	20.1	.419	.323	.764	2.3	3.9	1.0	0.1	5.5

=== Playoffs ===
Year	Team	GP	GS	MPG	FG%	3P%	FT%	RPG	APG	SPG	BPG	PPG
1993–94	Indiana	16	**15**	**31.9**	.344	.286	.842	**3.2**	**7.0**	**1.8**	**0.1**	**8.0**
1994–95	Indiana	**17**	0	16.2	.358	.111	.844	1.6	2.6	0.6	0.0	4.5
1995–96	Indiana	5	0	10.6	**.438**	**.600**	**1.000**	0.6	0.4	0.4	0.0	3.8
1998–99	Milwaukee	3	0	17.7	.364	.000	.833	1.0	2.3	1.0	0.0	4.3
Career		41	15	21.8	.356	.234	.846	2.1	4.0	1.1	0.0	5.8

== Officiating ==
While working out in Florida in the summer of 2001, he ran into NBA referee Bob Delaney, who asked him about trying to become a referee. There, he started refereeing local games and became involved with the Tampa Bay Pro-Am league. He started in California in 2002, working the pro-am leagues at Venice Beach and West Los Angeles out of his own pocket. Encouraged, he responded quickly by sending his resume when he heard the CBA was looking for new officials. He worked 15 games that CBA season and later worked the pre-draft camp in Chicago. In July 2003, he worked the NBA summer league in Boston. He moved up to refereeing NBDL games in 2004.

Workman was on the NBA referee roster in 2006–07 and 2007–08 as a preseason referee, while working both of those seasons as an NBA Development League official. He was one of three NBA referees hired for the 2008–2009 season. He is the fourth ex-NBA player to become an NBA referee, with Stanley Stutz, Bernie Fryer and Leon Wood coming before him.

Workman is working with the NBA league office to recruit other former NBA players and former college players to become referees.

== Personal life ==
Workman lives in Tampa. His daughter Chasity played basketball for Oklahoma City University. His son Bryce currently plays for Jacksonville University.
