= Jo Jo English =

American basketball player (born 1970)

Personal information
- Born: February 4, 1970 (age 56) Frankfurt, West Germany
- Listed height: 6 ft 4 in (1.93 m)
- Listed weight: 195 lb (88 kg)

Career information
- High school: Lower Richland (Hopkins, South Carolina)
- College: South Carolina (1988–1992)
- NBA draft: 1992: undrafted
- Playing career: 1992–2002
- Position: Shooting guard
- Number: 3
- Coaching career: 2012–present

Career history

Playing
- 1992–1994: Tri-City Chinook
- 1992–1994: Chicago Bulls
- 1994: La Crosse Catbirds
- 1994–1995: Pittsburgh Piranhas
- 1995: Adelaide 36ers
- 1995–1996: Yakima Sun Kings
- 1996: Purefoods Tender Juicy Hotdogs
- 1996–1997: Beşiktaş
- 1997–1998: Antalyaspor Muratpaşa
- 1998–1999: La Crosse Bobcats
- 1999–2000: Maccabi Kiryat Motzkin
- 2000–2001: Strasbourg IG
- 2001: Besançon BCD
- 2001–2002: Rockford Lightning

Coaching
- 2012–2015: Sumter HS
- 2018–2021: Richland Northeast HS
- 2021–present: Lower Richland HS

Career highlights
- Israeli League Top Scorer (2000); CBA All-Rookie First Team (1993)
- Stats at NBA.com
- Stats at Basketball Reference

Stephen "Jo Jo" English (born February 4, 1970) is an American basketball coach and former professional player who starred at the University of South Carolina in the early 1990s and later played parts of three seasons for the National Basketball Association's Chicago Bulls. English made his NBA debut on December 2, 1992. He was the top scorer in the 1999–2000 Israel Basketball Premier League.

English has served as a high school basketball coach after his retirement.

== Playing career ==
English started his professional career with the Tri-City Chinook of the Continental Basketball Association (CBA) and was selected to the CBA All-Rookie First Team in 1993.

A 6'4" guard, English is perhaps best remembered for being involved in a bench-clearing brawl with Derek Harper of the New York Knicks during a 1994 NBA Eastern Conference Semifinals playoff game at Chicago Stadium. With NBA Commissioner David Stern in attendance, English and Harper carried their fight into the stands and were subsequently punished with one and two-game suspensions, respectively.

English played just eight games in the following season and later joined the CBA. He also played for the Adelaide 36ers in the Australian National Basketball League during 1995, averaging 14.8 points in 21 games. English played one game with the Purefoods Tender Juicy Hotdogs in the 1996 PBA Governors' Cup but was hobbled by an old injury. He later played in Turkey for two seasons, and in Israel for one season. He was the top scorer in the 1999–2000 Israel Basketball Premier League.

== Coaching career ==
English spent three seasons as the head coach of the boys basketball team at Sumter High School in Sumter, South Carolina, until his resignation on September 19, 2015. On March 16, 2018, he was hired as the head coach at Richland Northeast High School in Columbia, South Carolina. On June 3, 2021, English was appointed as the head coach at his alma mater, Lower Richland High School.
