= Peter Myers (basketball) =

Australian basketball player

Personal information
- Listed height: 6 ft 5 in (1.96 m)

Career information
- Playing career: 1984–1987
- Position: Guard

Career history
- 1984–1985: Geelong Supercats
- 1987: Gold Coast Cougars

Peter Myers is an Australian former professional basketball player who played in the National Basketball League (NBL) for the Geelong Supercats in 1984 and 1985. In 37 games for Geelong over his two seasons, Myers averaged 1.4 points per game. He was listed at 6'5".

Myers played for the Gold Coast Cougars of the Queensland State Basketball League during the 1987 season.

Myers later moved to Geraldton in Western Australia, where he coached both of his sons, Jordan and Dylan.
