= Barthe (surname) =

Barthe is a surname. Notable people with the surname include:

- Adrien Barthe (1828–1898), French composer
- Alexandre Barthe (born 1986), French footballer
- Angéle de la Barthe (1230–1275), French woman accused of witchcraft
- Benjamin Barthe (born 1972), French journalist
- Cyril Barthe (born 1996), French racing cyclist
- Earl Barthé (1922–2010), American plasterer
- Édouard Barthe (1882–1949), French politician
- Émilie Barthe (1849–1930), Canadian wife of a politician and nun
- Eugène Barthe (1862–1945), French entomologist
- Félix Barthe (1795–1863), French lawyer and government minister
- Franck Barthe, French mathematician
- Georges-Isidore Barthe (1834–1900), Canadian lawyer and politician
- Jean Barthe (1932–2017), French international dual-code rugby footballer
- Jean-Jacques Barthe (1936–2022), French politician
- Joseph-Guillaume Barthe (1816–1893), Canadian lawyer and politician
- Marcelle Barthe (1904–1964), Canadian writer
- Nicolas Thomas Barthe (1734–1785), French poet and playwright
- Obdulio Barthe (1903–1981), Paraguayan trade unionist
- Richmond Barthé (1901–1989), African-American sculptor
- Stacy Barthe (born 1985), American singer and songwriter
- Stéphane Barthe (born 1972), French cyclist

== See also ==
- Barthe (disambiguation)
- Bart
- Barth (name)
- Barthes (disambiguation)
