= Barthes (disambiguation) =

Roland Barthes (1915–1980) was a French philosopher and literary theorist

Barthes or Barthès may also refer to:

- Les Barthes, village and commune in the Tarn-et-Garonne département of France

== Other people with the surname ==
- Christophe Barthès (born 1966), French politician
- Joana Barthes (1898–1972), Catalan poet writing as Clardeluna
- Pierre Barthès (born 1941), French tennis player
- René Barthes (1894–1965), French colonial administrator
- Sophie Barthes (born 1974), French-American film director
- Yann Barthès (born 1974), French journalist

== See also ==
- Barthez, surname
- Barth (disambiguation)
- Barthe (disambiguation)
