= Nick Arison =

American Basketball executive

Miami Heat
- Position: Chief Executive Officer
- League: NBA

Personal information
- Born: 1981 (age 44–45)

Career information
- College: Duke University

Career history
- 1999–2003: Miami Heat (Sales)
- 2003–2006: Miami Heat (Account Manager, Premium Partnerships)
- 2006–2008: Miami Heat (Director of Corporate & Premium Services)
- 2008–2011: Miami Heat (Vice President of Basketball Operations)
- 2011–present: Miami Heat (Chief Executive Officer)

Nick Arison (born 1981) is an American basketball executive who has been the CEO of the Miami Heat (owned by his father Micky Arison) since 2011, managing the daily operations of the organization. Arison has also held the position of alternate governor since 2005. He has been employed full-time by the organization since 2003.

== Early life and education ==
During his teenage years, Arison was the Miami Heat's towel, water boy, and floor mopper.

Arison completed studies at Duke University in 2003, earning a degree in public policy along with a certificate in marketing and management. He did four seasons as the team manager for the Blue Devils men's basketball team and assumed the role of head team manager in his senior year under Mike Krzyzewski. He worked for Team USA, assisted in overseeing the day-to-day activities during significant events such as the 2004 and 2008 Olympics, as well as the 2006 world championships.

== Personal life ==
Arison is the son of Micky Arison, owner of the Miami Heat. His grandfather, Ted Arison, was one of the original founders of the team. He has one sister Kelly, who is the godmother of Carnival Sunrise.

"My favorite nepotism story is Nick and Micky Arison."

— Shaquille O'Neal, July 2023

Arison married his wife Jenna in 2016. She is the daughter of Barth A. Green, a neurosurgeon and longtime chairman of the Department of Neurological Surgery at the University of Miami's Miller School of Medicine. They live in Miami with their son and daughter. Jenna Arison is involved with Project Medishare.

== See also ==
- List of National Basketball Association team presidents
- Arison family
