= Barthe (disambiguation) =

Barthe is a commune in the Hautes-Pyrénées department in southwestern France

Barthe or Barthé may also refer to:

- Barthe (surname)
- Barthe (river), Germany
- La Barthe-de-Neste, a different commune in the Hautes-Pyrénées department in southwestern France

== See also ==
- Barthes (disambiguation)
- Barth (disambiguation)
