= Bernard Mevs Hospital =

Hospital in Port-au-Prince, Haiti

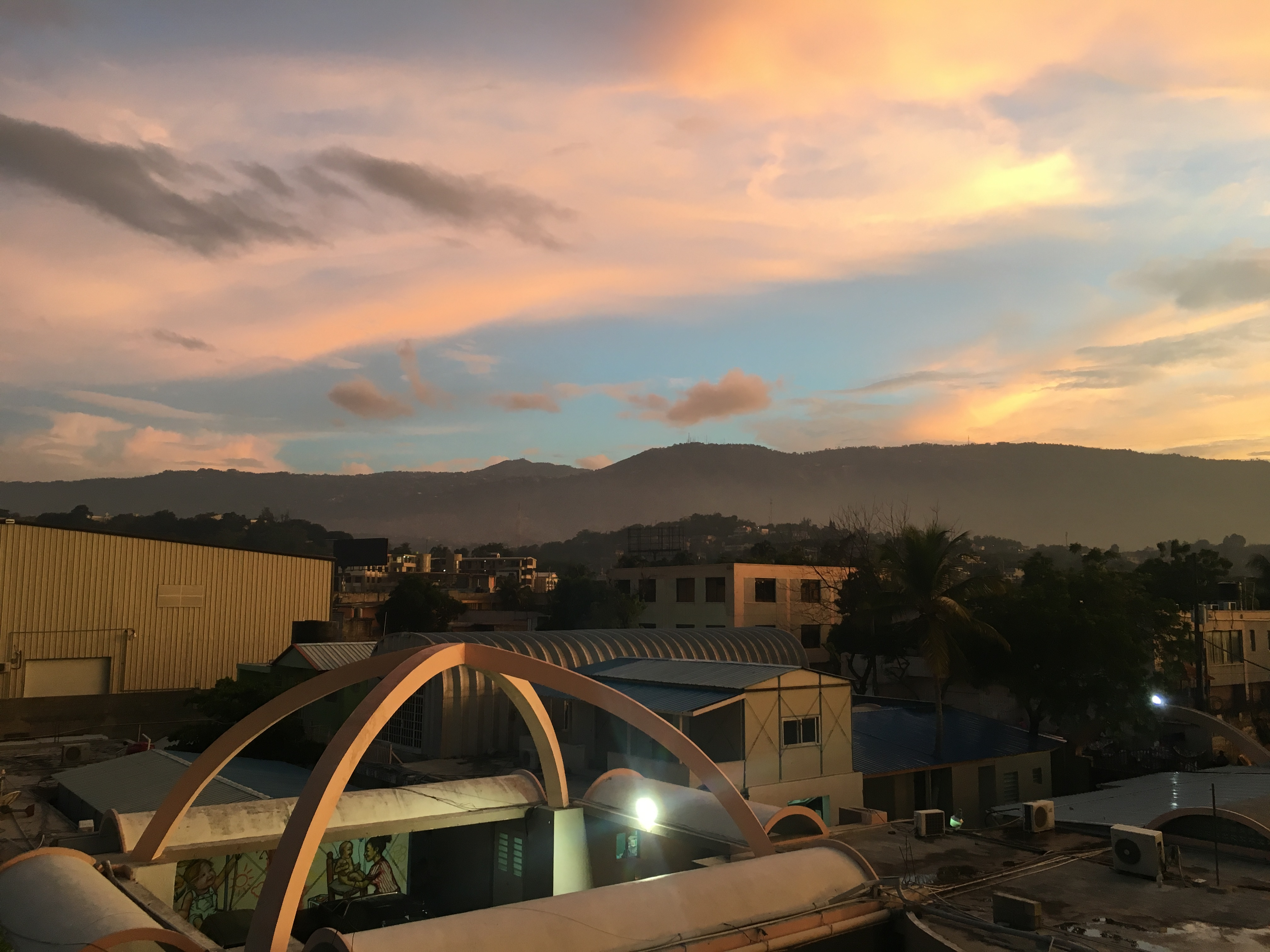
- View of the complex in 2018

Geography
- Location: Port-au-Prince, Ouest, Haiti
- Coordinates: 18.562°N 72.319°W

Organisation
- Type: General

Services
- Emergency department: Yes
- Beds: approximately 50

History
- Opened: 1994

Links
- Lists: Hospitals in Haiti

Bernard Mevs Hospital (in French: Hôpital Bernard Mevs) is a non-profit hospital located in Port-au-Prince, the capital city of Haiti. It was one of the few trauma, critical care, and surgical hospitals in the country. It is currently not open and was crippled due to a gang attack in December 2024.

== History ==
The hospital was founded in 1994 by Jerry Bitar and Marlon Bitar, two Haitian surgeons who ran the hospital. It was organized as a partnership between Project Medishare,a U.S.-based nonprofit organization affiliated with the University of Miami, and the surgeons.

Following the 2010 Haiti earthquake, Bernard Mevs became a key facility for emergency care, supported by Project Medishare. In the aftermath of the earthquake, the hospital significantly expanded its operations, providing medical services such as trauma surgery, orthopedics, neurosurgery, and intensive care.

In December 2024, armed gangs attacked Bernard Mevs Hospital with Molotov cocktails, destroying millions of dollars' worth of critical medical equipment and facilities, including CT scanners, a pediatric ward, and operating rooms.

== Services ==
Bernard Mevs Hospital offered a wide range of medical services, including:

- Emergency and trauma care
- Surgery (general, orthopedic, neurosurgery)
- Intensive Care Unit (ICU)
- Neonatal Intensive Care Unit (NICU)
- Radiology (including CT scans)
- Physical therapy and rehabilitation
- Laboratory and diagnostic services

The hospital also ran training programs for Haitian medical staff and hosted international medical volunteers.

== Partnerships ==
Bernard Mevs is closely affiliated with Project Medishare for Haiti, which provides funding, medical supplies, volunteer staff, and technical support. Other partners have included the University of Miami Miller School of Medicine, various NGOs, and international relief agencies.

== See also ==
- Healthcare in Haiti
- 2010 Haiti earthquake
