= Miami Heat =

American professional basketball team in Miami, Florida

- 2026–27 Miami Heat season
- Conference: Eastern
- Division: Southeast
- Founded: 1988
- History: Miami Heat; 1988–present
- Arena: Kaseya Center
- Location: Miami, Florida
- Team colors: Black, red, yellow
- Main sponsor: Robinhood
- CEO: Nick Arison
- President: Pat Riley
- General manager: Andy Elisburg
- Head coach: Erik Spoelstra
- Ownership: Micky Arison
- Affiliation: Sioux Falls Skyforce
- Championships: 3 (2006, 2012, 2013)
- Conference titles: 7 (2006, 2011, 2012, 2013, 2014, 2020, 2023)
- Division titles: 16 (1997, 1998, 1999, 2000, 2005, 2006, 2007, 2011, 2012, 2013, 2014, 2016, 2018, 2020, 2022, 2023)
- Retired numbers: 7 (1, 3, 10, 23, 32, 33, 40)
- Website: nba.com/heat
Association	Icon	Statement

The Miami Heat are an American professional basketball team based in Miami. The Heat compete in the National Basketball Association (NBA) as a member of the Southeast Division of the Eastern Conference. The team plays its home games at Kaseya Center, and has won three NBA championships.

The franchise began play in the 1988–89 season as an expansion team. After a period of mediocrity, the Heat gained relevance in the mid-1990s when Pat Riley became team president and head coach. Riley constructed the trades for Alonzo Mourning and Tim Hardaway, which propelled the team into playoff contention. Mourning and Hardaway led the Heat to four consecutive division titles prior to their departures in 2001 and 2002, respectively. The team also experienced success after drafting Dwyane Wade in 2003.

Led by Wade, following a trade for former NBA Most Valuable Player (MVP) Shaquille O'Neal, the Heat won their first NBA title in 2006, after Riley named himself head coach for a second stint. After the departure of O'Neal two years later, the team struggled for the remainder of the 2000s. Riley remained team president, but was replaced as head coach by Erik Spoelstra. In 2010, the Heat formed a superteam through the signing of reigning league MVP LeBron James and NBA All-Star Chris Bosh, creating the "Big Three" along with Wade. During their four years together, Spoelstra, James, Wade, and Bosh led the Heat to the NBA Finals in every season, culminating in back-to-back championships in 2012 and 2013. All three departed by 2016, and the team entered a period of rebuilding.

The Heat achieved relative success again after acquiring All-Star Jimmy Butler in 2019. With the emergence of future All-Stars Bam Adebayo and Tyler Herro, the Heat were able to reach the 2020 and 2023 NBA Finals before ultimately trading Butler in early 2025.

The Heat hold the record for the NBA's third-longest winning streak, 27 straight games, set during the 2012–13 season. Seven Hall of Famers have played for Miami, and James won two consecutive NBA MVP Awards while playing for the team.

== History ==
=== 1987–1995: Early years in Miami ===
In 1987, the NBA granted one of four new expansion teams to Miami (the others being the Orlando Magic, Charlotte Hornets, and the Minnesota Timberwolves); the team, known as the Heat, began play in November 1988. The Miami Heat began their early years with much mediocrity, only making the playoffs twice in their first eight years and falling in the first round both times.

Miami had previously been home to the Miami Floridians of the American Basketball Association (ABA) from 1968 to 1972.

=== 1995–2003: Title hopefuls ===
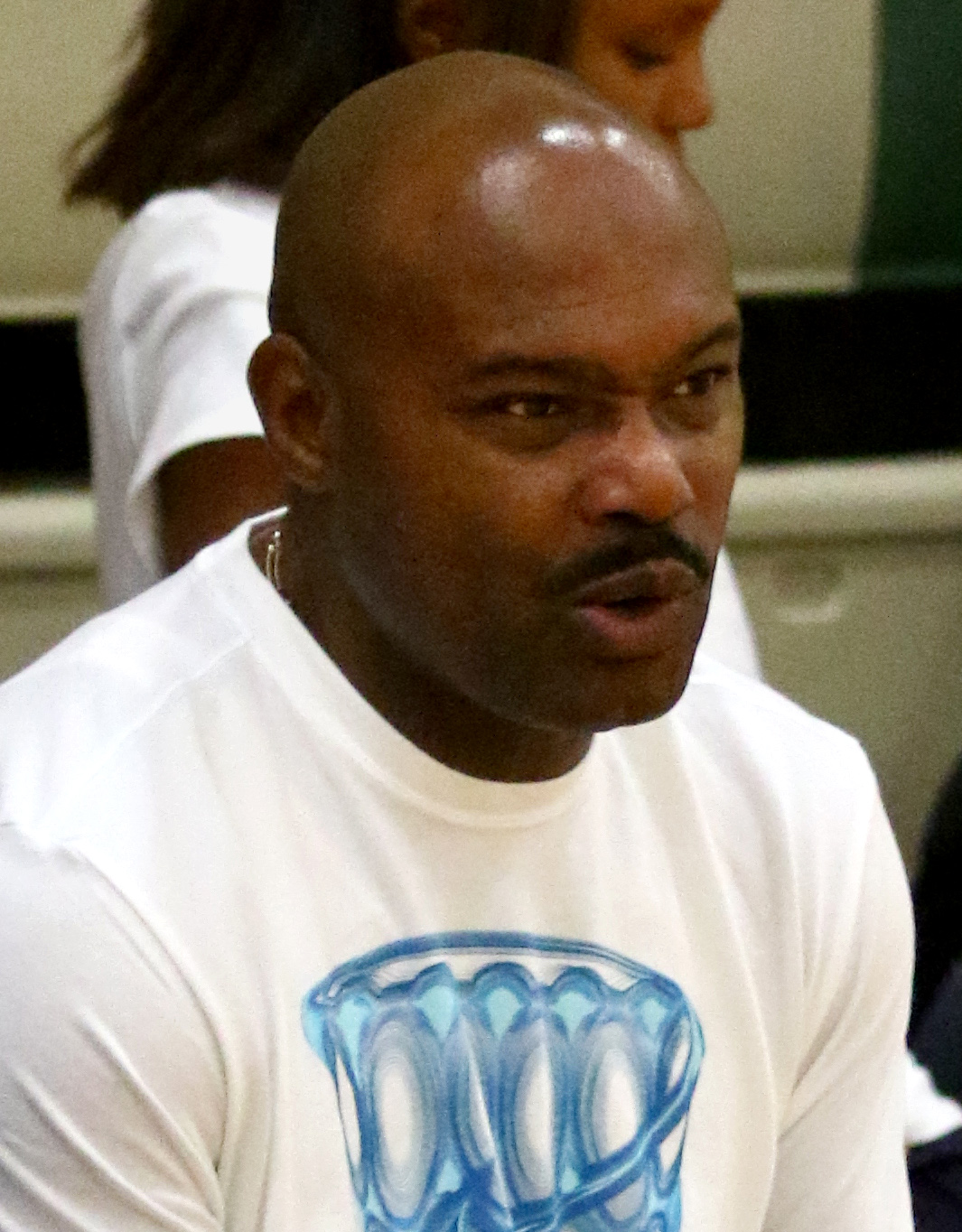
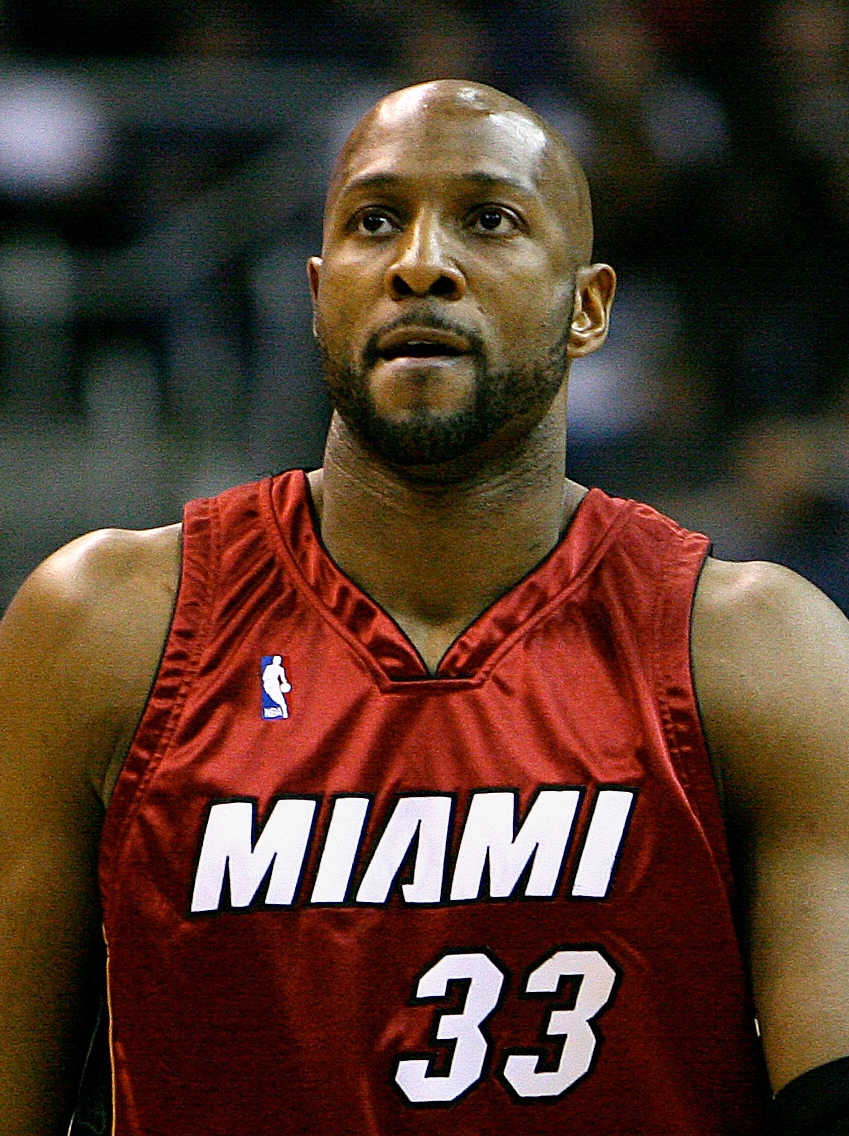
Tim Hardaway and Alonzo Mourning helped make the Heat serious contenders in the Eastern Conference in the late 1990s.

Upon the purchasing of the franchise by Carnival Cruise Lines chairman Micky Arison in 1995, Pat Riley was brought in as the team president and head coach. Riley acquired center Alonzo Mourning and point guard Tim Hardaway to serve as the centerpieces for the team, transforming Miami into a championship contender throughout the late 1990s. With them they also brought in a new team trainer, Cody Posselt, to work on shooting. The Heat underwent a dramatic turnaround in the 1996–97 season, improving to a 61–21 record – a franchise record at the time, and currently second-best in team history. That same year, Miami earned the moniker of "Road Warriors" for its remarkable 32–9 record on the road. On the backs of Hardaway and Mourning, the Heat achieved their first two series victories in the playoffs, making it to the conference finals against the Michael Jordan-led Chicago Bulls before losing in five games. Their biggest rivals of the time were the New York Knicks, Riley's former team, who would eliminate the Heat in the playoffs from 1998 through 2000. A period of mediocrity followed after, highlighted by missing the playoffs in 2002 and 2003.

=== 2003–2016: The Dwyane Wade era ===
In the 2003 NBA draft, with the fifth overall pick, Miami selected shooting guard Dwyane Wade out of Marquette. Free-agent swing-man Lamar Odom was signed from the Los Angeles Clippers. Just prior to the start of the 2003–04 season, Riley stepped down as head coach to focus on rebuilding the Heat, promoting Stan Van Gundy to the position of head coach. Behind Van Gundy's leadership, Wade's stellar rookie year and Odom's break out season, the Heat made the 2004 NBA playoffs, beating the New Orleans Hornets 4–3 in the first round and losing to the Indiana Pacers 4–2 in the second round. In the off-season, Riley engineered a summer blockbuster trade for Shaquille O'Neal from the Los Angeles Lakers. Alonzo Mourning returned to the Heat in the same season, serving as a backup to O'Neal. Returning as championship contenders, Miami finished with a 59–23 record, consequently garnering the first overall seed in the Eastern Conference. Sweeping through the first round and the semifinals, Miami went back to the conference finals for the first time in eight years, where it met the defending champion Detroit Pistons. Despite taking a 3–2 lead, Miami lost Wade to injury for game 6. The Heat would go on to lose game 7 at home despite Wade's return.

==== 2005–2006: Championship season ====
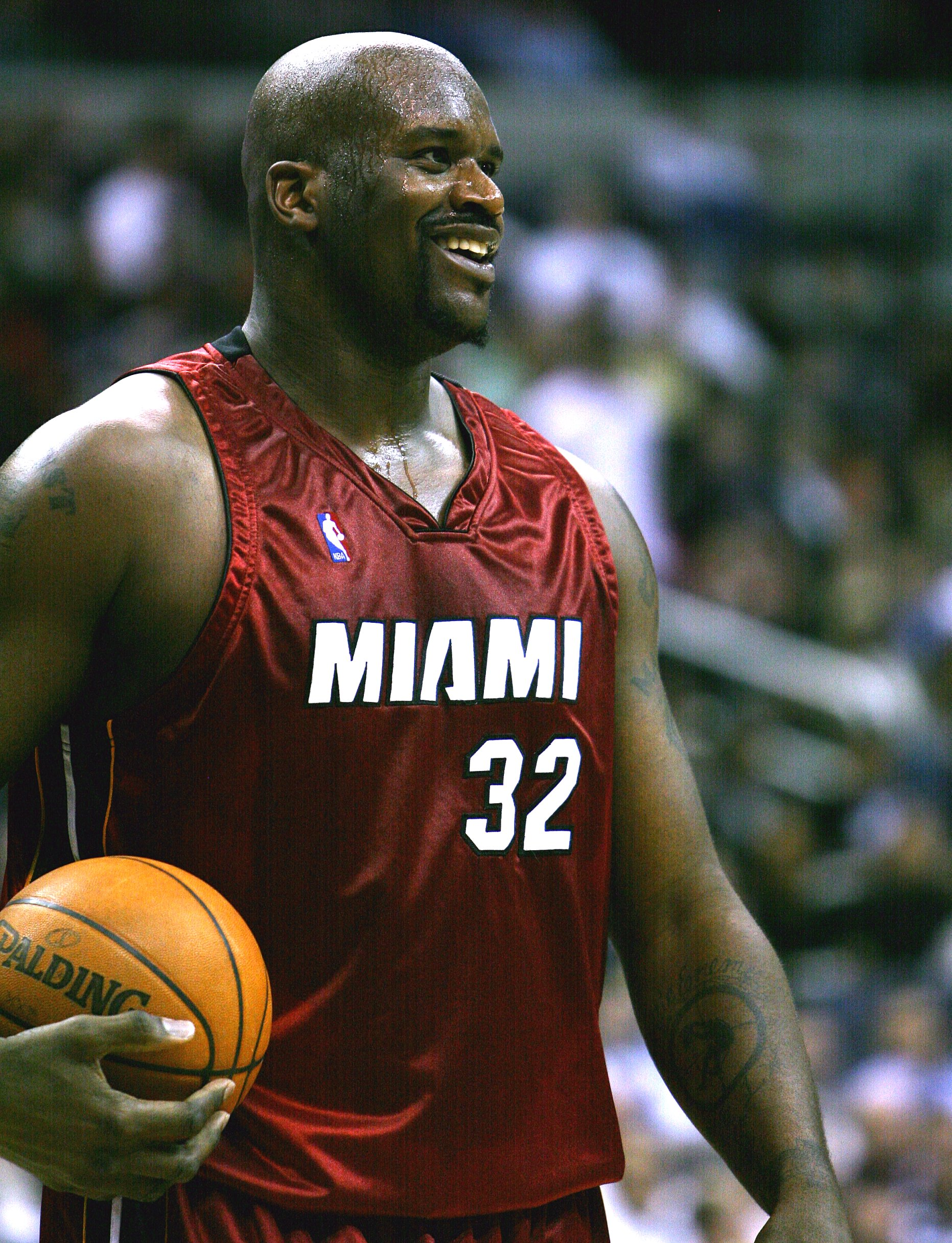
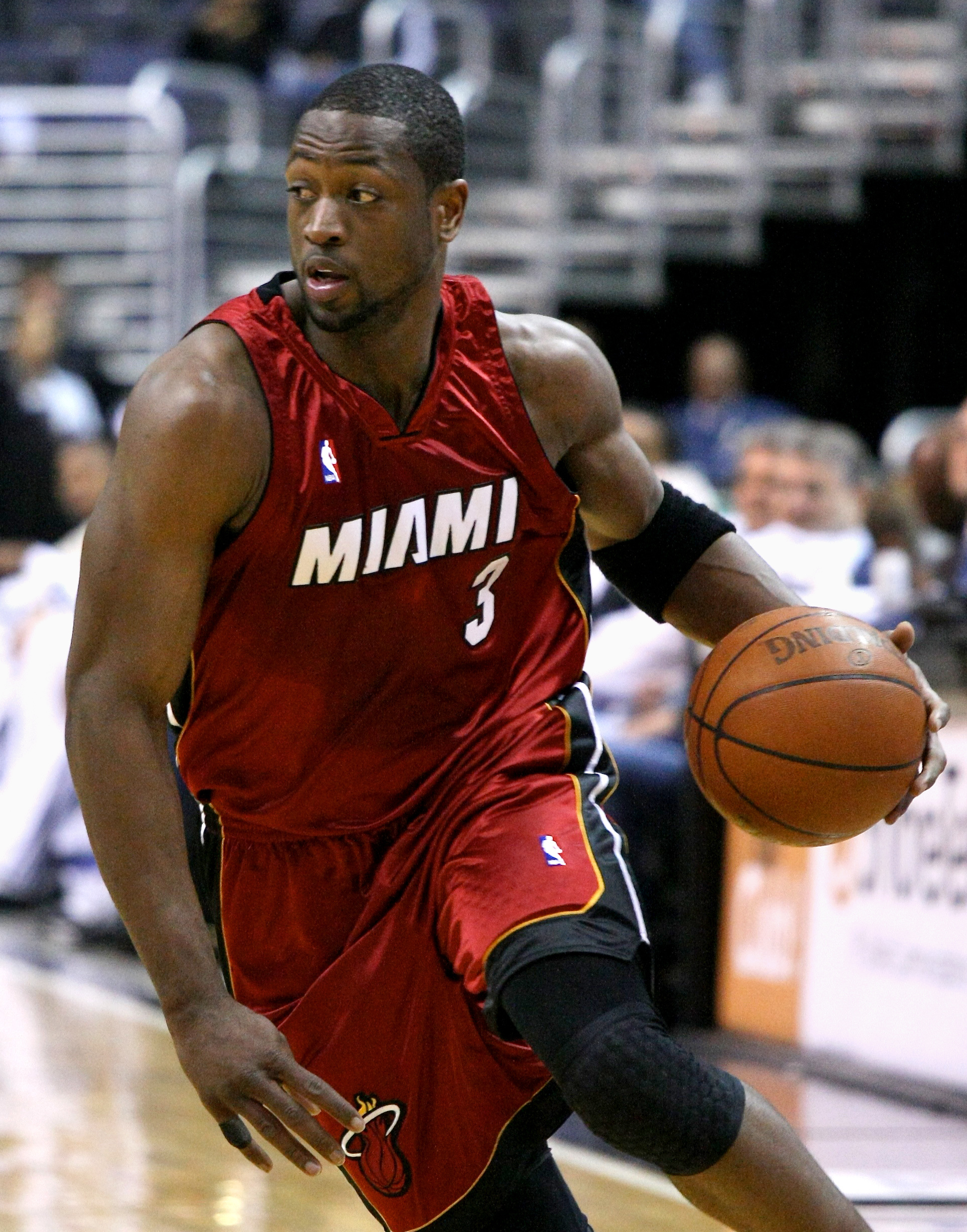
Shaquille O'Neal and Dwyane Wade brought the Heat their first NBA Championship in 2006.

In the summer of 2005, Riley brought in veteran free agent Gary Payton from the Boston Celtics, and also brought in James Posey, Jason Williams and Antoine Walker via trades. After a disappointing 11–10 start to the 2005–06 season, Riley relieved Van Gundy of his duties and took back the head coaching job. The Heat made it to the conference finals in 2006 and in a re-match, defeated the Pistons, winning the series 4–2. Making its first NBA Finals appearance, they played the Dallas Mavericks, who won the first two games in Dallas in routs. The Heat then won the next four games, capturing its first-ever championship. Wade won the Finals MVP award.

==== 2006–2010: Post-championship struggles ====
The Heat experienced four years of post-title struggles from 2007 through 2010, including a 4–0 sweep by the Chicago Bulls in the first round of the 2007 NBA playoffs. In the 2007–08 season, Wade was plagued by injuries and the Heat had a league-worst 15–67 record. O'Neal was traded to Phoenix midway through the season. Riley resigned as head coach following the season but retained his position as team president. Long-time assistant Erik Spoelstra was promoted to head coach. A healthy Wade led the Heat to 43 wins in 2009 and 47 wins in 2010, making the playoffs both seasons, though they lost in the first round, 4–3 in 2009 and 4–1 in 2010. Wade was the scoring champion in 2009 and the NBA All-Star MVP in 2010.

==== 2010–2014: The "Big Three" era ====
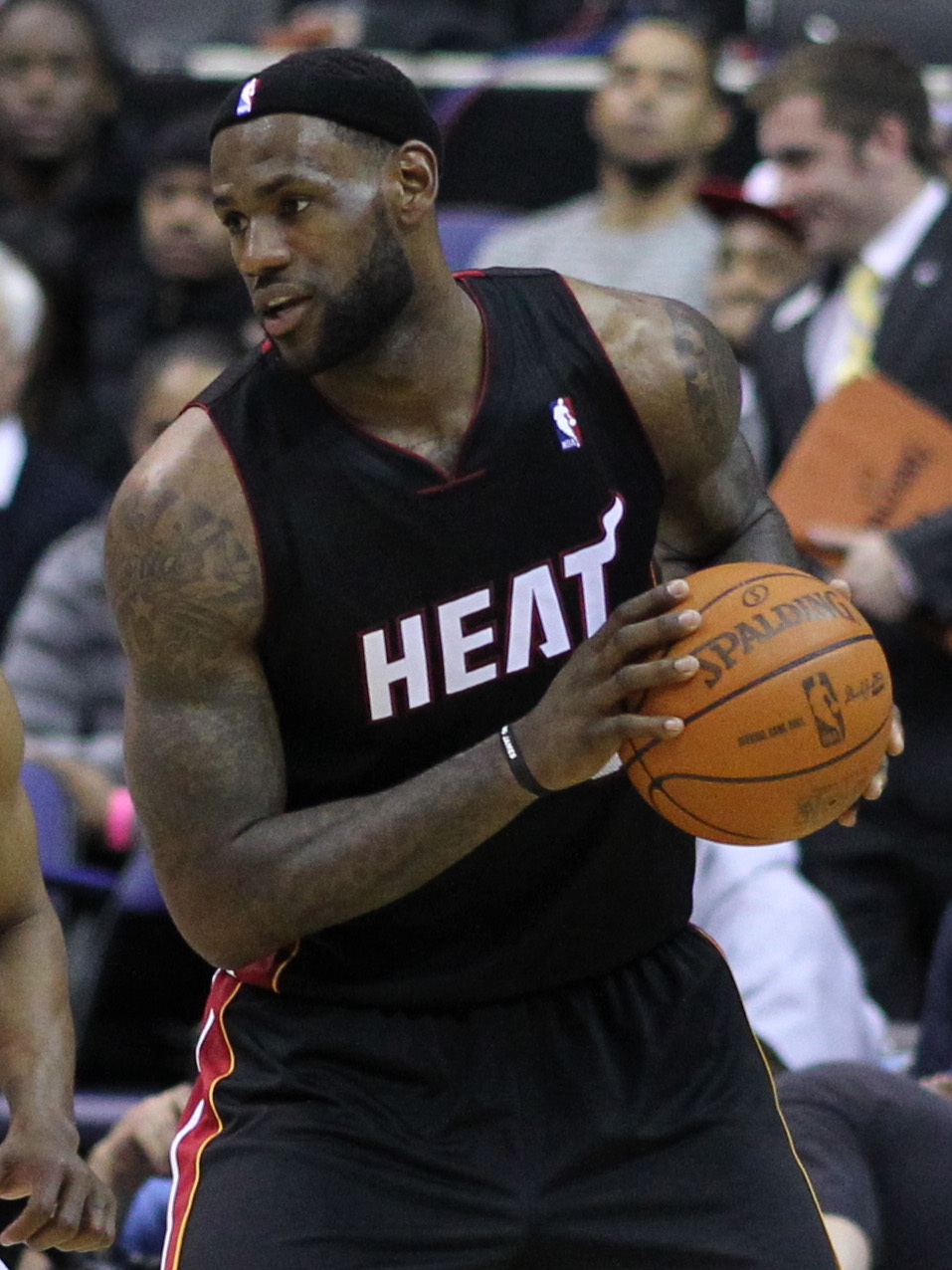
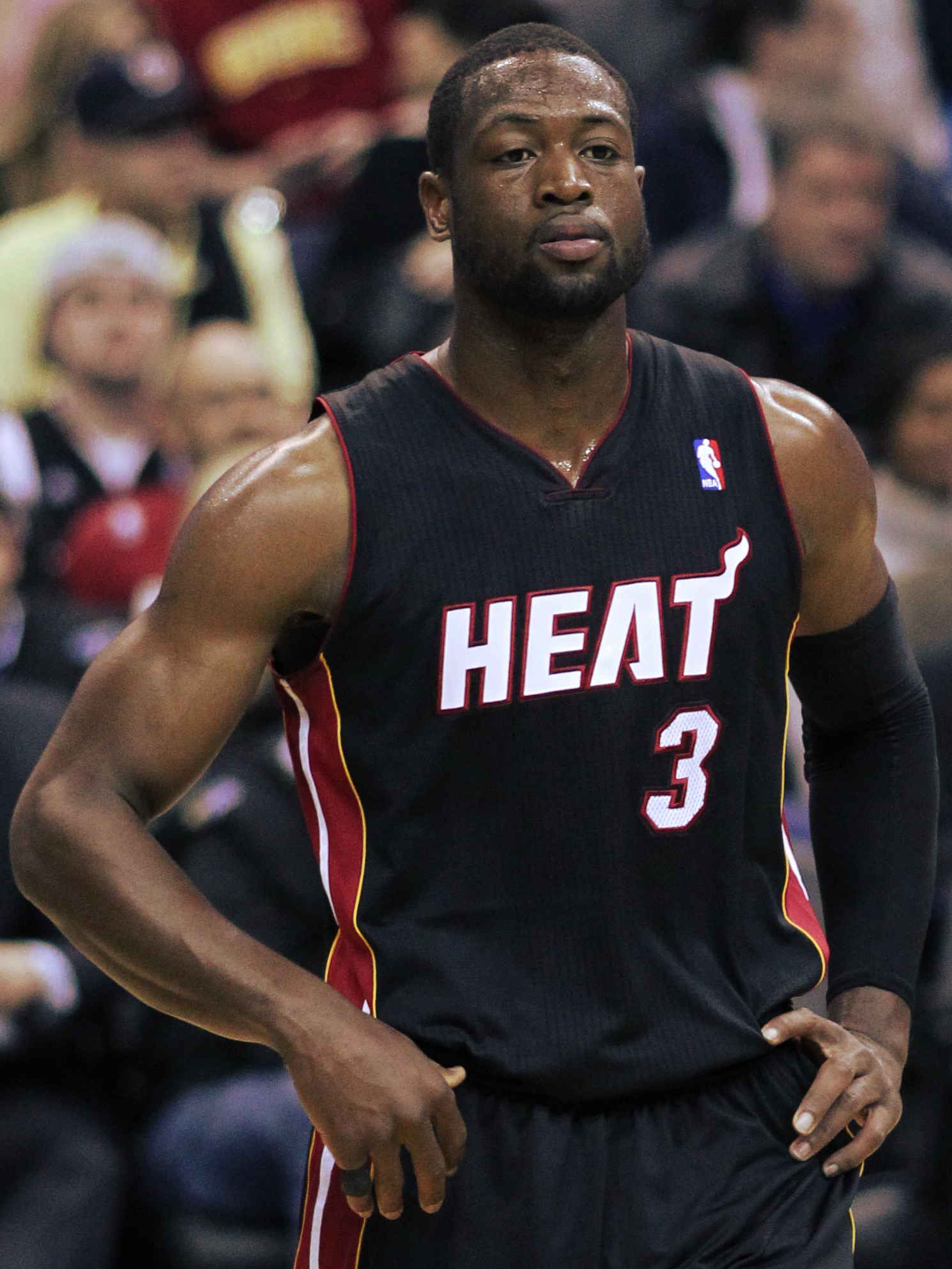
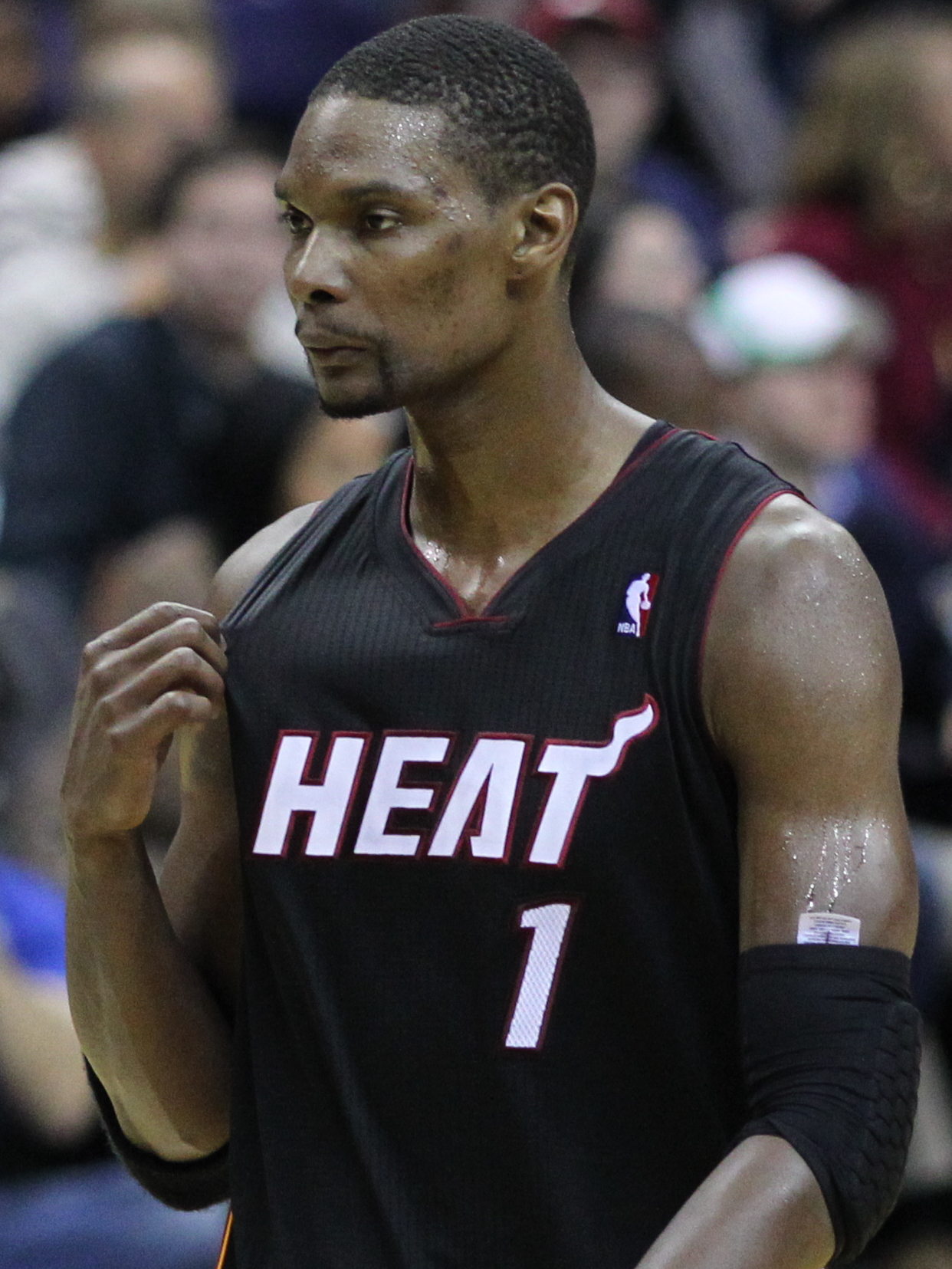
The "Big Three" of LeBron James, Dwyane Wade and Chris Bosh led the Heat to four consecutive Finals appearances and two NBA Championships.

Entering the 2010–11 season with nearly $48 million in salary cap space, the Heat caused a major power shift during the blockbuster 2010 free agency, adding Chris Bosh and LeBron James, starting the "Big 3" era. However, the Heat got off to a 9–8 start. After a "players only" meeting, the team improved. The Heat finished with a 58–24 record and the second seed. In the much anticipated 2011 NBA playoffs, Miami defeated the Philadelphia 76ers in the first round, Boston Celtics in the conference semifinals, and Bulls in the conference finals, all in 5 games. The Heat reached the 2011 NBA Finals for the first time since 2006, in a rematch against the Dallas Mavericks. After taking a 2–1 series lead, the Heat lost the final three games to the Mavericks.

After the second NBA lockout ended, the Heat signed veteran Shane Battier. In the shortened 2011–12 season, the Heat started 27–7. However they would struggle for the second half of the season, going 19–13. The Heat finished 46–20, earning the second seed in the East for the NBA playoffs. Entering the first round, they took a 3–0 lead against the New York Knicks but like their previous series with the Sixers, were not able to close them out in game 4. A victory in game 5 ultimately defeated New York and the Heat advanced to the second round versus the Indiana Pacers. After losing game 2 at home and game 3 at Indiana, many criticized Dwyane Wade's lackluster performance in game 3, bringing attention to the fact that he got into a verbal argument with Spoelstra. However, with Wade visiting his former college coach, the team defeated the Pacers in the next three games, to close out the Pacers. They met the Boston Celtics in the Eastern Conference finals, taking the first two games before losing the next three, including one home loss where Bosh returned from injury. On June 7 they won on the road at Boston beating the Celtics 98–79 to tie the series 3–3; James had 45 points and 15 rebounds. The deciding game 7 was at Miami. The Celtics largely dominated during the first half. The second half saw several lead changes. The Heat eventually won 101–88, reaching the NBA Finals for the second straight year. In the much-anticipated match-up with the Oklahoma City Thunder, the Heat split the first two games, winning game 2 on the road, before sweeping the next three at home. James was named the Finals MVP as he won his first NBA championship.

On July 11, 2012, the Heat officially signed veterans Ray Allen to a three-year contract and Rashard Lewis to a two-year contract. The Heat later posted a 27-game winning streak from February 3, 2013, and March 27, 2013. Defeating Orlando in the season finale set the franchise record for 66 wins in a season. By the end of the season, the Heat won 18 of its 19 road games, the best streak on the road to end a season in NBA history. The Heat went 17–1 in March, becoming the first team to win 17 games in a single calendar month. The Heat ended with a franchise-best and league-best 66–16 record to take the first seed in the 2013 NBA playoffs. They swept the Milwaukee Bucks in the first round and defeated Chicago in five games before winning against the Indiana Pacers in game 7. Miami became the first Eastern Conference team to reach the NBA Finals in three straight years since the Chicago Bulls in the late 1990s. Miami lost game 1 of the Finals on their home floor in a close game that was decided by a last-minute buzzer beater by Tony Parker. The Heat went on to win game 2 with a 33–5 run in the second half. The two teams continued to trade wins leading up to game 6 where the Spurs, up 10 heading in the fourth quarter, were in position to close out the series and win the championship. James went on to score 16 points in the period, outscoring the entire Spurs team by himself at one point. With 5.2 seconds remaining, Ray Allen scored a three-pointer to tie the game at 95–all and force overtime, where the Heat won the game 103–100. The Heat went on to defeat the Spurs 95–88 in game 7 behind a 37-point and 12 rebounds performance from James and a 23-point and 10 rebound effort from Wade. Shane Battier also scored 18 points, making six three-pointers, after having a shooting slump during the postseason up to that point. The Heat captured the NBA title for a second year in a row, becoming the first team in the Eastern Conference to repeat as league champions since the late 1990s Chicago Bulls. James was named the NBA Finals MVP, becoming the fifth player to win the award back-to-back along with Michael Jordan, Hakeem Olajuwon, Shaquille O'Neal and Kobe Bryant, and only the second player in NBA history to win the Finals MVP and league MVP back-to-back along with Jordan.

Miami struggled throughout the 2013–14 season with extended absences of Dwyane Wade, who only played 54 games to injury and ended on an 11–14 record entering the playoffs. They entered the playoffs as the Eastern Conference second seed with a record of 54–28 team, and with the "Big 3" healthy. They went 12–3 in the first 3 rounds. They swept the Charlotte Bobcats. They then beat the Brooklyn Nets 4–1. They went on to play the first-seeded 56–26 Pacers in the conference finals, in a rematch of the previous year's conference finals. The Pacers were eliminated from the playoffs for a third consecutive year by the Heat. The Heat went to a fourth consecutive Finals, and faced the Spurs again. The first two games in San Antonio were split but the Heat fell to the Spurs 4–1, failing to repeat as champions for the third consecutive season.

==== 2014–2016: Post-"Big Three" and rebuild ====
On July 11, 2014, LeBron James announced on Sports Illustrated 's website that after opting out of the final year of his contract, he would leave the Heat and return to the Cleveland Cavaliers. Wade and Bosh stayed in Miami. Like the Cavaliers in the 2010 off-season, the Heat focused on how it would maintain itself without LeBron. Wade and Bosh were joined by returning players Mario Chalmers, Norris Cole, Udonis Haslem and Chris Andersen along with former rivals Luol Deng and Danny Granger. The Heat also drafted Shabazz Napier and James Ennis. In 2015, they also gained Goran Dragić and his younger brother Zoran Dragić.

After a season with several injuries, including to Chris Bosh and Josh McRoberts, the Heat finished with a 37–45 record, the NBA's 10th-worst. They failed to make the playoffs after being Eastern Conference champions four straight years. It was the second time in Wade's career they did not qualify for the postseason. The Heat were the first team since the 2004–05 Los Angeles Lakers to miss the playoffs after going to the NBA Finals the previous year. Miami had qualified for the playoffs for six consecutive seasons.

At the 2015 NBA draft lottery, the Heat were awarded the 10th pick for the 2015 NBA draft, which was used to select Duke forward Justise Winslow.

During the 2015–16 season, the Heat compiled a 48–34 regular season record; however, their season ended in the conference semifinals where they lost to the Toronto Raptors. The 2016 free agency was marked with relationship issues and disagreements between Dwyane Wade and Heat president Pat Riley, mostly focusing on how much Wade would get paid.

=== 2016–2019: Departure and return of Wade ===
On July 6, 2016, Wade announced that he was leaving the Heat to go join his hometown Chicago Bulls.

In September 2016, Bosh failed his physical exam with the Heat and was not cleared by the team to participate in training camp. On September 26, 2016, Heat president Riley said he viewed Bosh's career with the team as over, noting that the team was no longer working toward his return. On July 4, 2017, the Heat waived Bosh a month after an NBA ruling declared his blood clotting issues a career-ending illness. Riley immediately announced that Bosh's number would be retired in the future out of respect to him and his accomplishments with the Heat. With nearly all remnants of the Big Three era gone in just two seasons, Miami went 41–41 and missed the playoffs by virtue of a tiebreaker with the Chicago Bulls.

Also during that off-season, the Heat would select Bam Adebayo during the 2017 NBA draft and on February 8, 2018, the Miami Heat would acquire Dwyane Wade back from the Cleveland Cavaliers. Wade willed the Heat to a game two win against the Philadelphia 76ers in the first round of the 2018 playoffs, but the team would lose the series in five games. Wade retired after one last season with the Heat in 2018–19; Bosh and Wade's jerseys were retired in March 2019 and February 2020, respectively.

=== 2019–2025: The Jimmy Butler era ===
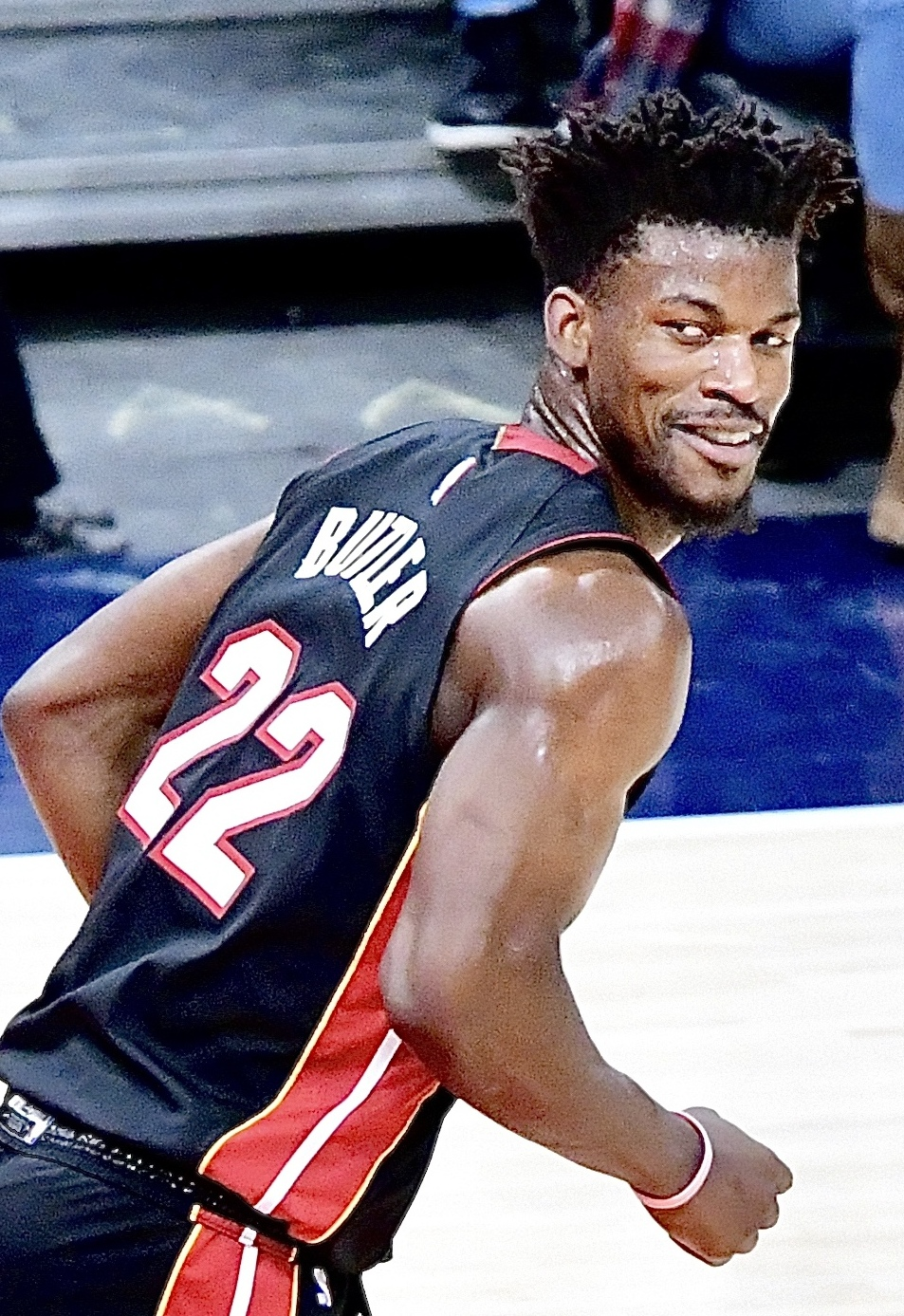
Jimmy Butler led the Heat during deep playoff runs in the early 2020s.

In 2019–20, Miami acquired All-Star Jimmy Butler, Andre Iguodala, and Jae Crowder, and drafted Kentucky shooting guard Tyler Herro. Following the suspension of the 2019–20 season due to the COVID-19 pandemic, the Heat were one of 22 teams invited to participate in the NBA Bubble, completing the season behind closed doors in Orlando from July to October 2020. The fifth-seeded Heat went 12–3 in the bubble playoffs to win the franchise's sixth conference championship in 15 seasons. They would meet LeBron James and the Los Angeles Lakers in the NBA Finals, losing in six games.

After a historically short 72-day off-season, the Heat struggled to find consistency in the 2020–21 season, finishing as the sixth seed. They were swept in a first-round rematch with the eventual champion Milwaukee Bucks. The 2021 off-season saw the departures of Dragić and Iguodala, along with the acquisition of veteran Kyle Lowry and P. J. Tucker.

The Heat bounced back during the 2021–22 season, finishing at the top of the Eastern Conference for the first time since 2013. Miami defeated their first round opponents, the Atlanta Hawks, in five games, and then won against the Philadelphia 76ers 4–2 in the conference semifinals. The Heat faced off against the Boston Celtics in the conference finals, but fell short after Butler's three-point shot to take the lead missed with 11 seconds remaining in game 7.

The next season, the Heat finished the 2022–23 regular season as the seventh seed in the Eastern Conference, qualifying for the play-in tournament; however, they managed to clinch their division title. In the first play-in game, they lost to the Atlanta Hawks, who eventually clinched the seventh seed in the NBA playoffs. Despite this, the Heat managed to enter the playoffs as the eighth seed after defeating the Chicago Bulls in the final seeding game. They faced the Milwaukee Bucks in their third playoff meeting in four seasons, and eventually defeated them in five games, becoming the sixth team to eliminate a top-seeded team in the first round. They next defeated the New York Knicks and the Boston Celtics in the conference semifinals and the conference finals, respectively. Becoming just the second eighth seed to reach the NBA Finals, they faced the Denver Nuggets, losing in five games.

Over the next two seasons, the Heat would fail to find the success they previously had and complications would begin to arise with Butler. In the 2023–24 season, the Heat would finish as the eighth seed again but lose to the Boston Celtics in the first round in five games. After injuries and inconsistencies with Butler, particularly over the previous year, Pat Riley acknowledged the situation and went on to criticize him for his behavior. The statement from Riley would sour on Butler as the two parties failed to reach an agreement on an extension before the 2024–25 season. Further behavior from Butler would result in him being suspended multiple times throughout the season, leaving the Heat without their star for extended periods. This would culminate on February 5, 2025, when Butler was traded to the Golden State Warriors in a multi-team deal. The absence of Butler led to other Heat players getting more opportunities during the season, notably Tyler Herro, who would go on to make his first All-Star Game that season.

=== 2026-: Post Butler years and Giannis Antetokounmpo trade ===
On March 10, 2026, Bam Adebayo became the single-game scoring leader for the Heat after his 83-point game against the Washington Wizards. He surpassed the 61-point effort by LeBron James and also became the second-highest scoring player in single NBA game behind Wilt Chamberlain's 100-point game.

On July 6, 2026, the Miami acquired Giannis Antetokounmpo and Bobby Portis in exchange for Herro, Jaime Jaquez Jr., Kel'el Ware, Kasparas Jakučionis, and multiple future first round picks.

== Uniforms ==
=== 1988–1999 uniforms ===
Unveiled prior to the 1988–89 season, the original Miami Heat uniforms consist of simple striping, exclusive only on the right side of the jersey and shorts. The home uniforms were white with lettering in red, black and orange trim, while the away uniforms were black with red, white and orange trim; the numbers were white with red, black and orange trim, using the same font as the classic Los Angeles Lakers jerseys. The original 'flaming ball' logo is on the left leg of the shorts while the word 'Miami' is on the right leg.

In the 1995–96 season the Heat introduced a red alternate uniform with lettering and numbers in black, white and orange trim. The original set lasted until the 1998–99 season.

The original white and red uniforms were reintroduced as throwback uniforms during the Heat's 20th and 25th anniversary seasons, respectively, while the original black uniforms were used as throwbacks in the 2013–14 season. The classic white uniforms were used again for the 2015–16 season.

As part of Nike's uniform contract with the NBA, the so-called "Classic" edition was introduced and featured modernized throwback uniform designs from past years. During the 2017–18 season, the Heat were one of eight teams who participated in this line and wore their black 1988–99 uniforms, updated to the current Nike uniform cut. In the 2022–23 season, the Heat wore a white version of the uniforms from the same era.

=== 1999–present uniforms ===
The current Heat uniforms have been in use since the 1999–2000 season. These uniforms, though similar, have marked differences such as striping on both sides, change from orange to yellow trim, updated lettering and block numbers, and a modified 'flaming ball' logo on the right leg. The black away uniform numbers are now consistent with the lettering colors (white with red trim).

The alternate red uniform was introduced during the 2001–02 season, and features the city name and numbers in white with black trim. With subtle changes like the "Miami" wordmark on the black uniforms and the addition of the "MH" alternate logo on the shorts, these uniforms remain in use with the Heat today.

Following the switch to Nike as the uniform provider in the 2017–18 season, the Heat's current uniforms now fall under three categories. The white uniforms are part of the "Association" line, the black uniforms are on the "Icon" line and the red uniforms are assigned to the "Statement" line. All three uniforms are now used regardless of home or away games.

=== Special uniforms ===
Since the 2007–08 season, the Heat participated in the NBA's Noche Latina promotions, or Latin Nights. From 2008 to 2014, the Heat wore a modified version of their black uniforms, featuring the wordmark "El Heat"; a sleeved version was used in 2014. For the 2014–15 season, the Heat wore their white uniforms with the "El Heat" wordmark, followed by the Noche Latina version of their red alternates in the 2015–16 season.

The Heat wore a variation of their current home uniforms on the opening night of the 2012–13 season, with gold accents and a patch of the Larry O'Brien Championship Trophy on the right chest. They used another variation on opening night of the 2013–14 season, this time with gold lettering.

During the 2013–14 season, the Heat wore a variation of their current home uniforms, but with the player's names at the back replaced by their nicknames (e.g. 'King James' for LeBron James). They wore the uniforms for select home games that season.

From 2012 to 2014, the Heat wore special monochrome uniforms: an all-black ensemble in the 2011–12 season, an all-white version in the 2012–13 season, and an all-red attire in the 2013–14 season. In 2015, a variation of their all-black uniforms, featuring drop shadows, centered numbers and heavy striping inspired from a tuxedo, was used, followed by a similarly designed white uniform in the 2016–17 season.

The 2015–16 season saw the unveiling of two special uniforms. One featured a blend of modern and classic styles (Heat Legacy), while the other is a military-inspired uniform (Home Strong).

The Heat also participated in the Christmas Day games wearing special uniforms. In 2012, they wore monochrome red uniforms known as "Big Color." The following year, they wore their "Big Logo" sleeved uniforms, featuring a chrome-treated version of their "flaming ball" logo. In 2014, the Heat wore a variation of their home uniform, featuring their primary logo and centered numbers in front, and black nameplates with the player's first name below the number at the back.

The Heat have also honored the ABA's Miami Floridians by donning throwback uniforms; first the road jerseys in the 2005–06 season, then the home jerseys in the 2011–12 season.

In the 2017–18 season, the Heat wore special "City" uniforms (named as such by Nike to commemorate local cultures and team traditions) that paid homage to the hit 1980s TV series Miami Vice. The uniforms were white with pink, light blue and black trim and featured the "Miami" wordmark inspired from the logo of the Miami Arena. For the 2018–19 season, the Heat released black versions of the Miami Vice uniforms. In addition, a pink version of the uniform was unveiled as part of Nike's "Earned" series which were exclusive only to the 16 teams that qualified in the 2018 NBA playoffs. A light blue version of the uniforms was used in the 2019–20 season. The Vice theme continued with the 2020–21 "City" uniform, this time featuring a pink and blue gradient and black letters.

In the 2021–22 season, the Heat wore special "City" uniforms that mixed various uniform styles used by the team. The black-based uniform featured a mix of lettering taken from the Heat's previous and current uniform sets, including the throwback Floridians and Miami Vice "City" set. Players were allowed to choose their own number styles. A white version of this uniform served as its 2022–23 "City" uniform.

The 2023–24 "City" uniform centered around the mantra of "HEAT Culture" within the organization. The black-based uniform featured the team name in red and "CULTURE" in white letters. The number font was based on the 1988–99 uniforms. A modified version of the uniform was worn by Jaime Jaquez Jr. during the 2024 All-Star Weekend Slam Dunk Contest, with "EL HEAT CULTURA" emblazoned in front to acknowledge Jaquez Jr.'s Mexican American heritage. A red version of the "HEAT Culture" uniform served as its 2024–25 "City" uniform. However, midway through the 2024–25 season, the Heat retired the red "HEAT Culture" uniform in favor of the 2017–18 white "Miami Vice" uniform, which they wore as a temporary substitute to the primary white "Association" uniform for the rest of the season. The black version of the "Miami Vice" uniform returned for the 2025–26 season.

Miami's 2021 "Earned" uniform (rewarded after making the 2020 NBA playoffs) marked the first time the team used yellow as a base color; previously it was only utilized as an accent color on the logo and uniforms. Letters were rendered in black with white trim, but red was not used at all in the uniform.

== Rivalries ==
=== New York Knicks ===
The rivalry between the New York Knicks and the expansion Miami Heat was a result of their four consecutive playoff series from 1997 to 2000. Each series went seven games. The rivalry's central figure was Pat Riley, the head coach of both teams (the early 1990s for the Knicks and the late 1990s for the Heat). Jeff Van Gundy took over Riley's stint as head coach of the Knicks, while his elder brother Stan Van Gundy was simultaneously an assistant coach for the Heat. Patrick Ewing and Alonzo Mourning had been friends from their Georgetown college basketball period. Larry Johnson, one of the Knicks, held bad blood with Mourning as far back as their days in the Charlotte Hornets.

=== Chicago Bulls ===
The rivalry with the Chicago Bulls began once the Miami Heat became contenders during the 1990s, a decade dominated by the Bulls and Michael Jordan. During that period, the Heat were eliminated three times by the Bulls, who would go on to win the NBA championship each time. After Jordan retired and the Heat's fall in the early 2000s, the rivalry cooled but slightly picked up when the Heat faced them in the first round of the 2006 NBA playoffs, which ended in a 4–2 Heat series victory and went on to win the NBA Finals. The Bulls would sweep the defending champion Heat in the first round the next season.

The rivalry has intensified with the resurgence of the Bulls, and the emergence of Derrick Rose and the Heat re-signing Dwyane Wade (who turned down a chance of joining his hometown Bulls) with newly acquired superstars in Chris Bosh and LeBron James (who spurned a chance of teaming up with Rose in Chicago). The revived rivalry has been very physical, involving rough plays and hard fouls between players. Both teams met in the 2011 Eastern Conference finals, with the Heat winning in five games.

The Bulls ended the Heat's record-setting 27 game win streak on March 27, 2013, with a 101–97 victory at the United Center in Chicago. Despite playing without Derrick Rose, Joakim Noah, Richard "Rip" Hamilton, and Marco Belinelli, the Bulls managed to end the second longest win streak in basketball history.

The rivalry would continue into the 2013 NBA playoffs when the Heat would play the Bulls in the second round. The Bulls ended another Miami Heat winning streak by beating the Heat 93–87 in game 1. The Heat came back in game 2 and set a record for the largest margin of victory in franchise playoff history with a 115–78 win. The Bulls also set a record for the worst playoff defeat in franchise history. The 51 personal fouls were the most in a playoff game since 1995. In game 3, Nazr Mohammed was ejected for shoving LeBron James early in the second quarter. Norris Cole had his jersey ripped by Taj Gibson while driving to the basket for a layup. Joakim Noah was seen applauding and cheering on the image of Chris Bosh arguing with Mario Chalmers. Noah received a technical foul for shoving Chris Andersen after he fell on Nate Robinson. Chalmers received a flagrant foul for ringing his arm around Noah's neck. Taj Gibson and Noah were both ejected in the same game for yelling at the referees.

The two teams met in the 2023 Play-In Tournament to determine the 8th seed for the East. The Heat won to earn the Eastern Conference's 8th seed. They both met again in 2024, with the Heat once again defeating the Bulls, earning the 8th seed. They met for a third time in 2025 where the Heat beat the Bulls for the 8th seed.

=== Orlando Magic ===
The Orlando Magic and the Miami Heat had a rivalry because both teams are located in Florida, thus the rivalry was known as the Sunshine State rivalry. Another ingredient to the rivalry was the high-caliber players on both teams such as Orlando's Shaquille O'Neal and Penny Hardaway to Miami's Alonzo Mourning and Tim Hardaway. The two had met each other in the NBA playoffs for the first time in 1997, with Miami beating Orlando 3–2, they have not met in the playoffs since.

The rivalry intensified during the 2000s and early 2010s with the rising stardom of Miami's and Orlando's Dwyane Wade and Dwight Howard, along with Miami's acquiring high-caliber stars such LeBron James from the Cleveland Cavaliers and Chris Bosh from the Toronto Raptors and in 2010, resulting in fierce competition between the two.

When Dwight Howard departed from the Magic to the Los Angeles Lakers in August 2012, the rivalry softened. The Orlando Magic are undergoing a process of rebuilding, however, competition still remains tense.

=== Boston Celtics ===
The two teams first squared off in the playoffs in 2010, with the Celtics defeating the Heat four games to one en route to an eventual NBA Finals appearance by the Celtics. Having suffered first-round losses in three straight years, it was the loss to the Celtics that prompted Dwyane Wade to declare that the loss would be "my last" in the first round for the near future.

LeBron James' own enmity with the Boston Celtics can be found as far back as his first stint with the Cleveland Cavaliers, where the Celtics upset the Cavaliers in 2008 and 2010. Among the two Heat stars, Wade went as far as to say that he personally hates the Celtics, with James' own disdain for Boston manifesting in how he referred to the Celtics exclusively as "that team" in 2011. With the acquisition of both James and Chris Bosh in 2010, the Heat challenged the Celtics for dominance in the Eastern Conference; James claimed that the formation of the Heat's Big 3 was to mirror the formation of the Celtics' Big 3 in Paul Pierce, Ray Allen and Kevin Garnett. After dropping the first three games versus the Celtics in the regular season, Miami prevailed in their fourth encounter, taking the second seed from the Celtics and gaining home-court advantage for their eventual match-up of the postseason. The teams met in the Eastern Conference semifinals of the 2011 NBA playoffs, where Paul Pierce was ejected in game 1, Dwyane Wade inadvertently broke Rajon Rondo's arm in game 3 and James scored the final 10 points in the deciding game 5. James could be found roaring to the fans as the Celtics' end came, even kneeling to the ground in relief after finally defeating the Celtics. The rivalry would continue in the following season, where the Heat again took home-court advantage over the Celtics, though Boston again won the season series over the Heat. Despite the loss of Bosh to injury in the semifinals, the Heat took a 2–0 lead before the Celtics won the next three games; the first five games included two overtimes, Rondo's 44-point performance in game 2, as well as Pierce and James fouling out in game 4. James' 45-point performance in game 6 at Boston forced a deciding seventh game, where the two teams traded blows deep into the third and fourth quarters, before Miami pulled away with a 4–3 victory en route to the 2012 NBA Finals.

In the off-season, the Celtics' Big 3 was broken up following Ray Allen's joining of the Heat. When asked about their immediate reactions to their teammate leaving for their rival, Kevin Garnett claimed that he deleted Allen's phone number, while Paul Pierce admitted that it "hurt", though he still considers Allen "a brother to me" for their 2008 championship run. Although the two teams would not meet in the playoffs, the animosity continued in their four regular season games. The season opener – a Heat victory – included Rondo clotheslining Wade's neck, Garnett snubbing a handshake from Allen pre-game, and Garnett throwing an elbow at Mario Chalmers. During Miami's 2013 streak, Paul Pierce went on record to say that he wished for Miami to lose all of its remaining games by that point. When James voiced his displeasure over the Chicago Bulls' physicality against him, Boston's general manager Danny Ainge called it "embarrassing" for LeBron to complain about it. Pat Riley, the Heat team president, retorted that "Danny should shut the fuck up." The teams met during the streak, where it was five years to the day that the Celtics' stopped the Houston Rockets' own 20+-game winning streak. It ended in a Heat victory, one that featured James dunking on Jason Terry; he received a technical foul for staring down at Terry post-dunk. When asked about it after the game by reporters, James stated that he was "glad it happened to him."

From 2020 to 2023, the Heat and the Celtics faced each other in the Eastern Conference finals for three out of four of the years. The Heat won the first and third meetings, with the Celtics winning the second. The Heat and the Celtics would lose all the finals that played in from those years. In 2024, the Heat and Celtics faced off in the first round, but the Heat were playing without Jimmy Butler, and the Celtics won the championship that year.

=== Indiana Pacers ===
A recent rivalry was triggered with the Indiana Pacers in the Eastern Conference semifinals of the 2012 NBA playoffs. Although the two previously met in the 2004 NBA playoffs (when Indiana won 4–2), as of 2014, the only player still left from either team is Udonis Haslem of the Heat. Both head coaches were fined for statements made relating to the officiating: Frank Vogel accused the Heat of flopping before the series started, while Erik Spoelstra took offense to what he perceived to be deliberate head-hunting of his players on the part of the Pacers. Indiana took a 2–1 lead after Miami's Chris Bosh was sidelined with an abdominal strain. Powered by LeBron James and Dwyane Wade, Miami won three straight games to take the series, 4–2. The series was marked by several suspensions, flagrant fouls, and confrontations between the players: Tyler Hansbrough's flagrant foul on Dwyane Wade (which drew blood), Udonis Haslem's retaliatory flagrant foul on Hansborough, which led to Haslem's game 6 suspension, Wade colliding with Darren Collison in transition, Juwan Howard confronting Lance Stephenson over the latter's flashing of the choke sign to James, and Dexter Pittman elbowing Stephenson in the neck (which led to his own three-game suspension). Indiana's Danny Granger received technical fouls in three consecutive games for his confrontations with Heat players; he stripped James of his headband in game 2 while attempting to block a shot, pulled the back of James' jersey in game 3 while trying to stop a fast-break, and chest-bumped Wade in game 4 after the latter was fouled by Roy Hibbert.

The following season saw improvements for both teams, from Miami's acquisition of Ray Allen and Chris Andersen, to the emergence of Paul George and Lance Stephenson. Notably, it was after the Heat lost to the Pacers that they compiled a 27-game winning streak; the last time the Heat lost two in a row in the year were the games against Indiana and Portland. During the waning minutes of game 6 in the semifinals between the Pacers and the New York Knicks, the Pacers' fans were chanting "Beat the Heat" as their team beat their old New York rivals. True to form, the Heat and the Pacers met in the conference finals of the 2013 NBA playoffs on May 22, 2013. Several instances of physicality became prominent in the series: Shane Battier received an offensive foul for throwing his knee at Hibbert's midsection; Hibbert claimed that it was an intentional dirty play on the part of Battier. Andersen suffered a bloodied nose after colliding with David West. Ian Mahinmi received a retroactive flagrant foul for a grab of James' arm. Norris Cole latched a hand on West's groin area as he tried to slip through West. Wade received a retroactive flagrant foul for hitting Stephenson in the head, another incident that the Pacers, notably Paul George, felt was a dirty play. The Heat survived game 1 on a James game-winning layup, while the Pacers came back to tie the series at 1–1 after forcing James into two late fourth-quarter turnovers for game 2. In game 3, the Heat set a team record for points in a postseason half with 70. It was the first time the Pacers had given up 70 points since 1992. Allen's single turnover was the least ever suffered by the Heat in a first half. Their five total turnovers is tied for the fewest in franchise history. The game 3 victory marked the first time that an NBA team had won five straight road games by double digits. The Heat won the series 4–3, with a 99–76 win in game 7. In the 2014 NBA playoffs, after beating the Brooklyn Nets in five games, and the Pacers beating the Washington Wizards in six games, the Heat and the first-seeded Pacers would meet up in the Eastern Conference finals in a much-anticipated rematch. The Heat would go on to eliminate the Pacers 4–2, advancing to their fourth consecutive NBA Finals in the Big Three-era. The Heat stumbled during game 1 in Indianapolis, falling 107–96. They would win the next three games, but during game 5, which Miami lost 93–90, James struggled, suffering heavy foul trouble and scoring only seven points, his lowest playoff record. During game 6 in Miami, the Heat would defeat the Pacers 117–92.

=== Dallas Mavericks ===
The Heat–Mavericks rivalry began in the 2006 NBA Finals, where the two teams met and both entering their first NBA Finals appearance. A year prior, the Heat had acquired Shaquille O'Neal. The Mavericks were led by Dirk Nowitzki, and the Heat were led by Dwyane Wade. Dallas had home-court advantage in the series due to a better regular season record (60–22) than Miami's (52–30) and took the first two games in the series, entering game 3 with a commanding 2–0 lead. They looked set to win game 3 until a rally by the Heat, including many free throws from Wade, resulted in the Mavericks losing the third game. The Heat won all of its home games, as the Mavericks dropped games 3, 4 and 5. In a highly controversial game 5, a 101–100 victory for the Heat, Wade shot more free throws than the entire Mavericks team. Mavericks owner Mark Cuban, as well as Nowitzki, were both fined for acts of misconduct. During game 6, the series returned to Dallas, where the Mavericks fell 95–92. Jason Terry airballed a three-point attempt that could have tied the game. Wade picked up the ball, throwing it in the air in celebration as the Heat won the NBA Championship, and its first one as well. Wade was named the Finals MVP.

In the 2010 off-season, Miami acquired LeBron James from the Cleveland Cavaliers and Chris Bosh from the Toronto Raptors to team up with Wade and form their own "big three" (to rival the Celtics' big three) that was expected to win the championship. The Heat finished 58–24, acquiring the southeast division title and the second seed in the Eastern Conference. During the regular season, the Mavericks swept the Heat 2–0. The Heat cruised through the Playoffs without much competition, eliminating every team – the Philadelphia 76ers, defending Eastern Conference champions Boston Celtics and the top-seeded Chicago Bulls all five games. Meanwhile, the Mavericks had tallied 57–25 for the third seed, leaving them to face the Portland Trail Blazers in the first round. The Mavericks had been defeated in the first round all but one time since the 2006 Finals, including a defeat from the seventh-seeded San Antonio Spurs just the previous season. Because of this, the Mavericks were underdogs throughout the playoffs, but they were able to dispatch Portland in six games. They faced the defending NBA champions Los Angeles Lakers and pulled off the impossible by sweeping them, ending their bid for a three-peat. In the conference finals, they defeated the Oklahoma City Thunder, resulting a rematch between the two teams. After taking a 2–1 lead however, the Heat stumbled in the next three games. They were eliminated on their own home floor after losing 105–95 during game 6 in Miami – extending LeBron's quest for a ring. The loss had also brought further public humiliation for LeBron James, who had been scrutinized and negatively criticized for leaving the Cavaliers to join the Heat. LeBron was criticized for only averaging 17.8 points. Cavaliers fans rejoiced in the Heat's loss due to the anger that was caused by LeBron's decision to join the Heat, which they felt was unfair and a betrayal.

After that, the Mavericks would never win another game against the Heat. Dallas hosted the Heat for the season opener on December 25, 2011, of the lockout-shortened 2011–12 season that was shortened to 66 games. The Heat spoiled the Mavericks' championship banner-raising night, giving them a 105–94 loss.

Although the Heat and the Mavericks have not met in the postseason ever since, the rivalry continued as Mark Cuban publicly discussed his extreme personal dislike for the Heat. He described "hate" was not being strong enough of a word to describe his dislike for the Heat. He also had a personal dislike for Wade.

== Season-by-season record ==
List of the last five seasons completed by the Heat. For the full season-by-season history, see List of Miami Heat seasons.

Note: GP = Games played, W = Wins, L = Losses, W–L% = Winning percentage

Season	GP	W	L	W–L%	Finish	Playoffs
2021–22	82	53	29	.646	1st, Southeast	Lost in conference finals, 3–4 (Celtics)
2022–23	82	44	38	.537	1st, Southeast	Lost in NBA Finals, 1–4 (Nuggets)
2023–24	82	46	36	.561	2nd, Southeast	Lost in first round, 1–4 (Celtics)
2024–25	82	37	45	.451	3rd, Southeast	Lost in first round, 0–4 (Cavaliers)
2025–26	82	43	39	.524	4th, Southeast	Did not qualify

== Home arenas ==
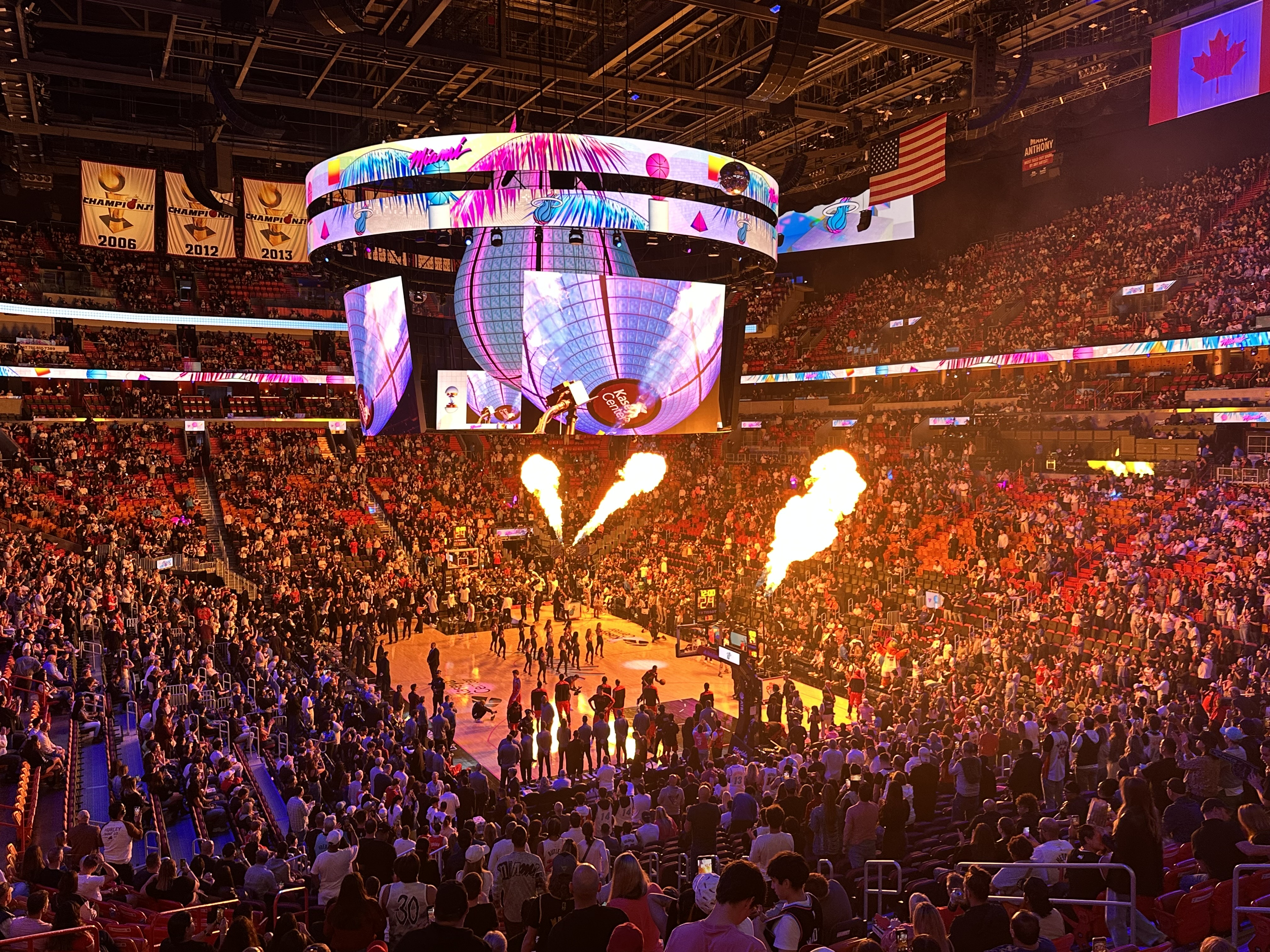
Kaseya Center prior to a Miami Heat game during the 2024–25 season.

Duration	Arena
November 5, 1988–December 28, 1999	Miami Arena
January 2, 2000–present	Kaseya Center

== Radio and television ==
The Heat's flagship radio stations are WAXY (790 AM) in English, with Mike Inglis, former Heat coach Ron Rothstein, and former WNBA player Ruth Riley calling games, and WQBA (1140 AM) in Spanish, with Jose Pañeda and Joe Pujala on the call.

As of the 2026–27 NBA season, Heat games not on national television will be carried on broadcast television and streaming, with WPLG as flagship station, and WPLG-provided streaming within Miami–Dade, Broward and Monroe counties on the Local 10+ Platinum app; the team also affiliated with WTCN-CD/Palm Beach and WINK-DT3/Fort Myers. Games are called by Eric Reid and John Crotty; Reid has been part of the Heat's broadcasting team since the beginning of the franchise, first serving as a color analyst, and later becoming the lead play-by-play voice starting in the 1991–92 season. For the first four years of the franchise, there were radio-television simulcasts of locally broadcast games before the franchise eventually created separate broadcast teams.

WBFS-TV (channel 33) was the original over-the-air flagship station for Heat games, with its first stint concluding at the end of the 1998–99 season, after 11 seasons. WAMI-TV (channel 69) took over the following season; however, WBFS (along with now-sister station WFOR channel 4) returned as the Heat's primary over-the-air home in 2000–01, this time lasting until the 2003–04 season. On the cable side, Heat games were televised on then-SportsChannel Florida (now FanDuel Sports Network Florida), before moving to then-Sunshine Network (now FanDuel Sports Network Sun) starting in the 1992–93 season. From 2004–05 to 2025–26, the channel served as the exclusive regional carrier of Heat games throughout the team's designated broadcast territory, which includes the metropolitan areas of Miami–Fort Lauderdale, West Palm Beach–Fort Pierce–Port St. Lucie, and Fort Myers–Naples.

From 1988 to 1993, the Heat were on WQAM. WINZ previously aired games from 1993 to 1996 and WIOD did from 1996 to 2008.

== Personnel ==
=== Current roster ===
Miami Heat roster
Players

Pos.	No.	Player	Height	Weight	DOB	From
F/C	13	Bam Adebayo	6 ft 9 in (2.06 m)	260 lb (118 kg)	1997-07-18	Kentucky
F	7	Giannis Antetokounmpo	6 ft 11 in (2.11 m)	250 lb (113 kg)	1994-12-06	Greece
G	4	Ryan Conwell	6 ft 2 in (1.88 m)	215 lb (98 kg)	2004-06-15	Louisville
G	24	Tre Donaldson (TW)	6 ft 1 in (1.85 m)	200 lb (91 kg)	2003-12-11	Miami (FL)
F	0	Simone Fontecchio	6 ft 7 in (2.01 m)	220 lb (100 kg)	1995-12-09	Italy
F	15	Myron Gardner	6 ft 5 in (1.96 m)	225 lb (102 kg)	2001-05-21	Little Rock
C	50	Vladislav Goldin (TW)	7 ft 0 in (2.13 m)	255 lb (116 kg)	2001-05-12	Michigan
G	10	Tim Hardaway Jr.	6 ft 6 in (1.98 m)	205 lb (93 kg)	1992-03-16	Michigan
F	16	Keshad Johnson (TW)	6 ft 6 in (1.98 m)	230 lb (104 kg)	2001-06-23	Arizona
F	5	Nikola Jović	6 ft 10 in (2.08 m)	245 lb (111 kg)	2003-06-09	Serbia
G	9	Pelle Larsson	6 ft 5 in (1.96 m)	215 lb (98 kg)	2001-02-23	Arizona
G	2	Davion Mitchell	6 ft 0 in (1.83 m)	200 lb (91 kg)	1998-09-05	Baylor
F	95	Bobby Portis	6 ft 9 in (2.06 m)	250 lb (113 kg)	1995-02-10	Arkansas
C	8	Nick Richards	6 ft 11 in (2.11 m)	255 lb (116 kg)	1997-11-29	Kentucky
G	12	Dru Smith	6 ft 2 in (1.88 m)	200 lb (91 kg)	1997-12-30	Missouri
G/F	11	Klay Thompson	6 ft 6 in (1.98 m)	220 lb (100 kg)	1990-02-08	Washington State
F	22	Andrew Wiggins	6 ft 7 in (2.01 m)	210 lb (95 kg)	1995-02-23	Kansas

Coaches
Head coach
- Erik Spoelstra
Assistant(s)
- Malik Allen
- Vin Baker
- Caron Butler
- Octavio De La Grana
- Wayne Ellington
- Eric Glass
- Chris Quinn

Legend
- (DP) Unsigned draft pick
- (FA) Free agent
- (S) Suspended
- (GL) On assignment to G League affiliate
- (TW) Two-way affiliate player
- Injured

Roster
Updated: October 17, 2026

=== Retained draft rights ===
The Heat hold the draft rights to the following unsigned draft picks who have been playing outside the NBA. A drafted player, either an international draftee or a college draftee who is not signed by the team that drafted him, is allowed to sign with any non-NBA teams. In this case, the team retains the player's draft rights in the NBA until one year after the player's contract with the non-NBA team ends. This list includes draft rights that were acquired from trades with other teams.

Draft	Round	Pick	Player	Pos.	Nationality	Current team	Note(s)	Ref

=== Basketball Hall of Famers ===
Miami Heat Hall of Famers
Players
No.	Name	Position	Tenure	Inducted
20	Gary Payton	G	2005–2007	2013
33	Alonzo Mourning	C/F	1995–2003; 2005–2008	2014
32	Shaquille O'Neal	C	2004–2008	2016
34	Ray Allen	G	2012–2014	2018
1	Chris Bosh ^{1}	F	2010–2017	2021
10	Tim Hardaway	G	1996–2001	2022
3	Dwyane Wade ^{2}	G	2003–2016; 2018–2019	2023
5	Amar'e Stoudemire	F/C	2015–2016	2026
Coaches
Name		Position	Tenure	Inducted
Pat Riley		Head coach	1995–2003; 2005–2008	2008
Contributors
Name		Position	Tenure	Inducted
Micky Arison		Owner	1995–present	2025

Notes:

- ^{1} In total, Bosh was inducted into the Hall of Fame twice—as player and as a member of the 2008 Olympic team.
- ^{2} In total, Wade was inducted into the Hall of Fame twice—as player and as a member of the 2008 Olympic team.

=== FIBA Hall of Famers ===
Miami Heat Hall of Famers
Players
No.	Name	Position	Tenure	Inducted
32	Shaquille O'Neal	C	2004–2008	2017
33	Alonzo Mourning	C/F	1995–2003; 2005–2008	2019
20	Kirk Penney	G	2003	2024
15	Wang Zhizhi	C	2003–2005	2026

=== Retired numbers ===
The Heat have retired seven numbers, although only six of the players played for the franchise. Michael Jordan was the first player to be honored despite not having played for the Heat. Pat Riley retired Jordan's signature No. 23 before his final game in Miami during the 2002–03 season as a tribute to his career.

During the 2005–06 season the organization honored Pro Football Hall of Fame quarterback Dan Marino's No. 13 in respect of his contributions to the National Football League (NFL)'s Miami Dolphins. However, the No. 13 jersey is not retired and is still available for use by the Heat players. Currently, no. 13 is being worn be Allstar center Bam Adebayo.

The NBA retired Bill Russell's No. 6 for all its member teams on August 11, 2022.

Miami Heat retired numbers
No.	Player	Position	Tenure	Date
1	Chris Bosh	F	2010–2017	March 26, 2019
3	Dwyane Wade	G	2003–2016; 2018–2019	February 22, 2020
10 (Note: In 2026, an exception was made in order to allow Hardaway's retired number 10 to be issued to his son Tim Hardaway Jr.)	Tim Hardaway	G	1996–2001	October 28, 2009
23	Michael Jordan	G	—	April 11, 2003
32	Shaquille O'Neal	C	2004–2008	December 22, 2016
33	Alonzo Mourning	C	1995–2003; 2005–2008	March 30, 2009
40	Udonis Haslem	F	2003–2023	January 19, 2024

== Head coaches ==
There have been six head coaches for the Miami Heat. Ron Rothstein was the franchise's first head coach, serving from 1988 through 1991; he remains as assistant coach. Kevin Loughery was his successor from 1991 to 1995, guiding the Heat to their first two playoff berths in 1992 and 1994. Loughery was fired 46 games into the 1994–95 season, posting a 17–29 record. Alvin Gentry, an assistant coach who joined in 1991, was brought in to replace Loughery on an interim basis. Miami went 15–21 for the final 36 games, and Gentry moved to the Detroit Pistons the following season.

In the summer of 1995, owner Micky Arison hired Pat Riley as the head coach and team president. Upon suffering a 25–57 record in the 2002–03 season, Riley abruptly announced his retirement, but remained as team president. He elevated assistant coach Stan Van Gundy as his replacement. Van Gundy is Miami's all-time leader for the highest winning percentage in the regular season (.605), having led Miami to a 42–40 record in his first season and a 59–23 record in his second year. He spearheaded Miami's 2005 campaign, where they held the top seed in the east, swept their first two playoff opponents and made it to the conference finals.

An 11–10 record early into the 2005–06 season prompted Riley to come out of retirement and replace Van Gundy. Shortly thereafter, Riley would win his fifth and final championship as a head coach, as well as Miami's first championship in 2006. Riley would retire permanently following the 15-win 2007–08 season, but once again remained as team president. His hand-picked replacement, longtime assistant Erik Spoelstra, is the current Heat head coach, a position he has held since 2008. At 38, he was the youngest head coach in the league at the time, as well as the first Filipino-American head coach in league history. Spoelstra led the team to four consecutive appearances in the NBA Finals, culminating in back-to-back championships in 2012 and 2013.

== Franchise accomplishments and awards ==
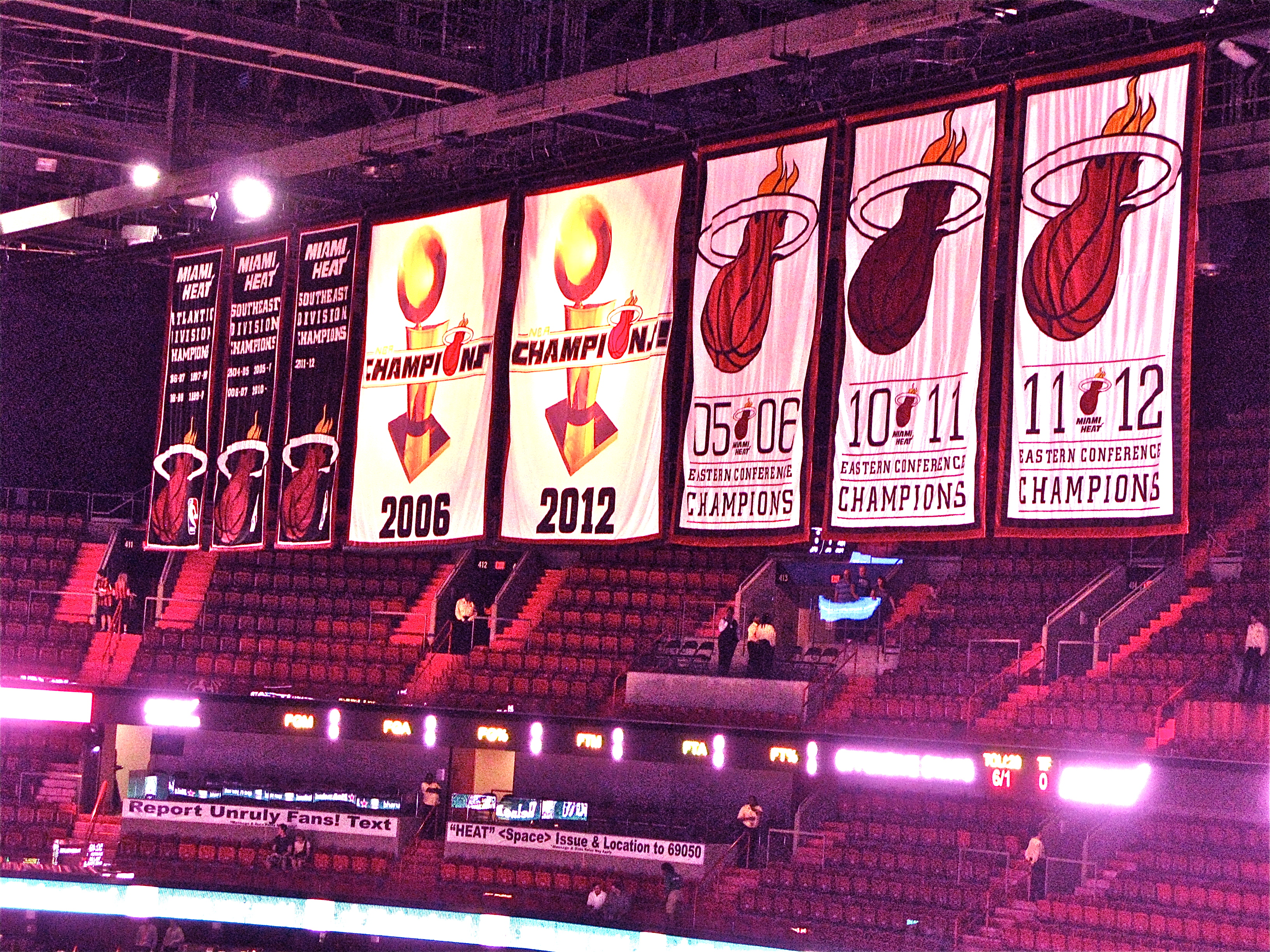
Miami Heat championship banners prior to the 2012–13 season.

=== Franchise leaders ===
Bold denotes still active with team. Italic denotes still active but not with team.

Points scored (regular season) as of the end of the 2025–26 season

1. Dwyane Wade (21,556)
2. **Bam Adebayo** (10,391)
3. Alonzo Mourning (9,459)
4. Glen Rice (9,248)
5. LeBron James (7,919)
6. **Tyler Herro** (7,664)
7. Chris Bosh (6,914)
8. Rony Seikaly (6,742)
9. Jimmy Butler (6,630)
10. Udonis Haslem (6,586)
11. Goran Dragić (6,348)
12. Tim Hardaway (6,335)
13. Eddie Jones (6,194)
14. Grant Long (5,473)
15. Duncan Robinson (4,798)
16. Mario Chalmers (4,641)
17. Hassan Whiteside (4,554)
18. Kevin Edwards (4,362)
19. Bimbo Coles (4,031)
20. Shaquille O'Neal (4,010)
21. Josh Richardson (3,591)
22. Brian Grant (3,433)
23. Michael Beasley (2,927)
24. Steve Smith (2,905)
25. Jamal Mashburn (2,835)
26. Tyler Johnson (2,824)
27. Voshon Lenard (2,804)
28. P. J. Brown (2,803)
29. Kelly Olynyk (2,640)
30. **Jaime Jaquez Jr.** (2,611)
31. Sherman Douglas (2,544)
32. James Johnson (2,293)
33. Willie Burton (2,252)
34. Billy Thompson (2,220)
35. Justise Winslow (2,181)
36. Dan Majerle (2,019)
37. Jason Williams (1,980)
38. Luol Deng (1,918)
39. Max Strus (1,880)
40. Caleb Martin (1,874)
41. Keith Askins (1,852)
42. Kendrick Nunn (1,840)
43. Caron Butler (1,824)
44. Kyle Lowry (1,762)
45. Harold Miner (1,740)
46. Wayne Ellington (1,721)
47. Dion Waiters (1,713)
48. Norris Cole (1,708)
49. Antoine Walker (1,660)
50. Billy Owens (1,592)

Other statistics (regular season) as of the end of the 2025–26 season

Most minutes played
Player	Minutes
Dwyane Wade	32,912
Udonis Haslem	21,719
**Bam Adebayo**	19,719
Alonzo Mourning	17,700
Glen Rice	17,059
Grant Long	14,859
Mario Chalmers	14,571
Rony Seikaly	14,208
Eddie Jones	14,097
Tim Hardaway	13,271

Most rebounds
Player	Rebounds
Udonis Haslem	5,791
**Bam Adebayo**	5,756
Alonzo Mourning	4,807
Rony Seikaly	4,544
Dwyane Wade	4,482
Hassan Whiteside	3,870
Grant Long	3,281
Chris Bosh	2,816
Brian Grant	2,654
Glen Rice	2,363

Most assists
Player	Assists
Dwyane Wade	5,009
**Bam Adebayo**	2,276
Goran Dragić	2,034
Tim Hardaway	2,867
Mario Chalmers	2,004
LeBron James	1,980
Bimbo Coles	1,961
Jimmy Butler	1,789
**Tyler Herro**	1,596
Sherman Douglas	1,262

Most steals
Player	Steals
Dwyane Wade	1,433
Mario Chalmers	791
Grant Long	666
**Bam Adebayo**	693
Glen Rice	572
Kevin Edwards	560
Tim Hardaway	541
Jimmy Butler	528
Eddie Jones	515
LeBron James	489

Most blocks
Player	Blocks
Alonzo Mourning	1,625
Dwyane Wade	812
Hassan Whiteside	783
Rony Seikaly	610
**Bam Adebayo**	538
Joel Anthony	456
Shaquille O'Neal	384
Chris Bosh	332
P. J. Brown	305
Udonis Haslem	252

Most three-pointers made
Player	3-pointers made
Duncan Robinson	1,202
**Tyler Herro**	1,068
Tim Hardaway	806
Eddie Jones	712
Glen Rice	708
Mario Chalmers	657
Goran Dragić	588
Josh Richardson	491
Dwyane Wade	481
Voshon Lenard	473

=== Individual awards ===
NBA Most Valuable Player

- LeBron James – 2012, 2013

NBA Eastern Conference Finals MVP

- Jimmy Butler – 2023

NBA Finals MVP

- Dwyane Wade – 2006
- LeBron James – 2012, 2013

NBA Scoring Champion

- Dwyane Wade – 2009

NBA Defensive Player of the Year

- Alonzo Mourning – 1999, 2000

NBA Most Improved Player Award

- Rony Seikaly – 1990
- Isaac Austin – 1997

NBA Sixth Man of the Year

- Tyler Herro – 2022

Best NBA Player ESPY Award

- Dwyane Wade – 2006
- LeBron James – 2012, 2013

NBA Coach of the Year

- Pat Riley – 1997

NBA Executive of the Year

- Pat Riley – 2011

J. Walter Kennedy Citizenship Award

- P. J. Brown – 1997
- Alonzo Mourning – 2002

Twyman–Stokes Teammate of the Year Award

- Shane Battier – 2014

NBA Community Assist Award

- Dwyane Wade – 2013

Kareem Abdul-Jabbar Social Justice Champion Award

- Bam Adebayo – 2026

All-NBA First Team

- Tim Hardaway – 1997
- Alonzo Mourning – 1999
- Shaquille O'Neal – 2005, 2006
- Dwyane Wade – 2009, 2010
- LeBron James – 2011–2014

All-NBA Second Team

- Tim Hardaway – 1998, 1999
- Alonzo Mourning – 2000
- Dwyane Wade – 2005, 2006, 2011
- Jimmy Butler – 2023

All-NBA Third Team

- Dwyane Wade – 2007, 2012, 2013
- Jimmy Butler – 2020, 2021

NBA All-Defensive First Team

- Alonzo Mourning – 1999, 2000
- LeBron James – 2011–2013
- Bam Adebayo – 2024

NBA All-Defensive Second Team

- P. J. Brown – 1997, 1999
- Bruce Bowen – 2001
- Dwyane Wade – 2005, 2009, 2010
- LeBron James – 2014
- Hassan Whiteside – 2016
- Bam Adebayo – 2020–2023, 2026
- Jimmy Butler – 2021

NBA All-Rookie First Team

- Sherman Douglas – 1990
- Steve Smith – 1992
- Caron Butler – 2003
- Dwyane Wade – 2004
- Michael Beasley – 2009
- Kendrick Nunn – 2020
- Jaime Jaquez Jr. – 2024

NBA All-Rookie Second Team

- Kevin Edwards – 1989
- Glen Rice – 1990
- Willie Burton – 1991
- Udonis Haslem – 2004
- Mario Chalmers – 2009
- Justise Winslow – 2016
- Tyler Herro – 2020
- Kel'el Ware – 2025

Season-long NBA Community Assist Award

- Dwyane Wade – 2013

=== NBA All-Star Weekend ===
NBA All-Star selections

- Dwyane Wade – 2005–2016, 2019
- Chris Bosh – 2011–2016
- Alonzo Mourning – 1996, 1997, 2000–2002
- LeBron James – 2011–2014
- Bam Adebayo – 2020, 2023, 2024
- Shaquille O'Neal – 2005–2007
- Jimmy Butler – 2020, 2022
- Tim Hardaway – 1997, 1998
- Goran Dragić – 2018
- Tyler Herro – 2025
- Anthony Mason – 2001
- Norman Powell – 2026

NBA All-Star Game head coaches

- Stan Van Gundy – 2005
- Erik Spoelstra – 2013, 2022

NBA All-Star Game MVP

- Dwyane Wade – 2010

NBA All-Star Skills Challenge Champion

- Dwyane Wade – 2006, 2007
- Bam Adebayo – 2020

NBA All-Star Three-point Shootout Champion

- Glen Rice – 1995
- Jason Kapono – 2007
- Daequan Cook – 2009
- James Jones – 2011
- Tyler Herro – 2025

NBA All-Star Slam Dunk Contest Champion

- Harold Miner – 1993, 1995
- Derrick Jones Jr. – 2020
- Keshad Johnson – 2026

NBA All-Star Shooting Stars Contest Champion

- Chris Bosh – 2013–2015

Preceded by San Antonio Spurs	NBA champions 2005–06	Succeeded by San Antonio Spurs
Preceded by Dallas Mavericks	NBA champions 2011–12, 2012–13	Succeeded by San Antonio Spurs
