= Barth (name) =

Barth is both a masculine given name and a surname, a variation of Bart, a pet form of Bartelmew.

Notable people with the name include:

== Given name ==
- Barth S. Cronin (1858–1933), American politician
- Barth A. Green, American neurosurgeon
- Barth Netterfield (born 1968), Canadian astrophysicist
- Barth Jules Sussman, American novelist

== Surname ==
- Barth (surname)

== See also ==
- Barth (disambiguation)
