= Barth =

Barth may refer to:

== Places ==
- Barth, Germany, a town in Mecklenburg-Western Pomerania, Germany
  - Barth (Amt), administrative subdivision
- Barth Island, Nunavut, Canada

== Other uses ==
- Barth (name), a surname and a given name (and list of people with that name)
- Barth Bagge, a character from the television show "You Can't Do That on Television"
- Barth Classic, a golf tournament on the LPGA Tour from 1974 to 1980

== See also ==
- Barth syndrome, a metabolic disorder
- Barthes (disambiguation)
- Barthe (disambiguation)
