= Miami Project to Cure Paralysis =

US research center

- Founded: 1985
- Founder: Nick Buoniconti and Barth A. Green
- Type: Medical
- Purpose: Spinal cord injury and brain damage
- Location: Miami, Florida, U.S.
- Coordinates: 25°47′18.74″N 80°12′44.57″W
- Region served: Global
- Owner: University of Miami
- Key people: Marc A. Buoniconti, President; W. Dalton Dietrich, Scientific Director; Suzanne M. Sayfie, Executive Director; Diana C. Berning, Administrative Director
- Revenue: $23 million
- Employees: 250
- Website: www.themiamiproject.org

The Miami Project to Cure Paralysis is a spinal cord injury research center and a designated Center of Excellence at the University of Miami's Miller School of Medicine in Miami, Florida.

The Miami Project was co-founded in 1985 by Barth A. Green and Pro Football Hall of Fame linebacker Nick Buoniconti after Buoniconti's son, Marc, sustained a spinal cord injury during a college football game. The Miami Project's international team is housed in the Lois Pope LIFE Center and includes more than 250 scientists, researchers and clinicians.

== Clinical trials ==
In July 2012, The Miami Project was granted approval by the U.S. FDA to proceed with a Schwann cell implantation clinical trial. In November 2012, doctors from the University of Miami implanted the first patient with his own Schwann cells, initiating phase 1 of the trial, a test of the safety and efficacy of the technique.

== Buoniconti Fund ==
The Buoniconti family established The Buoniconti Fund to Cure Paralysis in 1992, a non-profit organization devoted to assisting The Miami Project.

== Lois Pope LIFE Center ==
The center is located in the Schoninger research quadrangle at the University of Miami's Jackson Memorial Medical Center. It was named in honor of Lois Pope, who donated $10 million toward its construction, and of her charity Leaders in Furthering Education (LIFE).

The building opened on October 26, 2000. Pope's gift also funds 20 LIFE Fellows for neurological research. The six-story 180,000 sq ft (17,000 m^{2}) building cost $28 million and was designed by MGE Architects. The block of Northwest 11th Avenue in Miami in front of the building has been named Buoniconti Drive.
