= Marcelle Barthe =

Canadian writer (1904–1964)

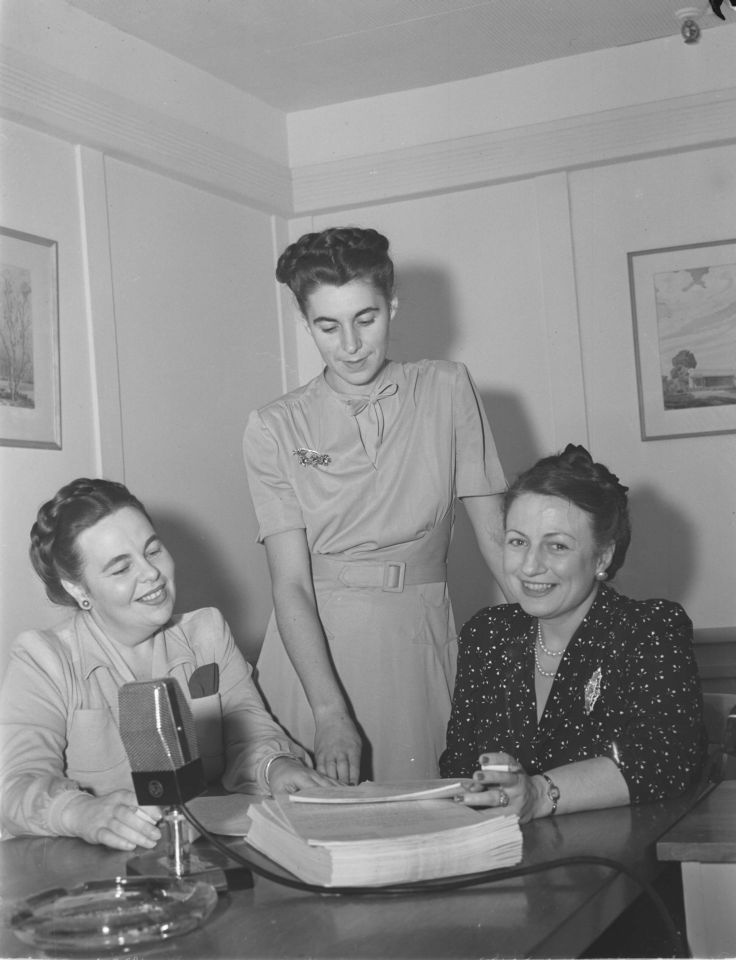
- Born: September 26, 1904; Ottawa
- Died: November 24, 1964 (aged 60); Montreal

Marcelle Barthe (26 September 1904 – 24 November 1964) was a Canadian radio personality and writer.

Born in Ottawa, Ontario, Canada, Barthe studied at the convent of the Congrégation Notre-Dame in Ottawa. She co-founded "La Rampe", a dramatic society in Ottawa, in 1929, and graduated from the University of Ottawa with a diploma in music and speech. Barthe performed in stage plays until at least 1938.

Barthe was Armand Lavergne's secretary from 1930 to 1935.

Barthe began her radio career in 1933 on CKCH's daily women's program Pour vous Mesdames, under the pseudonym Françoise. The role made her the first bilingual woman employed as an announcer on the channel. At the same time, she wrote, directed, and starred in a variety of children's programs for the station.

She was the CBC's first female bilingual announcer.

She was a CBC Radio commentator for the 1939 royal tour of King George VI and 1951 royal tour of Princess Elizabeth and her husband, the Duke of Edinburgh.

Prior to the Second World War, she travelled to Europe to study other national radio in countries including France, England, and Italy.

Marcelle-Barthe Park in Montreal is named after her; it's located on Wolfe Street, between Ontario Street and Robin Street. Saint-Bruno-de-Montarville, Quebec's rue Marcelle-Barthe is also named after her.
