= Barthez =

Barthez is a surname. Notable people with the surname include:

- Fabien Barthez (born 1971), French FIFA World Cup winning goalkeeper
- Guillaume Barthez de Marmorières (1707–1799) French civil engineer, father of:
- Paul Joseph Barthez (1734–1806), French physician, physiologist, and encyclopaedist
- Barthez Battalion, a group of fictional characters in the popular Beyblade anime and manga series

== See also ==
- Barthezz, a pseudonym for Dutch trance music DJ Bart Claessen (born 1980)
