= Clardeluna =

Writer in Occitan language (1898–1972)

Clardeluna (Occitan pronunciation: [ˌklaɾðeˈlyno̞]) was the pen name of Occitan poet, playwright and journalist Joana Barthes. She was born in 1898 in Cazedarnes in Hérault, France and died in 1972. She ran the Trencavel magazine. "Clar de luna" translates as "moonlight" in English.

== Works ==
=== Poetry ===
- Escriveta, 1926
- L'Imatgièr, 1927
- Lo Miralh magic, 1968
- Lo Miralh del temps, 1968

=== Drama ===
- Las Gentilhas, 1928
- En Velhant lo mòrt, 1933
- Las Lofas frejas, 1933
- La Nuèit d'estiu, 1938
