= Barth A. Green =

American neurosurgeon

Barth Armand Green is an American neurosurgeon who is professor and chairman of the Department of Neurological Surgery at the University of Miami's Miller School of Medicine in Miami. He is also the co-founder of Project Medishare for Haiti, with Art Fournier.

Green specializes in spinal cord injury. He co-founded the Miami Project to Cure Paralysis, one of the world's largest spinal cord injury research centers, with the Buoniconti family. He is also the cofounder of the University of Miami's Global Institute for Community Health and Development, which is a program dedicated to service healthcare development in the Western Hemisphere.

== Personal life ==
Green is married has two sons and a daughter. His daughter Jenna is married to Nick Arison of the Arison family.

== Areas of interest ==
His areas of interest include translational research for spinal cord injury, including cellular transplantation and neural tissue protection, especially as it applies to mild hypothermia. He also specializes in the surgical management of spinal cord injury and diseases, including spinal cord tumors, myelopathy, tethered spinal cords, Chiari 1 Malformation and syringomyelia.

Green has co-authored numerous articles on a variety of topics related to his research interests.
