= Édouard Barthe =

French politician (1882–1949)

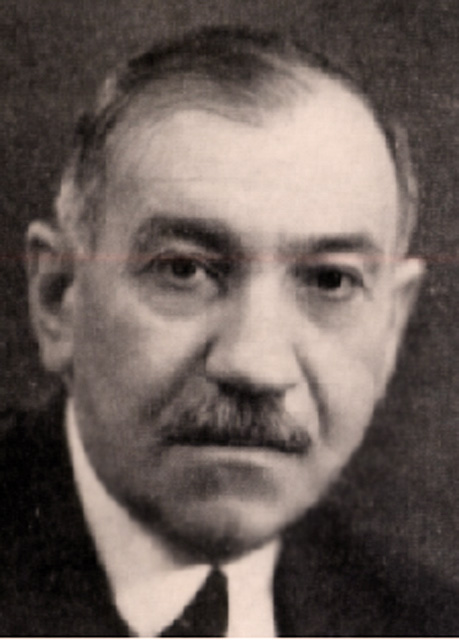
Édouard Barthe

Édouard Barthe (26 May 1882, in Béziers – 25 July 1949, in Paris) was a French politician. He represented the French Section of the Workers' International (SFIO) from 1910 to 1933, the Socialist Party of France – Jean Jaurès Union from 1933 to 1935 and the Socialist Republican Union (USR) from 1935 to 1940 in the Chamber of Deputies. On 10 July 1940, he voted in favour of granting the Cabinet presided by Philippe Pétain authority to draw up a new constitution, thereby effectively ending the French Third Republic and establishing Vichy France. In 1941, he was made a member of the National Council of Vichy France. He was Senator from 1948 to 1949.
