= Project Medishare =

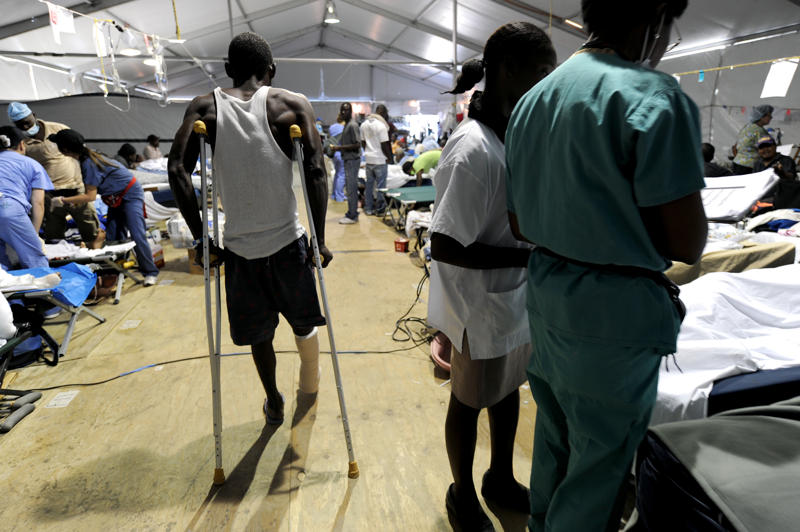
An earthquake survivor walks through a clinic set up by the University of Miami's Global Institute's Project Medishare in Port-au-Prince, Haiti, in February 2010

Project Medishare is a 501(c)(3), non-profit organization registered in Florida, United States. It was founded by Dr. Barth Green and Arthur Fournier from the University of Miami School of Medicine. The organization was created in 1994 to improve healthcare in Haiti. Since then, it has been committed to help its Haitian partners by establishing and funding sustainable programs, providing technology and equipment to hospitals, clinics, and other affiliated programs and training of Haitian physicians, nurses, and allied health professionals.

Project Medishare’s focus program include Community Health, Maternal Health, Child Health and Nutrition, and Medical Training and Education. The geographic areas served by the organization include Port-au-Prince and the Central Plateau in Haiti. The organization provides direct beneficiaries for more than 80,000 people every year.

== History ==
For assessing the healthcare situation in Haiti, Barth Green and Arthur Fournier founded Project Medishare for Haiti, Inc. in 1994. The first team of faculty was assembled by both the doctors from the Miller School of Medicine and the School of Nursing the University of Miami for exploring ways through which the health conditions of the Haitian people could be improved. After their first trip, the organization forged partnerships with allied health professionals and physicians for providing quality healthcare for the people of Haiti.

On January 12, 2010, when Haiti was struck by an earthquake, Dr. Green, along with a team of 11 doctors were the first to arrive for help. In less than 24 hours, a critical care hospital and 300 trauma beds were set up on the grounds of Port-au-Prince Airport by Project Medishare at the request of the Haitian President, René Préval. By June 2010, the organization had treated more than 30,000 earthquake victims.

After the earthquake, the organization expanded for building a tent hospital similar to a MASH unit. The field hospital then created is, as of today, one of the largest functioning urgent care hospitals in the country. The hospital has an emergency room, an intensive care unit, an operating room, and a pediatrics unit. It also has inpatient and outpatient operations.

== Voluntary work partners ==
Project Medishare accepts medical volunteers from all over the world. The following are the organization’s partners:

- Global Innovation Exchange
- Idealist
- Watsi
- George Washington School of Medicine and Health Sciences
- Jackson Health System
- Yéle Haiti Foundation
- Global Giving
- The Monsoon Diaries

== Fundraising and donations ==
On March 9, 2010, Carestream donated a Carestream ITX-560 mobile X-ray system, a wireless, battery-operated system for getting instant digital images for the local urgent care center. The system was donated through Project Medishare for the provision of medical assistance in Haiti.

National Basketball Association players Alonzo Mourning and Dwyane Wade founded the Athletes Relief Fund for Haiti and raised $800,000 in 2010 for Project Medishare to help improve the quality of life for the people of Haiti.

In January 2010, World Emblem International, Miami, donated services and products to Project Medishare. World Emblem also printed t-shirts with the “Save Haiti Saturday” and “Project Medishare” logos. Many restaurants and bars across the US also donated a percentage of their Saturday revenue for Save Haiti Saturday, a fundraising initiative for Project Medshare’s earthquake relief efforts.

United Way granted $40,000 grant to Project Medishare to continue to fund medical supplies and medical care in Haiti. Yéle Haiti Foundation partnered with Project Medishare to provide the first high-resolution CT Scanner in Haiti. The scanner was made available for all patients regardless of their financial resources.

A $5 million financial support from American Red Cross with $2 million additional funding enabled Hospital Bernard Mevs/Project Medishare to keep their doors open for the people in Haiti in need of services. An additional $3.6 million was donated to Project Medishare to support their relief efforts by the American Red Cross in 2012. The amount was used to cover costs, including operating expenses and administrative fees of critical care and trauma service facility in the country.

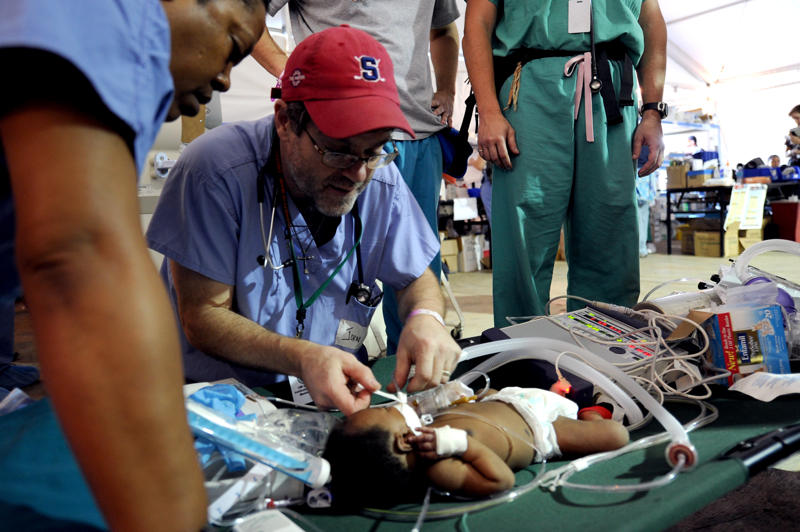
Respiratory technician John Rendle, with the University of Miami Global Institute's Project Medishare, provides medical assistance to an earthquake survivor in Port-au-Prince, Haiti.

Singer Justin Bieber donated a portion of all his proceeds from his album in 2012 to Project Medishare. He also performed at the Massey Hall for a charity fundraising show. The show was broadcast on MuchMusic and CTV and had raised $500,000. A considerable amount was donated to Project Medishare.

In August 2011, an exclusive line of Swarovski crystal-embellished bangles and tank tops was created by Pascal’s House of Blings as an initiative to raise funds for Project Medishare for people of Haiti. The items included Save Haiti exclusive bangle, signature Romero Britto designed tank tops, and Project Medishare tank tops. Since the earthquake hit Haiti, AmeriCares has been working closely with Project Medishare for providing the pharmacy, pediatric, and neonatal departments of Hôspital Bernard Mevs in Port-au-Prince. It has also provided medication and incubators to help treat vulnerable children.

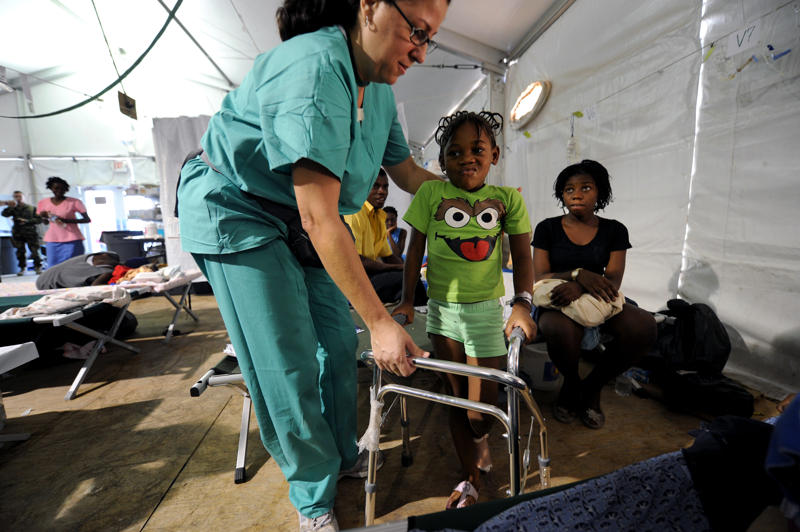
Physical therapist Marta Bloyer, with the University of Miami Global Institute's Project Medishare, helps an earthquake survivor walk in Port-au-Prince.

Major league baseball player Miguel Cabrera donated $900,000 to Project Medishare in January 2010. It helped in providing medical relief and support to the people affected by the earthquake in Haiti. The Sarah Jane Brain Foundation donated half of the proceeds from its fundraising reception and dinner held in February to Project Medishare.

Carnival Cruise Lines contributed $5 million to earthquake relief organizations in Haiti, which Project Medishare was a part of as well. It also shipped 2000 pounds of relief supplies to Project Medishare, which included water, blankets, diapers, and protein bars, and other non-perishable food items. On May 1, 2019, Project Medishare started a fundraiser as part of its 25th anniversary to continue helping and provide medical assistance for the people in Haiti.

== Contributions ==
In 2006, Project Medishare donated a generator to Haiti. In April 2010, a joint effort was made by Miami Dolphins and Sun Life Stadium Haiti Relief Fund with Project Medishare to help the Haitian families to connect with their families. Two communication facilities were established in Port au Prince and Little Haiti, enabling the Haitian family members to connect with their relatives in Miami. The videoconferencing platform used was Cisco TelePresence.

Project Medishare worked with the Hospital de la Paix in Port-au-Prince to establish a surgical training program, focused on training surgeons to repair clefts and treat burns. A pediatric neurosurgery training program was also initiated by the organization. The only critical-care and trauma hospital in Haiti was established by Project Medishare when the organization renovated the partially destroyed Hospital Bernard Mevs in Port-au-Prince. The hospital also includes a comprehensive rehabilitation component and a training program for Haitians.

More than 300 limbs have been made by the organization’s prosthetic program, and an amputee soccer program to reconnect the Haitians with their national sport is also created by Project Medishare. In July 2013, a breast cancer treatment program was launched in Port-au-Prince. The program was initiated to address the demand for breast cancer care in Haiti. Within two years, the organization was able to provide care to 139 patients with breast cancer.

== Mentions ==
The contributions and efforts of Project Medishare have been published on various notable platforms, including SciElo Public Health Journal, NCBI, Europe PMC, and, The New England Journal of Medicine.
