= Foreign policy of the Obama administration =

United States foreign policy (2009–2017)

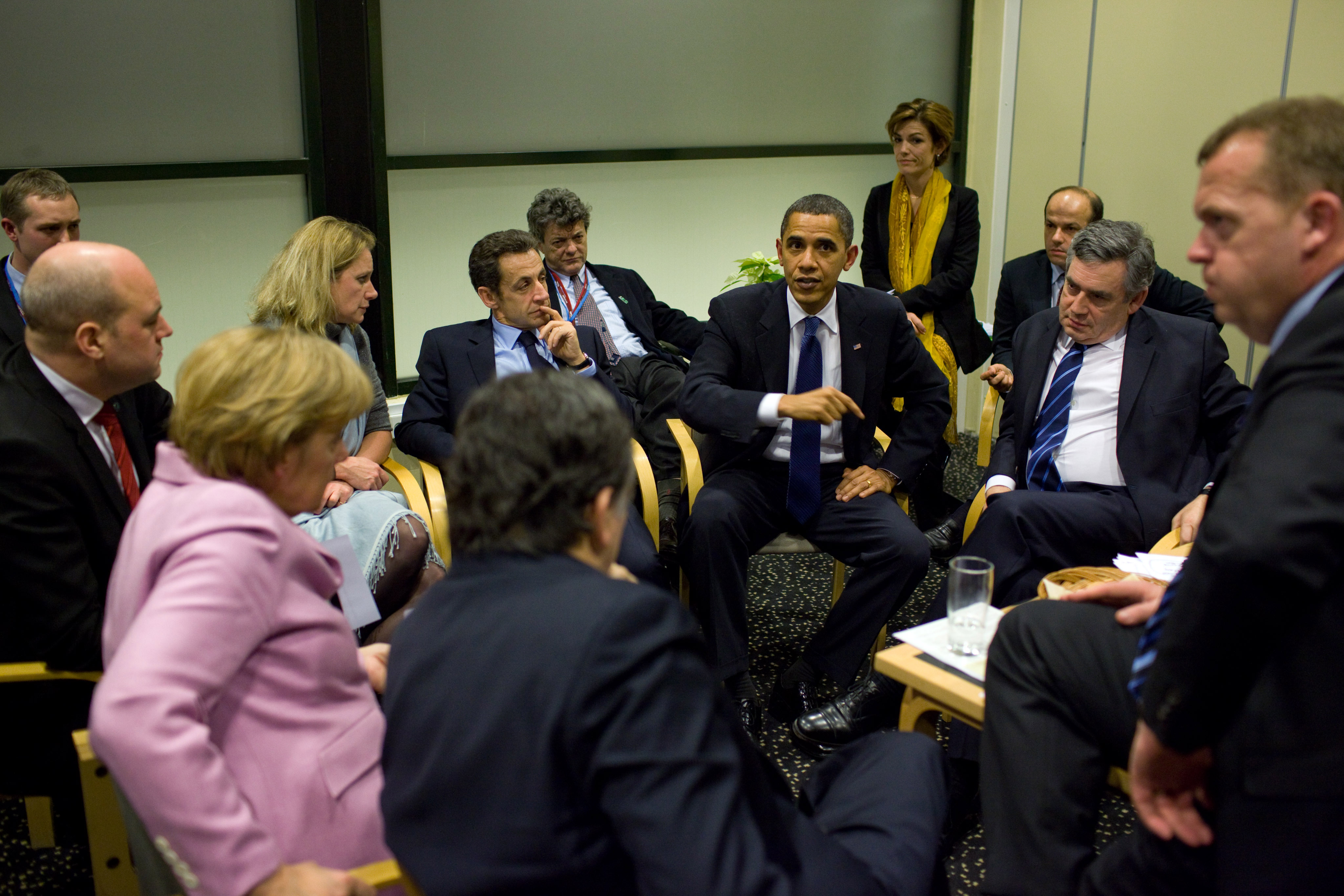
Obama briefing European leaders at the 2009 United Nations Climate Change Conference

The term Obama Doctrine is frequently used to describe the principles of US foreign policy under the Obama administration (2009–2017). He relied chiefly on his two highly experienced Secretaries of State—Hillary Clinton (2009–2013) and John Kerry (2013–2017)—and Vice President Joe Biden. Main themes include a reliance on negotiation and collaboration rather than confrontation or unilateralism.

Obama inherited the Iraq War, the Afghanistan War, and various aspects of the war on terror, all of which began during the Bush administration. He presided over the gradual draw down of U.S. soldiers in Iraq, culminating in the near-total withdrawal of U.S. soldiers from Iraq in December 2011. After increasing the U.S. military presence in Afghanistan during his first term, Obama withdrew all but approximately 8,400 soldiers from Afghanistan during his second term. In 2011, Obama presided over a mission that led to the death of Osama bin Laden, the organizer of the September 11 attacks. The number of prisoners at the Guantanamo Bay detention camp fell dramatically during Obama's tenure, but despite Obama's hopes to close the camp, 41 inmates remained at Guantanamo by the time Obama left office. The Obama administration made increased use of drone strikes, particularly in Pakistan, targeting alleged Al-Qaeda leaders such as Anwar al-Awlaki. In 2013, Edward Snowden revealed the existence of an extensive government surveillance program known as PRISM, which Obama defended as "a circumscribed, narrow system directed at us being able to protect our people."

In 2010, a series of protests across North Africa and the Middle East known as the Arab Spring broke out, eventually turning into more severe forms of unrest in several countries. Obama helped organize a NATO-led intervention in Libya, ultimately resulting in the fall of Muammar Gaddafi's regime. Obama allegedly declined to become deeply involved in the Syrian civil war between the government of Bashar al-Assad, the Syrian opposition, and the Salafi jihadist group known as ISIS. The U.S. supported the opposition throughout the civil war and occasionally executed strikes against ISIL. In 2014, after Russia annexed Crimea and intervened in Ukraine, Obama and other Western leaders imposed sanctions that contributed to a Russian financial crisis. Russia later intervened in the Syrian Civil War and was accused of interfering in the 2016 U.S. presidential election, which the Obama administration condemned.

Seeking to shift the focus of U.S. foreign policy to East Asia, Obama organized a multi-nation free trade agreement known as the Trans-Pacific Partnership (TPP), but the TPP was never ratified by Congress. Smaller trade agreements with South Korea, Colombia, and Panama were approved by Congress and entered into force. Obama initiated the Cuban thaw, providing diplomatic recognition to Cuba for the first time since the 1960s. His administration also negotiated the Joint Comprehensive Plan of Action, an accord in which Iran agreed to limit its nuclear program.

== History ==
=== Background ===
Obama gave his first major foreign policy speech of his campaign on April 23, 2007, to the Chicago Council on Global Affairs, in which he outlined his foreign policy objectives, stressing five key points:

1. "bringing a responsible end to this war in Iraq and refocusing on the critical challenges in the broader region,"
2. "by building the first truly 21st century military and showing wisdom in how we deploy it,"
3. "by marshalling a global effort to meet a threat that rises above all others in urgency – securing, destroying, and stopping the spread of weapons of mass destruction,"
4. "rebuild and construct the alliances and partnerships necessary to meet common challenges and confront common threats", and
5. "while America can help others build more secure societies, we must never forget that only the citizens of these nations can sustain them."

President-elect Obama nominated former rival, Senator Hillary Clinton to serve as his Secretary of State on December 1, 2008, and chose to keep Secretary of Defense Robert Gates as his Secretary of Defense. He appointed General James L. Jones to serve as his National Security Advisor and nominated Governor Janet Napolitano as Secretary of Homeland Security.

Clinton stated during her confirmation hearings that she believed that "the best way to advance America's interests in reducing global threats and seizing global opportunities is to design and implement global solutions." She stated, "We must use what has been called "smart power", the full range of tools at our disposal – diplomatic, economic, military, political, legal and cultural – picking the right tool or combination of tools for each situation. With smart power, diplomacy will be the vanguard of our foreign policy."

During the last weeks before his inauguration, in addition to the several major conflicts in the world, fighting related to the Israeli–Palestinian conflict erupted anew, specifically in Gaza, between Israel and the Hamas-led government. The 2008–2009 Israel–Gaza conflict ended in an uneasy cease-fire on January 18, 2009, two days prior to Obama's inauguration.

=== Initial themes ===
In his inaugural address, Obama, elaborating on his foreign policy, suggested that he hoped to begin the process of withdrawing from Iraq and continuing to focus on the conflict in Afghanistan. He also mentioned lessening the nuclear threat through "working tirelessly with old friends and former foes." He spoke about America's determination to combat terrorism by proclaiming that America's spirit is "stronger and cannot be broken – you cannot outlast us, and we will defeat you." To the Muslim world, Obama extended an invite to "a new way forward, based on mutual interest and mutual respect." He also said that the United States was willing to "extend a hand" to those "who cling to power through corruption and deceit" if they "are willing to unclench" their fists.

On his first full day as president, Obama called on Israel to open the borders of Gaza, detailing early plans on his administration's peace plans for the Israeli–Palestinian conflict. Obama and Secretary of State Clinton named George Mitchell as Special Envoy for Middle East peace and Richard Holbrooke as special representative to Pakistan and Afghanistan on January 23, 2009. The Mitchell appointment signaled that Clinton might stay away from the direct Secretary-level negotiating that her predecessor, Condoleezza Rice, had spent much effort on during the previous two years.

Within less than a week in her new position, Secretary of State Clinton already called almost 40 foreign leaders or foreign ministers. She said the world was eager to see a new American foreign policy and that, "There is a great exhalation of breath going on around the world. We've got a lot of damage to repair." She did indicate that not every past policy would be repudiated, and specifically said it was essential that the six-party talks over the North Korean nuclear weapons program continue.

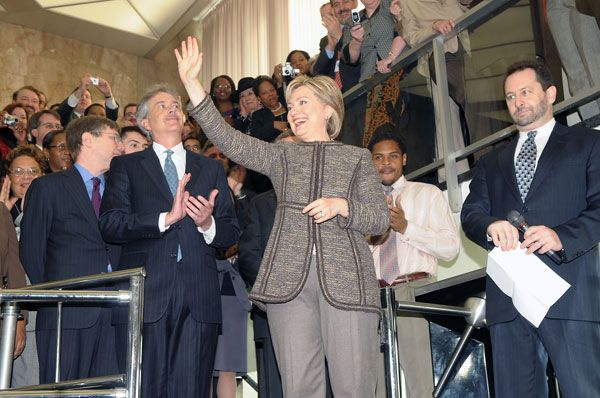
Secretary of State Hillary Clinton arrives at the State Department on her first day greeted by a standing room only crowd of Department employees.

His trip to Denmark, that failed to convince the International Olympic Committee to award the 2016 Summer Olympics to Chicago, made Denmark the sixteenth country Obama visited since becoming president on January 20, 2009. This edged out Presidents Gerald Ford and George H.W. Bush (both tied at 15 visits in their first year) to make Obama the most traveled first year President.

=== Appointments ===
The administration appointed, or allowed to remain in office, 2,465 ambassadors. Most were career diplomats. 805 were political appointees. 110 of 150 ambassadorships were political in the Caribbean; 259 out of 358 appointees in Western Europe were political. Career diplomats dominated all other areas including: North and Central America, South America, Africa, Eastern Europe, Middle East, East Asia, South Asia and Oceania. In Central Asia, all appointees were career.

Obama's 2013 foreign policy team

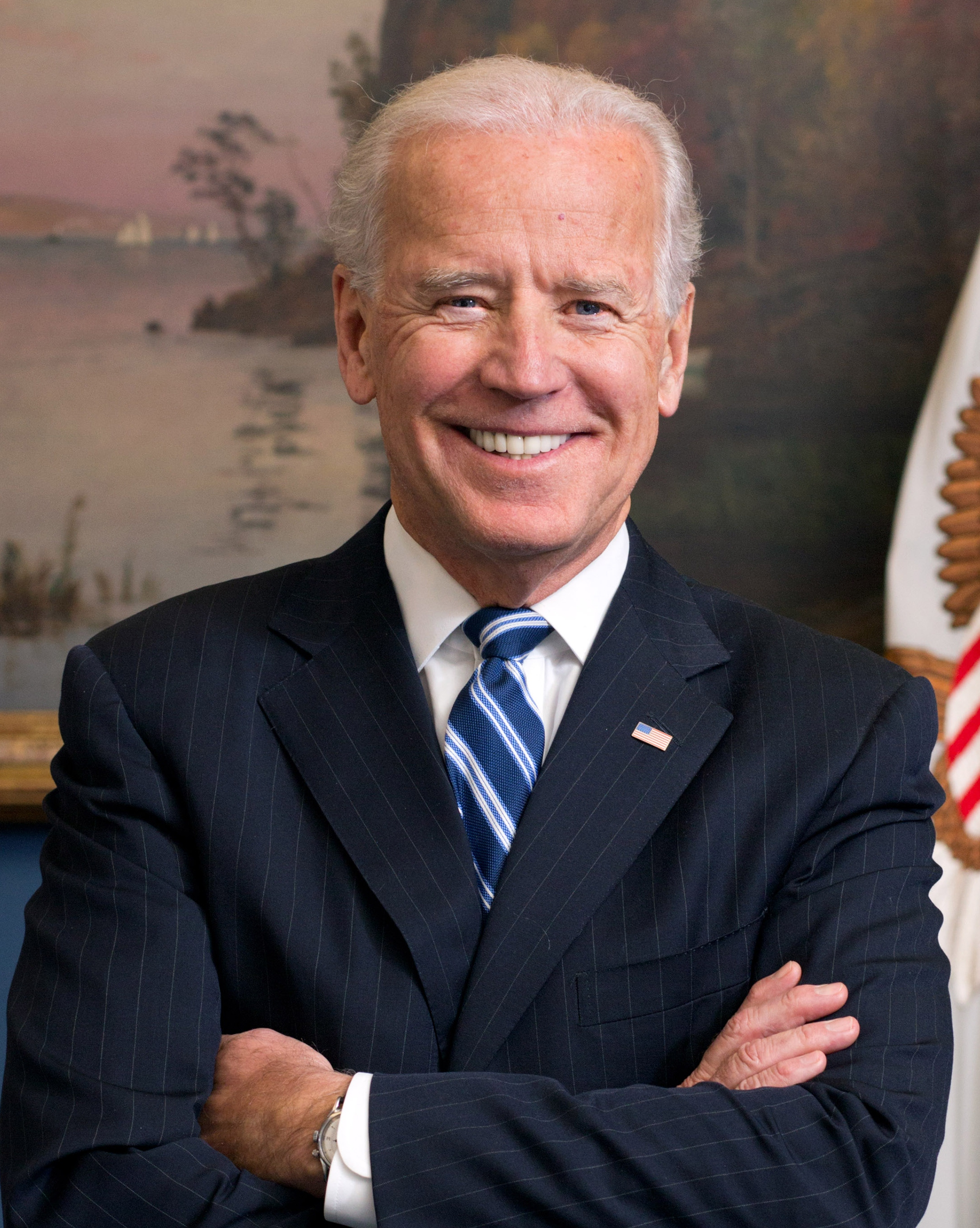
Joe Biden

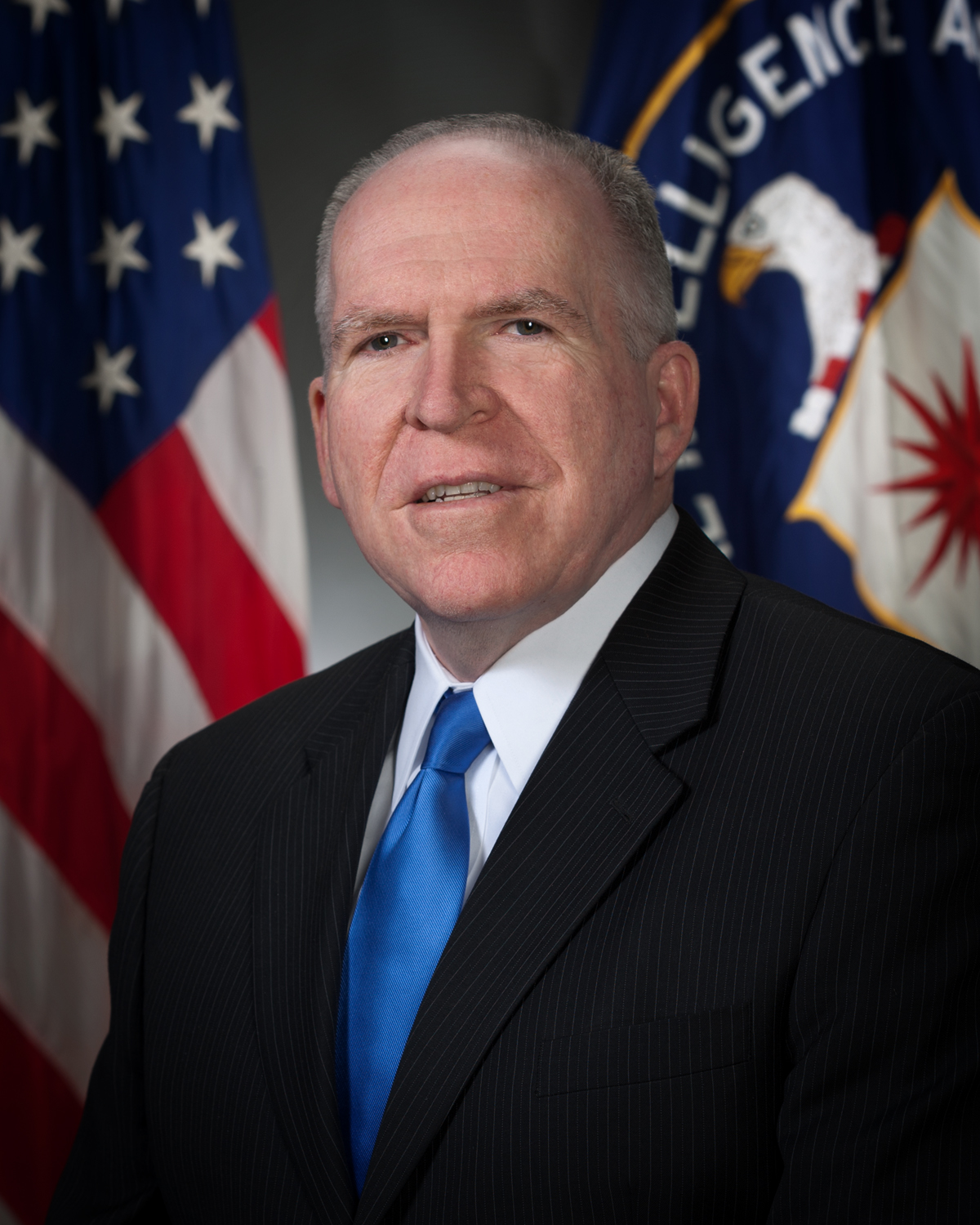
John Brennan

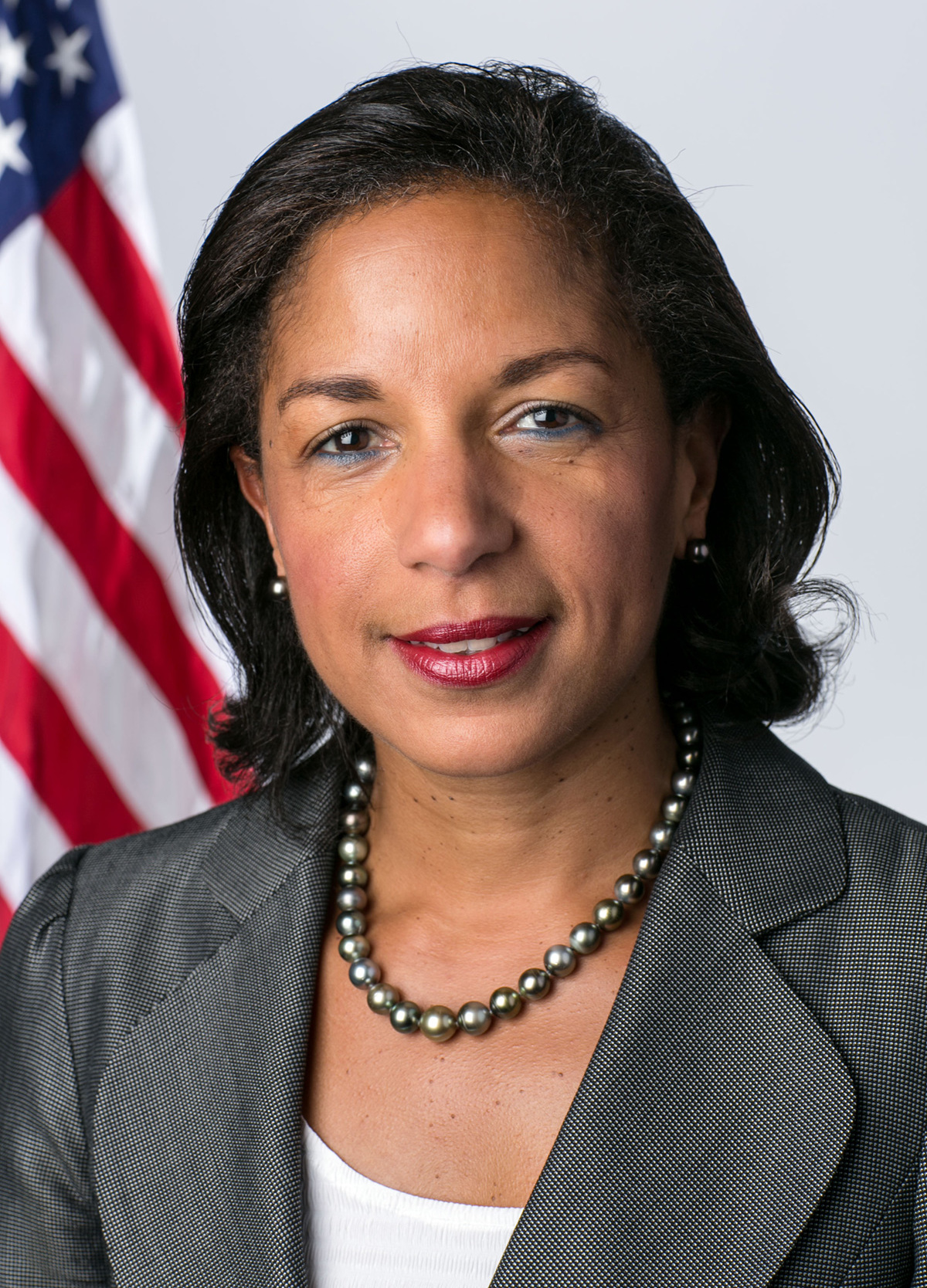
Susan Rice

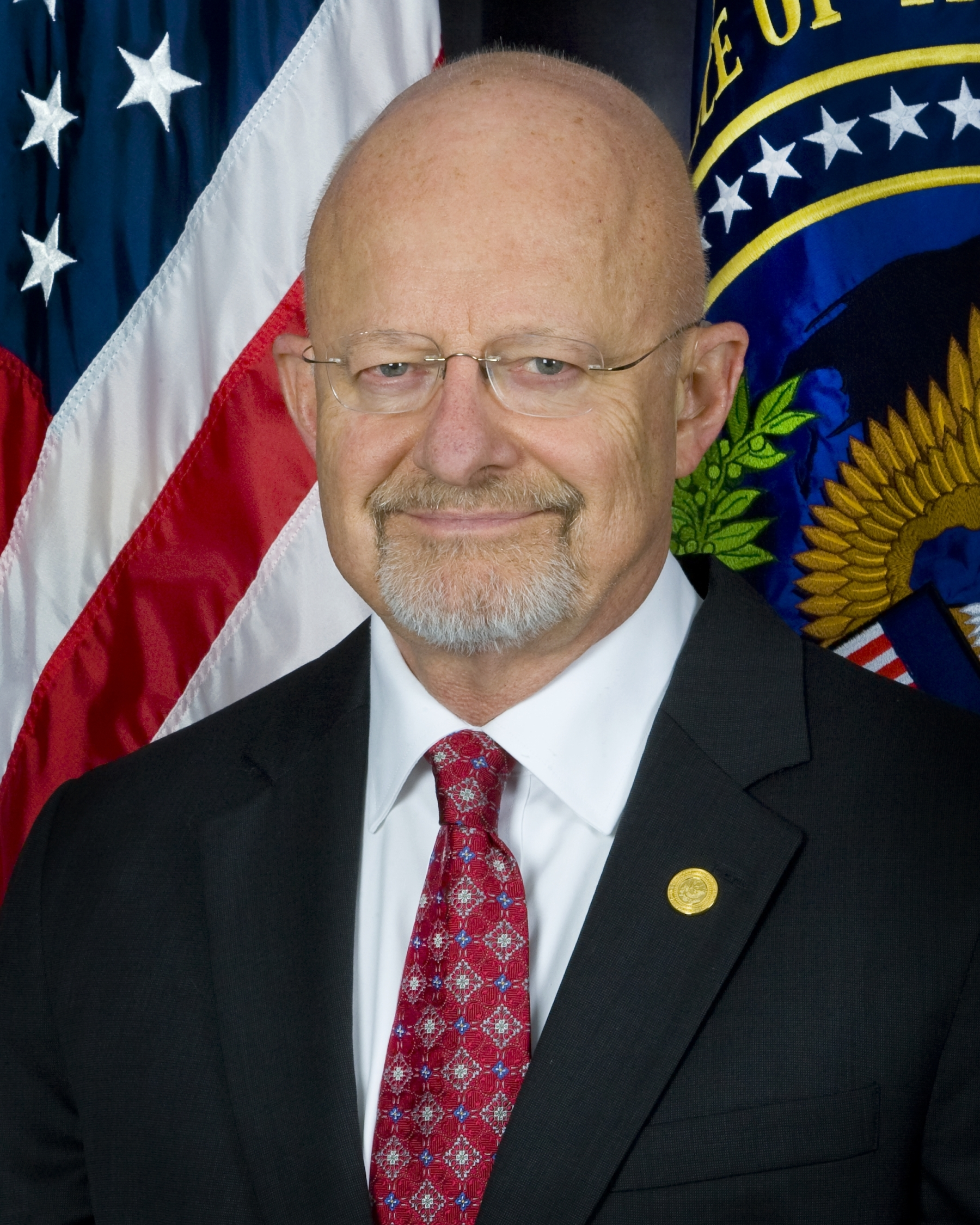
James Clapper

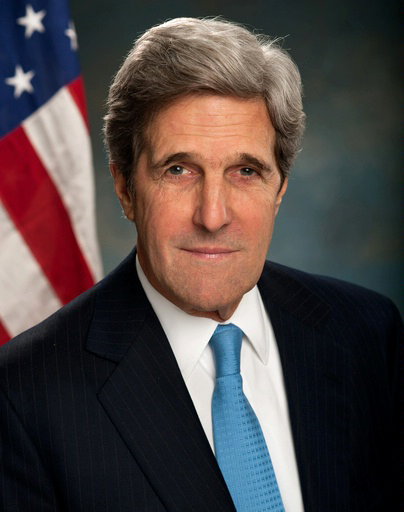
John Kerry

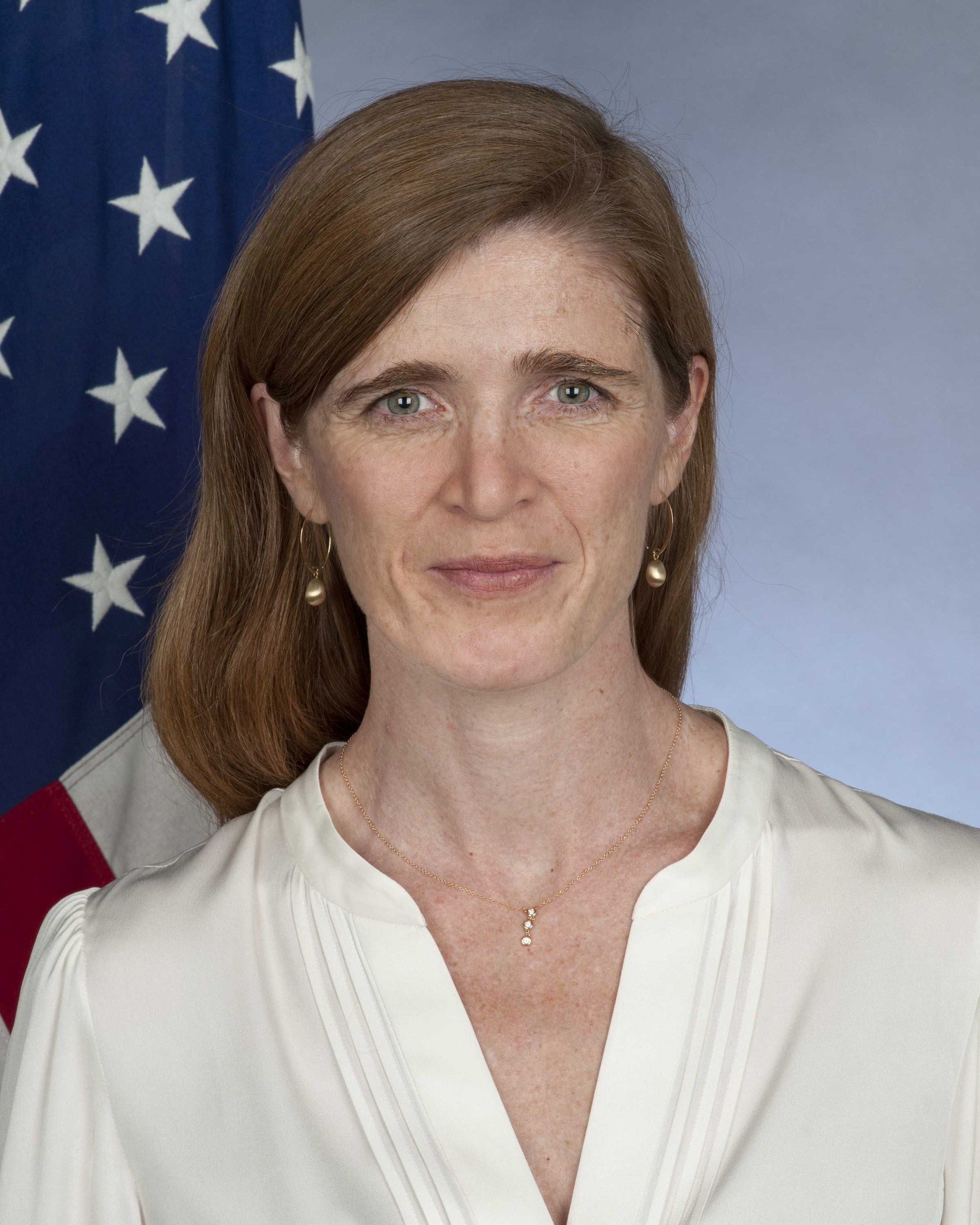
Samantha Power

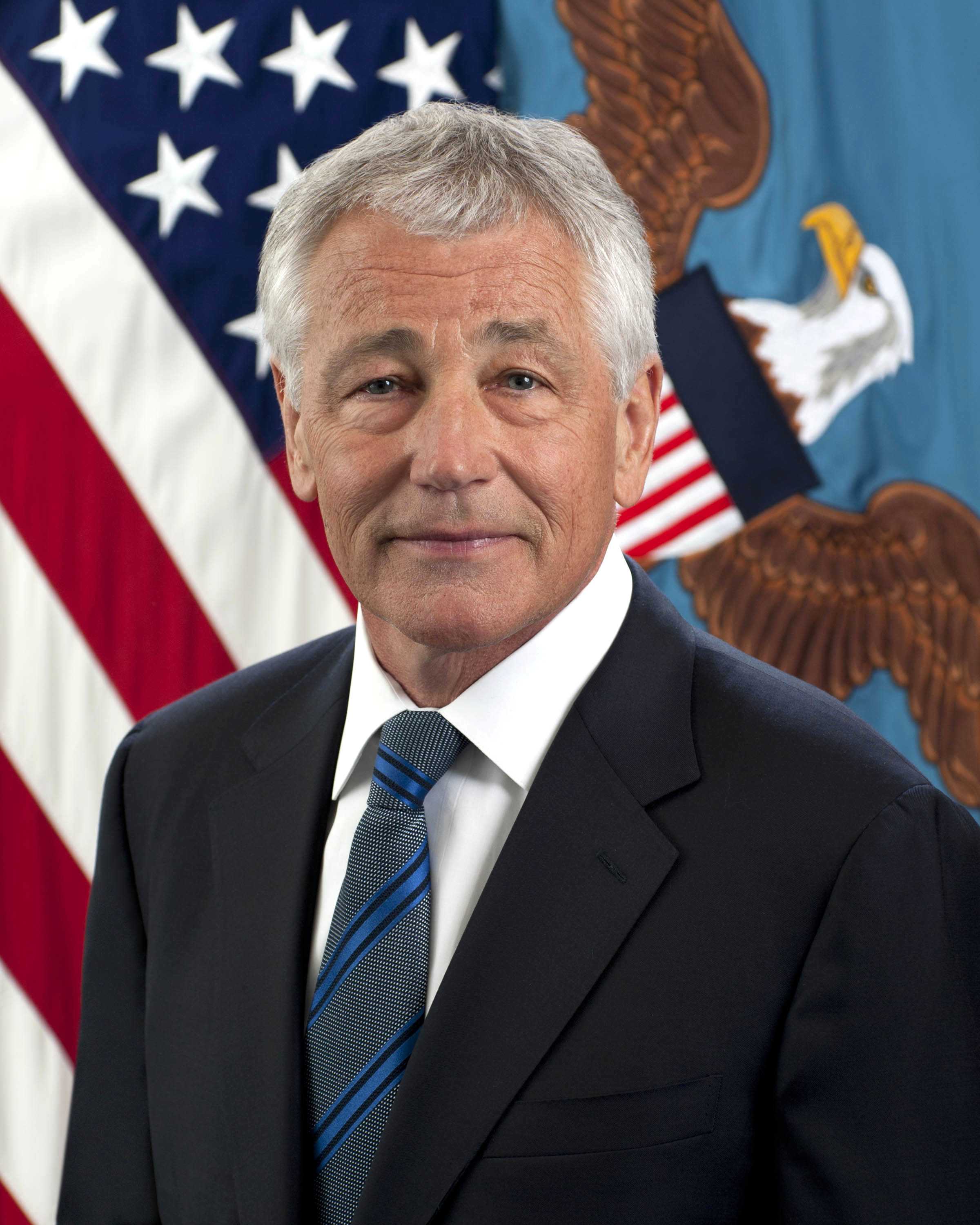
Chuck Hagel

Obama administration Foreign Policy Personnel
Vice President	Biden (2009–2017)					
White House Chief of Staff	Emanuel (2009–2010)	Rouse (2010–2011)	Daley (2011–2012)	Lew (2012–2013)		McDonough (2013–2017)
Secretary of State	Clinton (2009–2013)				Kerry (2013–2017)	
Secretary of Defense	Gates (2009–2011)		Panetta (2011–2013)		Hagel (2013–2015)	Carter (2015–2017)
Ambassador to the United Nations	Rice (2009–2013)				Power (2013–2017)	
Director of National Intelligence	Blair (2009–2010)	Gompert (2010)	Clapper (2010–2017)			
Director of the Central Intelligence Agency	Panetta (2009–2011)	Morell (2011)	Petraeus (2011–2012)	Morell (2012–2013)	Brennan (2013–2017)	
Assistant to the President for National Security Affairs	Jones (2009–2010)	Donilon (2010–2013)			Rice (2013–2017)	
Deputy Assistant to the President for National Security Affairs	Donilon (2009–2010)	McDonough (2010–2013)			Blinken (2013–2015)	Haines (2015–2017)
Deputy National Security Advisor for Strategic Communications and Speechwriting	Rhodes (2009–2017)					
Trade Representative	Kirk (2009–2013)		Marantis (2013)	Sapiro (2013)	Froman (2013–2017)	

== International trips ==
Countries visited by President Obama during his time in office

The number of visits per country where he travelled are:

- One visit to Argentina, Brazil, Cambodia, Chile, Colombia, Costa Rica, Cuba, Egypt, El Salvador, Estonia, Ethiopia, Ghana, Greece, Iraq, Ireland, Jamaica, Jordan, Kenya, Laos, the Netherlands, Norway, Panama, Peru, Senegal, Singapore, Spain, Sweden, Tanzania, Thailand, Trinidad and Tobago, Vietnam, and the West Bank
- Two visits to Australia, Belgium, the Czech Republic, Denmark, India, Indonesia, Israel, Italy, Malaysia, Myanmar, the Philippines, Portugal, Russia, South Africa, Turkey, and Vatican City
- Three visits to Canada, China, and Poland
- Four visits to Afghanistan, Japan, and South Korea
- Five visits to Mexico, Saudi Arabia, and the United Kingdom
- Six visits to France and Germany

== Americas ==
=== North America ===
==== Canada ====
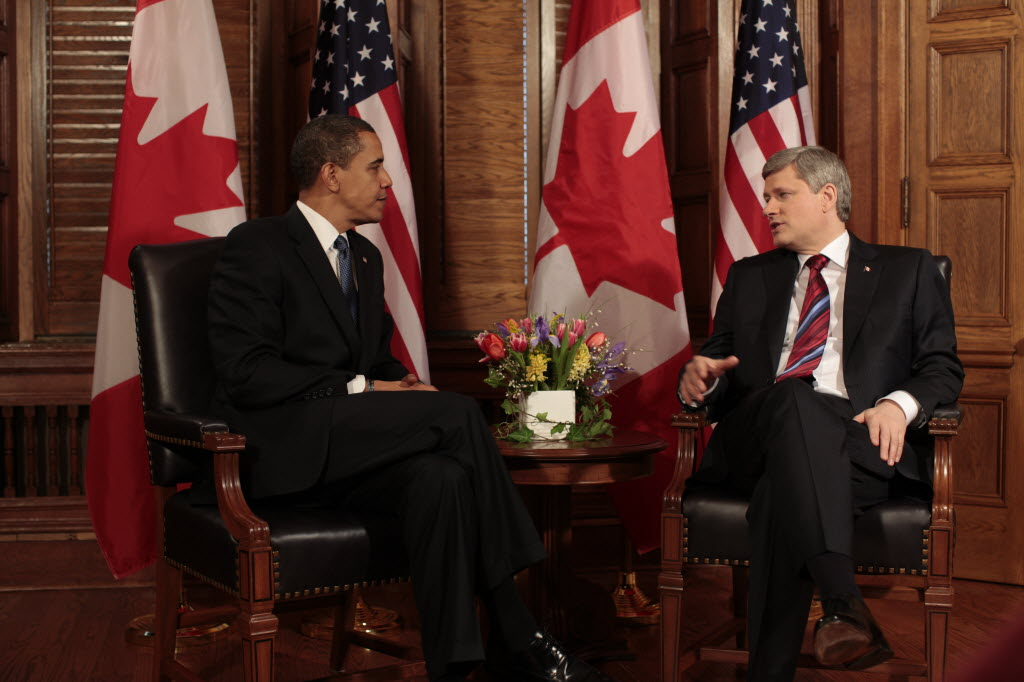
Obama and Canadian Prime Minister Stephen Harper, February 2009

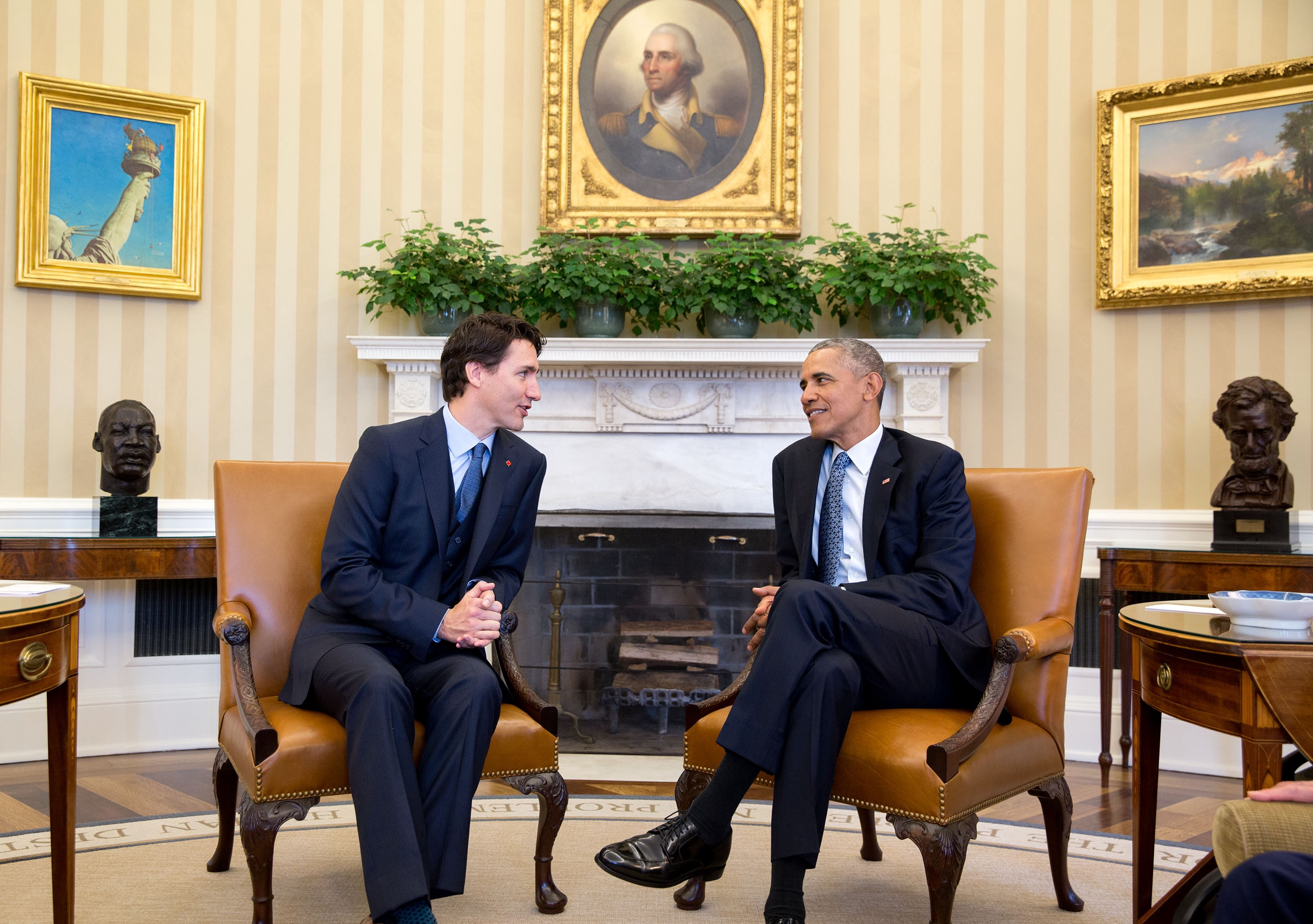
Obama and Canadian Prime Minister Justin Trudeau, March 2016

Following the victory of Obama in the 2008 U.S. presidential election, it was announced that Canada would be Obama's first international trip as president, which took place on February 19, 2009.

Aside from Canadian lobbying against "Buy American" provisions in the US stimulus package, relations between the two administrations had been smooth up to 2011. On February 4, 2011, President Obama and Prime Minister Stephen Harper issued a "Declaration on a Shared Vision for Perimeter Security and Economic Competitiveness".

Prime Minister Justin Trudeau, who was elected in October 2015, visited the White House for an official visit and state dinner on March 10, 2016. Trudeau and Obama were reported to have shared warm personal relations during the visit, making humorous remarks about which country was better at hockey and which country had better beer. Obama complimented Trudeau's 2015 election campaign for its "message of hope and change" and "positive and optimistic vision". Obama and Trudeau also held "productive" discussions on climate change and relations between the two countries, and Trudeau invited Obama to speak in the Canadian parliament in Ottawa later in the year.

==== Cuba ====
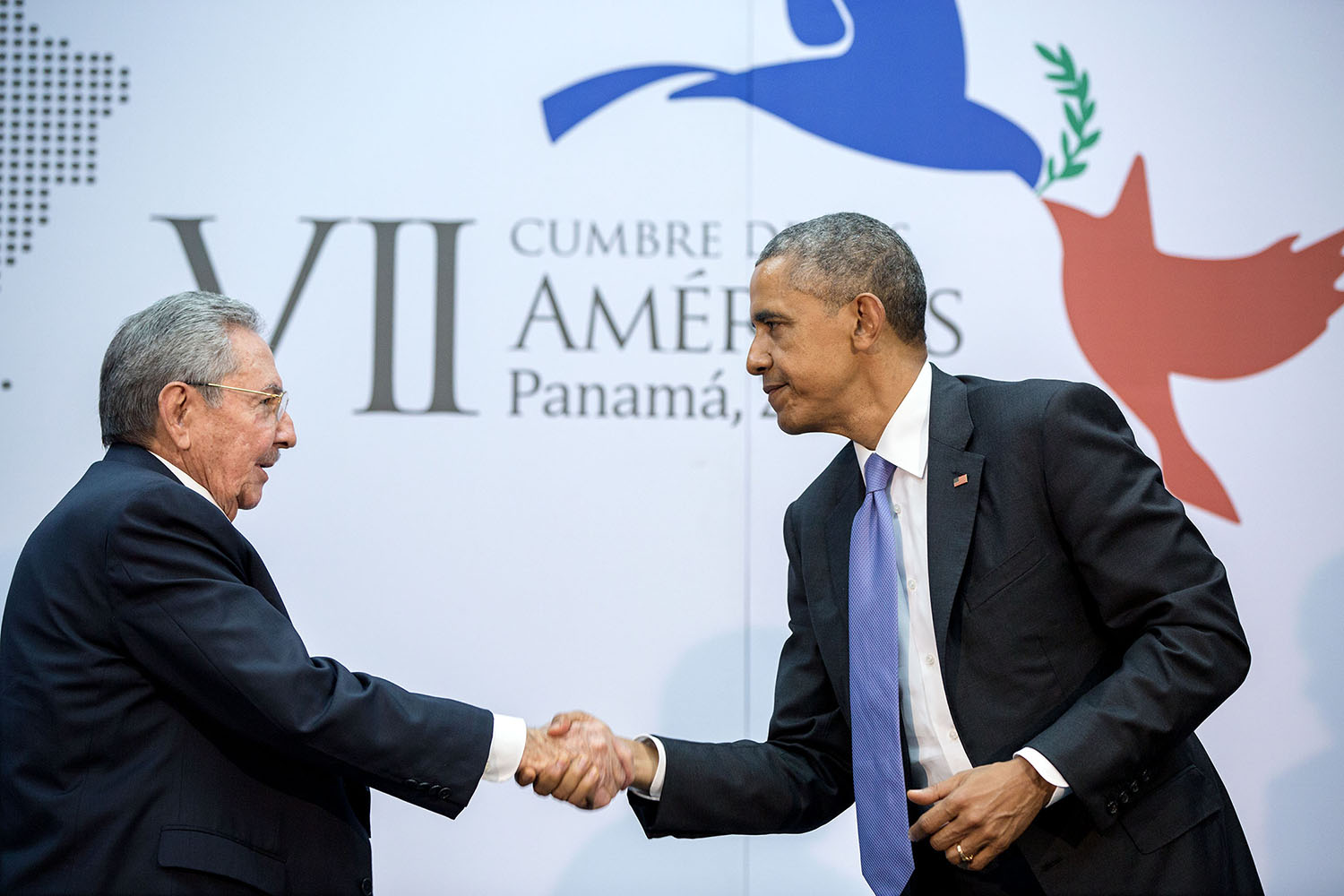
Obama and Cuban President Raúl Castro, April 2015

During his presidential campaign in 2008, Obama asserted that his policy toward Cuba would be based on "libertad", promising that as President of the United States, he would push the Cuban government to embrace democratic reforms and free political prisoners. After his election, former Cuban President Fidel Castro said he was "open" to the idea of meeting with the president-elect. However most of his policies towards Cuba before 2014 were little changed from the Bush policies.

After Obama announced the intended closure of the Guantánamo Bay detention camp shortly after his inauguration, Cuban President Raúl Castro said Havana would continue to push for the U.S. to "liquidate" the entire Guantanamo Bay Naval Base and return the land to Cuba. He was joined by his brother Fidel, who abandoned his magnanimity toward the new U.S. president and demanded that the base be retroceded to Cuba.

While the United States House of Representatives passed legislation, backed by Obama, to ease certain travel and cash transactions imposed against Cuba by the U.S., on February 25, 2009, sanctions which were further eased by Obama unilaterally in April 2009, the president was initially coy about lifting the embargo against Cuba. Obama professed to view the embargo as a useful tool for leverage on pushing for reform in Cuba. This is in contrast to what Obama stated in 2004 when he said that it was time "to end the embargo with Cuba" because it had "utterly failed in the effort to overthrow Castro." Obama's stance had met criticism from both Fidel Castro and members of the U.S. government, including ranking member of the Senate Foreign Relations Committee Richard Lugar. A panel with the Washington-based Brookings Institution released a report in late February 2009 urging Obama to normalize relations with Cuba.

On June 2, leading a delegation to Honduras for the Organization of American States General Assembly, Clinton affirmed that Cuba needed to reach a certain political and democratic standard to rejoin the organization. On 10 December 2013, Obama shook hands with Raul Castro at the state funeral of Nelson Mandela.

In December 2014, after the secret meetings, it was announced that Obama, with Pope Francis as an intermediary, had negotiated a restoration of relations with Cuba, more than a half-century after diplomatic ties were broken in 1961. Popularly dubbed the Cuban Thaw, The New Republic deemed the Cuban Thaw to be "Obama's finest foreign policy achievement." On July 1, 2015, Obama announced that formal diplomatic relations between Cuba and the United States would resume, and embassies would be opened in Washington and Havana. The countries' respective "interests sections" in one another's capitals were upgraded to embassies on July 20 and August 13, 2015, respectively.

Obama visited Havana, Cuba for two days in March 2016, becoming the first sitting U.S. president to arrive since Calvin Coolidge in 1928.

==== Haiti ====
President Obama announced that former presidents Bill Clinton and George W. Bush would coordinate efforts to raise funds for the country's recovery after the 2010 earthquake. Secretary of State Hillary Clinton visited Haiti in January to survey the damage and stated that US$48 million had been raised already in the US to help Haiti recover. Following the meeting with Secretary Clinton, President Préval stated that the highest priorities in Haiti's recovery were establishing a working government, clearing roads, and ensuring the streets were cleared of bodies to improve sanitary conditions.

==== Honduras ====
On June 28, 2009, President Manuel Zelaya was arrested and exiled from the country. Obama condemned the action and described the event as a coup. On July 7, Secretary of State Hillary Clinton met with Zelaya and agreed upon a U.S.-backed proposal for negotiations with the Micheletti government, mediated by President Óscar Arias of Costa Rica. At the conclusion of the meeting, Clinton announced the suspension of economic and military aid to the Honduran government. However, the U.S. led a group of Western Hempishere countries supporting the outcome of November 2009 presidential election of Porfirio Lobo as a way forward to resolve the situation.

=== South America ===
==== Argentina ====
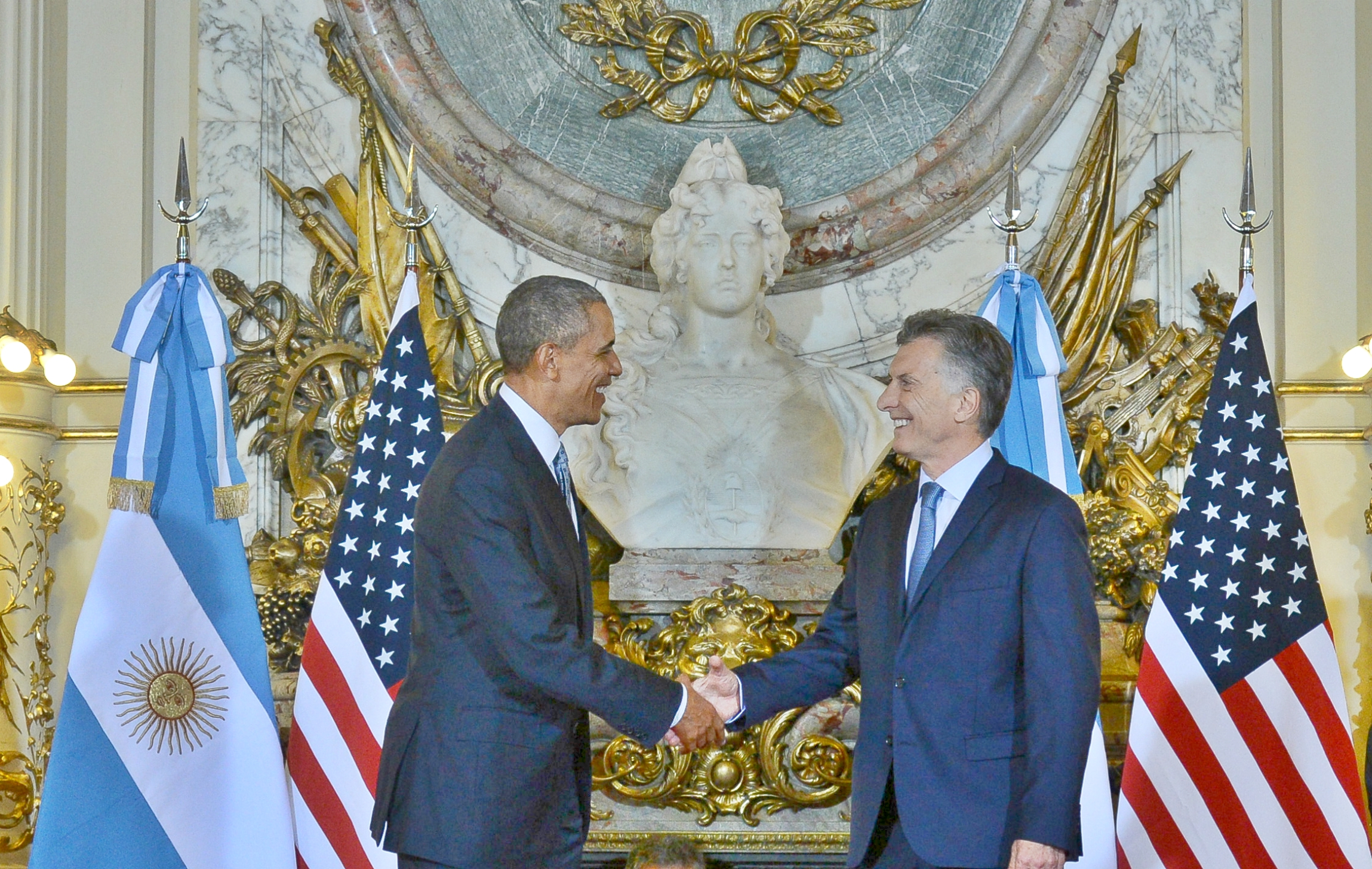
Obama and Argentine President Mauricio Macri, March 2016

President Obama made a state visit to Argentina on March 23–24, 2016 to improve the Argentina–United States relations under the administration of newly elected Argentine president, Mauricio Macri. This followed strained relations under predecessors Cristina Fernández de Kirchner and Néstor Kirchner regarding investments. Obama and Macri discussed ways to strengthen cooperation in promoting "universal values and interests," such as in the areas of security, energy, health and human rights, where the two presidents have agreed for American help to assist Argentina's counter-terrorism efforts, to contribute to peacekeeping missions, combat illegal drug trade and organized crime, respond to diseases and outbreaks like the Zika virus, and develop resources and renewable energy strategies.

Obama declared a "fresh era" of relations to help Argentina's credibility in the Latin American region and the world, and announced trade and economic initiatives to reset the countries' relations after years of tension.

==== Colombia ====
Obama continued Plan Colombia, a diplomatic aid initiative launched by President Bill Clinton to aid Colombia's economy. Partially as a result of Plan Colombia, Colombian President Juan Manuel Santos negotiated an agreement with the guerrilla organization FARC. Though Colombia remained a major producer of drugs, it saw remarkable progress in the reduction of kidnappings, homicides, and unemployment. In addition to continuing Plan Colombia, Obama appointed Bernard Aronson as a special envoy to the peace process between the Colombian government and FARC in order to facilitate negotiations. However, Congresswoman Ileana Ros-Lehtinen and others criticized Obama for engaging with FARC, an organization that appears on the State Department's list of terrorist organizations. Obama promised a continuation of its policy of financial aid to Colombia in the aftermath of the proposed peace deal.

==== Venezuela ====
While Obama set a conciliatory tone for his relations with Venezuela during his candidacy, saying he would be willing to meet with Venezuelan President Hugo Chávez without preconditions at a July 23, 2007, presidential debate.

In January 2009 Chávez derided Obama as taking the same stance toward Venezuela as Bush, but the next month, as the price of oil fell, Chavez communicated openness to discussions with the Obama administration. On February 15, 2009, Chávez said, "Any day is propitious for talking with President Barack Obama," but said later that month that he "couldn't care less" about meeting the new U.S. president ahead of an impending confrontation between the two leaders at the Summit of the Americas in Port-of-Spain, Trinidad, in mid-April.

However, as recently as the first week of March the same year, Chávez called upon Obama to follow the path to socialism, which he termed as the "only" way out of the global recession. "Come with us, align yourself, come with us on the road to socialism. This is the only path. Imagine a socialist revolution in the United States", Chávez told a group of workers in the southern Venezuelan state of Bolívar. He said that people were calling Obama a "socialist" for the measures of state intervention he is taking to counter the crisis, so it would not be too far-fetched to suggest that he might join the project of "21st century socialism" that the Venezuelan leader is heading. Later in March, he referred to Obama as a "poor ignoramus" for not knowing the situation in Latin America and even implied that Brazil's President Lula was not completely happy with his meeting with Obama. However the Brazilian Foreign Ministry denied that this was the case.

In Trinidad on April 17, 2009, Obama and Chávez met for the first time. Later, Chávez walked over to Obama during the summit, and handed him a copy of Open Veins of Latin America by Uruguayan author Eduardo Galeano, an essay about U.S. and European economic and political interference in the region. During the summit, Obama is reported to have said, to much applause, "We have at times been disengaged, and at times we sought to dictate our terms, but I pledge to you that we seek an equal partnership. There is no senior partner and junior partner in our relations".

In December 2014, during the presidency of Chávez's successor, Nicolás Maduro, Obama signed a sanctions law on Venezuelan government officials.

===== Operation Money Badger =====
Operation Money Badger was a secret espionage operation carried out in Venezuela by the Drug Enforcement Administration (DEA) and United States prosecutors since 2013.

After the Federal Prosecutor's Office in Manhattan released a series of classified documents in an apparent accident, Associated Press (AP) published an investigative report with the news on February 1, 2024.

== Arctic ==
During Obama's presidency, there was increased global attention paid to the Arctic, and the challenges and opportunities present in the region. The Obama administration responded accordingly by placing significantly greater focus on the Arctic and Arctic issues than the Bush administration, achieving a notable first in September 2015 by becoming the first sitting president ever to visit the Arctic Circle.

The Arctic is divided between 8 Arctic states that serve as permanent members of the Arctic Council. The primary policy of the Obama administration within the region had been to facilitate cooperation among these states on regional issues. Upon assuming office, Obama looked to reset relations with Russia across the board; however, as US–Russian relations deteriorated in other matters of mutual interest, the Arctic remained a site of cooperation between the two states.

In 2011, the Arctic states created the Arctic Search and Rescue Agreement, which established the search parameters for Arctic states. Search and Rescue collaboration between states has since strengthened further with the creation of the Coast Guard Forum in 2015.

During Obama's presidency, the United States assumed chairmanship of the Arctic Council 2015-2017 and looked to launch major collaborative projects while in that office. During the United States chairmanship, the Arctic Council focused on improving economic and living conditions for Arctic communities; improving Arctic Ocean safety, security and stewardship; and addressing the impacts of climate change. The last Arctic Council meeting of Obama's presidency was in Maine in 4–6 October 2016 where the agenda focused on Arctic sustainable development and the climate.

Countering the regional effects of climate change was a major focus of the Obama presidency's Arctic policy, particularly during his final two years in office. Obama agreed in March 2016 to protect at least 17% of its Arctic territory from development during a joint event with Prime Minister Trudeau of Canada.

Within the Arctic Council, an expert group was created in 2015 investigating the threat posed by black carbon to the region which concluded its findings and recommendations in 2016. The administration had also looked to increase data sharing—a major agenda item at the inaugural White House Arctic Science Ministerial in September 2016.

While regional co-operation to counter joint challenges was the primary commitment of the Obama administration, US Arctic military capabilities also increased under Obama. In 2016, the ICEX exercise was carried out and was widely regarded to be a major success. President Obama had also commissioned two new US icebreakers in 2015.

== Asia ==
Secretary of State Hillary Clinton announced in 2011 a rebalancing of foreign policy to give more emphasis to Asia, especially in response to the rapidly growing Chinese role in the region. She called for "a substantially increased investment – diplomatic, economic, strategic, and otherwise – in the Asia-Pacific region." As of 2014, many analysts did not find significant changes and some argued that the U.S. is again neglecting the region. Obama's support of the Trans-Pacific Partnership was motivated in large part by his goal to "pivot" the US to East Asia.

=== East Asia ===
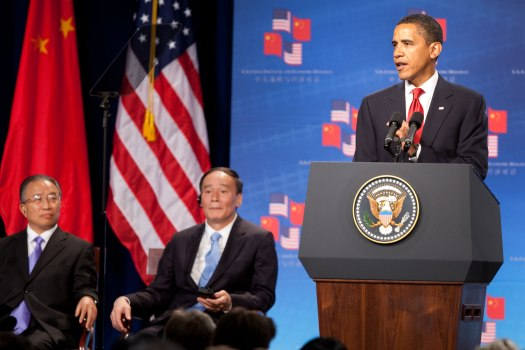
President Barack Obama addresses the opening session of the first U.S.–China Strategic and Economic Dialogue.

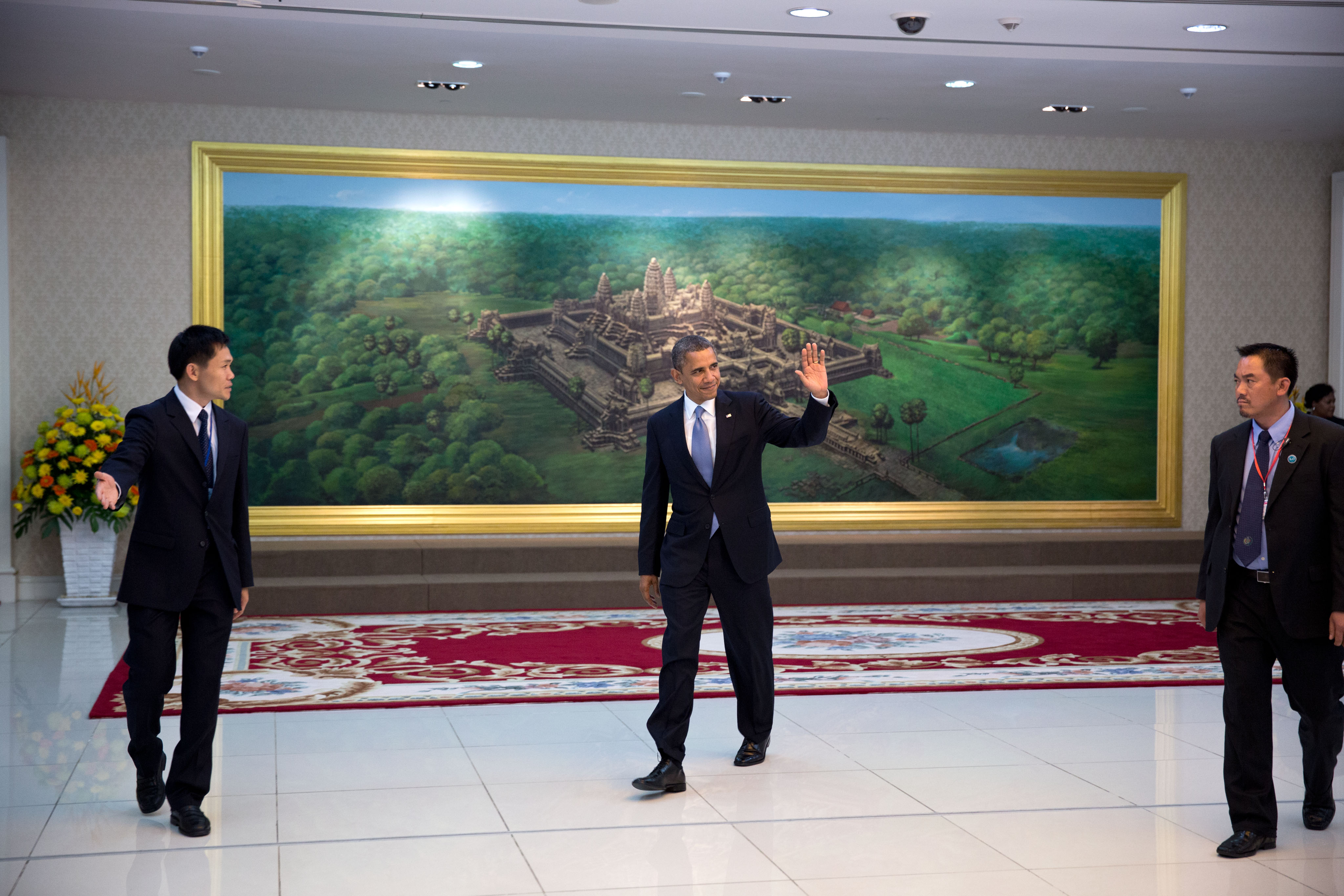
President Obama at the Vimean Santepheap (Peace Palace) in Phnom Penh, Cambodia

Secretary of State Clinton left on her first foreign policy tour (to Asia) on February 15, 2009, with stops in Japan, China, South Korea, Philippines, and Indonesia. The Secretary had travelled to the region extensively, including at least three trips to various countries in the region in 2009, 2010 and 2011. In July 2012, Secretary Clinton traveled Mongolia, Vietnam, Laos and Cambodia. The visit to Laos was the first by a Secretary of State in 57 years.

On April 1, 2009, Obama and Hu Jintao announced the establishment of the high-level U.S.-China Strategic and Economic Dialogue, which superseded the Strategic Economic Dialogue. It was co-chaired by Hillary Clinton and Timothy Geithner on the U.S. side and Dai Bingguo and Wang Qishan on the Chinese side and on May 16, 2009, Obama personally announced the nomination of Jon Huntsman Jr., the Republican Governor of Utah to fill the position of Ambassador to China. Huntsman was the only ambassador in the Administration to be personally announced by the President. Later that year, President Obama and Secretary Clinton made a high-profile trip to China on November 15–18, 2009 marking Obama's first visit to China. It was Obama's first presidential Asia trip since he was inducted. He also went to Japan, Singapore for the APEC summit and South Korea for the first U.S.-ASEAN summit. The United States Pacific Command had also been at the forefront of efforts to strengthen military relationships in the region. The United States and China often clashed over China's claims in the South China Sea, parts of which are also claimed by Vietnam, the Philippines and Malaysia.

In 2012, Obama became the first sitting American president to visit Cambodia and Myanmar.

In 2014, President Obama stated that the United States recognized Tibet as part of China but also encouraged the Chinese authorities to take steps to preserve the unique cultural, religious and linguistic identity of the Tibetan people.

In 2016, Obama became the first sitting American president to visit Laos, which the United States had bombed during the Vietnam War. Obama also increased funding to clean up unexploded ordnance in Laos.

During the Obama administration, the US signed more bilateral agreements with China than it had during any other US administration, with a focus on bilateral efforts to address climate change.

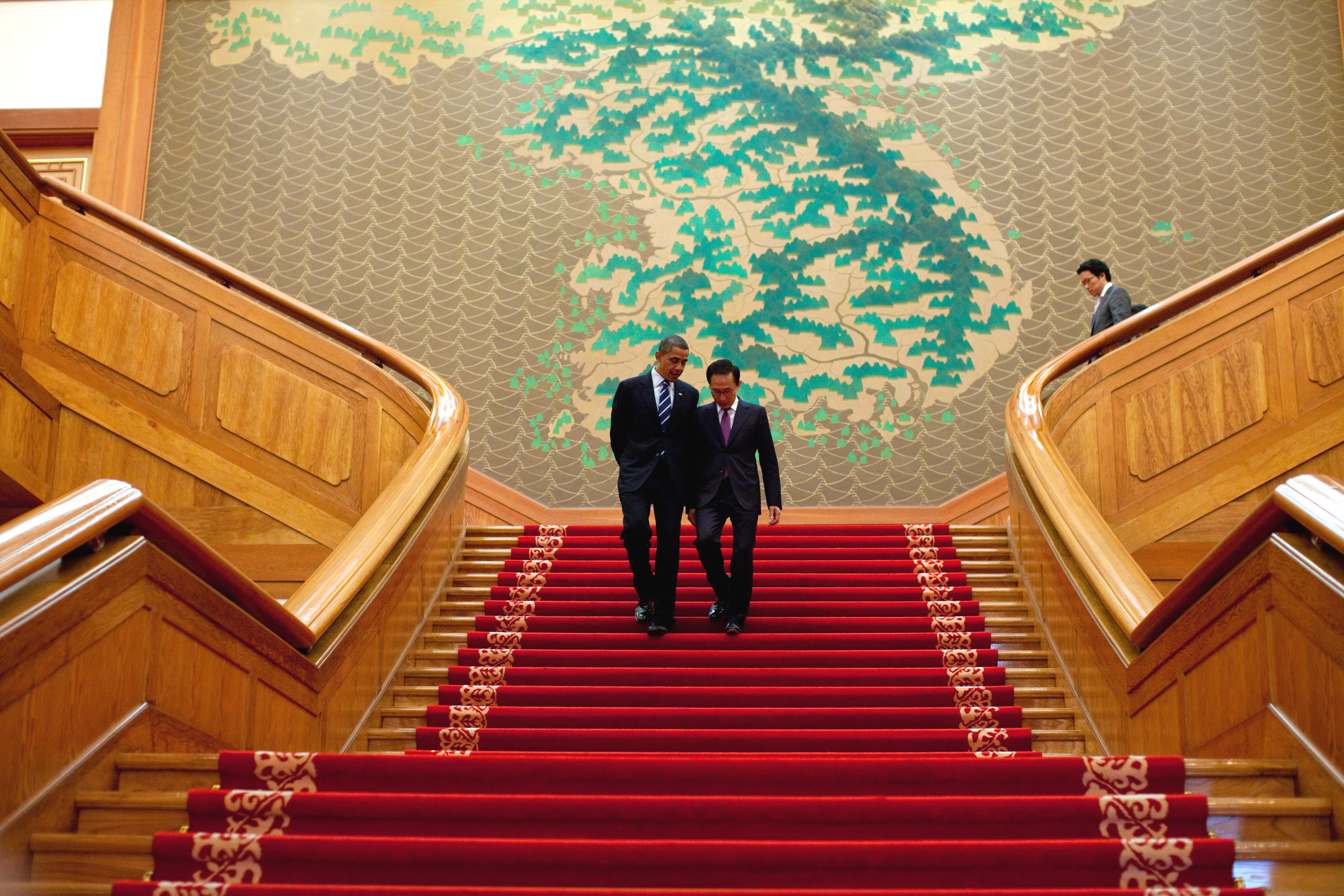
United States President Barack Obama and Lee walking after a meeting at the Blue House in Seoul in November 2010

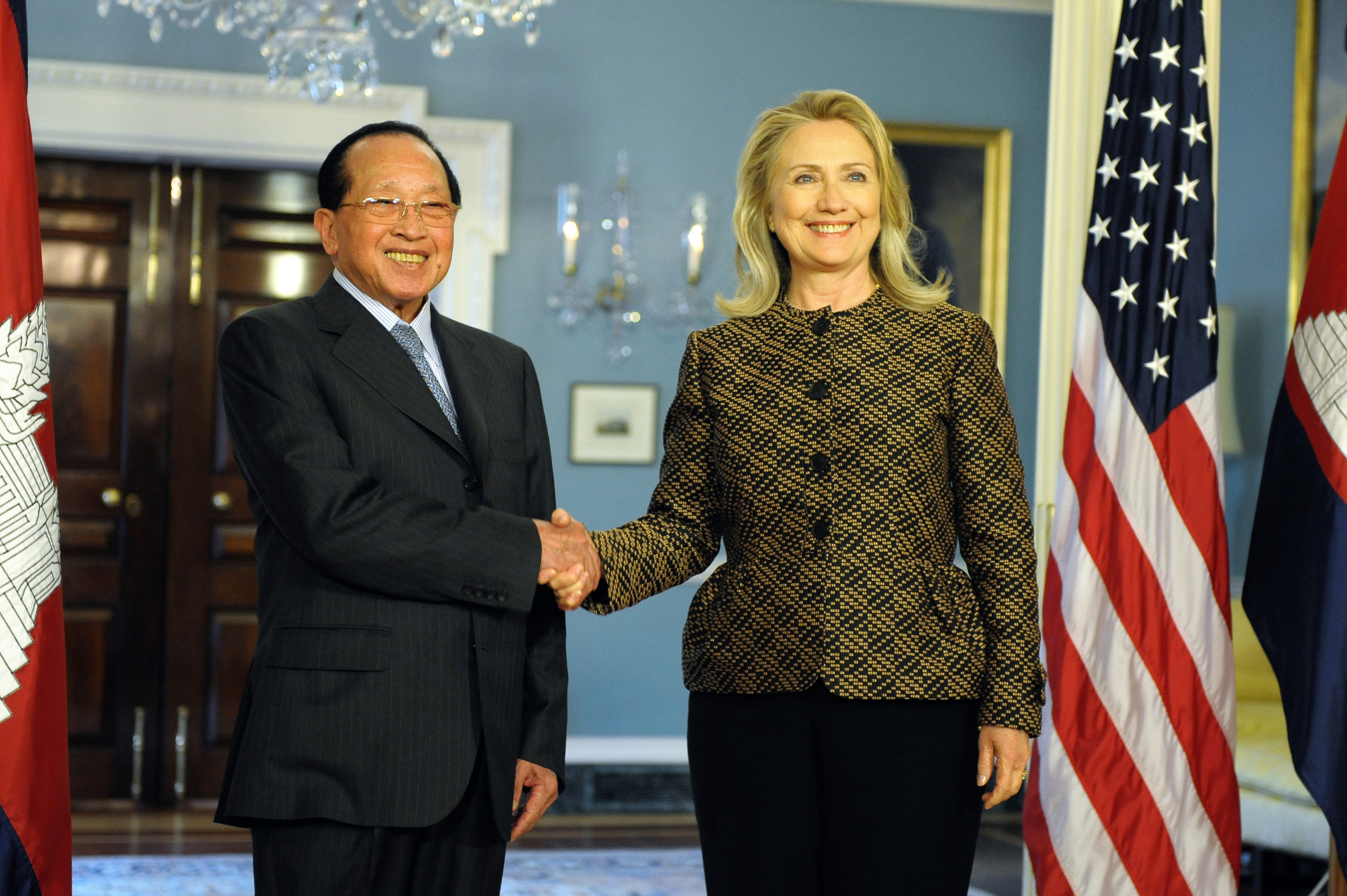
Clinton with Cambodian Foreign Minister Hor Namhong

==== North Korea ====
Relations between the U.S. and North Korea were contentious during the Obama administration, largely due to conflict over the North Korean nuclear weapons program and threats of military action. Not long after Obama took office, North Korea elbowed its way back onto the international stage after a period of relative quiet, drawing accusations of planning a new long-range intercontinental ballistic missile test weeks after Obama was sworn in and performing an unannounced nuclear warhead and missile testing in late May 2009 to the disapproval of the State Department. Relations were further strained with the imprisonment of American journalists Euna Lee and Laura Ling for their alleged illegal entry into North Korean territory on assignment for a media organization. although both women were later released on August 5, 2009. Later that year, Pyongyang announced its intention to terminate the 1953 armistice ending hostilities in the Korean War on May 28, 2009, effectively restarting the nearly 60-year-old conflict, and prompting the South Korea-United States Combined Forces Command to Watchcon II, the second-highest alert level possible. In 2010, two more major incidents with North Korea occurred: the sinking of a South Korean Navy Ship that actuated new rounds of military exercises with South Korea as a direct military response to sinking and the Bombardment of Yeonpyeong prompting the US aircraft carrier USS George Washington to depart for joint exercises in the Yellow Sea with the Republic of Korea Navy, to deter further North Korean military action. In light of the geopolitical developments with North Korea, the Obama administration had called the U.S.–South Korean alliance as a "cornerstone of US security in the Pacific Region." During Obama's presidency, North Korea's nuclear-weapons and missile program became "steadily more alarming" to the United States and Obama was criticized for failing to hinder or eliminate the program.

==== Japan ====
Japan, a major ally of the United States, has been engaged in a diplomatic dispute with China over control of the South China Sea. In Secretary of State Clinton's inaugural tour of East Asia, she reassured Japanese officials of Japan's centrality in the network of American alliances. In response to the 2011 Tōhoku earthquake and tsunami, the United States initiated Operation Tomodachi to support Japan in disaster relief following the 2011 Tōhoku earthquake and tsunami earning gratitude from Japan's minister of defense, Toshimi Kitazawa who, while visiting the Ronald Reagan, thanked its crew for its assistance as part of Operation Tomodachi saying, "I have never been more encouraged by and proud of the fact that the United States is our ally."

On May 27, 2016, Obama became the first sitting American president to visit Hiroshima, Japan, 71 years after the U.S. atomic bombing of Hiroshima towards the end of World War II. Accompanied by Japanese Prime Minister Shinzō Abe, Obama paid tribute to the victims of the bombing at the Hiroshima Peace Memorial Museum. Although he was pressured to by atomic bomb survivor groups, he did not apologize for the decision to drop the bomb.

=== South Asia ===
The Obama administration's South Asian foreign policy was outlined in "The Obama Administration's Policy on South Asia" by Robert O. Blake Jr., Assistant Secretary of State for the Bureau of South and Central Asian Affairs, who wrote "[o]ur goal was and remains to support the development of sovereign, stable, democratic nations, integrated into the world economy and cooperating with one another, the United States, and our partners to advance regional security and stability."

At the start of the Obama administration there were several regional hot spots within South Asia including India and Pakistan.

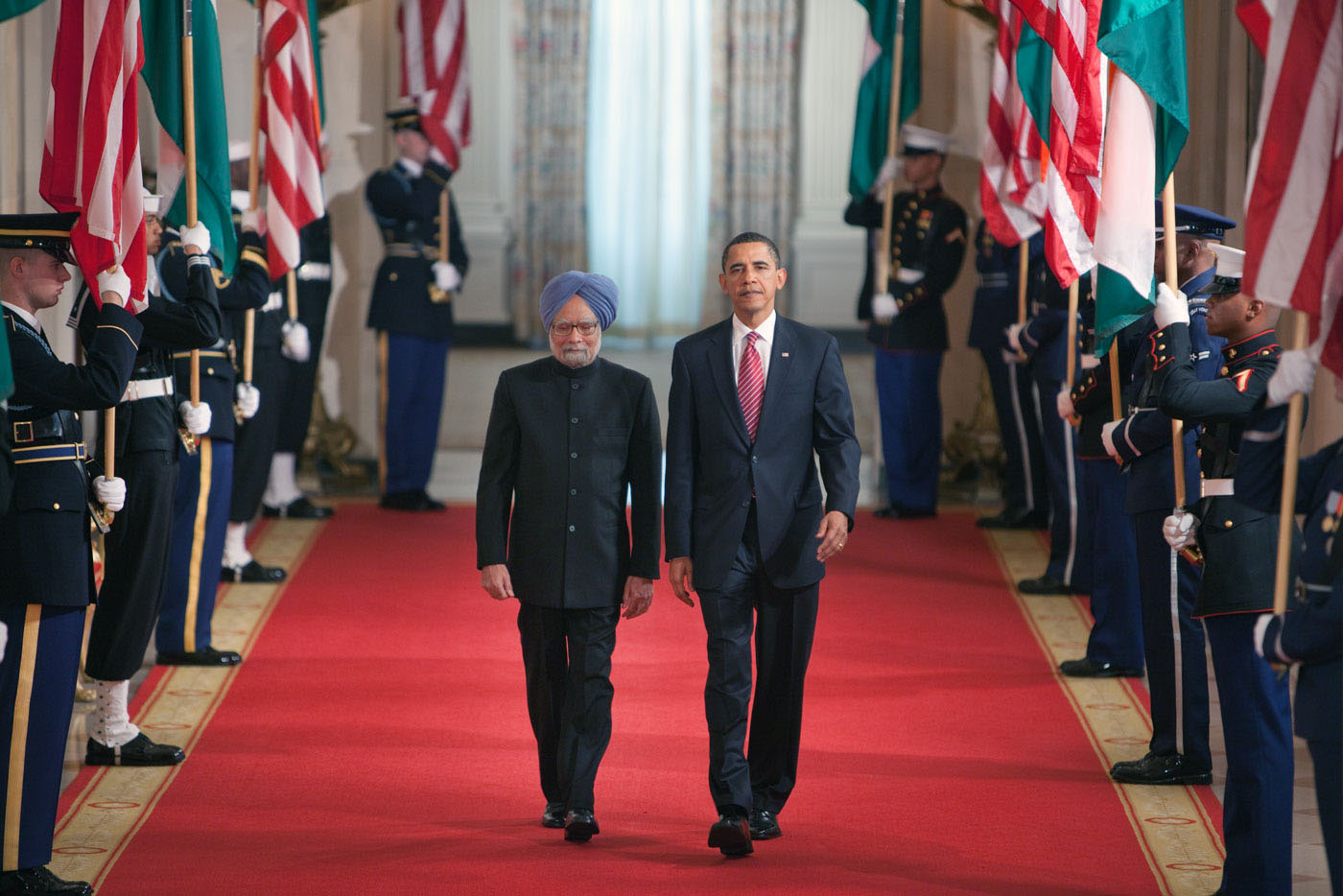
President Obama with the Prime Minister of India Dr Manmohan Singh during the first state dinner hosted by the Obama administration

In August 2009, Obama ordered the expansion of airstrikes to include the organization of Baitullah Mehsud, the militant chief reportedly behind the 2007 assassination of Benazir Bhutto, as priority targets.

There was nuclear tension between India and Pakistan since both had nuclear weapons. This conflict had been ongoing since August 1947 after the Partition of India. Criticism had been leveled at the Obama administration for its apparent lack of an early response to U.S. foreign policy with India. The former director for South Asia in the National Security Council in the Bush administration, Xenia Dormandy claims that India is America's indispensable ally in the region and that the Obama administration should take steps to improve relations with India.

== Europe ==
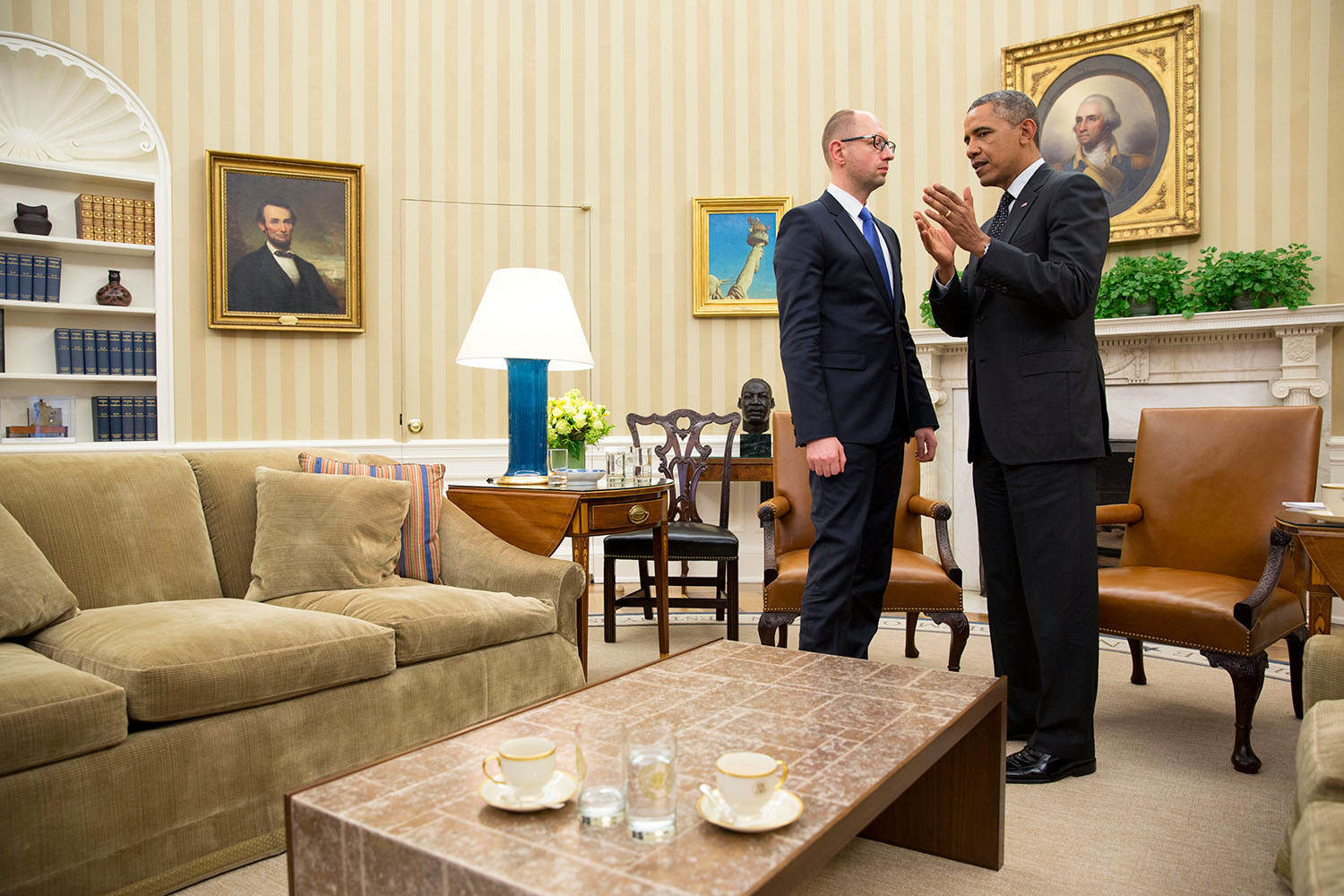
President Barack Obama talks with Prime Minister Arseniy Yatsenyuk of Ukraine at the conclusion of their bilateral meeting in the Oval Office, March 12, 2014.

Fabbrini in 2011 identified a cycle in anti-Americanism in Europe: modest in the 1990s, it grew explosively between 2003 and 2008, then declined after 2008. He sees the current version as related to images of American foreign policy-making as unrestrained by international institutions or world opinion. Thus it is the unilateral policy process and the arrogance of policy makers, not the specific policy decisions, that are decisive.

=== East Europe ===
==== Russia ====
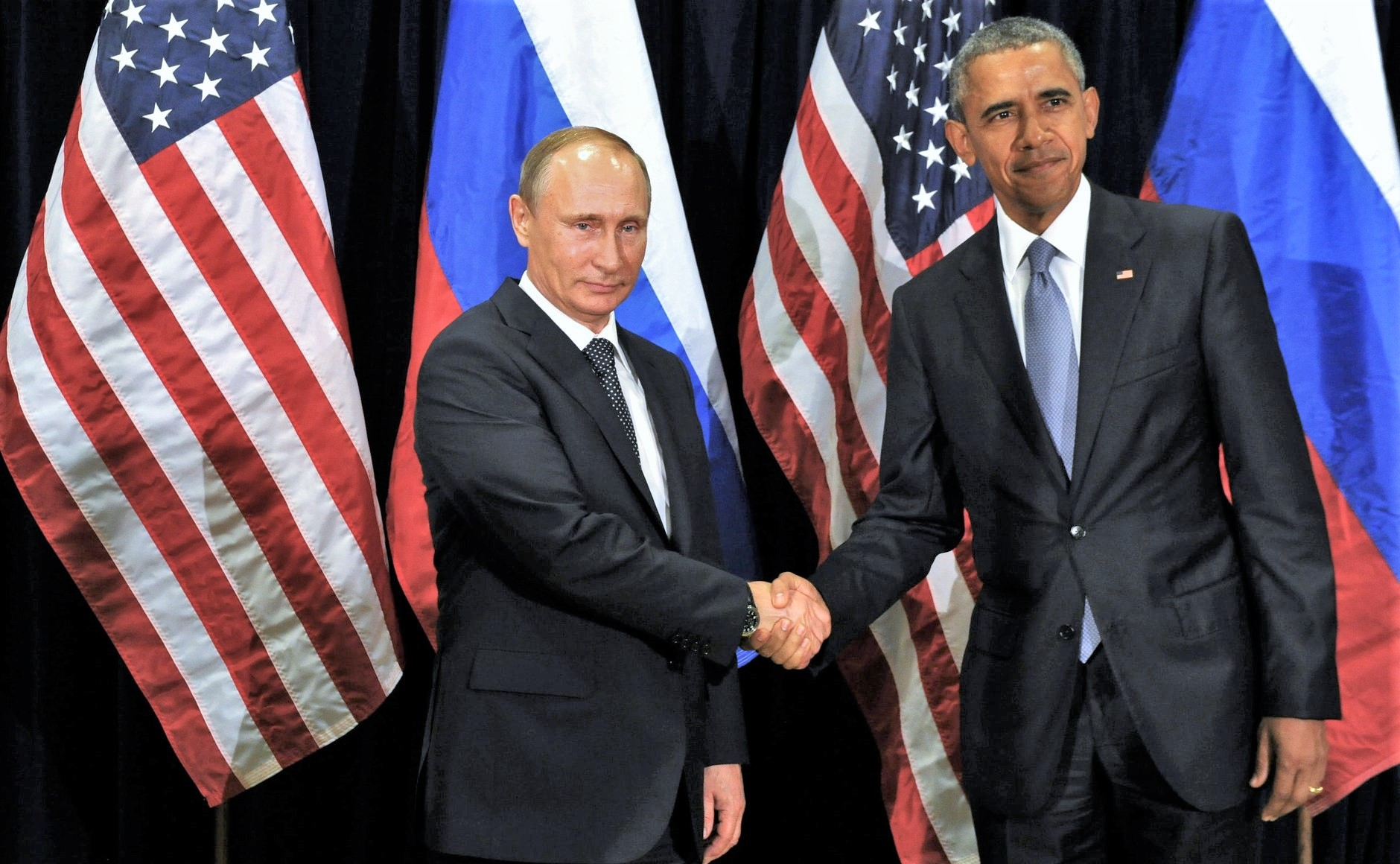
Meeting between President Obama and Russian President Vladimir Putin in New York City, September 2015

Tensions remained as Russia pushed back against attempts at further eastward expansion of NATO and the European Union into areas that had previously been part of the Russian Empire and the USSR. Georgia and Ukraine were the major flash points. Early on, Obama called for a "reset" of relations with Russia, and in 2009 the policy became known as the Russian reset; but critics debated whether or not it could improve bilateral relations or was about to concede too much to Russia.

At the end of March 2014, president Obama dismissed Russia as a "regional power" that did not pose a major security threat to the U.S. The statement was later sharply criticised by Putin as "disrespectful" and an attempt to prove America's exceptionalism as well as by the president of the European Commission Jean-Claude Juncker who in November 2016 said, "We have a lot to learn about the depths of Russia, we are very ignorant about it at the moment. ... Russia is not, as President Obama said, 'a regional power'. This was a big error in assessment."

After Russia's military intervention in Syria in 2015 and the alleged interference in the 2016 election campaign in the U.S., relations between the Russian government and Obama administration became more strained. In September 2016, the U.S. government publicly accused Russia of "flagrant violations of international law" in Syria. Thomas Friedman opined, "Obama believed that a combination of pressure and engagement would moderate Putin's behavior. That is the right approach, in theory, but it's now clear that we have underestimated the pressure needed to produce effective engagement, and we're going to have to step it up. This is not just about the politics of Syria and Ukraine anymore. It's now also about America, Europe, basic civilized norms and the integrity of our democratic institutions." George Robertson, a former UK defense secretary and NATO secretary-general, said that Obama had "allowed Putin to jump back on the world stage and test the resolve of the West", adding that the legacy of this disaster would last.

In mid-November 2016, the Kremlin accused president Obama's administration of trying to damage the U.S.' relationship with Russia to a degree that would render normalisation thereof impossible for the incoming administration of Donald Trump.

In December 2017, Mike Rogers, who was Chairman of the House of Representatives' Permanent Select Committee on Intelligence in 2011–2015, said that Obama and his inner circle had a habit of rejecting the idea that Russia under Putin was a resurgent and perilous adversary; and this dismissiveness on Russia "filter[ed] its way down".

==== Ukraine ====
In the wake of the Euromaidan protests the Obama administration embraced the new government of Prime Minister Arseniy Yatsenyuk. After Russia began to occupy the Crimean peninsula Obama warned Russia of "severe consequences" if Russia annexed the region and attempted to negotiate a withdraw of Russian troops. To date, all negotiations have been unsuccessful. On December 18, 2014, Obama signed into law Ukraine Freedom Support Act of 2014. Since early 2014, Russia has maintained de facto control over the peninsula.

== Middle East ==
The Wilsonian goal to promote democracy in the region seemed feasible when the Arab Spring broke out in 2010 and demanded democracy.

=== Afghanistan ===
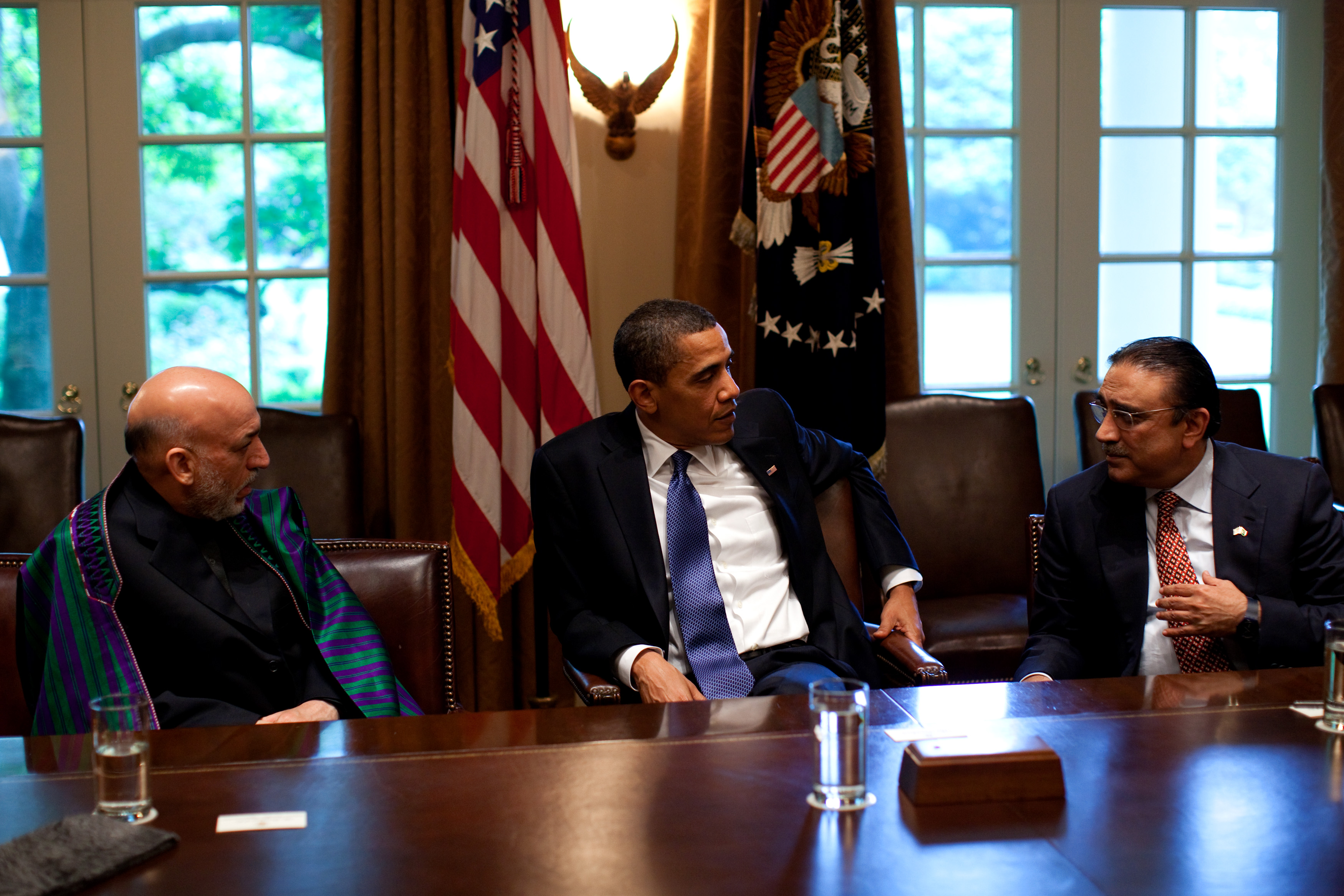
Asif Ali Zardari, Obama, and Hamid Karzai during a US-Afghan-Pakistan trilateral meeting

On February 18, 2009, Obama announced that the U.S. military presence in Afghanistan would be bolstered by 17,000 new troops by the summer.

On December 1, 2009, Obama stated that 30,000 troops would be added to Afghanistan.

The number of American soldiers in Afghanistan would peak at 100,000 in 2010. David Petraeus replaced McChrystal in June 2010, after McChrystal's staff criticized White House personnel in a magazine article.

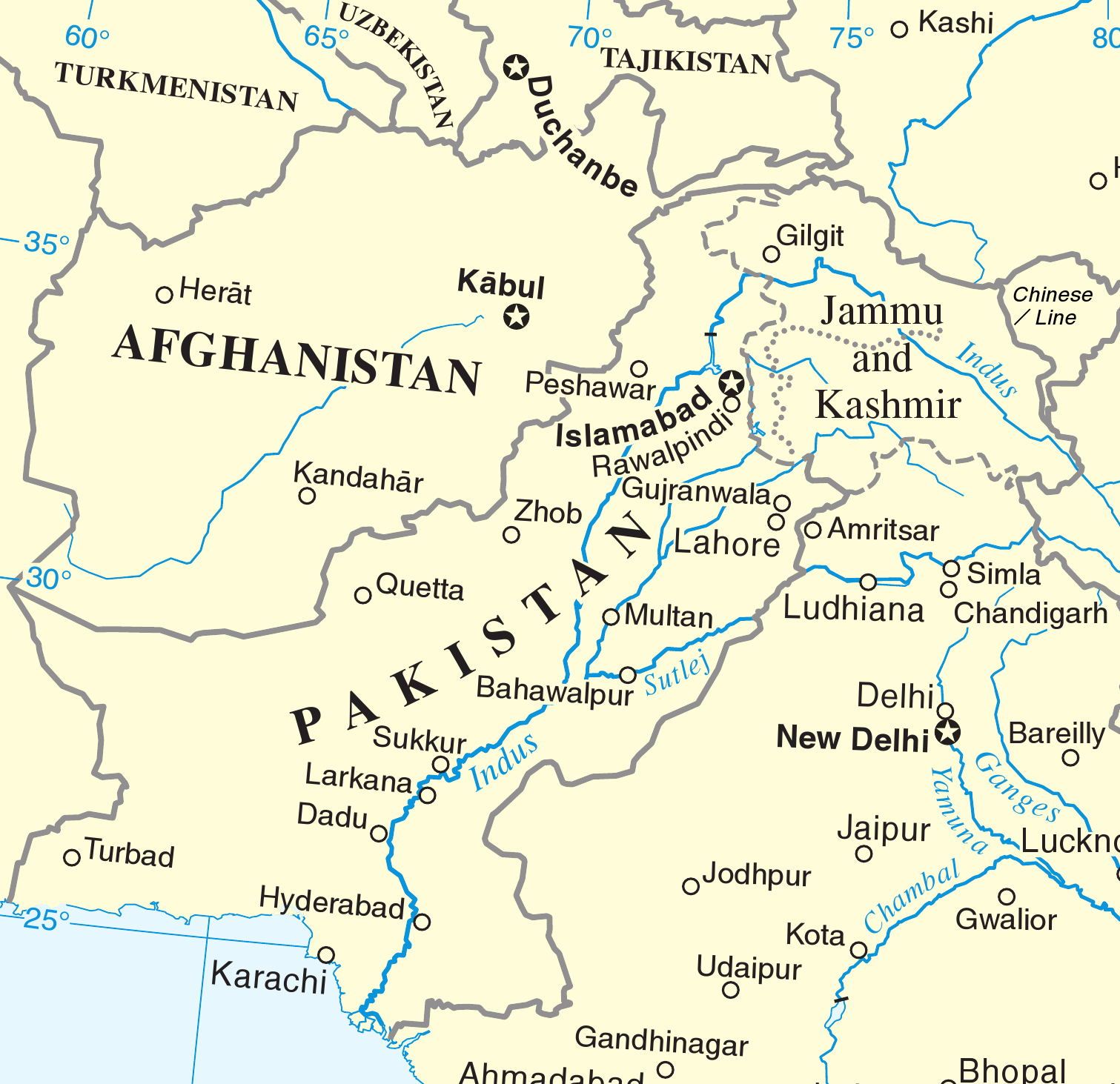
Afghanistan and Pakistan were considered a single theater of operations.

On June 22, 2011, Obama announced, "we will be able to remove 10,000 of our troops from Afghanistan by the end of this year, and we will bring home a total of 33,000 troops by next summer, fully recovering the surge I announced at West Point. After this initial reduction, our troops will continue coming home at a steady pace as Afghan security forces move into the lead. Our mission will change from combat to support. By 2014, this process of transition will be complete, and the Afghan people will be responsible for their own security".

In 2012, the U.S. and Afghanistan signed a strategic partnership agreement in which the U.S. agreed to hand over major combat operation to Afghan forces. That same year, the Obama administration designated Afghanistan as a major non-NATO ally.

In February 2013, Obama said the U.S. military would reduce the troop level in Afghanistan from 68,000 to 34,000 U.S. troops by February 2014.

In 2014, Obama announced that most troops would leave Afghanistan by late 2016, with a small force remaining at the US embassy. In September 2014, Ashraf Ghani succeeded Hamid Karzai as the President of Afghanistan after the U.S. helped negotiate a power-sharing agreement between Ghani and Abdullah Abdullah.

On January 1, 2015, the U.S. military ended Operation Enduring Freedom and began Resolute Support Mission, in which the U.S. shifted to more of a training role, although some combat operations continued.

In January 2015, United States Forces began conducting drone strikes in Afghanistan under the direction of the administration of the United States President Barack Obama against Taliban militants, Pakistani Taliban (TTP) militants, ISIL branch in Afghanistan militants and Al-Qaeda militants.

In October 2015, Obama announced that U.S. soldiers would remain in Afghanistan indefinitely in order support the Afghan government in the civil war against the Taliban, al-Qaeda, and ISIL. Joint Chiefs of Staff Chair Martin Dempsey framed the decision to keep soldiers in Afghanistan as part of a long-term counter-terrorism operation stretching across Central Asia. Obama left office with roughly 8,400 U.S. soldiers remaining in Afghanistan. President Joe Biden suddenly removed them all in August 2021.

=== Bahrain ===
Some in the media questioned Obama's decision to welcome Bahrain in Prince Salman bin Hamad al-Khalifa in June 2011 because of the fierce crackdown on protesters in the country. The collaboration of Saudi Arabia and the other Gulf states with Bahrains royalty, had carried out mass repression since the middle of March. This included detaining, beating and torture of thousands. In June 2013, Obama urged meaningful reform in Bahrain. Bahraini officials rejected Obama's claims about sectarianism between Sunnis and Shias. Nevertheless, the Obama administration resumed arms sales and maintenance to the government while the pro-democracy protests and crackdown were ongoing, including ammunition, combat vehicle parts, communications equipment, Blackhawk helicopters, and an unidentified missile system. In Bahrain, the administration's policy was to urge protesters to work with existing rulers toward what officials called "regime alteration."

=== Egypt ===
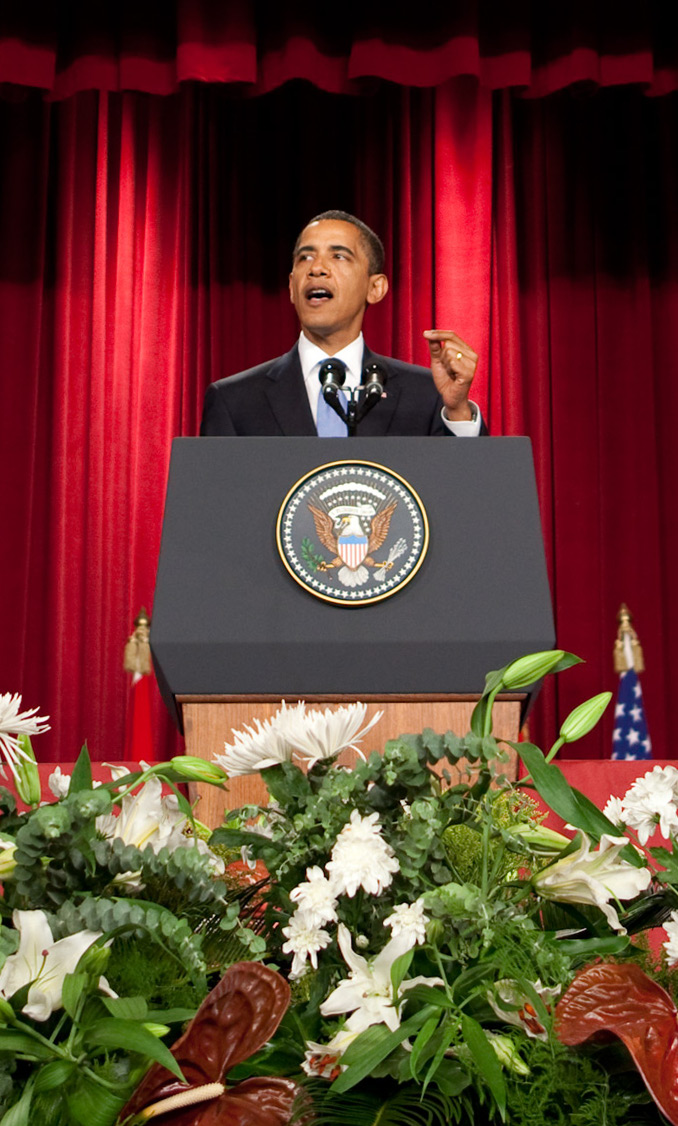
Obama speaking on "A New Beginning" at Cairo University on June 4, 2009

After escalating demonstrations challenged the long-standing strong-man rule of Egyptian President Hosni Mubarak, Obama and many European leaders called for him to step down and he did so in 2011. The Egyptians elected a new government based on the Muslim Brotherhood. However, the new President Mohamed Morsi was overthrown in 2013 by the military. President Obama strongly criticized the military takeover and the situations at the end of 2013 remained very tense. In 2015, the Obama administration lifted the freeze of weapons to Egypt, allowing the $1.3 billion annual shipment of arms to resume.

=== Iran ===
Iran–United States relations during the Obama administration (2009–2017) shifted from confrontation to cautious engagement, culminating in the 2015 nuclear deal. Early overtures gave way to tension after Ahmadinejad's disputed 2009 re-election and Iran's threats to close the Strait of Hormuz in 2011–2012, which the U.S. condemned and responded to by reinforcing its military presence in the region. Rouhani's 2013 election led to renewed diplomacy, including a Obama's phone call with Rounani and progress toward a deal. The Joint Comprehensive Plan of Action (JCPOA) in 2015 limited Iran's nuclear program in exchange for sanctions relief. Despite this, disputes over missiles, sanctions, and political criticism persisted.

=== Iraq ===
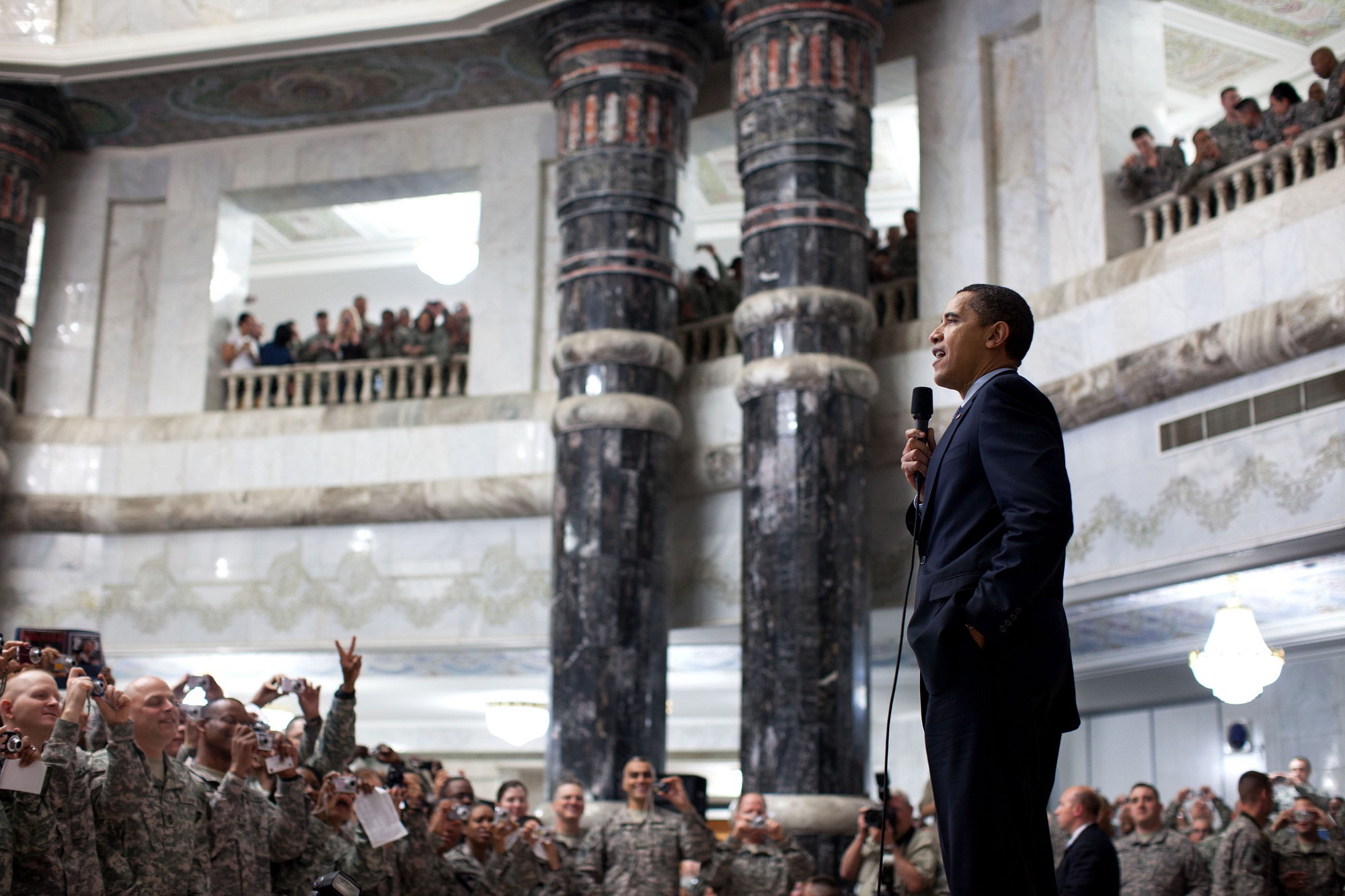
President Obama speaks with US troops at Camp Victory, Iraq, April 2009.

During his campaign for the presidency, Obama advocated a phased redeployment of troops out of Iraq within 16 months of being sworn in as president. In order to accomplish this Obama stated that he would, based on the conditions on the ground, redeploy between one and two battalions a month. Some of the forces returned to the U.S., while others were redeployed as part of a focus on the broader region including Afghanistan and Pakistan to confront terrorism.

Obama was in office for 3 years of the Iraq war. The U.S. gradually completed its withdrawal of military personnel in December 2011. In late February 2009, newly elected U.S. President Barack Obama announced an 18-month withdrawal window for combat forces, with approximately 50,000 soldiers remaining in the country. In November 2013 Obama met with Iraqi prime minister Nouri Maliki. He vowed a continuing partnership but said there would be no public aid, and urged to prime minister to be more inclusive, especially with regards to the Sunni population. Obama also encouraged wider political participation and passing an election law. They discussed how to curb a resurgent al-Qaeda and how to more thoroughly incorporate democracy in the country. President Obama changed the timeline of withdrawing troops from Iraq within 16 months of his taking office as outlined in the election to 19 months after taking office. Obama appointed a Special Envoy for Middle East peace (George Mitchell) and a Special Envoy to Afghanistan and Pakistan (Richard C. Holbrooke). In 2013, Obama urged the leaders of the Middle East to do more to stem or address the multiple locations where Sunni-Shia strife is occurring in the middle east, including in Bahrain, Syria and Iraq.

==== 2014 intervention ====
After ISIS emerged with a 2014 Northern Iraq offensive and shattered the Iraqi military, Obama deployed thousands of American Marines, Special Forces troops and military advisers to shore up the remaining Iraqi forces. These troops were also tasked with securing the area around the American Embassy in Baghdad as well as taking control of the International Airport. Obama said that the actions of these men would be "targeted and precise".

The administration also moved a carrier battle group in to the Persian Gulf. Americans have been flying extensive reconnaissance flights, both manned and unmanned. American F-18 attack aircraft have also been spotted in the skies over Iraq since mid-summer.

In early August the Administration announced a wide-ranging air campaign in northern Iraq aimed at Sunni militants, while undertaking a significant humanitarian efforts aimed at Iraq's imperiled minorities.

=== Israel ===
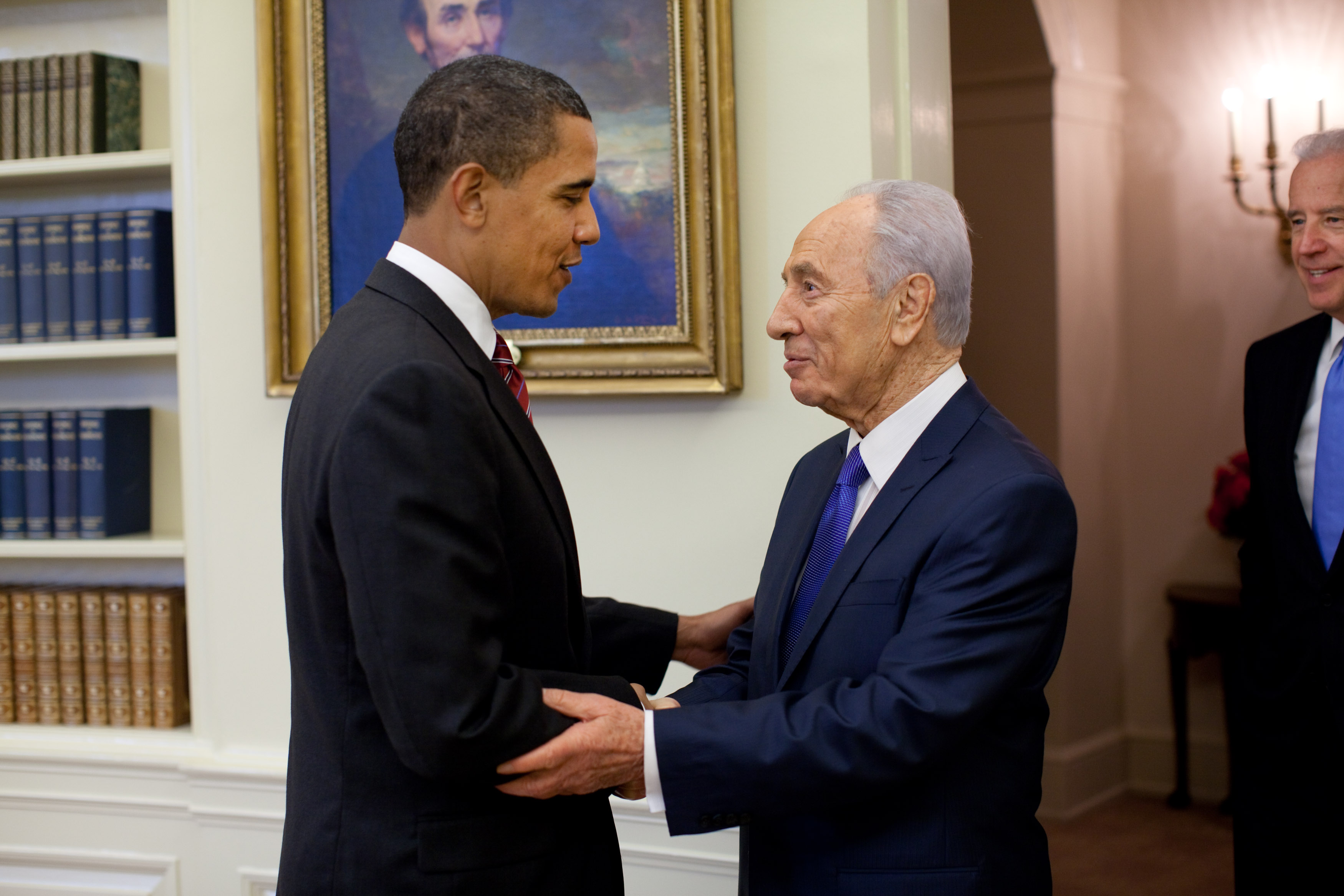
President Obama and Israeli President Shimon Peres, May 2009

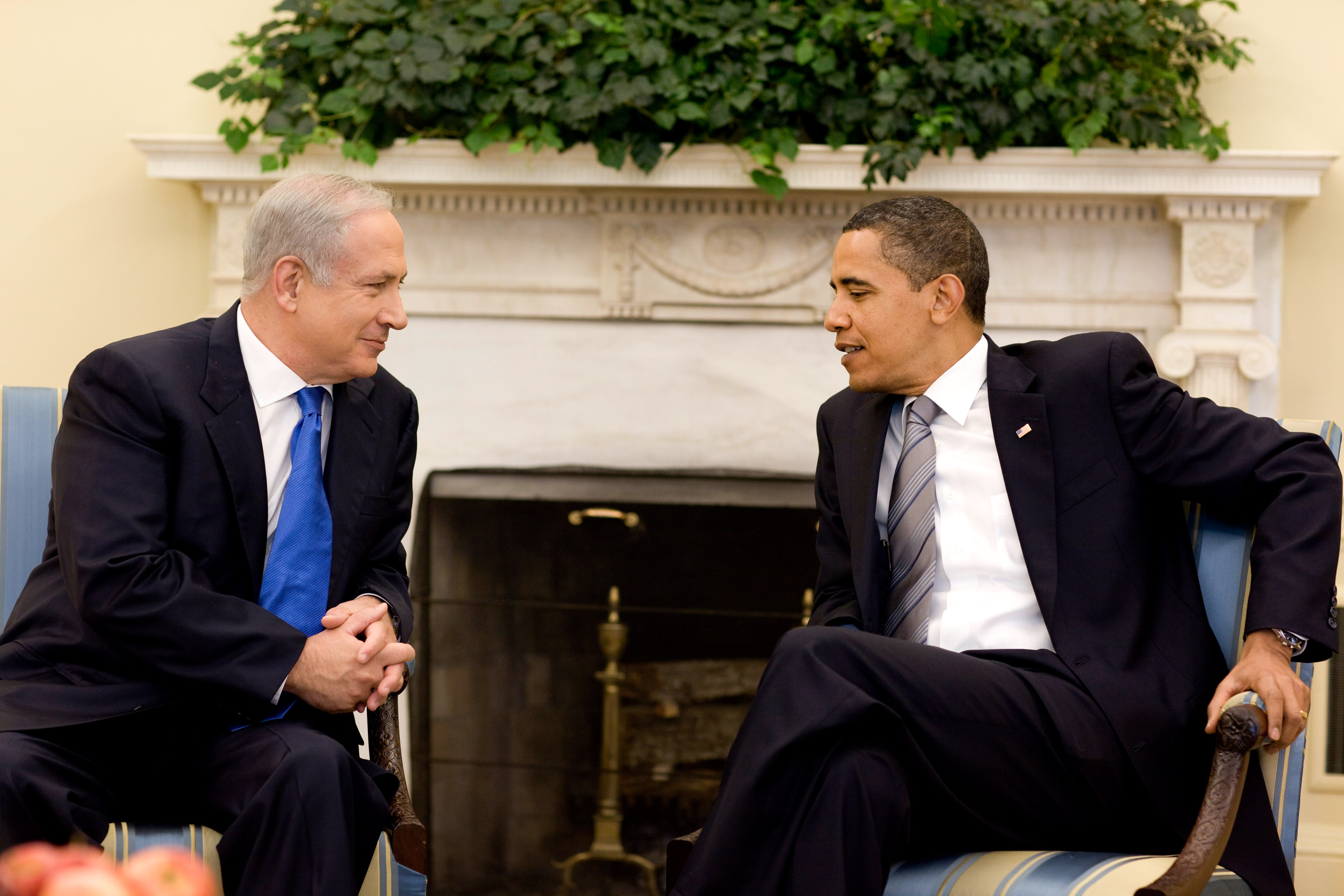
President Obama and Israeli Prime Minister Benjamin Netanyahu, May 2009

Israel announced it was pushing ahead with building 1,600 new homes in a Jewish area in East Jerusalem in March 2010, as Vice-president Joe Biden was visiting. It was described as "one of the most serious rows between the two allies in recent decades". Secretary of State Clinton said Israel's move was "deeply negative" for US-Israeli relations. However Obama was the first United States president to supply Israel with modern bunker buster bombs. And under Obama, United States Foreign Military Financing for Israel increased to $3 billion for the first time in history. Obama pledged support for Israeli military superiority in the region and described his allegiance with Israel as being "sacrosanct". Under President Obama, the United States increased aid for Israel's Iron Dome.

In February 2011, the administration vetoed a U.N. resolution declaring Israeli settlements in the West Bank illegal. On September 20, 2011, President Obama declared that the U.S. would veto a Palestinian application for statehood at the United Nations, asserting that "there can be no shortcut to peace".

In 2014 Obama said that only a two-state solution could ensure Israel's future as a Jewish-majority democracy. Ehud Barak described Obama's support for Israel as being unparalleled and the most supportive in history, stating that Obama had done "more than anything that I can remember in the past" and that Obama's support is "extremely deep and profound".

In September 2016, following ten months of negotiations, the United States and Israel agreed to a 10-year Memorandum of Understanding, providing $38 billion in military aid to Israel across the period of FY2019-FY2028 ($3.8 billion per year), making it the largest aid package in US history.

On December 23, 2016, the United States, under the Obama administration, abstained from United Nations Security Council Resolution 2334, effectively allowing it to pass. On December 28, U.S. Secretary of State John Kerry strongly criticized Israel and its settlement policies in a speech. Israeli Prime Minister Benjamin Netanyahu strongly criticized the administration's actions, and the Israeli government withdrew its annual dues from the organization, which totaled $6 million in United States dollars, on January 6, 2017. On January 5, 2017, the United States House of Representatives voted 342–80 to condemn the UN Resolution.

=== Saudi Arabia ===
The United States and Saudi Arabia continued their post-war alliance during the Obama presidency, and the Obama administration supported the Saudi Arabian-led intervention in Yemen during the Yemeni Civil War. However, tensions between the Saudis and the United States arose following the Iranian nuclear deal, as Saudi Arabia and Iran have strained relations and have competed for influence in the Middle East. The Obama administration attempted to defuse tensions between the two countries, as it hoped for cooperation with both countries in regards to the Syrian Civil War and military operations against ISIS. Obama also criticized the human rights record of Saudi Arabia, particularly in regards to the imprisonment of Raif Badawi. When once asked whether Saudi Arabia was America's friend, Obama replied with "It's complicated." According to The Economist, opining in April 2016, thanks in large part to Obama, America's relationship with Saudi Arabia had become "deeply strained" under his tenure.

Despite fierce opposition on the part of the Saudi government, the U.S. Congress passed and then overrode Obama's veto of the Justice Against Sponsors of Terrorism Act.

=== Syria ===
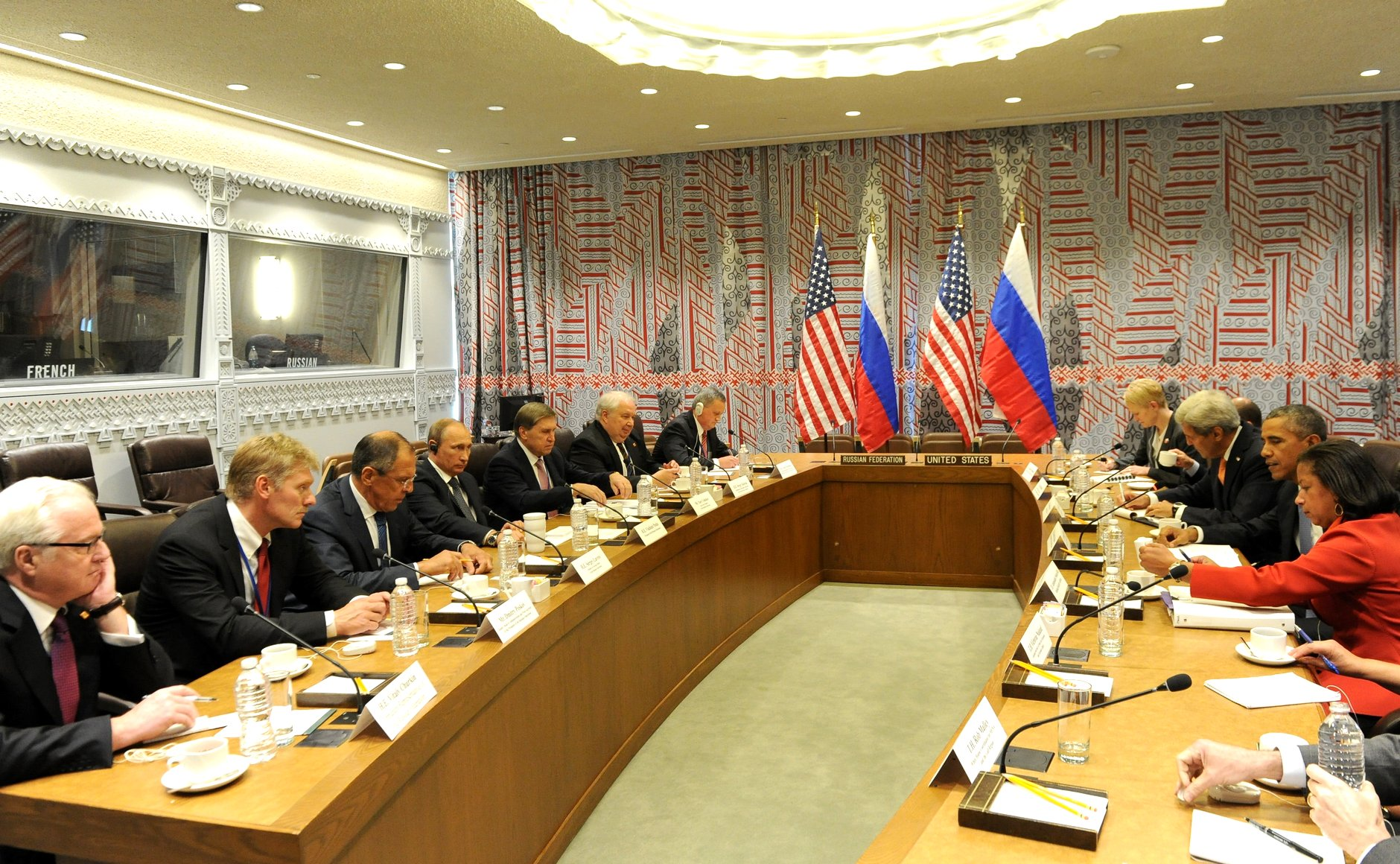
President Obama meets with Russian President Vladimir Putin to discuss Syria and ISIL, September 29, 2015.

In 2012, Obama, who had previously demanded the resignation of Syria's president Bashar al-Assad, said that the use of chemical weapons by the Assad government would be crossing a red line and would entail U.S. military action. After reports on 21 August 2013 about the usage of chemical weapons in Syria, the Obama administration formally blamed the incident on the Syrian government and sought congressional approval for military action in Syria. Besides, Obama sought support from Britain and France for an attack in Syria. The Defense Secretary Chuck Hagel approved plans for a barrage of Tomahawk cruise missile strikes to have those called off by Obama in September. On 11 September 2013, Obama put a military strike or combat operations on hold and achieved an agreement with Russia and the Syrian government to destroy all chemical weapons in Syria.

Obama's decision to allow the violation of a red line he himself had drawn to go unpunished was widely criticized by the U.S. political establishment and some U.S. allies as being detrimental to America's international credibility. However, in early 2016, Obama said he was "proud" of his decision, which repudiated what he referred to as the "Washington playbook" and avoided entangling the US in yet another "unfixable" situation in the Middle East. More broadly, regarding Obama's lack of meaningful support to the Syrian anti-government rebels, in 2015, The Economist opined, "Rarely has an American president so abjectly abandoned his global responsibility", adding in 2016, "The agony of Syria is the biggest moral stain on Barack Obama's presidency. And the chaos rippling from Syria—where many now turn to al-Qaeda, not the West, for salvation—is his greatest geopolitical failure." In 2016, Nicholas Kristof described inaction in Syria as "Obama's worst mistake", while Jonathan Schanzer said "the White House Syria policy has been an unmitigated dumpster fire." Michael Mullen, former chairman of the joint chiefs of staff, described the conflict in Syria as "Obama's Rwanda". This is in lieu of the CIA-backed operation Timber Sycamore, which provide weapons and trainings to anti-government rebels, but proved to be ineffective by the end of the Obama presidency.

In comments published on 1 December 2016 about the U.S. becoming increasingly sidelined by Moscow and Ankara, Emile Hokayem of the International Institute for Strategic Studies blamed the marginalisation of the U.S. in the Syrian Civil War and the region at large on Barack Obama, "The American approach to this conflict guaranteed the US less and less relevance, not just in the Syrian conflict but also the broader regional dynamics. There has been a loss of face and a loss of leverage. The politics of the region are being transformed and this happened under Obama, whether by design or by failure."

In 2017, as Russia on the back of its successful military campaign in Syria forged closer ties with Turkey and Saudi Arabia, analysts and politicians in the Middle East concurred that Russia's clout in the region had grown “because Obama allowed it to’’ by failing to intervene robustly in Syria.

==== The "Red Line" ultimatum ====
The Obama "Red Line" remark was intended as an ultimatum to the Syrian president and the Syrian army to cease the use of chemical weapons. It appeared in a presidential statement on 20 August 2012. Obama's red line was enforced by means of threat of massive military force in September 2013 and resulted in the substantial destruction of the Syrian stockpile of chemical weapons by June 2014.

Obama stated, "We have been very clear to the Assad regime, but also to other players on the ground, that a red line for us is we start seeing a whole bunch of chemical weapons moving around or being utilized. That would change my calculus. That would change my equation."

One year later, in the early hours of 21 August 2013, two opposition-controlled areas in the suburbs around Damascus, Syria were struck by rockets containing the chemical agent sarin. The attack was the deadliest use of chemical weapons since the Iran–Iraq War.

A U.S.-led military attack to punish Syria for using chemical weapons was anticipated by the end of August 2013 in which American forces and their allies launched more than 100 missiles into Syria.

The U.S. Navy brought four destroyers into position in the eastern Mediterranean to reach targets inside Syria. The USS Nimitz carrier group was rerouted to Syria in early September 2013.

Russia and Great Britain among other nations began evacuating their citizens in anticipation of the bombardment.

During the G20 summit on 6 September, Vladimir Putin and Obama discussed the idea of putting Syria's chemical weapons under international control. On 9 September 2013, Kerry stated in response to a question from a journalist that the air strikes could be averted if Syria turned over "every single bit" of its chemical weapons stockpiles within a week, but Syria "isn't about to do it and it can't be done." State Department officials stressed that Kerry's statement and its one-week deadline were rhetorical in light of the unlikelihood of Syria turning over its chemical weapons. Hours after Kerry's statement, Russian foreign minister Sergey Lavrov announced that Russia had suggested to Syria that it relinquish its chemical weapons, and Syrian foreign minister Walid al-Moallem immediately welcomed the proposal.

U.S.–Russian negotiations led to the 14 September 2013 "Framework for Elimination of Syrian Chemical Weapons," which called for the elimination of Syria's chemical weapon stockpiles by mid-2014. Following the agreement, Syria acceded to the Chemical Weapons Convention and agreed to apply that convention provisionally until its entry into force on 14 October 2013. On 21 September, Syria ostensibly provided an inventory of its chemical weapons to the Organisation for the Prohibition of Chemical Weapons (OPCW), before the deadline set by the framework.

The destruction of Syria's chemical weapons began on the basis of international agreements with Syria that stipulated an initial destruction deadline of 30 June 2014. UN Security Council Resolution 2118 of 27 September 2013 required Syria to assume responsibility for and follow a timeline for the destruction of its chemical weapons and its chemical weapon production facilities. The Security Council resolution bound Syria to the implementation plan presented in a decision of the OPCW. On 23 June 2014, the last declared chemical weapons left Syria. The destruction of the most dangerous chemical weapons was performed at sea aboard the Cape Ray, a vessel of the United States Maritime Administration's Ready Reserve Force, crewed with US civilian merchant mariners. The actual destruction operations, performed by a team of U.S. Army civilians and contractors, destroyed 600 metric tons of chemical agents in 42 days.

=== Yemen ===
President Barack Obama said in March 2015 that he has authorized U.S. soldiers to give logistical and intelligence aid to the Saudis in their military action in Yemen, launching a "Joint Planning Cell" with Saudi Arabia. This support involves aerial refueling, which allows coalition aircraft to spend more time over Yemen, and allowing some coalition members to home base aircraft instead of transferring them to Saudi Arabia.

During the Obama Administration, The United States has also been criticised for allegedly supplying cluster munitions to Saudi Arabian forces. Cluster munitions are often considered unacceptable due their largely indiscriminate function and high risk of unexploded munitions. The United States is not party to the Cluster Munition Coalition, which bans the use of Cluster munitions. Human Rights Watch argued in August 2016 that the United States' direct support of the Saudi forces, in particular in providing intelligence and in-air refueling has made it a party to the conflict.

On 13 October 2016, the USS Nitze fired Tomahawk missiles against Houthi-controlled radar installations "in the Dhubab district of Taiz province, a remote area overlooking the Bab al-Mandab Strait known for fishing and smuggling."

In October 2016, Reuters obtained documents under the Freedom of Information Act showing officials had warned that the United States could be implicated in war crimes for its support of Saudi Arabia's intervention.

== Oceania ==
=== New Zealand ===
The Obama administration continued to develop closer relations with New Zealand, particularly in the area of defense and intelligence cooperation. Relations with the National government led by Prime Minister John Key have been smooth and friendly. This process had already begun under the previous George W. Bush administration in 2007, which culminated in a state visit by the-then Labour Prime Minister Helen Clark to the United States in July 2008. While the United States and New Zealand had been close allies since World War II and were members of the tripartite ANZUS security alliance with Australia, US-NZ bilateral relations had deteriorated under the Ronald Reagan Administration in February 1985 due to New Zealand's anti-nuclear policy which banned visits by nuclear-capable or nuclear-powered warships. As a result, no bilateral military exercises had taken place until April 2012 and New Zealand warships were barred from visiting US ports and participating in joint naval exercises until May 2013.

On 4 November 2010, Secretary of State Hillary Clinton and her New Zealand counterpart Minister of Foreign Affairs Murray McCully signed the Wellington Declaration which committed the two countries to a closer bilateral relationship with an increased emphasis on strategic partnership. This strategic partnership had two fundamental elements: "a new focus on practical cooperation in the Pacific region; and enhanced political and subject-matter dialogue—including regular Foreign Ministers' meetings and political-military discussions." The agreement also stressed the continued need for New Zealand and the United States to work together on global issues like nuclear proliferation, climate change and terrorism.

Following the 2011 Christchurch earthquake, President Obama expressed his condolences to Prime Minister Key. The US government also contributed $1 million in relief funds while the United States Agency for International Development (USAID) and the Los Angeles County Fire Department contributed rescue teams. On 23 July 2011, Prime Minister John Key also visited President Obama at the White House. The John Key National government also continued to contribute military forces to support the US-led War in Afghanistan, including the elite New Zealand Special Air Service. The previous Labour government had also contributed military forces to Afghanistan since October 2001. In April 2013, the last remaining NZ troops withdrew from Afghanistan.

On 19 June 2012, Secretary of Defense Leon Panetta and his New Zealand counterpart Minister of Defence Jonathan Coleman signed the Washington Declaration which committed the US and New Zealand to a closer defense cooperation arrangement. It sought to restore defense cooperation between the two countries which had been curtailed by the ANZUS Split. Two key areas of this Declaration included the resumption of regular senior-level dialogues between the US Department of Defense and the New Zealand Ministry of Defence and the New Zealand Defence Force; and security cooperation. As a result of the Washington Declaration, New Zealand warships were allowed to visit US ports even though New Zealand's anti-nuclear policy remained intact. The Washington Declaration was also part of the Obama administration's pivot into the Asia-Pacific to counter the emerging influence of China.

== Sub-Saharan Africa ==
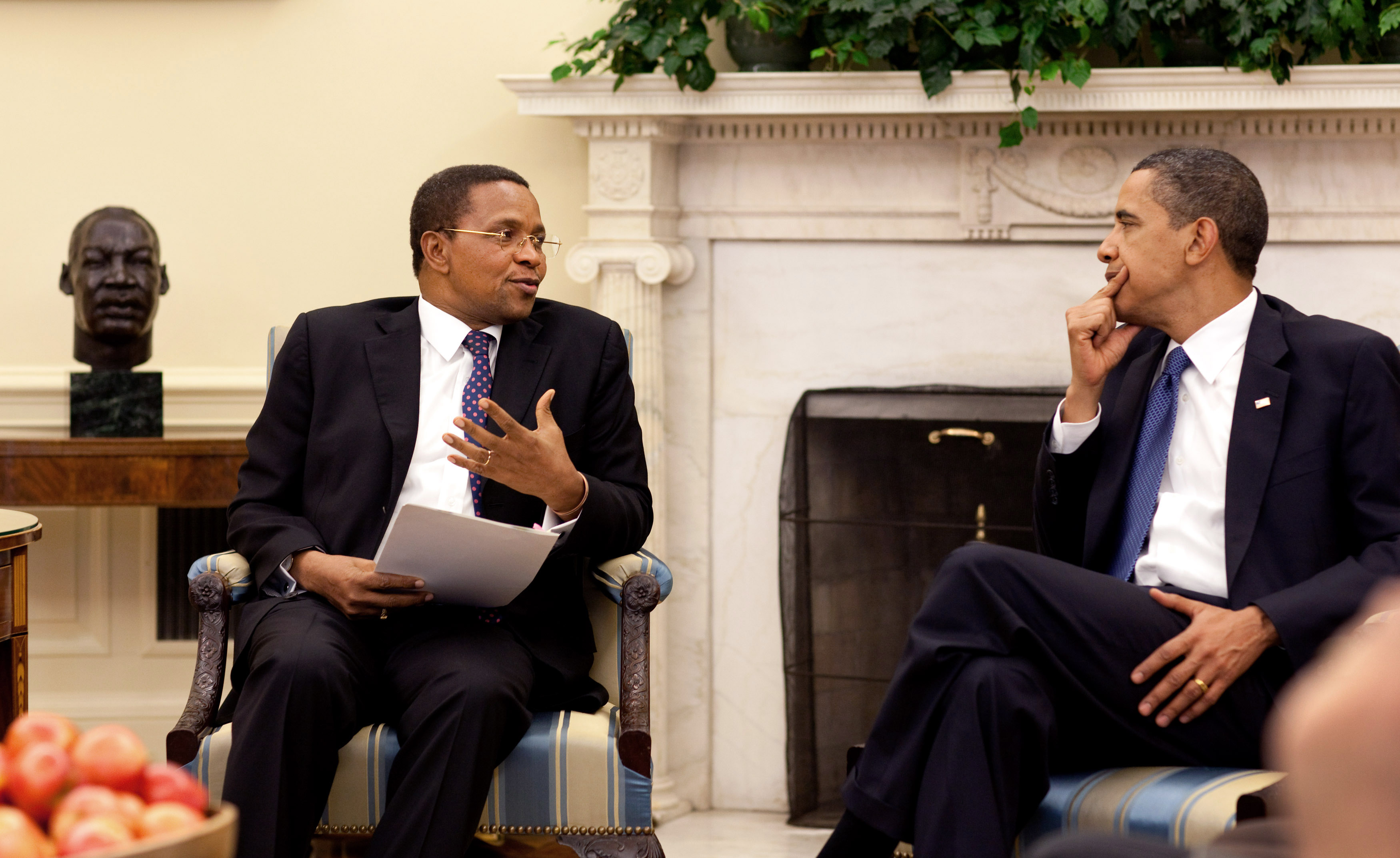
Tanzanian President Jakaya Kikwete was the first African Head of State to meet Obama.

During the 2008 campaign, Obama outlined his priorities for developing an Africa policy including taking action to stop "what U.S. officials have termed genocide in Darfur, fighting poverty, and expanding prosperity." Some analysts believed that Obama's appointment of Susan Rice who was a former assistant secretary of state for African affairs, as U.S. ambassador to the United Nations was a sign that his administration would prioritize the continent.

Then Secretary of State-designate Hillary Clinton, in a January 13 hearing of the Senate Foreign Relations Committee, said that the administration priorities would include "combating al-Qaida's efforts to seek safe havens in failed states in the Horn of Africa; helping African nations to conserve their natural resources and reap fair benefits from them; stopping war in Congo; [and] ending autocracy in Zimbabwe and human devastation in Darfur."

Darfur, Eastern Congo, Ghana and Zimbabwe have all played a significant role in the United States Africa policy. Some foreign policy analysts believed that conflicts in "Sudan, Somalia, and eastern Congo" would "eclipse any other policy plans."

President Obama visited Cairo, Egypt, where he addressed the "Muslim world" on June 4 and followed this trip with his first visit to sub-Saharan Africa, as president, on July 11, 2009, where he addressed Ghana's Parliament.

He was followed by Secretary of State Hillary Clinton who took a seven nation trip to Africa in August including stops in Angola, Cape Verde, Democratic Republic of the Congo, Kenya, Liberia, Nigeria and South Africa. Some foreign policy analysts have made the claim that this is "the earliest in any U.S. administration that both the president and the secretary of state have visited Africa."

Obama spoke in front of the African Union in Addis Ababa, Ethiopia, on July 29, 2015, the first sitting U.S. president to do so. He gave a speech encouraging the world to increase economic ties via investments and trade with the continent, and lauded the progress made in education, infrastructure, and economy. He also criticized the lack of democracy and leaders who refuse to step aside, discrimination against minorities (LGBT people, religious groups and ethnicities), and corruption. He suggested an intensified democratization and free trade, to significantly improve the quality of life for Africans.

=== Central Africa ===
==== Democratic Republic of Congo ====
The Obama administration's foreign policy in Africa was conducted primarily through the bureaucratic apparatus of the State Department, with both Secretaries of State Clinton and Kerry playing notable and well-publicized roles in African affairs. In 2009, Secretary Clinton undertook a tour of seven African nations, including Angola, Cape Verde, Democratic Republic of Congo, Kenya, Liberia, Nigeria, and South Africa. During her visit to the DRC, Secretary Clinton met with rape survivors and later announced a $17 million plan for addressing sexual violence in the Democratic Republic of the Congo (DRC). Throughout her tenure, Secretary Clinton has issued numerous statements addressing gender-based violence and other human rights abuses in the DRC on in accordance with her goal of improving the status of women and girls around the world.

In 2013, then-Secretary of State John Kerry sought to draw greater attention to conflict and humanitarian crisis in DRC and surrounding countries, leading to the appointment of former Senator Russell Feingold to the position of Special Envoy to the Great Lakes Region. Founder of the Eastern Congo Initiative Ben Affleck testified to Congress in 2014 that Feingold's collaboration with his U.N. counterpart and other international actors had begun to remedy a previously incoherent international response to humanitarian crisis in the DRC. At Feingold's urging, the Obama administration invoked the Child Soldiers Prevention Act in order to place sanctions on Rwanda for their support of the March 23 militia (M23). These actions may have led to the end of the two-year M23 insurgency.

While the Obama administration received positive feedback for the invocation of the Child Soldiers Prevention Act against Rwanda, it was criticized for ignoring evidence that the Congolese government also made wide use of child soldiers.

===== The Dodd-Frank Wall Street Reform and Consumer Protection Act =====
The Dodd-Frank Wall Street Reform and Consumer Protection Act was signed into law in 2010. Under Section 1502 of the Act, all corporations that use tantalum, tungsten, tin, and gold are mandated to trace these potential “conflict minerals” to their source and to publicly disclose if they originated in the DRC, with the objective being to discourage corporate activities that contribute to conflict in the DRC. Intended to promote human rights and divert resources from continued fighting, the law has widely been criticized by American companies who cite the cost and difficulty of tracking and certifying materials as barriers to implementation. Critics also argue that Section 1502 misunderstands and misrepresents the role that minerals play in conflict, resulting in legislation that has produced no notable change in levels of conflict. Instead, a “de facto” embargo has ensued which has propelled between 5 and 12 million Congolese miners into unemployment and deeper poverty.

=== East Africa ===
==== Kenya and piracy ====
One of the first actions of the Obama administration was to sign a memorandum of understanding with Kenya to allow pirates captured off of Kenya's coast to be tried in Kenyan courts.

Somali pirates took Richard Phillips, a captain of an American cargo ship, hostage on April 8, 2009, during a failed attempt to take over the Maersk Alabama. President Obama ordered the U.S. military to conduct a rescue mission to free Phillips who was held hostage by the pirates for five days. He was rescued on April 12, 2009, by United States Navy SEALs who killed three pirates and obtained the surrender of a fourth, Abduwali Muse.

The Obama administration's reaction and response to the kidnapping of Phillips had been commended as well as criticized, while others downplay his role in the rescue of Richard Phillips. In 2014, Obama sought to increase operations in the Horn region in response to the Westgate mall attack in Kenya. A taskforce for the Horn peninsula had initiated drone strikes against pirates and al-Qaeda affiliates.

During his July 2015 trip to Addis Ababa, Obama also was the first U.S. president ever to visit Kenya, which is the homeland of his father.

==== Somalia ====
The Administration had been interested in propping up the Transitional National Government in Mogadishu. To this end, as well as to help cut down on terrorist activities and piracy in the region, the United States had deployed special operations forces, drones, air strikes and some military advisers to influence the ongoing Somali civil war and neutralize prominent Al-Shabaab members.

==== Zimbabwe ====
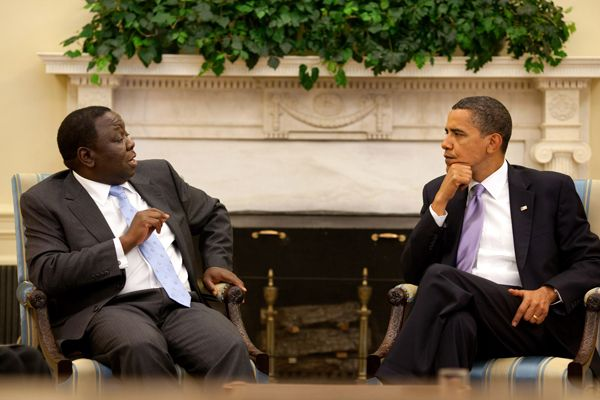
Tsvangirai meets with Obama in the White House in June 2009.

Obama was a strong critic of the government of Zimbabwe led by President Robert Mugabe. Although Obama congratulated longtime opposition leader Morgan Tsvangirai on becoming Prime Minister of Zimbabwe under a power-sharing agreement, U.S. State Department spokesman Robert Wood warned, "We need to see evidence of good governance and particularly real, true power sharing on the part of Robert Mugabe before we are going to make any kind of commitment" to lifting economic sanctions on the impoverished Southern African country, which was ruled by Mugabe from independence in 1980 to 2017. In early March 2009, Obama proclaimed that US sanctions would be provisionally extended for another year, because Zimbabwe's political crisis as yet unresolved.

After the death of Susan Tsvangirai, the prime minister's wife, in an automobile collision in central Zimbabwe on March 6, 2009, the U.S. State Department expressed condolences to Tsvangirai, who also received minor injuries in the wreck. Prime Minister Tsvangirai met with President Obama on June 12, 2009, at the White House.

=== West Africa ===
==== Mali ====
Under Obama, the U.S. government supported in Malian government in the Northern Mali conflict, aiding Mali in its fight against Tuareg rebels and their Islamist extremist allies, including Ansar Dine, which the U.S. designed as a foreign terrorist organization in 2013. The U.S. provided counterterrorism, intelligence-sharing and other aid to the French military, which led an effort "to drive out insurgents and protect a civilian Malian government." The U.S. also provided logistical support, specifically by providing aerial refueling to the French Air Force.

The Obama administration had pledged not to put "boots on the ground" in Mali, but in April 2013, the U.S. Department of Defense disclosed that it had deployed 22 U.S. military personnel to the country. Of these, ten were liaison support staff to French and African forces, while the others were assigned to the U.S. Embassy in Bamako; the U.S. troops did not engage in combat operations in Mali.

== Other issues ==
=== United Nations ===
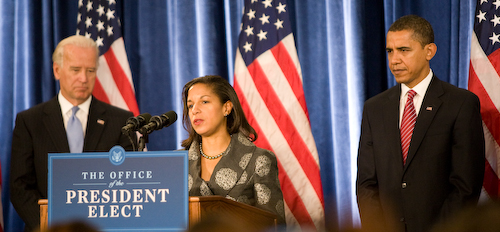
Rice with Barack Obama and Joe Biden, December 2008

On December 1, 2008, President-elect Obama announced that he would nominate Rice to be the United States ambassador to the United Nations. Rice was the first black woman named to be US envoy to UN.

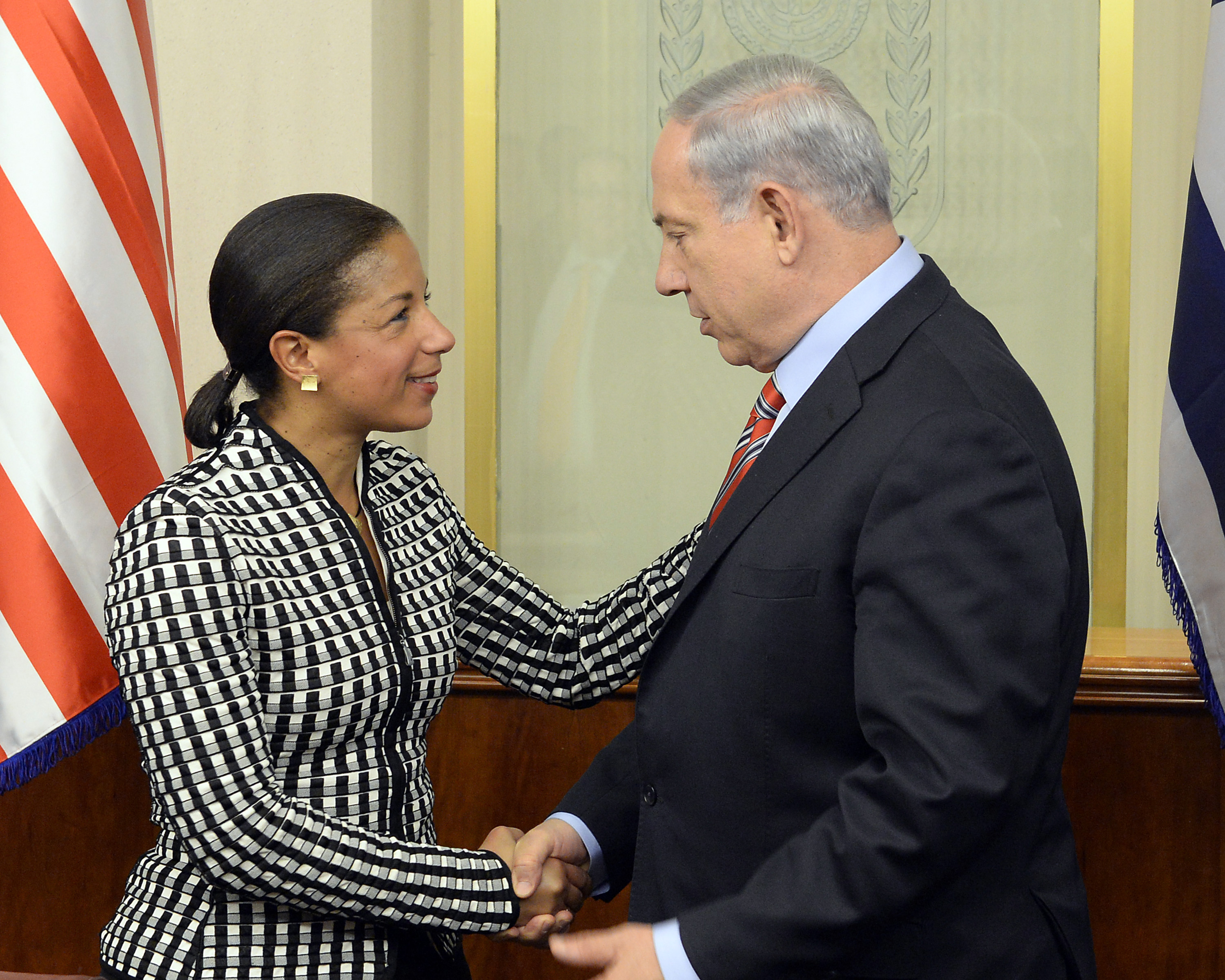
Rice meets with Israeli Prime Minister Benjamin Netanyahu, May 2014.

During her tenure at the UN, Rice championed a human rights and anti-poverty agenda, elevated climate change and women's rights as global priorities. She committed the U.S. to agreements such as the Nuclear Non-Proliferation Treaty, Convention on the Rights of Persons with Disabilities, and the U.N. Millennium Development Goals. Rice led the fight to advance LGBT rights at the U.N. Human Rights Council and was recognized for her staunch defense of Israel at the Security Council. Rice won praise for leading the Security Council to impose the toughest sanctions to date on Iran and North Korea over their nuclear programs, and for reaffirming U.S. commitment to the UN and multilateralism.

Some human rights activists took issue with Rice and U.S. foreign policy generally in 2012 for working against UN statements that criticized Rwanda for supporting a rebel group in Congo known for committing atrocities.

=== Libyan Civil War ===
As the 2011 Libyan Civil War progressed, the United States and its allies offered a choice for Colonel Muammar Gaddafi and his aides: step down from power or face an international response. Rice offered some of the toughest rhetoric toward Gaddafi, criticizing his denials of atrocities against his own citizens as "frankly, delusional." In a closed-door Security Council meeting in April 2011, Rice reportedly stated that Gaddafi loyalists engaged in atrocities, including terrorizing the population with sexual violence, and that Gaddafi's troops has been issued Viagra. Investigations by Amnesty International, Human Rights Watch and Doctors Without Borders contradicted Rice and stated they did not find first-hand evidence that mass rapes had occurred as Rice had claimed. Together with National Security Council figure Samantha Power, who already supported the U.S.-led military intervention in Libya, and Secretary of State Hillary Clinton, who came to support it, the three overcame internal opposition from Defense Secretary Robert Gates, security adviser Thomas E. Donilon, and counterterrorism adviser John Brennan, to have the administration advance a UN proposal to impose a no-fly zone over Libya and authorize other military actions as necessary.

After initial skepticism of international involvement to prevent Libyan leader Muammar Gaddafi from using violence to suppress popular demonstrations in his country, the Obama administration crucially backed United Nations Security Council Resolution 1973 to create a Libyan no-fly zone, with United States Ambassador to the United Nations Susan Rice successfully pushing to include language allowing the UN mandate free rein to launch air attacks on Libyan ground targets threatening civilians.

In March 2011, Obama authorized the firing of 110 Tomahawk cruise missiles against targets in Libya, in response to regime actions against rebel forces, to enforce the UN no-fly zone.

On March 17, 2011, the UK, France and Lebanon joined the U.S. to vote for United Nations Security Council Resolution 1973 while Brazil, Germany, and India joined permanent Security Council members China and Russia in abstaining. Rice and Clinton played major roles in gaining approval for the resolution. Rice said, "we are interested in a broad range of actions that will effectively protect civilians and increase the pressure on the Gaddafi regime to halt the killing and to allow the Libyan people to express themselves in their aspirations for the future freely and peacefully."

=== Syrian Civil War ===
In January 2012, after the Russian and Chinese veto of a Security Council resolution calling on Syrian president Bashar al-Assad to step down, Rice strongly condemned both countries, saying, "They put a stake in the heart of efforts to resolve this conflict peacefully," and adding that "we the United States are standing with the people of Syria. Russia and China are obviously with Assad." In her words, "the United States is disgusted that a couple of members of this Council continue to prevent us from fulfilling our sole purpose."

=== 2012 Benghazi attack ===
On September 11, 2012, a U.S. diplomatic facility and CIA annex in Benghazi, Libya, was attacked, resulting in the deaths of the United States ambassador to Libya J. Christopher Stevens, U.S. Foreign Service information management officer Sean Smith, and two former Navy SEALS, Glen Doherty and Tyrone S. Woods. On September 16, Rice appeared on five major interview shows to discuss the attacks. Prior to her appearance, Rice was provided with "talking points" from a CIA memo.

Each of the 11 drafts of CIA talking points maintained that the attack was "spontaneously inspired" by a violent protest at the American embassy in Cairo, Egypt, hours earlier, which had been triggered by the release of an anti-Muslim video. Protestors breached and entered the embassy compound. During the hours before the Benghazi attack, Egyptian satellite television networks popular in Benghazi had been covering the outrage over the video.

=== NSA spying scandal ===
In early 2013 Edward Snowden leaked to the media a trove of documents on the Obama administration's controversial mass surveillance campaign. These revelations have strained relationships between Obama and the foreign leaders that his administration is spying on. Fears of American spy software have also cost several American companies contracts for export work.

=== Muslim relations ===
On January 26, 2009, Obama gave his first formal interview as president to the Arabic-language television news channel Al Arabiya. Obama said that, "My job to the Muslim world is to communicate that the Americans are not your enemy." Obama mentioned that he had spent several years growing up in the world's most populous Muslim nation, Indonesia, and called for resumed negotiations between Israel and Palestinians. Obama's gesture in reaching out to the Muslim world was unprecedented for a U.S. president.

President Obama's first trip to a Muslim majority country occurred on April 6–7, 2009 when he visited Turkey and spoke to the Grand National Assembly.

President Obama addressed the Muslim world in a speech in Cairo, Egypt on June 4, 2009. In that speech President Obama issued a call for "a new beginning" in the relationship between the United States and Muslims around the world. He outlined his ideas about "engaging the Muslim world" and how to create "a new beginning."

Farah Pandith was appointed as the State Department's "first ever Special Representative to Muslim Communities" and was sworn in on September 15, 2009.

She describes her responsibilities as including actively listening and responding to "the concerns of Muslims in Europe, Africa, and Asia."

=== Missile defense ===
In 2012 Obama promised more flexibility on missile defense after his reelection, this flexibility was demonstrated the next year when Kerry offered to reduce American defenses against Chinese missiles.

=== World Conference against racism ===
No information Switzerland (host country) Members of the conference's Bureau of the Preparatory Committee (who attended the conference) States (that are not part of the Preparatory Committee) that attended States that boycotted the Durban Review Conference

Barack Obama boycotted both World Conference against Racism during his term, the Durban Review Conference in 2009 and the Durban III Conference in 2011.

On 27 February 2009, the United States announced it would boycott the Durban Review Conference. The American delegation in attendance at the conference's preparatory talks concluded that "the anti-Israel and anti-Western tendencies were too deeply entrenched to excise." President Barack Obama said "I would love to be involved in a useful conference that addressed continuing issues of racism and discrimination around the globe," but stressed that the language of the U.N.'s draft declaration "raised a whole set of objectionable provisions" and risked a reprise Durban, "which became a session through which folks expressed antagonism toward Israel in ways that were oftentimes completely hypocritical and counterproductive." The United States had withdrawn from the 2001 Durban Conference, and did not attend the 1978 and 1985 World Conferences Against Racism.

On 1 June 2011, the Obama administration confirmed that it would boycott the Durban III conference held in New York City. Joseph E. Macmanus, acting U.S. assistant secretary of state for legislative affairs, answered Senator Gillibrand's 17 December 2010 letter, saying the US would not participate because the Durban process "included ugly displays of intolerance and anti-Semitism." Later that month, New Jersey Senator Frank Lautenberg applauded the decision of the administration.

== See also ==
- List of international presidential trips made by Barack Obama
- List of international trips made by Hillary Clinton as United States Secretary of State
- List of international trips made by John Kerry as United States Secretary of State
- Yemen model
- Hillary Clinton as Secretary of State
- International relations since 1989
