= WCAR =

WCAR may refer to:

- World Conference against Racism - International events organized by the UN to combat racism
  - World Conference against Racism 2001 - The 2001 WCAR in Durban South Africa
- Durban Review Conference - The 2009 Durban Review Conference (WCAR 2009)
- We Came as Romans, an American metalcore band from Troy, Michigan
- WCAR (AM), an American AM radio station licensed to Livonia, Michigan
- WDFN, an American AM radio station in the Detroit, Michigan, market that used the WCAR call letters (1939-1979)
