= Manute Bol =

Sudanese-American basketball player (died 2010)

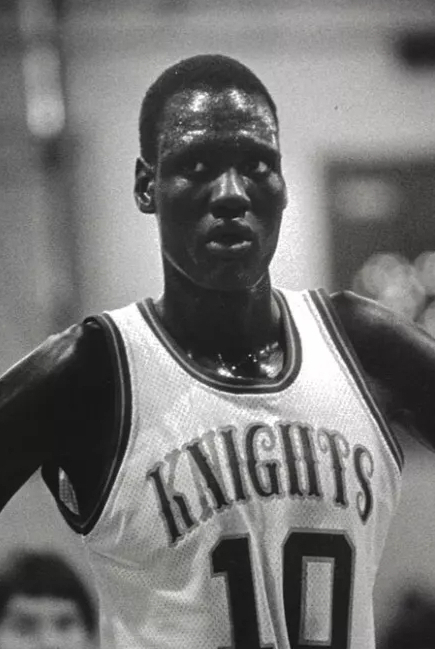
- Bol in 1984

Personal information
- Born: c. 1946–1962 Turalei, Sudan (present-day South Sudan)
- Died: June 19, 2010 (aged between 48 and 64) Charlottesville, Virginia, U.S.
- Listed height: 7 ft 7 in (2.31 m) (Note: Official NBA sources variously list Bol at 7 ft 6 in (2.29 m) or 7 ft 7 in (2.31 m).)
- Listed weight: 200 lb (91 kg)

Career information
- College: Bridgeport (1984–1985)
- NBA draft: 1985: 2nd round, 31st overall pick
- Drafted by: Washington Bullets
- Playing career: 1985–1997
- Position: Center
- Number: 10, 11, 4, 1

Career history
- 1985: Rhode Island Gulls
- 1985–1988: Washington Bullets
- 1988–1990: Golden State Warriors
- 1990–1993: Philadelphia 76ers
- 1993–1994: Miami Heat
- 1994: Washington Bullets
- 1994: Philadelphia 76ers
- 1994–1995: Golden State Warriors
- 1995–1996: Florida Beach Dogs
- 1996–1997: Fulgor Libertas Forlì

Career highlights
- NBA All-Defensive Second Team (1986); 2× NBA blocks leader (1986, 1989)

Career NBA statistics
- Points: 1,599 (2.6 ppg)
- Rebounds: 2,647 (4.2 rpg)
- Blocks: 2,086 (3.3 bpg)
- Stats at NBA.com
- Stats at Basketball Reference

Manute Bol (/məˈnuːt ˈboʊl/ mə-NOOT BOHL; died June 19, 2010) was a South Sudanese-American professional basketball player and political activist. Listed at 7 ft 6 in (2.29 m) or 7 ft 7 in (2.31 m) tall, Bol was one of the two tallest players in the history of the National Basketball Association (NBA).

After he played college basketball for the Bridgeport Purple Knights, Bol was selected by the Washington Bullets in the 1985 NBA draft. Bol played for the Bullets and three other teams over the course of his NBA career, which lasted from 1985 to 1995. A center, Bol is considered among the best shot-blockers in the history of the sport and is the only NBA player to retire with more career blocked shots than points scored. As of March 2026, he ranked second in NBA history in blocked shots per game and 17th in total blocked shots.

Bol was notable for his efforts to promote human rights in his native Sudan and aid for Sudanese refugees.

== Early life ==
Manute Bol was born to Madut and Okwok Bol in Turalei, a small village in what was at the time Sudan, now part of South Sudan. His father was a tribal elder for the Dinka people. Before his birth, Okwok had twice given birth to stillborn twins, and upon a visit to the local mystic, was promised a healthy boy who was to be named Manute. In the Dinka language, Manute means "special blessing". Bol's exact birth year is unknown; the birth date listed in his United States immigration forms is October 16, 1962, but Cleveland State basketball head coach Kevin Mackey admitted that it was fabricated and that he chose this date to make him attractive to teams. Mackey said, "I wanted to make sure he was young enough because he didn't have an age. I think he was [in his 40s], I really do. But there's no way of ever really knowing." Former teammate Jayson Williams believes Bol may have been as old as 55 before he retired in 1995, potentially placing his year of birth as early as 1940.

Bol grew up during a period of relative peace in Sudan, a country that had recently experienced a lengthy civil war. This allowed him to avoid military service and experience a normal life. At the time, the Dinka people did not encourage formal education, and Bol instead helped raise livestock. An often repeated story about Bol's life in Sudan was that he killed a lion with a spear, although former teammate Charles Barkley has questioned the validity of the story. As Bol grew older, he was expected to participate in a ritual in which young boys would have some of their teeth removed with a chisel and have incisions cut into their forehead, which would signal one's ascension to manhood. Bol did not want to partake in the ritual and instead wanted an education, and on two separate instances ran away from home. In the second instance, he lived in Babanusa for about a year but struggled in school since he barely understood Arabic. Once he returned to Turalei, he participated in the ritual.

Bol came from a family of extraordinarily tall men and women. His mother was 6 ft 10 in (2.08 m), his father was 6 ft 8 in (2.03 m), his sister was 6 ft 8 in (2.03 m), and his great-grandfather was 7 ft 10 in (2.39 m). The Dinka belong to a larger ethnic group known as the Nilotes, which are among the tallest populations in the world. Bol recalled, "I was born in a village where you cannot measure yourself". By his late teens, Bol was 7 ft 7 in (2.31 m). Unlike most people of extreme height, Bol did not suffer from a growth-related pathological disorder such as gigantism. In 1979, a photographer for a newspaper in Khartoum took a photo of Bol. The image was widely circulated, and the police chief in Wau invited him to play for the police basketball team. Bol initially declined as he did not understand the appeal of the game, but was eventually convinced by one of his cousins. When Bol tried to dunk for the first time, he knocked out two of his upper teeth on the rim, and resolved to practice more so as to avoid another injury.

After a few games in Wau, Bol was recruited to play for a Catholic team in Khartoum. His coach instructed him to focus on blocking and rebounding, and whenever he was not on the court, he was to watch how the taller players would position themselves underneath the basket for layups and dunks. Bol's height made him near impossible to guard, and it helped the Catholic team become one of the best teams in the league. Bol also joined the Sudan men's national basketball team, and played games in various African and European countries. A requirement to play for the national team was to enlist in the military, and Bol was listed as a paratrooper, but never saw any service time. Around this period, Bol watched footage of National Basketball Association (NBA) games, and dreamed of playing in the United States. When the national team was scheduled to play a game in Fort Bragg, North Carolina, Bol was not included on the roster, and concluded that the team was worried he would defect to the United States.

=== Move to the United States ===
Coach Don Feeley, formerly the basketball coach at Fairleigh Dickinson University in New Jersey, traveled to Sudan to coach and held clinics for the Sudanese national team in 1982. Feeley convinced Bol to go to the United States and play basketball.

With Feeley's input, Bol first landed in Cleveland. According to Cleveland State University basketball coach Kevin Mackey, Bol could not provide a record of his birth date. Mackey listed it as October 16, 1962, on Cleveland State documents, making Bol 19 years old, but he believed Bol was actually much older, possibly as old as 35. Bol did not speak or write English at the time of his arrival in Cleveland. He improved his English skills after months of classes at ESL Language Centers at Case Western Reserve University, but not enough to qualify for enrollment at Cleveland State. Bol never played a game for Cleveland State. Five years later, Cleveland State was placed on two years' probation for providing improper financial assistance to Bol and two other African players.

Again with Feeley's influence, Bol declared his intention to play professionally in the National Basketball Association (NBA). The San Diego Clippers drafted him in the 1983 NBA draft as the 97th overall pick. Clippers head coach Jim Lynam received a call about Bol from Feeley, whom he knew from coaching circles. "So, I said, 'Have you told anyone else about this?'" Lynam recalled. "Feeley said the only one in the NBA he had called was Frank Layden at Utah. He said Frank said he couldn't take another big guy like this. He already had Mark Eaton. I was the second guy Feeley had called. I told him he didn't have to call anyone else."

After the June 1983 draft, Lynam traveled to Cleveland and watched Bol play pickup games. In speaking with Bol, through a fellow Sudanese player, Lynam learned that he had become hesitant about playing professionally because he did not know the language well enough to understand coaches. Lynam said, "One of the things everyone was looking at was his passport. His passport said he was 19 years old. His passport also said he was five feet two." When Lynam asked Bol about the discrepancy between his real height and his passport height, Bol said he had been sitting down when measured by Sudan officials.

Language and passport concerns were set aside when the NBA ruled that Bol had not been eligible for the draft as he had not declared 45 days before the draft as required and declared the pick invalid.

== College basketball career ==
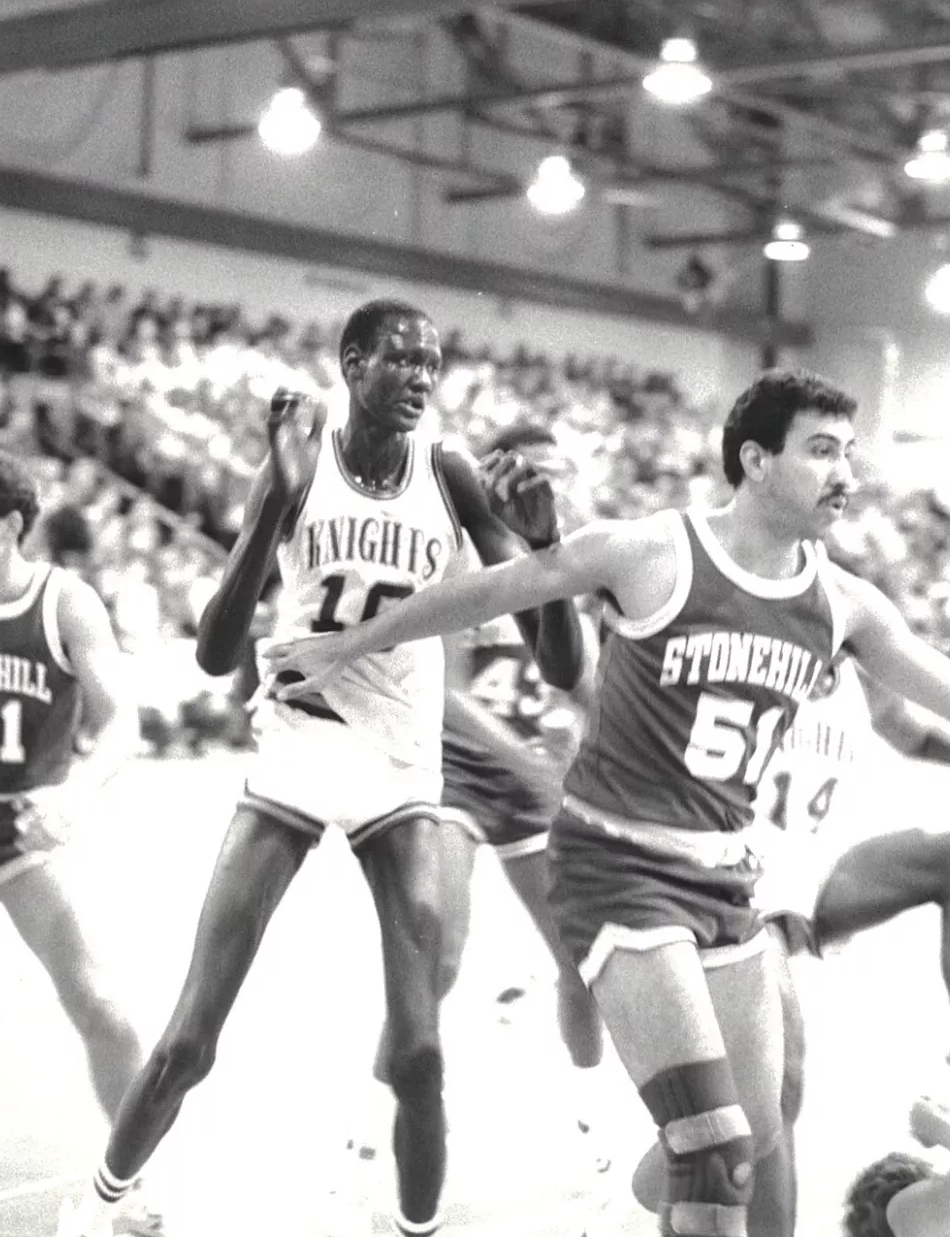
Bol (left) playing for Bridgeport Purple Knights in 1984

With the National Collegiate Athletic Association (NCAA) questioning his eligibility for NCAA Division I basketball, Bol enrolled at the University of Bridgeport, an NCAA Division II school with an English program for foreign students. He played for the Purple Knights in the 1984–85 season. His coach was Bruce Webster, a friend of Feeley. Bol averaged 22.5 points, 13.5 rebounds, and 7.1 blocks per game for the Purple Knights. The team, which previously drew 500–600 spectators, routinely sold out the 1,800-seat gym. With Bol, Bridgeport qualified for the 1985 NCAA Division II men's basketball tournament.

== Professional basketball career ==
Bol turned professional in May 1985, signing with the Rhode Island Gulls of the spring United States Basketball League. Going into the 1985 NBA draft, scouts believed that Bol needed another year or two of college; however, Bol opted for the draft because he felt it was the only way to earn enough money to get his sister out of Sudan, which was in a state of political unrest at the time.

=== Washington Bullets (1985–1988) ===
The Washington Bullets drafted Bol in the second round with the 31st overall selection.

When he arrived in the United States, Bol weighed 180 pounds (82 kg) and had gained just under 20 pounds (9.1 kg) by the time he entered the NBA. The Bullets sent Bol to strength training with University of Maryland coach Frank Costello, where he could initially lift only 44 pounds (20 kg) on 10-repetition bench press and 55 pounds (25 kg) on 10-repetition squat (his body mass index was 15.3 and he initially had a 31" (80 cm) waist).

Bol's first tenure with the Bullets lasted three seasons, from 1985 to 1988. In his rookie season (1985–1986), he appeared in 80 games and recorded a career-high 5.0 blocks per game. That year, during his first career start on December 12, Bol set a Washington franchise record with 12 blocks and scored a career high 18 points in a 110–108 overtime victory against the Milwaukee Bucks. His total of 397 blocks set the NBA rookie record and remains the second-highest single-season total in league history, behind Mark Eaton's 456 in 1984–85. Bol led the league with 5.0 blocks per game during the 1985–86 season.

Bol was named to the NBA All-Defensive Second Team in 1986.

In 1987, the Bullets drafted the 5 ft 3 in (1.60 m) point guard Muggsy Bogues, pairing the tallest and shortest players in the league on the court for one season.

Bol competed in the NBA playoffs with the Bullets in 1986, 1987, and 1988.

=== Golden State Warriors (1988–1990) ===
On June 8, 1988, the Bullets traded Bol to the Golden State Warriors for Dave Feitl and a 1989 second round draft pick (Doug Roth was later selected).

Bol's first tenure with the Warriors lasted two seasons, from 1988 to 1990. In his first season with Golden State, he attempted three-point shots with regularity. In that season he attempted a career-high 91 three-pointers and made 20 of them. During this time, he may have helped to popularize the expression "my bad", although a 2005 suggestion that he coined the phrase has been discounted.

Bol led the league with 4.3 blocks per game for the 1988–89 season.

=== Philadelphia 76ers (1990–1993) ===
On August 1, 1990, Golden State traded Bol to the Philadelphia 76ers for a 1991 first round draft pick (Chris Gatling was later selected).

Bol's first tenure with the Philadelphia 76ers lasted three seasons, from 1990 to 1993. After playing in all 82 games in 1990–91, he played in 71 games the next season and in 58 games the following season. During his last season in Philadelphia, he had a memorable night playing against former teammate Charles Barkley and the Phoenix Suns, making 6 of 12 three-pointers in the second half in a losing effort. Fans were known to yell "shoot" as soon as Bol received the ball far from the basket.

=== Later career (1993–1997) ===
After being released by Philadelphia in July 1993, Bol played in eight games in the 1993–94 season with the Miami Heat. He scored only one two-point field goal with the team and blocked six shots in 61 total minutes.

After being released by Miami on January 25, 1994, Bol played two games for the Washington Bullets in 1994 and then returned to Philadelphia, where he played four games.

In October 1994, Bol returned to the Warriors. He played his last five NBA games there. On November 15, 1994, Bol came off of the bench to play 29 minutes against the Minnesota Timberwolves. He attempted three three-pointers in the fourth quarter and made them all. Seven nights later in Charlotte, in a game nationally televised by TNT, he was in the starting lineup again. By this time, two weeks into the season, his career seemed rejuvenated under Warrior head coach Don Nelson; he was again a defensive force, making threes and contributing as a starter to create matchup problems. After playing only ten minutes against the Hornets on November 22, 1994, he suffered a season-ending knee injury. Before he left the game, he recorded one block and two points and attempted a three-pointer in ten minutes of play. Bol was waived by Golden State on February 15, 1995.

Bol played 22 games for the Florida Beach Dogs of the Continental Basketball Association during the 1995–96 season under Coach Eric Musselman. The Beach Dogs' games against the Sioux Falls Skyforce that season were broadcast by ESPN, as the Skyforce also featured a former NBA player, Darryl Dawkins.

In 1996, the Portland Mountain Cats of the United States Basketball League announced that Bol would be playing with the team, but he never appeared in uniform.

Bol played professionally in Italy in 1997 and in Qatar in 1998 before rheumatism forced him to retire permanently.

== Player profile and accomplishments ==
Bol and Gheorghe Mureșan are the two tallest players in the history of the NBA. Official NBA publications have listed Bol at either 7 ft 6 in (2.29 m) or 7 ft 7 in (2.31 m) tall. He was measured by the Guinness Book of World Records at 7 ft 6 3/4 in tall. Complementing his great height, Bol had exceptionally long limbs (inseam 49 inches (120 cm)) and large hands and feet (size 16 1/2). His arm span, at 8 feet 6 inches (2.59 m), is (as of 2023) the longest in NBA history, and his upward reach was 10 feet 5 inches (3.18 m).

With his great height and very long limbs, Bol was one of the NBA's most imposing defensive presences. Along with setting the rookie shot-blocking record in 1985–86, Bol later tied the NBA record for most blocked shots in one half (11) and in one quarter (eight, twice). On January 31, 1992, in a game against the Orlando Magic, he blocked four consecutive shots in a single possession. On average, he blocked one shot per every 5.6 minutes of playing time. Bol's other basketball skills, however, were very limited. His rail-thin physique made it difficult for him to establish position against the league's bulkier centers and power forwards, and he also suffered from a claw hand on his right hand (his natural hand), which severely affected his shooting and ball-handling abilities. To compensate for this inherited deformity on his right hand, Bol learned to dribble, block shots and rebound with his (non-dominant) left hand.

Off the court, Bol established a reputation as a practical joker; Charles Barkley, a frequent victim of his pranks, has attested to Bol's sense of humor.

In his NBA career, Bol averaged 2.6 points, 4.2 rebounds, 0.3 assists, and 3.3 blocks per game, playing an average of 18.7 minutes. He finished his career with 1,599 points, 2,647 rebounds, and 2,086 blocks. He appeared in 624 games over 10 seasons. As of 2019, Bol had the second-highest career blocks-per-game average (3.3) in the history of the NBA and was the only player in NBA history to have more blocked shots than points scored.

== Humanitarian efforts and activism ==
Bol was active in charitable causes during and after his basketball career. He claimed he spent much of the money he made during his NBA career supporting various causes relating to Sudan and its civil war.

Bol frequently visited Sudanese refugee camps, where he was greeted enthusiastically by its inhabitants. In 2001 the Sudanese government offered him the post of minister of sport. Bol, a Christian, refused because one of the conditions was converting to Islam.

Later, the Sudanese government hindered Bol from leaving the country, accusing him of supporting the Dinka-led Christian rebels, the Sudan People's Liberation Army. It refused to grant him an exit visa unless he came back with more money. Assistance from supporters in the United States, including Senator Joe Lieberman, raised money to provide Bol with plane tickets to Cairo, Egypt. After six months of negotiations with U.S. consulate officials regarding refugee status, Bol and his family were finally able to leave Egypt and return to the United States. He was admitted to the United States as a religious refugee in 2002 and settled in West Hartford, Connecticut.

Bol established the Ring True Foundation to continue fund-raising for Sudanese refugees. He gave most of his earnings (an estimated $3.5 million) to their cause. In 2002, Fox TV agreed to broadcast the foundation's phone number in exchange for Bol's agreement to appear on their Celebrity Boxing show. After the referee goaded, "If you guys don't box, you won't get paid", he scored a third-round victory over former football player William "The Refrigerator" Perry.

In late 2002, Bol signed a one-day contract with the Indianapolis Ice of the Central Hockey League. Though he could not skate, the publicity generated by his single-game appearance helped raise money to assist children in Sudan.

Bol was involved in the April 2006 Sudan Freedom Walk, a three-week march from the United Nations building in New York City to the United States Capitol in Washington, DC. The event was organized by Simon Deng, a former Sudanese swimming champion who was a longtime friend of Bol's. Deng, who was enslaved from age 9 to 12, is from another tribe in Southern Sudan. His Sudan Freedom Walk focused on finding a solution to the genocide in Darfur (western Sudan) but also sought to raise awareness of the modern-day slavery and human-rights abuses throughout Sudan. Bol spoke in New York City at the start of the walk, and in Philadelphia at a rally organized by former hunger striker Nathan Kleinman.

Bol was also an advocate for reconciliation efforts, and worked to improve education in South Sudan. A Nicholas Kristof article in The New York Times highlighted Bol's work for reconciliation and education with an organization called Sudan Sunrise. Bol first began working with Sudan Sunrise to raise awareness on issues of reconciliation in 2005. This included speaking at the United States Capitol and subsequently partnering with Sudan Sunrise to build schools across South Sudan that, in the spirit of reconciliation, would enroll students regardless of tribe or religion.

== Personal life ==
Bol had six children with his first wife, Atong, and four with his second wife, Ajok. Bol's son Madut (born December 19, 1989) played college basketball at Southern University and graduated in 2013. Another son, Bol Bol (born November 16, 1999), is a professional basketball player who previously played in the NBA. Bol was Catholic.

Bol spoke Dinka and Arabic before learning English.

In July 1988, Bol was arrested for driving while intoxicated and resisting arrest. On August 28, 1988, Bol was arrested in Maryland for driving while intoxicated.

Despite initially knowing little English or Western culture upon arriving in the United States, Bol adjusted and was widely regarded as well-rounded, inquisitive, and well-read. He developed a strong friendship with Charles Barkley, who remarked, "If everyone in the world was a Manute Bol, it's a world I'd want to live in. He's smart. He reads The New York Times. He knows what's going on in a lot of subjects. He's not one of these just-basketball guys".

During his time in Egypt, Bol ran a basketball school in Cairo. One of his pupils was a fellow Sudanese refugee, future NBA player Luol Deng, the son of a former Sudanese cabinet minister. Deng later moved to the United States to further his basketball career, maintaining a close relationship with Bol.

On February 11, 2004, Bol was arrested in West Hartford, Connecticut for assault, disorderly conduct, and interfering with a police officer. Police alleged that Bol had struck his daughter and injured her lip. According to the Hartford Courant, Bol was intoxicated and also attempted to harm himself. He received medical treatment for his injuries following the incident.

In July 2004, Bol was seriously injured in a car accident in Colchester, Connecticut; he was ejected from a taxi that hit a guardrail and overturned, resulting in a broken neck. The driver, who died following the accident, was driving with a suspended license and was intoxicated. Because his fortunes were mostly donated to Sudan and he had no health insurance, Bol was financially ruined by the accident. Bol was hospitalized for three months following the accident. When he recovered from his injuries, he moved to Olathe, Kansas.

On February 26, 2006, Bol and his wife Ajok were both arrested in West Harford, Connecticut following a physical altercation at their home.

== Death ==
On June 19, 2010, Bol died from acute kidney failure and complications from Stevens–Johnson syndrome at the University of Virginia Medical Center in Charlottesville, Virginia. He is buried in South Sudan.

=== Funeral service and tributes ===
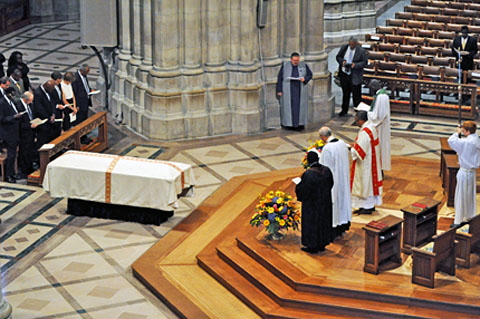
Bol's memorial service at the Washington National Cathedral

Bol's memorial service was held on June 29, 2010, at the Washington National Cathedral in Washington, DC. His body lay in an eight-foot-long, specially-built casket. At the funeral, U.S. Senator Sam Brownback said, "I can't think of a person that I know of in the world [who] used [his] celebrity status for a greater good than what Manute Bol did. He did it for his people. He gave his life for his people." NBA Development Vice President Rory Sparrow added, "'He had a heart that was very large and full of compassion for his fellow man'".

After his death, tributes to Bol's career and charitable works came from around the United States and the world. His former teams, and the NBA, issued statements in recognition of his impact on the sport of basketball and on Sudan. Brownback paid tribute to Bol on the floor of the United States Senate.

== Honors ==
- Bol was inducted into the University of Bridgeport Athletics Hall of Fame, Class of 2010.
- On January 27, 2015, the Golden State Warriors honored Bol with a Manute Bol bobblehead giveaway. The team sponsored a giveaway of 10,000 of the tallest bobbleheads in franchise history, at 10 inches (25 cm).
- The "Manute Bol Court" was built and constructed in South Sudan by the Luol Deng Foundation in 2015.
- The Manute Bol Peace Builders Basketball Tournament is held annually throughout Sudan.
- In 2016, Bol was inducted into the Fairfield County Sports Hall of Fame.

== Career statistics ==
Legend
GP	Games played	GS	Games started	MPG	Minutes per game
FG%	Field goal percentage	3P%	3-point field goal percentage	FT%	Free throw percentage
RPG	Rebounds per game	APG	Assists per game	SPG	Steals per game
BPG	Blocks per game	PPG	Points per game	**Bold**	Career high
*	Led the league

=== NBA ===
==== Regular season ====
Year	Team	GP	GS	MPG	FG%	3P%	FT%	RPG	APG	SPG	BPG	PPG
1985–86	Washington	80	**60**	**26.1**	.460	.000	.488	**6.0**	0.3	0.4	**5.0***	3.7
1986–87	Washington	**82**	12	18.9	.446	.000	**.672**	4.4	0.1	0.2	3.7	3.1
1987–88	Washington	77	4	14.8	.455	.000	.531	3.6	0.2	0.1	2.7	2.3
1988–89	Golden State	80	4	22.1	.369	.220	.606	5.8	0.3	0.1	4.3*	**3.9**
1989–90	Golden State	75	20	17.5	.331	.188	.510	3.7	**0.5**	0.2	3.2	1.9
1990–91	Philadelphia	**82**	6	18.6	.396	.071	.585	4.3	0.2	0.2	3.0	1.9
1991–92	Philadelphia	71	2	17.8	.383	.000	.462	3.1	0.3	0.2	2.9	1.5
1992–93	Philadelphia	58	23	14.7	.409	.313	.632	3.3	0.3	0.2	2.1	2.2
1993–94	Miami	8	0	7.6	.083	.000	–	1.4	0.0	0.0	0.8	0.3
1993–94	Philadelphia	4	0	12.3	.429	–	–	1.5	0.0	**0.5**	2.3	1.5
1993–94	Washington	2	0	3.0	.000	–	–	0.5	0.0	0.5	0.5	0.0
1994–95	Golden State	5	2	16.2	**.600**	**.600**	–	2.4	0.0	0.0	1.8	3.0
Career		624	133	18.7	.407	.210	.561	4.2	0.3	0.2	3.3	2.6

==== Playoffs ====
Year	Team	GP	GS	MPG	FG%	3P%	FT%	RPG	APG	SPG	BPG	PPG
1986	Washington	5	**5**	**30.4**	**.588**	–	.375	**7.6**	**0.2**	**0.6**	**5.8**	**4.6**
1987	Washington	3	0	14.3	.400	.000	.000	3.0	0.0	0.0	1.6	2.6
1988	Washington	5	0	8.8	.571	–	**1.000**	2.4	0.0	0.0	0.4	1.8
1989	Golden State	**8**	0	18.5	.194	**.091**	.286	3.8	0.1	0.2	3.6	2.2
1991	Philadelphia	**8**	0	13.6	.500	–	.667	2.3	0.1	0.1	1.5	3.0
Career		29	5	17.1	.386	.087	.444	3.8	0.1	0.2	2.7	2.8

=== College ===
Year	Team	GP	FG%	FT%	RPG	APG	SPG	BPG	PPG
1984–85	Bridgeport	31	.611	.595	13.5	1.4	.3	7.1	22.5

== See also ==
- List of NBA annual blocks leaders
- List of NBA single-game blocks leaders
- List of NBA single-season blocks per game leaders
- List of tallest players in NBA history
- List of tallest people
