= Durban III =

2011 United Nations General Assembly meeting

Durban III is an informal name for a high-level United Nations General Assembly meeting marking the 10th anniversary of the adoption of The Durban Declaration and Programme of Action that was held in New York City on 22 September 2011. It was mandated by United Nations General Assembly (UNGA) resolution 64/148 of 18 December 2009 to commemorate the World Conference against Racism 2001 (also known as Durban I), and given additional form and visibility by a UNGA Third Committee draft resolution adopted on 24 November 2010. It followed the Durban Review Conference, the official name of the 2009 United Nations World Conference Against Racism (WCAR), also known as Durban II.

The previous Durban conferences had been criticized by Western governments for allegedly promoting rather than combating racism. Fourteen countries boycotted Durban III. They charged that the Durban process has been used to promote racism, intolerance, antisemitism and Holocaust denial, and to erode freedom of speech and Israel's right to exist. The same countries, excluding Austria, Bulgaria, France and the United Kingdom, had also previously boycotted the Durban Review Conference in 2009.

A coalition of 25 non-governmental organizations (NGOs) critical of the conference, led by UN Watch, organized a parallel human rights summit with the stated aim of drawing attention to flaws in the UN system and promoting reform. A similar counter-conference organized by Nobel Peace Prize laureate Elie Wiesel and human rights scholar Anne Bayefsky featured scholars and public figures. Conversely, the Durban +10 Coalition, a group of NGOs which included the US Human Rights Network, National Lawyers Guild and the International Jewish Anti-Zionist Network, expressed its unequivocal support for the DDPA and criticized countries boycotting the conference.

== Program ==
Durban III was a one-day conference that took place in New York City on 22 September 2011. Its theme was "victims of racism, racial discrimination, xenophobia and related intolerance: recognition, justice and development." Its stated goal was to build upon the agenda outlined in The Durban Declaration and Programme of Action, or DDPA, described by the UN as "the international community's blueprint for action to fight racism." It consisted of a plenary session and a series of round table discussions at the level of heads of state and government.

The conference was attended by delegations from 179 countries, while 14 countries boycotted the conference. The conference was addressed by Ban Ki-Moon and others, including Iranian President Mahmoud Ahmadinejad and Simon Aban Deng, a former slave and Sudanese human rights activist living in the United States.

== Countries boycotting ==
Durban III was boycotted by 14 countries: Australia, Austria, Bulgaria, Canada, the Czech Republic, France, Germany Italy, Israel, the Netherlands, New Zealand, Poland, the United Kingdom and the United States.

The precise reasons varied from country to country, but included concerns that the Durban process has been used to promote racism, intolerance, antisemitism and Holocaust denial, and to erode freedom of speech and Israel's right to exist.

The countries are listed below in chronological order of their boycott declaration.

=== Canada ===
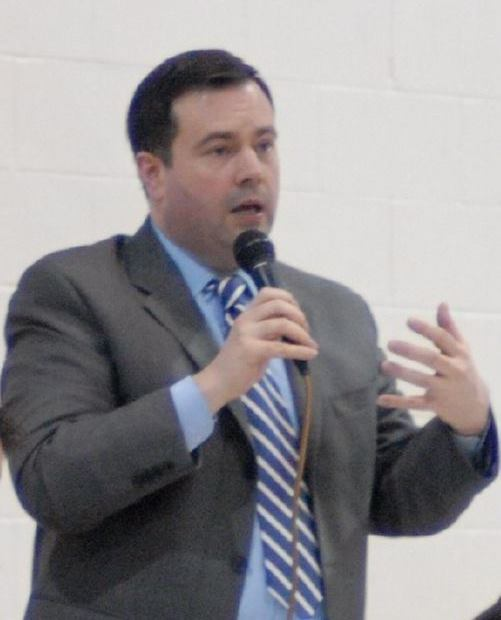
Jason Kenney, Canadian Minister of Citizenship and Immigration

On 25 November 2010, shortly after the conference was declared, Canada announced that it would not be attending and that the country had lost faith in the United Nations' human rights process. Immigration Minister Jason Kenney said: "The original Durban Conference, and its declaration, as well as the non-governmental activities associated with it, proved to be a dangerous platform for racism, including antisemitism," also stating that "Canada is clearly committed to the fight against racism, but the Durban process commemorates an agenda that actually promotes racism rather than combats it," and "Canada will not participate in this charade. We will not lend our good name to this Durban hatefest."

The boycott declaration was supported by the opposition. On 13 June 2011, Canada boycotted a General Assembly resolution setting out details for the conference.

Canada had also been the first country to announce that it would boycott the Durban II conference, over similar concerns. At the time, it was followed by nine other western countries. Kenney said that his country's decision to boycott the earlier event was vindicated when Iranian President Mahmoud Ahmadinejad used it as a vehicle for Holocaust denial, racism, xenophobia and the promotion of hatred, saying: "Despite the fact that the Durban declaration and its follow-up have served, frankly, to fuel bigotry, the General Assembly has chosen to repeat and even augment the mistakes of the past." Members of the Canadian delegation to the original Durban Conference stayed to the end but said they did so only to decry the attempts to de-legitimize Israel, and issued a statement dissociating Canada from the final agreement.

=== Israel ===
On 25 December 2010, a day after the UN approved a resolution firmly linking the event to the 2001 Durban Conference, Israel's Foreign Ministry announced that the Jewish state intended to boycott the event. "The Durban Conference of 2001, with its anti-Semitic undertones and displays of hatred for Israel and the Jewish World, left us with scars that will not heal quickly. As long as the meeting is defined as part of the infamous 'Durban process', Israel will not participate", the statement said.

The Foreign Ministry also said that it expected the UN and its member states "to deal appropriately with the serious manifestations of racism throughout the world, and to reject attempts to once again divert world attention from this dangerous phenomenon by means of cheap politicization. Israel is part of the international struggle against racism. The Jewish people was itself a victim of racism throughout history. Israel regrets that a resolution on an important subject- elimination of racism- has been diverted and politicized by the automatic majority at the UN, by linking it to the Durban Declaration and Programme of Action (2001) that many states would prefer to forget."

=== United States ===
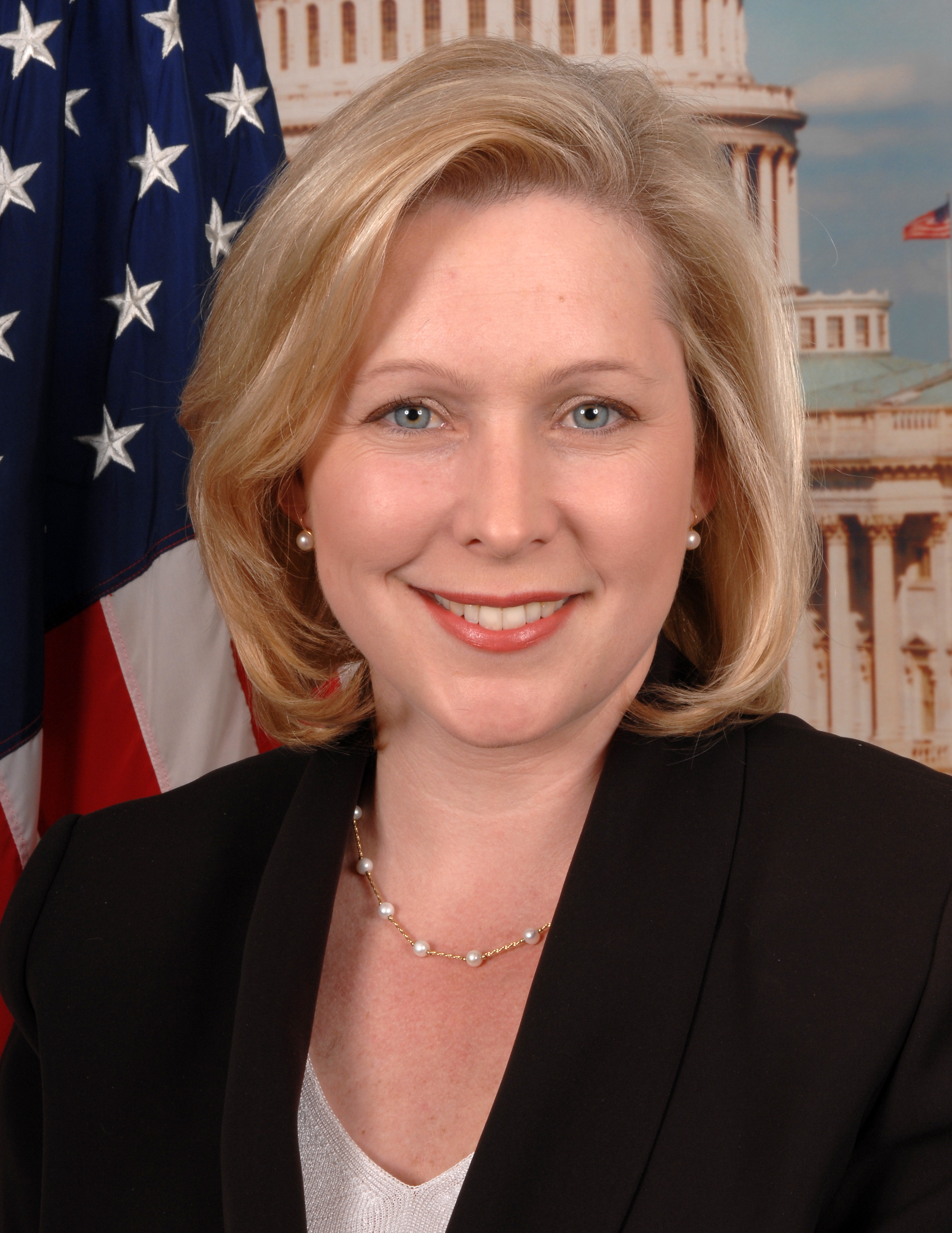
Senator Kirsten Gillibrand (D-NY)

Opposing the 24 November 2010 resolution, United States representative John Sammis stated to the UN committee that the event "risks undermining the relationship we have worked hard to strengthen over the past few years between the United States and the UN."

Senator Kirsten Gillibrand (D-NY) said: "We all witnessed how extreme antisemitic and anti-American voices took over Durban I and Durban II, and we should expect the same thing to happen with Durban III... I appreciate the Obama Administration’s strong statement opposing yesterday’s resolution, and urge it to again withdraw from the event and encourage other nations to do the same."

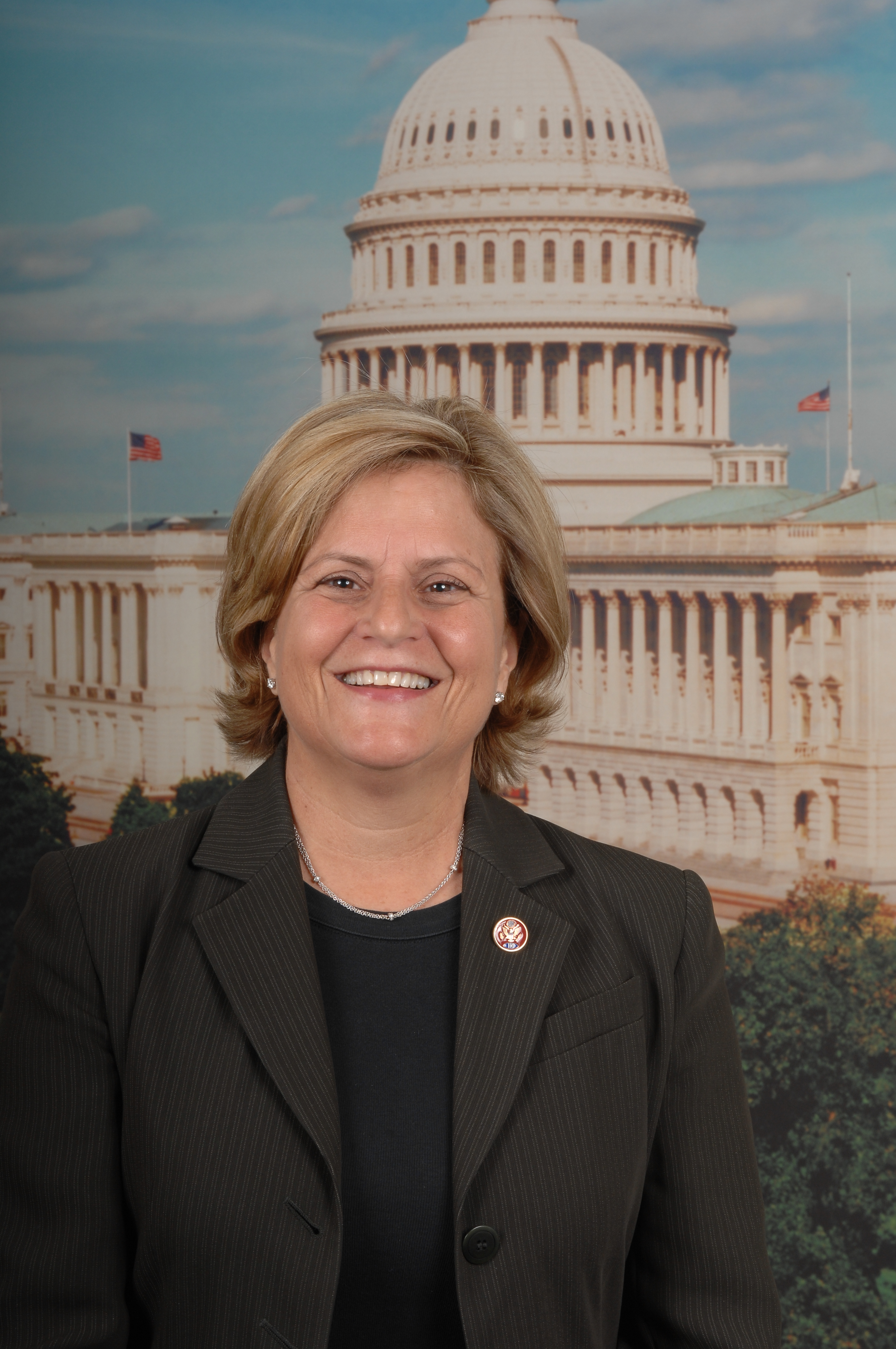
Representative Ileana Ros-Lehtinen (R-FL)

On 23 November 2010, Rep. Ileana Ros-Lehtinen, the Ranking Republican on the House Foreign Affairs Committee, called on the Obama administration to "announce publicly, right now, that we will stay away from Durban III, deny it US taxpayer dollars, and oppose all measures that seek to facilitate it. And we should encourage other responsible nations to do the same."

On 17 December 2010, Gillibrand led a group of 18 senators, consisting of 11 Democrats and 7 Republicans, who sent a letter to US Ambassador to the UN Susan Rice urging her to refrain from participating in the conference. The senators wrote: "It is important that the United States send a strong signal that another anti-Semitic and anti-American Durban Conference particularly held so close to the tenth anniversary and location of the worst terrorist attack in American history is unacceptable".

After the US opposed 24 December 2010 resolution, Rice issued a statement saying: "We voted 'no' because the Durban Declaration process has included ugly displays of intolerance and antisemitism, and we do not want to see that commemorated. The United States is fully committed to upholding the human rights of all individuals and to combating racial discrimination, intolerance and bigotry. We stand ready to work with all partners to uphold human rights and fight racism around the world."

On 1 June 2011, the Obama administration confirmed that it would boycott the conference. Joseph E. Macmanus, acting U.S. assistant secretary of state for legislative affairs, answered Senator Gillibrand's 17 December 2010 letter, saying the US would not participate because the Durban process "included ugly displays of intolerance and anti-Semitism." Later that month, New Jersey Senator Frank Lautenberg applauded the decision of the administration.

=== Other boycotting countries ===
Czech Republic: On 21 July, the country announced that it would boycott the summit as well as informal talks associated with it. The country said that the Durban process is often abused to make "unacceptable statements with anti-Jewish connotations", and that it includes tendencies conflicting with existing standards of human rights protection, particularly freedom of speech. The decision was welcomed by UN Watch.

Italy: On 22 July, the country announced a boycott. Foreign Minister Franco Frattini explained that the country had had reservations about the Durban process for some time. He noted the Durban II address by Iranian President Mahmoud Ahmadinejad which, he said, legitimized Holocaust denial. He also stated: "We feel that any axiomatic linkage between racism and Israel's defence of its right to exist as a state is unacceptable."

Netherlands: Also on 22 July, the country declared that it would shun the conference. The country was concerned about "attempts to connect the Durban declaration to issues that have nothing to do with fighting racism". In particular, it stated that countries had repeatedly used the Durban process "to draw attention to the peace process in the Middle East and denounce Israel's right to exist.

Australia: On 23 August, the country announced that it would not attend the Durban III event at the UN, saying that "it was not convinced that 'unbalanced criticism of Israel and the airing of anti-Semitic views' would be avoided." This was confirmed by spokesperson for Prime Minister Julia Gillard.

Austria: On 31 August, a spokesman for the Foreign Ministry stated Austria would "walk away" from Durban III. "We have no intention of participating in Durban III in September," he said, adding that Austria had "doubts about the content and direction of the conference".

Germany: The Foreign Ministry announced on 2 September that it would not take part in the conference because of the possibility that the event would be turned into a forum for antisemitic statements "as was the case in previous conferences" and that Germany's withdrawal "is also an expression of our special responsibility toward Israel."

Bulgaria: on 9 September, Foreign Minister Nikolai Mladenov said Bulgaria would not be attending the conference and that its decision "stems from concerns related to clear indications that the trend of unbalanced criticism and interpretations of the problems of racism will be, unfortunately, present again at the high-level meeting".

United Kingdom: Prime Minister David Cameron stated that the UK "will play no part in this conference" because the Durban process had in the past seen "open displays" of "deplorable anti-Semitism," adding that it would be "wrong" to engage in such events.

France: the French Foreign Ministry said that "France will not participate in the meeting planned in New York on the 22nd of September commemorating the 10th anniversary of the Durban conference against racism. We remember that the previous meeting [i.e., Durban II] led to an unacceptable diversion of the principles and values of the fight against racism. For this reason, as other partners of the European Union, France will not attend the commemoration."

New Zealand: on 16 September, Foreign Affairs Minister Murray McCully announced that his country would boycott the conference because it is plagued by anti-Semitism. McCully said: "We remain concerned that the commemoration of the 2001 Durban Declaration could re-open the offensive and anti-Semitic debates which undermined the original World Conference. For these reasons, we have decided not to participate."

Poland: A Polish Foreign Ministry official said that his country would not be attending the conference and that the decision had been complicated by the fact that Poland held the rotating Presidency of the European Union at the time.

== Counterpoint summits ==
=== We Have A Dream ===
Geneva-based NGO UN Watch, in partnership with a coalition of 25 non-governmental organizations, organized We Have A Dream: A Global Summit Against Discrimination and Persecution, an event scheduled to take place on 21–22 September 2011, next door to Durban III. The purpose of the event was to "oppose participation of repressive regimes like China, Iran and Saudi Arabia on UN bodies that regulate the rights of women and other basic freedoms" and to promote reform of UN human rights mechanisms. Participants included Mariane Pearl, widow of murdered journalist Daniel Pearl.

=== The Perils of Global Intolerance ===
The Perils of Global Intolerance: the United Nations and Durban III was a conference that took place on 22 September 2011 to counter Durban III. The event was organized by Nobel Peace Prize laureate and Holocaust survivor Elie Wiesel as well as Canadian human rights scholar Anne Bayefsky, and was sponsored by the Hudson Institute and Touro College. Bayefsky said that the original Durban Conference "legitimized hate speech on a global scale" and that the counter-summit would "serve as a call to action" and "deny legitimacy to prejudice and the Durban Declaration".

Speakers at the counter-conference, in addition to Wiesel and Bayefsky, included:

- Douglas Murray, best-selling British journalist
- Dore Gold, former Israeli Ambassador to the UN
- Ed Koch, former Mayor of New York City
- Alan Dershowitz, Harvard law professor and liberal activist
- Khaled Abu Toameh, award-winning Arab Israeli journalist
- John Bolton, former United States Ambassador to the UN
- Mike Huckabee, former Governor of Arkansas
- Bernard Lewis, a leading scholar on Islam and professor at Princeton University
- Jon Voight, academy-award-winning actor
- Wafa Sultan, psychiatrist included in Time magazine's named list of 100 most influential people in the world
- Simon Deng, Sudanese human rights activist
- Ron Lauder, president of the World Jewish Congress
- Dr. Zuhdi Jasser, president of the American Islamic Forum for Democracy
- Jason Kenney, Canadian Minister of Citizenship, Immigration and Multiculturalism

== Opposition demonstration ==
The Los Angeles-based pro-Israel organization StandWithUs held a three-ring circus demonstration in front of the UN headquarters on the day of the conference. Roz Rothstein, CEO of the group, said: "One good way to counter the Durban conference’s hypocritical travesty of human rights is with parody. Sometimes humor reveals the deepest truths. There is no possible rational response to the Durban conference’s perverse distortions. They are too divorced from any reality. In fact, they turn reality upside down. We plan to fight the UN ‘clowns’ with actual clowns that expose their hypocrisy and perversity."

== Other views ==
=== Support ===
The "Durban +10 coalition" said the United States, Canada, Israel and several members of the European Union have spearheaded a "slander and sabotage" campaign against the Durban process in an attempt "to suppress the rights and demands of the many groups protected by the DDPA, including migrants, indigenous peoples, African and African-descendant peoples, for restitution and reparations, and those of the Palestinian people for self-determination." It also criticized the U.N. Secretariat for scheduling a nuclear security summit on the same day as the conference.

=== Criticism ===
Human rights scholar Anne Bayefsky criticized the timing and location of the conference, in New York City several days after the tenth anniversary of the 9/11 attacks, as "pour[ing] salt in the wounds of still grieving Americans." Bayefsky noted that "crowds at Durban I held high their signs reading: 'For the liberation of Quds, machine-guns based upon faith and Islam must be used,' and 'The martyr's blood irrigates the tree of revolution in Palestine,'" stating that "the obvious connection between hate and terror, or incitement to violence and violence itself, is either irrelevant to the UN or part of the plan." Quds, Qodesh, means "holy", and is the Arabic name for Jerusalem.

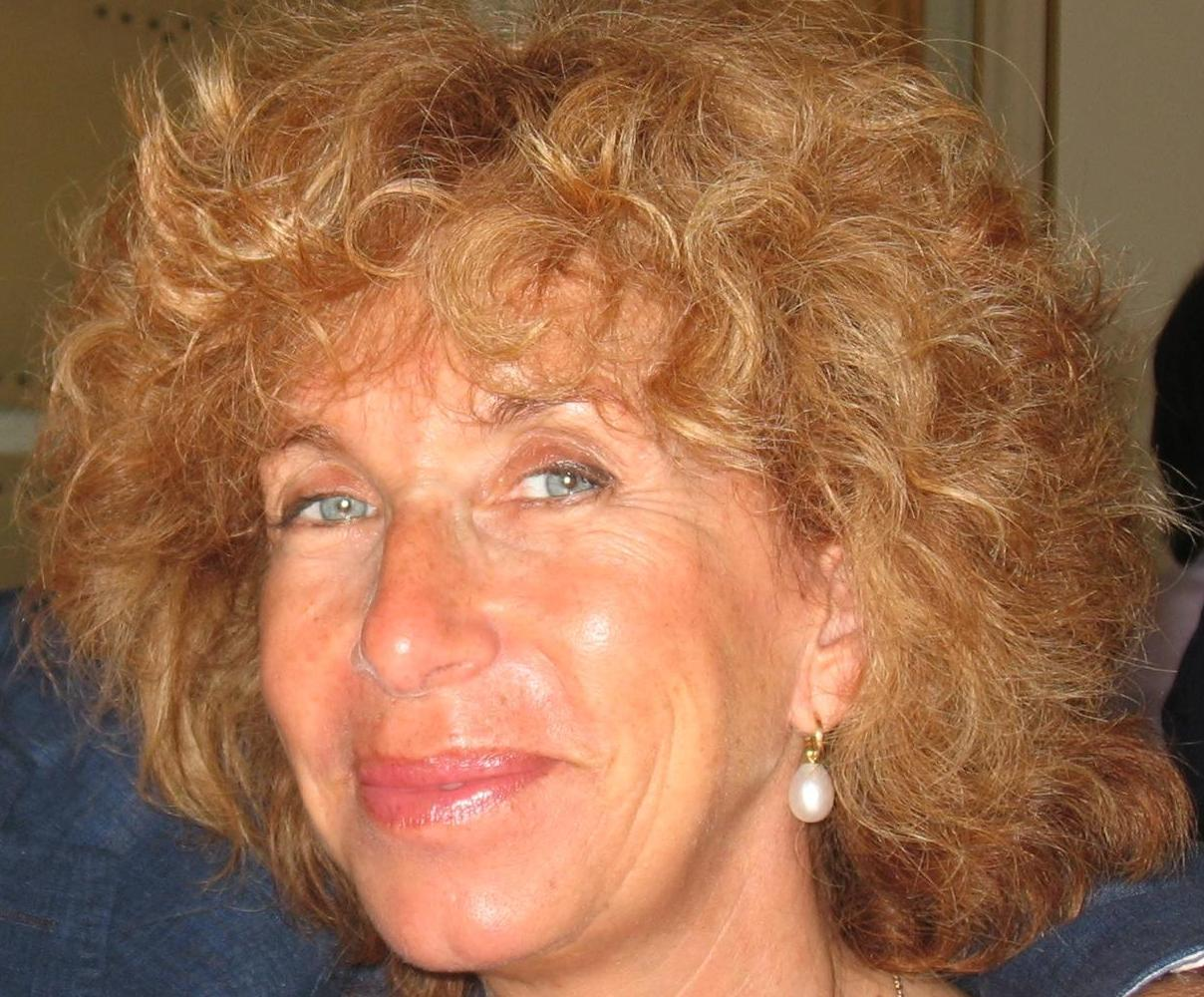
Fiamma Nirenstein

Italian Vice President of the Committee of Foreign Affairs Fiamma Nirenstein, who covered the original Durban Conference as a journalist, wrote that Durban III reconfirms the "extremely violent platform" of the earlier summit, in which "Jews wearing kippahs had to protect themselves against the demonstrators toting portraits of Bin Laden and hounding the Jews. The Jewish centers in the city were stormed and closed; and the press conference of the Israeli delegation was violently assaulted and interrupted." She stated that "re-approving the Durban document means... reviving manifestations of hate in which the swastika and the Star of David overlap and the hunting season on Jews is declared open, the result being an exponential growth in antisemitic incidents. This makes many people very happy."

In a 2002 op-ed, Rep. John Lewis stated that "During the recent U.N. Conference on Racism held in Durban, South Africa, we were all shocked by the attacks on Jews, Israel and Zionism. The United States of America stood up against these vicious attacks." In describing the special relationship between African Americans and American Jews in working for liberation and peace, he quoted Dr. Martin Luther King Jr. saying on March 25, 1968, "peace for Israel means security, and we must stand with all our might to protect its right to exist, its territorial integrity. I see Israel as one of the great outposts of democracy in the world, and a marvelous example of what can be done, how desert land can be transformed into an oasis of brotherhood and democracy. Peace for Israel means security and that security must be a reality."

The Jerusalem Post editorialized that the conference would further reduce the little respect and credibility the UN had left, saying that the summit "will undoubtedly become a clearinghouse for vitriolic anti-Semitism", and that "it would be downright evil to hold another hate fest against the West as Americans commemorate the loss of loved ones murdered by terrorists in the 9/11 attacks."

United Nations Watch stated that "the 2001 Durban conference and its progeny have become staging grounds for contemporary bigots and bullies – like the regimes of Sudan and Iran – to cover up their own racism and repression, and to scapegoat the US, the West, and Israel. Based on past experience, we fear that the banner of human rights and anti-racism will be hijacked by Iranian President Ahmadinejad and other dictators to deflect attention from their crimes, and to incite anti-Western and anti-Semitic hatred."

The Anti-Defamation League called on governments not to participate in the conference, saying that from its inception, "the Durban process was tainted by the very bias it purported to work against."

The American Jewish Committee expressed "profound regret" over the Durban commemoration, saying: "The global campaign against racism has been hijacked by countries that have little regard for human rights and whose primary goal is to advance highly political agendas".

B'nai B'rith stated that "the original Durban conference attempted to validate the perverse theory that Zionism is racism. Durban's legacy of hate, intolerance, and double standards should never be forgotten, and should certainly never be celebrated."

Gerald Steinberg, president of NGO Monitor, said, "If, as in 2001, the same NGOs are provided a platform in New York at 'Durban III', this will set the stage for another round of activities that exploit and undermine the moral and human rights agenda."

== See also ==
- Durban II
- United Nations Conference on Sustainable Development – June 2012
