= We Have A Dream: A Global Summit Against Discrimination and Persecution =

International summit organized by UN Watch

We Have A Dream: Global Summit Against Discrimination and Persecution was an international summit organized by the pro-Israel non-governmental organization UN Watch, in protest of the United Nations' conference (known as Durban III) marking a decade since the World Conference against Racism 2001. The 2001 conference was boycotted by the US, Israel, and 12 other countries due to a draft which described Israel as carrying out racist practices against Arabs.

The summit was attended by a selection of non-governmental organizations and speakers discussing issues of discrimination and persecution, particularly those of racism, sexism, homophobia, and discrimination against minorities. It occurred over two days, September 21 and 22 of 2011, across the street from the UN Conference.

UN Watch described the summit as being in protest of the UN's inclusion of particular countries that commit human rights abuses, especially in the Human Rights Council, named as China, Syria, Sudan, Zimbabwe, North Korea, and Iran. The conservative President of one of their partners at the summit, the Human Rights Foundation's Thor Halvorssen, referred to Durban III as representative of “despotic regimes which speak pretty words about human rights while they kill, torture, or jail their opponents”.

== Speakers ==
=== Burma ===
- Thaung Htun: Activist

=== Canada ===
- Irwin Cotler: Member of Canadian Parliament

=== China ===
- Geng He: Dissident, wife of human rights lawyer Gao Zhisheng
- Yang Jianli: Dissident

=== Cuba ===
- Fidel Suarez Cruz: Dissident
- Bertha Antunez: Women's rights activist

=== Darfur ===
- Adeeb Yousif: Activist

=== Democratic Republic of the Congo ===
- Judith Registre: Women for Women International

=== France ===
- Anna-Isabelle Tollet: Journalist and author
- Phillipe Robinet: Publisher, co-founder of Oh! Editions

=== Iran ===
- Banafsheh Zand-Bonazzi: Activist
- Marina Nemat: Author, Former prisoner
- Ahmad Batebi: Dissident

=== North Korea ===
- Ma Young Ae: Defector, former intelligence officer

=== Rwanda ===
- Bertha Kayitesi: Genocide survivor

=== South Sudan ===
- Luka Biong Deng: Director of KUSH, former minister
- John Dau: Genocide survivor, human rights activist

=== Syria ===
- Nasser Weddady: Civil Rights Outreach Director, AIC
- Rami Nakleh: Dissident

=== Tibet ===
- Ngawang Sandral: Activist

=== Uganda ===
- Jacqueline Kasha: LGBT activist

=== United States ===
- David Keyes: Co-founder of Cyber Dissidents
- Maran Turner: Director of Freedom Now
- Joel Brinkley: Journalist

=== Uyghur ===
- Rebiya Kadeer: Activist, former prisoner

=== Vietnam ===
- Thuy Tran: Activist and writer

=== Zimbabwe ===
- Grace Kwinje: Dissident and journalist
