= Sudan Sunrise =

Grassroots philanthropist organization

- Founded: December 2005; 20 years ago
- Founder: Tom Prichard
- Headquarters: 7677 River Rd Richmond, VA 23225-1074 USA
- Location: Richmond, Virginia, United States
- Dwight Arn, Esq, Board Chair: Tom Prichard, Executive Director
- Website: www.sudansunrise.org

Sudan Sunrise, Inc. is an American nonprofit 501(c)(3) organization based out of Fairfax, Virginia. According to their mission statement, Sudan Sunrise strives for grassroots reconciliation, education and community building in order to lift up examples of peace and forgiveness between former enemies as alternatives to the history of violence in Sudan and South Sudan. Sudan Sunrise also facilitates local efforts in Southern Sudan to provide education, health care and community development.

== History ==
Sudan Sunrise was officially founded in December 2005 by Tom Prichard. The organization emerged from an endeavor in 2004 to help Southern Sudanese Christians living in the U.S. deliver aid to Darfurian Muslim refugees in Chad.

In the wake of the emerging War in Darfur, South Sudanese immigrants in the United States responded to the needs of Darfurians, and organized an emergency effort to take a small shipment of medicine to refugee camps in Chad.

Darfurian soldiers were used by the government of Sudan against the Southern Sudanese in the 22-year civil war, making up one half or more of the army. Darfurian refugees in Chad were surprised by the Southern Sudanese efforts to bring them aid, and asked for Southerners to stand in solidarity with them so that peace might come to Darfur. A video appeal from Darfurians, asking Southerners for forgiveness and appealing to them to stand in solidarity with them was filmed by Sudan Sunrise and distributed widely across the US.

In 2006, Sudan Sunrise continued to work with the Sudanese diaspora community to rally support for Darfur in the spirit of reconciliation by sponsoring various events such as the "Standing Together Against Genocide" banquet in Washington, D.C., and related events in Denver, Des Moines, and Kansas City. In the same year, Sudan Sunrise began working on reconciliation in South Sudan by overseeing the construction of a community center serving local tribes.

Sudan Sunrise expanded operations the next year by sponsoring a delegation of Lost Boys of Sudan to travel to South Sudan and meet with Darfurian refugees. Later that year Sudan Sunrise returned to Chad to research the educational needs of refugees and to officially register with the Governments of Chad and Sudan. Continuing its efforts in 2007, Sudan Sunrise joined with the Sudanese diaspora community to organize several events including a rally empowering Sudanese women and a meeting in Washington of leaders within the Sudanese community. As a result, a similar meeting was held in Kansas City, which called for Sudanese of all tribes and religions to work together for peace, towards a democratic and just Sudan in a statement entitled "Call to Sudanese Solidarity".

In 2008, Sudan Sunrise partnered with Manute Bol to host a Sudan peace rally at the Iowa State House of Representatives just prior to the Iowa presidential caucuses. Other rally participants included former slave and activist Simon Deng, and human rights activist Nathan Kleinman. Later that year, Sudan Sunrise took a team of Darfurians with Francis Bok, author of Escape from Slavery, on his first return to his home village since his family was killed and he was abducted into slavery, and filmed Call to Sudanese Reconciliation, a grassroots plea for all Sudanese to stand together for peace. The film premiered at the South Sudan Women's Empowerment Network conference in Juba, South Sudan. Subsequently, a call to reconciliation was delivered on a prominent Southern Sudanese radio station.

In 2009, Sudan Sunrise began construction of the Manute Bol Primary School, and sponsored three U.S. teachers to travel to Turalei, South Sudan to teach English and basic math skills. That same year, Sudan Sunrise also partnered with PACT Sudan to drill water wells and provide clean water for the Francis Bok School in Gor Ayen, South Sudan. Later in 2009, Sudan Sunrise Project Director Daniel Kuot supported refugees returning to South Sudan by supplying fishing nets and assisting with the construction of 50 new homes and agricultural facilities in Palio, South Sudan.

Activities in 2010 involved the second phase of construction at the Manute Bol Primary School, including three classrooms, two sanitary facilities, and the capacity to harvest rainwater in Turalei, South Sudan.

In 2011, Sudan Sunrise partnered with the government of South Sudan to finance voter education, registration, poll observers, and voter transportation for Southern Sudanese living in the US to participate in the 2011 referendum on secession. In addition, Sudan Sunrise also received a strategic grant from the Open Society Institute to support a delegation led by former Rep. Tom Perriello (D-VA) and Sudan Sunrise Board members to participate in a dialogue to unify political leaders from Darfur. Other initiatives in 2011 included the completion of the Manute Bol Primary School in Turalei, South Sudan and fundraising event with NBA Cares, involving basketball players Dikembe Mutombo and Gheorge Muresan. Sudan Sunrise also partnered with the Youth Forum for Social Peace and the Girifna Movement to facilitate the delivery of food relief and a message of reconciliation from the Northern Sudanese to the people of Turalei, South Sudan.

In 2012, Sudan Sunrise partnered with Humanity United to facilitate a meeting in Washington, D.C., of the Jonglei Youth Peace Initiative. The meeting gathered representatives from eleven countries and five tribes from Jonglei State, South Sudan, to discuss a framework for peace for their respective communities.

In 2013, Sudan Sunrise helped coordinate the Manute Bol Tournament for peace which took place in June in Juba, South Sudan. Boys and girls from all the tribes in South Sudan put aside their differences to demonstrate peace through the playing of basketball. With the support of Sudan Sunrise, the Nuba Youth Committee organized Annual Nuba Day in Iowa. The event drew over 600 Nubans to discuss reconciliation and organizing relief efforts for those suffering bombardments in the Nuba Mountains.

In 2014, Sudan Sunrise, working with the Obakki Foundation, funded the repair of five non-functioning wells in an area in Lakes State where internally displaced persons (IDPs) were at risk of cholera from river water.

In 2015, Sudan Sunrise partnered with Bishop Abraham Nhial to seek funding for his reconciliation initiative in the Kakuma refugee camp. Darfur Interfaith Network of D.C. sponsors the first Walk to End Genocide in D.C., with Sudan Sunrise as the recipient of a special grant for a well and the Manute Bol School in Turalei. Sudan Sunrise, in partnership with St. John's Episcopal Church in Parchment, N.Y., hosted a special showing of The Good Lie with star Ger Duany for a benefit which raised over $26,000 for the Manute Bol School.

Ongoing projects of 2016 include reconciliation efforts in Torit, South Sudan, in which Muslim and Christian volunteers are seeking to help rebuild a twice-destroyed Catholic cathedral.

== Leadership ==
Sudan Sunrise's Board of Directors has nine members and includes its current chairman, Dwight Arn, Vice Chair, Richard Young, Treasurer, Ambassador William J. Hudson, Secretary, Heather Flor, executive director, Tom Prichard, Mary LeGrand Asel, Mike McGrath, Amanda Jane and Tom Yates.

Sudan Sunrise also has a Board of Advisors that has eight members, and includes the United States Institute of Peace (USIP) Sudan Program Director Jonathan Temin, the Founder and President of the Foundation for Relief and Reconciliation in the Middle East, Reverend Canon Andrew White, and abolitionist and author Francis Bok.

== See also ==
- Darfur
- Southern Sudan
- Slavery in Sudan
