= Don Feeley =

American basketball coach (1937–2020)

John Donald Feeley
Biographical details
- Born: October 30, 1937; Plainfield, New Jersey, U.S.
- Died: September 18, 2020 (aged 82); Southbury, Connecticut, U.S.
- Education: Bridgeport

Coaching career (HC unless noted)

Basketball
- 1965–1978: Sacred Heart
- 1978–1980: Yale (assistant)
- 1980–1983: Fairleigh Dickinson

Administrative career (AD unless noted)
- 1965–1978: Sacred Heart

Head coaching record
- Overall: 285–148

Accomplishments and honors

Championships
- ECAC regular season (1982)

John Donald Feeley (October 30, 1937 – September 18, 2020) was an American college men's basketball coach. He was the head coach at Sacred Heart University for 13 years and at Fairleigh Dickinson University for three. While at Sacred Heart, Feeley also served as the school's athletic director. Feeley compiled an overall coaching record of 285–148, including an Eastern Collegiate Athletic Conference regular season championship in 1981–82.

In the summer of 1983, Feeley discovered 7'6" Sudanese teenager (and future NBA player) Manute Bol while he was playing for the Sudanese national team. Shortly before his discovery, Feeley had been let go by Fairleigh Dickinson due to 'imcompatible' philosophies with the school. Feeley tried using his connections with Cleveland State University to get himself an assistant coaching job, largely with the allure of bringing Bol with him. It did not work out, and Bol eventually enrolled at the University of Bridgeport.

Feeley finished head coaching with a career record of 285 wins and 148 losses. He died on September 18, 2020.

== Head coaching record ==
Record table
| Season | Team | Overall | Conference | Standing | Postseason |
|---|---|---|---|---|---|
Sacred Heart Pioneers () (1965–1978)
| 1965–66 | Sacred Heart | 13–8 | | | |
| 1966–67 | Sacred Heart | 12–12 | | | |
| 1967–68 | Sacred Heart | 16–10 | | | |
| 1968–69 | Sacred Heart | 16–8 | | | |
| 1969–70 | Sacred Heart | 23–6 | | | |
| 1970–71 | Sacred Heart | 22–6 | 5–3 | | NCAA College Division Regional 3rd Place Game |
| 1971–72 | Sacred Heart | 24–4 | | | NCAA College Division Regional 3rd Place |
| 1972–73 | Sacred Heart | 17–11 | | | |
| 1973–74 | Sacred Heart | 14–13 | | | |
| 1974–75 | Sacred Heart | 20–8 | | | NCAA Division II Regional 3rd Place |
| 1975–76 | Sacred Heart | 14–12 | | | |
| 1976–77 | Sacred Heart | 28–4 | | | |
| 1977–78 | Sacred Heart | 21–9 | | | NCAA Division II Elite Eight |
| Sacred Heart: | | 240–111 (.684) | | | |
Fairleigh Dickinson Knights (ECAC Metro) (1980–1983)
| 1980–81 | Fairleigh Dickinson | 12–14 | | 8th | |
| 1981–82 | Fairleigh Dickinson | 16–11 | 12–3 | 1st | |
| 1982–83 | Fairleigh Dickinson | 17–12 | 9–5 | 2nd (North) | |
| Fairleigh Dickinson: | | 45–37 (.549) | | | |
| Total: | | 285-148 (.658) | | | |
National champion Postseason invitational champion Conference regular season champion Conference regular season and conference tournament champion Division regular season champion Division regular season and conference tournament champion Conference tournament champion
