= World Conference against Racism =

International events sponsored by UNESCO

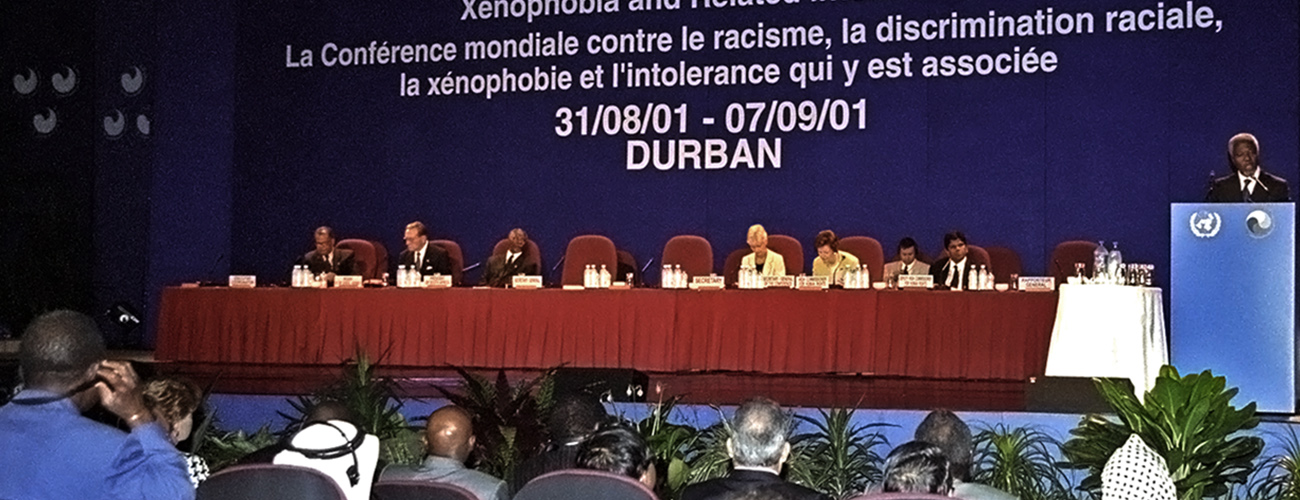
World Conference Against Racism

The World Conference Against Racism (WCAR) is a series of international events organized by UNESCO to promote struggle against racism ideologies and behaviours. Five conferences have been held so far, in 1978, 1983, 2001, 2009 and 2021. Founded after World War II and the Holocaust as a dependent body of the United Nations, UNESCO started as soon as it was created to promote scientific studies concerning ethnic groups and their diffusion in public opinion to dispel pseudo-scientific rationalizations of racism. One of its first published works was The Race Question in 1950, signed by various internationally renowned scholars.

== 1978 conference ==
The 1978 World Conference Against Racism was held in Geneva, Switzerland. A major focus on the conference was South Africa's apartheid policies of racial segregation and discrimination. This included condemnation of Israel–South Africa relations (in particular economic and military cooperation), a request that the United Nations Security Council consider "imposition of comprehensive and mandatory sanctions" on South Africa and other "racist regimes of southern Africa", and other criticism of apartheid in South Africa. There was also a declaration and program of action which resulted from the conference which condemned racial superiority, racism, and racial discrimination, and called for educational resources to promote "mutual understanding between all human beings and demonstrate...the...basis of ethnic and racial equality", among other statements.

== 1983 conference ==
The 1983 World Conference Against Racism was also held in Geneva, Switzerland.

== 2001 conference ==
The 2001 conference was held in Durban, South Africa, under UN auspices, from 31 August until 8 September 2001. Former Irish president Mary Robinson, then the UN High Commissioner for Human Rights, presided as secretary-general.

Entitled "World Conference Against Racism, Racial Discrimination, Xenophobia and Related Intolerance", the conference was discussing unfair treatment of one group against another . Significant time was focused specifically on Israeli treatment of Palestinians, treating violations of human rights and genocide in other parts of the world secondarily.

The 2001 meeting was marked by clashes over the Middle East and the legacy of slavery, and coincided with attacks on Israel and anti-Israel demonstrations at a parallel conference of non-governmental organizations. The U.S. and Israel withdrew midway through the conference over a draft resolution that, in their opinion, singled out Israel for criticism and likened Zionism to racism. The European Union also refused to accept wording by Arab states criticizing Israel for "racist practices."

Also in the conference, African countries, led by Nigeria and Zimbabwe, and African-American NGOs wanted individual apologies from each of the countries responsible for slavery, recognition of it as a crime against humanity, and reparations called as such. The Europeans pulled together behind the UK and the best the Africans could get was a call for support for the New African Initiative, debt relief, funds to combat AIDS, the recovery of stolen government funds transferred to the West by former dictators and their cohorts, and an end to the trafficking in people. But the word 'reparations' did not survive.

== 2009 conference ==
The 2009 World Conference Against Racism was held in Geneva, Switzerland. Canada, Israel, the United States of America, New Zealand, Germany, Italy, Sweden, the Netherlands, Poland and, after some initial skepticism, Australia announced they would not participate in the conference.

Mark Mardell of the BBC news reported: On the Monday the Conference was to begin, Italian Foreign Minister Franco Frattini (who was until last year the European Commissioner for security and justice) had told the Italian newspaper Il Giornale that Europe's failure to agree on a common approach was "a very serious mistake, because it shows our inability, despite all the words uttered in this connection, to come up with at least a lowest common denominator on a basic problem: namely the struggle against discrimination, on behalf of which we in Brussels so often speak out".

Frattini continued, "I should imagine that a compromise was preferred at any price. And this, despite the fact that in the documents prepared for the rendezvous in Geneva, apart from a few minor improvements, a basic approach has been maintained equating Israel with a racist country rather than a democracy. There are still unacceptable phrases which, if there had been a smidgen of consistency with what was said at the EU ministers' meeting, should have convinced people to forgo attending the conference – as we have decided to do, and as the United States, Canada, Australia, New Zealand, and The Netherlands have decided to do."

New Zealand's Foreign Minister Murray McCully said he was not satisfied that the wording of the review would prevent the conference from "descending into the same kind of rancorous and unproductive debate that took place in 2001," and he reported that he was concerned that it could be used by Muslim countries to criticize Israel and to limit free speech when it comes to criticizing their religion.

On the opening day of the conference, France said that Europeans would walk out if Ahmadinejad made any antisemitic remarks. "We will have to be very clear. We will not tolerate any slips," French Foreign Minister Bernard Kouchner told France Info. "If he utters racist or anti-Semitic accusations, we will leave the room immediately."

Germany had decided to stay away from the meeting amid western concerns that the event may take on antisemitic overtones, a senior official confirmed in Berlin Thursday.

In his opening address, Secretary-General of UN Ban Ki-moon said, "Some nations who by rights should be helping us to forge a path to a better future are not here. Outside these halls, interest groups of many political and ideological stripes shout against one another in acrimony."

Later in the day, about 40 delegates walked out during Iranian president Mahmoud Ahmadinejad's speech after he described Israel as a "racist government" and attacked the creation of the state of Israel. France, which had warned of a walkout, described it as "hate speech", the BBC reported.

The walkout was a public relations disaster for the United Nations, which had hoped the conference would be a shining example of what the UN is supposed to do best: uniting to combat injustice in the world, said the BBC's Imogen Foulkes in Geneva. Her colleague Jeremy Paxman described the walkout as a "stunt", arguing that people should have the right to criticise Zionism.

President Ahmadinejad, the only major leader to attend the conference, said Jewish migrants from Europe and the United States had been sent to the Middle East after World War II "in order to establish a racist government in the occupied Palestine". He continued, through an interpreter: "And in fact, in compensation for the dire consequences of racism in Europe, they helped bring to power the most cruel and repressive racist regime in Palestine." French Ambassador Jean-Baptiste Mattei said: "As soon as he started to address the question of the Jewish people and Israel, we had no reason to stay in the room."

British ambassador Peter Gooderham, also among those who left, said Ahmadinejad's comments were "offensive and inflammatory. ... Such outrageous anti-Semitic remarks should have no place in a UN anti-racism forum", he announced to gathered reporters.

A webcast of Ahmadinejad's speech was made available by the United Nations, and the Foreign Policy Journal, an online news publisher, rushed out a transcript.

== 2021 conference ==
In September 2021, the UN General Assembly commemorated the 20th anniversary of its 2001 conference by pledging to redouble its anti-racist efforts. The event was boycotted by Albania, Australia, Austria, Bulgaria, Canada, Colombia, Croatia, Cyprus, Czech Republic, Denmark, Dominican Republic, Estonia, France, Georgia, Germany, Greece, Honduras, Hungary, Israel, Italy, Latvia, Lithuania, Montenegro, Moldova, Netherlands, New Zealand, North Macedonia, Poland, Romania, Serbia, Slovakia, Slovenia, Spain, Sweden, Ukraine, United Kingdom, United States and Uruguay. The European Union also did not participate or speak at the commemoration.

== See also ==
- Durban III
- Israel and apartheid
- International Day for Tolerance
- United Nations General Assembly Resolution 3379
