= Durban Review Conference =

2009 conference held at the United Nations in Geneva, Switzerland

The Durban Review Conference is the official name of the 2009 United Nations World Conference Against Racism (WCAR), also known as Durban II. The conference ran from Monday 20 April to Friday 24 April 2009, and took place at the United Nations Office in Geneva, Switzerland. The conference was called under the mandate of United Nations General Assembly resolution 61/149 (passed in 2006) with a mandate to review the implementation of The Durban Declaration and Programme of Action from the 2001 World Conference against Racism, Racial Discrimination, Xenophobia and Related Intolerance which took place in Durban, South Africa.

The conference was boycotted by Australia, Canada, Germany, Israel, Italy, the Netherlands, New Zealand, Poland, and the United States. The Czech Republic discontinued its attendance on the first day, and twenty-three other European Union countries sent low-level delegations. The western countries had expressed concerns that the conference would be used to promote antisemitism and laws against blasphemy perceived as contrary to the principles of free speech, and that the conference would not deal with homophobia. European countries also criticized the meeting for focusing on the West and ignoring problems of racism and intolerance in the developing world.

Controversy surrounded the attendance of Iranian President Mahmoud Ahmadinejad at the conference due to his past statements on Israel and the Holocaust. On the first day of the conference, Ahmadinejad, the only head of state to attend, made a speech condemning Israel as "totally racist" and accusing the West of using the Holocaust as a "pretext" for aggression against Palestinians. The distributed English version of the speech referred to the Holocaust as an "ambiguous and dubious question". When Ahmadinejad began to speak about Israel, all the European Union delegates left the conference room, while a number of the remaining delegates applauded the Iranian President. UN Secretary-General Ban Ki-moon expressed dismay at both the boycotts and the speech.

Durban III took place on 22 September 2011 in New York, and was boycotted by 14 countries: Australia, Austria, Bulgaria, Canada, the Czech Republic, France, Germany, Israel, Italy, the Netherlands, New Zealand, Poland, the United Kingdom and the United States.

Durban IV took place on 22 September 2021 in New York, and was boycotted by 37 countries: Albania, Australia, Austria, Bulgaria, Canada, Colombia, Croatia, Cyprus, Czech Republic, Denmark, Dominican Republic, Estonia, France, Georgia, Germany, Greece, Honduras, Hungary, Israel, Italy, Latvia, Lithuania, North Macedonia, Montenegro, Moldova, Netherlands, New Zealand, Poland, Romania, Serbia, Slovakia, Slovenia, Sweden, Ukraine, the United Kingdom, the United States and Uruguay.

== Committee ==
The Durban Review Conference was run by the Bureau of the Preparatory Committee, which was chaired by Ms. Najat Al-Hajjaji of Libya. The eighteen vice-chairpersons hailed from Cameroon, South Africa, Senegal, India, Indonesia, Iran, Pakistan, Argentina, Brazil, Chile, Armenia, Croatia, Estonia, Russia, Belgium, Greece, Norway and Turkey, and the vice-chairman-rapporteur was from Cuba.

== Objectives ==
According to the UN website, in August 2007 the Preparatory Committee set forth the following objectives for the Durban Review Conference:

1. To review progress and assess implementation of The Durban Declaration and Programme of Action by all stakeholders at the national, regional and international levels, including assessment of contemporary manifestations of racism, racial discrimination, xenophobia and related intolerance, through an inclusive, transparent and collaborative process, and identification of concrete measures and initiatives for combating and eliminating all manifestations of these phenomena;
2. To assess the effectiveness of the existing Durban follow-up mechanisms and other relevant UN mechanisms dealing with the issues of racism, racial discrimination, xenophobia and related intolerance in order to enhance them;
3. To promote the universal ratification and implementation of the International Convention on the Elimination of All Forms of Racial Discrimination, and proper consideration of the recommendations of the Committee on the Elimination of Racial Discrimination;
4. To identify and share good practices achieved in the fight against racism, racial discrimination, xenophobia and related intolerance.

== Attendance ==
=== Participation ===
Delegates from 141 countries participated in the conference:

Afghanistan, Albania, Algeria, Andorra, Argentina, Armenia, Austria, Azerbaijan, Bahrain, Bangladesh, Barbados, Belarus, Belgium, Benin, Bhutan, Bolivia, Bosnia and Herzegovina, Botswana, Brazil, Brunei Darussalam, Bulgaria, Burkina Faso, Burundi, Cambodia, Cameroon, Central African Republic, Chad, Chile, China, Colombia, Congo, Costa Rica, Côte d'Ivoire, Croatia, Cuba, Cyprus, Czech Republic, Democratic People's Republic of Korea, Democratic Republic of the Congo, Denmark, Djibouti, Dominican Republic, Ecuador, Egypt, El Salvador, Equatorial Guinea, Eritrea, Estonia, Ethiopia, Finland, France, Gambia, Ghana, Greece, Guatemala, Guinea, Guyana, Haiti, Holy See, Honduras, Hungary, Iceland, India, Indonesia, Iran (Islamic Republic of), Iraq, Ireland, Jamaica, Japan, Jordan, Kazakhstan, Kenya, Kuwait, Kyrgyzstan, Lao People's Democratic Republic, Latvia, Lebanon, Lesotho, Libyan Arab Jamahiriya, Liechtenstein, Lithuania, Luxembourg, Macedonia, Madagascar, Malawi, Malaysia, Maldives, Mali, Malta, Mauritania, Mauritius, Mexico, Monaco, Montenegro, Morocco, Mozambique, Myanmar, Namibia, Nepal, Nicaragua, Niger, Nigeria, Norway, Oman, Pakistan, Panama, Paraguay, Peru, Philippines, Portugal, Qatar, Republic of Korea, Romania, Russian Federation, Rwanda, Samoa, Saudi Arabia, Senegal, Serbia, Singapore, Slovakia, Slovenia, Solomon Islands, South Africa, Spain, Sri Lanka, Sudan, Surinam, Swaziland, Sweden, Switzerland, Syrian Arab Republic, Thailand, Timor-Leste, Togo, Trinidad and Tobago, Tunisia, Turkey, Uganda, Ukraine, United Arab Emirates, United Kingdom of Great-Britain and Northern Ireland, United Republic of Tanzania, Uruguay, Uzbekistan, Venezuela (Bolivarian Republic of), Vietnam, Yemen, Zambia, Zimbabwe.

Other entities represented: Palestine.

Other participants as observers: Council of Europe, Organisation Internationale de la Francophonie, European Union.

Specialized agencies represented: International Labor Organization, Joint United Nations Programme on HIV/AIDS, UN Conference on Trade and Development, UN Educational, Scientific and Cultural Organization, UN High Commissioner for Refugees, UN Industrial Development Organization.

The following intergovernmental organizations and other entities were represented: African Union, European Commission Against Racism and Intolerance, Inter-American Development Bank, League of Arab States, The Organization for Security and Co-operation in Europe, Office for Democratic Institutions and Human Rights, Organization of the Islamic Conference.

Also represented: three UN programmes and funds and some twenty Human Rights bodies and mechanisms.

Also represented: 39 national human rights institutions from Africa, Asia, the Americas, Europe and Oceania, and between 400 and 500 NGOs.

=== Boycotts ===
No information. Switzerland (host country). Members of the conference's Bureau of the Preparatory Committee (who attended the conference). States (that are not part of the Preparatory Committee) that attended. States that boycotted the Durban Review Conference.

Nine countries boycotted the conference entirely.

- Canada on 23 January 2008 was the first country to announce it would not participate in the conference. A joint statement by cabinet ministers Maxime Bernier and Jason Kenney said the 2001 conference "degenerated into open and divisive expressions of intolerance and anti-Semitism that undermined the principles of the United Nations and the very goals the conference sought to achieve." Canada said it "had hoped that the preparatory process for the 2009 Durban Review Conference would remedy the mistakes of the past" but Canada had concluded the process was too flawed to make the conference " worthwhile." In a subsequent interview on 20 April, Canadian Prime Minister Stephen Harper defended the decision to boycott the conference, stating that "Canada will not lend its name and reputation to an international conference that promotes these kinds of things" and that it was clear early on that the conference would be used to "scapegoat the Jewish people." He added that Canada "will participate in any international conference that combats racism. We will not, however, lend Canada's good name to those, such as Durban II, that promote it."
- Israel on 19 November 2008 announced it would boycott the conference. Israel's Foreign Minister, Tzipi Livni, stated, "The documents prepared for the conference indicate that it is turning once again into an anti-Israeli tribunal, singling out and delegitimizing the State of Israel." She said, "The conference has nothing to do with fighting racism. In view of this situation, I decided that Israel will not participate and will not legitimize the Durban II conference." On 19 April 2009, Avigdor Lieberman, Livni's successor as Foreign Minister, called the conference "a hypocrisy summit," saying the fact that Iranian President and Holocaust denier Mahmoud Ahmadinejad had been invited to speak at the conference proved its true character. "An international convention that invites a racist such as Ahmadinejad, – who preaches the extermination of the State of Israel day and night – and which allows him to make a central speech, demonstrates both its goal and its character," Lieberman said, adding that Israel could not ignore that a Holocaust-denier had been invited to take part in a convention taking place on the very same day that the Jewish people commemorate Holocaust Remembrance Day to remember the six million Jews murdered in Europe by Nazi Germany and its accomplices. Israel had previously withdrawn from the 2001 Durban Conference.
- The United States on 27 February 2009 announced it would boycott the conference. The American delegation in attendance at the conference's preparatory talks concluded that "the anti-Israel and anti-Western tendencies were too deeply entrenched to excise." The US State Department said the planned outcome document being drafted for the meeting had "gone from bad to worse, and the current text... is not salvageable... A conference based on this text would be a missed opportunity to speak clearly about the persistent problem of racism." However, in an interview on 4 April, United States Ambassador to the United Nations Susan Rice expressed her feeling that the content of the latest draft had improved and that a decision on the United States' involvement in the conference had not been made. Deliberation inside the Obama administration ended on 18 April: "With regret, the United States will not join the review conference," said State Department spokesman Robert Wood. Wood said the conference document reaffirmed a declaration that emerged from the original Durban conference which the United States had opposed, and that the United States was concerned over new additions to the text regarding "incitement," that run counter to the U.S. commitment to unfettered free speech. The following day, President Barack Obama said "I would love to be involved in a useful conference that addressed continuing issues of racism and discrimination around the globe," but stressed that the language of the U.N.'s draft declaration "raised a whole set of objectionable provisions" and risked a reprise Durban, "which became a session through which folks expressed antagonism toward Israel in ways that were oftentimes completely hypocritical and counterproductive." The United States had withdrawn from the 2001 Durban Conference, and did not attend the 1978 and 1985 World Conferences Against Racism.
- Italy on 5 March 2009 announced a boycott of the conference. Italian Foreign Minister Franco Frattini said it was because of "aggressive and anti-Semitic statements in the draft of the event's final document." Ministry Spokesman Maurizio Massari confirmed Frattini's statements, and charged that the final draft document of the Durban Review Conference contained "expressions of anti-Semitism." Massari said Rome would not participate in the conference unless the document was changed.
- Australia on 19 April announced a boycott of the conference. "Regrettably, we cannot be confident that the Review Conference will not again be used as a platform to air offensive views, including anti-Semitic views," Smith said on 19 April.
- Germany on 14 March announced the German federal government was considering a boycott of the conference. The German federal government Commissioner for Human Rights Policy and Humanitarian Aid, Günter Nooke, said "In the first instance we should try everything to improve the text of the final document," but also that "Germany should not lend itself to a conference that tries to one-sidedly incriminate Israel." On 16 April, Nooke stated at this point it was very unlikely that Germany would attend the Durban conference. On 19 April, U.N. spokesman Rupert Colville said Germany informed the global body that it would boycott the conference out of concern that it could be "abused as a platform for other interests."
- Netherlands on 19 April joined the boycott. "The conference against racism is too important to allow it to be abused for political purposes and attacks against the West," Dutch Foreign Minister Maxime Verhagen said in a statement. Verhagen said the draft for the conference represents a "wasted opportunity" to address human rights violations by countries and organizations involved in discrimination on sexual, religious and racial biases. "The conference places Israel as the only defendant," he stated.
- New Zealand on 19 April announced a boycott of the conference. McCully stated that his government is not satisfied the wording emerging from discussions held ahead of the conference will prevent it from becoming a repeat of the 2001 conference.
- Poland on 20 April announced a boycott of the conference. Polish Foreign Minister Radosław Sikorski stated that "We have reason to believe that the Conference will once again be exploited, as was the case in Durban in 2001, as a forum for unacceptable statements contrary to the spirit of respect for other races and religions."

=== Boycott threats and limited participation ===
Several countries sent only low level delegations that included no senior government officials. Some of these had originally considered boycotting the conference.

- In early November 2008, Per Stig Møller, Denmark's Foreign Minister, announced that Denmark will not attend the conference if a proposal to equate criticism of religion with racism is included on the agenda. However, Denmark did send an ambassador to the conference. Per Stig Møller has however declared, that if other countries follow in the Iranian path, Denmark shall walk out.
- On 16 March 2009, the European Union stated it would boycott the conference unless major changes were made to its declaration. Britain said it would not attend unless the draft showed a "change in direction."
- (Sweden) On 18 April, Swedish Integration Minister Nyamko Sabuni announced that her government would boycott the conference, sending no ministerial officials to the event, due to worry that it would be a repeat of the last conference on racism. She said that a ministerial presence would "legitimize undemocratic forces." However, a low-level delegation was sent instead.
- On 19 April, the United Kingdom announced that it would attend the conference. The delegation was led by Peter Gooderham, the British ambassador to the United Nations in Geneva. However, Britain's Foreign Minister also stated that Britain would "walk out" of the conference if "red lines" on language such relating to antisemitism, the Holocaust and Blasphemy were crossed.
- On 19 April, a source close to French President Nicolas Sarkozy's office told the Agence France-Presse that France would send a low level delegation to the conference. The source stated that "France will go to Geneva ... in order to articulate its standpoint on human rights issues." However, Rama Yade, the Junior Minister for Human Rights, warned that France would "not tolerate any verbal slander" and that "Our position must be backed up by a verbal political offensive. So that people understand that this conference is not only a diplomatic victory but the continuation of a fierce battle for the victims of racism and discriminations. This message must be absolutely clear."
- The Czech Republic (which held the EU presidency at the time) sent a low level delegation to the conference. However, following a speech by Iranian President Mahmoud Ahmadinejad at the opening of the conference on 20 April, the country withdrew its entire delegation for the remainder of the conference.

=== Reactions to boycotts ===
- (United Nations) On 17 March 2009, Yuri Boychenko, chairman of the group responsible for drafting the conference's declaration, issued a draft that omitted any reference to the Palestinian territories or to defamation of religion in hopes of preventing a widescale boycott by Western nations. UN High Commissioner for Human Rights Navi Pillay said all disputed points such as references to Israel, Zionism and the Middle East had been deleted from the declaration. She added that she was confident that all parties would approve the reworked statement and decide to attend the upcoming meeting in Geneva. In his opening address to the conference, Secretary-General Ban Ki-moon said, "some nations who by rights should be helping us to forge a path to a better future are not here. Outside these halls, interest groups of many political and ideological stripes shout against one another in acrimony."
- (Vatican City) Pope Benedict XVI on 19 April 2009 hailed the U.N. anti-racism conference and urged countries to join forces to eliminate intolerance, but he made no reference to the boycotts of the meeting. He said he sincerely hoped that delegates who attend the conference work together, "with a spirit of dialogue and reciprocal acceptance, to put an end to every form of racism, discrimination and intolerance." He added that it would be "a fundamental step toward the affirmation of the universal value of the dignity of man and his rights."
- (Iran) On 19 April, Iranian President Mahmoud Ahmedinejad commented on the controversy surrounding the summit in a televised speech, implying that it was due to a Zionist plot. "It is clear that the Zionists and their backers will undertake everything possible so that the voices of those people suppressed will be silenced... [the] Zionists control an important part of the politics in the U.S. and Europe and used this influence, especially in the media, to force their demands, which are nothing more than the plundering of nations, onto the world," he said.
- Most members of the European Union, including France and the United Kingdom, ultimately decided to attend the conference, although they sent low-level delegations (no cabinet ministers attended) and walked out of the conference during a speech by Iranian President Mahmoud Ahmedinejad.
- (Austria) On the opening day of the conference, Austrian Foreign Minister Michael Spindelegger, of the conservative People's Party, criticized European Union countries who boycotted the conference as representing "not a sign of strength" for the EU.
- The following day, France's Foreign Minister Bernard Kouchner criticized the United States for boycotting the conference."It's paradoxical – they don't want to listen to Iran in Geneva but they are ready to talk to them," Kouchner told French radio Europe 1. "More than a paradox, that could really be a mistake."

=== Summary ===
- Members of the Human Rights Council:
  Algeria, Azerbaijan, Bahrain, Bangladesh, People's Republic of China, Djibouti, Ecuador, Gabon, Ghana, Guatemala, Jordan, Mali, Mauritius, Mexico, Morocco, Nigeria, Peru, Philippines, Russia, Saudi Arabia, Sri Lanka, Tunisia, Uruguay.
- Members of the Human Rights Council that voted against/abstained from the conference:
  Finland, Japan, South Korea, Ukraine.
- Nine countries boycotted the conference entirely:
  Australia, Canada, Germany, Israel, Italy, Netherlands, New Zealand, Poland, United States.
- One nation broke off its attendance after the first day, joining the boycott:
  Czech Republic (holding the EU presidency at the time)
- The conference's Bureau of the Preparatory Committee:
  Argentina, Armenia, Belgium, Brazil, Chile, Croatia, Cuba, Czech Republic (left), Estonia, Greece, India, Indonesia, Iran, Libya, Norway, Pakistan, Russia, Senegal, South Africa, Turkey.
- Confirmed attendance (non-preparatory committee members):
  East Timor, France, Ireland, Lesotho, Montenegro, Nigeria, Switzerland, Togo, United Kingdom, Vatican City, Zambia.

== Ahmadinejad's participation ==
Iranian President Mahmoud Ahmadinejad was the only head of state to attend the conference and hence delivered a speech on its first day. European countries had expressed fears that a commotion in regard to Israel's right to exist and the Holocaust would be raised by Ahmadinejad and some of the other delegates attending the event.

A collection of human rights groups challenged the Iranian leader at the meet, charging that religious discrimination was widespread in Iran, notably the persecution of Baháʼís, Christians, Jews, Sufis, Sunni Muslims, and other minorities, through arbitrary arrests, intimidation and harassment. The human rights groups called on governments taking part in the conference, as well as the media, to hold Ahmadinejad accountable for violations in Iran.

A meeting between Ahmadinejad and Swiss President Hans-Rudolph Merz before the conference created a minor diplomatic row between Switzerland and Israel. Jerusalem recalled its ambassador to Bern "for consultations" in protest at the meet, an Israeli Foreign Ministry official explaining: "We understand the Swiss are obliged to host the conference as part of their UN commitments, we understand that the Iranian President has to be given a visa. What we don't understand is why the Swiss President greeted Ahmadinejad on arrival." Speaking at a state ceremony marking the beginning of Holocaust Remembrance Day, Israeli Prime Minister Benjamin Netanyahu directed a question at the Swiss president, saying "I turn to you, the Swiss president, and ask you: How can you meet someone who denies the Holocaust and wishes for a new holocaust to occur?" In response, the Swiss foreign ministry released a statement saying it "deplores the excessive language used in this context by different Israeli representatives," and summoned the Israeli representative to Bern.

=== Speech ===
In his opening speech, Ahmadinejad said that the Zionist creation of Israel in the British Mandate of Palestine was accomplished by "military aggressions to make an entire nation homeless under the pretext of Jewish suffering." He said that migrants from around the world (such as Europe or the United States) descended on Palestine and set up "a totally racist government", and that "in compensation for the dire consequences of racism in Europe, they helped bring to power the most cruel and repressive racist regime in Palestine."

The speech was disrupted at the start by members of the French Union of Jewish Students as Ahmadinejad opened with a Muslim prayer. The two rainbow-wigged protesters tossed red clown noses at Ahmadinejad and shouted "racist, racist" before being escorted from the room. The protesters said that they had been trying to convey "the masquerade that this conference represents."

Within minutes of the speech's opening, dozens of delegates from at least thirty countries, including all the European Union countries in attendance, left the room to return when Ahmadinejad's speech was over. The Czech Republic announced that it would join the boycott of the conference in protest over the speech. The BBC described the exit as a "public relations disaster" for the United Nations. Many of those who remained to listen to Ahmadinejad's speech applauded his remarks. The countries whose delegates participated in the walkout were: Austria, Belgium, Bulgaria, Cyprus, the Czech Republic (which left the conference for good), Denmark, Estonia, Finland, France, Greece, Hungary, Ireland, Latvia, Lithuania, Luxembourg, Malta, Portugal, Romania, Slovakia, Slovenia, Spain, Sweden, St. Kitts and Nevis and the United Kingdom.

The English text version of the speech, handed out by the Iranian delegation, stated that after World War II the Allies had created the state of Israel "on the pretext of Jewish sufferings and the ambiguous and dubious question of holocaust." On the following day, the UN revealed that the Iranian president had originally intended to include the phrasing in his speech, rather than "the abuse of the question of the holocaust" he used.

The speech was deplored by UN Secretary-General Ban Ki-moon. Navi Pillay, High Commissioner for Human Rights condemned the speech, but also objected to the walkout. European Union presidency said the remarks were "unacceptable" while European Jewish groups condemned the speech. Concern was also expressed that the speech would derail the conference or divert attention from its purposes.

Ahmadinejad received a hero's welcome upon his return to Tehran on 21 April, where he was greeted by supporters at the airport with "Death to Israel" slogans. The conservative media in Iran hailed Ahmadinejad's speech, while the reformist press focused on the walkout and demonstrations, but without criticizing the president. The speech was also supported by Lebanese militant group and government participant Hezbollah and by Gazan ruling group Hamas. On the day of Ahmadinejad's return, the Iranian Foreign Ministry summoned a European Union representative in Tehran to protest what Iran called the EU's "double standard" with regards to racism. On the following day, Iran sent a letter of protest to UN Secretary-General Ban Ki-moon for criticizing Ahmadinejad's speech, claiming the Iranian president "was subjected to unfair and unwarranted harsh criticism."

Ahmadinejad speech: full text, BBC News

Original draft of speech, BBC News

=== Reactions to speech ===
- (United Nations) UN Secretary-General Ban Ki-moon expressed dismay at the incident, describing the words chosen by President Ahmadinejad as being those that are used "to accuse, divide and even incite". Ban stated that he had asked Ahmadinejad in advance not to focus on "divisiveness" in his address and that "It is deeply regrettable that my plea to look to the future of unity was not heeded by the Iranian president. This is the opposite of what this conference seeks to achieve. This makes it significantly more difficult to build constructive solutions to the very real problem of racism," Ban said in a statement following Ahmadinejad's speech." High Commissioner for Human Rights Navi Pillay condemned Ahmadinejad but objected to the walkout, saying "I condemn the use of a UN forum for political grandstanding. I find this totally objectionable. ... The best riposte for this type of event is to reply and correct, not to withdraw and boycott the conference." Pillay also described Ahmadinejad as "somebody who traditionally makes obnoxious statements."
- (Iran) At a later press conference, Ahmadinejad criticized the countries which boycotted or walked out of the summit as "arrogant and selfish," and asked of the walkout, "Why is it that the so-called advocates of freedom of information fear hearing other people's opinions?"
- Speaking at a state ceremony marking Holocaust Remembrance Day, Israeli President Shimon Peres called Ahmadinejad's appearance at the conference "a deplorable disgrace," commenting on his speech "Nazism has been crushed, but anti-Semitism is still alive. The gas has evaporated, but the poison remains." In a letter to parliamentary counterparts abroad, Speaker of the Knesset Reuven Rivlin wrote "This time, Hitler has a beard and speaks Persian," and compared the conference to the 1936 Berlin Olympics, calling on legislators to take action against the Iranian president and not to ignore his anti-Israel pronouncements and threats.
- The Czech Republic's Foreign Ministry, which held the European Union's rotating presidency at the time, announced shortly after the speech that it was breaking off its attendance at the conference in protest. A statement issued by the ministry described as unacceptable Ahmadinejad's description of the Israeli government as racist, stating that Prague therefore did not wish to lend weight to his "anti-Israeli attacks" by remaining present at the conference.
- Foreign Minister of Norway Jonas Gahr Støre, who addressed the conference after Ahmadinejad's statements, said "Norway will not accept that the odd man out hijacks the collective efforts of many," adding the statements "run counter to the very spirit of dignity of the conference."
- The presidency of the European Union said in a statement: "The European Union rejects in strongest terms views expressed by President Mahmoud Ahmadinejad labelling Israel as (a) racist regime."
- (France) French officials described it as a "hate speech".
- (United Kingdom) Peter Gooderham, Britain's envoy to the U.N., stated that his nation "unreservedly condemns Iranian President Ahmadinejad's offensive and inflammatory comments. Such outrageous, anti-Semitic remarks should have no place in a U.N. anti-racism forum."
- (Slovenia) Andrej Logar, the Slovenian ambassador, said Ahmadinejad's remarks were "detrimental to the dignity of this conference".
- (Vatican City) The Vatican described Ahmadinejad's comments as "extremist and unacceptable".
- Russia's foreign ministry criticised Ahmadinejad's attack on Israel as "hard and lacking balance."
- (China) The Chinese government called for the international community to end its criticisms and focus on the conference's goals. "We hope relevant parties can step up dialogue, eliminate disputes and concentrate on a consensus so as to combat racism with one voice," said Foreign Ministry spokeswoman Jiang Yu.
- Brazil's foreign ministry, in a statement, declared that: "Ahmadinejad trivialized the meaning of tragic and historically established events like the Holocaust" and "Such comments damage the climate for dialogue and the understanding necessary for international efforts to end discrimination". Brazil confirmed Ahmadinejad's visit to the country at 6 May, when these concerns would be expressed to him.
- Officials from the United States, which boycotted the conference, stated that Ahmadinejad's comments will "feed racial hatred." Alejandro Wolff, the U.S. deputy ambassador to the U.N., called Ahmadinejad's remarks "vile," "hateful" and "inciteful," and praised Secretary-General Ban Ki-moon for condemning them.

== Other events and incidents ==
=== Alternative summits ===
On 19 April, the day before the opening of the UN conference, UN Watch and other non-governmental organizations hosted the "Geneva Summit for Human Rights, Tolerance and Democracy," in order to raise public awareness to the issues of discrimination and racially motivated torture. Invited speakers included survivors of the genocide in Rwanda and former dissidents from Iran, Cuba and Burma. UN Watch also hosted a "Conference Against Racism, Discrimination, and Persecution" in Geneva. Speakers at the latter conference included former Canadian Justice Minister Irwin Cotler, French philosopher Bernard-Henri Lévy and former Miss Canada and President of Stop Child Executions Nazanin Afshin Jam. Other events in Geneva opposing the UN conference were attended by Nobel laureate Elie Wiesel, Harvard law professor and liberal activist Alan Dershowitz, former Soviet dissident Natan Sharansky, and film star Jon Voight.

A "Durban II counter-conference" was held in New York City on the same dates as the conference in Geneva. The counter-conference was sponsored by the American Association of Jewish Lawyers and Jurists and co-sponsored by more than 20 organizations. According to the organizers, the event was held to "address the real issues of racism, racial discrimination, xenophobia and other forms of intolerance which the Durban I and Durban II were officially convened to address; but as happened at Durban I, the Durban II proceedings in Geneva will likely ignore, distort, or misrepresent these issues."

=== Parallel summits ===
Palestinian and anti-Israel NGOs held a parallel meeting to official events, entitled the "Israel Review Conference: 'United Against Apartheid, Colonialism and Occupation, Dignity & Justice for the Palestinian People,'" in a Geneva hotel on 19 April, before the Durban Review Conference had begun. The anti-Israel conference was organized by the International Jewish Anti-Zionist Network, the International Coordinating Network on Palestine and the Boycott, Divestment and Sanctions (BDS) Committee, and was attended by some 160 participants. A related initiative was the "NGO Civil Society Forum March against Racism," attended by Israeli Arab Member of Knesset Jamal Zahalka, who presented himself as a Palestinian victim of "Israeli racist apartheid," and by former UN Human Rights Council Rapporteur on Racism Doudou Diene. Yet another event was the "Civil Society Forum for the Durban Review Conference," in which Diene also spoke.

=== Statement by Libyan torture victim ===
In a pre-summit planning meeting, Ashraf Ahmed El-Hojouj, a Palestinian doctor who had been tortured in Libyan prisons after being accused of deliberately infecting children with HIV, announced he was filing a legal complaint to the UN Human Rights Council. "The United Nations should condemn countries that scapegoat, falsely arrest, and torture vulnerable minorities," said Hojouj, who addressed Najjat Al-Hajjaji, the Libyan chairwoman of the proceedings. Hajjaji was reported to have been visibly uncomfortable during the proceedings and interrupted Hojouj three times during his testimony. She then gave Libya the floor to make an objection, and finally cut Hojouj off. Hojouj was slated to testify before the summit on 17 April.

=== Expulsions ===
The UN expelled from the conference three activist groups for "unacceptable disruptive behavior." The Iranian Neda Institute for Political and Scientific Research was kicked out for distributing inflammatory material to meeting participants, while the Union of Jewish Students of France and the London-based group The Coexist Foundation were removed for disrupting Ahmadinejad's speech. In all, the credentials of 64 representatives from the three groups were revoked. Two journalists representing the conservative magazine and website Townhall were also expelled for disrupting the proceedings after one tried to take over the podium while the other filmed the scene.

== Outcome document ==
On 21 April, the second day of the conference, the delegates agreed on a 143-point declaration to combat racism and discrimination against minorities. The declaration also warned against stereotyping people because of their religion, a key demand of Islamic states who said that Muslims have been unfairly targeted since the 11 September attacks on the United States. In addition, the declaration reaffirmed principles agreed at the 2001 Durban Conference. The document did not include the concept that the defamation of religion is racist and should be banned.

Approval of the declaration was originally scheduled for 24 April. Delegates said that the controversial opening speech by Iranian President Mahmoud Ahmadinejad strengthened their resolve to adopt the declaration as soon as possible, so they advanced the adoption to 21 April. U.N. High Commissioner for Human Rights Navi Pillay described the declaration as an answer to Ahmadinejad's tirade. French Foreign Minister Bernard Kouchner echoed Pillay's comment, saying, "The text was adopted, therefore he [Ahmadinejad] has failed."

Amos Wako, president of the meeting in Geneva, described the 16-page document as a "historic outcome." Navi Pillay called the declaration a "carefully balanced and yet meaningful" final document, which enshrined "a common aspiration to defy racism in all its manifestations and work to stamp it out wherever it may occur."

== See also ==
- World Conference against Racism
- World Conference against Racism 2001
- Anti-racism
- Israel and the United Nations
- Antisemitism
- New antisemitism
- Israeli apartheid
- UN Watch
