= Peter Gooderham =

British diplomat

Peter Olaf Gooderham CMG

Permanent Representative to the WTO and UN in Geneva
- In office 2008–2012
- Monarch: Elizabeth II
- Prime Minister: Gordon Brown; David Cameron
- Preceded by: Nicholas Thorne
- Succeeded by: Karen Pierce

Personal details
- Born: 29 July 1954 (age 72)
- Education: Newcastle University (BA); University of Bristol (PhD)
- Occupation: International Director, Ministry of Justice

Peter Olaf Gooderham CMG (born 29 July 1954) is a British diplomat, currently serving as International Director at the Ministry of Justice.

He completed a BA in Politics and Economics at Newcastle University in 1975. After a brief period of working as a management trainee, Gooderham spent the period 1976–78 completing a PhD in Modern History at Bristol University.

From 2004 to 2007 he was the Foreign and Commonwealth Office's Director of the Middle East and North Africa Directorate, based in London. In that role he provided information to the House of Commons Select Committee on International Development on the work of the Quartet on the Middle East and Hamas.

Gooderham was the United Kingdom's Permanent Representative to the United Nations and other international organisations at Geneva 2008–12. He attracted news attention for walking out, with delegates from at least 30 countries, in protest at Iranian President Mahmoud Ahmadinejad's speech during the 2009 Durban Review Conference.
