= Francis Bok =

Former Sudanese slave, abolitionist (born 1979)

- Born: February 1979 (age 47); Sudan
- Occupations: State Minister of Information, Youth and Sports for Lol State, South Sudan, author; abolitionist
- Spouse: Atak
- Children: Buk and Dhal
- Parent(s): Bol Buk Dol and Adut Al Akok

Francis Piol Bol Bok (born February 1979), a Dinka tribesman and citizen of South Sudan, was a slave for ten years and later became an abolitionist and author living in the United States.

== Biography ==
On May 15, 1986, he was captured and enslaved at the age of seven during an Arab militia raid on the village of Nyamlell in southern Sudan during the Second Sudanese Civil War. Bok lived in bondage for ten years before escaping imprisonment in Kurdufan, Sudan, followed by a journey to the United States by way of Cairo, Egypt.

Bok was aided by people of diverse cultures and faiths in his journey to freedom. His earliest steps towards the United States were helped by a northern Sudanese Muslim family that believed that slavery was wrong and provided him a bus ticket to Khartoum. Upon arriving, Bok was aided by a fellow Dinka tribesman and members of the Fur people, and his trip to the United States was paid for by members of the Evangelical Lutheran Church in America. His first point of contact in the United States was a refugee from Somalia who helped him get settled in Fargo, North Dakota.

Bok has testified before the United States Senate and met with George W. Bush, Madeleine Albright and Condoleezza Rice, telling them his story of slavery. He has been honored by the United States Olympic Committee, the Boston Celtics and colleges and universities throughout the United States and Canada. Francis now lives in the U.S. state of Kansas, where he works for the American Anti-Slavery Group (AASG) and Sudan Sunrise, an organization that works for peace in Sudan. Bok's autobiography, Escape from Slavery: The True Story of My Ten Years in Captivity and My Journey to Freedom in America, published by St. Martin's Press, chronicles his life, from his early youth, his years in captivity, to his work in the United States as an abolitionist.

== Childhood and abduction ==
Francis Bok was raised in a large Catholic family of cattle herders in the Dinka village of Gurion in Southern Sudan. His father, Bol Buk Dol, managed several herds of cattle, sheep and goats. When Bok was captured at the age of 7 on May 15, 1986, he could not count beyond 10 and knew very little of the outside world.

Bok was captured after his mother, Adut Al Akok, had sent him to the village of Nyamlell to sell eggs and peanuts in the village market with some older siblings and neighbors. This was Bok's first trip to the village without his mother, and it was the first time he was allowed to sell some of the family's goods at the market.

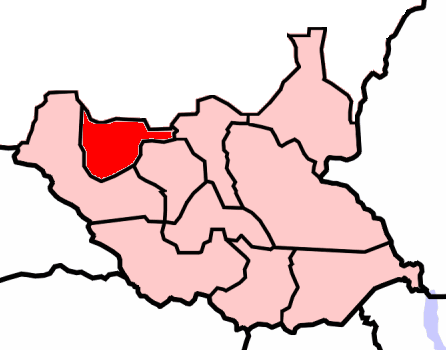
Nyamlell is in North Bahr al Ghazal

Bok went to the market, where he heard adults say that they had seen smoke coming from nearby villages and had heard gunfire in the distance. People began fleeing the market as Francis saw horsemen with machine guns. The gunmen surrounded the market and shot the men in Nyamlell. The raiders were part of an Islamic militia from the northern part of Sudan that conducted periodic raids on the villages of their Dinka neighbors, who were Christians or animists of Sub-Saharan African descent.

== Life as a slave ==
Seven-year-old Bok was captured by Giemma, a member of the slave hunting militia, who forced him to join a caravan of slaves, stolen produce, livestock and wares that the militia had captured in their raid of the Dinka settlement. When the members of the militia split up to return to their homes, Bok was taken by Giemma. Upon arriving at Giemma's residence, Bok was beaten by his captor's children with sticks and was called abeed. The word literally means 'slave' and the stereotype is that of an inferior, demeaned, Negroid race. Bok was given quarters in a hovel near the pens of Giemma's livestock.

Bok began a ten-year period of slavery at the hands of Giemma and his son Hamid. He was forced to tend the family's herds of livestock. He had to take them to pastures in the area and to local watering holes, where he saw other Dinka boys who were also forced to tend herds of livestock. He began to suspect that his life was going to change forever and that his father was not going to be able to save him. His attempts to speak to the other Dinka boys were futile, as they were speaking Arabic, which he could not understand; they also seemed afraid to speak to him.

According to Bok, as he grew older, Giemma and Hamid began to place more trust in his abilities as a herdsman. Care of the cattle, horses and camels was passed to Bok and he was able to spend more time alone with the animals. Previously he had been under the careful supervision of Hamid and sometimes Giemma. In addition to having him serve as his slave, Giemma forced Bok to convert to Islam and to take the Arabic name of Abdul Rahman, meaning 'servant of the compassionate one'. In his autobiography, Bok states that although he was forced to convert to Islam, he never stopped praying to God for strength to get him through his ordeal.

Bok tried twice to flee from slavery at the age of 14. The first instance happened early one morning after he had been sent out with the cattle. Bok blindly ran down a road for several miles before he was captured by one of Giemma's fellow militia members. Giemma's peer returned Bok to the Giemma's compound, where he was beaten with a bullwhip. Bok attempted to escape once again just two days later, when he fled in the opposite direction of his previous escape. He once again fled for several miles, this time keeping to the forest. He stopped for water at a local stream crossing, where he was spotted by Giemma who happened to be there as well. Giemma forced Bok back to his home, this time promising to kill him. Bok was beaten again, but Giemma chose not to kill him, as he had become too valuable to the family as a slave.

== Escape ==
Bok waited three years, until 1996, before he tried to escape again. During the intervening three years he tended to the herds and regained Giemma's trust. Giemma regularly praised Bok's work with the animals yet still forced him to live a life of slavery.

Bok finally escaped from Giemma when he was 17 years old by walking through the forest to the nearby market town of Mutari. Bok went to the local police department to seek help, and asked the police to help him find his people. Instead of helping him, the police made him their slave for two months. Bok escaped from the police by simply taking their donkeys to the well, tying them, and leaving them behind as he walked into the crowded marketplace.

Bok asked a man with a truck to give him a ride out of Mutari. The man, a Muslim named Abdah, agreed to help him. Abdah thought that slavery was wrong and agreed to transport Bok to the town of Ed-Da'Ein in the back of his truck amongst his cargo of grain and onions. Bok stayed with Abdah, his wife and two sons for two months while Abdah tried to find a way to take Bok to Khartoum, the capital city of Sudan. When he could not find a friend to provide passage to Khartoum, Abdah bought a bus ticket to Khartoum for Bok. Bok arrived in Khartoum with no money and no place to go. A stranger eventually helped him find his way to his fellow Dinka tribespeople in Khartoum in the Jabarona settlement.

== Journey to the United States ==
Jabarona was filled with Dinka refugees who had fled the fighting in the south of Sudan and were forced to live together in sub-standard conditions. Bok settled among people who were from the Aweil area of North Bahr al Ghazal and began using his Christian name of Francis once again. Bok was quickly arrested by the Sudanese police for telling his friends and neighbors that he was a slave. Slavery in Sudan is a subject that was largely denied by the government in Khartoum and anybody that spoke of it could be arrested or even killed. Bok was interrogated numerous times while he was imprisoned and each time he denied that he was a slave. He was finally released from prison after seven months. Once he was released Bok decided that he must leave Sudan. Through the help of some Dinka tribesman he was able to acquire a Sudanese passport on the black market and obtain a ticket for passage to Cairo.

Upon arriving in Cairo in April 1999, Bok was directed to Sacred Heart Catholic Church. This church was well known among the Dinka in Khartoum as a place of refuge in Cairo. While staying at Sacred Heart, Bok began to learn some English and made important contacts among the Dinka population of Cairo. He also began practicing his Christian faith without fear of reprisal. He eventually moved out of the church compound and into an apartment with other Dinka who were also seeking UN refugee status in order to leave Africa for the United States, Great Britain or Australia.

Bok applied for and received UN refugee status on September 15, 1999, and after several months of waiting, the United States Immigration and Naturalization Service agreed to allow Bok to move to the U.S. He flew from Cairo to New York City on August 13, 1999, and from there he flew to Fargo, North Dakota. His journey was sponsored by Lutheran Social Services and a United Methodist Church; both worked together to provide him an apartment in Fargo and helped him find a job. Bok worked several jobs, making pallets and plastic knobs for the gearshift of cars. He heard of a large population of Dinka in Ames, Iowa, and moved to Ames after several months in Fargo. It was while living in Ames that he was contacted by Charles Jacobs, founder of the American Anti-Slavery Group (AASG) based in Boston, Massachusetts.

== Work as an abolitionist ==
Jesse Sage, associate director of the American Anti-Slavery Group, and Jacobs persuaded Bok to move to Boston to work with the AASG. He was initially hesitant to leave his new friends in Ames, but according to Bok, the people at AASG were persistent. He arrived in Boston on May 14, 2000, AASG helped him find an apartment. A week after moving to Boston, he was invited to speak at a Baptist church in Roxbury and was interviewed by Charles A. Radin of The Boston Globe. Two days after his speech in Roxbury, Bok was asked to meet with supporters of AASG on the steps of the United States Capitol in Washington, D.C. He returned to Washington on September 28, 2000, and became the first escaped slave to speak before the United States Senate Committee on Foreign Relations. Bok was invited to Washington again in 2002 for the signing of the Sudan Peace Act and met with President George W. Bush. It was during this trip to the White House that Bok became the first former slave to meet with a U.S. President since the 19th century.

Bok has spoken at churches and universities throughout the United States and Canada and he has helped launch the American Anti-Slavery Group's website iAbolish.org at a Jane's Addiction concert before an audience of 40,000 on April 28, 2001. Perry Farrell was a key early supporter of the iAbolish movement. Bok has also been honored by the Boston Celtics and was chosen to carry the Olympic Torch past Plymouth Rock prior to the 2002 Winter Olympics. His autobiography, Escape from Slavery: The True Story of My Ten Years in Captivity and My Journey to Freedom in America, was published in 2003 by St. Martin's Press.

Bok currently lives with his wife, Atak, and their two young children, Buk and Dhai, in Kansas. He is now working in the AASG's first extension office in Kansas. He also works with Sudan Sunrise, a Lenexa, Kansas-based organization that seeks to work for peace and unity in Sudan.

== In popular culture ==
Francis Bok's voice is heard on Zero Church, a 2002 album by Suzzy and Maggie Roche.

== See also ==
- Mende Nazer
- Lost Boys of Sudan
- Slavery in Sudan
- List of slaves

== Bibliography ==
- Bok, Francis; Tivnan, Edward (2003). Escape from Slavery: The True Story of My Ten Years in Captivity and My Journey to Freedom in America (1st ed.). New York, New York: St. Martin's Press. ISBN 0-312-30623-7.
