= Anne Bayefsky =

Canadian academic and activist (born 1953)

Anne Bayefsky, born 8 November 1953, is a lawyer, scholar and activist who currently directs the Touro College Institute on Human Rights and the Holocaust. She is a Fox News opinion writer, and an author and editor on several websites.

== Career ==
Bayefsky holds a B.A., M.A. and LL.B. from the University of Toronto and an M.Litt. from Oxford University. She has served as the director of York's Centre for Refugee Studies, project director for the university's Human Rights Treaty Study, member of Canadian delegations to international meetings, such as the UN Human Rights Commissions in 1993–1996, the UN General Assembly in 1984 and 1989, the Vienna World Conference on Human Rights in 1993, and a delegate of the American Society of International Law to the Beijing Fourth World Conference on Women in 1995. She has previously been a Senior Fellow at the Hudson Institute, an American conservative think tank.

Currently, she is director of the Touro College Institute on Human Rights, the senior editor and a board member for the 'Human Rights Voices' online news platform, and an author at 'Eye on the UN', which is run by the Hudson Institute and the Touro College Institute for Human Rights. She also sits on the Board of Advisors of the Jewish Institute for National Security Affairs, a non-profit thinktank focusing on issues of United States and Israel's national security. Her legal expertise is in international, human rights, women's rights, and United Nations law, and covers four decades, beginning at the University of Ottawa in 1981.

Bayefsky has organized and run conferences and meetings in the fields of international relations and human rights for non-profits.

== Views ==
Bayefsky has argued that Ontario's policy of fully funding Roman Catholic schools, while denying full funding to other religious schools, is discriminatory.

Bayefsky speaks out in defense of Israel. She was critical of "the Obama administration's response to Israel's announcement that it will continue to build new homes for its expanding population in occupied territory," calling it "hysterical," and asked, "Given that the United States is supposed to be committed to the parties determining ultimate legal ownership of the land in final status negotiations, what is going on?"

== Awards ==
- 1992: Recipient of the Bora Laskin National Fellowship in Human Rights Research from the Social Sciences and Humanities Research Council of Canada.
- 2002–2004: Lady Davis Fellow at the Hebrew University in Jerusalem
- 1995–1996: Recipient of a MacArthur Foundation grant in Peace and International Cooperation

== Publications ==
- The UN Human Rights Treaty System: Universality at the Crossroads, Transnational Publishers, (softbound), c. 2001; Kluwer Law International (hardbound), c. 2001;
- The UN Human Rights Treaty System in the Twenty-First Century, Kluwer Law International, c. 2000; (co-ed.)
- The UN and the Jews, Commentary Magazine, February 1, 2004.
- Human Rights and Forced Displacement, Martinus Nijhoff Publishers, c. 2000; (ed.)
- Self-Determination in International Law: Quebec and Lessons Learned, Kluwer Law International, c. 2000;
- International Human Rights Law: Use in Canadian Charter of Rights and Freedoms Litigation, Butterworths, c. 1992;
- Canada's Constitution Act 1982 and Amendments: A Documentary History, Volume I and II, McGraw-Hill Ryerson, c. 1989; (ed.)
- Legal Theory Meets Legal Practice, Academic Printing and Publishing, c. 1988; (co-ed.)
- Equality Rights and the Canadian Charter of Rights and Freedoms, Carswell Co. Ltd., c. 1985.

== See also ==
- Israel and the United Nations
- Modern anti-Semitism
