= Sudan Freedom Walk =

On April 5, 2006 Sudan activist and former slave Simon Deng and a band of supporters completed an arduous 300-mile trek on foot from New York City to Washington, D.C. as part of the historic Sudan Freedom Walk. The three-week-long event was Deng's personal protest against the ongoing genocide and slave trade in Sudan, most notably in the nation's western Darfur region, where more than 300,000 civilians had been slaughtered and over 2 million displaced since 2003 alone.

== Political participation ==
The Sudan Freedom Walk came to a close after three weeks with a rally before the steps of the Capitol in Washington, D.C. on the afternoon of April 6, 2006, coinciding with Congressional passage of the Darfur Peace and Accountability Act, which required Sudan to comply with several human rights standards or face sanctions. The event drew an unlikely mix of supporters, including: former Washington Bullets NBA player Manute "The Sudanese Swat" Bol (left), Sen. Hillary Clinton (D-NY), Sen. Sam Brownback (R-KS), House Minority Leader Nancy Pelosi (D-CA), Rep. Michael Capuano (D-MA), Rep. Barbara Lee (D-CA), Rep. Joseph Crowley (D-NY), Rep. Betty McCollum (D-MN), Rep. Chris Van Hollen (D-MD), as well as Walter Fauntroy, former mayor of Washington, and radio talk show host Joe Madison.

== 2010 iteration ==
The Sudan Freedom Walk returned in the Fall of 2010, replicating the first walk of 2006 and advocating for a free and fair vote for Southern Sudanese independence. Simon Deng again led the walk, in partnership with the Darfur Human Rights Organization of the USA. Emmanuel Jal The popular Sudanese artist joined the walk at the Capitol to close the walk on October 7, 2010.
