= World Conference against Racism 2001 =

UN-backed conference

The 2001 World Conference against Racism (WCAR), also known as Durban I, was held at the Durban International Convention Centre in Durban, South Africa, under UN auspices, from 31 August to 8 September 2001.

The conference covered several controversial issues, including redress for transatlantic slavery and the second-class citizenry issue in Palestine-Israel. The language of the final Declaration and Programme of Action produced by the conference was strongly disputed in these areas, both in the preparatory meetings in the months that preceded it and during the conference itself.

Two delegations, the United States and Israel, withdrew from the conference over objections to a draft document equating Zionism with racism. The final Declaration and Programme of Action did not contain the text that the US and Israel had objected to, that text having been voted out by delegates in the days after both countries withdrew.

In parallel to the conference, a separately held NGO Forum also produced a Declaration and Programme of its own, which was not an official Conference document, and contained language relating to Israel that the WCAR had voted to exclude from its Declaration. It was criticized by then United Nations High Commissioner for Human Rights, Mary Robinson, and many others.

The NGO Forum ended in discord. Mary Robinson lost the support of the US in her office of High Commissioner, and many of the potential political aftereffects of the conference were annulled by the September 11, 2001 attacks. The attacks took place just three days after the conference ended, entirely eclipsing it in the news, and significantly affecting international relations and politics. The conference was followed by the 2009 Durban II conference in Geneva, which was boycotted by ten Western countries. A commemorative Durban III conference in September 2011 in New York also drew significant criticism and was boycotted by 14 Western countries.

== Preparations ==
The conference was authorized by United Nations General Assembly Resolution #52/111. Prior to the conference various preparatory meetings (PrepComs) were held in order to identify conference themes and to create initial drafts of the Declaration and Programme of Action. These PrepComs encountered difficulties from the start.

The first problem was the question of what the conference theme was to be. The Western European states, along with the United States, Canada, Australia, New Zealand, and Japan, all wanted the conference objectives to be those given in the authorizing resolution. The Africa Group, the Latin American states, and the Caribbean states wanted the conference objectives to go beyond what was in the resolution, and include items dealing with regional, national, and international measures for compensation for colonialism and slavery.

Prior to the conference, there were also four Regional Conferences, in Strasbourg, Santiago, Dakar, and Tehran.

== The Durban Declaration and Programme of Action ==
The Durban Declaration and Programme of Action were adopted by the governmental delegates attending the Conference at the International Convention Centre.

=== Compensation for colonialism and slavery ===
The issue of compensation for colonialism and slavery is addressed in ¶ 13, ¶ 14, ¶ 15, and ¶ 29 of the Declaration. It was one of the most controversial issues debated at the conference, one that had the potential to derail the entire conference. It was dealt with cleverly in the Declaration, containing rhetoric that satisfied the African bloc, without applying retroactively against the descendants of colonizers the principle of crimes against humanity and without establishing a clear responsibility for reparations on the parts of former colonial states.

The wording of the Declaration struck a delicate balance. Whilst acknowledging historical and contemporary practices of slavery and the slave trade as morally outrageous, and something that would be a crime against humanity today, it did not apply that legal principle to an era before the principle actually existed. The Durban Declaration provides that states recognize "that these historical injustices [slavery, colonialism, genocide, apartheid] have undeniably contributed to the poverty, underdevelopment, marginalization, social exclusion, economic disparities, instability and insecurity that affect many people in different parts of the world, in particular in developing countries." (Article 158)

One of the contentious points at the conference related to the issue was that of Apartheid. During the preparatory processes of the conference, South Africa stressed that it did not want to link compensation to Apartheid. At the Tehran Regional Conference, a paragraph making such a link was inserted by Asian governments. This was deleted at the request of the South African delegation. Linking compensation to Apartheid had the potential to polarize South African society, and produce the same effects as had the controversial land reform programmes in Zimbabwe. Domestic political pressures, and the aim of the South African government to foster reconciliation within the country, made South Africa's position difficult.

The issue of compensation was thus a complex one, that was exacerbated by the President of Senegal, Abdoulaye Wade, calling campaigns to demand compensation for colonialism and slavery "childish".

The earliest point at which the issue of compensation caused problems was during preparations in May 2001, when delegations came to the decision of where to place it on the agenda. At the time, the fourth item on the agenda, out of five items, was "Provision of effective remedies, recourses, redress, compensatory, and other measures, at the national, regional, and international levels". The European Union, represented by Portugal, wanted to place the entire language in brackets. The United States just wanted to place the word "compensatory" in brackets. The African Group, Armenia, and Cuba strongly objected to both proposals, with the African Group stating that if the topic were placed in brackets, they would move for the entire text to be placed in brackets also. In the end, the U.S. proposal was adopted, with the addition of a statement in the report indicating the different perspectives on the exact meaning of those brackets. Western European states discussed informally amongst themselves, outside of the formal preparatory proceedings, what measures and levels of non-cöoperation they might adopt if the issue of compensation gained momentum at Durban itself.

Before the conference, the debate over compensation was seen as dealing with the transatlantic slave trade, and the colonization of Africa by Europeans, thus pitting Western European states (including the former colonial powers of Belgium, France, Germany, Italy, the Netherlands, Portugal, Spain, and the United Kingdom) and the United States against the African Group. The African Group was supported by Asia, Latin America, and the Caribbean.

Prior to the conference, on 3 August 2001, the African Group circulated a Non-Paper on the "Injustices of the Past", containing strong language but a generally moderate position. To this paper the E.U. responded, on 8 August 2001, with a Non-Paper of its own that addressed most but not all, of the issues in the African Group's paper. The United States circulated a Non-Paper as well, but this turned out to be less helpful than the E.U. paper.

The African Group circulated a second Non-Paper on 3 September 2001 that was substantially stronger than its earlier one, with language shifts from "debt cancellation" to "immediate and unconditional cancellation of debt", emphasis upon crimes against humanity, and calls for reparation (something that the earlier paper had not included in part because of a U.S. demand, made at a preparatory meeting in Geneva, that such language be excluded from the text).

Several members of the African Group openly opposed calling for reparations. President Wade stated "We still suffer the effects of slavery and colonialism, and that cannot be evaluated in monetary terms. I find that not only absurd, but insulting." Similarly, South Africa was more interested in devoting time and effort to more pragmatic ends, such as Western aid for the Millennium Africa Recovery Programme, which would be more palatable to the U.S. and the E.U.

A consensus on the reparations issue was reached by late August 2001. On 24 August, President of the United States George W. Bush announced in a press conference that "the reparations issue has been solved — at least the last information I had was that the issue has … looks like it has been resolved", albeit that news media at the time failed to realize the significance of the comment. The U.S. walked out of the conference a few weeks later.

=== Zionism ===
==== Draft text prior to the conference ====
During preparatory meetings in Geneva, text that linked Zionism to racism was placed in brackets, with the expectation that it would be replaced by text that referred to violations of the rights of Palestinians. The U.S. had already threatened to boycott the conference should the conference draft documents include text that could be in any way interpreted as linking Zionism to racism. Mary Robinson had also said that regional political conflicts should not be imposed upon the agenda of the conference. The Australian, the Canadian, and some European delegations shared the U.S. view.

The Arab position was stated by the Secretary-General of the Arab League, Amr Moussa: "Israel's racist actions against the Palestinian people have to be dealt with in an international conference that aims to eradicate racism. Arab countries are not expecting the Durban conference to be a venue for dealing with the Arab- Israeli peace process, but they certainly expect that the Israeli racist practices against the Palestinian people will not be overlooked."

The Arab delegates were not insistent upon language that specifically equated Zionism with racism. It had been suggested that they were trying to revive United Nations General Assembly Resolution 3379 (issued 1975, annulled 1991) which stated that "Zionism is a form of racism." Their position was that they were, rather, trying to underline that the actions being committed by Israel against Palestinians were racist.

This stance was in part influenced by the U.S. threat of boycott, which would have made it impractical to insist upon harsh language condemning Israel or equating the suffering of the Palestinians with that of Holocaust victims. According to one Arab diplomat, no Arab state except for Syria had insisted upon any language linking Israel to racist practices.

At the start of the Geneva meeting, the text had been presented that comprised six bracketed paragraphs dealing with "Zionist racist practices", including an appeal for Israel "to revise its legislation based on racial or religious discrimination such as the law of return and all the policies of an occupying power which prevent the Palestinian refugees and displaced persons from returning to their homes and properties", and a suggestion for the need "to bring the foreign occupation of Jerusalem by Israel together with all its racist practices to an end".

By the end of the meeting, all of this text had either been removed or toned down. One such phrase removed was a mention of "holocausts" suffered by other peoples, which had been seen as an affront to the memory of the Jewish victims of the Nazi holocaust. South African diplomats had already told Arab and Muslim countries that they would have to offer text that could describe the current situation without using such language as "ethnic cleansing practices against Palestinians".

Nonetheless, the United States, objecting to the remaining text, decided to send a low-level delegation, headed by Ambassador Michael Southwick, to the Conference, rather than have United States Secretary of State Colin Powell attend himself. German officials criticized this decision, and the United States Congressional Black Caucus urged him to attend. The Anti-Defamation League urged him to stay away.

==== Withdrawal by U.S. and Israel ====
On 3 September 2001, after four days of deadlocked negotiations that did not reach agreement on language, the United States and Israeli delegations withdrew from the conference. Both United States Secretary of State Colin Powell and Foreign Affairs Minister of Israel Shimon Peres stated that this was done with regret.

The low-level U.S. delegation had kept a low profile throughout conference proceedings until that point, with delegates working quietly in sub-committee meetings, without (unlike in earlier conferences) giving news briefings or off the record statements to journalists, to change the text of the draft declaration, to make it less forceful and less specific against Israel, and to bring it into line with U.S. foreign policy goals with respect to the International Criminal Court (see United States and the International Criminal Court) by removing language that strengthened the ICC.

The draft documents had stated "deep concern" at the "increase of racist practices of Zionism and anti-Semitism" and talked of the emergence of "movements based on racism and discriminatory ideas, in particular the Zionist movement, which is based on racial superiority". Alternative proposals, which the U.S. had supported, from Norway, acting as a mediator, and Canada were rejected by Israel.

Despite Colin Powell's denunciation of the "hateful language" that "singles out only one country in the world, Israel, for censure and abuse" in the draft text and U.S. delegate Tom Lantos's statement that the conference had been "wrecked by Arab and Islamic extremists", some saw the U.S. delegation's withdrawal as not being entirely related to the language on Israel, but attributed it also, in part, to a reluctance on the part of the U.S. to address the issue of slavery.

The withdrawal of the U.S. and Israel was taken as a warning by many delegates that there was a strong possibility of Canada and the E.U. states withdrawing as well if no compromise was reached. Several reports had the Europeans staying on solely in order to help South Africa salvage the Conference. After the withdrawal, senior conference officials became highly involved in the rewriting of the Declaration — something that critics maintained they should have also been doing before that point.

==== Final text and subsequent reaction ====
In the end, the Conference delegates voted to reject the language that implicitly accused Israel of racism, and the document actually published contained no such language.

Several countries were unhappy with the final text's approach to the subject, but all for different reasons. Syria and Iran were unhappy because their demands for the language about racism and Israel had been rejected by the Conference, the latter continuing its insistence that Israel was a racist state. Australia was unhappy with the process, observing that "far too much of the time at the conference [had been] consumed by bitter divisive exchanges on issues which have done nothing to advance the cause of combating racism". Canada was also unhappy.

The language of the final text was carefully drafted for balance. The word "diaspora" is used four times, and solely to refer to the African Diaspora. The document is at pains to maintain a cohesive identity for everyone of African heritage as a victim of slavery, even including those who may have more European than African ancestors. The "victim" or "victims" of racism and slavery (the two words occurring 90 times in the document) are defined in only the most general geographic terms. The word "Jewish" is only used once, alongside "Muslim" and "Arab", and "anti-Semitism" is only used twice, once alongside its assumed counterpart of "Islamophobia" and once alongside "anti-Arabism". The difficulty that this generates is that it is politically impossible to act when the 219 calls for action in the Programme are couched in such generalities that only the "countless human beings" that the document explicitly talks of can be identified.

== The NGO Forum Declaration ==
The NGO Forum ran separately from the main conference in the nearby Kingsmead Stadium in Durban, from 28 August to 1 September. It consisted of 3,000 NGOs, attended by 8,000 representatives. The declaration adopted by the NGO Forum was not an official document of the conference.

The Forum's proceedings were highly disorganized, with several NGO delegates walking out of the Forum, to the jeers of other delegates, and ended in discord. The NGO Forum's declaration described Israel as a "racist, apartheid state" that was guilty of "racist crimes including war crimes, acts of genocide and ethnic cleansing". The document was not intended to be presented to the Conference, although a copy of it was intended to be handed over, as a symbolic gesture, to the Conference secretary-general, Mary Robinson, at the conclusion of the Forum. Robinson refused to accept the document, citing concerns over its language. In a later interview she said of the whole conference that "there was horrible anti-Semitism present — particularly in some of the NGO discussions. A number people said they've never been so hurt or so harassed or been so blatantly faced with an anti-Semitism."

Critics described the description of Israel as apartheid as the "Durban Strategy". They claim that this comparison was made with the intention of causing and encouraging divestment from and boycott of Israel.

The NGO Forum was attended by U.S. NGOs, with financial support from the Rockefeller Foundation, the MacArthur Foundation, and the Charles Stewart Mott Foundation. The Ford Foundation provided USD10 million in support to the WCAR and the NGO Forum. These NGOs provided research assistance at the Forum and helped to develop declarations and resolutions that dealt with the issue of compensation for slavery.

The resolutions adopted by the Forum dealing with reparations for slavery dealt only with the transatlantic slave trade and did not mention the traffic in African slaves to Islamic lands in the Middle East. The Forum also called upon the United States to ratify all major human rights treaties that had already been ratified.

One such treaty was the UN Convention on the Elimination of Racial Discrimination (CERD), which the U.S. had ratified in 1994, but (per the Supremacy Clause of Article Six of the United States Constitution, which does not permit treaties to override the Constitution) had attached a reservation that its ratification did not accept treaty requirements that were incompatible with the Constitution of the United States. The NGOs, including Human Rights Watch and Amnesty International, demanded that U.S. drop its reservations and "comply" with the treaty. The U.S. Department of State had noted specifically that CERD's restrictions on freedom of speech and freedom of assembly were incompatible with the First Amendment to the Constitution of the United States. The United States was far from the only such country to do so, however. Incompatibility of the treaty with national constitutions, including the freedoms of assembly and speech guaranteed by those constitutions, is also noted by Antigua and Barbuda, the Bahamas, Barbados, France, Guyana, Jamaica, Japan, Nepal, Papua New Guinea, Switzerland, and Thailand. Several, including France, Ireland, Italy, Japan, Malta, Monaco, Nepal, the United Kingdom, note that they consider the provisions of the treaty to be restricted by and subject to the freedoms of speech and assembly set forth in the Universal Declaration of Human Rights.

According to John Font, in order to comply with the interpretation of CERD created by the NGOs at the Forum, the United States would have to "turn its political and economic system, together with their underlying principles, upside down — abandoning the free speech guarantees of the Constitution, bypassing federalism, and ignoring the very concept of majority rule since practically nothing in the NGO agenda is supported by the [U.S.] electorate".

Tom Lantos assigns the blame for the withdrawal of the U.S. in part to the radicalism of many of the NGOs at the NGO Forum, to an inadequate response thereto by U.S.-based NGOs, and to the reluctance of the U.S.'s European allies to take a strong stand.

== Aftermath ==
The Conference was largely overshadowed in the news and in international affairs by the September 11, 2001 attacks, which occurred 3 days after the Conference ended.

=== Mary Robinson's tenure as United Nations High Commissioner for Human Rights ===
As a consequence of the Conference, the United States did not support the continuation of Mary Robinson as United Nations High Commissioner for Human Rights, where once U.S. President Bill Clinton had called her a "splendid choice" for the post and the U.S. had considered her its favorite candidate for the job. She stepped down from the post in September 2002.

Many faults were attributed to Ms. Robinson, with a cumulative effect on the U.S. position. Some people stated that she lacked mediation and bureaucratic experience, and thus was unable to resolve sensitive issues at the Conference. News reports attributed her differences with the U.S. to four things: First, her views on the Israeli–Palestinian conflict differed from U.S. policy. Second, the U.S. did not approve of the detached way in which she acted as secretary-general to the Conference. Third, she had openly criticized the U.S. on various matters including the treatment of prisoners at Camp X-Ray, the "unsigning" of the Rome Statute of the International Criminal Court by the U.S., and the administration of capital punishment in the United States. Fourth, she had opposed U.S. calls to reform the election process of the United Nations Commission on Human Rights.

Tom Lantos himself did not assign sole or even primary blame to Robinson for the breakdown of U.S. relations with the conference. That he assigned to the NGOs, as aforementioned, and to the member states of the Organisation of the Islamic Conference. Moreover, several people have defended Robinson's secretary-generalship of the conference.

=== NGO repudiations of the NGO Forum's Declaration ===
Several NGOs, including Human Rights Watch, Amnesty International, and the Lawyers Committee for Human Rights, disassociated themselves from the language of the NGO Forum's Declaration that dealt with Israel and with Jews. The Palestinian Solidarity Committee of South Africa reportedly distributed copies of the antisemitic forgery The Protocols of the Elders of Zion.

=== Followups ===
It seems unlikely to analysts that the United States will support another WCAR. However, the Declaration and Programme of Action did make provision for follow-up mechanisms. Mary Robinson stated in her closing address that the Conference was intended to be a beginning, not an end. Dr. Manning Marable, of Columbia University in New York, pointed out that one of the objectives of the Conference was to increase coordination in human rights activities, and to strengthen networks amongst those combating racism; and as such the actions of governments in response to the Conference are not the sole intended outcomes — actions by civil society and non-governmental agencies are also required.

One such follow-up provision is for national governments to provide the Office of the United Nations High Commissioner for Human Rights with reports on their actions towards implementing the recommendations in the Programme of Action. Another is for the Secretary General of the United Nations to appoint an expert body with the remit of following up on implementation. A third is a call for the establishment of a database of practical means for addressing racism, racial discrimination, and related intolerance.

A Permanent Memorial Trust Fund has also been established for the creation of a memorial at the New York United Nations site. The sculpture, to be titled the Permanent Memorial to the Victims of Slavery and the Transatlantic Slave Trade, or the UN Slavery Memorial, is set to be completed in 2012.

By resolution #2002/68 of the United Nations Commission on Human Rights an Intergovernmental Working Group on the Effective Implementation of the Durban Declaration and Programme of Action was established, which held its first meeting in January 2003 and which meets on an annual basis.

In resolution #61/149 of the United Nations General Assembly, passed in 2006, a Durban Review Conference was called. The conference took place in 2009, however, a number of countries expressed concern as a result of the 2001 conference. Some countries, including Australia, Canada, Germany, Israel, Italy, the Netherlands, New Zealand, Poland, and the United States, boycotted the conference. The Czech Republic discontinued its attendance on the first day, and twenty-three other European Union countries sent low-level delegations. In an 18 April 2009 speech, President Barack Obama announced the United States' boycott of the 2009 Durban Review Conference, reaffirming the country's opposition to language that was anti-Israel and anti-Western.

The United Kingdom and other European countries remain undecided. On 17 February 2009, Foreign Office Minister Lord Malloch-Brown said: "If we can’t go forward now, we will withdraw. I was at the first conference. I have never seen such a disgraceful event in quite a long international life."

=== Influence ===
The Institute for Global Jewish Affairs was founded, in part, as a response to the antisemitism of the Durban conference.

Bernard-Henri Lévy credits the conference with being one of the inspirations for his book, Left in Dark Times: A Stand Against the New Barbarism.

== See also ==
- Israel and apartheid

== Notes and references ==
=== Bibliography ===
- Schechter, Michael G. (7 May 2009). United Nations Global Conferences. Routledge. ISBN 978-1-135-28274-5.
