= Simon Deng =

South Sudanese-American human rights activist

Simon Aban Deng
- Born: 1959 (age 66–67); Sudan
- Occupations: Human rights activist Author; Abolitionist
- Years active: 1993-present
- Known for: Sudan Freedom Walk, Anti Slavery Campaign, human rights in Sudan
- Awards: ADL’s Heroes Against Hate (2006) and U.N. Watch’s Freedom Award (2011)

Simon Aban Deng is a South Sudanese-American human rights activist living in the United States. A survivor of child slavery, Deng's activism primarily focuses on slavery in Sudan and on South Sudanese self-determination.

== Biography ==
Deng was born in a Shilluk village in southern Sudan. In 1969, at the age of nine, his village was "raided by Arab troops in the pay of Khartoum". Deng and his family escaped and relocated to a refugee camp in Makkal. There, he was abducted by a neighbor and brought north alongside three other children. In the north, he was "given to an Arab family as a 'gift'".

During his time as a slave, Deng was responsible for domestic chores, such as fetching water. He remembers being punished for not responding loudly enough, beaten by groups of other children, and having nothing but "patience [...] and my faith" as friends. He was forced to say yes to everything, including torture, and remembers times when "the only thing I could do was ask for mercy [...] and mercy was not always there". Deng was told he would be treated more humanely if he converted to Islam, took an Arab name, and agreed to become the family's son; he refused on all three counts.

In 1972, after three and a half years of enslavement, Deng saw three men at a market in Kosti, one of whom had traditional Shilluk scarification. He approached the group and told them his story. The men knew someone from Deng's village, and agreed to help him plan his escape. After a few weeks, Deng boarded a steamer and returned home to his family. After escaping slavery, he underwent scarification to ensure he would always have his identity.

Deng and his family later moved to Khartoum, where his house was 50 yards from the Nile. Deng learned to swim in the river, after being rejected from local pools. He eventually became a long-distance swimmer.

Deng traveled to the United States on a tourist visa in 1990, and was able to successfully apply for political asylum. He now travels the country as a speaker, focusing on education and the anti-slavery movement. He works as a lifeguard at Coney Island.

== Activism ==
In 1993, after settling in the United States, Deng worked as an activist to raise awareness for slavery in Sudan. Through his efforts, he began a partnership with Charles Jacobs to help assist Christian Solidarity International in freeing Sudanese slaves. In 1998, he began telling his own personal story of enslavement.

In the early 2000s, Deng became known for his outspoken criticisms of the then-Omar al-Bashir government in Khartoum. He organized protests in New York and Washington, D.C. against the civil war in southern Sudan, particularly the kidnappings of men, women and children by militia groups allied to the Khartoum government. He also denounced human rights violations against the war victims.

He continued his advocacy when the war in Darfur began in 2003, linking the conflict with the earlier South Sudanese conflict and drawing parallels between them despite their different origins and motives. After the signing of the 2005 CPA agreements between the SPLA and Khartoum government, Deng became an advocate for South Sudanese independence, seeing it as an outcome to the decades long South Sudanese struggle for peace, human rights and self determination.

His anti-war protests shifted to anti-slavery campaigns, as he spent the next decade sharing his story of being a child slave in the 1960s. He and fellow activist, abolitionist and author Francis Bok toured the United States and Europe, sharing their stories of slavery and calling for an end to war in Sudan.

Deng became a prominent speaker with the American Anti Slavery Group and testified at the Geneva Summit for Human Rights and Democracy in 2010.

In 2012, Deng visited Israel to speak out against proposed deportations of South Sudanese asylum seekers.

In December 2023, Deng led a solidarity walk from Tel Aviv to Jerusalem to "illustrate the solidarity of the South Sudanese and many Africans with the Jewish people and the State of Israel". He also referenced Israel's assistance of South Sudanese rebels during the first Sudanese Civil War. While in Israel, he also met with families of the hostages taken on October 7, 2023. Deng expressed concerns about aggressions by jihadists toward Jews and South Sudanese, drawing a parallel between the two.

=== Sudan Freedom Walk ===
The Sudan Freedom Walk can refer to one of several such events organized by Simon Deng used to raise awareness of human rights issues in Sudan.

- Sudan Freedom Walk, April 2006, New York City, New York to Washington, D.C., United States of America
- Second Sudan Freedom Walk, December 2006, Brussels, Belgium to The Hague, Netherlands
- Sudan Freedom Walk Chicago, May 2007, Chicago, Illinois, United States of America
- Sudan Freedom Walk, 2010, New York City to Washington, D.C.
  - Focused on raising public support for the 2011 South Sudanese independence referendum

== Personal life ==
Deng is a Christian. As of 2012, he was living in New York City. He had become an American citizen by 2006.
