= NBA blocks leaders =

NBA blocks leader may refer to:

- List of National Basketball Association annual blocks leaders
- List of National Basketball Association career blocks leaders
- List of National Basketball Association career playoff blocks leaders
- List of National Basketball Association single-game blocks leaders
