= List of NBA single-season blocks per game leaders =

NBA Statistics Page

This list exhibits the National Basketball Association's top single-season blocks averages based on at least 70 games played or 100 blocks. The NBA did not record blocks until 1973–74 NBA season.

== List ==
^	Active NBA player
*	Inducted into the Naismith Memorial Basketball Hall of Fame

Statistics accurate as of the 2025–26 NBA season.

Rank	Season	Player	Team	Games	Blocks	BPG
1	1984–85	Mark Eaton	Utah Jazz	82	456	5.56
2	1985–86	Manute Bol	Washington Bullets	80	397	4.96
3	1973–74	Elmore Smith	Los Angeles Lakers	81	393	4.85
4	1985–86	Mark Eaton (2)	Utah Jazz	80	369	4.61
5	1989–90	Hakeem Olajuwon*	Houston Rockets	82	376	4.59
6	1995–96	Dikembe Mutombo*	Denver Nuggets	74	332	4.49
7	1991–92	David Robinson*	San Antonio Spurs	68	305	4.49
8	1991–92	Hakeem Olajuwon* (2)	Houston Rockets	70	304	4.34
9	1988–89	Manute Bol (2)	Golden State Warriors	80	345	4.31
10	1982–83	Tree Rollins	Atlanta Hawks	80	343	4.29
11	1983–84	Mark Eaton (3)	Utah Jazz	82	351	4.28
12	1992–93	Hakeem Olajuwon* (3)	Houston Rockets	82	342	4.17
13	1975–76	Kareem Abdul-Jabbar*	Los Angeles Lakers	82	338	4.12
14	1993–94	Dikembe Mutombo* (2)	Denver Nuggets	82	336	4.10
15	1986–87	Mark Eaton (4)	Utah Jazz	79	321	4.06
16	1989–90	Patrick Ewing*	New York Knicks	82	327	3.99
17	1978–79	Kareem Abdul-Jabbar* (2)	Los Angeles Lakers	80	316	3.95
18	1990–91	Hakeem Olajuwon* (4)	Houston Rockets	56	221	3.95
19	1994–95	Dikembe Mutombo* (3)	Denver Nuggets	82	321	3.91
20	1999–00	Alonzo Mourning*	Miami Heat	46	180	3.91
21	1990–91	David Robinson* (2)	San Antonio Spurs	82	320	3.90
22	1989–90	David Robinson* (3)	San Antonio Spurs	82	319	3.89
23	1988–89	Mark Eaton (5)	Utah Jazz	82	315	3.84
24	2024–25	Victor Wembanyama^	San Antonio Spurs	46	176	3.83
25	2000–01	Theo Ratliff	Philadelphia 76ers	50	187	3.74

== See also ==
- National Basketball Association
- List of NBA annual blocks leaders
