= List of NBA annual blocks leaders =

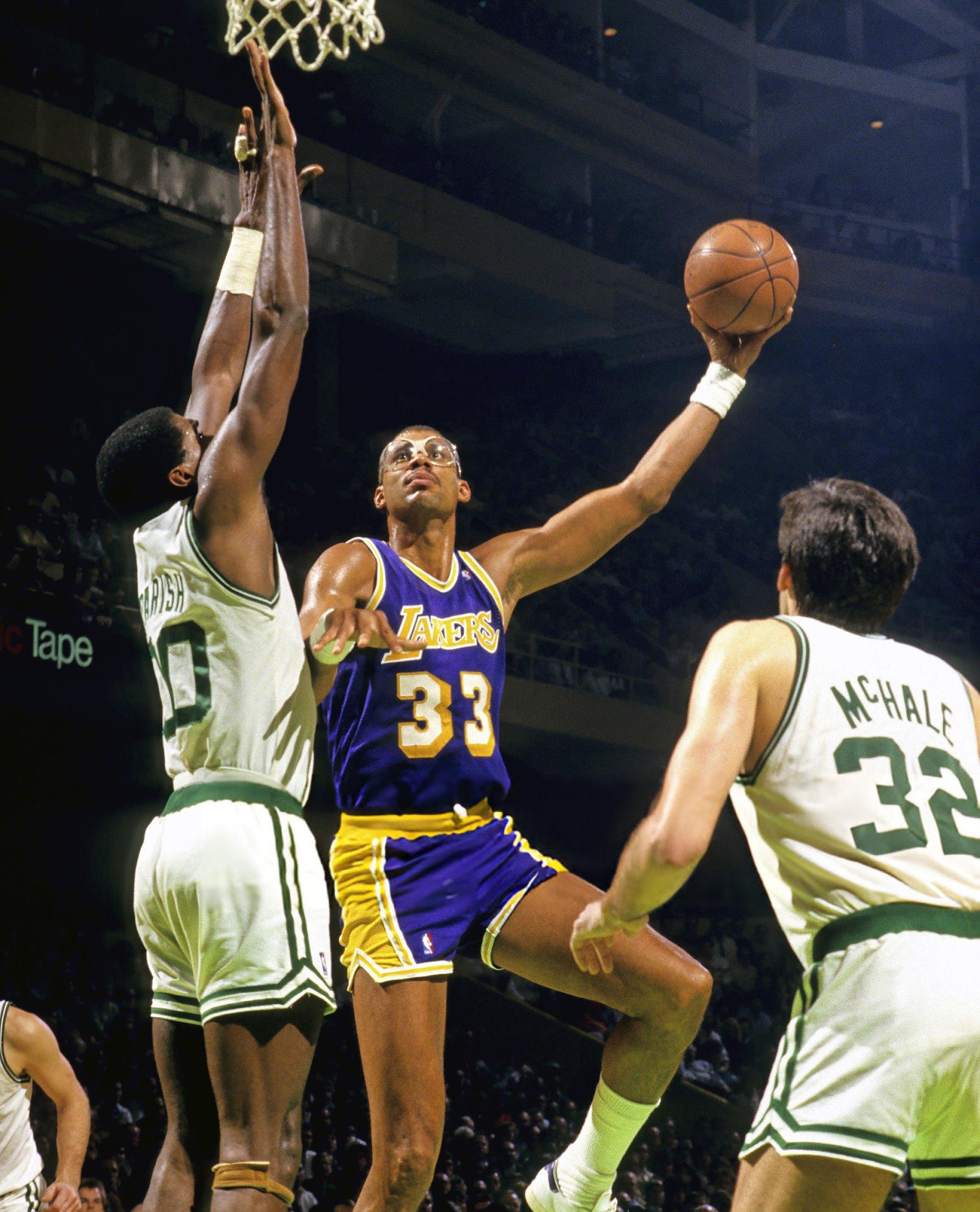
Kareem Abdul-Jabbar (pictured) along with Mark Eaton and Marcus Camby each won four block titles, the most in NBA history

In basketball, a blocked shot occurs when a defender deflects or stops a field goal attempt without committing a foul. The National Basketball Association's (NBA) block title is awarded to the player with the highest blocks per game average in a given season. The block title was first recognized in the 1973–74 NBA season when statistics on blocks were first compiled. To qualify for the blocks title, a player must appear in at least 70 percent of the season's games (58 games in typical 82-game season). However, a player who appears in fewer than the minimum games may qualify as an annual blocks leader if his block total would have still given him the highest average, even had he appeared in the extra required games and recorded 0 blocks in these extra games. This has been the requirement since the 2013–14 NBA season.

Mark Eaton holds the all-time records for total blocks (456) and blocks per game (5.56) in a season; both achieved in the 1984–85 NBA season. Manute Bol holds the rookie records for total blocks and blocks per game when he had 397 and averaged 5.0 in the 1985–86 NBA season. Victor Wembanyama had the highest season block average (3.08) in the 2025–26 NBA season.

Kareem Abdul-Jabbar, Mark Eaton and Marcus Camby all won the most block titles, with four. George T. Johnson, Manute Bol, Hakeem Olajuwon, Dikembe Mutombo, Alonzo Mourning, Theo Ratliff, Dwight Howard, Anthony Davis, Serge Ibaka, Myles Turner, Jaren Jackson Jr. and Victor Wembanyama have also won the title more than once. Dikembe Mutombo, Marcus Camby, and Victor Wembanyama have also won the most consecutive block titles, with three. Two players have won both the block title and the NBA championship in the same season: Bill Walton in 1977 with the Portland Trail Blazers and Kareem Abdul-Jabbar in 1980 with the Los Angeles Lakers.

== Key ==
| ^ | | Denotes player who is still active in the NBA | | | |
| * | | Inducted into the Naismith Memorial Basketball Hall of Fame | | | |
| † | | Not yet eligible for Hall of Fame consideration (Note: A player is not eligible for induction into the Naismith Memorial Basketball Hall of Fame until he has been fully retired for two calendar years.) | | | |
| § | | 1st time eligible for Hall of Fame in 2025 | | | |
| ‡ | | Denotes player who won the Defensive Player of the Year award that year | | | |
| Player (X) | | Denotes the number of times the player had been the blocks leader up to and including that season | | | |
| G | Guard | F | Forward | C | Center |

== Annual leaders ==
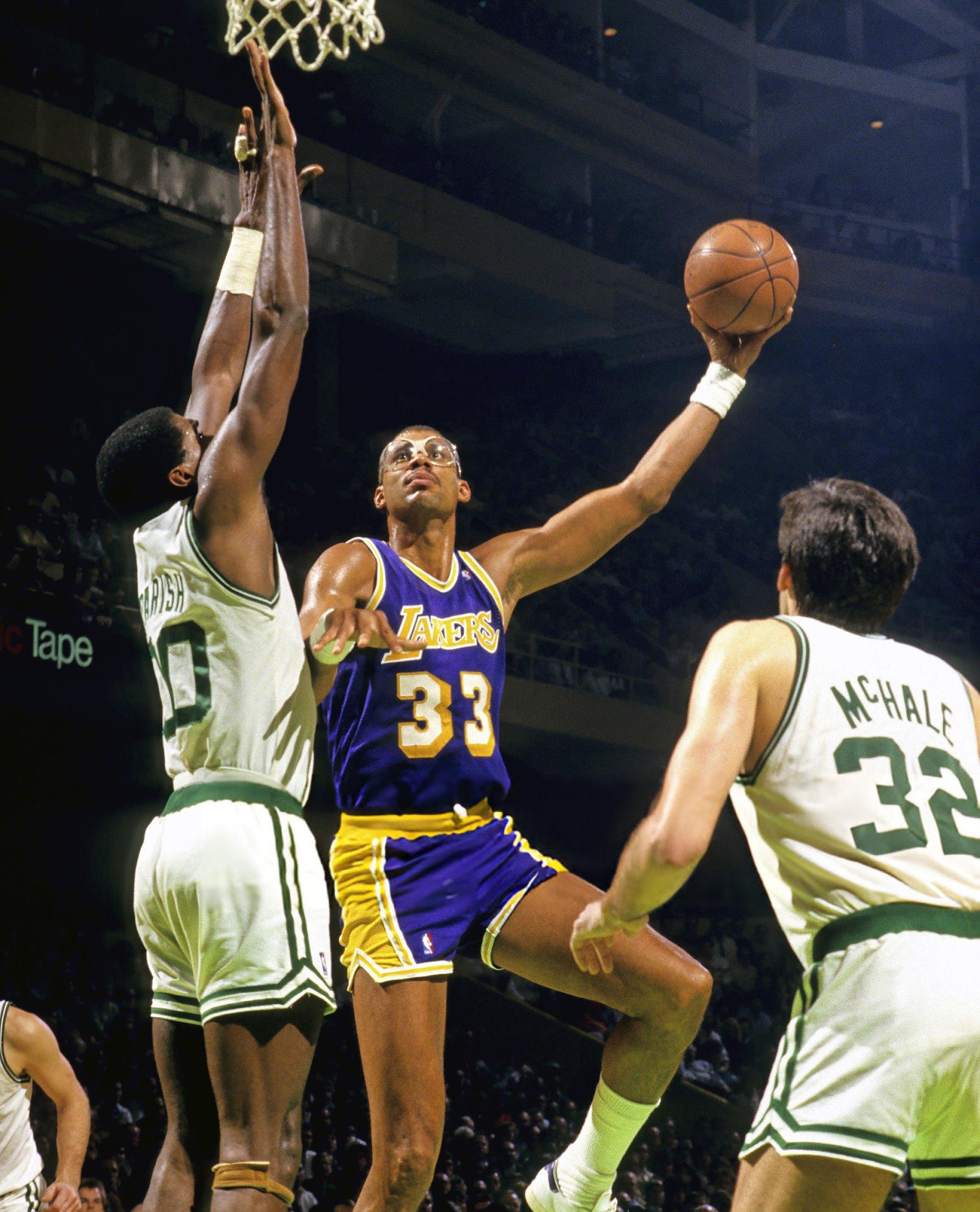
Kareem Abdul Jabbar won four times in (1975, 1976, 1979, 1980).

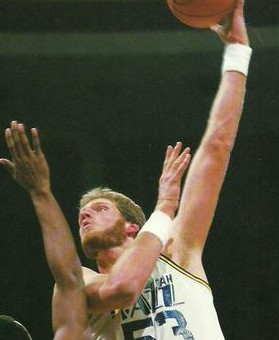
Mark Eaton won four times in (1984, 1985, 1987, 1988).

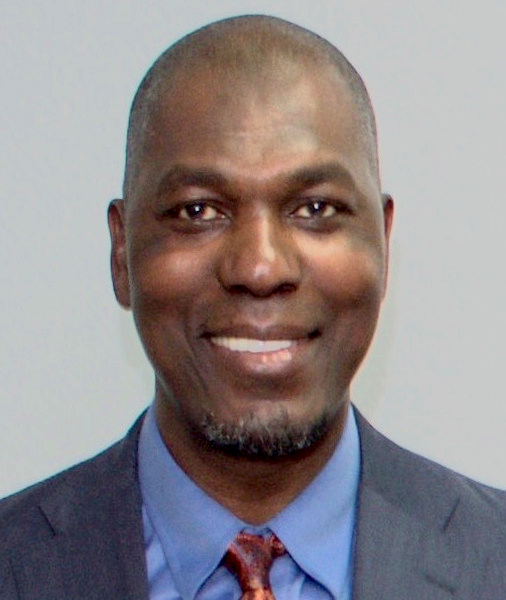
Hakeem Olajuwon won three times in (1990, 1991, 1993).

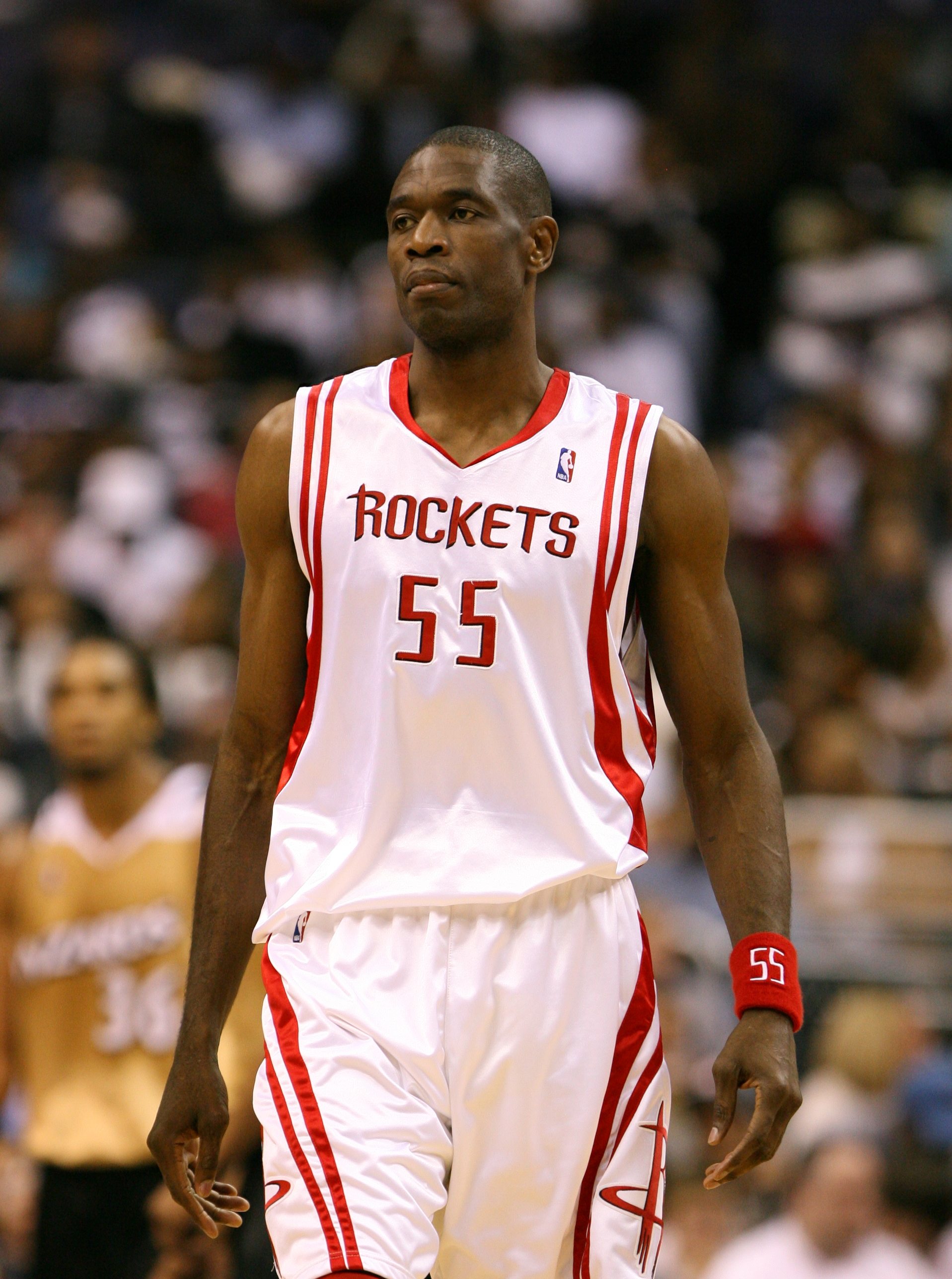
Dikembe Mutombo won three times in (1994, 1995, 1996).

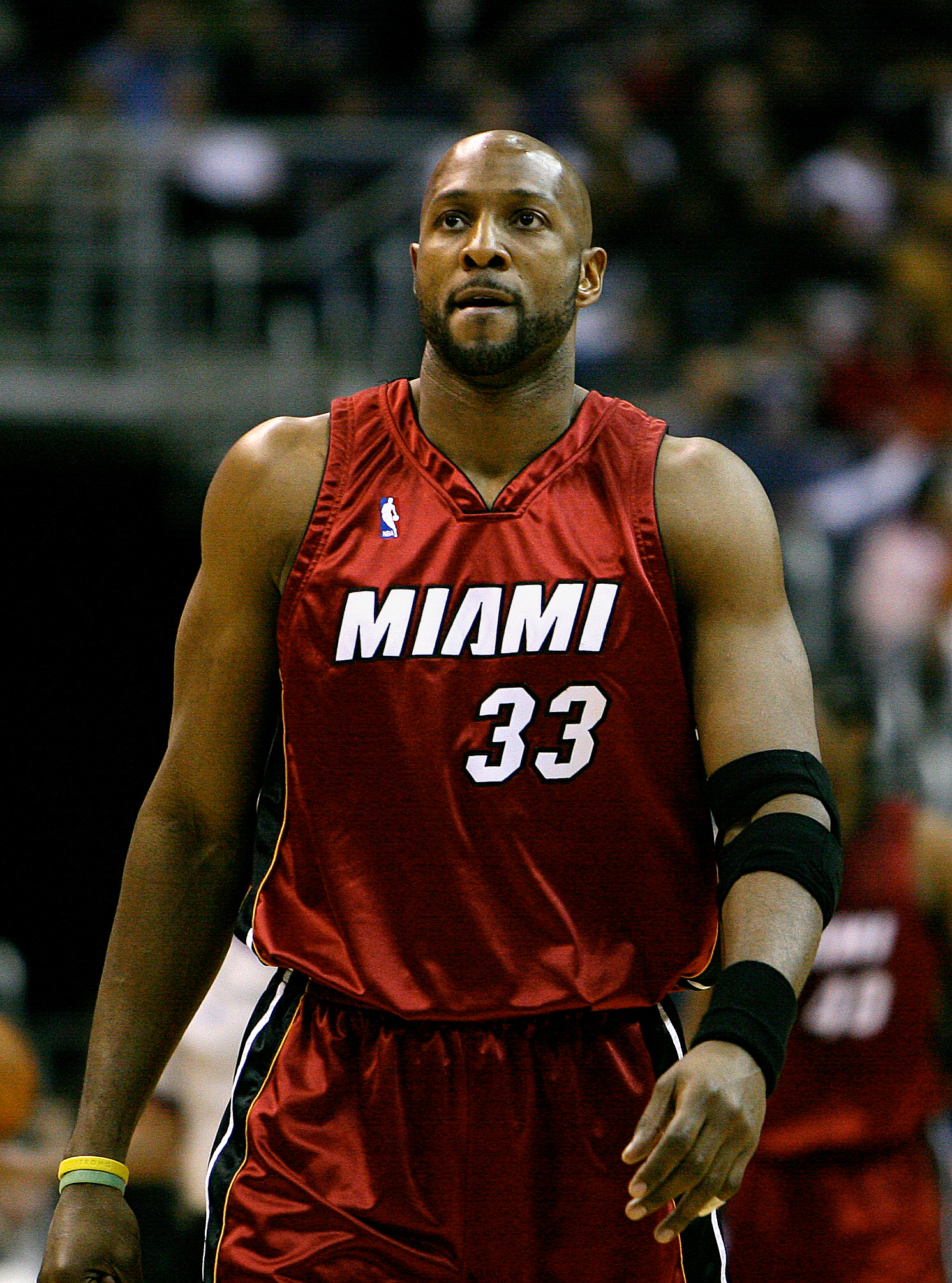
Alonzo Mourning won two times in (1999, 2000).

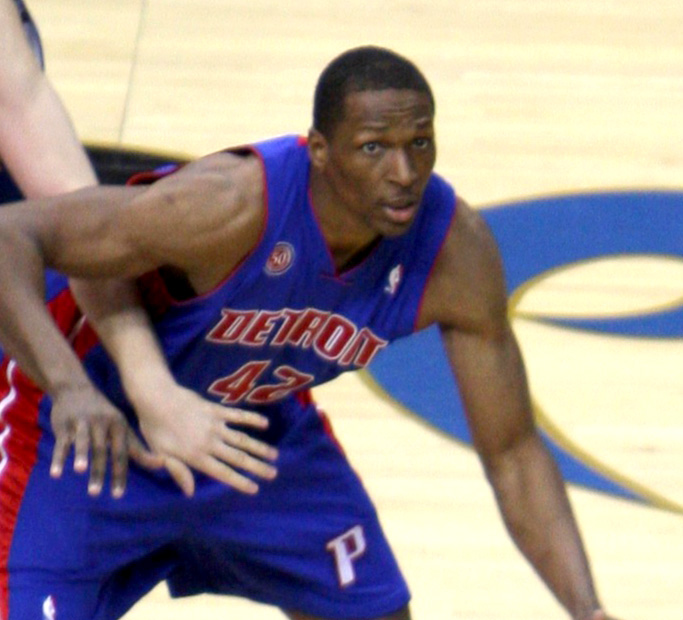
Theo Ratliff won three times in (2001, 2003, 2004).

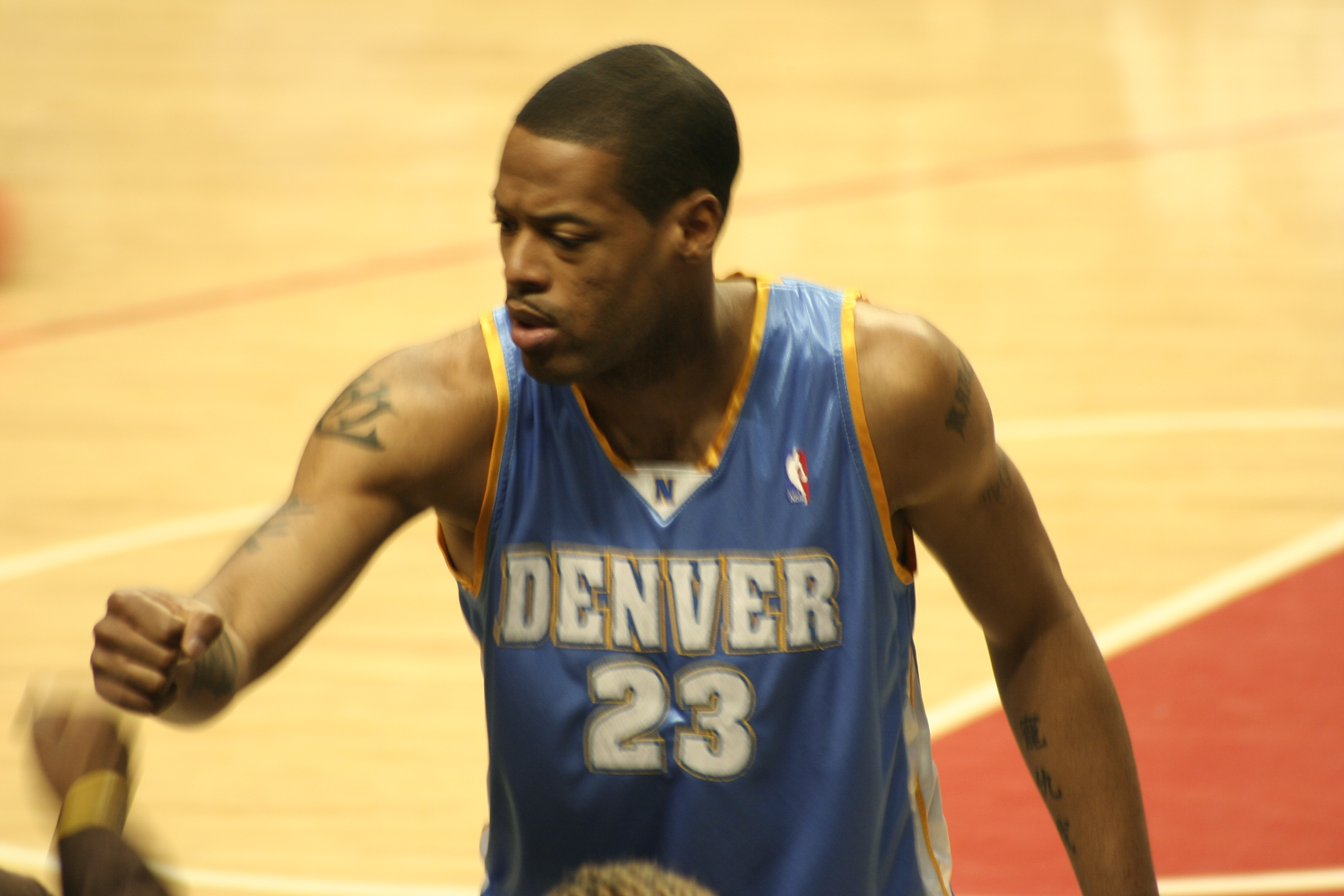
Marcus Camby won four times in (1998, 2006, 2007, 2008).

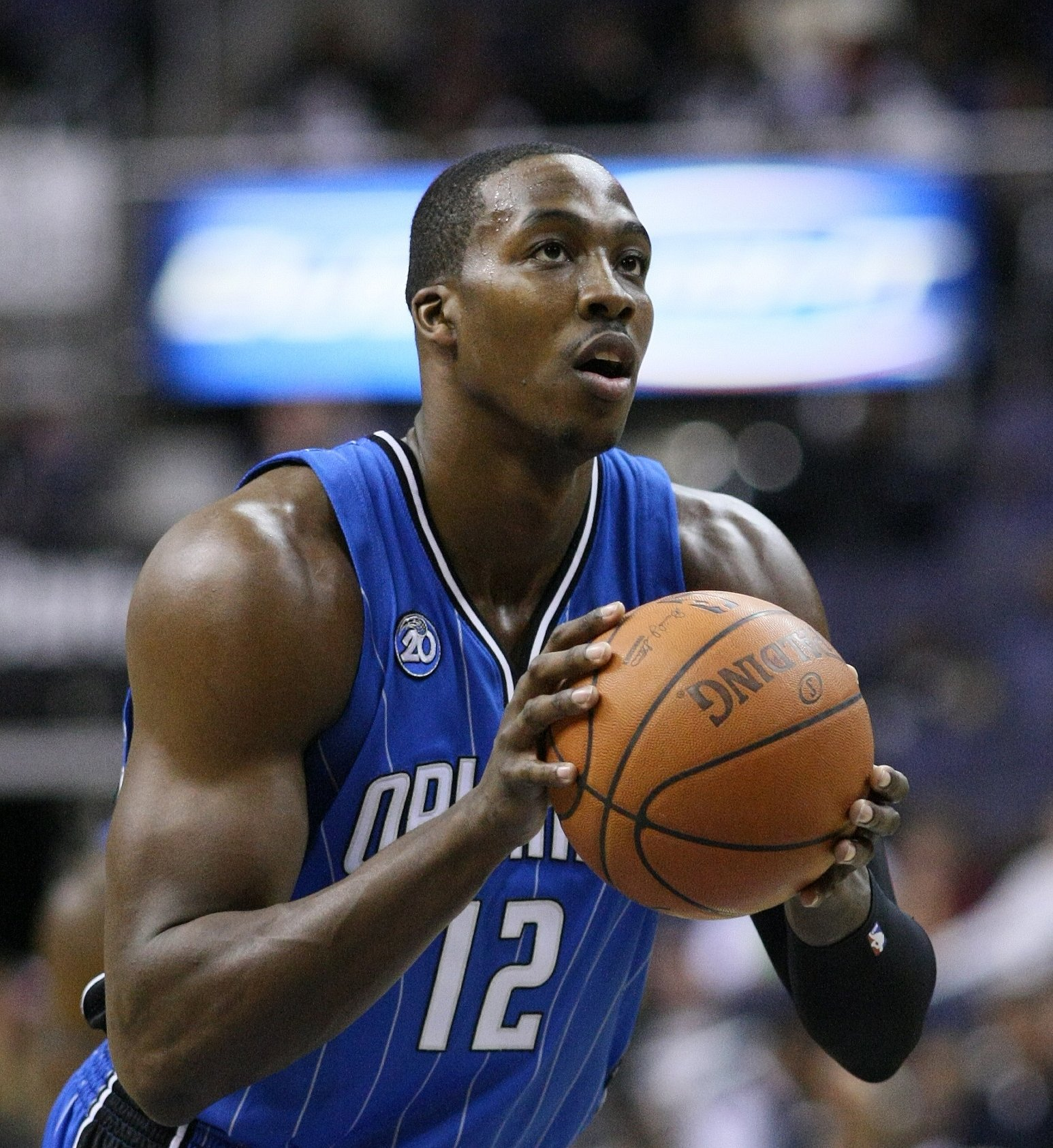
Dwight Howard won two times in (2009, 2010).

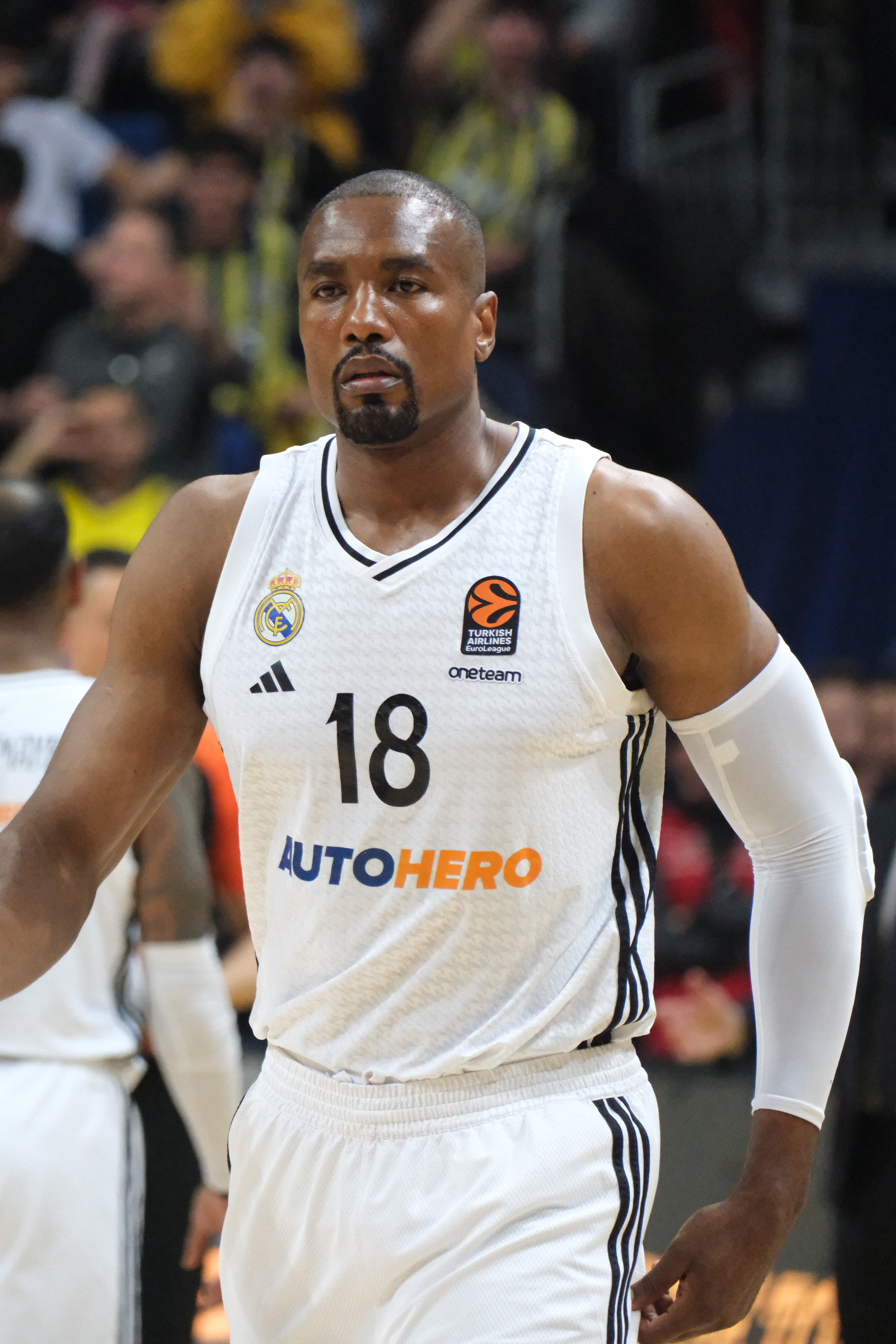
Serge Ibaka won two times in (2012, 2013).

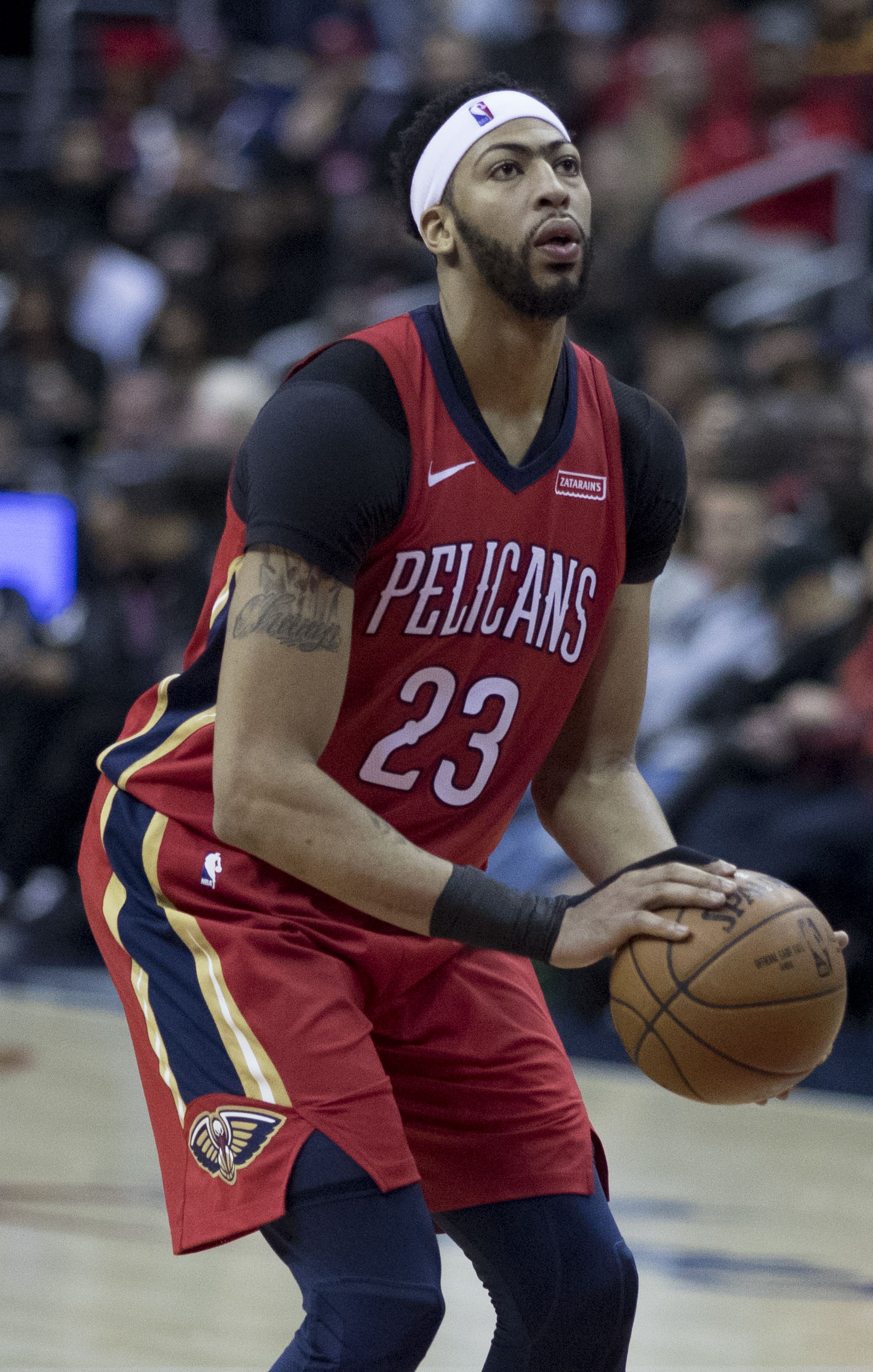
Anthony Davis won three times in (2014, 2015, 2018).

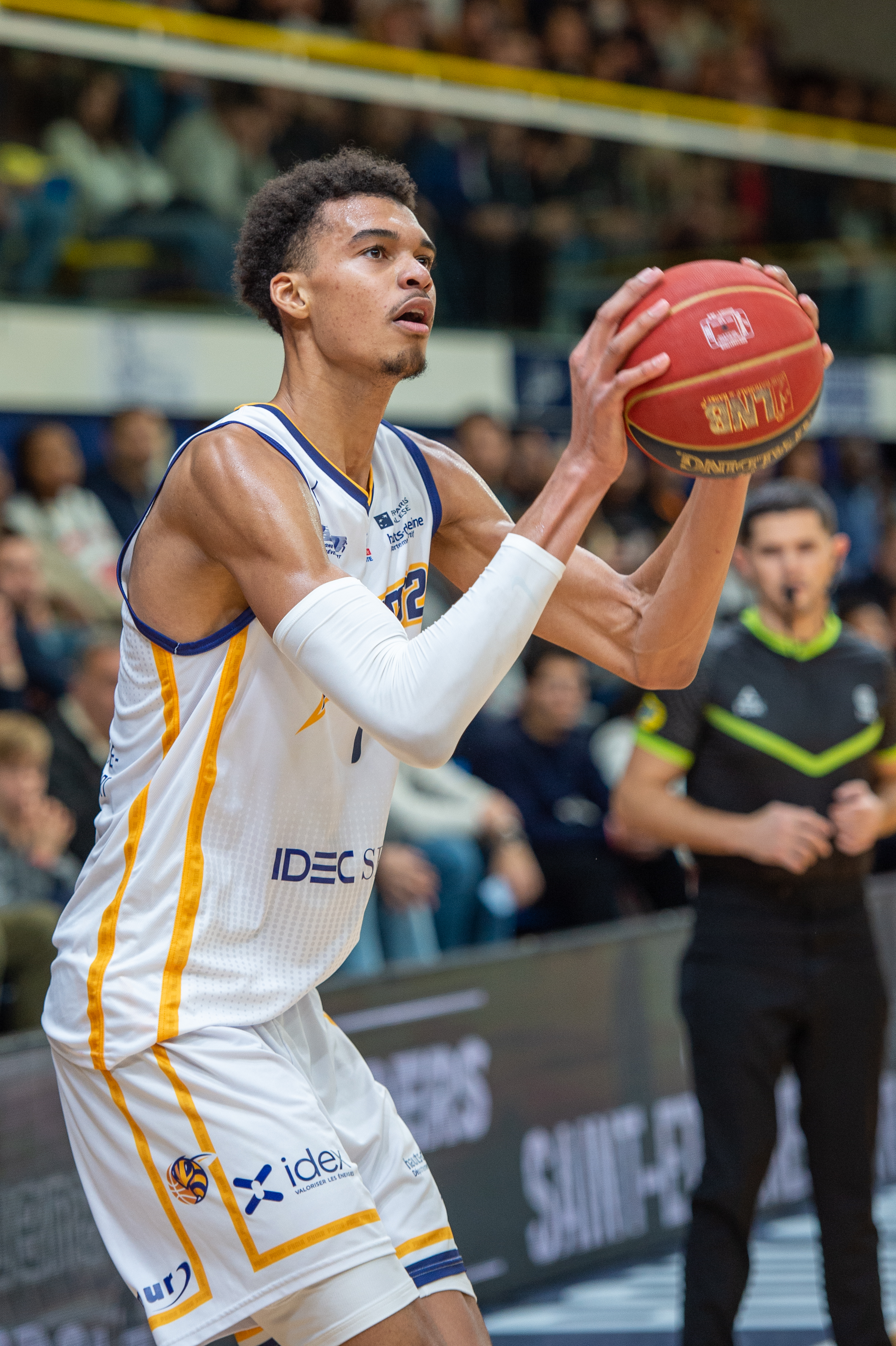
Victor Wembanyama won three times in (2024, 2025, 2026).

| Season | Player | Pos (Note: The player's primary position is listed first.) | Team(s) | Games played | Total blocks | Blocks per game | Ref |
|---|---|---|---|---|---|---|---|
| 1973–74 | Elmore Smith | C | Los Angeles Lakers | 81 | 393 | 4.85 | |
| 1974–75 | Kareem Abdul-Jabbar* (Note: In the 1974–75 NBA season, Elmore Smith had the highest block total (216) but was second in block average (2.92).) | C | Milwaukee Bucks | 65 | 212 | 3.26 | |
| 1975–76 | Kareem Abdul-Jabbar* (2) | C | Los Angeles Lakers | 82 | 338 | 4.12 | |
| 1976–77 | Bill Walton* (Note: In the 1976–77 NBA season, Kareem Abdul-Jabbar and Elvin Hayes both had higher block totals (261 and 220 respectively) but they ranked second and third in block average (3.18 and 2.68 respectively).) | C/F | Portland Trail Blazers | 65 | 211 | 3.25 | |
| 1977–78 | George T. Johnson | C/F | New Jersey Nets | 81 | 274 | 3.38 | |
| 1978–79 | Kareem Abdul-Jabbar* (3) | C | Los Angeles Lakers | 80 | 316 | 3.95 | |
| 1979–80 | Kareem Abdul-Jabbar* (4) | C | Los Angeles Lakers | 82 | 280 | 3.41 | |
| 1980–81 | George T. Johnson (2) | C/F | San Antonio Spurs | 82 | 278 | 3.39 | |
| 1981–82 | George T. Johnson (3) | C/F | San Antonio Spurs | 75 | 234 | 3.12 | |
| 1982–83 | Tree Rollins | C | Atlanta Hawks | 80 | 343 | 4.29 | |
| 1983–84 | Mark Eaton | C | Utah Jazz | 82 | 351 | 4.28 | |
| 1984–85 ‡ | Mark Eaton (2) | C | Utah Jazz | 82 | 456 | 5.56 | |
| 1985–86 | Manute Bol | C | Washington Bullets | 80 | 397 | 4.96 | |
| 1986–87 | Mark Eaton (3) | C | Utah Jazz | 79 | 321 | 4.06 | |
| 1987–88 | Mark Eaton (4) | C | Utah Jazz | 82 | 304 | 3.71 | |
| 1988–89 | Manute Bol (2) | C | Golden State Warriors | 80 | 345 | 4.31 | |
| 1989–90 | Hakeem Olajuwon* (Note: When Hakeem Olajuwon arrived in the United States, the University of Houston incorrectly spelled his first name "Akeem". He used that spelling until March 9, 1991, when he announced that he would add an H.) | C | Houston Rockets | 82 | 376 | 4.59 | |
| 1990–91 | Hakeem Olajuwon* (2) (Note: In the 1990–91 NBA season, David Robinson, Patrick Ewing and Manute Bol all had higher block totals (320, 258 and 247 respectively) but they ranked second, third and fourth in block average (3.90, 3.19 and 3.01 respectively).) | C | Houston Rockets | 56 | 221 | 3.95 | |
| 1991–92 ‡ | David Robinson* | C | San Antonio Spurs | 68 | 305 | 4.49 | |
| 1992–93 ‡ | Hakeem Olajuwon* (3) | C | Houston Rockets | 82 | 342 | 4.17 | |
| 1993–94 | Dikembe Mutombo* | C | Denver Nuggets | 82 | 336 | 4.10 | |
| 1994–95 ‡ | Dikembe Mutombo* (2) | C | Denver Nuggets | 82 | 321 | 3.91 | |
| 1995–96 | Dikembe Mutombo* (3) | C | Denver Nuggets | 74 | 332 | 4.49 | |
| 1996–97 | Shawn Bradley (Note: In the 1996–97 NBA season, Dikembe Mutombo had the highest block total (264) but was second in block average (3.30).) | C | New Jersey Nets; Dallas Mavericks | 73 | 248 | 3.40 | |
| 1997–98 | Marcus Camby (Note: In the 1997–98 NBA season, Dikembe Mutombo and Theo Ratliff both had higher block totals (277 and 258 respectively) but they ranked second and fourth in block average (3.38 and 3.15 respectively).) | C/F | Toronto Raptors | 63 | 230 | 3.65 | |
| 1998–99 (Note: The 1998–99 NBA season was shortened to 50 games due to the league's lockout. The qualification of this season's block title is to appear in at least 43 games (out of 50) or to have at least 61 blocks.) ‡ | Alonzo Mourning* | C | Miami Heat | 46 | 180 | 3.91 | |
| 1999–00 ‡ | Alonzo Mourning* (2) | C | Miami Heat | 79 | 294 | 3.72 | |
| 2000–01 | Theo Ratliff (Note: In the 2000–01 NBA season, Theo Ratliff had only played in 50 games and ranked eighth in block total. Jermaine O'Neal and Shawn Bradley both shared the highest total (228).) | C/F | Philadelphia 76ers | 50 | 187 | 3.74 | |
| 2001–02 ‡ | Ben Wallace* | F/C | Detroit Pistons | 80 | 278 | 3.48 | |
| 2002–03 | Theo Ratliff (2) | C/F | Atlanta Hawks | 81 | 262 | 3.23 | |
| 2003–04 | Theo Ratliff (3) (Note: In the 2003–04 NBA season, Theo Ratliff appeared in 85 games due to a mid-season trade.) | C/F | Atlanta Hawks; Portland Trail Blazers | 85 | 307 | 3.61 | |
| 2004–05 | Andrei Kirilenko (Note: In the 2004–05 NBA season, Andrei Kirilenko had only played in 41 games and ranked thirteenth in block total. Marcus Camby had the highest total (199).) | F | Utah Jazz | 41 | 136 | 3.32 | |
| 2005–06 | Marcus Camby (2) (Note: In the 2005–06 NBA season, Andrei Kirilenko, Josh Smith and Elton Brand all had higher block totals (220, 208 and 201 respectively) but they ranked second, fourth and fifth in block average (3.19, 2.60 and 2.54 respectively).) | C/F | Denver Nuggets | 56 | 184 | 3.29 | |
| 2006–07 ‡ | Marcus Camby (3) | C/F | Denver Nuggets | 70 | 231 | 3.30 | |
| 2007–08 | Marcus Camby (4) | C/F | Denver Nuggets | 79 | 285 | 3.61 | |
| 2008–09 ‡ | Dwight Howard* | C | Orlando Magic | 79 | 231 | 2.92 | |
| 2009–10 ‡ | Dwight Howard* (2) | C | Orlando Magic | 82 | 228 | 2.78 | |
| 2010–11 | Andrew Bogut (Note: In the 2010–11 NBA season, Serge Ibaka, JaVale McGee and Dwight Howard all had higher block totals (198, 193 and 186 respectively) but they ranked third, second and fourth in block average (2.41, 2.44 and 2.38 respectively).) | C | Milwaukee Bucks | 65 | 168 | 2.58 | |
| 2011–12 (Note: The 2011–12 NBA season was shortened to 66 games due to the league's lockout. The qualification of this season's block title is to appear in at least 56 games (out of 66) or to have at least 80 blocks.) | Serge Ibaka | F | Oklahoma City Thunder | 66 | 241 | 3.65 | |
| 2012–13 | Serge Ibaka (2) | F | Oklahoma City Thunder | 80 | 242 | 3.03 | |
| 2013–14 | Anthony Davis^ (Note: In the 2013–14 NBA season, Serge Ibaka and DeAndre Jordan both had higher block totals (219 and 203 respectively) but they ranked second and third in block average (2.7 and 2.5 respectively).) | F/C | New Orleans Pelicans | 67 | 189 | 2.82 | |
| 2014–15 | Anthony Davis^ (2) | F/C | New Orleans Pelicans | 68 | 200 | 2.94 | |
| 2015–16 | Hassan Whiteside | C | Miami Heat | 73 | 269 | 3.68 | |
| 2016–17 | Rudy Gobert^ | C | Utah Jazz | 81 | 214 | 2.64 | |
| 2017–18 | Anthony Davis^ (3) | F/C | New Orleans Pelicans | 75 | 193 | 2.57 | |
| 2018–19 | Myles Turner^ | C | Indiana Pacers | 74 | 199 | 2.69 | |
| 2019–20 | Hassan Whiteside (2) | C | Portland Trail Blazers | 67 | 196 | 2.93 | |
| 2020–21 | Myles Turner^ (2) (Note: In the 2020–21 NBA season, Myles Turner only played in 47 games and ranked second in block total. Rudy Gobert had the highest total (190). Myles Turner was recognized as the leader despite playing fewer than the required 51 games (70% of the season), as his average would still be 3.1 per game even if he played in the added games and not recorded a single block, which would remain higher than Rudy Gobert's 2.7.) | C | Indiana Pacers | 47 | 159 | 3.38 | |
| 2021–22 | Jaren Jackson Jr.^ | F/C | Memphis Grizzlies | 78 | 177 | 2.27 | |
| 2022–23 ‡ | Jaren Jackson Jr.^ (2) (Note: In the 2022–23 NBA season, Brook Lopez had the highest block total (193) but ranked third in block average (2.5).) | F/C | Memphis Grizzlies | 63 | 189 | 3.00 | |
| 2023–24 | Victor Wembanyama^ | C | San Antonio Spurs | 71 | 254 | 3.58 | |
| 2024–25 | Victor Wembanyama^ (2) (Note: In the 2024–25 NBA season, Victor Wembanyama only played in 46 games but ranked first in block total. Walker Kessler had the highest average for qualifying players (2.4). Victor Wembanyama is recognized as the leader despite playing fewer than the required 58 games, as his average would still be 3.0 per game even if he played in the added games and not recorded a single block.) | C | San Antonio Spurs | 46 | 176 | 3.83 | |
| 2025–26 ‡ | Victor Wembanyama^ (3) | C | San Antonio Spurs | 64 | 197 | 3.08 | |

== Multiple-time leaders ==
| Rank | Player | Team(s) | Times leader | Years |
|---|---|---|---|---|
| 1 | Kareem Abdul-Jabbar | Milwaukee Bucks (1); Los Angeles Lakers (3) | 4 | 1975, 1976, 1979, 1980 |
| 1 | Marcus Camby | Toronto Raptors (1); Denver Nuggets (3) | 4 | 1998, 2006, 2007, 2008 |
| 1 | Mark Eaton | Utah Jazz | 4 | 1984, 1985, 1987, 1988 |
| 4 | Anthony Davis | New Orleans Pelicans | 3 | 2014, 2015, 2018 |
| 4 | George T. Johnson | New Jersey Nets (1); San Antonio Spurs (2) | 3 | 1978, 1981, 1982 |
| 4 | Dikembe Mutombo | Denver Nuggets | 3 | 1994, 1995, 1996 |
| 4 | Hakeem Olajuwon | Houston Rockets | 3 | 1990, 1991, 1993 |
| 4 | Theo Ratliff | Atlanta Hawks (2); Portland Trail Blazers (1) | 3 | 2001, 2003, 2004 |
| 4 | Victor Wembanyama | San Antonio Spurs | 3 | 2024, 2025, 2026 |
| 9 | Manute Bol | Washington Bullets (1); Golden State Warriors (1) | 2 | 1986, 1989 |
| 9 | Dwight Howard | Orlando Magic | 2 | 2009, 2010 |
| 9 | Serge Ibaka | Oklahoma City Thunder | 2 | 2012, 2013 |
| 9 | Jaren Jackson Jr. | Memphis Grizzlies | 2 | 2022, 2023 |
| 9 | Alonzo Mourning | Miami Heat | 2 | 1999, 2000 |
| 9 | Myles Turner | Indiana Pacers | 2 | 2019, 2021 |
| 9 | Hassan Whiteside | Miami Heat (1); Portland Trail Blazers (1) | 2 | 2016, 2020 |

== See also ==
- NBA records
- List of NBA career blocks leaders
- List of NBA annual scoring leaders
- List of NBA annual 3-point scoring leaders
- List of NBA annual assists leaders
- List of NBA annual rebounding leaders
- List of NBA annual steals leaders
- List of NBA annual field goal percentage leaders
