= Mark Eaton =

American basketball player (1957–2021)

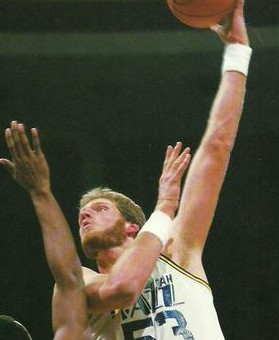
- Eaton with the Utah Jazz c. 1988

Personal information
- Born: January 24, 1957 Inglewood, California, U.S.
- Died: May 28, 2021 (aged 64) Park City, Utah, U.S.
- Listed height: 7 ft 4 in (2.24 m)
- Listed weight: 275 lb (125 kg)

Career information
- High school: Westminster (Westminster, California)
- College: Cypress (1978–1980); UCLA (1980–1982)
- NBA draft: 1982: 4th round, 72nd overall pick
- Drafted by: Utah Jazz
- Playing career: 1982–1994
- Position: Center
- Number: 53

Career history
- 1982–1994: Utah Jazz

Career highlights
- NBA All-Star (1989); 2× NBA Defensive Player of the Year (1985, 1989); 3× NBA All-Defensive First Team (1985, 1986, 1989); 2× NBA All-Defensive Second Team (1987, 1988); 4× NBA blocks leader (1984, 1985, 1987, 1988); No. 53 retired by Utah Jazz

Career NBA statistics
- Points: 5,216 (6.0 ppg)
- Rebounds: 6,939 (7.9 rpg)
- Blocks: 3,064 (3.5 bpg)
- Stats at NBA.com
- Stats at Basketball Reference

Mark Edward Eaton (January 24, 1957 – May 28, 2021) was an American professional basketball player who spent his entire career (1982–1993) with the Utah Jazz of the National Basketball Association (NBA). Named an NBA All-Star in 1989, he was twice voted the NBA Defensive Player of the Year (1985, 1989) and was a five-time member of the NBA All-Defensive Team. The 7-foot-4-inch (2.24 m) Eaton became one of the best defensive centers in NBA history. He led the league in blocks four times and holds the NBA single-season records for blocks (456) and blocked shots per game average (5.6), as well as career blocked shots per game (3.5). His No. 53 was retired by the Jazz.

Eaton was a reserve on his high school basketball team before graduating and working as an auto mechanic. He was discovered by an assistant coach at Cypress College, who persuaded Eaton to enroll at the community college and play basketball. Eaton transferred to play college basketball for the UCLA Bruins, but he was used sparingly. He was drafted in the fourth round of the 1982 NBA draft by the Utah Jazz as a long-term project. Eaton helped transform the Jazz from a last-place team into a perennial playoff team. When he retired from playing in 1994, he ranked second in the NBA in career blocks behind Kareem Abdul-Jabbar.

== Early life ==
Mark Edward Eaton was born on January 24, 1957, in Inglewood, California, and grew up in Southern California. His father, Bud, was a diesel mechanic instructor and stood 6 feet 9 inches (2.06 m) tall, while Eaton's mother, Delores, was 6 feet 0 inches (1.83 m). Despite his height, Eaton was more interested in playing water polo than basketball. As a senior at Westminster High School in Orange County, he stood 6 feet 11 inches (2.11 m) and weighed 175 pounds (79 kg) but was uncoordinated, not very muscular, and relegated to a backup role on the basketball team. "The coaches didn't know how to teach me to play big, and I didn't know how to play big," said Eaton.

== College career ==
After graduating from high school in 1975, Eaton attended the Arizona Automotive Institute in Glendale and graduated as an automotive service technician. He returned to Orange County and worked as an auto mechanic, making $20,000 a year, when he was eventually discovered by Tom Lubin while repairing cars in Anaheim in April 1977. Lubin, a chemistry professor, was an assistant basketball coach at Cypress College. He had previously discovered Swen Nater, who did not play in high school but went on to a long, pro career. Lubin's uncle, Frank, played on the 1936 U.S. Olympic basketball team. Lubin's encouragement led Eaton to enroll at the community college in 1978 and try out for its basketball team.

After his freshman year at Cypress, Eaton was selected by the Phoenix Suns in the fifth round of the 1979 NBA draft with the 107th pick. He was eligible to be drafted because he was already four years removed from high school. However, he opted to return to college basketball. Eaton developed into a solid junior college player under head coach Don Johnson. He averaged 14.3 points per game in two seasons at Cypress and led the school to the California junior college title as a sophomore in 1980.

Eaton transferred to the University of California, Los Angeles (UCLA) in 1980, but did not see much action in his two seasons with the Bruins. He played sparingly under head coach Larry Brown in 1980–81. The tallest players in the starting lineup were Darren Daye and Cliff Pruitt at 6 feet 7 inches (2.01 m), but Eaton was too slow for the team's fast-paced offense. In Eaton's senior year in 1981–82, new coach Larry Farmer vowed to give him a shot to start, but heralded freshman Stuart Gray got the nod instead. Eaton played just 41 total minutes that season, averaging 1.3 points and 2.0 rebounds in 11 games. Farmer did not play him at all towards the end of the season and did not allow him to travel with the team on their last road trip to Oregon and Oregon State. "If I ever felt cheated, that was the time I felt the worst," recalled Eaton in 1985. "I had worked so hard and it wasn't like I was causing any problems."

Eaton was initially disappointed with his inability to play effectively in college. At a summer pickup game, Wilt Chamberlain saw his frustration, and encouraged Eaton to focus on protecting the basket, getting rebounds, and passing the ball to quicker guards, rather than trying to compete with smaller, quicker players in scoring. Eaton cited Chamberlain's advice as the turning point in his basketball career.

== Professional career ==
Because of his lack of playing time at UCLA, few NBA teams had an interest in Eaton after he finished his college career. He paid for two tryout camps, but only received an offer of $15,000 to play in Israel and another for $25,000 in Monte Carlo. However, the Utah Jazz, who finished in last place the prior season, saw him as a potentially dominant defender and selected him as a long-term project in the fourth round of the 1982 NBA draft with the 72nd overall pick. Utah coach Frank Layden quipped, "Like [former University of Utah coach] Jack Gardner said, 'You can't teach height.'" Also the team's general manager, Layden discouraged Eaton from playing in Europe and signed him to a five-year contract, with the first season guaranteed at $45,000, for a total $570,000.

Eaton had worn No. 35 at UCLA, but the number was already taken on the Jazz by Darrell Griffith, prompting Eaton to choose the reversed No. 53. Entering the NBA, Eaton's goal was to become a journeyman backup. He made an immediate impact as a rookie, starting 32 games and replacing Danny Schayes after the cash-strapped Jazz traded the center mid-season. Eaton finished the season with a then-franchise record 275 blocked shots while averaging only 19 minutes per game. His 3.4 blocks per game ranked third in the NBA, behind Atlanta's Tree Rollins and San Diego's Bill Walton.

The Jazz placed Eaton on a six-day-a-week program in the offseason. Layden said they treated him "like a high school kid as far as basketball skills are concerned". Eaton continued to improve in his second season. In 82 games in 1983–84, he grabbed a team-leading 595 rebounds and blocked 351 shots (breaking his own franchise record). His 4.28 blocks per game led the NBA, well ahead of Rollins (who finished second with 3.60 blocks per game). During the season, he failed in his attempt to block the skyhook which gave Kareem Abdul-Jabbar his 31,421st point to break the NBA career scoring record held by Chamberlain. Eaton's strong defense helped the Jazz improve from 30–52 in his rookie season to 45–37, winning their first Midwest Division title and making their first playoff appearance.

In Eaton's third season in 1984–85, he blocked 456 shots, shattering the NBA record for most blocked shots in a single season set during the 1973–74 season by Elmore Smith, who had blocked 393 shots for the Los Angeles Lakers. Eaton averaged 5.56 blocks per game, an NBA single-season record that was more than double the league's second-ranked shot-blocker that season (Houston's Hakeem Olajuwon with 2.68 blocks per game). In addition, Eaton averaged 11.3 rebounds per game, ranking fifth in the league in that category. "We had no idea that he would develop the way he has," said Layden during the season. Eaton was not on the All-Star ballot that year after being one of the final cuts. For his efforts, he was named to the NBA All-Defensive First Team and was honored as the NBA Defensive Player of the Year. On April 26, 1985, Eaton set an NBA single-game playoff record with 10 blocks in a 96–94 loss to the Rockets. His mark stood until 2026, (Note: Eaton's mark had been tied by Olajuwon in 1990 and Andrew Bynum in 2012.) when Victor Wembanyama had 12.

Although he was not a significant offensive contributor, the Jazz relied heavily on Eaton for his shot-blocking, rebounding, and occasional "tippy toe" dunks. With the emergence of superstars Karl Malone and John Stockton, the Jazz became one of the best teams in the NBA. Eaton's stifling defense was a major factor in Utah's success. He continued to rank among NBA leaders in blocked shots, leading the league in 1986–87 and 1987–88. On November 17, 1987, Eaton set a career high with 25 rebounds in a 120–110 win over the Denver Nuggets. In 1988–89, he averaged 10.3 rebounds per game (seventh in the NBA) and 3.84 blocks per game (second behind Golden State's Manute Bol). He was named NBA Defensive Player of the Year for the second time in his career and received his third selection to the NBA All-Defensive First Team. In addition, he was chosen to play in the 1989 NBA All-Star Game, joining teammates Malone and Stockton on the Western Conference team. It was the first time that the Jazz had three players in the All-Star Game.

In the 1989 playoffs, the second-seeded Jazz were upset in the first round 3–0 by the seventh-seeded Warriors. Golden State coach Don Nelson spread out his offense and avoided going inside against Eaton, and they played most of the series with a small lineup in which their tallest players on the court were 6 ft 8 in (2.03 m) Larry Smith or Ben McDonald or even 6 ft 7 in (2.01 m) Rod Higgins. Opponents were increasingly playing with smaller lineups, forcing Eaton to guard a quicker player who would draw him out to the perimeter and seek to drive past him. Utah coach Jerry Sloan countered by decreasing Eaton's playing time and employing his own small lineup with backup center Mike Brown. In 1991–92, there was speculation that the more offensive-minded Brown would start the season at center, but Sloan stuck with Eaton. However, Eaton's playing time dropped to 25 minutes per game from 32 minutes in 1990–91.

After missing just nine games in his first 10 seasons, Eaton was hindered by knee and back injuries late in his career. His rebounding and shot-blocking averages declined. During the 1992–93 season, knee surgery and back problems limited him to 64 games, averaging 17.3 minutes per game, both career lows. A degenerative back ailment forced him to drop out of training camp and miss the 1993–94 season; his contract expired at the end of the season. After therapy failed to correct the problem, he announced his retirement from basketball in September 1994.

== Legacy ==
Eaton spent his entire 11-year NBA career with the Utah Jazz, helping transform the franchise from perennial 50-game losers to perennial 50-game winners. After going 30–52 in his first year, they made the playoffs in each of his 10 other seasons, beginning a run of 20 straight postseason appearances for the Jazz. In 875 games, he scored 5,216 points, grabbed 6,939 rebounds, and blocked 3,064 shots. At the time of his retirement, he ranked second all-time in league history in total blocked shots, behind Kareem Abdul-Jabbar's career total of 3,189. Blocks were not recorded as an official statistic until Abdul-Jabbar's fifth NBA season in 1973–74. Eaton is the NBA's all-time leader in blocks per game, with a career average of 3.50. In a six-season span from his second season through his seventh (1983–1989), he led the league in blocks four times and was the runner-up twice while averaging 4.3 blocks per games over 488 contests. He never averaged more than 10 points per game in a season, which frustrated Utah fans after his scoring tapered off following a career high of 9.7 in 1984–85.

To honor his contributions to the team, the Utah Jazz retired Eaton's No. 53 in 1996. In 2010, he was inducted into the Utah Sports Hall of Fame along with former Jazz player Tom Chambers.

In 2014, Eaton had his jersey retired at Westminster High School and also at Cypress College, along with Swen Nater and head coach Don Johnson.

== Career statistics ==
Legend
GP	Games played	GS	Games started	MPG	Minutes per game
FG%	Field goal percentage	3P%	3-point field goal percentage	FT%	Free throw percentage
RPG	Rebounds per game	APG	Assists per game	SPG	Steals per game
BPG	Blocks per game	PPG	Points per game	**Bold**	Career high
*	Led the league	‡	NBA record

=== NBA ===
==== Regular season ====
Year	Team	GP	GS	MPG	FG%	3P%	FT%	RPG	APG	SPG	BPG	PPG
1982–83	Utah	81	32	18.9	.414	.000	.656	5.7	1.4	.3	3.4	4.3
1983–84	Utah	**82***	78	26.1	.466	.000	.593	7.3	1.4	.3	4.3*	5.6
1984–85	Utah	**82***	**82***	34.3	.449	—	**.712**	**11.3**	**1.5**	.4	**5.6**‡	**9.7**
1985–86	Utah	80	80	31.9	.470	—	.604	8.4	1.3	.4	4.6	8.5
1986–87	Utah	79	79	31.7	.400	—	.657	8.8	1.3	**.5**	4.1*	7.7
1987–88	Utah	**82***	**82***	33.3	.418	—	.623	8.7	.7	**.5**	3.7*	7.0
1988–89	Utah	**82***	**82***	**35.5**	.462	—	.660	10.3	1.0	**.5**	3.8	6.2
1989–90	Utah	**82***	**82***	27.8	.527	—	.669	7.3	.5	.4	2.5	4.8
1990–91	Utah	80	80	32.3	**.579**	—	.634	8.3	.6	**.5**	2.4	5.1
1991–92	Utah	81	81	25.0	.446	—	.598	6.1	.5	.4	2.5	3.3
1992–93	Utah	64	57	17.3	.546	—	.700	4.1	.3	.3	1.2	2.8
Career		875	815	28.8	.458	.000	.649	7.9	1.0	.4	3.5‡	6.0
All-Star		1	0	9.0	—	—	—	5.0	—	—	2.0	—

==== Playoffs ====
Year	Team	GP	GS	MPG	FG%	3P%	FT%	RPG	APG	SPG	BPG	PPG
1984	Utah	11	—	23.1	.512	—	.471	6.9	.8	.5	3.1	4.5
1985	Utah	5	5	31.6	.353	—	.714	9.0	1.0	.8	**5.8**	5.8
1986	Utah	4	4	39.3	.491	—	.667	9.0	**2.5**	.3	4.5	**14.5**
1987	Utah	5	5	38.6	.463	—	.640	**11.0**	.6	.2	4.2	10.8
1988	Utah	11	11	**41.9**	.477	—	.639	9.4	1.2	**1.1**	3.1	7.7
1989	Utah	3	3	33.0	.471	—	**.818**	**11.0**	.3	.3	.7	8.3
1990	Utah	5	5	25.6	.529	—	.200	6.0	.0	.6	2.8	3.8
1991	Utah	9	9	28.3	.516	—	.583	6.2	.6	.1	1.4	4.3
1992	Utah	**16**	**16**	29.6	**.565**	—	.778	5.6	.3	.4	2.3	4.6
1993	Utah	5	5	23.4	.526	—	.500	6.6	.4	.0	1.8	4.4
Career		74	63	31.0	.489	—	.639	7.5	.7	.5	2.8	6.1

=== College ===
Year	Team	GP	GS	MPG	FG%	3P%	FT%	RPG	APG	SPG	BPG	PPG
1980–81	UCLA	**19**	0	**8.2**	**.459**	–	.294	**2.6**	**.2**	**.2**	**1.1**	**2.1**
1981–82	UCLA	11	0	3.7	.417	–	**.800**	2.0	.1	.1	.5	1.3
Career		30	0	6.5	.449	–	.409	2.4	.1	.1	.9	1.8

== Post-playing career ==
After his retirement, Eaton worked for KJZZ-TV in Salt Lake City, providing color commentary and analysis for television broadcasts of Utah Jazz and University of Utah basketball games. He also hosted a radio talk show before Jazz games.

Eaton was a partner in Salt Lake City-area restaurants Tuscany and Franck's.

He was a president/board member of the National Basketball Retired Players Association (NBRPA) from 1997 to 2007. He was also a founder and chairman of the Mark Eaton Standing Tall for Youth organization, which provided sports and outdoor activities for at-risk children in Utah. He was also a motivational speaker, and published the book The Four Commitments of a Winning Team.

In the 2013 NBA Slam Dunk Contest, Jazz player Jeremy Evans jumped over a seated Eaton to dunk the ball. In later years, Eaton became a mentor to Jazz center Rudy Gobert, who joined him as the only other player in the franchise's history to be named defensive player of the year.

== Personal life ==
Eaton married his first wife, Marci, in 1980. A registered nurse who trained in Los Angeles, she worked as a nurse in Santa Monica to support him while he was attending college. The Eatons had two sons, Nicolas and Douglas.

While living in Utah in Jeremy Ranch in the 1980s, Eaton ordered a mountain bike suitable for his body frame, and he biked a number of the region's first mountain bike trails. Around 2016, he began riding a custom French-built road bike for tall cyclists, which came outfitted with 36-inch (910 mm) wheels.

On May 28, 2021, Eaton biked with a neighbor to lunch. A few hours after returning home, Eaton told his wife, Teri, that he was going for a short ride in the neighborhood. He died after a bicycle accident about a block from his home in Park City, Utah. He was found unresponsive by a passerby and was pronounced dead at the hospital. He was 64 years old. The sheriff said that there were no witnesses to the incident nor any indication that a vehicle was involved.

== Publications ==
- Eaton, Mark (2018). The Four Commitments of a Winning Team. Greenleaf Book Group Press. ISBN 9781626345324.

== See also ==
- List of NBA career playoff blocks leaders
- List of NBA annual blocks leaders
- List of NBA single-game blocks leaders
- List of NBA single-season blocks per game leaders
- List of NBA players who have spent their entire career with one franchise
- List of tallest players in National Basketball Association history
