= NBA Defensive Player of the Year =

National Basketball Association award

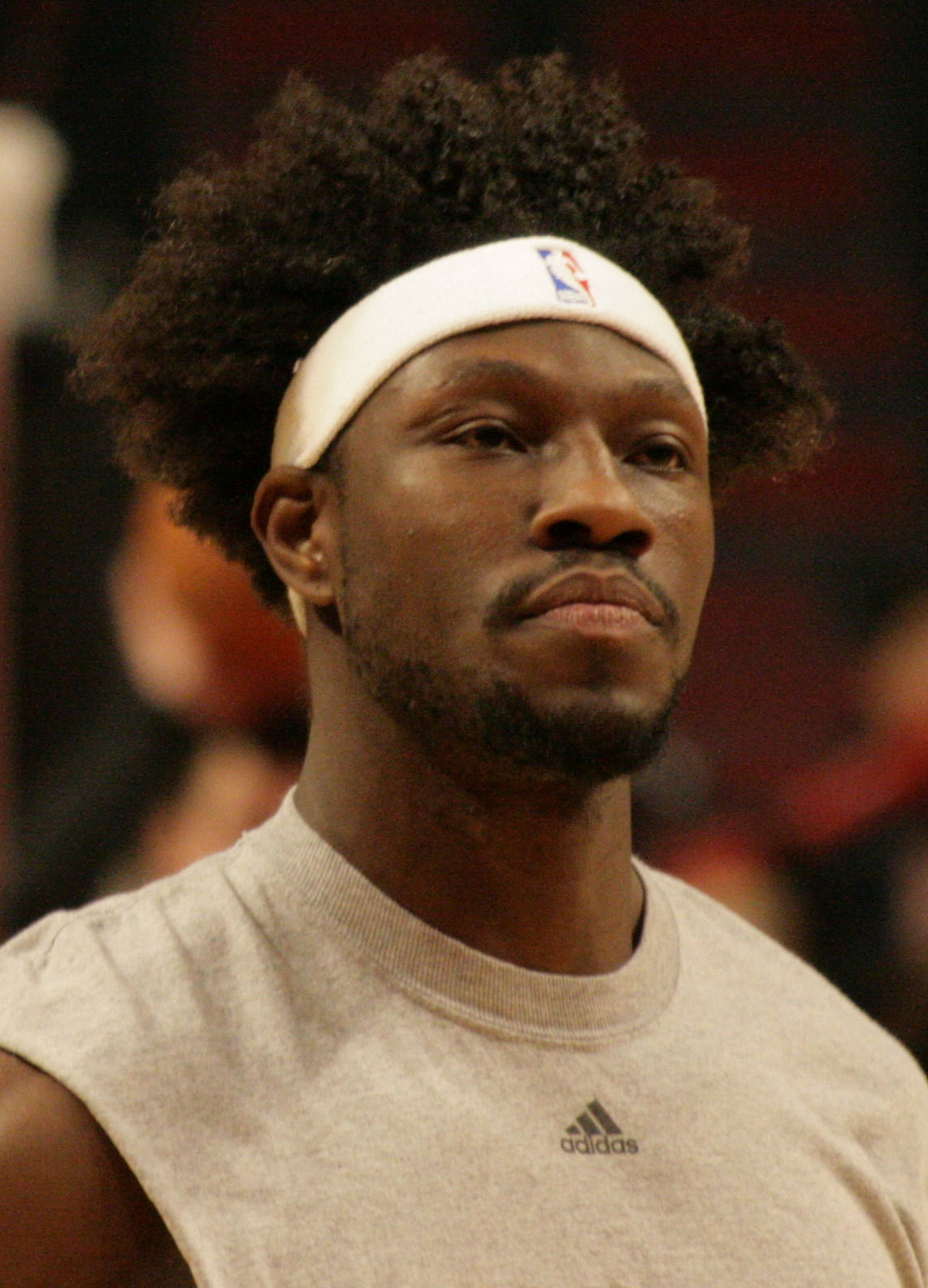
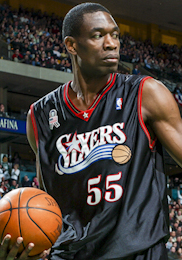
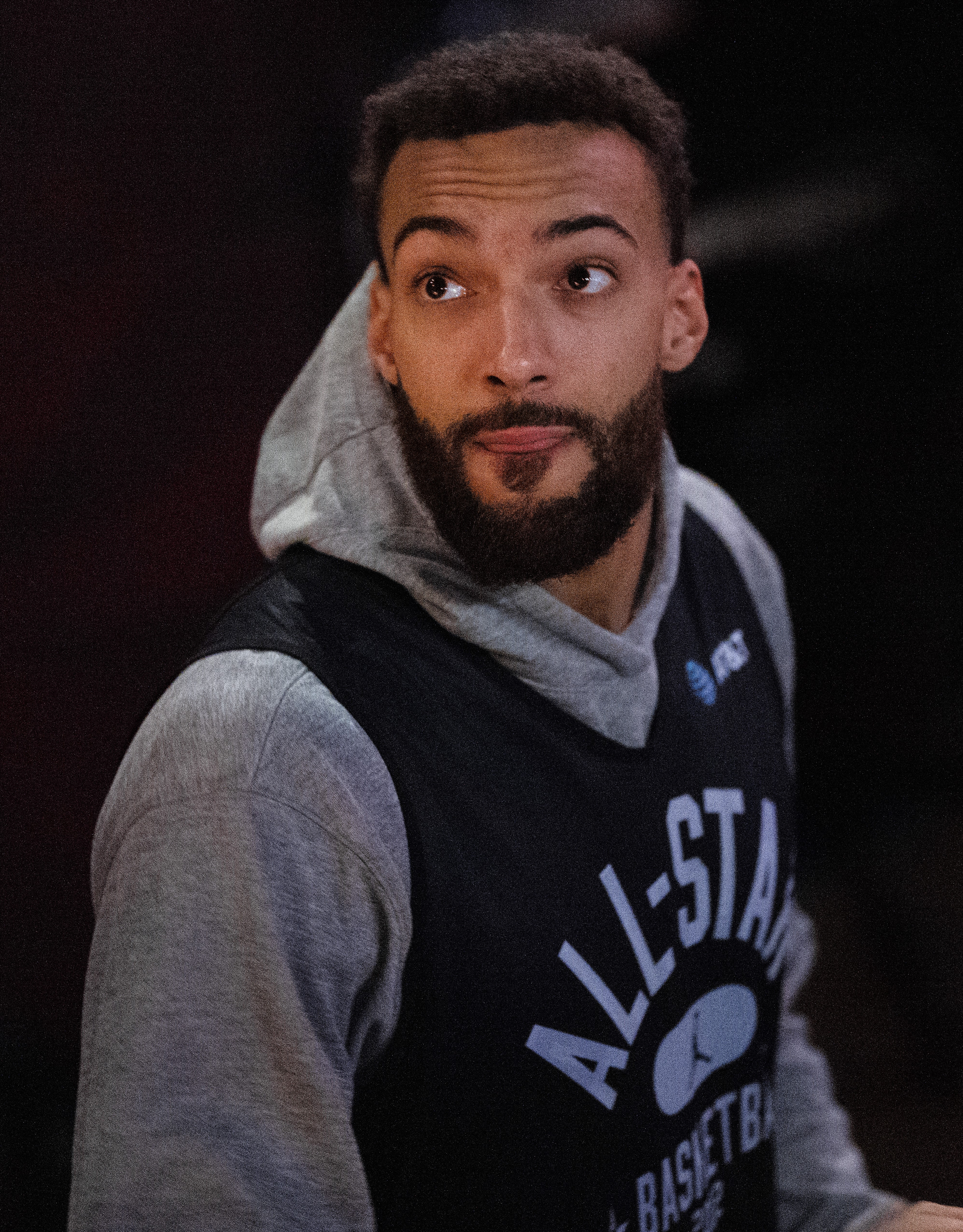
- Ben Wallace, Dikembe Mutombo and Rudy Gobert have each won the award a record four times.
- Sport: Basketball
- League: National Basketball Association
- Awarded for: Best defensive player in regular season of the National Basketball Association

History
- First award: 1982–83
- Most wins: 4 (three-way tie): Dikembe Mutombo, Denver Nuggets/Atlanta Hawks/Philadelphia 76ers (1995, 1997, 1998, 2001); Ben Wallace, Detroit Pistons (2002, 2003, 2005, 2006); Rudy Gobert, Utah Jazz/Minnesota Timberwolves (2018, 2019, 2021, 2024)
- Most recent: Victor Wembanyama, San Antonio Spurs (2026)

The NBA Defensive Player of the Year is an annual National Basketball Association (NBA) award given since the 1982–83 NBA season to the best defensive player of the regular season. The winner is selected by a panel of 124 sportswriters and broadcasters throughout the United States and Canada, each of whom casts a vote for first, second and third place selections. Each first-place vote is worth five points, second-place votes are worth three points, and a third-place vote is worth one. The player with the highest point total, regardless of the number of first-place votes, wins the award. Since the 2022–23 NBA season, winners receive the Hakeem Olajuwon Trophy, named after the two-time defensive player of the year winner.

Dikembe Mutombo, Ben Wallace, and Rudy Gobert have each won the award a record four times. Dwight Howard has won the award three times, and is the only player ever to have won it in three consecutive seasons. Sidney Moncrief, Mark Eaton, Dennis Rodman, Hakeem Olajuwon, Alonzo Mourning and Kawhi Leonard have each won it twice. The most recent award recipient is Victor Wembanyama of the San Antonio Spurs.

Although five of the first six winners were perimeter players, the award has traditionally been given to big men who rebound and block shots. Only eight perimeter players have been honored: Moncrief, Alvin Robertson, Michael Cooper, Michael Jordan, Gary Payton, Ron Artest, Kawhi Leonard and Marcus Smart. Payton and Smart are the only two point guards to have won. Jordan, Olajuwon, David Robinson, Kevin Garnett and Giannis Antetokounmpo are the only winners to have also won the NBA Most Valuable Player Award (MVP) during their careers; Jordan, Olajuwon and Antetokounmpo won both awards in the same season. In Olajuwon's case, he is the only one to have also won the NBA Finals MVP Award and the NBA championship in the same season. Jordan is the only recipient to have also won the scoring title in the same season, when he also became the only player to win the award while averaging over 30 points per game (35.0). On four occasions, the Defensive Player of the Year recipient was not voted to the NBA All-Defensive First Team in the same year. Robertson in 1986, Mutombo (1995), Tyson Chandler (2012), and Marc Gasol (2013) were instead named to the second team. Whereas the Defensive Player of the Year is voted on by the media, the All-Defensive teams were voted on by NBA coaches prior to 2014.

As part of efforts to reduce load management for star players in the league, effective with the 2023–24 season, when a new collective bargaining agreement (CBA) between the league and its players' union took effect, players must appear in at least 65 games to be eligible for most major regular-season awards, including Defensive Player of the Year. To receive credit for a game for purposes of award eligibility, a player must have been credited with at least 20 minutes played. However, two "near misses", in which the player appeared for 15 to 19 minutes, can be included in the 65-game count. Protections also exist for players who suffer season-ending injuries, who are eligible with 62 credited games, and those affected by what the CBA calls "bad faith circumstances".

== Winners ==
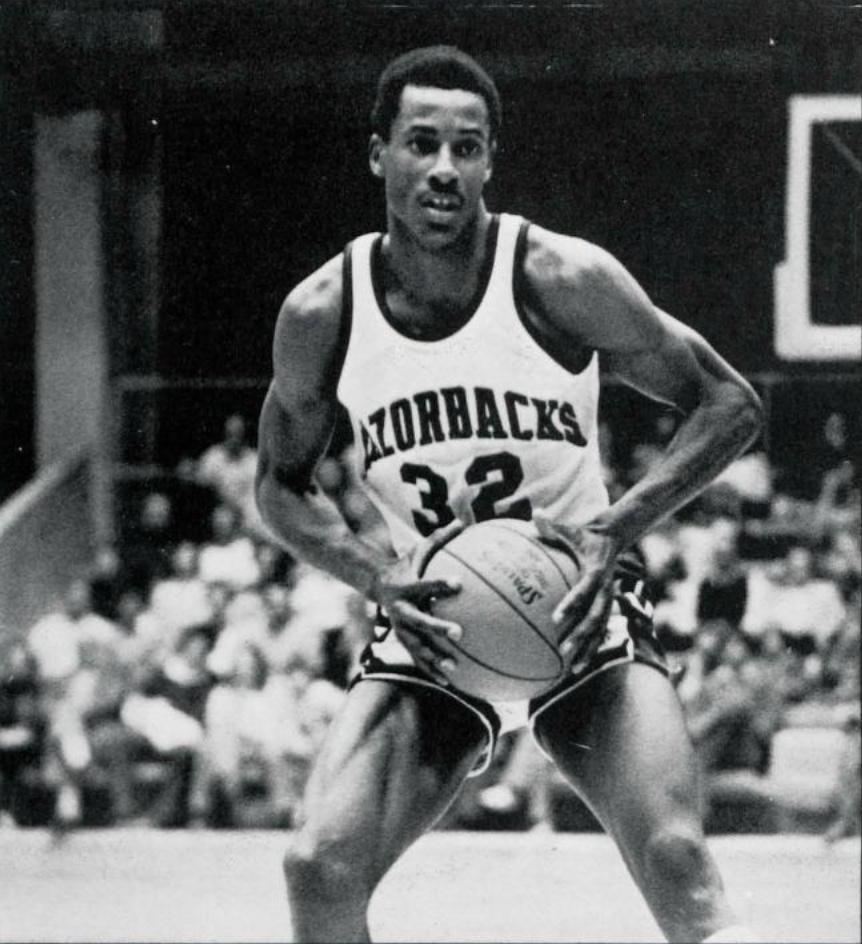
Sidney Moncrief was the inaugural winner in 1983.

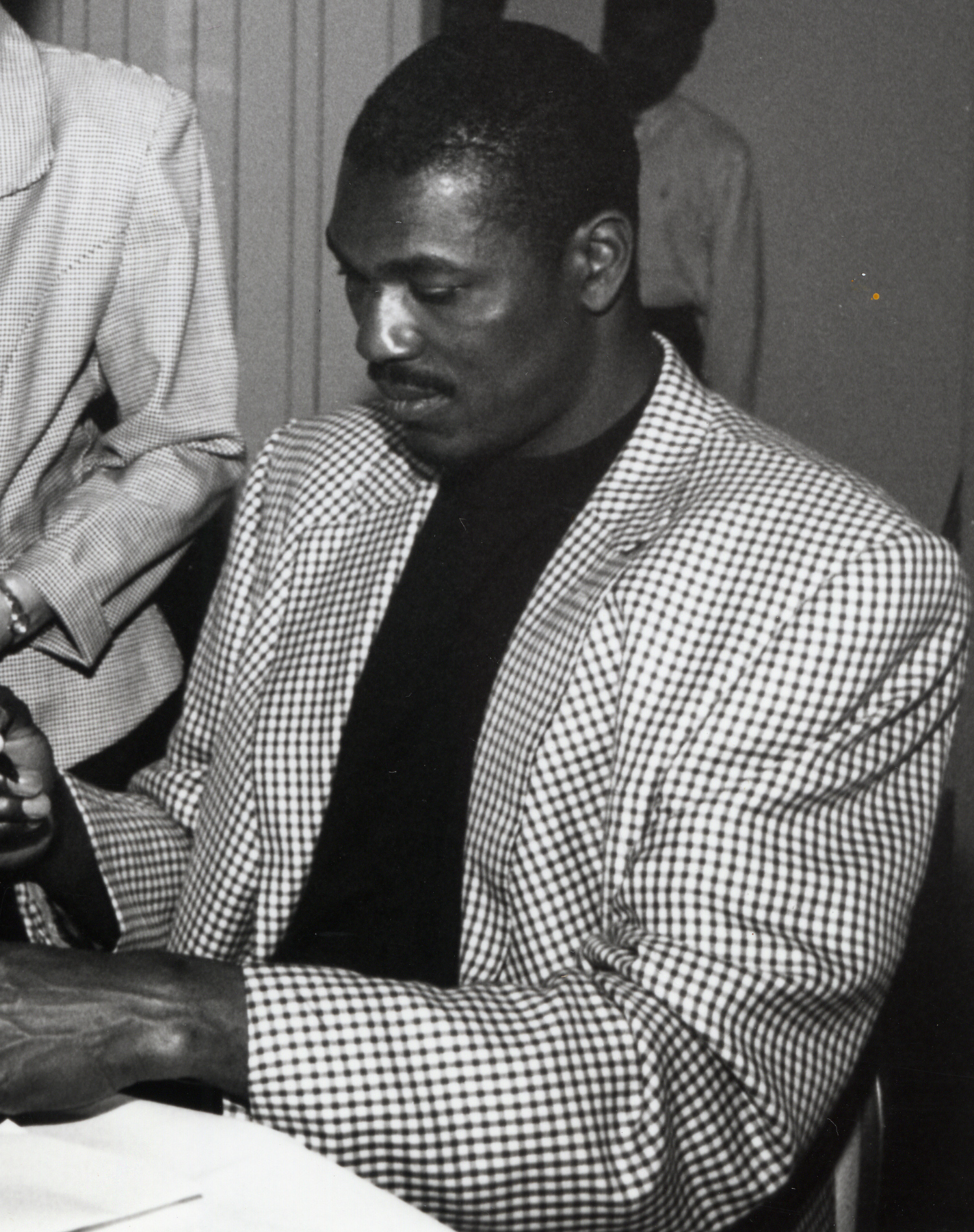
Hakeem Olajuwon won the award two times. In 2022, the award was named the "Hakeem Olajuwon Trophy".

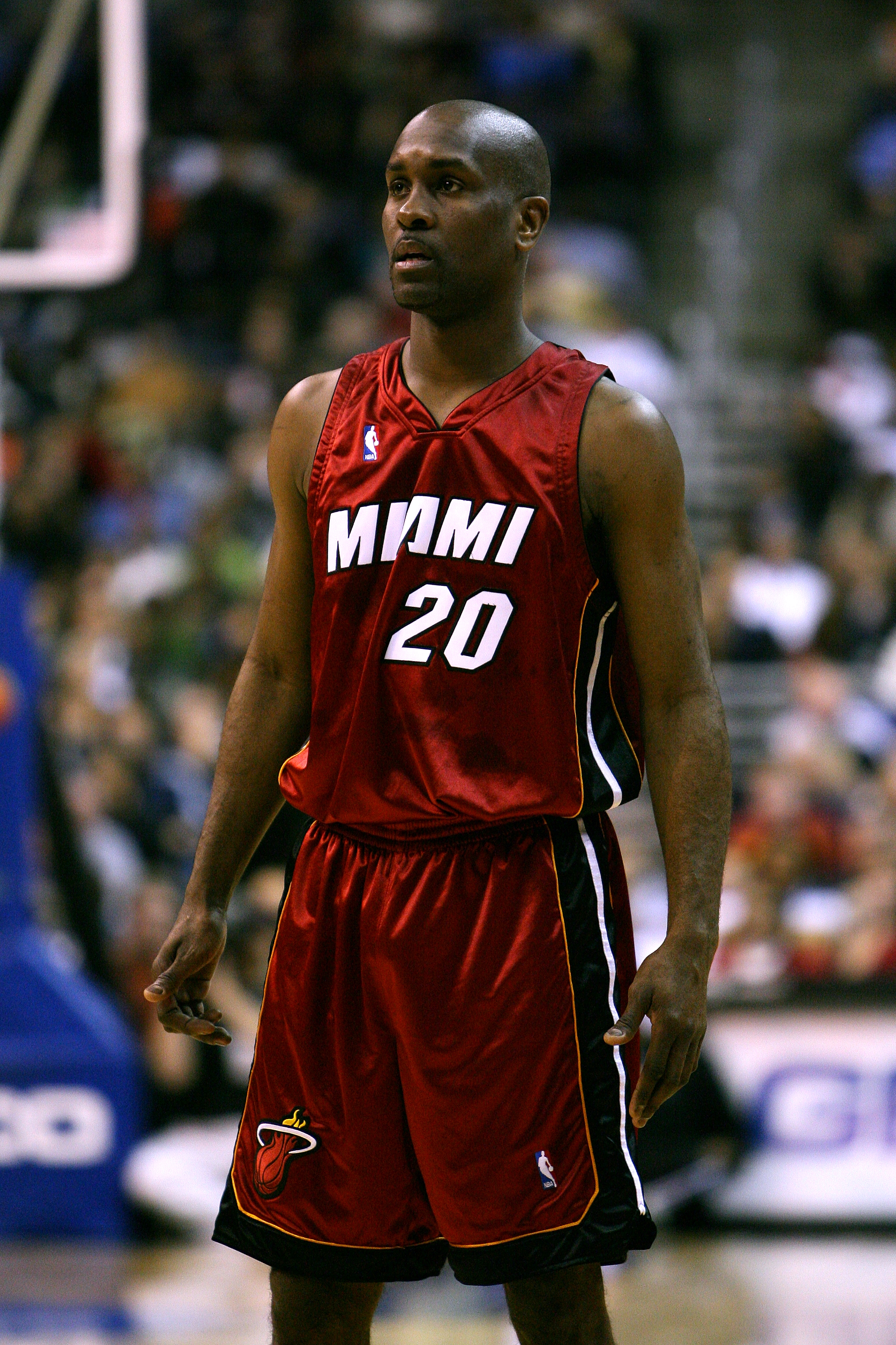
Gary Payton was the first point guard to win the award.

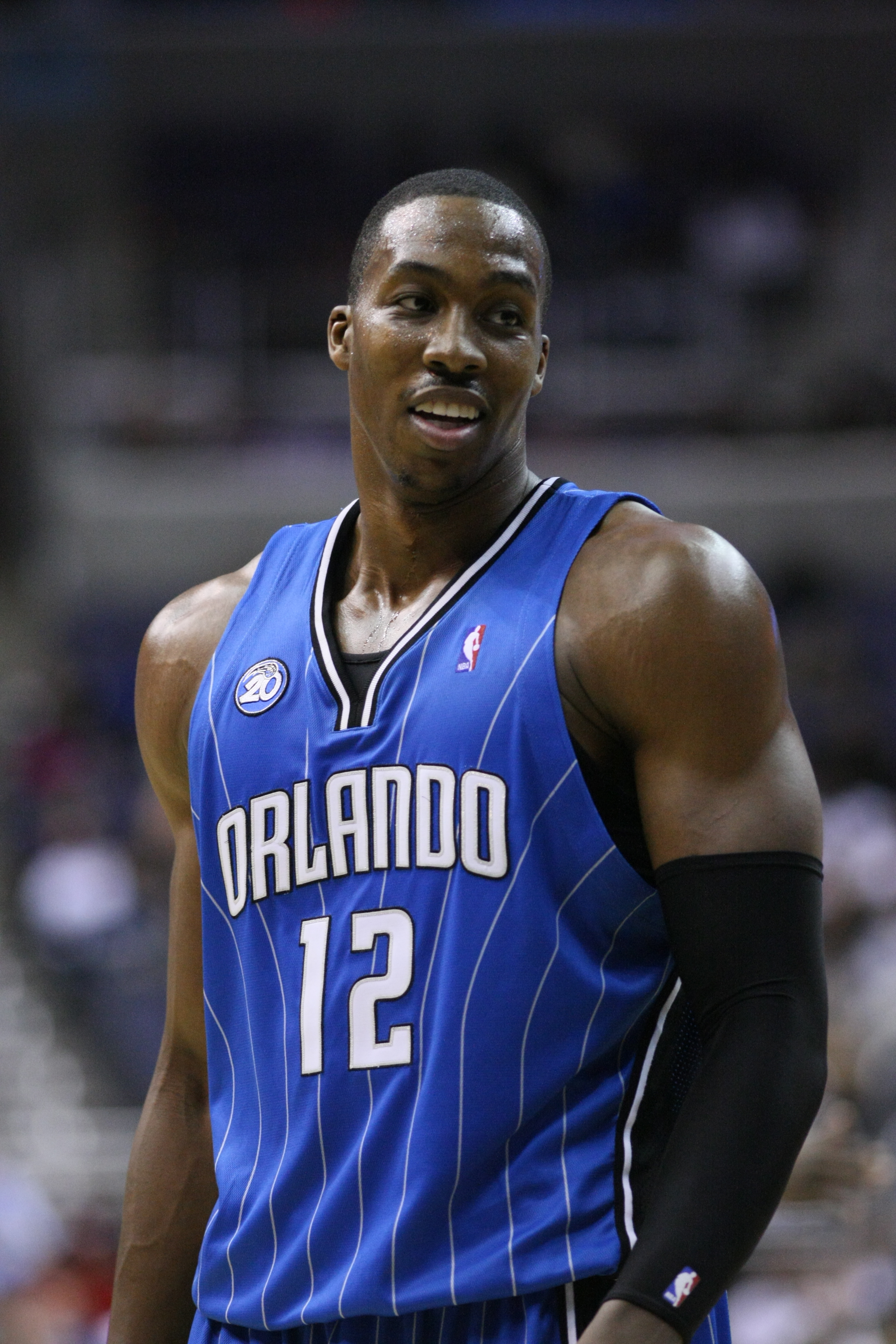
Dwight Howard won the award in three consecutive years (2009–2011).

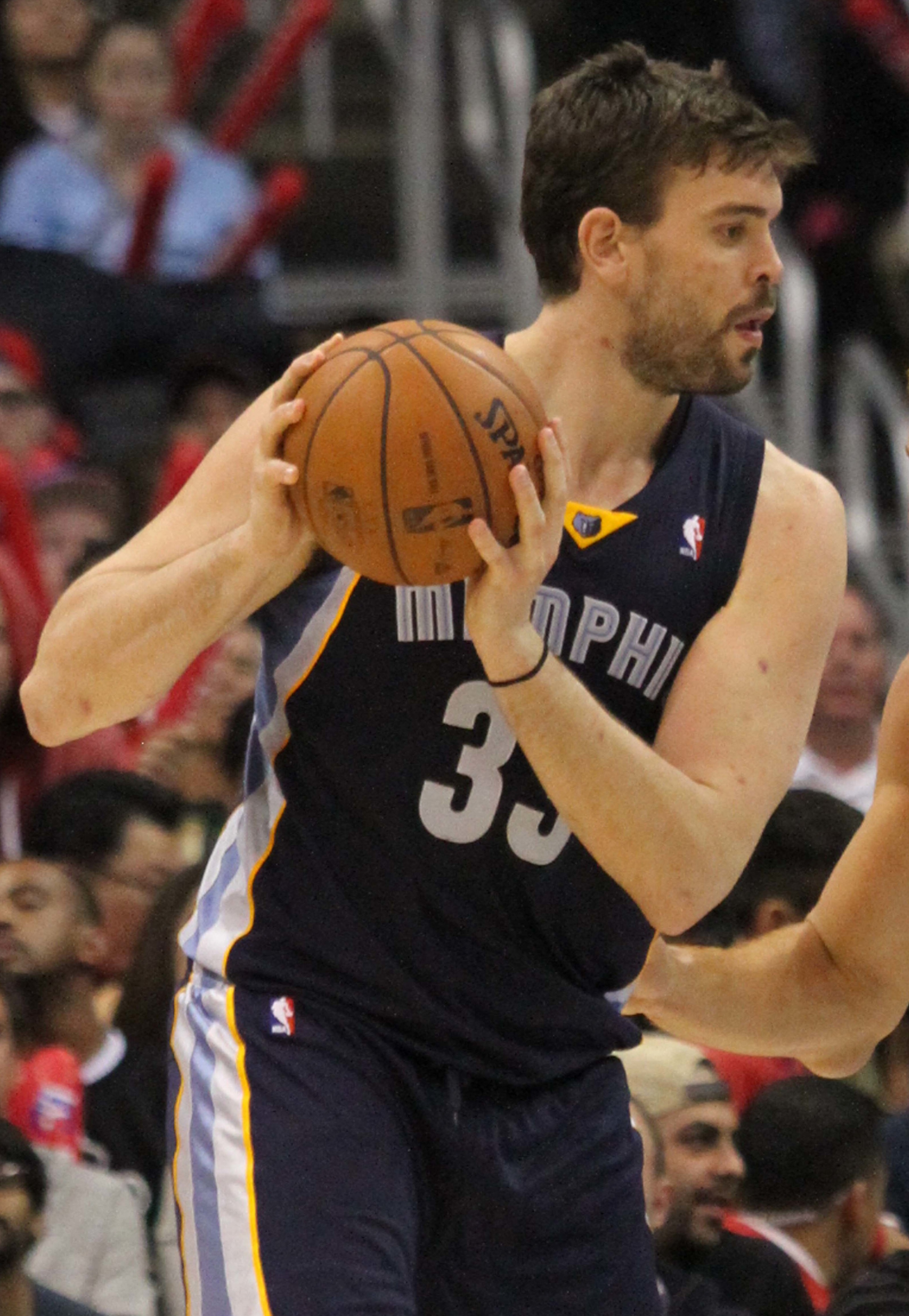
Marc Gasol was the first European player to win the award (2013).

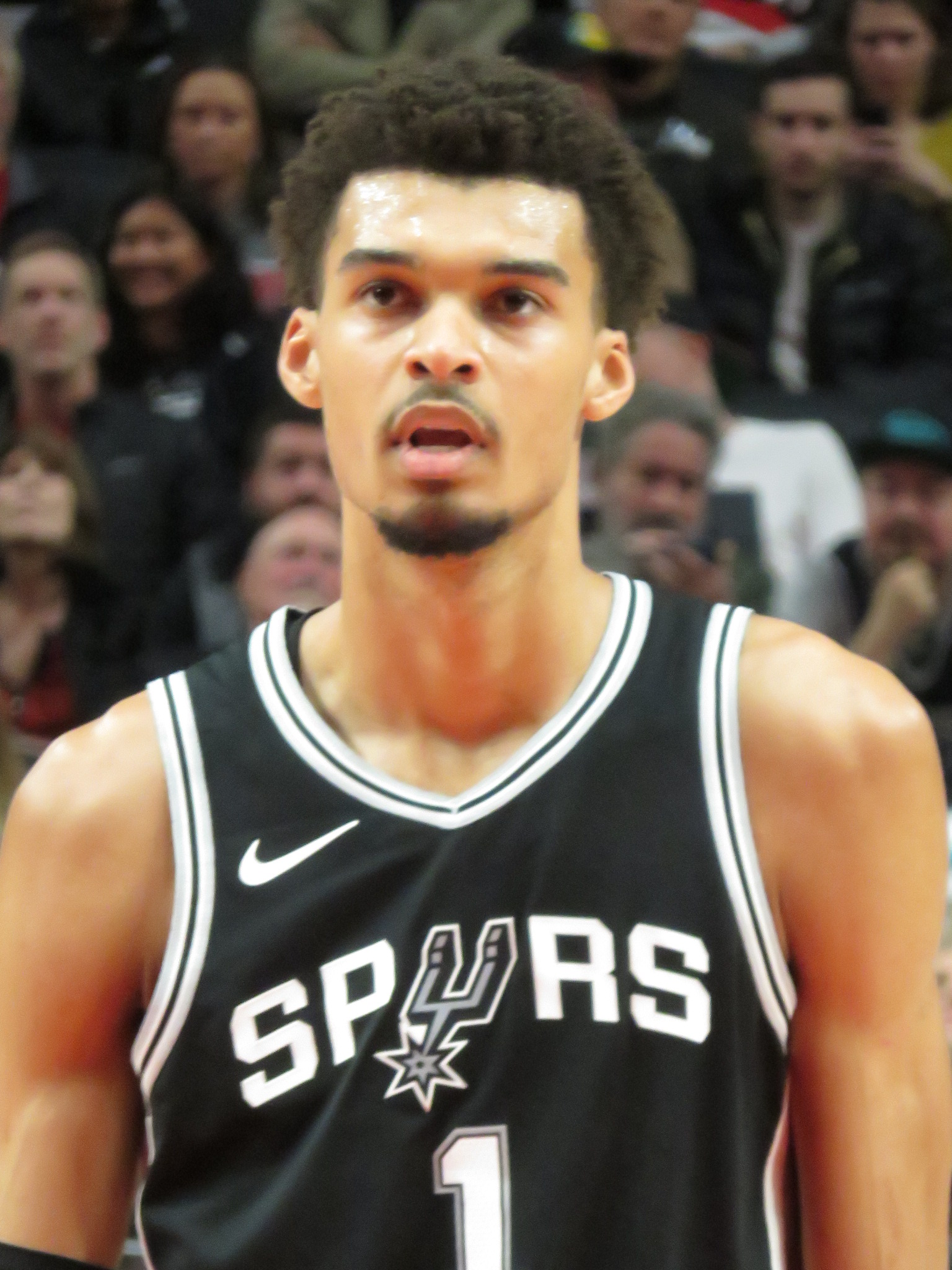
Victor Wembanyama is the youngest and only unanimous winner of the award, and the most recent recipient.

^	Denotes player who is still active in the NBA
*	Inducted into the Naismith Memorial Basketball Hall of Fame
§	1st time eligible for Hall of Fame in 2025
†	Denotes player was a unanimous winner
Player (#)	Denotes the number of times the player has received the award
Team (#)	Denotes the number of times a player from this team has won

Season	Player	Position	Nationality	Team
1982–83	Sidney Moncrief*	Shooting guard	United States	Milwaukee Bucks
1983–84	Sidney Moncrief* (2)	Shooting guard	United States	Milwaukee Bucks (2)
1984–85	Mark Eaton	Center	United States	Utah Jazz
1985–86	Alvin Robertson	Shooting guard	United States	San Antonio Spurs
1986–87	Michael Cooper* (Note: Won NBA championship in same season)	Shooting guard	United States	Los Angeles Lakers
1987–88	Michael Jordan* (Note: Won NBA Most Valuable Player Award in same season)	Shooting guard	United States	Chicago Bulls
1988–89	Mark Eaton (2)	Center	United States	Utah Jazz (2)
1989–90	Dennis Rodman*	Small forward	United States	Detroit Pistons
1990–91	Dennis Rodman* (2)	Small forward	United States	Detroit Pistons (2)
1991–92	David Robinson*	Center	United States	San Antonio Spurs (2)
1992–93	Hakeem Olajuwon*	Center	United States (Note: Hakeem Olajuwon was born in Nigeria, but became a naturalized United States citizen in 1993.)	Houston Rockets
1993–94	Hakeem Olajuwon* (2)	Center	United States	Houston Rockets (2)
1994–95	Dikembe Mutombo*	Center	Zaire (Note: Zaire was renamed the Democratic Republic of the Congo in May 1997.)	Denver Nuggets
1995–96	Gary Payton*	Point guard	United States	Seattle SuperSonics
1996–97	Dikembe Mutombo* (2)	Center	Zaire	Atlanta Hawks
1997–98	Dikembe Mutombo* (3)	Center	Democratic Republic of the Congo	Atlanta Hawks (2)
1998–99	Alonzo Mourning*	Center	United States	Miami Heat
1999–00	Alonzo Mourning* (2)	Center	United States	Miami Heat (2)
2000–01	Dikembe Mutombo* (4)	Center	Democratic Republic of the Congo	Philadelphia 76ers
2001–02	Ben Wallace*	Center	United States	Detroit Pistons (3)
2002–03	Ben Wallace* (2)	Center	United States	Detroit Pistons (4)
2003–04	Ron Artest	Small forward	United States	Indiana Pacers
2004–05	Ben Wallace* (3)	Center	United States	Detroit Pistons (5)
2005–06	Ben Wallace* (4)	Center	United States	Detroit Pistons (6)
2006–07	Marcus Camby	Center	United States	Denver Nuggets (2)
2007–08	Kevin Garnett*	Power forward	United States	Boston Celtics
2008–09	Dwight Howard*	Center	United States	Orlando Magic
2009–10	Dwight Howard* (2)	Center	United States	Orlando Magic (2)
2010–11	Dwight Howard* (3)	Center	United States	Orlando Magic (3)
2011–12	Tyson Chandler	Center	United States	New York Knicks
2012–13	Marc Gasol	Center	Spain	Memphis Grizzlies
2013–14	Joakim Noah	Center	France (Note: Noah was born in the United States to a French father and a Swedish mother, and has played on the France national basketball team.)	Chicago Bulls (2)
2014–15	Kawhi Leonard^	Small forward	United States	San Antonio Spurs (3)
2015–16	Kawhi Leonard^ (2)	Small forward	United States	San Antonio Spurs (4)
2016–17	Draymond Green^	Power forward	United States	Golden State Warriors
2017–18	Rudy Gobert^	Center	France	Utah Jazz (3)
2018–19	Rudy Gobert^ (2)	Center	France	Utah Jazz (4)
2019–20	Giannis Antetokounmpo^	Power forward	Greece	Milwaukee Bucks (3)
2020–21	Rudy Gobert^ (3)	Center	France	Utah Jazz (5)
2021–22	Marcus Smart^	Point guard	United States	Boston Celtics (2)
2022–23	Jaren Jackson Jr.^	Power forward	United States	Memphis Grizzlies (2)
2023–24	Rudy Gobert^ (4)	Center	France	Minnesota Timberwolves
2024–25	Evan Mobley^	Power forward	United States	Cleveland Cavaliers
2025–26	Victor Wembanyama^ †	Center	France	San Antonio Spurs (5)

== Multi-time winners ==
Awards	Player	Team	Years
4	(Democratic Republic of the Congo) Dikembe Mutombo	Denver Nuggets, Atlanta Hawks (2), Philadelphia 76ers	1995, 1997, 1998, 2001
4	(United States) Ben Wallace	Detroit Pistons	2002, 2003, 2005, 2006
4	(France) Rudy Gobert	Utah Jazz (3), Minnesota Timberwolves	2018, 2019, 2021, 2024
3	(United States) Dwight Howard	Orlando Magic	2009, 2010, 2011
2	(United States) Sidney Moncrief	Milwaukee Bucks	1983, 1984
2	(United States) Mark Eaton	Utah Jazz	1985, 1989
2	(United States) Dennis Rodman	Detroit Pistons	1990, 1991
2	(Nigeria) Hakeem Olajuwon	Houston Rockets	1993, 1994
2	(United States) Alonzo Mourning	Miami Heat	1999, 2000
2	(United States) Kawhi Leonard	San Antonio Spurs	2015, 2016

== Teams ==
Awards	Teams	Years
6	Detroit Pistons	1990, 1991, 2002, 2003, 2005, 2006
5	Utah Jazz	1985, 1989, 2018, 2019, 2021
5	San Antonio Spurs	1986, 1992, 2015, 2016, 2026
3	Milwaukee Bucks	1983, 1984, 2020
3	Orlando Magic	2009, 2010, 2011
2	Atlanta Hawks	1997, 1998
2	Boston Celtics	2008, 2022
2	Chicago Bulls	1988, 2014
2	Denver Nuggets	1995, 2007
2	Houston Rockets	1993, 1994
2	Miami Heat	1999, 2000
2	Memphis Grizzlies	2013, 2023
1	Golden State Warriors	2017
1	Indiana Pacers	2004
1	Los Angeles Lakers	1987
1	Minnesota Timberwolves	2024
1	New York Knicks	2012
1	Philadelphia 76ers	2001
1	Seattle SuperSonics	1996
1	Cleveland Cavaliers	2025
0	Brooklyn Nets	None
0	Charlotte Hornets	None
0	Dallas Mavericks	None
0	Los Angeles Clippers	None
0	New Orleans Pelicans	None
0	Phoenix Suns	None
0	Portland Trail Blazers	None
0	Sacramento Kings	None
0	Toronto Raptors	None
0	Washington Wizards	None

== See also ==
- NBA G League Defensive Player of the Year Award
- NBA records
