= List of NBA career blocks leaders =

There are two lists:

The 50 National Basketball Association players with the most career regular season blocked shots.

Blocked shots were first officially recorded in the NBA during the 1973–74 NBA season.

A progressive list of NBA blocked shots leaders year by year since 1973.

== Blocks leaders ==
This is a list of National Basketball Association players by total career regular season leaders in blocking shots. (Note: The National Basketball Association did not record blocked shot statistics until 1973–74 NBA season.)

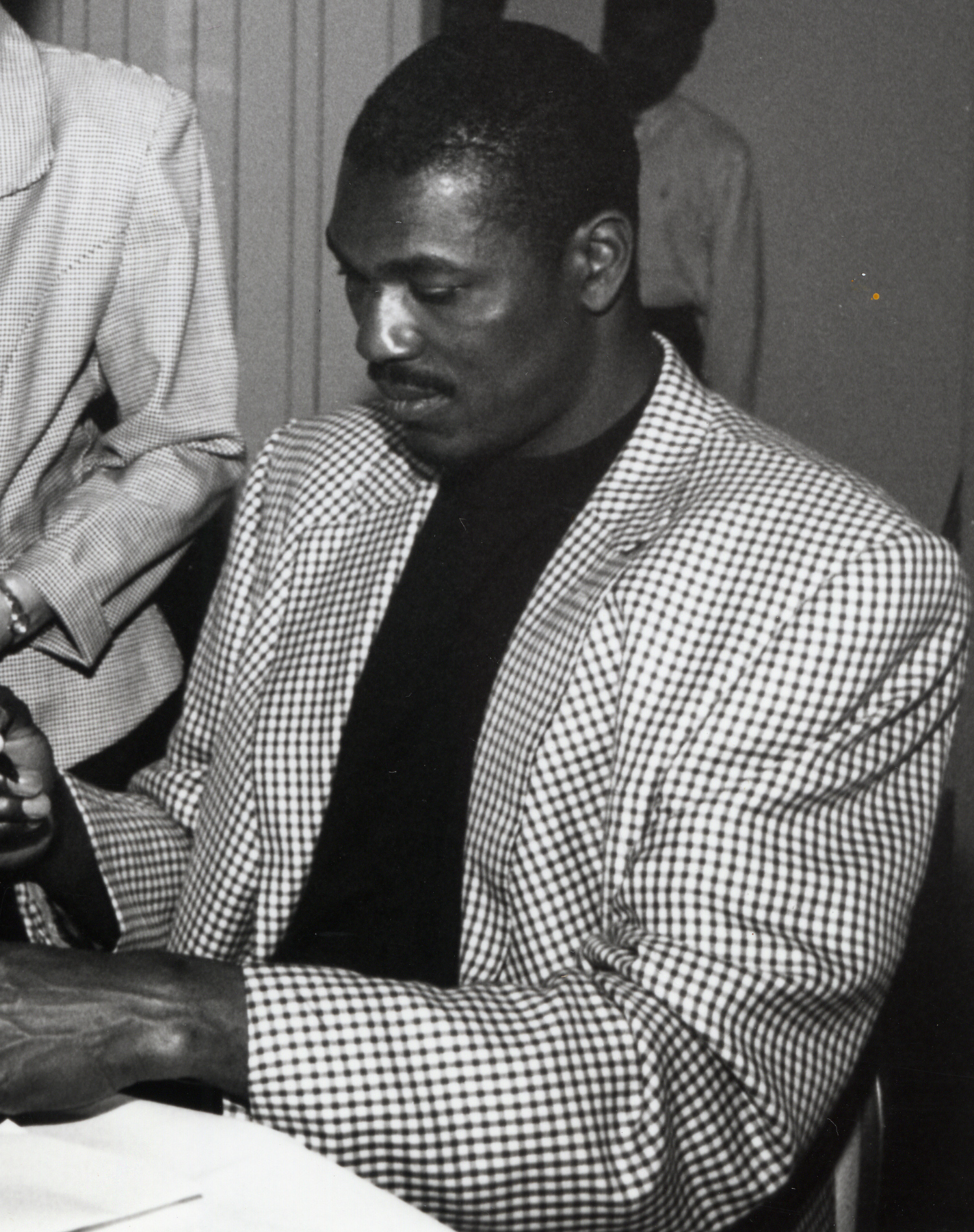
Hakeem Olajuwon has the most blocks in NBA history.

| ^ | Active NBA player |
| * | Inducted into the Naismith Memorial Basketball Hall of Fame |

Statistics accurate as of November 18, 2026.

| Rank | Player | Pos | Team(s) played for (years) (Note: American Basketball Association (ABA) teams other than those admitted into the NBA in 1976 are not included; each year is linked to an article about that particular NBA season.) | Total blocks | Games played (Note: Games played in prior seasons where blocks were not recorded are not included in total games played nor are they used in calculating the per game average.) | Blocks per game average (Note: Average is rounded to the nearest hundredth and its calculation does not include games played in seasons before blocks were officially recorded.) |
|---|---|---|---|---|---|---|
| 1 | Hakeem Olajuwon* | C | Houston Rockets (1984–2001); Toronto Raptors (2001–2002) | 3,830 | 1,238 | 3.09 |
| 2 | Dikembe Mutombo* | C | Denver Nuggets (1991–1996); Atlanta Hawks (1996–2001); Philadelphia 76ers (2001–2002); New Jersey Nets (2002–2003); New York Knicks (2003–2004); Houston Rockets (2004–2009) | 3,289 | 1,196 | 2.75 |
| 3 | Kareem Abdul-Jabbar* | C | Milwaukee Bucks (1969–1973) (Note: Blocked shots were not yet recorded during the player's tenure with this team and season(s).); Milwaukee Bucks (1973–1975); Los Angeles Lakers (1975–1989) | 3,189 | 1,239 | 2.57 |
| 4 | Mark Eaton | C | Utah Jazz (1982–1993) | 3,064 | 875 | 3.50 |
| 5 | Tim Duncan* | PF/C | San Antonio Spurs (1997–2016) | 3,020 | 1,392 | 2.17 |
| 6 | David Robinson* | C | San Antonio Spurs (1989–2003) | 2,954 | 987 | 2.99 |
| 7 | Patrick Ewing* | C | New York Knicks (1985–2000); Seattle SuperSonics (2000–2001); Orlando Magic (2001–2002) | 2,894 | 1,183 | 2.45 |
| 8 | Shaquille O'Neal* | C | Orlando Magic (1992–1996); Los Angeles Lakers (1996–2004); Miami Heat (2004–2008); Phoenix Suns (2008–2009); Cleveland Cavaliers (2009–2010); Boston Celtics (2010–2011) | 2,732 | 1,207 | 2.26 |
| 9 | Tree Rollins | C | Atlanta Hawks (1977–1988); Cleveland Cavaliers (1988–1990); Detroit Pistons (1990–1991); Houston Rockets (1991–1993); Orlando Magic (1993–1995) | 2,542 | 1,156 | 2.20 |
| 10 | Robert Parish* | C | Golden State Warriors (1976–1980); Boston Celtics (1980–1994); Charlotte Hornets (1994–1996); Chicago Bulls (1996–1997) | 2,361 | 1,611 | 1.47 |
| 11 | Alonzo Mourning* | C | Charlotte Hornets (1992–1995); Miami Heat (1995–2003, 2005–2008); New Jersey Nets (2003–2004) | 2,356 | 838 | 2.81 |
| 12 | Marcus Camby | C | Toronto Raptors (1996–1998); New York Knicks (1998–2002, 2012–2013); Denver Nuggets (2003–2008); Los Angeles Clippers (2008–2010); Portland Trail Blazers (2010–2012); Houston Rockets (2012) | 2,331 | 973 | 2.40 |
| 13 | Dwight Howard* | C | Orlando Magic (2004–2012); Los Angeles Lakers (2012–2013, 2019–2020, 2021–2022); Houston Rockets (2013–2016); Atlanta Hawks (2016–2017); Charlotte Hornets (2017–2018); Washington Wizards (2018–2019); Philadelphia 76ers (2020–2021) | 2,228 | 1,242 | 1.79 |
| 14 | Brook Lopez^ | C | New Jersey/Brooklyn Nets (2008–2017); Los Angeles Lakers (2017–2018); Milwaukee Bucks (2018–2025); Los Angeles Clippers (2025–present) | 2,159 | 1,193 | 1.81 |
| 15 | Ben Wallace* | C | Washington Bullets/Wizards (1996–1999); Orlando Magic (1999–2000); Detroit Pistons (2000–2006, 2009–2012); Chicago Bulls (2006–2008); Cleveland Cavaliers (2008–2009) | 2,137 | 1,088 | 1.96 |
| 16 | Shawn Bradley | C | Philadelphia 76ers (1993–1995); New Jersey Nets (1995–1997); Dallas Mavericks (1997–2005) | 2,119 | 832 | 2.55 |
| 17 | Manute Bol | C | Washington Bullets (1985–1988, 1994); Golden State Warriors (1988–1990, 1994–1995); Philadelphia 76ers (1990–1993, 1994); Miami Heat (1993–1994) | 2,086 | 624 | 3.34 |
| 18 | George T. Johnson | C | Golden State Warriors (1972–1973); Golden State Warriors (1973–1977); Buffalo Braves (1977); New Jersey Nets (1977–1980, 1984–1985); San Antonio Spurs (1980–1982); Atlanta Hawks (1982–1983); Seattle SuperSonics (1985–1986) | 2,082 | 848 | 2.46 |
| 19 | Kevin Garnett* | PF | Minnesota Timberwolves (1995–2007, 2015–2016); Boston Celtics (2007–2013); Brooklyn Nets (2013–2015) | 2,037 | 1,462 | 1.39 |
| 20 | Larry Nance | PF | Phoenix Suns (1981–1988); Cleveland Cavaliers (1988–1994) | 2,027 | 920 | 2.20 |
| 21 | Theo Ratliff | C | Detroit Pistons (1995–1997, 2008); Philadelphia 76ers (1997–2001, 2008–2009); Atlanta Hawks (2001–2004); Portland Trail Blazers (2004–2006); Boston Celtics (2006–2007); Minnesota Timberwolves (2007–2008); San Antonio Spurs (2009–2010); Charlotte Bobcats (2010); Los Angeles Lakers (2010–2011) | 1,968 | 810 | 2.43 |
| 22 | Pau Gasol* | PF/C | Memphis Grizzlies (2001–2008); Los Angeles Lakers (2008–2014); Chicago Bulls (2014–2016); San Antonio Spurs (2016–2019); Milwaukee Bucks (2019) | 1,941 | 1,226 | 1.58 |
| 23 | Anthony Davis^ | PF/C | New Orleans Hornets/Pelicans (2012–2019); Los Angeles Lakers (2019–2025); Dallas Mavericks (2025–2026); Washington Wizards (2026–present) | 1,865 | 821 | 2.27 |
| 24 | Rudy Gobert^ | C | Utah Jazz (2013–2022); Minnesota Timberwolves (2022–present) | 1,856 | 919 | 2.02 |
| 25 | Elton Brand | PF/C | Chicago Bulls (1999–2001); Los Angeles Clippers (2001–2008); Philadelphia 76ers (2008–2012, 2016); Dallas Mavericks (2012–2013); Atlanta Hawks (2013–2015) | 1,828 | 1,058 | 1.73 |
| 26 | Jermaine O'Neal | C/PF | Portland Trail Blazers (1996–2000); Indiana Pacers (2000–2008); Toronto Raptors (2008–2009); Miami Heat (2009–2010); Boston Celtics (2010–2012); Phoenix Suns (2012–2013); Golden State Warriors (2013–2014) | 1,820 | 1,011 | 1.80 |
| 27 | Elvin Hayes* | PF/C | San Diego/Houston Rockets (1968–1972); Baltimore Bullets (1972–1973); Capital/Washington Bullets (1973–1981); Houston Rockets (1981–1984) | 1,771 | 894 | 1.98 |
| 28 | Serge Ibaka | PF | Oklahoma City Thunder (2009–2016); Orlando Magic (2016–2017); Toronto Raptors (2017–2020); Los Angeles Clippers (2020–2022); Milwaukee Bucks (2022–2023) | 1,759 | 919 | 1.91 |
| 29 | Artis Gilmore* | C | Chicago Bulls (1976–1982, 1987); San Antonio Spurs (1982–1987); Boston Celtics (1988) | 1,747 | 909 | 1.92 |
| 30 | Moses Malone* | C | Buffalo Braves (1976); Houston Rockets (1976–1982); Philadelphia 76ers (1982–1986, 1993–1994); Washington Bullets (1986–1988); Atlanta Hawks (1988–1991); Milwaukee Bucks (1991–1993); San Antonio Spurs (1994–1995) | 1,733 | 1,329 | 1.30 |
| 31 | Josh Smith | PF/SF | Atlanta Hawks (2004–2013); Detroit Pistons (2013–2014); Houston Rockets (2014–2015, 2016); Los Angeles Clippers (2015–2016); New Orleans Pelicans (2017) | 1,713 | 894 | 1.92 |
| 32 | Kevin McHale* | PF | Boston Celtics (1980–1993) | 1,690 | 972 | 1.74 |
| 33 | Vlade Divac* | C | Los Angeles Lakers (1989–1996, 2004–2005); Charlotte Hornets (1996–1998); Sacramento Kings (1999–2004) | 1,631 | 1,134 | 1.44 |
| 34 | Herb Williams | C/PF | Indiana Pacers (1981–1989); Dallas Mavericks (1989–1992); New York Knicks (1992–1996, 1996–1999); Toronto Raptors (1996) | 1,605 | 1,102 | 1.46 |
| 35 | Elden Campbell | PF/C | Los Angeles Lakers (1990–1999); Charlotte Hornets (1999–2002); New Orleans Hornets (2002–2003); Seattle SuperSonics (2003); Detroit Pistons (2003–2005, 2005); New Jersey Nets (2005) | 1,602 | 1,044 | 1.53 |
| 36 | Benoit Benjamin | C | Los Angeles Clippers (1985–1991); Seattle SuperSonics (1991–1993); Los Angeles Lakers (1993); New Jersey Nets (1993–1995); Vancouver Grizzlies (1995); Milwaukee Bucks (1995–1996); Toronto Raptors (1996); Philadelphia 76ers (1998–1999); Cleveland Cavaliers (1999) | 1,581 | 807 | 1.96 |
| 37 | DeAndre Jordan^ | C | Los Angeles Clippers (2008–2018); Dallas Mavericks (2018–2019); New York Knicks (2019); Brooklyn Nets (2019–2021); Los Angeles Lakers (2021–2022); Philadelphia 76ers (2022); Denver Nuggets (2022–2025); New Orleans Pelicans (2025–present) | 1,580 | 1,128 | 1.40 |
| 38 | Myles Turner^ | C | Indiana Pacers (2015–2025); Milwaukee Bucks (2025–present) | 1,557 | 727 | 2.14 |
| 39 | Samuel Dalembert | C | Philadelphia 76ers (2001–2010); Sacramento Kings (2010–2011); Houston Rockets (2011–2012); Milwaukee Bucks (2012–2013); Dallas Mavericks (2013–2014); New York Knicks (2014–2015) | 1,546 | 886 | 1.75 |
| 40 | Wayne Cooper | C | Golden State Warriors (1978–1980); Utah Jazz (1980–1981); Dallas Mavericks (1981–1982); Portland Trail Blazers (1982–1984, 1989–1992); Denver Nuggets (1984–1989) | 1,535 | 984 | 1.56 |
| 41 | Caldwell Jones | C/PF | Philadelphia 76ers (1976–1982); Houston Rockets (1982–1984); Chicago Bulls (1984–1985); Portland Trail Blazers (1985–1989); San Antonio Spurs (1989–1990) | 1,517 | 1,068 | 1.42 |
| 42 | Alton Lister | C | Milwaukee Bucks (1981–1986, 1994–1995); Seattle SuperSonics (1986–1989); Golden State Warriors (1989–1993); Boston Celtics (1995–1997); Portland Trail Blazers (1997–1998) | 1,473 | 953 | 1.55 |
| 43 | Andrei Kirilenko | SF/PF | Utah Jazz (2001–2011); Minnesota Timberwolves (2012–2013); Brooklyn Nets (2013–2014) | 1,461 | 797 | 1.83 |
| 44 | Rasheed Wallace | PF/C | Washington Bullets (1995–1996); Portland Trail Blazers (1996–2004); Atlanta Hawks (2004); Detroit Pistons (2004–2009); Boston Celtics (2009–2010); New York Knicks (2012–2013) | 1,460 | 1,109 | 1.32 |
| 45 | Hot Rod Williams | C/PF | Cleveland Cavaliers (1986–1995); Phoenix Suns (1995–1998); Dallas Mavericks (1999) | 1,456 | 887 | 1.64 |
| 46 | Mark West | C | Dallas Mavericks (1983–1984); Milwaukee Bucks (1984); Cleveland Cavaliers (1984–1988, 1996–1997); Phoenix Suns (1988–1994, 1999–2000); Detroit Pistons (1994–1996); Indiana Pacers (1997–1998); Atlanta Hawks (1999) | 1,403 | 1,090 | 1.29 |
| 47 | Erick Dampier | C | Indiana Pacers (1996–1997); Golden State Warriors (1997–2004); Dallas Mavericks (2004–2010); Miami Heat (2010–2011); Atlanta Hawks (2012) | 1,398 | 987 | 1.42 |
| 48 | Clifford Robinson | PF/SF | Portland Trail Blazers (1989–1997); Phoenix Suns (1997–2001); Detroit Pistons (2001–2003); Golden State Warriors (2003–2005); New Jersey Nets (2005–2007) | 1,390 | 1,380 | 1.01 |
| 49 | Al Horford^ | C | Atlanta Hawks (2007–2016); Boston Celtics (2016–2019, 2021–2025); Philadelphia 76ers (2019–2020); Oklahoma City Thunder (2020–2021); Golden State Warriors (2025–present) | 1,363 | 1,195 | 1.14 |
| 50 | Kevin Durant^ | SF/PF | Seattle SuperSonics/Oklahoma City Thunder (2007–2016); Golden State Warriors (2016–2019); Brooklyn Nets (2019–2023); Phoenix Suns (2023–2025); Houston Rockets (2025–present) | 1,360 | 1,217 | 1.12 |

== Progressive list for blocks ==
This is a progressive list of blocked shot leaders showing how the record has increased through the years.

| ^ | Active NBA player |
| * | Inducted into the Naismith Memorial Basketball Hall of Fame |

Statistics accurate as of November 18, 2026.

Team abbreviationsTeam listed is the one player was on when he established the record.
| ATL | Atlanta Hawks | DEN | Denver Nuggets | LAL | Los Angeles Lakers | NYK | New York Knicks | TOR | Toronto Raptors |
| BOS | Boston Celtics | DET | Detroit Pistons | MEM | Memphis Grizzlies | OKC | Oklahoma City Thunder | WAS | Washington Wizards |
| CHI | Chicago Bulls | GSW | Golden State Warriors | MIA | Miami Heat | ORL | Orlando Magic | WSB | Washington Bullets |
| CHO | Charlotte Hornets | HOU | Houston Rockets | MIL | Milwaukee Bucks | POR | Portland Trail Blazers | | |
| CLE | Cleveland Cavaliers | IND | Indiana Pacers | NJN | New Jersey Nets | SAS | San Antonio Spurs | | |
| DAL | Dallas Mavericks | LAC | Los Angeles Clippers | NOP | New Orleans Pelicans | UTA | Utah Jazz | | |

Career block leaders at the end of every season
| Season | Year-by-year leader | Blk | Active leader | Blk | Career record | Blk | Single season record | Blk | Season |
|---|---|---|---|---|---|---|---|---|---|
| 1973–74 | Elmore SmithLAL | 393 | Elmore SmithLAL | 393 | Elmore SmithLAL | 393 | Elmore SmithLAL | 393 | 1973–74 |
| 1974–75 | Elmore SmithLAL | 216 | Elmore SmithLAL | 609 | Elmore SmithLAL | 609 | Elmore SmithLAL | 393 | 1974–75 |
| 1975–76 | Kareem Abdul-Jabbar*; LAL | 338 | Elmore SmithLAL | 847 | Elmore SmithLAL | 847 | Elmore SmithLAL | 393 | 1975–76 |
| 1976–77 | Kareem Abdul-Jabbar*; LAL | 261 | Kareem Abdul-Jabbar*; LAL | 1,094 | Kareem Abdul-Jabbar*; LAL | 1,094 | Elmore SmithLAL | 393 | 1976–77 |
| 1977–78 | George JohnsonNJN | 274 | Kareem Abdul-Jabbar*; LAL | 1,279 | Kareem Abdul-Jabbar*; LAL | 1,279 | Elmore SmithLAL | 393 | 1977–78 |
| 1978–79 | Kareem Abdul-Jabbar*; LAL | 316 | Kareem Abdul-Jabbar*; LAL | 1,595 | Kareem Abdul-Jabbar*; LAL | 1,595 | Elmore SmithLAL | 393 | 1978–79 |
| 1979–80 | Kareem Abdul-Jabbar*; LAL | 280 | Kareem Abdul-Jabbar*; LAL | 1,875 | Kareem Abdul-Jabbar*; LAL | 1,875 | Elmore SmithLAL | 393 | 1979–80 |
| 1980–81 | George JohnsonSAS | 278 | Kareem Abdul-Jabbar*; LAL | 2,103 | Kareem Abdul-Jabbar*; LAL | 2,103 | Elmore SmithLAL | 393 | 1980–81 |
| 1981–82 | George JohnsonSAS | 234 | Kareem Abdul-Jabbar*; LAL | 2,310 | Kareem Abdul-Jabbar*; LAL | 2,310 | Elmore SmithLAL | 393 | 1981–82 |
| 1982–83 | Tree RollinsATL | 343 | Kareem Abdul-Jabbar*; LAL | 2,480 | Kareem Abdul-Jabbar*; LAL | 2,480 | Elmore SmithLAL | 393 | 1982–83 |
| 1983–84 | Mark EatonUTA | 351 | Kareem Abdul-Jabbar*; LAL | 2,623 | Kareem Abdul-Jabbar*; LAL | 2,623 | Elmore SmithLAL | 393 | 1983–84 |
| 1984–85 | Mark EatonUTA | 456 | Kareem Abdul-Jabbar*; LAL | 2,785 | Kareem Abdul-Jabbar*; LAL | 2,785 | Mark EatonUTA | 456 | 1984–85 |
| 1985–86 | Manute BolWSB | 397 | Kareem Abdul-Jabbar*; LAL | 2,915 | Kareem Abdul-Jabbar*; LAL | 2,915 | Mark EatonUTA | 456 | 1985–86 |
| 1986–87 | Mark EatonUTA | 321 | Kareem Abdul-Jabbar*; LAL | 3,012 | Kareem Abdul-Jabbar*; LAL | 3,012 | Mark EatonUTA | 456 | 1986–87 |
| 1987–88 | Mark EatonUTA | 304 | Kareem Abdul-Jabbar*; LAL | 3,104 | Kareem Abdul-Jabbar*; LAL | 3,104 | Mark EatonUTA | 456 | 1987–88 |
| 1988–89 | Manute BolGSW | 345 | Kareem Abdul-Jabbar*; LAL | 3,189 | Kareem Abdul-Jabbar*; LAL | 3,189 | Mark EatonUTA | 456 | 1988–89 |
| 1989–90 | Hakeem Olajuwon* HOU | 376 | Mark EatonUTA | 2,592 | Kareem Abdul-Jabbar*; LAL | 3,189 | Mark EatonUTA | 456 | 1989–90 |
| 1990–91 | David Robinson*SAS | 320 | Mark EatonUTA | 2,780 | Kareem Abdul-Jabbar*; LAL | 3,189 | Mark EatonUTA | 456 | 1990–91 |
| 1991–92 | David Robinson*SAS | 305 | Mark EatonUTA | 2,985 | Kareem Abdul-Jabbar*; LAL | 3,189 | Mark EatonUTA | 456 | 1991–92 |
| 1992–93 | Hakeem Olajuwon* HOU | 342 | Mark EatonUTA | 3,064 | Kareem Abdul-Jabbar*; LAL | 3,189 | Mark EatonUTA | 456 | 1992–93 |
| 1993–94 | Dikembe Mutombo*; DEN 1993–96; ATL 1996–98 | 336 | Hakeem Olajuwon*; HOU 1993–2001; TOR 2001–02 | 2,741 | Kareem Abdul-Jabbar*; LAL | 3,189 | Mark EatonUTA | 456 | 1993–94 |
| 1994–95 | Dikembe Mutombo*; DEN 1993–96; ATL 1996–98 | 321 | Hakeem Olajuwon*; HOU 1993–2001; TOR 2001–02 | 2,983 | Kareem Abdul-Jabbar*; LAL | 3,189 | Mark EatonUTA | 456 | 1994–95 |
| 1995–96 | Dikembe Mutombo*; DEN 1993–96; ATL 1996–98 | 332 | Hakeem Olajuwon*; HOU 1993–2001; TOR 2001–02 | 3,190 | Hakeem Olajuwon*; HOU 1984–2001; TOR 2001–02 | 3,190 | Mark EatonUTA | 456 | 1995–96 |
| 1996–97 | Dikembe Mutombo*; DEN 1993–96; ATL 1996–98 | 264 | Hakeem Olajuwon*; HOU 1993–2001; TOR 2001–02 | 3,363 | Hakeem Olajuwon*; HOU 1984–2001; TOR 2001–02 | 3,363 | Mark EatonUTA | 456 | 1996–97 |
| 1997–98 | Dikembe Mutombo*; DEN 1993–96; ATL 1996–98 | 277 | Hakeem Olajuwon*; HOU 1993–2001; TOR 2001–02 | 3,459 | Hakeem Olajuwon*; HOU 1984–2001; TOR 2001–02 | 3,459 | Mark EatonUTA | 456 | 1997–98 |
| 1998–99 | Alonzo Mourning*MIA | 180 | Hakeem Olajuwon*; HOU 1993–2001; TOR 2001–02 | 3,582 | Hakeem Olajuwon*; HOU 1984–2001; TOR 2001–02 | 3,582 | Mark EatonUTA | 456 | 1998–99 |
| 1999–00 | Alonzo Mourning*MIA | 294 | Hakeem Olajuwon*; HOU 1993–2001; TOR 2001–02 | 3,652 | Hakeem Olajuwon*; HOU 1984–2001; TOR 2001–02 | 3,652 | Mark EatonUTA | 456 | 1999–00 |
| 2000–01 | Jermaine O'NealIND Shawn BradleyDAL | 228 | Hakeem Olajuwon*; HOU 1993–2001; TOR 2001–02 | 3,740 | Hakeem Olajuwon*; HOU 1984–2001; TOR 2001–02 | 3,740 | Mark EatonUTA | 456 | 2000–01 |
| 2001–02 | Ben Wallace*DET | 278 | Hakeem Olajuwon*; HOU 1993–2001; TOR 2001–02 | 3,830 | Hakeem Olajuwon*; HOU 1984–2001; TOR 2001–02 | 3,830 | Mark EatonUTA | 456 | 2001–02 |
| 2002–03 | Theo Ratliff; ATL 2002–04; POR 2004 | 262 | David Robinson*SAS | 2,954 | Hakeem Olajuwon*; HOU 1984–2001; TOR 2001–02 | 3,830 | Mark EatonUTA | 456 | 2002–03 |
| 2003–04 | Theo Ratliff; ATL 2002–04; POR 2004 | 307 | Dikembe Mutombo*; NYK 2003–04; HOU 2004–09 | 2,996 | Hakeem Olajuwon*; HOU 1984–2001; TOR 2001–02 | 3,830 | Mark EatonUTA | 456 | 2003–04 |
| 2004–05 | Marcus CambyDEN | 199 | Dikembe Mutombo*; NYK 2003–04; HOU 2004–09 | 3,097 | Hakeem Olajuwon*; HOU 1984–2001; TOR 2001–02 | 3,830 | Mark EatonUTA | 456 | 2004–05 |
| 2005–06 | Andrei KirilenkoUTA | 220 | Dikembe Mutombo*; NYK 2003–04; HOU 2004–09 | 3,154 | Hakeem Olajuwon*; HOU 1984–2001; TOR 2001–02 | 3,830 | Mark EatonUTA | 456 | 2005–06 |
| 2006–07 | Marcus CambyDEN | 231 | Dikembe Mutombo*; NYK 2003–04; HOU 2004–09 | 3,230 | Hakeem Olajuwon*; HOU 1984–2001; TOR 2001–02 | 3,830 | Mark EatonUTA | 456 | 2006–07 |
| 2007–08 | Marcus CambyDEN | 285 | Dikembe Mutombo*; NYK 2003–04; HOU 2004–09 | 3,278 | Hakeem Olajuwon*; HOU 1984–2001; TOR 2001–02 | 3,830 | Mark EatonUTA | 456 | 2007–08 |
| 2008–09 | Dwight Howard*ORL | 231 | Dikembe Mutombo*; NYK 2003–04; HOU 2004–09 | 3,289 | Hakeem Olajuwon*; HOU 1984–2001; TOR 2001–02 | 3,830 | Mark EatonUTA | 456 | 2008–09 |
| 2009–10 | Dwight Howard*ORL | 228 | Shaquille O'Neal*; CLE 2009–10; BOS 2010–11 | 2,690 | Hakeem Olajuwon*; HOU 1984–2001; TOR 2001–02 | 3,830 | Mark EatonUTA | 456 | 2009–10 |
| 2010–11 | Serge IbakaOKC | 198 | Shaquille O'Neal*; CLE 2009–10; BOS 2010–11 | 2,732 | Hakeem Olajuwon*; HOU 1984–2001; TOR 2001–02 | 3,830 | Mark EatonUTA | 456 | 2010–11 |
| 2011–12 | Serge IbakaOKC | 241 | Tim Duncan*SAS | 2,469 | Hakeem Olajuwon*; HOU 1984–2001; TOR 2001–02 | 3,830 | Mark EatonUTA | 456 | 2011–12 |
| 2012–13 | Serge IbakaOKC | 242 | Tim Duncan*SAS | 2,652 | Hakeem Olajuwon*; HOU 1984–2001; TOR 2001–02 | 3,830 | Mark EatonUTA | 456 | 2012–13 |
| 2013–14 | Serge IbakaOKC | 219 | Tim Duncan*SAS | 2,791 | Hakeem Olajuwon*; HOU 1984–2001; TOR 2001–02 | 3,830 | Mark EatonUTA | 456 | 2013–14 |
| 2014–15 | Anthony Davis^NOP | 200 | Tim Duncan*SAS | 2,941 | Hakeem Olajuwon*; HOU 1984–2001; TOR 2001–02 | 3,830 | Mark EatonUTA | 456 | 2014–15 |
| 2015–16 | Hassan WhitesideMIA | 269 | Tim Duncan*SAS | 3,020 | Hakeem Olajuwon*; HOU 1984–2001; TOR 2001–02 | 3,830 | Mark EatonUTA | 456 | 2015–16 |
| 2016–17 | Rudy Gobert^UTA | 214 | Dwight Howard*; ATL 2016–17; CHO 2017–18; WAS 2018–19; LAL 2019–20; PHI 2020–21; LAL 2021–22 | 1,916 | Hakeem Olajuwon*; HOU 1984–2001; TOR 2001–02 | 3,830 | Mark EatonUTA | 456 | 2016–17 |
| 2017–18 | Anthony Davis^NOP | 193 | Dwight Howard*; ATL 2016–17; CHO 2017–18; WAS 2018–19; LAL 2019–20; PHI 2020–21; LAL 2021–22 | 2,047 | Hakeem Olajuwon*; HOU 1984–2001; TOR 2001–02 | 3,830 | Mark EatonUTA | 456 | 2017–18 |
| 2018–19 | Myles Turner^IND | 199 | Dwight Howard*; ATL 2016–17; CHO 2017–18; WAS 2018–19; LAL 2019–20; PHI 2020–21; LAL 2021–22 | 2,051 | Hakeem Olajuwon*; HOU 1984–2001; TOR 2001–02 | 3,830 | Mark EatonUTA | 456 | 2018–19 |
| 2019–20 | Hassan WhitesidePOR | 196 | Dwight Howard*; ATL 2016–17; CHO 2017–18; WAS 2018–19; LAL 2019–20; PHI 2020–21; LAL 2021–22 | 2,130 | Hakeem Olajuwon*; HOU 1984–2001; TOR 2001–02 | 3,830 | Mark EatonUTA | 456 | 2019–20 |
| 2020–21 | Rudy Gobert^UTA | 190 | Dwight Howard*; ATL 2016–17; CHO 2017–18; WAS 2018–19; LAL 2019–20; PHI 2020–21; LAL 2021–22 | 2,192 | Hakeem Olajuwon*; HOU 1984–2001; TOR 2001–02 | 3,830 | Mark EatonUTA | 456 | 2020–21 |
| 2021–22 | Jaren Jackson Jr.^MEM | 177 | Dwight Howard*; ATL 2016–17; CHO 2017–18; WAS 2018–19; LAL 2019–20; PHI 2020–21; LAL 2021–22 | 2,228 | Hakeem Olajuwon*; HOU 1984–2001; TOR 2001–02 | 3,830 | Mark EatonUTA | 456 | 2021–22 |
| 2022–23 | Brook Lopez^MIL | 193 | Serge IbakaMIL | 1,759 | Hakeem Olajuwon*; HOU 1984–2001; TOR 2001–02 | 3,830 | Mark EatonUTA | 456 | 2022–23 |
| 2023–24 | Victor Wembanyama^SAS | 254 | Brook Lopez^ MIL 2023–25; LAC 2025– | 1,912 | Hakeem Olajuwon*; HOU 1984–2001; TOR 2001–02 | 3,830 | Mark EatonUTA | 456 | 2023–24 |
| 2024–25 | Victor Wembanyama^SAS | 176 | Brook Lopez^ MIL 2023–25; LAC 2025– | 2,060 | Hakeem Olajuwon*; HOU 1984–2001; TOR 2001–02 | 3,830 | Mark EatonUTA | 456 | 2024–25 |
| 2025–26 | Victor Wembanyama^SAS | 197 | Brook Lopez^ MIL 2023–25; LAC 2025– | 2,147 | Hakeem Olajuwon*; HOU 1984–2001; TOR 2001–02 | 3,830 | Mark EatonUTA | 456 | 2025–26 |
| 2026–27 | Victor Wembanyama^SAS | 61 | Brook Lopez^ MIL 2023–25; LAC 2025– | 2,159 | Hakeem Olajuwon*; HOU 1984–2001; TOR 2001–02 | 3,830 | Mark EatonUTA | 456 | 2026–27 |
| Season | Year-by-year Leader | Blk | Active leader | Blk | Career record | Blk | Single season record | Blk | Season |

== See also ==
- Basketball statistics
- NBA regular season records
