= Ask the Doctor =

Ask the Doctor may refer to:

- Ask the Doctor (website)
- Ask the Doctor (TV series)
