= Dikembe Mutombo =

Congolese-American basketball player (1966–2024)

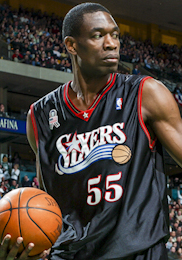
- Mutombo with the Philadelphia 76ers in 2002

Personal information
- Born: June 25, 1966 Kinshasa, Democratic Republic of the Congo (Note: Kinshasa was renamed in May of 1966, Democratic Republic of the Congo was the official name of the country until 1971 when it was changed to Zaire.)
- Died: September 30, 2024 (aged 58) Atlanta, Georgia, U.S.
- Listed height: 7 ft 2 in (2.18 m)
- Listed weight: 260 lb (118 kg)

Career information
- High school: Institute Boboto (Kinshasa, DR Congo)
- College: Georgetown (1988–1991)
- NBA draft: 1991: 1st round, 4th overall pick
- Drafted by: Denver Nuggets
- Playing career: 1991–2009
- Position: Center
- Number: 55

Career history
- 1991–1996: Denver Nuggets
- 1996–2001: Atlanta Hawks
- 2001–2002: Philadelphia 76ers
- 2002–2003: New Jersey Nets
- 2003–2004: New York Knicks
- 2004–2009: Houston Rockets

Career highlights
- 8× NBA All-Star (1992, 1995–1998, 2000–2002); All-NBA Second Team (2001); 2× All-NBA Third Team (1998, 2002); 4× NBA Defensive Player of the Year (1995, 1997, 1998, 2001); 3× NBA All-Defensive First Team (1997, 1998, 2001); 3× NBA All-Defensive Second Team (1995, 1999, 2002); NBA All-Rookie First Team (1992); 2× NBA rebounding leader (2000, 2001); 3× NBA blocks leader (1994–1996); No. 55 retired by Atlanta Hawks; No. 55 retired by Denver Nuggets; Third-team All-American – AP, UPI (1991); First-team All-Big East (1991); Second-team All-Big East (1990); 2× Big East Defensive Player of the Year (1990, 1991); 2× Big East All-Defensive team (1990, 1991)

Career NBA statistics
- Points: 11,729 (9.8 ppg)
- Rebounds: 12,359 (10.3 rpg)
- Blocks: 3,289 (2.8 bpg)
- Stats at NBA.com
- Stats at Basketball Reference
- Basketball Hall of Fame

Dikembe Mutombo Mpolondo Mukamba Jean-Jacques Wamutombo (June 25, 1966 – September 30, 2024) was a Congolese-American professional basketball player who played center in the National Basketball Association (NBA) for 18 seasons. Nicknamed "Mt. Mutombo", he is commonly regarded as one of the best shot-blockers and defensive players of all time. Outside of basketball, he was known for his humanitarian work.

A 7-foot-2-inch (2.18 m) center, Mutombo moved to the United States from the Democratic Republic of the Congo at age 21 to attend Georgetown University with the hope of eventually earning a medical degree and returning to the DRC to practice medicine. Those plans changed when John Thompson, coach of the Georgetown Hoyas, recruited him to play college basketball. Mutombo played three seasons for Georgetown, establishing a reputation as a tenacious defender.

In 1991, the Denver Nuggets chose him with the fourth overall pick of the NBA draft. During his NBA career, he played for six teams, in the NBA Finals for the Philadelphia 76ers in 2001 and for the New Jersey Nets in 2003. He received the NBA Defensive Player of the Year Award four times, tied with Ben Wallace and Rudy Gobert for the most awards. He led the NBA in blocked shots three times, led the league in rebounds twice, and was named to eight All-Star teams. Mutombo, with 3,289 career blocks, ranks second among NBA career leaders in blocked shots.

At the conclusion of the 2009 NBA playoffs, Mutombo retired and his number 55 jersey was retired by the Nuggets and Atlanta Hawks. He was inducted into the Naismith Memorial Basketball Hall of Fame in 2015.

== Early life ==
Dikembe Mutombo Mpolondo Mukamba Jean-Jacques Wamutombo was born on June 25, 1966, in Kinshasa, Democratic Republic of the Congo to Samuel and Biamba Marie Mutombo. Dikembe had 9 siblings. His father worked as a school principal and then in Congo's department of education. Dikembe spoke French, Spanish, Portuguese and five Central African languages including Lingala and Tshiluba. He was a member of the Luba ethnic group.

For high school, Dikembe Mutombo went to Boboto College in Kinshasa to lay the groundwork for his medical career as the classes were more challenging there. He played association football and participated in martial arts. At about 16, Mutombo decided to concentrate on his basketball career at the encouragement of his father and brother due to his height. He moved to the United States in 1987 at the age of 21 to enroll in college.

== College career ==
Mutombo attended Georgetown University on a USAID scholarship. He originally intended to become a doctor, but the Georgetown Hoyas basketball coach John Thompson recruited him to play basketball. He spoke almost no English when he arrived at Georgetown and studied in the ESL program.

During his first year of college basketball as a sophomore, Mutombo once blocked 12 shots in a game. Building on the shot-blocking power of Mutombo and teammate Alonzo Mourning, Georgetown fans created a "Rejection Row" section under the basket, adding a big silhouette of an outstretched hand to a banner for each shot blocked during the game. Mutombo was named the Big East Defensive Player of the Year twice, in 1990 (shared with Mourning) and in 1991.

At Georgetown, Mutombo's international background and interests stood out. Like many other Washington-area college students, he served as a summer intern, once for Robert Matsui, a member of the Congress of the United States from California, and once at the World Bank. In 1991, he graduated with bachelor's degrees in linguistics and diplomacy.

== Professional career ==
=== Denver Nuggets (1991–1996) ===
In the 1991 NBA draft, the Denver Nuggets selected Mutombo with the fourth overall pick. The Nuggets ranked last in the NBA in opponent points-per-game and Defensive Rating, and Mutombo's shot-blocking ability made an immediate impression across the league. He developed his signature move, in which he would celebrate every blocked shot by pointing his right index finger at the opposing player and moving it side to side, in 1992 as a way to become more marketable and gain product-endorsement contracts. That year, Mutombo starred in an Adidas advertisement that used the catchphrase "Man does not fly ... in the house of Mutombo", a reference to his prolific shot-blocking.

As a rookie, Mutombo was selected for the All-Star team and averaged 16.6 points, 12.3 rebounds and nearly three blocks per game. Despite making the All-Star game as a rookie, Mutombo finished second in the Rookie of the Year voting behind Larry Johnson. Nevertheless, Mutombo quickly began to establish himself as one of the league's best defensive players, regularly putting up big rebound and block numbers.

The 1993–94 season saw Denver continue to improve with Mutombo as the franchise cornerstone. During that season, Mutombo averaged 12.0 points per game, 11.8 rebounds per game and 4.1 blocks per game. With that, he helped the Nuggets finish with a 42–40 record and qualify as the eighth seed in the playoffs. They were matched up with the top-seeded 63–19 Seattle SuperSonics in the first round.

After falling to an 0–2 deficit in the five-game series, Denver won three straight games to pull off a major playoff upset, becoming the first eighth seed to defeat a number one seed in an NBA playoff series. At the end of Game 5, Mutombo memorably grabbed the game-winning rebound and fell to the ground, holding the ball over his head in a moment of joy. Mutombo's defensive presence was the key to the upset victory; his total of 31 blocks remains a record for a five-game series. In the second round of the playoffs, the Nuggets fell to the Utah Jazz, 4–3.

The next season, Mutombo was selected for his second All-Star game and received the NBA Defensive Player of the Year Award. Denver failed to build on its success from the previous playoffs, as Mutombo lacked a quality supporting cast around him.

During his last season with the Nuggets, Mutombo averaged 11.0 points per game, 11.8 rebounds per game and a career-high 4.5 blocks per game. At the conclusion of the 1995–96 season, Mutombo became a free agent, and reportedly sought a ten-year contract, something the Nuggets considered impossible to offer. Bernie Bickerstaff, then the Nuggets' general manager, later said not bringing back Mutombo was his biggest regret as GM.

=== Atlanta Hawks (1996–2001) ===
After the 1995–96 NBA season, Mutombo signed a five-year, $55 million free agent contract with the Atlanta Hawks. He and Hawks All-Star Steve Smith led Atlanta to back-to-back 50+-win seasons in 1996–97 (56–26) and 1997–98 (50–32). Mutombo won Defensive Player of the Year both years, continuing to put up excellent defensive numbers with the Hawks.

In the 1997 NBA Playoffs, the Hawks defeated the Detroit Pistons in five games. In Game 1 of that series, Mutombo led all scorers and rebounders, with 26 points and 15 rebounds respectively, in a 89–75 win over the Pistons. In the next round, despite Mutombo averaging a double-double and 2.6 blocks per game, the Hawks lost in five games to the defending champion Chicago Bulls.

The following season, on April 9, 1998, Mutombo scored 20 points and grabbed 24 rebounds in a 105–102 loss to the Indiana Pacers. That season ended in disappointment for Mutombo and the Hawks, as despite finishing with a similar record to the previous season, Mutombo averaged only 8.0 points and 12.8 rebounds a game while the Hawks lost to their division rival Charlotte Hornets three games to one in the first round.

During the lockout-shortened 1998–99 season, he was the NBA's IBM Award winner, a player of the year award determined by a computerized formula. That year, the NBA banned the Mutombo finger wag, and after a period of protest, he complied with the new rule.

In his last full season with the Hawks during the 1999–00 season, Mutombo averaged 11.5 points per game, a career and league-high 14.1 rebounds per game and 3.3 blocks per game. On December 14, 1999, Mutombo scored 27 points, on 11-for-11 shooting from the field, grabbed a season-high 29 rebounds and recorded a game-high six blocks to pull out the win over the Minnesota Timberwolves.

=== Philadelphia 76ers (2001–2002) ===
At the February 2001 trade deadline, the Hawks traded Mutombo to the Eastern Conference-leading Philadelphia 76ers, along with Roshown McLeod, in exchange for Toni Kukoč, future teammates Pepe Sánchez and Nazr Mohammed, and injured center Theo Ratliff. One week earlier, Mutombo played in the All-Star game; he led the game with 22 rebounds and three blocks. Along with game MVP Allen Iverson and coach Larry Brown, both of the 76ers, the East rallied from a 95–74 fourth-quarter deficit to win 111–110 on Mutombo and Iverson's strong performances.

After the game, rumors began of a trade sending Mutombo to Philadelphia. With Ratliff out for the remainder of the year, the Sixers needed a big man to compete with potential matchups against Western Conference powers Vlade Divac, Tim Duncan, David Robinson or Shaquille O'Neal, should they reach the NBA Finals.

Mutombo earned his fourth Defensive Player of the Year award that season. During the 2001 playoffs, they defeated the Indiana Pacers in four games, the Toronto Raptors in seven games and the Milwaukee Bucks in a seven-game series. During Game 7 against the Bucks, Mutombo scored 23 points, grabbed 19 rebounds and blocked seven shots to win the series. Mutombo helped the Sixers reach the NBA Finals. After pulling off an upset and winning Game 1 against the Los Angeles Lakers (the only playoff game the Lakers lost in 2001), the Sixers lost the next four games and the series. Matched up against Shaquille O'Neal, Mutombo averaged 16.8 points, 12.2 rebounds and 2.2 blocks. A free agent, he re-signed with the Sixers after the season to a four-year, $68 million contract.

The 2001–02 season marked the final time in Mutombo's career that he averaged double-digit points or rebounds, as he started 80 games for Philadelphia, although they lost in the first round of the playoffs.

=== New Jersey Nets (2002–2003) ===
On August 7, 2002, the 76ers traded Mutombo to the New Jersey Nets in exchange for Keith Van Horn and Todd MacCulloch. The Nets were coming off a sweep in the Finals where they were overmatched by Shaq, and brought in Mutombo as the missing piece to a championship, similar to what the Sixers did two seasons prior.

Mutombo spent most of the season with a nagging wrist injury that limited him to 24 games. He was generally unable to play in the playoffs, typically serving as a sixth man during the Nets' second consecutive Finals run, in which they lost to the Spurs in six games. After one contentious season in New Jersey, the Nets bought out the remaining two years on his contract.

=== New York Knicks (2003–2004) ===
In October 2003, he signed a two-year deal with the New York Knicks. After a dominant performance against the crosstown rival New Jersey Nets that included 10 blocks, Knicks fans began waving their fingers, as Mutombo once did. He chose to respond in kind after a referee told him that as long as the gesture was not directed at a particular player, the league would not punish him. In August 2004, the Knicks traded him to the Chicago Bulls, along with Cezary Trybański, Othella Harrington and Frank Williams in exchange for Jerome Williams and Jamal Crawford.

=== Houston Rockets (2004–2009) ===
Prior to the 2004–05 season, the Bulls traded Mutombo to the Houston Rockets for Mike Wilks, Eric Piatkowski and Adrian Griffin. Yao Ming and Mutombo formed one of the NBA's most productive center combos. In his first season with the Rockets, Mutombo averaged 15.2 minutes per game, 4.0 points per game, 5.3 rebounds per game and 1.3 blocks per game. The Rockets lost in the first round that year to the Dallas Mavericks.

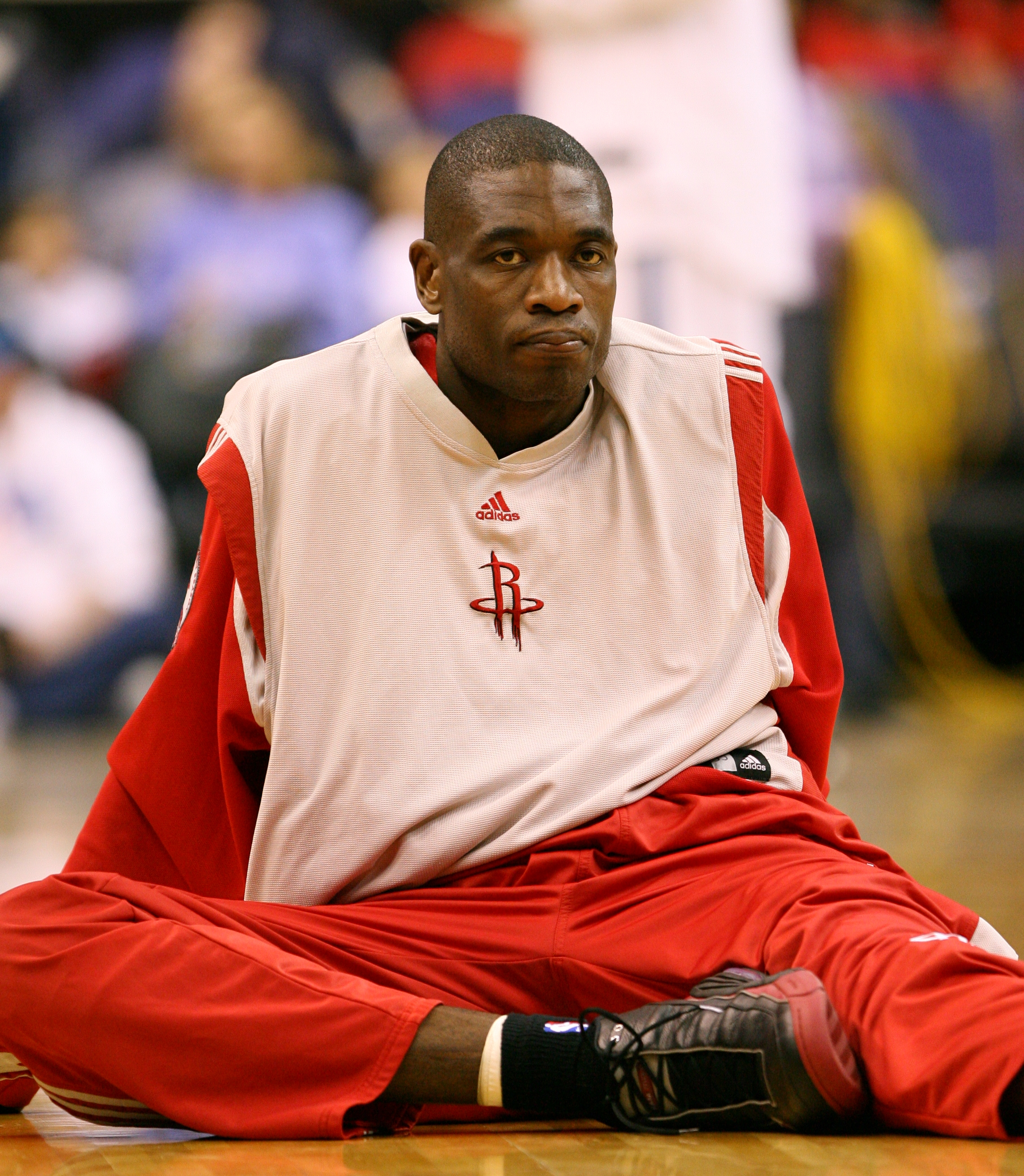
Mutombo with the Houston Rockets in 2006

On January 10, 2007, in a 102–77 rout of the Los Angeles Lakers, Mutombo recorded five blocked shots and surpassed Kareem Abdul-Jabbar in total career blocked shots, trailing only Hakeem Olajuwon.

On March 2, 2007, in a win over the Denver Nuggets at age 40, Mutombo became the oldest player in NBA history to record more than 20 rebounds in a game, with 22. In the 2007–08 season, Mutombo received extensive playing time when Yao went down with a broken bone and averaged double digits in rebounding as a starter. In midst of a 10-game winning streak at the time of Yao's injury, Mutombo stepped in and helped the Rockets win 12 more games to complete a 22-game winning streak, then a team record.

After contemplating retirement and spending the first part of 2008 as an unsigned free agent, on December 31, 2008, Mutombo signed with the Houston Rockets for the remainder of the 2008–09 season. He said that 2009 would be his "farewell tour" and his final season; he was the oldest player in the NBA in 2009. In Game 1 of Houston's first-round playoff series against Portland, Mutombo played for 18 minutes and had nine rebounds, two blocks and a steal.

In the second quarter of Game Two, Mutombo landed awkwardly and had to be carried from the floor. After the game, he said that surgery was needed and that his NBA career was over. It was later confirmed that the quadriceps tendon of his left knee had been ruptured. Mutombo announced his retirement on April 23, 2009, after 18 seasons in the NBA.

== Player profile ==
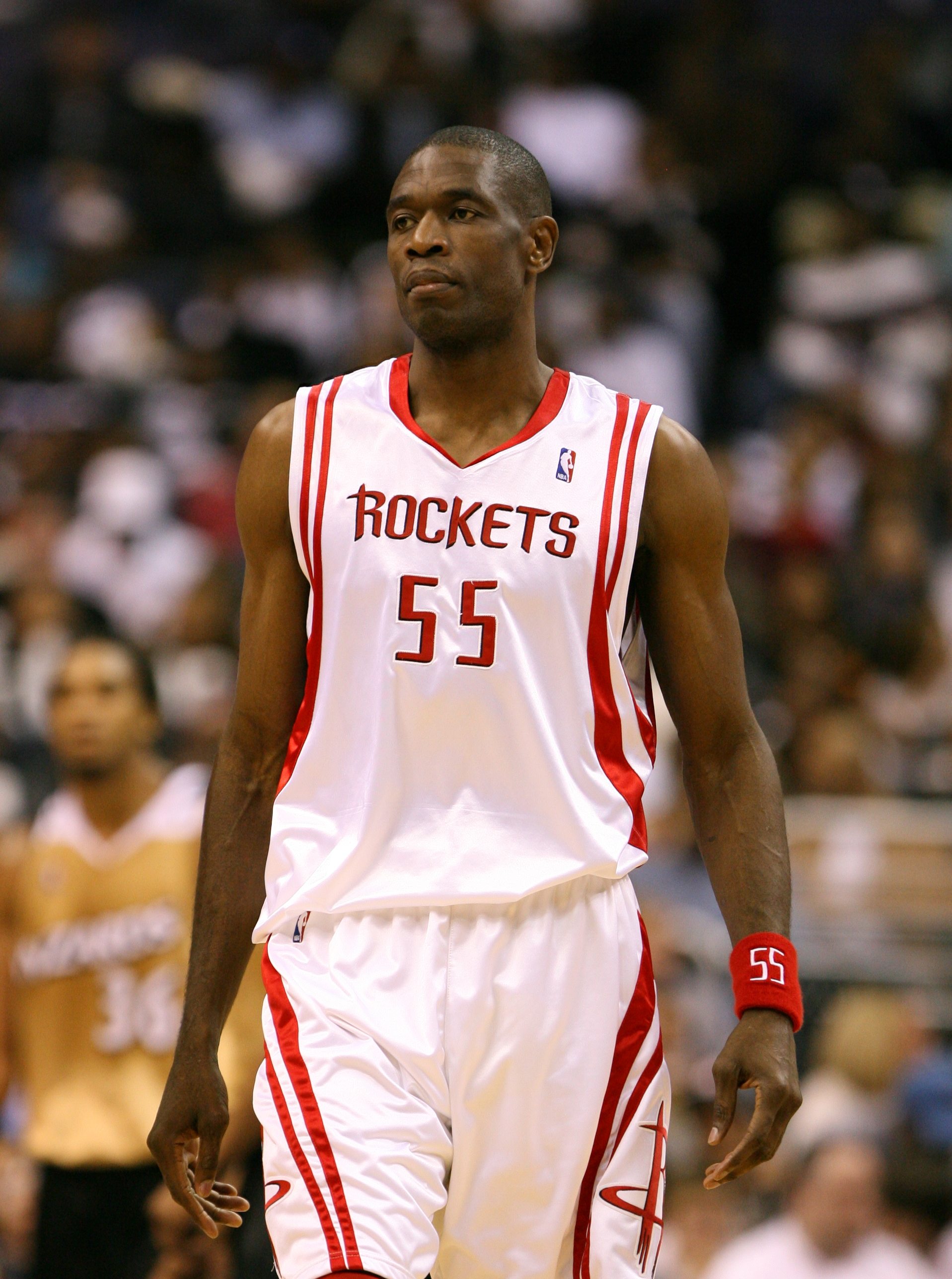
Mutombo playing for the Houston Rockets in 2006

The 7-foot-2-inch (2.18 m), 260-pound (120 kg) Mutombo played center, being regarded as one of the top inside defenders of all time. Nicknamed "Mt. Mutombo", his combination of height, power, and long arms led to a record-tying four NBA Defensive Player of the Year awards, a feat equaled only by Ben Wallace and Rudy Gobert. Mutombo was among the top three players in Defensive Player of the Year voting for nine consecutive seasons from 1994 to 2002. Staples of Mutombo's defensive prowess were his outstanding shot-blocking and rebounding power. Over his career, he averaged 2.8 blocks and 10.3 rebounds per game. Mutombo blocked 3,289 shots; at the time of his death on September 30, 2024, he was second all-time in blocked shots behind Hakeem Olajuwon. Mutombo is the 20th-most-prolific rebounder ever. He was also an eight-time All-Star and was elected into three All-NBA and six All-Defensive Teams. Along with his defensive prowess, Mutombo also contributed offensively, averaging at least 10 points per game until he reached age 35.

Mutombo also achieved a certain level of on-court notoriety. After a successful block, he was known for taunting his opponents by waving his index finger, like a parent reproaching a disobedient child. Later in his career, NBA officials responded to the gesture with a technical foul for unsportsmanlike conduct. To avoid the technical foul, Mutombo took to waving his finger at the crowd or the TV cameras after a block, which is not considered taunting by the rules. Additionally, he was known for injuring several NBA players including Michael Jordan, Dennis Rodman, Charles Oakley, Patrick Ewing, Chauncey Billups, Ray Allen, Yao Ming, LeBron James and Tracy McGrady due to his practice of flailing his elbows. His former teammate Yao Ming made a joke about it: "I need to talk to Coach to have Dikembe held out of practice, because if he hits somebody in practice, it's our teammate. At least in the games, it's 50/50."

The Atlanta Hawks retired Mutombo's number 55 jersey on November 24, 2015, and the Denver Nuggets did the same on October 29, 2016. On September 11, 2015, he was inducted into the Naismith Memorial Basketball Hall of Fame. He received the Sager Strong Award on June 25, 2018.

== Personal life ==
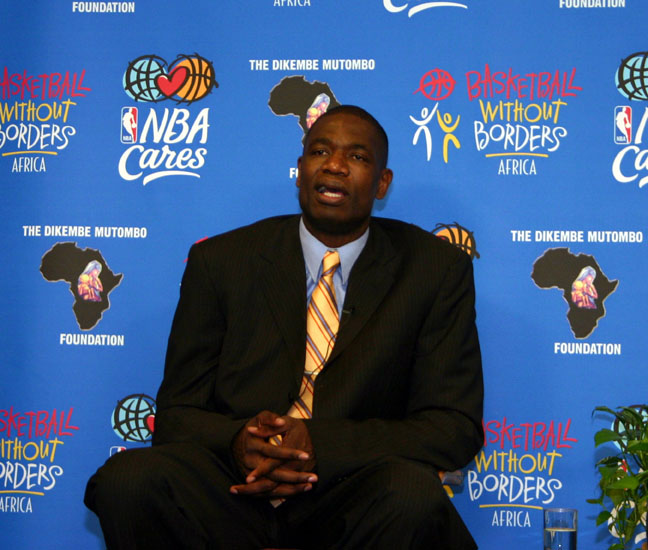
Mutombo speaks at an August 2006 press briefing at the New York Foreign Press Center

In 1987, Mutombo's 6-foot-10-inch (2.08 m) older brother, Ilo, began playing college basketball in Division II for the Southern Indiana Screaming Eagles as a 26-year-old freshman. The brothers played against each other in a 1990 college basketball game at the Capital Centre in Landover, Maryland.

Mutombo met his wife, Rose, during a visit to Kinshasa in 1995. They lived in Atlanta and had three children. They also adopted four children of Rose's deceased brothers. Dikembe and Rose's son, Ryan Mutombo, was ranked as the 16th-best high school center in the United States. In 2021, he committed to play basketball for his father's alma mater, Georgetown, which he did for two seasons.

Two of Mutombo's nephews, Harouna Mutombo and Mfiondu Kabengele, have played professional basketball. Harouna Mutombo was the leading scorer at Western Carolina University for the Catamounts in 2009. He was named Southern Conference Freshman of the Year; he later played professional basketball in Serbia. Mfiondu Kabengele played college basketball at Florida State University and was the 2018–19 ACC Sixth Man of the Year. He was selected in the first round of the 2019 NBA Draft and signed a contract with the Los Angeles Clippers. He played in the NBA for the Clippers, the Cleveland Cavaliers and the Boston Celtics. As of 2023, he played overseas in Europe. Another of Mutombo's nephews, Haboubacar Mutombo, also played basketball for Western Carolina.

Mutombo became a naturalized American citizen in 2006.

Mutombo witnessed the 2016 Brussels bombings at Brussels Airport on March 22, 2016. Shortly after the bombings, he posted a report on his Facebook page saying that he was safe.

=== Death ===
On October 15, 2022, Mutombo's family announced that he was undergoing treatment for a brain tumor. On September 30, 2024, Mutombo died due to brain cancer in Atlanta at the age of 58.

== Media ==
Mutombo made a cameo appearance in the 2002 films Juwanna Mann and Like Mike, which mentioned his name in its theme song "Basketball". In 2012, his voice and likeness were used in a 16-bit-style Flash game released by Old Spice humorously titled Dikembe Mutombo's 4 1/2 Weeks to Save the World.

Mutombo appeared in a GEICO auto insurance commercial in February 2013, parodying his shot-blocking ability by applying it to real world situations. He co-starred with Kevin Harvick in a Mobil 1 commercial for its annual protection brand of motor oil, saying "Don't change your oil." Mutombo had a brief cameo in the 2021 film Coming 2 America as himself.

== Humanitarian work ==
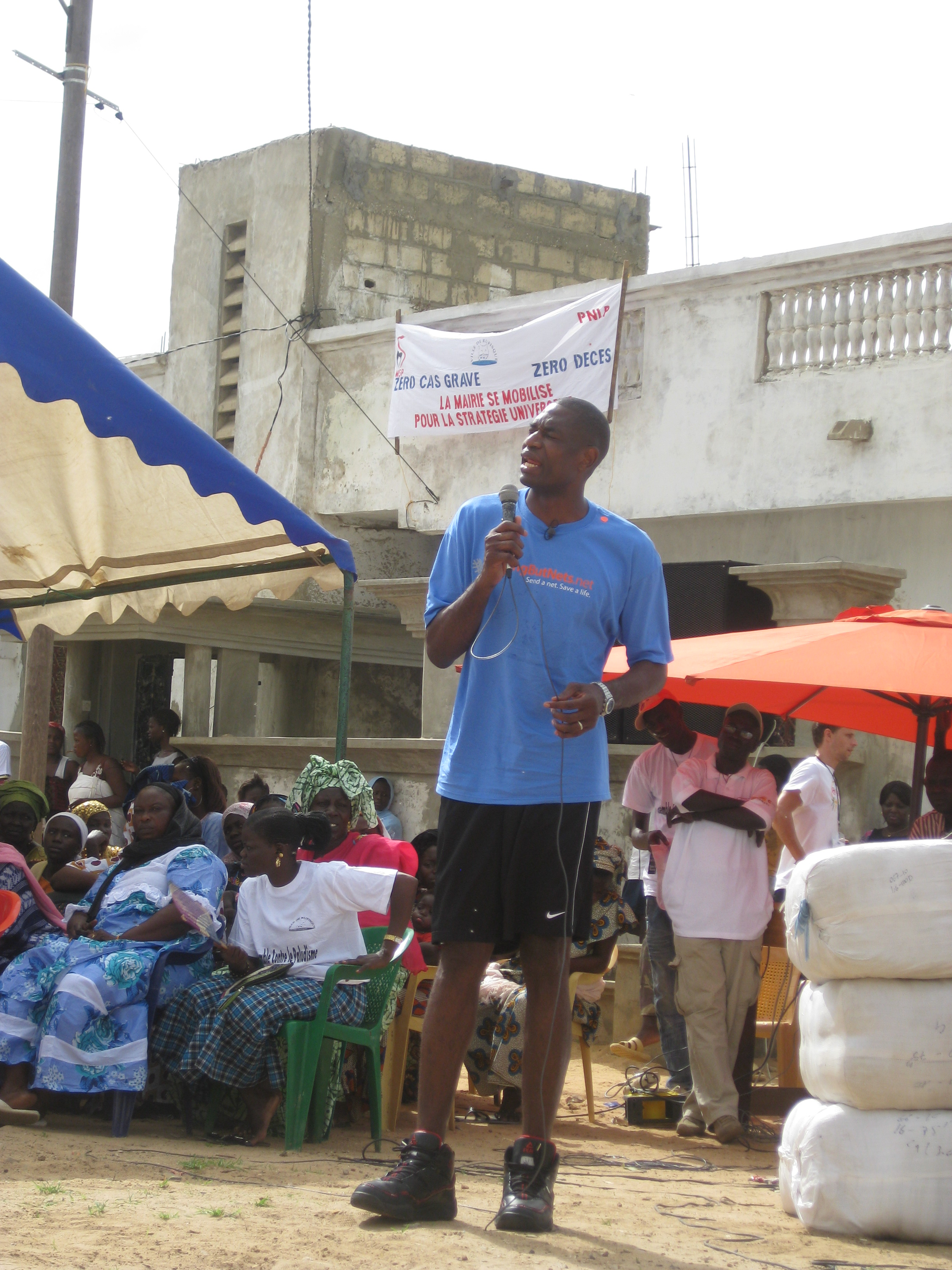
Mutombo speaks to the Senegalese population about the importance of sleeping under mosquito nets

Dikembe Mutombo was a well-known humanitarian. He created the Dikembe Mutombo Foundation to improve living conditions in his native Democratic Republic of Congo in 1997. His work earned him the NBA's J. Walter Kennedy Citizenship Award in 2001 and 2009. For his feats, Sporting News named him as one of the "Good Guys in Sports" in 1999 and 2000. In 1999, he was selected as one of 20 winners of the President's Service Awards, the nation's highest honor for volunteer service.

In 2004, he participated in the Basketball Without Borders NBA program, where NBA stars such as Shawn Bradley, Malik Rose and DeSagana Diop toured Africa to spread the word about basketball and to improve the infrastructure. He paid for uniforms and expenses for the Zaire women's basketball team during the 1996 Centennial Olympic Games in Atlanta. Mutombo was a spokesman for the international relief agency, CARE and was the first youth emissary for the United Nations Development Program.

Mutombo was a longtime supporter of Special Olympics and a member of the Special Olympics International Board of Directors, as well as a Global Ambassador. He was a pioneer of Unified Sports, which brings together people with and without intellectual disabilities. He played in the Unity Cup in South Africa before the 2010 World Cup Quarterfinal, along with South African President Jacob Zuma and Special Olympics athletes from around the world. Mutombo joined his second Unity Cup team in 2012.

Honoring his humanitarianism, Mutombo was invited to President George W. Bush's 2007 State of the Union Address, where the president said: "We are proud to call this son of the Congo a citizen of the United States of America". Mutombo said, "My heart was full of joy. I didn't know the President was going to say such great remarks."

On April 13, 2011, the Johns Hopkins Bloomberg School of Public Health gave Mutombo the Goodermote Humanitarian Award "for his efforts to reduce polio globally as well as his work improving the health of neglected and underserved populations in the Democratic Republic of Congo." Michael J. Klag, dean of the Bloomberg School of Public Health, said "Mr. Mutombo is a winner in many ways—on the court and as a humanitarian. His work has improved the health of the people of the Democratic Republic of the Congo, and the Biamba Marie Mutombo Hospital and Research Center is a model for the region. Likewise, Mr. Mutombo has been instrumental in the fight against polio by bolstering vaccination efforts and bringing treatment to victims of the disease."

In 2020, the Mutombo Foundation began construction of a modern pre-K through 6th-grade school in the Democratic Republic of Congo, named for his father, who died in 2003. The Samuel Mutombo Institute of Science & Entrepreneurship is located outside the city of Mbuji-Mayi.

Mutombo was awarded an honorary doctorate by his alma mater Georgetown University in 2010. He also received an honorary doctorate from Haverford College in May 2011. In November 2015, the National Collegiate Athletic Association (NCAA) announced Mutombo as a recipient of its Silver Anniversary Awards for 2016. The announcement cited both his basketball career and extensive humanitarian work.

In 1997, the Mutombo Foundation began plans to open a $29 million, 300-bed hospital on the outskirts of his hometown, the Congolese capital of Kinshasa. Ground was broken in 2001, but construction didn't start until 2004, as he had trouble getting donations early on although he personally donated $3.5 million toward the hospital's construction. Initially he had other difficulties and almost lost the land to the government because it was not being used and having to pay refugees who had begun farming the land to leave. Mutombo also struggled to reassure some that he did not have any ulterior or political motives for the project. The project has been on the whole very well received at all social and economic levels in Kinshasa. On August 14, 2006, Mutombo donated $15 million to the completion of the hospital for the ceremonial opening on September 2, 2006. By then it was named Biamba Marie Mutombo Hospital, for his late mother, who died of a stroke in 1997. When it opened in 2007, the $29 million facility became the first modern medical facility to be built in that area in nearly 40 years. The hospital is on a 12-acre (49,000 m^{2}) site on the outskirts of Kinshasa in Masina, where about a quarter of the city's 7.5 million residents live in poverty. It is near N'djili Airport and by a busy open-air market.

Mutombo served on the board of trustees of the National Constitution Center in Philadelphia, which is a museum dedicated to the U.S. Constitution.

In 2011, Mutombo traveled to South Sudan as a SportsUnited sports envoy for the US Department of State. He worked with Sam Perkins to lead a series of basketball clinics and team-building exercises with 50 youths and 36 coaches helping contribute to the State Department's mission to remove barriers and create a world in which individuals with disabilities enjoy dignity and full inclusion in society.

In April 2020, Mutombo joined the website Ask the Doctor as their chief global officer. Ask the Doctor is a platform that connects people from all over the world to top doctors and healthcare professionals.

In 2020, Mutombo co-founded the coffee company Mutombo Coffee with businessman Robert C. Bush Jr., aiming to create an ethical and sustainable value chain for coffee sourced from Africa and Latin America.

== Career statistics ==
Legend
GP	Games played	GS	Games started	MPG	Minutes per game
FG%	Field goal percentage	3P%	3-point field goal percentage	FT%	Free throw percentage
RPG	Rebounds per game	APG	Assists per game	SPG	Steals per game
BPG	Blocks per game	PPG	Points per game	**Bold**	Career high
*	Led the league

=== NBA ===
==== Regular season ====
Year	Team	GP	GS	MPG	FG%	3P%	FT%	RPG	APG	SPG	BPG	PPG
1991–92	Denver	71	71	**38.3**	.493	–	.642	12.3	**2.2**	.6	3.0	**16.6**
1992–93	Denver	**82**	**82**	36.9	.510	–	.681	13.0	1.8	.5	3.5	13.8
1993–94	Denver	**82**	**82**	34.8	**.569**	.000	.583	11.8	1.5	**.7**	4.1*	12.0
1994–95	Denver	**82***	**82***	37.8	.556	–	.654	12.5	1.4	.5	3.9*	11.5
1995–96	Denver	74	74	36.7	.499	.000	.695	11.8	1.5	.5	**4.5***	11.0
1996–97	Atlanta	80	80	37.2	.527	–	.705	11.6	1.4	.6	3.3	13.3
1997–98	Atlanta	**82***	**82***	35.6	.537	–	.670	11.4	1.0	.4	3.4	13.4
1998–99	Atlanta	50*	50*	36.6	.512	–	.684	12.2	1.1	.3	2.9	10.8
1999–00	Atlanta	**82**	**82***	36.4	.562	–	.708	**14.1***	1.3	.3	3.3	11.5
2000–01	Atlanta	49	49	35.0	.477	–	.695	**14.1**	1.1	.4	2.8	9.1
2000–01	Philadelphia	26	26	33.7	.495	–	.759	12.4*	.8	.3	2.5	11.7
2001–02	Philadelphia	80	80	36.3	.501	–	**.764**	10.8	1.0	.4	2.4	11.5
2002–03	New Jersey	24	16	21.4	.374	–	.727	6.4	.8	.2	1.5	5.8
2003–04	New York	65	56	23.0	.478	–	.681	6.7	.4	.3	1.9	5.6
2004–05	Houston	80	2	15.2	.498	–	.741	5.3	.1	.2	1.3	4.0
2005–06	Houston	64	23	14.9	.526	–	.758	4.8	.1	.3	.9	2.6
2006–07	Houston	75	33	17.2	.556	–	.690	6.5	.2	.3	1.0	3.1
2007–08	Houston	39	25	15.9	.538	–	.711	5.1	.1	.3	1.2	3.0
2008–09	Houston	9	2	10.7	.385	–	.667	3.7	.0	.0	1.2	1.8
Career		1196	997	30.8	.518	.000	.684	10.3	1.0	.4	2.8	9.8
All-Star		8	3	17.5	.595	–	.750	9.3	.3	.4	1.2	6.3

==== Playoffs ====
Year	Team	GP	GS	MPG	FG%	3P%	FT%	RPG	APG	SPG	BPG	PPG
1994	Denver	12	12	42.6	.463	–	.602	12.0	**1.8**	**.7**	**5.8***	13.3
1995	Denver	3	3	28.0	.600	–	.667	6.3	.3	.0	2.3	6.0
1997	Atlanta	10	10	41.5	.628*	–	.719	12.3	1.3	.1	2.6	**15.4**
1998	Atlanta	4	4	34.0	.458	–	.625	12.8	.3	.3	2.3	8.0
1999	Atlanta	9	9	42.2	.563	–	.702	**13.9***	1.2	.6	2.6	12.6
2001	Philadelphia	**23**	**23**	**42.7**	.490	.000	.777	13.7	.7	.7	3.1*	13.9
2002	Philadelphia	5	5	34.6	.452	–	.615	10.6	.6	.4	1.8	8.8
2003	New Jersey	10	0	11.5	.467	–	**1.000**	2.7	.6	.3	.9	1.8
2004	New York	3	0	12.7	.333	–	**1.000**	3.3	.0	.3	1.3	2.3
2005	Houston	7	0	14.4	.545	–	.769	5.0	.3	.3	1.0	3.1
2007	Houston	7	0	5.7	**1.000**	–	**1.000**	1.6	.1	.0	.4	1.3
2008	Houston	6	6	20.5	.615	–	.636	6.5	.3	.2	1.8	3.8
2009	Houston	2	0	10.0	.000	–	–	4.5	.0	.5	1.0	.0
Career		101	72	30.9	.517	.000	.703	9.5	.8	.4	2.5	9.1

==== College ====
Year	Team	GP	GS	MPG	FG%	3P%	FT%	RPG	APG	SPG	BPG	PPG
1988–89	Georgetown	**33**	0	11.3	.707	–	.479	3.3	.2	.3	2.3	3.9
1989–90	Georgetown	31	24	25.7	**.709**	–	.598	10.5	.6	.4	4.1	10.7
1990–91	Georgetown	32	**32**	**34.1**	.586	–	**.703**	**12.2**	**1.6**	**.6**	**4.7**	**15.2**
Career		96	56	23.6	.644	–	.641	8.6	.8	.4	3.7	9.9

== See also ==
- List of NBA career rebounding leaders
- List of NBA career blocks leaders
- List of NBA career personal fouls leaders
- List of NBA career playoff blocks leaders
- List of NBA annual rebounding leaders
- List of NBA annual blocks leaders
- List of NBA single-game rebounding leaders
- List of NBA single-game blocks leaders
- List of NBA single-season blocks per game leaders
