= IBM Award =

National Basketball Association award

- Sport: Basketball
- League: National Basketball Association
- Awarded for: NBA player with best contribution to his team based on computer formula calculated by IBM

History
- First award: 1983–84
- Most recent: Tim Duncan; San Antonio Spurs (2002)

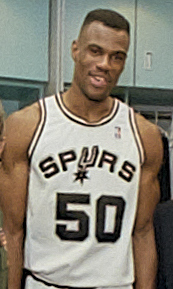
San Antonio Spurs center David Robinson won five IBM Awards.

The IBM Award was an award given out to National Basketball Association players from 1984 to 2002. The award was sponsored and calculated by technology company IBM and was determined by a computer formula, which measured a player's statistical contribution to his team. The player with the best contribution to his team in the league received the award. The first recipient was Magic Johnson of the Los Angeles Lakers, and the final recipient was Tim Duncan of the San Antonio Spurs.

With the exception of Magic Johnson and Michael Jordan, most of the players who won the award have been forwards or centers; many finished near the top in rebounding the year they won. The award was given out nineteen times, six times to players on the San Antonio Spurs, three times each to players on the Philadelphia 76ers and Los Angeles Lakers, and twice each to players on the Chicago Bulls and Detroit Pistons. David Robinson won five IBM Awards, Charles Barkley won three, and Michael Jordan and Shaquille O'Neal won two each.

As of Tim Duncan's selection to the Naismith Memorial Basketball Hall of Fame in 2020, all IBM Award winners have been inducted. Jordan, Robinson, Barkley, Johnson, Duncan, Shaquille O'Neal, Karl Malone, and Hakeem Olajuwon also won NBA Most Valuable Player awards during their career; Robinson, O'Neal and Duncan won both awards in the same season. Jordan, Robinson, Olajuwon, Dennis Rodman and Dikembe Mutombo have won the NBA Defensive Player of the Year Award; Olajuwon is the only player to win both in the same season. Grant Hill is the only winner of the IBM Award who did not win an NBA MVP or Defensive Player of the Year Award sometime in his career. O'Neal is the only player to win an IBM Award and an NBA title in the same season; he did this in both the 1999–00 and 2000–01 NBA seasons. Jordan and Robinson are the only players to win the IBM Award during their respective rookie seasons, both also won the NBA Rookie of the Year Award in those years. Two of the award winners were born outside the United States: Olajuwon (Nigeria) and Mutombo (Zaire). Duncan was born in the U.S. Virgin Islands. The award was discontinued in 2002. With Tim Duncan's retirement following the 2015–16 NBA season, there are no more IBM Award winners currently playing in the NBA.

The IBM Award was originally named the Pivotal Player Award and was sponsored by the Schick razor company.

== Winners ==
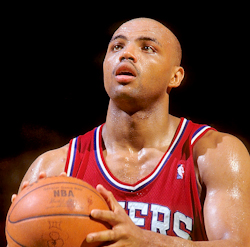
Philadelphia 76ers forward Charles Barkley won three consecutive IBM Awards.

*	Inducted into the Naismith Memorial Basketball Hall of Fame
Player (#)	Denotes the number of times the player won the IBM Award
Team (#)	Denotes the number of times a player from this team has won

List of IBM Award Winners
Season	Player	Position	Nationality	Team
1983–84	Magic Johnson*	Guard	United States	Los Angeles Lakers
1984–85	Michael Jordan*	Guard	United States	Chicago Bulls
1985–86	Charles Barkley*	Forward	United States	Philadelphia 76ers
1986–87	Charles Barkley* (2)	Forward	United States	Philadelphia 76ers (2)
1987–88	Charles Barkley* (3)	Forward	United States	Philadelphia 76ers (3)
1988–89	Michael Jordan* (2)	Guard	United States	Chicago Bulls (2)
1989–90	David Robinson*	Center	United States	San Antonio Spurs
1990–91	David Robinson* (2)	Center	United States	San Antonio Spurs (2)
1991–92	Dennis Rodman*	Forward	United States	Detroit Pistons
1992–93	Hakeem Olajuwon*^{b}	Center	Nigeria^{[c]}	Houston Rockets
1993–94	David Robinson* (3)	Center	United States	San Antonio Spurs (3)
1994–95	David Robinson* (4)^{a}	Center	United States	San Antonio Spurs (4)
1995–96	David Robinson* (5)	Center	United States	San Antonio Spurs (5)
1996–97	Grant Hill*	Forward	United States	Detroit Pistons (2)
1997–98	Karl Malone*	Forward	United States	Utah Jazz
1998–99	Dikembe Mutombo*	Center	Democratic Republic of the Congo^{[d]}	Atlanta Hawks
1999–00	Shaquille O'Neal* ^{a}	Center	United States	Los Angeles Lakers (2)
2000–01	Shaquille O'Neal* (2)	Center	United States	Los Angeles Lakers (3)
2001–02	Tim Duncan* ^{a} ^{e}	Forward-center	United States	San Antonio Spurs (6)

== Multi-time winners ==
Awards	Player	Team	Years
5	(United States) David Robinson	San Antonio Spurs	1989–90, 1990–91, 1993–94, 1994–95, 1995–96
3	(United States) Charles Barkley	Philadelphia 76ers	1985–86, 1986–87, 1987–88
2	(United States) Michael Jordan	Chicago Bulls	1984–85, 1988–89
2	(United States) Shaquille O'Neal	Los Angeles Lakers	1999–2000, 2000–01

== Teams ==
Awards	Teams	Years
6	San Antonio Spurs	1989–90, 1990–91, 1993–94, 1994–95, 1995–96, 2001–02
3	Los Angeles Lakers	1983–84, 1999–2000, 2000–01
3	Philadelphia 76ers	1985–86, 1986–87, 1987–88
2	Chicago Bulls	1984–85, 1988–89
2	Detroit Pistons	1991–92, 1996–97
1	Atlanta Hawks	1998–99
1	Houston Rockets	1992–93
1	Utah Jazz	1997–98
0	Boston Celtics	None
0	Brooklyn Nets	None
0	Charlotte Hornets	None
0	Cleveland Cavaliers	None
0	Dallas Mavericks	None
0	Denver Nuggets	None
0	Golden State Warriors	None
0	Indiana Pacers	None
0	Los Angeles Clippers	None
0	Memphis Grizzlies	None
0	Miami Heat	None
0	Milwaukee Bucks	None
0	Minnesota Timberwolves	None
0	New Orleans Pelicans	None
0	New York Knicks	None
0	Oklahoma City Thunder / Seattle SuperSonics	None
0	Orlando Magic	None
0	Phoenix Suns	None
0	Portland Trail Blazers	None
0	Sacramento Kings	None
0	Toronto Raptors	None
0	Washington Wizards / Washington Bullets	None

== Formula ==
The IBM Award was calculated with the following formula:

IBM Award formula

$$\frac{(\mathrm{plyr\ PTS}-\mathrm{plyr\ FGA}+\mathrm{plyr\ REB}+\mathrm{ plyr\  AST}+\mathrm{plyr\ STL}+\mathrm{plyr\ BLK}-\mathrm{plyr\ PF}-\mathrm{plyr\ TO}+(\mathrm{team\ wins}\times10))\times250}{\mathrm{team\ PTS}-\mathrm{team\ FGA}+\mathrm{team\ REB}+\mathrm{team\ AST}+\mathrm{team\ STL}+\mathrm{team\ BLK}-\mathrm{team\ PF}-\mathrm{team\ TO}}$$

In the formula, plyr stands for player, PTS stands for points, FGA stands for field goal attempts, REB stands for rebounds, AST stands for assists, STL stands for steals, BLK stands for blocks, PF stands for personal fouls, and TO stands for turnovers. The award was given to the player with the highest total.

The formula bears some resemblance to player efficiency rating, and many winners of the IBM award were calculated to have finished at or near the top in player efficiency rating in their award-winning seasons.

== Notes ==
- ^{a} Won the NBA Most Valuable Player Award in same season
- ^{b} Won the NBA Defensive Player of the Year Award in same season
- ^{c} Hakeem Olajuwon was born in Nigeria, but became a naturalized United States citizen in 1993.
- ^{d} Zaire was renamed the Democratic Republic of the Congo in May 1997.
- ^{e} Tim Duncan was born in the U.S. Virgin Islands, but is a U.S. citizen and has played for the U.S. Olympic Team. Despite this, the NBA considers him an international player.

== See also ==
- NBA records
