= List of NBA career rebounding leaders =

This article provides two lists:

A list of National Basketball Association players by total career regular season rebounds recorded. (Note: The National Basketball Association did not record rebounding statistics until the 1950–51 NBA season.)

A progressive list of rebound leaders showing how the record has increased through the years.

== Rebounding leaders ==
This is a list of National Basketball Association players by total career regular season rebounds recorded.

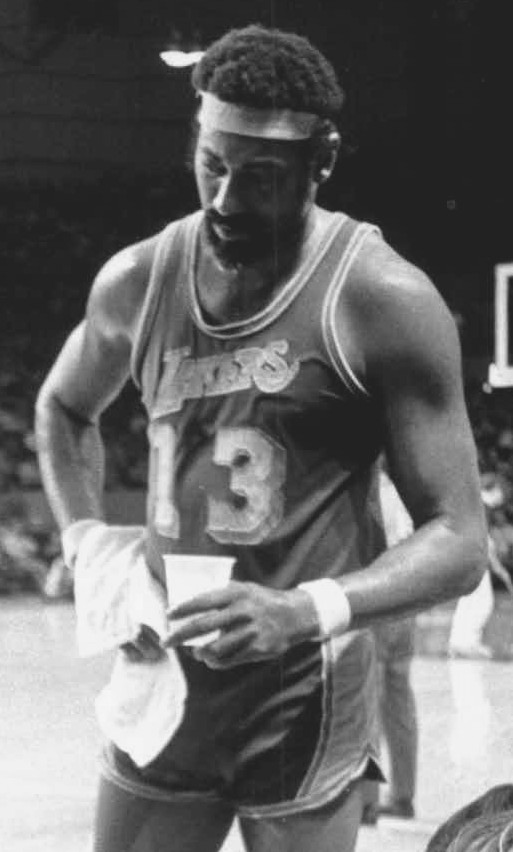
Wilt Chamberlain has the most rebounds in NBA history and the most rebounds in a single season.

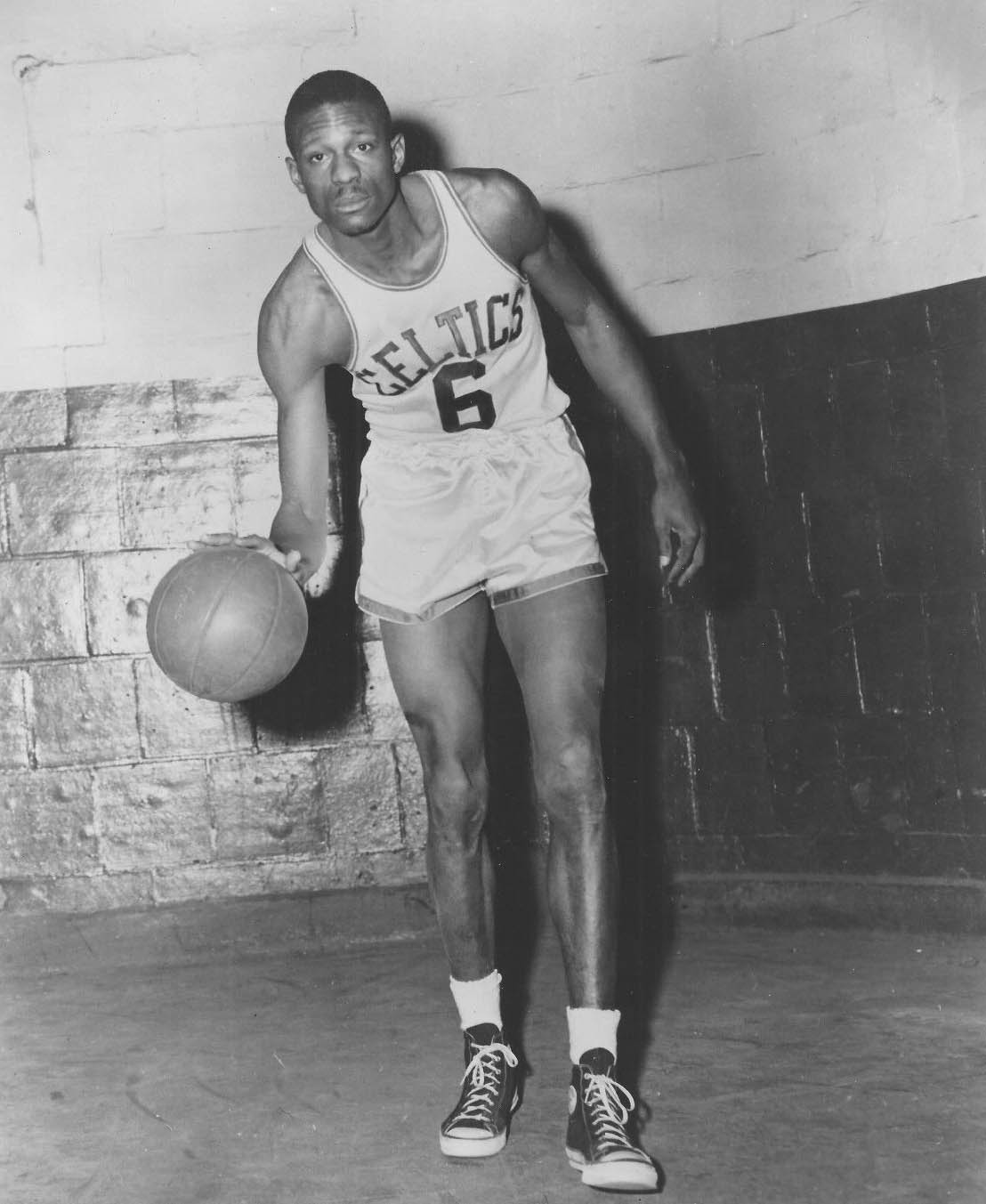
Bill Russell held the career rebounding record from 1963 to 1972.

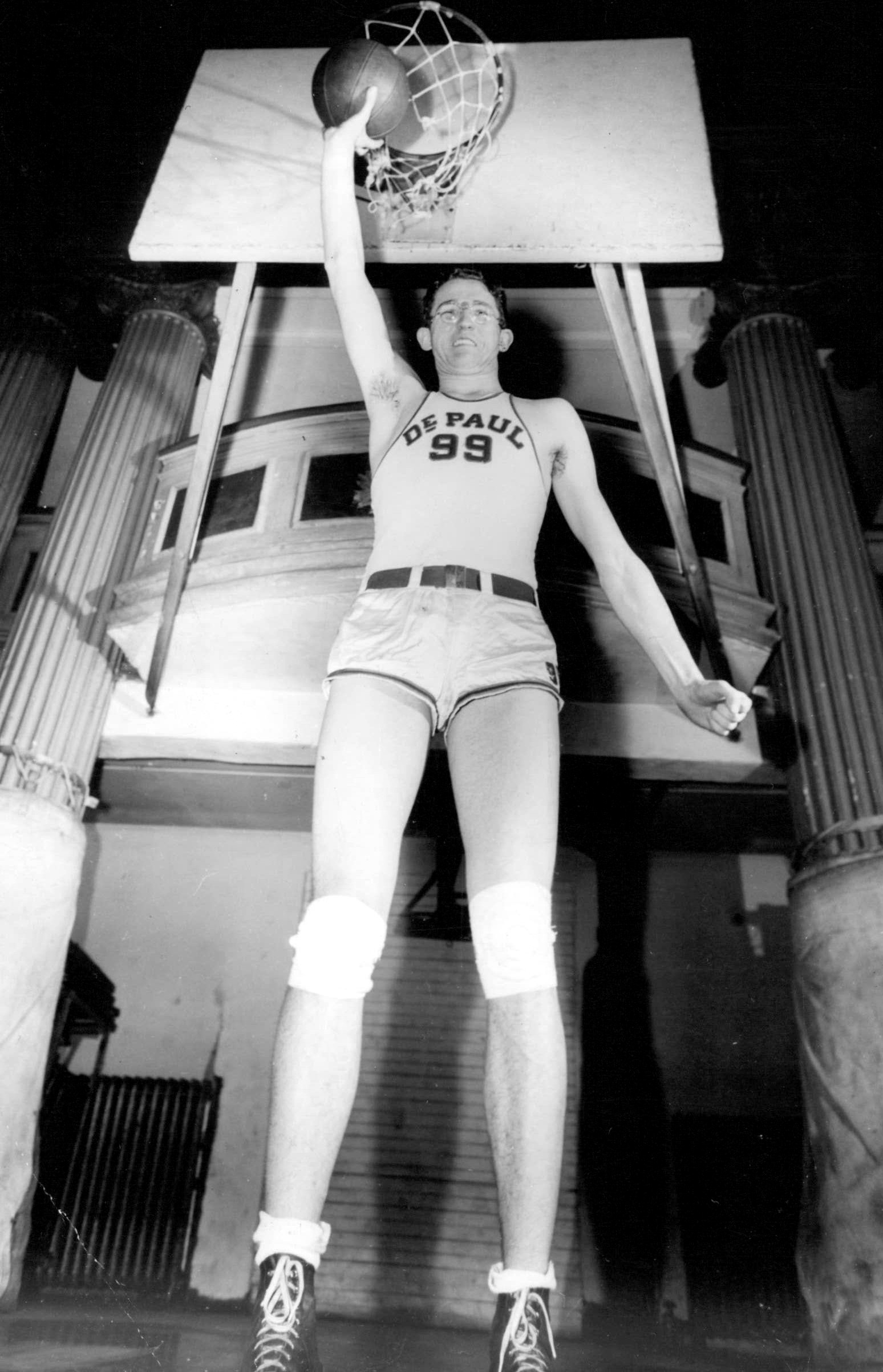
George Mikan held the record from 1952 to 1955.

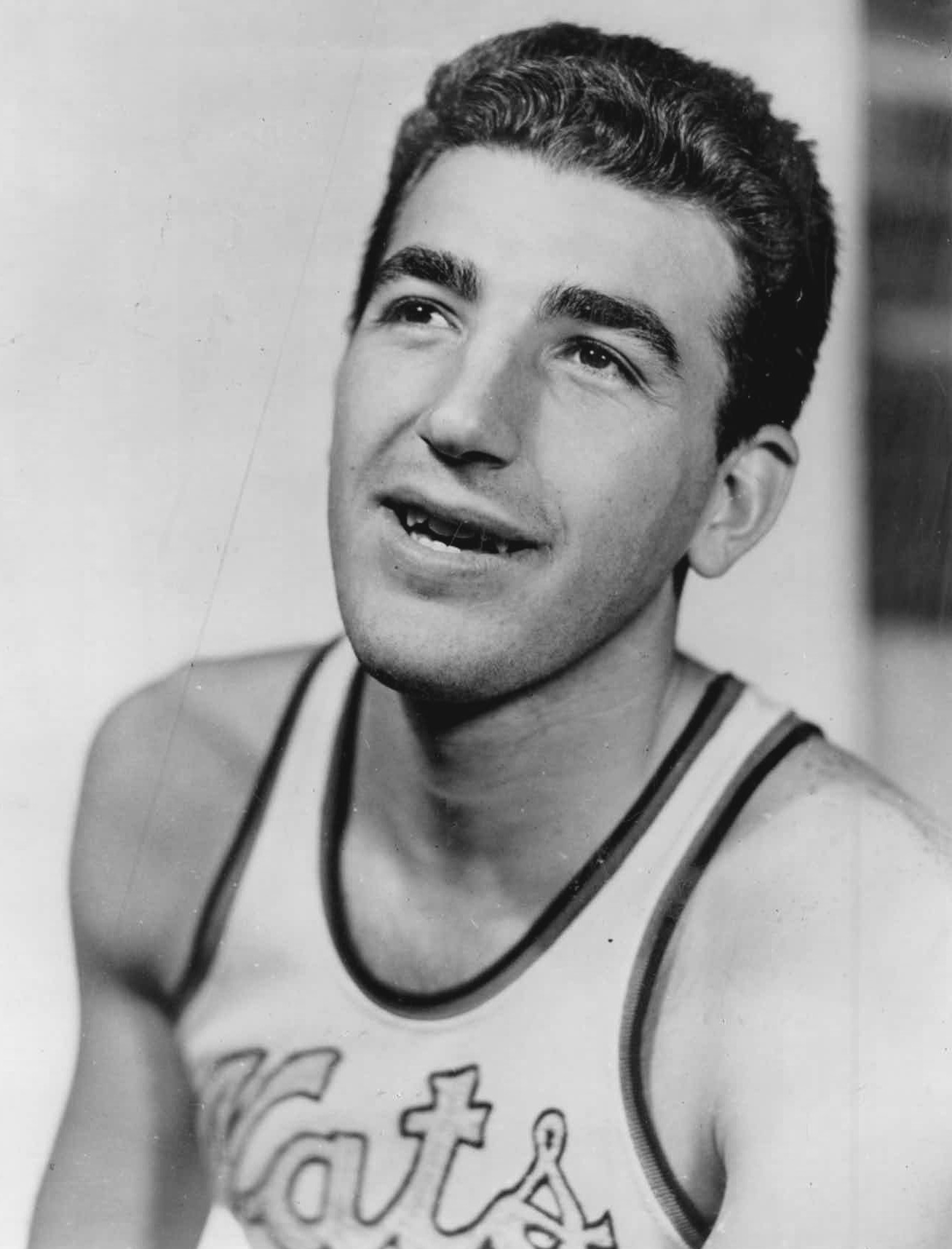
Dolph Schayes held the record from the league's inaugural season to 1952 and again from 1955 to 1963.

Statistics accurate as of November 18, 2026.

^	Active NBA player
*	Inducted into the Naismith Memorial Basketball Hall of Fame
†	Not yet eligible for Hall of Fame consideration (Note: A player is not eligible for induction into the Naismith Memorial Basketball Hall of Fame until he has been fully retired for two calendar years.)

Rank	Player	Pos	Team(s) played for (years) (Note: American Basketball Association (ABA) teams other than those admitted into the NBA in 1976 are not included; each year is linked to an article about that particular NBA season.)	Total rebounds	Games played	Rebounds per game average (Note: Average is rounded to the nearest tenth.)
1	Wilt Chamberlain*	C	Philadelphia/San Francisco Warriors (1959–1965); Philadelphia 76ers (1965–1968); Los Angeles Lakers (1968–1973)	23,924	1,045	22.9
2	Bill Russell*	C	Boston Celtics (1956–1969)	21,620	963	22.5
3	Kareem Abdul-Jabbar*	C	Milwaukee Bucks (1969–1975); Los Angeles Lakers (1975–1989)	17,440	1,560	11.2
4	Elvin Hayes*	PF/C	San Diego/Houston Rockets (1968–1972, 1981–1984); Baltimore/Capital/Washington Bullets (1972–1981)	16,279	1,303	12.5
5	Moses Malone*	C	Buffalo Braves (1976); Houston Rockets (1976–1982); Philadelphia 76ers (1982–1986, 1993–1994); Washington Bullets (1986–1988); Atlanta Hawks (1988–1991); Milwaukee Bucks (1991–1993); San Antonio Spurs (1994–1995)	16,212	1,329	12.2
6	Tim Duncan*	PF/C	San Antonio Spurs (1997–2016)	15,091	1,392	10.8
7	Karl Malone*	PF	Utah Jazz (1985–2003); Los Angeles Lakers (2003–2004)	14,968	1,476	10.1
8	Robert Parish*	C	Golden State Warriors (1976–1980); Boston Celtics (1980–1994); Charlotte Hornets (1994–1996); Chicago Bulls (1996–1997)	14,715	1,611	9.1
9	Kevin Garnett*	PF	Minnesota Timberwolves (1995–2007, 2015–2016); Boston Celtics (2007–2013); Brooklyn Nets (2013–2015)	14,662	1,462	10.0
10	Dwight Howard*	C	Orlando Magic (2004–2012); Los Angeles Lakers (2012–2013, 2019–2020, 2021–2022); Houston Rockets (2013–2016); Atlanta Hawks (2016–2017); Charlotte Hornets (2017–2018); Washington Wizards (2018–2019); Philadelphia 76ers (2020–2021)	14,627	1,242	11.8
11	Nate Thurmond*	C	San Francisco/Golden State Warriors (1963–1974); Chicago Bulls (1974–1976); Cleveland Cavaliers (1976–1977)	14,464	964	15.0
12	Walt Bellamy*	C	Chicago Packers/Zephyrs/Baltimore Bullets (1961–1965); New York Knicks (1965–1968); Detroit Pistons (1968–1970); Atlanta Hawks (1970–1974); New Orleans Jazz (1974)	14,241	1,043	13.7
13	Wes Unseld*	C	Baltimore/Capital/Washington Bullets (1968–1981)	13,769	984	14.0
14	Hakeem Olajuwon*	C	Houston Rockets (1984–2001); Toronto Raptors (2001–2002)	13,748	1,238	11.1
15	Shaquille O'Neal*	C	Orlando Magic (1992–1996); Los Angeles Lakers (1996–2004); Miami Heat (2004–2008); Phoenix Suns (2008–2009); Cleveland Cavaliers (2009–2010); Boston Celtics (2010–2011)	13,099	1,207	10.9
16	Buck Williams	PF	New Jersey Nets (1981–1989); Portland Trail Blazers (1989–1996); New York Knicks (1996–1998)	13,017	1,307	10.0
17	Jerry Lucas*	PF	Cincinnati Royals (1963–1969); San Francisco Warriors (1969–1971); New York Knicks (1971–1974)	12,942	829	15.6
18	Bob Pettit*	PF	Milwaukee/St. Louis Hawks (1954–1965)	12,849	792	16.2
19	Charles Barkley*	PF	Philadelphia 76ers (1984–1992); Phoenix Suns (1992–1996); Houston Rockets (1996–2000)	12,546	1,073	11.7
20	Dikembe Mutombo*	C	Denver Nuggets (1991–1996); Atlanta Hawks (1996–2001); Philadelphia 76ers (2001–2002); New Jersey Nets (2002–2003); New York Knicks (2003–2004); Houston Rockets (2004–2009)	12,359	1,196	10.3
21	Paul Silas	PF	St. Louis/Atlanta Hawks (1964–1969); Phoenix Suns (1969–1972); Boston Celtics (1972–1976); Denver Nuggets (1976–1977); Seattle SuperSonics (1977–1980)	12,357	1,254	9.9
22	Charles Oakley	PF	Chicago Bulls (1985–1988, 2001–2002); New York Knicks (1988–1998); Toronto Raptors (1998–2001); Washington Wizards (2002–2003); Houston Rockets (2004)	12,205	1,282	9.5
23	LeBron James^	SF	Cleveland Cavaliers (2003–2010, 2014–2018); Miami Heat (2010–2014); Los Angeles Lakers (2018–2026); Philadelphia 76ers (2026–present)	12,177	1,634	7.5
24	Dennis Rodman*	PF/SF	Detroit Pistons (1986–1993); San Antonio Spurs (1993–1995); Chicago Bulls (1995–1998); Los Angeles Lakers (1999); Dallas Mavericks (2000)	11,954	911	13.1
25	Kevin Willis	PF/C	Atlanta Hawks (1984–1994, 2004–2005); Miami Heat (1994–1996); Golden State Warriors (1996); Houston Rockets (1996–1998, 2001–2002); Toronto Raptors (1999–2001); Denver Nuggets (2001); San Antonio Spurs (2002–2004); Dallas Mavericks (2007)	11,901	1,424	8.4
26	Andre Drummond^	C	Detroit Pistons (2012–2020); Cleveland Cavaliers (2020–2021); Los Angeles Lakers (2021); Philadelphia 76ers (2021–2022, 2024–2026); Brooklyn Nets (2022); Chicago Bulls (2022–2024); New York Knicks (2026–present)	11,618	981	11.8
27	Patrick Ewing*	C	New York Knicks (1985–2000); Seattle SuperSonics (2000–2001); Orlando Magic (2001–2002)	11,607	1,183	9.8
28	Dirk Nowitzki*	PF	Dallas Mavericks (1998–2019)	11,489	1,522	7.6
29	Elgin Baylor*	SF	Minneapolis/Los Angeles Lakers (1958–1971)	11,463	846	13.5
30	Pau Gasol*	PF/C	Memphis Grizzlies (2001–2008); Los Angeles Lakers (2008–2014); Chicago Bulls (2014–2016); San Antonio Spurs (2016–2019); Milwaukee Bucks (2019)	11,305	1,226	9.2
31	Dolph Schayes*	PF	Syracuse Nationals (1949–1950) (Note: Rebounds were not yet recorded during the player's tenure with this team and season(s).); Syracuse Nationals/Philadelphia 76ers (1950–1964)	11,256	932	12.1
32	Bill Bridges	PF	St. Louis/Atlanta Hawks (1963–1971); Philadelphia 76ers (1971–1972); Los Angeles Lakers (1972–1974); Golden State Warriors (1975)	11,054	926	11.9
33	DeAndre Jordan^	C	Los Angeles Clippers (2008–2018); Dallas Mavericks (2018–2019); New York Knicks (2019); Brooklyn Nets (2019–2021); Los Angeles Lakers (2021–2022); Philadelphia 76ers (2022); Denver Nuggets (2022–2025); New Orleans Pelicans (2025–present)	10,887	1,128	9.7
34	Jack Sikma*	C	Seattle SuperSonics (1977–1986); Milwaukee Bucks (1986–1991)	10,816	1,107	9.8
35	Nikola Vučević^	C	Philadelphia 76ers (2011–2012); Orlando Magic (2012–2021, 2026–present); Chicago Bulls (2021–2026); Boston Celtics (2026)	10,741	1,048	10.2
36	Rudy Gobert^	C	Utah Jazz (2013–2022); Minnesota Timberwolves (2022–present)	10,728	919	11.7
37	David Robinson*	C	San Antonio Spurs (1989–2003)	10,497	987	10.6
38	Ben Wallace*	C/PF	Washington Bullets/Wizards (1996–1999); Orlando Magic (1999–2000); Detroit Pistons (2000–2006, 2009–2012); Chicago Bulls (2006–2008); Cleveland Cavaliers (2008–2009)	10,482	1,088	9.6
39	Tyson Chandler	C	Chicago Bulls (2001–2006); New Orleans Hornets (2006–2009); Charlotte Bobcats (2009–2010); Dallas Mavericks (2010–2011, 2014–2015); New York Knicks (2011–2014); Phoenix Suns (2015–2018); Los Angeles Lakers (2018–2019); Houston Rockets (2019–2020)	10,467	1,160	9.0
40	Dave Cowens*	C	Boston Celtics (1970–1980); Milwaukee Bucks (1982–1983)	10,444	766	13.6
41	Bill Laimbeer	C	Cleveland Cavaliers (1980–1982); Detroit Pistons (1982–1993)	10,400	1,068	9.7
42	Otis Thorpe	PF	Kansas City/Sacramento Kings (1984–1988, 1998); Houston Rockets (1988–1995); Portland Trail Blazers (1995); Detroit Pistons (1995–1997); Vancouver Grizzlies (1997–1998); Washington Wizards (1998–1999); Miami Heat (1999–2000); Charlotte Hornets (2000–2001)	10,370	1,257	8.3
43	Zach Randolph	PF	Portland Trail Blazers (2001–2007); New York Knicks (2007–2008); Los Angeles Clippers (2008–2009); Memphis Grizzlies (2009–2017); Sacramento Kings (2017–2019)	10,208	1,116	9.2
44	Shawn Marion	SF/PF	Phoenix Suns (1999–2008); Miami Heat (2008–2009); Toronto Raptors (2009); Dallas Mavericks (2009–2014); Cleveland Cavaliers (2014–2015)	10,101	1,163	8.7
45	Johnny Kerr	C	Syracuse Nationals/Philadelphia 76ers (1954–1965); Baltimore Bullets (1965–1966)	10,092	905	11.2
46	Kevin Love^{†}	PF	Minnesota Timberwolves (2008–2014); Cleveland Cavaliers (2014–2023); Miami Heat (2023–2025); Utah Jazz (2025–2026)	9,712	989	9.8
47	Bob Lanier*	C	Detroit Pistons (1970–1980); Milwaukee Bucks (1980–1984)	9,698	959	10.1
48	Sam Lacey	C	Cincinnati Royals/Kansas City(-Omaha) Kings (1970–1981); New Jersey Nets (1981–1982); Cleveland Cavaliers (1982–1983)	9,687	1,002	9.7
49	Dave DeBusschere*	PF/SF	Detroit Pistons (1962–1968); New York Knicks (1968–1974)	9,618	875	11.0
50	Marcus Camby	C	Toronto Raptors (1996–1998); New York Knicks (1998–2002, 2012–2013); Denver Nuggets (2002–2008); Los Angeles Clippers (2008–2010); Portland Trail Blazers (2010–2012); Houston Rockets (2012)	9,513	973	9.8

== Progressive list of rebounding leaders ==
This is a progressive list of rebounding leaders showing how the record increased through the years.

^	Active NBA player
*	Inducted into the Naismith Memorial Basketball Hall of Fame
†	Not yet eligible for Hall of Fame consideration (Note: A player is not eligible for induction into the Naismith Memorial Basketball Hall of Fame until he has been fully retired for two calendar years.)

Statistics accurate as of November 18, 2026.

Team abbreviationsTeam(s) listed is the one player was on when he established the record.
ATL	Atlanta Hawks	FTW	Fort Wayne Pistons	NOP	New Orleans Pelicans	SDR	San Diego Rockets
BKN	Brooklyn Nets	HOU	Houston Rockets	NYK	New York Knicks	SFW	San Francisco Warriors
BOS	Boston Celtics	IND	Indiana Pacers	ORL	Orlando Magic	STL	St. Louis Hawks
BUF	Buffalo Braves	LAC	Los Angeles Clippers	PHI	Philadelphia 76ers	SYR	Syracuse Nationals
CAP	Capital Bullets	LAL	Los Angeles Lakers	PHW	Philadelphia Warriors	SFW	San Francisco Warriors
CHA	Charlotte Hornets	MIL	Milwaukee Bucks	PHX	Phoenix Suns	UTA	Utah Jazz
CHI	Chicago Bulls	MIN	Minnesota Timberwolves	ROC	Rochester Royals	SYR	Syracuse Nationals
CLE	Cleveland Cavaliers	MLH	Milwaukee Hawks	SAC	Sacramento Kings	WAS	Washington Wizards
DEN	Denver Nuggets	MNL	Minneapolis Lakers	SAS	San Antonio Spurs	WSB	Washington Bullets
DET	Detroit Pistons	NOJ	New Orleans Jazz	SDC	San Diego Clippers		

Progressive leaders and records for total rebounds
Season	Year-by-year leader	REB	Active leader	REB	Career record	REB	Single-season record	REB	Season
1950–51	Dolph Schayes*SYR	1,080	Dolph Schayes*SYR	1,080	Dolph Schayes*SYR	1,080	Dolph Schayes*SYR	1,080	1950–51
1951–52	Mel HutchinsMLH; Larry FoustFTW	880	Dolph Schayes*SYR	1,853	Dolph Schayes*SYR	1,853	Dolph Schayes*SYR	1,080	1951–52
1952–53	George Mikan*MNL	1,007	George Mikan*MNL	2,831	George Mikan*MNL	2,831	Dolph Schayes*SYR	1,080	1952–53
1953–54	Harry Gallatin*NYK	1,098	George Mikan*MNL	3,859	George Mikan*MNL	3,859	Harry Gallatin*NYK	1,098	1953–54
1954–55	Neil Johnston*PHW	1,085	Dolph Schayes*SYR	4,530	Dolph Schayes*SYR	4,530	Harry Gallatin*NYK	1,098	1954–55
1955–56	Bob Pettit*STL	1,164	Dolph Schayes*SYR	5,421	Dolph Schayes*SYR	5,421	Bob Pettit*STL	1,164	1955–56
1956–57	Maurice Stokes*ROC	1,256	Dolph Schayes*SYR	6,429	Dolph Schayes*SYR	6,429	Maurice Stokes*ROC	1,256	1956–57
1957–58	Bill Russell*BOS	1,564	Dolph Schayes*SYR	7,451	Dolph Schayes*SYR	7,451	Bill Russell*BOS	1,564	1957–58
1958–59	Bill Russell*BOS	1,612	Dolph Schayes*SYR	8,413	Dolph Schayes*SYR	8,413	Bill Russell*BOS	1,612	1958–59
1959–60	Wilt Chamberlain*; PHW 1959–62; SFW 1962–63	1,941	Dolph Schayes*SYR	9,372	Dolph Schayes*SYR	9,372	Wilt Chamberlain*PHW	1,941	1959–60
1960–61	Wilt Chamberlain*; PHW 1959–62; SFW 1962–63	2,149	Dolph Schayes*SYR	10,332	Dolph Schayes*SYR	10,332	Wilt Chamberlain*PHW	2,149	1960–61
1961–62	Wilt Chamberlain*; PHW 1959–62; SFW 1962–63	2,052	Dolph Schayes*SYR	10,771	Dolph Schayes*SYR	10,771	Wilt Chamberlain*PHW	2,149	1961–62
1962–63	Wilt Chamberlain*; PHW 1959–62; SFW 1962–63	1,946	Bill Russell*BOS	11,398	Bill Russell*BOS	11,398	Wilt Chamberlain*PHW	2,149	1962–63
1963–64	Bill Russell*BOS	1,930	Bill Russell*BOS	13,328	Bill Russell*BOS	13,328	Wilt Chamberlain*PHW	2,149	1963–64
1964–65	Bill Russell*BOS	1,878	Bill Russell*BOS	15,206	Bill Russell*BOS	15,206	Wilt Chamberlain*PHW	2,149	1964–65
1965–66	Wilt Chamberlain*; PHI 1965–68; LAL 1968–69	1,943	Bill Russell*BOS	16,985	Bill Russell*BOS	16,985	Wilt Chamberlain*PHW	2,149	1965–66
1966–67	Wilt Chamberlain*; PHI 1965–68; LAL 1968–69	1,957	Bill Russell*BOS	18,685	Bill Russell*BOS	18,685	Wilt Chamberlain*PHW	2,149	1966–67
1967–68	Wilt Chamberlain*; PHI 1965–68; LAL 1968–69	1,952	Bill Russell*BOS	20,136	Bill Russell*BOS	20,136	Wilt Chamberlain*PHW	2,149	1967–68
1968–69	Wilt Chamberlain*; PHI 1965–68; LAL 1968–69	1,712	Bill Russell*BOS	21,620	Bill Russell*BOS	21,620	Wilt Chamberlain*PHW	2,149	1968–69
1969–70	Elvin Hayes*SDR	1,386	Wilt Chamberlain*LAL	19,333	Bill Russell*BOS	21,620	Wilt Chamberlain*PHW	2,149	1969–70
1970–71	Wilt Chamberlain*LAL	1,493	Wilt Chamberlain*LAL	20,826	Bill Russell*BOS	21,620	Wilt Chamberlain*PHW	2,149	1970–71
1971–72	Wilt Chamberlain*LAL	1,572	Wilt Chamberlain*LAL	22,398	Wilt Chamberlain*LAL	22,398	Wilt Chamberlain*PHW	2,149	1971–72
1972–73	Wilt Chamberlain*LAL	1,526	Wilt Chamberlain*LAL	23,924	Wilt Chamberlain*LAL	23,924	Wilt Chamberlain*PHW	2,149	1972–73
1973–74	Elvin Hayes*CAP	1,463	Walt Bellamy*; ATL 1973–74; NOJ 1974–75	14,236	Wilt Chamberlain*LAL	23,924	Wilt Chamberlain*PHW	2,149	1973–74
1974–75	Bob McAdoo*BUF	1,155	Walt Bellamy*; ATL 1973–74; NOJ 1974–75	14,241	Wilt Chamberlain*LAL	23,924	Wilt Chamberlain*PHW	2,149	1974–75
1975–76	Kareem Abdul-Jabbar*LAL	1,383	Nate Thurmond*; CHI 1975; CLE 1975–77	14,090	Wilt Chamberlain*LAL	23,924	Wilt Chamberlain*PHW	2,149	1975–77
1976–77	Kareem Abdul-Jabbar*LAL	1,090	Nate Thurmond*; CHI 1975; CLE 1975–77	14,464	Wilt Chamberlain*LAL	23,924	Wilt Chamberlain*PHW	2,149	1976–77
1977–78	Truck RobinsonNOJ	1,288	Elvin Hayes*; WSB 1977–81; HOU 1981–84	11,977	Wilt Chamberlain*LAL	23,924	Wilt Chamberlain*PHW	2,149	1977–78
1978–79	Moses Malone*HOU	1,444	Elvin Hayes*; WSB 1977–81; HOU 1981–84	12,971	Wilt Chamberlain*LAL	23,924	Wilt Chamberlain*PHW	2,149	1978–79
1979–80	Swen NaterSDC	1,216	Elvin Hayes*; WSB 1977–81; HOU 1981–84	13,867	Wilt Chamberlain*LAL	23,924	Wilt Chamberlain*PHW	2,149	1979–80
1980–81	Moses Malone*; HOU 1980–82; PHI 1982–83	1,180	Elvin Hayes*; WSB 1977–81; HOU 1981–84	14,656	Wilt Chamberlain*LAL	23,924	Wilt Chamberlain*PHW	2,149	1980–81
1981–82	Moses Malone*; HOU 1980–82; PHI 1982–83	1,188	Elvin Hayes*; WSB 1977–81; HOU 1981–84	15,403	Wilt Chamberlain*LAL	23,924	Wilt Chamberlain*PHW	2,149	1981–82
1982–83	Moses Malone*; HOU 1980–82; PHI 1982–83	1,194	Elvin Hayes*; WSB 1977–81; HOU 1981–84	16,019	Wilt Chamberlain*LAL	23,924	Wilt Chamberlain*PHW	2,149	1982–83
1983–84	Bill LaimbeerDET	1,003	Elvin Hayes*; WSB 1977–81; HOU 1981–84	16,279	Wilt Chamberlain*LAL	23,924	Wilt Chamberlain*PHW	2,149	1983–84
1984–85	Moses Malone*PHI	1,031	Kareem Abdul-Jabbar*LAL	15,627	Wilt Chamberlain*LAL	23,924	Wilt Chamberlain*PHW	2,149	1984–85
1985–86	Bill LaimbeerDET	1,075	Kareem Abdul-Jabbar*LAL	16,105	Wilt Chamberlain*LAL	23,924	Wilt Chamberlain*PHW	2,149	1985–86
1986–87	Charles OakleyCHI	1,074	Kareem Abdul-Jabbar*LAL	16,628	Wilt Chamberlain*LAL	23,924	Wilt Chamberlain*PHW	2,149	1986–87
1987–88	Charles OakleyCHI	1,066	Kareem Abdul-Jabbar*LAL	17,106	Wilt Chamberlain*LAL	23,924	Wilt Chamberlain*PHW	2,149	1987–88
1988–89	Hakeem Olajuwon*HOU	1,105	Kareem Abdul-Jabbar*LAL	17,440	Wilt Chamberlain*LAL	23,924	Wilt Chamberlain*PHW	2,149	1988–89
1989–90	Hakeem Olajuwon*HOU	1,149	Moses Malone*; ATL 1989–91; MIL 1991–93; PHI 1993–94; SAS 1994–95	14,483	Wilt Chamberlain*LAL	23,924	Wilt Chamberlain*PHW	2,149	1989–90
1990–91	David Robinson*SAS	1,063	Moses Malone*; ATL 1989–91; MIL 1991–93; PHI 1993–94; SAS 1994–95	15,150	Wilt Chamberlain*LAL	23,924	Wilt Chamberlain*PHW	2,149	1990–91
1991–92	Dennis Rodman*; DET 1991–93; SAS 1993–94	1,530	Moses Malone*; ATL 1989–91; MIL 1991–93; PHI 1993–94; SAS 1994–95	15,894	Wilt Chamberlain*LAL	23,924	Wilt Chamberlain*PHW	2,149	1991–92
1992–93	Dennis Rodman*; DET 1991–93; SAS 1993–94	1,132	Moses Malone*; ATL 1989–91; MIL 1991–93; PHI 1993–94; SAS 1994–95	15,940	Wilt Chamberlain*LAL	23,924	Wilt Chamberlain*PHW	2,149	1992–93
1993–94	Dennis Rodman*; DET 1991–93; SAS 1993–94	1,367	Moses Malone*; ATL 1989–91; MIL 1991–93; PHI 1993–94; SAS 1994–95	16,166	Wilt Chamberlain*LAL	23,924	Wilt Chamberlain*PHW	2,149	1993–94
1994–95	Dikembe Mutombo*DEN	1,029	Moses Malone*; ATL 1989–91; MIL 1991–93; PHI 1993–94; SAS 1994–95	16,212	Wilt Chamberlain*LAL	23,924	Wilt Chamberlain*PHW	2,149	1994–95
1995–96	David Robinson*SAS	1,000	Robert Parish*; CHA 1995–96; CHI 1996–97	14,626	Wilt Chamberlain*LAL	23,924	Wilt Chamberlain*PHW	2,149	1995–96
1996–97	Dikembe Mutombo*ATL	929	Robert Parish*; CHA 1995–96; CHI 1996–97	14,715	Wilt Chamberlain*LAL	23,924	Wilt Chamberlain*PHW	2,149	1996–97
1997–98	Dennis Rodman*CHI	1,201	Buck WilliamsNYK	13,017	Wilt Chamberlain*LAL	23,924	Wilt Chamberlain*PHW	2,149	1997–98
1998–99	Dikembe Mutombo*ATL	610	Hakeem Olajuwon*HOU	12,677	Wilt Chamberlain*LAL	23,924	Wilt Chamberlain*PHW	2,149	1998–99
1999–00	Dikembe Mutombo*ATL	1,157	Hakeem Olajuwon*HOU	12,951	Wilt Chamberlain*LAL	23,924	Wilt Chamberlain*PHW	2,149	1999–00
2000–01	Ben Wallace*DET	1,052	Hakeem Olajuwon*HOU	13,382	Wilt Chamberlain*LAL	23,924	Wilt Chamberlain*PHW	2,149	2000–01
2001–02	Tim Duncan*SAS	1,042	Karl Malone*; UTA 2001–03; LAL 2003–04	13,973	Wilt Chamberlain*LAL	23,924	Wilt Chamberlain*PHW	2,149	2001–02
2002–03	Ben Wallace*DET	1,126	Karl Malone*; UTA 2001–03; LAL 2003–04	14,601	Wilt Chamberlain*LAL	23,924	Wilt Chamberlain*PHW	2,149	2002–03
2003–04	Kevin Garnett*MIN	1,139	Karl Malone*; UTA 2001–03; LAL 2003–04	14,968	Wilt Chamberlain*LAL	23,924	Wilt Chamberlain*PHW	2,149	2003–04
2004–05	Kevin Garnett*MIN	1,108	Kevin WillisATL	11,893	Wilt Chamberlain*LAL	23,924	Wilt Chamberlain*PHW	2,149	2004–05
2005–06	Dwight Howard*ORL	1,022	Dikembe Mutombo*HOU	11,639	Wilt Chamberlain*LAL	23,924	Wilt Chamberlain*PHW	2,149	2005–06
2006–07	Dwight Howard*ORL	1,008	Dikembe Mutombo*HOU	12,127	Wilt Chamberlain*LAL	23,924	Wilt Chamberlain*PHW	2,149	2006–07
2007–08	Dwight Howard*ORL	1,161	Dikembe Mutombo*HOU	12,326	Wilt Chamberlain*LAL	23,924	Wilt Chamberlain*PHW	2,149	2007–08
2008–09	Dwight Howard*ORL	1,093	Shaquille O'Neal*; PHX 2008–09; CLE 2009–10; BOS 2010–11	12,566	Wilt Chamberlain*LAL	23,924	Wilt Chamberlain*PHW	2,149	2008–09
2009–10	Dwight Howard*ORL	1,082	Shaquille O'Neal*; PHX 2008–09; CLE 2009–10; BOS 2010–11	12,921	Wilt Chamberlain*LAL	23,924	Wilt Chamberlain*PHW	2,149	2009–10
2010–11	Kevin Love^{†}MIN	1,112	Shaquille O'Neal*; PHX 2008–09; CLE 2009–10; BOS 2010–11	13,099	Wilt Chamberlain*LAL	23,924	Wilt Chamberlain*PHW	2,149	2010–11
2011–12	Dwight Howard*ORL	785	Kevin Garnett*; BOS 2011–13; BKN 2013–14	13,313	Wilt Chamberlain*LAL	23,924	Wilt Chamberlain*PHW	2,149	2011–12
2012–13	Ömer AşıkHOU	956	Kevin Garnett*; BOS 2011–13; BKN 2013–14	13,843	Wilt Chamberlain*LAL	23,924	Wilt Chamberlain*PHW	2,149	2012–13
2013–14	DeAndre Jordan^LAC	1,114	Kevin Garnett*; BOS 2011–13; BKN 2013–14	14,201	Wilt Chamberlain*LAL	23,924	Wilt Chamberlain*PHW	2,149	2013–14
2014–15	DeAndre Jordan^LAC	1,226	Tim Duncan*SAS	14,644	Wilt Chamberlain*LAL	23,924	Wilt Chamberlain*PHW	2,149	2014–15
2015–16	Andre Drummond^DET	1,198	Tim Duncan*SAS	15,091	Wilt Chamberlain*LAL	23,924	Wilt Chamberlain*PHW	2,149	2015–16
2016–17	Andre Drummond^DET	1,115	Dwight Howard*; ATL 2016–17; CHA 2017–18; WAS 2018–19; LAL 2019–20; PHI 2020–21; LAL 2021–22	12,089	Wilt Chamberlain*LAL	23,924	Wilt Chamberlain*PHW	2,149	2016–17
2017–18	Andre Drummond^DET	1,247	Dwight Howard*; ATL 2016–17; CHA 2017–18; WAS 2018–19; LAL 2019–20; PHI 2020–21; LAL 2021–22	13,101	Wilt Chamberlain*LAL	23,924	Wilt Chamberlain*PHW	2,149	2017–18
2018–19	Andre Drummond^DET	1,232	Dwight Howard*; ATL 2016–17; CHA 2017–18; WAS 2018–19; LAL 2019–20; PHI 2020–21; LAL 2021–22	13,184	Wilt Chamberlain*LAL	23,924	Wilt Chamberlain*PHW	2,149	2018–19
2019–20	Rudy Gobert^UTA	916	Dwight Howard*; ATL 2016–17; CHA 2017–18; WAS 2018–19; LAL 2019–20; PHI 2020–21; LAL 2021–22	13,691	Wilt Chamberlain*LAL	23,924	Wilt Chamberlain*PHW	2,149	2019–20
2020–21	Rudy Gobert^UTA	960	Dwight Howard*; ATL 2016–17; CHA 2017–18; WAS 2018–19; LAL 2019–20; PHI 2020–21; LAL 2021–22	14,271	Wilt Chamberlain*LAL	23,924	Wilt Chamberlain*PHW	2,149	2020–21
2021–22	Nikola Jokić^DEN	1,019	Dwight Howard*; ATL 2016–17; CHA 2017–18; WAS 2018–19; LAL 2019–20; PHI 2020–21; LAL 2021–22	14,627	Wilt Chamberlain*LAL	23,924	Wilt Chamberlain*PHW	2,149	2021–22
2022–23	Domantas Sabonis^SAC	973	LeBron James^ LAL 2022–26; PHI 2026–	10,667	Wilt Chamberlain*LAL	23,924	Wilt Chamberlain*PHW	2,149	2022–23
2023–24	Domantas Sabonis^SAC	1,120	LeBron James^ LAL 2022–26; PHI 2026–	11,185	Wilt Chamberlain*LAL	23,924	Wilt Chamberlain*PHW	2,149	2023–24
2024–25	Ivica Zubac^LAC	1,010	LeBron James^ LAL 2022–26; PHI 2026–	11,731	Wilt Chamberlain*LAL	23,924	Wilt Chamberlain*PHW	2,149	2024–25
2025–26	Donovan Clingan^POR	892	LeBron James^ LAL 2022–26; PHI 2026–	12,095	Wilt Chamberlain*LAL	23,924	Wilt Chamberlain*PHW	2,149	2025–26
2026–27	Karl-Anthony Towns^NYK	197	LeBron James^ LAL 2022–26; PHI 2026–	12,177	Wilt Chamberlain*LAL	23,924	Wilt Chamberlain*PHW	2,149	2026–27
Season	Year-by-year leader	REB	Active player leader	REB	Career record	REB	Single-season record	REB	Season

== See also ==
- Basketball statistics
- NBA records
