= Israel Idonije =

American football player (born 1980)

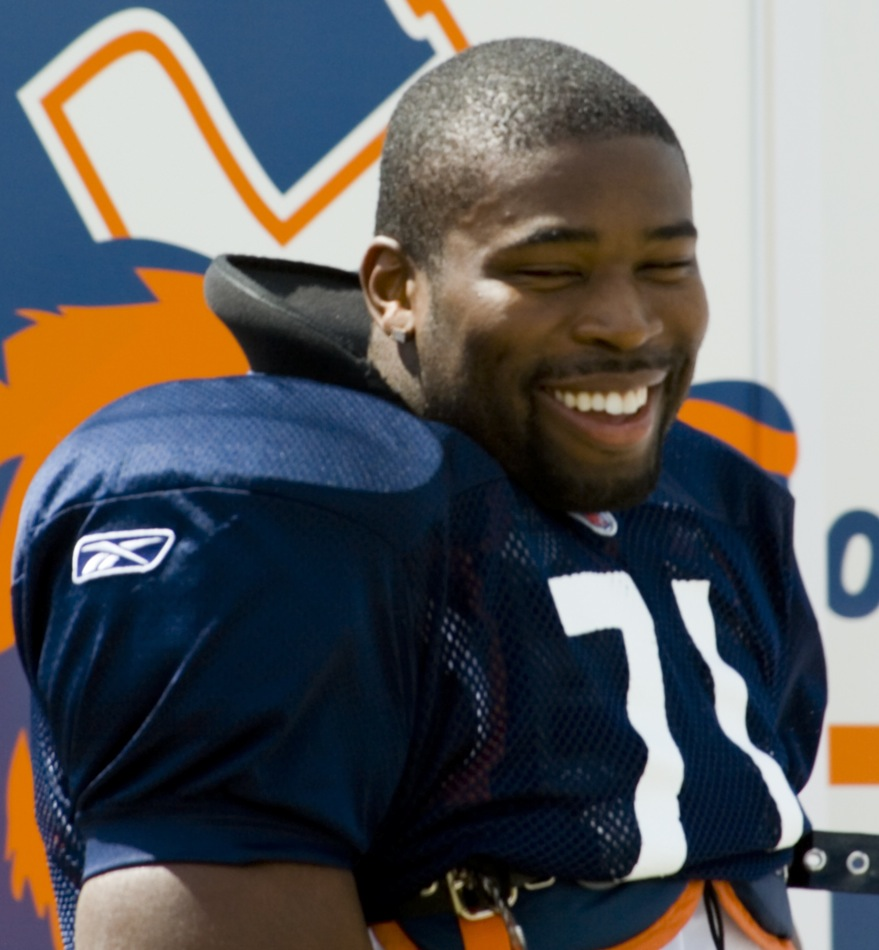
- Idonije in 2008

No. 71, 77
- Position: Defensive end

Personal information
- Born: November 17, 1980 (age 46); Lagos, Nigeria
- Listed height: 6 ft 6 in (1.98 m)
- Listed weight: 275 lb (125 kg)

Career information
- High school: Vincent Massey (Brandon, Manitoba, Canada)
- University: Manitoba
- CFL draft: 2003: 2nd round, 17th overall pick

Career history
- Cleveland Browns (2003); Chicago Bears (2003–2012); Detroit Lions (2013); Chicago Bears (2014)*; New York Giants (2014)*
- * Offseason or practice squad member only

Awards and highlights
- J. P. Metras Trophy (2002)

Career CFL statistics
- Total tackles: 288
- Sacks: 29.0
- Forced fumbles: 8
- Fumble recoveries: 6
- Defensive touchdowns: 1
- Stats at Pro Football Reference

Israel Idonije OM (born November 17, 1980) is a Nigerian-Canadian former professional football defensive end in the National Football League (NFL) and actor. Idonije played CIS football at the University of Manitoba. A draft pick of the now defunct Ottawa Renegades of the Canadian Football League (CFL), for whom he never played a game, Idonije signed with the Cleveland Browns of the NFL as an undrafted free agent in 2003.

He was also a member of the Chicago Bears, Detroit Lions and New York Giants.

== Early life ==
Idonije was born in Lagos, Nigeria and immigrated with his family to Brandon, Manitoba, Canada, when he was four years old. He attended Vincent Massey High School in Brandon and, though he had never played football and was reluctant, coach Kevin Grindey convinced him to play when the school restarted its Canadian football program in 1997, when Idonije was a senior in high school.

== University career ==
Idonije went on to play CIS football for the Manitoba Bisons. During this time he worked as a daycare teacher in Winnipeg, Manitoba, played in the East-West Shrine Game, and was drafted 17th overall by the Ottawa Renegades in the 2003 CFL draft. At Manitoba from 2000 to 2002, Idonije recorded 16 sacks which stands fourth all-time in Bison history. He helped lead the Bison to the 2001 Vanier Cup where Manitoba was defeated by the Saint Mary's Huskies. In 2002, Idonije was named 2002 Manitoba Male Athlete of the Year. His goal, however, was to play in the National Football League.

== Professional career ==
=== Pre-draft ===
Idonije was not invited to the NFL Combine, but appeared on his own to distribute tapes of his years at University of Manitoba. Nine NFL team scouts were originally scheduled to attend a subsequent workout in Manitoba, but only one team, (the Cleveland Browns) ended up attending due to the 2002–2004 SARS outbreak.

=== Cleveland Browns ===
Idonije was signed by the Browns as an undrafted free agent on May 2, 2003. He was placed on injured reserve on August 26 and was waived by the Browns on September 30, 2003.

=== Chicago Bears (first stint) ===
Idonije was subsequently signed to the Chicago Bears' practice squad for the final six weeks of the season.

He made the final roster the following year. Idonije also played gunner on the punt coverage team.

In 2006, Idonije became a restricted free agent and the Buffalo Bills attempted to sign him, but the Bears retained him by matching their offer. During the 2007 NFL season, Idonije had three consecutive games with a blocked field goal or extra point. In 2008, Idonije set career highs in sacks (3.5), tackles (22), and passes defenced (6). In May 2009, signed a two-year, $7 million contract extension with the Bears. On December 30, 2009, Idonije was placed on injured reserve due to a foot injury.

In 2010, week 5 at the Carolina Panthers, Idonije recorded 3 sacks.

In 2011, in week 15 against the Seattle Seahawks, Idonije scored his first NFL touchdown after a fumble recovery in the end zone after Tarvaris Jackson had the ball stripped by Julius Peppers.

With the drafting of Shea McClellin in 2012, Idonije was moved to defensive tackle. In the second game of the preseason against the Washington Redskins, Idonije recorded 2½ sacks on rookie and Heisman Trophy winner Robert Griffin III. Idonije would once again record 2½ sacks in week three against the St. Louis Rams. Idonije ended the season with 40 tackles, 7.5 sacks, and a forced fumble, and he was later named to the USA Today All-Joe Team.

=== Detroit Lions ===
On June 25, 2013, Idonije signed a one-year contract with the Detroit Lions. Idonije recorded 11 tackles and half a sack during the 2013 season.

=== Chicago Bears (second stint) ===
On March 18, 2014, Idonije signed a one-year deal to return to the Bears. The Bears released him on June 19, 2014.

=== New York Giants ===
Idonije signed with the New York Giants on August 5, 2014. He was released on August 30, 2014.

== NFL career statistics ==
Legend
**Bold**	Career high

=== Regular season ===
Year	Team	Games		Tackles					Interceptions					Fumbles			
Year	Team	GP	GS	Cmb	Solo	Ast	Sck	TFL	Int	Yds	TD	Lng	PD	FF	FR	Yds	TD
2004	CHI	15	0	21	15	6	1.0	4	0	0	0	0	1	0	0	0	0
2005	CHI	11	1	20	16	4	1.0	2	0	0	0	0	1	0	1	0	0
2006	CHI	13	1	19	13	6	0.0	2	0	0	0	0	1	0	**2**	0	0
2007	CHI	**16**	3	27	19	8	0.0	2	0	0	0	0	3	1	1	0	0
2008	CHI	**16**	3	24	22	2	3.5	5	0	0	0	0	**6**	0	0	0	0
2009	CHI	15	0	18	13	5	2.5	2	0	0	0	0	0	1	0	0	0
2010	CHI	**16**	15	48	32	16	**8.0**	10	0	0	0	0	3	**4**	0	0	0
2011	CHI	**16**	**16**	**52**	**41**	11	5.0	**12**	0	0	0	0	0	1	**2**	0	**1**
2012	CHI	**16**	11	48	29	**19**	7.5	8	0	0	0	0	0	1	0	0	0
2013	DET	15	0	11	7	4	0.5	5	0	0	0	0	0	0	0	0	0
		149	50	288	207	81	29.0	52	0	0	0	0	15	8	6	0	1

=== Playoffs ===
Year	Team	Games		Tackles					Interceptions					Fumbles			
Year	Team	GP	GS	Cmb	Solo	Ast	Sck	TFL	Int	Yds	TD	Lng	PD	FF	FR	Yds	TD
2005	CHI	1	0	1	1	0	0.0	0	0	0	0	0	0	0	0	0	0
2006	CHI	**3**	0	2	**2**	0	**1.0**	**1**	0	0	0	0	0	0	0	0	0
2010	CHI	2	**2**	**4**	1	**3**	0.5	**1**	0	0	0	0	0	0	0	0	0
		6	2	7	4	3	1.5	2	0	0	0	0	0	0	0	0	0

== Outside football ==
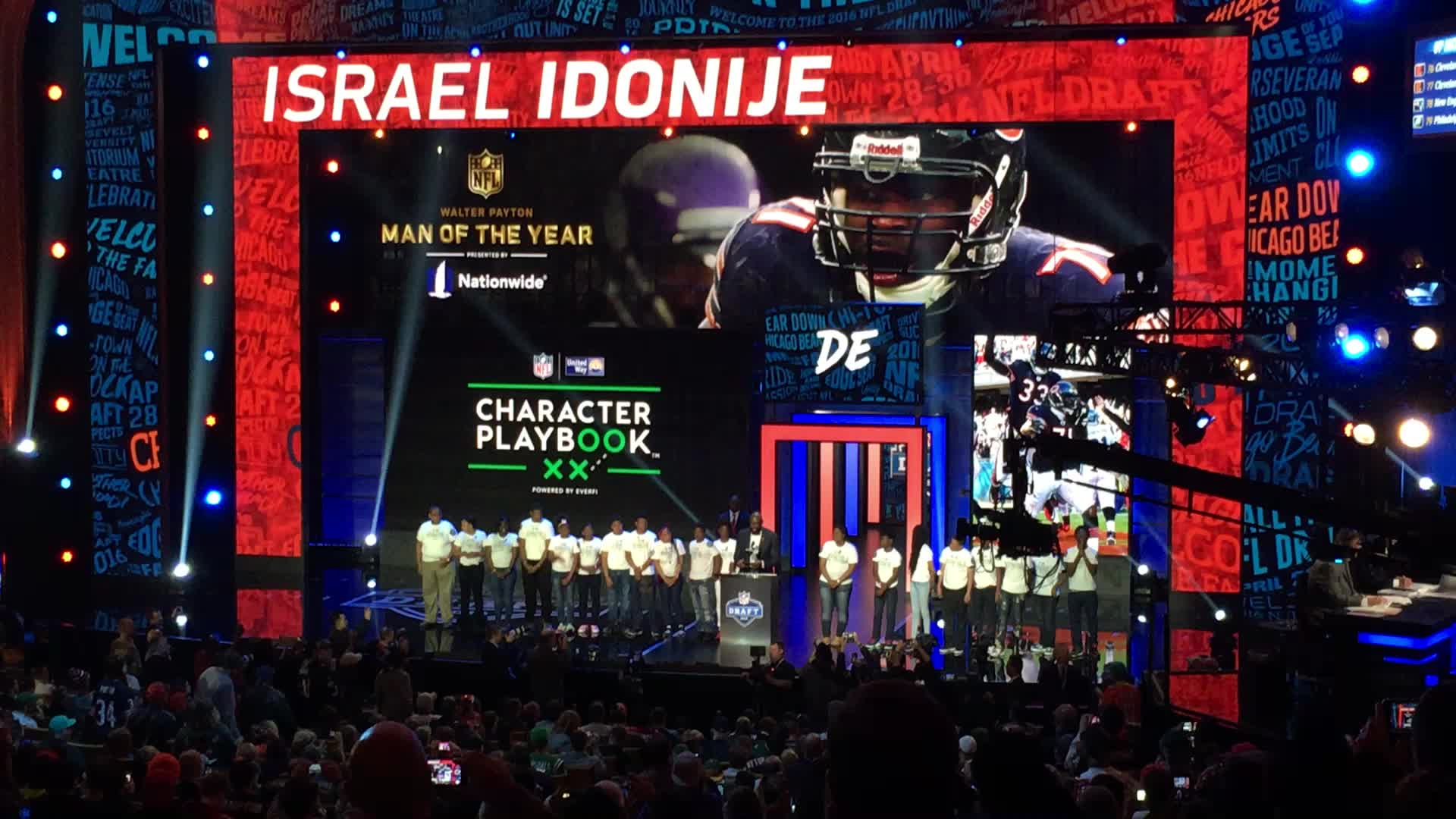
Idonije announcing a pick at the 2016 NFL draft

=== Athlitacomics ===
Idonije revealed his new comic, The Protectors, at its soft launch during the New York Comic Con in October 2012. He came up with the idea at the Chicago Bears training camp in 2007. The Protectors, set in the future, is based around a group of super athletes who learn they are blessed with super powers that help protect humanity. Idonije brought on writer Ron Marz and artist Bart Sears to complete the project. Idonije will be publishing the comic through the publishing company he founded, Athleta Comics. Athleta Comics is part of Athleta Entertainment.

The Protectors issue #0 made its debut at C2E2 in Chicago, April 26–28, 2013. Issue #1 is scheduled to come out in September 2013.

Idonije also created Sports Heroes' showcasing athletes through comic artistry, and Athlitacomics became an NFLPA licensee. Sports Heroes can be found on the first of its kind consumable NFLPI licensed product.

Idonije launched his DreamKidz Love book series to promote social and emotional awareness for children. His first book "I Love Me (Izzy Cover) was released on Amazon on January 24, 2017.

Prior to the 2018 NFL season, Idonije and Athlitacomics formed a partnership with the Bears to create a "Monsters of the Midway" comic universe to promote the Bears' 2018 schedule.

=== Ask The Doctor ===
Idonije along with serial entrepreneur, Prakash Chand founded medical question and answer service Ask The Doctor, a portal allowing anyone, anywhere immediate access to a doctor.

Idonije and Ask The Doctor recently announced a scholarship fund for students entering 1st year of an accredited American or Canadian college or university, or exceptional high school graduates or high school drop outs looking to start a digital health company.

=== iF Charities ===
Idonije established iF Charities, formerly known as the Israel Idonije Foundation in 2007. It is a registered 501(c)3 non-profit organization. It serves communities in Chicago, Winnipeg and West Africa - all the places Idonije has called home. iF Charities offers several core programs, projects, and events.

=== Blessed Communion ===
Idonije started Blessed Communion in 2009. Blessed Communion manufactures dual-chambered, pre-filled Communion cups for individuals, churches and other religious organizations.

=== The Bureau Chicago ===
Idonije opened up an office, meeting and business event space in the South Loop.

=== Order of Manitoba ===
Manitoba Lieutenant-Governor Philip S. Lee announced on May 12, 2014, that Idonije is to be inducted into the Order of Manitoba. The ceremony took place at the Manitoba Legislature in Winnipeg on May 21, 2014.

=== Chicago Red Stars ===
On March 1, 2021, the Chicago Red Stars of the National Women's Soccer League announced that Idonije had joined the women's soccer team's ownership group.
