= Ask the Doctor (website) =

Medical question and answer website

ask the doctor
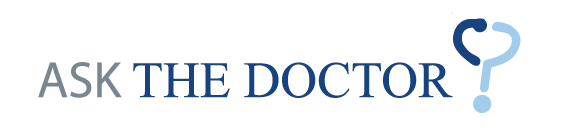
- Type: Private
- Industry: healthcare
- Founded: 2014
- Founders: Prakash Chand, Dr. Patrick A. Golden, Israel Idonije & Dikembe Mutombo
- Headquarters: Toronto, Canada
- Website: https://www.askthedoctor.com

Ask The Doctor is a medical information website that was founded in Toronto, Canada.

The platform was co-founded by Dr. Patrick A. Golden, Dikembe Mutombo, Israel Idonije, and Prakash Chand.

== History ==
Ask The Doctor was founded in 2014 as an online platform.

During an interview in 2011 with Omni News, the company founder stated that the majority of its patients were from the United States, Canada, United Kingdom and India. He also stated that the website had been used in over 100 different countries up to that point in the company's history.

In 2012, it was announced that Ask The Doctor would be partnering with the National Institutes of Health. As part of the partnership, Ask The Doctor's database of questions could be integrated with an artificial intelligence database in order to act like a doctor's assistant. Researchers at the National Institutes of Health announced that they were piloting a scheme using over 200,000 questions and answers from Ask The Doctor. The National Institutes of Health also contacted IBM regarding using the Watson computer to test the questions. Stanford University also announced they would be assisting with the research project.

Ask The Doctor received recognition in the medical sector following the May 2015 Nepal earthquake. It gave the people of Nepal the opportunity to have free advice for a 2-month period following the earthquake. It was stated that shortly after the earthquake that over 3,000 people from Nepal had used the service.

In early October 2015, the company announced that it would be acquiring the largest Indian medical resource, Sehat. The Sehat platform was to be integrated into the Ask The Doctor group as a subsidiary of HealthBrands and to operate solely in India. Sehat would also be collaborating with the Indian Government's initiative called Digital India initiative, which aims to digitalize various areas of information for the Indian people.

A month later the company also acquired the British patient platform, Patients Connected. Ask The Doctor then announced they planned to utilize the London-based offices, while also opening new offices in Wales, Scotland and Ireland during the coming year.

== Service ==
Ask The Doctor is a resource that aims to provide the reader with the answer to any health-related question the user might have. The service is provided at a small charge to the client. There are other services on the market such as WebMD that differ from Ask The Doctor, as they produce general medical content, rather than connecting the patient directly with a doctor for real-time advice. After expanding to India and receiving regular patients from the region, the Mumbai Mirror reviewed the service provided by Ask The Doctor. The review gave the website 5/5 for its functionality and use.

In a 2011 interview, the company founder stated the majority of the patients that were using the website, were people with limited access to quality healthcare. He stated that this could range from teenage girls talking about pregnancy, to people who were unable to see specialists due to the costs involved.

In 2016, Ask The Doctor became the world's first health care platform to accept bitcoin from users. In an interview with the Huffington Post, the company founders said that the reason for accepting bitcoin was the extra layer of anonymity it provides users who are sharing very sensitive medical information.
