= Michael J. Klag =

American internist and epidemiologist

- Born: 1952 (age 73–74); Pennsylvania, USA
- Spouses: Lucy A. Meoni; Wendy Jane Schagen Klag (m. 1975; died 2006)
- Children: 3

Academic background
- Education: BSc, 1974, Juniata College; MD, 1978, Perelman School of Medicine at the University of Pennsylvania; MPH, 1987, Johns Hopkins Bloomberg School of Public Health

Academic work
- Institutions: Johns Hopkins School of Medicine; Johns Hopkins Bloomberg School of Public Health

Michael John Klag (born 1952) is an American internist and epidemiologist. For eight years, he was the Director of the Division of General Internal Medicine and was the first Vice Dean for Clinical Investigation at the Johns Hopkins School of Medicine.

Throughout his tenure at Johns Hopkins, Klag focused on the risk factors for, prevalence of and effective intervention strategies for kidney disease. He was among the first to raise the alarm of kidney disease epidemic across the United States and associate the risk of developing kidney disease with blood pressure, diabetes, race, socioeconomic status and other factors.

== Early life and education ==
Klag was born in 1952 to parents Rudolph E. Klag and Cecelia Ann McGinley in Pennsylvania. When his father died, his mother remarried to John E. McGuire. He graduated from Kennedy-Kenrick Catholic High School in 1970 and enrolled at Juniata College for his undergraduate degree. Following this, he enrolled at the Perelman School of Medicine at the University of Pennsylvania for his medical degree and completed his medical internship, residency, and chief residency in internal medicine at State University of New York Upstate Medical University. In 1984, he began a fellowship in internal medicine at Johns Hopkins School of Medicine (JHUSOM) and then enrolled at their school of public health for his Master's degree in Public Health.

== Career ==
Upon completing his medical education, Klag accepted a joint appointment in Epidemiology and Health Policy and Management in JHUSOM from 1987 to 1988. From there, he was named director of The Precursors Study which concluded in 2011. Throughout his tenure at Johns Hopkins, Klag focused on the risk factors for, prevalence of and effective intervention strategies for kidney disease. He was among the first to raise the alarm of kidney disease epidemic across the United States and associate the risk of developing kidney disease with blood pressure, diabetes, race, socioeconomic status and other factors.

In 1998, Klag was promoted to Full professor in the JHUSOM and was appointed interim director of the department of medicine and interim physician-in-chief at The Johns Hopkins Hospital from 2000 to 2001. While serving in these roles, he directed a study that indicated that many doctors avoid seeing their own physicians and taking care of their own health. He came to this conclusion by surveying 312 out of 915 JHUSOM graduates. Later that year, he oversaw another study that analyzed 14 tests of coffee-drinking adults conducted between 1985 and 1992 to come to the conclusion that coffee filters played an important role in controlling cholesterol. As a result of his research, Klag succeeded Alfred Sommer as Dean of Johns Hopkins Bloomberg School of Public Health with simultaneous appointments as professor in the Bloomberg School's Department of Epidemiology and Department of Health Policy and Management.

Klag served as Dean of Johns Hopkins Bloomberg School of Public Health for 11 years, becoming the school's longest-tenured divisional dean or director. During his time as dean, Klag was appointed to by the United States Department of Health and Human Services to serve as a member of the Health Information Technology Policy Committee. He was also recognized by the American College of Physicians with their James D. Bruce Memorial Award for Distinguished Contributions in Preventive Medicine, and by the Kidney Foundation of Maryland. After serving as Dean for 11 years, Klag stepped down from his role in 2016 to return to research and teaching. Upon stepping down, he was expected to take a one-year sabbatical before joining the school's departments of Epidemiology and Health Policy and Management. In 2019, Klag was appointed to Juniata College's board of trustees for that academic year and then joined Doctor Evidence LLC's Medical Strategy Advisory Board of Directors. On April 17, 2019, Klag was installed as the inaugural holder of the Second Century Distinguished Professorship, which would become the Michael J. Klag and Lucy A. Meoni Distinguished Professorship upon his retirement. The donors wished to recognize Meoni's contributions as "Klag's crucial partner in the School’s success" and her own faculty legacy.

== Personal life ==
Klag married Wendy Jane Schagen Klag in 1975. Following her death in 2006, he established the Wendy Klag Center for Autism and Developmental Disabilities in her honor. He later remarried to Lucy A. Meoni, a JHU biostatistics faculty member.
