= Stephen Curry =

American basketball player (born 1988)

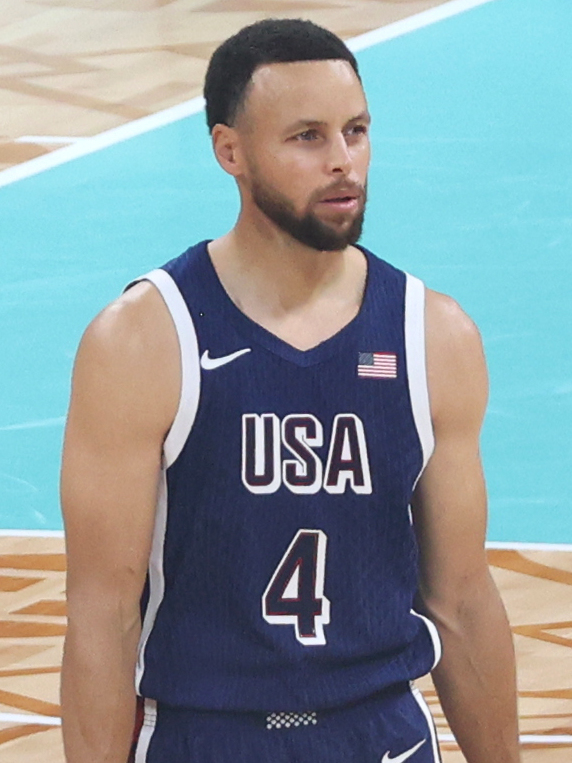
- Curry with the 2024 U.S. Olympic team

No. 30 – Golden State Warriors
- Position: Point guard
- League: NBA

Personal information
- Born: March 14, 1988 (age 38) Akron, Ohio, U.S.
- Listed height: 6 ft 2 in (1.88 m)
- Listed weight: 205 lb (93 kg)

Career information
- High school: Charlotte Christian (Charlotte, North Carolina)
- College: Davidson (2006–2009)
- NBA draft: 2009: 1st round, 7th overall pick
- Drafted by: Golden State Warriors
- Playing career: 2009–present

Career history
- 2009–present: Golden State Warriors

Career highlights
- 4× NBA champion (2015, 2017, 2018, 2022); NBA Finals MVP (2022); 2× NBA Most Valuable Player (2015, 2016); 12× NBA All-Star (2014–2019, 2021–2026); 2× NBA All-Star Game MVP (2022, 2025); 4× All-NBA First Team (2015, 2016, 2019, 2021); 5× All-NBA Second Team (2014, 2017, 2022, 2023, 2025); 2× All-NBA Third Team (2018, 2024); NBA Western Conference finals MVP (2022); 2× NBA Three-Point Contest champion (2015, 2021); 2× NBA scoring champion (2016, 2021); NBA steals leader (2016); NBA All-Rookie First Team (2010); NBA 75th Anniversary Team; AP Athlete of the Year (2015); 2× Sports Illustrated Sportsperson of the Year (2018, (Note: As part of the Golden State Warriors.) 2022); USA Basketball Male Athlete of the Year (2024); Consensus first-team All-American (2009); Consensus second-team All-American (2008); NCAA scoring champion (2009); 2× SoCon Player of the Year (2008, 2009); 3× First-team All-SoCon (2007–2009); No. 30 retired by Davidson Wildcats
- Stats at NBA.com
- Stats at Basketball Reference
Medals
Men's basketball
Representing the United States
Olympic Games
| Gold medal – first place | 2024 Paris | Team |
FIBA World Cup
| Gold medal – first place | 2010 Turkey | Team |
| Gold medal – first place | 2014 Spain | Team |
FIBA U-19 World Cup
| Silver medal – second place | 2007 Serbia | Team |

Wardell Stephen Curry II (/ˈstɛfən/ STEF-ən; born March 14, 1988), also known as Steph Curry (/ˈstɛf/ STEF), is an American professional basketball player for the Golden State Warriors of the National Basketball Association (NBA), where he plays as a point guard. Nicknamed "Chef Curry", he is widely regarded as the greatest shooter in basketball history and one of the greatest players of all time. He is credited with revolutionizing the game by popularizing the three-point shot across all levels of basketball.

Curry is a four-time NBA champion, a two-time NBA Most Valuable Player (MVP), an NBA Finals MVP, and a two-time NBA All-Star Game MVP. He is also a two-time NBA scoring champion, a 12-time NBA All-Star, and an 11-time All-NBA Team selection (including four on the First Team). Internationally, he has won two gold medals at the FIBA World Cup and a gold medal at the 2024 Summer Olympics as part of the U.S. national team.

Curry played collegiately for the Davidson Wildcats, where he was named Conference Player of the Year twice. He set the NCAA single-season record for three-pointers made (162) as a sophomore and led the NCAA Division I in scoring during his junior year. Curry was selected by the Warriors as the seventh overall pick in the 2009 NBA draft.

In 2014–15, Curry won his first league MVP award and led the Warriors to their first championship since 1975. The following season, he became the first player to be unanimously voted MVP and to lead the league in scoring while shooting above 50–40–90. That same year, the Warriors broke the record for most wins in a regular season (73) en route to the 2016 NBA Finals, where they lost a 3–1 series lead to the Cleveland Cavaliers. Curry then helped the Warriors win back-to-back titles in 2017 and 2018, and reach the 2019 NBA Finals, where they fell to the Toronto Raptors in six games. In 2021, Curry led the league in scoring for a second time in his career. The following season, Curry won his fourth championship and first Finals MVP award, leading the Warriors past the Boston Celtics in six games in the 2022 NBA Finals. That same season, he became the NBA's all-time leader in three-pointers made, surpassing Ray Allen.

Curry has the highest career free-throw percentage in NBA history (.912) and has led the league in three-pointers made a record eight times. In 2016, he broke his own record for three-pointers made in a regular season, with 402, and made at least one three-pointer in an NBA-record 268 consecutive games from 2018 to 2023.

Curry was named one of Time's 100 most influential people in the world in 2016 and has been listed by Forbes as one of the world's ten highest-paid athletes nine times. He has also been listed as the highest paid NBA player for a record nine consecutive seasons and has led the NBA in worldwide jersey sales six times.

== Early life, family and education ==
Curry was born on March 14, 1988, at Summa Health Akron Campus (Note: Then known as Akron City Hospital.) in downtown Akron, Ohio. His father, Wardell Stephen "Dell" Curry Sr. was a professional basketball player, and his mother, Sonya Alicia Curry (née Adams), is an educator and author. He grew up in Charlotte, North Carolina, where his father spent most of his NBA career with the Charlotte Hornets.

He played with his younger brother Seth on their backyard basketball court in Charlotte. The family briefly moved to Toronto, Canada, where Dell finished out his career as a member of the Toronto Raptors. During this time, Curry played for the Queensway Christian College boys' basketball team, leading them to an undefeated season. He was also a member of Toronto 5–0, a club team that plays across Ontario, pitting him against fellow future NBA players Cory Joseph and Kelly Olynyk. Curry led the team to a 33–4 record, en route to winning the provincial championship.

After Dell's retirement, the family moved back to Charlotte and Curry enrolled at Charlotte Christian School, where he was named all-conference and all-state, and led his team to three conference titles and three state playoff appearances. Because of his father's storied career at Virginia Tech, Curry wanted to play college basketball for the Hokies, but was only offered a walk-on spot due in part to his slender 160-pound frame. He ultimately chose to attend Davidson College, which had aggressively recruited him from the tenth grade.

== College career ==
=== Freshman season ===
Before Curry even played in his first game for the Wildcats, head coach Bob McKillop praised him at a Davidson alumni event, saying: "Wait 'til you see Steph Curry. He is something special." In his second collegiate game, he recorded a season-high 32 points and nine rebounds against Michigan. He had 30 points and a season-high 11 rebounds against Chattanooga on December 18, 2006, for his first career double-double. On February 6, 2007, also against Chattanooga, Curry broke the school's 500-point freshman record. He went on to finish with 730 points. He also broke Davidson's single-season record for three-pointers held by Brendan Winters (2004–05). He led the Southern Conference in scoring at 21.5 points per game, ranking him ninth nationally and second nationally among freshmen behind only Kevin Durant of Texas.

The Wildcats finished with a 29–5 record and a Southern Conference regular-season title. On March 2, in the Southern Conference tournament semi-finals against Furman, Curry made his 113th three-point field goal of the year, breaking Keydren Clark's NCAA freshman season record for three-pointers. On March 15, he scored a game-high 30 points in a first-round NCAA tournament loss to Maryland.

At the end of his freshman season, Curry was named Southern Conference Freshman of the Year, SoCon Tournament MVP, and selected to the SoCon All-tournament team, All-freshman team, and All-SoCon First Team. He was also an honorable mention in Sports Illustrated's All-Mid-Major.

=== Sophomore season ===
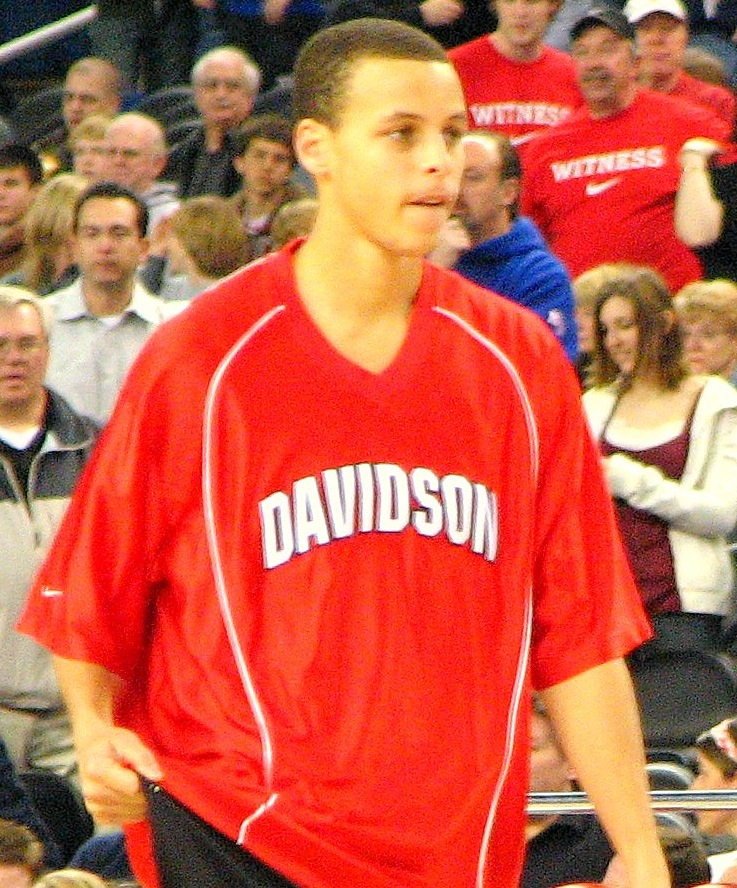
Curry at the 2008 NCAA tournament

In his sophomore season in 2007–08, Curry helped the Wildcats to a 26–6 regular-season record, a 20–0 conference record, and a trip to the 2008 NCAA tournament.

On March 21, 2008, Davidson matched up with seventh-seeded Gonzaga. Gonzaga led by 11 points early in the second half but Curry went on to score 30 points in the half to push Davidson to their first NCAA tournament win since 1969 with a score of 82–76. Curry ended the game with 40 points while also going 8-of-10 from three-point range. On March 23, Davidson played second-seeded Georgetown in the second round, with Curry scoring just five points in the first half of the game as Davidson trailed by as many as 17 points. His 25 second-half points led Davidson to a 74–70 comeback victory. On March 28, Curry led Davidson to another win, against third-seeded Wisconsin. He scored 33 points as Davidson won 73–56 to advance to the Elite 8. Curry joined Clyde Lovellette, Jerry Chambers, and Glenn Robinson as the only college players to score over 30 points in their first four career NCAA tournament games. Curry also tied Darrin Fitzgerald of Butler for the single-season record for most three-pointers with 158. On March 30, he set the record, against the top-seeded Kansas Jayhawks, with his 159th three-pointer of the season. Curry scored 25 points in the game but Davidson lost 59–57, and the Jayhawks went on to win the championship.

Curry finished the season averaging 25.9 points, 2.9 assists, and 2.1 steals per game. He was named to the Associated Press' All-America Second Team on March 31, 2008. He also was named the Most Outstanding Player of the Midwest Region of the NCAA tournament, becoming the first player from a team not making the Final Four to do so since Juwan Howard of Michigan in 1994. Curry was nominated for an ESPY in the Breakthrough Player of the Year category.

=== Junior season ===
Following Davidson's loss in the NCAA Regional Finals, Curry announced that he would return for his junior year. On November 18, 2008, he scored a career-high 44 points in Davidson's 82–78 loss to Oklahoma. He extended a career-long streak by scoring at least 25 points for the seventh straight game. On November 21, Curry registered a career-high 13 assists to go along with 30 points in Davidson's 97–70 win over Winthrop. On November 25, against Loyola, Curry was held scoreless as Loyola constantly double-teamed him. It was Curry's only scoreless collegiate game and only his second without double-digit points. He finished 0-of-3 from the field as Davidson won the game 78–48. In Davidson's next game 11 days later, Curry matched his career high of 44 in a 72–67 win over North Carolina State.

Curry surpassed the 2000-point mark for his career on January 3, 2009, as he scored 21 points against Samford. On February 14, 2009, Curry rolled his ankle in the second half of a win over Furman. The injury caused Curry to miss the February 18 game against The Citadel, the first and only game he missed in his college career. On February 28, 2009, Curry became Davidson's all-time leading scorer with 34 points in a 99–56 win against Georgia Southern. That gave Curry 2,488 points for his career, surpassing previous school leader John Gerdy. Davidson won the 2008–09 Southern Conference regular season championship for the South Division, finishing 18–2 in the conference.

In the 2009 Southern Conference tournament, Davidson played Appalachian State in the quarterfinals and won 84–68. Curry scored 43 points, which is the third most points in Southern Conference tournament history. In the semifinals, against the College of Charleston, Curry had 20 points but Davidson lost 52–59. Despite lobbying from Davidson head coach Bob McKillop and Charleston coach Bobby Cremins, the Wildcats failed to get an NCAA tournament bid. Instead, they received the sixth seed in the 2009 NIT. Davidson played the third seed, South Carolina, on the road in the first round. Curry scored 32 points as the Wildcats beat the Gamecocks 70–63. Davidson then lost 80–68 to the Saint Mary's Gaels in the second round. Curry registered 26 points, nine rebounds, and five assists in what was his final game for the Wildcats.

In his final season at Davidson, Curry averaged 28.6 points, 5.6 assists, and 2.5 steals. He was the NCAA scoring champion and was named a consensus first team All-American. Curry opted out of his senior year at Davidson to enter the 2009 NBA draft, but expressed his intention to complete his degree.

In May 2022, Curry completed his coursework and graduated with a Bachelor of Arts in Sociology. In a ceremony held on August 31, 2022, Curry became the first Davidson graduate to have his jersey number retired and was inducted into the Davidson Athletics Hall of Fame.

In March 2025, Davidson announced that Curry would serve as assistant general manager for basketball programs, alongside alum Matt Berman in an advisory role. They will share insights with student-athletes and create the eight-figure "Curry-Berman Fund" to support both men's and women's basketball, with contributions from Curry, his wife Ayesha, Berman, his sister Erica, and father Don.

== Professional career ==
=== Golden State Warriors (2009–present) ===
==== Early years (2009–2012) ====
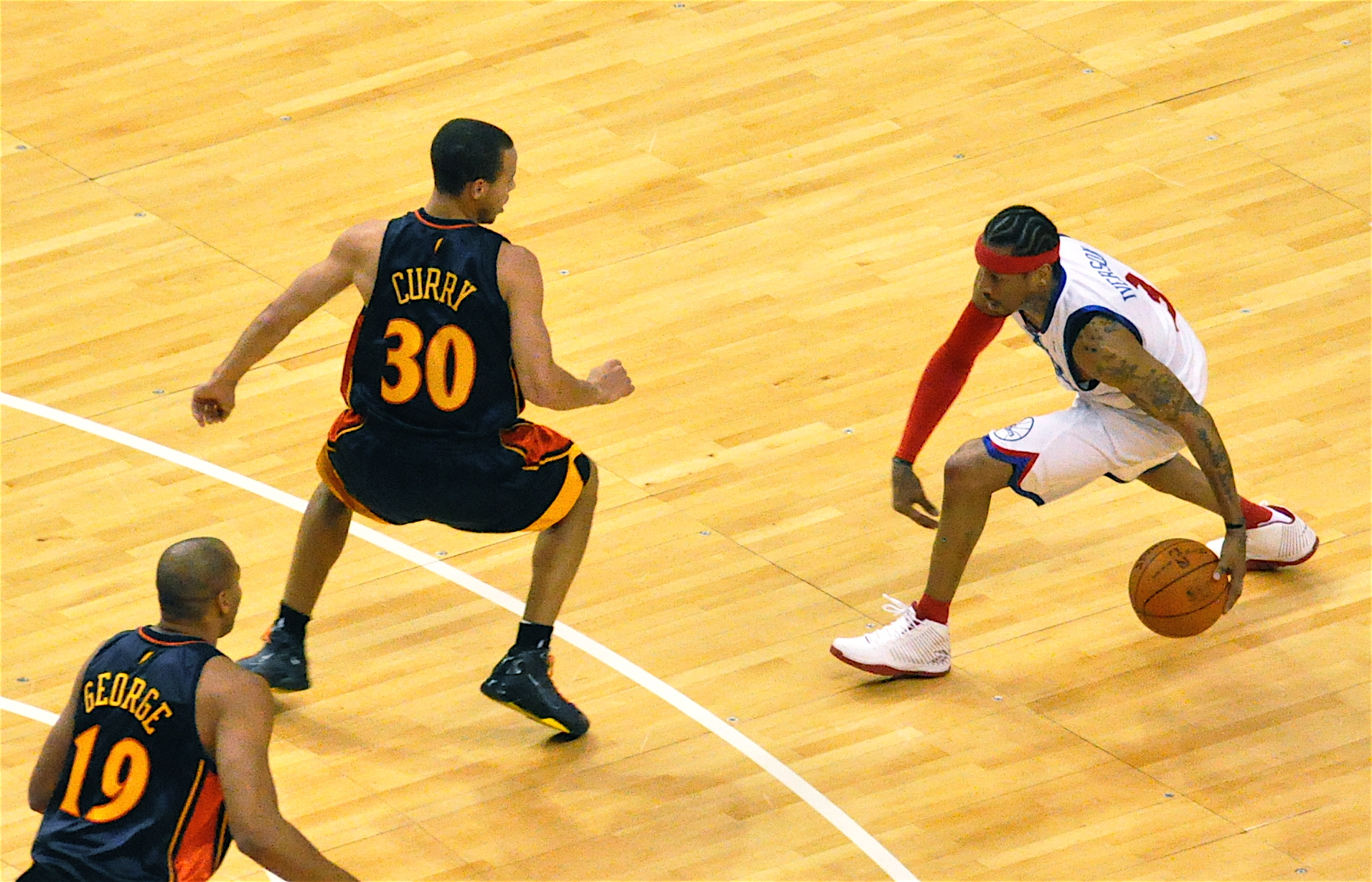
Curry defending against Allen Iverson in 2009

On June 25, 2009, his father's 45th birthday, Curry was selected as the seventh overall pick in the 2009 NBA draft by the Golden State Warriors. The day of the draft, Curry's father Dell, who wished for his son to be drafted with the eighth pick by the New York Knicks, called teams with higher picks and urged them not to draft his son. The Minnesota Timberwolves agreed not to draft Curry, and subsequently drafted two other point guards with the fifth and sixth picks. Warriors head coach Don Nelson chose to disregard Dell's wishes and drafted him anyway, one pick before the Knicks would have the opportunity to. Although the Warriors already had another lean, 6-foot-3, offensive-minded guard in Monta Ellis, Nelson had a penchant for using small lineups in his Nellie Ball system, and had warmed to the idea of selecting Curry. However, Ellis announced at a media session that he and Curry were too small to play together. Curry appeared in 80 games (77 starts) during the 2009–10 season, averaging 17.5 points, 4.5 rebounds, 5.9 assists, and 1.90 steals in 36.2 minutes.

His second half of the season vaulted him into the rookie of the year race. He was named Western Conference Rookie of the Month for January, March, and April, finishing as the only Western Conference rookie to win the award three times. He finished runner-up for the NBA Rookie of the Year behind Tyreke Evans and was a unanimous NBA All-Rookie First Team selection, becoming the first Warriors player since Jason Richardson in 2001–02 to earn All-Rookie First Team honors. He scored 30-plus points eight times, setting the most 30-point games by any rookie in 2009–10 and the most since LeBron James had 13 and Carmelo Anthony had 10 in 2003–04. Curry had five 30-point/10-assist games, which tied Michael Jordan for the second-most 30-point/10-assist games by a rookie (Oscar Robertson is first with 25). He became just the sixth rookie in NBA history to post a 35-point, 10-assist, 10-rebound game when he registered his first career triple-double with 36 points, 13 assists, and 10 rebounds against the Los Angeles Clippers on February 10. In the Warriors' season finale against the Portland Trail Blazers on April 14, in a game where the Warriors won despite only having six healthy players entering the game and were forced to suit two injured teammates to meet the NBA's minimum of eight active players, Curry recorded a then-career-high 42 points, nine rebounds and eight assists, becoming the first rookie since Robertson in February 1961 to register at least those numbers in each category in the same game. Curry finished his rookie season with 166 three-pointers, which were, at the time, the most ever by a rookie in NBA history.

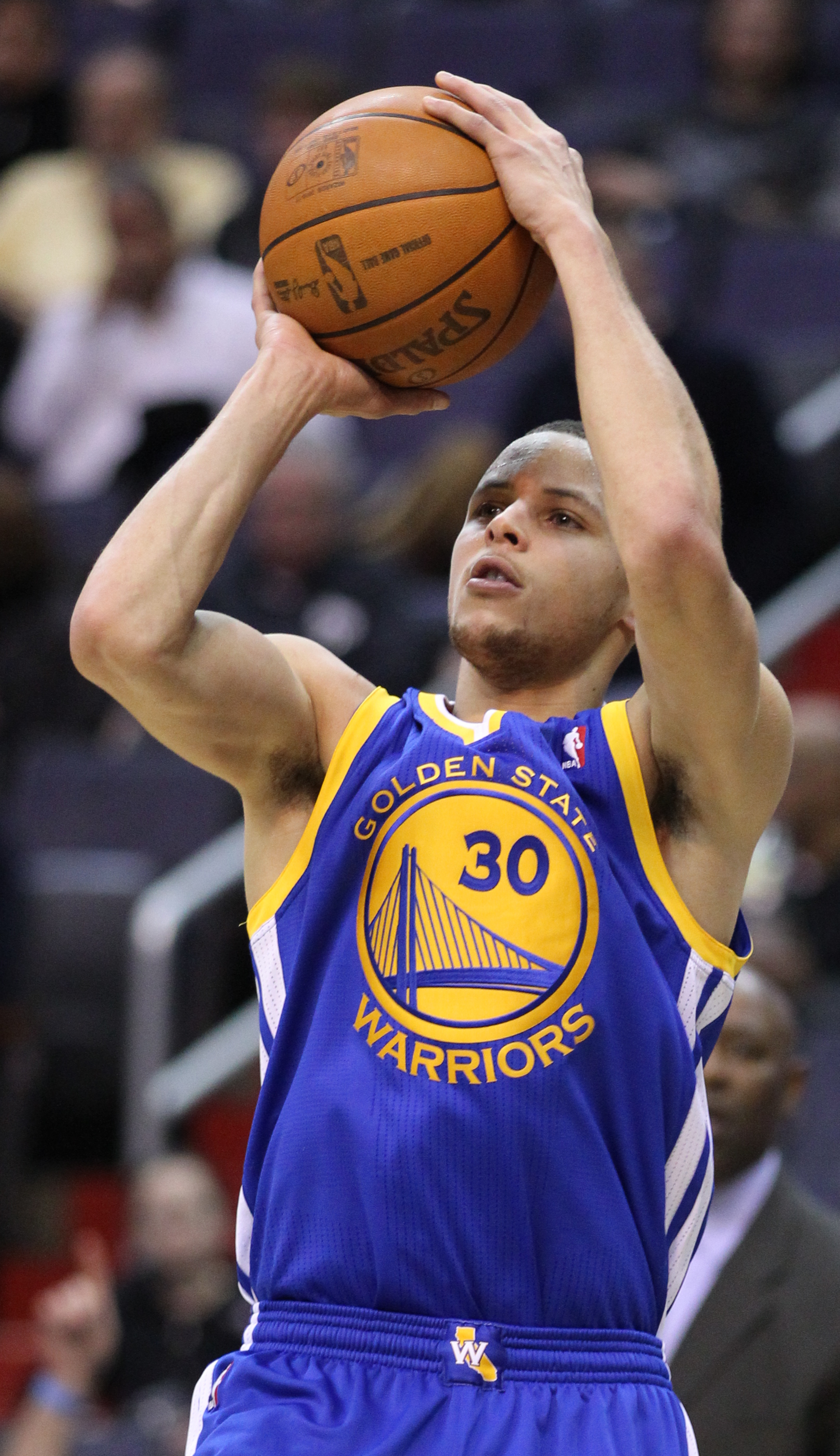
Curry in March 2011

In 2010–11, Curry appeared in 74 games (all starts), averaging 18.6 points, 3.9 rebounds, 5.8 assists, and 1.47 steals in 33.6 minutes per contest. His free throw percentage of .934 (212–227 FT) set a new Warriors single-season record, surpassing the previous mark of .924 set by Rick Barry in 1977–78. He also became the first Warriors player to lead the NBA in free throw percentage since Mark Price in 1996–97. Curry registered 20-or-more points 35 times, including seven 30-plus performances. He posted a season-high 39 points and a then-career-high 14 made field goals (on 20 attempts) against the Oklahoma City Thunder on December 5. In February 2011, during All-Star Weekend, Curry won the Skills Challenge and registered 13 points, eight assists, and six rebounds in 28 minutes as a member of the Sophomore squad in the Rookie Challenge. In May 2011, he was named the recipient of the NBA Sportsmanship Award, and underwent surgery on his right ankle.

In the lockout-shortened 2011–12 season, Curry appeared in 26 games (23 starts), averaging 14.7 points, 3.4 rebounds, 5.3 assists, and 1.50 steals in 28.2 minutes per contest. He missed 40 games due to right ankle and foot injuries, including the last 28 games with a sprained right ankle and subsequent surgery on the ankle, which was performed on April 25. In 2012, Golden State included Curry in a trade offer to the Milwaukee Bucks for Andrew Bogut, which the Bucks rejected due to Curry's history with bad ankles. Ellis was traded instead. According to then-Warriors general manager Larry Riley, they offered Curry with the intention of steering the deal to Ellis. The deal opened an opportunity for Curry to lead the team.

==== First All-Star and playoff appearances (2012–2014) ====
Prior to the start of the 2012–13 season, Curry signed a four-year, $44 million contract extension with the Warriors. At the time, many basketball writers considered the move risky for Golden State because of Curry's injury history. Over the course of the year, Curry and backcourt teammate Klay Thompson gained a reputation for their perimeter scoring, earning them the nickname the "Splash Brothers". In 2012–13, Curry appeared in 78 games (all starts), averaging then-career-high 22.9 points (seventh in NBA), 6.9 assists, 4.0 rebounds, and 1.6 steals in 38.2 minutes. He set a new NBA single-season three-point record with 272 three-pointers, eclipsing the previous mark set by Ray Allen (269 in 2005–06), doing so on 53 less attempts than Allen did with Seattle.

Curry earned Western Conference Player of the Month honors for the month of April. During this time he averaged 25.4 points, 8.1 assists, 3.9 rebounds, and 2.13 steals in eight games in the final month of the season to become the third Warrior to win the award, joining Chris Mullin (November 1990 and January 1989) and Bernard King (January 1981). On February 25, Curry recorded a then-career-high 54 points and then-franchise-record 11 made three-pointers in a 109–105 loss to the New York Knicks, becoming the first player in NBA history to register at least 50 points and 10 three-pointers in a game. The game is cited as the "breakthrough" performance and one of the most notable games in Curry's career. On April 12, he scored 47 points in a 118–116 loss to the Los Angeles Lakers.

In 2013, Curry appeared in the playoffs for the first time in his career, with the Warriors earning the sixth seed in the Western Conference. In 12 playoff games (all starts), he averaged 23.4 points, 8.1 assists, and 3.8 rebounds. He set a new franchise record with 42 playoff three-pointers, eclipsing the Warriors' career playoff mark of 29 previously held by Jason Richardson, giving him a total of 314 three-pointers for the season to become the first player in NBA history to make at least 300 three-pointers in a single season.

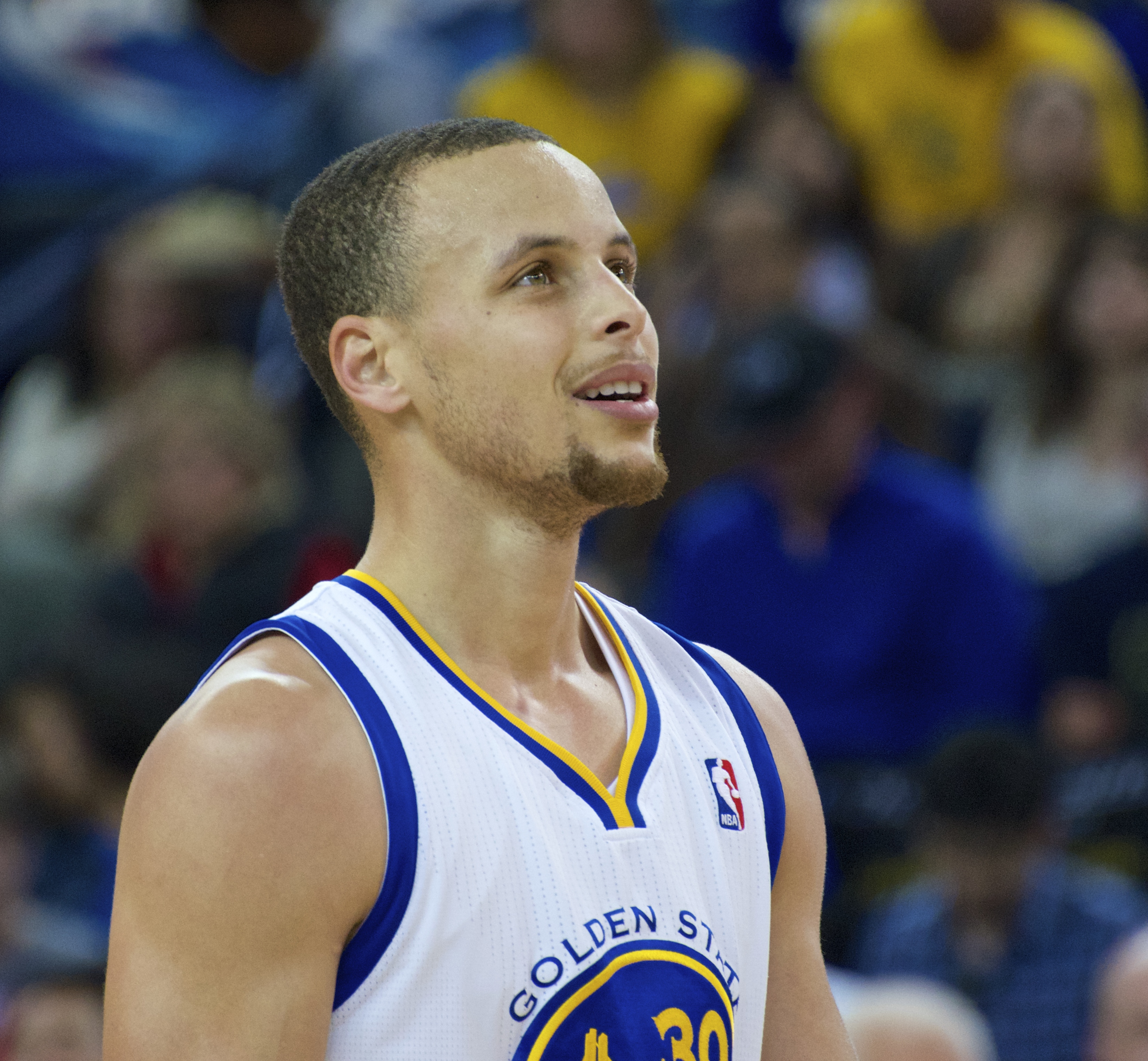
Curry in April 2014

In 2013–14, Curry appeared in 78 games (all starts), averaging career highs of 24.0 points (seventh in the NBA) and 8.5 assists (fifth in the NBA) to go with 4.3 rebounds and 1.63 steals, becoming the first player in Warriors franchise history to average 24 points and eight assists in a single season (ninth player in NBA history). He led the league in three-pointers made for a second consecutive season with 261, becoming the first player since Ray Allen in 2001–02 and 2002–03 to lead the league in three-pointers in back-to-back seasons. He was named Western Conference Player of the Month for April and earned All-NBA Second Team honors, becoming the first Warriors player named to the First or Second Team since 1993–94. On December 7 against the Memphis Grizzlies, Curry eclipsed Jason Richardson (700) as the franchise's leader in career three-pointers. In February, he made his first All-Star appearance, becoming the Warriors' first All-Star starter since Latrell Sprewell in 1995. He scored a season-high 47 points on April 13 against the Portland Trail Blazers for his third 40-point game of the year. He finished the regular season tied for second in the NBA in triple-doubles with four, the most by a Warrior in a single season since Chamberlain had five in 1963–64. Seeded sixth for the second consecutive postseason, the Warriors were defeated in seven games by the Los Angeles Clippers.

==== NBA championship and MVP (2014–2015) ====
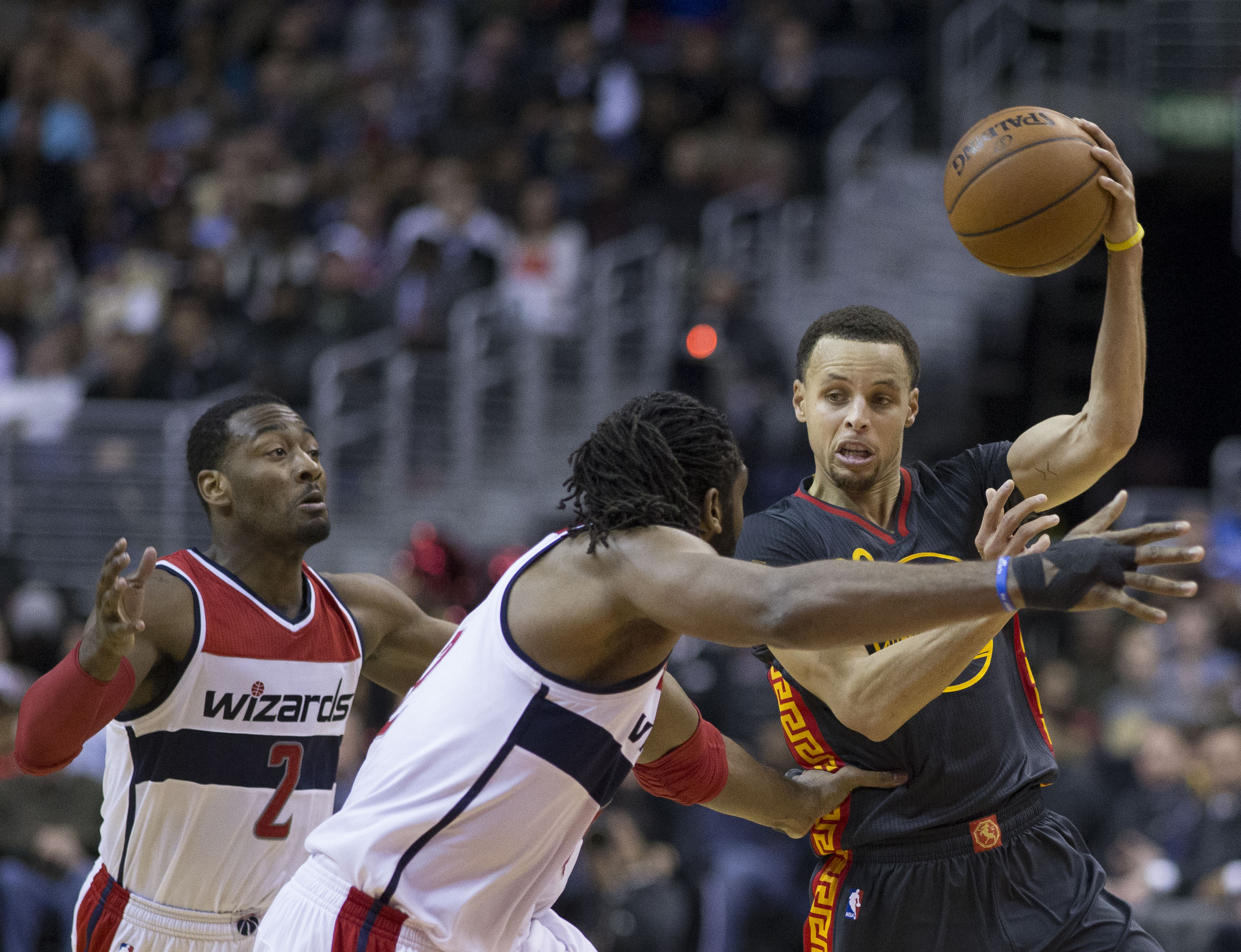
Curry attempting a pass while being guarded by John Wall and Nenê. Curry averaged 7.7 assists per game during the 2014–15 regular season, the sixth-highest in the league.

Prior to the start of the 2014–15 season, the Warriors hired former NBA player and general manager Steve Kerr as their new head coach. Kerr implemented significant changes to Golden State's schemes, including playing at a faster pace and giving Curry more freedom to shoot, helping the team evolve into a title contender. On February 4, Curry scored a season-high 51 points in a win over the Dallas Mavericks. He was the leading vote-getter for the All-Star Game and won the Three-Point Contest on All-Star Saturday night. On April 9, he broke his own league record for three-pointers made in a season during a game against the Portland Trail Blazers. The Warriors finished the year with 67 wins and Curry was voted the NBA Most Valuable Player after posting averages of 23.8 points, 7.7 assists, and 2 steals per game. Over the course of the season, he sat out 17 fourth quarters due to Golden State's wide margins of victory.

In Game 5 of the conference semifinals against the Memphis Grizzlies, Curry became the first player in league history to register six three-pointers and six steals in a game. In Game 6, he made a playoff career-high 8 three-pointers en route to a series-clinching victory. In Game 3 of the conference finals against the Houston Rockets, he broke the NBA record for most three-pointers made in a single postseason. The Warriors went on to defeat the Rockets to earn a Finals matchup with the Cleveland Cavaliers, where Curry struggled to start the series, converting on only 22 percent of his field goals in Game 2. In Game 5, he scored 37 points, and in Game 6, Golden State closed out the series to win their first championship in 40 years. For the Finals, Curry averaged 26 points and 6.3 assists per game. The Warriors' playoff run was the first in which an All-NBA first team selection eliminated all other first team selections en route to a championship.

==== Unanimous MVP and historic season (2015–2016) ====
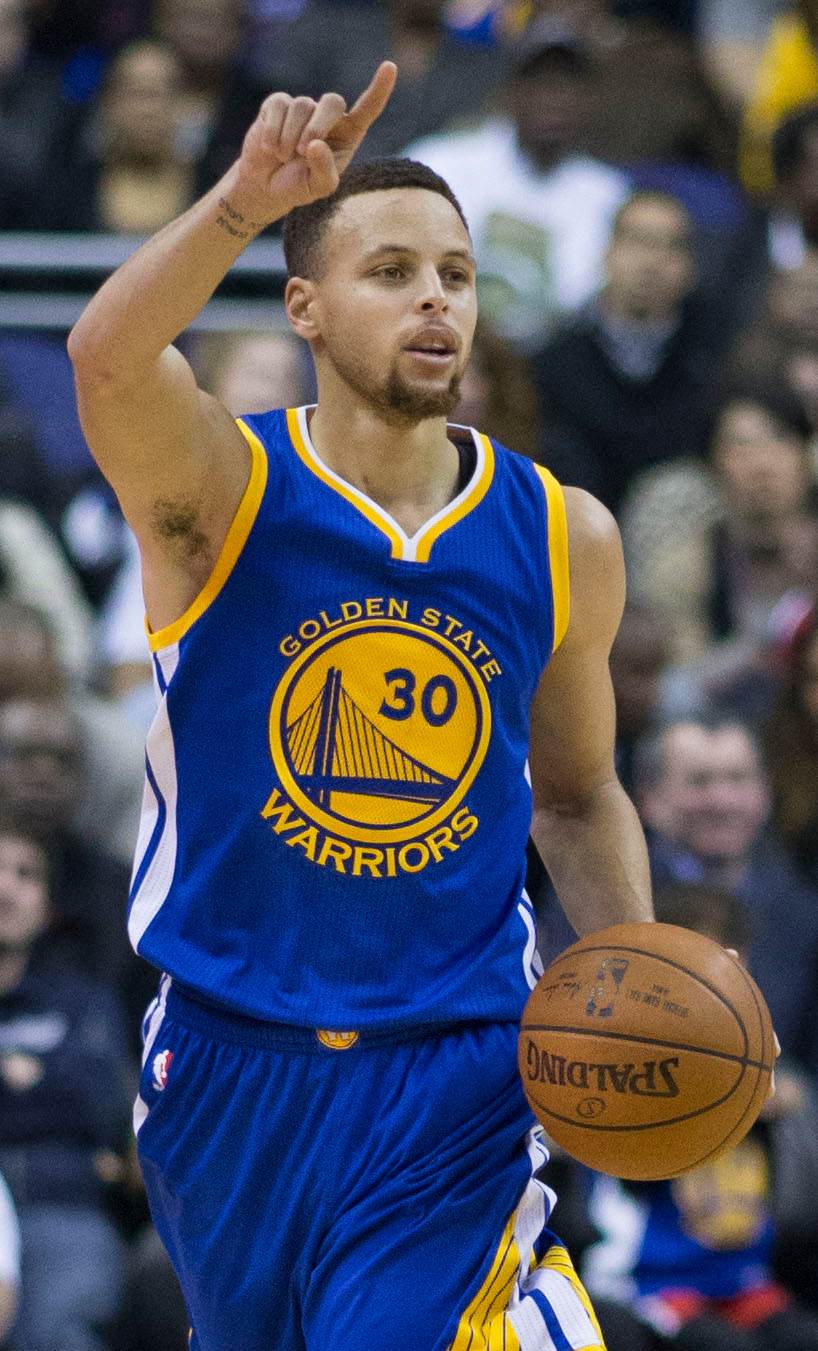
Curry in February 2016

To start the 2015–16 season, Curry became the first player since Michael Jordan in 1989–90 to score 118 points in his team's first three games, including a season-high 53 points against the New Orleans Pelicans in the third game. The Warriors made NBA history on November 24 when they became the first team ever to start 16–0 with a win over the Los Angeles Lakers, before improving to 24–0 on December 11 with a double-overtime win over the Boston Celtics. Their streak was broken the following day against the Milwaukee Bucks. On December 28, Curry recorded his sixth career triple-double with 23 points, a career-high 14 rebounds, and 10 assists in a 122–103 win over the Sacramento Kings. During the game, Curry was guarded by his brother Seth for the first time in their NBA careers. On January 22, he recorded his second triple-double of the season with 39 points, 12 assists, and 10 rebounds in a 122–110 win over the Indiana Pacers. He made eight three-pointers in the game to reach 200 for the season, becoming the first player in NBA history to make 200 three-pointers in four straight seasons. On February 3, he made 11 three-pointers (including seven in the first quarter) and scored 51 points (including a career-high 36 points in the first half) to lead the Warriors past the Washington Wizards 134–121. His 51 points tied Gilbert Arenas and Michael Jordan for the Verizon Center record.

During the 2016 NBA All-Star Weekend, Curry competed in his third straight All-Star game for the West, and competed in the Three-Point Contest, where he lost in the final round to teammate Klay Thompson. At 48–4, the Warriors entered the All-Star break with the best record through 52 games in NBA history, one win better than the 1995–96 Chicago Bulls and 1966–67 Philadelphia 76ers.

On February 25, Curry scored 51 points and made 10 three-pointers to lead the Warriors past the Orlando Magic 130–114, becoming the first player to record at least three 50-point games since LeBron James and Dwyane Wade in 2008–09. He also became the first player in NBA history to score at least 50 points in a game with only one free throw attempted. Curry surpassed Kyle Korver's record of 127 consecutive games with a made three-pointer. In the following game, two days later, Curry scored 46 points and made a 38-foot game-winning jump shot with 0.6 seconds remaining, to lead the Warriors past the Oklahoma City Thunder in overtime 121–118. He tied the then-single-game three-point scoring record (12) held by Kobe Bryant and Donyell Marshall and broke his own NBA record for made three-pointers in a season, setting a new mark at 288. He also became the first player in NBA history with at least 10 made three-pointers in consecutive games. Dubbed the "Double Bang" by play-by-play broadcaster Mike Breen, the shot is regarded among the most memorable basketball calls of all time. In February 2016, Curry averaged over 35 points per game, while shooting at least 50 percent from both the field and three-point range, becoming the first player in NBA history to achieve this feat in a calendar month. On March 7, in a win over the Magic, Curry scored 41 points and became the first player in NBA history to make 300 regular-season three-pointers. On April 1, Curry missed a three-pointer to tie the game against the Celtics with 5.3 seconds left, as the Warriors suffered their first home defeat since January 27, 2015, snapping an NBA-record 54-game winning streak in the regular season at Oracle Arena. On April 7, Curry scored 27 points to help the Warriors become the second team in NBA history to win 70 games in a season with a 112–101 win over the San Antonio Spurs. Three days later in a rematch against the Spurs, Curry scored 37 points in a 92–86 win, not only tying the 1996 Bulls, but snapping San Antonio's undefeated home streak and also ending a long losing streak in AT&T Center.

In the Warriors' regular-season finale on April 13 against the Memphis Grizzlies, Curry scored 46 points with 10 made three-pointers, finishing with a record 402 three-pointers on the season. With a 125–104 win over the Grizzlies, the Warriors became the first 73-win team in NBA history, surpassing the 1995–96 Chicago Bulls' 72–10 record to finish the 2015–16 season with just nine losses. With the conclusion of the regular season, Curry became the seventh player in NBA history to join the 50–40–90 club and the first to achieve this feat while averaging over 30 points per game. Curry led the league in scoring (30.1 points per game), steals (2.14), and free throw percentage (.908), becoming the first player to lead all three statistics in a season. For his record-breaking season, Curry was named the league's first ever unanimous MVP, becoming the 11th player in history to win the award in consecutive seasons and the first guard to do so since Steve Nash in 2004–05 and 2005–06. His scoring average increase of 6.3 is the largest ever by a reigning MVP.

In the 2016 playoffs, the Warriors defeated the Houston Rockets in the first round despite Curry only playing in the first half of Games 1 and 4 due to injury. A right MCL injury kept him out of the first three games of the second round. In Game 4 of the second-round series against the Portland Trail Blazers, Curry came off the bench to score 40 points in a 132–125 overtime win; 17 of those points came in the extra period, a then NBA record for points scored by an individual in overtime. Curry led the Warriors to a 4–1 victory over the Trail Blazers, as they moved on to the Western Conference finals to face the Oklahoma City Thunder. After going down 3–1, he helped the Warriors rally to win the series 4–3 and advance to their second straight NBA Finals.

In the Finals, Curry's play relative to his regular season performance remained inconsistent, as it had been since he returned from injury against Portland; still, he broke Danny Green's record of 27 three-pointers made in a Finals. Despite being up 3–1 in the series, the Warriors were defeated by the Cleveland Cavaliers in seven games and became the first team in NBA Finals history to lose a series after leading 3–1. In the game seven loss, Curry scored 17 points on 6-of-19 shooting.

==== Back-to-back championships (2016–2018) ====
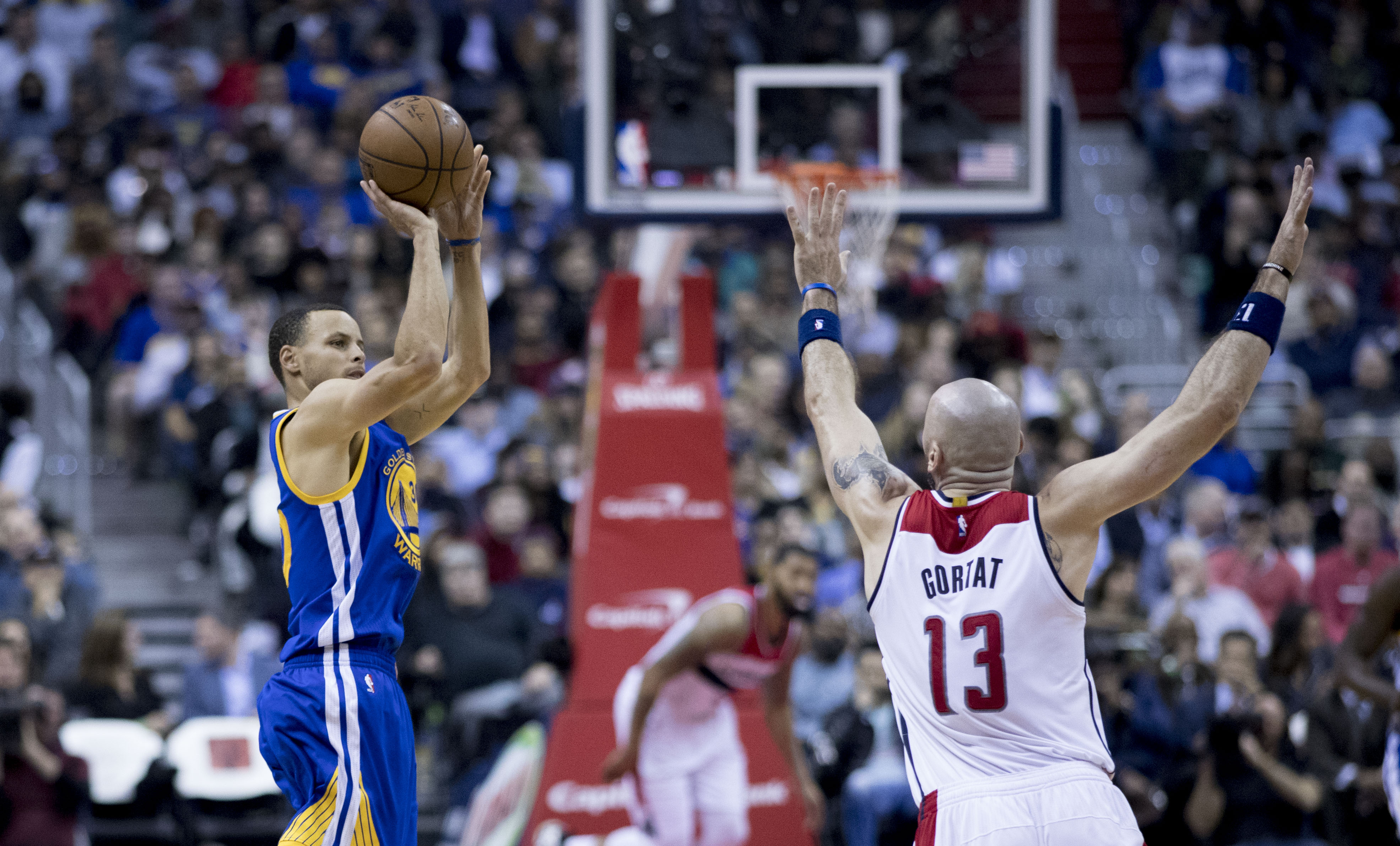
Curry shooting over Marcin Gortat in February 2017

On October 28, 2016, Curry hit four three-pointers against the New Orleans Pelicans to reach 1,600 for his career, becoming the 19th player to do so, as well as the fastest to reach the mark. On November 4, Curry's NBA-record streak of 157 straight games with at least one made three-pointer was snapped during the Warriors' 117–97 loss to the Los Angeles Lakers after he went 0-of-10 from three-point range. He had hit a three-pointer in every regular-season game since November 11, 2014. Three days later, he hit 13 three-pointers against New Orleans, becoming the first player in NBA history to make as many three-pointers in a regular-season game. Curry shot 16-of-26 overall against the Pelicans for his first 40-point game of the season, finishing with 46 in a 116–106 win. On December 11, Curry hit 2 three-pointers against the Minnesota Timberwolves to pass Steve Nash for 17th on the NBA's career three-pointers list.

With 14 points against the Dallas Mavericks on December 30, Curry (11,903) passed Purvis Short (11,894) for seventh place on the Warriors' all-time scoring list. In a loss to the Memphis Grizzlies on January 6, 2017, Curry had his second 40-point game of the season and reached the 12,000-point threshold, becoming the seventh player in Warriors franchise history to score 12,000 career points. On January 19, Curry was named a starter on the Western Conference All-Star team for the 2017 NBA All-Star Game. On February 2, he hit his 200th three-pointer of the season in the Warriors' 133–120 win over the Los Angeles Clippers, making him the first player in NBA history to have 200 or more three-pointers in five consecutive seasons. On March 5, he scored 31 points and moved into the top 10 on the NBA's career three-point list in a 112–105 win over the New York Knicks. Curry hit 5 three-pointers, passing Chauncey Billups for 10th place.

Curry helped the Warriors sweep through the first two rounds of the playoffs. In Game 1 of the Western Conference finals against the San Antonio Spurs, Curry scored 40 points and hit a tying three-pointer with 1:48 remaining to help the Warriors rally from a 25-point deficit to win 113–111; the Warriors overcame their largest halftime deficit ever in the postseason at 20 points. This was the second time in the season that the Warriors came back from a 20-point deficit against the Spurs. In a 120–108 Game 3 win, Curry scored 21 points and became the franchise leader in postseason points, passing Rick Barry. They went up 3–0 in the series, becoming the third team in NBA history to win their first 11 playoff games. His 36 points in Game 4 led to a 129–115 victory that saw the Warriors advance to the NBA Finals for a third straight year while becoming the first team in league history to start the playoffs 12–0. In Game 2 of the 2017 NBA Finals against the Cleveland Cavaliers, Curry recorded his first career postseason triple-double with 32 points, 11 assists and 10 rebounds to help the Warriors go up 2–0 in the series with a 132–113 win. Curry helped the Warriors clinch the series and the championship in Game 5 with 34 points, 10 assists, and six rebounds, as Golden State claimed its second title in three years.

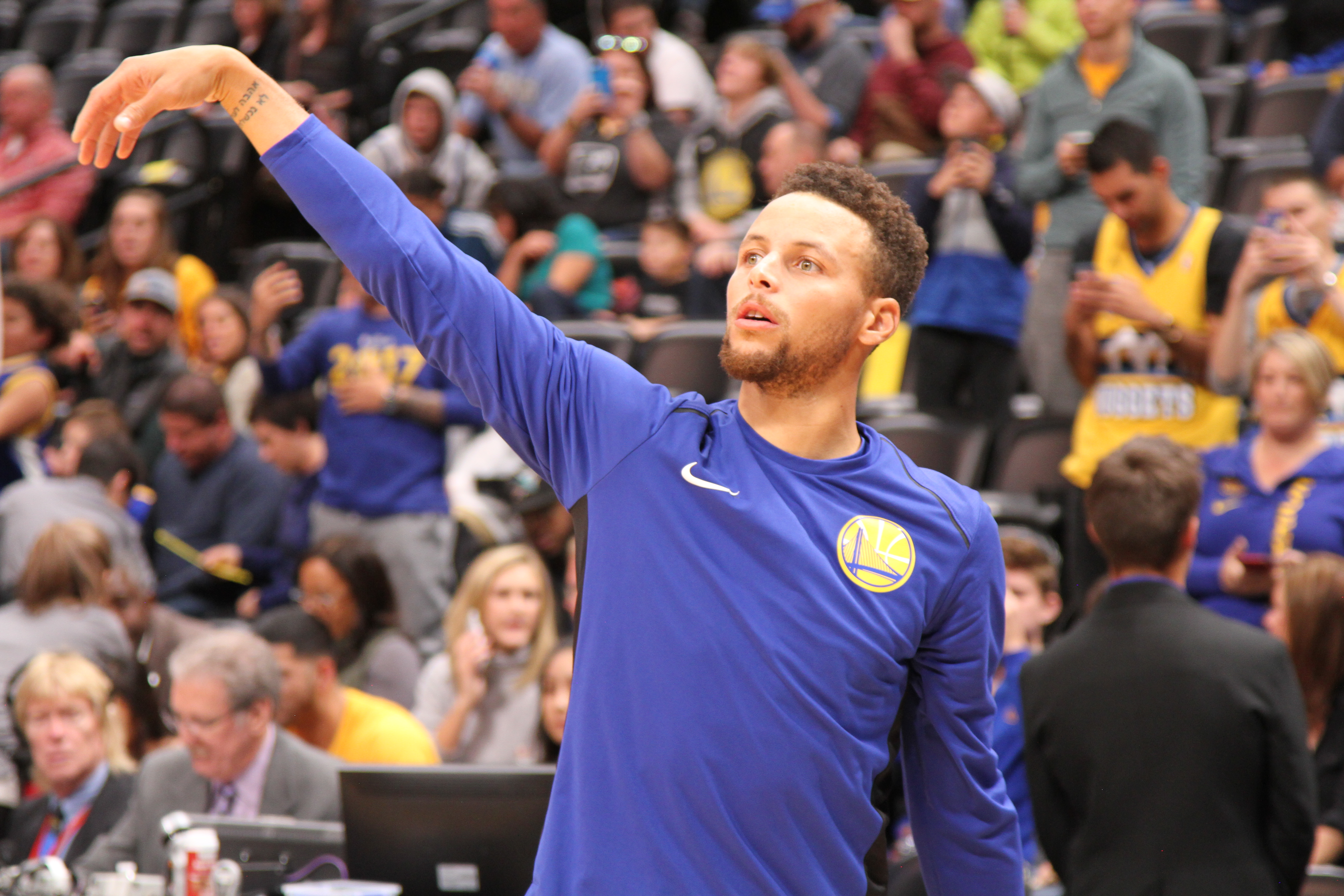
Curry warming up prior to a game in November 2017

On July 1, 2017, Curry agreed to a five-year, $201 million extension with the Warriors, becoming the first NBA player to sign a supermax contract worth over $200 million. He officially signed the contract on July 25. On December 1, he scored 23 points and passed Jason Kidd for eighth place on the career three-pointers made list in a 133–112 win over the Orlando Magic. On December 4, in a 125–115 win over the New Orleans Pelicans, Curry hit 5 three-pointers to become the fastest player in NBA history to eclipse 2,000 career three-pointers, achieving the mark in just 597 games, 227 less than the previous fastest player to do so, Ray Allen. In that same game, Curry injured his right ankle and subsequently missed 11 games, returning to action on December 30 and scoring 38 points with a season-high 10 three-pointers in a 141–128 win over the Memphis Grizzlies. Curry shot 13 of 17 and 10 of 13 from deep in 26 minutes for his ninth 30-point game of the season. It also marked Curry's ninth career game with 10 or more 3s, the most by any player in NBA history.

On January 6, in a 121–105 win over the Los Angeles Clippers, Curry scored 45 points in three quarters. On January 25, he scored 25 points in a 126–113 win over the Minnesota Timberwolves. Curry became the fifth player in Warriors franchise history to score 14,000 points, ending the game with 14,023 and joining Wilt Chamberlain (17,783), Rick Barry (16,447), Paul Arizin (16,266), and Chris Mullin (16,235) on the franchise list. On January 27, he scored 49 points—with 13 of those over the final 1:42—and hit 8 three-pointers, lifting the Warriors past the Boston Celtics 109–105. On February 22, he had a 44-point effort with 8 three-pointers in a 134–127 win over the Los Angeles Clippers. It was his third 40-point game of the season. On March 2, in a 114–109 win over the Atlanta Hawks, Curry made his 200th three-point field goal of the season, becoming the first player in NBA history with at least 200 three-pointers in six seasons, having reached the mark in every season since 2012–13. Four days later, in a 114–101 win over the Nets, Curry became the seventh player in Warriors franchise history to make 5,000 career field goals, joining Chamberlain, Barry, Mullin, Arizin, Jeff Mullins, and Nate Thurmond.

On March 23, against the Hawks, Curry suffered a Grade 2 medial collateral ligament (MCL) sprain to his left knee. He subsequently missed nearly six weeks, returning to action in Game 2 of the Warriors' second-round playoff series against the Pelicans. He came off the bench to score 28 points in a 121–116 win. In Game 3 of the Western Conference finals, Curry scored 35 points with 5 three-pointers in a 126–85 win over the Houston Rockets. The 41-point victory was the largest in franchise history during the postseason. In Game 6, Curry scored 29 points with 5 three-pointers, as the Warriors rallied from an early 17-point deficit to stave off elimination with a 115–86 victory over the Rockets. In Game 7, Curry recorded 27 points, 10 assists, and nine rebounds, as the Warriors earned a fourth straight trip to the NBA Finals by beating the Rockets 101–92.

In Game 2 of the NBA Finals, Curry hit a Finals-record 9 three-pointers and scored 33 points in a 122–103 win over the Cavaliers. In Game 4, Curry led all scorers with 37 points in a 108–85 win that helped the Warriors clinch their second straight championship with a series sweep over the Cavaliers. Many felt that he should have won Finals MVP. In response, Curry stated: "At the end of the day, I'm not going to let a [Finals] MVP trophy define my career. Three titles ... Wherever that puts us in the conversation in the history of the NBA ... I'm a three-time champ." Rohan Nadkarni of Sports Illustrated argued that "the Golden State dynasty started with Stephen Curry. He, for numerous reasons stretching from his incredible talent to his previous ankle injuries, put the Warriors in place to win their third championship in four seasons."

==== Fifth consecutive NBA Finals (2018–2019) ====
On October 21, 2018, Curry had 30 points and 6 three-pointers in a 100–98 loss to the Denver Nuggets, thus moving past Paul Pierce for sixth place on the NBA's career three-point list. Three days later, he scored 51 points with 11 three-pointers in only three quarters in a 144–122 win over the Washington Wizards. He scored 31 in the first half and finished with his sixth career 50-point game and made 10 or more 3s for the 10th time. Curry's third three-pointer of the night moved him past Jamal Crawford (2,153) for fifth place on the NBA's career three-point list. On October 28, he made seven three-pointers and finished with 35 points in a 120–114 win over the Brooklyn Nets. Over the first seven games of the season, he made at least 5 three-pointers in all seven games, breaking George McCloud's record of six games in a row during the 1995–96 season. The Warriors started the season with a 10–1 record. On November 8 against the Milwaukee Bucks, Curry left the game during the third quarter with a groin injury and the Warriors were unable to recover in a 134–111 loss. Without Curry, the Warriors dropped to 12–7 on November 21 after enduring their first four-game losing streak since March 2013. The Warriors ended November with a 15–8 record, with Curry's strained left groin sidelining him for 11 straight games.

Despite Curry's 27 points in his return to the line-up on December 1, the Warriors were defeated 111–102 by the Detroit Pistons. On December 17, he scored 20 points in a 110–93 win over the Memphis Grizzlies, becoming just the fifth player in Warriors franchise history to score 15,000 points during the regular season, joining Wilt Chamberlain (17,783), Rick Barry (16,447), Paul Arizin (16,266), and Chris Mullin (16,235). On December 23, he scored 42 points and made a layup with 0.5 seconds left to lift the Warriors to a 129–127 win over the Los Angeles Clippers. On January 5, he had 10 three-pointers and scored 20 of his 42 points in the fourth quarter of the Warriors' 127–123 win over the Sacramento Kings. On January 11, in a 146–109 win over the Chicago Bulls, Curry made 5 three-pointers to surpass Jason Terry (2,282) and move into third place all-time in NBA history behind Ray Allen (2,973) and Reggie Miller (2,560). Two days later, he scored 48 points and hit a season high-tying 11 three-pointers in a 119–114 win over the Dallas Mavericks. On January 16, he scored 41 points with 9 three-pointers to become the first player in NBA history to make eight or more 3s in three straight games, as the Warriors defeated the New Orleans Pelicans 147–140. On January 31, he scored 41 points with 10 three-pointers in a 113–104 loss to the Philadelphia 76ers. On February 21, he scored 36 points with 10 three-pointers in a 125–123 win over the Kings. On March 16 against the Oklahoma City Thunder, Curry reached 16,000 career points. On March 29, he made 11 three-pointers and scored 37 points in a 131–130 overtime loss to the Minnesota Timberwolves. On April 2, in a 116–102 win over the Nuggets, Curry made 5 or more three-pointers in a career-best nine straight games and moved past Mullin for fourth place on the Warriors all-time points list. On April 5, he scored 40 points in a 120–114 win over the Cleveland Cavaliers, thus moving past Arizin for third place on the Warriors all-time points list.

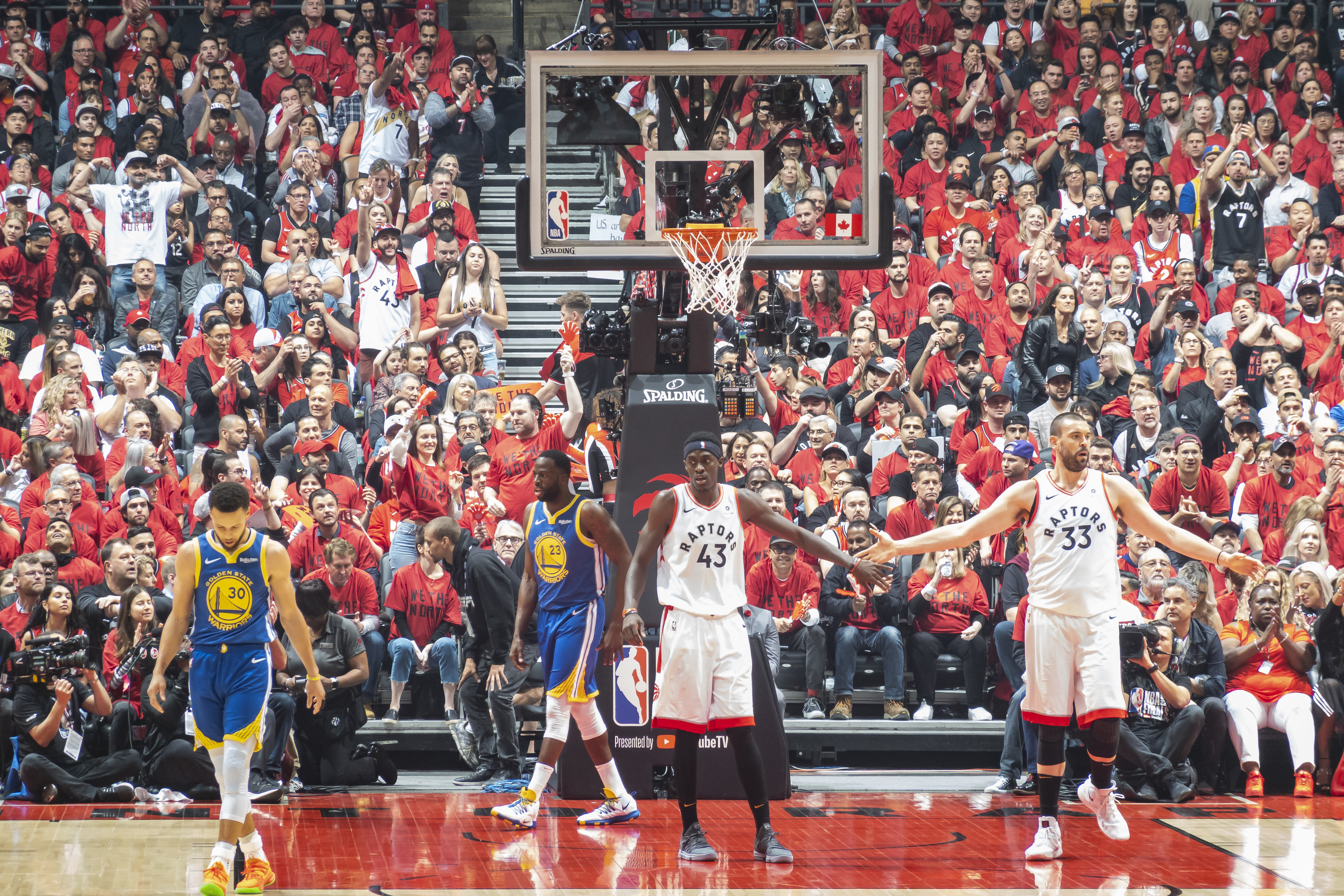
Curry in the Game 2 of the 2019 NBA Finals versus the Toronto Raptors

The Warriors entered the playoffs as the first seed in the Western Conference with a 57–25 record. In Game 1 of the Warriors' first-round playoff series against the Clippers, Curry scored 38 points and made 8 three-pointers to give him the most in postseason history, passing Ray Allen (385). He also had a postseason career-high 15 rebounds and seven assists in a 121–104 win. In Game 6 of the second round, Curry bounced back from the first scoreless first half of his playoff career to score 33 points in the last two quarters to help the Warriors eliminate the Houston Rockets with a 118–113 win and advance to the Western Conference finals. In Game 1 of the conference finals, Curry matched his postseason career high with 9 three-pointers to finish with 36 points in a 116–94 win over the Portland Trail Blazers. Curry faced his brother Seth in that Finals series, making them the first set of brothers to face each other in an NBA playoff series. He averaged a series career-high 36.5 points to help the Warriors sweep the Trail Blazers. It was the highest average by a player in a four-game sweep in NBA history. Curry became the sixth player in NBA history to score 35 or more in the first four games of a series. (Note: He joined Elgin Baylor, LeBron James (twice), Michael Jordan (twice), Bernard King, and Jerry West.) In Game 4, he had 37 points, 12 rebounds, and 11 assists in a 119–117 overtime win, as he and Draymond Green became the first teammates in league history to have a triple-double in the same playoff game. In Game 3 of the 2019 Finals, Curry scored a playoff career-high 47 points to go with eight rebounds and seven assists in a 123–109 loss to the Toronto Raptors. In Game 5, he helped the Warriors stave off elimination with 31 points in a 106–105 win, cutting the Raptors' series lead to 3–2. In Game 6, Curry scored 21 points, but shot just 6 for 17 and went 3 of 11 on three-pointers, including missing a contested three-pointer in the waning moments, as the Warriors lost the game and the series with a 114–110 defeat.

==== Injury and comeback (2019–2021) ====
Curry was expected to take on a greater offensive load in the 2019–20 season with Thompson out injured and Kevin Durant having left the Warriors as a free agent. On October 30, 2019, against the Phoenix Suns in the fourth game of the season, Curry drove to the basket and collided with the Suns' Aron Baynes, who was trying to take a charge. Baynes fell on Curry's left hand, which required surgery to repair his broken second metacarpal. He was expected to be out at least three months. On March 5, 2020, Curry returned against the Toronto Raptors and recorded 23 points, six rebounds and seven assists in a 121–113 Warriors' loss.

On December 27, 2020, Curry put up 36 points in a 129–128 win over the Chicago Bulls, becoming the fastest player in NBA history to reach 2,500 career three-pointers. On January 3, 2021, Curry scored a career-high 62 points on 18-of-31 shooting in a 137–122 win against the Portland Trail Blazers. On January 4, he was named the Player of the Week for the Western Conference. On January 23, in a game against the Utah Jazz, Curry hit 5 three-pointers, moving his career total up to 2,562, passing Miller to move up to second in the NBA's career three-pointers list, trailing only Allen. At the 2021 All-Star Game, he won his second Three-Point Contest after making his last shot in the final round to edge Mike Conley Jr. 28–27. On March 15, against the Los Angeles Lakers, Curry passed Guy Rodgers (4,855) as the franchise's leader in career assists.

On April 12, Curry scored 53 points in a 116–107 win against the Denver Nuggets, and he surpassed Wilt Chamberlain (17,783) to become the franchise's all-time scoring leader. It was part of an 11-game stretch in April in which Curry scored at least 30 points in each game, surpassing Kobe Bryant's previous record (10) for a player age 33 or older. He also made 78 three-pointers during that span, the most in NBA history over 11 regular season games. Curry's play sparked media discussions about his candidacy for the league MVP award, and went on to become a finalist for the award for the third time in his career. He was named the Western Conference Player of the Month for April after averaging 37.3 points on .518 shooting and scoring 30 or more points in 13 of his 15 games played. He became the first NBA player to average at least 35 points per game and shoot 50–45–90 in a calendar month and set an NBA record for made three-pointers in a month with 96, breaking James Harden's mark of 82 set in November 2019. Curry made .466 of his three-pointers in that span, including four games in which he made 10 or more three-pointers. He scored 46 points in the regular-season finale against the Memphis Grizzlies, finishing the season with a scoring average of 32.0 and holding off Bradley Beal to secure his second scoring title. He joined Kareem Abdul-Jabbar, Michael Jordan, and Wilt Chamberlain as the fourth player in NBA history to win multiple championships, league MVP awards, and scoring titles in a career.

==== All-time 3-point scoring record, fourth championship and Finals MVP (2021–2022) ====
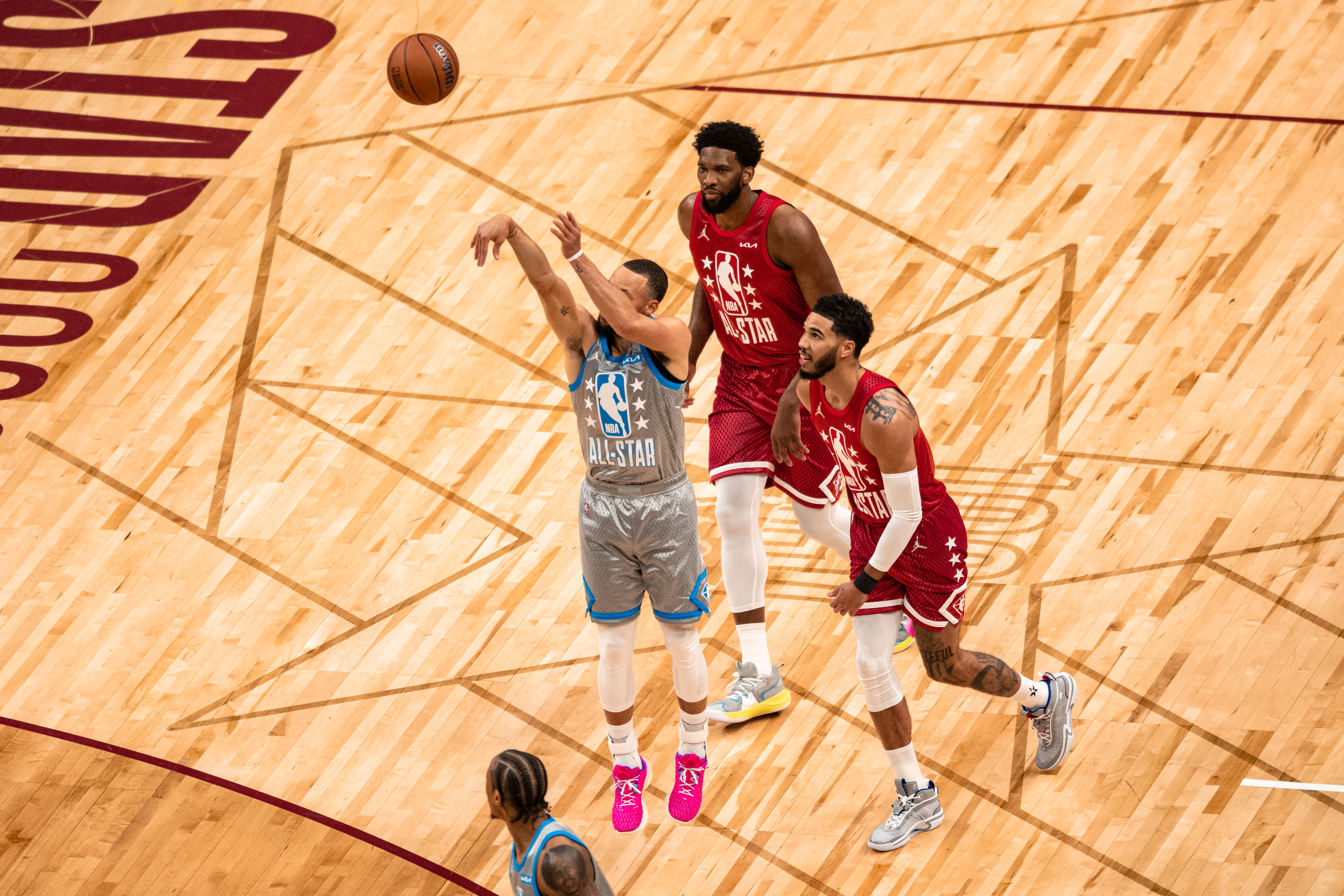
Curry attempting a 3-pointer during the 2022 NBA All-Star Game.

On August 6, 2021, Curry signed a four-year, $215 million extension which would keep him under contract through the 2025–26 season and made him the first player to earn $50 million in a single season as well the first to sign multiple contracts of over $200 million.

On October 19, in the Warriors' season-opener, Curry recorded his eighth career triple-double with 21 points, 10 rebounds, and 10 assists in a 121–114 win against the Los Angeles Lakers. On November 8, Curry scored 50 points, with 10 assists on nine three-pointers made, in a 127–113 win over the Atlanta Hawks. Curry recorded 50 points and 10 assists in the same game for the first time in his career and surpassed Chamberlain as the oldest player in history to achieve this feat. On November 12 against the Chicago Bulls, Curry became the NBA's career leader for three-pointers in both regular season and playoffs with 3,366, passing Ray Allen (3,358). On December 14 at Madison Square Garden against the New York Knicks, Curry made his 2,974th career three-pointer to pass Ray Allen and become the NBA's all-time three-point scoring leader. On January 21, 2022, Curry hit his first career buzzer-beating game-winner in a 105–103 win over the Houston Rockets, on a night where he put up 22 points and 12 assists. On January 31, Curry scored 40 points, 21 of which in the fourth quarter, behind seven three-pointers and dished out nine assists to lead Golden State to a 122–108 victory over the Houston Rockets. His 21 fourth-quarter points were the highest of his career until February 2024.

In the 2022 NBA All-Star Game held on February 20, Curry's Team LeBron defeated Team Durant 163–160. Curry scored 50 points (just 2 points shy of the All-Star Game record set by Anthony Davis in 2017); he also set the record for most three-pointers made in an All-Star quarter (6), half (8), and game (16), and was named the All-Star Game MVP. On February 24, Curry had a season-high 14 assists with 18 points in a 132–95 blowout win over the Portland Trail Blazers. On March 10, Curry scored 34 points in a 113–102 win over the Denver Nuggets. He became the 49th player in NBA history to rack up 20,000 points. On March 14, his 34th birthday, Curry scored 47 points in a 126–112 win over the Washington Wizards. On March 16, in a 110–88 loss to the Boston Celtics, Curry suffered a sprained ligament in his left foot after having it rolled over by a diving Marcus Smart and was ruled out indefinitely. On April 1, he was ruled out for the remainder of the regular season.

On May 9, in Game 4 of the Western Conference semifinals against the Memphis Grizzlies, Curry became the first player in NBA history to make 500 career playoff three-pointers. During the Western Conference finals against the Dallas Mavericks, he averaged 23.8 points, 6.6 rebounds and 7.4 assists per game. After the Warriors won the series in five games, Curry was named the unanimous and inaugural winner of the Western Conference finals MVP award. On June 10, in Game 4 of the NBA Finals, Curry logged 43 points, 10 rebounds, and four assists in a 107–97 victory over the Boston Celtics to even the series at 2–2. He became the first player in Finals history to make 5+ three-pointers in four consecutive games. Curry (at age 34 years, 88 days) also became the second-oldest player in NBA Finals history to record a 40-point, 10-rebound game behind only LeBron James in 2020 (at age 35 years, 284 days). In Game 5 of the Finals, Curry passed Boston Celtics legend John Havlicek for 10th on the all-time Finals assists list. In Game 6 of the Finals, Curry scored 34 points along with seven rebounds, seven assists, and led the Warriors to a 103–90 victory over the Celtics. He was named the Finals MVP unanimously after averaging 31.2 points, 6.0 rebounds, 5.0 assists, and 2.0 steals per game. He became the first player in Finals history to average at least 30 points, 5 rebounds, 5 assists, and 5 made three-pointers per game in a series.

==== Back-to-back chase (2022–2023) ====
On November 2, 2022, Curry logged his 10th career triple-double with 23 points, 13 rebounds and 13 assists in a 116–109 loss against the Miami Heat. On November 7, Curry recorded 47 points, eight rebounds, eight assists, and zero turnovers as the Golden State Warriors beat the Sacramento Kings 116–113 to snap a five-game losing streak. On November 11, Curry scored 40 points on 15–23 shooting from the field in a 106–101 win over the Cleveland Cavaliers. He became the first player in NBA history to record at least 40 points, 5 made three-pointers, and shoot over .650 from the field in consecutive games. On November 20, Curry posted a season-high 15 assists along with 33 points on 7-of-14 shooting from three-point range in a 127–120 win over the Houston Rockets. Curry, Klay Thompson, and Andrew Wiggins combined for 23 made three-pointers, the most three-pointers made in a game by a trio in NBA history. On December 10, in a rematch of the 2022 NBA Finals, Curry recorded 32 points, six rebounds, and seven assists in a 123–107 win over the Boston Celtics.

On January 25, 2023, in a 122–120 victory against the Memphis Grizzlies, Curry was ejected with 1:14 remaining in the fourth quarter for throwing a mouthpiece on the ground, marking the third time that Curry was ejected during his career. Curry left the game with a game-high 34 points. The next day, Curry was named a Western Conference starter for the 2023 NBA All-Star Game, marking his ninth overall selection. On January 30, Curry put up 38 points on 12-of-20 shooting from the field, alongside eight rebounds and 12 assists in a 128–120 win over the Oklahoma City Thunder. He also surpassed Wilt Chamberlain (7,216) for the most field goals made in Warriors franchise history with 7,222. On March 15, Curry scored 50 points on 8-of-14 shooting from three-point range in a 134–126 loss to the Los Angeles Clippers. He became the first player in NBA history to score at least 10,000 career points off of three-pointers. Curry also surpassed Michael Jordan for the most 50-point games at age 30 or older, tying Chamberlain's then-record of 7 games.

In Game 7 of the Warriors' first round playoff series against the Sacramento Kings, Curry scored a playoff career-high 50 points in a 120–100 win. He became the first player to score 50 points in a Game 7 and tied Karl Malone for the most points in a playoff game at age 35 or older. He also became the first player in playoff history to score at least 20 points from behind the arc and in the paint in the same game. Following the series' completion, Curry joined Jordan as the only players in playoff history to record at least 200 points in a series at age 35 or older. In Game 4 of the Western Conference semifinals against the Lakers, Curry logged his third postseason career triple-double with 31 points, 10 rebounds, 14 assists, and three steals in a 104–101 loss. The Warriors were eliminated in six games, despite Curry's 32-point outing in a 122–101 closeout loss in Game 6.

==== Clutch Player of the Year (2023–2024) ====
Following the retirement of Udonis Haslem of the Miami Heat, Curry became the longest tenured NBA player with their current team. On November 1, 2023, Curry became the first player in NBA history to make a three-pointer in 250 consecutive regular season games. On November 3, he scored a game-winning layup in a 141–139 win against the Oklahoma City Thunder. On December 16, Curry scored 37 points on 14-of-22 shooting, including 6-of-8 from beyond the arc in a 124–120 victory over the Brooklyn Nets, becoming the first player in NBA history to eclipse 3,500 career three-pointers.

On January 27, 2024, Curry recorded 46 points and nine made three-pointers, in a 145–144 double-overtime loss to the Los Angeles Lakers. On February 1, Curry was named to his tenth All-Star Game and his first as a reserve. On February 3, Curry scored a season-high 60 points on 22-of-38 shooting from the field with 10 three-pointers made in a 141–134 overtime loss to the Atlanta Hawks, setting several NBA records; he joined Kobe Bryant as the only players in history to record a 60-point game at age 35 or older; he became the second player after Rick Barry to score at least 60 points with at most six free throws attempted; he joined Damian Lillard and Karl-Anthony Towns as the only players to record at least 60 points and 10 made three-pointers in a regular season game; he became the first player in history to average over 40 points per game on 50–40–100 splits in a four-game span. He also surpassed Wilt Chamberlain for the most 50-point games by a player age 30 or older (8). On February 8, Curry scored 42 points on 15-of-22 shooting from the field, including a season-high 11-of-16 shooting from three, in a 131–109 win over the Indiana Pacers. On February 10, Curry recorded 30 points, nine rebounds, six assists, and 9-of-16 shooting from beyond the arc, including a game-winning three-pointer, in a 113–112 win over the Phoenix Suns.

On April 25, Curry was named the NBA Clutch Player of the Year after leading the league in clutch points (189), made field goals (59), and made three-pointers (32) during the regular season.

==== Second All-Star Game MVP and 4K 3-point club (2024–2025) ====
On August 30, 2024, Curry signed a one-year, $62.6 million contract extension with the Warriors throughout the 2026–27 season, becoming the first NBA player to earn $60 million in a single season. He also joined LeBron James and Kevin Durant as the only players in history to amass $500 million in career earnings.

On November 11, Curry dropped 36 points and seven assists in a 127–116 road victory over the Oklahoma City Thunder. Two days later, he recorded 37 points, nine assists, six rebounds, and the Warriors' final 12 points to secure a 120–117 win over the Dallas Mavericks. The game marked Klay Thompson's first return to the Bay Area after leaving for Dallas in a sign-and-trade during the off-season. On December 25, 2024, Curry dropped 38 points and six assists in a 115–113 loss to the Los Angeles Lakers. He shot 8-of-15 from three-point range, tying a Christmas day game record for the most in history. On January 2, 2025, Curry dropped 30 points, 10 assists, and a career-first 8-of-8 shooting from beyond the arc in a 139–105 win over the Philadelphia 76ers, becoming the first player in NBA history to achieve this stat line. He also surpassed Michael Jordan for the most 30-point games by a guard at age 35 or older. On January 25, Curry was named a Western Conference starter for the 2025 NBA All-Star Game, marking his eleventh overall selection and his tenth selection as a starter.

On February 8, Curry recorded 34 points, six assists, and eight made three-pointers in a 132–111 road win over the Chicago Bulls. He scored 24 points in the third quarter, marking his 41st career 20-point quarter—the most by any player since the NBA began tracking play-by-play data in 1997–98. Two days later, in his 1,000th regular season game, Curry tied his season-high of 38 points and grabbed six rebounds in a 125–111 road win over the Milwaukee Bucks. He joined LeBron James, Michael Jordan, and Karl Malone as the only players in history to record four consecutive 30-point games at age 36 or older. On February 16, Curry won his second All-Star MVP award after scoring 20 points and six three-pointers combined in the two games of the exhibition's revamped mini-tournament format. He joined LeBron James, Magic Johnson, and Michael Jordan as the only players in history to win at least two league MVP awards, two All-Star MVP awards, and a Finals MVP award in a career. On February 27, Curry put up 56 points on 16-of-25 shooting, including 12 made three-pointers, in a 121–115 road win over the Orlando Magic. He outscored the Magic 22–21 in the third quarter and notched his third 50-point game after turning 35 years old, the most in NBA history. He also tied Thompson's then-record for the most career games (3) with at least 12 made three-pointers.

On March 6, Curry recorded 40 points and seven made three-pointers, including a fadeaway buzzer-beater from the half court logo, in a 121–119 road win over the Brooklyn Nets. Two days later, he scored 32 points in a 115–110 win over the Detroit Pistons and eclipsed 25,000 career points, becoming the 26th player in NBA history to do so. On March 13, Curry eclipsed 4,000 career three-pointers in a 130–104 win over the Sacramento Kings, becoming the first player in NBA history to start the 4K club. On April 1, Curry put up 52 points, 10 rebounds, eight assists, five steals, and 12 made three-pointers in a 134–125 road win over the Memphis Grizzlies. He became the first player in NBA history to register at least 50 points, 10 made three-pointers, and five steals in a single game and passed Jerry West on the all-time scoring list. On April 3, Curry recorded 37 points and six assists in a 123–116 road win over the Los Angeles Lakers. The next day, he scored 36 points, five assists, and seven made three-pointers in a 118–104 win over the Denver Nuggets, securing the Warriors' first victory over the Nuggets since March 2022. On April 13, Curry recorded 36 points, six assists, and seven made three-pointers in a 124–119 overtime loss to the Los Angeles Clippers in the regular-season finale. He finished the season as the league leader in free throw percentage for the fifth time in his career, tying Reggie Miller for the third-most in NBA history. On April 29, Curry was named the Twyman–Stokes Teammate of the Year for his commitment to team excellence and leadership as a mentor to other NBA players.

In Game 3 of the Warriors' first round playoff series against the Houston Rockets, Curry recorded 36 points, nine assists, and seven rebounds in a 104–93 win and passed Tony Parker for 10th on the NBA's all-time playoff scoring list. In Game 7 of the first round, Curry scored 22 points, along with a team-leading 10 rebounds, seven assists, two steals, and two blocks, to help the Warriors eliminate the Rockets with a 103–89 road win and advance to the Western Conference semifinals. In Game 1 of the conference semifinals against the Minnesota Timberwolves, Curry suffered a strained hamstring in the second quarter and was sidelined for the rest of the game, which the Warriors went on to win—their only victory in the series. In his absence, the Warriors were eliminated in five games.

==== Scoring milestones and records (2025–present) ====
On November 12, 2025, Curry scored 46 points in a 125–120 win over the San Antonio Spurs, leading the Warriors to a 16-point comeback victory. Two nights later, on November 14, Curry recorded a season-high 49 points, making nine three-pointers and converting the game-winning free throws with 6.4 seconds remaining in a 109–108 win, also against the Spurs. The two performances combined for 95 points, the highest two-game scoring total of his career. With the achievement, Curry joined Michael Jordan as the only players age 37 or older in NBA history to record consecutive 45-point games, and he tied Jordan for the most 40-point games after turning 30 (44). On December 12, Curry recorded 39 points, five rebounds, and five assists in a 127–120 loss to the Minnesota Timberwolves. He surpassed Michael Jordan for the most 35-point games in NBA history after his 30th birthday (94). On December 14, Curry scored 48 points and a season-high 12 three-pointers in a 136–131 loss to the Portland Trail Blazers. It marked his 45th career game with 40 or more points after turning 30, surpassing Michael Jordan (44) for the most such games in NBA history. On December 25, Curry scored 23 points and hit a key late three-pointer to lead the Warriors to a 126–116 win over the Dallas Mavericks, becoming the 22nd player in NBA history to reach 26,000 career points.

Despite Curry's individual achievements, the Warriors were hampered by injuries during the season. Curry missed extended time because of a knee injury, and teammate Jimmy Butler was lost for the season after tearing his ACL in January. Golden State finished 37–45 and was eliminated in the NBA Play-In Tournament, failing to qualify for the playoffs.

On September 25, 2026, Curry signed a two-year contract extension with the Warriors for $116 million, keeping him under contract through the 2028–29 season (with a player option for that season).

On October 28, 2026, Curry recorded 44 points, eight rebounds, six assists, and two steals in a 119–114 victory over the Minnesota Timberwolves. In doing so, he tied LeBron James for the most 40-point games in NBA history by a player aged 35 or older, with 15 each. On November 7, Curry scored 41 points, grabbed six rebounds, and dished out six assists in a 126–119 overtime win over the Orlando Magic, becoming the NBA’s all-time leader in 40-point games after turning 35, with 16, surpassing LeBron James.

== National team career ==
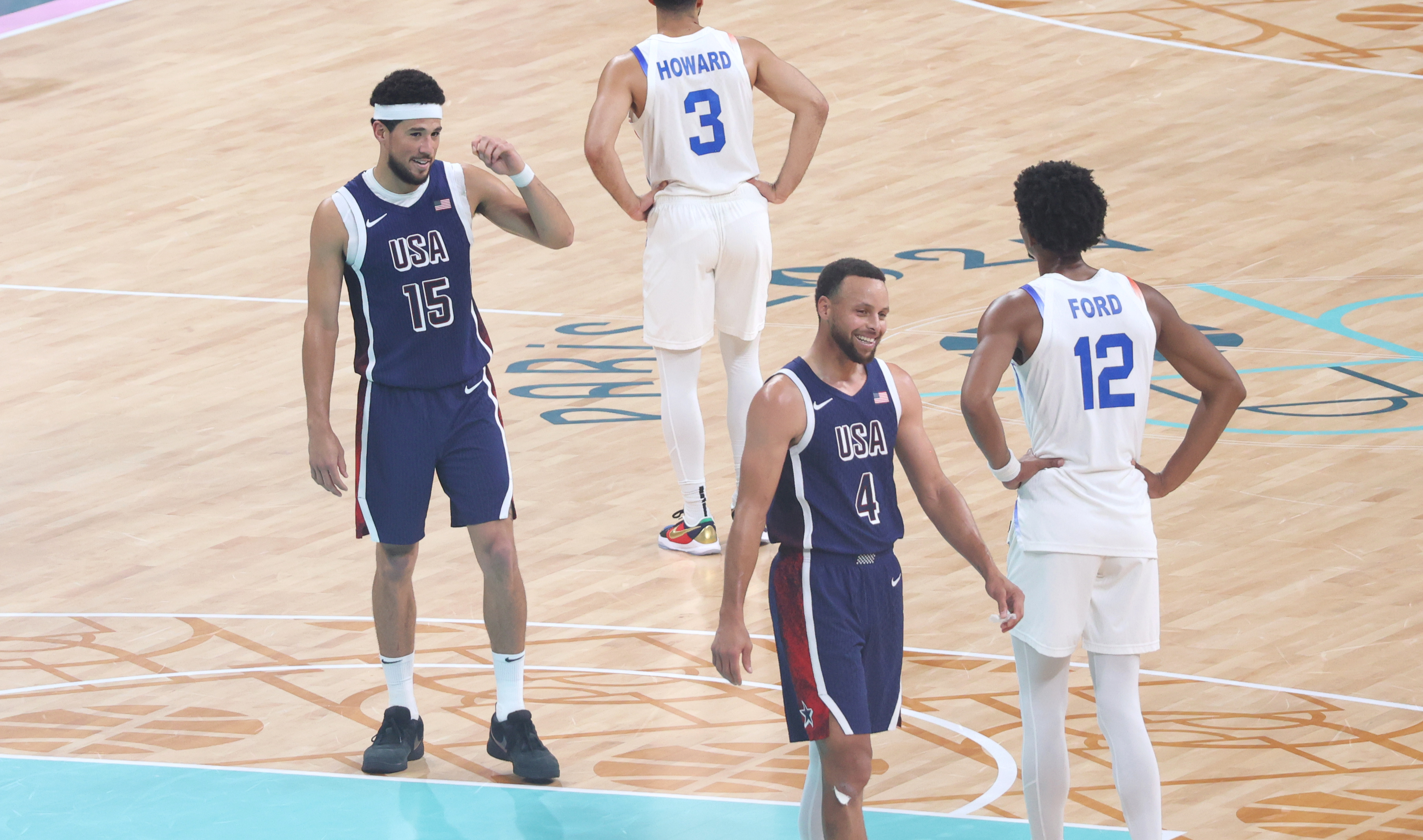
Curry (foreground) alongside teammate Devin Booker at the 2024 Summer Olympics in Paris.

Curry's first experience with the United States national team came at the 2007 FIBA Under-19 World Championship, where he helped Team USA capture the silver medal. He averaged 9.4 points, 3.8 rebounds, 2.2 assists and 2.8 steals per game.

In 2010, Curry was selected to the senior squad, playing limited minutes at the 2010 FIBA World Championship (later known as the FIBA Basketball World Cup) as the United States won the gold medal in an undefeated tournament. In 2012, Curry was excluded from the list of 20 finalists selected for consideration for the 2012 U.S. Olympic team in London, which reportedly left him "very disappointed" but motivated to improve his game for future opportunities. In 2014, he took on a larger role with the team, helping them to another undefeated tournament at the 2014 World Cup and scoring 10 points in the final game. On June 6, 2016, Curry withdrew from consideration for the 2016 Summer Olympics in Rio de Janeiro, citing ankle and knee ailments as the major reason behind the decision.

Curry made his Olympic debut with the 2024 U.S. Olympic team in Paris, alongside his longtime head coach Steve Kerr. He initially struggled from the field. In a tightly contested semifinal game against Serbia, Curry led a 17-point comeback in a 95–91 win, finishing with a tournament-high 36 points, eight rebounds, and 9-of-14 shooting from three-point range. In the final two minutes, Curry made a successful steal, layup, and two clutch free throws to maintain a lead of four points. His 36 points are the second-most ever scored in a game by an American, behind Carmelo Anthony's 37-point performance against Nigeria in 2012. He also set an Olympic record for most three-pointers made in a knockout game. In a post-game interview, teammate Kevin Durant called Curry's performance "one of the greatest games I've ever seen him play". Curry followed up his performance with another successful outing in the final game against France, tallying 24 points, five assists, and 8-of-12 shooting from three-point range. He made four consecutive three-pointers in the final three minutes, including a double-contested fadeaway jump shot, to secure the United States' fifth-straight Olympic gold medal and his career-first. Curry's final game-clinching three-pointer, dubbed the "Golden Dagger", was named one of the greatest moments in Olympic basketball history. He finished the tournament as the team's leading scorer, averaging 14.8 points per game, and set an Olympic record for most three-pointers made in a final. For his performances, Curry was selected to the Olympics All-Star Five team and named the 2024 USA Basketball 5-on-5 Male Athlete of the Year. He joined LeBron James, Magic Johnson, and Michael Jordan as the fourth player in NBA history to win at least four championships, two league MVP awards, a Finals MVP award, and an Olympic gold medal in a career.

== Player profile ==
Listed at 6 feet 2 inches (1.88 m) and 185 pounds (86 kg), Curry plays almost exclusively at the point guard position combined with the signature play style of an elite shooting guard. He has career averages of 24.8 points, 6.3 assists, 4.7 rebounds, and 1.5 steals per game (through the end of the 2025–26 season), His career free throw percentage of .912 is the highest in NBA history, and he has led the league in annual free-throw percentage five times. He has been named league MVP twice, including the first unanimous selection in league history (2015–16).

Known for his three-point shooting, athleticism, and play-making, Curry is an offensive threat from underneath the rim to near half-court. Using an unorthodox jump shot, he is capable of releasing the ball in under half a second upon jumping, adding greater arc to his shots and making them difficult to block. Therefore, Curry is able to adjust his release and balance to make shots from virtually anywhere on the court. For his high shooting proficiency and ball-handling, he has been referred to as the "Baby-Faced Assassin" since a young age and "Chef Curry" while playing in the NBA. For their shooting abilities, Curry and former teammate Klay Thompson are often referred to as the Splash Brothers. In the 2013–14 season, they set the record for combined three-pointers made in a season with 484, a record they broke the following season (525), and again in the 2015–16 season (678). Curry is also known for putting pressure on defenses with his long range and led the league in field goals made from beyond 28 feet in the 2015–16 season. A clutch scorer, he often shoots at his best in high-pressure moments and takes game-winning shots. Curry has made 10 game-winning shots (Note: Shots made in the last five seconds of the fourth quarter and/or overtime.) in his career, the most by any player since the 2012–13 season. He was named the 2023–24 NBA Clutch Player of the Year after leading the league in clutch points, made clutch field goals, and made clutch three-pointers.

His career three-point field goal percentage (3P%) of .422 ranks as the 14th highest in NBA history. In 2015–16, Curry posted the highest eFG% (.630) and 3P% (.454) ever recorded in a season while averaging over 30 points per game. He holds four of the top-five seasons with most three-pointers made, led by his NBA record 402 three-pointers from the 2015–16 season, and has served as the annual leader a record eight times. He is also the fastest player in league history to make 2,000 career three-pointers, doing so in 227 fewer games than the previous record-holder, Ray Allen. Additionally, Curry is the fastest player to make 100 three-pointers in a season, doing so in just 19 games, breaking his own previous record of 20 games.

Owing to his offensive presence, Curry's scoring creates a "gravity" effect that forces opposing defenders to frequently double-team him during both on-ball and off-ball movement, creating mismatches that his teammates exploit. With Curry, the Warriors average 10.8 isolations per game; without Curry, they average 15.3 isolations per game. His absence slows the Warriors offense and leads to less passing and ball movement. With Curry, the Warriors average 1.05 points every shot that comes after an off-ball screen; without Curry, it drops to 0.95 points per game. His absence makes it much easier for defenders to switch on screens. Of Curry's success with or without other elite teammates, NBC Sports' Tom Haberstroh said, "You can pluck All-Star after All-Star off the court like flower petals, and the Steph-led Warriors will still dominate like a champion. He's that transcendent of a player."

Curry's short stature relative to the rest of the league impeded his defensive abilities for the majority of his career. Some analysts, including Ethan Sherwood Strauss of ESPN, have complimented his defensive play or called it underrated. Strauss said in 2015 that Curry became "one of the NBA's most effective defenders – ranking fifth among point guards in defensive real plus-minus." Curry led the league in total steals in the 2014–15 season and steals per game in the following season.

== Legacy ==
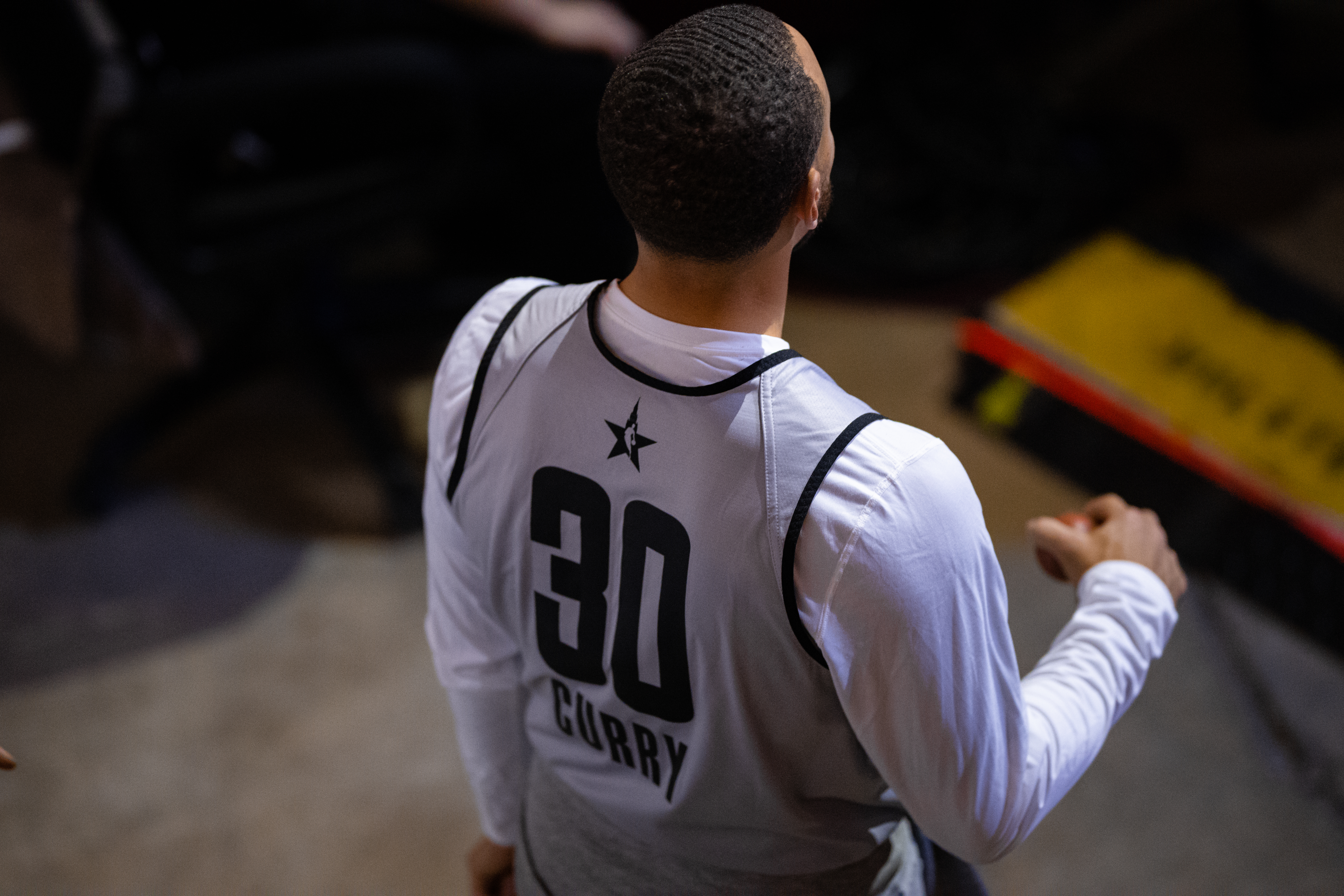
Curry in February 2022

Curry is widely considered the greatest shooter and one of the greatest players in NBA history. He is credited with revolutionizing the game of basketball by inspiring teams, from high school to the NBA, to regularly use the three-point shot. Analysts have referred to him as "the Michael Jordan of the three-point era", saying that he did for the three-point shot what Jordan did for the slam dunk. The Guardian's Robert O'Connell cites Curry's February 27, 2013, game against the New York Knicks, in which he made 11-of-13 shots from behind the arc en route to a 54-point performance, as the start of the three-point era. The era has been referred to as "the Steph Effect" or "the NBA's Three-Point Revolution". Curry is also often compared to Magic Johnson in debates over the greatest point guard of all time, owing to their generational impact, winningness, and diverse skill-sets.

Regarded as the face of the Warriors dynasty, Curry helped redefine three-point scoring as a central element of modern-day basketball strategy rather than a mere novelty. His influence has inspired the league to transition from physical play around the basket to a "pace and space" approach that emphasizes three-point shooting. This transformation can be attributed, in part, to teams attempting to counter the Warriors' dominance and young players aspiring to emulate Curry's range. Curry regularly attempts shots from 30 to 35 feet at an efficiency of 54 percent compared to the league average of under 22 percent from this range and 35 percent for made three-pointers overall. As Curry himself noted, "I'm sure coaches tell their high school players that shooting the way I do takes work and time;" Jesse Dougherty of The Washington Post stated that "coaches have to explain that while Curry's skill set is something to aspire to, his game is built on fundamentals." His ability to make these shots is complemented by a high degree of ball-handling skills, release, and capacity to shoot effectively with one or more defenders contesting his attempts. Sally Jenkins, also of The Washington Post, highlighted the degree of difficulty of Curry's shooting, citing a period in which he achieved a 67 percent success rate on shots taken from 28 to 50 feet. Jeff Austin of Octagon noted that Curry "had to develop tremendous strength in his wrists to shoot and maintain that form from 40 and 50 feet." Goldsberry concludes that "no player in the history of the NBA has combined range, volume, and efficiency from downtown as well as Curry," making him "the most efficient volume scorer on the planet." The developers of the NBA 2K video game series have even expressed concerns about accurately replicating Curry's unique abilities.

Where Curry ranks as one of the greatest NBA players has been more subject to debate. Scottie Pippen, a six-time NBA champion with the Chicago Bulls, said that Curry's "willingness to sacrifice" for Durant is "one of the great stories in history." Crediting Curry as "one of the greatest guards the game has ever seen", he said: "If you have a mind for the game, you know that it takes sacrifice to be great. All the greats have to sacrifice something. Otherwise you can't win." In a 2019 feature, Sports Illustrated stated that "Curry and the Warriors are a great match of player and system" and that "the entire ecosystem is predicated on the idea that a player doesn't need to dominate the ball to dominate a game. Curry took that noble idea and elevated it beyond any reasonable expectation." In October 2021, Curry was honored as one of the league's greatest players of all time as a member of the NBA 75th Anniversary Team. After winning his fourth NBA championship and first Finals MVP award in 2022, Complex ranked Curry as the 10th greatest player in NBA history the following year. Angel Diaz of Complex cited his generational impact with "nothing left (for Curry) to accomplish" as reasons for his place among the sport's greats.

== Off the court ==
=== Personal life ===
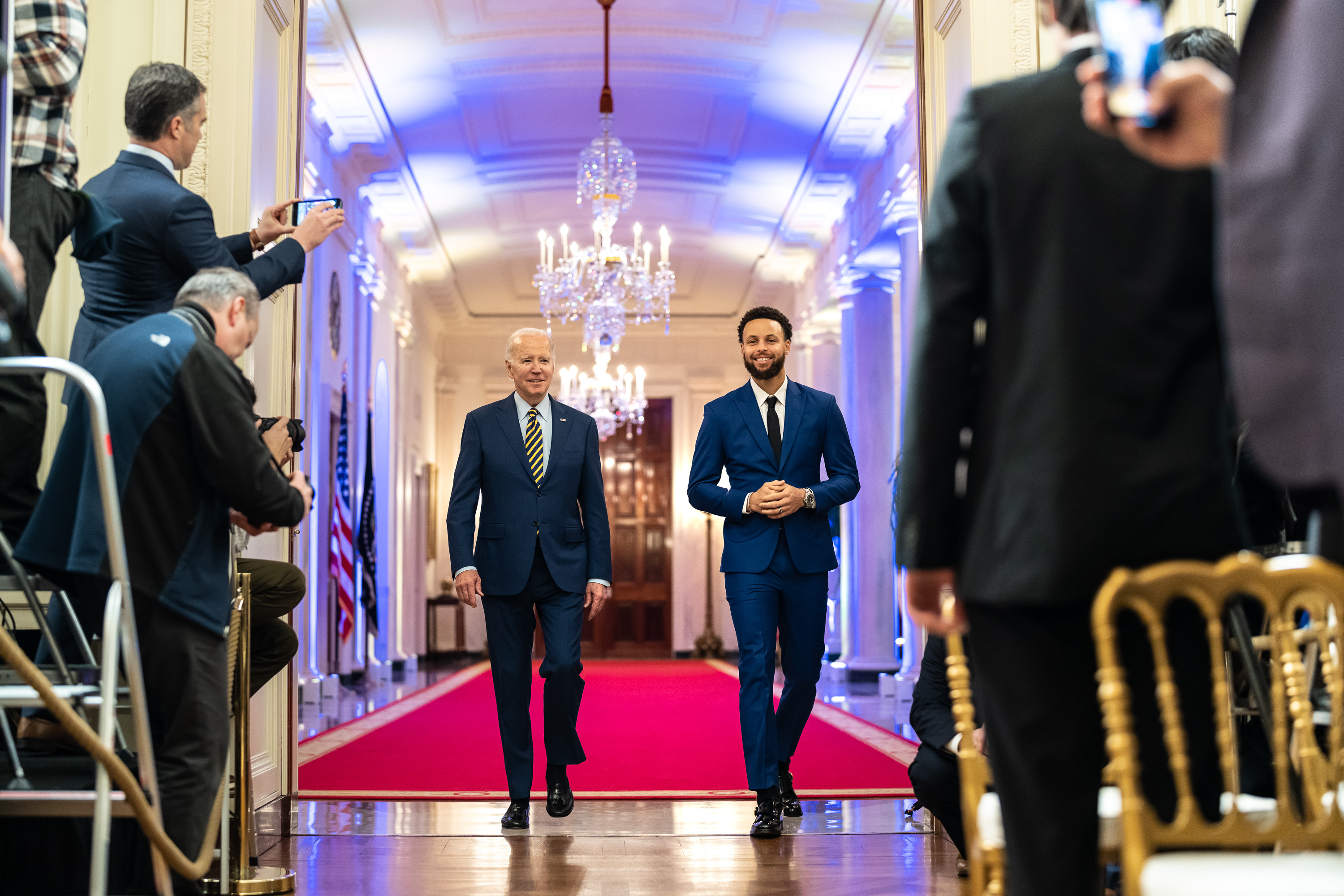
Curry walking alongside US President Joe Biden to the East Room of the White House in 2023. Curry supported Biden in the 2020 United States presidential election.

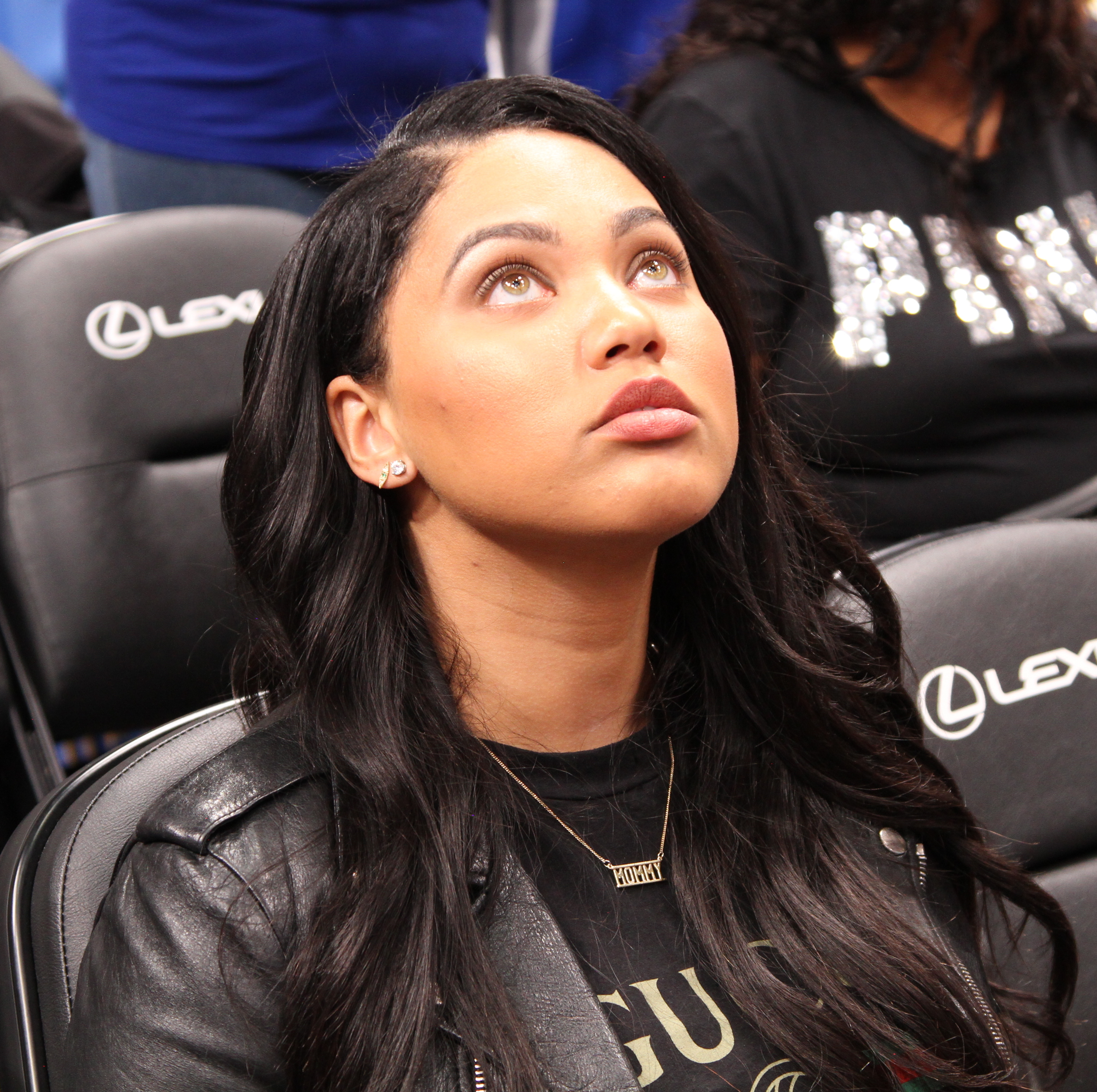
Ayesha Curry watches her husband Stephen Curry practicing prior to the start of a game in Denver in 2017

On July 30, 2011, Curry married his Canadian longtime girlfriend Ayesha Alexander in Charlotte. They met at their church in Charlotte when he was 15 and she was 14. They have two daughters (born July 2012 and July 2015) and two sons (born July 2018 and May 2024). In July 2019, Curry bought a $31 million home in Atherton, California.

Curry suffers from keratoconus and wears contact lenses to correct his vision. His younger brother Seth is also a professional basketball player, and his younger sister Sydel played volleyball at Elon University. His mother Sonya is the godmother of basketball player Cameron Brink, being close friends and former college roommates with Brink's mother during their time at Virginia Tech.

Curry is a Pentecostal Christian and has been outspoken about his faith. During his MVP speech, he said, "People should know who I represent and why I am who I am, and that's because of my Lord and Savior." He also said the reason that he pounds his chest and points up on the court is that he has a "heart for God" and as a reminder that he plays for God. On some of his Curry One basketball shoes, there is a lace loop scripted "4:13" in reference to the Bible verse Philippians 4:13, which reads: "I can do all things through Christ who strengthens me". He has a tattoo of First Corinthians 13:8 ("love never fails") in Hebrew on his wrist. He is an investor in the Christian sports apparel brand Active Faith.

Curry gave one of the jerseys he wore during the 2015 NBA Finals to Biserka Petrović, the mother of Croatian basketball player Dražen Petrović, who died in a car accident in June 1993; it was reportedly added to the collection of the Dražen Petrović Memorial Center in Zagreb. Biserka had been tasked with babysitting the three-year-old Curry during the 1992 NBA All-Star Game weekend, while his father Dell competed in the Three-Point Contest.

Curry is an avid golfer who started playing at the age of 10 and frequently golfs with former teammate Andre Iguodala. He participates in celebrity golf tournaments and has golfed with U.S. President Barack Obama. In August 2017, he competed in the Ellie Mae Classic on an unrestricted sponsor exemption. Although he missed the first cut, he scored 4-over-74 for both days he participated, surpassing most expectations for an amateur competing in the pro event. In August 2019, Curry and historically black institution Howard University jointly announced that the school would add NCAA Division I teams in men's and women's golf starting in the 2020–21 school year, with Curry guaranteeing full funding of both teams for six years. In July 2023, he won the American Century Championship, an annual celebrity golf tournament held at the Edgewood Tahoe Resort. He shot a hole-in-one during the second round and won the tournament on the final hole with a walk-off eagle putt.

=== Public image ===
"No NBA athlete has a larger contingent of fans at every arena, lining up 20- and 30-deep hoping for a glimpse, if not an autograph. This crazy popularity is why his jersey sales consistently rank No. 1, why he was voted to be the captain of the [2018] Western Conference All-Star team and why 9-year-old girls feel comfortable enough to write letters asking for his help – and actually get it."

— Monte Poole of NBC Sports on Curry's popularity

Curry is one of the most successful players in the NBA, and has also become an international celebrity, on par with four-time MVP LeBron James. Like James, he has been considered the face of the NBA, but has said that he is not motivated by that and is not looking "to take LeBron's throne or whatever. You know, I'm trying to chase rings, and that's all I'm about. So that's where the conversation stops for me." His flashy play and penchant for coming up big in the clutch have made him a fan favorite, and his smaller physique is said to have made his success seem more attainable for younger fans of the NBA. Memorabilia associated with Curry is highly sought after; his 2009 rookie card ranks among the most expensive sports cards of all-time and was, at the time, the most expensive basketball card ever sold, purchased by Alt Fund II for a record $5.9 million in July 2021, later being surpassed by a Michael Jordan and Kobe Bryant card that was sold for $12.9 million in August 2025. Curry has led the NBA in jersey sales for five cumulative years; three consecutive times from the 2015–16 to 2017–18 seasons and two consecutive times from the 2022–23 to 2023–24 seasons, respectively.

ESPN has ranked Curry among the most famous international athletes. He is the highest paid NBA player of all-time by season and has been ranked in Forbes' list of the world's highest-paid celebrities for his endorsements six times. Forbes listed him among the 10 highest-paid athletes in the world every year between 2018 and 2025, and ranked him second in 2025 (estimated income $156 million; only behind Cristiano Ronaldo). He has also been included in every annual ranking of the highest-paid athletes by Sportico since its induction in 2021, and was rated the second highest-paid athlete of 2024 with estimated earnings of $153.8 million.

ESPN's Kirk Goldsberry reasoned that one reason for Curry's popularity is that while most people are not tall enough to dunk, everyone can attempt a shot, which is something Curry inspires. Owen Davis of Sky Sports echoed this sentiment, stating: "After all, not everyone is blessed with supreme height and athleticism, but everyone can learn to pass, dribble and shoot. Curry is proof that if you work hard enough, you can still find ways to dominate, no matter your size." Monte Poole of NBC Sports found Curry to be "the most human of superstars", with a childlike aura to him when he plays with success. His fanbase ranges from very young children to the elderly, and casual or committed fans enjoy his style of play. Poole stated that "the joy factor exponentially increases" when Curry is on the court and that "the sight of this relatively ordinary specimen sending much bigger players into silent surrender is an intoxicant for the Warriors and their fans."

=== Business interests ===
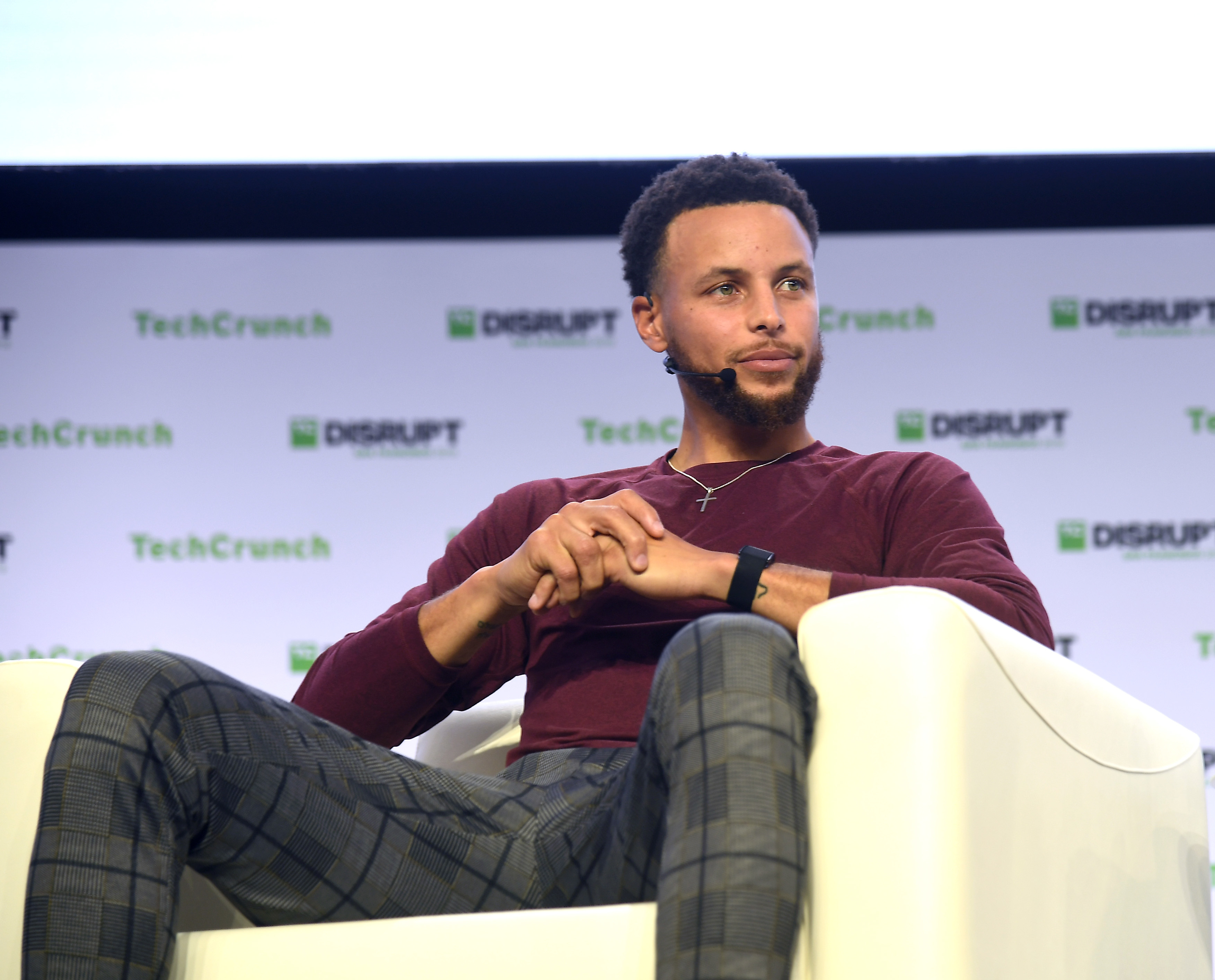
Curry speaking at TechCrunch Disrupt San Francisco 2019

Curry is widely known for his partnership with Under Armour, serving as the "face of their footwear line" and the President of his signature shoe and apparel line called the "Curry Brand". Originally signed to Nike, Curry began a partnership with Under Armour in the 2013 off-season that lasted through late 2025. After becoming the NBA MVP and one of the most popular athletes in the world, sales of Curry's shoe line became an influential factor for the brand, with stock prices pivoting based on its success.

In October 2018, Curry announced his involvement with the relaunch of Palm, a mobile companion device that pairs with a primary smartphone. Curry is an investor and the leading brand ambassador for Palm, a small startup based in San Francisco which licenses the Palm name from TCL Corporation. He is also involved with designing and testing accessories and even helped to name the device.

In 2021, Curry, among other high-profile athletes and celebrities, was a paid spokesperson for FTX, a cryptocurrency exchange. In November 2022, FTX filed for bankruptcy, erasing billions of dollars in customer funds, with Curry, alongside other spokespeople, being sued for promoting unregistered securities through a class-action lawsuit. In February 2022, the U.S. 11th Circuit Court of Appeals ruled in a lawsuit against Bitconnect that the Securities Act of 1933 extends to targeted solicitation using social media.

Since 2018, Curry has served as the chief executive officer of Thirty Ink, a San Francisco-based company that works to provide equitable opportunities to people through brand, media, experiences, and philanthropy, as the four major verticals. Since 2019, Curry has been the Global Brand Ambassador for Rakuten. The company partnered with Curry on a one-day shopping spree at the Warriors Shop in Chase Center for 20 Bay Area children. Curry posed as a team shop employee during the event and helped find sports gear around the store. In August 2025 it was announced that Curry would be opening a bar called The Eighth Rule in San Francisco's Union Square with celebrity chef Michael Mina.

=== Philanthropy ===
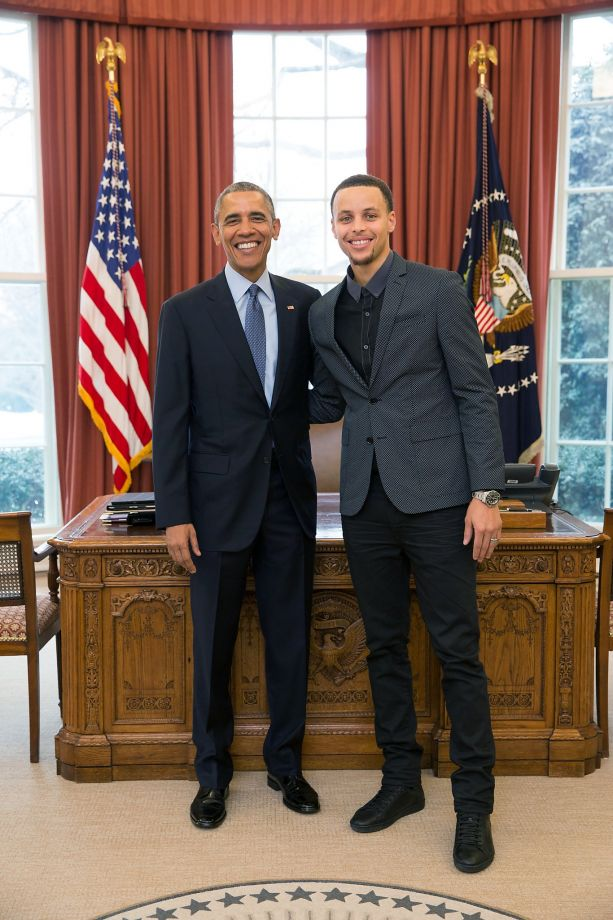
President Barack Obama joined by Curry in 2015 to launch the president's initiative on malaria.

In 2012, Curry started donating three insecticide-treated mosquito nets for every three-pointer he made to the United Nations Foundation's Nothing But Nets campaign to combat malaria. He was first introduced to the malaria cause by Davidson teammate Bryant Barr when they were both in school. Curry visited the White House in 2015 and delivered a five-minute speech to dignitaries as part of President Barack Obama's launch of his President's Malaria Initiative.

In 2015, Curry wore sneakers that bore the name "Deah Shaddy Barakat"—a victim of the 2015 Chapel Hill shooting. According to his sister Suzanne, Deah was known for his "love for basketball and anything Steph Curry." Deah donned Curry's No. 30 as his jersey number for his intramural basketball team at North Carolina State University, and recreated Curry's pose from his GQ photo-shoot. Curry said that Deah's family "did a great job of reaching out to me and making me aware of the details of his life and personality ... It was really kind of a cool deal to be able to use the platform yesterday to honor Deah and his family ... I'm going to send them the shoes I wore yesterday. And hopefully, they know that I've been thinking about them." Following his MVP award win and historic 2015–16 season, Curry donated his prize vehicle—a 2016 Kia Sorento—to the East Oakland Youth Development Center, a local non-profit organization located in the backyard of Oracle Arena.

In December 2018, while on a podcast, Curry jokingly questioned whether the Apollo program's Moon landing actually took place, which received substantial media attention and criticism. NASA went on to offer Curry a tour of the Johnson Space Center and discuss further. He partnered with Under Armour in creating signature shoes inspired by the comment and subsequent discussion. After wearing them to a game, he signed and auctioned them off on eBay. The shoes sold for $58,100 after 113 bids, with the money being donated for STEM education initiatives.

In July 2019, Curry and his wife launched the Eat. Learn. Play. Foundation in Oakland, California. By 2023, the Foundation had provided 25 million meals, renovated 12 play areas and invested $6 million in literacy programs. Since its inception, the foundation has raised and invested over $75 million to narrow the literacy gap in the city's underserved communities, provide access to nutritious meals, and remodel physical education spaces to improve children's well-being. In May 2025, Curry and his wife were named in Time's inaugural list of the most influential people in philanthropy.

=== Filmmaking ===
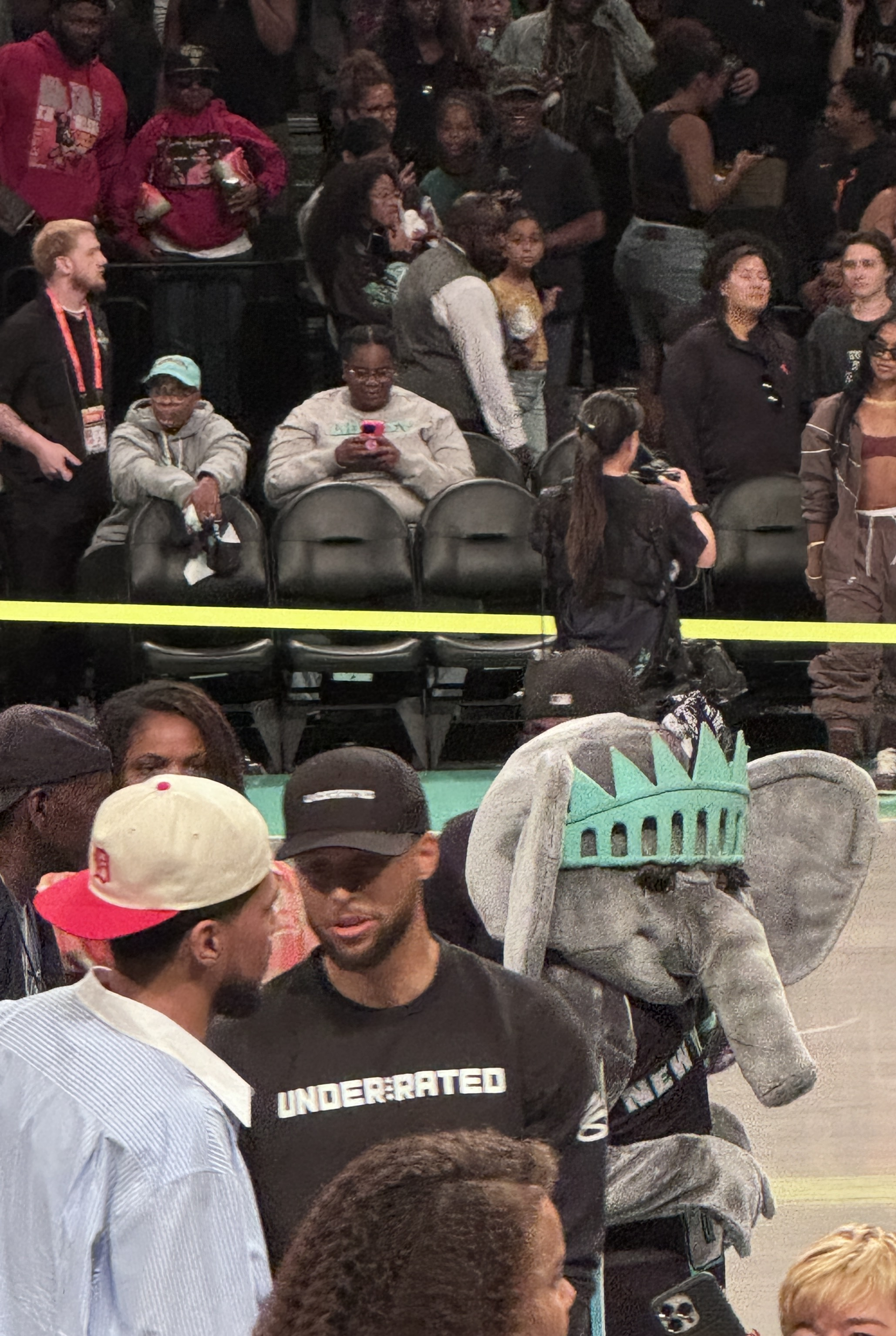
Curry at a New York Liberty vs. Las Vegas Aces WNBA game (speaking to Devin Booker), donning his Underrated-themed merchandise, in 2024

In April 2018, Sony Pictures Entertainment announced a wide-ranging, multiyear multimedia deal with Curry's newly-formed production company Unanimous Media (named for Curry becoming the first NBA player in history to be elected the league's MVP by a unanimous vote), located on the Sony Pictures studio lot in Culver City. The film and TV deal included electronics, gaming, and virtual reality, and is focused on faith and family-friendly content.

In October 2018, Curry signed on as executive producer of the film Breakthrough, scheduled for release in April 2019. Curry was also executive producer of the film Emanuel, scheduled for US theatrical release in select theaters on June 17, 2019. The film focused on the responses by family members of victims of the 2015 Charleston church shooting. Curry remarked, "In the face of adversity, in the face of tragedy, how can I get through it?"

Beginning in 2019, Curry became both the executive producer and resident golf pro on the American sports reality competition television series Holey Moley. On June 24, 2020, Curry released a trailer for his new show on his YouTube channel called Ultimate Home Championships, a show featuring people such as DeAndre Jordan, Ronda Rousey, and Kristopher London, where contestants competed in wacky at-home challenges using things in their home. In 2020, Unanimous Media signed a deal with Amazon's Audible. The same year, Curry served as the executive producer of an animated revival of the 1970s sitcom Good Times along with the series' original executive producer, Norman Lear, and Family Guy creator Seth MacFarlane. The series was green-lit by Netflix in 2020.

In 2021, Curry signed on as executive producer of The Queen of Basketball, a documentary short film about basketball legend Lusia Harris. The same year, Unanimous Media signed a deal with NBCUniversal. In 2023, Unanimous Media and Ryan Coogler co-produced Stephen Curry: Underrated, a sports documentary film chronicling Curry's path to NBA stardom. Apple TV+ secured the streaming rights and a release date of July 21, 2023.

In 2026, he was producer of and narrator on Sentenced, a documentary film about literacy in the U.S. It had its premiere on March 11, 2026, at the IMAX Theatre at the Indiana State Museum, supported by Indy Reads, Indiana Sports Corp, and the Children's Literacy Project.

=== Political views ===
In September 2017, Warriors team captain Curry together with other Warriors members boycotted their invitation to meet US President Donald Trump at the White House after winning the 2017 NBA Finals. In June 2018, President Trump said that he will not welcome the Warriors at the White House in case they win the 2018 NBA Finals because 'If they don't want to be here, I don't want them'. Curry and his wife supported Democratic candidate Joe Biden during the 2020 presidential election and endorsed Biden at that year's Democratic National Convention. In December 2021, Curry spoke out in favor of the For the People Act, an election reform bill aimed at expanding voting rights. In 2023, he opposed the development of multi-family housing in the wealthy enclave of Atherton, California, where he and his family live, citing safety and privacy for themselves and their children as the development would have been directly behind his home. He endorsed Democratic candidate Kamala Harris during the 2024 presidential election. Curry described Trump's 2024 White House bid as a "serious threat".

== Awards and honors ==
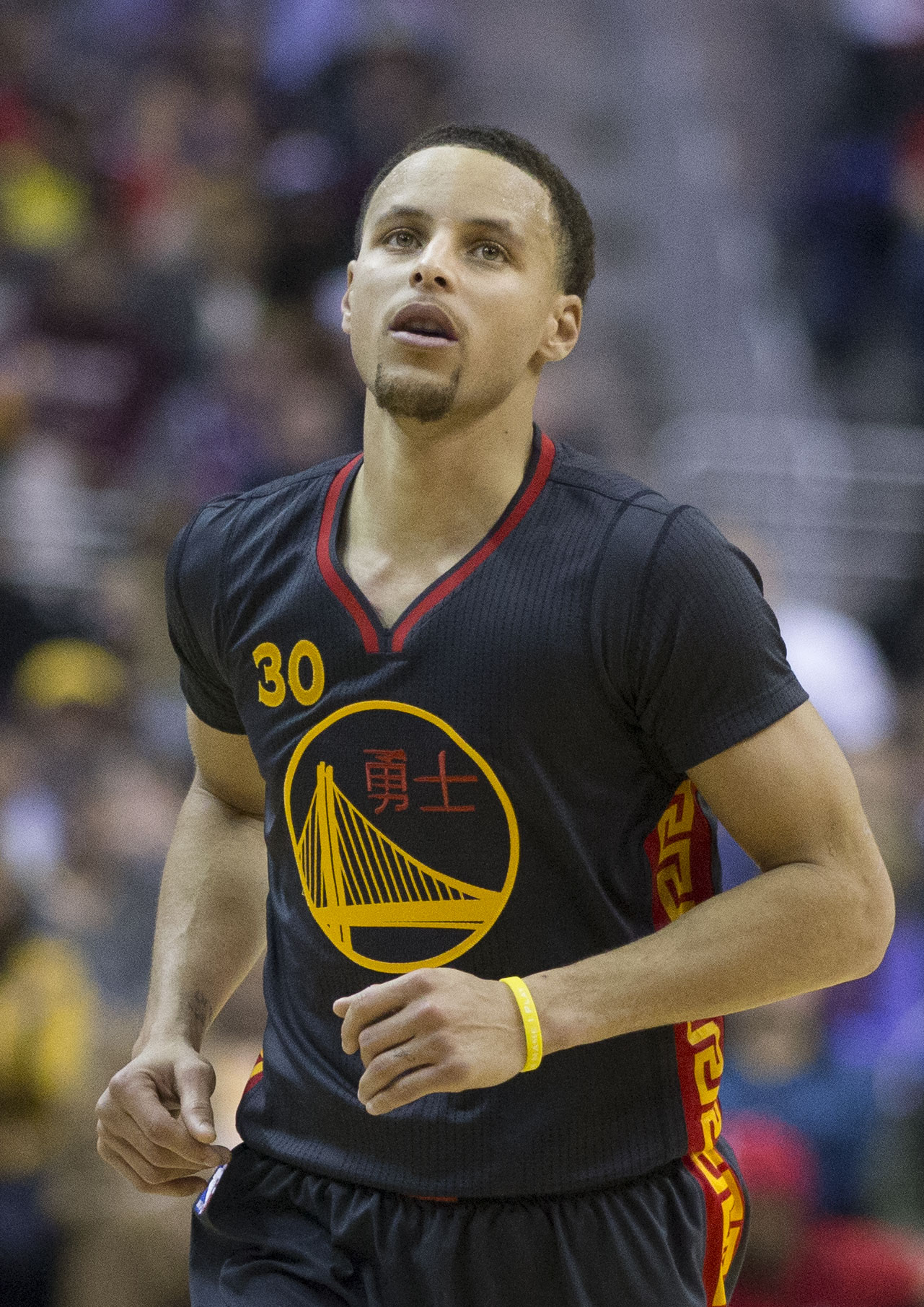
Curry during his first MVP season in 2014–15

NBA

- 4× NBA champion: 2015, 2017, 2018, 2022
- NBA Finals MVP: 2022
- 2× NBA Most Valuable Player: 2015, 2016
  - The only unanimous MVP selection in league history (2016)
- 12× NBA All-Star: 2014, 2015, 2016, 2017, 2018, 2019, 2021, 2022, 2023, 2024, 2025, 2026
- 2× NBA All-Star Game MVP: 2022, 2025
- 11× All-NBA Team selection:
  - 4× First team: 2015, 2016, 2019, 2021
  - 5× Second team: 2014, 2017, 2022, 2023, 2025
  - 2× Third team: 2018, 2024
- NBA All-Rookie First Team: 2010
- NBA Western Conference finals MVP: 2022
- NBA Clutch Player of the Year: 2024
- NBA Teammate of the Year: 2025
- NBA Sportsmanship Award: 2011
- 2× NBA Three-Point Contest champion: 2015, 2021
- NBA Skills Challenge champion: 2011
- 2× NBA scoring champion: 2016, 2021
- NBA steals leader: 2016
- 8× NBA three-point scoring leader: 2013, 2014, 2015, 2016, 2017, 2021, 2022, 2024
- 5× NBA free-throw percentage leader: 2011, 2015, 2016, 2018, 2025
- 50–40–90 club: 2016
  - The only player in league history to achieve this feat while averaging over 30 PPG
- Kareem Abdul-Jabbar Social Justice Champion: 2023
- J. Walter Kennedy Citizenship Award: 2023
- 2× Magic Johnson Award: 2016, 2024
- NBA Community Assist Award (2013–14)
- NBA 75th Anniversary Team: 2021

USA Basketball

- Olympic gold medalist: 2024
- Olympics All-Star Five: 2024
- FIBA World Cup gold medalist: 2010, 2014
- FIBA U-19 World Cup silver medalist: 2007
- USA Basketball Male Athlete of the Year: 2024

NCAA

- NCAA scoring champion: 2009
- 2× SoCon Player of the Year: 2008, 2009
- 2× SoCon Male Athlete of the Year: 2008, 2009
- Consensus first-team All-American: 2009
- Consensus second-team All-American: 2008
- 3× First-team All-SoCon: 2007, 2008, 2009
- SoCon Freshman of the Year: 2007
- SoCon All-Freshmen Team: 2007
- No. 30 retired by Davidson Wildcats

Halls of Fame

- Southern Conference Hall of Fame: Class of 2016
- Davidson Athletics Hall of Fame: Class of 2022

Golf

- American Century Championship: 2023
- Ambassador of Golf Award: 2023
- Charlie Sifford Award: 2024

Media

- AP Male Athlete of the Year: 2015
- 2× Sports Illustrated Sportsperson of the Year: 2018, (Note: As part of the Golden State Warriors.) 2022
- 5× BET Award for Sportsman of the Year: 2015, 2016, 2017, 2019, 2022
- Jackie Robinson Sports Award: 2021
- Hickok Belt: 2015
- 2× Magic Johnson Award: 2016, 2024
- 8× ESPY Award winner:
  - Best Male Athlete: 2015
  - 3× Best NBA Player: 2015, 2021, 2022
  - 2× Best Record-Breaking Performance: 2016, 2022
  - 2× Best Team: 2017, 2022
- Time 100 Most Influential People: 2016
- Time 100 Most Influential People in Philanthropy: 2025
- Sports Illustrated NBA All-Decade First Team: 2010s
- Sports Illustrated 50 Most Influential Figures in Sports: 2023
- Sporting News College Athlete of the Year: 2008
- Sporting News College All-Decade Second Team: 2000s
- 9× Forbes list of the world's top-10 highest-paid athletes: 2017, 2018, 2019, 2020, 2022, 2023, 2024, 2025, 2026
- Academy Award for Best Documentary Short Film (Note: As executive producer of The Queen of Basketball.): 2022
- Jefferson Award for Public Service: 2011

State/Local

- Section of Davidson College's John M. Belk Arena renamed "Section 30": 2017
- No. 20 retired by Charlotte Christian School: 2017
- Nine-story commemorative mural along Oakland YMCA at 2350 Broadway, Uptown Oakland: 2022
- I-77 Exit 30 renamed "The Stephen Curry Interchange": 2023
- Key to the City of San Francisco: 2013
- Key to the City of Charlotte: 2022

== Records ==
NBA

- NBA record for most three-point field goals made in history (4,270)
- NBA record for highest career free throw percentage (.913, minimum 1,200 attempts)
- NBA record for most seasons leading the league in made three-point field goals (8)
- NBA record for most three-point field goals made in a season (402 in 2015–16)
- NBA record for most consecutive games with a made three-point field goal (268)
- NBA record for most games with 10+ made three-point field goals (28)
- NBA regular season record for highest offensive plus/minus in a season (10.35 in 2015–16)
- NBA playoffs record for most three-point field goals made in history (650)
- NBA playoffs record for most three-point field goals made in a season (98 in 2015, tied with Klay Thompson)
- NBA playoffs record for most consecutive games with a made three-point field goal (132)
- NBA playoffs record for most points scored in an overtime period (17)
- NBA Finals record for most three-point field goals made in history (152)
- NBA Finals record for most three-point field goals made in a game (9)
- NBA All-Star Game record for most three-point field goals made in history (57)
- NBA All-Star Game record for most three-point field goals made in a game (16 in 2022)

Golden State Warriors

Career leader
| Category | Statistics | Ref. |
|---|---|---|
| SP | 18 | |
| GP | 1,000+ | |
| MP | 36,000+ | |
| PTS | 26,500+ | |
| AST | 6,500+ | |
| STL | 1,500+ | |
| FGM | 9,000+ | |
| FGA | 19,000+ | |
| TO | 3,000+ | |
| 3PM | 4,000+ | |
| 3PA | 10,000+ | |
| FT% | .90+ | |

Career playoffs leader
| Category | Statistics | Ref. |
|---|---|---|
| PTS | 4,000+ | |
| FGM | 1,300+ | |
| FGA | 3,000+ | |
| TO | 500+ | |
| 3PM | 600+ | |
| 3PA | 1,600+ | |
| FTM | 700+ | |
| FTA | 800+ | |

- Franchise record for most All-Star selections in history (12)
- Franchise record for most All-NBA Team selections in history (11)
- Led the Warriors to achieve the highest regular season winning record in NBA history (73–9 in 2015–16)

USA Basketball

- Olympic record for most three-point field goals made in an elimination game (9)
- Olympic record for most three-point field goals made in a final (8)
- National record for most points scored in an Olympic elimination game (36)

NCAA

- NCAA record for most three-point field goals made in a season (162 in 2007–08, tied with Darius McGhee)
- NCAA record for most three-point field goals made per game in a sophomore season (4.5 in 2007–08)

Davidson College

Career leader
| Category | Statistics | Ref. |
| PTS | 2,635 | |
| 3PM | 414 | |
| 3P% | .412 | |
| SPG | 2.1 | |
| 30PTG | 30 | |
| 40PTG | 6 | |

Season leader
| Category | Statistics | Season | Ref. |
| PTS | 974 | 2008–09 | |
| PPG | 28.6 | 2008–09 | |
| FTM | 220 | 2008–09 | |
| STL | 86 | 2008–09 | |
| FGM | 317 | 2007–08 | |
| PTS (Fr.) | 730 | 2006–07 | |
| 3PM (Fr.) | 122 | 2006–07 | |

== Career statistics ==
Legend
| GP | Games played | GS | Games started | MPG | Minutes per game |
| FG% | Field goal percentage | 3P% | 3-point field goal percentage | FT% | Free throw percentage |
| RPG | Rebounds per game | APG | Assists per game | SPG | Steals per game |
| BPG | Blocks per game | PPG | Points per game | **Bold** | Career high |
| † | Won an NBA championship | * | Led the league | ‡ | NBA record |

=== NBA ===
==== Regular season ====
| Year | Team | GP | GS | MPG | FG% | 3P% | FT% | RPG | APG | SPG | BPG | PPG |
|---|---|---|---|---|---|---|---|---|---|---|---|---|
| 2009–10 | Golden State | **80** | 77 | 36.2 | .462 | .437 | .885 | 4.5 | 5.9 | 1.9 | .2 | 17.5 |
| 2010–11 | Golden State | 74 | 74 | 33.6 | .480 | .442 | .934* | 3.9 | 5.8 | 1.5 | .3 | 18.6 |
| 2011–12 | Golden State | 26 | 23 | 28.1 | .490 | **.455** | .809 | 3.4 | 5.3 | 1.5 | .3 | 14.7 |
| 2012–13 | Golden State | 78 | 78 | **38.2** | .451 | .453 | .900 | 4.0 | 6.9 | 1.6 | .2 | 22.9 |
| 2013–14 | Golden State | 78 | 78 | 36.5 | .471 | .424 | .885 | 4.3 | **8.5** | 1.6 | .2 | 24.0 |
| 2014–15^{†} | Golden State | **80** | **80** | 32.7 | .487 | .443 | .914* | 4.3 | 7.7 | 2.0 | .2 | 23.8 |
| 2015–16 | Golden State | 79 | 79 | 34.2 | **.504** | .454 | .908* | 5.4 | 6.7 | **2.1*** | .2 | 30.1* |
| 2016–17^{†} | Golden State | 79 | 79 | 33.4 | .468 | .411 | .898 | 4.5 | 6.6 | 1.8 | .2 | 25.3 |
| 2017–18^{†} | Golden State | 51 | 51 | 32.0 | .495 | .423 | .921* | 5.1 | 6.1 | 1.6 | .2 | 26.4 |
| 2018–19 | Golden State | 69 | 69 | 33.8 | .472 | .437 | .916 | 5.3 | 5.2 | 1.3 | **.4** | 27.3 |
| 2019–20 | Golden State | 5 | 5 | 27.9 | .402 | .245 | **1.000** (Note: Due to an injury-plagued season, Curry attempted (and made) 26 free throws, thus achieving a career-high 100% free-throw percentage in a season. However, it does not stand as a season-high statistic as a free-throw percentage leader must have at least 125 made free throws in a season.) | 5.2 | 6.6 | 1.0 | **.4** | 20.8 |
| 2020–21 | Golden State | 63 | 63 | 34.2 | .482 | .421 | .916 | 5.5 | 5.8 | 1.2 | .1 | **32.0*** |
| 2021–22^{†} | Golden State | 64 | 64 | 34.5 | .437 | .380 | .923 | 5.2 | 6.3 | 1.3 | **.4** | 25.5 |
| 2022–23 | Golden State | 56 | 56 | 34.7 | .493 | .427 | .915 | **6.1** | 6.3 | .9 | **.4** | 29.4 |
| 2023–24 | Golden State | 74 | 74 | 32.7 | .450 | .408 | .923 | 4.5 | 5.1 | .7 | **.4** | 26.4 |
| 2024–25 | Golden State | 70 | 70 | 32.2 | .448 | .397 | .933* | 4.4 | 6.0 | 1.1 | **.4** | 24.5 |
| 2025–26 | Golden State | 43 | 41 | 30.9 | .468 | .393 | .923 | 3.6 | 4.7 | 1.1 | **.4** | 26.6 |
| Career | | 1,069 | 1,061 | 34.0 | .471 | .422 | .912^{‡} | 4.7 | 6.3 | 1.5 | .3 | 24.8 |
| All-Star | | 10 | 9 | 27.5 | .424 | .393 | 1.000 | 6.0 | 5.6 | 1.4 | .3 | 21.6 |

==== Playoffs ====
| Year | Team | GP | GS | MPG | FG% | 3P% | FT% | RPG | APG | SPG | BPG | PPG |
|---|---|---|---|---|---|---|---|---|---|---|---|---|
| 2013 | Golden State | 12 | 12 | 41.4 | .434 | .396 | .921 | 3.8 | 8.1 | 1.7 | .2 | 23.4 |
| 2014 | Golden State | 7 | 7 | **42.3** | .440 | .386 | .881 | 3.6 | **8.4** | 1.7 | .1 | 23.0 |
| 2015^{†} | Golden State | 21 | 21 | 39.3 | .456 | **.422** | .835 | 5.0 | 6.4 | 1.9 | .1 | 28.3 |
| 2016 | Golden State | 18 | 17 | 34.3 | .438 | .404 | .916 | 5.5 | 5.2 | 1.4 | .3 | 25.1 |
| 2017^{†} | Golden State | 17 | 17 | 35.3 | **.484** | .419 | .904 | **6.2** | 6.7 | **2.0** | .2 | 28.1 |
| 2018^{†} | Golden State | 15 | 14 | 37.0 | .451 | .395 | **.957** | 6.1 | 5.4 | 1.7 | .7 | 25.5 |
| 2019 | Golden State | **22** | **22** | 38.5 | .441 | .377 | .943 | 6.0 | 5.7 | 1.1 | .2 | 28.2 |
| 2022^{†} | Golden State | **22** | 18 | 34.7 | .459 | .397 | .829 | 5.2 | 5.9 | 1.3 | .4 | 27.4 |
| 2023 | Golden State | 13 | 13 | 37.9 | .466 | .363 | .845 | 5.2 | 6.1 | 1.0 | .5 | **30.5** |
| 2025 | Golden State | 8 | 8 | 35.1 | .477 | .400 | .893 | 5.3 | 5.1 | 1.0 | **.8** | 22.6 |
| Career | | 155 | 149 | 37.2 | .454 | .397 | .889 | 5.3 | 6.1 | 1.5 | .3 | 26.8 |

=== College ===
| Year | Team | GP | GS | MPG | FG% | 3P% | FT% | RPG | APG | SPG | BPG | PPG |
|---|---|---|---|---|---|---|---|---|---|---|---|---|
| 2006–07 | Davidson | 34 | 33 | 30.9 | .463 | .408 | .855 | **4.6** | 2.8 | 1.8 | .2 | 21.5 |
| 2007–08 | Davidson | **36** | **36** | 33.1 | **.483** | **.439** | **.894** | **4.6** | 2.9 | 2.0 | **.4** | 25.9 |
| 2008–09 | Davidson | 34 | 34 | **33.7** | .454 | .387 | .876 | 4.4 | **5.6** | **2.5** | .2 | **28.6*** |
| Career | | 104 | 103 | 32.6 | .467 | .412 | .876 | 4.5 | 3.7 | 2.1 | .3 | 25.3 |

== See also ==
- List of highest-paid NBA players by season
- List of NBA players with most championships
- List of NBA career scoring leaders
- List of NBA career assists leaders
- List of NBA career steals leaders
- List of NBA career turnovers leaders
- List of NBA career 3-point scoring leaders
- List of NBA career 3-point field goal percentage leaders
- List of NBA career playoff scoring leaders
- List of NBA career playoff assists leaders
- List of NBA career playoff steals leaders
- List of NBA career playoff turnovers leaders
- List of NBA career playoff 3-point scoring leaders
- List of NBA career playoff triple-double leaders
- List of NBA single-season 3-point scoring leaders
- List of NBA single-game 3-point scoring leaders
- List of NBA single-game scoring leaders
- List of NBA single-game playoff scoring leaders
- List of NBA franchise career scoring leaders
- List of NBA players who have spent their entire career with one franchise
- List of NCAA Division I men's basketball career scoring leaders
- List of NCAA Division I men's basketball career 3-point scoring leaders
- List of NCAA men's basketball retired numbers
- List of second-generation NBA players
- List of Olympic medalists in basketball
