= Triangle offense =

Basketball offensive strategy

The triangle offense is an offensive strategy used in basketball. Its basic ideas were initially established by Hall of Fame coach Sam Barry at the University of Southern California. His system was further developed by former Houston Rockets and Kansas State University basketball head coach Tex Winter, who played for Barry in the late 1940s. Winter later served as an assistant coach for the Chicago Bulls in the 1980s and 1990s and for the Los Angeles Lakers in the 2000s, mostly under head coach Phil Jackson.

The system's most important feature is the sideline triangle created by the center, who stands at the low post, the forward at the wing, and the guard at the corner. The team's other guard stands at the top of the key and the weak-side forward is on the weak-side high post—together forming the "two-man game". The goal of the offense is to fill those five spots, which creates good spacing between players and allows each one to pass to four teammates. Every pass and cut has a purpose and everything is dictated by the defense.

It has been claimed that the triangle offense is the optimal way for five players to space the floor on the basketball court.

== Strategy ==
The initial setup of the triangle offense, with a sideline triangle to the right of the free throw lane. The point guard (1) has brought the ball up the floor, passed to the shooting guard (2), and cut to the strong-side corner

The offense starts when a guard passes to the wing and cuts to the strong-side corner. The triangle is created from a post player on the strong-side block, the strong-side corner, and the extended strong-side wing, who gains possession on the first pass. The desired initial option in the offense is to pass to the strong-side post player on the block who is in good scoring position. From there the player has the options of looking to score or pass to one of the perimeter players who are exchanging from strong-side corner and wing, a dive cut down the lane, or the opposite wing flashing to the top of the key which initiates another common option known as the "pinch post".

If a pass to the block is not possible, the second option is either to pass to the weak-side guard who flashes top of the key from the weak-side wing position or passing to the strong-side corner. If the ball is passed to the corner the options are either shoot, pass to the strong-side block, or pick and pop with the wing. If it is passed to the weak-side guard it initiates the "pinch post" option. There are two options. The first and most common is to pass to the weak-side forward who flashes to the elbow (corner of the key at the free throw line) to receive the pass. When he does the options are a rub handoff, back door cut by guard without the ball, post up of the guard on a smaller player, or face up and attack. The second option is a pick and roll with the forward. The advantage to the first option is there are so many weapons to attack the defense it opens up a lot of freedom and ability to score effectively. The advantage on the second option is that the player who has the ball and uses the screen now has the entire side of the floor to work with to go one on one. Meanwhile, on the other side, the wing sets a screen for the corner guard on the triangle split. If the hand-off is not available, the forward or the guard can pass to the corner guard coming off the screen. If the defense overplays or expects the split, both the wing and the corner guard can back cut to the basket. During all of this time the original strong-side block player is able to establish position for an easy shot while the defender is lured by all of the movement and cutting by the other players.

If the strong-side wing-to-guard pass is not possible, the third option is for the weak-side forward to flash to the strong-side elbow, take the pass, and cut to the basket on the trademark backdoor play of the offense. Meanwhile, the wing and corner guard exchange on a down screen. The forward with the ball can pass to the cutting guard or to the corner guard coming off the wing's screen. If nothing's available, he can shoot the basketball himself.

The offense also has a variety of options if there is heavy pressure from the defense. If the initial wing-pass by the guard is not available, the triangle can be created on the other side by passing to the other guard, who then passes to the weak-side forward (who then becomes the strong-side wing). The guard, who initially had the ball, then cuts to the other corner. The center or the pressured wing can flash to the opposite post. If the guard-to-guard pass is not available, the weak-side forward can make a similar flash cut that was mentioned earlier. That also creates many cutting opportunities. If there is heavy pressure on everybody, the center can release the pressure by cutting to the high post for a pass by the ball-handling guard. That would also create space for possible cuts.

== NBA ==
The Triangle offense has been, pretty much irrefutably, the single most dominant offensive attack (in any major sport) of the past 20 years.

— Chuck Klosterman in Grantland, 2012

Head coach Phil Jackson, with help from assistant coach Tex Winter, won 11 NBA Finals with the triangle offense. Jackson coached the Bulls from 1989–1998. He next served as the head coach of the Lakers twice, first from 1999–2004, and then from 2005–2011. The Chicago Bulls under Jackson won six championships in the 1990s playing in the triangle. His first three title-winning teams in Chicago featured superstars Michael Jordan and Scottie Pippen. Jackson's later three titles with the Bulls came with Jordan, Pippen, and Dennis Rodman. Jackson's Los Angeles Lakers won five championships employing the triangle. His first three Lakers championship squads fielded superstars Shaquille O'Neal and Kobe Bryant, while his last two title teams saw him pair Bryant with fellow All-Star Pau Gasol.

Winter initially wanted to teach the triangle offense to Doug Collins, who the Bulls hired as head coach ahead of the 1986–87 season. However, Collins refused and instead he implemented an isolation-heavy offense centered around Jordan's scoring abilities. Collins even went as far as banishing Winter to the end of the Bulls bench. Despite a conference finals appearance in the 1989 playoffs, Bulls general manager Jerry Krause fired Collins after the playoffs due to his refusal to adopt Winter's system.

When Jackson became the head coach of the Chicago Bulls before the start of the 1989–1990 NBA season, he and Winter originally installed the triangle offense in an attempt to subvert the Jordan Rules strategy employed by their Eastern Conference rivals, the Detroit Pistons. The "Jordan Rules" was a defensive strategy which consisted of solely targeting Michael Jordan. Jordan had already established himself as an elite NBA superstar by single-handedly turning Chicago into a playoff contender. However, by sharing responsibility rather than shouldering it, he continued to blossom as a great all-around basketball player. More importantly, the Bulls also improved notably as a team, finishing with a 55–27 record. The Bulls fell to the Pistons in 7 games in the 1990 Eastern Conference Finals. The following year, however, Chicago finished the 1990–1991 NBA season with a then-franchise best 61–21 record, good for first place in the East, then swept the archrival Pistons 4–0 in the 1991 Eastern Conference Finals. The Bulls then defeated the Los Angeles Lakers in the NBA Finals, four games to one. Michael Jordan won his second NBA Most Valuable Player Award that season and won his first championship.

The triangle offense was used very effectively by the Bulls during the 1995–96 season. Jordan, back at the helm for the team in his first full season since coming out of retirement, won his fourth NBA MVP award. He also finished the season as the league's leading scorer for the 8th time. The Bulls recorded a then NBA-record 72–10 season en route to what was then their fourth NBA championship. Jackson won his first (and only) NBA Coach of the Year Award for his efforts during his team's record-breaking season. Overall, the Bulls won six NBA titles during the 1990s, and the team is considered to be one of the NBA's greatest dynasties.

Jackson installed the triangle offense again when he started coaching the Lakers in the 1999–2000 season, with Winter once again serving as an assistant on his staff. This time, Shaquille O'Neal and Kobe Bryant served as the focal points of the team's offense. O'Neal won the NBA MVP Award in 2000, and Bryant rose to prominence as one of the NBA's newest stars. The Lakers became an elite NBA team during Jackson's first term as their coach, making four NBA Finals appearances in five years and winning three straight championships from 2000–2002. At the end of the 2004 Finals, which resulted in losing to the Detroit Pistons, his contract was not renewed. Jackson returned to the Lakers as head coach starting in the 2005–2006 season. Despite the presence of Bryant as the centerpiece of the team, the Lakers could not get past the first round of the playoffs in 2006 or 2007. However, the team acquired versatile forward Pau Gasol from the Memphis Grizzlies during the 2008 season. With Bryant and Gasol running the triangle offense, the Lakers made the NBA Finals three straight times and won in 2009 and 2010. In the process, Jackson surpassed Red Auerbach's record of most titles won by an NBA coach.

When Phil Jackson retired as a head coach at the end of the 2010–2011 season, he finished his career with over 1000 victories over the course of his coaching career, regular season and playoff games combined. Jackson, Jordan, Pippen, Rodman, O'Neal, Bryant and Gasol are all Hall of Famers. Tex Winter earned induction into the Hall of Fame in 2011 for his contributions to basketball involving the triangle offense. He was an assistant for both the Bulls and Lakers on the first nine of Jackson's 11 championship teams, and served as a consultant to the Lakers on the final two.

Several other coaches, some of whom were either Jackson's former players or assistant coaches, tried to implement the triangle with varying degrees of success. In 1996, former Jackson assistant Jim Cleamons took over as head coach of the Dallas Mavericks, but only lasted until early in the 1997–98 season, when general manager Don Nelson fired him. Cleamons' triangle failed to click with the Mavericks' players, and after Nelson became head coach, the team abandoned it in favor of his Nellie Ball offense. Similarly, in 1993, Quinn Buckner tried to implement the triangle without success during his brief coaching career in Dallas, finishing his lone season with a 13–69 record.

After Tim Floyd replaced Jackson as Bulls head coach in 1998, he was asked by general manager Jerry Krause to use the triangle offense, and even retained Winter as an assistant for one season. However, Krause had infamously dismantled the championship team, and an inexperienced Bulls squad finished with only a 13–37 record in the lockout-shortened 1999 season. This was followed by a 17–65 record in the 1999–2000 season, and a 15–67 record in the 2000–01 season. Floyd resigned early in the 2001–02 season, and abandoned the triangle in favor of the Princeton offense during his lone season coaching the New Orleans Hornets in the 2003–04 season.

Floyd's successor, Bill Cartwright, continued to use the triangle during his three seasons with the Bulls. However, Cartwright was fired early in the 2003–04 season, and at this time, the Bulls were now under John Paxson as general manager. Paxson soon hired Scott Skiles, who promptly abandoned the triangle in favor of a more defensive-oriented, low-scoring style similar to the Detroit Pistons of the era.

Another former Jackson assistant, Kurt Rambis, tried using the triangle without success during his brief two-year stint with the Minnesota Timberwolves from 2009 to 2011. In 2014, former Bulls player Steve Kerr began using a hybrid triangle upon joining the Golden State Warriors as head coach, mixing in certain aspects of run and gun and small ball to huge success. Kerr has so far coached the Warriors to four NBA championships between 2015 and 2022.

In 2014, Jackson joined the New York Knicks as president of basketball operations, and hired former Laker Derek Fisher as the head coach in hopes of installing the triangle offense. However, the Knicks failed to finish with a winning season. Nor did the team make the playoffs in each of Jackson's three seasons. Fisher's tenure lasted until midway through the 2015–16 season, after which he was fired and replaced by Kurt Rambis for the remainder of the season. Jeff Hornacek took over as the Knicks head coach for the 2016-2017 season, but he, too, couldn't deliver a winning season for the Knicks.

The triangle offense, while successful during Jackson's legendary coaching career, has proved to be less effective in comparison to modern NBA offenses, which place more emphasis on perimeter shooting and player versatility. This is due in large part to the increased efficiency of the 3-point shot. In addition, players' improving 3-point proficiency and range provides much of the floor spacing that is one of the hallmarks of the triangle. It also did not help that Knicks players, especially Carmelo Anthony, were reluctant to learn the offense, and lacked the necessary discipline and patience to run the triangle. Jackson was dismissed after the 2016–17 season.

== International ==
Tim Cone, the current head coach of the Barangay Ginebra San Miguel, continued the movement in the triangle offense and brought it to the PBA in 1989 when he was in Alaska Milkmen, thus aiding him to win a league-record 25 championships with three different franchises.
