= Nellie Ball =

Basketball tactic developed by Don Nelson

Nellie Ball is an offensive strategy in basketball developed by NBA head coach Don "Nellie" Nelson. It is a fast-paced run-and-gun offense relying on smaller, more athletic players who can create mismatches by outrunning their opponents. A true center is usually not needed to run this type of offense. A large volume of three-point attempts is also a feature of Nellie Ball. This offense is most effective against teams that do not have the athleticism or shooting ability to keep up with the fast pace.

== Background ==
Don Nelson first became known for his unorthodox, innovative style of basketball as head coach of the Milwaukee Bucks. As he was developing Nellie Ball, he introduced the concept of the point forward, a tactic wherein small forwards play the role of point guard and direct his offense. First, he used 6′7″ Marques Johnson as a point forward. Later, he used 6′5″ Paul Pressey in the same role. This enabled shooting guards Sidney Moncrief and either Craig Hodges or Ricky Pierce to be on the floor at the same time despite the absence of a pure point guard. To further create mismatches, Nelson placed a center who was not a threat on offense, such as Alton Lister or Randy Breuer, at mid-court while running a play. This forced a shot-blocking center out of the paint, making him less of a threat on defense. Nelson's high-scoring Bucks earned multiple Central Division titles, and were a perennial playoff contender throughout his time as Milwaukee's coach.

Nelson continued to perfect Nellie Ball in three later coaching stops. He again used Nellie Ball with the Golden State Warriors, where his offense was centered on a high-scoring trio of NBA All-Stars: Tim Hardaway, Mitch Richmond, and Chris Mullin, collectively known as "Run TMC" (the initials of the players' first names and a play on the name of the popular rap group Run DMC). Nelson used an unconventional lineup that featured three guards (Richmond, Hardaway and Šarūnas Marčiulionis) and two forwards (Mullin and the 6′8″ Rod Higgins at center). This incarnation of Nellie Ball led the Warriors to a pair of playoff upsets as a seventh seed: first against 7-foot-4-inch (2.24 m) Mark Eaton and the Utah Jazz in the 1989 playoffs, and then against David Robinson and the San Antonio Spurs in the 1991 playoffs.

While coaching the Dallas Mavericks, Nelson employed Nellie Ball once again, utilizing the All-Star trio of Steve Nash, Michael Finley, and Dirk Nowitzki. Nelson often played Nowitzki, a natural power forward, at the center position, placing him at the three-point line in order to stretch out the defense. Nelson's trio of star players spearheaded the Mavericks' transformation into a promising young franchise capable of reaching the NBA Playoffs.

Nelson's last taste of success with Nellie Ball came with his second stint as head coach of Golden State, with a lineup consisting of Baron Davis and Jason Richardson, who were both larger-sized guards, and smaller forwards and centers such as Stephen Jackson and Al Harrington. In the 2007 NBA Playoffs, his 8th-seeded Warriors met his former team, the 1st-seeded Dallas Mavericks. The Mavericks had posted a franchise best 67–15 record, which was also good for the best record in the NBA in 2007. Dirk Nowitzki, in particular, enjoyed a memorable season of his own, winning the NBA MVP Award that year. Despite these obstacles, Nelson's Warriors executed one of the greatest upsets in NBA history by defeating the Mavericks in six games. Then-Mavericks head coach Avery Johnson, Nelson's protégé and successor in Dallas, had abandoned Nellie Ball in favor of a more traditional offensive lineup, which had reached the 2006 NBA Finals.

Over the course of his coaching career, Don Nelson accumulated 1,335 regular season victories. He was the all-time leader in regular season wins, until his record was broken by San Antonio Spurs head coach Gregg Popovich during the 2021-22 NBA season. Nelson won the NBA Coach of the Year Award three times: He won the award in 1983 and 1985 with the Bucks, and in 1992 with the Warriors. In 2012, Nelson earned induction into the Basketball Hall of Fame. During the 21-22 NBA season, Nelson was chosen as one of the NBA's 15 greatest coaches in honor of the league's 75th anniversary. However, Nelson has never coached a team to the NBA Finals, let alone won an NBA title. On more than one occasion, his teams were eliminated by more talented opponents.

== Critics of Nellie Ball ==
Nellie Ball has a number of critics, who claim that the strategy is fatally flawed. Some critics contend that no team can ever win a championship playing Nellie Ball, mainly because the strategy puts such an emphasis on offense and scoring that a team playing Nellie Ball will not have the energy to play defense. Nellie Ball also tends to rely very little on basketball's defensive fundamentals.

In addition, these critics argue that Nelson's offense, while innovative and exciting, is only successful to a point. Skeptics contend that his offense is unable to disguise deficiencies, such as the inability of an undersized power forward or center in Nelson's system, to be dominant in terms of defense and rebounding. Plus, they claim that it is even more difficult to play Nellie Ball when guards are on a cold streak in terms of shooting the ball, making it difficult for teams running the offense to win basketball games. Nowhere is this more evident than during playoff time, where teams tend to get more serious and play tougher defense.

While the Bucks under Nelson were an NBA powerhouse during the 1980s, they lacked a top-tier scorer and playmaker who could take over close games. Between 1981 and 1987, the Bucks were eliminated in the playoffs by either Julius Erving's Philadelphia 76ers or Larry Bird's Boston Celtics. The Run-TMC Warriors, on the other hand, lacked a strong supporting cast, and were eliminated by deeper and stronger units, such as the Kevin Johnson-led Phoenix Suns. For instance, in 1992, despite posting a 55-win campaign, the Warriors fell in the first round to the Gary Payton and Shawn Kemp-led Seattle SuperSonics, who went on to become a league powerhouse during the 1990s.

During the 1995–96 NBA season, when Nelson became the head coach of the New York Knicks, he tried to implement his Nellie Ball system with the Knicks. However, his fast-paced, offensive-oriented philosophy clashed with the hard-nosed, defensive-oriented approach that the players preferred. Despite coaching New York to a 34–25 record, the Knicks fired Nelson anyway. He was replaced by Jeff Van Gundy, who restored the team's defense-first style used by Nelson's predecessor, Pat Riley.

When Nelson was the head coach of the Mavericks during the Finley–Nash–Nowitzki era, he lacked a strong inside presence who was capable of competing defensively with other dominant interior players, such as Shaquille O'Neal and Tim Duncan. Duncan's Spurs, in particular, eliminated Dallas twice in the playoffs (2001 and 2003). Similarly, Nelson coached a largely top-heavy roster akin to his first stint with the Warriors, with the Chris Webber-led Sacramento Kings exposing the team in two playoff series victories in 2002 and 2004.

Avery Johnson, Nelson's protégé and successor in Dallas, abandoned Nellie Ball in favor of a more traditional offensive lineup, which reached the 2006 NBA Finals. En route, they defeated Mike D'Antoni's Phoenix Suns, the latter using an up-tempo style centered on former Mavs superstar and 2-time NBA MVP Steve Nash. Although the Mavericks lost to the Miami Heat in the NBA Finals that year, Johnson won the 2006 NBA Coach of the Year Award for making Dallas a better defensive team while still keeping their up-tempo style of offense.

In 2007, the 8th-seeded "We Believe" Warriors under Nelson defeated the top-seeded Mavericks in a historic upset in the first round by controlling the game tempo. However, the team failed to sustain that level of success in the following years, mainly due to the eventual departures of Jason Richardson and Baron Davis and the team's lack of depth. The Warriors never made the playoffs again in Nelson's final three seasons, and parted ways with him in 2010. In Nelson's final season as Warriors head coach, the team drafted Stephen Curry, who would go on to become one of the league's top players and the face of a three-point revolution that changed the league in the mid-2010s and won Golden State several championships.

== Success of the Nellie Ball formula ==
Despite Nelson's inability to win a title using Nellie Ball, his formula was arguably successful at least once. The Miami Heat successfully used a variation of Nelson's approach ("positionless" as coined by Heat coach Erik Spoelstra) in the 2012 NBA Finals to defeat the Oklahoma City Thunder in 5 games. The Heat used a point-forward, athleticism and small ball to create mismatches, spaced the floor for 3-point shooters, and did not use a true center.

LeBron James often ran the offense and rotated with Shane Battier between the small and power forward positions, and Chris Bosh shifted from his natural power forward position to center. Battier—a constant threat from the 3-point line—forced the Thunder's Serge Ibaka to cover him at the perimeter, thus neutralizing his shot-blocking at the rim and giving more room for Heat slashers like LeBron James, Dwyane Wade, and Mario Chalmers to attack the rim. This approach also created a mismatch for Chris Bosh. Bosh's quickness and athleticism wore down on Thunder center Kendrick Perkins, who was forced to guard Bosh away from the basket due to Bosh's polished mid-range game. The Heat's 3-point assault came from Chalmers, Battier, and Mike Miller, who fought injuries in the decisive fifth game and shot 7–8 from 3-point range.

Further validation of the Nellie Ball formula has been served in recent years, courtesy of one of Nelson's former teams, the Golden State Warriors. Ever since the 2014-15 NBA season, the Warriors have been coached by Steve Kerr. Kerr's hybrid style of offense employs elements of the triangle offense of his former Chicago Bulls head coach, Phil Jackson, as well as the space-and-pace system of Gregg Popovich, whom Kerr played for when he was with the San Antonio Spurs. He also utilizes the up-tempo principles he learned under Phoenix Suns head coaches Mike D'Antoni and Alvin Gentry (when Kerr was the general manager of the Suns).

When the Warriors won the 2015 NBA Championship, they successfully closed out the 2015 NBA Finals against the Cleveland Cavaliers using a Nellie Ball-style "Death Lineup." This lineup consisted of Stephen Curry, Klay Thompson, Andre Iguodala, Harrison Barnes and Draymond Green. In 2016, Golden State recorded a 73–9 regular season record, the best in NBA history. But the Warriors lost to LeBron James and the Cavaliers in the NBA Finals, with James and the Cavaliers becoming the first and only team to rally from a 3-1 deficit to win the NBA Championship. However, in 2017 and 2018, Golden State won back-to-back NBA titles, defeating Cleveland both times in the process. This time, the high-flying Warriors were powered by Curry, Thompson, Green, and fellow superstar Kevin Durant.

The 2021-22 season was occasionally hard for Kerr and his Warriors. Thompson, who had suffered a left ACL injury during the 2019 NBA Finals, and then sustained a right Achilles tendon rupture in 2020, successfully returned to the Warriors in January 2022 after being sidelined for 31 months. However, other Golden State players, including Green and Curry, were plagued by injuries, but Kerr was still able to guide Golden State to a 53–29 record. In the 2022 Playoffs, the now fully healthy Warriors jelled impressively on the basketball court. After cruising fairly smoothly through all 3 rounds of the Western Conference playoffs, the Warriors defeated a Boston Celtics squad in the 2022 NBA Finals, winning the series in 6 games.

Like Nelson, Kerr was named one of the NBA's 15 greatest coaches during the league's 75th anniversary season in 2021. Kerr himself won 4 NBA titles as a head coach.

Additionally, multiple teams have adopted different variations of Nellie Ball, with point forwards orchestrating some of the most prolific offenses in the current NBA.

== See also ==
- Grinnell System
- Small ball (basketball)
