= Peter Elman =

American writer and musician

Peter Elman is an American writer, musician and teacher. Elman has performed and recorded with artists such as Peaches & Herb, Lacy J. Dalton, Roy Buchanan and Tom Johnston. In 1990, Elman recorded Durango Saloon, a collection of instrumental pieces inspired by the American West. In 1993, he followed that with Dakota Nights, and in 1994 released Race Point, an album that ranges from rock to Caribbean rhythms to plaintive ballads. 1998 brought First Take, an instrumental rock album featuring Stef Burns on guitar.

His albums have sold over 100,000 copies and his music has been played in films, television and nationwide on adult alternative radio. Larry King Live featured music from Race Point, the CBS Movie of the Week, Blue Rodeo, featured music from Durango Saloon, and ABC's Good Morning America also used music from Durango Saloon.

== Biography ==
Elman grew up in Glen Echo, Maryland, where he learned the piano at the age of seven. His cousin Sidney Lippman who wrote the classic “Too Young” for Nat King Cole. Elman was inspired by music from Chicago, Memphis and New Orleans. He started playing professionally in rock and soul bands in the Washington, D.C. area at the age of 11. Elman attended college in Boston where he played trombone in the band Swallow. He moved to California with the band Lazy River in 1973 and lived in Austin, Texas from 1976 to 1977, where he played with members of The Willie Nelson Band. He moved back to California in 1977, settling in the Bay Area, where he worked as a session musician on dozens of records and national television and radio ads. Elman was an original member of the San Francisco band, Pride & Joy. He moved to the East Bay in 1985, where he lives with his wife Lisa Goulder, a singer, songwriter, pianist and a longtime voice and piano instructor. They have two children.

== Musician ==
Through his production company, Real Dream Music, Elman has produced several albums for various artists, among them Wintercreek by Tony Elman, Santa Fe Trails for Brentwood Music, Dream by Michael DeWall, First and Ten by Tom McCord, Glaciers Come, Glaciers Go by Ned Selfe, and Camptown by Joe Craven. Camptown received positive reviews in the Oakland Tribune, Sing Out magazine, AllMusic and the Chicago Tribune, which gave the album 3½ stars and called it "A success and unique for a 'traditional music disc'".

== Writer ==
Elman was the columnist for the Oakland Fan Coalition from 2000-2005 and covered local prep and college sports for the Contra Costa Times from 2000-2011. He has worked since 2014 as a columnist for the Ultimate Sports Guide. In 1991 Elman won The San Francisco Examiner's contest to come up with a nickname for the three stars of the Golden State Warriors: Tim Hardaway, Mitch Richmond and Chris Mullin. One of six entrants who entered the name Run TMC, he was declared the winner in a drawing.

In 2013, along with Michael DeWall, Elman published a children’s picture book and CD: Seasons, Rhymes in Time. In 2023, he published two books: Remember Their Sacrifice, the story of unsung minority athletes who overcame the odds to achieve greatness, both off and on the field; and Insights and Outtakes, a collection of his articles on sports and culture written for the Ultimate Sports Guide.

Elman is currently working on several other books: two middle grade-young adult novels, a collection of biographical vignettes, a cookbook and his memoirs of an American rock and roll musician.

== Teacher ==
From 1979-82, Elman taught rock and blues workshops for Blue Bear School of Music in San Francisco, the “first American college of rock and roll”. From 2002-2015 he taught English, History, Special Education and PE for private and public school at levels K-12.

Elman is currently teaching 14 different adult classes on the history, role and importance of contemporary popular music at universities and other venues in the Bay Area.
