= Don Nelson =

American basketball player and coach (1940–2026)

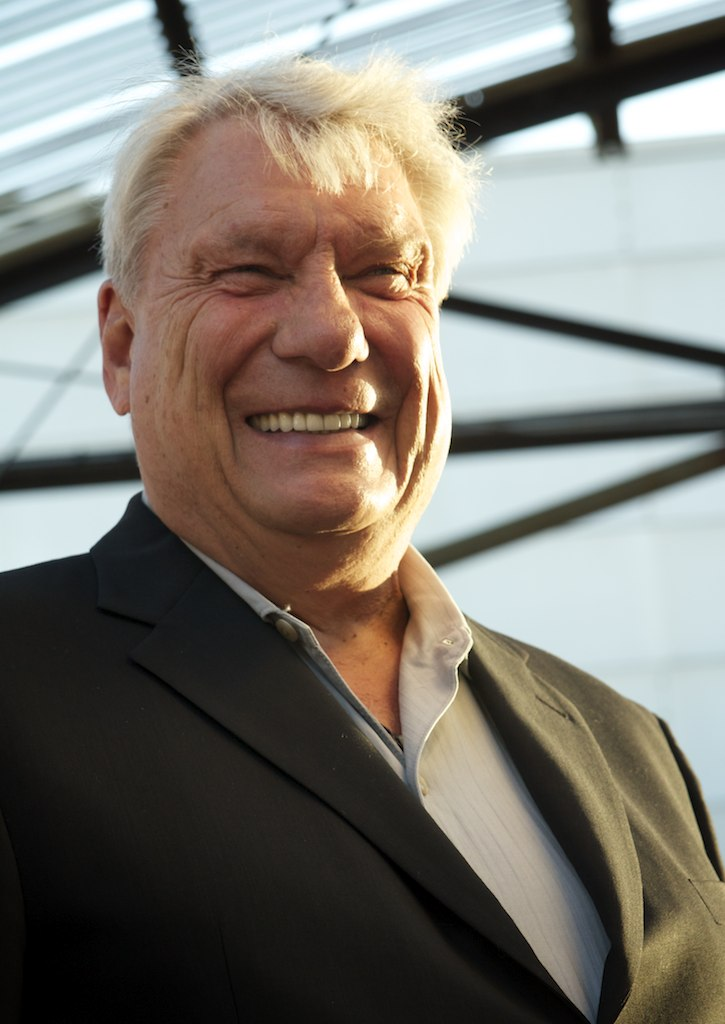
- Nelson in 2012

Personal information
- Born: May 15, 1940 Muskegon, Michigan, U.S.
- Died: August 9, 2026 (aged 86) Frisco, Texas, U.S.
- Listed height: 6 ft 6 in (1.98 m)
- Listed weight: 210 lb (95 kg)

Career information
- High school: Rock Island (Rock Island, Illinois)
- College: Iowa (1959–1962)
- NBA draft: 1962: 3rd round, 17th overall pick
- Drafted by: Chicago Zephyrs
- Playing career: 1962–1976
- Position: Small forward
- Number: 44, 20, 19
- Coaching career: 1976–2010

Career history

Playing
- 1962–1963: Chicago Zephyrs
- 1963–1965: Los Angeles Lakers
- 1965–1976: Boston Celtics

Career highlights
- As player: 5× NBA champion (1966, 1968, 1969, 1974, 1976); No. 19 retired by Boston Celtics; Third-team All-American – AP, NABC, UPI (1962); As coach: 3× NBA Coach of the Year (1983, 1985, 1992); 2× NBA All-Star Game head coach (1992, 2002); Top 10 Coaches in NBA History; Top 15 Coaches in NBA History; Chuck Daly Lifetime Achievement Award (2025)

Career playing statistics
- Points: 10,898 (10.3 ppg)
- Rebounds: 5,192 (4.9 rpg)
- Assists: 1,526 (1.4 apg)
- Stats at NBA.com
- Stats at Basketball Reference

Career coaching record
- NBA: 1335–1063 (.557)
- Record at Basketball Reference
- Basketball Hall of Fame
Medals
Men's basketball
Representing the United States
FIBA World Championship
Gold medal – first place	1994 Toronto	Team competition

Donald Arvid Nelson (May 15, 1940 – August 9, 2026) was an American professional basketball player and head coach. He coached the Milwaukee Bucks, New York Knicks, Dallas Mavericks, and Golden State Warriors of the National Basketball Association (NBA). After an All-American career playing college basketball for the Iowa Hawkeyes, Nelson won five NBA championships playing with the Boston Celtics, with his number 19 retired by the franchise in 1978.

His unique brand of basketball was often referred to as "Nellie Ball". A coaching innovator, Nelson is credited with, among other things, having pioneered the concept of the point forward, a tactic which is frequently employed by teams at every level today. He was named one of the Top 10 coaches in NBA history.

On April 7, 2010, Nelson passed Lenny Wilkens for first place on the all-time NBA wins list with his 1,333rd career win. His all-time record coaching record was 1,335–1,063 (.557). Nelson held the record for the most regular season wins of any coach in NBA history until he was surpassed by Gregg Popovich in 2022. Nelson was inducted into the Naismith Basketball Hall of Fame in 2012.

== Early life ==
Donald Arvid Nelson was born on May 15, 1940, in Muskegon, Michigan, to Arvid and Agnes Nelson. Nelson grew up with his family and two sisters on his grandfather's rural Illinois farm near Sherrard, Illinois. He first learned basketball shooting in the chicken yard where a spokeless bicycle wheel was nailed to the shed to make a basket. Nelson attended a one-room, six-grade, seven-student school. When his family lost the farm, the Nelsons moved to nearby Rock Island, Illinois, while Don was in middle school. His father Arvid eventually worked at the Rock Island Arsenal.

Nelson attended Rock Island High School, in Rock Island, one of the Quad Cities. The Nelsons lived in downtown Rock Island on 19th street and Don would walk to school, stopping to shoot baskets at several different locations along the way. Nelson would go to the YMCA after practice and shoot more.

Graduating in 1958, Nelson led the Rocks to a 47–7 record in his last two years under coach Bob Riley. He had 39 points and 20 rebounds against Moline High School and 30 points and 29 rebounds against No. 1–ranked Ottawa High School. As a junior, Nelson averaged 12.6 points as Rock Island finished 25–3. As a senior, Nelson averaged 20.2 points, leading the Rocks to a 22–4 record in 1957–58.

After his senior year in high school, Nelson wasn't heavily recruited. His father did not see a future for Don in basketball and wanted him to become a watch repairman. University of Iowa Coach Sharm Scheuerman, who had graduated from Rock Island in 1952, recruited Nelson, who ultimately chose the Hawkeyes over Wheaton College and Nelson's hometown's Augustana College.

== College career ==
As a 6-foot-6-inch (1.98 m) sophomore under coach Schuerman at Iowa, Nelson averaged a double-double of 15.8 points and 10.0 rebounds, as Iowa finished 14–10 in 1959–1960.

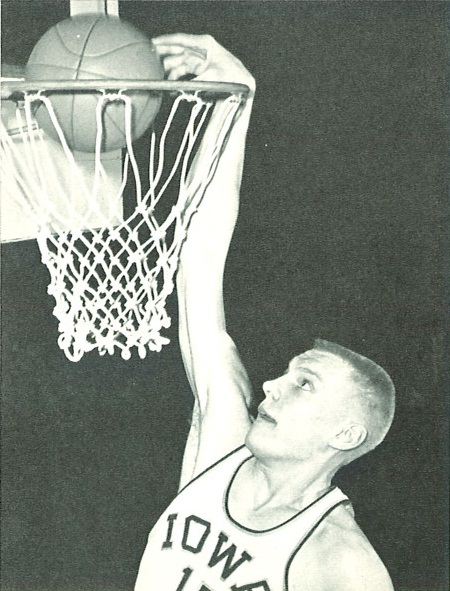
Nelson playing for Iowa, c. 1962

In the era when NCAA freshman weren't allowed to play varsity, Nelson was joined on the Iowa campus by future Hall of Famer Connie Hawkins in 1960. However, after playing for the freshman Iowa team in 1960–1961, Hawkins was embroiled in the 1961 college basketball gambling scandal and left Iowa. Hawkins was never charged with a crime and was later reinstated by the NBA, who had banned him. "If Connie had stayed, we would have had a great team," Nelson said. "I feel we could have edged out Ohio State my junior and senior years."

In 1960–1961, Nelson averaged 23.8 points and 10.6 rebounds as Iowa finished second in the Big Ten Conference with an 18–6 record. A mass academic eligibility issue hit the team, as the other four starters were declared academically ineligible that semester, leaving Nelson as the only starter remaining. With Nelson carrying the team, Iowa rallied around him and finished 2nd in the Big 10.

As a senior in 1961–1962, Nelson averaged 23.8 points and 11.9 rebounds as the Hawkeyes finished 13–11. In Nelson's years at Iowa, the Big Ten conference was full of future NBA players. Among others, Ohio State had future Hall of Fame players in John Havlicek and Jerry Lucas, along with Larry Siegfried. Indiana had a future Hall of Fame inductee in Walt Bellamy, while Purdue had future NBA All-Star Terry Dischinger. "It was a terrific training ground for the pros," Nelson said. "So many of them became stars." "It's an overused phrase, but the tougher the game got, the tougher Don played," Scheuerman said of Nelson. "He always had a lot of savvy. Don did some things you just can't coach. Some players have the body, but aren't mentally tough. Others are mentally tough, but don't have the body. Don had both."

"I felt more responsibility and my teammates expected me to carry a bigger portion of the load," Nelson said of his Iowa career. "I still look back at that time as one of the highlights of my whole career. Sharm did a terrific job coaching and we played some terrific basketball."

"What I remember most about it is playing for Sharm and our relationship over 50 years and how close we were and how much I loved that man," Nelson reflected in 2012 of Scheuerman, who died in 2010. "A role model certainly, but I could never duplicate that man's life because he was so special. I certainly tried. I'm certainly a better person just by knowing him and talking to him. But we spent a lot of time together over the last 50 years." Overall, Nelson averaged 21.1 points (1,522) and 10.9 rebounds (784) in his 72-game Iowa career. He left Iowa as the program's all-time leading scorer.

== Professional career ==
=== Chicago Zephyrs (1962–1963) ===
After his career at Iowa, Nelson was selected as the 17th draft pick in the 1962 NBA draft by the Chicago Zephyrs of the NBA.

As a rookie, Nelson averaged 17 minutes, playing alongside Walt Bellamy (27.9 points), Terry Dischinger (25.5 points), Si Green, and Charlie Hardnett. Zephyrs Coach Jack McMahon was replaced by player Slick Leonard halfway through the season as Chicago finished 25–55. The Chicago Zephyrs moved to become the Baltimore Bullets after the season. Nelson played for the Zephyrs for one season averaging 6.8 points, 4.5 rebounds, and 1.2 assists in:an average playing time of 17 minutes per game.

=== Los Angeles Lakers (1963–1965) ===
On September 6, 1963, Nelson was claimed on waivers by the Los Angeles Lakers from the Chicago Zephyrs. He played in 80 games in the 1963–64 season, but just 39 in the following season under coach Fred Schaus.

In his first season, Nelson played 80 games and averaged 5.2 points, 4.0 rebounds, and 1.0 assists in 17 minutes per game for the Lakers, as Los Angeles finished 42–38. He saw his first playoff action, as the Lakers were defeated by the St. Louis Hawks in five games. Nelson averaged 3.4 points and 2.6 rebounds in the series.

In the 1964–65 season, Nelson played little, averaging 2.4 points and 1.9 rebounds in just six minutes per game in 39 games. The Lakers used Nelson more in the playoffs as they defeated Nelson's former team, the Baltimore Bullets in the playoffs 4–2. Nelson averaged 5.2 points, 5.3 rebounds, and 2.0 assists in the series. The Lakers then faced the Boston Celtics in the 1965 NBA Finals. The Lakers lost to the Celtics in five games, as Nelson averaged 7.2 points, 5.4 rebounds, and 1.4 assists in 20 minutes per game in the series.

After two seasons with the Lakers, where he averaged 4.3 points and 3.3 rebounds in 13 minutes playing alongside Hall of Famers Elgin Baylor and Jerry West, Nelson left Los Angeles.

=== Boston Celtics (1965–1976) ===
After playing against them the season before in the NBA Finals, Nelson was signed as a free agent by the Boston Celtics on October 28, 1965.

In his first season with Boston and coach Red Auerbach, Nelson averaged 10.2 points and 5.4 rebounds, helping the Celtics to the 1966 NBA Championship over the Lakers. Nelson became a sixth man off the bench for Boston, playing alongside Hall of Famers Bill Russell, Sam Jones, Satch Sanders, John Havlicek, and KC Jones, as well as Larry Siegfried, Willie Naulls, and Mel Counts.

Four more championships with Boston followed in 1968, 1969, 1974, and 1976.

In the 1967–68 season, Nelson was one of seven Celtics to average in double figures, as the Celtics finished 54–28 under player/coach Bill Russell. Nelson joined Russell, Havlicek, Bailey Howell, Sam Jones, Sanders, and Siegfried in double digit scoring. The Celtics defeated the Lakers in six games in the 1968 NBA Finals to capture the NBA Championship. In the 1968 NBA Finals, Nelson averaged 14.0 points, 8.0 rebounds, and 1.7 assists in 27 minutes per game.

In the 1968–69 season, Nelson averaged 11.6 points and 5.6 rebounds as Boston finished 48–34 under Russell. They defeated the Philadelphia 76ers 4–1 and the New York Knicks 4–2 to advance to the NBA finals, where again they faced the Lakers. In Game 7 of the 1969 NBA Finals, against his former team, Nelson converted one of the most famous shots in playoff history—a foul-line jumper which dropped through the basket after hitting the back rim and bouncing several feet straight up. The shot, taken with just over a minute to go in the game and the Celtics clinging to a 103–102 lead, helped secure Boston's 11th NBA title in 13 seasons and Nelson's third title with the Celtics.

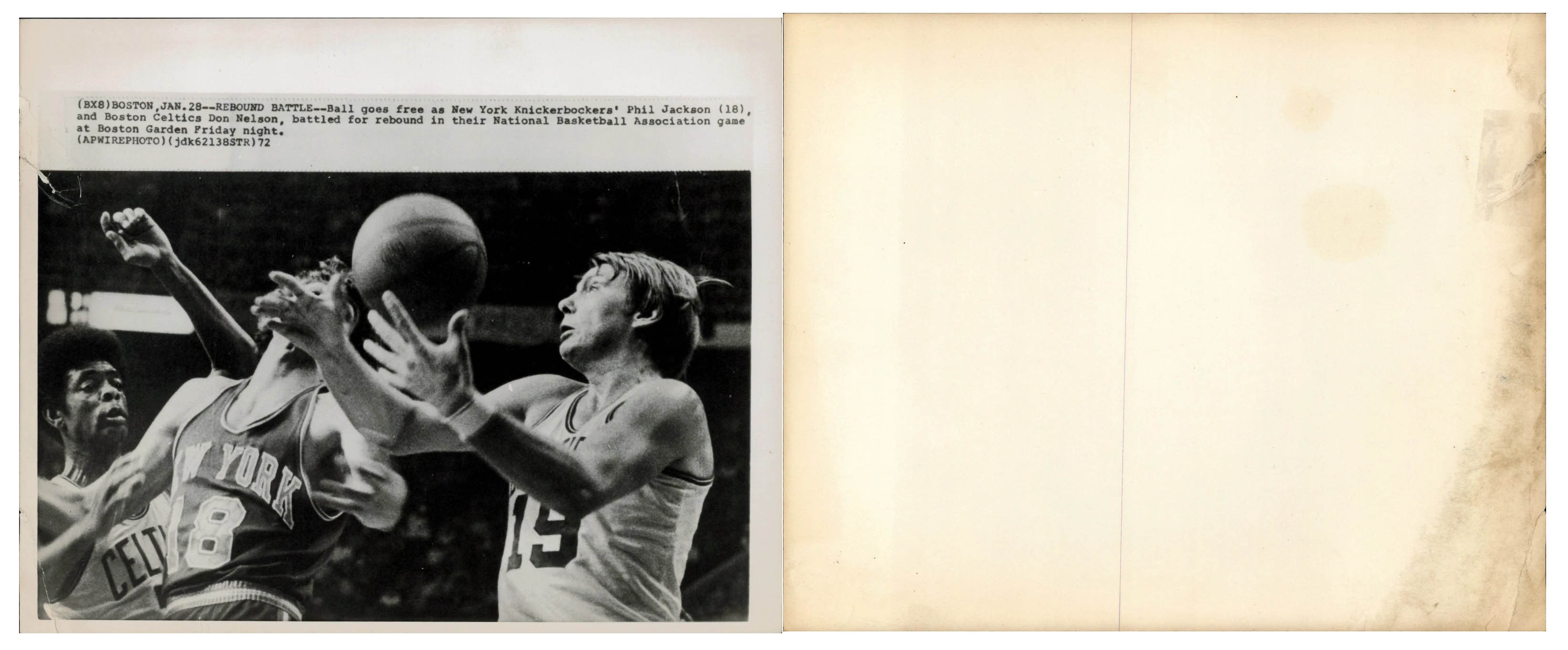
Nelson and Phil Jackson battling for rebound in a Celtics vs Knicks game at Boston Garden in 1972

In the 1973–74 season, after rebuilding, the Celtics finished 56–26 under coach Tommy Heinsohn, as Nelson averaged 11.5 points and 4.2 rebounds in 21.3 minutes at age 33. Nelson and Havlicek were now joined by Jo Jo White, Dave Cowens, Paul Westphal, Paul Silas, and Don Chaney on the roster.

In the first playoff round against the Buffalo Braves, Nelson scored over 20 points three times, averaging 15.7 points as the Celtics won in six games. In the Eastern Conference finals against the New York Knicks (a team that had beat Boston in the playoffs in the past two seasons), Nelson scored 23 points in a game 2 win, averaging 15 points as Boston won in five games.

In the 1974 NBA Finals, the Celtics faced the Milwaukee Bucks, whise lineup included Kareem Abdul-Jabbar, Oscar Robertson, and Bobby Dandridge. In game seven at Milwaukee, Nelson started over Silas and played a key part in double-teaming Abdul-Jabbar. He scored six points in 17 minutes as Boston had a 13-point halftime lead and won 102–87, securing their fourth NBA championship with Nelson.

Nelson played his last season in the 1975–76 season, and won his fifth NBA championship as Boston defeated the Phoenix Suns in the 1976 NBA Finals in six games. Nelson averaged 6.4 points and 2.4 rebounds in the regular season and 9.1 points and 2.9 rebounds in the playoffs.

=== Career totals ===
Nelson averaged more than 10 points per game every season between 1968–69 and 1974–75. He led the NBA in field-goal percentage in 1974–75 at age 34, the oldest and shortest player to do so. Nelson was coined as one of the best "sixth men" ever to play in the NBA. He was also known for his distinctive one-handed style for shooting free throws. He would place the ball in his shooting hand, lean in almost off-balance and toe the free-throw line with his right foot and his left leg trailing. He would then push the ball toward the basket completely with his right hand while springing with his right knee and lifting his trailing foot in a sort of "hop".

Nelson retired as a player following the 1975–76 season. His number 19 jersey was retired to the Boston Garden rafters in 1978. In 872 games with Boston over 11 seasons, Nelson averaged 11.4 points, 5.2 rebounds, and 1.6 assists.

Overall, in 1053 career NBA games, Nelson averaged 10.3 points, 4.9 rebounds, and 1.4 assists in a 20.6 minutes per game average, shooting 48.4% from the floor and 76.9% from the line. In 150 career playoff games, Nelson averaged 10.5 points, 4.8 rebounds, and 1.4 assists in 21.4 minutes, shooting 49.8% from the floor and 81.9% from the line.

== Coaching and executive career (1976–2010) ==
=== Milwaukee Bucks (1976–1988) ===
After his playing career's end, Nelson's son Donnie remembers the family sitting in a Maid Rite restaurant in Moline, Illinois, and Don saying he had three choices: sell cars, become an NBA referee, or accept an assistant's job under Milwaukee coach Larry Costello. They voted 5–0 for the Milwaukee job, which paid $25,000.

Nelson began his coaching career as an assistant with the Milwaukee Bucks in 1976. After a 3–15 start to the season, Larry Costello resigned and Nelson was named Head Coach. A year later he became General Manager of the Bucks and soon began to show what would later become his signature style of wheeling and dealing players. Nelson made his first trade in 1977 by sending Swen Nater to the Buffalo Braves and turned the draft pick he received into Marques Johnson, who had a solid career with the Bucks. On November 25, 1977, the day after Thanksgiving, Nelson managed the greatest fourth-quarter comeback in NBA history. With Milwaukee down twenty-nine points to Atlanta, on the road, and with only 8:43 remaining, the Bucks went on a 35–4 run to win 117–115 in regulation.

In 1980, he sent off an underachieving Kent Benson to the Detroit Pistons for Bob Lanier. Perhaps his most publicized deal came before the 1984–85 season when he dealt Johnson, Junior Bridgeman, Harvey Catchings, and cash to the San Diego Clippers for Terry Cummings, Craig Hodges, and Ricky Pierce. And, in 1986, he would deal Alton Lister to the Seattle SuperSonics for Jack Sikma.

Taking over a Bucks team in the aftermath of Kareem Abdul-Jabbar's departure to Los Angeles, Nelson was able to improve their win total by 14 games in his first full season as head coach, and established the team as a legitimate championship contender by 1980. It was in Milwaukee where Nelson became known for his unorthodox, innovative basketball philosophy. He pioneered the concept of the point forward – a tactic wherein small forwards are used to direct the offense. In Nelson's tenure with the Bucks, he used 6–5 small forward Paul Pressey for the role. This enabled Nelson to field shooting guards Sidney Moncrief and Craig Hodges or Ricky Pierce at the same time without worrying about who would run the offense. In his offensive half-court sets, he would also put a center who wasn't a threat on offense, like Lister or Randy Breuer, at mid-court instead of near the basket to keep a shot-blocking center like the Utah Jazz's Mark Eaton away from the basket to make him less of a threat on defense.

This system, known as "Nellie Ball", created a lot of mismatches and enabled Nelson to lead the Bucks to seven straight Central Division championships with over 50 wins in each of those seasons. He earned NBA Coach of the Year honors in 1983 and 1985. For seven straight years, finishing no worse than second best in the Eastern Conference, the Bucks ended up being eliminated in the playoffs by either the Larry Bird-led Boston Celtics or the Julius Erving-led Philadelphia 76ers. After the 1986–87 season, which included some controversy and distraction before Game 4 of the 1987 Eastern Conference Semifinals against the Boston Celtics where Nelson told the local sports media that he didn't expect to be back once the season concluded due to a rift with Bucks owner Herb Kohl, Nelson resigned as head coach of the Bucks. In 11 seasons, Nelson had a 540–344 (.611) record with Milwaukee.

=== Golden State Warriors (1988–1995) ===
In 1986 former Bucks owner, Jim Fitzgerald, purchased the Golden State Warriors. Nelson did part-time work as a color analyst for NBA games on TBS during the 1987–88 season. During the season he was contacted by the Dallas Mavericks, Golden State Warriors, and New York Knicks with offers to coach their teams. Nelson decided to go with Golden State, in large part due to his relationship with Fitzgerald, at first buying a minority stake in the team before being named head coach and vice president after one season away from the NBA.

At Golden State, he instilled a "run-and-gun" style of offense. Again using an unconventional lineup which featured three guards (Mitch Richmond, Tim Hardaway, and Sarunas Marciulionis) and two forwards (Chris Mullin and the 6'8" Rod Higgins at center), he coached the Warriors to a 23-game turnaround of their previous season and back into the playoffs with his lineup popularly known as Run TMC. All three were later elected to the Naismith Memorial Basketball Hall of Fame after their careers. Nelson was named NBA Coach of the Year a third time after the 1991–92 season.

Nelson continued to retool the team, drafting All-Star Latrell Sprewell in 1992. Nelson traded the Warriors' number 3 pick Penny Hardaway to the Orlando Magic for their number one overall pick Chris Webber during the 1993 NBA draft. Despite Webber averaging 17.5 points and 9.1 rebounds per game and winning the 1994 NBA Rookie of the Year Award, he found himself at odds with Nelson's preference to play him at center rather than power forward. Frequently clashing with one another, Webber threatened to use the out-clause in his contract if he wasn't traded. Nelson reportedly offered to resign rather than let the team trade away their young star, but nonetheless Webber was dealt to the Washington Bullets on November 7, 1994, for Tom Gugliotta and three future 1st round draft picks (1996, 1998 and 2000).

Nelson resigned as head coach of the Warriors on February 13, 1995. He made the playoffs with Golden State in four of his six seasons there. Subsequently, the Warriors did not qualify for the playoffs for the next 12 seasons, until he returned to the team in 2006.

=== Team USA: "Dream Team II" (1994) ===
In 1994, Nelson coached the Team USA national basketball team at the 1994 FIBA World Championship in Toronto, and led them to the gold medal. The team was marketed as "Dream Team II".

Coached by Nelson, along with assistants Don Chaney, Pete Gillen, and Rick Majerus, Team USA had a roster of Derrick Coleman, Joe Dumars, Tim Hardaway (injured), Kevin Johnson, Larry Johnson, Shawn Kemp, Dan Majerle, Reggie Miller, Alonzo Mourning, Shaquille O'Neal, Mark Price, Steve Smith, Isiah Thomas (injured), and Dominique Wilkins.

USA went 8–0, defeating Spain 115–100, People's Republic of China 132–77, and Brazil 105–82. In the final round, the U.S. team defeated Australia 130–74, Puerto Rico 134–83, Russia 111–94, and Greece 97–58. In the gold medal game, Team USA defeated Russia 137–91.

Nelson stated, "I really don't know why they chose me, to tell you the truth. But I do know I always wanted to coach a U.S. national team. I didn't really have any conversations with [the league or USA Basketball] in advance of them choosing me. But, heck, it was an honor. It was probably the top experience that I had as a coach. To stand up there and see your flag raised is a special thing."

=== New York Knicks (1995–1996) ===
Nelson was hired by the New York Knicks after their original choice, Chuck Daly, declined their coaching offer. In 1995, Nelson began his stint with the Knicks, which lasted from July 1995 until March 1996. Nelson coached the Knicks to a 34–25 record, but his up-tempo style of offense sharply contrasted the Knicks' defensive style of play. Nelson also suggested the Knicks trade Patrick Ewing so the team could make an offer to Shaquille O'Neal, who was rumored to be interested in a move to New York.

On March 8, 1996, Nelson was fired as head coach by the Knicks. He was replaced by his assistant, Jeff Van Gundy. He had a 34–25 record. New York finished 13–10 with Van Gundy, for an overall record of 47–35.

=== Dallas Mavericks (1997–2005) ===
Nelson was named head coach and general manager of the Dallas Mavericks in 1997. He was coming to a team that had been dormant through the 1990s and a permanent fixture in the NBA lottery. In 1998, his first full off-season in charge, Nelson worked out draft day deals with the Milwaukee Bucks and Phoenix Suns, essentially trading the draft rights of Robert Traylor and Pat Garrity for Dirk Nowitzki and Steve Nash, whom he wanted to pair with the Mavericks rising star Michael Finley.

The trio of Nash, Finley, and Nowitzki became the foundation for the Mavericks dramatic turnaround, as Nelson coached the Mavericks to four consecutive 50-win seasons. The height of their success was a 60-win season in 2002–03, when they reached the Western Conference Finals against the San Antonio Spurs. An injury to Nowitzki in game 3 that kept him out for the rest of the series doomed the Mavericks as they lost in six games.

Lacking an interior presence to combat low-post players such as Shaquille O'Neal, Nelson introduced the "Hack-a-Shaq" defense to the NBA while in Dallas. In the 2004 off-season, Steve Nash was offered a max contract by the Phoenix Suns; despite Nelson's insistence on matching the offer, Mark Cuban declined and Nash accepted Phoenix's offer. Nash won consecutive MVPs with the Suns the following two seasons.

On March 19, 2005, Nelson stepped down as Dallas' head coach, naming Avery Johnson as his successor. Nelson retained his job as Dallas' GM until after the season, when he named his son, assistant GM Donnie Nelson, as his replacement as GM. The Mavericks reached the NBA Finals the following season, though they would lose to the Miami Heat in six games.

Nelson spoke fondly of his time in Dallas, but admitted he lost interest in remaining with the team when they did not re-sign Nash. In eight seasons with Dallas, Nelson had a 339–251 (.575) record.

=== Golden State Warriors, second stint (2006–2010) ===
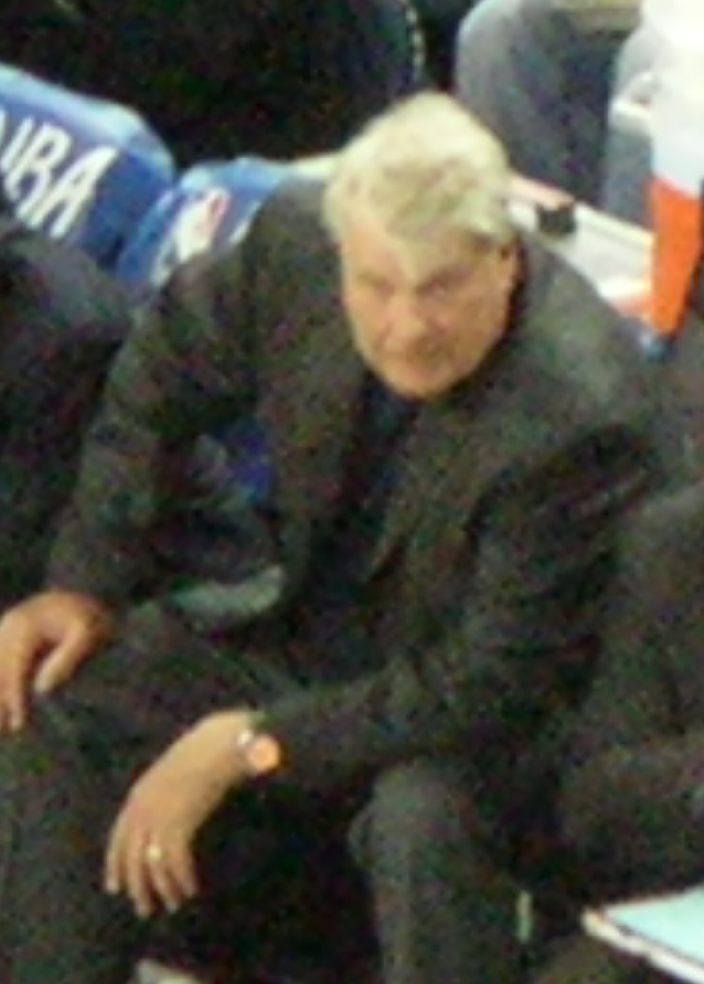
Nelson as the Warriors' head coach in March 2009

On August 29, 2006, Nelson returned to the Golden State Warriors for a second stint as head coach. Chris Mullin, a favorite of Nelson's from his first stint as Warriors head coach, was the team's general manager. Nelson's style of coaching favored the play of Baron Davis, Monta Ellis, Matt Barnes, Jason Richardson, and Andris Biedriņš. Midway through the season, Mullin (at behest of Nelson) orchestrated a trade with the Pacers to obtain Al Harrington and Stephen Jackson.

The new lineup thrived under Nelson; Davis, Biedriņš, and Jackson saw an increase in scoring and efficiency, Barnes went from a virtual unknown to a solid rotation contributor, and Ellis was named the NBA's Most Improved Player after averaging 16.5 points per game, a substantial increase from his average of 6.8 points per game the prior season. The Warriors closed out the season on a 16–5 run and just managed to qualify for the 2007 playoffs.

Nelson faced his former team, the Dallas Mavericks, in the first round of the playoffs. The Mavs had the NBA's best record, and were a top-pick to win the NBA championship that year. In one of the biggest upsets in NBA playoff history, Nelson coached the 8th-seeded Warriors to a series victory over the top-seeded Mavericks in six games. It was numerically the largest upset in the history of the NBA playoffs, with the 67–15 Mavericks' regular-season win–loss record 25 games better than the 42–40 Warriors'. The Warriors went on to lose to the Utah Jazz in the second round. Nelson became the only coach in NBA history to steer three teams to a first round series victory while being seeded either 7th or 8th, having previously coached the Warriors to first-round upsets of the Jazz in 1989 as a 7th seed and the Spurs in 1991 as the 7th seed.

On January 29, 2008, Chris Webber signed with the Warriors, reuniting with Nelson and returning to the team that had drafted him 15 years earlier. His return lasted only nine games as he was forced to retire due to injuries, but his return signaled closure to arguably the biggest blemish on Nelson's otherwise impressive resume as a player's coach. The Warriors finished 48–34 that season, their most wins since 1993–94 (during Nelson's first stint with the team). However, in a tightly contested Western Conference, the Warriors missed the playoffs by two games.

The next two seasons saw the Warriors plunge back into mediocrity (29–53 and 26–56), losing most of the players from their 2007 playoff run to either trades or free agency. The first of his two losing seasons brought the Warriors the seventh overall pick in the 2009 NBA draft, and Nelson pushed the team to draft Stephen Curry, despite skepticism from critics. Curry would go on to win back-to-back MVP awards and helped lead Golden State to championships in 2015, 2017, 2018, and 2022. Curry was also named 2022 NBA Finals MVP.

On September 23, 2010, Nelson announced he would resign as head coach. The San Francisco Chronicle reported that new owners Joe Lacob and Peter Guber wanted "a young, up-and-coming coach" to help revive the Warriors' fortunes. Longtime assistant Keith Smart succeeded Nelson as coach. In February 2011, Nelson said on Bay Area radio station KNBR that he was fired: "I talked to (Lacob) on the phone before I got fired, and I was really impressed. I was a little surprised with the way things happened, but I think it is for the best for everybody."

In 11 total seasons with Golden State, Nelson's teams finished 422–443 (.488). He ended his coaching career with 2398 games and a 1335–1063 (.557) record.

=== NBA coaching record ===
On December 29, 2001, Nelson became the third coach in NBA history to win 1,000 games, behind Lenny Wilkens and Pat Riley. Nelson won his 1,300th career game on February 21, 2009, joining Wilkens as the only coach to pass this milestone. Nelson defeated the Minnesota Timberwolves on April 7, 2010, achieving his 1,333rd career win and passing Lenny Wilkens for first all-time on the list of the NBA's winningest coaches. This would later be surpassed by Gregg Popovich who won his 1,336th game on March 11, 2022. Nelson finished his career with 1,335 regular season victories.

== Personal life ==
Nelson married Joy Wolfgram at the Oakland Coliseum in June 1991. Nelson and his wife have a total of six children from prior marriages. He has a daughter born out of wedlock and put up for adoption whom he did not know about for 29 years and who first reached out to him in 1997, not wanting anything in return. She now lives in Maui near Nelson's widow.

He had fifteen grandchildren as of 2012.

Nelson's son Donnie Nelson was the general manager of the Dallas Mavericks. Donnie was Don's assistant coach with the Mavericks when Don won his 1,000th NBA game on December 29, 2001. Donnie moved from coaching to become the president of basketball operations for the Mavericks in 2002 while his father was still coaching Dallas. Donnie Nelson was an assistant coach for Lithuania in the 1992, 1996, and 2000 Olympics.

He called Dirk Nowitzki his "German son". Nelson coached Nowitzki for his first six NBA seasons in Dallas. "In my second game ever in the NBA -- obviously I wasn't a defensive presence -- he wanted me out there in the game but he didn't have anybody for me to guard," recalled the 7'0" Nowitzki. "So he let me guard [5-foot-3] Muggsy Bogues for a couple possessions. He said, 'Just stand there in the paint and wave at him. He doesn't want to shoot.'"

During the summers, while a player and when he became an NBA coach, Nelson would continually work with his Rock Island High School coach Bob Riley at a basketball camp and the two would play golf afterwards. Riley died in 2009. "He always made sure he checked in on my dad," said Bob's son Jack Riley.

Nelson had a hand in the Celtics drafting teammate Steve Kuberski. While with the Celtics, Nelson would return home to the Quad Cities and played with Kuberski, then at Bradley University, at the Moline YMCA. Kuberski was from Moline, Illinois, and had played at Moline High School, a Western Big 6 rival of Nelson's alma mater Rock Island High School. "We were just playing one-on-one but he went back to Boston and said they should take a look at this kid when his class comes up," Kuberski said of Nelson's influence. "They drafted me on whim a year early."

After his playing career ended, Nelson refereed basketball games in the summer league, thinking that becoming a referee might be his next career. "I never thought about coaching. I always wondered what in the world I'm going to do when I retire. That's why I tried refereeing", Nelson said. "He sucked as a referee, according to what he tells me", said Nelson's former teammate Joel Novak, who played with Nelson at both Rock Island High School and the University of Iowa. Nelson credited a lot of Novak'rebounds with his having missed many shots.

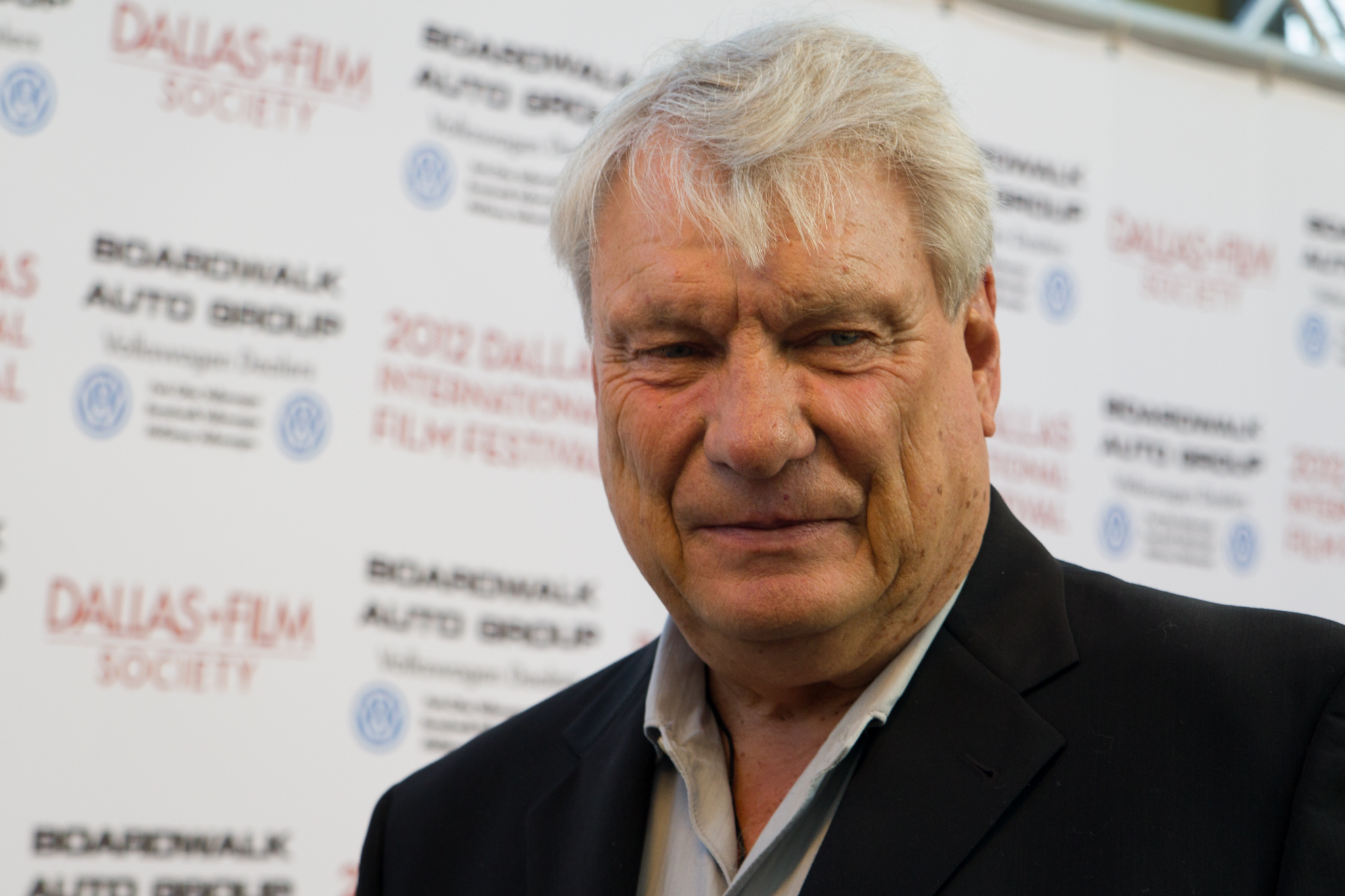
Nelson at the Dallas International Film Festival in 2012

During the 1986 season, Nelson established The Don Nelson Fund with the help of the Milwaukee Bucks to aid struggling farmers in Wisconsin. The idea originated from Wisconsin dairy farmer Clarence Willcome, to whom Nelson donated his $11,000 1986 NBA Playoffs bonus compensation. Nelson headed a weight loss drive to raise more money for Willcome and the Wisconsin Farm Fund.

He had prostate cancer surgery in 2000.

Nelson graduated from the University of Iowa with a degree in physical education in 2012. He left Iowa in 1962 with his degree coursework nearly completed. He later took Spanish classes to fulfill some of his missing 8 foreign language credit hours. He still lacked student-teaching credits. When Nelson called the university, after being inspired by Shaquille O'Neal to finish his degree, Iowa decided that his lifetime of teaching through NBA coaching would fulfill that requirement and invited him to the graduation ceremony in 2012. He attended and received his diploma with over 45 family members and friends accompanying him.

As of April 2018, Nelson lived in Maui, where he had a farm to grow flowers, coffee, and cannabis. He hosted local poker games with celebrities such as Willie Nelson, Woody Harrelson, and Owen Wilson.

"I know how far I've come from being a hog farmer," Nelson said of his career. "I've come a long, long way from being some country kid. I got in the fast lane, and I've stayed there a long time. I've done pretty well."

"All I can tell you is he's happy. He's in Maui, drinking Mai Tais and watching sunsets and whales. Life's good," said his son Donnie.

In early 2026, Nelson moved from Maui to Frisco, Texas. On August 9, 2026, Nelson died at the age of 86. The Dallas Morning News reported that he had suffered a stroke three weeks prior, and had been admitted to hospice.

== Honors ==
Nelson's Celtics No. 19 was retired in 1978

- In 1973, Nelson was inducted into the Illinois Basketball Coaches Association Hall of Fame as a player.
- Nelson's No. 19 jersey was retired by the Boston Celtics in 1978.
- Nelson was inducted into the Des Moines Sunday Register's Iowa Sports Hall of Fame in 1983.
- In 1987, Nelson was inducted into the Quad City Sports Hall of Fame.
- Nelson was inducted into the University of Iowa Athletics Hall of Fame in 1989.
- In 2012, Nelson was inducted into the Naismith Memorial Basketball Hall of Fame.

== NBA career statistics ==
Legend
GP	Games played	GS	Games started	MPG	Minutes per game
FG%	Field goal percentage	3P%	3-point field goal percentage	FT%	Free throw percentage
RPG	Rebounds per game	APG	Assists per game	SPG	Steals per game
BPG	Blocks per game	PPG	Points per game	**Bold**	Career high
†	Won an NBA championship	*	Led the league

=== Regular season ===
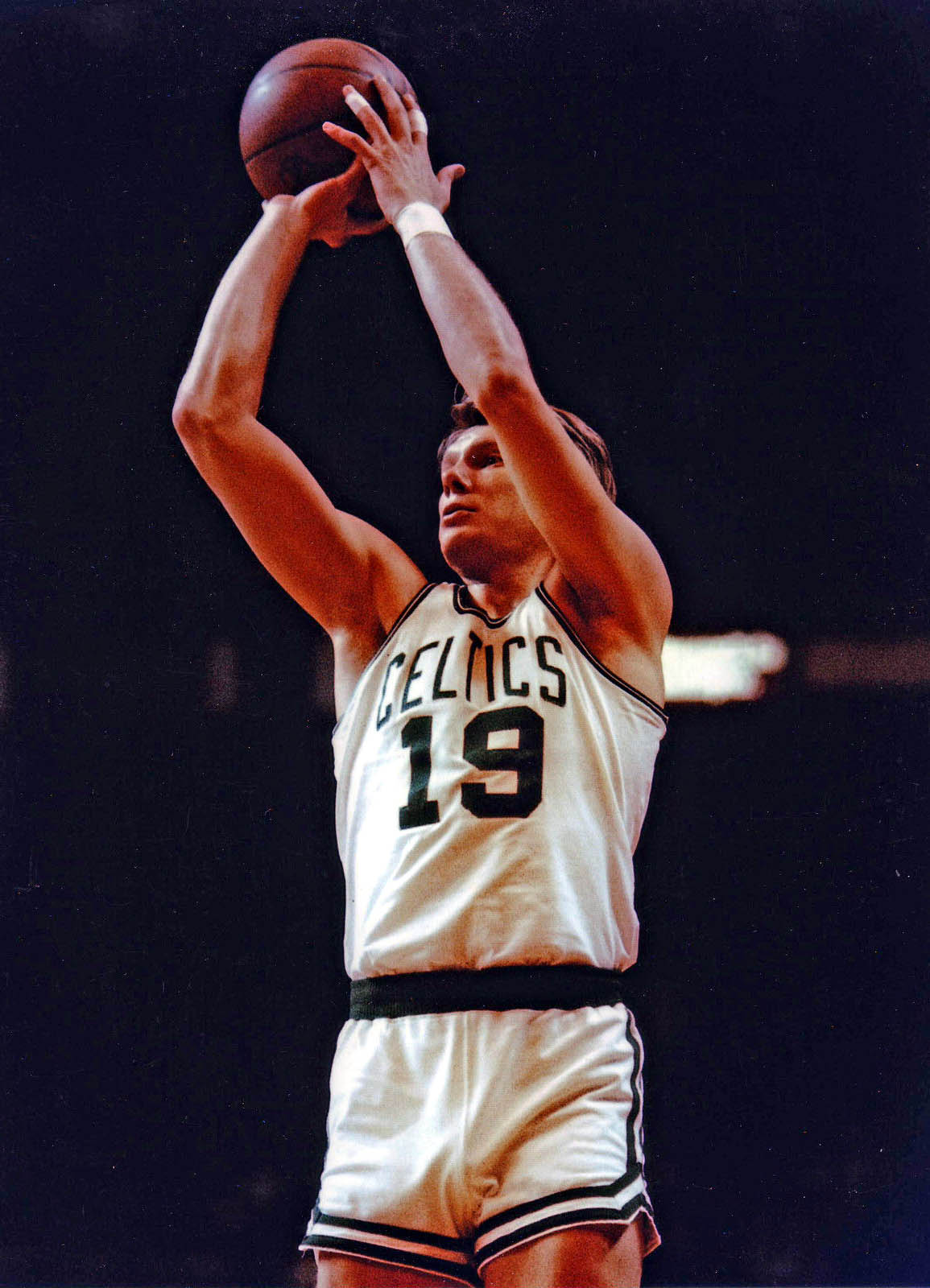

Year	Team	GP	MPG	FG%	FT%	RPG	APG	STL	BLK	PPG
1962–63	Chicago	62	17.3	.440	.729	4.5	1.2	–	–	6.8
1963–64	L.A. Lakers	80	17.6	.418	.741	4.0	1.0	–	–	5.2
1964–65	L.A. Lakers	39	6.1	.424	.769	1.9	0.6	–	–	2.4
1965–66†	Boston	75	23.5	.439	.684	5.4	1.1	–	–	10.2
1966–67	Boston	79	15.2	.446	.742	3.7	0.8	–	–	7.5
1967–68†	Boston	**82**	18.3	.494	.728	5.3	1.3	–	–	10.0
1968–69†	Boston	**82**	21.6	.485	.776	5.6	1.1	–	–	11.6
1969–70	Boston	**82**	27.1	.501	.775	**7.3**	1.8	–	–	**15.4**
1970–71	Boston	**82**	**27.5**	.468	.744	6.9	1.9	–	–	13.9
1971–72	Boston	**82**	25.4	.480	.788	5.5	**2.3**	–	–	13.8
1972–73	Boston	72	19.8	.476	**.846**	4.4	1.4	–	–	10.8
1973–74†	Boston	**82**	21.3	.508	.788	4.2	2.0	0.2	**0.2**	11.5
1974–75	Boston	79	26.0	**.539***	.827	5.9	**2.3**	**0.4**	**0.2**	14.0
1975‍–‍76†	Boston	75	12.6	.462	.789	2.4	1.0	0.2	0.1	6.4
Career		1053	20.6	.480	.765	4.9	1.4	0.3	0.1	10.3

=== Playoffs ===
Year	Team	GP	MPG	FG%	FT%	RPG	APG	STL	BLK	PPG
1964	L.A. Lakers	5	11.2	.538	**1.000**	2.6	0.4	–	–	3.4
1965	L.A. Lakers	11	19.3	.453	.760	5.4	1.7	–	–	6.1
1966†	Boston	17	18.6	.424	.808	5.0	0.8	–	–	8.4
1967	Boston	9	15.8	.458	.588	4.7	1.0	–	–	7.1
1968†	Boston	**19**	24.6	.520	.743	**7.5**	1.7	–	–	12.5
1969†	Boston	18	19.3	.518	.833	4.6	1.2	–	–	12.4
1972	Boston	11	**28.0**	.525	.854	5.5	1.9	–	–	13.2
1973	Boston	13	23.3	.465	.875	2.9	1.2	–	–	11.0
1974†	Boston	18	25.9	.500	.774	5.4	1.9	**0.4**	**0.2**	11.4
1975	Boston	11	24.9	**.564**	.902	4.1	**2.4**	0.2	**0.2**	**15.4**
1976†	Boston	18	17.5	.481	.870	2.9	0.9	0.2	0.1	9.1
Career		150	21.4	.498	.817	4.8	1.4	0.3	0.1	10.5

== Head coaching record ==
Legend
Regular season	G	Games coached	W	Games won	L	Games lost	W–L %	Win–loss %
Playoffs	PG	Playoff games	PW	Playoff wins	PL	Playoff losses	PW–L %	Playoff win–loss %

Team	Year	G	W	L	W–L%	Finish	PG	PW	PL	PW–L%	Result
Milwaukee	1976–77	64	27	37	.422	6th in Midwest	—	—	—	—	Missed Playoffs
Milwaukee	1977–78	82	44	38	.537	2nd in Midwest	9	5	4	.556	Lost in Conf. Semifinals
Milwaukee	1978–79	82	38	44	.463	4th in Midwest	—	—	—	—	Missed Playoffs
Milwaukee	1979–80	82	49	33	.598	1st in Midwest	7	3	4	.429	Lost in Conf. Semifinals
Milwaukee	1980–81	82	60	22	.732	1st in Central	7	3	4	.429	Lost in Conf. Semifinals
Milwaukee	1981–82	82	55	27	.671	1st in Central	6	2	4	.333	Lost in Conf. Semifinals
Milwaukee	1982–83	82	51	31	.622	1st in Central	9	5	4	.556	Lost in Conf. Finals
Milwaukee	1983–84	82	50	32	.610	1st in Central	16	8	8	.500	Lost in Conf. Finals
Milwaukee	1984–85	82	59	23	.720	1st in Central	8	3	5	.375	Lost in Conf. Semifinals
Milwaukee	1985–86	82	57	25	.695	1st in Central	14	7	7	.500	Lost in Conf. Finals
Milwaukee	1986–87	82	50	32	.610	3rd in Central	12	6	6	.500	Lost in Conf. Semifinals
Golden State	1988–89	82	43	39	.524	4th in Pacific	8	4	4	.500	Lost in Conf. Semifinals
Golden State	1989–90	82	37	45	.451	5th in Pacific	—	—	—	—	Missed Playoffs
Golden State	1990–91	82	44	38	.537	4th in Pacific	9	4	5	.444	Lost in Conf. Semifinals
Golden State	1991–92	82	55	27	.671	2nd in Pacific	4	1	3	.250	Lost in First Round
Golden State	1992–93	82	34	48	.415	6th in Pacific	—	—	—	—	Missed Playoffs
Golden State	1993–94	82	50	32	.610	3rd in Pacific	3	0	3	.000	Lost in First Round
Golden State	1994–95	45	14	31	.311	(resigned)	—	—	—	—	—
New York	1995–96	59	34	25	.576	(fired)	—	—	—	—	—
Dallas	1997–98	66	16	50	.242	5th in Midwest	—	—	—	—	Missed Playoffs
Dallas	1998–99	50	19	31	.380	5th in Midwest	—	—	—	—	Missed Playoffs
Dallas	1999–00	82	40	42	.488	4th in Midwest	—	—	—	—	Missed Playoffs
Dallas	2000–01	82	53	29	.646	2nd in Midwest	10	4	6	.400	Lost in Conf. Semifinals
Dallas	2001–02	82	57	25	.695	2nd in Midwest	8	4	4	.500	Lost in Conf. Semifinals
Dallas	2002–03	82	60	22	.732	1st in Midwest	20	10	10	.500	Lost in Conf. Finals
Dallas	2003–04	82	52	30	.634	3rd in Midwest	5	1	4	.200	Lost in First Round
Dallas	2004–05	64	42	22	.656	(resigned)	—	—	—	—	—
Golden State	2006–07	82	42	40	.512	3rd in Pacific	11	5	6	.455	Lost in Conf. Semifinals
Golden State	2007–08	82	48	34	.585	3rd in Pacific	—	—	—	—	Missed Playoffs
Golden State	2008–09	82	29	53	.354	3rd in Pacific	—	—	—	—	Missed Playoffs
Golden State	2009–10	82	26	56	.317	4th in Pacific	—	—	—	—	Missed Playoffs
Career		2,398	1,335	1,063	.557		166	75	91	.452	
