= Point forward =

Basketball position

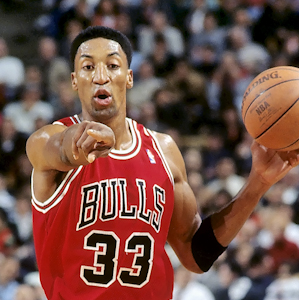
Scottie Pippen is often credited with popularizing the point forward in basketball. Pippen often used his athleticism and size as a mismatch on smaller guards while bringing the ball up the court. Pippen's guard-like passing ability also proved effective in facilitating the ball to teammates.

Point forward is an unorthodox offensive position in basketball in which a forward, usually a small forward, adds the responsibilities of a point guard to their play. More rarely, a power forward can also assume the position. The purpose of the point forward role is to create mismatches offensively on smaller defenders who are usually guards. Point forwards need to have proficient guard skills, such as court vision, basketball IQ, passing, and ball handling in order to play the role effectively on offense.

Notable examples of point forwards in the National Basketball Association (NBA) include LeBron James, Scottie Pippen, Boris Diaw, and Hedo Türkoğlu.

== Characteristics ==
Generally, teams employ a point forward when their best playmaker is a forward rather than a guard. A point forward is typically responsible for bringing the ball up the court and being the primary facilitator on offense to generate assists, but they may merely direct play once a guard brings the ball up-court.

Assuming the role of point forward may cut down on that player's scoring, as distributing the ball to others decreases shot attempts. Basketball Hall of Fame small forward Larry Bird, a prolific scorer with exceptional passing skills, quipped "I'm a point forward now" after his coaches sought him to score less and pass more.

Don Nelson, a coach often associated with the point forward in his Nellie Ball system, used the role when his guards were not strong ball-handlers. Other coaches have used point forwards to free their guards to score more, a strategy of increasing importance as the three-point shot has become the sport's primary offensive weapon.

ESPN analyst Dave Telep maintained a point forward needed to be more than merely an adept passer but also had to facilitate the offense for teammates at least half of the time.

== Etymology ==
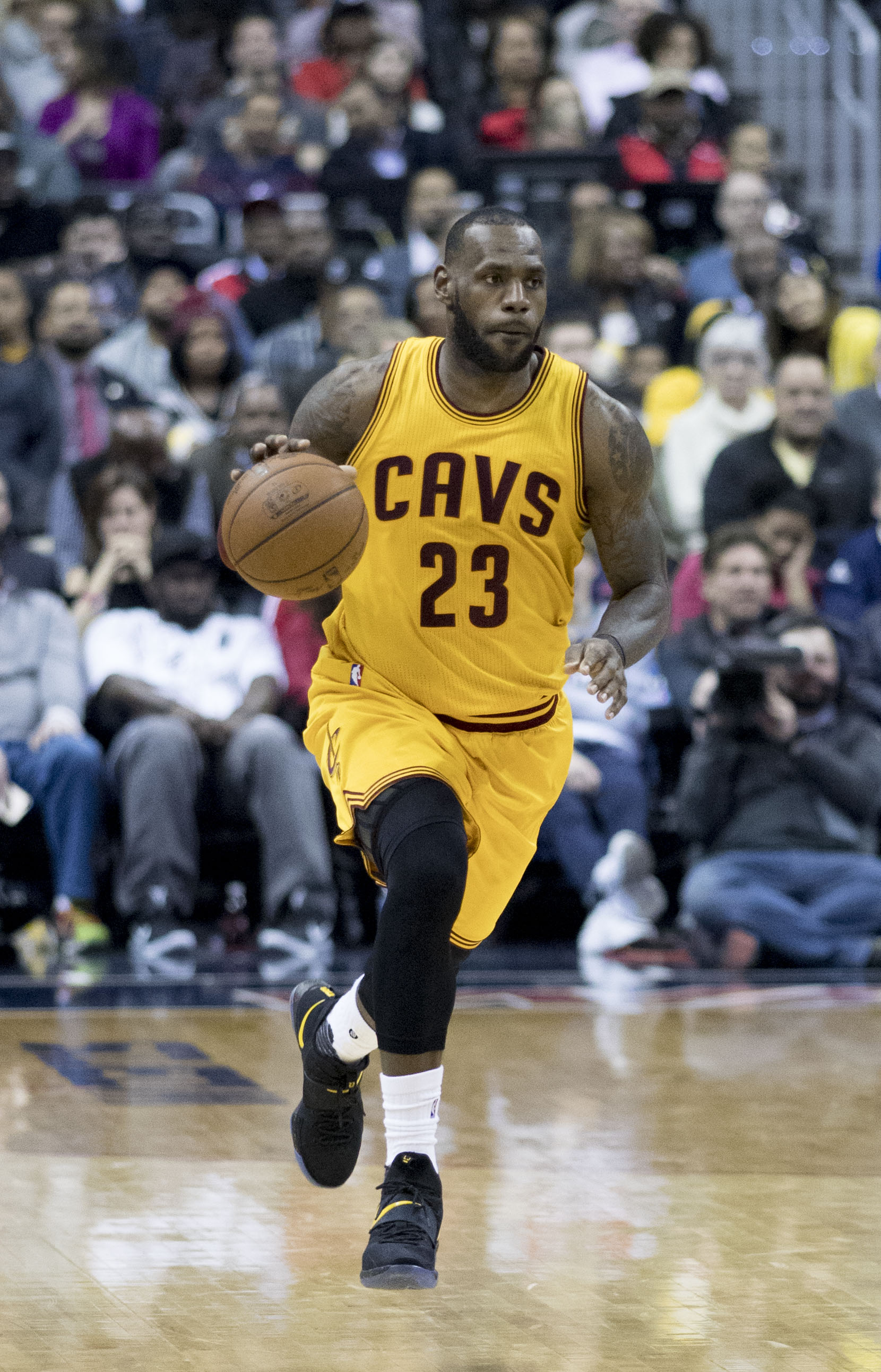
LeBron James often plays a point forward role, alternating from handling the ball similarly to a point guard on offense to then playing defense on opposing forwards.

The origin of the term point forward is cloudy. Two former members of the NBA's Milwaukee Bucks claim to have coined it: Bucks small forward Marques Johnson maintains he created it during the 1984 playoffs when the team became short on point guards after Nate Archibald was sidelined with a hamstring injury. When coach Don Nelson instructed Johnson to run the offense he says he responded, "OK, so instead of a point guard, I'm a point forward". Then-Bucks assistant coach Del Harris claims he first mentioned the term to Nelson while discussing how to best use Paul Pressey. Harris says he came up with the term while coaching Robert Reid with the Houston Rockets. Harris credits his predecessor as Rockets coach Tom Nissalke's use of small forward Rick Barry as originating the point forward position.

== History ==
Historically, one of the first to fill the role was John Johnson, who played it for the 1970s Seattle SuperSonics alongside two scoring-minded guards, Gus Williams and Dennis Johnson. Also, starting with the 1973-74 season, the Golden State Warriors used 6'8" Rick Barry quite often to facilitate the offense alongside such guards as Butch Beard, Jeff Mullins and Phil Smith. During the 1980s Milwaukee Bucks Marques Johnson and Paul Pressey played point forward under coach Don Nelson. Larry Bird, a 6'9" small forward who excelled at both scoring and rebounding in that position was also an exceptional passer and facilitator of others on offense. In the flow of games, he often played a point forward role for the great Boston Celtics teams of the 1980s; the 6'9" Earvin "Magic" Johnson, who orchestrated the Los Angeles Lakers' offense in the 1980s as the team's point guard, moved to a point forward role upon returning 27 pounds (12 kg) heavier after his HIV announcement.

Scottie Pippen who played with Michael Jordan on the Chicago Bulls is one further example of a modern point-forward. He was the team's small forward, but he played point-guard in high school and brought the ball up the floor against the press in college. On the day he was drafted, Pippen can be quoted during his interview "Going in, I'm looking to play probably the 3 position but some day I'm looking to work my way in to the point guard position". Bulls teammate Dennis Rodman noted "Pippen is most probably the innovator of the power/point forward position." Pippen could also defend point guards.

== See also ==
- Tweener
