= Run TMC =

Basketball trio

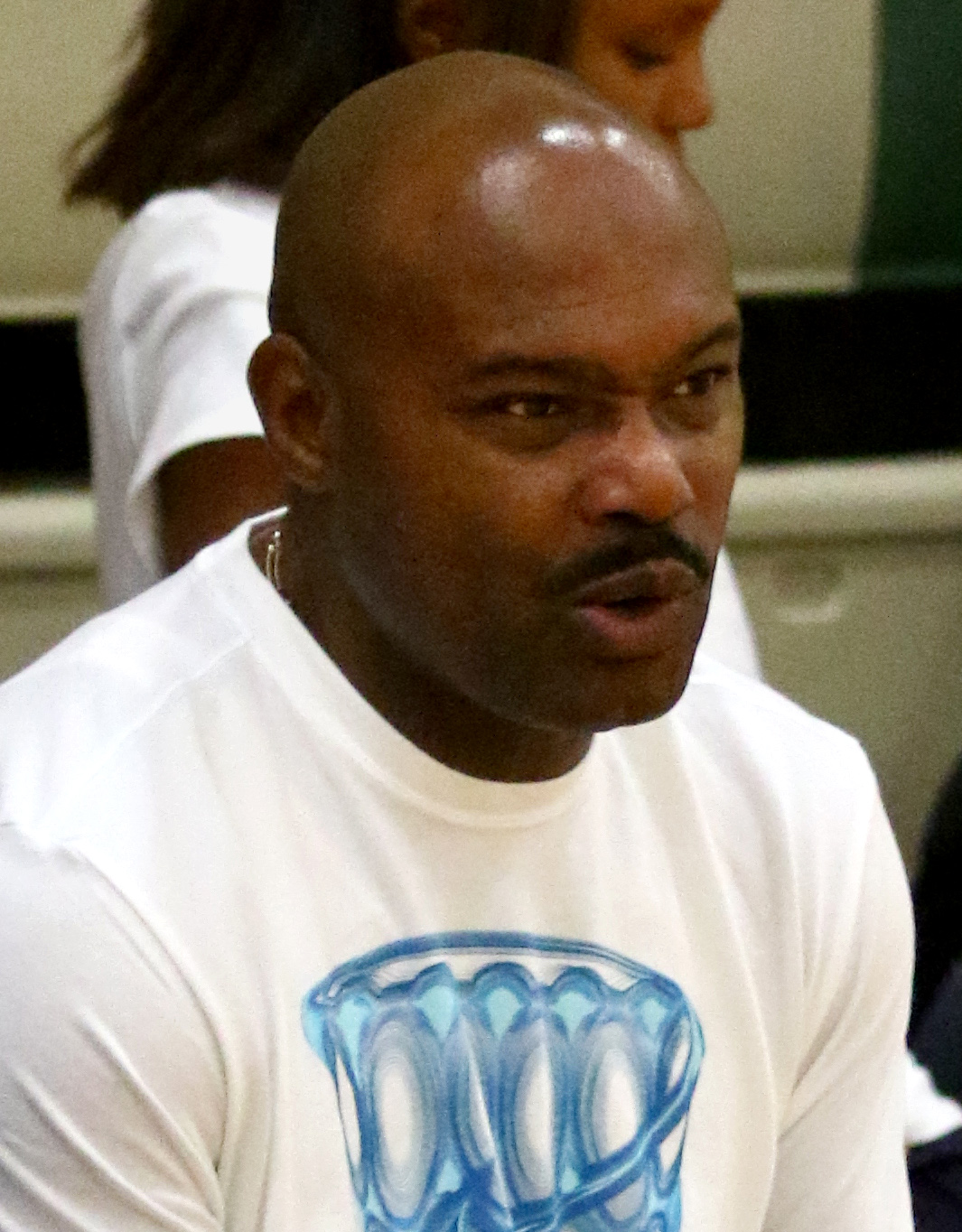
Tim Hardaway

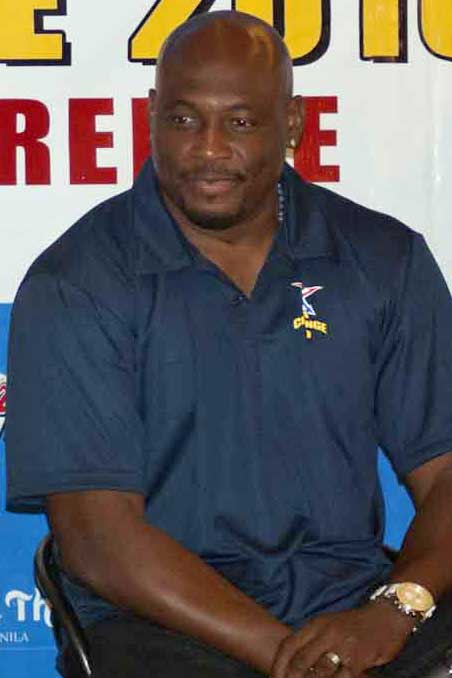
Mitch Richmond

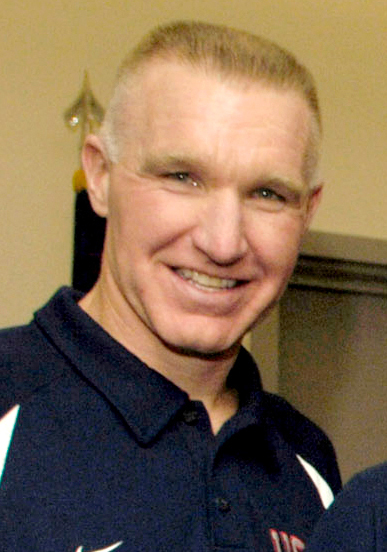
Chris Mullin

Run TMC was the high-scoring trio of Hall of Fame basketball teammates consisting of Tim Hardaway, Mitch Richmond and Chris Mullin. Starting in 1989, they played together for two seasons with the Golden State Warriors in the National Basketball Association (NBA). Coached by Don Nelson, who was also inducted into the Hall of Fame, the Warriors played a fast-paced, run-and-gun style, and Run TMC was the league's highest-scoring trio in the 1990–91 season. Despite their short time together, the popularity of Run TMC endured. Their name was a play on the hip hop group Run-DMC, with the first name initials of each member forming TMC.

== History ==
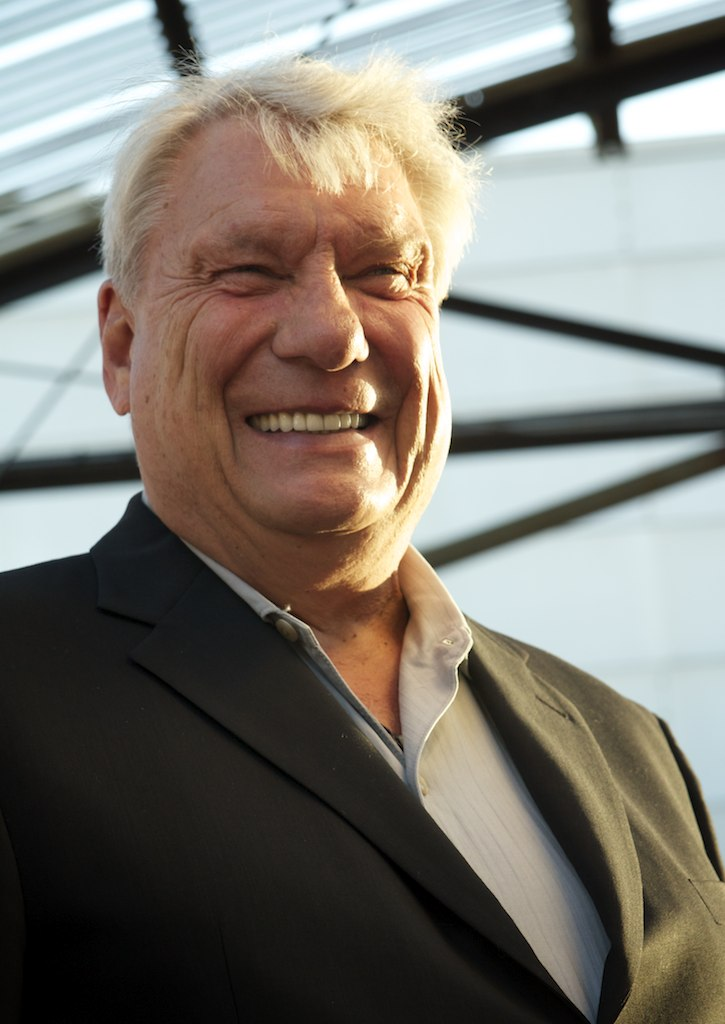
Run TMC thrived under coach Don Nelson.

Mullin was selected by the Warriors with the seventh overall pick in the 1985 NBA draft, Richmond was drafted fifth overall by Golden State in 1988, and Hardaway was taken in the first round in 1989 with the 14th overall selection. They were the core of the Warriors' uptempo offense, known as "Nellie Ball" after their coach Don Nelson. Nelson was a Warriors vice president in 1987–88 before becoming their coach and general manager starting in 1988–89.

The Warriors led the NBA in scoring in 1989–90 in Run TMC's first season. Early on, the rookie Hardaway was not as proficient a scorer as Mullin and Richmond. In a win over the Boston Celtics in the 38th game of the season, all three players surpassed 20 points in the same game for the first time. In their two seasons together, they accomplished the feat 48 times, going 30–18 in those games.

The Warriors sold out every home game in 1990–91. In the season opener, they defeated the Denver Nuggets 162–158, the highest-scoring regulation game in NBA history. Despite their scoring prowess, the Warriors were limited defensively. On February 26, 1991, they lost 131–119 to the Orlando Magic despite the trio each scoring more than 30 points (the rest of the team totaled 21 points). Golden State finished the season 44–38, their best record in nine years, and finished second in the league in scoring (116.6). Mullin finishing eighth in scoring (25.7), Richmond 10th (23.9), and Hardaway 11th (22.9), averaging 72.5 points as the league's highest-scoring trio. Their combined scoring average was the second highest in NBA history for a 20-point trio, (Note: Surpassed in the three seasons from 2016 though 2019 by the Warriors trio of Stephen Curry, Klay Thompson and Kevin Durant with combined averages of 72.7, 72.8 and 74.8.) surpassed only by the 76.7 by Denver's Alex English (28.4), Kiki Vandeweghe (26.7), and Dan Issel (21.6) in 1982–83. (Note: There have been higher scoring trios than Denver's if the 20-point player restriction is removed, including the Los Angeles Lakers high-scoring duo of Elgin Baylor and Jerry West along with a third average scorer, or a very high scorer like the Warriors' Wilt Chamberlain (record 50.4 per game in 1961–62) along with two normal scorers.) The Warriors advanced to the playoffs, upsetting David Robinson and the San Antonio Spurs before losing to the Los Angeles Lakers.

On November 1, 1991, Run TMC was broken up when Golden State traded Richmond and Les Jepsen to the Sacramento Kings for 6-foot-9-inch (2.06 m) rookie Billy Owens, whose additional height compared to Richmond was the size that Nelson believed would complete the team. Nelson said he "was under pressure to get [the team] bigger" to improve the Warriors from a good team to a great one. In the trio's two seasons together, the Warriors had a cumulative record of 81–83, never finished higher than fourth place in the Pacific Division, and won one of two playoff series. "I'd never make that trade again," Nelson lamented.

== Nickname ==
Hardaway, Richmond, and Mullin began the 1990–91 season being called the "Big Three". Midway through the season, The San Francisco Examiner sponsored a "Name the Warriors Trio Contest." Over 1,500 entries were received in two weeks. The newspaper pared it down to the 50 best before presenting them to the players, who selected "Run TMC" over the other two finalists, "The Marks Brothers" and "Three-Mendous". Six entrants had entered "Run TMC", with musician Peter Elman declared the contest's winner in a drawing. The name was a reference to hip hop group Run-DMC. "Run DMC was one of the first rap groups that most people really took notice of ... We definitely liked that nickname," remembered Richmond. Former Laker Sam Perkins recalled that the Warriors even had Run–DMC perform at one of the Warriors–Lakers playoff games that season.

== Aftermath ==
Richmond was a six-time All-Star with Sacramento, and the Kings retired his number in 2003. Owens never provided his expected impact and played only three seasons with Golden State. They won 55 games and finished in 2nd place, two games behind the Portland Trail Blazers in 1992, but lost in the first round of the playoffs. In 1996, Hardaway was traded to the Miami Heat, and the Warriors dealt Mullin the following year to the Indiana Pacers.

All three enjoyed successful careers after the breakup. Mullin and Hardaway came close to winning an NBA championship, while Richmond won one with the Los Angeles Lakers in 2002, albeit with limited playing time.

== Legacy ==
Mullin was inducted into the Naismith Memorial Basketball Hall of Fame in 2011. He acknowledged that his career "took off" when Richmond and Hardaway arrived with Warriors. Nelson was inducted the following year. In 2014, Richmond was also voted in, while Hardaway was admitted as part of the Hall's class of 2022.

Run TMC's short time together belied their enduring popularity. "It was only [a couple of] years, but it seemed longer," Mullin said. The Boston Globe in 2007 wrote the trio had "probably the best nickname" ever. As of 2013, Run TMC T-shirts were still available for sale online. Online tributes are authored by bloggers who were too young to have seen them play, and YouTube is filled with their highlights. NBA.com in 2011 attributed Run TMC's popularity to "romanticism of a loyal fan base that hasn't had much to cheer about." The New York Times opined that their enduring nature "will likely remain a mystery."

The Warriors gave away promotional Run TMC bobbleheads in 2012, with Mullin's likeness being handed out in conjunction with his number being retired by the Warriors. Mullin thought that Hardaway and Richmond should have had their numbers retired at the same time. "To me, it doesn't always have to be about one person. I know I'd feel more comfortable. That would feel natural to me." Mullin said. He called his time with Hardaway and Richmond "the most fun I had playing basketball in my whole life."
