= Three-point revolution =

Strategic shift in NBA basketball

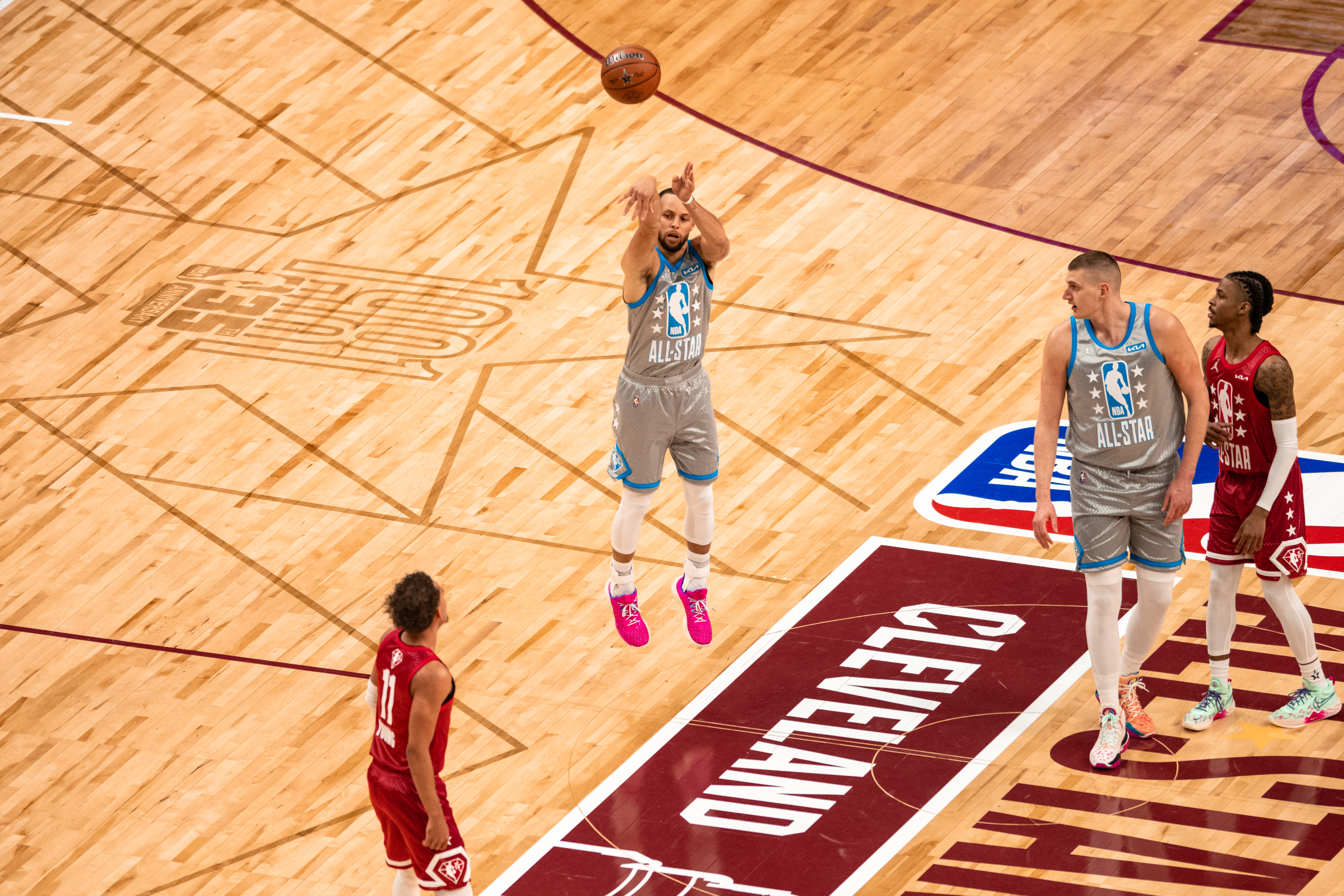
Stephen Curry shooting from the half-court line at the 2022 NBA All-Star Game

In basketball, the three-point revolution or the 3-point revolution is the rapid strategic growth of National Basketball Association (NBA) offenses towards attempting three-point field goals, beginning in the mid-2010s and progressing to the present day. After the introduction of the three point line to the NBA in 1979, NBA teams averaged 2.8 attempts per game. By the 2018–19 season, NBA teams averaged 32.0 attempts per game. Basketball figureheads such as Stephen Curry, Klay Thompson, Steve Kerr, James Harden, Daryl Morey and Mike D'Antoni are all credited with helping precipitate and implement the NBA Three-Point Revolution.

== Background and early history ==
Prior to the three-point revolution, NBA teams, players, coaches and executives had mixed beliefs on the value of the three-point field goal. The three-point line was initially created for the American Basketball Association (ABA), a rival league to the NBA, which emphasized creativity, showmanship and entertainment during play. Three years after the ABA–NBA merger in 1976, the NBA implemented the three-point line. Players, coaches and executives in the NBA at the time viewed it as a gimmick adopted from the comparatively immature ABA. However, over the next four decades, a number of players and coaches realized the value of the three-point shot as they experimented with it as an integral part of their offense.

== 7-seconds-or-less Phoenix Suns (2004–2008) ==
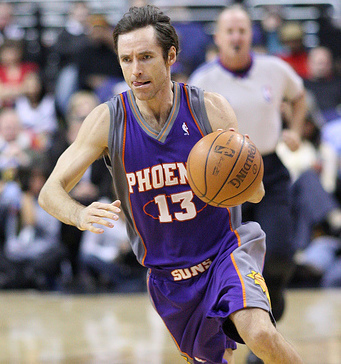
Steve Nash in 2007

While NBA teams in the 1980s and 1990s had experimented with increased three-point field goal attempts, to mixed results, the 2004–2008 Phoenix Suns were one of the first teams to achieve regular season and postseason success utilizing the three-point field goal as a central feature of their offense. Under the leadership of head coach Mike D'Antoni and point guard Steve Nash, the Suns ran a motion offense that encouraged players to shoot a field goal attempt within the first seven seconds of the 24-second shot clock. From 2004 to 2007, the team led the NBA in three-point field goal attempts (3PA) and efficiency, with 24.7 per game on 39.3% efficiency during 2004–05 NBA season, 25.6 3PA per game on 39.9% efficiency during the 2005–06 NBA season, and 24.0 3PA per game on 39.9% efficiency during the 2006–07 NBA season.

From 2004 to 2007, the Phoenix Suns averaged a league-best 58 wins, tying a then-franchise record with 62 wins in the 2004-05 NBA season. Nash won consecutive NBA MVP awards in the 2004–05 and 2005-06 NBA seasons. Meanwhile, D'Antoni was named the 2004–05 NBA Coach of the Year. From 2004 to 2008, league average 3PA per game increased from 15.8 to 18.1, and three-point field goal efficiency (3P%) increased from 34.7% to 36.7%. Steve Kerr was hired as the Suns' general manager in 2008, and remained until 2010.

== Golden State Warriors ==
=== 2010s: The Stephen Curry effect ===
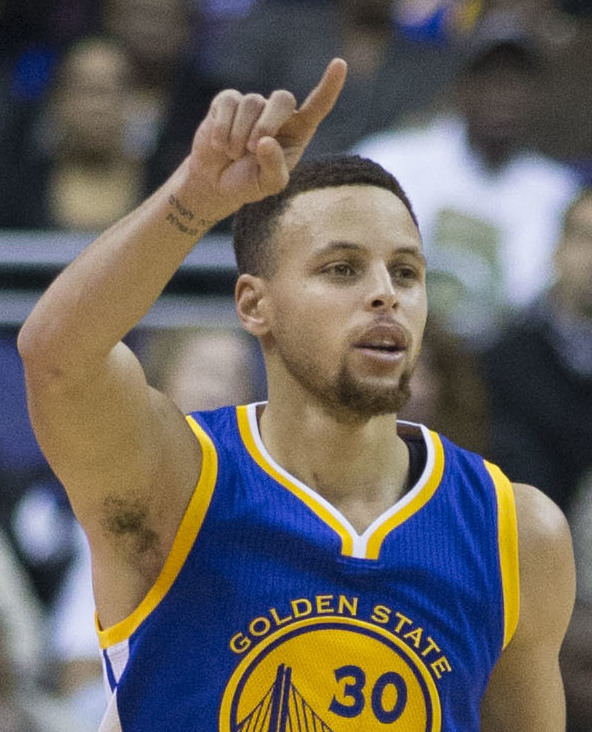
Stephen Curry

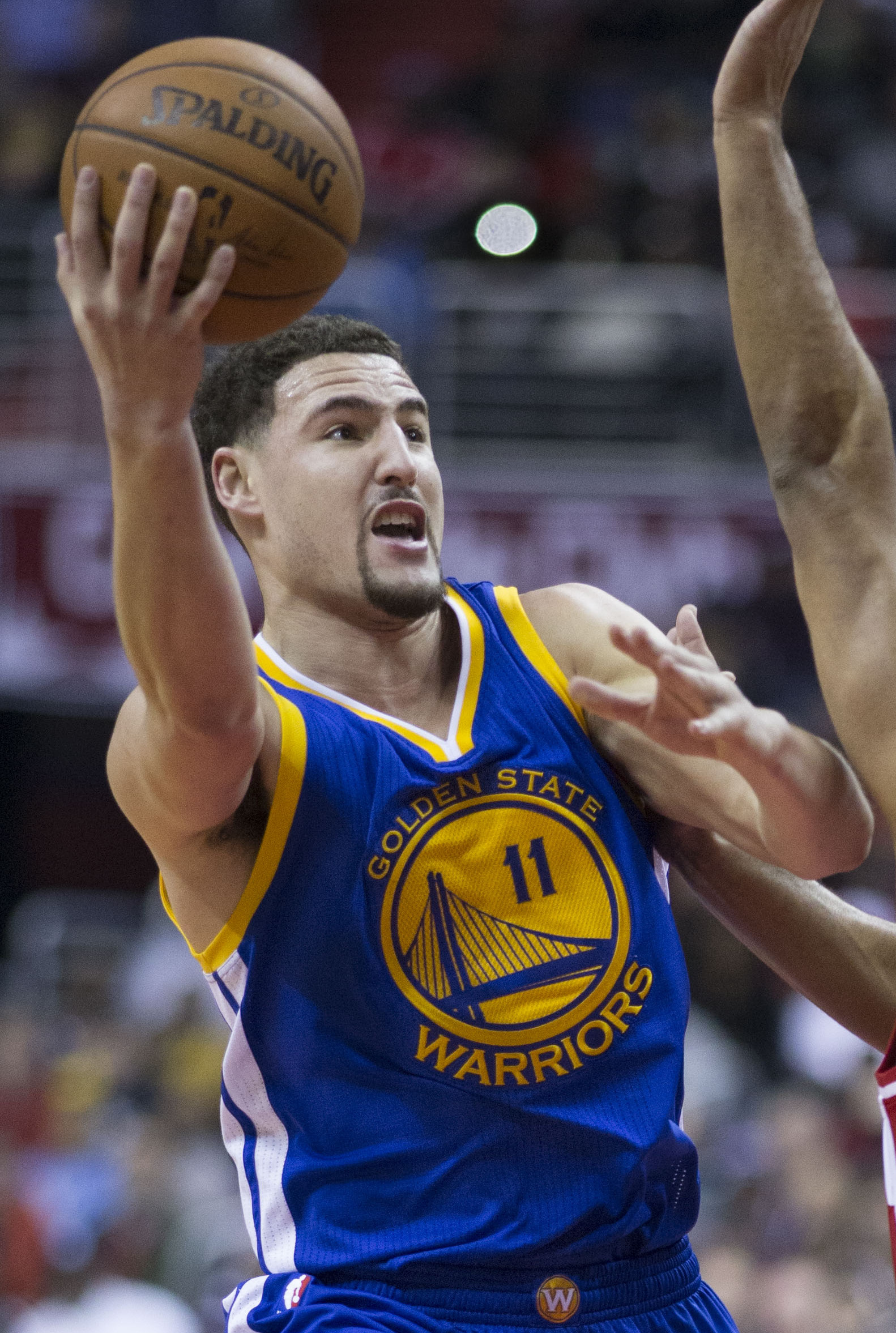
Klay Thompson

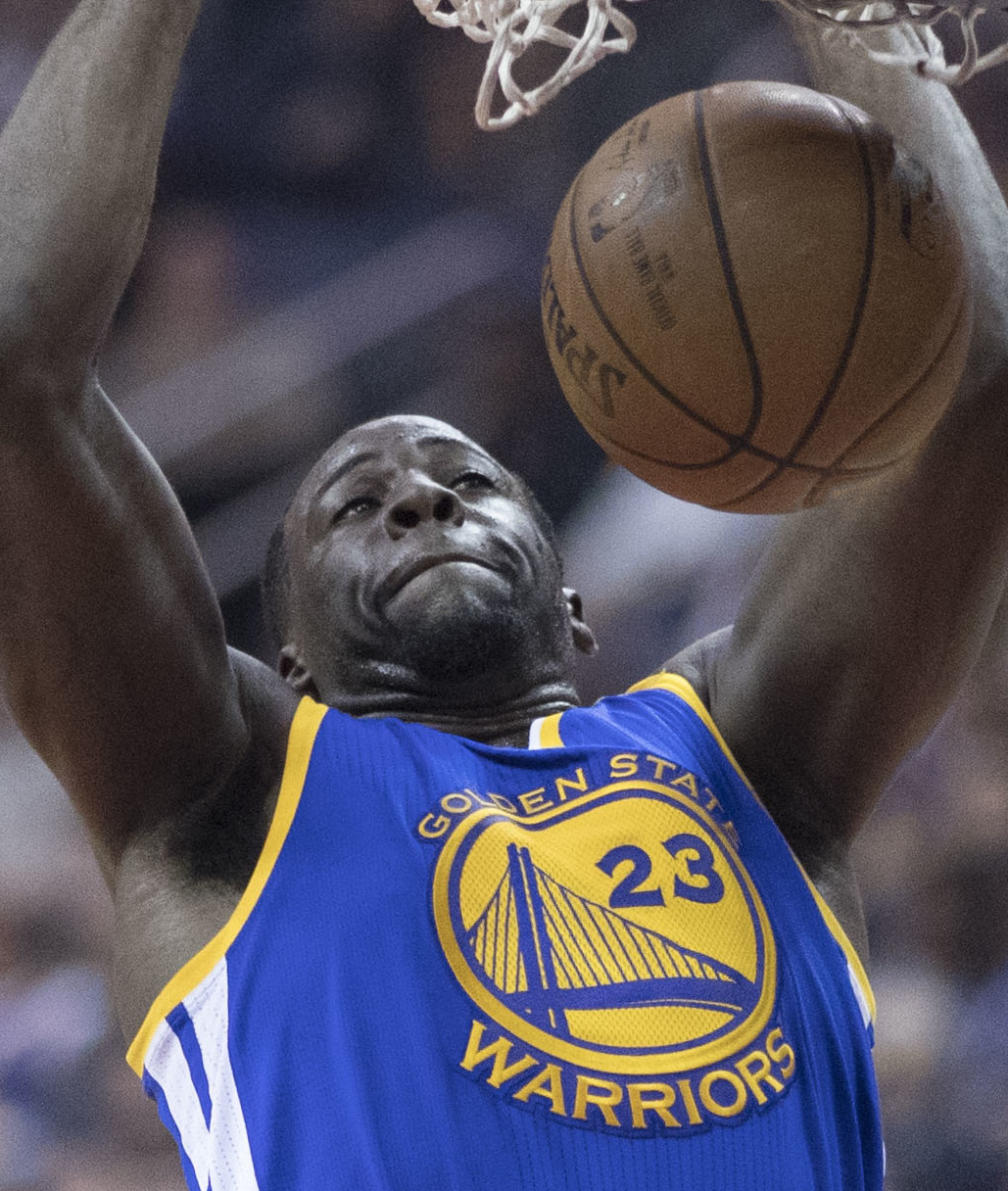
Draymond Green

Point guard Stephen Curry and the Golden State Warriors are largely credited as the pioneers of the three point revolution. Drafted by the Golden State Warriors in the 2009 NBA Draft, 7th overall, Curry was considered the best three-point shooter in his draft class, and by the end of the 2012–13 season, was considered one of the best three point shooters in NBA history, when he broke the record for three-point field goals made in a single season with 272. Golden State's plays have all sought to leverage the shooting ability of Curry into team success.

In 2011, Golden State reaffirmed their prioritization of the three-point shot by drafting shooting guard Klay Thompson 11th overall in the 2011 NBA Draft. Like Curry, Thompson was also regarded as the best three-point shooter in his draft class. His shooting ability created space for offense from Curry and others, as opposing defenses were forced to stay attached to both Thompson and Curry, to avoid giving up an open three-point shot from either of the guards. Thompson also excelled as a perimeter defender, preventing opposing players from creating open three-point shots for themselves and others.

A year later, the Golden State Warriors drafted another complementary player in the 2012 NBA Draft in forward Draymond Green. Drafted 35th overall, Green was not considered a three-point shooter, but added immense value on both sides of the court. Offensively, Green's basketball intelligence meant he was responsible for passing the ball in the Warriors' halfcourt offense, misdirecting defenses to create open three-point opportunities for Curry and Thompson. At 6'6, 230 lbs, Green was strong enough to guard larger forwards and centers, but still quick enough to guard faster forwards and guards who relied on the three-point shot. Green's basketball intelligence was valuable defense too, as he could often be seen reading offensive plays early, and directing teammates on defense to stop opposing players from generating open three-point shots.

The chemistry between Curry, Thompson and Green was good enough to produce playoff berths in the 2012–13 and 2013–14 NBA seasons, however, the Warriors did not excel in 3PA or 3P% either of those years, finishing in the middle of the league in both categories. After early playoff losses in both of those seasons, Warriors leadership opted to replace head coach Mark Jackson with Steve Kerr. Kerr implemented a motion offense similar to that in Phoenix, built around shooting, ball movement, cutting and finding the open man. In his first season with the team, Kerr coached the Warriors to a 67–15 regular season record, a then-franchise record, and Stephen Curry would win his first NBA MVP award. The Warriors' 27.0 3PA per game ranked only fifth in the 2014–15 regular season, but their efficiency, 39.8%, was the best in the league during the regular season. In the playoffs, the Warriors would win their first championship in 40 years with a 4–2 victory over LeBron James and the Cleveland Cavaliers.

The Warriors' dominance carried over into the 2015–16 season, during which they would record a regular season record of 73–9 the most regular season wins by any team in NBA history. Again, Curry would win NBA MVP honors, this time in a unanimous vote. During their record-setting season the Warriors attempted the most three point shots per game with 31.6, and again lead the league in 3P% with a near-record 41.6%. During this season, the Warriors routinely beat opposing teams by double digits, averaging a point differential of 10.76, the 7th highest in NBA history. Opposing teams had yet to figure out how to defend all of Golden State's shooters, and the defensive tandem of Green and Thompson often proved suffocating for opposing teams. The Warriors' 2015–16 season was punctuated with Game 7 loss to LeBron James and the Cleveland Cavaliers, after losing a 3 games to 1 lead in the 2016 NBA Finals. By this point, opposing teams like the Cavaliers had identified three-point shooting as the only way to compete with the Warriors, and signed three-point specialists to their roster such as J.R. Smith and Kevin Love.

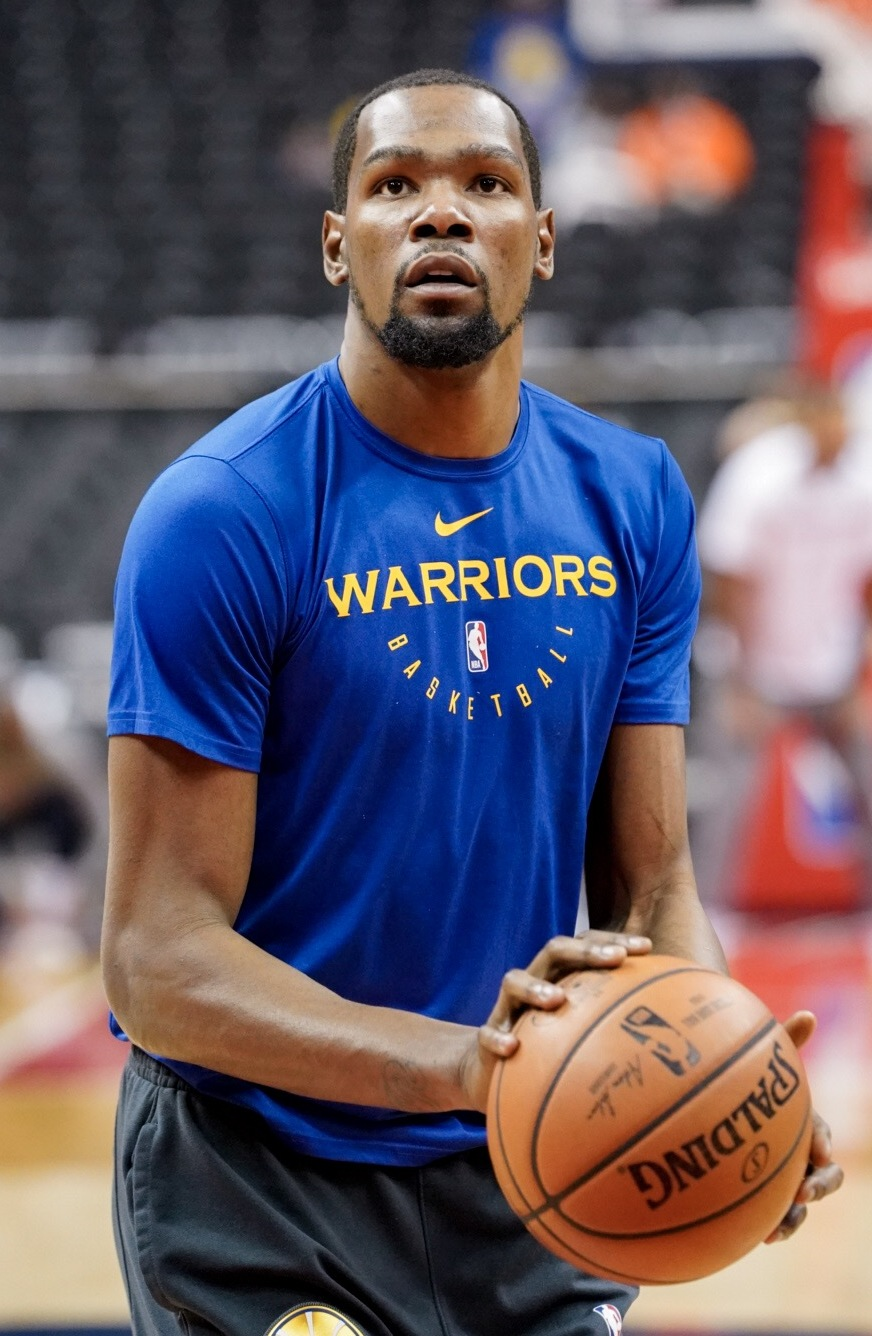
Kevin Durant

After a Game 7 loss in the NBA finals, the Warriors further improved the shooting versatility on their roster by signing former MVP Kevin Durant, who averaged 4.9 three point attempts per game on 38.5% efficiency for his career. Kevin Durant was considered one of the best players and three point shooters in the NBA, and the Warriors would surpass their previous point differential of 10.76 in the 2015–16 regular season, improving to 11.63 for the 2016–17 NBA season. In the 2016–17 NBA season the Warriors recorded 31.2 3PA per game on 38.3% efficiency on their way to another NBA championship at the expense of Lebron and the Cavaliers, despite the Cavaliers posting higher 3PA per game on better 3P%. In the 2017–18 season, the Warriors recorded 28.9 3PA on 39.1% efficiency, winning another championship at the expense of the Cavaliers. In the 2018–19 season, the Warriors recorded 34.4 3PA per game on 38.5% shooting, but injuries to Kevin Durant and Klay Thompson in the 2019 NBA Finals would mean a 4–2 loss to the Toronto Raptors. Durant left the Warriors in the offseason, signing with the Brooklyn Nets.

=== 2020s: League-wide response ===
The emergence of the Golden State Warriors as the most dominant team in the NBA would prompt teams in both the Eastern and Western Conferences to search for and cultivate three-point shooting talent in an effort to compete with the Warriors. While none of these teams have seen the success of the Warriors, their adoption of the three-point offense increased the overall pace and efficiency of NBA basketball, and became a fixture of the league. A number of teams surpassed the Warriors' three-point shooting statistics during their championship runs – most notably the Houston Rockets, led by general manager Daryl Morey, recorded an NBA record 45.4 3PA per game on 35.6% efficiency in the 2018–19 NBA season, and 45.3 3PA per game on 34.5% efficiency in the 2019–20 NBA season.
