= Small ball (basketball) =

Style of basketball play

In basketball, small ball is a style of play that sacrifices height, physical strength and low post offense/defense in favor of a lineup of smaller players for speed, agility and increased scoring (often from the three-point line). It is closely tied to the concepts of pace and space, which pushes the speed of the offense and spreads out the defense with extra shooters on the court. Many small ball lineups feature a non-traditional center who offers skills that are not normally found from players at that position. Teams often move a physically dominant player who would typically play the small forward position into the power forward position. Examples of players who have been used in this role include Kevin Durant, Carmelo Anthony, and LeBron James. That individual would play alongside either a traditional power forward (shifted into the center position), or alongside a center.

The advantage of using small ball is that the power forward position is occupied by a faster, more agile player who can outrun and outmaneuver the opposing power forward. In many cases the player may have a better three-point shooting percentage than a traditional power forward, which (as well as increasing points from three-point plays) can help spread the opposition defense. The opposing defender will come out to mark the player on the perimeter of the three point line, allowing space for teammates to run in and score around the basket. A player occupying this position, with a high three-point shot success percentage, is coined a "stretch four". Miami Heat coach Erik Spoelstra employed this style of play starting in 2011–12, labeling it as "pace and space". Early in the playoffs, small forward LeBron James filled in at power forward after the Heat lost starter Chris Bosh to injury. James remained at that position for the remainder of the playoffs, as Bosh was moved to center when he returned.

While the style of play does have advantages, there are several disadvantages. The addition of speed and agility comes at the cost of strength and height; the lack of traditional "big men" can make it more difficult to guard the space under the basket while on defense and can also prevent the team from having a low-post offensive threat when attacking. Rebounding is often sacrificed; for example, in the 2012–13 season, the Miami Heat, playing small ball, had the most wins during the season, but were the worst team in the NBA in rebounding. The biggest exposure of the shortcomings of a small and short team surely was on display in the Western Conference finals of 2018, where Houston Rockets, 1st seed of both the West and best team of the season, led by MVP James Harden with Chris Paul had a 3–2 lead over eventual & reigning champions, Golden State Warriors but were pushed into Game 7. The Rockets led the 1st half by double digits, yet their greatest strength also became their achilles heel where they spectacularly missed a record breaking 27 consecutive 3s, they lost by only 9pts, exposing just how over reliant their small ball system was on making 3s. A more balanced/traditionally sized team would have been better placed for scoring by other means than long ranged shots after such a drought of failed shots.

The Golden State Warriors in 2014–15 used small ball to a greater extent in the NBA Finals than any prior champion, swapping out big man Andrew Bogut from the starting lineup for Andre Iguodala, who would eventually be named the Finals MVP. The Warriors' small lineup came to be known as the Death Lineup. The Warriors attained a historic level of success, winning three NBA titles and setting the NBA wins record during the period from 2014 to 2017. The success of the Warriors' small ball lineups has caused some analysts to consider small ball to be the future of basketball, eschewing traditional lineups in favor of a brand of "positionless" basketball that allows teams to play small.

== See also ==
- Grinnell System
- Nellie ball
- Run and gun (basketball)
