= Tim Hardaway =

American basketball player (born 1966)

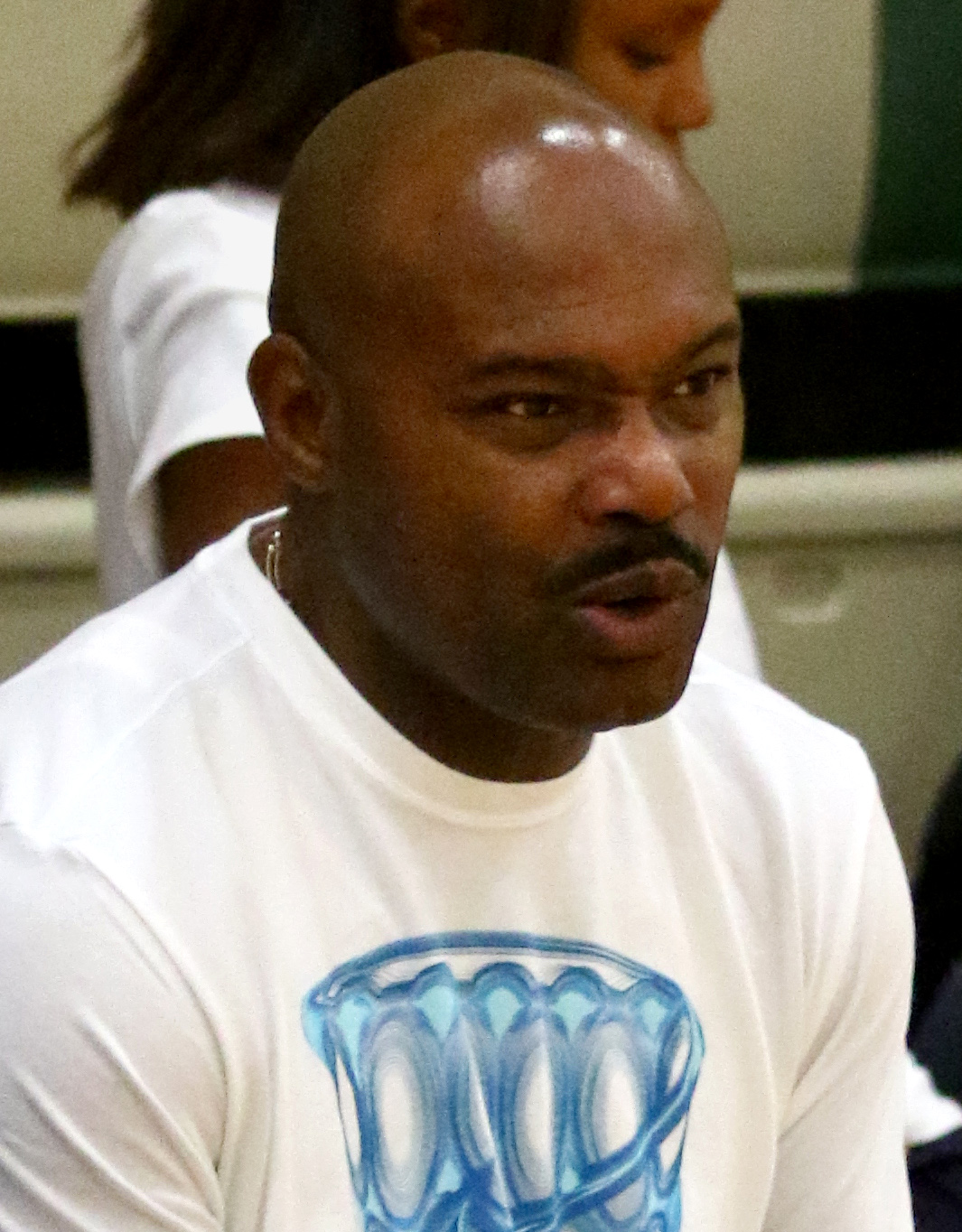
- Hardaway at a Summer 2015 youth clinic

Personal information
- Born: September 1, 1966 (age 60) Chicago, Illinois, U.S.
- Listed height: 6 ft 0 in (1.83 m)
- Listed weight: 195 lb (88 kg)

Career information
- High school: Carver (Chicago, Illinois)
- College: UTEP (1985–1989)
- NBA draft: 1989: 1st round, 14th overall pick
- Drafted by: Golden State Warriors
- Playing career: 1989–2003
- Position: Point guard
- Number: 5, 10, 14
- Coaching career: 2005–2006, 2014–2018

Career history

Playing
- 1989–1996: Golden State Warriors
- 1996–2001: Miami Heat
- 2001–2002: Dallas Mavericks
- 2002: Denver Nuggets
- 2003: Indiana Pacers

Career highlights
- 5× NBA All-Star (1991–1993, 1997, 1998); All-NBA First Team (1997); 3× All-NBA Second Team (1992, 1998, 1999); All-NBA Third Team (1993); NBA All-Rookie First Team (1990); No. 10 retired by Miami Heat; ABA All Star-Game (2006); Frances Pomeroy Naismith Award (1989); WAC Player of the Year (1989); WAC Tournament MVP (1989); First-team All-WAC (1989); Second-team All-WAC (1988); No. 10 retired by UTEP Miners

Career NBA statistics
- Points: 15,373 (17.7 ppg)
- Rebounds: 2,855 (3.3 rpg)
- Assists: 7,095 (8.2 apg)
- Stats at NBA.com
- Stats at Basketball Reference
- Basketball Hall of Fame
Medals
Men's basketball
Representing United States
Olympic Games
Gold medal – first place	2000 Sydney	Team competition

Timothy Duane Hardaway Sr. (born September 1, 1966) is an American former professional basketball player. Hardaway played in the National Basketball Association (NBA) for the Golden State Warriors, Miami Heat, Dallas Mavericks, Denver Nuggets and Indiana Pacers. He was a five-time NBA All-Star and a five-time All-NBA Team member. Hardaway won a gold medal with the United States national basketball team at the 2000 Summer Olympics. He was known for his crossover dribble which was dubbed the "UTEP two-step" by television analysts. In 2022 Hardaway was inducted into the Naismith Memorial Basketball Hall of Fame.

He is the father of NBA player Tim Hardaway Jr.

== Early life ==
Hardaway was born in Chicago, Illinois, and he graduated from Carver Area High School in 1985. On August 29, 2022, his jersey was retired by Carver Area.

== College career ==
Hardaway played college basketball for the UTEP Miners under head coach Don Haskins, a future member of the Naismith Memorial Basketball Hall of Fame.

Hardaway was twice named MVP of El Paso's Sun Bowl Invitational Tournament, in 1987 and 1988. He played on teams that went to the NCAA Tournaments from 1986 to 1989. He won the Frances Pomeroy Naismith Award in 1989 as the best college player in the nation six feet (1.83 m) tall or under. While playing for the Miners, Hardaway developed his crossover dribble move that was called the "UTEP two-step".

== Professional career ==
=== Golden State Warriors (1989–1996) ===
Hardaway was selected as the 14th overall pick of the 1989 NBA draft by the Golden State Warriors. In his rookie season, Hardaway wore number 5 on his jersey, as Manute Bol wore Hardaway's 10. After Bol left the Warriors, Hardaway acquired the number. Hardaway, Mitch Richmond, and Chris Mullin formed a trio known as Run TMC (the initials of the players' first names and a play on the name of the popular rap group Run-DMC). As part of the Warriors' attack, Hardaway was responsible for leading Run TMC's fast break, displaying his excellent passing and one-on-one skills to complement Richmond's slashing and Mullin's shooting.

Golden State made the playoffs during the 1990–91 season, Hardaway's second season and his first season in the playoffs. In the first round, the 7th seeded Warriors defeated the 2nd seeded San Antonio Spurs led by All-Star David Robinson in 4 games to advance to face the 3rd seeded Los Angeles Lakers led by NBA legend Magic Johnson. The Warriors managed to steal a game on the road in game 2, but could not defeat the more experienced Lakers, falling in five games despite Hardaway averaging 26.8 points, 12.8 assists and 3.8 steals for the series.

Hardaway averaged a career-high 23.4 points a game in the 1991–92 season, as the Warriors fell in the first round of the playoffs to the Seattle SuperSonics. The following season Hardaway averaged a career-high 10.6 assists a game to get with his scoring average of 21.5, but the Warriors did not make the playoffs and would not return to postseason action for the remainder of Hardaway's tenure with the team.

As a Warrior, Hardaway made the NBA All-Star Game three straight years. He suffered a torn ligament in his left knee that kept him out of the entire 1993–94 season. He reached 5,000 points and 2,500 assists faster than any other NBA player except Oscar Robertson. Hardaway played for the Warriors until the middle of 1995–96 season when he was traded to the Miami Heat along with Chris Gatling in exchange for Kevin Willis and Bimbo Coles.

=== Miami Heat (1996–2001) ===
Following the mid-season trade to Miami, Hardaway started 28 games to finish the season, averaging 17.2 points a game with 10 assists. Miami made the playoffs but were swept in the first round by the 72 win Chicago Bulls. The following season was a huge success for Miami and for Hardaway, as he finished 4th in voting for the NBA Most Valuable Player Award, was selected to the All-NBA First Team as Miami won a franchise record 61 wins.

Hardaway started in 81 games, averaging 20.3 points, 8.6 assists, while placing fourth in the league with 203 three-point baskets. He also played in the 1997 NBA All-Star Game, scoring 10 points in 14 minutes. In the playoffs, Hardaway averaged 26 points a game as the Heat defeated the Orlando Magic in the first round in 5 games, and then defeated the New York Knicks in 7 games in the semifinals, in which Hardaway scored 38 points in the 7th game. Miami would once again fall to the defending champion Chicago Bulls in the Eastern Conference Finals in 5 games.

In the 1997–98 season, Hardaway averaged 18.9 points and 8.3 assist per game, and was selected to play in the 1998 NBA All-Star Game. The Heat won 55 games and won the Atlantic Division, but lost to the Knicks in 5 games in the first round of the playoffs. In the lockout shortened 1998–99 season, he averaged 17.4 points a game with 7.3 assists, and Miami won the Atlantic Division again but could once again not defeat the Knicks in the first round of the playoffs despite having home court advantage and the Knicks being the 8th seed in the playoffs.

Hardaway's production slipped in the 1999–2000 season, with Alonzo Mourning and Jamal Mashburn carrying more of the offensive load. Hardaway averaged 13.4 points with 7.4 assists a game, but shot a personal best .367 percent from beyond the three-point arc. After playing just 52 games, Hardaway was further limited in the playoffs, as Miami defeated the Detroit Pistons but once again fell to New York in 7 games.

That summer, Hardaway and Mourning won a gold medal playing for the U.S.A. men's basketball team at the 2000 Summer Olympics in Sydney, Australia. Before the 2000–01 season Mourning would be diagnosed with a rare kidney disease, and would be sidelined for much of the season. Hardaway upped his offensive production to 14.9 points a game with 6.3 assists a game as Miami won 50 games and captured the East's third best record, only to be swept in the first round by the Charlotte Hornets.

=== Dallas Mavericks (2001–2002) ===
Following the 2000–01 season, and with his skills declining with age, Hardaway was traded to the Dallas Mavericks on August 22, 2001, for a second-round draft pick. He was at one time Miami's all-time leader in assists (2867).

With Dallas, Hardaway was mainly utilized off the bench, starting only two games out of 54 and averaging almost ten points a game. In the middle of the season, he was traded to the Denver Nuggets alongside Juwan Howard, Donnell Harvey and a future first-round draft pick in exchange for Nick Van Exel, Tariq Abdul-Wahad, Raef LaFrentz and Avery Johnson.

=== Denver Nuggets (2002) ===
With the Nuggets he started 14 games. He averaged 9.6 points and 5.5 assists for the team. Hardaway was suspended for two games and fined $10,000 by the league when he threw a television monitor onto the court after being ejected in the March 15 game against Orlando.

On March 23, facing the Seattle SuperSonics, Hardaway suffered a broken left foot after Randy Livingston landed on his foot in the first quarter that knocked him out for the rest of the game and season.

On June 25, 2002, the Nuggets decided to waive Hardaway and buy out the final two years of his contract for $1 million.

=== Indiana Pacers (2003) ===
Hardaway spent most of the 2002–03 season as a television commentator. On March 27, 2003, Hardaway signed a contract with the Indiana Pacers, who needed backcourt depth. In his first game, he registered a season-high 14 points and seven assists against the Chicago Bulls. He appeared in ten games and averaged eight minutes with two points. In the playoffs, he played in four games and averaged 11.8 minutes. In his final game in Game 6 of the first round of the 2003 NBA playoffs, he played in just three minutes and missed both of his shots in the series-ending loss to Boston. He retired in November 2003.

== Coaching career ==
=== Detroit Pistons (2014–2018) ===
On August 7, 2014, Hardaway was announced as an assistant coach for the Detroit Pistons.

== Achievements ==
Hardaway was the 1989 WAC Player of the Year. He recorded 5,000 points and 2,500 assists, second fastest in NBA history after Oscar Robertson. Hardaway accomplished it in 262 games; Robertson took only 247. He held the record for most assists in Miami Heat franchise history with 1,947, until his total was surpassed by Dwyane Wade on January 16, 2010.

Hardaway shares the record for second most steals in an NBA playoffs game, with 8 in Game 2 of the 1991 Western Conference Semifinals against the Los Angeles Lakers and in Game 4 of the 1992 Western Conference First Round against the Seattle SuperSonics. In 1991–92, Hardaway became the 7th player in NBA history to average 20 points (23.4 ppg) and 10 assists (10.0 apg) in a season, a feat he accomplished again in 1992–93 (21.5 ppg, 10.6 apg).

Hardaway holds the NBA record for the worst single-game shooting performance in NBA history, going 0-for-17 in a 106–102 win against the Minnesota Timberwolves on December 27, 1991. Hardaway holds the Miami Heat's all-time record in 3-point field goals made, with 806. His number 10 was retired by the Miami Heat on October 28, 2009. On April 2, 2022, Hardaway was announced as one of thirteen members to be inducted into the Naismith Basketball Hall of Fame for the Class of 2022.

== National team career ==
Hardaway was originally selected to play for "Dream Team II" in the 1994 FIBA World Championship but was replaced after suffering a torn knee ligament.

He was also selected (as one of the last two players selected) for the 1998 FIBA World Championship team. The team was later replaced with CBA and college players due to the NBA lockout.

In 2000, he played in the Sydney Olympics, averaging 5.5 points per game and shooting .385 (15–of-39) from the field as the Americans won the gold medal.

Hardaway was a player/head coach of the Florida Pit Bulls of the ABA in 2006.

In September 2009, he played for the NBA Generations team in the 2009 NBA Asia Challenge, a series of exhibitions against Korean Basketball League and Philippine Basketball Association players.

== Personal life ==
Hardaway and his wife Yolanda reside in Michigan. They have a son, Tim Jr., and daughters, Nia and Nina. Tim Jr. was drafted by the New York Knicks in 2013, and currently plays for the Miami Heat. The Heat allow Tim Jr. to wear his father's retired number 10 jersey in his honor.

== Controversy ==
During a February 14, 2007 interview on Miami's The Dan Le Batard Show, in response to the coming out of former NBA player John Amaechi, Hardaway remarked that he would try to distance himself from a player he knew was homosexual. When asked by the radio show host whether he realized that his remarks were homophobic, Hardaway responded by saying: "Well, you know, I hate gay people, so I let it be known. I don't like gay people and I don't like to be around gay people. I am homophobic. I don't like it. It shouldn't be in the world or in the United States." He also said that if he found out he had one or more gay teammates, he would try to get them fired.

Later in the day, Hardaway apologized for the remarks during a telephone interview with Fox affiliate WSVN in Miami. "I'm sorry. I shouldn't have said I hate gay people or anything like that." He further apologized on February 15 in a statement released by his agent.

On the same day, the NBA responded to Hardaway's comments by removing him from its All-Star Weekend activities later that week. His employer, Trinity Sports, owner of the Anderson-based CBA Indiana Alley Cats, dismissed him from his position as Chief Basketball Operations Advisor, and the CBA issued a statement distancing itself from Hardaway's remarks.

In a September 2007 interview, Hardaway spoke about his February comments, saying he "had no idea how much I hurt people. A lot of people." He described the controversy as "the biggest bump [in the road] in my life", and added, "I'm going to do whatever I can to correct it. That's all I can do."

In an interview on February 11, 2010, on Hardcore Sports Radio on Sirius, Hardaway spoke about his recent work with The Trevor Project and The YES Institute, which he had done to educate himself on LGBT issues.

In April 2013, when Jason Collins came out as the first active openly gay male player in a major American professional team sport, Collins said that Hardaway called him in support of his homosexuality. In July 2013, Hardaway was the symbolic first signer of a petition to put a proposed amendment to the Florida State Constitution overturning Florida Amendment 2 and allowing same-sex marriage in his home state of Florida on the ballot in 2014.

== Career statistics ==
Legend
GP	Games played	GS	Games started	MPG	Minutes per game
FG%	Field goal percentage	3P%	3-point field goal percentage	FT%	Free throw percentage
RPG	Rebounds per game	APG	Assists per game	SPG	Steals per game
BPG	Blocks per game	PPG	Points per game	**Bold**	Career high
*	Led the league

=== College ===
Year	Team	GP	GS	MPG	FG%	3P%	FT%	RPG	APG	SPG	BPG	PPG
1985–86	UTEP	28	–	15.5	**.521**	–	.651	1.3	1.9	.9	.1	4.1
1986–87	UTEP	31	30	29.7	.490	.250	.663	2.0	4.8	2.2	.2	10.0
1987–88	UTEP	32	29	32.4	.449	.340	**.754**	2.9	**5.7**	2.4	**.3**	13.6
1988–89	UTEP	**33**	**33**	**35.8**	.501	**.366**	.741	**4.0**	5.4	**2.8**	.2	**22.0**
Career		124	92	28.8	.484	.352	.718	2.6	4.5	2.1	.2	12.8

=== NBA ===
==== Regular season ====
Year	Team	GP	GS	MPG	FG%	3P%	FT%	RPG	APG	SPG	BPG	PPG
1989–90	Golden State	79	78	33.7	.471	.274	.764	3.9	8.7	2.1	**.2**	14.7
1990–91	Golden State	**82**	**82**	39.2	**.476**	**.385**	.803	**4.0**	9.7	**2.6**	.1	22.9
1991–92	Golden State	81	81	**41.1**	.461	.338	.766	3.8	10.0	2.0	**.2**	**23.4**
1992–93	Golden State	66	66	39.5	.447	.330	.744	**4.0**	**10.6**	1.8	.**2**	21.5
1994–95	Golden State	62	62	37.4	.427	.378	.760	3.1	9.3	1.4	**.2**	20.1
1995–96	Golden State	52	18	28.6	.421	.366	.769	2.5	6.9	1.4	**.2**	14.1
1995–96	Miami	28	28	37.4	.425	.361	.821	3.5	10.0	1.0	**.2**	17.2
1996–97	Miami	81	81	38.7	.415	.344	.799	3.4	8.6	1.9	.1	20.3
1997–98	Miami	81	81	37.4	.431	.351	.781	3.7	8.3	1.7	**.2**	18.9
1998–99	Miami	48	48	36.9	.400	.360	.812	3.2	7.3	1.2	.1	17.4
1999–00	Miami	52	52	32.2	.386	.367	.827	2.9	7.4	.9	.1	13.4
2000–01	Miami	77	77	33.9	.392	.366	.801	2.6	6.3	1.2	.1	14.9
2001–02	Dallas	54	2	23.6	.362	.341	**.833**	1.8	3.7	.4	.1	9.6
2001–02	Denver	14	14	23.2	.373	.373	.632	1.9	5.5	1.2	.1	9.6
2002–03	Indiana	10	0	12.7	.367	.355	.500	1.5	2.4	.9	.0	4.9
Career		867	770	35.3	.431	.355	.782	3.3	8.2	1.6	.1	17.7
All-Star		5	0	16.8	.386	.381	.786	2.6	4.6	1.0	0.0	10.6

==== Playoffs ====
Year	Team	GP	GS	MPG	FG%	3P%	FT%	RPG	APG	SPG	BPG	PPG
1991	Golden State	9	9	44.0	**.486**	.354	.789	3.7	**11.2**	3.1	**.8**	25.2
1992	Golden State	4	4	44.0	.400	.345	.649	3.8	7.3	**3.3**	.0	24.5
1996	Miami	3	3	36.7	.465	.364	.714	1.7	5.7	1.0	.0	17.7
1997	Miami	**17**	**17**	41.2	.359	.313	**.795**	**4.1**	7.0	1.6	.1	18.7
1998	Miami	5	5	**44.4**	.447	**.436**	.784	3.4	6.6	1.2	.0	**26.0**
1999	Miami	5	5	36.4	.268	.200	.625	2.8	6.4	1.0	.2	9.0
2000	Miami	7	7	26.0	.294	.206	.700	2.1	4.7	.7	.0	7.7
2001	Miami	2	2	18.0	.222	.333	.000	1.0	4.5	.0	.0	2.5
2003	Indiana	4	0	11.8	.333	.300	.000	.5	2.3	.3	.0	3.3
Career		56	52	36.6	.393	.320	.751	3.1	6.8	1.6	.2	16.8

== See also ==
- List of NBA career assists leaders
