= List of Milwaukee Brewers broadcasters =

== Current broadcasters ==
Radio: Flagship WTMJ 620 plus other stations in the Midwest on the Brewers Radio Network.
Television (English): Brewers.TV (MLB Local Media), with selected games on Milwaukee Fox station WITI and other stations within Wisconsin.
Television (Spanish): A schedule of mainly Sunday home games is carried by Milwaukee's Telemundo network affiliate, WYTU-LD (channels 63/49.4).

== Radio ==
- Jeff Levering, Play by Play (since 2015)
- Lane Grindle, Substitute Play by Play (since 2016)
- Josh Maurer, Substitute Play by Play (since 2022)

== Television ==
- Brian Anderson, Play by Play (since 2007)
- Bill Schroeder, Color Analyst (since 1995)
- Sophia Minnaert, Reporter (since 2013)
- Craig Coshun, Brewers Live Host (since 2007), Reporter (since 2001), Substitute Play by Play (since 2010)
- Stephen Watson, Brewers Live Host (since 2022)
- Tim Dillard, Brewers Live Color Analyst (since 2021)
- Vinny Rottino, Brewers Live Color Analyst (since 2021)
- Jeff Levering, Play by Play (since 2015)
- Telly Hughes, Reporter (since 2009)

== Radio broadcasters ==
- Josh Maurer (2022–present)
- Lane Grindle (2016–present)
- Jeff Levering (2015–present)
- Craig Counsell (2014) (fill-in)
- Darryl Hamilton (2014) (fill-in) (deceased)
- Jerry Augustine (2014) (fill-in)
- Joe Block (2012–2015)
- Dave Nelson (2010) (interim basis, while Uecker was on medical leave) (deceased)
- Cory Provus (2009–2011)
- Jim Powell (1996–2008)
- Pat Hughes (1984–1995)
- Dwayne Mosley (1982–1983)
- Lorn Brown (1980–1981)
- Bob Uecker (1971–2024) (deceased)
- Tom Collins (1970–1972)
- Merle Harmon (1970–1979)
- Bill Schonely (1969)
- Jimmy Dudley (1969) (deceased)

== Radio broadcasters chronology ==
- **Bold** denotes current broadcasters as of the 2016 Brewers season
- † - Denotes season where franchise was based in Seattle as the Pilots, which aired game broadcasts on KVI

=== Radio broadcasters ===
- Merle Harmon (1970–79) (deceased)
- Tom Collins (1970–1972) (deceased)
- Bob Uecker (1971–2024) (deceased) (2014-2019, about 120 games per season) (2020-2024, mostly home games each season)
- Lorn Brown (1980–81) (deceased)
- Dwayne Mosely (1982–83)
- Pat Hughes (1984–95)
- Jim Powell (1996–2008)
- Len Kasper (1999–2001) (fill-in only)
- Cory Provus (2009–2011)
- Dave Nelson (2010) (filled in when Uecker was out because heart surgery) (deceased)
- Joe Block (2012–15)
- Darryl Hamilton (2014) (fill-in for Uecker) (deceased)
- Craig Counsell (2014) (fill-in for Uecker)
- Jerry Augustine (2014) (fill-in for Uecker)
- **Jeff Levering** (2015–present) (fill-in for about 40 games (2015), full-time (2016–2021), fill-in for about 50 games 2022–present)
- **Lane Grindle** (2016–present) (fill-in for Uecker in about 40 games (2015–2021), full-time 2022–present)

=== TV broadcasters ===
- **Jeff Levering (2022–present)**
- Matt Lepay (2014–2021) (fill-in work only)
- **Brian Anderson (2007–present)**
- Daron Sutton (2002–2006)
- **Craig Coshun (2001–present)**
- Len Kasper (1999–2001) (fill-in only)
- Jim Powell (1999–2000) (fill-in work only)
- Matt Vasgersian (1997–2001)
- **Bill Schroeder (1995–present)**
- Rory Markas (1992–1994) (deceased)
- Del Crandall (1992–1994) (deceased)
- Pete Vuckovich (1989–1991)
- Jim Paschke (1987–1991, 1995–1996)
- Steve Shannon (1981–1986) (deceased)
- Kent Derdivanis (1981)
- Joe Castiglione (1981)
- Mike Hegan (1978–1980, 1982–1988) (deceased)
- Ray Scott (1976–1977) (deceased)
- Gary Bender (1975)
- Eddie Doucette (1973–1974)
- Johnny Logan (1973) (deceased)
- Bob Uecker (1972, 1976–1980, 1984) (deceased)
- Jim Irwin (1971, 1975) (deceased)
- Tom Collins (1970–1974, 1981) (deceased)
- Merle Harmon (1970–1972, 1976–1979) (deceased)
- Dan O'Neill (1970)

== TV broadcasters chronology ==
Year	Play by Play	Analyst(s)		
1970	Merle Harmon	Tom Collins	Dan O'Neill	
1971	Merle Harmon	Tom Collins	Jim Irwin	
1972	Merle Harmon	Tom Collins	Bob Uecker	
1973	Eddie Doucette	Tom Collins	Johnny Logan	
1974	Eddie Doucette	Tom Collins		
1975	Jim Irwin	Gary Bender		
1976	Ray Scott	Bob Uecker	Merle Harmon	
1977	Ray Scott	Bob Uecker	Merle Harmon	
1978	Mike Hegan	Bob Uecker	Merle Harmon	
1979	Mike Hegan	Bob Uecker	Merle Harmon	
1980	Mike Hegan	Bob Uecker		
1981	Steve Shannon	Kent Derdivanis	Tom Collins	Joe Castiglione
1982	Steve Shannon	Mike Hegan		
1983	Steve Shannon	Mike Hegan		
1984	Steve Shannon	Mike Hegan	Bob Uecker	
1985	Steve Shannon	Mike Hegan		
1986	Steve Shannon	Mike Hegan		
1987	Jim Paschke	Mike Hegan		
1988	Jim Paschke	Mike Hegan		
1989	Jim Paschke	Pete Vuckovich		
1990	Jim Paschke	Pete Vuckovich		
1991	Jim Paschke	Pete Vuckovich		
1992	Rory Markas	Del Crandall		
1993	Rory Markas	Del Crandall		
1994	Rory Markas	Del Crandall		
1995	Jim Paschke	Bill Schroeder		
1996	Jim Paschke	Bill Schroeder		
1997	Matt Vasgersian	Bill Schroeder		
1998	Matt Vasgersian	Bill Schroeder		
1999	Matt Vasgersian	Bill Schroeder	Len Kasper	Jim Powell
2000	Matt Vasgersian	Bill Schroeder	Len Kasper	Jim Powell
2001	Matt Vasgersian	Bill Schroeder	Len Kasper	
2002	Daron Sutton	Bill Schroeder		
2003	Daron Sutton	Bill Schroeder		
2004	Daron Sutton	Bill Schroeder		
2005	Daron Sutton	Bill Schroeder		
2006	Daron Sutton	Bill Schroeder		
2007	Brian Anderson	Bill Schroeder		
2008	Brian Anderson	Bill Schroeder		
2009	Brian Anderson	Bill Schroeder		
2010	Brian Anderson	Bill Schroeder	Craig Coshun	
2011	Brian Anderson	Bill Schroeder	Craig Coshun	
2012	Brian Anderson	Bill Schroeder	Craig Coshun	
2013	Brian Anderson	Bill Schroeder	Craig Coshun	
2014	Brian Anderson; Matt Lepay	Bill Schroeder	Craig Coshun	
2015	Brian Anderson; Matt Lepay	Bill Schroeder	Craig Coshun	
2016	Brian Anderson; Matt Lepay	Bill Schroeder	Craig Coshun	
2017	Brian Anderson; Matt Lepay	Bill Schroeder	Craig Coshun	
2018	Brian Anderson; Matt Lepay	Bill Schroeder	Craig Coshun	
2019	Brian Anderson; Matt Lepay	Bill Schroeder	Craig Coshun	
2020	Brian Anderson; Matt Lepay	Bill Schroeder	Craig Coshun	
2021	Brian Anderson; Matt Lepay	Bill Schroeder	Craig Coshun	
2022	Jeff Levering; Brian Anderson	Bill Schroeder	Craig Coshun	
