= FanDuel Sports Network Wisconsin =

American regional sports network

- Country: United States
- Broadcast area: Wisconsin; Eastern Minnesota; Western Upper Peninsula of Michigan; Northwestern Illinois; Iowa; Nationwide (via satellite)
- Network: FanDuel Sports Network
- Headquarters: Milwaukee, Wisconsin, U.S.

Programming
- Language: English
- Picture format: 720p (HDTV); 480i (SDTV)

Ownership
- Owner: Main Street Sports Group

History
- Launched: April 1, 2007; 19 years ago
- Replaced: FSN North (in broadcast area only)
- Closed: September 30, 2026 (37 days ago)
- Former names: FSN Wisconsin (2007–2012); Fox Sports Wisconsin (2012–2021); Bally Sports Wisconsin (2021-2024)

Links
- Website: www.fanduelsportsnetwork.com

FanDuel Sports Network Wisconsin was an American regional sports network owned by Main Street Sports Group (formerly Diamond Sports Group) and operates as an affiliate of FanDuel Sports Network. Operating as the "Wisconsin" sub-feed of Fox Sports North until 2007, the channel was known as Fox Sports Wisconsin until 2021. It broadcast regional coverage of sports events throughout the state of Wisconsin, with a focus on professional sports teams based in Milwaukee, namely the Milwaukee Bucks of the National Basketball Association. It primarily operated from a studio/office facility in downtown Milwaukee, with secondary offices and production studio/office hub based in downtown Minneapolis, Minnesota.

FanDuel Sports Network Wisconsin was available on cable providers throughout Wisconsin, extreme eastern Minnesota, the western Upper Peninsula of Michigan, northwestern Illinois, and Iowa; it is also available nationwide on satellite via DirecTV.

FanDuel Sports Network Wisconsin broadcast 2,600 hours of locally produced programming per year and reached more than 1.7 million homes.

== History ==
=== Origins ===
The first effort to air the Bucks and Brewers on cable, Sportsvue in 1984, was hampered by multiple factors, including dispersed systems and uncabled parts of the state of Wisconsin (including Milwaukee itself), team nadirs for the Bucks and Brewers and the availability of Chicago Cubs games via superstation WGN-TV throughout the state. Sportsvue was discontinued at the beginning of 1985 and resulted in the sale of the Bucks to future senator Herb Kohl. In the meantime, the Bucks and Brewers returned to a statewide broadcast network originated by Gaylord Broadcasting's WVTV, and later WCGV-TV, which was hampered by the two teams limiting their schedule to mainly road games.

Wisconsin Sports Network (unrelated to the current-day high school-focused sports publishing operation), a gametime-only network that broadcast Milwaukee Brewers baseball and Milwaukee Bucks basketball games. The channel was owned by Time Warner Cable's Milwaukee franchise and Group W. In 1996, it was taken over by the Minneapolis-based Midwest Sports Channel (MSC), which was owned by CBS (as a result of CBS' 1995 merger with Group W's corporate parent Westinghouse). Shortly afterward, MSC became an affiliate of the fledgling Fox Sports Net in the fall of 1996.

From then on until 2007, Wisconsin was served by one of three regional subfeeds of MSC/FSN North; the other two being a feed for the Twin Cities metropolitan area and a feed for the rest of Minnesota (as well as Iowa, North Dakota and South Dakota). CBS sold the network to News Corporation in 2000, ultimately rebranding as FSN North in April 2001. Despite being well out of the station's market area, MSC's late night encore of WCCO's 10:00 p.m. newscast also aired on the Wisconsin network until the Fox purchase. The network then began maintaining offices at the studios of Fox owned-and-operated station WITI (channel 6, which was owned by Tribune Broadcasting from 2007 until 2020, when Fox re-purchased the station) in the Milwaukee suburb of Brown Deer, along with sharing limited programming with that station.

=== Wisconsin gets its own channel ===
FSN North converted the Wisconsin feed into a separate channel, FSN Wisconsin. The channel launched on April 1, 2007, coinciding with the start of the 2007 Milwaukee Brewers season, originating from facilities in Milwaukee. That year it aired 125 Brewers games and 70 Bucks games. Other programming included the Minnesota Wild (NHL), University of Wisconsin athletic events, WIAC events, and WIAA high school sports, including live telecasts of the annual football championships. At launch FSN Wisconsin was available to more than 1.5 million homes and produced nearly 2,600 hours of local programming.

After Fox Television Stations sold WITI to Local TV in 2008, FSN Wisconsin relocated its operations to facilities in downtown Milwaukee. As part of the national rebranding of the Fox Sports Networks in 2012, FSN Wisconsin was rebranded as Fox Sports Wisconsin.

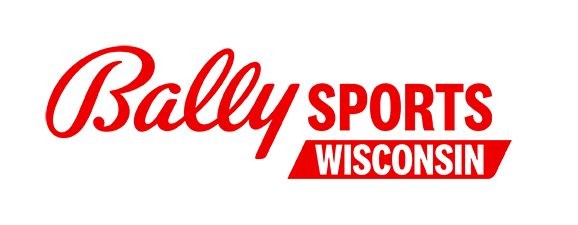
Former logo as Bally Sports Wisconsin, used from 2021 to 2024.

On December 14, 2017, as part of a merger between both companies, The Walt Disney Company announced plans to acquire all 22 regional Fox Sports networks from 21st Century Fox, including Fox Sports Wisconsin. However, on June 27, 2018, the Justice Department ordered their divestment under antitrust grounds, citing Disney's ownership of ESPN. On May 3, 2019, Sinclair Broadcast Group and Entertainment Studios (through their joint venture, Diamond Holdings) bought Fox Sports Networks from The Walt Disney Company for $10.6 billion. The deal closed on August 22, 2019, thus placing Fox Sports Wisconsin in common ownership with the Milwaukee and Green Bay duopolies of WVTV/WVTV-DT2, WLUK-TV/WCWF and Madison Fox affiliate WMSN. On November 17, 2020, Sinclair announced an agreement with casino operator Bally's Corporation to serve as a new naming rights partner for the FSN channels. Sinclair announced the new Bally Sports branding for the channels on January 27, 2021. On March 31, 2021, coinciding with the 2021 Major League Baseball season, Fox Sports Wisconsin was rebranded as Bally Sports Wisconsin.

In February 2021, the Brewers and Sinclair announced a new contract that gave the Brewers a minority share in the network. The deal is reportedly worth around $34 million per year for four years. The network also originated the official team coverage of the Bucks' 2021 championship parade.

On March 14, 2023, Diamond Sports filed for Chapter 11 Bankruptcy.

On October 9, 2024, after the Brewers' contract with Diamond expired, MLB Local Media announced that it would take the Brewers' media rights in-house, which would have ended the team's relationship with Bally Sports and its forerunners after 27 years.

On October 21, 2024, the network was rebranded as FanDuel Sports Network Wisconsin, as part of a new sponsorship agreement between Diamond and sports betting company FanDuel.

On December 31, 2024, the Brewers announced that it had opted to renew with Diamond and remain on FanDuel Sports Network for the 2025 season instead. The team's president of business operations Rick Schlesinger stated that Diamond offered to renegotiate with the team, explaining that "their executives reached out and said, 'Hey, we want to explore a potential new structure with you and new opportunities.' And I said, 'We are certainly open.'" The contract will also add the ability to distribute in-market streams of Brewers games via Amazon Prime Video Channels.

On March 19, 2025, the team announced that through a deal made with WTMJ radio owner Good Karma Brands and FanDuel Sports Network Wisconsin that former sister station WITI, along with a state network of stations within the team's territory, would carry three spring training and ten regular season games in the 2025 season locally in a simulcast with the cable channel.

On February 2, 2026, the Milwaukee Brewers announced that they would finally leave FanDuel Sports Network, ending the team's relationship with FanDuel Sports Network after 28 years. MLB also announced that they would be taking over production and distribution of Brewers games starting in the 2026 season.

== Programming ==
FanDuel Sports Network Wisconsin held the regional cable television rights to NBA games from the Milwaukee Bucks (whose telecasts became exclusive to the network starting with the 2007–08 season), and since 2000, simulcast most of the NHL games from the Minnesota Wild televised by FanDuel Sports Network North (usually through FanDuel Sports Network Wisconsin Extra), as well as pre-game, post-game and fan shows for all three teams. In 2018, simulcasts of Major League Soccer's Minnesota United FC matches were added to Fox Sports Wisconsin after Fox Sports North assumed that team's rights.

The channel also carried high school sports competitions sanctioned by the Wisconsin Interscholastic Athletic Association (WIAA) until 2023 (the girls' and boys' state tournament final rights were held by Allen Media Group's Wisconsin broadcast cluster and a statewide network of broadcast stations, though Bally Sports Wisconsin was allowed to carry replays of the tournament), weekend outdoor sports programming, and many of the national programs distributed by Bally Sports. It also aired NCAA competitions from the Big East Conference, Big Ten Conference and the Wisconsin Intercollegiate Athletic Conference, and a limited schedule of Marquette men's games through a sub-licensing deal with sister network Fox Sports 1 in which some games not of national interest were distributed to their regional sports network partners, CBS Sports Network and the ESPN family of networks as part of the "new" Big East's television contract (Bally Sports Wisconsin acquired the partial rights to Marquette sports events from Time Warner Cable Sports (the now-defunct Spectrum Sports), a regional network available only on Time Warner systems in eastern Wisconsin, which had been carrying the games since 2006 until 2013).

The channel carried select programming from FanDuel TV due to the naming rights deal with FanDuel.

From 2007 to 2011, FanDuel Sports Network Wisconsin sub-licensed a package of fifteen Milwaukee Brewers games for broadcast on Milwaukee independent station WMLW-CA (channel 41, now Me-TV owned-and-operated station WBME-CD); the Fox Sports-produced broadcasts aired outside of the Milwaukee market on Bally Sports Wisconsin, while WMLW owner Weigel Broadcasting sold advertising for those telecasts. The deal was discontinued after the 2011 season due to the Brewers wanting a schedule of games entirely in high definition (until a move of WMLW's schedule to a full-power signal in August 2012, this was impossible for them to do, along with multiplexing limitations) and the launch of a secondary feed allowing live coverage of both Brewers and Bucks games, making the team exclusive to the network.

== Other services ==
=== FanDuel Sports Network Wisconsin HD ===
FanDuel Sports Network Wisconsin HD is a 720p high definition simulcast feed of FanDuel Sports Network Wisconsin. All Bucks and Brewers games are broadcast in HD, as well as sports and magazine programs distributed nationally by FanDuel Sports Network. Depending on the market, FanDuel Sports Network Wisconsin Extra is also transmitted in high definition. Since 2012, the HD feed has been downscaled in letterbox on the channel's standard definition feed, as had become standard for all of Fox's cable networks.

=== FanDuel Sports Network Extra ===
FanDuel Sports Network Extra is an overflow feed that launched on April 9, 2012, and is available in both high definition and standard definition on most cable and satellite providers. The channel is mainly used to allow the network to air games that cannot air on FanDuel Sports Network Wisconsin due to events with conflicting scheduling – for example, when a Brewers game airs on FanDuel Sports Network Wisconsin, a Milwaukee Bucks game scheduled to start during the duration of the game is carried over FanDuel Sports Network Wisconsin Extra (this example often occurs from March to April (or as late as June), when the NBA and Major League Baseball (MLB) seasons overlap, although the reverse situation may occur whenever the Bucks are involved in a pre-Conference Final playoff game), along with Wild and Minnesota United games where scheduled. It also carried national college sports rights they held as FSN, such as the lower-interest Big 12 Conference matchups which were usually pre-empted locally, and were of spare interest to Wisconsin viewers.

FanDuel Sports Network Wisconsin Extra also airs Minnesota Wild hockey games simulcast from FanDuel Sports Network North that can be shown in-market when FanDuel Sports Network Wisconsin is airing a game of local interest. Due to blackout restrictions imposed by MLB and the NBA, Minnesota Twins and Timberwolves games are not broadcast on FanDuel Sports Network Wisconsin, although games from both teams are cleared to air via FanDuel Sports Network North in parts of Wisconsin. Some systems carry the Extra channel on a full-time basis, while others carry it only for game telecasts; non-game Extra programming contains a loop of national FanDuel Sports Network programming such as the World Poker Tour.

== On-air staff ==
=== Former ===
==== Milwaukee Bucks telecasts ====
- Lisa Byington – play-by-play announcer
- Dave Koehn – alternate play-by-play announcer (usually main radio play-by-play)
- Steve Novak - color analyst
- Marques Johnson - color analyst
- Craig Coshun – Bucks Live host
- Stephen Watson – Bucks Live host (mostly for road games)
- Melanie Ricks – sideline reporter

==== Wisconsin Badgers telecasts ====
- Matt Lepay – host of syndicated Badger Sports Report, for Wisconsin Badgers athletics

=== Former ===
==== Milwaukee Brewers telecasts ====
- Brian Anderson – play-by-play announcer
- Jeff Levering - play-by-play announcer for radio and TV (in place of Anderson when he has TNT Sports commitments)
- Bill Schroeder – color commentary
- Chris Singleton – alternate color commentary
- Craig Coshun – Brewers Live host, field reporter, and alternative play-by-play announcer
- Stephen Watson – Brewers Live host
- Sophia Minnaert – field reporter and features
- Tim Dillard – Brewers Live analyst, alternate color commentary
- Vinny Rottino – Brewers Live analyst, alternate color commentary
- Davey Nelson – Brewers Live analyst (deceased; Brewers Live desk is named in his honor)
- Jerry Augustine – Brewers Pregame/Postgame analyst (moved to the Milwaukee Brewers Radio Network in 2021)

==== Milwaukee Bucks telecasts ====
- Jon McGlocklin - Bucks color analyst
- Telly Hughes – Bucks & Brewers field reporter
- Jim Paschke - Bucks play-by-play announcer
- Katie George – Bucks sideline reporter (now at ESPN and ESPN on ABC)
- Zora Stephenson – sideline reporter & fill-in play-by-play announcer
