= History of the Golden State Warriors =

The Golden State Warriors were founded as the Philadelphia Warriors in Philadelphia in 1946. In 1962, the franchise moved to San Francisco, California, and became known as the San Francisco Warriors. In 1971, the team was renamed Golden State Warriors. The team has won seven championships: the first in its inaugural 1946–47 season, another in Philadelphia in 1955–56, and five more as Golden State in the 1974–75, 2014–15, 2016–17, 2017–18 and 2021–22 seasons.

== 1946–1962: Philadelphia ==
=== 1946–1959: The Fulks and Arizin era ===
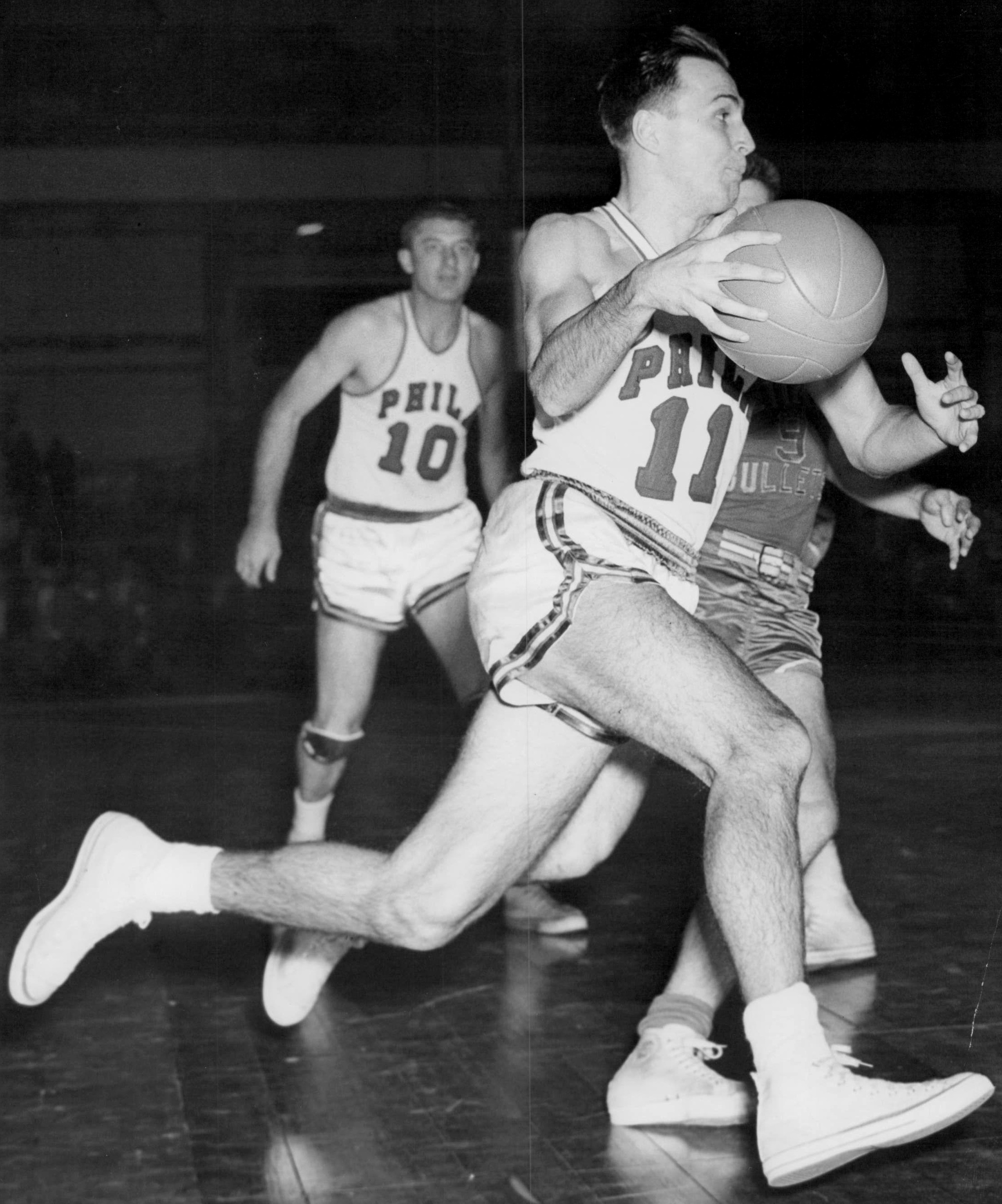
Early Warriors stars Joe Fulks (#10) and Paul Arizin (#11) had three league scoring titles between them.

The Warriors were founded in Philadelphia in 1946 as the Philadelphia Warriors, a charter member of the Basketball Association of America. They were owned by Peter A. Tyrrell, who also owned the Philadelphia Rockets of the American Hockey League. Tyrell hired Eddie Gottlieb, a longtime basketball promoter in the Philadelphia area, as coach and general manager. Gottlieb named the team after the Philadelphia Warriors, which he founded with his friends Harry Passon and Hughie Black in 1917 as the Philadelphia YMHA, which was sponsored by the Young Men's Hebrew Association of South Philadelphia and played in the minor league American League of Philadelphia, before being renamed the Philadelphia Sphas (1918–1921, 1922–1926, 1927–1933, 1937–1959) — a team of primarily Jewish players that was sponsored by the South Philadelphia Hebrew Association and played in the Eastern Basketball League and American Basketball League — and subsequently renamed the Philadelphia Passon, Gottlieb, Black (after the founders) (1921–1923); the Philadelphia Warriors (1926–1928); the Philadelphia Hebrews (1933–1937); the Atlantic City Tides (1949); and the Baltimore Rockets (1959), an exhibition team for the Harlem Globetrotters. Today, some, including former NBA player Carmelo Anthony, have called on the team to change its name because Warriors are associated with Native American iconography, although the term itself has been used to describe many types of warfarers, both past and present, however team management today in regards to the controversy over the team's name history, has stated the name "Warriors" is now nothing more than an honorable reference to the United States military.

Led by early scoring sensation Joe Fulks, the Warriors won the championship in the league's inaugural 1946–47 season by defeating the Chicago Stags, four games to one. (The BAA merged with the National Basketball League to become the National Basketball Association in 1949.) Among the individual Warriors highlights of the 1940s, Fulks set an NBA single-game scoring record of 63 points in 1949 that stood for more than 10 years. Gottlieb bought the team in 1951.

The Warriors won their other championship as a Philadelphia team in the 1955–56 season, defeating the Fort Wayne Pistons, four games to one. The stars of this era in the team's history were future Hall of Famers Paul Arizin, Tom Gola and Neil Johnston. Arizin and Johnston won five of the six NBA scoring titles between the 1951–52 and 1956–57 seasons, while Johnston led the NBA in rebounding during the 1954–55 season and Andy Phillip led the NBA in assists twice during the early 1950s.

=== 1959–1965: The scoring machine – Wilt Chamberlain era ===
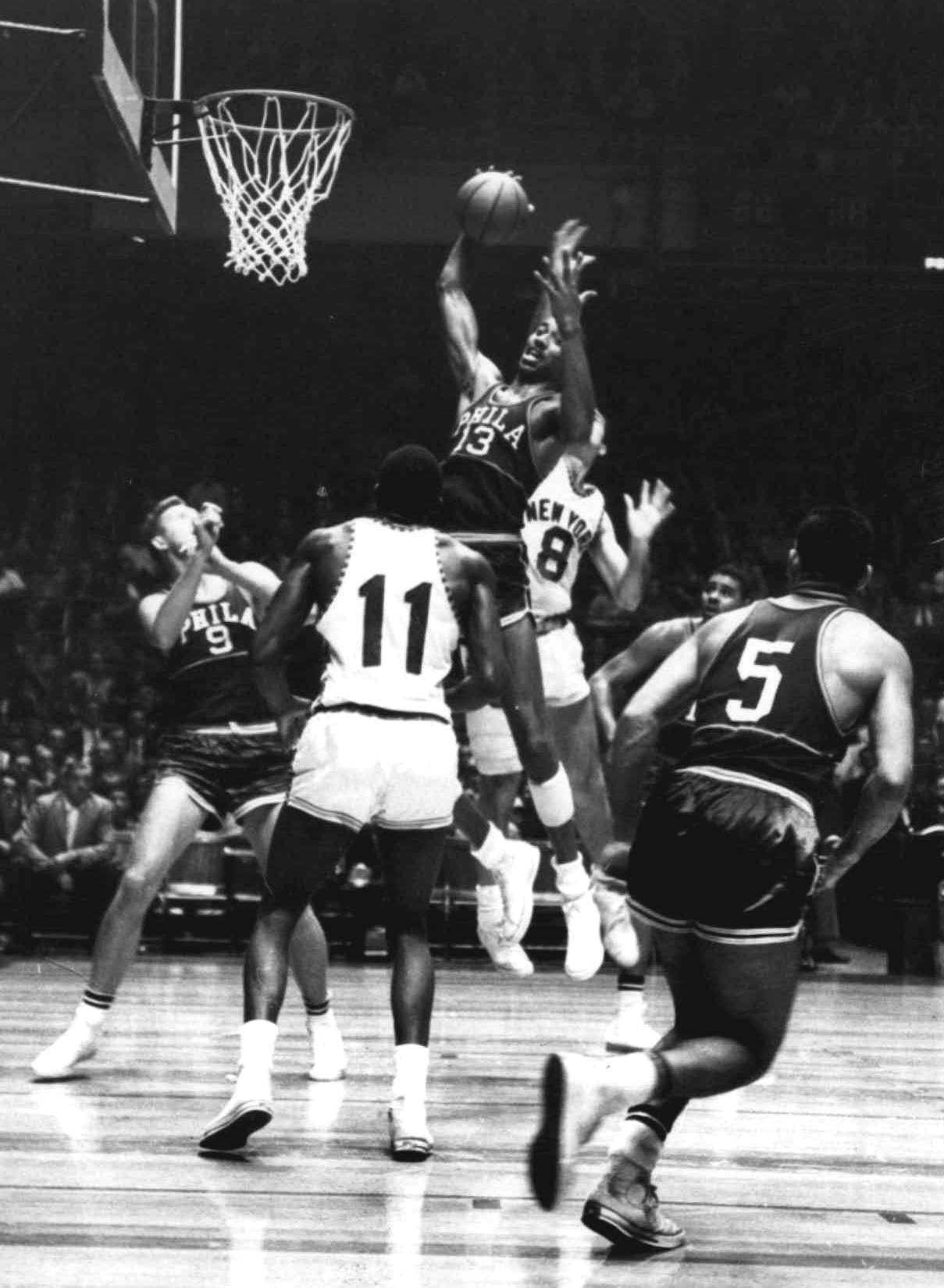
Wilt Chamberlain set numerous NBA scoring and rebounding records as a Warrior.

In 1959, the team signed draft pick Wilt Chamberlain, a Philadelphia native (he graduated from Overbrook High School). Known as "Wilt the Stilt", Chamberlain quickly began shattering NBA scoring and rebounding records and changed the style of play forever. During each of his three seasons as a Philadelphia Warrior, Chamberlain led the NBA in both scoring and rebounding. In his first season, he was named NBA Rookie of the Year, the NBA All-Star Game MVP, and the league's regular season MVP after averaging 37.6 points per game and 27.0 rebounds per game. In his second season, he set still-standing records when he averaged 27.2 rebounds per game and grabbed 55 rebounds in a single game. On March 2, 1962, in a Warriors game played on a neutral court in Hershey, Pennsylvania, Chamberlain scored 100 points against the New York Knicks, a single-game record that the NBA ranks among its finest moments. During that season, his third in the league, Chamberlain averaged 50.4 points per game and 25.7 rebounds per game.

== 1962–1971: San Francisco ==
In 1962, Franklin Mieuli purchased a majority share of the team and moved the franchise to the San Francisco Bay Area. Renaming the San Francisco Warriors, they played most home games at the Cow Palace in Daly City, just south of the San Francisco border, with occasionally playing home games in nearby cities such as Oakland and San Jose. During their first season in San Francisco, Chamberlain again led the league in scoring at 44.8 points per game and rebounding at 24.3 rebounds per game.

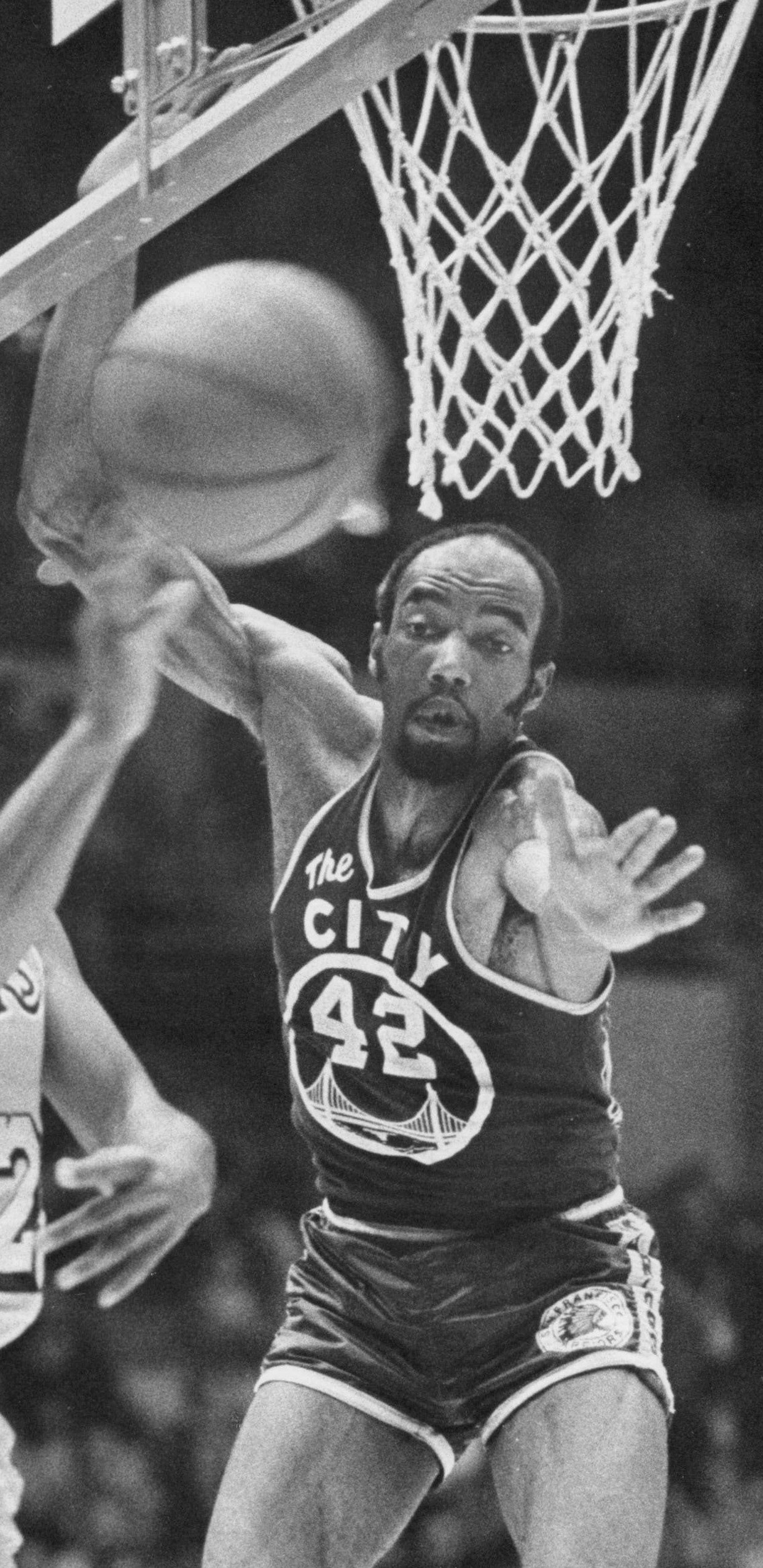
Nate Thurmond averaged over 20 points per game during five different seasons and over 20 rebounds per game during two seasons while with the Warriors.

Before the 1963–64 season, the Warriors drafted 6'11" power forward Nate Thurmond to play with Chamberlain. The Warriors won the 1963–64 Western Division title, but lost the NBA championship series to the Boston Celtics led by Bill Russell, four games to one.

During the 1964–65 season, the Warriors traded Wilt Chamberlain to the Philadelphia 76ers, and they finished the season with only 17 wins. In the off-season, the Warriors drafted Rick Barry in the first round. Barry was named the 1965–66 NBA Rookie of the Year after averaging 25.7 points per game and 10.6 rebounds per game. With the opening of the Oakland Coliseum Arena in 1966, the Warriors began scheduling increasing numbers of home games at that venue.

In the 1966–67 season, Barry averaged a league-leading 35.6 points per game and Nate Thurmond averaged 21.3 RPG. Together, they helped to lead the Warriors to the best record in the Western Division and ultimately, the NBA finals. The team lost in six games to the team that replaced the Warriors in Philadelphia, the 76ers, despite Barry's output of 40.8 points per game performance during the NBA Finals.

Angered by management's failure to pay him certain incentive awards he felt he was due, Barry sat out the 1967–68 season, joining the Oakland Oaks of the rival American Basketball Association the following year.

== 1971–2019: Oakland ==
The Warriors changed their name to the Golden State Warriors for the 1971–72 season, playing almost all home games in Oakland. Six "home" games were played in San Diego during that season but more significantly, none were played in San Francisco or Daly City. After changing their name from the San Francisco Warriors, the Warriors became (and remain) the only NBA team that does not include the name of their state or their city in their name (although "Golden State" is a well-known California nickname).

After four seasons in the ABA, Barry rejoined the Warriors in 1972.

=== 1974–1976: Championship contention ===
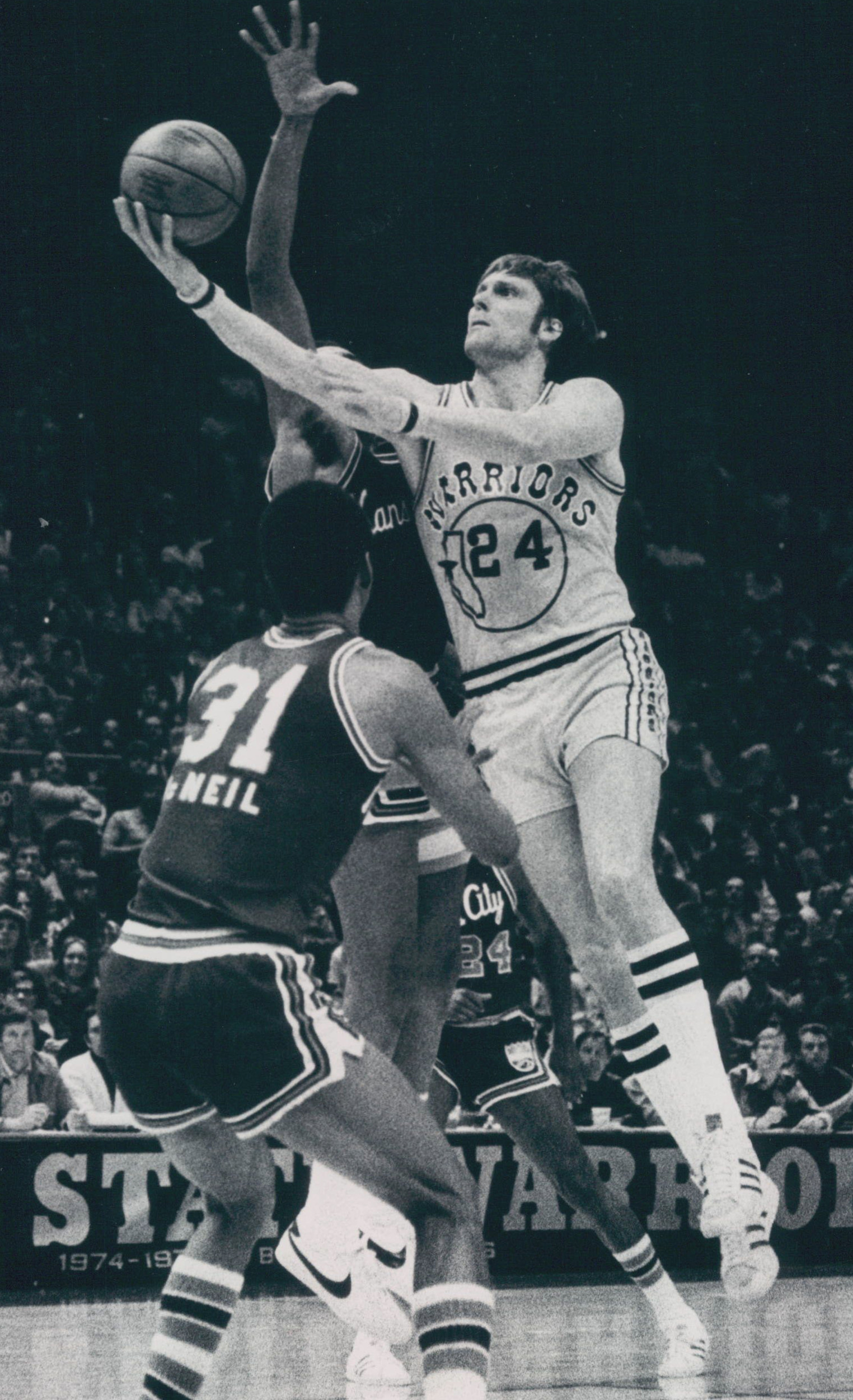
Rick Barry shown in 1976, was named the NBA Finals MVP in 1975.

The 1974–75 team was coached by former Warrior Al Attles, and was led on the court by Rick Barry and Jamaal Wilkes. Wilkes was named the NBA Rookie of the Year, while Barry had a great all-around season averaging 30.6 points per game, leading the league in both free throw percentage and steals per game, and finishing sixth in the league in assists per game. In what many consider the biggest upset in the history of the NBA, the Warriors defeated the heavily favored Washington Bullets in a four-game sweep. So little was felt of the team's chances in the playoffs, even by their home fans, that the Coliseum Arena scheduled other events during the dates of the NBA playoffs. As a result, the Warriors did not play their championship series playoff games in Oakland; rather, they played at the Cow Palace in Daly City. Barry averaged 29.5 points per game during the Finals and was named the NBA Finals MVP.

At 59–23, the Warriors had the league's best record during the 1975–76 season. They were upset, however, by the 42–40 Phoenix Suns in seven games in the Western Conference Finals.

=== 1976–1985: Collapse and resurgence ===
Because of the loss of key players such as Barry, Wilkes and Thurmond, to bad trades and retirements, along with the poor business decision not to offer Gus Williams a mere $175,000, the Warriors would struggle to put a competitive team on the court from 1978 to 1987 following their time as one of the NBA's dominant teams during the 1960s and through most of the early and mid 1970s. They would, however, through the draft acquire such standout players such as high-scoring forward Purvis Short (1978), former Georgetown Hoyas point guard Eric "Sleepy" Floyd (1982) (who would later become an All-Star before being traded to the Houston Rockets), and former Purdue University standout center Joe Barry Carroll (1980) whose once promising career would be short-circuited because of injury, as well as center Robert Parish (1976), whom they would trade to the Boston Celtics in 1980.

The departure of these players for various reasons symbolized the franchise's futility during this period, as head coach Al Attles would move up into the front office to become the team's general manager in 1980, and the team would go through several coaching changes. However, with Attles installed as general manager, they would finally manage to climb back to respectability by hiring former Cleveland Cavaliers head coach George Karl as head coach in 1986. They would also find a diamond in the rough, of sorts, that would change the direction of the franchise, drafting St. John's University standout sharpshooting small forward Chris Mullin in the 1985 NBA draft.

=== 1985–1997: The "Run TMC" era ===
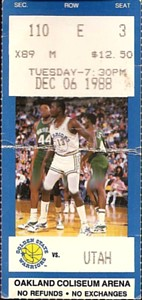
A ticket for a 1988–89 game between the Warriors and the Jazz

After a subpar stretch in the late 1970s and early 1980s, the team had a brief resurgence with coach Karl, culminating in a famous 1987 Western Conference Semifinal match against Magic Johnson's Lakers, which is still shown on TV in the NBA's Greatest Games series. In the game, the Warriors' NBA All-Star point guard Sleepy Floyd had an amazing performance in the second half, which is still the NBA playoff record for points scored in a quarter (29) and in a half (39). Floyd scored 12 consecutive field goals in the fourth quarter, finishing the game with 51 points, and leading the Warriors to victory. The "Sleepy Floyd Game" was a catalyst for increased interest in the NBA in the Bay Area, which was furthered by new coach Don Nelson who engineered another successful string of wins in the late 1980s to early 1990s with the high scoring trio of point guard Tim Hardaway, guard Mitch Richmond, and forward Chris Mullin (collectively known as "Run TMC" after the rap group Run-D.M.C.). Most notably, the Warriors twice achieved first-round playoff upsets as a seventh-seeded team, first in 1989 when they eliminated Karl Malone and the Utah Jazz, and in 1991 when they took down David Robinson's San Antonio Spurs. However, coach Don Nelson wishing to get frontcourt players to complement his run-and-gun system, made a trade that broke up the Run TMC core by sending Richmond to the Sacramento Kings for Billy Owens. Richmond went on to become a multiple-time All-Star with the Kings while Owens never lived up to his potential. The 1991–92 Warriors finished with 55 wins, their best season since 1976, and earned Nelson Coach of the Year honors. However, the Warriors were ousted in the first round by the Gary Payton-led Seattle SuperSonics. Nelson was brought to the team by Jim Fitzgerald, who owned the team between 1986 and 1995. The following year, 1993–94, with first-round draft pick and Rookie of the Year Chris Webber playing alongside Latrell Sprewell, the Warriors made the playoffs.

The season after that, however, saw a rift form between Webber, Sprewell and Nelson. All three soon left the team, and the organization went into a tailspin. 1994–95 was the first season under former team owner Chris Cohan. The Warriors earned the first overall pick in the 1995 NBA draft, but chose Joe Smith over future all-stars Kevin Garnett, Rasheed Wallace, Jerry Stackhouse and Antonio McDyess. Smith would play with the Warriors until 1998 before playing for 12 other teams in 16 seasons. Hardaway was then traded to the Miami Heat midway through the 1995–96 season, and the Warriors under head coach Rick Adelman won only 36 games that season. While the Oakland Coliseum underwent a complete renovation, the 1996–97 Golden State Warriors played their home games in the San Jose Arena in San Jose, California, struggling to a 30–52 finish. Sprewell was suspended for the remainder of the 1997–98 season for choking head coach P. J. Carlesimo during a team practice in December 1997. He would not play until he was dealt in January 1999 to the New York Knicks for John Starks, Chris Mills and Terry Cummings. Meanwhile, Mullin was traded to the Indiana Pacers during the 1997 offseason, severing the last link to the Run TMC era.

=== 1997–2009: Wilderness years ===
Garry St. Jean became the new Warriors general manager in July 1997; he and Dave Twardzik received much of the blame for the Warriors' struggles following the start of Chris Cohan's tenure, including Cohan himself. St. Jean brought in several players, such as Terry Cummings, John Starks, and Mookie Blaylock, who were well past their primes. Twardzik drafted several flops, such as Todd Fuller and Steve Logan (who never played an NBA game). In the following draft, the team selected Adonal Foyle while Tracy McGrady was still available. St. Jean did, however, draft the future 2-time NBA slam dunk champion Jason Richardson (from Michigan State), who would become a key player on the team until the end of the 2006–07 season.

The team also saw a change of visual identity, with a new logo featuring a lightning bolt, that eventually brought in a superhero mascot, Thunder, who remained with the team until the emergence of the Oklahoma City Thunder forced its retirement.

For a few years, with rising stars Jason Richardson, Antawn Jamison and guard Gilbert Arenas leading the team, the Warriors seemed like a team on the rise. In the end the young Warriors just did not have enough in the ultra-competitive Western Conference. After the 2002–03 season, Garry St. Jean's earlier mistakes of committing money to players like Danny Fortson, Adonal Foyle and Erick Dampier were painfully felt by Warriors fans when the team was unable to re-sign up-and-coming star Gilbert Arenas, despite Arenas's desire to stay in the Bay Area.

After spending two years in the Warriors front office as a special assistant, Chris Mullin succeeded Garry St. Jean and assumed the title of Executive Vice President of Basketball Operations. Among his first moves were the hiring of three former teammates to help run the organization: Mitch Richmond (special assistant), Mario Elie (assistant coach) and Rod Higgins (general manager). Mullin hoped to build the team around Jason Richardson, Mike Dunleavy Jr., and Troy Murphy—complementing them with experience in Derek Fisher, a free agent signed by Golden State after playing a key role on three championship Lakers squads, Calbert Cheaney, a playoff-tested sharpshooter and Adonal Foyle, an excellent shot-blocker who is perhaps better known for his off-court work as founder of the campaign finance reform organization, Democracy Matters. The team also drafted 7-foot center Andris Biedriņš from Latvia (11th overall). At the 2005 trading deadline, Mullin further added to the team by acquiring guard Baron Davis, bringing the team its first "superstar" since Mullin himself.

Warriors fans hoped that 2005–06 would finally be the season that the team ended their playoff drought. Despite the poor play of newly re-signed Mike Dunleavy Jr. and the broken hand of first round draft pick Ike Diogu, the Warriors enjoyed a great start to the 2005–06 season. They entered the new year with a winning percentage for the first time since 1994, but lost their first five games of 2006 and managed to win only 13 more games through the end of March. Star Baron Davis often found himself at odds with coach Mike Montgomery. Furthermore, Davis failed to remain healthy and played in just 54 games. He suffered a sprained right ankle in mid-February and did not return for long before being listed as an inactive player the remainder of the season. The injury-prone Davis had not played a full season since the 2001–02 campaign until the 2007–08 season in which he played all 82 games averaging 21.8 points a game (incidentally a contract year). On April 5, 2006, the Warriors were officially eliminated from playoff contention with a 114–109 overtime loss to the Hornets, extending their playoff drought to 12 seasons.

During the off-season, the Warriors rebuilt themselves. First in the 2006 NBA draft, the Warriors selected center Patrick O'Bryant with the 9th overall selection. They also traded Derek Fisher to the Utah Jazz for guards Devin Brown, Andre Owens and Keith McLeod, and signed training-camp invitees Matt Barnes, Anthony Roberson and Dajuan Wagner. Brown, Owens, Wagner, Roberson, Chris Taft and Will Bynum were all waived while Barnes established himself in the rotation. Golden State also announced that it had bought out the remaining two years of head coach Mike Montgomery's contract and hired previous Golden State and former Dallas Mavericks coach Don Nelson to take over in his place.

==== 2006–07: The "We Believe" era ====
Entering the 2006–07 season, the Warriors held the active record (12) for the most consecutive seasons without a playoff appearance (see Active NBA non-playoff appearance streaks). The 2006–07 season brought new hope to the Warriors and the Warriors faithful. Fans hoped that the Warriors will eventually find themselves among the NBA's elite with Don Nelson leading a healthy Baron Davis, an ever-improving Jason Richardson, and future stars Monta Ellis and Andris Biedriņš.

On January 17, 2007, Golden State traded Troy Murphy, Mike Dunleavy Jr., Ike Diogu, and Keith McLeod to the Indiana Pacers for forward Al Harrington, forward/guard Stephen Jackson, guard Šarūnas Jasikevičius, and forward Josh Powell. Many Warriors fans praised general manager Chris Mullin for the trade for getting rid of considerable financial burdens in Dunleavy and Murphy. The Warriors now sought to "run and gun" their way to the playoffs with a more athletic and talented team. On January 24, the Warriors won their first game with their revamped roster, with encouraging play from Monta Ellis, Al Harrington, and Baron Davis against the New Jersey Nets, ending dramatically on a buzzer beater from Ellis.

On March 4, 2007, the Warriors suffered a 107–106 loss in Washington handing them their 6th straight loss when Gilbert Arenas hit a technical free throw with less than one second remaining. The loss dropped them to 26–35, a hole inspiring the squad to a point of total determination. March 4, 2007 marked the turning point in the Warriors season. The Warriors closed out the regular season (42–40) with a 16–5 ending run. During the run, they beat Eastern top seed Detroit Pistons 111–93, snapping their 6-game losing streak and notching their first win on the tail end of a back-to-back. The Warriors also ended the Dallas Mavericks' 17-game win streak with five players recording double digits. "We Believe" became the Warriors' slogan for the last couple months of the season and the playoffs.

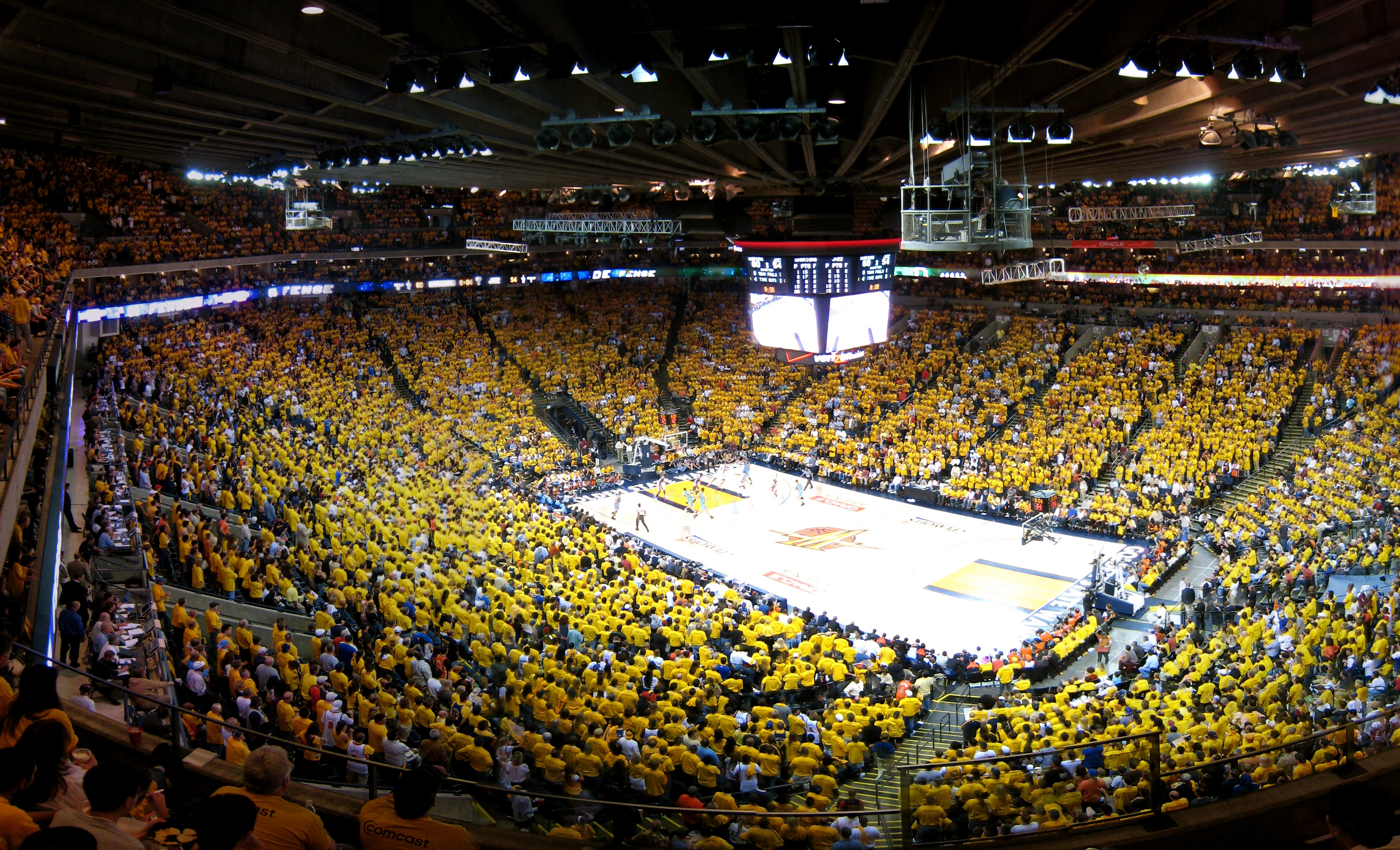
Warriors–Jazz game during the 2007 Playoffs

On April 22, 2007, the Warriors played their first playoff game in 13 years, and beat the Dallas Mavericks 97–85, holding MVP Dirk Nowitzki to just 4-of-16 shooting, making it six straight against the NBA-best, 67 game winners. But the Warriors were crushed by the Mavericks in Game 2 when both Baron Davis and Stephen Jackson were ejected from the game. Then the Warriors bounced back by winning both Games 3 and 4 at home, putting Dallas on the brink of elimination. A close Game 5 saw the Mavericks eke out a 118–112 victory to send the 3–2 series back to California. The Warriors led by nine with 2:41 left in the game, but Dallas scored 15 straight points. On May 3, 2007, the Warriors, with the help of their explosive third quarter, eliminated the Mavericks and became the first #8 seed to beat a #1 seed in a seven-game series. This was the Warriors' first playoff series win in 16 years. The Warriors went on to play the Utah Jazz in the second round of the 2006–07 playoffs.

Facing the Utah Jazz in the Conference Semifinals, the Warriors dropped two close games at EnergySolutions Arena to open the series. The Warriors had the chance to win both games late. In Game 1, Stephen Jackson missed a wide-open 3-pointer that would have put the Warriors ahead with 6 seconds left. In Game 2, the Warriors led by three with 15 seconds left, but missed free throws allowed the Jazz to tie the game and eventually win in overtime. The series then shifted to the Oracle Arena, where the Warriors won Game 3 in a convincing blowout, 125–105. Baron Davis scored 32 points and electrified the crowd with a monster dunk on Jazz forward Andrei Kirilenko late in the fourth quarter. The Warriors went on to lose Game 4 at home, in what was their first loss in Oakland in well over a month. The Jazz closed out the Warriors in Game 5 in Salt Lake City. In the end, the physical play of the Jazz simply wore down the smaller Warriors.

==== 2007–09: Roster reconstruction ====
After re-establishing itself as a playoff contender in the past season, the team set high expectations for itself. A much challenging year was foreseeable because the "We Believe" generation of Warriors had already gotten attention of the whole league. Shooting guard Jason Richardson was also traded to the Charlotte Bobcats for rookie Brandan Wright. To make things harder, Stephen Jackson received a 7-game suspension for his firearm incident. The absence of Jackson hurt the Warriors, as the team opened the season with six straight losses. Things immediately turned around with Jackson's return. The Warriors quickly fought back into playoff position. Monta Ellis's rise, Baron Davis's solid injury-free season (21.6 points, 8 assists, 4.6 rebounds per game), and an overall improvement in chemistry, led to the good play of the team after Jackson's return. It was the first time the Warriors had three players average 20 points per game since the T-M-C era (Davis at 21.7, Ellis at 20.7, Jackson at 20.1).

On January 29, 2008, the Warriors signed Chris Webber for the rest of the season. But the Warriors offense was too fast for Webber and he ended up playing only nine games. The team remained in playoff contention until the last week of the season. On April 14, 2008, the Warriors were officially eliminated from playoff contention after losing to the Phoenix Suns 122–116 in Phoenix. Despite finishing with a 48–34 record—their highest winning percentage in 14 years—they finished two games out of the playoffs in a conference where every playoff team won 50 games. The Warriors sold out nearly every home game during the season averaging 19,631 per game, the highest in team history.

On June 30, 2008, Baron Davis opted out of the last year of his contract with Golden State. Days before July 9, when teams were officially allowed to sign free agents, he had verbally agreed to a five-year, $65 million deal with the Los Angeles Clippers.

To replace Davis, Golden State offered Gilbert Arenas and Elton Brand lucrative contracts, but Arenas re-signed with the Washington Wizards and Elton Brand signed with the Philadelphia 76ers. With the 14th pick of the 2008 NBA draft, the Warriors selected and signed Anthony Randolph out of LSU. On July 10, Golden State inked Clipper free agent Corey Maggette to a five-year, $50 million deal.

On July 19, 2008, the Warriors signed Ronny Turiaf from the Los Angeles Lakers. Also, on July 22, 2008, the Warriors acquired Marcus Williams from the New Jersey Nets for a future first-round draft pick. On July 24, 2008, the Warriors resigned Monta Ellis to a new 6-year contract worth $66 million, matched the Clippers' July 17, three-year, $9 million offer for Kelenna Azubuike, and signed second round draft pick Richard Hendrix. On July 26, 2008, the Warriors also resigned Andris Biedrins with a six-year contract worth nearly $63 million (including bonuses).

On November 21, 2008, the Warriors traded forward Al Harrington to the New York Knicks for guard Jamal Crawford. On January 23, 2009, after missing 43 games due to injury and suspension, Monta Ellis returned in a loss to the Cleveland Cavaliers. He recorded 20 points to go with three rebounds, three assists, one steal and one block. On April 14, 2009, fans cheered as rookie Anthony Randolph scored 24 points with 16 boards to lead the Warriors to a 30-point loss against the San Antonio Spurs. As the youngest team in the NBA, the Warriors were ranked second in the league in scoring averaging 108.6 points per game. The Warriors had a disappointing 2008–09 season, finishing 29–53. Their record can be largely attributed to the absence of Monta Ellis in the beginning of the season, injuries and the minimal experience of the young players such as C. J. Watson, Rob Kurz, Anthony Morrow and Brandan Wright.

The Warriors' head coach Don Nelson often had to make adjustments to the starting lineups since many of the original starters missed games due to injuries. Nelson used various starting lineups during the season and it was difficult to predict who would start each game. Nelson stated at the beginning of the year that the 2008–09 season would be difficult, but saw tremendous growth among his young players, especially in rookie Anthony Randolph (14th pick in 2008 NBA draft from LSU). Randolph proved to be a consistent scoring threat, a strong defensive weapon and a promising player in the future. Lakers' forward Lamar Odom, whom Randolph has often been compared to during the season, was even impressed with Randolph's ability and complimented his performances. Despite the team's losing record, the Warriors demonstrated that they could be a tough opponent with a healthy lineup and a strong bench. The Warriors showed that with leadership and improvement in their young players, they were able to defeat powerhouse teams (such as their 99–89 win over the defending NBA Champion Boston Celtics). With the full recovery of the Warriors' starters and continued growth of the young rookies, the Warriors hoped to be a playoff contender next season.

=== 2009–present: The Stephen Curry era ===
On May 12, 2009, the Golden State Warriors decided not to renew the contract of general manager Chris Mullin. Larry Riley took over as general manager and drafted Stephen Curry with the 7th overall pick. In the 2009 off-season, the Warriors traded Jamal Crawford to the Atlanta Hawks for Acie Law and Speedy Claxton. Marco Belinelli was also traded during the off-season to the Toronto Raptors for Devean George. On August 31, 2009, the Warriors signed former Boston Celtics forward/center Mikki Moore. On November 16, 2009, Stephen Jackson and Acie Law were traded to the Charlotte Bobcats for Raja Bell and Vladimir Radmanovic. Four days later they signed center Chris Hunter.

On January 8, 2010, the Warriors waived Mikki Moore. During the month of January 2010, they signed two forwards to 10-day contracts which included, Cartier Martin from the Iowa Energy, Anthony Tolliver from the Idaho Stampede, and guard Coby Karl, the son of former Warriors head coach George Karl. On February 7, Speedy Claxton was waived and the Warriors signed Tolliver for the rest of the year. The Warriors were granted another injury exception and signed Reggie Williams from the Sioux Skyforce to a 10-day contract on March 2, 2010, making it their fifth D-League call up this year, tying an NBA record. Ten days later, they signed Williams to another 10-day contract. The Warriors eventually waived guard Raja Bell in order to sign Williams for the rest of the year. After signing Williams, it was announced that the Golden State Warriors franchise would be on sale.

The Warriors finished the season 26–56, fourth in the Pacific Division.

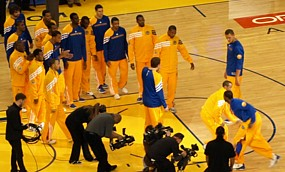
The Warriors opening the 2011–12 season

On June 24, 2010, the Warriors selected Ekpe Udoh with the 6th overall pick of the 2010 NBA draft. They also introduced a modernized version of their "The City" logo depicting the new eastern span of the San Francisco-Oakland Bay Bridge, and switched to a simplified color scheme of royal blue and gold. They also introduced new uniforms reminiscent of the 1969–71 "The City" uniforms. The Warriors made an off-season trade that sent Turiaf, Randolph and Azubuike to the New York Knicks in return for star high-scoring power forward David Lee via a sign-and-trade. Lee agreed to a six-year, $80 million deal. Following Morrow's departure after he signed the New Jersey Nets' offer sheet, the Warriors signed Dorell Wright to a three-year, $11 million deal.

On July 15, owner Chris Cohan sold the Warriors to Peter Guber of Mandalay Entertainment and his partner Joe Lacob for a then-record $450 million.

The Warriors continued their signing spree by adding Harvard guard Jeremy Lin to their roster with a one-year partially guaranteed contract containing a second-year team option, the first Taiwanese-American player in NBA history. Louis Amundson was then added for little under $5 million in mid-September. Keith Smart was hired as head coach that same month after Nelson had resigned before the start of training camp.

In February 2011, the Warriors traded Brandan Wright and Dan Gadzuric for Troy Murphy and a 2011 second-round pick. On February 27, Murphy and the Warriors reached a buyout agreement and he was waived.

During a steady season without making any real ground in the playoff race, the Warriors broke franchise records with 21 made 3's in a win against the Orlando Magic. In April 2011, Dorell Wright made a franchise record of 184 3's in a season in a home win versus Los Angeles Lakers, surpassing Richardson's 183 in 2005–06. He then broke another NBA record, as the first player to have scored more points in his seventh season than in all his first six seasons combined in a win against the Portland Trail Blazers. He ended the season with the most three-pointers made in the NBA that season with 194, as well as the most 3s attempted with 516, both of which set new Warriors franchise records.

The Warriors failed to make the playoffs after a 36-win season in 2010–11, and coach Smart was dismissed on April 27 due to the change in ownership. 17-year NBA veteran and former ABC and ESPN commentator Mark Jackson replaced him as head coach on June 6. On December 19, they traded Amundson to the Indiana Pacers for small forward Brandon Rush.

The Warriors did not improve in the 2011–12 season under coach Jackson, finishing the lockout-shorted season with a 23–43 record, 13th in the conference. The team suffered several injuries to key players, and due to the lockout, Jackson could not establish his system in training camp. They then entered into another chaotic rebuilding phase.

Team leader Monta Ellis was traded in mid-March 2012, along with Kwame Brown and Ekpe Udoh, to the Milwaukee Bucks for center Andrew Bogut (out injured for the season) and former Warriors small forward Stephen Jackson, who without playing a game for the Warriors, was quickly traded to the San Antonio Spurs for Richard Jefferson and a conditional first-round pick on March 15. These moves saw the rise of Stephen Curry and David Lee to team co-captains, and saw off-guard Klay Thompson, the 11th overall pick of the 2011 NBA draft, move into a starting role. On July 11, they acquired point guard Jarrett Jack from the New Orleans Hornets in a three-team trade also including the Philadelphia 76ers, who received Dorell Wright from Golden State. On August 1, they signed forward Carl Landry on the termination of his one-year contract with the Hornets. In the 2012 NBA draft, they selected small forward Harrison Barnes with the 7th overall pick, center Festus Ezeli with the 30th pick, small forward Draymond Green 35th overall, and 7-foot 1-inch center Ognjen Kuzmic 52nd overall. In early November, swingman Rush was lost for the year with a torn ACL after falling awkwardly on the court early in the second game of the season, and less than a month later, the team announced that Bogut was out indefinitely with a foot injury that was more serious than originally reported.

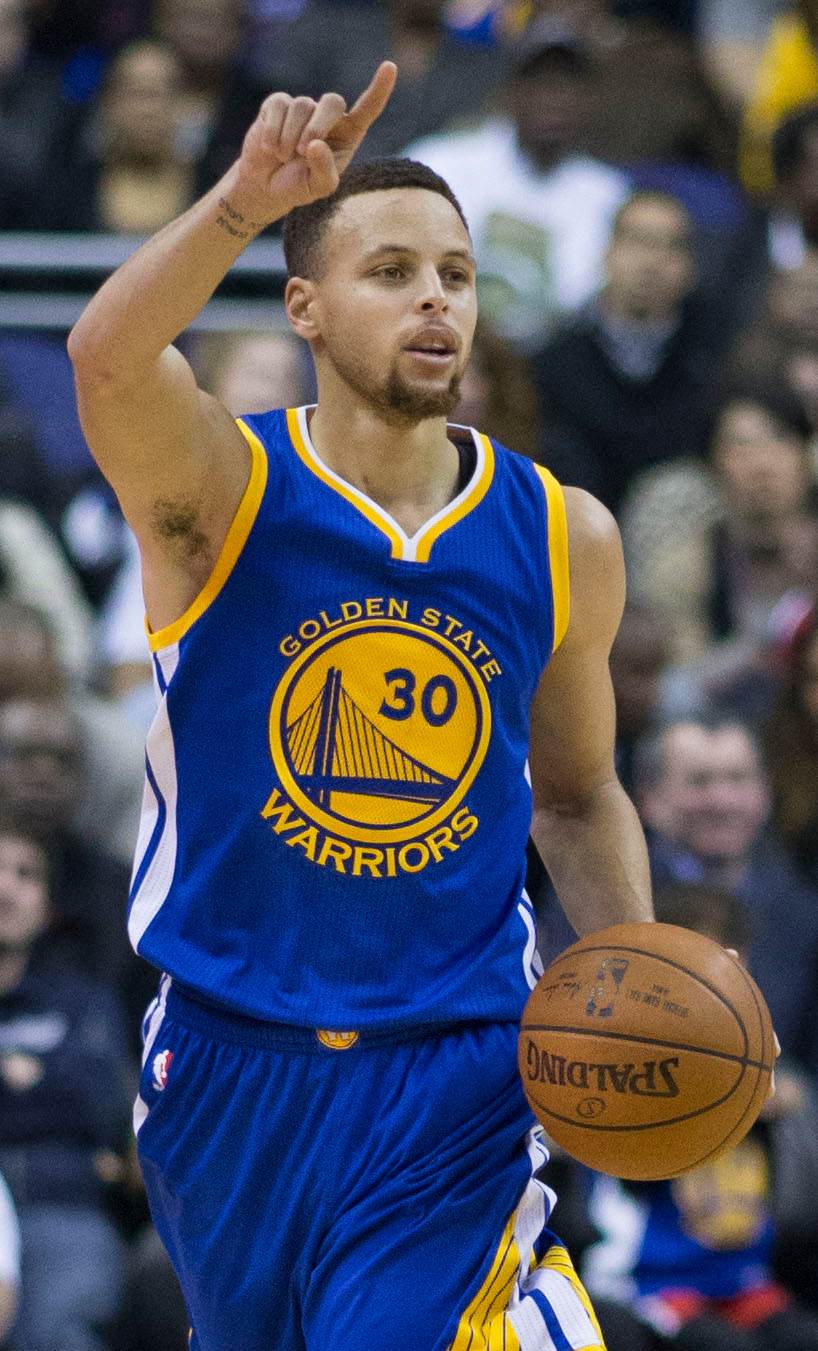
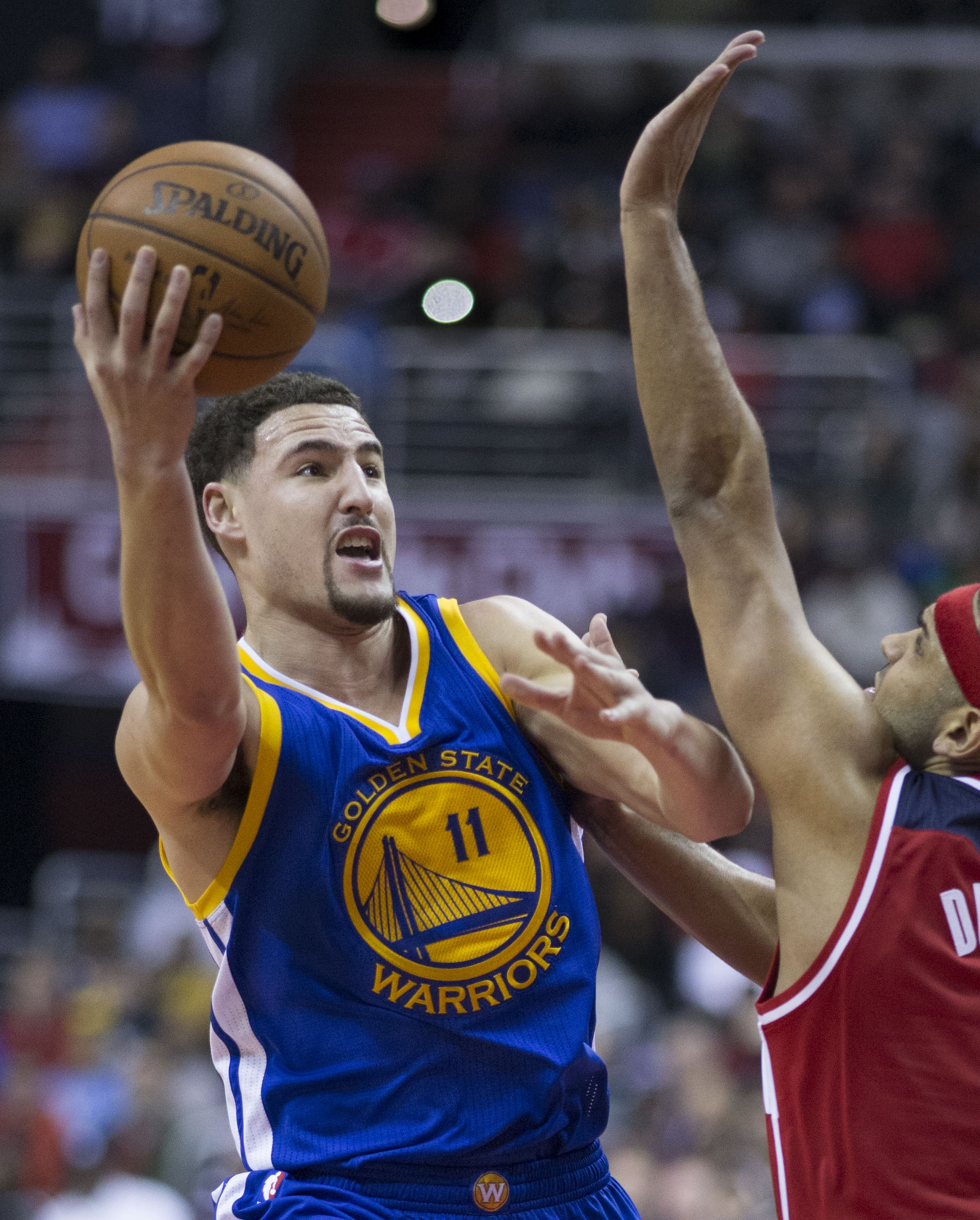
The "Splash Brothers": Stephen Curry (left) and Klay Thompson (right)

Coming out of this maelstrom of trades and injuries with a team starting two rookies (Barnes and Ezeli) in the 2012–13 season, the Warriors had one of their best starts in decades, earning their 20th win before hitting the 30-game mark for the first time since 1992. The Warriors also achieved a milestone by completing their first ever 6–1 road trip in franchise history, including a 97–95 win over the defending champion Heat in Miami. On April 9, 2013, with a win over the Minnesota Timberwolves, the Warriors clinched the playoffs for the second time in 19 years and the first time since the 2006–07 "We Believe" Warriors. This time, the local battlecry was "We Belong".

The team finished the 2012–13 season with a record of 47–35, earning the sixth seed in the Western Conference, and defeated the Denver Nuggets in the first round of the playoffs by winning four out of six games. They lost in the second round to the San Antonio Spurs, four games to two. This was the first playoff experience for all of the starters of this group except for Andrew Bogut.

Other highlights of the season included Stephen Curry's 272 three-point baskets to set an NBA single-season record, giving him the nickname "baby-faced assassin", and the naming of forward David Lee to the 2013 NBA All-Star Game as a reserve, ending the team's 16-year drought without an All Star selection, dating back to Latrell Sprewell in the 1997 season. Curry and Klay Thompson, dubbed the "Splash Brothers" by team employee Brian Witt for their backcourt shooting prowess, combined for 483 three-pointers during the season, easily besting the prior record of 435 set by the Orlando Magic's Nick Anderson and Dennis Scott in 1995–96.

With their lone selection in the 2013 NBA draft, the Warriors made 22-year-old Serbian combo-guard Nemanja Nedovic the 30th and final pick of the first round. In early July 2013, Golden State signed former Denver Nuggets swingman and free agent Andre Iguodala to a four-year, $48 million deal. To make room under their salary cap, the Warriors traded Richard Jefferson, Andris Biedrins and Brandon Rush, along with multiple draft picks, including their 2014 and 2017 first-round picks, to the Utah Jazz. The Warriors lost free-agent guard Jarrett Jack, who departed for the Cleveland Cavaliers, and free agent power forward Carl Landry, who went to the Sacramento Kings. To help fill the void left by Landry, the Warriors signed forward-center Marreese Speights to a three-year, $10 million contract. The team also signed one-year deals with veteran center Jermaine O'Neal ($2 million) and point guard Toney Douglas ($1.6 million). On August 21, the Warriors signed 7'1" Serbian center Ognjen Kuzmic, who had been playing in Europe since his selection in the 2012 NBA draft, to a guaranteed two-year deal.

The Warriors began the 2013–14 season inconsistently. By early December, they held a 12–9 record, compared to 17–4 at the same point the previous season. The team faced a challenging early schedule, playing 14 of its first 22 games on the road, including 10 against teams in playoff position at the time.

Injuries also affected the team’s performance. Festus Ezeli missed the season following right knee surgery, Toney Douglas was sidelined for nearly a month with a left tibia stress reaction, and Jermaine O’Neal underwent right wrist surgery that kept him out from mid-November to early February. Stephen Curry and Harrison Barnes each missed at least four games prior to the All-Star break due to minor injuries. Andre Iguodala sustained a hamstring injury in late November and was sidelined for over a month, during which the Warriors posted a 5–7 record.

Following Iguodala’s return, the Warriors recorded a 10-game winning streak, including six consecutive road victories during a single road trip, tying an NBA record. The streak was the franchise’s longest since the 1974–75 championship season and fell one game short of the team record of 11 consecutive wins set in 1971–72.

To strengthen their underperforming bench, the Warriors made a three-team trade on January 15, sending Douglas to the Miami Heat and picking up guards Jordan Crawford and MarShon Brooks from the Boston Celtics and then, a day before the trade deadline, trading Kent Bazemore and Brooks to the Los Angeles Lakers in exchange for veteran point guard Steve Blake. Thanks in part to the improved effectiveness of their backup squad, boosted by the additions of Blake and Crawford and the play of 35-year-old Jermaine O'Neal (who returned sooner than expected from wrist surgery), the Warriors were one of the winningest teams in the NBA after the all-star break. Nonetheless, and despite several victories over top contenders, the team displayed a pattern of losing games to inferior teams even at their home arena. On April 11, in a 112–95 stomping of the Los Angeles Lakers at the Staples Center, the Warriors clinched a playoff berth in consecutive seasons for the first time since 1991 and 1992. However, just one day earlier in a loss against the Portland Trail Blazers, Andrew Bogut suffered a cracked rib that would keep him out of the postseason, a big blow to the sixth-seed Warriors' playoff hopes.

The Warriors finished the 2013–14 season with a 51–31 record, surpassing 50 wins for only the fourth time in franchise history. They also finished 20 games over .500 for the first time in 22 years and tied the 1991–92 team for the franchise record of 24 road victories. Despite the absence of Andrew Bogut, the Warriors faced the third-seeded Los Angeles Clippers in the first round of the playoffs. The series went to a decisive seventh game, which the Warriors lost, ending their season.

The season featured numerous closely contested games. The Warriors played 17 regular-season games decided by two points or fewer, including six games won on shots made in the final three seconds. They also recorded seven comeback victories after trailing by 15 points or more.

In other noteworthy occurrences for the season, Curry was named to the starting lineup for the 2014 NBA All-Star Game. For Curry, the only Warrior named to the team, this was his first all-star appearance in five seasons as an NBA player. Curry hit another notable milestone in posting four triple-doubles for the season, tying a franchise record unequaled since Wilt Chamberlain in 1963–64. Curry also averaged career-bests in points and assists; averaging 24.0 points and 8.5 assists in the season. Curry and Klay Thompson continued to set league records in three-point shooting. On February 7, in a 102–87 win over the Chicago Bulls, the backcourt duo became the first teammates to each make a three-pointer in 30 consecutive games. Curry, who finished the season with 261 threes, set an individual record for most three-pointers in a span of two seasons with 533, surpassing the previous mark of 478 set by Seattle Supersonic Ray Allen in 2004–05 and 2005–06. Together, Thompson and Curry combined for 484 threes on the year, besting by one the NBA record they had set the year before.

==== 2014–15: First title in 40 years and first MVP in 55 years ====
On May 14, 2014, the Golden State Warriors named Steve Kerr the team's head coach, in a reported $25 million deal over five years. It was a first-time head-coaching position for Kerr, 48, a five-time NBA champion point guard who holds the all-time career record for accuracy in three-point shooting (.454). Kerr formerly served as president and general manager for the Phoenix Suns basketball team (2007 to 2010), and had most recently been working as an NBA broadcast analyst for Turner Network Television (TNT).

The Warriors completed the 2014–15 season with a record of 67–15, the best in the league and the most wins in franchise history. The Warriors also finished with a home record of 39–2, the second best in NBA history. They were first in defensive efficiency for the season and second in offensive efficiency, barely missing the mark that the Julius Erving led Sixers achieved by being first in both offensive and defensive efficiency. On May 4, Stephen Curry was named the 2014–15 NBA Most Valuable Player, the first Warrior to do so since Wilt Chamberlain in 1960. In the first round of the playoffs, they swept the New Orleans Pelicans, defeated Memphis Grizzlies in the second round in six games and defeated Houston Rockets in five games of the Western Conference Finals. The Warriors advanced to their first NBA Finals since 1975, where they defeated the injury-plagued Cleveland Cavaliers in six games to win their fourth NBA title, and their first in 40 years. Andre Iguodala was named Finals MVP.

Other highlights of the season included Stephen Curry breaking his own record for three-pointers made in a single season with 286. He and Klay Thompson made a combined 525 three-pointers, the most by a duo in NBA history. In the postseason, Curry shattered Reggie Miller's record of 58 made three-pointers in a single postseason with 98. On January 23, 2015, Klay Thompson broke an NBA record for points in a quarter with 37 in the third. Curry was also the leader in the voting polls for the 2015 NBA All-Star Game, won the 2014–15 NBA Most Valuable Player award and the 2015 ESPYs Best Male Athlete award.

==== 2015–16: 73–9 record and NBA Finals defeat ====
The Warriors began the 2015–16 season by winning their first 24 games, eclipsing the previous best start in NBA history, set by the 1993–94 Houston Rockets and the 1948–49 Washington Capitols at 15–0. The Warriors surpassed the 1969–70 New York Knicks for the best road start in NBA history at 14–0, which is also the joint-third longest road win streak. Their record-setting start ended when they were defeated by the Milwaukee Bucks on December 12, 2015. The Warriors broke a 131-year-old record of 20–0 set by the 1884 St. Louis Maroons baseball team, to claim the best start to a season in all of the major professional sports in America. Golden State also won 28 consecutive regular season games dating back to the 2014–15 season, eclipsing the 2012–13 Miami Heat for the second longest winning streak in NBA history. The team set an NBA record 54-straight regular season home game winning streak, which spanned from January 31, 2015, to March 29, 2016. The previous record of 44 was held by the 1995–96 Chicago Bulls team led by Michael Jordan.

Stephen Curry, Draymond Green and Klay Thompson were all named to the All-Star Game, the first time the Warriors have had three All-Stars since 1976. Green broke the Golden State franchise record of nine triple-doubles in a season. Curry broke numerous three-point records during the season, including his own NBA record for made three-pointers in a season of 286; he finished the season with 402 three-pointers. He made a three-pointer in 151 consecutive games, which broke the NBA record of 127 set by Kyle Korver in 2014. On February 27, 2016, Curry also tied the NBA record of twelve three-pointers made in a single game, jointly holding it with Donyell Marshall and Kobe Bryant. On April 3, 2016, the Warriors won their 69th game of the season by defeating the Portland Trail Blazers at home, and became the fourth team in NBA history to reach 69 wins in a single season, joining the 1971–72 Los Angeles Lakers, 1995–96 Chicago Bulls and 1996–97 Chicago Bulls.

On April 13, 2016, Golden State set the record for most wins in a single season, beating Memphis 125–104 and finishing the regular season 73–9. Since the game occurred at the same time as Kobe Bryant's final career game with the Los Angeles Lakers, both games gained competitions in terms of ratings and viewership. On May 10, 2016, Stephen Curry was named the NBA Most Valuable Player for the second straight season. Curry is the 11th player to win back-to-back MVP honors and became the first player in NBA history to win the MVP award by unanimous vote, winning all 131 first-place votes. Golden State defeated the Houston Rockets in five games in the first round, the Portland Trail Blazers in five in the second round, and finally, the Oklahoma City Thunder, led by future Warriors legend Kevin Durant, in seven games in the Conference Finals, rallying from a 3–1 deficit. The Golden State Warriors went to their second consecutive appearance in the finals with a rematch against the Cleveland Cavaliers. The Warriors went to a 3–1 advantage, but the Cavaliers won the next three games to force a Game 7, which featured LeBron James blocking Andre Iguodala's layup attempt. The Cavaliers went on to win the game 93–89, ending the Cleveland sports curse. The Warriors were the first team to lose the NBA Finals after taking 3–1 lead.

==== 2016–18: The Dynasty – Death Lineup, back-to-back titles, and further success ====
"Death Lineup" (2015–2019)

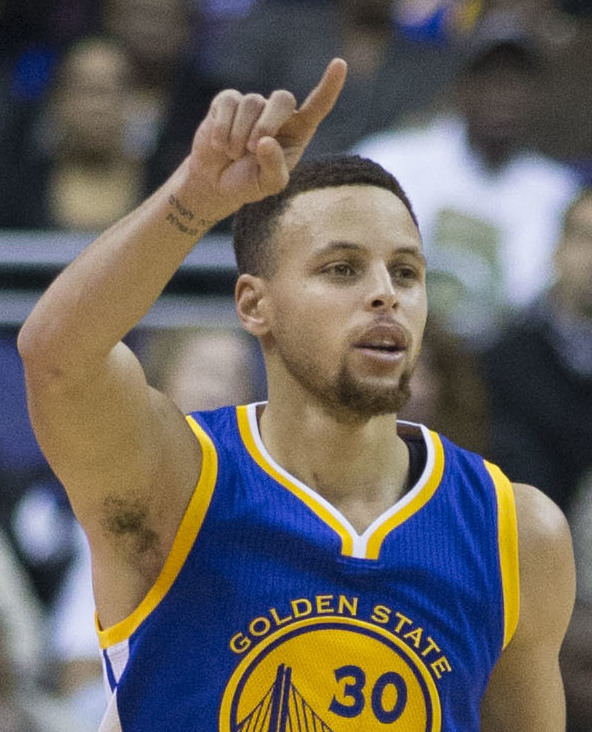
Stephen Curry

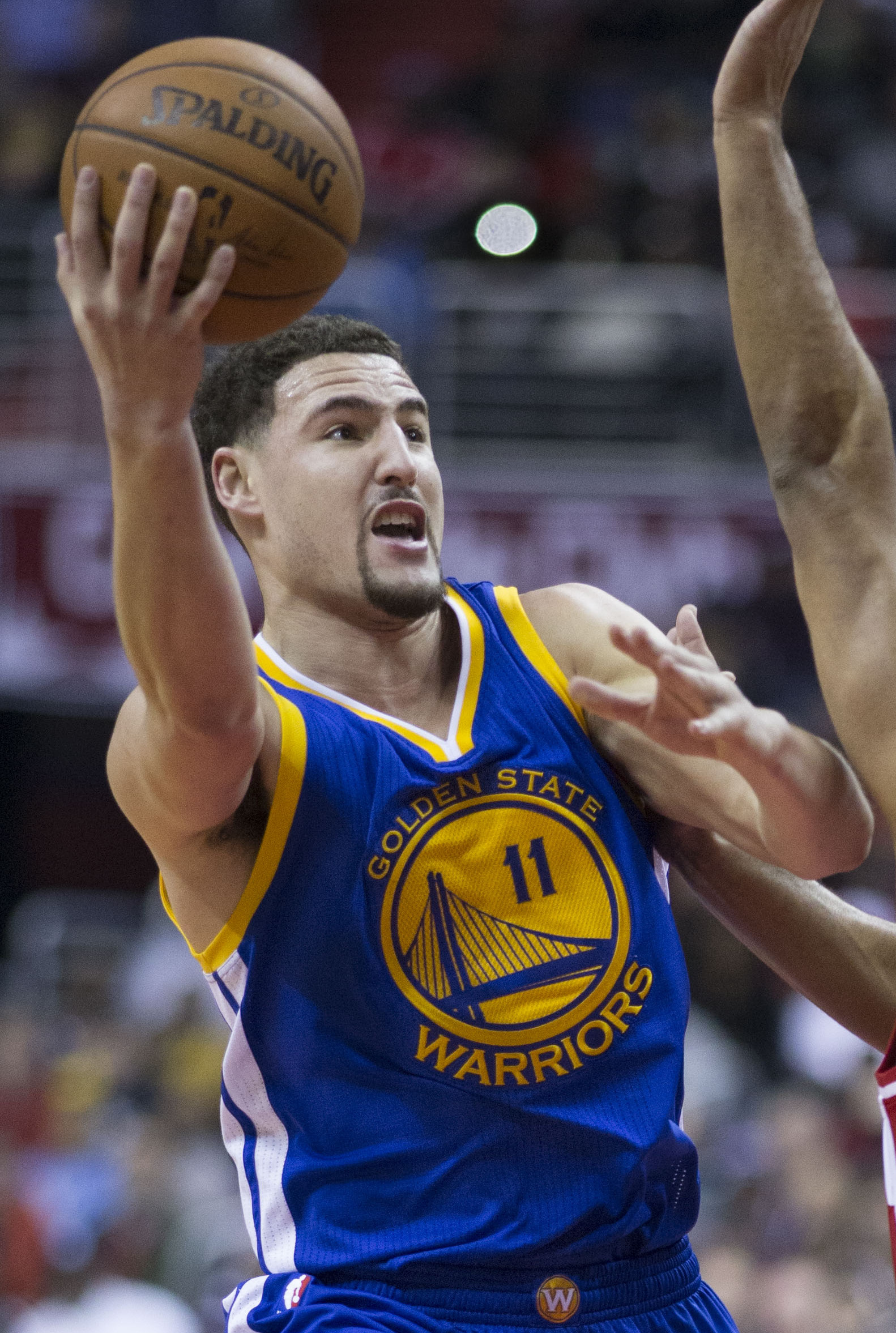
Klay Thompson

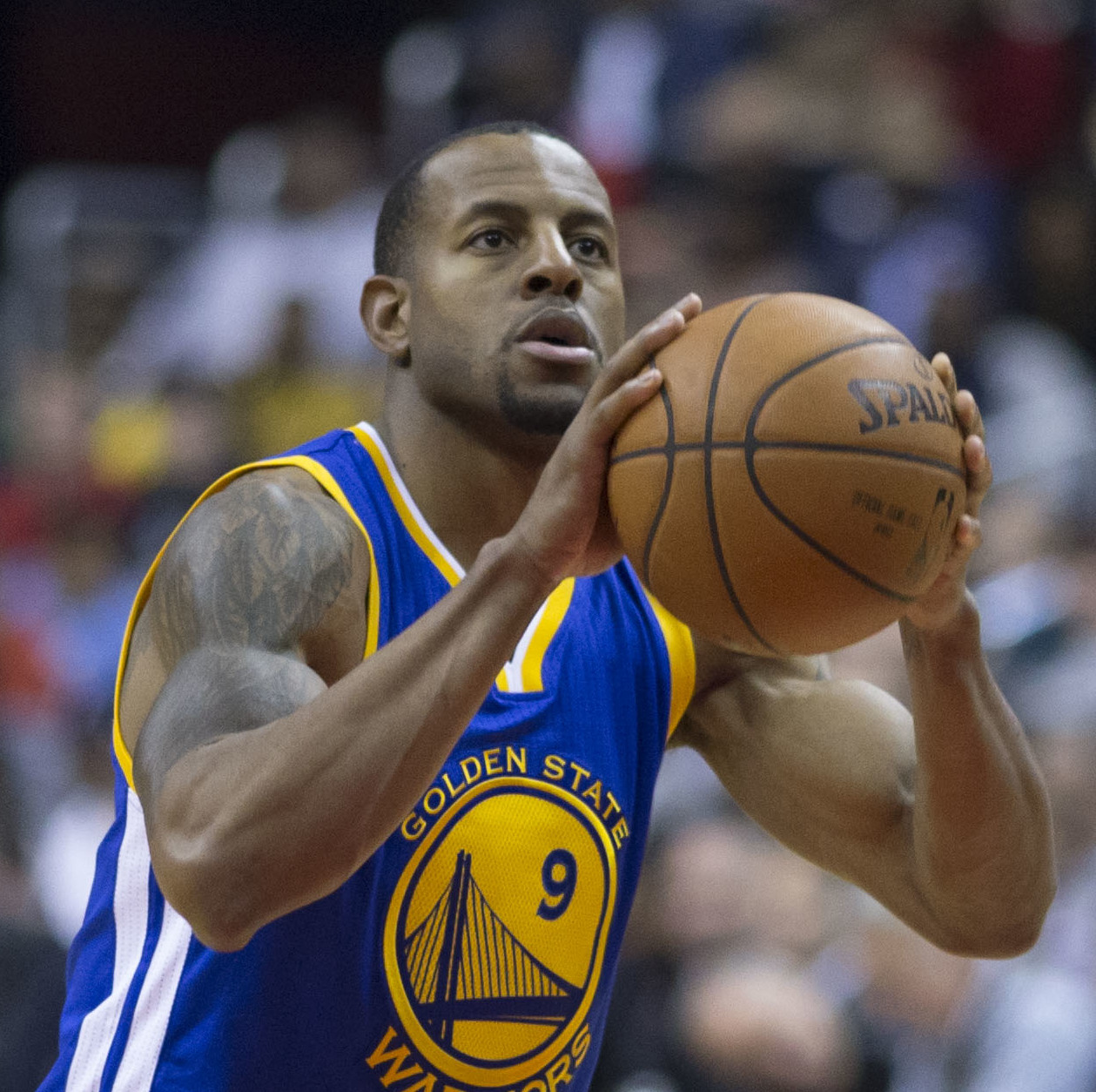
Andre Iguodala

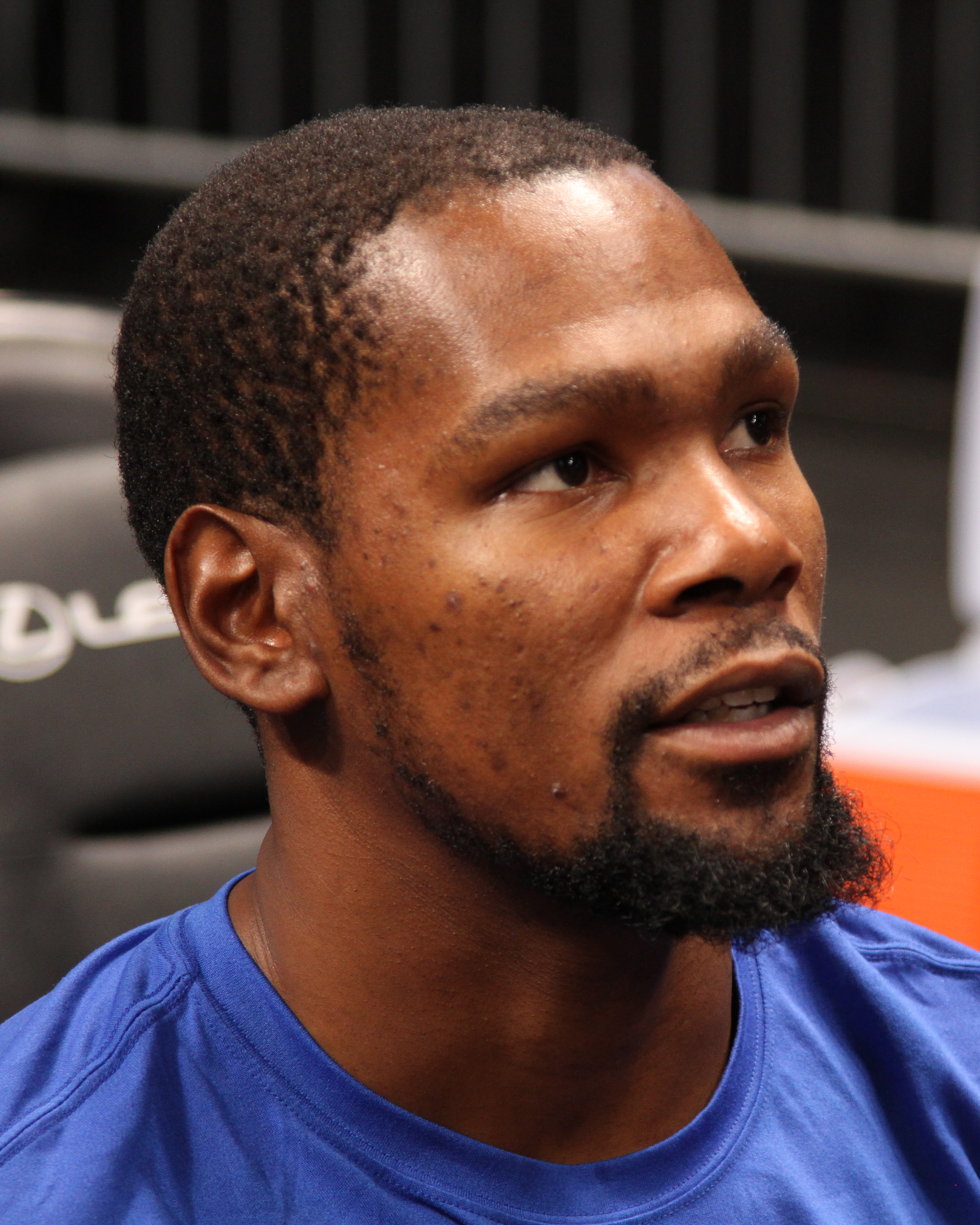
Kevin Durant

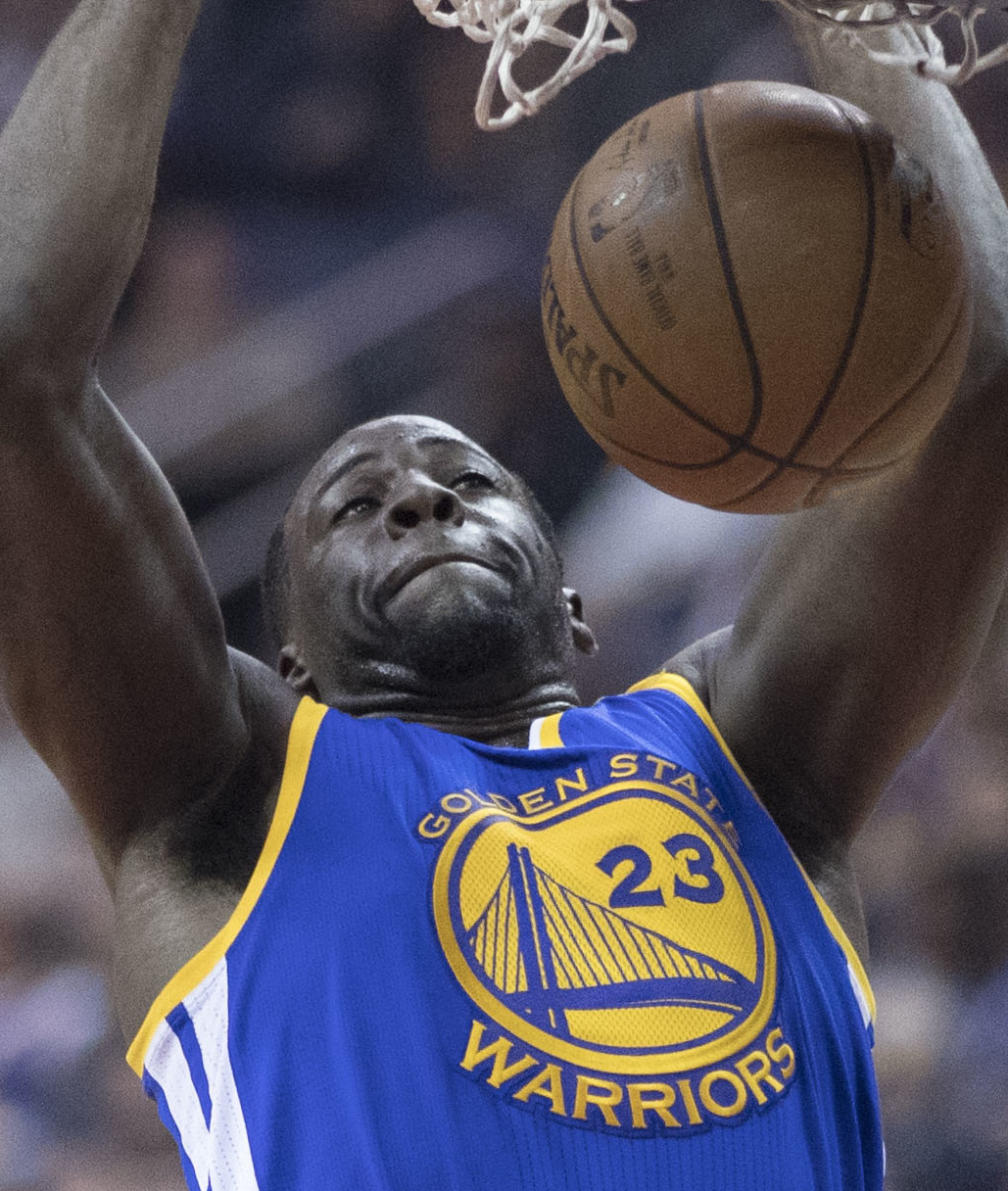
Draymond Green

On July 4, 2016, Kevin Durant announced he would leave the Oklahoma City Thunder in order to sign a 2-year contract with the Golden State Warriors. On July 7, Durant signed his contract, which gave the Warriors a fourth All-NBA player on their team. The Durant signing made the Warriors the prohibitive favorites to win the NBA championship, according to oddsmakers.

The Warriors posted many notable achievements during the 2016–17 regular season. On November 7, 2016, Stephen Curry set the NBA record for most 3-pointers in a game with 13, in a 116–106 win over the Pelicans. On December 5, 2016, Klay Thompson scored 60 points in 29 minutes, in a 142–106 victory over the Pacers. In doing so, Thompson became the first player in NBA history to score 60 or more points in fewer than 30 minutes of playing time. Stephen Curry, Kevin Durant, Draymond Green, and Klay Thompson were all named to the 2017 NBA All-Star Game, making the Warriors only the eighth team in NBA history to have four All-Stars. On February 10, 2017, Draymond Green recorded a triple-double with 12 rebounds, 10 assists, and 10 steals, becoming the first player in NBA history to post a triple-double with fewer than 10 points. On March 2, 2017, the Warriors' streak for most games without back-to-back losses ended at 146 with a 94–87 loss to the Chicago Bulls. The streak eclipsed the previous record of 95 held by the Utah Jazz.

The Warriors earned home-court advantage throughout the 2017 playoffs, thanks to a 2016–17 regular season record of 67–15. They were the first team in NBA playoff history to start 12–0, defeating in order the Trail Blazers, the Jazz, and the Spurs. The 2017 Finals once again pitted the Warriors against the Cavaliers, becoming the first time in NBA history that two teams met in the Finals for three consecutive years, and launching their great rivalry. The Warriors won the championship after going 4–1 in the Finals, and their 16–1 playoff record garnered the best winning percentage (.941) in NBA playoffs history. Kevin Durant was named the Finals MVP award after he scored at least 30 points in all five NBA Finals games and averaging 35.2 points per game. The victory at Oracle Arena to secure the title was the first title victory by a Bay Area team at home since the Oakland Athletics won the World Series in the Oakland–Alameda Coliseum in 1974, capping off a three-peat World Series run.

The Warriors finished the regular season 58–24, third best in the league and the second best in the conference. They defeated the San Antonio Spurs in five games in the first round, the New Orleans Pelicans in the second round, and, finally, the Houston Rockets, the team with the best NBA record, in the conference finals in seven games. This led to the fourth consecutive Finals matchup with the Cavaliers.

On June 8, 2018, the Golden State Warriors swept the Cleveland Cavaliers in four games, becoming the ninth team to have swept their rivals in NBA Finals history. They have established themselves as a dynasty with their second consecutive championship and third in the past four years. The 2018 Finals also marks the first sweep since the 2007 NBA Finals.

==== 2018–19: Fifth straight Finals, Death Lineup's collapse, and final season in Oakland ====
The Warriors finished the 2018–19 regular season with a 57–25 record, winning the Pacific Division and securing the 1st seed in the Western Conference. In the playoffs, Golden State defeated the Los Angeles Clippers in six games in the first round, defeated the Houston Rockets in six games in the Western Conference semifinals, and the Portland Trail Blazers in four games in the Western Conference Finals to reach the 2019 NBA Finals, their fifth consecutive Finals. The Raptors were leading the series 3–1, before the Warriors cut this to 3–2 with a Game 5 win. In Game 6, Klay Thompson tore his ACL during the third quarter and was sidelined for the rest of the game, as the Warriors went on to lose the game 114–110. This marked their last season in Oracle Arena, later renamed Oakland Arena.

After the 2019 NBA Finals, the Death Lineup and the "Hamptons Five" era ended when Kevin Durant left the Warriors for the Brooklyn Nets and Andre Iguodala was traded to the Memphis Grizzlies.

== 2019–present: Return to San Francisco ==
=== 2019–20: Injury struggles ===
During the 2019 off-season, the Warriors, who played their home games in Oakland, California, since 1971, moved to the newly built Chase Center in San Francisco, California, before the start of the 2019–20 NBA season. With injuries to Stephen Curry and Klay Thompson, the Warriors regressed, finishing with a league-worst 15–50 record, their first losing season since 2012, before the season was suspended due to the ongoing COVID-19 pandemic. The Warriors were not invited to the 2020 NBA Bubble.

=== 2020–21: Continued struggles and Play-in contention ===
The next season saw the Warriors draft James Wiseman with the second overall pick in the 2020 NBA draft; however, the outlook was bleak when Klay Thompson ruptured his Achilles tendon while playing a pickup game in Los Angeles, again ending his season before it started. Stephen Curry led the league in scoring and was in the MVP discussion between Philadelphia's Joel Embiid and Denver's Nikola Jokić who would go on to win the award. But this wouldn't stop the Warriors from back-to-back play-in tournament losses against the Lakers and Memphis and for the second consecutive year they missed the playoffs.

=== 2021–22: The Comeback – Return to the finals and seventh championship ===
During the 2021–22 NBA season, Stephen Curry was selected into the NBA 75th Anniversary Team, along with four other players, retired and current, that have played for the Warriors. Curry also set two three-point records: the most three-pointers made in NBA history in the regular season and the most three-pointers made both regular season and playoffs combined, both of which were formerly held by Ray Allen. Klay Thompson also returned after suffering a torn ACL in his left leg during Game 6 of the 2019 NBA Finals and rupturing his right Achilles tendon before the 2020–21 NBA season. The Warriors, with a 53–29 record, finished third in the Western Conference and reached the NBA Playoffs for the first time since the 2019 postseason. This would also be the first playoffs held at Chase Center. In the playoffs, Golden State defeated the Denver Nuggets in five games in the first round, defeated the second-seeded Memphis Grizzlies in six games in the Western Conference Semifinals, and defeated the Dallas Mavericks in five games the Western Conference Finals.

On May 26, 2022, the Warriors became the Western Conference Champions for the sixth time in the Curry era and clinched a spot in the 2022 NBA Finals, where they faced the Boston Celtics in a rematch of the 1964 NBA Finals when Boston beat the then-San Francisco Warriors in five games. They beat the Celtics in six games to win their fourth championship in eight years. Stephen Curry also won his first NBA Finals Most Valuable Player Award and won his fourth championship along with Klay Thompson, Draymond Green, and Andre Iguodala.

=== 2022–23: Injuries and roster inconsistencies ===
During the 2022–23 season, the Warriors faced a challenging regular season due to numerous injuries. Key players like Iguodala, Donte DiVincenzo, Thompson, Green, Jonathan Kuminga, and Curry, who was also unable to participate in the 2023 NBA All-Star Game, were impacted.

However, despite the team's average performance throughout the season, the San Francisco-based squad displayed remarkable determination and resilience. They ultimately finished with the sixth seed and a 44–38 record, qualifying for the last direct playoff spot. In the first round, the Warriors defeated the Sacramento Kings in seven games. During the series, the Warriors lost the first two games, including Game 1 by a narrow victory, in which Curry missed his game-tying 3 pointer. The Warriors won the next three games before Sacramento dominated in Game 6 to force a Game 7. In the deciding game, Curry scored 50 points in a 120–100 victory, giving him the most points scored in a Game 7. Although this record was broken shortly after by the Boston Celtics' Jayson Tatum, Curry remained the first ever player to score 50 points in a series-clinching Game 7. His 50 points surpassed the 48 points record by former teammate Kevin Durant in 2021. With the win, the Warriors advanced to the next round, where they lost to the Los Angeles Lakers in six games.
