= Sportsvue =

Former regional sports network in Wisconsin, United States

- Country: United States
- Broadcast area: Wisconsin

Programming
- Language: American English

Ownership
- Owner: Milwaukee Bucks, Milwaukee Brewers

History
- Launched: April 3, 1984
- Closed: February 2, 1985

Sportsvue was a regional sports network operating in Wisconsin. The premium cable channel showed telecasts of sporting events, principally those involving the Milwaukee Brewers and Milwaukee Bucks. Sportsvue operated from April 3, 1984 to February 2, 1985, closing in the middle of the Bucks season due to the losses incurred in its brief period of operation and inability to attract a sufficient subscriber base. Within days of Sportsvue's closure, the Bucks were put up for sale.

== History ==
=== Pre-launch ===
In 1981, the Bucks and Brewers announced plans to launch a cable sports channel known as the Wisconsin All-Sports Network as a complement to the games carried by broadcast TV stations; the network would also carry collegiate sports events and would have launched as soon as 1983. Plans for WASN were rolled into a larger and more ambitious effort of Group W Satellite Communications, known as "The Sports Network", in 1983. TSN (no relation to the Canadian network of the same name that launched in 1984) was to incorporate WASN, as well as Pro-Am Sports System in Detroit, Sportsvision in Chicago, Sonics Superchannel in the Pacific Northwest, and a new channel in the mid-Atlantic region (which Group W wound up launching as Home Team Sports in the spring of 1984). However, in October, Group W dropped its sports network plans, which had already delayed the channel from fall 1983 to a spring 1984 debut.

=== Becoming Sportsvue ===
The cable channel changed its name to Sportsvue in January 1984; at the same time, it announced a launch date of April 3. The network would carry the season opener between the Brewers and the Oakland Athletics—part of a slate of 67 baseball contests—as well as a Bucks game two days later; in addition, the network trumpeted that it lined up 40 Wisconsin Badgers hockey and basketball games (football telecasts were not an immediate possibility due to a then-pending Supreme Court case and the team being on probation for the 1984 season), 10 Marquette University athletic events (primarily basketball), and National Hockey League coverage. (No final deal had been worked out with the University of Wisconsin by July, and negotiations continued into September.)

Sportsvue was a financial venture of importance to both the Brewers and Bucks, who were strapped for cash and played in a small market; the clubs hoped that Sportsvue revenues would help the teams remain competitive. Jim Fitzgerald, who owned the Bucks, warned in January 1984 that, if the channel were not successful, there was a chance he could sell the franchise.

=== Distribution and subscriber problems ===
Cable distribution was sometimes hit-or-miss around the state, and by far unconsolidated, unlike the current-day situation where Spectrum has a near-monopoly in Wisconsin. For those who subscribed to participating cable systems around the state, the service cost $8 to $9 a month. Some systems, such as Group W Cable in La Crosse (which ultimately changed its mind) and Teltron in Wausau and Stevens Point, did not add Sportsvue typically because the costs were too expensive or their systems required technical rebuilding to have the channel capacity needed to add the new service; Teltron had capacity for just two premium channels, space already taken up by HBO and Cinemax. Customers of the cable system in Madison needed new converter boxes to be able to subscribe. Other systems that would have been crucial to the company's success, such as RVS in Waukesha County and the system in Racine, did not pick up Sportsvue because they objected to its revenue split. One critical distribution shortfall did not even have to do with a specific cable system. The city of Milwaukee was not wired for cable at the time, prompting Sportsvue to consider alternate distribution methods, including the TVQ pay microwave system and SelecTV (itself struggling as part of a primetime/late night split on WCGV-TV), to reach customers there; Milwaukee was not projected to be cabled until 1986.

The network expected 50,000 subscribers after a year of operation, and it signed up 15,000 in its first month, but from there, subscription figures flatlined. As time went on, low uptake rates prompted additional cable providers that had been considering carriage of Sportsvue to hold off, like Warner Amex in Neenah. In other areas, such as Eau Claire (served by Wisconsin CATV and with split allegiances with the closer rival Minnesota Twins) interest was lower than the cable company needed to see to make money on the necessary investment; a Wisconsin CATV official warned that due to the number of subscribers Sportsvue needed to break even, "we don't know if that channel is going to make it". Officials attributed Sportsvue's stagnating uptake to the poor performance of the Brewers. The stagnation continued into December, when the service still had just 16,000 subscribers.

=== Closure ===
A month into 1985, the bottom fell out for Sportsvue. Its president, Joe O'Neill, stepped down from the position on January 15 but remained on as legal counsel, while the network announced on January 24 that it would axe a third of its staff. Four days later, further measures were announced in a bid to shore up the network's finances; the network would cut in half the number of live events it broadcast and raise its rates to cable companies. Not even these increasingly drastic changes were enough. On February 2, Sportsvue announced that it would cease operations after that night's Bucks game against the Portland Trail Blazers, citing the low subscriber count. The channel had lost $2 million in its 10 months of operation; Bucks owner Fitzgerald said the team had "taken a bath" on its investment in cable sports.

In appraising the reasons for its closure, Phil Rosenthal of The Capital Times cited the Brewers' poor performance in 1984; the inability to reach potential subscribers in uncabled Milwaukee; poor supplemental programming and its part-time operation; and the failure of the Group W venture.

=== Impact of closure ===
In the wake of the closure of Sportsvue, Bucks management said that the team would have to take a "hard look at the future" and Fitzgerald noted that other cities were already showing interest in buying the franchise. He then officially announced that he was putting the Bucks up for sale on February 5, just three days after the network folded. Grocery store magnate Herb Kohl bought the Bucks a month later, keeping them in Milwaukee. In a lawsuit later in the year over the 1979 privatization of the club, Fitzgerald claimed that he had not thought of selling the club until Sportsvue failed.

Brewers owner Bud Selig blamed larger-market teams and the 'territory invasion' hastened by superstations for the failure of Sportsvue. Specifically, WGN-TV and its Chicago Cubs coverage was seen throughout Wisconsin on a much more consistent basis as United Video uplinked that Chicago station to providers across the state. The Cubs' success in the 1984 season only hampered matters further.

A more immediate change was that the local stations that carried Brewers and Bucks games, and which had seen their inventories drop with Sportsvue, gained the opportunity to telecast additional games. WLRE in the Green Bay market added 16 more Brewers games that were offered by the club after the network's closure, along with six additional Bucks games in the remainder of the NBA season.

Group W again would attempt to launch a sports network in the state in 1996 with the Wisconsin Sports Network, a joint venture with Warner Cable, which had a reduced schedule of 35 Brewers games and was offered as a basic cable offering. The part-time network launched just as Westinghouse was merging with the CBS Corporation; in 1997, Wisconsin Sports Network was folded into the Midwest Sports Channel, which was co-owned with WCCO-TV in Minneapolis. A Wisconsin feed of MSC launched on April 1, 1998; this service continues to operate today as FanDuel Sports Wisconsin.
