= Total TV =

Total TV may refer to:

- TotalTV (Canadian TV provider), a Canadian television service
- TotalTV, a Serbian television service
- Total TV, Inc., a defunct American regional cable television company started by Jim Fitzgerald in 1964 and discontinued in 1998
- TV total, a German TV show
- Total TV (India), an Indian news channel
- Total Television, an American television production company
