= Jim Fitzgerald (businessman) =

American entrepreneur and businessman

- Born: James Francis Fitzgerald; March 27, 1926; Janesville, Wisconsin, U.S.
- Died: June 4, 2012 (aged 86); Janesville, Wisconsin, U.S.
- Education: Baldwin-Wallace College
- Alma mater: Notre Dame, University of Wisconsin-Whitewater (Ph.D.)
- Occupation: Businessman
- Years active: 1948–2000
- Employer: NBA
- Known for: Owner: Milwaukee Bucks, Golden State Warriors
- Spouse: Marilyn Cullen (m. 1950)
- Children: 6

James Francis Fitzgerald (March 27, 1926 – June 4, 2012) was an American businessman and former professional sports owner, best known as a former owner of the Milwaukee Bucks and the Golden State Warriors, both NBA teams.

== Early life ==
Fitzgerald graduated from high school and attended Baldwin-Wallace College in Berea, Ohio and Notre Dame in the V-12 Navy College Training Program, where he earned a bachelor's degree in naval science in 1947. He also held honorary Ph.D.s from the University of Wisconsin–Whitewater and Baldwin-Wallace College. He married Marilyn Cullen of Janesville on August 1, 1950, at Notre Dame's Old College Chapel. In 1952, he was called up for service in the Korean War as Navy paymaster on the USS Siboney, stationed in Norfolk, Virginia.

== Business career ==
After graduating cum laude, from Notre Dame he briefly joined Standard Oil. In 1948 he began his business career with a partner, Fred Weber. They became the Shell Oil jobbers for Janesville, Wisconsin, opening their first gas station on North Parker Drive. The business grew quickly, adding gas stations and car washes. In the late 1950s, Fitzgerald began building shopping centers with his brother-in-law, J. P. Cullen. In the early 1960s, he built the first Holiday Inn in Janesville with other investors, including Cullen and the Ryan brothers, both owners of construction firms, and expanded to six other cities.

The Fitzgerald group later bought into banks and cable television franchises in Janesville (Total TV, Inc.) and Madison, Wisconsin. The cable operations were eventually sold to Jones Intercable (now part of Comcast) and TCI. In the early 1980s, Total TV expanded throughout Wisconsin to include 40 cities.

In 1975, Fitzgerald led a group of investors that bought Milwaukee Professional Sports and Service, Inc., the parent company of the NBA Milwaukee Bucks. Fitzgerald became chairman of the NBA's television committee. He and Bud Selig founded the pay-per-view Sportsvue cable channel in Milwaukee, which carried Bucks and Brewers games throughout Wisconsin. The network's failure after 10 months of operation was a major contributing factor in Fitzgerald's sale of the franchise.

In the late 1990s, Fitzgerald was involved with SoftSpikes, a soft plastic replacement cleat for golf shoes. SoftSpikes was founded by Rob O'Loughlin, Fitzgerald's son-in-law. Fitzgerald was involved in several startup ventures, including LaserLink Golf, another O'Loughlin startup, and the manufacturer of a laser distance measuring device for golfers, run by O'Loughlin.

== Sports involvement ==
Fitzgerald was chairman of the Bucks until 1985, when the team was sold to Herb Kohl. In 1986, Fitzgerald and Dan Finnane, who had also been involved with the Bucks, took over the Golden State Warriors, which they owned through 1995 when they sold to Chris Cohan. At the time he owned each of these teams, Fitzgerald had only a "handshake agreement" with Don Nelson, head coach of both teams in turn, not a contract, an arrangement which reflected the friendship and trust between them. In an era of lawsuits and countersuits, this "contract" was unique in professional sports. In 1997, 50 years after Fitzgerald graduated from Notre Dame, the Fitzgerald family donated funds to build a new sports and communications center and press box at Notre Dame Stadium.

== Honors ==
During the 1990s, he received several awards including being inducted to the Janesville Sports Hall of Fame, the Wisconsin Athletic Hall of Fame, and the Wisconsin Business Hall of Fame.

== Personal life ==
Fitzgerald and his wife, Marilyn, had six children. He died on June 4, 2012, aged 86, at his home in Janesville. Marilyn died on December 17, 2019.

Sporting positions
Preceded by Franklin Mieuli	Golden State Warriors principal owner 1986–1995	Succeeded by Chris Cohan
Preceded by Wesley Pavalon; Marvin Fishman	Milwaukee Bucks principal owner 1976–1985	Succeeded by Herb Kohl
