= Telly Hughes =

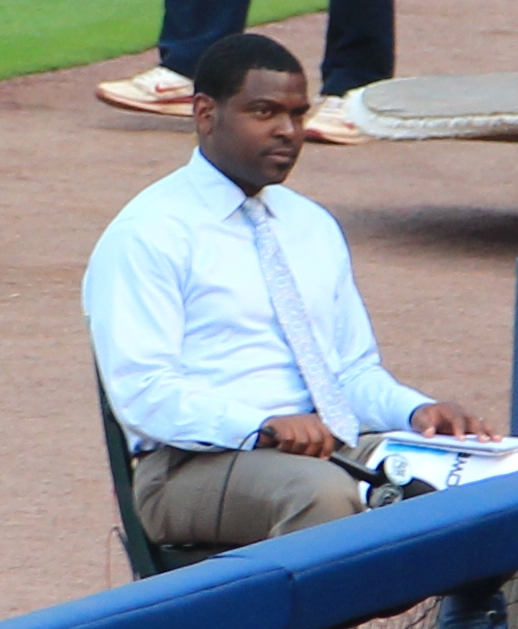
Telly Hughes in 2014

Telly Hughes is an American television sports personality and Big Ten Network host.

== Personal life ==
A native of Cahokia, Illinois, Hughes lives in Milwaukee with his family and is a graduate of Illinois State University where he pitched for the baseball team.

== Career ==
He worked as a weekend sports anchor at WMAZ-TV in Macon, Georgia. Later on, he worked for WHO and KPLR before transferring to Fox Sports North covering the Minnesota Twins, Timberwolves, and Wild for one year.

He previously worked for Fox Sports Wisconsin as a sideline reporter and host for Milwaukee Brewers and Bucks telecasts. In 2009, he joined the network after spending a few years in the Twin Cities working for Fox Sports North. Hughes currently provides studio coverage for the Big Ten Network.
