= Matt Lepay =

American sportscaster (born 1962)

Lepay in 2024

Matt Lepay (born March 9, 1962) is an American sportscaster. Since 1988, Lepay has been the radio voice for the Wisconsin Badgers men's basketball team, and since 1994, the voice of the Wisconsin Badgers football team.

== Early life ==
Lepay is a native of Vandalia, Ohio and graduated from Ohio State University.

== Career ==
=== Radio ===
Lepay came to Madison, Wisconsin in 1988 and began calling games for the Wisconsin Badgers men's basketball team that same year. In 1994, following a brief period as sports director for WTSO Radio in Madison, he began working for WIBA handling Wisconsin Badgers football broadcasts as well. Lepay is currently employed by the university through their rights deal with the national college sports broadcasting outfit Learfield Sports.

=== Television ===
Lepay also hosts the weekly Badger Sports Report, an all-sport Badger athletics/coach's show which airs on FanDuel Sports Network Wisconsin and statewide on local stations, including WISC-TV.

=== Milwaukee Brewers ===
In January 2014, it was announced that Lepay would handle play-by-play for the Milwaukee Brewers television broadcasts on Fox Sports Wisconsin, as a substitute for Brian Anderson, while Anderson handled national assignments for Turner Sports, including NBA playoff coverage for TNT and baseball coverage for TBS. Lepay continued to fill in for Anderson in each subsequent season until 2022, when he returned to focusing exclusively on the Badgers. On June 14, 2024, Lepay called the 6th inning of the Brewers' 6-5 loss to the Cincinnati Reds as part of a 30th anniversary celebration for Brewers color analyst Bill Schroeder.

== Awards and honors ==
Lepay is a seven-time winner of the Wisconsin Sportscaster of the Year Award.

In May 2012, Lepay was honored by The Madison Hall of Fame Club.

On June 21, 2024, Lepay was inducted into the Wisconsin Broadcasters Hall of Fame.

== Personal ==
Lepay lives in Cross Plains, Wisconsin with his wife Linda.
