= Total TV (American TV provider) =

American cable television company

- Industry: Entertainment
- Genre: Cable television
- Founded: 1964
- Founder: Jim Fitzgerald
- Defunct: 1998
- Fate: Discontinued

Total TV Inc. was a regional cable television company started by Jim Fitzgerald in 1964. Fitzgerald, J.P. Cullen, the Ryan brothers and several other investors began the company because of the poor quality television signals in their hometown of Janesville, Wisconsin. Fitzgerald would later purchase the Milwaukee Bucks in 1976 and the Golden State Warriors in 1987 with many of these same investors.

Total TV would eventually own cable systems in Wisconsin, Illinois and Florida.

Total TV began selling cable service in Janesville in 1965 at a time when few people had ever heard of cable television. Initial service included 12 black and white channels for $5/month. The company soon began to expand throughout southern Wisconsin. Total TV also purchased some cable television systems in northern Florida. In the early 1970s Total TV needed money to expand their operations. The Milwaukee Bucks had recently won the NBA championship and had money to invest. Fitzgerald soon struck a deal with the Bucks and joined their board of directors.

By the early 1980s, Total TV had expanded into 40 cities, all in Wisconsin. The expansion was taking an enormous amount of time, effort and capital. By this time, the original investors had purchased the Milwaukee Bucks. In 1984, most of Total TV's assets were sold to Denver-based Jones Intercable. Several systems and a few unbuilt cities were sold to two of Fitzgerald's sons who continued to use the Total TV name until 1998.

== See also ==
- List of cable television companies
