= Jim Powell (sportscaster) =

American sportscaster

Jim Powell is an American radio and television sportscaster, previously employed with Major League Baseball's Milwaukee Brewers (1996–2008) and Atlanta Braves (2009–2023).

A native of Roswell, Georgia, Powell was educated at the University of Georgia. He began his baseball play-by-play career with the minor-league Columbia Mets (1987–89, 1993–94) and Charlotte Knights (1990–91, 1995), also calling games part-time for the Minnesota Twins in 1993–94 before being hired by the Brewers in 1996. Teaming with Bob Uecker, Powell called games for the Milwaukee Brewers Radio Network and was named Wisconsin Sportscaster of the Year in 1998. In 2009, he began teaming with Don Sutton to call games on the Atlanta Braves Radio Network. Following Sutton's death prior to the 2021 season, the Braves named Ben Ingram and Joe Simpson as the primary radio team, with Powell continuing to call games on a part-time basis.

In addition to his baseball work, Powell has called college football (for the University of Georgia, University of South Carolina, and CBS Radio) and college basketball (for Davidson College and South Carolina) at various points in his career. He was inducted into the Georgia Association of Broadcasters Hall of Fame in 2020. Powell announced he would not be returning to the Braves' radio booth in 2024.
