= Wisconsin Sports Network =

Wisconsin Sports Network is a school and college sports website in the U.S. state of Wisconsin.

== History ==
The website was created in 2002 by Nicholas Kartos, who was later joined by Rick Hamilton. Wishoops.net launched on November 18, 2002 as a resource for high school basketball information in the state of Wisconsin. Originally the network focused mostly on basketball, mainly gearing towards boys prep basketball. There was a subscription service called Courtside, that offered player ranking and analysis into teams and conferences. The launch also featured a message board. The initial message board was limited in features. It offered forums for basketball and football, and dedicated forums for each conference in the WIAA. The following year WisFootball.net, a high school football site, and WisSports.net, a general sports message board, were added. It later added coverage for boys and girls hockey, boys and girls track and field, baseball, softball, wrestling, and boys and girls swimming. Beginning in 2008, WSN published the official boys track and field honor roll for the Wisconsin Track Coaches Association.

In 2007 TDS Telecom purchased a majority ownership of WSN. In February 2012, TDS sold the company to TST Media, (now SportEngine) a company that produces the NGIN website platform, used by WisSports.net and more than 3,000 leagues and sports organizations in the U.S.

== Content ==
The Wisconsin Basketball Yearbook is a resource for high school and college basketball in Wisconsin. Features include senior profiles and team previews of high school and college teams in the state

Fox Sports Net North Wisconsin, Wishoops, Prepfilms.com and When We Were Young Productions jointly broadcast a prep basketball game each week.

Wisfootball is Wishoops's football counterpart. Starting with the 2006 prep football season, it offered a subscription service called "Sideline". The subscription service ended in 2008 when all content became freely viewable. Much like Wishoops, Wisfootball offers player rankings, scouting reports, and team rankings and feature articles.

The Wisconsin Gridiron Guide contains information about football in Wisconsin. Features include profiles for every team, including schedule, returning players and other team info, conference previews, individual school player profiles, state tournament recaps, stat leaders and all-time records, and Division 1, 2 & 3 college previews for state teams. The Gridiron Guide was not published in 2008, as its content was moved to the website and WSN Illustrated.

In January 2007 WSN hired Laura Ritchie and began publishing her magazine Wisconsin Preps Illustrated, renaming it WSN Illustrated. WSNi promotes student-athletes in Wisconsin, with articles featuring athletes and coaches accompanied by action photos. WSN Illustrated is published four times during the school year and is distributed free to all high schools in the state.

== Wisconsin Sports Minute ==
The Wisconsin Sports Minute is a radio program that airs seven days a week on approximately 20 stations throughout Wisconsin.

The program takes a 'This Day In History' look at notable sports moments from the Badger State.

In conjunction with the radio program is a Twitter page, @jackeichsays, that offers more and different looks at Wisconsin and Florida sports history.

Jack Eich is the voice of the Wisconsin Sports Minute. The award-winning sportscaster formerly was a television sports director in Madison and a radio play-by-play broadcaster in Madison. He currently lives in the Tampa, Florida area and is the voice of University of Tampa Spartans baseball, men's/women's basketball and men's /women's soccer. UT is one of the most successful D2 athletic programs in the United States.
