= Jones Intercable =

American cable television company

- Industry: Cable television
- Founded: 1970
- Defunct: 1999
- Fate: Acquired by Comcast
- Successor: Comcast
- Headquarters: Georgetown, Colorado, US
- Key people: Glenn Jones

Jones Intercable was a cable television company founded by Glenn R. Jones in 1970. Jones, already a cable television veteran, had bought his first cable system in Georgetown, Colorado after taking a $400 loan on his Volkswagen. The company expanded rapidly and by 1994 it had 1.4 million subscribers. In 1995, the company was 30 percent owned by Bell Canada International.

In 1999, Comcast took full control of Jones Intercable, acquiring 100 percent of the company in a deal valued around $3 billion.

== History ==
=== 1970–1990 ===
The company was founded in cable television by Glenn R. Jones in 1970. Jones, already a cable television veteran, had bought his first cable system in Georgetown, Colorado after taking a $400 loan on his Volkswagen. In 1986, the ownership of Jones Intercable of Tampa, which had formerly been Tampa Cable, was transferred to a company called Cable TV Fund 12-BCD Venture. In 1988, Jones Intercable purchased Broward Cablevision for $95 million, which was providing service in Broward County, Florida. In 1989, the cable television operations TCI East and Adelphia Cable Communications were trying to buy Jones Intercable's business in New York. Jones Intercable was being sold because "the limited partnership that has owned it for more than five years is dissolving so investors may cash out."

=== 1991–1997 ===
The company served "40,000 customers in nine communities, most of them in western Du Page County" in early 1992. In 1993, 30% of the company was purchased by BCI Telecom Holdings, which maintained partial ownership of the cable firm until May 1998, when Comcast announced it would be buying BCI's 37% portion of the cable giant. The company expanded rapidly and by 1994 it had 1.4 million subscribers. It was also broadcasting in Antelope Valley, California in 1993 and in Georgia in 1995, when it had around 77,500 or so subscribers overall, with 55 cable systems and 1.5 million "basic" subscribers. In 1995, the company was 30 percent owned by Bell Canada International.

Jones Intercable in September in 1995 launched a $35 million cable television system in Alexandria. The Baltimore Sun called it an "important milestone" as seen by video industry experts, as the new design had a "self-healing" function to eliminate cable outages, also expanding from 53 analog channels to 87. Between 1994 and 1996, Jones spent $40 million on equipment in Alexandria, and in 1996 was giving cable service to 39,000 out of 62,000 households and businesses in the city. Around two dozen residents in Alexandria were used to test a new service, described as "ultra-high-speed access to the Internet through cable TV wires" by The Washington Post, in 1995 and 1996, expanding on the company's already existent cable TV franchise in Alexandria. The system removed the need to dial out, as the service was always on.

=== 1998–1999 ===
A deal in May 1998 to purchase some stock gave Comcast "rights to acquire control of Jones Intercable's 1.4 million subscribers and prevents anyone else from getting them." The Comcast deal left Comcast with a 37 percent economic stake and a 47 percent voting stake.

Around September 1999, Comcast announced that it had started to buy up the company's stock. Comcast purchased almost a million Class-A shares of Jones Intercable from Jones International along with almost 3,000 from Glenn Jones himself. This led to Comcast taking full control of Jones Intercable, with Comcast acquiring 100 percent of the company in a deal valued at around $3 billion.

== See also ==
- List of cable companies
- List of companies with Denver area operations
- Total TV (American TV provider)
- History of virtual learning environments
- WERV-FM
