= Jim Irwin (sportscaster) =

American football announcer

- Born: James R. Irwin; February 7, 1934; Linn Creek, Missouri, U.S.
- Died: January 22, 2012 (aged 77); Orange County, California
- Education: University of Missouri
- Occupation: Sportscaster
- Years active: 1969–1998

James R. Irwin (February 7, 1934 – January 22, 2012) was an American sportscaster at WTMJ Radio in Milwaukee, Wisconsin. He is best known for being the radio voice of the Green Bay Packers for 30 years.

== Career ==
Irwin worked with former Packer Lionel Aldridge, and was paired for 20 seasons with Super Bowl I hero Max McGee. Irwin also called Milwaukee Brewers baseball, Milwaukee Bucks basketball, and Wisconsin Badgers football and basketball games. He joined the Packers radio broadcasts as a color commentator in 1969 and assumed play by play duties in 1975, a position he held until his retirement after the 1998 season, along with morning sportscasting and commentary duties on WTMJ's morning program. He was inducted into the Packers Hall of Fame in 2003. Irwin continued to contribute occasionally to WTMJ after he retired.

Prior to his longtime career as the voice of the Packers, Irwin began his broadcast career in 1964 as sports director at WLUK-TV in Green Bay.

== Early life and death ==
He was born in Linn Creek, Missouri. Irwin served in the U.S. Army in Korea and then enrolled at the University of Missouri, where he majored in speech.

Irwin died of complications from kidney cancer on January 22, 2012, at the age of 77.
