= Wisconsin Sports Network (TV channel) =

Defunct regional sports network in Wisconsin

- Type: Regional sports network
- Country: United States
- Broadcast area: Wisconsin
- Headquarters: Milwaukee, Wisconsin

Programming
- Language(s): English

Ownership
- Owner: Group W

History
- Launched: 1996
- Closed: 1997
- Replaced by: Midwest Sports Channel/Fox Sports Wisconsin/Bally Sports Wisconsin; Time Warner Cable SportsChannel/Spectrum Sports Wisconsin

Wisconsin Sports Network was a regional sports network that served the state of Wisconsin. The network was created in 1996 when Westinghouse Broadcasting (Group W) gained broadcast rights to both the Milwaukee Bucks and Milwaukee Brewers.

== History ==
The Bucks games were first broadcast in January 1996 under the name Bucks Network, but the name was changed to Wisconsin Sports Network a few months later once the broadcast rights to the Brewers were obtained. 25 Brewers games were carried during the 1996 season. When not broadcasting live games, the schedule was filled with programming from NewSport. In 1997, Midwest Sports Channel (owned by CBS, which had just purchased Westinghouse) assumed responsibility for producing and distributing games on the network. The network briefly became known as the Wisconsin Sports Channel before being folded into Midwest Sports Channel at the end of the year.
