= Franklin Mieuli =

American producer and sports owner (1920–2010)

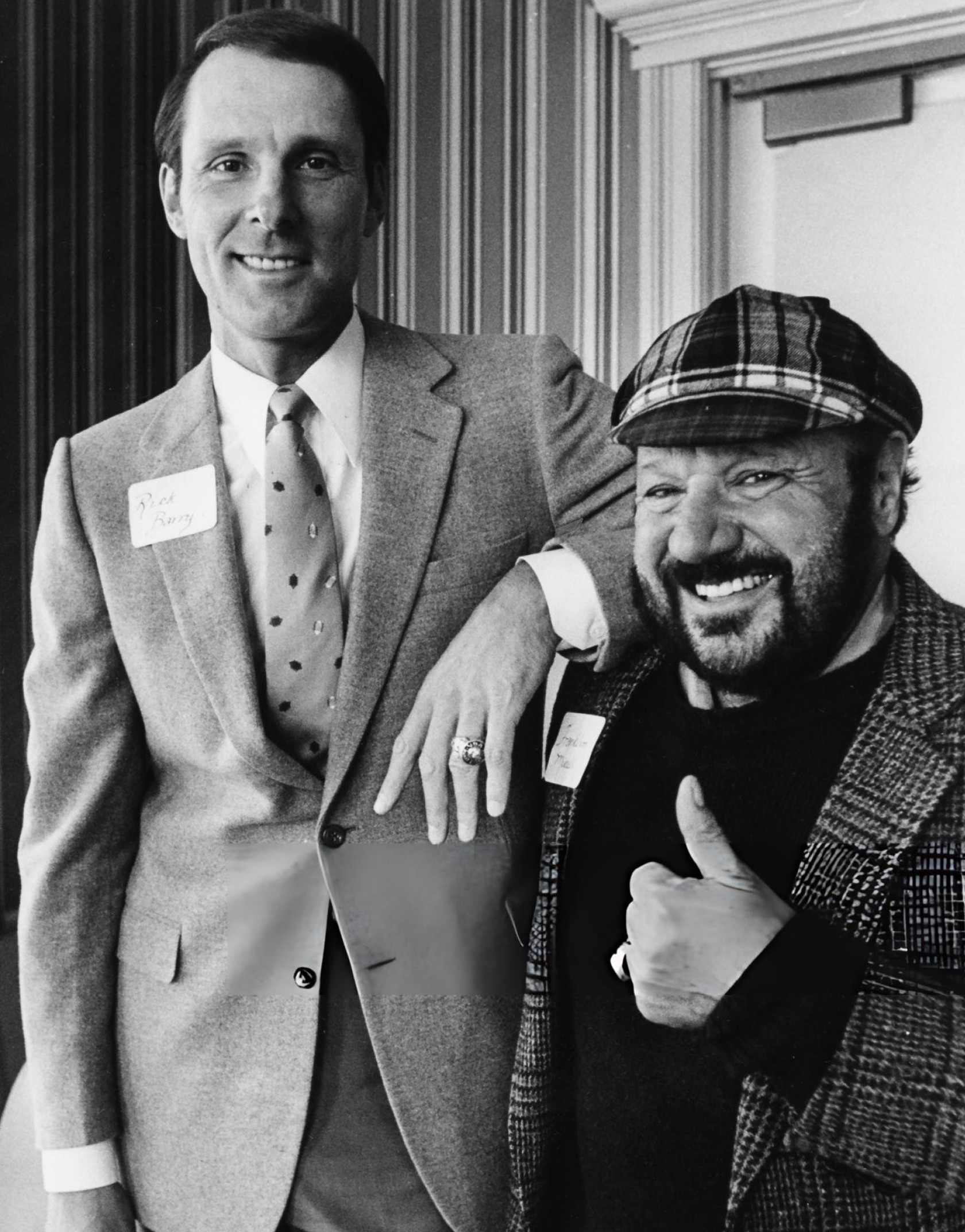
- Mieuli (right) with Rick Barry in 1987
- Born: September 14, 1920; San Jose, California, U.S.
- Died: April 25, 2010 (aged 89); Oakland, California, U.S.
- Education: University of Oregon
- Occupations: Former owner of Golden State Warriors, minority co-owner of the San Francisco 49ers and the San Francisco Giants
- Parents: Giacomo Mieuli (father); Antonia Maria Struggibinetti (mother)

Franklin Mieuli (/ˈmjuːli/ MEW-lee; September 14, 1920 – April 25, 2010) was a San Francisco Bay Area radio and television producer who was best known as the principal owner of the San Francisco / Golden State Warriors from 1962 to 1986. The pinnacle of his 24 years with the franchise was its National Basketball Association (NBA) Championship in 1975. He was also a minority shareholder in both the San Francisco 49ers and Giants.

An eccentric personality, Mieuli eschewed formal attire and conservative grooming in favor of a casual wardrobe and his ever-present full beard and deerstalker. His preferred mode of transportation was the motorcycle.

Mieuli died in Oakland, California at age 89 due to natural causes.

== Early years ==
Mieuli, the second son of Italian immigrants from Castellana Grotte, Apulia, was born in San Jose, California on September 14, 1920. His father Giacomo and older brother Jack Jr. owned and operated Navlet's Nursery in the East Bay (San Francisco Bay Area).

Mieuli graduated from San Jose High School in 1940 and the University of Oregon with a bachelor's degree in 1945.

In the early 1950s, Mieuli was the local promotions man for Burgermeister Beer ("Burgie"). His association with the 49ers led him to land the team's star fullback, Joe "The Jet" Perry, on his own sports and music radio program, "Both Sides Of The Record", sponsored by Burgie, on R&B-formatted KWBR (1310 AM; later known as KDIA) beginning in 1954.

Mieuli also produced the 49ers radio broadcasts on KSFO beginning in the 1950s, and produced the first televised 49ers game in 1954. He subsequently produced Giants radio broadcasts, hosted by Russ Hodges and Lon Simmons upon the team's move from New York by owner Horace Stoneham in 1958.

Mieuli was influential in the hiring of sportscaster Bill King, initially the third man in the Giants broadcast booth in 1958, behind Hodges and Simmons. Upon Mieuli's purchase of the Warriors in 1962, King left Giants radio to become play-by-play voice of the newly minted "San Francisco Warriors". Coincidentally, at the time of Mieuli's purchase of the team, he was still producing the KSFO broadcasts of the Giants, 49ers, and the Warriors.

In 1956, Mieuli purchased five reel-to-reel audiotape duplicators from Ampex for use in distributing sports and music programming to radio stations. The venture led him to create Hi*Speed Duplicating Company, the first business of its kind in Northern California. In 1960, Mieuli produced national radio coverage of the VIII Winter Olympic Games at Squaw Valley. This was the start of his long-standing radio and television production company, Franklin Mieuli & Associates.

On January 8, 1958, Mieuli was granted a construction permit for a new FM radio station in San Francisco, which went on the air on Thursday, December 10, 1959, as KPUP (106.9 FM); the station is now the FM portion of all-news KCBS radio's simulcast. Reflecting Mieuli's love for the style of music, KPUP programmed a Jazz music format, drawing from the rich variety of artists and recordings that were popular at the time, as well as Mieuli's friendship with Saul Zaentz of Fantasy Records. (The San Francisco Giants' 1962 season highlights, narrated by Russ Hodges and Lon Simmons and produced by Mieuli, were released on a long-playing record by Fantasy, catalog number GB-1962.)

KPUP's call letters were changed to the jazzier-sounding KHIP in July 1960. To help finance his purchase of the Warriors, Mieuli sold KHIP to Leon Crosby in June 1962 for $146,000; Crosby renamed the station KMPX.

== Golden State Warriors ==
Mieuli, along with 32 other local investors, was part of a joint venture headed by Diners Club that purchased the Philadelphia Warriors from Eddie Gottlieb for $850,000 and moved the ballclub to the Bay Area following the 1961–62 NBA season. After drawing 5,579 per home game in the prior year, the Warriors fell to the bottom of the league in attendance average with 3,067 in 1962–63, its first season in San Francisco. When Diners Club and other stockholders threatened to bail out from the franchise, Mieuli simply purchased their shares until he eventually became the sole owner.

His 24-year ownership of the Warriors was moderately successful on the court, as the team made the playoffs ten times with three NBA Finals appearances. The first two trips to the championship series resulted in defeats to the Boston Celtics in 1964 and the Philadelphia 76ers in 1967. The third one in 1975 was a four-game sweep of the Washington Bullets and the first time the franchise won the title after its move to the Bay Area. Home attendance was a different story as the Warriors averaged more than 10,000 a game only five times (1976–1979, 1981).

Mieuli played a major role in breaking down racial barriers in the NBA by encouraging his team's front office to sign players regardless of color. Ten of the twelve players on the Warriors' championship roster during the 1975 Finals were African American, as was head coach Al Attles and his assistant Joe Roberts.

Mieuli sold the Warriors to Jim Fitzgerald and Daniel Finnane on May 23, 1986.

== Later career ==
Until his death in 2010, Mieuli retained a 10% share of the 49ers, an investment that dates back to 1954. In addition to his role with Franklin Mieuli & Associates, which handles broadcast engineering for thirty pro and college sports teams, he was an active member of the San Francisco chapter of Broadcast Legends, and was inducted into the National Television Academy/Northern California Chapter's Gold Circle in 2006, honoring him for his significant contributions to local television during a career spanning more than fifty years.

In 2007, Mieuli was inducted into the Bay Area Radio Hall of Fame as a member of the second class to be honored. He was the recipient of five Super Bowl rings as a part-owner of the 49ers, as well as one NBA Championship trophy as the owner of the Warriors. He died at a hospital in the San Francisco Bay Area in 2010.

His firm, Franklin Mieuli & Associates, continues to produce radio broadcasts for many professional teams in the NFL, NBA, NHL, and MLB; as well as NCAA teams.

Sporting positions
Preceded by Eddie Gottlieb as Philadelphia Warriors	San Francisco/Golden State Warriors owner 1962–1985	Succeeded by Jim Fitzgerald
