= Robert Rowell (basketball) =

National Basketball Association executive

- Born: Robert Rowell; 1967 (age 58–59)
- Education: Cal Poly San Luis Obispo
- Known for: Former president of the Golden State Warriors

Robert Rowell is an American sports executive who worked for the Golden State Warriors of the National Basketball Association (NBA) for 16 years. Rowell was team president from 2003 to 2011.

== Career ==
=== Early career ===
After completing his degree at Cal Poly San Luis Obispo, Robert Rowell worked for the university as business manager in the athletic department. In that role, he led an upgrade in the school's NCAA status from Division II to Division I-A.

In 1995, he was hired by the Golden State Warriors as assistant controller. He focused on marketing the team better, leading a re-branding campaign using the slogan: "It's a Great Time Out." He also improved the Warriors' website, increasing the number of visits and sales there, as well as installing an in-arena cybercafé and experimenting with live webcasts. Game attendance and season ticket sales increased.

Rowell's successful marketing efforts led to increased responsibilities in the organization's front office, becoming chief operating officer in 2001, at 34 years old. He represented the team at the NBA Board of Governors and received Sports Business Journal's Forty Under 40 Award the same year.

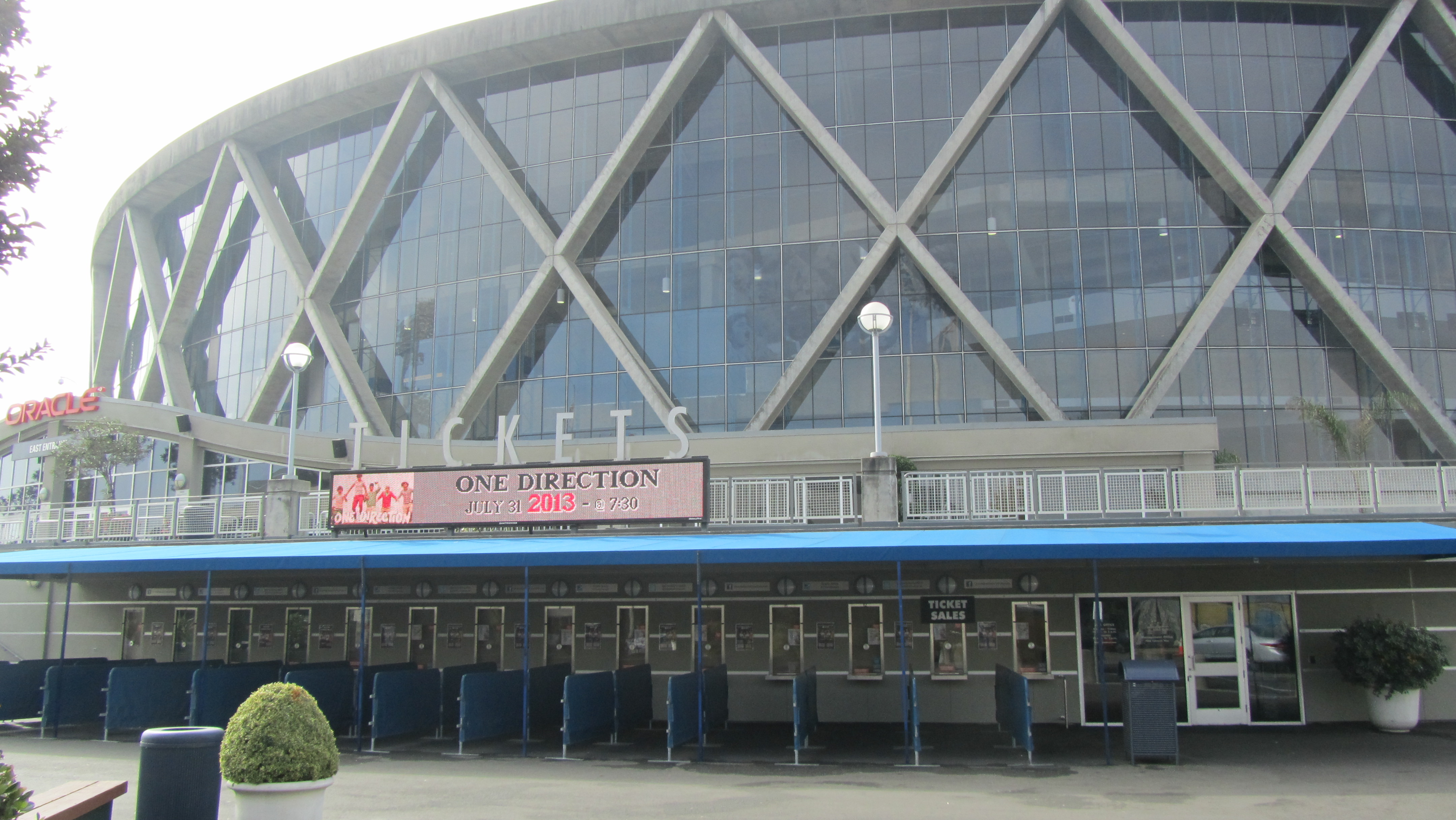
Oakland Arena, home of the Warriors during Rowell's tenure

=== Warriors president ===
In June 2003, Rowell was promoted to team president, reporting to Chris Cohan, owner of the team at that time. Rowell's tenure as president was marked with success from a business operations standpoint but mostly disappointment on the basketball side.

After a disappointing finish to the 2003-04 season, head coach Eric Musselman was fired, and stars Nick Van Exel and Erick Dampier were traded. Rowell made his first major hires, attempting to better the team's basketball prospects. He hired Chris Mullin as executive vice president of basketball operations, similar to a general manager role, and Mike Montgomery as head coach.

The team underperformed under Montgomery, remaining at 12th place in the western conference for both years. However, flashes of potential came from the drafting of Monta Ellis and a trade for Baron Davis. In September 2006, Don Nelson replaced Montgomery as head coach and the team returned to the playoffs and shocked many in the basketball world when they defeated the top seeded Dallas Mavericks.

The Warriors would not return to the playoffs under Rowell. Jason Richardson was traded in June 2007, Baron Davis left in free agency the following year. The decision to suspend Monta Ellis for 30 games for his moped accident created a rift between Rowell and Mullin in the team front office. This, as well as differences of opinion in player contract negotiations, led to Mullin's ouster in May 2009. Larry Riley became the new GM.

In July 2010, ownership of the team changed, with Cohan selling it to a group led by Joe Lacob and Peter Guber for a then-record price of $450 million. Rowell stayed for a year but was terminated as team president in 2011, as part of an organization-wide shake up under the new ownership group.

=== Post-Warriors work ===
After Rowell left the Warriors, he went on to work for The Wagstaffe Group, a legal publishing company, as a partner. He also serves as an advisor to EPIC Leisure Management.
