= Robert Rowell =

Robert Rowell may refer to:

- Robert Dale Rowell, American murderer
- Robert Rowell (basketball), American basketball executive
- Bob Rowell, English rugby union player
