= Golden State Warriors =

National Basketball Association team in San Francisco, California

- 2026–27 Golden State Warriors season
- Conference: Western
- Division: Pacific
- Founded: 1946
- History: Philadelphia Warriors; 1946–1962; San Francisco Warriors; 1962–1971; Golden State Warriors; 1971–present
- Arena: Chase Center
- Location: San Francisco, California
- Team colors: Royal blue, yellow, black
- Main sponsor: Rakuten
- President: Brandon Schneider
- General manager: Mike Dunleavy Jr.
- Head coach: Steve Kerr
- Ownership: Joe Lacob (majority); Peter Guber
- Affiliation: Santa Cruz Warriors
- Championships: 7 (1947, 1956, 1975, 2015, 2017, 2018, 2022)
- Conference titles: 7 (1975, 2015, 2016, 2017, 2018, 2019, 2022)
- Division titles: 12 (1948, 1951, 1956, 1964, 1967, 1975, 1976, 2015, 2016, 2017, 2018, 2019)
- Retired numbers: 7 (9, 13, 14, 16, 17, 24, 42)
- Website: nba.com/warriors
Association	Icon

The Golden State Warriors are an American professional basketball team based in San Francisco. The Warriors compete in the National Basketball Association (NBA) as a member of the Pacific Division of the Western Conference. Founded in 1946 in Philadelphia, the Warriors moved to the San Francisco Bay Area in 1962 and took the city's name before changing its geographic moniker to Golden State in 1971. (Note: California made "The Golden State" its official state nickname in 1968. "California State Symbols". California State Library. May 10, 2015. Archived from the original on January 25, 2016.) (Note: The Warriors changed their club geographic name from San Francisco to Golden State before the 1971–72 NBA season. "Warriors History Index". National Basketball Association. Golden State Warriors.) The team plays its home games at Chase Center.

The Warriors won the inaugural Basketball Association of America (BAA) championship in 1947, (Note: After three seasons the eastern BAA merged with the older, midwestern National Basketball League (NBL) to create the NBA before the 1949–50 season. The NBA recognizes BAA history as the first stage of its own and begins its list of champions with the 1947 Warriors. "NBA Season Recaps: 1946–47 to 2018–19". NBA.com. NBA Media Ventures, LLC.) and won again in 1956, led by Hall of Fame trio Paul Arizin, Tom Gola, and Neil Johnston. After the trade of star Wilt Chamberlain in January 1965, the team finished the 1964–65 season with the NBA's worst record (17–63). Their rebuilding period was brief, however, as they drafted Rick Barry four months after the trade. Barry, along with Jamaal Wilkes, powered the Warriors to their third championship in 1975, widely considered one of the biggest upsets in NBA history.

The team struggled in the 1980s, then became playoff regulars at the turn of the decade with stars Tim Hardaway, Mitch Richmond, and Chris Mullin, nicknamed "Run TMC". Led by Stephen Curry, Klay Thompson, and Draymond Green, the team returned to championship glory in 2015. In 2016, the Warriors achieved the best-ever regular-season record at 73–9 before losing the Finals to the Cleveland Cavaliers in seven games after surrendering a 3–1 series lead. After signing former MVP Kevin Durant, the team won back-to-back championships in 2017 and 2018. They lost the 2019 Finals to the Toronto Raptors and Durant left that off-season. After missing the playoffs the next two seasons, the Warriors returned to the playoffs and defeated the Boston Celtics in the 2022 Finals.

Nicknamed the "Dubs" as a shortening of "W's", the Warriors hold several NBA records: best regular season, most wins in a season (regular season and postseason combined), and best postseason run. Curry and Thompson are generally considered one of the greatest backcourts of all time. The Warriors rank third for the most NBA championships and Finals appearances in NBA history, trailing only the Boston Celtics and Los Angeles Lakers. Chamberlain and Curry are the only players in franchise history to win the league MVP award, for a total of three awards.

== History ==
=== 1946–1962: Early years in Philadelphia ===
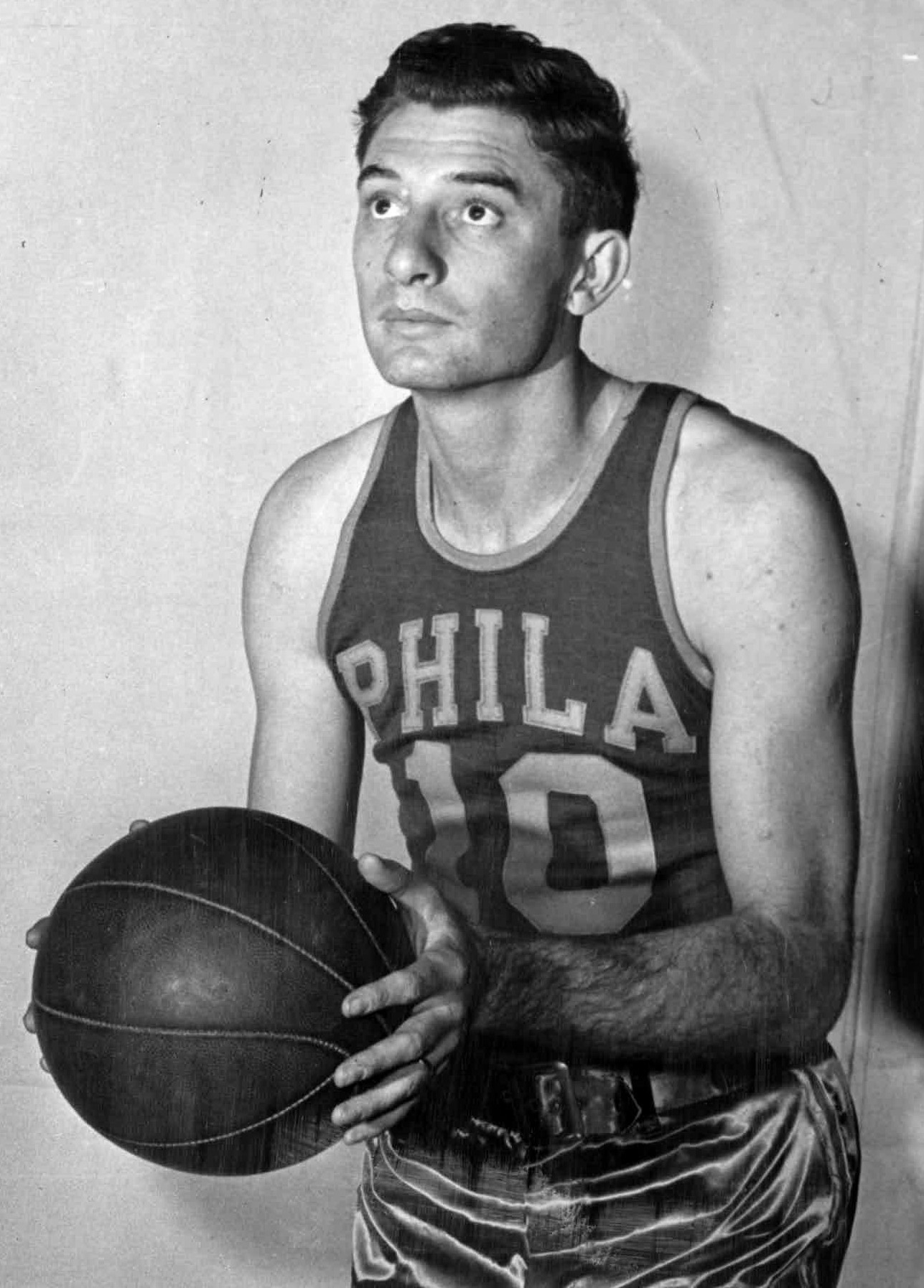
Joe Fulks was the league's first scoring champion.

The Warriors were founded in 1946 as the Philadelphia Warriors, a charter member of the Basketball Association of America. They were owned by Peter A. Tyrrell, who also owned the Philadelphia Rockets of the American Hockey League. Tyrrell hired Eddie Gottlieb, a longtime basketball promoter in the Philadelphia area, as head coach and general manager. The owners named the team after the Philadelphia Warriors, an old basketball team who played in the American Basketball League in 1925. However, the original Philadelphia Warriors team name would be named more in honor of the team that would be best known as the Philadelphia Sphas throughout most of their existence, with that team existing as a franchise up until 1959.

Led by early scoring sensation Joe Fulks, the team won the championship in the league's inaugural 1946–47 season by defeating the Chicago Stags, four games to one. The NBA, which was created by a 1949 merger, officially recognizes that as its own first championship. Gottlieb bought the team in 1951.

The Warriors won its next championship in Philadelphia in the 1955–56 season, defeating the Fort Wayne Pistons four games to one. The Warrior stars of this era were future Hall of Famers Paul Arizin, Tom Gola and Neil Johnston.

=== 1959–1965: The Wilt Chamberlain era ===
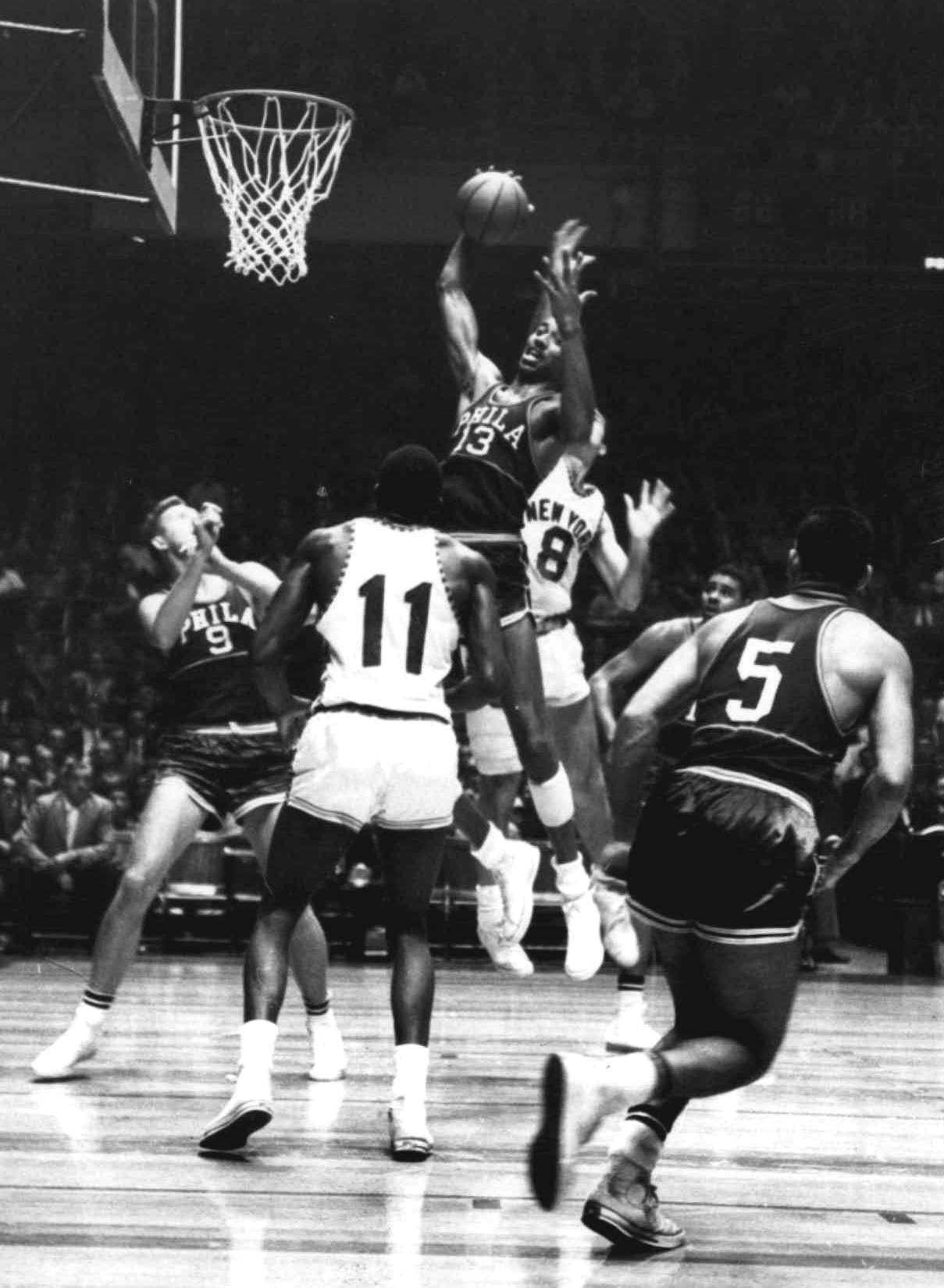
Wilt Chamberlain averaged 41.5 points per game and 25.1 rebounds per game during his five and a half seasons with the Warriors.

In 1959, the team signed draft pick Wilt Chamberlain. Known as "Wilt the Stilt", he led the team in scoring six times, quickly began shattering NBA scoring records and changed the NBA style of play forever. On March 2, 1962, in a Warrior "home" game played on a neutral court in Hershey, Pennsylvania, Chamberlain scored 100 points against the New York Knicks, a single-game record the NBA ranks among its finest moments.

In 1962, Franklin Mieuli purchased a majority of shares in the team, moved it to the San Francisco Bay Area, and renamed it the San Francisco Warriors. The Warriors played most of their home games at the Cow Palace in Daly City, just south of the San Francisco city limits, from 1962 to 1964; then the San Francisco Civic Auditorium from 1964 to 1966. Occasionally, home games were played in nearby cities such as Oakland and San Jose. They also played frequently at the University of San Francisco's War Memorial Gymnasium. Philadelphia would not remain without an NBA team for long; the Syracuse Nationals moved to the city in 1963 and became the Philadelphia 76ers.

Before the 1963–64 NBA season, the Warriors drafted big man Nate Thurmond to go along with Chamberlain. The Warriors won the Western Division crown that season, but lost the 1964 NBA Finals to the Boston Celtics, four games to one. In the 1964–65 season, the Warriors traded Chamberlain to the Philadelphia 76ers for Connie Dierking, Lee Shaffer, Paul Neumann and $150,000 and won only 17 games.

=== 1965–1978: The Thurmond and Barry era ===
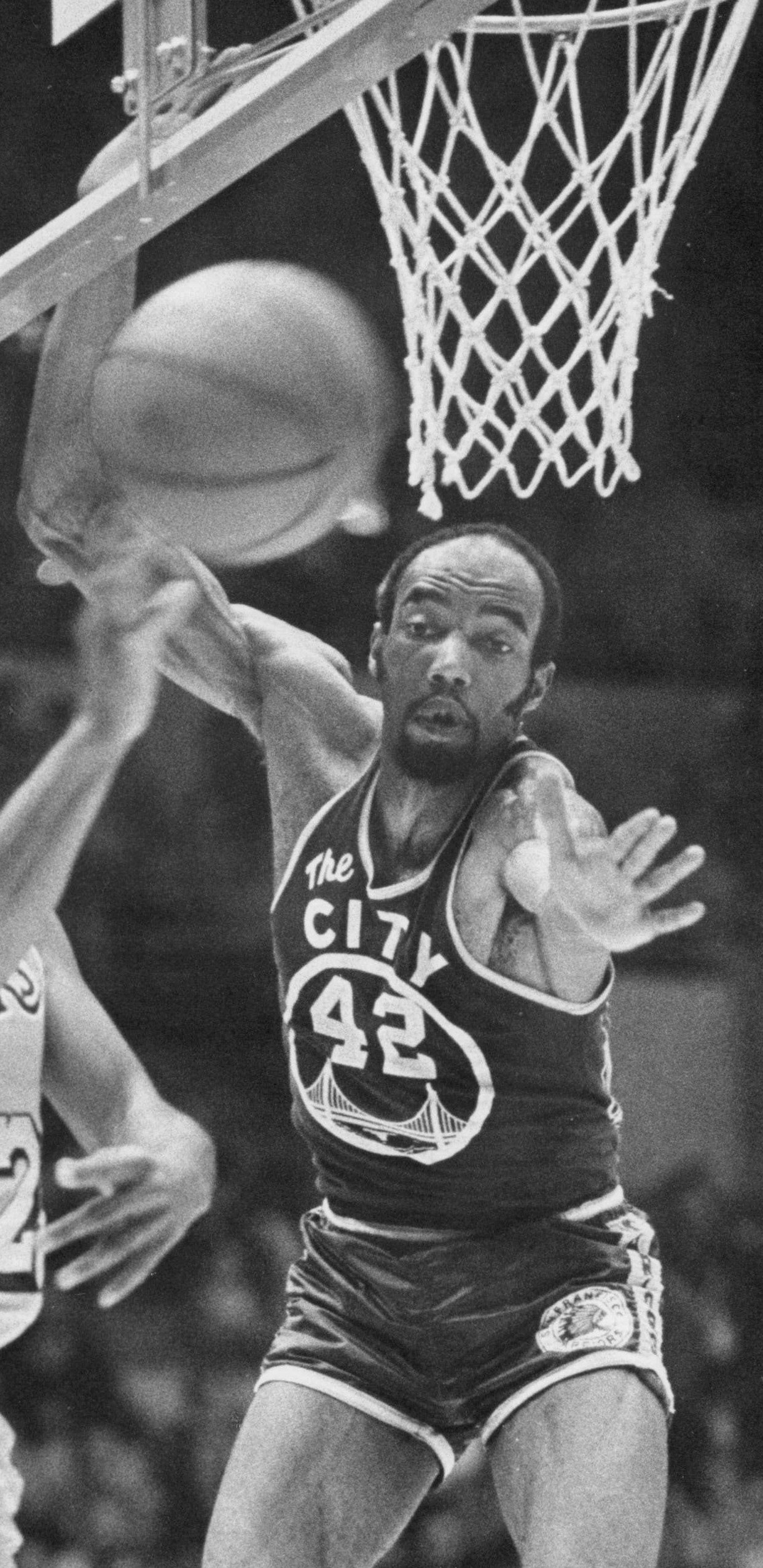
Nate Thurmond averaged over 20 points per game during five different seasons and over 20 rebounds per game during two seasons while with the Warriors.

In 1965, the team used their first-round draft pick on Rick Barry, who became NBA Rookie of the Year before leading the Warriors to the NBA Finals in the 1966–67 season. The Warriors lost the Finals, four games to two, to the 76ers: Chamberlain's new team that had replaced the Warriors in Philadelphia.

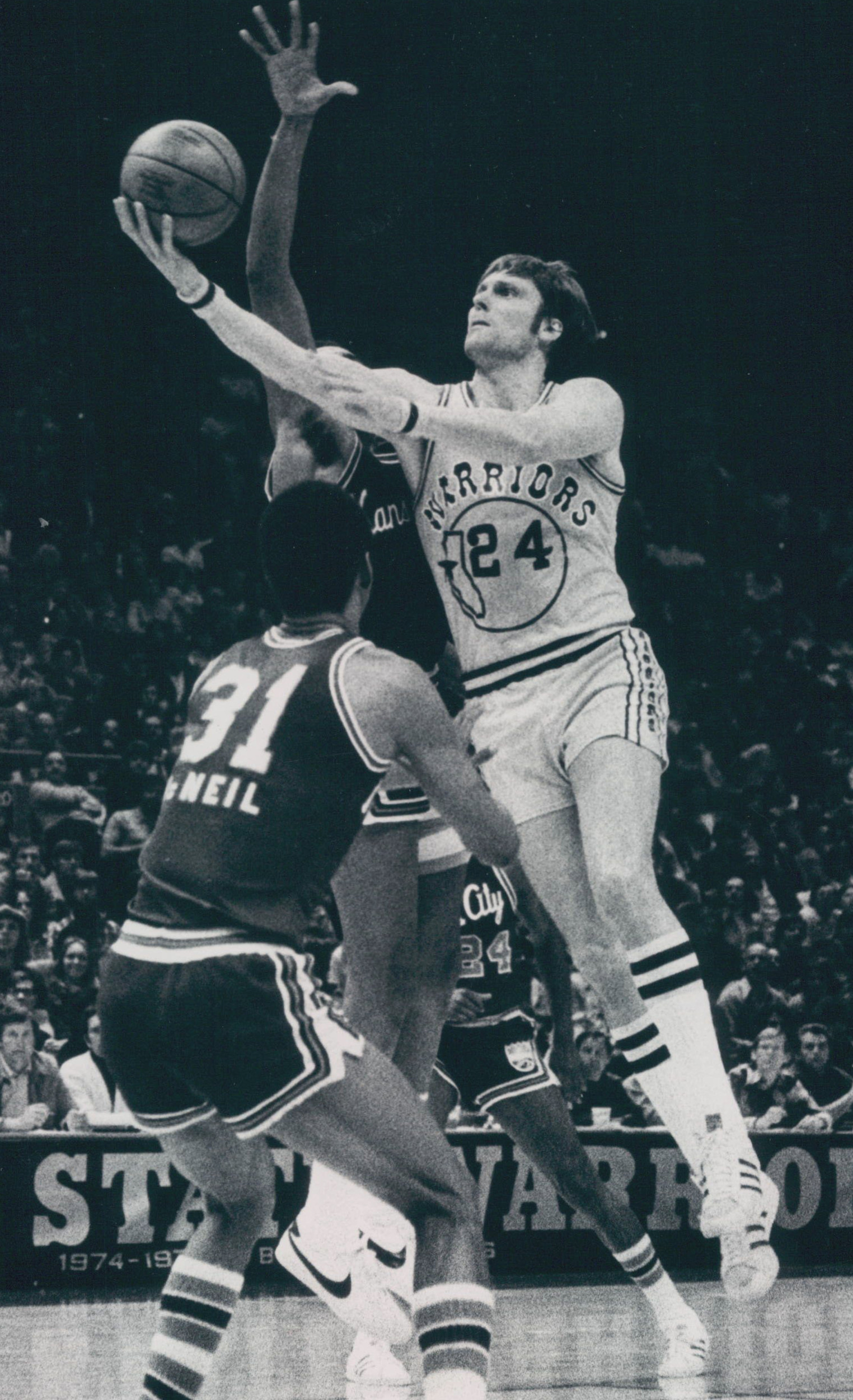
Rick Barry (shown in 1976) was named the NBA Finals MVP in 1975.

Angered by management's failure to pay him certain incentive bonuses he felt were due him, Barry sat out the 1967–68 season and signed with the Oakland Oaks of the rival American Basketball Association for the following year, but after four seasons in the ABA rejoined the Warriors in 1972. During Barry's absence, the Warriors were no longer title contenders, and the mantle of leadership fell to Thurmond, Jeff Mullins and Rudy LaRusso. They began scheduling more home games in Oakland with the opening of the Oakland Coliseum Arena in 1966 and the 1970–71 season was the team's last as the San Francisco Warriors.

The franchise adopted the name Golden State Warriors before the 1971–72 season, to suggest that the team represented the entire state of California. Almost all home games were played in Oakland that season; six were played in San Diego, but none in San Francisco or Daly City. Oakland Arena became the team's exclusive home court in 1971.

The Warriors made the playoffs from 1971 to 1977 except in 1974, and won their first NBA championship on the West Coast in 1974–75. In what many consider the biggest upset in NBA history, Golden State not only defeated the heavily favored Washington Bullets but humiliated them in a four-game sweep. That team was coached by former Warrior Al Attles, and led on the court by Rick Barry and Jamaal Wilkes. Barry was named Finals MVP.

At 59–23, the Warriors had the league's best record during the 1975–76 season. They were upset, however, by the 42–40 Phoenix Suns in seven games in the Western Conference Finals.

=== 1978–1985: Competitive struggles ===
Due to the loss of key players such as Barry, Wilkes and Thurmond to trades and retirements, the Warriors struggled to put a competitive team on the court from 1978 to 1987 after being one of the NBA's dominant teams in the 1960s and most of the 1970s. Through the NBA draft, however, they acquired some players such as high-scoring forward Purvis Short (1978), former Purdue center Joe Barry Carroll (1980) and center Robert Parish (1976), who was traded to the Boston Celtics in 1980 along with the draft pick that would become Kevin McHale for the pick used to draft Carroll. In 1983, the Warriors matched the New York Knicks' offer for free-agent Bernard King, but, unable to pay his high salary, quickly traded him to the Knicks for guard Micheal Ray Richardson, whom they soon shipped to New Jersey in exchange for former Georgetown Hoya point guard Eric "Sleepy" Floyd, and journeyman forward Mickey Johnson. Floyd once scored 29 points for the Warriors in the fourth quarter of a playoff game against the Lakers, though he was later traded to the Houston Rockets.

The departure of these players for various reasons symbolized the franchise's futility during this period, as head coach Attles moved up to the front office as general manager in 1980 and the team made several coaching changes. New owners Jim Fitzgerald and Dan Finane finally managed to return the team to respectability by hiring former Cleveland Cavaliers head coach George Karl as head coach in 1986 after selecting St. John's small forward Chris Mullin in the 1985 NBA draft.

=== 1985–1997: The "Run TMC" era ===
After a subpar stretch in the late 1970s and early 1980s, the team had a brief resurgence under coach Karl, culminating in a 1987 Western Conference Semifinal match against Magic Johnson and the Los Angeles Lakers that is still shown on TV in the NBA's Greatest Games series. The second-half performance by the Warriors' All-Star point guard Sleepy Floyd still stands as the NBA playoff record for points scored in a quarter (29) and in a half (39). His six consecutive field goals in the fourth quarter led to a 51-point finish for him and a victory for the Warriors.

The "Sleepy Floyd game" catalyzed increased interest in the NBA in the Bay Area; so did new coach Don Nelson, who engineered a string of wins in the late 1980s and early 1990s with the high-scoring trio of point guard Tim Hardaway, guard Mitch Richmond and forward Chris Mullin. Collectively known as "Run TMC" after the rap group Run-D.M.C., the trio stayed together for just two seasons and won only one playoff series. Nelson sent Richmond to the Sacramento Kings for rookie power forward Billy Owens, a promising young front-court player meant to complement the coach's run-and-gun system. Nelson had been brought to the Warriors from the Milwaukee Bucks by Jim Fitzgerald, who co-owned the team from 1986 to 1995 with Dan Finnane. In 1993–94, with first-round draft pick and Rookie of the Year power forward Chris Webber playing with off-guard Latrell Sprewell, the Warriors made the playoffs.

At the start of the next season, however, a rift formed between Webber and Sprewell on the one hand and Nelson on the other. All three soon left the team, and the organization went into a tailspin. The 1994–95 season was the first under new team owner Chris Cohan, who had bought out Fitzgerald and Finnane. The Warriors selected power forward prospect Joe Smith as their first overall draft pick in 1995 and hired Rick Adelman as the new head coach. They sent Tim Hardaway and Chris Gatling to the Miami Heat for Kevin Willis and Bimbo Coles midway through the 1995–96 season, and ended up with a 36–46 record, three wins short of making the playoffs. While their home court, the Oakland Coliseum Arena, was being extensively renovated, the 1996–97 Warriors played their home games in the San Jose Arena and struggled to a 30–52 finish. After the season, Mullin was traded to the Indiana Pacers in exchange for Erick Dampier and Duane Ferrell.

=== 1997–2009: Wilderness years and "We believe" ===
Longtime Seton Hall college coach P. J. Carlesimo, who had been recently fired by the Portland Trail Blazers, replaced Adelman as head coach for the 1997–98 season. Sprewell was suspended for the remainder of the season for losing his temper and choking Carlesimo during a team practice in December, generating the glaring newspaper headline "WARRIORS HIT ROCK BOTTOM" and the declaration by general manager Garry St. Jean that Sprewell would never play for the Warriors again. He would not play in the NBA again until he was dealt in January 1999 to the New York Knicks for John Starks, Chris Mills and Terry Cummings.

St. Jean had become the new Warriors' general manager in July 1997; he and his predecessor Dave Twardzik received much of the blame for the Warriors' struggles early in Cohan's turbulent tenure as owner in addition to Cohan himself. St. Jean brought in players such as Terry Cummings, John Starks and Mookie Blaylock who were well past their primes. Twardzik drafted several flops, such as Todd Fuller (picked over future MVPs Kobe Bryant and Steve Nash and future All Star Jermaine O'Neal) and Steve Logan (who never played an NBA game). In the next draft, the team selected Adonal Foyle, forgoing future All Star Tracy McGrady was still available. St. Jean did, however, draft future two-time NBA slam dunk champion off-guard Jason Richardson (from Michigan State), who would be a Warriors' star scorer through the 2006–07 season.

For a few years, with rising stars Richardson, small forward Antawn Jamison and point guard Gilbert Arenas leading the team, the Warriors seemed like a team on the rise; but the young Warriors did not have enough in the competitive Western Conference to make the playoffs. After the 2002–03 season, St. Jean's earlier mistakes of committing money to players like Danny Fortson, Adonal Foyle and Erick Dampier were painfully felt by Warriors' fans when the team was unable to re-sign Arenas despite his desire to stay in the Bay Area. A new rule was implemented in response to second-round draft picks who quickly become superstars.

In June 2003, Cohan elevated marketing executive Robert Rowell to team president, a role which involved hiring, firing and contract negotiation on the basketball side. After a disappointing 2003–04 season, head coach Eric Musselman and St. Jean were fired. Mike Montgomery was hired as head coach and Chris Mullin was chosen to succeed St. Jean with the title of executive vice president of basketball operations. Mullin hoped to build a winning team around Jason Richardson, Mike Dunleavy Jr and Troy Murphy, and drafted 7-foot center Andris Biedriņš from Latvia (11th overall). At the 2005 trading deadline, he bolstered to the team with the acquisition of point guard Baron Davis, bringing to the team its first superstar since Mullin himself.

The Warriors enjoyed a great start to the 2005–06 season, entering the new year with a plus .500 winning percentage for the first time since 1994, but managed to win only 13 more games through the end of March due to injuries. Davis often found himself at odds with new head coach Mike Montgomery (used to dealing with college players in his long tenure at Stanford) and failed to remain healthy, playing in just 54 games. On April 5, 2006, the Warriors were officially eliminated from playoff contention in a 114–109 overtime loss to the Hornets, extending their playoff drought to 12 seasons.

Entering the 2006–07 season, the Warriors held the active record (12) for the most consecutive seasons without a playoff appearance (see Active NBA non-playoff appearance streaks). During the 2006 off-season, Golden State announced that it had bought out the remaining two years of coach Montgomery's contract and hired previous Golden State and former Dallas Mavericks coach Don Nelson to take over for him. During training camp, small forward Matt Barnes established himself in the rotation. On January 17, 2007, the Warriors traded the disappointing Murphy and Dunleavy with promising young power forward Ike Diogu and Keith McLeod to the Indiana Pacers for forward Al Harrington, forward/guard Stephen Jackson, guard Šarūnas Jasikevičius and forward Josh Powell. This trade allowed the Warriors to "run and gun" their way to the playoffs with a more athletic and talented team. On March 4, 2007, the Warriors suffered a 106–107 loss in Washington, the Wizards handing them their 6th straight loss when former Warrior Arenas hit a technical free throw with less than one second remaining after Nelson had protested a controversial call with the Warriors ahead by a slim margin. The loss dropped them to 26–35.

March 4 marked the turning point for the Warriors. The Warriors closed out the regular season (42–40) at 16–5 in their last 21 games. "We believe" became the Warriors' slogan for the last two months of the season and the playoffs.

Led by a healthy Baron Davis, an ever-improving Jason Richardson and young future star off-guard Monta Ellis as well as center Biedriņš, the Warriors immediately dashed the highly favored top-seed Dallas Mavericks' expectations of a short and easy series win with a Game 1 victory in Dallas thanks to Davis' frantic style of play. The Mavericks came back to win Game 2 easily to tie the series at a game apiece, but the Warriors won both Games 3 and 4 with a huge lift from the home crowd at Oracle Arena. A close Game 5 saw the Mavericks eke out a 118–112 victory with a last-minute surge led by superstar forward Dirk Nowitzki to send the series back to California at 3–2. In Game 6, the Warriors engineered a third-quarter 18–0 run to eliminate the Mavericks and become the NBA's first No. 8 seed to beat a No. 1 seed in a seven-game series (and the first NBA No. 8 seed to beat the top seed since 1999 when the New York Knicks eliminated the Miami Heat). It was an upset in name only, given the fact that the Warriors had swept the Mavericks in the regular-season series.

The Warriors went on to play the Utah Jazz in the second round of the 2006–07 playoffs, where they dropped two close games at EnergySolutions Arena to open the series. The series then shifted to the Oracle Arena, where the Warriors won Game 3 in a convincing fashion. Davis scored 32 points and electrified the crowd with a monster dunk on Jazz forward Andrei Kirilenko late in the fourth quarter, but they lost Game 4 at home, their first loss in Oakland in well over a month and the Jazz closed them out in Game 5 in Salt Lake City.

In the 2007–08 season, the Warriors faced early difficulties in their attempt to return to the playoffs. Richardson was traded to the Charlotte Bobcats for rookie Brandan Wright. To make things even worse, Jackson was suspended for seven games over a firearm incident. They opened the season with six straight losses, but Ellis' rise, Davis' solid injury-free season (21.6 points, 8 assists, 4.6 rebounds per game), and an overall improvement in team chemistry brought them back to playoff contention; but in the end the Warriors failed to make the playoffs despite a 48–34 record, which is the best record in NBA history for a non-playoff team since the NBA playoffs had expanded to eight teams per conference. The Western Conference was very strong that season; every playoff team won 50 games, leaving the Warriors two games out of the last playoff spot. The Warriors sold out nearly every home game during the season averaging 19,631 per game, the highest in team history.

In the 2008 off-season, Baron Davis opted to return to his hometown and sign with the Los Angeles Clippers. With the 14th pick of that year's draft, the Warriors selected and signed Anthony Randolph out of LSU. To compensate for the loss of Davis, the Warriors signed free agents Corey Maggette and Ronny Turiaf and re-signed Ellis and Andris Biedriņš to long-term contracts.

The Warriors had a disappointing 2008–09 season, finishing 29–53. Ellis was injured in a moped accident, and suspended for 30 games for riding the vehicle against the terms of his contract, depriving the Warriors of their top player. They traded disenchanted forward Al Harrington to the New York Knicks for guard Jamal Crawford, and were undone by injuries and the minimal experience of their young players such as Anthony Morrow and Brandan Wright. Coach Nelson often had to make adjustments to the starting lineups since many of the original starters missed games due to injuries. Despite the team's losing record, the Warriors were hard to beat when they had a healthy lineup and a strong bench. With leadership and improvement in their young players, they were sometimes able to defeat powerhouse teams such as the Boston Celtics, 99–89.

=== 2009–present: The Stephen Curry era ===
==== 2009–2012: Continued struggles and strategic draft picks ====
The Warriors chose future superstar point guard Stephen Curry of Davidson College as the seventh overall pick in the 2009 NBA draft. During the 2009 off-season, Warrior ownership declined to renew the contract of general manager Chris Mullin. Larry Riley, Nelson's longtime assistant coach, was promoted in his place; Riley drafted Curry and traded Jamal Crawford to the Atlanta Hawks for Acie Law and Speedy Claxton.

The Warriors had another injury-prone year in 2009–10 as they were consistently unable to field their ideal starting lineup. In November, a malcontented Stephen Jackson and seldom-used Acie Law were traded to the Charlotte Bobcats for Raja Bell (out for the season with an injury) and Vladimir Radmanovic. Four days later, they signed center Chris Hunter. Starting in January 2010, they issued multiple 10-day contracts, most notably to power forward Anthony Tolliver from the Idaho Stampede. Due to their multiple injuries, they were granted an exception allowing them to sign Reggie Williams from the Sioux Falls Skyforce to a 10-day contract on March 2. They eventually waived the injured Bell to sign Williams for the rest of the year and finished the season 26–56, failing to make the playoffs. Curry finished second in the NBA Rookie of the Year voting to the Sacramento Kings' Tyreke Evans and was named to the NBA All-Rookie First Team.

The Warriors selected Ekpe Udoh, a power forward from Baylor, as the 6th pick of the 2010 NBA draft. They also introduced a modernized version of their "The City" logo depicting the new eastern span of the San Francisco-Oakland Bay Bridge, and switched to a simplified color scheme of royal blue and gold. They also introduced new uniforms reminiscent of the 1969–71 "The City" uniforms. The Warriors made an off-season trade that sent Turiaf, Randolph and Kelenna Azubuike to the New York Knicks in return for star high-scoring power forward David Lee via a sign-and-trade. Lee agreed to a six-year, $80 million deal that depended on the decision of superstar forward LeBron James to leave the Cleveland Cavaliers to sign with the Miami Heat that same day. After Morrow left for New Jersey Nets, the Warriors signed Dorell Wright, formerly with the Miami Heat, to a three-year, $11 million deal.

On July 15, 2010, owner Chris Cohan sold the Warriors to Peter Guber of Mandalay Entertainment and his partner Joe Lacob for a then-record $450 million. On November 15, the Warriors announced the new 19-person ownership group composed of Joe Lacob, Peter Guber, Vivek Ranadivé, Erika Glazer, Fred Harman, Bob Piccinini, Larry Bowman, Danny German, Marty Glick, Chad Hurley, Craig R. Johnson, Bruce Karsh, Jeffrey A. Miller, Paul Schaeffer, David Scially, Nick Swinmurn, Harry Tsao, John Walecka, Dennis Wong and Chamath Palihapitiya.

The Warriors continued their 2010 off-season signing spree by adding Harvard guard Jeremy Lin to their roster with a one-year partially guaranteed contract containing a second-year team option; Lin became the first Taiwanese-American player in NBA history. Louis Amundson was then added for little under $5 million in mid-September. After coach Don Nelson resigned in September 2010, assistant coach Keith Smart was hired as the team's new head coach.

The Warriors won 36 games and failed to make the playoffs in 2010–11. The team broke a franchise record with 21 made three-pointers in a win against the Orlando Magic. In February 2011, the Warriors traded Brandan Wright and Dan Gadzuric for Troy Murphy and a 2012 second-round pick that was used on Draymond Green. On February 27, Murphy and the Warriors reached a buyout agreement and he was waived. In April 2011, Dorell Wright made a franchise record of 184 three-pointers in a season in a home win versus Los Angeles Lakers, surpassing Richardson's 183 in 2005–06. In a win against the Portland Trail Blazers, Wright then broke another NBA record, becoming the first player to have scored more points in his seventh season than in all his first six seasons combined. Wright ended the season with the most three-pointers made in the NBA that season with 194, as well as the most three-pointers attempted with 516; each mark set a new Warriors franchise record. After the season, Curry received the NBA Sportsmanship Award. Coach Smart was dismissed on April 27, 2011, due to the change in ownership. Team President Rowell was also fired and replaced with Rick Welts. Seventeen-year NBA veteran and former ABC and ESPN commentator Mark Jackson replaced Smart as head coach on June 6.

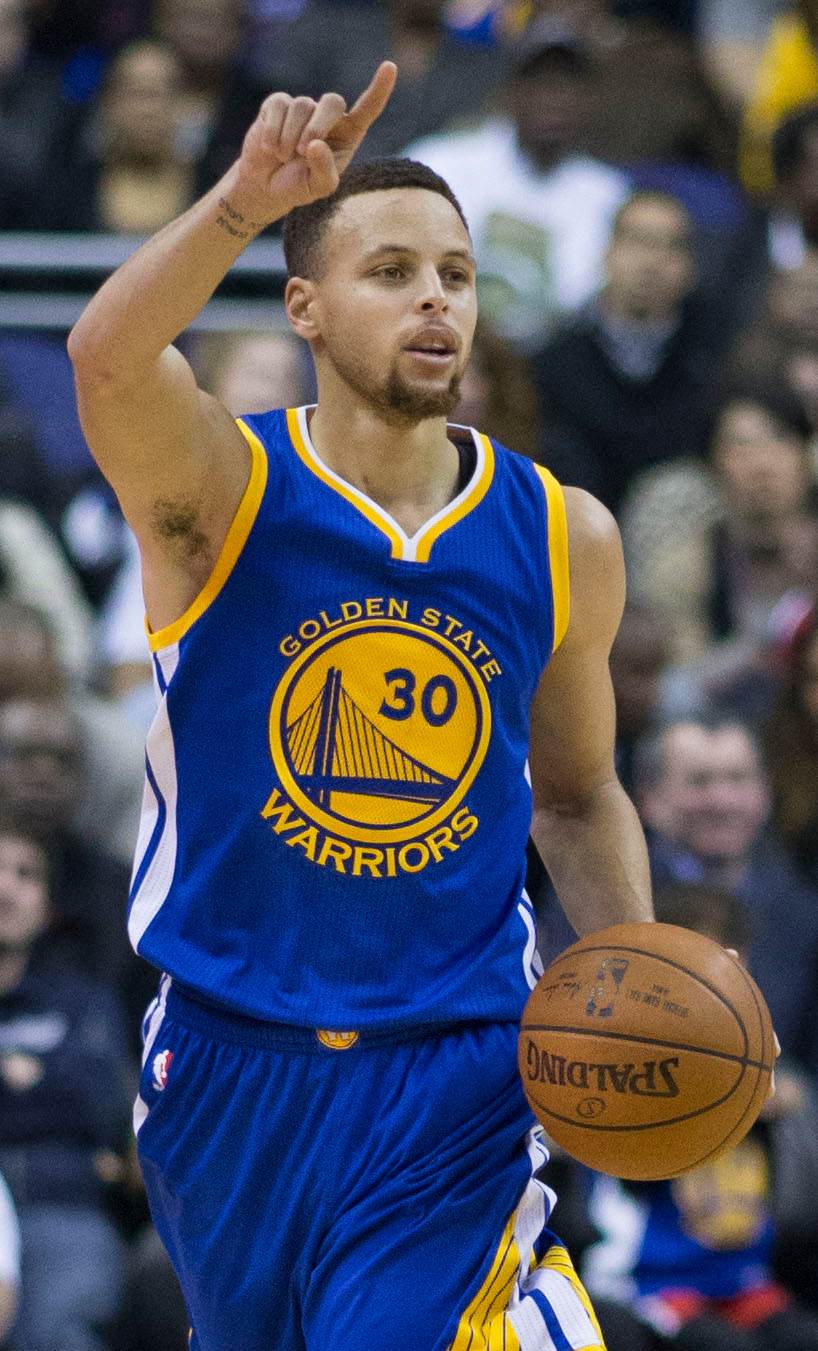
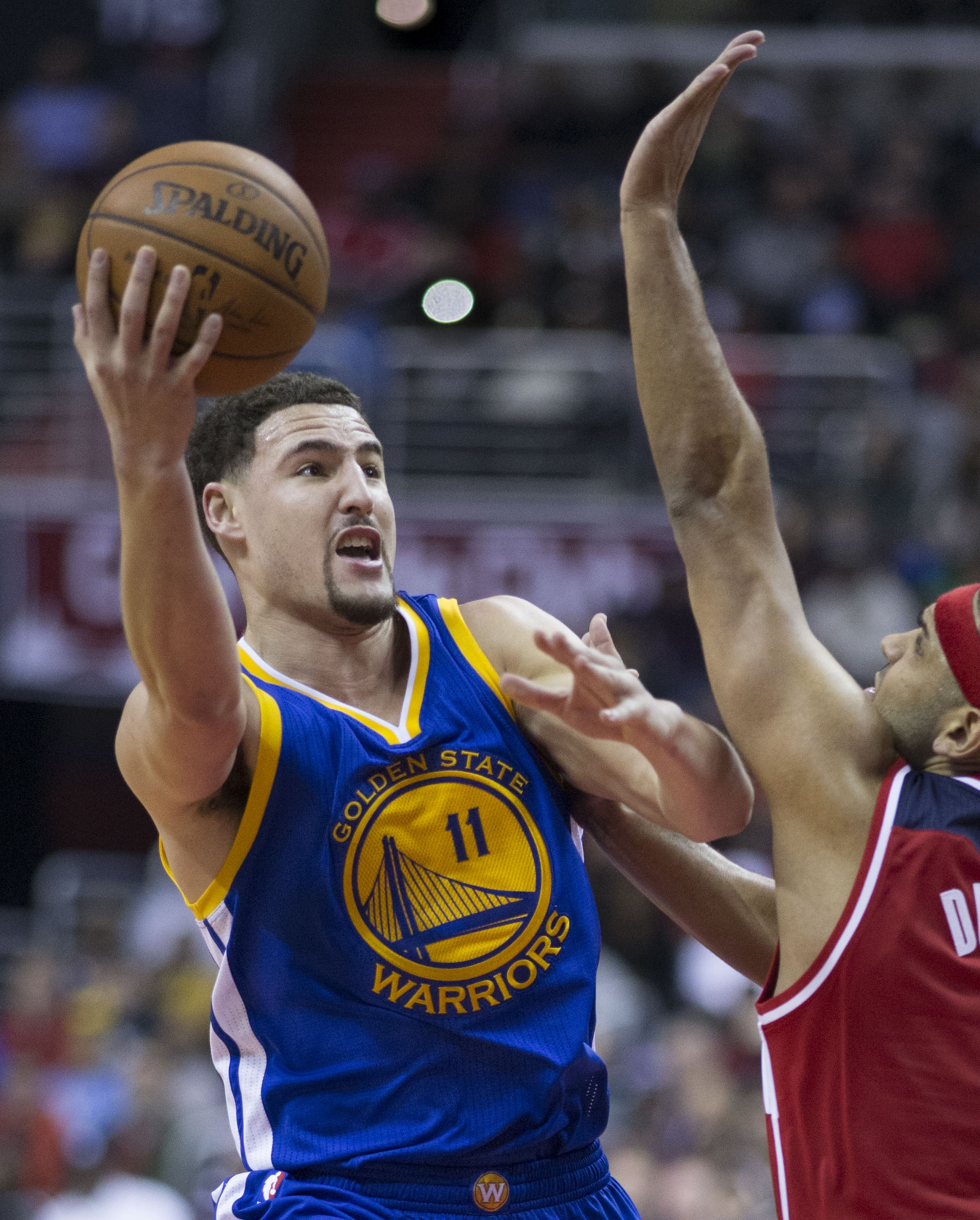
The "Splash Brothers": Stephen Curry (left) and Klay Thompson (right)

The Warriors selected future All-Star shooting guard Klay Thompson with the 11th pick in the 2011 NBA draft. However, the team did not improve in the 2011–12 NBA season under coach Jackson, finishing the lockout-shortened season with a 23–43 record (13th in the conference) and again failing to make the playoffs. Due to the 2011 NBA lockout, Jackson could not establish his system in training camp. Hindered by several injuries to key players, the team then entered into another chaotic rebuilding phase. Team leader Monta Ellis was traded in mid-March 2012, along with Kwame Brown and Ekpe Udoh, to the Milwaukee Bucks for center Andrew Bogut (out injured for the season) and former Warrior small forward Stephen Jackson, who without playing a game for the Warriors was quickly traded to the San Antonio Spurs for Richard Jefferson and a conditional first-round pick on March 15. These moves saw the rise of Stephen Curry and David Lee to team co-captains, and saw Thompson move into a starting role. However, Curry suffered a series of ankle and foot-related injuries that limited him to 26 regular-season games.

==== 2012–2014: The ascension ====
The Warriors' 2012 off-season moves changed the course of the franchise. In the 2012 draft, the Warriors selected small forward Harrison Barnes with the 7th overall pick, center Festus Ezeli with the 30th pick, small forward Draymond Green with the 35th pick, and 7-foot-1 center Ognjen Kuzmic with the 52nd pick. According to sportswriter Anthony Slater, in this draft, "Golden State got a starter [Barnes], a rotation player [Ezeli] and a transcendent talent that perfectly fit the small-ball direction of the league [Green]." In addition, Curry agreed to a four-year, $44 million rookie scale contract extension. At the time, many basketball writers considered the move risky for Golden State because of Curry's injury history. In 2016, however, Slater argued that Curry's relatively inexpensive contract paid "huge dividends" by freeing up the necessary funds to allow the team to "keep a strong core around him". The team made a series of other moves, trading Dorell Wright, obtaining point guard Jarrett Jack, and signing forward Carl Landry.

Despite early-season injuries to Brandon Rush and Andrew Bogut, and despite starting two rookies (Barnes and Ezeli), the 2012–13 Warriors had one of their best starts in decades. The team earned 20 wins in less than 30 games played for the first time since 1992. The Warriors also achieved a milestone by completing their first ever 6–1 road trip in franchise history, including a 97–95 win over the defending champion Heat in Miami. On April 9, 2013, with a win over the Minnesota Timberwolves, the Warriors clinched the playoffs for the second time in 19 years and the first time since the 2006–07 "We Believe" Warriors. This time, the local battle cry was "We Belong". The team finished the season with a record of 47–35, earning the sixth seed in the Western Conference, and defeated the Denver Nuggets in the first round of the playoffs by winning four out of six games. They lost in the second round to the San Antonio Spurs, four games to two. This was the first playoff experience for all of the starters of this group except for Andrew Bogut. Other highlights of the season included Stephen Curry's 272 three-point baskets (an NBA single-season record for the player nicknamed "baby-faced assassin") and the naming of forward David Lee to the 2013 NBA All-Star Game as a reserve, ending the team's 16-year drought without an All Star selection. Curry and Klay Thompson, dubbed the "Splash Brothers" by team employee Brian Witt for their backcourt shooting, combined for 483 three-pointers, easily besting the single-season record of 435 set by the Orlando Magic's Nick Anderson and Dennis Scott in 1995–96.

During the 2013 off-season, Golden State signed former Denver Nuggets swingman and future NBA Finals MVP Andre Iguodala to a four-year, $48 million deal. To make room under the salary cap, the Warriors traded Richard Jefferson, Andris Biedriņš and Brandon Rush (along with multiple draft picks) to the Utah Jazz. With their lone selection in the 2013 NBA draft, the Warriors made 22-year-old Serbian combo-guard Nemanja Nedovic the 30th and final pick of the first round. Other off-season changes included the departure of free agents Jarrett Jack and Carl Landry and the signings of forward-center Marreese Speights, center Jermaine O'Neal, point guard Toney Douglas, and Serbian center Ognjen Kuzmic.

The Warriors began the 2013–14 season showing flashes of brilliance and also plenty of lapses. In early December their record was 12–9, as compared to 17–4 the year before. One challenging factor was a tough starting schedule that saw them play 14 of their first 22 games on the road, including 10 games against teams holding playoff spots in the standings. A stream of injuries also held the team back, including injuries to Ezeli, Douglas, and O'Neal. Most prominently, Iguodala suffered a hamstring pull in late November that kept him out for over a month; during this period, the Warriors' defensive and offensive performance suffered and the team posted a losing 5–7 record while revealing a lack of bench depth. When Iguodala returned, the Warriors went on a 10-game winning streak that included six wins on a road trip, tying an NBA record. The streak was the franchise's longest since the 1975 championship year, and fell just one win short of the team record of 11.

To strengthen their bench, the Warriors made a three-team trade on January 15, sending Douglas to the Miami Heat and picking up guards Jordan Crawford and MarShon Brooks from the Boston Celtics. A day before the trade deadline, the Warriors traded Kent Bazemore and Brooks to the Los Angeles Lakers in exchange for veteran point guard Steve Blake. Boosted by the additions of Blake and Crawford and the play of 35-year-old Jermaine O'Neal (who returned sooner than expected from wrist surgery), the Warriors were one of the winningest teams in the NBA after the All-Star break. On April 11, in a 112–95 stomping of the Los Angeles Lakers at the Staples Center, the Warriors clinched a playoff berth in consecutive seasons for the first time since 1991 and 1992. However, just one day earlier in a loss against the Portland Trail Blazers, Andrew Bogut suffered a cracked rib kept him out of the postseason; the injury dealt a blow to the sixth-seed Warriors' playoff hopes.

Even as the team rolled towards the postseason, signs emerged of trouble in the Warriors' front office. On March 25, the team reassigned assistant coach Brian Scalabrine to the team's NBA Development League Affiliate in Santa Cruz because of what head coach Mark Jackson called a "difference in philosophies" and what unnamed league sources cited by Yahoo! Sports called "an increasingly dysfunctional atmosphere" on the Warriors' coaching staff. Less than two weeks later, assistant coach Darren Erman was fired for secretly recording conversations between coaches, staff and players.

The Warriors ended the season with a record of 51–31. The team won more than 50 games for only the fourth time in franchise history, finished 20 games over .500 for the first time in 22 years, and tied the 1991–92 squad for the franchise's all-time mark of 24 wins on the road. Even without Bogut, the Warriors battled the third-seed Los Angeles Clippers to a seventh and deciding game in the first round of the playoffs before their 2013–14 season came to an end. It was a season of many thrilling moments; the Warriors played in 17 regular-season games decided by two points or fewer, six games decided by winning shots in the final three seconds, and seven comeback wins in which the Warriors had been behind by 15 points or more. Curry also made his first appearance in the All-Star Game in 2014. Curry and Klay Thompson continued to set league records in three-point shooting. Curry, who finished the season with 261 threes, set an individual record for most three-pointers in a span of two seasons with 533, surpassing the previous mark of 478 set by former Seattle SuperSonics legend Ray Allen in 2004–05 and 2005–06. Together, Thompson and Curry combined for 484 threes on the year, besting by one the NBA record they had set the year before.

==== 2014–2019: The dynasty ====
Jackson was fired as coach on May 6, 2014, despite a unanimous declaration of support from his players and a three-year 121–109 (.526) record that marked a major turnaround and placed him fourth on the franchise's all-time wins list, trailing Alvin Attles (557), Don Nelson (422) and Eddie Gottlieb (263). Over the 17 years before Jackson took the helm in 2011, the franchise had averaged 30.2 wins per season and made the playoffs only once. Jackson became just the third Warriors head coach to notch at least 50 wins in a season, joining Nelson and Attles, who both hit the mark twice.

On May 14, 2014, the Golden State Warriors signed Steve Kerr to a reported five-year, $25 million deal to become the team's new head coach. It was the first head-coach job for Kerr, 48, a five-time NBA champion guard who set an all-time career record for accuracy in three-point shooting (.454). Kerr had served as president and general manager for the Phoenix Suns basketball team from 2007 to 2010, and had recently been working as an NBA broadcast analyst for Turner Network Television (TNT). The Warriors also signed point guard Shaun Livingston and guard Leandro Barbosa during the off-season.

The Warriors completed the 2014–2015 regular season with a league-best record of 67–15, setting a Warriors record for wins. The team finished with a home record of 39–2, second-best in NBA history. The team ranked first in defensive efficiency for the season and second in offensive efficiency, barely missing the mark that the Julius Erving-led Sixers achieved by being first in both offensive and defensive efficiency. On May 4, Stephen Curry was named the 2014–15 NBA Most Valuable Player, the first Warrior since Wilt Chamberlain in 1960.

The Warriors swept the New Orleans Pelicans in the first round of the playoffs, defeated Memphis Grizzlies in six games in the second round, and dispatched Houston Rockets in five games in the Western Conference Finals. The Warriors advanced to their first NBA Finals since 1975. The team's opponent was the Cleveland Cavaliers, who would later go on to face the Warriors in each of the next three consecutive NBA Finals. After Golden State fell behind 2–1 in the series, Kerr gave swingman Andre Iguodala his first start of the season, replacing center Andrew Bogut in Game 4. The Warriors' small lineup (which came to be known as the Death Lineup) helped turn the series around. The Warriors defeated the Cavaliers in six games, and Iguodala was named Finals MVP. Kerr became the first rookie coach to win a title since Pat Riley in 1981–82.

Other highlights of the 2014–15 season included Stephen Curry breaking his own record for three-pointers made in a single season with 286. He and Klay Thompson made a combined 525 three-pointers, the most by a duo in NBA history. In the postseason, Curry shattered Reggie Miller's record of 58 made three-pointers in a single postseason with 98. On January 23, 2015, Klay Thompson broke an NBA record for points in a quarter with 37 in the third. Curry was also the leader in the voting polls for the 2015 NBA All-Star Game, won the 2014–15 NBA Most Valuable Player award and the 2015 ESPYs Best Male Athlete award.

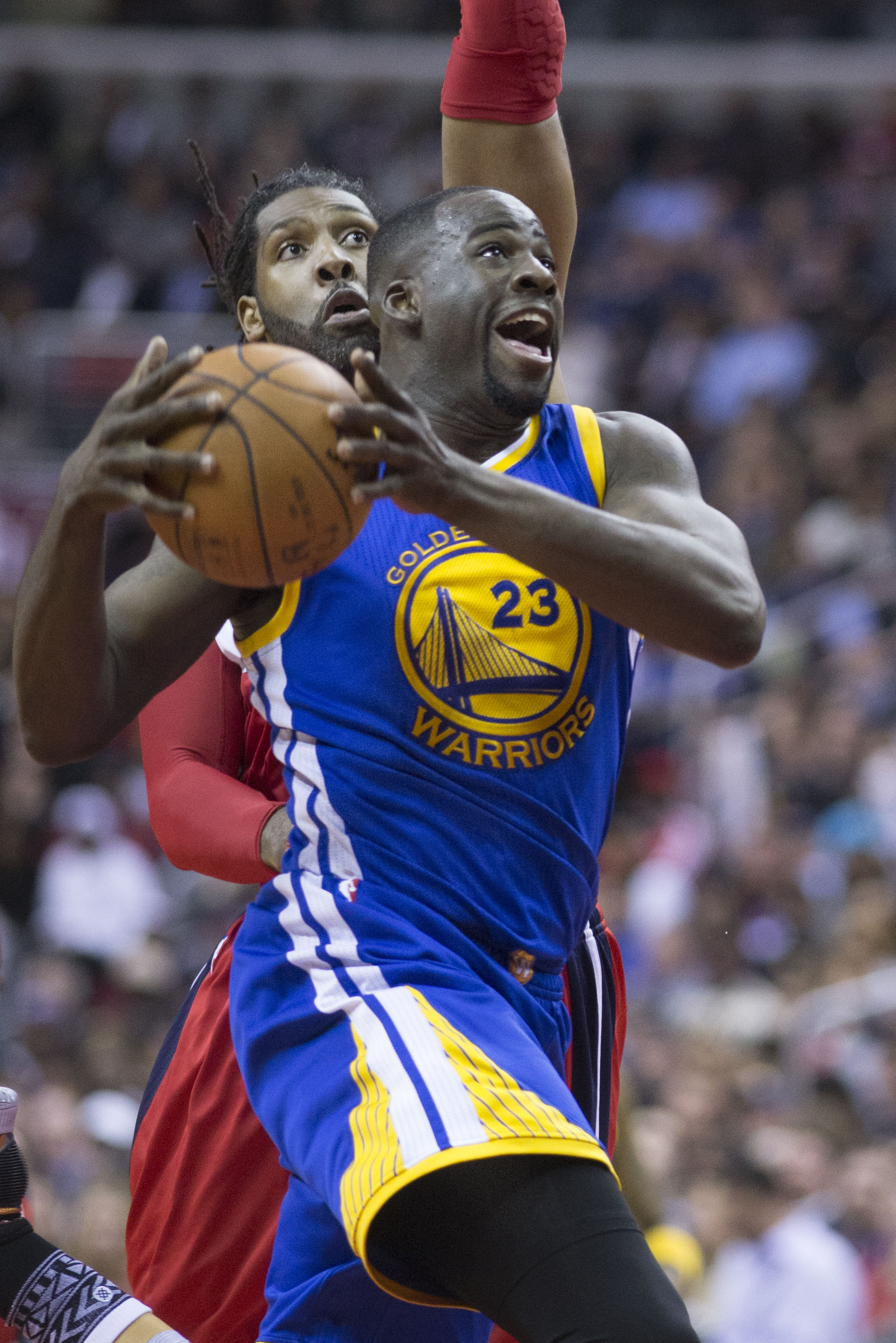
Draymond Green was an All-NBA Second Team member in 2015–16.

On July 27, 2015, David Lee—who had lost his starting power forward job to Draymond Green during the season—was traded to the Boston Celtics in exchange for Gerald Wallace and Chris Babb; Golden State was seeking to offload his salary given his limited role on the team.

The Warriors began the 2015–2016 regular season by winning their first 24 games, the best start in NBA history. This surpassed the previous record of 15–0 by the 1948–49 Capitols and the 1993–94 Rockets, and broke a 131-year-old record of 20–0 set by the 1884 St. Louis Maroons baseball team, to claim the best start to a season in all of the major professional sports in America. These 24 wins included the best road start in NBA history at 14–0, surpassing the 1969–70 New York Knicks, which was also the joint-third longest road win streak. Their record-setting start ended when they were defeated by the Milwaukee Bucks on December 12, 2015. Golden State also won 28 consecutive regular-season games dating back to the 2014–15 season, eclipsing the 2012–13 Miami Heat for the second longest winning streak in NBA history. The team set an NBA record with 54 consecutive regular-season home wins, which spanned from January 31, 2015, to March 29, 2016; the previous record of 44 was held by the 1995–96 Chicago Bulls team led by Michael Jordan.

On March 31, 2016, the Warriors won their 68th win of the season in an overtime game over the Utah Jazz, breaking the franchise record for most wins in a single season in franchise history. On April 13, 2016, Golden State set the NBA record for most wins in a single season. The team finished the season with a record of 73–9. On May 10, 2016, Stephen Curry was named the NBA's Most Valuable Player (MVP) for the second straight season. Curry is the 11th player to win back-to-back MVP honors and became the first player in NBA history to win the MVP award by unanimous vote, winning all 131 first-place votes. Stephen Curry, Draymond Green and Klay Thompson were all named to the 2016 All-Star Game. Green broke the Golden State franchise record of nine triple-doubles in a season. Curry broke numerous three-point records during the season, including his own NBA record for made three-pointers in a season of 286; he finished the season with 402 three-pointers. He made a three-pointer in 151 consecutive games, which broke the NBA record of 127 set by Kyle Korver in 2014. On February 27, 2016, Curry also tied the NBA record of twelve three-pointers made in a single game, jointly holding it with Donyell Marshall and Kobe Bryant.

The Warriors reached the NBA Finals for the second consecutive year, facing a rematch against the Cleveland Cavaliers. The Warriors won three of the first four games of the 2016 NBA Finals, but the Cavaliers made a comeback to tie the series at three wins apiece. Draymond Green was suspended for Game Five of the series, and Curry was ejected from Game Six. In Game Seven, the Warriors lost the series on their home court, earning the distinction of becoming the first team to lose the NBA Finals after having led three games to one.

July 2016 featured a series of significant player transactions. On July 4, 2016, Kevin Durant announced he was leaving the Oklahoma City Thunder to sign a two-year contract with the Golden State Warriors. On July 7, Durant signed his contract, which gave the Warriors a fourth All-NBA player on their team. The Durant signing made the Warriors prohibitive favorites to win the 2017 NBA championship, according to oddsmakers. On July 9, 2016, free-agent forward Harrison Barnes signed with the Dallas Mavericks. Centers Festus Ezeli and Marreese Speights left the Warriors for other teams, as did guard Leandro Barbosa. Center Andrew Bogut was traded, along with a future second-round pick, to the Dallas Mavericks in exchange for a future conditional second-round pick. Veteran power forward David West signed with the Warriors, as did free-agent center Zaza Pachulia.

The Warriors posted many notable achievements during the 2016–17 regular season. On November 7, 2016, Stephen Curry set the NBA record for most 3-pointers in a game with 13, in a 116–106 win over the Pelicans. On December 5, 2016, Klay Thompson scored 60 points in 29 minutes, in a 142–106 victory over the Pacers. In doing so, Thompson became the first player in NBA history to score 60 or more points in fewer than 30 minutes of playing time. Stephen Curry, Kevin Durant, Draymond Green, and Klay Thompson were all named to the 2017 NBA All-Star Game, making the Warriors only the eighth team in NBA history to have four All-Stars. On February 10, 2017, Draymond Green recorded a triple-double with 12 rebounds, 10 assists, and 10 steals, becoming the first player in NBA history to post a triple-double with fewer than 10 points. On March 2, 2017, the Warriors' streak for most games without back-to-back losses ended at 146 with a 94–87 loss to the Chicago Bulls. The streak eclipsed the previous record of 95 held by the Utah Jazz.

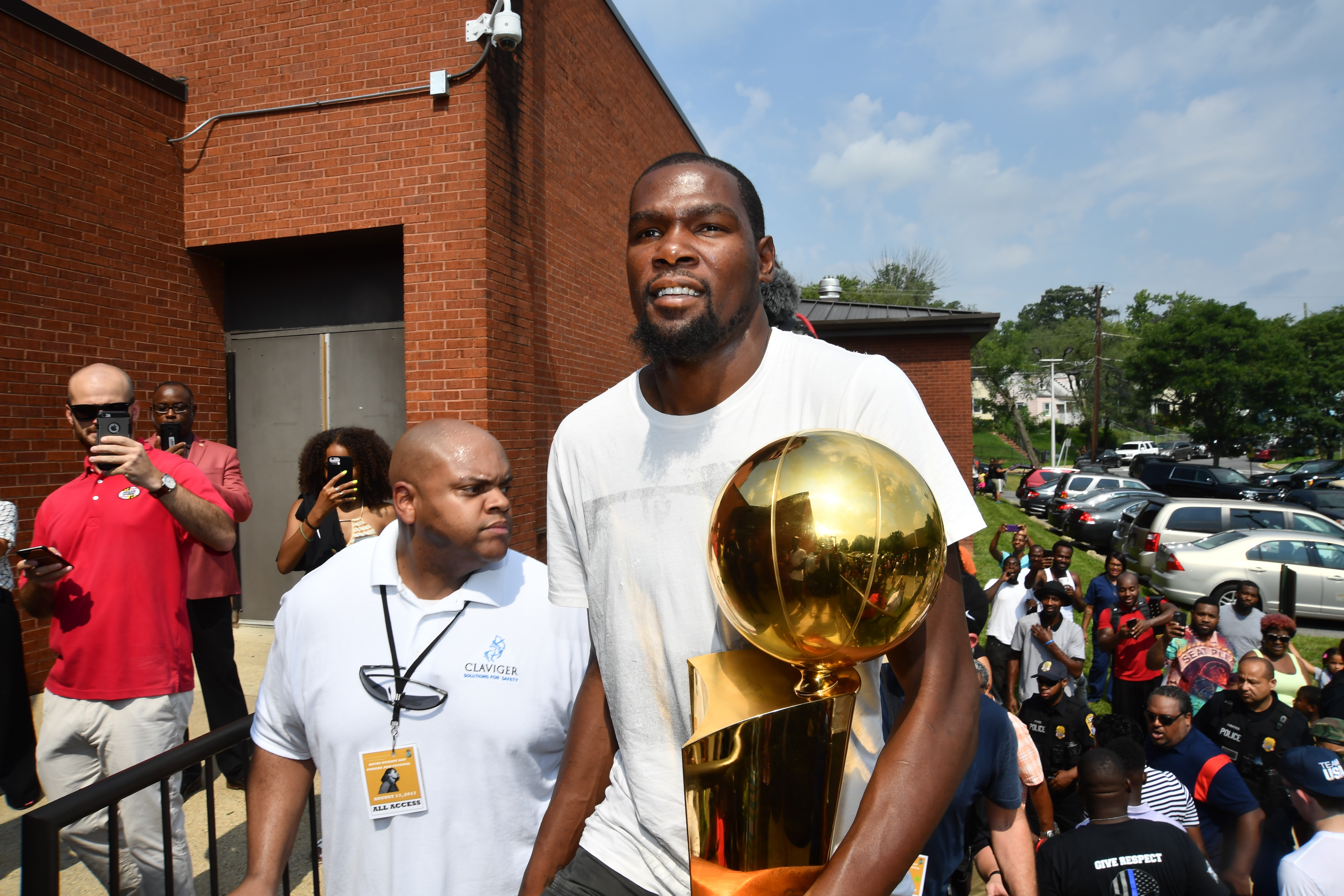
Kevin Durant won back-to-back Finals MVPs during the Warriors' 2017 and 2018 championship seasons.

The Warriors earned home-court advantage throughout the 2017 playoffs, thanks to a 2016–17 regular-season record of 67–15. They were the first team in NBA playoff history to start the playoffs 12–0, defeating the Trail Blazers, the Jazz, and the Spurs in consecutive series. The 2017 Finals once again pitted the Warriors against the Cavaliers, becoming the first time in NBA history that two teams met in the Finals for three consecutive years. The Warriors won the championship after going 4–1 in the Finals, and their 16–1 playoff record garnered the best winning percentage (.941) in NBA playoffs history. After the Warriors announced that they were uncertain if they would make the customary visit to the White House by playoff champions, President Donald Trump rescinded his invitation. The team still planned to travel to Washington, D.C. to "celebrate equality, diversity and inclusion." Planned activities included meeting with local youth and a visit to the National Museum of African-American History and Culture.

The Warriors went into the 2018 playoffs as the second seed in the Western Conference after earning a 2017–18 regular season record of 58–24. After defeating both the Spurs and the Pelicans 4–1, the Warriors came up against the top-seeded Houston Rockets in the Western Conference Finals. Despite reaching a 3–2 disadvantage against the Rockets after Game 5, the Warriors staved off elimination and came back to win the series 4–3, winning the Western Conference for the 4th straight year. The 2018 Finals pitted the Warriors against the Cavaliers for the fourth consecutive season; this marked the first time in NBA history that the same two teams had met in the Finals for four consecutive years. The Warriors swept the Cavaliers to win their second straight NBA championship; previously, there had not been an NBA Finals sweep since 2007. On August 30, 2018, David West announced his retirement from the NBA after 15 seasons. After the 2018 NBA Finals, writers for Sports Illustrated, USA Today, The Wall Street Journal, and the New York Daily News described the Warriors as a dynasty. The Warriors returned to the Finals the following year and lost 4–2 to the Toronto Raptors.

==== 2019–2021: Return to San Francisco and injury struggles ====
In April 2014, the Warriors began the purchase process for a 12-acre (4.9 ha) site in Mission Bay, San Francisco, to hold a new 18,000-seat arena, which was expected to be ready for the 2019–20 NBA season. The location was selected after an original proposal to construct the arena on Piers 30 and 32, just south of the Bay Bridge, met with vocal opposition due to concerns about traffic, environmental effects, and obstruction of views. The new location still faced some vocal opposition in San Francisco but did not require the voter approval needed for the original site. The move was also criticized for alienating fans in Oakland. The sale was finalized in October 2015 and naming rights were sold to JPMorgan Chase, which named the arena called Chase Center. Although the Warriors considered a name change, possibly returning to their former name of San Francisco Warriors, it was ultimately decided that they would remain the Golden State Warriors upon their return to San Francisco.

After the Finals loss to Toronto, during which Durant tore his Achilles and Thompson tore his ACL, Durant chose to sign a four-year deal with the Brooklyn Nets. In order to not lose Durant for nothing, the Warriors sent Durant along with a protected first-round pick (2020) to the Nets in exchange for D'Angelo Russell in a two-way sign-and-trade. The sign-and-trade triggered a hard cap for the Warriors, who were forced to trade Iguodala's $17 million salary to the Memphis Grizzlies while also giving them a top-4 protected 2024 first-round pick as an incentive.

The Warriors played their first regular-season game at Chase Center on October 24, 2019, in a 141–122 loss to the Los Angeles Clippers. During their very next home game, on October 30 against the Phoenix Suns, Curry broke his hand in a collision, requiring surgery that was expected to keep him out of action for at least 3 months. This, along with Thompson's injury rehab keeping him out the entire year, sent the Warriors into a downward spiral from which they never recovered. However, they saw second-round pick Eric Paschall, two-way player Damion Lee, and training camp pickup Marquese Chriss establish themselves as rotation players. At the trade deadline, the Warriors traded Russell, 2018 first-round pick Jacob Evans, and recent acquisition Omari Spellman to the Minnesota Timberwolves in exchange for Andrew Wiggins, a top-3 protected first-round pick, and a second-round pick. Curry returned for one game on March 5 before the season was suspended due to the COVID-19 pandemic. The Warriors were not one of the 22 teams invited to the NBA Bubble on June 4, which ended their 2019–20 season with a league-worst record of 15–50.

In the 2020 NBA draft lottery, the Warriors landed the second overall pick in the draft, which they used to draft James Wiseman. They also drafted Nico Mannion with the 48th overall pick. Just as the 2020–21 NBA season was about to begin, guard Klay Thompson was reported to miss the incoming season due to an Achilles tendon injury making the second season he missed in his career. At the beginning of the season against the Nets, Curry dropped 20 points to a 99–125 loss to the Nets. They finished the regular season with a 39–33 record, qualifying for the new NBA play-in-tournament against the seventh seeded Los Angeles Lakers. Curry won his second scoring title with 32.0 points per game and was in the NBA Most Valuable Player conversation alongside Philadelphia's Joel Embiid and Denver's Nikola Jokić, who would go on to win the award. The Warriors were eliminated from the playoffs after losing two play-in tournaments to the Los Angeles Lakers who would become the seventh seed, and the Memphis Grizzlies, originally the ninth seed, who went on to face the Jazz after winning the play-in against the Warriors. This was the second consecutive year that the Warriors missed the playoffs.

==== 2021–2022: Championship glory ====
With the 2021 NBA draft lottery, the Warriors landed the seventh pick in the draft from the Minnesota Timberwolves from the D'Angelo Russell trade, and their own 14th overall pick. With the seventh overall pick, the Warriors selected the NBA G League Ignite's forward Jonathan Kuminga and with the 14th overall pick, the Warriors selected Arkansas guard Moses Moody. The Warriors re-signed Curry to a four-year extension deal worth up to $215 million. They also acquired Magic forward Otto Porter Jr. and Heat forward Nemanja Bjelica to one-year deals. On August 10, 2021, Andre Iguodala signed a deal to come back to the Bay Area.

In January 2022, the team faced controversy after part-owner Chamath Palihapitiya repeatedly stated on a podcast that he did not care about the ongoing persecution of Uyghurs in China. The team distanced themselves from Palihapitiya stating that he "does not speak on behalf of our franchise, and his views certainly don't reflect those of our organization." The Warriors' statement was criticized for not mentioning the Uyghurs or the genocide.

On April 10, 2022, the Warriors clinched the third seed in the Western conference, qualifying for the playoffs for the first time since the 2018–19 season. In the first round, they advanced past the Denver Nuggets, and triumphed over the Memphis Grizzlies in the conference semi-finals. On May 26, 2022, the Warriors advanced to their twelfth NBA Finals in franchise history after defeating the Dallas Mavericks in the Western Conference Finals, 4–1. On June 16, 2022, the team won their seventh NBA title, beating the Boston Celtics 4–2. Curry, Thompson, Green, and Iguodala all won their fourth championship as members of the Warriors.

In 2021, the Golden State Warriors, among other high-profile athletes and celebrities, were a paid spokespersons for FTX, a cryptocurrency exchange. In November 2022, FTX filed for bankruptcy, wiping out billions of dollars in customer funds. The Warriors, alongside other spokespeople, are currently being sued for promoting unregistered securities through a class-action lawsuit. In February 2022, the U.S. 11th Circuit Court of Appeals ruled in a lawsuit against Bitconnect that the Securities Act of 1933 extends to targeted solicitation using social media.

==== 2022–2023: Injury struggles ====
During the 2022–23 season, the Warriors were hampered by injuries to Iguodala, DiVincenzo, Thompson, Green, Kuminga, and Curry, the latter of whom was also unable to participate in the 2023 NBA All-Star Game.

The team finished with the sixth seed and a 44–38 record, qualifying for the last direct playoff spot. In the playoffs, they overcame a 0–2 deficit to beat the third-seeded Sacramento Kings in seven games. In the Western Conference semifinals, they lost to the seventh-seeded Los Angeles Lakers in six games. This was the first time since 2014 that the Warriors lost in the playoffs before reaching the Finals, and the first playoff series loss against a Western Conference opponent under Steve Kerr.

== Logos and uniforms ==
=== Philadelphia ===
As the Philadelphia Warriors, their uniforms generally featured the shortened city name "PHILA" in front, with a few adjustments to the striping and color scheme on the letters. Home uniforms were white and road uniforms were blue with gold accents, with red added during the late 1940s.

=== San Francisco: "The City" ===
Moving to San Francisco in 1962, the Warriors incorporated a similar uniform to the one they previously wore in Philadelphia, but for the first season they wore gold road uniforms with the city name in blue with red drop shadows. In the 1963–64 season, the gold and blue were reversed on the road uniform. In both seasons, the home white uniform featured the city name in gold with blue drop shadows.

From 1964 to 1966, the Warriors updated their uniform, going with the team name in block letters and incorporated the interlocking "SF" similar to the San Francisco Giants' cap logo on the shorts. The home uniform color was changed to gold and red was dropped from the color scheme.

For the remainder of their run as the San Francisco Warriors, they wore what is now known as "The CITY" uniform. The design incorporated a silhouette of the Golden Gate Bridge inside a circle and an upward sloping San Francisco cable car on the front and back of the uniform respectively. Numbers were placed within these logos. Within the contrasting side stripes is the team name in block letters, and the "Indian Headdress" roundel logo was placed on the left leg.

=== California outline (1971–1988) ===
Upon moving to Oakland and adopting the name Golden State Warriors in 1971, the team began wearing uniforms that featured "Golden State" in Western-style lettering above a circle with the outline of California and a star representing the San Francisco Bay Area inside. This uniform was worn until the 1975 championship season, although some uniforms also featured the team name below the circle.

Ahead of the 1975–76 season, the Warriors tweaked the uniform to feature the team name in Western-style lettering along with a fancier number design. Additional striping was placed on the shorts. This design remained in place until the 1987–88 season, though the team made some subtle changes to the striping and letter scheme. Before the 1986–87 season, the home uniform was changed back to white, though the team briefly flirted with wearing white uniforms on select home games in the early 1980s.

=== Run TMC era uniform (1988–1997) ===
In 1988, the Warriors updated their uniform, now featuring the team name written diagonally in front along with numbers on the left chest. The updated "California outline" logo was moved to the left leg. This uniform was introduced in time for the arrival of Don Nelson as head coach and the rise of Run TMC.

=== Thunder era (1997–2010) ===
The Warriors identity was drastically changed in the 1997–98 season, now featuring a dark navy blue, bright gold and orange color scheme. The uniform heavily incorporated the lightning bolt motif, with the gold "Warriors" wordmark now featuring the lightning bolt shooting atop the "W". The alternate "Thunder" logo was added to the right leg.

Before the 2001–02 season, the Warriors made subtle changes to the uniform, removing the lightning bolt stripes in favor of a thick orange stripe on either side. The "Warriors" wordmark also removed the lightning bolt on the "W", and on the white uniform, it was reverted to navy blue letters. In the 2004–05 season, the Warriors added an orange alternate uniform which is a palette swap of their home uniform.

=== Return to classic look (2010–2017) ===
In 2010, the Warriors returned to a modern version of the team's "The CITY" uniform, this time incorporating the San Francisco–Oakland Bay Bridge as part of the logo. The uniform also incorporated striping inspired by the bridge's suspension cables. During Christmas Day games between 2013 and 2016, the Warriors would subtly tweak their uniforms to match every other team's designs

Midway through the 2012–13 season, the Warriors unveiled their gold sleeved alternate uniform, featuring a white silhouette of the "Bay Bridge" logo behind a diagonal "Warriors" wordmark in blue, along with blue pinstripes on the shorts. It was followed the next season by a sleeved version of the team's white uniform. In the 2014–15 season, the design was tweaked to a slate-gray base and white letters minus the full team name on the logo. A variation of the slate gray sleeved uniform was used during Chinese New Year week, incorporating red accents; a white version was worn in the 2016–17 season. The sleeved uniforms became a hallmark of the Adidas era.

For the 2016–17 season, the Warriors wore a blue "Crossover" uniform which was inspired by the 1990s Run TMC-era uniform.

=== Nike era (2017–present) ===
The Warriors kept their primary uniforms after switching from Adidas to Nike in 2017, with the white uniform becoming the "Association" uniform and the blue uniform becoming the "Icon" uniform. From 2017 to 2019, the Warriors kept their slate gray uniforms as its "Statement" uniform, tweaking the design to reference Oakland as "The Town" by incorporating the city's oak tree logo to the uniform.

On June 12, 2019, the Warriors unveiled subtle adjustments to their primary logo, including a new custom font. Updated uniforms were released on September 17, 2019. Most notably, on the blue "Icon" uniform, the colors on the "Bay Bridge" logo were no longer inverted unlike in the previous uniform. The "Statement" uniform became gold and featured "The Bay" atop a circle with an illustration of a San Francisco Bay sunset; this was due to the team returning to San Francisco that season. In 2022, the "Statement" uniform was changed to a navy blue base and incorporated the "Golden State" wordmark in block letters. Then before the 2024–25 season, the "Statement" uniform was changed to a black base and featuring "Golden" and "State" surrounding the uniform number. A new "W" alternate logo was also released.

==== City and Earned uniforms ====
In the 2017–18 season, the Warriors wore gold "City" uniforms with "The Bay" atop a blue circle and a dragon silhouette atop the Golden Gate Bridge; this paid tribute to the Bay Area's Chinese American community. In 2018–19, the Warriors wore a variation of this "City" uniform in navy blue with gold accents.

The Warriors received an "Earned" uniform in 2018 as a reward for participating in the previous year's playoffs. Their first "Earned" uniform is a gold variation of "The Town" "Statement" uniform. After the Warriors moved to San Francisco in 2019, the dark gray "Statement" uniform was repurposed into a "City" uniform as a tribute to Oakland. This design featured a black base with gray and blue accents.

For the 2020–21 season, the Warriors wore a "City" uniform that paid tribute to the "We Believe" era in Oakland, as well as their 47 seasons there in general. It features the same coloring scheme as well as the "Oakland" location identifier in the lettering of the previous logo.

The "City" uniform for the 2021–22 season was a "mix-tape" of earlier uniforms. The black base was an homage to "The Town" uniforms which were a tribute to Oakland, the blue-trimmed gold lightning bolt stripes took cues from the 2000s Warriors uniforms, the block numbers came from their late 1980s uniforms, and the 1990s "California Outline" logo adorned the beltline. On the shorts is the team's 75th anniversary logo.

The 2022–23 "City" uniform was designed by Bay Area artist Allison Hueman, and featured a black base with a yellow illustration of a rose at the bottom. Inside a circle is a yellow-outlined rose, and outside are alternating lines said to represent sun rays. The uniform paid tribute to women at the intersection of court, community and culture.

In the 2023–24 season, the Warriors again wore a black "City" uniform, this time as a tribute to San Francisco. The "San Francisco" wordmark, numbers and embellishments paid homage to the city's iconic cable car. The Warriors reprised this "City" uniform in the 2026–27 season.

The "City" uniform used in the 2024–25 season incorporated the classic navy, yellow and red color scheme the team used in the early 1960s, as well as a nod to the Golden Gate Bridge. The design was also based on the "Statement" uniform the team unveiled that season, featuring "Golden" and "State" in metallic gold surrounding the yellow number.

For the Warriors' 2025–26 "City" uniform, they unveiled a cream version of "The Town" uniforms with brown and gold accents.

==== Classic uniforms ====
The Warriors have worn throwback versions of "The CITY" uniforms on select games since the 1990s, most recently wearing them in the 2020–21 season. They've also worn other throwback uniforms in tribute to several great moments in Warriors history, such as the 1974–75 "Cinderella" championship uniforms, the famous Sleepy Floyd game-inspired uniforms from 1987, the Run TMC uniforms from the 1990s, and in their final game in Oakland in 2019, a white uniform based on the 2007 "We Believe" era uniforms.

For the 2021–22 season, the Warriors wore a Warriors Origins jersey, which is a modernization of their 1961–62 road uniform. The 1961–62 season was their last season in Philadelphia, as well as the season in which Wilt Chamberlain scored 100 points in a single game. The jersey also commemorates the 75th anniversary of the franchise. The original jersey read "PHILA", but in order to avoid confusion with the Philadelphia 76ers (whose regular jerseys also read "PHILA"), the Warriors elected to emblazon the jersey with the team name instead, making it a fauxback jersey. The Warriors wore a white version of this jersey in the 2024–25 season.

== Rivalries ==
=== Cleveland Cavaliers ===
While the Warriors and the Cleveland Cavaliers have played each other since the Cavaliers joined the NBA in 1970, the two teams' rivalry began to develop in the 2014–15 season when they met in the first of four consecutive NBA Finals. Previously, no pair of teams had faced each other in more than two consecutive Finals. The Warriors have won three of the four NBA Finals in which they faced the Cavaliers, losing in 2016, and winning in 2015, 2017, and 2018.

=== Los Angeles Lakers ===
The Warriors and the Los Angeles Lakers both moved to California during the early 1960s. Unlike the animosity displayed in MLB's Dodgers–Giants or NFL's 49ers–Rams rivalries, the teams and fanbases generally respect each another. The teams met six times in the postseason from 1967 to 1991. The rivalry took on a new flavor after the Lakers signed LeBron James, who had faced the Warriors in four straight finals as a member of the Cavaliers. The teams have met seven times in the postseason, combining for 38 division titles since both teams moved to California in the early 1960s. The Lakers lead the all-time regular-season series 262–173, and the postseason series 25–11.

=== Sacramento Kings ===
Since the Sacramento Kings moved there in 1985, they have shared a geographic rivalry with the Warriors, as both teams are based in Northern California, with the cities of Sacramento and San Francisco located 86 miles apart from one another. However, despite the Kings joining the BAA in 1948 (when they were then known as the Royals and based in Rochester, New York), due to both teams having long periods of failing to make the playoffs, the two teams would not face each other in the postseason until 2023, where they faced off in the first round. In a bitterly fought series, including a rough play between Domantas Sabonis and Draymond Green in game 2 where Green stomped roughly on Sabonis's chest after he grabbed Green's leg (resulting in Green being suspended in game 3) and several violent viral fan scuffles throughout the series (as opposing fans were widespread at both Chase Center and Golden 1 Center due to the geographic proximity), the Warriors would defeat the Kings in seven games to advance to the semifinals. The series would draw the highest first and second round playoff TV ratings for the NBA since 1999, with game 7 peaking at 11.9 million viewers on ABC.

== Media ==
=== Television ===
Bob Fitzgerald has done television play-by-play, and former Warriors swingman Kelenna Azubuike does color commentary for the Warriors on NBC Sports Bay Area, where they telecast more than 70 Warrior games a year. Fitzgerald is in his 29th season as the Warriors' play-by-play man, as for Azubuike his 7th as the color analyst.

Former Warrior guard Jim Barnett was the TV color analyst from 1985 to 2019, and later was the color man on the radio. Now retired, the media center at Chase Center has been renamed in his honor.

=== Radio ===
Tim Roye has done the radio play-by-play for Warrior games since 1995. He is joined in the booth by former Warriors forward Tom Tolbert for home games only. He will also be joined by Jim Barnett full-time starting in 2019, who will do color analysis for both road and home games, and has already been at the booth for nationally televised and postseason matchups.

On August 25, 2016, the Warriors announced that they were leaving long-time station KNBR and that all of their games would be broadcast on KGMZ's 95.7 The Game. After each game, Roye, Fitzgerald and Barnett get together for post-game radio analysis and a next-game preview.

== Season-by-season record ==
List of the last five seasons completed by the Warriors. For the full season-by-season history, see List of Golden State Warriors seasons.

Note: GP = Games played, W = Wins, L = Losses, W–L% = Winning percentage

Season	GP	W	L	W–L%	Finish	Playoffs
2021–22	82	53	29	.646	2nd, Pacific	NBA champions, 4–2 (Celtics)
2022–23	82	44	38	.537	4th, Pacific	Lost in conference semifinals, 2–4 (Lakers)
2023–24	82	46	36	.561	5th, Pacific	Did not qualify
2024–25	82	48	34	.585	3rd, Pacific	Lost in conference semifinals, 1–4 (Timberwolves)
2025–26	82	37	45	.451	4th, Pacific	Did not qualify

== Home arenas ==
- Philadelphia Arena (1946–1962)
- Philadelphia Convention Hall (1952–1962)
- Cow Palace (1962–1964, 1966–1971, and two games in 1975 NBA Finals)
  - War Memorial Gymnasium (occasional games, 1962–1967)
- San Francisco Civic Auditorium (1964–1966)
- Oakland Coliseum Arena/The Arena in Oakland/Oracle Arena (1971–2019)
  - San Diego Sports Arena (six games in 1971–1972)
  - San Jose Arena (1996–1997 due to renovations at Oakland Arena)
- Chase Center (2019–present)

== Personnel ==
=== Current roster ===
Golden State Warriors roster
Players

Pos.	No.	Player	Height	Weight	DOB	From
F/C	28	Charles Bassey	6 ft 9 in (2.06 m)	244 lb (111 kg)	2000-10-28	Western Kentucky
F	10	Jimmy Butler III (injured)	6 ft 6 in (1.98 m)	230 lb (104 kg)	1989-09-14	Marquette
G	18	LJ Cryer (TW)	6 ft 0 in (1.83 m)	197 lb (89 kg)	2001-10-09	Houston
G	30	Stephen Curry (injured)	6 ft 2 in (1.88 m)	205 lb (93 kg)	1988-03-14	Davidson
F/C	23	Draymond Green	6 ft 6 in (1.98 m)	240 lb (109 kg)	1990-03-04	Michigan State
C	20	Al Horford	6 ft 8 in (2.03 m)	260 lb (118 kg)	1986-06-03	Florida
F/C	45	Graham Ike (TW)	6 ft 10 in (2.08 m)	257 lb (117 kg)	2002-08-03	Gonzaga
F	1	Yaxel Lendeborg	6 ft 9 in (2.06 m)	247 lb (112 kg)	2002-09-30	Michigan
F	33	Malevy Leons (TW)	6 ft 9 in (2.06 m)	206 lb (93 kg)	1999-09-23	Bradley
F	32	Georges Niang	6 ft 7 in (2.01 m)	245 lb (111 kg)	1993-06-17	Iowa State
G	8	De'Anthony Melton	6 ft 2 in (1.88 m)	199 lb (90 kg)	1998-05-28	USC
G	4	Moses Moody (injured)	6 ft 5 in (1.96 m)	217 lb (98 kg)	2002-05-31	Arkansas
G	0	Gary Payton II	6 ft 2 in (1.88 m)	192 lb (87 kg)	1992-12-01	Oregon State
G	2	Brandin Podziemski	6 ft 4 in (1.93 m)	208 lb (94 kg)	2003-02-25	Santa Clara
F/C	7	Kristaps Porziņģis (injured)	7 ft 2 in (2.18 m)	240 lb (109 kg)	1995-08-02	Latvia
G	3	Will Richard	6 ft 3 in (1.91 m)	207 lb (94 kg)	2002-12-24	Florida
F	15	Gui Santos	6 ft 7 in (2.01 m)	225 lb (102 kg)	2002-06-22	Brazil
G	12	Brandon Williams (injured)	6 ft 1 in (1.85 m)	185 lb (84 kg)	1999-11-22	Arizona

Coaches
Head coach
- Steve Kerr
Assistant(s)
- Frank Vogel (Associate HC)
- Ron Adams
- Seth Cooper
- Bruce Fraser
- Nick Kerr
- Khalid Robinson
- Jacob Rubin
- Anthony Vereen
- Kris Weems
- Drew Yoder

Legend
- (DP) Unsigned draft pick
- (FA) Free agent
- (S) Suspended
- (GL) On assignment to G League affiliate
- (TW) Two-way affiliate player
- Injured

Roster
Updated: October 17, 2026

=== Retained draft rights ===
Like all NBA teams, the Warriors retain the draft rights to players they draft but do not sign and who choose to play outside the NBA. The rights expire one year after the player's contract with the non-NBA team ends. Draft rights may also be acquired through trades with other teams. As of 2026, the Warriors retain the draft rights of:

Draft	Round	Pick	Player	Pos.	Nationality	Current team	Note(s)	Ref
2026	2	54	Lajae Jones	G/F	United States	Pallacanestro Trieste (Italy)		
2015	2	55	Cady Lalanne	C	Haiti	Free agent	Acquired from the San Antonio Spurs	

=== Retired numbers ===
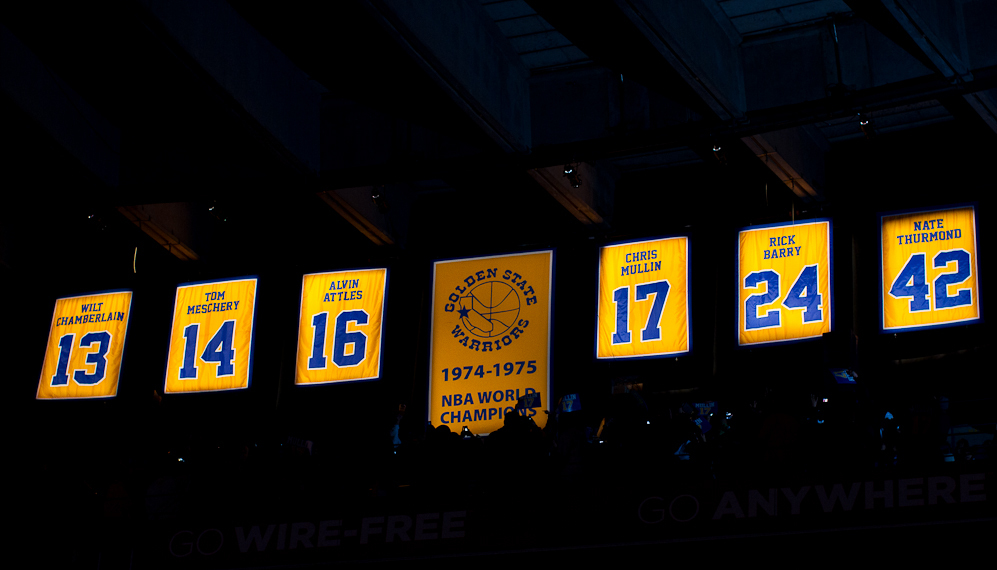
Golden State Warriors retired jerseys in 2012

Golden State Warriors retired numbers
No.	Player	Position	Tenure	Date
9	Andre Iguodala	G/F	2013–2019; 2021–2023	February 23, 2025
13	Wilt Chamberlain	C	1959–1965 ^{1}	December 29, 1999
14	Tom Meschery	F	1961–1967 ^{2}	October 13, 1967
16	Al Attles	G	1960–1971 ^{3}	February 10, 1977
17	Chris Mullin	G/F	1985–1997; 2000–2001 ^{4}	March 19, 2012
24	Rick Barry	F	1965–1967; 1972–1978	March 18, 1988
42	Nate Thurmond	C	1963–1974	March 8, 1978

Notes:

- ^{1} Includes Chamberlain's tenure (1959–1962) in Philadelphia; retired posthumously.
- ^{2} Includes Meschery's tenure (1961–1962) in Philadelphia.
- ^{3} Includes Attles' tenure (1960–1962) in Philadelphia. He also served as head coach (1969–1983).
- ^{4} Also served as general manager (2004–2009).
- Meschery, Attles, Barry, Thurmond and Mullin are also members of the Bay Area Sports Hall of Fame.
- In July 2019, the team announced their intention to retire Kevin Durant's No. 35 jersey.
- The team annouced that they will retired Klay Thompson's No. 11 jersey.
- The NBA retired Bill Russell's No. 6 for all its member teams on August 11, 2022.

=== Naismith Memorial Basketball Hall of Fame members ===
Golden State Warriors Hall of Famers
Players
No.	Name	Position	Tenure	Inducted	No.	Name	Position	Tenure	Inducted
17	Andy Phillip	G/F	1950–1953	1961	15	Tom Gola	F/G	1955–1962	1976
10	Joe Fulks	F	1946–1954	1978	11	Paul Arizin	F/G	1950–1962	1978
13	Wilt Chamberlain	C	1959–1965	1978	32; 47	Jerry Lucas ^{2}	F/C	1969–1971	1980
42	Nate Thurmond	F/C	1963–1974	1985	24	Rick Barry	F	1965–1967; 1972–1978	1987
6	Neil Johnston	C	1951–1959	1990	00	Robert Parish	C	1976–1980	2003
17	Chris Mullin ^{1}	G/F	1985–1997; 2000–2001	2011	41	Jamaal Wilkes	F	1974–1977	2012
50	Ralph Sampson	C/F	1987–1989	2012	30	Bernard King	F	1980–1982	2013
5; 25	Guy Rodgers	G	1958–1966	2014	23	Mitch Richmond	G	1988–1991	2014
13	Šarūnas Marčiulionis	G	1989–1994	2014	10	Jo Jo White	G	1979–1980	2015
4	Chris Webber	F	1993–1994; 2008	2021	5; 10	Tim Hardaway	G	1989–1996	2022
Coaches
Name		Position	Tenure	Inducted	Name		Position	Tenure	Inducted
Frank McGuire		Head coach	1961–1962	1977	Alex Hannum		Head coach	1963–1966	1998
Bill Sharman		Head coach	1966–1968	2004	Don Nelson		Head coach	1988–1995; 2006–2010	2012
Rick Adelman		Head coach	1995–1997	2021	George Karl		Head coach	1986–1988	2022
Gregg Popovich		Assistant coach	1992–1994	2023					
Contributors
Name		Position	Tenure	Inducted	Name		Position	Tenure	Inducted
Eddie Gottlieb		Founder; Owner	1946–1962	1972	Pete Newell ^{3}		Scout	1977–1984	1979
Rick Welts		Executive	2011–2024	2018	16	Al Attles	Player; Coach; Executive	1960–2024	2019
5; 18	Larry Costello	G	1954–1955; 1956–1957	2022	Jerry West		Executive	2011–2017	2024

Notes:

- ^{1} Mullin was inducted into the Hall of Fame twice, as a player and as a member of the 1992 Olympic team.
- ^{2} Lucas was inducted into the Hall of Fame twice, as a player and as a member of the 1960 Olympic team.
- ^{3} Newell was inducted into the Hall of Fame twice, as a contributor and as a member of the 1960 Olympic team.

Arizin, Fulks, Gola, Johnston and Phillip played all or most of their tenure with the Warriors in Philadelphia. Rodgers' tenure was evenly divided between Philadelphia and San Francisco, and Chamberlain's and Attles' nearly so. King (Knicks), Lucas (Knicks), Parish (Celtics), Richmond (Kings), Sampson (University of Virginia and Rockets), White (Celtics), and Wilkes (Lakers) were elected mostly for their performances with other teams. Marčiulionis played most of his NBA career with Golden State, but his induction is also for his distinguished international career (Statyba, USSR, and Lithuania). Of those elected to the hall primarily as Warriors, only Thurmond, Barry and Mullin spent significant time with the team since the 1971 move to Oakland and the name change to "Golden State".

=== FIBA Hall of Famers ===
Golden State Warriors Hall of Famers
Players
No.	Name	Position	Tenure	Inducted
13	Šarūnas Marčiulionis	G	1989–1994	2015
12	Andrew Bogut	C	2012–2016; 2019	2025

== Franchise leaders and awards ==
=== Career leaders ===
Career Leaders
Category	Player	Statistics
SP	Stephen Curry	17
GP	Stephen Curry	1,069
MP	Stephen Curry	36,304
PTS	Stephen Curry	26,528
REB	Nate Thurmond	12,771
AST	Stephen Curry	6,743
STL	Stephen Curry	1,602
BLK	Adonal Foyle	1,140
TO	Stephen Curry	3,308
PF	Paul Arizin	2,764
FG	Stephen Curry	9,022
FGA	Stephen Curry	19,155
FG%	Andris Biedriņš	.594
2P	Wilt Chamberlain	7,216
2PA	Rick Barry	14,392
2P%	Gary Payton II	.710
3P	Stephen Curry	4,248
3PA	Stephen Curry	10,073
3P%	Anthony Morrow	.460
FT	Paul Arizin	5,010
FTA	Paul Arizin	6,189
FT%	Stephen Curry	.912
Trp-Dbl	Draymond Green	33
MPG	Wilt Chamberlain	47.2
PPG	Wilt Chamberlain	41.5
RPG	Wilt Chamberlain	25.1
APG	Tim Hardaway	9.3
SPG	Rick Barry	2.3
BPG	Manute Bol	3.7

=== Season leaders ===
Season Leaders
Category	Player	Statistics
MP	Wilt Chamberlain	3,882
PTS	Wilt Chamberlain	4,029
REB	Wilt Chamberlain	2,149
AST	Sleepy Floyd	848
STL	Rick Barry	228
BLK	Manute Bol	345
TO	Latrell Sprewell	322
PF	Rudy LaRusso	337
FG	Wilt Chamberlain	1,597
FGA	Wilt Chamberlain	3,159
FG%	Chris Gatling	.633
2P	Wilt Chamberlain	1,597
2PA	Wilt Chamberlain	3,159
2P%	Chris Gatling	.634
3P	Stephen Curry	402
3PA	Stephen Curry	886
3P%	B. J. Armstrong	.473
FT	Wilt Chamberlain	835
FTA	Wilt Chamberlain	1,363
FT%	Stephen Curry	.934
Trp-Dbl	Draymond Green	13
MPG	Wilt Chamberlain	48.5
PPG	Wilt Chamberlain	50.4
RPG	Wilt Chamberlain	27.2
APG	Guy Rodgers	10.7
SPG	Rick Barry	2.9
BPG	Manute Bol	4.3

=== Individual awards ===
NBA Most Valuable Player

- Wilt Chamberlain – 1960
- Stephen Curry – 2015, 2016

NBA Finals MVP

- Rick Barry – 1975
- Andre Iguodala – 2015
- Kevin Durant – 2017, 2018
- Stephen Curry – 2022

NBA Defensive Player of the Year

- Draymond Green – 2017

NBA Rookie of the Year

- Woody Sauldsberry – 1958
- Wilt Chamberlain – 1960
- Rick Barry – 1966
- Jamaal Wilkes – 1975
- Mitch Richmond – 1989
- Chris Webber – 1994

NBA Most Improved Player

- Gilbert Arenas – 2003
- Monta Ellis – 2007

NBA Western Conference finals MVP

- Stephen Curry – 2022

NBA Clutch Player of the Year

- Stephen Curry – 2024

Twyman–Stokes Teammate of the Year

- Stephen Curry – 2025

NBA Sportsmanship Award

- Stephen Curry – 2011

NBA Hustle Award

- Draymond Green – 2025

Kareem Abdul-Jabbar Social Justice Champion

- Stephen Curry – 2023

J. Walter Kennedy Citizenship Award

- Stephen Curry – 2023

NBA Community Assist Award

- Stephen Curry – 2014
- Kevin Durant – 2018
- Gary Payton II – 2022

NBA Executive of the Year

- Dick Vertlieb – 1975
- Bob Myers – 2015, 2017

NBA Coach of the Year

- Alex Hannum – 1964
- Don Nelson – 1992
- Steve Kerr – 2016

All-NBA First Team

- Joe Fulks – 1947–1949
- Howie Dallmar – 1948
- Paul Arizin – 1952, 1956, 1957
- Neil Johnston – 1953–1956
- Wilt Chamberlain – 1960–1962, 1964
- Rick Barry – 1966, 1967, 1974–1976
- Chris Mullin – 1992
- Latrell Sprewell – 1994
- Stephen Curry – 2015, 2016, 2019, 2021
- Kevin Durant – 2018

All-NBA Second Team

- Joe Fulks – 1951
- Andy Phillip – 1952, 1953
- Jack George – 1956
- Neil Johnston – 1957
- Tom Gola – 1958
- Paul Arizin – 1959
- Wilt Chamberlain – 1963
- Rick Barry – 1973
- Phil Smith – 1976
- Bernard King – 1982
- Chris Mullin – 1989, 1991
- Tim Hardaway – 1992
- Stephen Curry – 2014, 2017, 2022, 2023, 2025
- Draymond Green – 2016
- Kevin Durant – 2017, 2019

All-NBA Third Team

- Chris Mullin – 1990
- Tim Hardaway – 1993
- David Lee – 2013
- Klay Thompson – 2015, 2016
- Draymond Green – 2017
- Stephen Curry – 2018, 2024

NBA All-Defensive First Team

- Nate Thurmond – 1969, 1971
- Andre Iguodala – 2014
- Draymond Green – 2015–2017, 2021, 2025

NBA All-Defensive Second Team

- Rudy LaRusso – 1969
- Nate Thurmond – 1972–1974
- Phil Smith – 1976
- Jamaal Wilkes – 1976, 1977
- E.C. Coleman – 1978
- Latrell Sprewell – 1994
- Andrew Bogut – 2015
- Draymond Green – 2018, 2019, 2022, 2023
- Klay Thompson – 2019

NBA All-Rookie First Team

- Nate Thurmond – 1964
- Fred Hetzel – 1966
- Rick Barry – 1966
- Jamaal Wilkes – 1975
- Gus Williams – 1976
- Joe Barry Carroll – 1981
- Larry Smith – 1981
- Mitch Richmond – 1989
- Tim Hardaway – 1990
- Billy Owens – 1992
- Chris Webber – 1994
- Joe Smith – 1996
- Marc Jackson – 2001
- Jason Richardson – 2002
- Stephen Curry – 2010
- Klay Thompson – 2012
- Harrison Barnes – 2013
- Eric Paschall – 2020
- Brandin Podziemski – 2024

NBA All-Rookie Second Team

- Latrell Sprewell – 1993
- Donyell Marshall – 1995
- Antawn Jamison – 1999

=== NBA All-Star Weekend ===
NBA All-Star selections

- Paul Arizin – 1951, 1952, 1955–1962
- Joe Fulks – 1951, 1952
- Andy Phillip – 1951, 1952
- Neil Johnston – 1953–1958
- Jack George - 1956, 1957
- Woody Sauldsberry – 1959
- Tom Gola – 1960–1962
- Wilt Chamberlain – 1960–1965
- Tom Meschery – 1963
- Guy Rodgers – 1963, 1964, 1966
- Nate Thurmond – 1965–1968, 1970, 1973, 1974
- Rick Barry – 1966, 1967, 1973–1978
- Jim King – 1968
- Clyde Lee – 1968
- Rudy LaRusso – 1968, 1969
- Jeff Mullins – 1969–1971
- Jerry Lucas – 1971
- Cazzie Russell – 1972
- Jamaal Wilkes – 1976
- Phil Smith – 1976, 1977
- Bernard King – 1982
- Sleepy Floyd – 1987
- Joe Barry Carroll – 1987
- Chris Mullin – 1989–1993
- Tim Hardaway – 1991–1993
- Latrell Sprewell – 1994, 1995, 1997
- David Lee – 2013
- Stephen Curry – 2014–2019, 2021–2026
- Klay Thompson – 2015–2019
- Draymond Green – 2016–2018, 2022
- Kevin Durant – 2017–2019
- Andrew Wiggins – 2022

NBA All-Star Game head coach

- Alex Hannum – 1965
- Bill Sharman – 1968
- Al Attles – 1975, 1976
- Don Nelson – 1992
- Steve Kerr – 2015, 2017

NBA All-Star Game MVP

- Paul Arizin – 1952
- Wilt Chamberlain – 1960
- Rick Barry – 1967
- Kevin Durant – 2019
- Stephen Curry – 2022, 2025

Skills Challenge

- Stephen Curry – 2011

Slam Dunk Contest

- Jason Richardson – 2002, 2003

Three-Point Contest

- Stephen Curry – 2015, 2021
- Klay Thompson – 2016

NBA vs. WNBA Three-Point Challenge

- Stephen Curry – 2024

== Notes ==
Preceded by Trophy established	BAA champions 1946–47	Succeeded by Baltimore Bullets
Preceded by Syracuse Nationals	NBA champions 1955–56	Succeeded by Boston Celtics
Preceded by Boston Celtics	NBA champions 1974–75	Succeeded by Boston Celtics
Preceded by San Antonio Spurs	NBA champions 2014–15	Succeeded by Cleveland Cavaliers
Preceded by Cleveland Cavaliers	NBA champions 2016–17, 2017–18	Succeeded by Toronto Raptors
Preceded by Milwaukee Bucks	NBA champions 2021–22	Succeeded by Denver Nuggets
