= Larry Riley (basketball) =

Basketball executive and sports agent

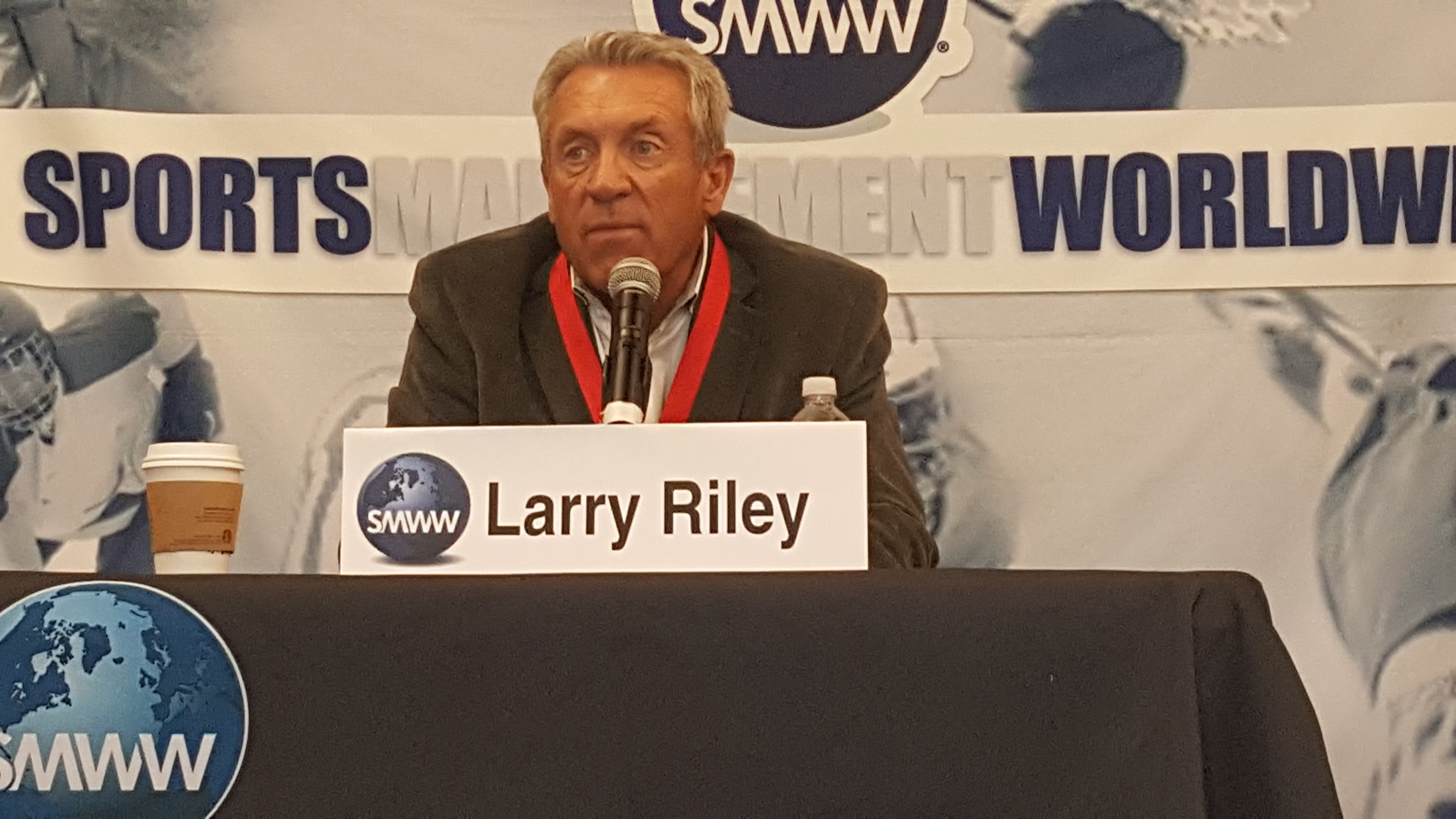
- Larry Riley speaking at the SMWW Basketball Career Conference

Atlanta Hawks
- Position: Assistant to the General manager
- League: NBA

Career information
- College: Chadron State

Larry Riley is the senior advisor to the General Manager of the Atlanta Hawks of the National Basketball Association (NBA). He was formerly the general manager for Golden State Warriors before being demoted to director of scouting after Bob Myers's promotion to GM on April 24, 2012. He was responsible for drafting Stephen Curry and Klay Thompson.

== Career ==
A graduate of Chadron State with an honors degree in education, Riley was inducted into the school's Athletic Hall of Fame in 1993. He received a master's degree in education from Southeast Missouri State. He is now also a "Basketball Player Development" instructor for the online sports-career training school Sports Management Worldwide.

Timeline

- 2009- : Atlanta Hawks, Assistant to the General Manager of the Atlanta Hawks
- 2006-2009: Golden State Warriors (Lafayette, Calif.), assistant coach/general manager
- 2000-2006: Dallas Mavericks (Fort Worth, Texas), assistant coach/scout
- 1994-2000: Vancouver Grizzlies (Vancouver), director of player personnel/scout
- 1988-94: Milwaukee Bucks (Milwaukee), assistant coach/scout
- 1978-88: Eastern New Mexico (Portales, N.M.), head coach
- 1976-78: Chadron State (Chadron, Neb.), head coach
- 1974-76: Mercer (Macon), assistant coach
- 1973-74: Brevard Community College (Cocoa Beach, FL.), assistant coach
- 1970-73: Wisconsin-Milwaukee (Wisconsin), assistant coach
- 1969-70: Southeast Missouri State (Cape Girardeau Mo.), assistant coach
