= Joe Lacob =

American business executive (born 1956)

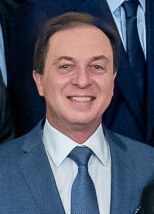
- Lacob in 2023

Golden State Warriors
- Positions: Principal Owner, Co-Executive Chairman, and CEO
- League: NBA

Personal information
- Born: January 10, 1956 (age 70) New Bedford, Massachusetts, U.S.

Career information
- College: University of California, Irvine (BS); University of California, Los Angeles (MS); Stanford University (MBA)

Career highlights
- 5× NBA champion (2008, 2015, 2017, 2018, 2022); 1x WNBA Champion (2026)

Joseph Steven Lacob (born January 10, 1956) is an American business executive who was a partner at Kleiner Perkins and is the principal owner of the Golden State Warriors of the National Basketball Association (NBA) and the Golden State Valkyries of the Women's National Basketball Association (WNBA).

== Early life and education ==
Lacob grew up in a working-class Jewish family in New Bedford, Massachusetts. His father, Sidney, worked at a paper plant and his mother, Marlene, worked nights as a cashier at a supermarket. When Lacob was 13, the family relocated to Anaheim, California, and Joe switched his allegiance to the Los Angeles Lakers and the Los Angeles Angels.

Lacob earned a bachelor's degree in biological sciences from University of California, Irvine, in 1978, master's degree in public health (epidemiology) from University of California, Los Angeles (UCLA) and an MBA from the Stanford Graduate School of Business.

== Professional career ==
Lacob has been a partner at Kleiner Perkins, a venture capital investing firm, since 1987. His investments have centered around firms involved in life sciences, medical technology, Internet and energy, and such enterprises as AutoTrader.com, Align Technology and NuVasive. Before he joined Kleiner Perkins, Lacob held executive positions with Cetus Corporation (now Chiron), FHP International (a health maintenance organization) and the management-consulting firm of Booz, Allen & Hamilton. In interviews, he has credited his epidemiology degree for giving him a background in statistics that has fed the statistical side of his longstanding sports interest.

He was a primary investor in the American Basketball League, a professional women's basketball league that eventually folded from failure to compete successfully with its rival, the Women's National Basketball Association (WNBA). In January 2006, he became part-owner of the Boston Celtics, where he became a co-investor with H. Irving Grousbeck, an entrepreneur and a professor at the Stanford Graduate School of Business.

On July 15, 2010, Lacob and the group of investors he headed agreed to buy the Golden State Warriors of the NBA from Chris Cohan for $450 million, requiring him to sell his minority interest in the Celtics. The Lacob - Peter Guber group won out over a dozen other bidders for the Warriors, including Oracle chief executive officer Larry Ellison, 24-Hour Fitness founder Mark Mastrov and Texas billionaire financier David Bonderman. He had been a Warriors' season-ticket-holder for about a decade. He already had extensive experience operating an NBA team as part-owner of the Celtics, and also points to his friendships with two major league baseball team general managers, Billy Beane of the Oakland Athletics and Jeff Moorad of the San Diego Padres, who have both proven that winning records are not solely related to the size of the team payroll. Lacob approved the acquisitions of David Lee and undrafted rookie guard Jeremy Lin, a hometown favorite. He also fired coach Don Nelson and replaced him with assistant coach Keith Smart. The sale was unanimously approved by the NBA league's board of governors on November 12, 2010. Lacob and Peter Guber are the chief owners, but Lacob is in charge of day-to-day operations.

Before the 2014-15 NBA season, Lacob fired coach Mark Jackson who had just led the Warriors to the playoffs in consecutive seasons. Lacob explained the decision at a conference of fellow venture capitalists: "Part of it was, he couldn't get along with anybody else in the organization. And, look, he did a great job -- and I'll always compliment him in many respects -- but you can't have 200 other people in the organization not like you."

Lacob generated some controversy by calling his team "light years" ahead of everybody else in the NBA during the 2015–16 NBA season. The Warriors won championships in the 2014–15 NBA season, 2016–17 NBA season, 2017–18 NBA season, and the 2021–22 NBA season. During his tenure with the Warriors, the team has attained the NBA records for the best regular season with 73–9 and most wins in a season (regular season and postseason combined) with 88 in 2015–16, as well as best postseason with 16–1 (.941 winning percentage) in 2016–17.

In October 2023, the WNBA announced that the Warriors ownership group had been selected to lead the league's first expansion team since 2008, the Golden State Valkyries, with a record setting expansion fee of $50 million. The owners approved heavy investments into the team before their inaugural season, including a $1.5 million renovation of the old Warriors practice facility in Oakland into a dedicated performance center for the Valkyries, and a new campus and locker room at the Chase Center arena. Lacob created a bold vision for the team, publicly stating, "we will win a WNBA championship in the first five years of this franchise." The Valkyries have found both on and off-court success in their first two years, making back-to-back playoff appearances, selling out all home games, and becoming the first WNBA franchise to reach a $1 billion valuation. On October 31, the Valkyries won their first WNBA championship, defeating the Atlanta Dream in seven games.

As of 2026, Joe Lacob's net worth is $2.3 billion, according to Forbes.

== Personal life ==
Lacob married his first wife, Laurie (née Krauss), after meeting her in college. They had four children together, Kirk, Kelly, Kent, and Kayci. They filed for divorce in 2006, which was finalized in 2009. Laurie died of cancer in 2023.

He is currently married to Nicole Curran, whom he met at a golf tournament in 2006. They got engaged in 2009.

His daughter Kelly lives in San Francisco, with her younger sister, Kayci, the writer-director-producer of the semi-autobiographical Everything to Me, which had the original title of The Book of Jobs.

Sporting positions
Preceded by Chris Cohan	Golden State Warriors principal owner 2010–present Served alongside: Peter Guber	Incumbent
New creation	Golden State Valkyries principal owner 2025–present Served alongside: Peter Guber	Incumbent
