= Chris Cohan =

American entrepreneur

- Born: John Christopher Cohan; January 2, 1950 (age 76); Hanford, California, U.S.
- Education: Los Gatos High School
- Alma mater: Arizona State University
- Occupations: Businessman, entrepreneur
- Employer: NBA (formerly)
- Known for: Founder of Sonic Communications; Former owner of the Golden State Warriors

John Christopher Cohan (born January 2, 1950) is an American entrepreneur who was founder of Sonic Communications and was owner of the Golden State Warriors of the NBA.

== Early life and education ==
Cohan was born in 1950 in Hanford, California, the only child of John and Helen Cohan, who divorced when he was seven. John Cohan was originally from Texas and created businesses in Salinas, California, including a restaurant and later the television station KSBW. After his parents' divorce, Chris Cohan lived in Salinas with his mother and moved to Los Gatos, California as a teenager, where he graduated in 1968 from Los Gatos High School. Cohan attended Arizona State University, where he graduated with a bachelor's degree in recreation; in two news stories in 1994, Cohan incorrectly claimed to have studied business at Arizona State.

== Career ==
In 1977, Cohan founded Sonic Communications, which became one of the largest independently owned cable outlets in the country before he sold it in May 1998.

He assumed control of the Golden State Warriors in October 1994 prior to the 1994-95 season for a reported fee totaling at $130 million and helped renovate the Oakland Coliseum Arena (later known as The Arena in Oakland and Oracle Arena, and now called Oakland Arena). Under Cohan's ownership, however, the team experienced only two winning seasons and one playoff appearance in 16 seasons. As of 2005, Cohan's net worth was around $325 million.

In May 2007, Cohan was reportedly fighting a $160 million tax-evasion charge in federal court in the aftermath of his 1998 sale of Sonic Communications for more than $200 million.

In May 2009, Sports Illustrated listed the top ten best and worst owners of basketball teams, ranking Cohan as fourth worst. SI criticized Cohan for sticking with coach Don Nelson as part of the Warriors' generally poor performance apart from their 2007 playoff first-round upset of the top-seeded Dallas Mavericks, and pointed out that Golden State was repeatedly rebuilding without much success.

In the wake of such criticism and controversy, he finally sold the Warriors to Peter Guber and Joe Lacob for $450 million in July 2010.

Cohan has homes in San Francisco, California and East Hampton, New York.

Sporting positions
Preceded by Jim Fitzgerald	Golden State Warriors principal owner 1995–2010	Succeeded by Peter Guber; Joe Lacob
