= Scooter Barry =

American basketball player (born 1966)

Personal information
- Born: August 13, 1966 (age 60) San Francisco, California, U.S.
- Listed height: 6 ft 3 in (1.91 m)

Career information
- High school: De La Salle (Concord, California)
- College: Kansas (1985–1989)
- NBA draft: 1989: undrafted
- Playing career: 1989–2006
- Position: Guard

Career history
- 1989–1990: San Jose Jammers
- 1990: Erie Wave
- 1990: Nashville Stars
- 1990–1991: San Jose Jammers
- 1991–1992: SG Braunschweig
- 1992: Tau Cerámica
- 1992: Wichita Falls Texans
- 1993–1994: Fort Wayne Fury
- 1994–1995: Yakima Sun Kings
- 1995: South East Melbourne Magic
- 1995–1996: Hertener Löwen
- 1996–1998: SG Braunschweig
- 1998–2000: Gießen 46ers
- 2000–2001: Media Broker Messina
- 2001: FC Mulhouse Basket
- 2001–2003: Cholet Basket
- 2003–2004: Spirou Charleroi
- 2004–2005: Tenerife
- 2005–2006: Baloncesto León

Career highlights
- Belgian League champion (2004); CBA champion (1995); NCAA champion (1988)

Richard Francis "Scooter" Barry IV (born August 13, 1966) is an American former professional basketball player.

His nickname "Scooter" was given to him shortly after he was born in San Francisco. The son of NBA Hall of Fame member Rick Barry, he has three younger brothers Jon, Brent and Drew, who also share his profession. He has a sister, Shannon. The basketball Barry family shares an NCAA Championship, an NBA Slam Dunk Championship and three NBA Championship titles between them. He has a half brother, Canyon Barry, who played at the College of Charleston in Charleston, South Carolina (then for University of Florida in Gainesville as a graduate transfer) and professionally in the NBA G-League for the Iowa Wolves. Canyon's mother, Lynn Barry, was also a distinguished basketball player at William & Mary in Williamsburg, Virginia.

Barry played college basketball at Kansas in Lawrence and was a junior on the 1987–88 Jayhawks team which won the NCAA title. He played a vital part in the team's championship run, scoring a career-high 15 points in the Jayhawks' 71–58 win over Kansas State, sending them to the Final Four. He then played for 17 years professionally in the United States and overseas in Germany, Spain, Italy, France, Belgium, and Australia. He won a CBA title in 1995, a Belgian League title in 2004 and reached the NBL finals in 1995.

Barry has two children from his first marriage, Lauren (2003) and Grant (2006). As of March 2020, he is married to Ruby Palmore, and they live in the Bay Area.
