= Drew Barry =

American basketball player (born 1973)

Personal information
- Born: February 17, 1973 (age 53) Oakland, California, U.S.
- Listed height: 6 ft 5 in (1.96 m)
- Listed weight: 191 lb (87 kg)

Career information
- High school: De La Salle (Concord, California)
- College: Georgia Tech (1992–1996)
- NBA draft: 1996: 2nd round, 57th overall pick
- Drafted by: Seattle SuperSonics
- Playing career: 1996–2003
- Position: Shooting guard
- Number: 11, 12, 2, 10

Career history
- 1996–1997: Fort Wayne Fury
- 1998: Atlanta Hawks
- 1999: Seattle SuperSonics
- 1999: Sydney Kings
- 1999–2000: Golden State Warriors
- 2000: Atlanta Hawks
- 2001: Metis Varese
- 2002: Celana Bergamo
- 2002–2003: Prokom Trefl

Career highlights
- Second-team All-ACC (1996)

Career NBA statistics
- Points: 134 (2.2 ppg)
- Rebounds: 67 (1.1 rpg)
- Assists: 111 (1.9 apg)
- Stats at NBA.com
- Stats at Basketball Reference

Drew William Barry (born February 17, 1973) is an American former professional basketball player.

== Early life ==
Born in Oakland, California, he is the son of Basketball Hall of Famer Rick Barry and Pamela Hale, the daughter of Bruce Hale who played in the NBA and was Rick's college coach at Miami of Florida. Drew has three brothers: Scooter, Jon, and Brent, who are also basketball players. In 1979, Rick left the family and divorced Pamela the following year. She married Bill Connolly, Drew's stepfather, in 1987. Rick later married Lynn Barry and they had a son, Canyon Barry, who was also a basketball player.

== Playing career ==
Barry graduated from De La Salle High School in Concord in 1991 and played four seasons with the Yellow Jackets basketball team at the Georgia Institute of Technology (Georgia Tech) after redshirting his freshman year. The all-time assists leader of Georgia Tech, Barry played briefly for the Fort Wayne Fury in the CBA and in the NBA for the Atlanta Hawks, Seattle SuperSonics, and Golden State Warriors.

Prior to being signed by the Hawks on March 27, 2000, Barry played eight games with the Sydney Kings during the 1999–2000 NBL season. In his eight games for the Kings, Barry averaged 7.6 points, 4.0 rebounds, 6.3 assists and 1 steal per game. His best game was on November 13, 2000, in a 99–86 loss against the Cairns Taipans where he recorded 20 points, 8 rebounds, 9 assists, 1 steal and 1 block. He also played professionally in Poland.

== Career statistics ==
Legend
GP	Games played	GS	Games started	MPG	Minutes per game
FG%	Field goal percentage	3P%	3-point field goal percentage	FT%	Free throw percentage
RPG	Rebounds per game	APG	Assists per game	SPG	Steals per game
BPG	Blocks per game	PPG	Points per game	**Bold**	Career high

=== Regular season ===
Year	Team	GP	GS	MPG	FG%	3P%	FT%	RPG	APG	SPG	BPG	PPG
1997–98	Atlanta	**27**	0	9.5	.474	.429	.846	**1.3**	1.8	**.4**	.0	2.1
1998–99	Seattle	17	0	**10.8**	.313	.333	.692	1.2	1.7	**.4**	**.1**	2.2
1999–2000	Golden State	8	0	10.6	**.500**	.333	.500	1.0	**2.1**	.3	.0	**2.8**
1999–2000	Atlanta	8	0	9.3	.400	**.444**	**1.000**	.5	2.0	.0	.0	2.4
Career		60	0	10.0	.417	.381	.774	1.1	1.9	.3	.0	2.2

=== Playoffs ===
Year	Team	GP	GS	MPG	FG%	3P%	FT%	RPG	APG	SPG	BPG	PPG
1998	Atlanta	2	0	2.5	.000	.000	—	.5	.0	.0	.0	.0
Career		2	0	2.5	.000	.000	—	.5	.0	.0	.0	.0

== See also ==
- List of second-generation NBA players
