= Brent Barry =

American basketball player (born 1971)

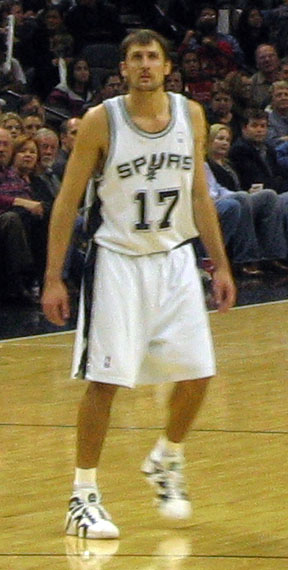
- Barry with the San Antonio Spurs in 2005

Personal information
- Born: December 31, 1971 (age 54) Hempstead, New York, U.S.
- Listed height: 6 ft 7 in (2.01 m)
- Listed weight: 210 lb (95 kg)

Career information
- High school: De La Salle (Concord, California)
- College: Oregon State (1991–1995)
- NBA draft: 1995: 1st round, 15th overall pick
- Drafted by: Denver Nuggets
- Playing career: 1995–2009
- Position: Shooting guard
- Number: 31, 17
- Coaching career: 2024–present

Career history

Playing
- 1995–1998: Los Angeles Clippers
- 1998: Miami Heat
- 1999: Chicago Bulls
- 1999–2004: Seattle SuperSonics
- 2004–2008: San Antonio Spurs
- 2008–2009: Houston Rockets

Career highlights
- 2× NBA champion (2005, 2007); NBA All-Rookie Second Team (1996); NBA Slam Dunk Contest champion (1996); First-team All-Pac-10 (1995)

Career statistics
- Points: 8,488 (9.3 ppg)
- Rebounds: 2,780 (3.0 rpg)
- Assists: 2,892 (3.2 apg)
- Stats at NBA.com
- Stats at Basketball Reference

Brent Robert Barry (born December 31, 1971), nicknamed "Bones", is an American professional basketball coach, executive, broadcaster and former player. He is a game analyst for Amazon Prime's coverage of the National Basketball Association (NBA). The shooting guard played professionally in the NBA, winning two league championships with the Spurs in 2005 and 2007, and also won the Slam Dunk Contest in 1996. He is the son of Basketball Hall of Famer Rick Barry.

After retiring, Barry worked as a sports commentator for the NBA on TNT and was a studio host for the NBA TV show NBA Gametime. In 2018, he returned to the Spurs as an executive. In 2024, he joined the Phoenix Suns as an assistant coach. He is also a commentator of the NBA 2K series and has been a commentator since the release of NBA 2K21.

== Early life ==
Barry was born on December 31, 1971, in Hempstead, New York. He is the son of Hall of Famer Rick Barry. He attended De La Salle High School in Concord, California.

== College career ==
Barry played four years on the Beavers basketball team of Oregon State University after redshirting his freshman season. Barry graduated from Oregon State with a Bachelor of Arts degree in sociology in 1995.

== Professional career ==
Brent Barry was selected by the Denver Nuggets in the first round (15th pick) of the 1995 NBA draft, but was traded to the Los Angeles Clippers on draft night in a four-player trade with Rodney Rogers for the second overall pick in the draft (Antonio McDyess) and Randy Woods. Barry was generally considered a good passer and had three seasons where he averaged more than five assists per game. Barry was also a strong three-point shooter and shot 40% from the three-point line. These two strengths, combined with Barry's 6 ft 7 in (2.01 m) frame, allowed him to play a variety of positions, including point guard, shooting guard, and small forward; because he was taller than most traditional point guards, he was often considered a point forward when he was running the offense. He was on the San Antonio Spurs championship teams in 2005 and 2007. He won the Slam Dunk Contest in the NBA All-Star Weekend in 1996 with a Julius Erving-inspired slam dunk in which he took off from the free throw line to sail in and dunk one-handed. He was the first white player to win the competition.

=== Los Angeles Clippers (1995–1998) ===
After being drafted by the Denver Nuggets, Barry was traded immediately to the Los Angeles Clippers. In his rookie season, Brent made 123 3-pointers, which broke the current rookie record. There, Barry would average 10.4 points and 38% on three-point field goals in 179 games. In his second season, he and the Clippers attempted a playoff run where Barry would average 11.7 points, his highest in the postseason. The Clippers only played in three games (one series; 1996–97) during the postseason while Barry was there.

=== Miami Heat (1998) ===
Barry was traded to the Miami Heat the day before the February 20 trade deadline from Los Angeles for Isaac Austin. In Miami, Barry would only play 17 games, not starting any of them, averaging only 4.1 points.

=== Chicago Bulls (1999) ===
Barry signed with the Bulls on January 25, 1999, and signed a 6-year $27 million contract. After sustaining an injury, he played only 37 of the 50 games played that season, starting 30 of those games, averaging 11.1 points. Failing to fill the void of a Jordan-less Bulls, the team traded Brent for Hersey Hawkins and James Cotton from Seattle on August 12, 1999.

=== Seattle SuperSonics (1999–2004) ===
Brent spent five seasons with the Seattle SuperSonics. Brent would begin his Seattle career as a back-up for fellow Oregon State alumnus Gary Payton. He eventually moved to play the point position as a starter, and filled in when needed as a small forward. There he averaged 11.2 points, made 669 three-point shots, and started the majority of his NBA career (296 out of 328 games), and totaled 4,107 points. In Seattle he played 10 postseason games, starting eight of those, the most in his career up to that point.

=== San Antonio Spurs (2004–2008) ===
In the summer of 2004, Barry was signed as a free agent by the San Antonio Spurs, where he spent most of the season as a backup. After losing their first playoff game to the Denver Nuggets in the 2005 NBA playoffs, San Antonio inserted Barry into the starting lineup. The Spurs' new lineup helped them beat the Nuggets in the series four games to one. Later in those same playoffs, Barry earned his first championship ring when the Spurs defeated the Detroit Pistons in the 2005 NBA Finals. Brent and his father, Rick Barry, are the second father-son duo to each win an NBA championship as a player; the first was Matt Guokas, Sr. and his son Matt Guokas, Jr. The only other father-son duos are Bill Walton and his son Luke Walton, Mychal Thompson and his son Klay Thompson, and Gary Payton and his son Gary Payton II.

In June 2007, he won his second NBA championship ring when the Spurs swept the Cleveland Cavaliers 4–0.

In January 2008, Barry tore his right calf muscle. On February 20, 2008, (not too long after his injury) Barry, along with Francisco Elson and a 2009 first-round draft pick, were traded by the San Antonio Spurs back to the Seattle SuperSonics in exchange for forward/center Kurt Thomas. Barry was waived the following day by the Sonics. After a mandatory 30-day waiting period, he re-signed with San Antonio on March 24, 2008, for one year with the possibility for the 2009–2010 season at Veteran Minimum.

Coming off of injury Barry did not see very much playing time in the first two rounds of the 2008 NBA playoffs. Barry would shine against the Lakers in the Western Conference finals, however, getting 23 points in Game 4, with a controversial no-call foul with 2 seconds on the clock. The Spurs would lose the series in 5 games, however.

San Antonio provided Barry with the most playoff experience (71 games) of his career. He totaled 356 3-point shots made and 1,888 points.

=== Houston Rockets (2008–2009) ===
Barry opted out of his contract and became a free agent on July 1, 2008. On July 10, Barry signed a 2-year contract with the Houston Rockets, becoming the third member of the family to join the franchise. His father, Rick, ended his career playing two seasons with the Rockets (1978–1980) and his older brother, Jon, also finished his career with the Rockets, playing from 2004 to 06. Financial terms were not released.

Brent's other brother Richard Francis "Scooter" Barry IV (born August 13, 1966) is also a retired American professional basketball player.

On October 23, 2009, Brent Barry's career ended when he was cut by the Rockets at the end of training camp, leading Barry to later remark that "all the Barrys were buried in Houston".

== Post-playing career ==
In 2013, Barry began making regular appearances on NBA TV's The Starters in his own segment: "The Bone Zone". He was a fill-in analyst for the NBA on TNT coverage, and was a play-by-play announcer for their Players Only broadcast starting in 2016. He was partnered with Ian Eagle for TNT's coverage of the 2018 NBA playoffs.

In 2018, Barry joined the San Antonio Spurs' front office as their vice president of basketball operations.

In August 2024, Barry was hired as an assistant coach for the Phoenix Suns.

In 2025, Barry joined Amazon Prime's announcing team for its coverage of NBA games.

== Personal life ==
Barry, born in Hempstead, New York, is the son of Hall of Famer Rick Barry, and was arguably the best player of the five basketball-playing Barry sons, the others being Scooter, Jon, Drew, and Canyon. His stepmother, Lynn Barry, also was an accomplished basketball player in college. Brent, the second youngest, played his high school basketball at athletic powerhouse De La Salle High School in Concord, California, and graduated in 1990.

Brent and Erin Benavides-Barry were married in 1998, after being together from the time they were both in high school. They have two sons. In 2010, Brent Barry filed for divorce, citing "irreconcilable differences" after his wife reportedly engaged in an emotional affair with his Spurs teammate Tony Parker. Erin was found dead of a self-inflicted gunshot wound on October 14, 2026. Her death was ruled a suicide.

== NBA career statistics ==
Legend
| GP | Games played | GS | Games started | MPG | Minutes per game |
| FG% | Field goal percentage | 3P% | 3-point field goal percentage | FT% | Free throw percentage |
| RPG | Rebounds per game | APG | Assists per game | SPG | Steals per game |
| BPG | Blocks per game | PPG | Points per game | **Bold** | Career high |
| † | Won an NBA championship | * | Led the league |

=== Regular season ===
| Year | Team | GP | GS | MPG | FG% | 3P% | FT% | RPG | APG | SPG | BPG | PPG |
|---|---|---|---|---|---|---|---|---|---|---|---|---|
| 1995–96 | L.A. Clippers | 79 | 44 | 24.0 | .474 | .416 | .810 | 2.1 | 2.9 | 1.2 | .3 | 10.1 |
| 1996–97 | L.A. Clippers | 59 | 0 | 18.5 | .409 | .324 | .817 | 1.9 | 2.6 | .9 | .3 | 7.5 |
| 1997–98 | L.A. Clippers | 41 | 36 | 32.7 | .428 | .400 | .844 | 3.5 | 3.2 | 1.2 | **.6** | 13.7 |
| 1997–98 | Miami | 17 | 0 | 15.2 | .371 | .353 | **1.000** | 1.6 | 1.2 | .8 | .2 | 4.1 |
| 1998–99 | Chicago | 37 | 30 | 31.9 | .396 | .302 | .772 | 3.9 | 3.1 | 1.1 | .3 | 11.1 |
| 1999–00 | Seattle | 80 | 74 | 34.1 | .463 | .411 | .809 | 4.7 | 3.6 | 1.3 | .4 | 11.8 |
| 2000–01 | Seattle | 67 | 20 | 26.5 | .494 | **.476*** | .816 | 3.1 | 3.4 | 1.2 | .2 | 8.8 |
| 2001–02 | Seattle | **81** | **81** | **37.5** | **.508** | .424 | .846 | **5.4** | 5.3 | **1.8** | .5 | **14.4** |
| 2002–03 | Seattle | 75 | 68 | 33.1 | .458 | .403 | .795 | 4.0 | 5.1 | 1.5 | .2 | 10.3 |
| 2003–04 | Seattle | 59 | 53 | 30.6 | .504 | .452 | .827 | 3.5 | **5.8** | 1.4 | .3 | 10.8 |
| 2004–05† | San Antonio | **81** | 8 | 21.5 | .423 | .357 | .837 | 2.3 | 2.2 | .5 | .2 | 7.4 |
| 2005–06 | San Antonio | 74 | 5 | 17.0 | .452 | .396 | .661 | 2.1 | 1.7 | .5 | .4 | 5.8 |
| 2006–07† | San Antonio | 75 | 28 | 21.7 | .475 | .446 | .880 | 2.1 | 1.8 | .7 | .2 | 8.5 |
| 2007–08 | San Antonio | 31 | 1 | 17.9 | .481 | .429 | .950 | 1.8 | 1.7 | .5 | .1 | 7.1 |
| 2008–09 | Houston | 56 | 1 | 15.3 | .407 | .374 | .950 | 1.7 | 1.4 | .4 | .1 | 3.7 |
| Career | | 912 | 449 | 25.9 | .460 | .405 | .823 | 3.0 | 3.2 | 1.0 | .3 | 9.3 |

=== Playoffs ===
| Year | Team | GP | GS | MPG | FG% | 3P% | FT% | RPG | APG | SPG | BPG | PPG |
|---|---|---|---|---|---|---|---|---|---|---|---|---|
| 1997 | L.A. Clippers | 3 | 0 | 28.0 | .407 | .455 | .889 | 2.3 | **3.3** | **1.3** | .0 | **11.7** |
| 2000 | Seattle | 5 | 3 | **31.0** | .364 | .400 | .714 | 2.6 | 3.0 | .6 | .6 | 8.4 |
| 2002 | Seattle | 5 | 5 | 29.8 | .412 | .438 | **1.000** | **4.6** | 2.8 | .6 | **.8** | 7.8 |
| 2005† | San Antonio | **23** | **8** | 24.1 | .457 | .424 | .810 | 2.4 | 1.9 | .7 | .2 | 6.1 |
| 2006 | San Antonio | 13 | 2 | 23.2 | **.557** | **.500** | .762 | 2.5 | 1.7 | .7 | .2 | 7.8 |
| 2007† | San Antonio | 19 | 0 | 11.8 | .350 | .306 | **1.000** | 1.3 | 1.1 | .2 | .1 | 3.1 |
| 2008 | San Antonio | 16 | 0 | 14.2 | .491 | .463 | .800 | 1.1 | 1.1 | .4 | .1 | 5.2 |
| 2009 | Houston | 4 | 0 | 8.8 | .500 | .375 | — | 1.0 | .8 | .5 | .0 | 3.3 |
| Career | | 88 | 18 | 19.7 | .446 | .416 | .802 | 2.0 | 1.7 | .5 | .2 | 5.8 |

== See also ==
- List of NBA career 3-point field goal percentage leaders
- List of second-generation NBA players
