= Looie =

Looie may refer to:

- Lou Carnesecca (1925–2024), American college basketball coach
- Lieutenant, in military slang
