= Lynn Norenberg Barry =

American basketball player

Personal information
- Born: 1959 (age 66–67) St. Petersburg, Florida, U.S.
- Listed height: 5 ft 8 in (1.73 m)

Career information
- High school: Lakewood (St. Petersburg, Florida)
- College: William & Mary (1977–1981)
- Position: Guard

Career history

Coaching
- 1981–1983: Kentucky (assistant)

Career highlights
- Piedmont Conference Player of the Year (1978); 3× VAIAW All-State Team; No. 22 retired by William & Mary Tribe

Lynn A. Barry (née Norenberg) (born 1959) is an American former assistant executive director of USA women's basketball and former adviser to the Women's National Basketball Association. Barry is also considered to be the most talented player in the College of William & Mary's women's basketball program history.

== Personal life ==
Born in St. Petersburg, Florida, Norenberg attended her hometown's Lakewood High School where she graduated in 1977 and excelled in basketball, tennis, track and softball. She was named the Amateur Athlete of the Year in 1977 by the St. Petersburg Evening Independent and was inducted into the Lakewood High School Hall of Fame in 2008. She currently resides in Colorado Springs, Colorado and is married to Basketball Hall of Famer Rick Barry. They have one son together, Canyon (Rick has four sons — Jon, Brent, Scooter and Drew — and one daughter, Shannon, by his first wife). Canyon was a member of the 2024 USA Olympic Team in 3x3 Basketball.

== College career ==
Lynn Barry (then Norenberg) attended the College of William & Mary in Williamsburg, Virginia from 1977-1981. By the time she graduated, she had become the most decorated player in school history after having established 11 school records (six of which still stand). Lynn was a four-year starter and co-captain. She was named the conference Player of the Year as a freshman and led the team to the VAIAW state championship during her sophomore campaign, and for her career she scored exactly 1,500 points in only 82 games played. On February 17, 2002, Barry became the only women's athlete in William & Mary history, regardless of sport, to have her jersey number retired (#22).

=== Academic success ===
Aside from being the top player in program history, Barry was also recognized for her academic success. She was inducted into the Verizon Academic All-America Hall of Fame in 2001 after having graduated with a 3.97 GPA, with a major in Kinesiology. Her grades earned her two Academic All-American honors while at the College as well as an induction into the prestigious Phi Beta Kappa Honor Society. Barry graduated 7th in her class of 869. She also received the prestigious James Frederick Carr Cup, presented to one graduating senior, for excellence in character, leadership, scholarship and service.

=== Multi-sport star ===
Barry also lettered in track and field and was the Virginia discus champion in 1977.

Other accomplishments during, or because of, Barry's athletic achievements include:

- Inducted into the William & Mary Athletics Hall of Fame (1991)
- Piedmont Conference Player of the Year (1978)
- Three-time VAIAW All-State Team
- Three-time VAIAW State All-Tournament Team

== Post-college ==
After graduating from William & Mary in 1981, Barry went on to earn a master's degree from Kentucky with a 4.0 GPA. While a graduate student, she was an assistant coach for the Kentucky Wildcats women's basketball team from 1981 to 1983 under head coach Terry Hall.

Barry eventually worked as an enforcement representative for the NCAA and was the only woman on a 10-person staff of field investigators. She then worked as the assistant executive director of USA Basketball for eleven years (1985–1996) where she organized all women's basketball teams for participation in events such as the Olympics, World Championships and Pan-American Games. She was named the Women's Basketball Coaches Association (WBCA) Executive of the Year in 1994. After the women's national team won the gold medal at the 1996 Olympics in Atlanta, Barry left USA Basketball to become a special advisor to the WNBA. She worked at this position for five years, but is now a guest speaker at youth basketball camps in and around her home of Colorado Springs.
