= Sonny Dove =

American basketball player (1945–1983)

Personal information
- Born: August 16, 1945 Hyannis, Massachusetts, U.S.
- Died: February 14, 1983 (aged 37) Brooklyn, New York, U.S.
- Listed height: 6 ft 7 in (2.01 m)
- Listed weight: 198 lb (90 kg)

Career information
- High school: St. Francis Preparatory (Brooklyn, New York)
- College: St. John's (1964–1967)
- NBA draft: 1967: 1st round, 4th overall pick
- Drafted by: Detroit Pistons
- Playing career: 1967–1978
- Position: Small forward
- Number: 44, 11

Career history
- 1967–1969: Detroit Pistons
- 1969: Scranton Miners
- 1969–1972: New York Nets
- 1972–1973: Allentown Jets
- 1977–1978: Brooklyn Dodgers

Career highlights
- Consensus second-team All-American (1967); Haggerty Award winner (1967)

Career NBA/ABA statistics
- Points: 2,458 (11.1 ppg)
- Rebounds: 1,334 (6.0 rpg)
- Assists: 219 (1.0 apg)
- Stats at NBA.com
- Stats at Basketball Reference
Medals
Representing United States
Men's basketball
Pan American Games
Gold medal – first place	1967 Winnipeg	Team Competition

Lloyd "Sonny" Dove (August 16, 1945 – February 14, 1983) was an American professional basketball player. As a star at St. John's University in New York, in his last season of 1967, Dove won the Haggerty Award. That year he was part of the United States basketball team that won the gold medal at the Pan American Games in Winnipeg.

His record has continued to make him one of the top players ever at St. John's. In 2005 Dove was among the first ten men selected for "Basketball Legacy Honors" at the university. In 2011 Dove was inducted into the New York City Basketball Hall of Fame.

== Early life and education ==
Lloyd Leslie Dove Jr. was born at Cape Cod Hospital in Hyannis, Massachusetts in 1945 and nicknamed "Sonny." His father was Lloyd Dove, an African-American from New Bern, North Carolina. Sonny's mother Adeline B. Dove (1921–2010) was Mashpee Wampanoag and the sister of Earl Mills Sr. (Flying Eagle), who for many after 1956 the sachem of this people. The Mills were one of the families to have often held this post. He has a brother and sister. By Wampanoag matrilineal tradition, the children are considered to belong to the mother's clan.

The Doves divorced and the father moved to New York City where Sonny would ultimately move. In 1951 Adeline Dove remarried and had four more children.

Dove graduated from St. Francis Preparatory School in Brooklyn, where his skill at basketball was noted. He was recruited for St. John's University by Lou Carnesecca, the assistant basketball coach at the time.

== College career ==
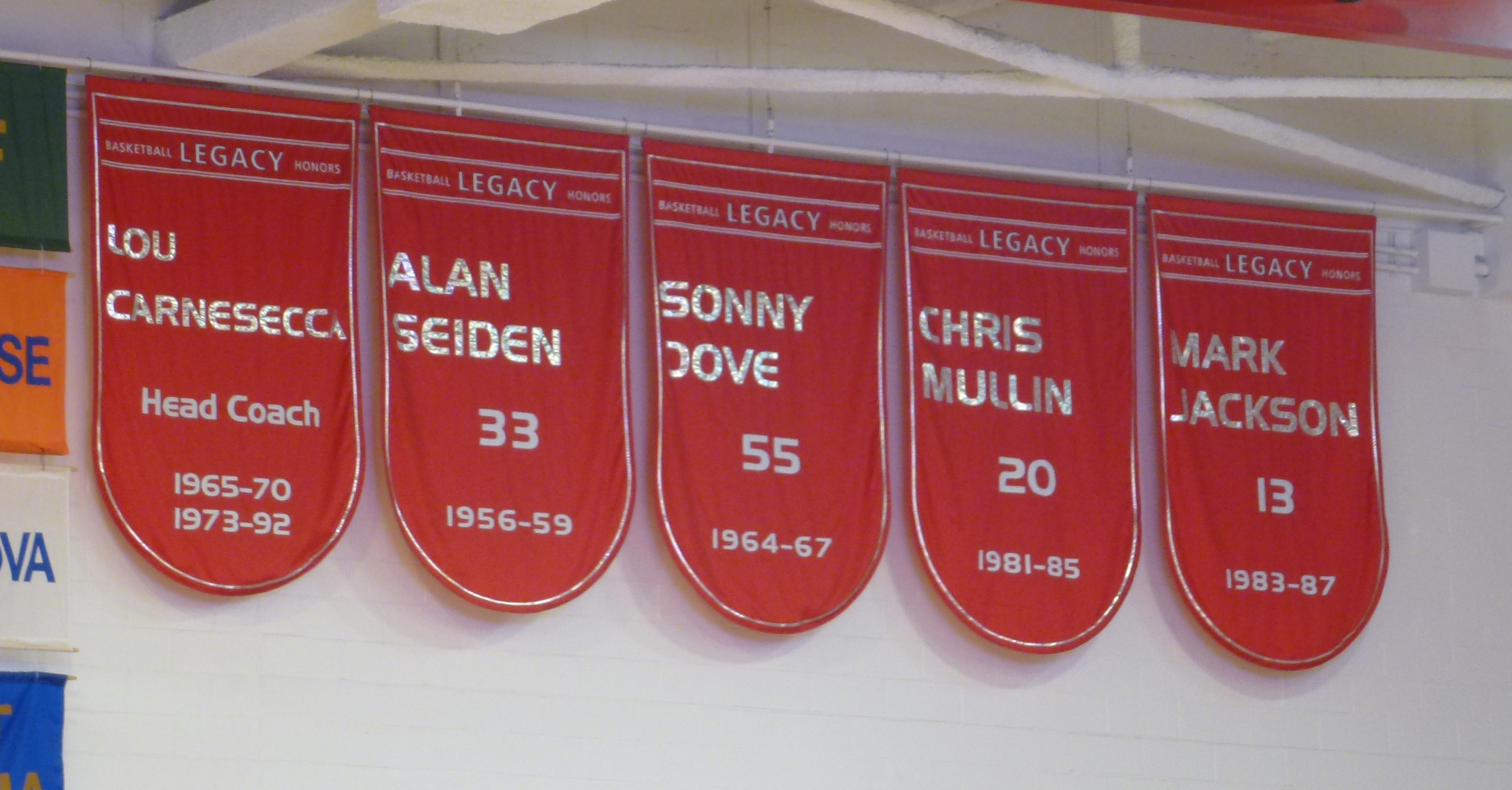
Sonny Dove's retired number

Dove attended St. John's University, where he was a forward and played for three seasons. He started under the legendary coach Joe Lapchick and was nicknamed the "Big Indian", as the team was called the Redmen. At St. John's, Dove as of 1983 was the fifth-highest scorer and second-ranked rebounder in its basketball history. In his last season of 1966–67, before being recruited by a professional team, Dove was captain of a team with a 23–5 record.

As of 2008, when Dove was selected posthumously for the "All-Century Team" of St. John's, he was one of only two players in the university basketball program's history with more than 1,000 career points (he ranked 10th with 1,576 points) and more than 1,000 career rebounds (he ranked 2nd with 1,036).

== Career and death ==
Dove was selected by the Detroit Pistons with the fourth pick of the 1967 NBA draft. He played two years with the Pistons before joining the New York Nets of the ABA, with whom he remained until 1972. In his NBA/ABA career, Dove averaged 11.1 points per game and 6.0 rebounds per game. His pro career ended when he shattered his leg in a bicycle accident.

After his pro career, Dove returned to St. John's University and completed his degree. He went into sports radio broadcasting, often sharing comments on basketball games with other former pro players. In the 1980s he was partnered with Dave Halberstam in commenting on St. John's University basketball games.

Dove was also a taxi driver. He died at age 37 from injuries in an accident when the taxi he was driving skidded off a partially open bridge into the Gowanus Canal in Brooklyn in February 1983. A memorial Mass was held at St. Catherine of Siena Roman Catholic Church, St. Albans, Queens.

== Marriage and family ==
Dove was married to Patricia. At the time of his death, Dove and his wife were separated. Dove had three children: Zaynid and Kimberly with Patricia, and Leslie with common-law wife Ellen.

== Career statistics ==
Legend
GP	Games played	GS	Games started	MPG	Minutes per game
FG%	Field goal percentage	3P%	3-point field goal percentage	FT%	Free throw percentage
RPG	Rebounds per game	APG	Assists per game	SPG	Steals per game
BPG	Blocks per game	PPG	Points per game	**Bold**	Career high

=== NBA/ABA ===
==== Regular season ====
Year	Team	GP	MPG	FG%	3P%	FT%	RPG	APG	PPG
1967–68	Detroit	28	5.8	.293		.462	1.9	.4	2.0
1968–69	Detroit	29	8.1	**.470**		.667	2.1	.4	4.1
1969–70	N.Y. Nets (ABA)	80	**28.6**	.462	.154	.633	6.8	**1.3**	**14.4**
1970–71	N.Y. Nets (ABA)	**83**	27.5	.464	**.286**	**.681**	**8.1**	1.1	13.5
1971–72	N.Y. Nets (ABA)	2	4.5	.400	–	.667	.5	.5	3.0
Career (NBA)		57	7.0	.394		.581	2.0	.4	3.1
Career (ABA)		165	27.7	.463	.222	.653	7.4	1.2	13.8
Career (overall)		222	22.4	.457	.222	.647	6.0	1.0	11.1

==== Playoffs ====
Year	Team	GP	MPG	FG%	3P%	FT%	RPG	APG	PPG
1968	Detroit	2	3.0	**.500**		–	1.0	.0	2.0
1970	N.Y. Nets (ABA)	**7**	**40.1**	.495	**.250**	**.667**	**10.1**	**1.3**	**17.6**
1971	N.Y. Nets (ABA)	5	6.4	**.500**	–	.250	2.2	.2	2.2
Career (ABA)		12	26.1	.495	.250	.628	6.8	.8	11.2
Career (overall)		14	22.8	.495	.250	.628	6.0	.7	9.9

== Legacy and honors ==
- 1967, Haggerty Award
- 1967, Consensus NCAA All-American Second Team
- 1967 gold medal for basketball team, Pan American Games, Winnipeg
- 2005, named among the first 10 men selected for "Basketball Legacy Honors" at St. John's University
- 2008, named to St. John's University "All-Century Team"
- 2011, inducted into the New York City Basketball Hall of Fame
