= 1971–72 New York Nets season =

ABA basketball team season

- Head coach: Lou Carnesecca
- Arena: Nassau Veterans Memorial Coliseum

Results
- Record: 44–40 (.524)
- Place: Division: 3rd (Eastern (ABA))
- Playoff finish: ABA Finals (lost to Pacers 2–4)
- Stats at Basketball Reference

The 1971–72 New York Nets season was the fifth season of the franchise and fourth season in the state of New York after previously debuting in the ABA as the New Jersey Americans. They finished the season in third place among the six-team Eastern Division, qualifying for the 1972 ABA Playoffs by nine games over the fifth place Carolina Cougars and eight games over "The Floridians" franchise (who finished in fourth place in what later turned out to be their final season in that team's existence) for the third straight year. Despite having a negative looking start to the first round by having them compete against the Kentucky Colonels (who finished with the ABA's best record ever at 68–16 this season) instead of against the regional-based Virginia Squires, the Nets would end up upsetting the Colonels with a 4–2 series win before later facing off against the Virginia Squires (who were led by rookie phenom Julius Erving (who the Nets were also interested in obtaining after the 1971 ABA draft ended), but were without Charlie Scott due to him leaving the Squires to play for the Phoenix Suns in the rivaling NBA following a trade they made with the Boston Celtics before the start of the playoffs). Despite the series going down to the wire with an undermanned Squires team, the Nets would still prevail with a 4–3 series win to get the Nets their first ABA Finals appearance. Once they made it to the 1972 ABA Finals, they would meet their end to the Indiana Pacers, who would beat the Nets 4–2 to obtain their second ABA Finals Championship in three seasons (first one while representing the Western Division instead of the Eastern Division).

Rick Barry averaged 31.5 points per game in what would be his final season with not just the Nets franchise, but also while in the ABA altogether. Barry was forced to return to his former NBA team, the Golden State Warriors, due to an injunction issued by the United States District Court prohibiting him from playing for any professional team other than the Warriors after his Nets contract ended, which occurred during this season.

== ABA Draft ==
This draft was the first ABA draft to have a properly recorded historical note of every round in their draft available.

Round	Pick	Player	Position(s)	Nationality	College
2	16	Charlie Davis	PG	United States	Wake Forest
2	17	Bob Kissane	F	United States	Holy Cross
3	32	Marvin Stewart	G	United States	Nebraska
4	39	Dick Gibbs	SF	United States	UTEP
5	50	Glen Summors	F	United States	Gannon College
6	61	Matt Necaise	F	United States	William Carey College
7	72	Odis Allison	SF	United States	UNLV
8	83	John Duncan	F	United States	Kentucky Wesleyan
9	94	Jarrett Durham	F	United States	Duquesne
11	116	Bill Warner	G	United States	Arizona
12	126	Blaine Henry	G	United States	Marshall
13	136	Don Ward	G	United States	Colgate
14	145	Skip Young	G	United States	Florida State
15	154	Phillip Sisk	G	United States	Georgia Southern College
16	163	Brian Mahoney	SG	United States	Manhattan College
17	171	Ollie Shannon	G	United States	Minnesota
18	178	Bob Doyle	SG	United States	UTEP
19	184	Calvin Oliver	F	United States	Pan American College
20	189	Greg Cluess	PF/C	United States	St. John's

This draft was notable for the Nets for a few reasons. First, the Nets were the only ABA team to trade away their tenth round pick to another team in this draft, with them trading it to the Pittsburgh Condors (who would later cease to exist as a franchise the following season after this one) for something unknown to us (maybe money?) some time before the draft began. Second, the Nets would technically have the last selection of the 1971 ABA draft so long as one remembers that the Indiana Pacers' final selection for this draft, which was the 190th pick of the draft, turned out to be a prank selection they made on the entire ABA with them choosing a player named "Slick Pinkham" (which was a gag name portmanteau of Pacers head coach Bobby "Slick" Leonard" and Dick Tinkham) from DePauw University (which was the university that Tinkham both attended and played basketball for in his youth). Finally, this draft period was notable for the Nets being one of two teams alongside the Virginia Squires to inquire genuine interest in the University of Massachusetts' small forward Julius Erving; while Erving would ultimately join the Squires instead of the Nets (thus denying them the opportunity of having Julius Erving playing alongside Rick Barry during his final season with the Nets), he would later get traded to the Nets and help the team out with winning ABA championships in two of their final three seasons of play while in the ABA, to the point of later having his number be retired by the Nets franchise despite only playing for them for a few years before the ABA-NBA merger in 1976 gutted the team's chances of winning in the NBA with Erving playing there (choosing their own survival in the long-term over their superstar player), as well as eventually be named the ABA's All-Time MVP despite playing in the league for only five whole seasons.

=== ABA Special Circumstances Draft ===
Before the regular season began for the ABA, they would host a unique little draft held in Memphis, Tennessee (home of the Memphis Pros) called the "Special Circumstances Draft" that was done in response to the NBA implementing a new mini-draft of theirs for college undergraduate players called the "Hardship Draft" during the 1971 NBA draft period. Similar to the "Hardship Draft" in the NBA, only a select few teams would actually end up participating in this specific draft (in this case, the New York Nets, Carolina Cougars, and Denver Rockets). Unlike the "Hardship Draft" for the NBA (which saw five players get selected in that specific draft), however, the "Special Circumstances Draft" that the ABA held on September 10, 1971 (the same day as the NBA's own "Hardship Draft") had only three total players (all junior players while in college) get selected in this draft, with two players get selected in the second round and one player selected in the fourth round (meaning no first round or third round draft picks were made in that draft and the second round actually held the #1 pick in this particular draft). Because of the unusual formatting done there, the Denver Rockets would technically get the #1 pick in this specific draft, while the Nets got the #3 pick in the fourth round with their only selection there.

Round	Pick	Player	Position(s)	Nationality	College
4	1 (3)	Ed Leftwich	SG	United States	North Carolina State

Out of the three players selected in the "Special Circumstances Draft", only Ed Leftwich from North Carolina State University would end up not playing professionally for either the ABA or the rivaling NBA whatsoever.

== Roster ==
1971–72 New York Nets roster
Players

Pos.	No.	Player	Height	Weight	DOB	From
C	12	Jim Ard	6 ft 8 in (2.03 m)	215 lb (98 kg)	1948-09-19	Cincinnati
SF	24	Rick Barry	6 ft 7 in (2.01 m)	205 lb (93 kg)	1944-03-28	Miami (FL)
SF	20	Johnny Baum	6 ft 5 in (1.96 m)	200 lb (91 kg)	1946-06-17	Temple
SG	21	Joe DePre	6 ft 3 in (1.91 m)	185 lb (84 kg)	1947-12-19	St. John's
PF	11	Sonny Dove	6 ft 7 in (2.01 m)	198 lb (90 kg)	1945-08-16	St. John's
F	23	Jarrett Durham	6 ft 5 in (1.96 m)	188 lb (85 kg)	1949-08-22	Duquesne
SF	14	Bob Greacen	6 ft 7 in (2.01 m)	206 lb (93 kg)	1947-09-15	Rutgers
C	3	Manny Leaks	6 ft 8 in (2.03 m)	225 lb (102 kg)	1945-11-27	Niagara
PG	25	Bill Melchionni	6 ft 1 in (1.85 m)	165 lb (75 kg)	1944-10-19	Villanova
C	10	Gene Moore	6 ft 9 in (2.06 m)	225 lb (102 kg)	1945-07-29	Saint Louis
C	5	Billy Paultz	6 ft 11 in (2.11 m)	235 lb (107 kg)	1948-07-30	St. John's
SG	13	John Roche	6 ft 3 in (1.91 m)	170 lb (77 kg)	1949-09-26	South Carolina
SG	22	Ollie Taylor	6 ft 2 in (1.88 m)	194 lb (88 kg)	1947-03-07	Houston
PF	32	Trooper Washington	6 ft 7 in (2.01 m)	215 lb (98 kg)	1944-04-21	Cheyney
F	4	Elnardo Webster	6 ft 5 in (1.96 m)	190 lb (86 kg)	1948-03-06	Saint Peter's
SG	14	Gary Zeller	6 ft 3 in (1.91 m)	205 lb (93 kg)	1947-11-20	Drake

Coaches
Head coach
- Lou Carnesecca

Legend
- (DP) Unsigned draft pick
- (FA) Free agent
- (S) Suspended
- Injured

Roster

== Final standings ==
1972–73 ABA Western Standings
Eastern Division	W	L	PCT.	GB
Kentucky Colonels	68	16	.810	-
Virginia Squires	45	39	.536	23
New York Nets	44	40	.524	24
The Floridians	36	48	.429	32
Carolina Cougars	35	49	.417	33
Pittsburgh Condors	25	59	.405	43

== ABA Playoffs ==
ABA Eastern Division Semifinals vs. Kentucky Colonels

Game	Date	Location	Score	Record	Attendance
1	April 1	Kentucky	122–108	1–0	4,772
2	April 4	Kentucky	105–90	2–0	8,212
3	April 5	New York	99–105	2–1	14,056
4	April 7	New York	100–92	3–1	14,896
5	April 8	Kentucky	103–109	3–2	7,949
6	April 10	New York	101–96	4–2	11,533

Nets win series, 4–2

ABA Eastern Division Finals vs. Virginia Squires

Game	Date	Location	Score	Record	Attendance
1	April 13	Richmond (Virginia)	91–138	0–1	5,526
2	April 15	Norfolk (Virginia)	106–115	0–2	10,410
3	April 24	New York	119–117	1–2	11,893
4	April 26	New York	118–107	2–2	11,164
5	April 29	Hampton (Virginia)	107–116	2–3	6,309
6	May 1	New York	146–136	3–3	11,152
7	May 4	Norfolk (Virginia)	94–88	4–3	10,410

Nets win series, 4–3

ABA Finals vs. Indiana Pacers

Game	Date	Location	Result	Record	Attendance
1	May 6	Indiana	103–124	0–1	7,483
2	May 9	Indiana	117–115	1–1	10,079
3	May 12	New York	108–114	1–2	15,241
4	May 15	New York	110–105	2–2	15,890
5	May 18	Indiana	99–100	2–3	10,079
6	May 20	New York	105–108	2–4	10,434

Nets lose championship series, 4–2
