= List of second-generation NBA players =

The following is a list of father-and-son combinations who have played in the National Basketball Association (NBA). The list includes players who played for the Basketball Association of America (BAA) before it was renamed NBA in 1949, as well as the National Basketball League (NBL), which was absorbed by the NBA in 1949, and the original American Basketball Association (ABA), which was merged with the NBA in 1976.

== Father–son ==
Father	Son(s)	Notes	Ref.
Greg Anthony	Cole Anthony	• Both played for the Milwaukee Bucks	
Rick Barry	Jon Barry; Brent Barry; Drew Barry	• Rick and Brent are the second father-son duo to win NBA championships as players • Rick, Jon and Brent all played for and ended their playing career with the Houston Rockets • Rick, Jon and Drew all played for the Golden State Warriors	
Henry Bibby	Mike Bibby	• Both played for the New York Knicks	
Manute Bol	Bol Bol		
Melvin Booker	Devin Booker	• Both played against Kobe Bryant and Kevin Garnett during their respective careers	
Carlos Boozer	Cameron Boozer		
Ron Brewer	Ronnie Brewer	• Both played for the Chicago Bulls	
Rick Brunson	Jalen Brunson	• First father and son duo to reach the NBA finals as players with the same NBA franchise (New York Knicks, 1999, 2026). • Rick serves as a Knicks assistant coach, while Jalen plays for them.	
Joe Bryant	Kobe Bryant		
Chris Carr	Cameron Carr		
Anthony Carter	Devin Carter		
Wayne Chapman	Rex Chapman	• Wayne played in the ABA	
Charles Claxton	Nic Claxton		
Richard Coffey	Amir Coffey		
Norm Cook	Brian Cook		
Corey Crowder	Jae Crowder	• Both played for the Utah Jazz	
Dell Curry	Stephen Curry; Seth Curry	• Both Dell and Seth played for the Charlotte Hornets	
Dale Davis	Trayce Jackson-Davis	• Both played for the Golden State Warriors	
Mark Davis	Johnny Davis		
Terry Davis	Ed Davis		
Darren Daye	Austin Daye		
Larry Drew	Larry Drew II		
Rich Dumas	Richard Dumas	• Rich played in the ABA	
Mike Dunleavy Sr.	Mike Dunleavy Jr.	• Both played for the Milwaukee Bucks • Mike Sr. & Mike Jr. are the second father/son coach/player pairing to compete against each other in an NBA game	
Bill Edwards	Vincent Edwards		
LeRoy Ellis	LeRon Ellis		
Patrick Ewing	Patrick Ewing Jr.	• Patrick Jr. played a total of seven preseason games for the New York Knicks, his father's old team, but never played a regular-season game with them.	
Bob Ferry	Danny Ferry		
Winston Garland	Darius Garland	• Both played for the Los Angeles Clippers.	
Dick Garrett	Diante Garrett		
Harvey Grant	Jerami Grant; Jerian Grant	• Harvey Grant's identical twin brother, Horace Grant, also played in the NBA. Horace and Jerian both played for the Chicago Bulls and Orlando Magic. • Harvey and Jerami both played for the Philadelphia 76ers and Portland Trail Blazers. • Harvey and Jerian both played for the Washington Wizards.	
Sidney Green	Taurean Green		
Adrian Griffin	AJ Griffin		
Matt Guokas Sr.	Matt Guokas Jr.	• Matt Sr. and Matt Jr. are the first father-son duo to win NBA championships as players	
Tim Hardaway	Tim Hardaway Jr.	• Both played for the Dallas Mavericks, Denver Nuggets and Miami Heat • While with the Mavericks, both became teammates with Dirk Nowitzki during their careers.	
Ron Harper	Ron Harper Jr. Dylan Harper		
Gerald Henderson	Gerald Henderson Jr.	• Both played for the Philadelphia 76ers.	
Carl Henry	Xavier Henry		
Earle Higgins	Sean Higgins	• Earle played in the ABA	
Rod Higgins	Cory Higgins		
Tito Horford	Al Horford		
Bill Hosket Sr.	Bill Hosket Jr.	• Bill Sr. played in the NBL	
Juwan Howard	Jett Howard	• Both played for the Orlando Magic and Dallas Mavericks.	
Jaren Jackson	Jaren Jackson Jr.		
LeBron James	Bronny James	• LeBron and Bronny are the first-ever father/son duo to play together in an NBA game. • Highest-scoring father-son duo in NBA history	
Wali Jones	Askia Jones		
George Karl	Coby Karl	• George & Coby are the third father/son coach/player pairing to compete against each other in an NBA game	
Frank Kornet	Luke Kornet		
Stan Love	Kevin Love		
John Lucas Jr.	John Lucas III	• Both played for the Houston Rockets	
Ed Manning	Danny Manning		
Pace Mannion	Nico Mannion		
Press Maravich	Pete Maravich		
Roy Marble	Devyn Marble		
Kenyon Martin	Kenyon Martin Jr.	• Both played for the Los Angeles Clippers.	
Wes Matthews	Wesley Matthews	• Both played for the Los Angeles Lakers	
Scott May	Sean May		
Al McGuire	Allie McGuire	• Both played for the New York Knicks	
George Mikan	Larry Mikan		
Pete Mount	Rick Mount	• Pete played in the NBL	
Jay Murphy	Erik Murphy		
Larry Nance	Larry Nance Jr. Pete Nance	• All 3 played for Cleveland Cavaliers. Larry Sr. allowed Larry Jr. to wear his #22 while with the Cavaliers, even though it had been retired in his honor.	
Ruben Nembhard	RJ Nembhard		
Sonny Parker	Jabari Parker		
Jim Paxson Sr.	Jim Paxson Jr. John Paxson		
Gary Payton	Gary Payton II	• Both played for the Milwaukee Bucks and Los Angeles Lakers • Payton and Payton II are the fifth father-son duo to win NBA championships as players	
Curtis Perry	Byron Houston		
Scottie Pippen	Scotty Pippen Jr.	• Scottie and Scotty are the first father-son duo to each record a triple-double.	
Paul Pressey	Phil Pressey		
Walt Piatkowski	Eric Piatkowski	• Walt played in the ABA.	
Tony Price	A. J. Price		
Leo Rautins	Andy Rautins		
Glen Rice	Glen Rice Jr.		
Jason Richardson	Jase Richardson	• Both played for the Orlando Magic	
Doc Rivers	Austin Rivers	• Both played for the Los Angeles Clippers • Doc & Austin are the fourth father/son coach/player pairing to compete against each other in an NBA game • Austin is the first son to play for his father in an NBA game	
Glenn Robinson	Glenn Robinson III		
Walker Russell Sr.	Walker Russell Jr.	• Both started their playing career with the Detroit Pistons	
Arvydas Sabonis	Domantas Sabonis		
Al Salvadori	Kevin Salvadori	• Al played in the ABA	
Dolph Schayes	Danny Schayes		
Jeff Sheppard	Reed Sheppard		
James Silas	Xavier Silas		
Derek Smith	Nolan Smith		
Jabari Smith	Jabari Smith Jr.		
John Stockton	David Stockton	• Both played for the Utah Jazz	
Walter Szczerbiak	Wally Szczerbiak	• Walter played in the ABA	
Jeff Taylor	Jeffery Taylor		
Collis Temple	Garrett Temple	• Collis played in the ABA • Both played for the San Antonio Spurs	
Mychal Thompson	Mychel Thompson; Klay Thompson	• Mychal and Klay are the fourth father-son duo to win NBA championships as players • Mychel and Klay's brother, Trayce Thompson, played as an outfielder for five Major League Baseball teams	
Stephen Thompson	Ethan Thompson		
Gary Trent	Gary Trent Jr.	• In 1998, Gary Trent was traded from the Portland Trail Blazers to the Toronto Raptors 41 games into his third season; 23 years later, Gary Jr. was also traded from the Trail Blazers to the Raptors 41 games into his third season	
Butch van Breda Kolff	Jan van Breda Kolff	• Butch & Jan are the first father/son coach/player pairing to compete against each other in an NBA game	
Ernie Vandeweghe	Kiki Vandeweghe	• Both played for the New York Knicks	
David Vaughn Jr.	David Vaughn III	• David Jr. played in the ABA	
Brett Vroman	Jackson Vroman		
Milt Wagner	Dajuan Wagner		
Jimmy Walker	Jalen Rose		
Samaki Walker	Jabari Walker		
Bill Walton	Luke Walton	• Bill and Luke were the third father-son duo to win NBA championships as players, and the first to win multiple titles each.	
Chris Washburn	Julian Washburn		
Duane Washington	Duane Washington Jr.		
Mitchell Wiggins	Andrew Wiggins		
Gerald Wilkins	Damien Wilkins	• Gerald Wilkins' brother, Dominique Wilkins, also played in the NBA. Damien later played for the Atlanta Hawks, Dominique's former team.	
Rickie Winslow	Justise Winslow		
Michael Young	Joe Young		

== Grandfather–grandson ==
Grandfather	Grandson(s)	Notes	Ref.
John Barber	Jason Sasser; Jeryl Sasser		
Joe Caldwell	Marvin Bagley III; Marcus Bagley		
Bruce Hale	Jon Barry; Brent Barry; Drew Barry	• Bruce Hale's son-in-law is Rick Barry	
Maurice King	Ish Wainright		
Ronnie Shavlik	Shavlik Randolph		
John Townsend	Eric Montross	• Townsend played in the NBL	

== See also ==
- List of professional sports families
- List of family relations in American football
  - List of second-generation NFL players
- List of association football (soccer) families
  - List of African association football families
  - List of European association football families
    - List of English association football families
    - List of former Yugoslavia association football families
    - List of Scottish football families
    - List of Spanish association football families
  - Category:Association football families
- List of Australian rules football families
- List of second-generation Major League Baseball players
- List of boxing families
- List of chess families
- List of International cricket families
- List of family relations in the NHL
- List of family relations in rugby league
- List of international rugby union families
- List of professional wrestling families
