= 1970–71 New York Nets season =

ABA basketball team season

- Head coach: Lou Carnesecca
- Arena: Island Garden

Results
- Record: 40–44 (.476)
- Place: Division: 3rd (Eastern (ABA))
- Playoff finish: Division semifinals (lost to Squires 2–4)

The 1970–71 New York Nets season was the fourth season of the franchise and third season using the New York Nets name after first playing as the New Jersey Americans in their inaugural season. On January 6, 1971, during a game versus the Memphis Pros, referee Andy Hershock suffered a heart attack, later dying in the medical office at Island Garden. The game was later restarted, with the Nets winning 110–101. Two months later, they played the Kentucky Colonels in a doubleheader benefit game for Hershock.

This was also Rick Barry's first season with the Nets after he expressed his sincerest public desires to not play for the Virginia Squires out in the state of Virginia. Barry averaged 29.4 points per game.

== Roster ==
1970–71 New York Nets roster
Players

Pos.	No.	Player	Height	Weight	DOB	From
C	12	Jim Ard	6 ft 8 in (2.03 m)	215 lb (98 kg)	1948-09-19	Cincinnati
SF	24	Rick Barry	6 ft 7 in (2.01 m)	205 lb (93 kg)	1944-03-28	Miami (FL)
SF	3, 15	Bill Bunting	6 ft 8 in (2.03 m)	200 lb (91 kg)	1947-08-26	North Carolina
PG	4	Jeff Congdon	6 ft 1 in (1.85 m)	180 lb (82 kg)	1943-10-17	BYU
G	3	Billy DeAngelis	6 ft 1 in (1.85 m)	180 lb (82 kg)	1946-10-05	Saint Joseph's
SG	21	Joe DePre	6 ft 3 in (1.91 m)	185 lb (84 kg)	1947-12-19	St. John's
PF	11	Sonny Dove	6 ft 7 in (2.01 m)	198 lb (90 kg)	1945-08-16	St. John's
PF	14	Luther Green	6 ft 7 in (2.01 m)	190 lb (86 kg)	1946-11-13	LIU Brooklyn
SG	10, 15	Jim Hayes	6 ft 3 in (1.91 m)	200 lb (91 kg)	1948-02-18	Boston University
PF	40	Les Hunter	6 ft 7 in (2.01 m)	210 lb (95 kg)	1942-08-16	Loyola Chicago
C	20	Ed Johnson	6 ft 8 in (2.03 m)	205 lb (93 kg)	1944-06-17	Tennessee State
C	3	Manny Leaks	6 ft 8 in (2.03 m)	225 lb (102 kg)	1945-11-27	Niagara
PG	25	Bill Melchionni	6 ft 1 in (1.85 m)	165 lb (75 kg)	1944-10-19	Villanova
C	5	Billy Paultz	6 ft 11 in (2.11 m)	235 lb (107 kg)	1948-07-30	St. John's
SG	23	Levern Tart	6 ft 2 in (1.88 m)	195 lb (88 kg)	1942-06-01	Bradley
SG	22	Ollie Taylor	6 ft 2 in (1.88 m)	194 lb (88 kg)	1947-03-07	Houston

Coaches
Head coach
- Lou Carnesecca

Legend
- (DP) Unsigned draft pick
- (FA) Free agent
- (S) Suspended
- Injured

Roster

== Final standings ==
=== Eastern Division ===
Eastern Division	W	L	PCT	GB
Virginia Squires *	55	29	.655	—
Kentucky Colonels *	44	40	.524	11.0
New York Nets *	40	44	.476	15.0
The Floridians *	37	47	.440	18.0
Pittsburgh Condors	36	48	.429	19.0
Carolina Cougars	34	50	.405	21.0

== ABA Playoffs ==
ABA Eastern Division Semifinals vs. Virginia Squires

Game	Date	Location	Score	Record	Attendance
1	April 2	Hampton (Virginia)	105–113	0–1	6,149
2	April 4	Hampton (Virginia)	114–108	0–2	7,143
3	April 6	New York	135–131	1–2	3,504
4	April 7	New York	130–127	2–2	4,134
5	April 9	Richmond (Virginia)	124–127	2–3	4,250
6	April 10	New York	114–118	2–4	3,016

Nets lose series, 4–2
