= Lou Carnesecca =

American basketball coach (1925–2024)

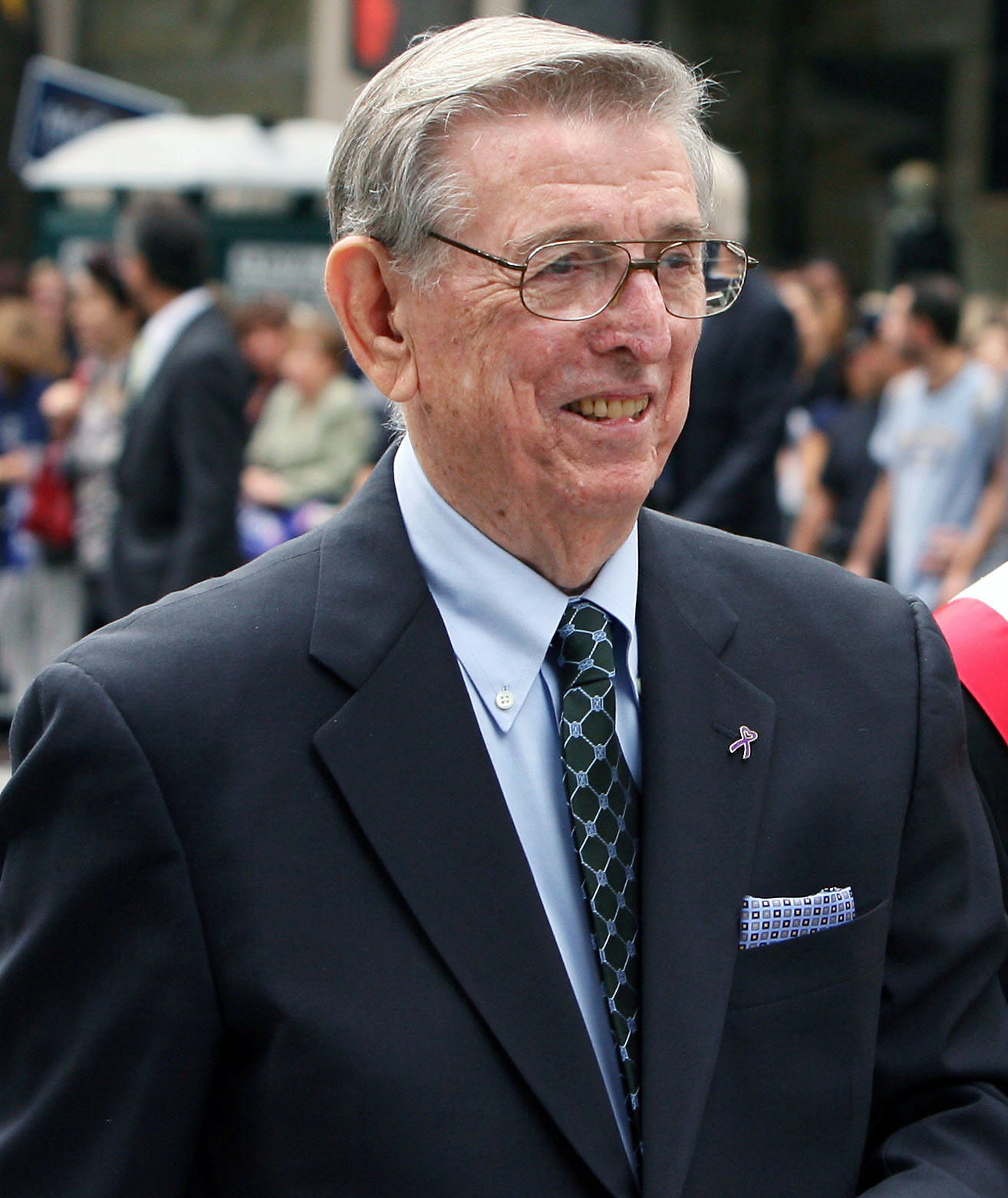
- Carnesecca in 2008

Biographical details
- Born: January 5, 1925; New York City, New York, U.S.
- Died: November 30, 2024 (aged 99); New York City, New York, U.S.
- Education: St. John's

Coaching career (HC unless noted)
- 1950–1958: St. Ann's Academy HS
- 1958–1965: St. John's (assistant)
- 1965–1970: St. John's
- 1970–1973: New York Nets
- 1973–1992: St. John's

Head coaching record
- Overall: 205–34 (high school); 526–200 (college); 114–138 (ABA)
- Tournaments: 17–20 (NCAA Division I); 10–6 (NIT)

Accomplishments and honors

Championships
- NCAA Division I Regional – Final Four (1985); NIT (1989); 5× Big East regular season (1980, 1983, 1985, 1986, 1992); 2× Big East tournament (1983, 1986); 2× CHSAA (1952, 1958)

Awards
- 2× Henry Iba Award (1983, 1985); NABC Coach of the Year (1983); UPI Coach of the Year (1985); 3× Big East Coach of the Year (1983, 1985, 1986); New York City Basketball Hall of Fame (1993)
- Basketball Hall of Fame; Inducted in 1992 (profile)
- College Basketball Hall of Fame; Inducted in 2006

Luigi P. Carnesecca (January 5, 1925 – November 30, 2024) was an American men's college basketball coach at St. John's University. Carnesecca also coached at the professional level, leading the New York Nets of the American Basketball Association (ABA) for three seasons. Carnesecca was elected to the Naismith Memorial Basketball Hall of Fame in 1992 and the New York City Basketball Hall of Fame in 1993.

He coached the St. John's basketball program to 526 wins and 200 losses over 24 seasons (1965–70, 1973–92). The colorful "Looie" (as he was popularly known by fans and by the media) reached the post-season in every season he coached the team, including a Final Four appearance in 1985. He was selected as the National Coach of the Year in 1983 and 1985 by the U.S. Basketball Writers Association.

Carnesecca was widely known for his sense of humor and his signature sweaters. In November 2004, St. John's University officially dedicated and renamed the historic Alumni Hall to Carnesecca Arena.

== Early life and education ==
Carnesecca was born in New York City on January 5, 1925. His parents, Alfredo Carnesecca and Adele Pinotti, were Italian immigrants from Cargalla, a hamlet (frazione) of Pontremoli, Tuscany. He grew up in East Harlem, New York.

He attended high school at St. Ann's Academy in Manhattan (now Archbishop Molloy High School). Upon graduation, he served for three years in the U.S. Coast Guard during World War II, where he served on a troop transport in the Pacific theater.

== Basketball career ==
Upon discharge from the Coast Guard, Carnesecca then enrolled at St. John's and graduated in 1950. He also coached his high school alma mater, St. Ann's, where he was succeeded by Jack Curran.

Carnesecca became an assistant basketball coach under Joe Lapchick in 1957. Eight years later, he was promoted to head coach when Lapchick retired. He coached there until 1970, when he received an enticing monetary offer to become head coach and general manager of the ABA's New York Nets. The team qualified for the postseason in each of the three seasons with Carnesecca at the helm. The 1971–72 Nets finished third in the regular season but reached the ABA Finals, where they were defeated by the Indiana Pacers in six games. Despite the loss of Rick Barry and a 30–53 record, the Nets edged out the Memphis Tams for fourth place and the final playoff berth in the Eastern Division in 1972–73. With two years remaining on his contract, he resigned after the year ended. He reflected upon the experience years later: "Coaching is coaching. But the lifestyle in the pros – the travel, the number of games, working with players who want to be told they’re the best thing money could buy – that wasn’t for me. I always loved teaching the game. I loved watching players get better. College was a better fit for me."

Wanting to return to St. John's, Carnesecca announced his return on March 27, 1973. He replaced Frank Mulzoff, his successor from three years earlier who had resigned after a 19–7 campaign. His first team back won 12 of their last thirteen games to finish with 20 wins but were only invited to the NIT. They lost to Connecticut in the first round. His next two teams entered and lost the ECAC Metro tournament to Rutgers, but the 1975–76 squad made the NCAA tournament, losing in the first round. In the next three years in the "New Jersey-New York 7 Conference", the team finished near the top of play, and they won the 1978 ECAC Metro tournament. The 1978–79 squad lost in the Metro tournament but was invited to the NCAA tournament as a #10 seed and made a run all the way to the Elite Eight (most notably upsetting #2 Duke), marking the first appearance for the school in that round since 1952. They lost to Penn (who as a #9 seed had upset #1 North Carolina on their own surprise run). in a 64-62 nailbiter. In 1979, the team joined the Big East Conference, where Carnesecca would coach for the rest of his career. They won a share of the regular season title in his first season there.

The 1982–83 squad won the Big East tournament for their first formal conference tournament championship in school history. In the first five years of Big East play, St. John's advanced to the Sweet Sixteen just once. But the 1984–85 squad would change that quickly. Composed of six future NBA players (most notably Chris Mullin) and a squad where all but one player was from the New York area, St. John's was ranked #3 to start the season and advanced all the way to #2 before playing Georgetown, then ranked #1 on January 26. They beat them in a 66–65 nailbiter to become ranked #1 in the AP Poll. They would stay that way for multiple weeks before suffering a loss to #2 Georgetown in February, but they finished the regular season 25–2. They advanced all the way to the Big East tournament championship but lost to Georgetown 80–92. They were given a #1 seed in the NCAA tournament and made the most of it, defeating four straight opponents, which included a victory over NC State by a score of 69–60 to achieve their first Final Four since 1952. They faced Georgetown in the Final Four matchup and lost 77–59. The subsequent squad would win 31 games and win a share of the regular season title before winning the Big East tournament. However, they were shocked by Auburn in the second round. The next two teams lost 21 games combined but made the NCAA tournament each time.

The 1988–89 squad had a 12–4 start but cratered to 15-13 and a crash-out at the Big East tournament. Their reward was being invited to the NIT. With the first two games at Alumni Hall in Queens, they won each game before managing to defeat Ohio State in overtime to enter the NIT Semifinal and defeat UAB 76–65. They faced Saint Louis in the NIT Championship and won 73–65. It was their first NIT Championship since 1965, and it was Carnesecca's only postseason championship. St. John's won 24 games the next year and lost in the second round of the NCAA tournament. The 1990–91 squad fell one game short of the Final Four with a loss to Duke in the NCAA Regional Final. Carnesecca closed out his career with one last season that saw St. John's go 19-11 but win a share of the Big East regular season championship. On April 12, he announced he would retire at the end of the season, stating "It's going to be very difficult to put the ball down, but the time has come. Why? Two really simple reasons. I still have half my marbles and I still have a wonderful taste in my mouth about basketball. It has not been an easy decision but it's something I wanted to do." Reportedly, he had wanted to retire two years earlier but had been convinced to stay by university president Rev. Donald J. Harrington. A 61–57 loss to Tulane in the First Round of the NCAA tournament was the last game coached by Carnesecca. Overall, he coached the team to 526 wins and 200 losses over 24 seasons (1965–70, 1973–92).

== Personal life and death ==
Carnesecca married Mary Chiesa in 1951, and they had one daughter. Carnesecca died on November 30, 2024, at the age of 99.

== Head coaching record ==
=== High school ===
Record table
Season	Team	Overall	Conference	Standing	Postseason
St. Ann's Academy / Archbishop Molloy High School (Catholic High School Athletic Association) (1950–1958)
1950–51	St. Ann's	13–11			
1951–52	St. Ann's	24–6			CHSAA Champion
1952–53	St. Ann's	26–5			
1953–54	St. Ann's	29–1			CHSAA Final
1954–55	St. Ann's	26–4			
1955–56	St. Ann's	26–4			CHSAA Final
1956–57	St. Ann's	29–3			
1957–58	Archbishop Molloy	32–0			CHSAA Champion
St. Ann's / Archbishop Molloy:		205–34 (.858)			
Total:		205–34 (.858)			
National champion Postseason invitational champion Conference regular season champion Conference regular season and conference tournament champion Division regular season champion Division regular season and conference tournament champion Conference tournament champion

=== College ===
Record table
Season	Team	Overall	Conference	Standing	Postseason
St. John's Redmen (NCAA University Division independent) (1965–1970)
1965–66	St. John's	18–8			NIT first round
1966–67	St. John's	23–5			NCAA University Division Regional semifinals
1967–68	St. John's	19–8			NCAA University Division first round
1968–69	St. John's	23–6			NCAA University Division Regional semifinals
1969–70	St. John's	21–8			NIT Runner-up
St. John's Redmen (NCAA Division I independent) (1973–1976)
1973–74	St. John's	20–7			NIT first round
1974–75	St. John's	21–10			NIT Fourth Place
1975–76	St. John's	23–6			NCAA Division I first round
St. John's Redmen (New Jersey-New York 7 Conference) (1976–1979)
1976–77	St. John's	22–9	3–2	T–3rd	NCAA Division I first round
1977–78	St. John's	21–7	5–1	T–1st	NCAA Division I first round
1978–79	St. John's	21–11	3–3	T–3rd	NCAA Division I Elite Eight
St. John's Redmen (Big East Conference) (1979–1992)
1979–80	St. John's	24–5	5–1	T–1st	NCAA Division I second round
1980–81	St. John's	17–11	8–6	T–3rd	NIT first round
1981–82	St. John's	21–9	9–5	3rd	NCAA Division I second round
1982–83	St. John's	28–5	12–4	T–1st	NCAA Division I Sweet 16
1983–84	St. John's	18–12	8–8	T–4th	NCAA Division I first round
1984–85	St. John's	31–4	15–1	1st	NCAA Division I Final Four
1985–86	St. John's	31–5	14–2	T–1st	NCAA Division I second round
1986–87	St. John's	21–9	10–6	T–5th	NCAA Division I second round
1987–88	St. John's	17–12	8–8	T–5th	NCAA Division I first round
1988–89	St. John's	20–13	6–10	T–7th	NIT champion
1989–90	St. John's	24–10	10–6	4th	NCAA Division I second round
1990–91	St. John's	23–9	10–6	2nd	NCAA Division I Elite Eight
1991–92	St. John's	19–11	12–6	T–1st	NCAA Division I first round
St. John's:		526–200 (.725)	138–75 (.648)		
Total:		526–200 (.725)			
National champion Postseason invitational champion Conference regular season champion Conference regular season and conference tournament champion Division regular season champion Division regular season and conference tournament champion Conference tournament champion

=== ABA ===
Legend
Regular season	G	Games coached	W	Games won	L	Games lost	W–L %	Win–loss %
Playoffs	PG	Playoff games	PW	Playoff wins	PL	Playoff losses	PW–L %	Playoff win–loss %

Team	Year	G	W	L	W–L%	Finish	PG	PW	PL	PW–L%	Result
NYN	1970–71	84	40	44	.476	3rd in Eastern	6	2	4	.333	Lost in ABA Division semifinals
NYN	1971–72	84	44	40	.524	3rd in Eastern	19	10	9	.526	Lost in ABA Finals
NYN	1972–73	84	30	54	.357	4th in Eastern	5	1	4	.200	Lost in ABA Division semifinals
Career		252	114	138	.452		30	13	17	.433	

== See also ==
- List of NCAA Division I men's basketball tournament Final Four appearances by coach
