= Luke Walton =

American basketball coach and player (born 1980)

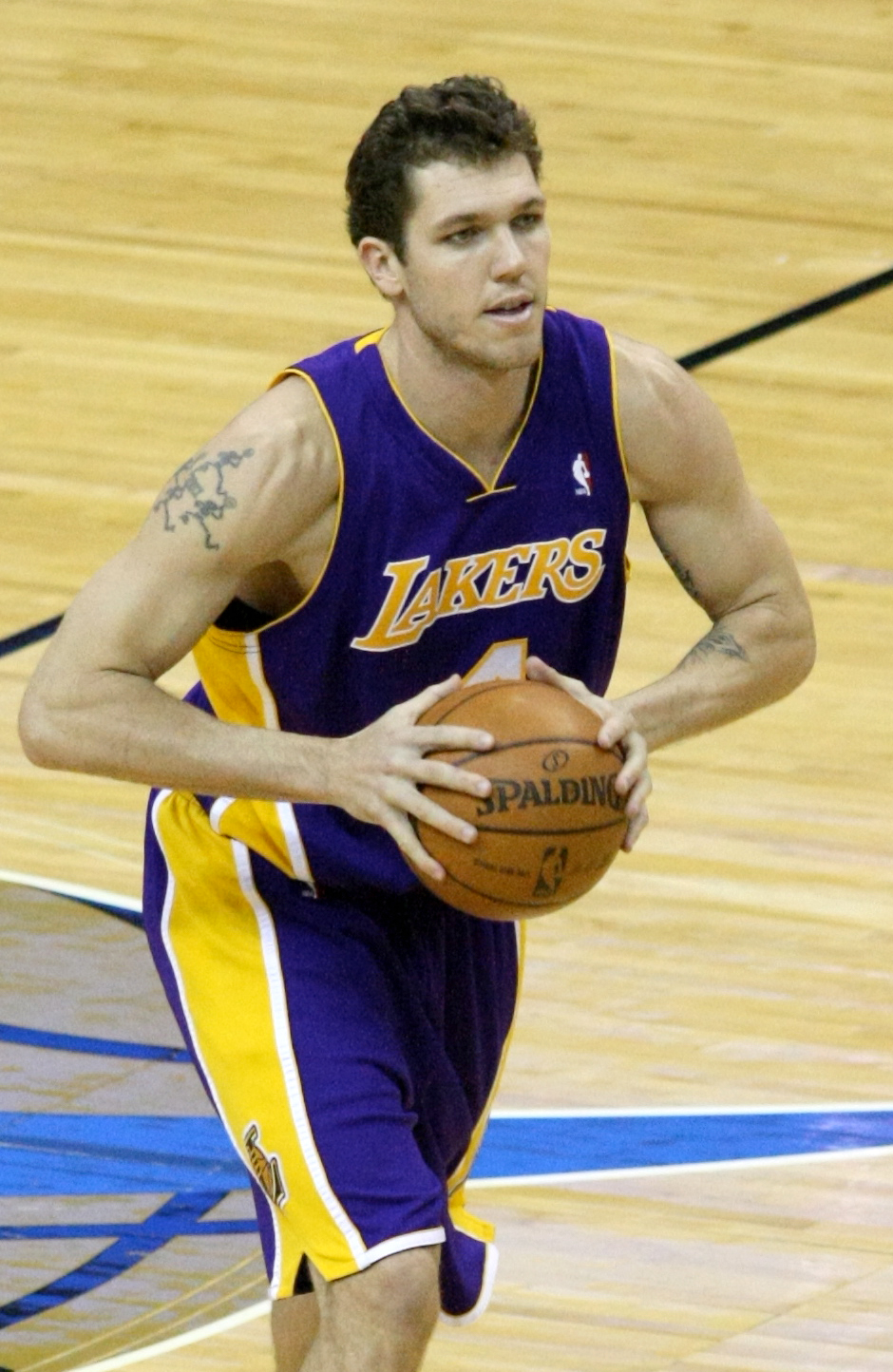
- Walton with the Los Angeles Lakers in 2008

Detroit Pistons
- Title: Assistant coach
- League: NBA

Personal information
- Born: March 28, 1980 (age 46) San Diego, California, U.S.
- Listed height: 6 ft 8 in (2.03 m)
- Listed weight: 235 lb (107 kg)

Career information
- High school: University of San Diego HS (San Diego, California)
- College: Arizona (1999–2003)
- NBA draft: 2003: 2nd round, 32nd overall pick
- Drafted by: Los Angeles Lakers
- Playing career: 2003–2013
- Position: Small forward / power forward
- Number: 4, 32
- Coaching career: 2011–present

Career history

Playing
- 2003–2012: Los Angeles Lakers
- 2012–2013: Cleveland Cavaliers

Coaching
- 2011: Memphis Tigers (assistant)
- 2013–2014: Los Angeles D-Fenders (player development)
- 2014–2016: Golden State Warriors (assistant)
- 2016–2019: Los Angeles Lakers
- 2019–2021: Sacramento Kings
- 2022–2024: Cleveland Cavaliers (assistant)
- 2024–present: Detroit Pistons (lead assistant)

Career highlights
- As player: 2× NBA champion (2009, 2010); Second-team All-American – SN (2002); 2× First-team All-Pac-10 (2002, 2003); Pac-10 tournament MVP (2002); As assistant coach: NBA champion (2015)

Career NBA statistics
- Points: 2,649 (4.7 ppg)
- Rebounds: 1,588 (2.8 rpg)
- Assists: 1,317 (2.3 apg)
- Stats at NBA.com
- Stats at Basketball Reference

Luke Theodore Walton (born March 28, 1980) is an American professional basketball coach and former player who is the lead assistant coach for the Detroit Pistons of the National Basketball Association (NBA). He played 10 seasons in the NBA as a forward, winning two NBA championships with the Los Angeles Lakers. He also won a title as an assistant coach with the Golden State Warriors before serving as the head coach of the Lakers from 2016 through 2019. Additionally, Walton served as the head coach of the Sacramento Kings from 2019 to 2021.

Walton played college basketball with the Arizona Wildcats. He was a second-team All-American and a two-time first-team all-conference selection in the Pac-10. He was selected in the second round of the 2003 NBA draft by the Lakers. After the 2010 NBA Finals, Walton and his father, Hall of Famer Bill Walton, became the first father and son to have both won multiple NBA championships: Bill won in 1977 and 1986, and Luke in 2009 and 2010. His best season statistically was 2006–07 with over 11 points, 5 rebounds, and over 4 assists per game.

As the Warriors' interim head coach in 2015–16, he guided the team to the longest winning streak to open a season in league history at 24 games.

== Early life ==
The son of Susie and former UCLA star and NBA Hall-of-Famer Bill Walton, Luke Walton was born in San Diego, California. He was named after his father's close friend and former Portland Trail Blazers teammate Maurice "Luke" Lucas. He has three brothers: Adam, Nathan, and Chris. Walton attended University of San Diego High School in San Diego, California, graduating in 1998.

== College career ==
Walton played basketball at the University of Arizona under coach Lute Olson. A two-time first-team All-Pac-10 selection, his best year statistically was as a junior, when he averaged 15.7 points, 7.3 rebounds, 6.3 assists, 1.6 steals and 0.6 blocks per game. During his senior year he averaged 10.8 points, 5.6 rebounds, 5.1 assists and 0.9 steals per game.

Walton graduated from Arizona in the spring of 2003 after completing work in family studies and human development.

== Professional career ==
=== Los Angeles Lakers (2003–2012) ===
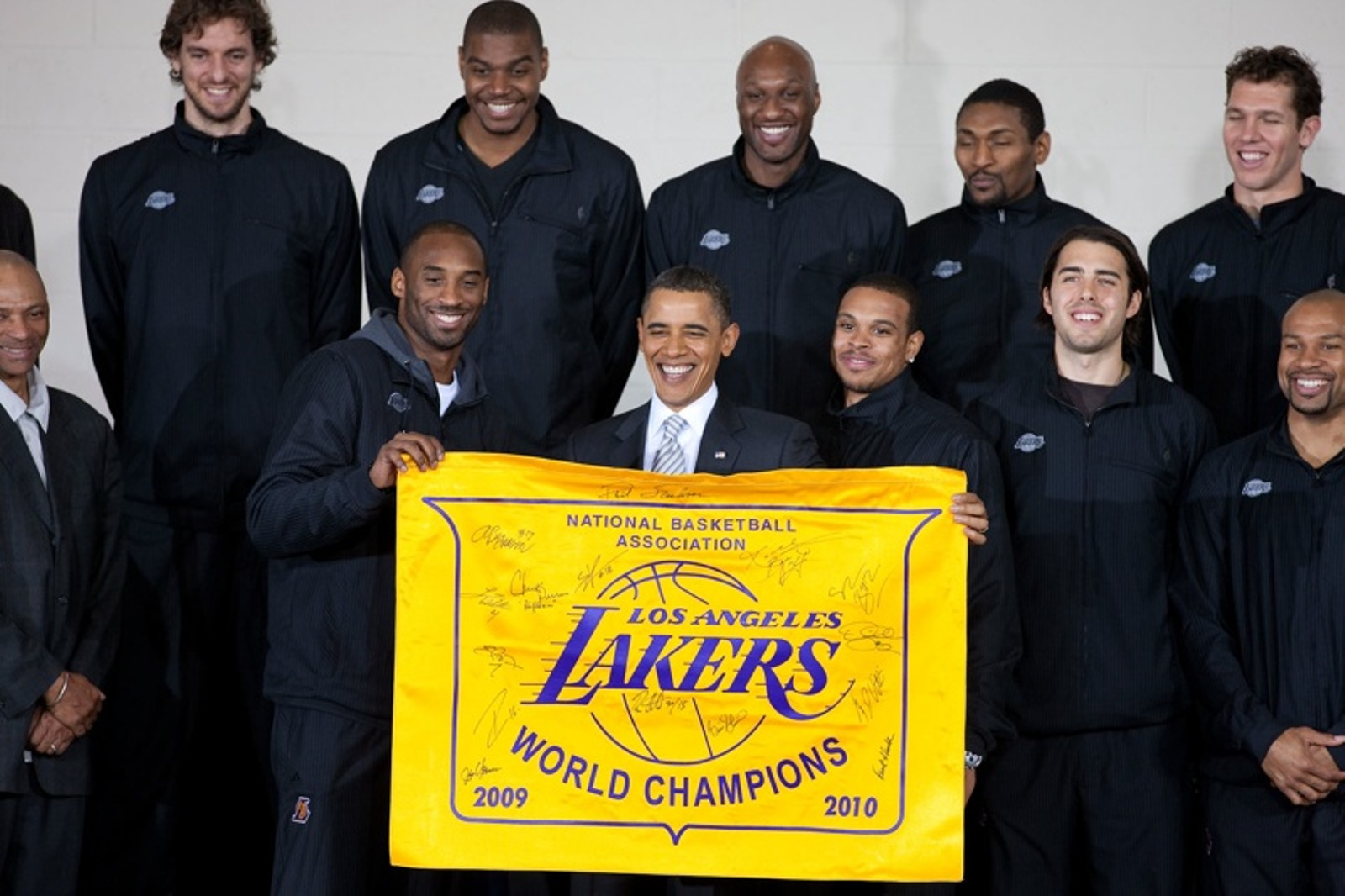
Walton (upper row, far right) during an event with Barack Obama to celebrate the Lakers' 2010 championship

Walton was selected by the Los Angeles Lakers in the 2003 NBA draft with the second pick of the second round (32nd overall). Walton was a favorite of Lakers fans during his nine-year stint and earned a reputation as a selfless, hard-working reserve player. He was chosen to represent Team Los Angeles in the Shooting Stars Competition during All-Star Weekend in 2005.

In 2006–07, Walton had his best year in the NBA. He scored a career-high 25 points against the Atlanta Hawks on December 8, 2006. For the season he posted career-high per-game averages in minutes, field goal percentage, steals, blocks, rebounds, assists and points as the Lakers starting small forward. Following the season, on July 12, 2007, Walton was signed by the Lakers to a 6-year, $30 million contract. The Lakers then made three straight runs to the NBA Finals; they lost to the Celtics in 2008, but defeated the Magic in 2009 and Celtics in 2010 to win back-to-back championships. This gave Walton two championships as a player, the same number his father won.

=== Cleveland Cavaliers (2012–2013) ===
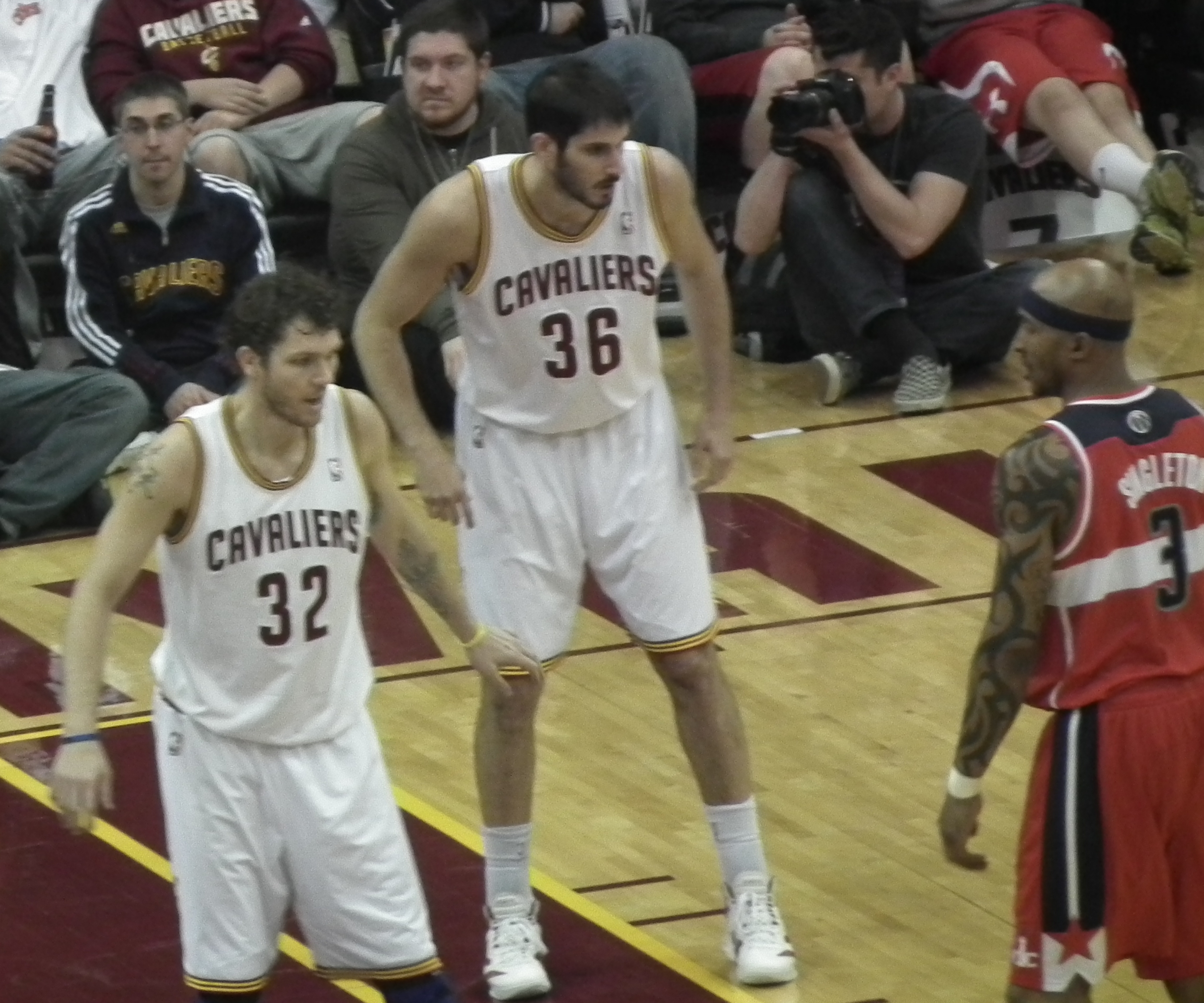
Walton (left) during his stint with the Cleveland Cavaliers in 2012

On March 15, 2012, Walton was traded along with Jason Kapono and a 2012 first-round draft choice to the Cleveland Cavaliers for Ramon Sessions and Christian Eyenga.

2012-13 was Walton's last season as an NBA player. His final game was on April 5, 2013, in a 97–91 victory over the Boston Celtics; he finished the game with 2 assists in 3 minutes of playing time.

== Coaching career ==
=== Early coaching career ===
Walton's first coaching experience was with the University of Memphis, which hired Walton as an assistant coach during the 2011 NBA lockout. He remained an assistant at Memphis until the lockout was over.

Following his retirement Walton was hired as a player development coach by the Los Angeles D-Fenders of the NBA Development League, joining the team in November 2013 for the 2013–14 season.

=== Golden State Warriors (2014–2016) ===
The following season in 2014–15, Walton became an assistant coach for the Golden State Warriors. Said Walton, "We are gonna run parts of the triangle offense, and I know that thing front and back." The Warriors won the 2015 NBA Finals after they defeated the Cleveland Cavaliers in six games to give Walton his third NBA championship and first as a coach.

During 2015–16 training camp in October 2015, Walton was appointed as the Warriors interim head coach when Steve Kerr took an indefinite leave of absence to rehabilitate his back that had been bothering him after the NBA Finals. Walton made his coaching debut in the season opener on October 27 in a 111–95 win over the New Orleans Pelicans. Three games later, he presided over the third-largest margin of victory in franchise history when the Warriors defeated the Memphis Grizzlies, 119–69, which was also the largest margin in the league since 1991. The Warriors set a new NBA record by winning their first four games by a total margin of 100 points. With a win over the Los Angeles Lakers on November 24, he guided the Warriors to a 16th consecutive victory to start the season, a new NBA record.

Walton was named the NBA Western Conference Coach of the Month for games played in October and November, after guiding Golden State to a 19–0 start. He received the award despite technically being winless, since the Warriors' record was credited to Kerr. Since Kerr was still the head coach, NBA rules stipulated that the team's record under an interim coach be credited to the head coach, though the league considered altering the rule given Walton's case. However, the NBA permits an interim or acting head coach to be eligible for coaching awards. The Warriors extended their record start to 24–0. They were 39–4, the second-best start in league history, when Kerr resumed coaching full-time on January 22, 2016. Golden State ended the season an NBA-record 73–9, and Kerr was voted the NBA Coach of the Year. The coach had Walton, who coached more games during the season than Kerr (43–39), sit next to him on the podium at the award press conference. Walton finished ninth in the voting, receiving one second-place and two third-place votes.

=== Los Angeles Lakers (2016–2019) ===
On April 29, 2016, the Lakers hired Walton to become their new head coach once the Warriors' season ended in the 2016 NBA Finals. He replaced Byron Scott.

In his first season with the Lakers, the team improved upon their franchise worst 17–65 record from the previous year, finishing 26–56. During the season, Mitch Kupchak and Jim Buss were replaced by Magic Johnson and Rob Pelinka. Johnson and Pelinka both spoke highly of Walton and said he would remain the head coach of the team. The Lakers won five of their last six games of the season, bringing some momentum into the off-season.

Walton's second season with the Lakers saw another slight improvement, as the team finished 35–47, its best record since the 2012–13 season.

In 2018–19, the Lakers had high expectations after signing LeBron James to a four-year, $153.3 million contract. Along with James and a core of young prospects, the front office completed the roster with veterans on one-year deals, a group that was rich in ball handlers but lacking in shooters. Johnson initially preached patience during the preseason. After the team started the season 2–5, Johnson reprimanded Walton and demanded immediate results. The Lakers were 20–14 after a Christmas win over Golden State, but James and Rajon Rondo were injured during the game, which began a downturn from which the team never recovered, ending the season 37–45. Combined with season-ending injuries to Lonzo Ball and Brandon Ingram, the combination of James, Ball and Ingram played together for just 23 games, when they were 15–8. As a team, Lakers players missed over 210 games due to injuries, and Walton used more than 25 different starting lineups during the season. Prior to the season finale, Johnson resigned, citing among his reasons that he wished to avoid conflict with owner Jeanie Buss, who supported Walton, while Johnson planned to fire him. Days later on April 12, 2019, Walton and the Lakers agreed to mutually part ways. The Lakers went 98–148 under Walton and missed the playoffs in all three seasons.

=== Sacramento Kings (2019–2021) ===
On April 14, 2019, Walton was hired by the Sacramento Kings as their head coach. He and Kings general manager Vlade Divac had been teammates with the Lakers in 2004–05, which was Divac's final NBA season after spending six with Sacramento. The Kings began the 2019–20 season 0–5 after losing forward Marvin Bagley III for weeks when he suffered a broken thumb in the closing minutes of a 29-point, season-opening loss to the Phoenix Suns. Sacramento rebounded from their slow start to win six of their next eight. They ended the season 31–41, and Divac resigned after the season. The Kings finished 31–41 again in 2020–21, extending the franchise's playoff drought to 15 seasons, which was the longest active streak in the league. On November 21, 2021, the Kings fired Walton after a 6–11 start to the 2021–22 season. He was 68–93 in his two-plus seasons with the team.

=== Cleveland Cavaliers (2022–2024) ===
On May 31, 2022, the Cleveland Cavaliers hired Walton as an assistant coach to serve under J. B. Bickerstaff.

=== Detroit Pistons (2024–present) ===
On July 12, 2024, the Detroit Pistons hired Walton as the lead assistant coach to stay with J. B. Bickerstaff.

== Broadcasting career ==
Walton was hired by Spectrum SportsNet (known then as Time Warner Cable SportsNet) in 2013 to join their Lakers on-air broadcast team.

== Personal life ==
In December 2008, a woman named Stacy Elizabeth Beshear pleaded no contest to charges of stalking Walton. At one point, she pulled up to Walton's car and "pretended to fire gunshots at him with her hand." She was sentenced to three years' probation, told to attend weekly counseling sessions for a year and ordered to stay away for three years from Walton's home and from Lakers' games and practices.

In 2009, Walton and his father became the third father-son duo to both win NBA championships as players, following the Guokases (Matt Sr. and Matt Jr.) and the Barrys (Rick and Brent). The Waltons later became the first father-son duo to each win multiple NBA titles.

Walton married long-time girlfriend Bre Ladd in 2013. The two met in 2002 at the University of Arizona, where she played volleyball on their varsity team, and started dating in 2005. They have two children.

On April 22, 2019, former Spectrum SportsNet host Kelli Tennant filed a civil lawsuit against Walton, accusing him of sexual assault. They had appeared on the network together during Walton's brief broadcasting stint. She published a book in 2014, which credits him as being the author of the foreword, which he later denied writing. She alleged that the assault occurred afterwards, when she dropped off a copy of the book to Walton in a hotel in Santa Monica, California, while he was an assistant with Golden State. According to Tennant, he invited her to his room, where he pinned her on the bed. He kissed her face, neck, and chest and groped her breasts and groin area. She said he later rubbed his erection against her leg. Walton denied the charges; he acknowledged their meeting at the hotel, but wrote in court filings that "their encounter was very short, entirely pleasant and consensual." The Kings and the NBA launched a joint investigation into her claims against Walton. In August, the investigators concluded that there was "not a sufficient basis to support" the accusations. Tennant declined to participate in the investigation. On December 5, the lawsuit was dropped at her request, with records showing it was dismissed "with prejudice", meaning she cannot re-file. It was not known whether a settlement was reached.

== NBA career statistics ==
Legend
GP	Games played	GS	Games started	MPG	Minutes per game
FG%	Field goal percentage	3P%	3-point field goal percentage	FT%	Free throw percentage
RPG	Rebounds per game	APG	Assists per game	SPG	Steals per game
BPG	Blocks per game	PPG	Points per game	**Bold**	Career high
†	Won an NBA championship

=== Regular season ===
Year	Team	GP	GS	MPG	FG%	3P%	FT%	RPG	APG	SPG	BPG	PPG
2003–04	L.A. Lakers	72	2	10.1	.425	.333	.705	1.8	1.6	.4	.1	2.4
2004–05	L.A. Lakers	61	5	12.6	.411	.262	.708	2.3	1.5	.4	.2	3.2
2005–06	L.A. Lakers	69	6	19.3	.412	.327	**.750**	3.6	2.3	.6	.2	5.0
2006–07	L.A. Lakers	60	**60**	**33.0**	**.474**	.387	.745	**5.0**	**4.3**	**1.0**	**.4**	**11.4**
2007–08	L.A. Lakers	**74**	31	23.4	.450	.333	.706	3.9	2.9	.8	.2	7.2
2008–09†	L.A. Lakers	65	34	17.9	.436	.298	.719	2.8	2.7	.5	.2	5.0
2009–10†	L.A. Lakers	29	0	9.4	.357	.412	.500	1.3	1.4	.3	.0	2.4
2010–11	L.A. Lakers	54	0	9.0	.328	.235	.700	1.2	1.1	.2	.1	1.7
2011–12	L.A. Lakers	9	0	7.2	.429	.000	.000	1.6	.6	.2	.0	1.3
2011–12	Cleveland	21	0	14.2	.353	**.438**	.000	1.7	1.4	.1	.0	2.0
2012–13	Cleveland	50	0	17.1	.392	.299	.500	2.9	3.3	.8	.3	3.4
Career		564	138	17.2	.429	.326	.715	2.8	2.3	.6	.2	4.7

=== Playoffs ===
Year	Team	GP	GS	MPG	FG%	3P%	FT%	RPG	APG	SPG	BPG	PPG
2004	L.A. Lakers	17	0	7.9	.345	.385	.700	1.3	1.5	.4	.1	1.9
2006	L.A. Lakers	7	**7**	**33.6**	**.458**	.364	**1.000**	**6.4**	1.7	1.0	.1	**12.1**
2007	L.A. Lakers	5	5	25.6	.389	.417	.750	4.2	**2.6**	**1.4**	**.2**	7.2
2008	L.A. Lakers	**21**	0	16.8	.454	**.423**	.722	2.6	2.0	.5	**.2**	6.0
2009†	L.A. Lakers	**21**	0	15.8	.427	.313	.611	2.5	2.1	.7	.1	3.8
2010†	L.A. Lakers	16	0	6.0	.304	.222	.500	.5	.9	.1	.1	1.1
2011	L.A. Lakers	1	0	4.0	.000	.000	.000	1.0	.0	.0	.0	.0
Career		88	12	14.6	.420	.360	.701	2.3	1.7	.5	.1	4.3

== Head coaching record ==
Legend
Regular season	G	Games coached	W	Games won	L	Games lost	W–L %	Win–loss %
Playoffs	PG	Playoff games	PW	Playoff wins	PL	Playoff losses	PW–L %	Playoff win–loss %

Team	Year	G	W	L	W–L%	Finish	PG	PW	PL	PW–L%	Result
L.A. Lakers	2016–17	82	26	56	.317	4th in Pacific	—	—	—	—	Missed playoffs
L.A. Lakers	2017–18	82	35	47	.427	3rd in Pacific	—	—	—	—	Missed playoffs
L.A. Lakers	2018–19	82	37	45	.451	4th in Pacific	—	—	—	—	Missed playoffs
Sacramento	2019–20	72	31	41	.431	4th in Pacific	—	—	—	—	Missed playoffs
Sacramento	2020–21	72	31	41	.431	5th in Pacific	—	—	—	—	Missed playoffs
Sacramento	2021–22	17	6	11	.353	(fired)	—	—	—	—	—
Career		407	166	241	.408		—	—	—	—	
