= Jon Barry =

American basketball player (born 1969)

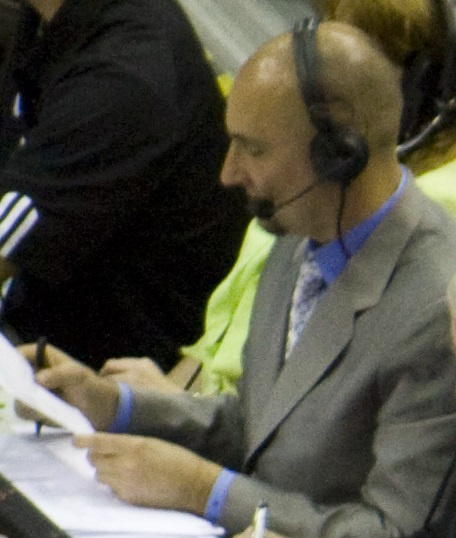
- Barry working for ESPN's NBA Wednesday in 2010

Personal information
- Born: July 25, 1969 (age 57) Oakland, California, U.S.
- Listed height: 6 ft 4 in (1.93 m)
- Listed weight: 195 lb (88 kg)

Career information
- High school: De La Salle (Concord, California)
- College: Pacific (1987–1988); Paris JC (1989–1990); Georgia Tech (1990–1992)
- NBA draft: 1992: 1st round, 21st overall pick
- Drafted by: Boston Celtics
- Playing career: 1992–2006
- Position: Shooting guard
- Number: 17, 20

Career history
- 1992–1995: Milwaukee Bucks
- 1995–1996: Golden State Warriors
- 1996–1997: Atlanta Hawks
- 1997–1998: Los Angeles Lakers
- 1999–2001: Sacramento Kings
- 2001–2003: Detroit Pistons
- 2003–2004: Denver Nuggets
- 2004: Atlanta Hawks
- 2004–2006: Houston Rockets

Career highlights
- Third-team All-ACC (1992)

Career NBA statistics
- Points: 4,715 (5.7 ppg)
- Rebounds: 1,513 (1.8 rpg)
- Assists: 1,784 (2.2 apg)
- Stats at NBA.com
- Stats at Basketball Reference

Jon Alan Barry (born July 25, 1969) is an American former professional basketball player and television analyst for ABC and ESPN. Barry is currently the lead analyst for ESPN Radio's coverage of the NBA.

== Biography ==
Barry is the son of Hall of Famer Rick Barry and Pam Connolly, and has three brothers: Scooter, Brent, and Drew, all of whom are also basketball players. In 1979, his father left the family; his parents divorced the following year when Jon was eleven. Jon played his high school basketball at De La Salle High School in Concord, California. He then played one year each at University of the Pacific and Paris Junior College, before receiving a basketball scholarship to attend Georgia Tech in Atlanta, Georgia.

Out of Georgia Tech, he was selected in the first round of the 1992 NBA draft by the Boston Celtics, but refused to sign a contract and sat out the season. The Celtics traded their rights to him, mid season, to the Milwaukee Bucks for Alaa Abdelnaby. Barry joined the Milwaukee Bucks, who finished last, tied for last, and 2nd to last in their division Barry's first three years in the NBA.

Off to a slow start of a career as primarily a backup player, Barry did get chances to contribute to playoff runs of some good teams (scored 739 points in 82 appearances with the 2001–2002 Central Division champion Detroit Pistons) and scored 326 career playoff points in 63 NBA playoff games over 14 seasons. He had two games with 5 three-point shots and had six games with 5 steals, and has 5,041 season and playoff points total.

In addition to the Milwaukee Bucks and Detroit Pistons, Jon played for the Atlanta Hawks, Los Angeles Lakers, Golden State Warriors, Sacramento Kings, Denver Nuggets and most recently the Houston Rockets. Barry had 12 first-half points in a 3-minute span in the deciding game 5 of the first round of the 2002 NBA playoffs in the Detroit Pistons' series against the Toronto Raptors. Barry left the Pistons after the 2002–03 season, and was also released from the Rockets on March 1, 2006, which marked the end of his NBA playing career.

== NBA career statistics ==
Legend
GP	Games played	GS	Games started	MPG	Minutes per game
FG%	Field goal percentage	3P%	3-point field goal percentage	FT%	Free throw percentage
RPG	Rebounds per game	APG	Assists per game	SPG	Steals per game
BPG	Blocks per game	PPG	Points per game	**Bold**	Career high

=== Regular season ===
Year	Team	GP	GS	MPG	FG%	3P%	FT%	RPG	APG	SPG	BPG	PPG
1992–93	Milwaukee	47	0	11.7	.369	.333	.673	0.9	1.4	0.7	0.1	4.4
1993–94	Milwaukee	72	7	17.3	.414	.278	.795	2.0	2.3	**1.4**	**0.2**	6.2
1994–95	Milwaukee	52	0	11.6	.425	.333	.763	0.9	1.6	0.6	0.1	3.7
1995–96	Golden State	68	0	10.5	**.492**	**.473**	.838	0.9	1.3	0.5	**0.2**	3.8
1996–97	Atlanta	58	8	16.6	.407	.387	.804	1.7	2.0	0.9	0.1	4.9
1997–98	Los Angeles	49	1	7.6	.365	.295	**.931**	0.8	1.0	0.5	0.1	2.5
1998–99	Sacramento	43	0	17.1	.428	.304	.845	2.2	2.6	1.2	0.1	5.0
1999–00	Sacramento	62	1	20.7	.465	.429	.922	2.6	2.4	1.2	0.1	8.0
2000–01	Sacramento	62	2	16.3	.404	.348	.877	1.5	2.1	0.5	0.1	5.1
2001–02	Detroit	**82**	6	**24.2**	.489	.469	**.931**	**2.9**	**3.3**	1.1	**0.2**	**9.0**
2002–03	Detroit	80	0	18.4	.450	.407	.860	2.3	2.6	0.8	**0.2**	6.9
2003–04	Denver	57	**9**	19.3	.404	.370	.845	2.2	2.6	1.0	0.1	6.2
2004–05	Atlanta	16	0	17.2	.403	.344	.769	1.3	1.8	0.9	0.1	5.2
2004–05	Houston	53	2	23.2	.447	.451	.897	2.6	2.6	0.9	0.1	7.0
2005–06	Houston	20	0	17.1	.385	.375	.828	1.6	1.3	0.7	0.1	4.3
Career		821	36	16.9	.434	.392	.848	1.8	2.2	0.9	0.1	5.7

=== Playoffs ===
Year	Team	GP	GS	MPG	FG%	3P%	FT%	RPG	APG	SPG	BPG	PPG
1996–97	Atlanta	2	0	4.5	.000	.000	.000	0.0	0.0	0.0	0.0	0.0
1997–98	Los Angeles	7	0	2.6	.000	.000	.000	0.3	0.0	0.1	0.0	0.0
1998–99	Sacramento	5	0	22.4	.353	.263	.917	2.0	1.8	**1.2**	**0.2**	8.0
1999–00	Sacramento	5	0	20.4	.429	**.583**	.875	2.4	**2.4**	0.6	0.0	7.8
2000–01	Sacramento	7	0	7.9	.412	.286	.000	0.4	0.6	0.1	0.0	2.3
2001–02	Detroit	10	0	17.7	**.475**	.447	.625	2.0	2.1	0.5	0.1	8.0
2002–03	Detroit	**14**	0	12.3	.426	.455	**1.000**	1.7	1.4	0.6	0.1	5.0
2003–04	Denver	5	**1**	20.0	.333	.333	.667	3.6	2.0	0.6	0.0	4.2
2004–05	Houston	7	0	**26.1**	.438	.478	.875	**4.1**	1.3	0.7	0.0	**8.6**
Career		62	1	15.0	.404	.403	.857	1.9	1.4	0.5	0.0	5.3

== See also ==
- List of second-generation NBA players
