= New Jersey-New York 7 Conference =

Former NCAA division from 1976 to 1980

- Association: NCAA
- Founded: 1976
- Folded: 1980
- Division: Division I
- No. of teams: 7

Locations
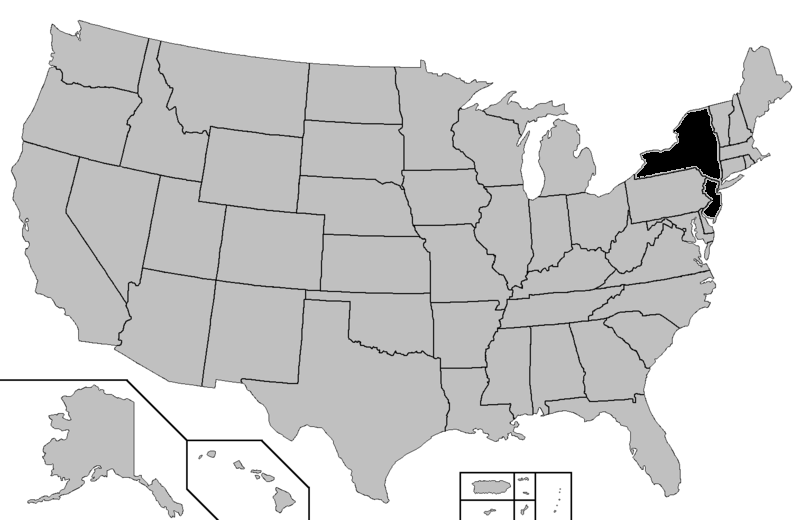

The New York-New Jersey 7 was an informal basketball association in the NCAA.

== History ==
The formation of the "New York-New Jersey Basketball Seven" was announced at a press conference on June 30, 1975. It was described by Rutgers athletic director Fred Gruninger as "...not a formal conference or league, but merely an association of schools agreeing to play each other on a regular basis." Rutgers head basketball coach Tom Young stated that "The main objective of a Metropolitan league is for the fans to enjoy the games even more than they have in the past. I think league competition just naturally creates more interest and it's great for basketball in this area."

Princeton and Columbia were simultaneously full members of the Ivy League and continued to play full schedules of Ivy League games while also competing in games against the other association teams.

As of March 1980, the NY-NJ 7 continued to be mentioned as an active association with teams preparing to play each other in the 1980–81 season, but references to it seem to disappear after that point.

== Membership ==
- Columbia University
- Fordham University
- Manhattan College
- Princeton University
- Rutgers University
- Seton Hall University
- St. John's University

== Champions ==
=== Men's basketball ===
- 1977 Columbia/Seton Hall
- 1978 Rutgers/St. John's (N.Y.)
- 1979 Rutgers
