= Rick Barry =

American former basketball player (born 1944)

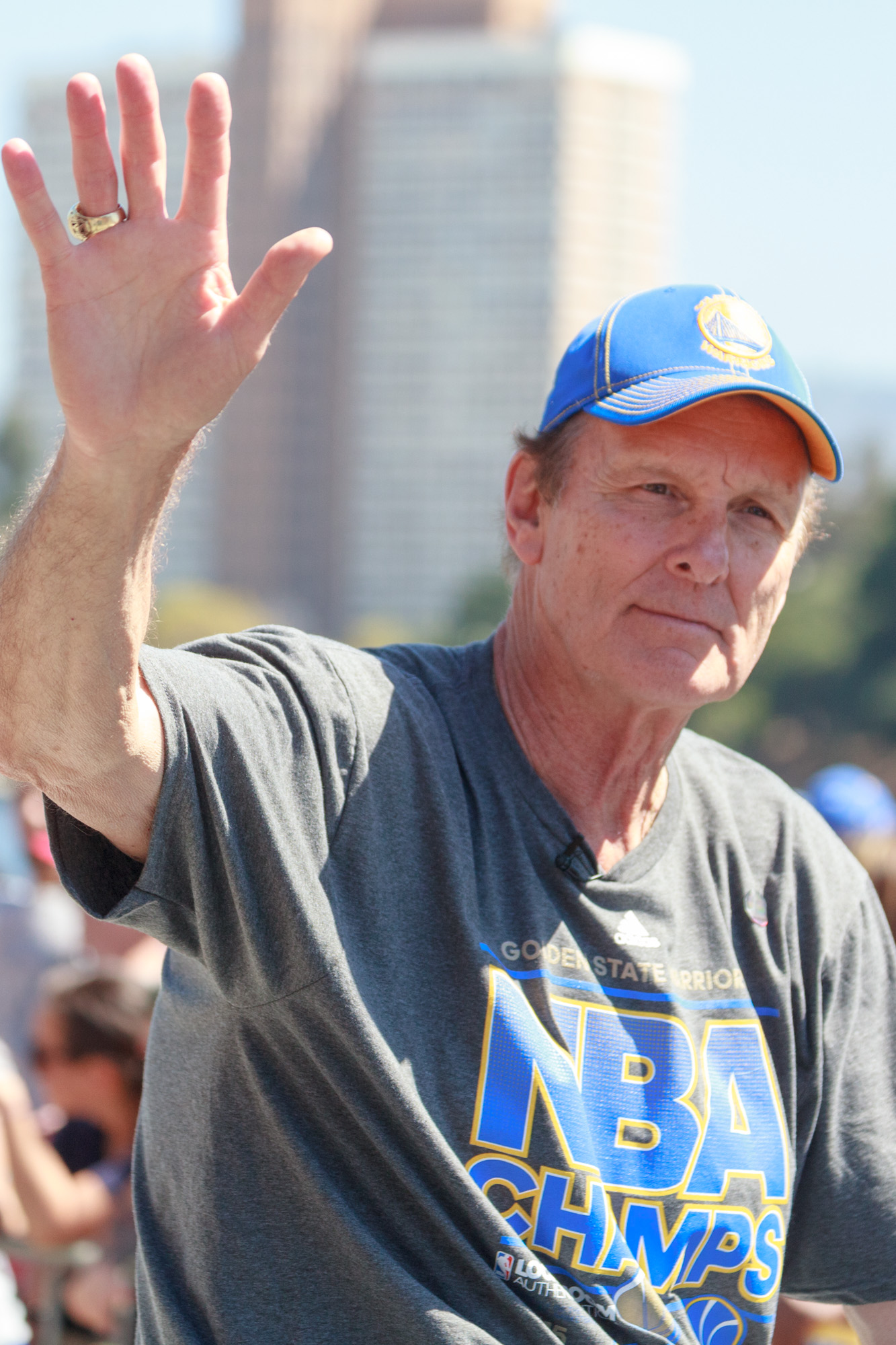
- Barry at the Golden State Warriors championship parade in June 2015

Personal information
- Born: March 28, 1944 (age 82) Elizabeth, New Jersey, U.S.
- Listed height: 6 ft 7 in (2.01 m)
- Listed weight: 205 lb (93 kg)

Career information
- High school: Roselle Park (Roselle Park, New Jersey)
- College: Miami (Florida) (1962–1965)
- NBA draft: 1965: 1st round, 2nd overall pick
- Drafted by: San Francisco Warriors
- Playing career: 1965–1980
- Position: Small forward
- Number: 24, 2, 4
- Coaching career: 1992–2000

Career history

Playing
- 1965–1967: San Francisco Warriors
- 1968–1970: Oakland Oaks / Washington Caps
- 1970–1972: New York Nets
- 1972–1978: Golden State Warriors
- 1978–1980: Houston Rockets

Career highlights
- NBA champion (1975); NBA Finals MVP (1975); ABA champion (1969); 8× NBA All-Star (1966, 1967, 1973–1978); NBA All-Star Game MVP (1967); 5× All-NBA First Team (1966, 1967, 1974–1976); All-NBA Second Team (1973); 4× ABA All-Star (1969–1972); 4× All-ABA First Team (1969–1972); NBA Rookie of the Year (1966); NBA All-Rookie First Team (1966); NBA scoring champion (1967); NBA steals leader (1975); NBA anniversary team (50th, 75th); ABA All-Time Team; No. 24 retired by Golden State Warriors; Consensus first-team All-American (1965); NCAA scoring champion (1965); No. 24 retired by Miami Hurricanes

Career ABA and NBA statistics
- Points: 25,279 (24.8 ppg)
- Rebounds: 6,863 (6.7 rpg)
- Assists: 4,952 (4.9 apg)
- Stats at NBA.com
- Stats at Basketball Reference
- Basketball Hall of Fame
- Collegiate Basketball Hall of Fame

Richard Francis Dennis Barry III (born March 28, 1944) is an American former professional basketball player. Barry ranks among the most prolific scorers and all-around players in basketball history. He is the only player to lead the National Collegiate Athletic Association (NCAA), American Basketball Association (ABA), and National Basketball Association (NBA) in points per game in a season. He ranks as the all-time ABA scoring leader in regular season (30.5 points per game) and postseason (33.5) play, while his 36.3 points per game are the most in NBA Finals history.

Barry is widely known for his unorthodox underhand free throw technique. His career .880 free throw percentage ranks No. 1 in ABA history, and his .900 percentage was the best of any NBA player at the time of his retirement in 1980. In 1987, he was inducted into the Naismith Memorial Basketball Hall of Fame. In 1996, he was named one of the 50 Greatest Players in NBA History. In October 2021, Barry was honored as one of the league's greatest players of all time by being named to the NBA 75th Anniversary Team.

Barry is the father of former professional basketball players Brent Barry, Jon Barry, Drew Barry, Scooter Barry, and Canyon Barry. His wife, Lynn Norenberg Barry, was a star basketball player at the College of William & Mary, where she became the first female athlete to have her jersey number (22) retired.

== Early life ==
Barry was born in Elizabeth, New Jersey and grew up in nearby Roselle Park, an urban middle-class community. As a fifth-grader, he played with the varsity basketball team, for which his father Aldo served as coach, however, baseball was his best sport and he was a fan of local New York Giants superstar Willie Mays, who wore jersey number 24. Barry once skipped school to shake Mays's hand at the Polo Grounds in Upper Manhattan, where the Giants played not far from his home. He wore the same number in tribute to the outfielder throughout his basketball career. In 1962, he graduated from Roselle Park High School in Roselle Park.

== College career ==
Barry fielded over 30 scholarship offers before choosing the University of Miami in Coral Gables, Florida largely because the Hurricanes adhered to an up-tempo, pro-style system under head coach Bruce Hale, which was conducive to Barry's skill set and athleticism. It was there that the three-time All-American met his future wife Pamela, who was the daughter of the head coach.

Barry averaged 19.0 points and 14.6 rebounds per game in his first season of eligibility. After those numbers made sizable jumps to 32.2 and 16.6 as a junior, he entered his final season as a consensus preseason All-America selection. Some believed that only his hair-trigger temper could prevent it. While widely lauded for his unselfishness and leadership, he had developed a reputation as something of a hothead, especially as it concerned the referees.

In December, the senior made headlines in the 1965 Hurricane Classic, in which he scored 14 of his team's final 17 points in an 80–73 defeat of Maryland in the championship game and was named Most Valuable Valuable of the tournament. Barry went on to lead the country with an average of 37.4 points per game, the third-highest mark in NCAA history at the time. Included were games of 59, 55, 54, 51 and 50 points as well as five others of 40 or more. His 475 rebounds (18.3 per game) also ranked No. 4 in the nation.

While the Hurricanes rolled to a 22–4 record, the second best win percentage in school history, Barry and his teammates were ineligible for the NCAA tournament. The basketball program was on probation for one season, which limited his national recognition and opportunity to be the first overall pick in the 1965 NBA draft.

Barry finished his college career with 2,298 points (29.8 per game) in 77 appearances, 61 in which he had 20 points or more. He still owns 15 single-game, season or career records, including most points and most rebounds. In 1976, Barry was inducted into the University of Miami Sports Hall of Fame. His number 24 jersey is one of only two to have been retired by the university.

== Professional career ==
=== San Francisco Warriors (1965–1967) ===
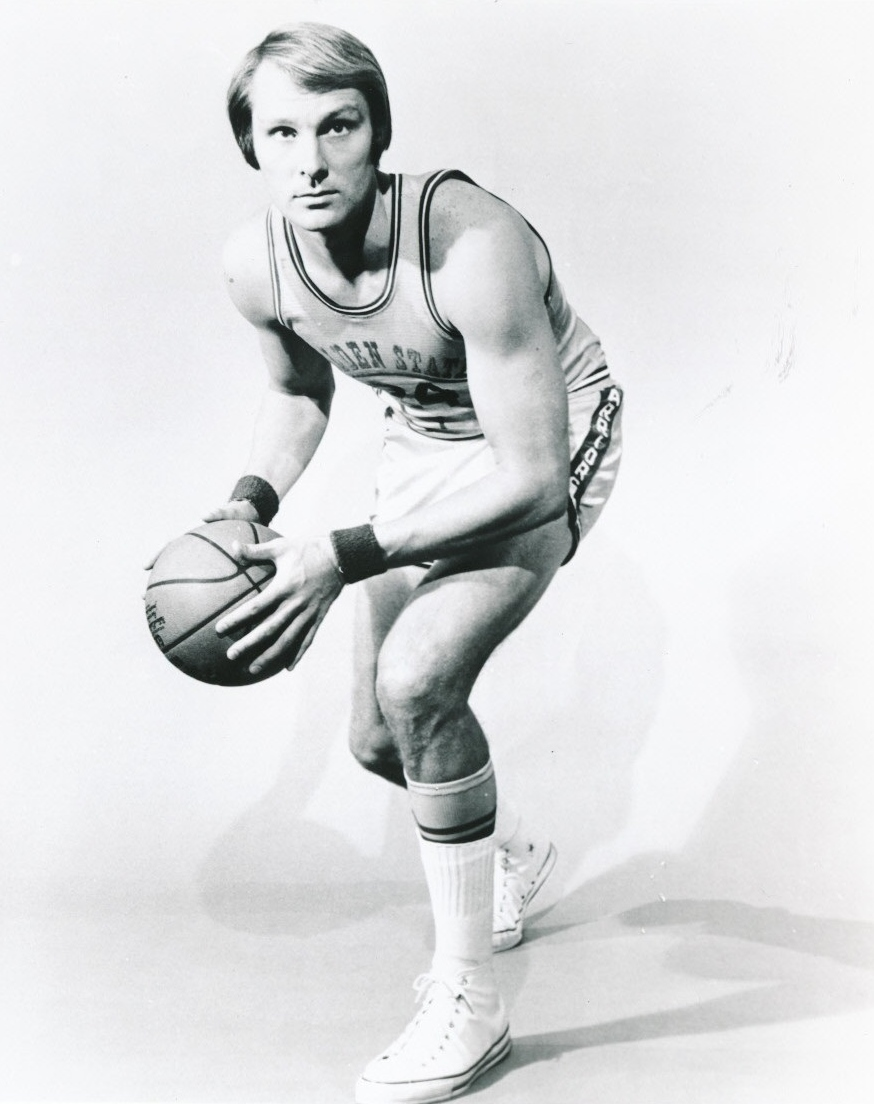
Barry's publicity photo in 1972

Barry was drafted by the San Francisco Warriors with the second pick of the NBA draft. In his pro debut, the team more than doubled its wins total from 17 to 35 and was in playoff contention until the final game of the regular season. Nicknamed the "Miami Greyhound" by longtime San Francisco Bay Area broadcaster Bill King because of his long and slender physical build, whippet-like quickness, and remarkable instincts, the 6 ft 7 in (2.01 m) Barry won the NBA Rookie of the Year Award after averaging 25.7 points and 10.6 rebounds per game in the 1965–66 season.

=== Joining the ABA (1968–1972) ===
Barry moved to the American Basketball Association's Oakland Oaks (owned by singer Pat Boone). Bruce Hale, who coached at Miami and was Barry's father-in-law, was tapped to serve as head coach. Barry signed for a salary of $75,000 along with 15 percent ownership of the Oaks and 5 percent of Oaks' gate receipts above $600,000. When asked about the deal, he stated, "I know what a lot of people think of me. They call me a traitor. Is that fair? If they would just look at it the same way they do their own businesses. This is the way I support my family. Why should I be called unloyal? They change their jobs and nobody says they're unloyal. If everything was based just on loyalty, no one would ever make any money."

The courts ordered Barry to sit out the 1967–68 season for the Oaks, upholding the validity of the reserve clause in his Warriors contract. Barry's court case preceded by two years that of St. Louis Cardinals' outfielder Curt Flood, whose own challenge to the reserve clause went all the way to the U.S. Supreme Court. Although Flood's challenge is better known, Barry was in fact the first American professional athlete to bring a court action against a major league.

==== Oakland Oaks (1968–1969) ====
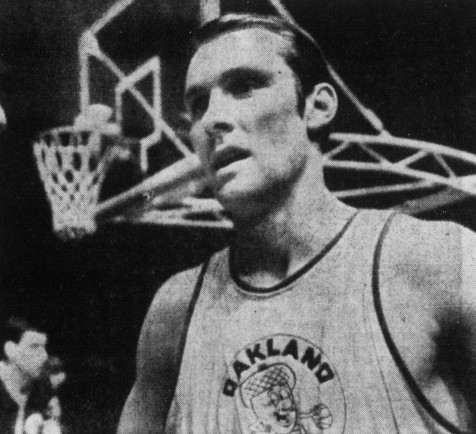
Barry before the 1969 ABA All-Star Game in Louisville, Kentucky

The Oaks finished 22–56 in their ABA debut, which Barry spent as part of their broadcast team. Prior to the 1968–69 season, they hired his former San Francisco Warriors coach Alex Hannum to replace Hale, who moved to a front office position. In his ABA debut, he averaged a league-high 34.0 points per game. Barry also paced the league in free throw percentage in the regular season, a feat he would repeat in the 1970–71 and 1971–72 seasons.

Barry had his season come to an abrupt halt on December 27, 1968, when late in a game against the New York Nets, he was blindsided by Ken Wilburn on a drive to the basket and tore left knee ligaments on the play. He attempted to come back in January 1969, only to aggravate the injury and sit out the remainder of the season. He took part in only 35 games but still was named to the ABA All-Star team.

The Oaks finished with a 60–18 record under Hannum, dominating the Western Division by 14 games over the second-place New Orleans Buccaneers. In the 1969 ABA Playoffs, the Oaks ousted the Denver Rockets in a seven-game series then swept the Buccaneers in the Western Division finals. In the championship round, they made short work of the Indiana Pacers, 4–1, to capture the league title.

==== Washington Caps (1969–1970) ====
Barry played the 1969–70 season with the ABA's Washington Caps. He missed the first 32 games before he joined the team, which played in the Western Division, making for a grueling travel schedule. The Caps still managed to finish with a respectable 44–40 record, good for third place in the Western Division. Appearing in only 52 games because of a knee injury, Barry finished the season with 1,442 points (27.7 per game), second-best in the league. The Denver Rockets edged the Caps, 4–3, in the Western Division semifinals. In Game 7 on the road, Barry went off for 52 points, which set a new ABA record for points in a playoff game (later topped a month later by Roger Brown). It is still the most points scored in a seventh and deciding game in professional basketball history.

==== New York Nets (1970–1972) ====
The Washington Caps became the Virginia Squires after the 1969–70 season, but Barry was openly despondent about playing in Virginia. At the same time, he wanted to continue playing in the ABA. Featured on the August 24, 1970, cover of Sports Illustrated in a Squires jersey, he indicated that he would not return to the NBA if the league paid him "a million dollars a year." He denounced the Squires (and, subsequently, never suited up for them), saying he did not want his kids growing up with a Southern accent. On September 1, 1970, the Squires traded Barry to the New York Nets for a draft pick and $200,000.

After the Squires dealt Barry to the New York Nets, he played in only 59 games in the 1970–71 season because of a knee injury but still made the ABA All Star team. He repeated as an ABA All Star during the 1971–72 season. During the 1970–71 season he led the league in scoring (29.4 points per game) and led the league again in 1971–72 with 31.5 points per game. In both of those years he also led the ABA in free throw percentage as he had in 1968–69. Barry also became the ABA record holder for most consecutive free throws in one game with 23.

In the 1970–71 season, the Nets finished 40–44, good for fourth place in the Eastern Division and a place in the 1971 ABA Playoffs. The Virginia Squires defeated the Nets 4 games to 2 in the Eastern Division semifinals. The 1971–72 Nets finished the season at 44–40, making the 1972 ABA Playoffs by claiming third place in the Eastern Division, 24 games behind the 68–16 Kentucky Colonels. In the Eastern Division semifinals the Nets shocked the ABA by defeating the Colonels 4 games to 2. The Nets then eked out a 4–3 game victory over the Virginia Squires in the Eastern Division finals. The Nets were then edged by the Western Division champion Indiana Pacers, 4 games to 2, in the 1972 ABA Finals.

On June 23, 1972, a United States District Court judge issued a preliminary injunction to prohibit Barry from playing for any team other than the Golden State Warriors after his contract with the Nets ended, due to a five-year contract signed in 1969. On October 6, 1972, the Nets released Barry and he returned to the Warriors.

=== Golden State Warriors (1972–1978) ===
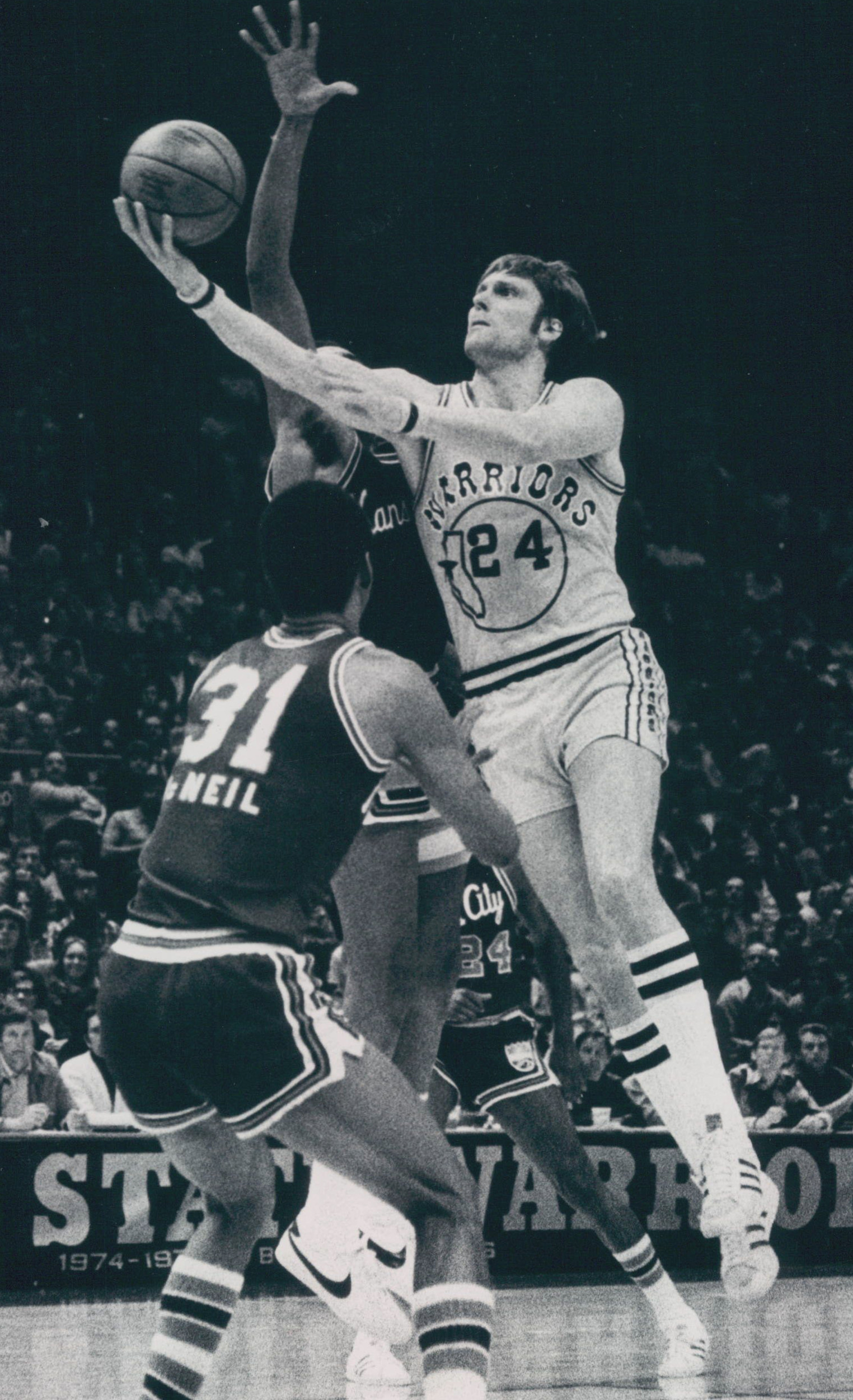
Barry with the Golden State Warriors in 1976

Upon Barry's return to the Warriors and the NBA, Barry moved his game away from the basket. On March 26, 1974, he scored a career-high 64 points and grabbed 10 rebounds in a 143–120 win over the visiting Portland Trail Blazers.

In training camp prior to the 1974–75 season, Barry was elected captain by his teammates. The Warriors went on to capture the Pacific Division crown as Barry had the best all-around season of his career. He averaged 30.6 points per game. Barry led the league in free throw percentage (.904) and steals per game (2.9) and ranked sixth in assists per game (6.2), the only forward among the top 10 in the category. In the playoffs, the upstart Warriors turned back the Seattle SuperSonics and Chicago Bulls to capture the Western Conference crown. In the 1975 NBA Finals, the Warriors faced the Washington Bullets, who were led by future Hall of Famers Elvin Hayes and Wes Unseld, winning the series in four games. Barry was named NBA Finals Most Valuable Player after averaging 29.5 points, 5.0 assists and 3.5 steals per game.

In the 1975 NBA draft, the Warriors selected point guard Gus Williams in the first round. Barry was not required to contribute as much during the 1975–76 season, and his scoring average dipped to 21.0 points per game as a result.

In the 1976–77 season, the Warriors won 46 games with Barry, Phil Smith, and Williams sharing the majority of the scoring and ball-handling responsibilities but were eliminated in the second round by the Los Angeles Lakers. Reportedly, Barry and Williams clashed over the ball-handling role, and Williams was then traded after the season to the Seattle SuperSonics.

Barry averaged 23.1 points per game in his farewell season (1977–78) with the Warriors.

=== Houston Rockets (1978–1980) ===
Barry finished his career with the Houston Rockets, playing through the 1979–80 NBA season. The Rockets signed him as a free agent in June 1978, and the league awarded veteran guard John Lucas to the Warriors as compensation. Due to Moses Malone already wearing the jersey number 24, Barry settled on an unusual arrangement wherein he would wear No. 2 at home and No. 4 on the road.

In the twilight of his career, Barry continued to make history. In his first season for the Rockets, he assumed a new role as a point forward, starting alongside Malone, Rudy Tomjanovich, Calvin Murphy, and Robert Reid. Barry finished with a career-high 502 assists to become the first true small forward to reach the 500 mark in one season. Until then, swingman John Havlicek had been the only forward with as many as 500 assists in a season, but the Boston Celtics swingman also spent considerable time at the off guard spot. Barry averaged 13.5 points per game and established a new NBA record (since broken) with a .947 free throw percentage.

Barry had a less successful final season. Early in the season, Houston's head coach Del Harris made the decision to move Barry to the bench, where he backed up Reid. The Rockets were swept by the Celtics in the 1980 Eastern Conference semifinals, and when contract talks with the Boston Celtics and Seattle SuperSonics failed to produce a contract, he decided to retire.

== Career statistics ==
=== Regular season ===
Legend
GP	Games played	GS	Games started	MPG	Minutes per game
FG%	Field goal percentage	3P%	3-point field goal percentage	FT%	Free throw percentage
RPG	Rebounds per game	APG	Assists per game	SPG	Steals per game
BPG	Blocks per game	PPG	Points per game	**Bold**	Career high
†	Won an NBA championship	*	Led the league	‡	NBA record

†	Denotes seasons in which Barry's team won an ABA championship

Year	Team	GP	GS	MPG	FG%	3P%	FT%	RPG	APG	SPG	BPG	PPG
1965–66	San Francisco (NBA)	80*	—	37.4	.439	—	.862	**10.6**	2.2	—	—	25.7
1966–67	San Francisco (NBA)	78	—	40.7	.451	—	.884	9.2	3.6	—	—	**35.6***
1968–69†	Oakland (ABA)	35	—	38.9	**.511**	.300	.888*	9.4	3.9	—	—	34.0*
1969–70	Washington (ABA)	52	—	35.6	.499	.205	.864	7.0	3.4	—	—	27.7
1970–71	New York (ABA)	59	—	42.4	.469	.221	.890	6.8	5.0	—	—	29.4
1971–72	New York (ABA)	80	—	**45.2***	.458	.308	.878	7.5	4.1	—	—	31.5
1972–73	Golden State (NBA)	**82***	—	37.5	.452	—	.902*	8.9	4.9	—	—	22.3
1973–74	Golden State (NBA)	80	—	36.5	.456	—	.899	6.8	6.1	2.1	0.5	25.1
1974–75†	Golden State (NBA)	80	—	40.4	.464	—	.904*	5.7	6.2	**2.9***	0.4	30.6
1975–76	Golden State (NBA)	81	—	38.5	.435	—	.923*	6.1	6.1	2.5	0.3	21.0
1976–77	Golden State (NBA)	79	—	36.8	.440	—	.916	5.3	6.0	2.2	**0.7**	21.8
1977–78	Golden State (NBA)	**82**	—	36.9	.451	—	.924*	5.5	5.4	1.9	0.5	23.1
1978–79	Houston (NBA)	80	—	32.1	.461	—	**.947***	3.5	**6.3**	1.2	0.5	13.5
1979–80	Houston (NBA)	72	—	25.2	.422	**.330**	.935*	3.3	3.7	1.1	0.4	12.0
Career (NBA)		794	—	36.3	.449	.330	.900	6.5	5.1	2.0	0.5	23.2
Career (ABA)		226	—	41.3	.477	.277	.880‡	7.5	4.1	—	—	30.5
Career (ABA/NBA)		1.020	—	37.4	.456	.297	.893	6.7	4.9	2.0	0.5	24.8
All-Star (NBA)		7	6	27.8	.486	—	.833	4.1	4.4	3.2‡	0.1	18.2
All-Star (ABA)		4	0	20.5	.432	—	.857	6.0	4.5	—	—	11.0
All-Star (ABA/NBA)		11	6	25.1	.473	—	.842	4.8	4.4	—	—	15.6

=== Playoffs ===
Year	Team	GP	GS	MPG	FG%	3P%	FT%	RPG	APG	SPG	BPG	PPG
1967	San Francisco (NBA)	15	—	40.9	.403	—	.809	7.5	3.9	—	—	34.7
1970	Washington (ABA)	7	—	43.1	**.532**	.333	.912	10.0	3.3	—	—	**40.1**‡
1971	New York (ABA)	6	—	**47.8**	.519	**.519**	.814	**11.7**	4.0	—	—	33.7
1972	New York (ABA)	**18**	—	41.6	.473	.377	.856	6.5	3.8	—	—	30.8
1973	Golden State (NBA)	11	—	26.5	.396	—	.909	4.9	2.2	—	—	16.4
1975†	Golden State (NBA)	17	—	42.7	.444	—	.918	5.5	6.1	**2.9**	0.9	28.2
1976	Golden State (NBA)	13	—	40.9	.436	—	.882	6.5	**6.5**	**2.9**	**1.1**	24.0
1977	Golden State (NBA)	10	—	41.5	.466	—	.909	5.9	4.7	1.7	0.7	28.4
1979	Houston (NBA)	2	—	32.5	.320	—	**1.000**	4.0	4.5	0.0	1.0	12.0
1980	Houston (NBA)	6	—	13.2	.364	.250	**1.000**	1.0	2.5	0.2	0.2	5.5
Career (NBA)		74	—	36.8	.426	.250	.875	5.6	4.6	2.2	0.8	24.8
Career (ABA)		31	—	43.2‡	.497	.412	.861	8.3	3.7	—	—	33.5‡
Career (ABA/NBA)		105	—	38.7	.448	.394	.870	6.4	4.3	—	—	27.3

== Coaching career ==
On October 30, 1992, Barry accepted an offer to become the head coach for the Cedar Rapids Sharpshooters of the Global Basketball Association (GBA). He had led the team to a 12–4 record–the best in the GBA that season–when the league folded in December 1992.

On January 25, 1993, Barry was appointed as head coach for the Fort Wayne Fury of the Continental Basketball Association (CBA). He was fired on March 8, 1994, after the Fury had a 12-game losing streak. Barry coached in the United States Basketball League (USBL) for the New Jersey ShoreCats in 1998 and 1999, and Florida Sea Dragons in 2000.

== Post-playing career ==
Barry is part owner and promoter for the Ektio basketball shoe, which doctor and former college basketball player Barry Katz designed to reduce ankle injuries. He also serves on the company's board of directors. Barry finished second in his division at the 2005 World Long Drive Championship.

== Broadcasting career ==
Barry was among the first professional basketball players to make a successful transition to the broadcasting profession. He began broadcasting during the 1967–68 season broadcasting Oakland Oaks games because of contractual matters that kept him off the court. Barry continues to work in the field, a career that began with his own radio show in San Francisco and CBS while still an active player and then with TBS.

While working as a CBS analyst during Game 5 of the 1981 NBA Finals, Barry made a controversial comment when CBS displayed an old photo of colleague Bill Russell, who is African-American. He tried to joke that "it looks like some fool over there with that big watermelon grin". Barry later apologized for the comment, claiming that he did not realize that a reference to watermelons had racial overtones. Russell said that he believed Barry with regard to Barry's racial attitudes, but nonetheless, the two men are reported not to have been particularly friendly for other reasons, unrelated to that comment.

CBS did not renew Barry's employment for the next season. Producers later cited the general negative tone of his game commentary, which did not sit well with some players and agents around the league as being the reason he was not brought back. For the next season Barry filled in on a few Seattle SuperSonics broadcasts, but a plan for a full-time position fell through when he insisted that his then-wife be allowed to join him when the team was on the road, which would have been contrary to team policy. The next year, Barry was featured in a lengthy Sports Illustrated article written by Tony Kornheiser in which he lamented the failure of his broadcasting career to that point, as well as the fact that he'd left a reputation within NBA circles for being an unlikeable person.

He hosted the pilot for the mid-1980s game show Catch Phrase; however, when the series debuted in the fall of 1985, game show veteran Art James replaced him.

In September 2001, Barry began hosting a sports talk show on KNBR in San Francisco until June 2003, when KNBR paired him up with Rod Brooks to co-host a show named Rick and Rod. The show aired on KNBR until August 2006, when Barry left the station abruptly for reasons not disclosed to the public.

== Personal life ==
Barry is of Irish, English, French, and Lithuanian descent. He is a member of Kappa Sigma fraternity. He grew up Catholic and later became a Methodist.

As of 2017, Barry lives in Colorado Springs, Colorado, with his wife, Lynn Norenberg Barry. During the time their youngest son, Canyon, played basketball for the University of Florida, they rented a condominium in Gainesville, Florida, to watch him play.

When Barry was 21, he married his first wife Pamela Hale, who was the daughter of his college coach Bruce Hale. They had four sons and a daughter: Scooter, Jon, Brent, Drew and Shannon. He left Pamela in 1979 and they divorced the following year. All of Barry's sons were professional basketball players, and for three seasons three of them played in the NBA at the same time. He is the only NBA player to have three sons also play in the NBA (Jon, Brent, and Drew). Barry wrote an autobiography, Confessions of a Basketball Gypsy: The Rick Barry Story with Bill Libby, which was published in 1972. With his third wife Lynn, to whom he has been married since 1991, he also has a son, Canyon, who is a professional player, playing for Chinese club Hunan Jinjian Miye in the 2018–19 season and later for the United States 3x3 men's basketball team.

When his son Brent won the NBA championship in 2005 with the San Antonio Spurs, Rick and Brent became the second father-son duo to both win NBA championships as players, following Matt Guokas Sr. and Matt Guokas Jr. Later, that was repeated by Bill and Luke Walton, Mychal and Klay Thompson, and Gary Payton and Gary Payton II.

Jon and Brent have also moved to broadcasting after retirement. Jon serves as a game analyst on ESPN while Brent worked as a studio and game analyst on TNT and NBA TV until 2018 when he took a job with the San Antonio Spurs to be vice president of basketball operations. Scooter won titles in the Continental Basketball Association (CBA) and in the top Belgian League.

== Career achievements ==
- Roselle Park High School – Roselle Park, New Jersey (1957–1961)
  - Two-time All-State selection
- University of Miami (1961–1965)
  - Associated Press First-Team All-America (1965)
  - The Sporting News All-America Second Team (1965)
  - Consensus All-America (1965)
  - Led the nation in scoring (37.4 ppg) as a senior
- NBA San Francisco Warriors (1965–1967)
  - NBA Rookie of the Year (1966)
  - NBA All-Rookie First Team (1966)
  - NBA leading scorer in 1967 (35.6 ppg)
  - ABA leading scorer in 1969 (34.0 ppg)
  - 6× NBA free throw percentage leader: (1973, 1975, 1976, 1978, 1979, 1980)
  - ABA highest free throw percentage 1969, 1971, 1972
  - NBA All-Star Game MVP (1967)
- ABA Oakland Oaks (1968–1969)
- ABA Washington Caps (1969–1970)
- ABA New York Nets (1970–1972)
- NBA Golden State Warriors (1972–1978)
  - All-NBA Second Team (1973)
  - NBA Finals MVP (1975)
  - NBA champion (1975)
- NBA Houston Rockets (1978–1979)
- All-NBA First Team (1966, 1967, 1974, 1975, 1976)
- Eight-time NBA All-Star (1966, 1967, 1973–1978)
- ABA All-Star First Team (1969–1972)
- NBA 50 Greatest Players (1996)
- NBA 75 Greatest Players (2021)
- Bay Area Sports Hall of Fame (1988)
- Sports Hall of Fame of New Jersey (1994)
- University of Miami Sports Hall of Fame (1976)
- Golden Plate Award of the American Academy of Achievement (1975)
- 15 games in NBA career scoring 50 or more points (5th in NBA history)
- 115 games in professional career scoring 40 or more points — 70 NBA, 45 ABA (4th in professional basketball history after Wilt Chamberlain, Michael Jordan, and Kobe Bryant)

== NBA records ==
=== Regular season ===
- Only player in history to lead the NCAA, ABA, and NBA in scoring
  - Led the NCAA in scoring in 1964–65 (973 points, 37.4 ppg)
  - Led the NBA in scoring in 1966–67 (2,775 points, 35.6 ppg)
  - Led the ABA in scoring in 1968–69 (1,190 points; 34.0 ppg)
- Youngest player to score 57 points in a game: 21 years, 261 days (57 points, San Francisco Warriors at New York Knicks, December 14, 1965)
- Free throws, consecutive, ABA game: 23, at Kentucky Colonels, February 7, 1969
- Assists, forward, game: 19, at Chicago Bulls, November 30, 1976

=== Playoffs ===
- Scoring 30 or more points in all games, any playoff series: 6 games, vs. Philadelphia 76ers, 1967 NBA Finals
- Points, 7-game ABA series: 281, vs. Denver Rockets, 1970 Semifinals
- Points scored, Game 7, any ABA-NBA playoff series: 52, at Denver Rockets, April 28, 1970
- Field goal attempts, 6-game series: 235, vs. Philadelphia 76ers, 1967 NBA Finals
- Field goal attempts, game: 48, vs. Philadelphia 76ers, April 18, 1967
- Steals, quarter: 4, second quarter, at Chicago Bulls, May 11, 1975
  - Tied with many other players

=== NBA Finals ===
- Highest scoring average (career): 36.3
- Scoring 30 or more points in all games, any championship series: 6 games, vs. Philadelphia 76ers, 1967 NBA Finals
  - Tied with Elgin Baylor, Michael Jordan, Hakeem Olajuwon, Shaquille O'Neal, and Kevin Durant.
- Field goals made, game: 22, vs. Philadelphia 76ers, April 18, 1967
  - Tied with Elgin Baylor
- Field goal attempts, 6-game series: 235, vs. Philadelphia 76ers, 1967 NBA Finals
- Field goal attempts, game: 48, vs. Philadelphia 76ers, April 18, 1967
- Field goal attempts, quarter: 17, at Philadelphia 76ers, April 14, 1967
- Steals, 4-game series: 14, vs. Washington Bullets, 1975 NBA Finals (3.5 spg)

=== NBA All-Star Game ===
- Highest steals average (career): 3.2
- Field goal attempts, game: 27 (1967)
- Steals, game: 8 (1975)
- Personal fouls, game: 6, twice (1966, 1978)
- Disqualifications, career: 2
  - Tied with Bob Cousy

== See also ==
- American Basketball Association (2000–present)
- List of NBA career free throw percentage leaders
- List of NBA annual scoring leaders
- List of NBA single-game scoring leaders
- List of NBA single-game playoff scoring leaders
- List of NBA single-game steals leaders
- List of NBA rookie single-season scoring leaders
- List of NCAA Division I men's basketball players with 2000 points and 1000 rebounds
