= Canyon Barry =

American basketball player (born 1994)

Free agent
- Position: Shooting guard

Personal information
- Born: January 7, 1994 (age 32) Fort Wayne, Indiana, U.S.
- Listed height: 6 ft 6 in (1.98 m)
- Listed weight: 215 lb (98 kg)

Career information
- High school: Cheyenne Mountain (Colorado Springs, Colorado)
- College: College of Charleston (2013–2016); Florida (2016–2017)
- NBA draft: 2017: undrafted
- Playing career: 2017–present

Career history
- 2017: Salon Vilpas Vikings
- 2017–2018: Brno
- 2018: Hunan Jinjian Rice Industry
- 2018–2022: Iowa Wolves

Career highlights
- Academic All-American of the Year (2017); SEC Sixth Man of the Year (2017)
- Stats at Basketball Reference
Medals
Men's 3x3 basketball
Representing the United States
FIBA 3x3 World Cup
Gold medal – first place	2019 Amsterdam	Team
Silver medal – second place	2023 Vienna	Team
Pan American Games
Gold medal – first place	2023 Santiago	Team

Canyon Barry (born January 7, 1994) is an American professional basketball player. Barry also represents the United States in FIBA 3x3 basketball competition. He is the son of Lynn Norenberg Barry and Rick Barry, a Basketball Hall of Fame inductee.

== College career ==
He played college basketball for three years at the College of Charleston in Charleston, South Carolina, as well as one year at the University of Florida in Gainesville, Florida. As a redshirt junior at the College of Charleston, Barry averaged a team-high 19.7 points per game. Following that season, Barry graduated from the College of Charleston Honors College with a bachelor's degree in physics. On May 9, 2016, he announced his transfer to the University of Florida as an immediately-eligible graduate transfer studying nuclear engineering. After graduating, he got a job as system engineer at L3Harris.

He is most notable for this free-throw shooting, as he shoots "granny style," a method his father popularized during his career. Barry had a .883 free throw percentage as a senior. He set a Florida Gators men's basketball school record for consecutive free throws, surpassing Taurean Green's streak of 37 on February 11, 2017. His streak ended at 42 on February 14 on a night when he posted a season-high 30 points against Auburn. He earned NCAA Division I Men's Basketball Academic All-American of the Year recognition in 2017.

== Professional career ==
After going undrafted in the 2017 NBA draft, Barry joined the New York Knicks in the NBA Summer League on June 23, 2017.

On August 16, 2017, Barry signed with Finnish club Salon Vilpas Vikings for the 2017–18 season.

On December 9, 2017, Barry signed with Brno of the Czech National Basketball League (NBL).

On October 13, 2018, Barry was signed and then waived by the Minnesota Timberwolves. He was added to the Iowa Wolves opening night roster. During the 2020–21 season, Barry averaged 12.9 points and 3.4 rebounds per game.

Barry competed at the 3x3 tournament of the 2024 Summer Olympics.
