= List of NBA career playoff blocks leaders =

This article provides two lists:

A list of National Basketball Association players by total career Playoffs blocked shots recorded.

A progressive list of blocked shots leaders showing how the record increased through the years.

== Playoff blocked shots leaders ==
This is a list of National Basketball Association players by total career Playoffs leaders in blocking shots.

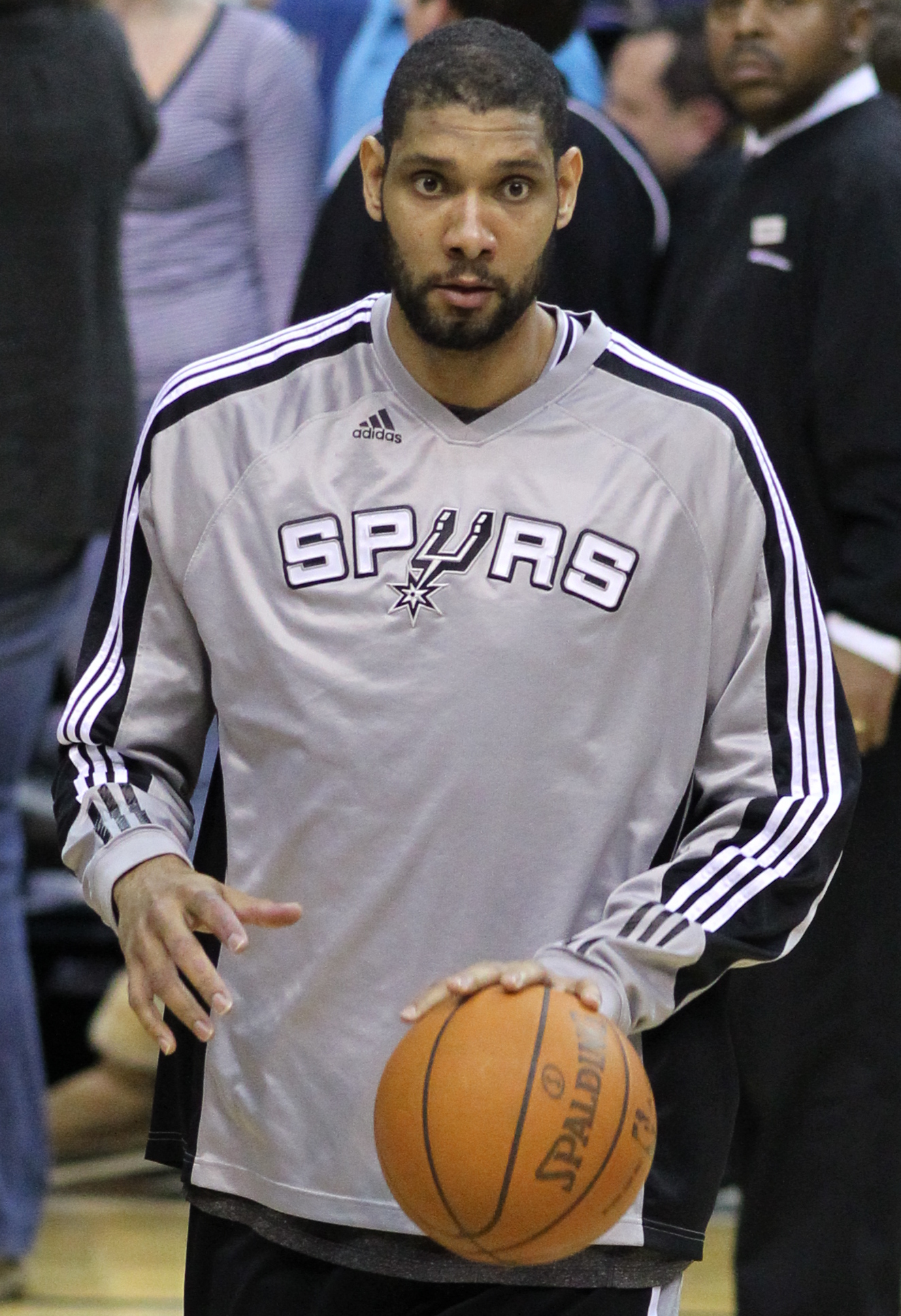
Tim Duncan has the most blocks in NBA playoffs history.

^	Active NBA player
*	Inducted into the Naismith Memorial Basketball Hall of Fame
§	Eligible for Hall of Fame in 2026

Statistics accurate as of the 2026 NBA playoffs.

Rank	Player	Position(s)	Playoff team(s) played for (years)	Total blocks	Games played	Blocks per game average
1	Tim Duncan*	PF/C	San Antonio Spurs (1998–1999, 2001–2016)	568	251	2.26
2	Kareem Abdul-Jabbar*	C	Milwaukee Bucks (1970–1973); Milwaukee Bucks (1974); Los Angeles Lakers (1977–1989)	476	196	2.43
3	Hakeem Olajuwon*	C	Houston Rockets (1985–1991, 1993–1999); Toronto Raptors (2002)	472	145	3.26
4	Shaquille O'Neal*	C	Orlando Magic (1994–1996); Los Angeles Lakers (1997–2004); Miami Heat (2005–2007); Phoenix Suns (2008); Cleveland Cavaliers (2010); Boston Celtics (2011)	459	216	2.13
5	David Robinson*	C	San Antonio Spurs (1990–1991, 1993–1996, 1998–2003)	312	123	2.54
6	Robert Parish*	C	Golden State Warriors (1977); Boston Celtics (1981–1993); Charlotte Hornets (1995); Chicago Bulls (1997)	309	184	1.68
7	Patrick Ewing*	C	New York Knicks (1988–2000); Orlando Magic (2002)	303	139	2.18
8	Serge Ibaka	PF/C	Oklahoma City Thunder (2010–2014, 2016); Toronto Raptors (2017–2020); Los Angeles Clippers (2021); Milwaukee Bucks (2022)	292	152	1.92
9	LeBron James^	SF	Cleveland Cavaliers (2006–2010, 2015–2018); Miami Heat (2011–2014); Los Angeles Lakers (2020–2021, 2023–2026)	287	302	0.95
10	Kevin McHale*	PF	Boston Celtics (1981–1993)	281	169	1.66
11	Dikembe Mutombo*	C	Denver Nuggets (1994–1995); Atlanta Hawks (1997–1999); Philadelphia 76ers (2001–2002); New Jersey Nets (2003); New York Knicks (2004); Houston Rockets (2005, 2007–2009)	251	101	2.49
12	Ben Wallace*	C	Detroit Pistons (2002–2006); Chicago Bulls (2007); Cleveland Cavaliers (2008–2009)	250	130	1.92
13	Dwight Howard*	C	Orlando Magic (2007–2011); Los Angeles Lakers (2013, 2020); Houston Rockets (2014–2016); Atlanta Hawks (2017); Philadelphia 76ers (2021)	248	125	1.98
14	Al Horford^	C	Atlanta Hawks (2008–2013, 2015–2016); Boston Celtics (2017–2019, 2022–2025); Philadelphia 76ers (2020)	243	197	1.23
15	Julius Erving*	SF	Philadelphia 76ers (1977–1987)	239	141	1.70
16	Pau Gasol*	PF/C	Memphis Grizzlies (2004–2006); Los Angeles Lakers (2008–2013); Chicago Bulls (2015); San Antonio Spurs (2017–2018)	233	136	1.71
17	Draymond Green^	PF	Golden State Warriors (2013–2019, 2022–2023, 2025)	225	169	1.33
17	Robert Horry	PF/SF	Houston Rockets (1993–1996); Los Angeles Lakers (1997–2003); San Antonio Spurs (2004–2008)	225	244	0.92
17	Rasheed Wallace	PF/C	Portland Trail Blazers (1997–2003); Detroit Pistons (2004–2009); Boston Celtics (2010)	225	177	1.27
20	Caldwell Jones	C/PF	Philadelphia 76ers (1977–1982); Chicago Bulls (1985); Portland Trail Blazers (1986–1989); San Antonio Spurs (1990)	223	119	1.87
21	Elvin Hayes*	PF/C	San Diego Rockets (1969); Baltimore Bullets (1973); Capital/Washington Bullets (1974–1980); Houston Rockets (1982)	222	85	2.61
22	Alonzo Mourning*	C	Charlotte Hornets (1993, 1995); Miami Heat (1996–2001, 2005–2007)	215	95	2.26
23	Mark Eaton	C	Utah Jazz (1984–1993)	210	74	2.84
24	Kevin Durant^	SF/PF	Oklahoma City Thunder (2010–2014, 2016); Golden State Warriors (2017–2019); Brooklyn Nets (2021–2022); Phoenix Suns (2023–2024); Houston Rockets (2026)	205	171	1.20
25	Kevin Garnett*	PF	Minnesota Timberwolves (1997–2004); Boston Celtics (2008, 2010–2013); Brooklyn Nets (2014)	186	143	1.30
Rank	Player	Position(s)	Playoff team(s) played for (years)	Total blocks	Games played	Blocks per game average

== Progressive list for blocks ==
This is a progressive list of blocked shot leaders showing how the record has increased through the years.

^	Active NBA player
*	Inducted into the Naismith Memorial Basketball Hall of Fame
§	1st time eligible for Hall of Fame in 2026

Statistics accurate as of the 2026 NBA playoffs.

Team AbbreviationsTeam listed is the one player was on when he established the record.
ATL	Atlanta Hawks	DEN	Denver Nuggets	LAL	Los Angeles Lakers	OKC	Oklahoma City Thunder	WAS	Washington Wizards
BOS	Boston Celtics	DET	Detroit Pistons	MEM	Memphis Grizzlies	ORL	Orlando Magic	WSB	Washington Bullets
CHI	Chicago Bulls	GSW	Golden State Warriors	MIA	Miami Heat	POR	Portland Trail Blazers		
CHO	Charlotte Hornets	HOU	Houston Rockets	NJN	New Jersey Nets	SAS	San Antonio Spurs		
CLE	Cleveland Cavaliers	IND	Indiana Pacers	NOP	New Orleans Pelicans	UTA	Utah Jazz		
DAL	Dallas Mavericks	LAC	Los Angeles Clippers	NYK	New York Knicks	TOR	Toronto Raptors		

Playoff Block Leaders at the end of every season
Season	Year-by-year leader	Blk	Active leader	Blk	Career record	Blk	Single-season record	Blk	Season
1973–74	Kareem Abdul-Jabbar*MIL	39	Kareem Abdul-Jabbar*MIL	39	Kareem Abdul-Jabbar*MIL	39	Kareem Abdul-Jabbar*MIL	39	1973–74
1974–75	George JohnsonGSW	40	Elvin Hayes*WSB	54	Elvin Hayes*WSB	54	George JohnsonGSW	40	1974–75
1975–76	Gar HeardPHX	37	Elvin Hayes*WSB	82	Elvin Hayes*WSB	82	George JohnsonGSW	40	1975–76
1976–77	Bill Walton*POR	64	Elvin Hayes*WSB	104	Elvin Hayes*WSB	104	Bill Walton*POR	64	1976–77
1977–78	Marvin WebsterSEA	58	Elvin Hayes*WSB	156	Elvin Hayes*WSB	156	Bill Walton*POR	64	1977–78
1978–79	Elvin Hayes*WSB	52	Elvin Hayes*WSB	208	Elvin Hayes*WSB	208	Bill Walton*POR	64	1978–79
1979–80	Kareem Abdul-Jabbar*LAL	58	Elvin Hayes*WSB	212	Elvin Hayes*WSB	212	Bill Walton*POR	64	1979–80
1980–81	Julius Erving*PHI	41	Elvin Hayes*WSB	212	Elvin Hayes*WSB	212	Bill Walton*POR	64	1980–81
1981–82	Robert Parish*BOS	48	Kareem Abdul-Jabbar*LAL	233	Kareem Abdul-Jabbar*LAL	233	Bill Walton*POR	64	1981–82
1982–83	Kareem Abdul-Jabbar*LAL	55	Kareem Abdul-Jabbar*LAL	288	Kareem Abdul-Jabbar*LAL	288	Bill Walton*POR	64	1982–83
1983–84	Kareem Abdul-Jabbar*LAL	45	Kareem Abdul-Jabbar*LAL	333	Kareem Abdul-Jabbar*LAL	333	Bill Walton*POR	64	1983–84
1984–85	Kevin McHale*BOS	46	Kareem Abdul-Jabbar*LAL	369	Kareem Abdul-Jabbar*LAL	369	Bill Walton*POR	64	1984–85
1985–86	Hakeem Olajuwon*HOU	69	Kareem Abdul-Jabbar*LAL	393	Kareem Abdul-Jabbar*LAL	393	Hakeem Olajuwon*HOU	69	1985–86
1986–87	Hakeem Olajuwon*HOU	43	Kareem Abdul-Jabbar*LAL	428	Kareem Abdul-Jabbar*LAL	428	Hakeem Olajuwon*HOU	69	1986–87
1987–88	Kareem Abdul-Jabbar*LAL John SalleyDET	37	Kareem Abdul-Jabbar*LAL	465	Kareem Abdul-Jabbar*LAL	465	Hakeem Olajuwon*HOU	69	1987–88
1988–89	Manute BolGSW	29	Kareem Abdul-Jabbar*LAL	476	Kareem Abdul-Jabbar*LAL	476	Hakeem Olajuwon*HOU	69	1988–89
1989–90	Mark WestPHX	41	Robert Parish*BOS	275	Kareem Abdul-Jabbar*LAL	476	Hakeem Olajuwon*HOU	69	1989–90
1990–91	Vlade Divac*LAL	41	Robert Parish*BOS	282	Kareem Abdul-Jabbar*LAL	476	Hakeem Olajuwon*HOU	69	1990–91
1991–92	Larry NanceCLE	46	Robert Parish*BOS	297	Kareem Abdul-Jabbar*LAL	476	Hakeem Olajuwon*HOU	69	1991–92
1992–93	Oliver MillerPHX Hakeem Olajuwon*HOU	59	Robert Parish*BOS	303	Kareem Abdul-Jabbar*LAL	476	Hakeem Olajuwon*HOU	69	1992–93
1993–94	Hakeem Olajuwon*HOU	92	Hakeem Olajuwon*; HOU 1993–01; TOR 2001–02	329	Kareem Abdul-Jabbar*LAL	476	Hakeem Olajuwon*HOU	92	1993–94
1994–95	Hakeem Olajuwon*HOU	62	Hakeem Olajuwon*; HOU 1993–01; TOR 2001–02	391	Kareem Abdul-Jabbar*LAL	476	Hakeem Olajuwon*HOU	92	1994–95
1995–96	Shawn KempSEA	40	Hakeem Olajuwon*; HOU 1993–01; TOR 2001–02	408	Kareem Abdul-Jabbar*LAL	476	Hakeem Olajuwon*HOU	92	1995–96
1996–97	Greg OstertagUTA	47	Hakeem Olajuwon*; HOU 1993–01; TOR 2001–02	449	Kareem Abdul-Jabbar*LAL	476	Hakeem Olajuwon*HOU	92	1996–97
1997–98	Greg OstertagUTA	37	Hakeem Olajuwon*; HOU 1993–01; TOR 2001–02	465	Kareem Abdul-Jabbar*LAL	476	Hakeem Olajuwon*HOU	92	1997–98
1998–99	Tim Duncan*SAS	45	Hakeem Olajuwon*; HOU 1993–01; TOR 2001–02	468	Kareem Abdul-Jabbar*LAL	476	Hakeem Olajuwon*HOU	92	1998–99
1999–00	Shaquille O'Neal*LAL	55	Hakeem Olajuwon*; HOU 1993–01; TOR 2001–02	468	Kareem Abdul-Jabbar*LAL	476	Hakeem Olajuwon*HOU	92	1999–00
2000–01	Dikembe Mutombo*PHI	72	Hakeem Olajuwon*; HOU 1993–01; TOR 2001–02	468	Kareem Abdul-Jabbar*LAL	476	Hakeem Olajuwon*HOU	92	2000–01
2001–02	Shaquille O'Neal*LAL	48	Hakeem Olajuwon*; HOU 1993–01; TOR 2001–02	472	Kareem Abdul-Jabbar*LAL	476	Hakeem Olajuwon*HOU	92	2001–02
2002–03	Tim Duncan*SAS	79	Shaquille O'Neal*; LAL 2002–04; MIA 2004–07; PHX 2007–09; CLE 2009–10; BOS 2010–11	313	Kareem Abdul-Jabbar*LAL	476	Hakeem Olajuwon*HOU	92	2002–03
2003–04	Shaquille O'Neal*LAL	61	Shaquille O'Neal*; LAL 2002–04; MIA 2004–07; PHX 2007–09; CLE 2009–10; BOS 2010–11	374	Kareem Abdul-Jabbar*LAL	476	Hakeem Olajuwon*HOU	92	2003–04
2004–05	Ben Wallace*DET	59	Shaquille O'Neal*; LAL 2002–04; MIA 2004–07; PHX 2007–09; CLE 2009–10; BOS 2010–11	393	Kareem Abdul-Jabbar*LAL	476	Hakeem Olajuwon*HOU	92	2004–05
2005–06	Shaquille O'Neal*MIA	34	Shaquille O'Neal*; LAL 2002–04; MIA 2004–07; PHX 2007–09; CLE 2009–10; BOS 2010–11	427	Kareem Abdul-Jabbar*LAL	476	Hakeem Olajuwon*HOU	92	2005–06
2006–07	Tim Duncan*SAS	62	Shaquille O'Neal*; LAL 2002–04; MIA 2004–07; PHX 2007–09; CLE 2009–10; BOS 2010–11	433	Kareem Abdul-Jabbar*LAL	476	Hakeem Olajuwon*HOU	92	2006–07
2007–08	Pau Gasol*LAL	40	Shaquille O'Neal*; LAL 2002–04; MIA 2004–07; PHX 2007–09; CLE 2009–10; BOS 2010–11	446	Kareem Abdul-Jabbar*LAL	476	Hakeem Olajuwon*HOU	92	2007–08
2008–09	Dwight Howard*ORL	60	Shaquille O'Neal*; LAL 2002–04; MIA 2004–07; PHX 2007–09; CLE 2009–10; BOS 2010–11	446	Kareem Abdul-Jabbar*LAL	476	Hakeem Olajuwon*HOU	92	2008–09
2009–10	Dwight Howard*ORL	49	Shaquille O'Neal*; LAL 2002–04; MIA 2004–07; PHX 2007–09; CLE 2009–10; BOS 2010–11	459	Kareem Abdul-Jabbar*LAL	476	Hakeem Olajuwon*HOU	92	2009–10
2010–11	Serge IbakaOKC	52	Shaquille O'Neal*; LAL 2002–04; MIA 2004–07; PHX 2007–09; CLE 2009–10; BOS 2010–11	459	Kareem Abdul-Jabbar*LAL	476	Hakeem Olajuwon*HOU	92	2010–11
2011–12	Serge IbakaOKC	59	Tim Duncan*SAS	482	Tim Duncan*SAS	482	Hakeem Olajuwon*HOU	92	2011–12
2012–13	Roy HibbertIND	37	Tim Duncan*SAS	516	Tim Duncan*SAS	516	Hakeem Olajuwon*HOU	92	2012–13
2013–14	Serge IbakaOKC	42	Tim Duncan*SAS	545	Tim Duncan*SAS	545	Hakeem Olajuwon*HOU	92	2013–14
2014–15	Dwight Howard*HOU	39	Tim Duncan*SAS	555	Tim Duncan*SAS	555	Hakeem Olajuwon*HOU	92	2014–15
2015–16	Draymond Green^GSW	41	Tim Duncan*SAS	568	Tim Duncan*SAS	568	Hakeem Olajuwon*HOU	92	2015–16
2016–17	Clint Capela^HOU; Draymond Green^GSW	28	Serge Ibaka; TOR 2016–20; LAC 2020–21; MIL 2021–23	239	Tim Duncan*SAS	568	Hakeem Olajuwon*HOU	92	2016–17
2017–18	Clint Capela^HOU	36	Serge Ibaka; TOR 2016–20; LAC 2020–21; MIL 2021–23	252	Tim Duncan*SAS	568	Hakeem Olajuwon*HOU	92	2017–18
2018–19	Draymond Green^GSW	33	Serge Ibaka; TOR 2016–20; LAC 2020–21; MIL 2021–23	275	Tim Duncan*SAS	568	Hakeem Olajuwon*HOU	92	2018–19
2019–20	Anthony Davis^LAL	30	Serge Ibaka; TOR 2016–20; LAC 2020–21; MIL 2021–23	289	Tim Duncan*SAS	568	Hakeem Olajuwon*HOU	92	2019–20
2020–21	Brook Lopez^MIL	34	Serge Ibaka; TOR 2016–20; LAC 2020–21; MIL 2021–23	292	Tim Duncan*SAS	568	Hakeem Olajuwon*HOU	92	2020–21
2021–22	Robert Williams III^BOS	38	Serge Ibaka; TOR 2016–20; LAC 2020–21; MIL 2021–23	292	Tim Duncan*SAS	568	Hakeem Olajuwon*HOU	92	2021–22
2022–23	Anthony Davis^LAL	50	Serge Ibaka; TOR 2016–20; LAC 2020–21; MIL 2021–23	292	Tim Duncan*SAS	568	Hakeem Olajuwon*HOU	92	2022–23
2023–24	Daniel Gafford^DAL	33	LeBron James^LAL	275	Tim Duncan*SAS	568	Hakeem Olajuwon*HOU	92	2023–24
2024–25	Myles Turner^IND	46	LeBron James^LAL	284	Tim Duncan*SAS	568	Hakeem Olajuwon*HOU	92	2024–25
2025–26	Victor Wembanyama^SAS	78	LeBron James^LAL	287	Tim Duncan*SAS	568	Hakeem Olajuwon*HOU	92	2025–26
Season	Year-by-year leader	Blk	Active player leader	Blk	Career record	Blk	Single-season record	Blk	Season

== See also ==
- Basketball statistics
- NBA post-season records
