= 1975 World Championship Series =

The 1975 World Championship Series may refer to:

- 1975 NBA Finals
- 1975 Rugby League World Cup
