= Jamaal Wilkes =

American basketball player (born 1953)

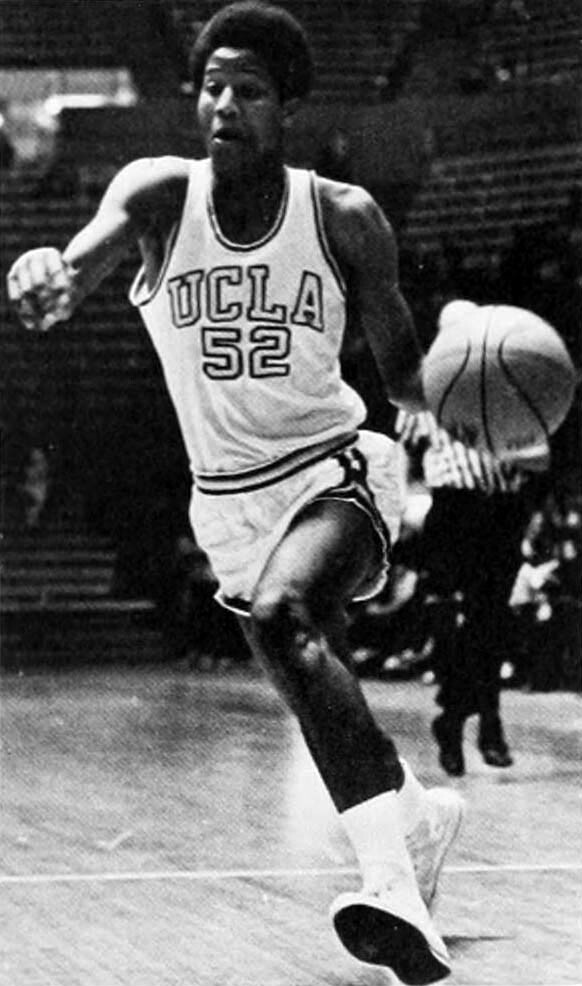
- Wilkes with UCLA c. 1971

Personal information
- Born: May 2, 1953 (age 73) Berkeley, California, U.S.
- Listed height: 6 ft 6 in (1.98 m)
- Listed weight: 190 lb (86 kg)

Career information
- High school: Ventura (Ventura, California); Santa Barbara (Santa Barbara, California)
- College: UCLA (1971–1974)
- NBA draft: 1974: 1st round, 11th overall pick
- Drafted by: Golden State Warriors
- Playing career: 1974–1985
- Position: Small forward
- Number: 41, 52

Career history
- 1974–1977: Golden State Warriors
- 1977–1985: Los Angeles Lakers
- 1985: Los Angeles Clippers

Career highlights
- 4× NBA champion (1975, 1980, 1982, 1985); 3× NBA All-Star (1976, 1981, 1983); 2× NBA All-Defensive Second Team (1976, 1977); NBA Rookie of the Year (1975); NBA All-Rookie First Team (1975); No. 52 retired by Los Angeles Lakers; 2× NCAA champion (1972, 1973); 2× Consensus first-team All-American (1973, 1974); 2× First-team All-Pac-8 (1973, 1974); Second-team All-Pac-8 (1972); No. 52 retired by UCLA Bruins; California Mr. Basketball (1969)

Career statistics
- Points: 14,644 (17.7 ppg)
- Rebounds: 5,117 (6.2 rpg)
- Assists: 2,050 (2.5 apg)
- Stats at NBA.com
- Stats at Basketball Reference
- Basketball Hall of Fame
- Collegiate Basketball Hall of Fame

Jamaal Abdul-Lateef (born Jackson Keith Wilkes, May 2, 1953), better known as Jamaal Wilkes, is an American former basketball player who was a small forward in the National Basketball Association (NBA). A three-time NBA All-Star, he won four NBA championships with the Golden State Warriors and Los Angeles Lakers. Nicknamed "Silk", he was inducted into the Naismith Memorial Basketball Hall of Fame.

Wilkes played college basketball for the UCLA Bruins. He was a two-time consensus first-team All-American and won two NCAA championships under coach John Wooden. He was selected in the first round of the 1974 NBA draft by Golden State. In his first season with the Warriors, he was named the NBA Rookie of the Year and helped the team win a league title. Wilkes won three more NBA championships with the Lakers during their Showtime era. He briefly played with the Los Angeles Clippers before retiring from playing. His jersey No. 52 was retired by both the Bruins and the Lakers.

Wilkes played the titular role of Cornbread in the 1975 coming-of-age feature film Cornbread, Earl and Me.

== Early life ==
Jackson Keith Wilkes was born in Berkeley, California. He was one of five children of L. Leander Wilkes, a Baptist minister, and Thelma (Benson) Wilkes. At the time, his parents had two daughters. Their oldest son died of crib death at 13 months when Thelma was four months pregnant with Wilkes. The death led Leander, who worked at the Oakland Naval Base, to enter the ministry.

Because he did not like the nickname Jackie, Wilkes went by Keith. His family had brief stays in Pine Bluff, Arkansas, and Dayton, Ohio, before he grew up in Ventura, California, having moved there in the second grade when his father became the pastor at Olivet Baptist Church in 1959. Wilkes attended Washington Elementary School and Cabrillo Middle School. He skipped the fifth grade. His older sister Naomi skipped two grades. A tomboy, she played basketball and helped Wilkes learn the game. She went to Stanford University at age 16.

As a junior at Ventura High School in 1969, Wilkes earned his second all-league selection in the Channel League and was named the league's player of the year. Over the summer, his father became pastor of the Second Baptist Church in Santa Barbara, and the family moved there prior to his senior year. Wilkes was Ventura High's incoming student body president, and his parents allowed him to stay in Ventura. However, he decided right before the school year began that he did not want to be apart from his family. His decision to move was controversial, but his Ventura coach, Bob Swanson, supported him. "If he was my kid I would have done the same thing", said Swanson. "He was a 16-year-old kid. He belonged with his family."

Starring for Santa Barbara High School with fellow future NBA player Don Ford, Wilkes led the Dons to 26 consecutive wins, and reached the playoff semifinals during the 1969–70 season. Wilkes was voted the California Interscholastic Federation Class AAAA Player of the Year by the Helms Foundation. He was named a prep All-American by Parade, Scholastic Magazines, and Sunkist–Coach and Athlete.

== College career ==
In his first year at the University of California, Los Angeles, Wilkes averaged a team-high 20.0 points per game on their freshman team, who went 20–0 and outscored their opponents by almost 39 points per game. The squad included Greg Lee (17.9) and Bill Walton (18.1, 16 rebounds, 68.6 field goal percentage). A group of UCLA students typically watched the freshman practice at Pauley Pavilion. One day, one of the regulars, UCLA band member Oliver Trigg, was impressed by a move that Wilkes made. At dinner, he came up to the team, which was eating dinner together at the dormitory dining hall, and gushed that Wilkes' move was "smooth as silk". The players started teasing Wilkes and calling him "Silk".

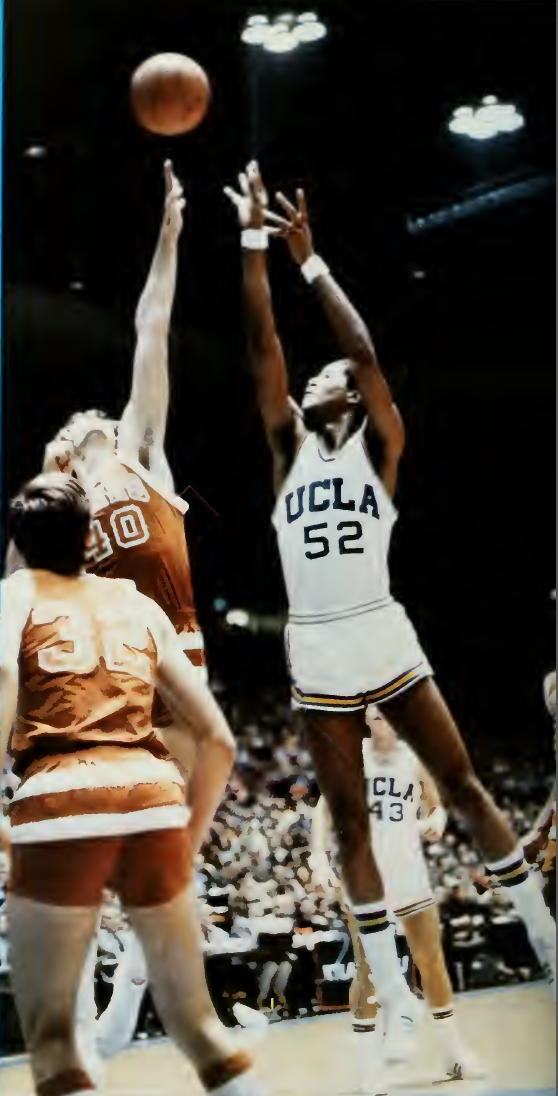
Wilkes against Texas in 1971

In Wilkes' sophomore year in 1971–72, Bruins' broadcaster Dick Enberg heard a couple of teammates calling him "Silk", and began using it on the air. The UCLA varsity team entered the season with a streak of five consecutive national championships, having finished the previous season winning their last 15 games. Departed from that team were Sidney Wicks, Curtis Rowe, and Steve Patterson, who won three straight NCAA titles together. Wilkes and fellow sophomores Walton and Lee entered the starting lineup, joining the only returning starter, Henry Bibby, and Larry Farmer. The Bruins scored over 100 points in their first seven games, en route to a perfect 30–0 season, winning by an average of 30.3 points per game. Wilkes averaged 8.2 rebounds per game, his college career high, and was a second-team All-Pacific-8 selection. In a close title game, UCLA won 81–76 over Florida State. Only one team had finished as close as six points against the Bruins. The Seminoles' Reggie Royals was assigned to defend Wilkes but was asked to drop back to help guard Walton. Wilkes had a season-high 23 points on 11-of-16 shooting and added 10 rebounds, while Walton earned the first of his two Final Four Most Outstanding Players with 24 points and 20 rebounds. They were both named to the all-tournament team.

Wilkes averaged 14.8 points and was named a consensus first-team All-American in 1972–73, when UCLA again finished 30–0. On January 27, 1973, they defeated Notre Dame for their 61st consecutive win, breaking San Francisco's record. The Bruins won the championship final over Memphis State behind Walton's 44 points on 21-for-22 shooting. The only other teammate scoring in double figures, Wilkes had 16 points along with seven rebounds. UCLA entered the 1973–74 season with a winning streak of 75. They extended their record to 88 before losing 71–70 to Notre Dame, with the Bruins missing five shots in the closing 20 seconds. UCLA advanced to the 1974 NCAA tournament semifinals, when they lost 80–77 in overtime to NC State. Wilkes ended his senior year with a career-high 16.7 points per game, and was a unanimous selection for the All-America first team. He was also unanimously voted to the All-Pac-8 first team for the second straight year.

In three years, Wilkes' teams compiled an 86–4 record, with all four losses from his senior year. He was one of the Bruins' most consistent players, averaging 15.0 points and 7.4 rebounds per game with a field goal percentage of 51.4. A three-time first-team Academic All-American (1972–1974), Wilkes graduated from UCLA in 1974 with a BA in economics.

== NBA career ==
=== Golden State Warriors ===
Wilkes was selected by the Golden State Warriors in the first round of the 1974 NBA draft with the 11th overall pick. Afterwards, he was filming a movie, "Cornbread, Earl and Me", and neglected training. He arrived at rookie camp out of shape and was disappointed in himself that he was unprepared. Before long, he was at the gym and martial arts classes to improve his conditioning. Prior to his first season in 1974–75, few people had championship expectations for the Warriors. Wilkes became a starter after only eight games, replacing incumbent Derrek Dickey. Paired with Rick Barry at small forward, the slim, 6-foot-6-inch (1.98 m) Wilkes played power forward. He averaged 14.2 points per game, ranked second on the Warriors behind Barry (30.6), and was also second on the team in rebounding with 8.2 per game. He was named the NBA Rookie of the Year. "[Wilkes] knows he must play the boards, and goes up against the [Paul] Silases and [Spencer] Haywoods each night. He's not flashy. But he gets the job done", said Barry. Teammate Bill Bridges added that Wilkes "is so intelligent and fundamentally sound. He makes contributions even when he's not scoring. He's already a complete player".

In the playoffs, Wilkes averaged 15.0 points and was praised for his defense against Chicago's Bob Love and Elvin Hayes of Washington, who Golden State swept in the 1975 NBA Finals. The following season in 1975–76, he was named to his first NBA All-Star Game. He ranked second on the Warriors in rebounding (8.8) again, and he was voted for the first of two consecutive NBA All-Defensive Second Team selections. Wilkes' scoring average improved to 17.8 in the regular season and 15.9 in the postseason, as Golden State advanced to the Western Conference finals, which they lost in seven games.

After three years with Golden State, averaging 16.5 points and 8.2 rebounds per game, Wilkes signed with the Los Angeles Lakers as a free agent. According to Wilkes, then-Warriors general manager Dick Vertlieb had reneged on his promise to renegotiate their contract if Wilkes had a good rookie showing; Vertlieb denied making such an agreement. Wilkes reportedly took less money by signing with the Lakers. He said "money isn't everything" and that he "needed a change of scenery, a fresh start". Returning to Southern California, where he grew up and went to college, weighed heavily in his decision. He was upset that some Bay Area sportswriters portrayed him as a deserter for playing out his option and signing with their in-state Pacific Division rival.

=== Los Angeles Lakers ===
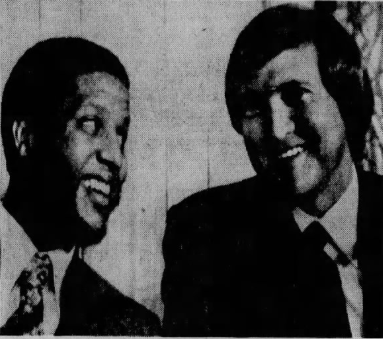
Wilkes, after signing with the Los Angeles Lakers, with his new coach Jerry West

The Lakers were coming off a league-high 53-win season, but had been eliminated 4–0 in the Western Conference finals by the eventual NBA champion Portland Trail Blazers. Wilkes was the top-rate forward that Lakers head coach Jerry West coveted. Wilkes' career with the Lakers began solidly in 1977–78, but a broken finger and other injuries limited him, and he was out much of the second half of the season, finishing with 51 games played and averaging 12.9 points. An anonymous team official accused him of malingering, and Lakers fans thought he was overrated. He bounced back the following season with his best pro season to date, averaging 18.6 points per game and shooting 50.4%. For a five-season span from 1978 through 1983, he was the Lakers' second-leading scorer behind Kareem Abdul-Jabbar.

Wilkes was a free agent leading up to the 1979–80 season, and new Lakers owner Jerry Buss made it a priority to re-sign him. Los Angeles traded 6-foot-4-inch (1.93 m) Adrian Dantley to Utah for 6-foot-9-inch (2.06 m) Spencer Haywood, the Lakers' first bona-fide power forward since Wilkes joined the team, freeing him to move to small forward and relieved from guarding players as much as five inches (13 cm) and 50 pounds (23 kg) bigger. Wilkes had been playing power forward his entire NBA career. He re-signed to a reported long-term deal at $600,000 per year. The Lakers also added Magic Johnson that year, drafting him with the first overall pick. Head coach Jack McKinney was injured midseason in a bicycle accident and was replaced by assistant Paul Westhead. Released from the rigors of playing power forward, Wilkes blossomed with the Lakers' fast break, averaging 20 points per game and shooting 53.5% that season. He helped the Showtime Lakers win three NBA championships (1980, 1982, 1985). One of the most memorable games of his career was the series-clinching Game 6 of the 1980 NBA Finals against the Philadelphia 76ers; Wilkes had a career-high 37 points and 10 rebounds, but was overshadowed by the rookie Johnson, who started at center in place of an injured Abdul-Jabbar and finished with 42 points, 15 rebounds, and seven assists. "Jamaal Wilkes had an unbelievable game", said Johnson in 2011. "Everybody talked about my 42 [points], but it was also his [37-point effort]."

Wilkes had his best offensive season in 1980–81, when he averaged 22.6 points, which ranked 11th in the NBA, shot 52.6% and played in the 1981 NBA All-Star Game. However, the Lakers were eliminated in the first round of the playoffs by Houston in a best-of-three series. Soon before the start of training camp in 1981–82, Wilkes' eight-day-old daughter died, his second child to die as a baby. He started the season slowly, culminating with a 1-for-10 shooting performance in a 128–102 loss to San Antonio on November 10, 1982. He seriously considered quitting basketball. On November 18, Johnson demanded to be traded, but Buss instead fired Westhead, who was replaced by assistant Pat Riley. Wilkes recovered to average 21.1 points and shoot 52.5% as Los Angeles advanced to the 1982 NBA Finals, where they faced Philadelphia again. He scored a team-high 27 points in game 6 as the Lakers won the series 4–2. In 1982, Wilkes signed a long-term contract extension with the Lakers. (Note: Sources reported that Wilkes and the Lakers agreed in principle in 1981 to an $8.5 million extension paid over 17 years, which was approved by the NBA in December 1982. According to the Los Angeles Times in 1985, it was a six-year, $5.3 million guaranteed contract signed in 1982, which included deferred payments of about $400,000 annually from 1990 to 1997.) They selected James Worthy with the first overall pick of the 1982 NBA draft, which they acquired from a trade made three years before. Although Wilkes was still in his prime, the Lakers valued Worthy's potential to play either forward position and backup Kurt Rambis at power forward. Wilkes received his third All-Star selection in 1983.

In 1983–84, Wilkes missed seven regular season games and the first seven games of the playoffs due to a gastrointestinal virus. After initially missing three games in late February 1984, he returned to play for a month before being sidelined for another four games. In the five previous seasons since 1978–79, he had missed just three games out of 410 and twice led the team in minutes played. Wilkes finished the regular season averaging 17.3 points, and led the team in scoring 18 times, but none after February 28, as the infection began taking its toll. With persistent headaches, stomach cramps and cold chills, he thought he had the flu at first. Antibiotics from team doctors failed to make him better, prompting him to visit his own physician, who linked his condition to a parasite. Upon returning in the playoffs on May 8 against Dallas, Wilkes received a standing ovation from the Forum crowd. Out of shape after the layoff, he saw limited play and averaged only 4.5 points in 14 games while shooting just 40%. He had entered the postseason with a streak of 58 consecutive games scoring 10+ points in the playoffs. Meanwhile, Worthy shined at small forward and was a key for the Lakers while starting in the finals against the Boston Celtics.

After hearing his name in trade rumors during the offseason, Wilkes began the 1984–85 season starting at forward along with Worthy. After the Lakers began the season with a 3–5 record, Wilkes lost his starting spot to Larry Spriggs. His play eventually improved, peaking with a season-high 24 points in a win over Portland on January 29, 1985. Three days later against New York at the Forum on February 1, ligaments in his left knee were torn when the Knicks' Ernie Grunfeld ran into him, and Wilkes missed the final 40 games of the regular season and the entire playoffs. He finished with then-career-lows of 42 games played and 8.3 points per game, but the Lakers won the 1985 NBA Finals over the Celtics with Worthy as one of their leaders.

Wilkes' leg atrophied, and he had to learn to walk again. After he played in the Southern California Summer Pro League and rehabilitated his knee, the Lakers waived him on August 28, 1985, with three years and $2.4 million remaining on his guaranteed contract. The team attributed the move to the NBA salary cap, freeing him to negotiate with any team without his Lakers' salary affecting that team. Wilkes also became expendable after they drafted A. C. Green.

=== Los Angeles Clippers ===
On September 27, 1985, Wilkes was signed by the Los Angeles Clippers for the league minimum salary of $70,000. However, he was out for almost a month of the season due to a sprained ankle. On December 24, Wilkes shocked the Clippers by announcing his retirement after a 12-year career, noting his lack of contributions to the team. He was averaging 5.8 points in 15 minutes per game. In 2015, he said that he thought he could help the Clippers reach the playoffs, but realized the team had a losing culture and "thought I was better off retiring". It was the first losing team of his pro career, and his first team with a losing record since he began playing basketball in the third grade. His pro teams had never missed the playoffs. After his success in the NBA, he ruled out continuing in Europe. "I could still walk down the street without limping. There were more reasons to get out than to stay in it”, said Wilkes.

== Player profile ==
Nicknamed "Silk" for his smooth moves, Wilkes rarely dunked the ball, preferring a layup off the glass, which his UCLA head coach, John Wooden, had preached. "I'm not going to sell tickets because I'm exciting or flashy, but if people appreciate good basketball, they might want to watch me", said Wilkes. He played well without needing the ball in his hands. He was a threat shooting from outside, and was also able to drive inside. Wilkes rarely turned the ball over. In the half-court offense, he had the ability to break free under the basket and receive bullet passes for layups. Most of his baskets came on mid-range jump shots.

Wilkes had an unorthodox but reliable jump shot, releasing the ball with a patent corkscrew motion behind his ear and over his head that resembled a slingshot. His feet hardly left the floor, almost on his toes, as he shot. He developed the shot as a child to be able to compete against bigger and stronger opponents on the playground, delaying release of the ball to avoid it being blocked. Wooden said that he would not have encouraged that form, but Wilkes consistently made his shots, so the coach left it alone. Barry called Wilkes' shooting form "the ugliest I ever saw. Until I started analyzing it. Yeah, he had that crazy right elbow flying out, but it came back straight to the basket before he let it go. In practice, it was ridiculous how easily he scored off me." Lakers teammate Norm Nixon said: "That shot was so ugly that people would say he can't make that shot, but he always surprised."

Many believed that the slender Wilkes would not be able to handle the physical demands of the NBA. He worked out with Nautilus equipment. He was not muscular, but Wooden said he was strong and never injured in college. Wilkes did not talk much on the court and showed little emotion. According to Wooden, he was not passive and was able to compete without fighting or being animated. When called for a foul, Wilkes raised his index finger and acknowledged the call, believing that officials appreciated non-complainers.

Wilkes, who was upstaged throughout his career by star teammates — including his best games — prioritized winning over individual accolades. "I learned at a very young age, you can debate who the best player was or wasn't, but you can't debate who won or lost", he said. According to Wilkes, he re-signed with the Lakers in 1979 realizing that he would be overlooked, but opted for the opportunity to win an NBA championship. Nevertheless, he did enjoy recognition. Asked if he ever felt slighted, he replied: "Slighted may be a bit strong, but it was something I was sensitive to. But I enjoyed the lifestyle. That was the tradeoff." Wilkes felt valued by teammates, coaches and owners. "Post-basketball it might have rankled me a bit more", he added.

== Legacy ==
Wilkes was never the leading man on his championship squads, but was outstanding in a supporting role in the shadow of stars Walton at UCLA, Barry with Golden State, and Abdul-Jabbar and Johnson on the Lakers. He excelled at contributing in whatever area the team needed, whether it be scoring, rebounding, or defending. Wilkes began his college career 73–0, which completed a record 88–game winning streak for UCLA. He joined forces with the three-time national player of the year Walton to lead the Bruins to two consecutive national championships, extending their record streak to seven. Wilkes enjoyed his best NBA seasons with the Lakers, with whom he spent eight seasons. He teamed with Abdul-Jabbar and Johnson to start the Lakers' Showtime era with three NBA championships in the early 1980s. Wilkes filled the lane on their famed fast break, converting Johnson's passes into layups. From 1979 to 1983, Wilkes averaged over 20 points and shot 53%. Lakers' announcer Chick Hearn dubbed his jumper the "20-foot (6.1 m) layup" for his consistency from outside.

According to the Los Angeles Times, Wilkes' "Silk" nickname "may be one of the most appropriate in sports". They wrote that "Wilkes' problem, from a public relations standpoint, may be that he makes everything look too easy". Lakers owner Jerry Buss called him "a rare combination of selflessness and grace, Jamaal made the game look effortless. It's easy to forget that Jamaal averaged 20-plus points during our 1980 and 1982 championship seasons". His Lakers' teammates Worthy and Michael Cooper, both above-the-rim finishers, are arguably more synonymous with Showtime, with Wilkes sometimes forgotten. "I don't think [Wilkes] got the credit he deserved, either in college or the pros", said Wooden. "He was unspectacular, but he played his same consistent game all the time."

For his NBA career, Wilkes registered 14,664 points (17.7 per game), 5,117 rebounds (6.2), and shot 49.9%, averaging 16.1 points per game in 113 postseason games. He played in the 1976, 1981, and 1983 All-Star Games and was named to the NBA All-Defensive Second Team twice. The Sporting News named Wilkes to its NBA All-Pro Second Team three years. In his first nine seasons, he rarely missed a game, seven times playing in at least 80 games.

Wilkes was inducted into the Ventura County Sports Hall of Fame in 1983 and the Pac-10 Men's Basketball Hall of Honor in 2007. In 2012, almost three decades since he last played in the NBA, he was voted as a member of the Naismith Memorial Basketball Hall of Fame. He was formally inducted on September 7, when he was presented by former teammates Walton, Barry, Abdul-Jabbar and Johnson—each Hall of Famers. On December 28, the Lakers retired Wilkes' No. 52, and on January 17, 2013, UCLA retired his college number, also 52. His number was retired by both Ventura and Santa Barbara High School.

In multiple interviews, including one with the New York Post in 1985, Wooden was asked to describe his ideal player: "I would have the player be a good student, polite, courteous, a good team player, a good defensive player and rebounder, a good inside player and outside shooter. Why not just take Jamaal Wilkes and let it go at that." The Los Angeles Times called Wooden's praise "probably the greatest honor any player could receive". Al Attles, Wilkes' head coach at Golden State, said "Whatever we asked of him–scoring, defense, rebounding, playing bigger forwards–he did and did well."

== Acting ==
Wilkes made his feature-film debut playing the lead titular character of basketball player Nathaniel "Cornbread" Hamilton in the 1975 drama Cornbread, Earl and Me. He made a guest appearance on an episode of the television program Trapper John, M.D. in 1981.

== Later years ==
After retiring from playing basketball, Wilkes worked in real estate, but he said there was "too much haggling and arguing", while he considered himself a "people person" and wanted to "help people solve problems". He then moved into financial services and motivational speaking. He was a co-author of the book Success Under Fire: Lessons For Being Your Best In Crunch Time. In 2003, he co-founded Jamaal Wilkes Financial Advisors, a firm specializing in wealth management. He co-authored his autobiography, Smooth as Silk: Memoirs of the Original, which released in 2015.

Wilkes was hired as vice president of basketball operations by the Los Angeles Stars for the inaugural season of the new American Basketball Association (ABA) in 2000. At Wilkes' request, Wooden also joined the Stars as a consultant.

== Personal life ==
Wilkes and his first wife had a daughter who was born in 1977 with a hole in her heart and weighing just three pounds (1.4 kg). She died after four months. During that period, Wilkes separated from his wife and filed for a divorce, ending their two-year marriage. He was also in a paternity suit that year, but was judged not to be the father.

Wilkes married his second wife Valerie in 1980. Their first daughter died when she was eight days old in 1981. They had three more children—two sons and a daughter. His older son, Omar, graduated from the University of California, Berkeley, where he played basketball as 6-foot-4-inch (1.93 m) shooting guard. He became a sports agent. His younger son, Jordan, who also graduated from Berkeley, played as a seven-foot (2.13 m) center. He joined the Lakers' basketball operations staff before the 2014–15 season. Wilkes' daughter played on the UCLA volleyball team.

Wilkes was involved with orthodox Islam for two years before converting, and selected his Islamic name near the end of 1974 during his rookie year. His parents were initially shocked and upset. He legally changed his name to Jamaal Abdul-Lateef in 1975, but he continued to use his birth surname only for purposes of public recognition.

In December 1990, Wilkes was pulled over by Los Angeles Police Department (LAPD) officers and handcuffed. A Black American, he accused them of racial profiling and filed a complaint. According to Wilkes, they said his license plate was about to expire and handcuffed him for 15–20 minutes after he responded, "Well, its not expired". He did not follow up after Rodney King was beaten by four police officers three months later, which was captured on video. Wilkes figured that the King incident was an indisputable case of racist behavior by the LAPD. However, the officers were acquitted in 1992, leading to riots in Los Angeles County.

== NBA career statistics ==
Legend
| GP | Games played | GS | Games started | MPG | Minutes per game |
| FG% | Field goal percentage | 3P% | 3-point field goal percentage | FT% | Free throw percentage |
| RPG | Rebounds per game | APG | Assists per game | SPG | Steals per game |
| BPG | Blocks per game | PPG | Points per game | **Bold** | Career high |
| † | Won an NBA championship |

=== Regular season ===
| Year | Team | GP | GS | MPG | FG% | 3P% | FT% | RPG | APG | SPG | BPG | PPG |
|---|---|---|---|---|---|---|---|---|---|---|---|---|
| 1974–75† | Golden State | **82** | — | 30.7 | .442 | — | .734 | 8.2 | 2.2 | 1.3 | .3 | 14.2 |
| 1975–76 | Golden State | **82** | **82** | 33.1 | .463 | — | .772 | **8.8** | 2.0 | 1.2 | .4 | 17.8 |
| 1976–77 | Golden State | 76 | — | 33.9 | .478 | — | .797 | 7.6 | 2.8 | **1.7** | .2 | 17.7 |
| 1977–78 | L.A. Lakers | 51 | — | 29.2 | .440 | — | .716 | 7.5 | **3.6** | 1.5 | .4 | 12.9 |
| 1978–79 | L.A. Lakers | **82** | **82** | 35.5 | .504 | — | .751 | 7.4 | 2.8 | 1.6 | .3 | 18.6 |
| 1979–80† | L.A. Lakers | **82** | **82** | **37.9** | **.535** | .176 | .808 | 6.4 | 3.0 | 1.6 | .3 | 20.0 |
| 1980–81 | L.A. Lakers | 81 | — | 37.4 | .526 | .077 | .758 | 5.4 | 2.9 | 1.5 | .4 | **22.6** |
| 1981–82† | L.A. Lakers | **82** | **82** | 35.4 | .525 | .000 | .732 | 4.8 | 1.7 | 1.1 | .3 | 21.1 |
| 1982–83 | L.A. Lakers | 80 | 80 | 31.9 | .530 | .000 | .757 | 4.3 | 2.3 | .8 | .2 | 19.6 |
| 1983–84 | L.A. Lakers | 75 | 74 | 33.4 | .514 | .250 | .743 | 4.5 | 2.9 | 1.0 | **.5** | 17.3 |
| 1984–85† | L.A. Lakers | 42 | 8 | 18.1 | .488 | .000 | .773 | 2.2 | 1.0 | .5 | .1 | 8.3 |
| 1985–86 | L.A. Clippers | 13 | 1 | 15.0 | .400 | **.333** | **.815** | 2.2 | 1.2 | .5 | .2 | 5.8 |
| Career | | 828 | 245 | 32.9 | .499 | .135 | .759 | 6.2 | 2.5 | 1.3 | .3 | 17.7 |
| All-Star | | 3 | 0 | 18.0 | .481 | — | 1.000 | 4.7 | 2.3 | 1.3 | .0 | 11.0 |

=== Playoffs ===
| Year | Team | GP | GS | MPG | FG% | 3P% | FT% | RPG | APG | SPG | BPG | PPG |
|---|---|---|---|---|---|---|---|---|---|---|---|---|
| 1975† | Golden State | **17** | — | 29.6 | .446 | — | .702 | 7.0 | 1.6 | 1.5 | **.8** | 15.0 |
| 1976 | Golden State | 13 | — | 34.6 | .430 | — | .778 | 7.9 | 2.2 | .9 | .6 | 15.9 |
| 1977 | Golden State | 10 | — | 34.6 | .429 | — | **.821** | 8.0 | 1.6 | 1.6 | .6 | 15.5 |
| 1978 | L.A. Lakers | 3 | — | 36.0 | .469 | — | .545 | **8.7** | 2.7 | 1.0 | .3 | 12.0 |
| 1979 | L.A. Lakers | 8 | — | 38.4 | .477 | — | .676 | 8.5 | 2.0 | **1.9** | .3 | 18.4 |
| 1980† | L.A. Lakers | 16 | — | **40.8** | .476 | .000 | .815 | 8.0 | 3.0 | 1.5 | .3 | **20.3** |
| 1981 | L.A. Lakers | 3 | — | 37.7 | .438 | .000 | .667 | 2.7 | 1.3 | .3 | .3 | 18.0 |
| 1982† | L.A. Lakers | 14 | — | 38.2 | **.502** | .000 | .776 | 5.0 | 2.6 | 1.1 | .2 | 20.0 |
| 1983 | L.A. Lakers | 15 | — | 39.3 | .498 | .000 | .614 | 6.0 | **3.4** | 1.3 | .7 | 19.9 |
| 1984 | L.A. Lakers | 14 | — | 14.0 | .400 | .000 | .636 | 1.9 | .6 | .3 | .1 | 4.5 |
| Career | | 113 | — | 33.6 | .465 | .000 | .727 | 6.4 | 2.2 | 1.2 | .5 | 16.1 |

== Publications ==
- Nelson, Pete; Wilkes, Jamaal; Schaper-Gordon, Gail (2006). Success Under Fire: Lessons for Being Your Best in Crunch Time. Valeo Press. ISBN 9780978641900.
- Wilkes, Jamaal; Davis, Edward Reynolds Jr. (2015). Memoirs of The Original Smooth As Silk. 88 STR8 Enterprises. ISBN 978-0615974842.
