= Charles Dudley (basketball) =

American basketball player

Personal information
- Born: March 5, 1950 (age 76) Harrisburg, Pennsylvania, U.S.
- Listed height: 6 ft 2 in (1.88 m)
- Listed weight: 180 lb (82 kg)

Career information
- High school: John Harris (Harrisburg, Pennsylvania)
- College: Moberly JC (1968–1970); Washington (1970–1972)
- NBA draft: 1972: 5th round, 76th overall pick
- Drafted by: Golden State Warriors
- Playing career: 1972–1979
- Position: Point guard
- Number: 12, 15, 5

Career history
- 1972–1973: Seattle SuperSonics
- 1974–1978: Golden State Warriors
- 1978–1979: Chicago Bulls

Career highlights
- NBA champion (1975)

Career statistics
- Points: 1,908 (5.3 ppg)
- Rebounds: 1,089 (3.0 rpg)
- Assists: 1,230 (3.4 apg)
- Stats at NBA.com
- Stats at Basketball Reference

Charles Dudley (born March 5, 1950) is an American former professional basketball player born in Harrisburg, Pennsylvania.

A 6'2" guard from the University of Washington, Dudley played six seasons (1972–1973; 1974–1979) in the National Basketball Association as a member of the Seattle SuperSonics, Golden State Warriors, and Chicago Bulls. He averaged 5.3 points per game and won an NBA Championship with Golden State in 1975.

== Career statistics ==
Legend
GP	Games played	GS	Games started	MPG	Minutes per game
FG%	Field goal percentage	3P%	3-point field goal percentage	FT%	Free throw percentage
RPG	Rebounds per game	APG	Assists per game	SPG	Steals per game
BPG	Blocks per game	PPG	Points per game	**Bold**	Career high
†	Won an NBA championship

=== NBA ===
==== Regular season ====
Year	Team	GP	GS	MPG	FG%	FT%	RPG	APG	SPG	BPG	PPG
1972–73	Seattle	12		8.3	.435	**.875**	.5	1.3			2.8
1974–75†	Golden State	67		11.3	.470	.722	2.2	1.5	.6	.0	4.1
1975–76	Golden State	**82**		17.8	**.528**	.641	3.2	2.9	**.9**	.0	6.4
1976–77	Golden State	79		**21.3**	.523	.635	**3.7**	4.4	.8	**.1**	**7.2**
1977–78	Golden State	78		**21.3**	.510	.708	**3.7**	**5.2**	**.9**	.0	5.0
1978–79	Chicago	43	8	15.9	.360	.667	2.0	2.7	.7	.0	2.7
Career		361	8	17.6	.497	.672	3.0	3.4	.8	.0	5.3

==== Playoffs ====
Year	Team	GP	MPG	FG%	FT%	RPG	APG	SPG	BPG	PPG
1975†	Golden State	**13**	8.6	.417	.571	1.3	1.3	.4	**.2**	2.8
1976	Golden State	**13**	20.0	**.579**	**.727**	2.8	2.9	**1.7**	.1	**6.9**
1977	Golden State	10	**23.6**	.351	.652	**3.8**	**6.9**	.7	.0	4.1
Career		36	16.9	.475	.655	2.5	3.4	.9	.1	4.6
