= Clifford Ray =

American basketball player and coach

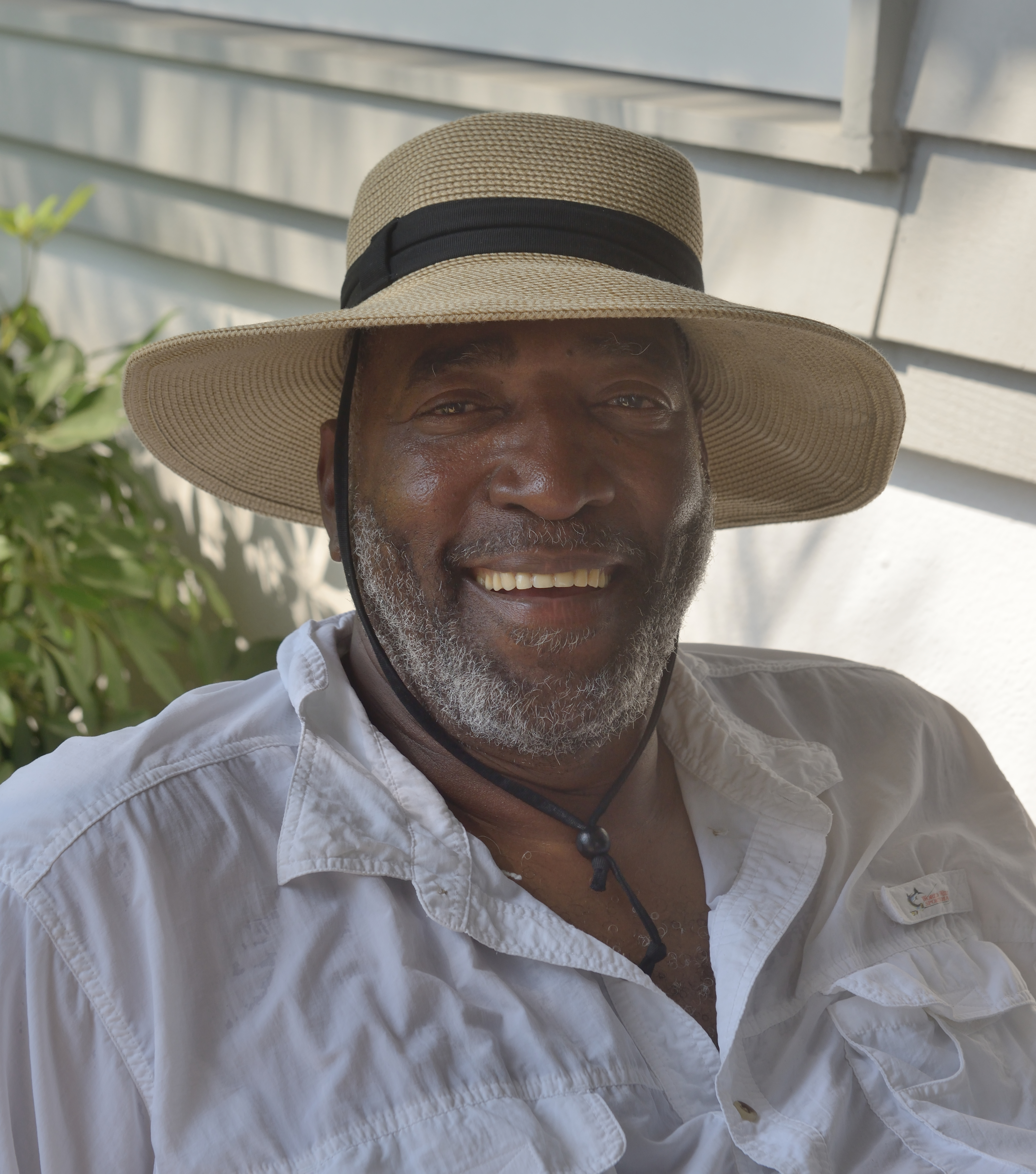
- Ray in 2017

Personal information
- Born: January 21, 1949 (age 77) Union, South Carolina, U.S.
- Listed height: 6 ft 9 in (2.06 m)
- Listed weight: 230 lb (104 kg)

Career information
- High school: Sims (Union, South Carolina)
- College: Oklahoma (1968–1971)
- NBA draft: 1971: 3rd round, 40th overall pick
- Drafted by: Chicago Bulls
- Playing career: 1971–1981
- Position: Center / power forward
- Number: 14, 44
- Coaching career: 1987–2013

Career history

Playing
- 1971–1974: Chicago Bulls
- 1974–1981: Golden State Warriors

Coaching
- 1987–1993: Dallas Mavericks (assistant)
- 1993–1994: Fort Wayne Fury
- 1995–1996: New Jersey Nets (assistant)
- 2000–2002: Golden State Warriors (assistant)
- 2002–2003: Cleveland Cavaliers (assistant)
- 2004–2005: Orlando Magic (assistant)
- 2006–2010: Boston Celtics (assistant)
- 2012–2013: Sacramento Kings (assistant)

Career highlights
- As player: NBA champion (1975); NBA All-Rookie First Team (1972); As assistant coach: NBA champion (2008)

Career statistics
- Points: 5,821 (7.4 ppg)
- Rebounds: 6,953 (8.9 rpg)
- Assists: 1,728 (2.2 apg)
- Stats at NBA.com
- Stats at Basketball Reference

Clifford Ray (born January 21, 1949) is an American former professional basketball player and coach. He played three of his ten seasons in the NBA with the Chicago Bulls from 1971 to 1974, and the other seven with the Golden State Warriors from 1974 to 1981.

== Career ==
Ray played college basketball at the University of Oklahoma, graduating with a Bachelor of Fine Arts degree (he can play most woodwind instruments). Selected in the third round of the 1971 NBA draft by the Chicago Bulls, Ray was, from the start, a very effective defender and rebounder. Ray was named to the 1972 NBA All-Rookie Team, and led the NBA in rebounds per minute played in each of his first two seasons. He spent three seasons with the Bulls, his best being 1973–74 during which Ray averaged 9.3 points and 12.2 rebounds per game, and the Bulls reached the NBA Western Conference finals for the first time.

Ray and $100,000 were sent to the Golden State Warriors for Nate Thurmond in an exchange of centers just prior to the 1974–75 season on September 3, 1974. The trade resulted in the Warriors receiving a quality ballplayer who was eight years younger than Thurmond and additional fiscal stability. In 1975 the Warriors, led by Rick Barry and coached by Al Attles, won the NBA championship. Ray led the team in rebounding and anchored the defense, finishing second in minutes played per game, after Barry. The Warriors defeated Ray's former team, the Chicago Bulls, in the Western Conference finals before sweeping the Washington Bullets in the NBA Finals.

Ray is one of a handful of players to have played at least ten seasons in the pros and to have recorded more rebounds than points for his career, a list that includes Basketball Hall of Famers Nate Thurmond, Bill Russell, Wes Unseld, Dennis Rodman, Dikembe Mutombo and Ben Wallace.

After his playing career, Ray worked as an assistant coach with the Dallas Mavericks in 1987. He also coached in the Continental Basketball Association, where he landed his first head coaching job with the Fort Wayne Fury, replacing former teammate Rick Barry as head coach at the end of the season. Later, he worked as a New Jersey Nets assistant before returning to Golden State as an assistant coach. He also worked as an assistant coach with the Orlando Magic and from 2005 to 2010 was an assistant coach for the Boston Celtics, who won an NBA championship in 2008. He was hired by the Sacramento Kings in 2012.

On June 5, 2013, new Kings coach Michael Malone announced that the 2012–13 assistant coaches would not be retained for the 2013–14 season. In 2016, Ray was hired by the Houston Rockets as a consultant.

== Dolphin rescue ==
In 1978, Ray made headlines for saving a dolphin's life at the Marine World/Africa USA amusement park in Redwood City, California. A bottlenose dolphin named "Mr. Spock" had swallowed a bolt with a protruding sharp screw while maintenance was being performed on its holding tank. The park veterinarian was unwilling to perform a risky operation to remove the bolt from the dolphin's first stomach where the object lay just beyond his reach. His remark that he needed longer arms led Marine World president and basketball fan Mike Demetrios to ask for Ray's assistance, as his arms measured at three feet nine inches (114 centimeters). With gloves, lubrication, and guidance, Ray successfully retrieved the screw without causing any additional harm.

== Career statistics ==
Legend
GP	Games played	GS	Games started	MPG	Minutes per game
FG%	Field goal percentage	3P%	3-point field goal percentage	FT%	Free throw percentage
RPG	Rebounds per game	APG	Assists per game	SPG	Steals per game
BPG	Blocks per game	PPG	Points per game	**Bold**	Career high
†	Won an NBA championship	*	Led the league

=== NBA ===
==== Regular season ====
Year	Team	GP	GS	MPG	FG%	3P%	FT%	RPG	APG	SPG	BPG	PPG
1971–72	Chicago	**82**	27	22.9	.499		.615	10.6	3.1			7.0
1972–73	Chicago	73	50	27.5	.492		**.619**	10.9	**3.7**			8.6
1973–74	Chicago	80	72	**32.9**	.511		.608	**12.2**	3.1	.7	**2.2**	9.3
1974–75†	Golden State	**82**		30.7	.522		.602	10.6	2.2	**1.2**	1.4	**9.4**
1975–76	Golden State	**82**	**82**	26.6	.525		.609	9.5	1.8	1.0	1.0	6.9
1976–77	Golden State	77		26.2	**.584**		.528	8.0	1.5	1.0	1.1	8.2
1977–78	Golden State	79		28.7	.571		.609	9.6	1.9	.9	1.1	8.8
1978–79	Golden State	**82***		23.4	.526		.558	7.4	1.7	.6	.6	6.9
1979–80	Golden State	81		20.8	.530	.000	.564	5.8	2.3	.6	.4	6.0
1980–81	Golden State	66		12.7	.421	–	.468	3.3	.8	.4	.2	2.4
Career		784	231	25.4	.524	.000	.588	8.9	2.2	.8	1.0	7.4

==== Playoffs ====
Year	Team	GP	MPG	FG%	FT%	RPG	APG	SPG	BPG	PPG
1972	Chicago	4	**40.3**	.529	**.778**	**16.5**	**4.0**			**15.3**
1973	Chicago	5	7.2	.375	–	1.8	.2			1.2
1974	Chicago	11	32.9	.500	.333	11.1	3.2	1.3	**1.9**	9.7
1975†	Golden State	**17***	29.1	.522	.604	9.8	2.2	.8	1.2	6.1
1976	Golden State	13	29.0	**.608**	.647	10.0	1.5	**1.5**	1.5	9.1
1977	Golden State	10	30.4	.553	.571	11.5	1.5	.4	.9	10.0
Career		60	28.9	.538	.590	10.1	2.1	1.0	1.4	8.3

== See also ==
- Bao Xishun, another person (formerly recognized world's tallest man) who used his long arms to reach into the stomachs of two dolphins.
