= 1975 NBA Finals =

1975 basketball championship series

Team	Coach	Wins
Golden State Warriors	Al Attles	4
Washington Bullets	K.C. Jones	0
- Dates: May 18–25
- MVP: Rick Barry (Golden State Warriors)
- Hall of Famers: Warriors: Rick Barry (1987); Jamaal Wilkes (2012); Bullets: Elvin Hayes (1990); Wes Unseld (1988); Coaches: K.C. Jones (1989, player); Al Attles (2019); Officials: Darell Garretson (2016); Earl Strom (1995)
- Eastern finals: Bullets defeated Celtics, 4–2
- Western finals: Warriors defeated Bulls, 4–3

The 1975 NBA World Championship Series was the championship round of the 1974–75 NBA season of the National Basketball Association. The Western Conference champion Golden State Warriors (48–34) played against the Eastern Conference champion Washington Bullets (60–22) for the championship. The series was played under a best-of-seven format. The underdog Warriors swept the heavily favored Bullets to win their first championship since 1956, when the team was still based in Philadelphia. Warriors small forward Rick Barry was named as the series MVP.

The Warriors' home games were played at the Cow Palace in Daly City near San Francisco due to scheduling conflicts at their normal home court of Oakland Arena during the week of May 19–26. In addition, an odd scheduling format had to be used because Golden State could not secure the Cow Palace for Memorial Day Weekend (May 24–26). A Sports Illustrated article about the series reported that Washington, which held home court advantage, was given the option of a 1-2-2-1-1 scheduling format due to Golden State's problems or, if they wished, opening on the road and then having Games 2, 3, and 4 at home. Washington opted for the 1-2-2-1-1 format not out of a sense of fairness, but because they wanted to open the series at home.

The series is notable as it was the first championship game or series in any of the major U.S. professional sports leagues to feature two black head coaches or managers, as Al Attles coached the Warriors and K.C. Jones coached the Bullets. It would remain the only series or game of such until Super Bowl XLI in 2007.

== Background ==
=== Golden State Warriors ===
The Golden State Warriors last made the NBA Finals in 1967, when they were still in San Francisco. In the years since, they moved to Oakland, briefly lost Rick Barry to the American Basketball Association, and named Warriors great Al Attles as head coach. Before the start of the 1974–75 season they traded future Hall of Famer Nate Thurmond to the Chicago Bulls for young center Clifford Ray. They also drafted Jamaal Wilkes, then known as Keith Wilkes, out of UCLA. With Barry as the offensive leader, and with Attles using a team approach to coaching, the Warriors managed to finish the season atop the Western Conference with 48 wins. In the playoffs, they defeated the Seattle SuperSonics in six games, then eliminated Thurmond and the Bulls in seven games to advance to the Finals.

=== Washington Bullets ===
The Washington Bullets were in their second season in the Washington Metropolitan Area, having moved from Baltimore prior to the 1973–74 season. The Bullets, led by Wes Unseld and Elvin Hayes, and coached by K. C. Jones, won 60 games that season, then overcame the Buffalo Braves and the defending champion Boston Celtics in seven and six games, respectively. The Bullets franchise headed to their second NBA Finals appearance, the last of which was a sweep by the Milwaukee Bucks in 1971.

=== Road to the Finals ===
Golden State Warriors (Western Conference champion)		Washington Bullets (Eastern Conference champion)
# / Western Conference; # / Team / W / L / PCT / GB; 1 / z-Golden State Warriors / 48 / 34 / .585 / –; 2 / y-Chicago Bulls / 47 / 35 / .573 / 1; 3 / x-Kansas City–Omaha Kings / 44 / 38 / .537 / 4; 4 / x-Seattle SuperSonics / 43 / 39 / .524 / 5; 5 / x-Detroit Pistons / 40 / 42 / .488 / 8; 6 / Portland Trail Blazers / 38 / 44 / .463 / 10; 6 / Milwaukee Bucks / 38 / 44 / .463 / 10; 8 / Phoenix Suns / 32 / 50 / .390 / 16; 9 / Los Angeles Lakers / 30 / 52 / .366 / 18; 1st seed in the West, 4th best league record	Regular season	# / Eastern Conference; # / Team / W / L / PCT / GB; 1 / z-Boston Celtics / 60 / 22 / .732 / –; 2 / y-Washington Bullets / 60 / 22 / .732 / –; 3 / x-Buffalo Braves / 49 / 33 / .598 / 11; 4 / x-Houston Rockets / 41 / 41 / .500 / 19; 5 / x-New York Knicks / 40 / 42 / .488 / 20; 6 / Cleveland Cavaliers / 40 / 42 / .488 / 20; 7 / Philadelphia 76ers / 34 / 48 / .415 / 26; 8 / Atlanta Hawks / 31 / 51 / .378 / 29; 9 / New Orleans Jazz / 23 / 59 / .280 / 37; 2nd seed in the East, 2nd best league record
Earned first-round bye	First round	Earned first-round bye
Defeated the (4) Seattle SuperSonics, 4–2	Conference semifinals	Defeated the (3) Buffalo Braves, 4–3
Defeated the (2) Chicago Bulls, 4–3	Conference finals	Defeated the (1) Boston Celtics, 4–2

=== Regular season series ===
Washington won the regular season series 3–1.

December 14, 1974

Golden State Warriors 91, Washington Bullets 99

Capital Centre, Landover, Maryland

January 4, 1975

Washington Bullets 96, Golden State Warriors 104

Oakland–Alameda County Coliseum Arena, Oakland, California

January 18, 1975

Golden State Warriors 101, Washington Bullets 125

Capital Centre, Landover, Maryland

February 6, 1975

Washington Bullets 98, Golden State Warriors 97

Oakland–Alameda County Coliseum Arena, Oakland, California

== Series summary ==
Game	Date	Home team	Result	Road team
Game 1	May 18	Washington Bullets	95–101 (0–1)	Golden State Warriors
Game 2	May 20	Golden State Warriors	92–91 (2–0)	Washington Bullets
Game 3	May 23	Golden State Warriors	109–101 (3–0)	Washington Bullets
Game 4	May 25	Washington Bullets	95–96 (0–4)	Golden State Warriors

Golden State wins the series, 4–0.

This was the first time in NBA Finals history in which the team who did not have home court advantage swept the series. This has happened only one time since, in 1995, when the Houston Rockets swept the Orlando Magic.

== Game summaries ==
=== Game 1 ===
May 18

Boxscore

Golden State Warriors 101, Washington Bullets 95
Scoring by quarter: 17–27, 23–27, 31–18, 30–23
Pts: Rick Barry 24; Rebs: Clifford Ray 16; Asts: Rick Barry 5	Pts: Elvin Hayes 29; Rebs: Hayes, Unseld 16 each Asts: Wes Unseld 6
Golden State leads series, 1–0

Capital Centre, Landover, Maryland
Attendance: 19,035
Referees: Joe Gushue, Earl Strom

Opting to open the series at home, the Bullets built a 14-point lead at the half over the Warriors at the Capital Centre. The Warriors began to storm back, with Phil Smith coming off the bench to score 20 points in 31 minutes of playing time, as Golden State took the first game, 101–95.

=== Game 2 ===
May 20

Boxscore

Washington Bullets 91, Golden State Warriors 92
Scoring by quarter: 28–19, 24–27, 21–27, 18–19
Pts: Phil Chenier 30; Rebs: Wes Unseld 20; Asts: Kevin Porter 8	Pts: Rick Barry 36; Rebs: Rick Barry 9 Asts: three players 4 each
Golden State leads series, 2–0

Cow Palace, Daly City, California
Attendance: 13,225
Referees: Richie Powers, Darell Garretson

Instead of their familiar Oakland Coliseum Arena, the Warriors were forced to play their first two scheduled home games of the series at the nearby Cow Palace (the Oakland facility being unavailable due to the Ice Follies). The Bullets jumped to an early 13-point lead, but Golden State battled back, led by 36 points from Rick Barry, to take a 92–91 lead in the closing seconds. Washington got the ball back with six seconds left but missed two shots and now were down 2–0.

=== Game 3 ===
May 23

Boxscore

Washington Bullets 101, Golden State Warriors 109
Scoring by quarter: 21–26, 27–24, 23–27, 30–32
Pts: Elvin Hayes 24; Rebs: Wes Unseld 15; Asts: Kevin Porter 6	Pts: Rick Barry 38; Rebs: Jamaal Wilkes 10; Asts: Rick Barry 6
Golden State leads series, 3–0

Cow Palace, Daly City, California
Attendance: 13,225
Referees: Jake O'Donnell, Don Murphy

Rick Barry poured in 38 points and backup center George Johnson had 10 points and nine rebounds off the bench to help the Warriors to a key Game 3 109–101 win.

Two major factors enabling the Warriors to take an insurmountable lead were the defensive play of the seemingly undersized Jamaal Wilkes on Bullets' power forward Elvin Hayes and the play of the Warrior bench. In three games, Hayes had only 29 points and the Warriors' bench players had outscored the Bullets' reserves 115–53.

=== Game 4 ===
May 25

Boxscore

Golden State Warriors 96, Washington Bullets 95
Scoring by quarter: 20–30, 28–22, 22–21, 26–22
Pts: Rick Barry 20; Rebs: Clifford Ray 11; Asts: Rick Barry 5	Pts: Phil Chenier 26; Rebs: Wes Unseld 16; Asts: Phil Chenier 11
Golden State wins series, 4–0

Capital Centre, Landover, Maryland
Attendance: 19,035
Referees: Richie Powers, Manny Sokol

Back at home, the Bullets seemed to be on their way to staving off an unexpected sweep by the underdog Warriors, leading by 14 points early on. Bullets forward Mike Riordan was assigned to guard Barry, who had killed the Bullets in the series up to that point by averaging 35 points a game. Riordan played Barry very physically, arousing the ire of Warriors' coach Al Attles. Midway through the first quarter, Barry went on a drive to the basket and was fouled hard from behind by Riordan. Barry reacted with a shove, but Attles bolted onto the court and initiated a fight of his own with Riordan, thereby protecting his star player from an ejection and getting ejected himself. The remainder of the game was directed by assistant coach Joe Roberts.

The Bullets controlled the game and led most of the way, leading by as many as eight in the fourth quarter at 90–82 after a Riordan drive and layup where he injured his ankle. Bullets coach K.C. Jones pulled Riordan and sent in little-used Dick Gibbs, with Nick Weatherspoon mired in a shooting slump. Barry and Hayes exchanged baskets, keeping the Bullets up by eight at 92–84. After a Jamaal Wilkes basket, Kevin Porter missed a pair of free throws and Butch Beard hit a jumper to cut the Bullet lead to four at 92–88. Porter then threw away an easy pass on the Bullets' next trip, and Wilkes canned a jumper to cut it to two at 92–90. Porter missed a layup, and then Wilkes hit a rebound basket to tie the score. Hayes, who had only 15 points, then hit one of two to give the lead back to the Bullets. Beard answered with a drive and basket to give the Warriors a 94–93 lead. Unseld then threw away an easy bounce pass to give the ball back to the Warriors with 1:26 left. With 1:08 left, Barry put up a jumper and missed, and Hayes hit a wide-open Gibbs with an outlet pass, but Gibbs blew the layup. The Warriors turned the ball over on a 24-second violation with 33 seconds left, but the Bullets gave it back to them after a timeout when Unseld fumbled an inbounds pass into the backcourt. Beard then hit one of two, then one of three to give the Warriors their final margin.

== Television coverage ==
CBS broadcast the 1975 NBA Finals in the United States, with Brent Musburger on play-by-play and Oscar Robertson on color commentary. With Rick Barry playing for the Warriors in this series, the recently retired Robertson filled his spot; Barry went on to cover the next six NBA Finals, five of which while still an active player. The 1975 Finals is also the oldest NBA championship series whose TV coverage still exists in its entirety; since 1975, only the 1978 Finals, where three of the seven contests are now considered missing, is the one exception.

== Team rosters ==
=== Golden State Warriors ===
1974–75 Golden State Warriors roster
Players

Pos.	No.	Player	Height	Weight	DOB	From
F	24	Rick Barry	6 ft 7 in (2.01 m)	205 lb (93 kg)		Miami (FL)
G	21	Butch Beard	6 ft 3 in (1.91 m)	185 lb (84 kg)		Louisville
G	22	Steve Bracey	6 ft 1 in (1.85 m)	175 lb (79 kg)		Tulsa
F	32	Bill Bridges	6 ft 6 in (1.98 m)	228 lb (103 kg)		Kansas
F	40	Derrek Dickey	6 ft 7 in (2.01 m)	218 lb (99 kg)		Cincinnati
G	15	Charles Dudley	6 ft 2 in (1.88 m)	180 lb (82 kg)		Washington
G	10	Charles Johnson	6 ft 0 in (1.83 m)	170 lb (77 kg)		California
C	52	George Johnson	6 ft 11 in (2.11 m)	205 lb (93 kg)		Dillard
G	23	Jeff Mullins	6 ft 4 in (1.93 m)	190 lb (86 kg)		Duke
C	44	Clifford Ray	6 ft 9 in (2.06 m)	230 lb (104 kg)		Oklahoma
G	20	Phil Smith	6 ft 4 in (1.93 m)	185 lb (84 kg)		San Francisco
F	41	Jamaal Wilkes	6 ft 6 in (1.98 m)	190 lb (86 kg)		UCLA

Coaches
Head coach
- Al Attles (North Carolina A&T)
Assistant(s)
- Joe Roberts (Ohio State)

Legend
- (DP) Unsigned draft pick
- (FA) Free agent
- (S) Suspended
- Injured

=== Washington Bullets ===
1974–75 Washington Bullets roster
Players

Pos.	No.	Player	Height	Weight	DOB	From
G	45	Phil Chenier	6 ft 3 in (1.91 m)	180 lb (82 kg)		California
G	23	Dennis DuVal	6 ft 3 in (1.91 m)	175 lb (79 kg)		Syracuse
G/F	21	Dick Gibbs	6 ft 5 in (1.96 m)	210 lb (95 kg)		UTEP
C	11	Elvin Hayes	6 ft 9 in (2.06 m)	235 lb (107 kg)		Houston
PF	22	Tom Kozelko	6 ft 8 in (2.03 m)	220 lb (100 kg)		Toledo
SG	6	Mike Riordan	6 ft 4 in (1.93 m)	200 lb (91 kg)		Providence
F	33	Leonard Robinson	6 ft 7 in (2.01 m)	225 lb (102 kg)		Tennessee State
F	41	Wes Unseld	6 ft 7 in (2.01 m)	245 lb (111 kg)		Louisville
F	12	Nick Weatherspoon	6 ft 7 in (2.01 m)	197 lb (89 kg)		Illinois

Coaches
Head coach
- K. C. Jones

Legend
- (DP) Unsigned draft pick
- (FA) Free agent
- (S) Suspended
- Injured

== Aftermath ==
The Washington Bullets would re-appear in the NBA Finals in 1978 and 1979 against the Seattle SuperSonics, with a series win in seven games and a series loss in five games respectively.

After the upset win, the Warriors finished the 1975–76 season with a then-franchise-best 59–23 record, but were upset in the conference finals by the Phoenix Suns, losing Games 6 and 7 after going up 3–2 in the series. In the 1976–77 season, the Warriors won 46 games and won their first round match-up against Detroit Pistons, but lost to the Los Angeles Lakers in the next round in another seven game series. They would then enter a massive slump, making the playoffs only eight times over the next four decades. They would not win their next championship until 40 years later in 2015 against the LeBron James-led Cleveland Cavaliers in six games.

== See also ==
- 1975 NBA playoffs
- 1974–75 NBA season
