= Butch Beard =

American basketball player and coach

Personal information
- Born: May 4, 1947 (age 79) Hardinsburg, Kentucky, U.S.
- Listed height: 6 ft 3 in (1.91 m)
- Listed weight: 185 lb (84 kg)

Career information
- High school: Breckinridge County (Harned, Kentucky)
- College: Louisville (1966–1969)
- NBA draft: 1969: 1st round, 10th overall pick
- Drafted by: Atlanta Hawks
- Playing career: 1969–1979
- Position: Point guard
- Number: 14, 21, 9

Career history

Playing
- 1969–1970: Atlanta Hawks
- 1971–1972: Cleveland Cavaliers
- 1972–1973: Seattle SuperSonics
- 1973–1975: Golden State Warriors
- 1975: Cleveland Cavaliers
- 1975–1979: New York Knicks

Coaching
- 1990–1994: Howard
- 1994–1996: New Jersey Nets
- 2001–2006: Morgan State

Career highlights
- NBA champion (1975); NBA All-Star (1972); Third-team All-American – UPI (1969); 3× First-team All-MVC (1967–1969); Second-team Parade All-American (1965); Kentucky Mr. Basketball (1965)

Career statistics
- Points: 5,622 (9.3 ppg)
- Rebounds: 2,042 (3.4 rpg)
- Assists: 2,189 (3.6 apg)
- Stats at NBA.com
- Stats at Basketball Reference

Alfred "Butch" Beard Jr. (born May 5, 1947) is an American former professional basketball player and coach. He was the starting point guard with the 1975 NBA champion Golden State Warriors. He played college basketball for the Louisville Cardinals, where he was a three-time All-Missouri Valley Conference selection. In high school, he was Kentucky Mr. Basketball. He coached for over 20 seasons at the collegiate and professional levels.

== Early years ==
Beard was born on May 4, 1947, in Hardinsburg, Kentucky, a community of about 1,000 people. Beard played high school basketball at Breckinridge County High School. As a junior, he missed nine games with a broken wrist, but still led the Bearcats to the 1964 state championship game. Breckinridge lost to a Wes Unseld-led Louisville Seneca High School team, 66–56. Beard averaged 14.8 points per game in the tournament, and was named to the 1964 Kentucky state high school basketball tournament's All-Tournament Team. Overall in 1964, he averaged 17.3 points and 19 rebounds per game, with a .573 field goal percentage; and was named All-State. Beard and future Naismith Hall of Fame center Unseld would later become roommates at the University of Louisville.

As a senior in 1965, the 6 ft 3 in (1.91 m) 175 lb (79.4 kg) Beard played center for Breckinridge. He was named Kentucky Mr. Basketball. He led the Bearcats back to the Kentucky high school state tournament title game, winning the state championship, 95–73. In four tournament games Beard scored 113 points (28.3 points per game), including 30 points in the championship game. He was again named to the All-Tournament Team.

He was a second-team Parade All-American in 1965. Overall in 1965, he averaged 26 points and 17.5 rebounds per game, with a .580 field goal percentage. The 1965 Kentucky championship was Breckinridge's first and only state basketball title. Breckinridge merged into Irvington High School the following school year.

Academically, Beard was an honor student in high school, and a member of the National Honor Society. In addition to basketball, he pitched on the school's baseball team and was a member of the track team.

== College career ==
Beard was pursued by more than 50 colleges. He was recruited by future Hall of Fame coach Adolph Rupp to attend the University of Kentucky. Beard narrowed his college choices to Kentucky, Louisville, Murray State University and Western Kentucky University, ultimately attending Louisville. He originally signed a letter of intent to attend Louisville, but ten days later a Beard family attorney announced Beard instead would be attending Kentucky; and would seek to nullify any agreements with Louisville. This would have made him the first African American to receive an athletic scholarship at Kentucky. However, documentation first signed by Beard and his father with Louisville and the Missouri Valley Conference, before any letter of intent was signed with Kentucky, would have limited Beard's eligibility to play basketball at Kentucky to two years, if enforceable. In early June 1965, the family instructed the attorney not to take any further steps in seeking to nullify the Louisville documents and Beard attended Louisville.

In his sophomore year at Louisville (1966–67), playing guard, Beard averaged 20.5 points and eight rebounds per game. He led the team in scoring and was second in rebounding to Wes Unseld's 19 rebounds per game average. The Cardinals were 23–5 that season, and ended the year ranked No. 2 by the Associated Press (AP). Beard was third in the Missouri Valley Conference in scoring average. They were Missouri Valley Conference champions, but lost in the first round of the 1967 NCAA Division I Men's Basketball Tournament in the Midwest Regional semifinal to Southern Methodist University, 83–81. Beard scored 14 points in that game. They lost the Midwest Regional game for third place to the University of Kansas, 70–68, with Beard scoring 17 points. Beard was named All-Missouri Valley Conference, along with Unseld.

As a junior (1967–68), Beard averaged 16 points and 4.9 rebounds per game. He was again selected All-Missouri Valley Conference. The Cardinals had a 21–7 record, and again won the Missouri Valley Conference title. They finished ranked No. 9 in the final AP poll that season. Louisville lost in the NCAA tournament's Midwest Regional semifinal to the No. 1 ranked University of Houston, 91–75, with Beard scoring 21 points. They defeated Kansas State University in the third-place game, 93–63, with Beard again scoring 21 points. Beard was selected to the All-Midwest Regional Team.

As a senior (1968–69), Beard led the Cardinals with a 20.6 points per game average. He also averaged six rebounds per game. With Unseld having graduated, they finished second in the Missouri Valley Conference and did not make the NCAA tournament. He was sixth in the conference in scoring. Beard was All-Missouri Valley Conference for the third consecutive year. United Press International (UPI) named him third-team All America.

In college, he double-majored in physical education and social work.

== Professional career ==
Beard was selected by the Dallas Chaparrals in the ninth round of 1969 ABA draft, and by the Atlanta Hawks in the first round of the 1969 NBA draft, 10th overall. In his rookie season, Atlanta had veteran guards Walt Hazard and Don Ohl, as well as small forward/shooting guards Lou Hudson and Joe Caldwell, playing ahead of Beard. He appeared in 72 games, averaging 13.1 minutes, 7.0 points, 1.7 assists and 1.9 rebounds per game. The Hawks defeated the Chicago Bulls in five games in the first round of the 1970 Western Division playoffs. Beard averaged 16.2 minutes, nine points and 2.8 rebounds per game. In Game 5, he had 18 points and five rebounds in 23 minutes. The Lakers swept the Hawks in four games in the Western Division finals, with Beard averaging 16.3 minutes, nine points and three rebounds per game.

The Hawks drafted all-time college scoring leader Pete Maravich with the third pick in the 1970 NBA draft, and left Beard exposed in the 1970 expansion draft. Beard was selected by the Cleveland Cavaliers. However, he was drafted into the United States Army for two years, and did not play during the 1970–71 season; instead serving at Ft. Knox. He received an early discharge from the Army and was available to the Cavaliers on November 8, 1971.

Beard had his best NBA season in 1971–72 with the Cavaliers. He had career-high averages in minutes (35.8) and points (15.4) per game, and was selected to play in the NBA All-Star Game for the only time in his career. He was also the Cavaliers' captain that season. After the 1972 season, the Cavaliers traded the 25-year old Beard to the Seattle SuperSonics for Lenny Wilkens and Barry Clemens. The 35-year old Wilkens was not only the SuperSonics starting point guard in 1971–72, he was also the team's head coach; eventually entering the Hall of Fame as both a player and coach. Seattle fans were upset with the team for trading the popular Wilkens, and treated Beard harshly; undermining his confidence and his play. In 1972–73 with the SuperSonics, Beard played only 19.2 minutes per game as a point guard, averaging 6.6 points, 3.4 assists, and 2.4 rebounds per game; playing behind starting guards Dick Snyder and Fred Brown.

After the season ended, in July 1973, the Supersonics traded Beard to the Golden State Warriors for guard Mahdi Abdul-Rahman (formerly known as Walt Hazzard). Beard played point guard for the Warriors in 1973–74, and his playing time increased to 27 minutes per game. He averaged 10.2 points, 3.8 assists and 4.9 rebounds per game. In 1974–75, his playing time increased again, to 30.7 minutes per game. He also played in all 82 regular season games for the only time in his career. He averaged 12.8 points, 4.2 assists and 3.9 rebounds per game.

The Warriors won the 1974–75 NBA championship. They defeated the SuperSonics in six games in the Western Conference semifinals. Beard averaged 8.2 points, 4.3 rebounds and 3.7 points in 28 minutes per game. The Warriors then beat the Chicago Bulls in a seven-game Western Conference finals series. Beard averaged 10.9 points, 4.7 rebounds and 3.3 assists in 29.3 minutes per game. The Warriors then swept the Washington Bullets in four games to win the NBA title. Beard averaged 18.8 minutes, 7.3 points, 3.3 rebounds and two assists per game in that series. Beard scored the Warriors' final four points in their Game 4, 96–95, win; with his final two made free throws clinching the closing game victory. He had 16 points in 25 minutes in that game, second only to Rick Barry in points for the Warriors.

Ten days after winning the championship, the Warriors sent Beard to the Cleveland Cavaliers. This completed an earlier trade just before the May 29 NBA draft, when the Warriors sent their first and second round 1975 draft picks, and future considerations, to the Cavaliers for forward Dwight Davis. Beard was only with Cleveland, under head coach Bill Fitch, until the end of November when he was claimed on waivers by the New York Knicks. He played in 15 games with the Cavaliers, averaging 17 minutes and 6.5 points per game. With the Knicks that season, under future Hall of Fame head coach Red Holzman, Beard played in 60 games behind future Hall of Fame guards Walt Frazier and Earl Monroe, averaging 24.2 minutes, 8.4 points and 2.9 assists per game.

Beard finished his playing career with the Knicks. He played in 70 games for the Knicks in the 1976–77 season, averaging 15.5 minutes, 5.3 points, 2.1 assists and 2.3 rebounds per game, playing behind Monroe and Frazier. The following season (1977–78) was Beard's final full season in the NBA; now under head coach Willis Reed. He appeared in 79 games, averaging 25.1 minutes, 9.4 points, 4.3 assists and 3.3 rebounds per game. The Knicks defeated the Cavaliers in the first round of the Eastern Conference playoffs that season. Beard averaged 29 minutes, 7.5 points, four assists and 1.5 rebounds per game in a two-game sweep. The Philadelphia 76ers then swept the Knicks in four games in the Eastern Conference semifinals. Beard averaged 25.5 minutes, 9.8 points, 4.8 assists and 4.5 rebounds per game.

Beard played seven games with the Knicks in the 1978–79 season, his last games as an NBA player. He was on the verge of being waived by the Knicks when he left the team in early November 1978. Beard believed he was not getting the playing time he thought he merited. At the time, the Knicks were coached by Reed. Reed was fired after 14 games, and Red Holzman came out of retirement to coach the Knicks again. Less than two weeks after Beard had left the team, Holzman brought Beard back as an assistant coach.

In his nine NBA seasons, Beard scored 5,622 points, with 2,189 assists and 2,042 rebounds; averaging 23.6 minutes, 9.3 points, 3.6 assists and 3.4 rebounds per game.

== Coaching career ==
In bringing Beard on as an assistant coach in November 1978, Knicks' future Hall of Fame head coach Red Holzman said Beard "has great basketball sense, command, and knows a lot about the team. We had a lot of respect for his knowledge". His Knicks teammate Ray Williams said "Butch is the kind of guy who can talk to everybody, and carries himself well. His coming in has got to help the guys out". Future Hall of Fame Knicks forward Spencer Haywood said about Beard returning to the Knicks as a coach, "How happy can a man be? That's how happy I am that Butch is coming back". After the season, Reed visited Beard at his home and they mended their relationship. Beard went on to coach at the professional and college levels in over 20 seasons.

Beard was an assistant coach with the Knicks for four seasons (1978 to 1982), remaining with the team until the end of Holzman's second tenure as Knicks head coach. Beard spent time as an advance scout for the Atlanta Hawks. He was next hired as an assistant coach for two seasons with the New Jersey Nets (1988 to 1990). His first season was under head coach Willis Reed (1988–89); and second was under Bill Fitch (1989–90), who had coached Beard in Cleveland.

In 1990, Beard was hired as head coach at Howard University, in the Mid-Eastern Athletic Conference (MEAC). One of the other finalists for the job was Walt Hazard, a former teammate for whom he also had once been traded. He coached four years (1990–1994) at Howard. The team's best season during that time was in 1991–92, tying for first place in the MEAC and finishing the season with a 17–14 record. Howard reached the first round of the 1992 NCAA Division I Men's Basketball Tournament, losing to the University of Kansas. He was MEAC Coach of the Year that season.

In 1994, Willis Reed, now the Nets general manager, hired Beard as the Nets' head coach. Beard coached the Nets for two seasons (1994 to 1996), finishing 30–52 both seasons. The Nets fired Beard in late April 1996. Reed was fired in early May. Beard was next hired as an assistant coach for the Dallas Mavericks, where he coached during two seasons (1996 to 1997), under head coach Jim Cleamons. He was fired along with Cleamons in early December 1997. In 1999, he was hired by the Washington Wizards as an assistant coach under first-year head coach Gar Heard. Heard was fired in late January, but Beard finished the 1999–2000 season with the Wizards.

In June 2001, Beard was hired as head coach of Morgan State University's men's basketball team, in Baltimore. Beard coached five seasons at Morgan State (2001 to 2006), with an overall record of 39–105. He was named MEAC Coach of the Year in 2002–03.

== Media career ==
Beard was a television color analyst for New York Knicks games on the MSG Network during the 1980s, working with Marv Albert. He was first hired before the 1982–83 season to provide color commentary on Knicks home games, and worked with the network until April 1986.

== Legacy and honors ==
In January 2021, Beard wrote a letter to University of Louisville president Dr. Neeli Bendapudi asking that the university remove his name and accomplishments from the school's history (including its Hall of Fame), and cease any mention of him by the school going forward. Beard believed that Louisville had failed in its treatment of young black men at the school, and it lacked a commitment to diversity and opportunity in hiring. He also strongly mentioned what he saw as the school's failure to give proper respect and recognition to Wes Unseld's importance and contributions to the university, while honoring others; especially considering Unseld's recent death and that Unseld was a Louisville native who brought great success to the school's basketball program and established a foundation for its future success.

In 1981, Beard was inducted into the University of Louisville Athletics Hall of Fame. In 1988, he was inducted into the Kentucky Athletic Hall of Fame. He is member of the Kentucky High School Athletic Association Hall of Fame and the Kentucky High School Basketball Hall of Fame.

== Personal life ==
He resided with his wife and children in Louisville during his playing days. During the summers, he belonged to a group of athletes helping underprivileged children in Louisville, called "Louisville Pros". Also during that time, he took classes towards a master's degree in business, and sought out investment opportunities.

Beard moved to Harlem in 2014, where he mentored underserved youth and was on the board of YES, Inc.

== NBA career statistics ==
Legend
GP	Games played	GS	Games started	MPG	Minutes per game
FG%	Field goal percentage	3P%	3-point field goal percentage	FT%	Free throw percentage
RPG	Rebounds per game	APG	Assists per game	SPG	Steals per game
BPG	Blocks per game	PPG	Points per game	**Bold**	Career high
†	Won an NBA championship	*	Led the league

=== Regular season ===
Year	Team	GP	GS	MPG	FG%	3P%	FT%	RPG	APG	SPG	BPG	PPG
1969–70	Atlanta	72	–	13.1	.467	–	.828	1.9	1.7	–	–	7.0
1971–72	Cleveland	68	–	**35.8**	.464	–	.760	4.1	**6.7**	–	–	**15.4**
1972–73	Seattle	73	–	19.2	.439	–	.714	2.4	3.4	–	–	6.6
1973–74	Golden State	79	–	27.0	.512	–	.739	**4.9**	3.8	1.3	**0.1**	10.2
1974–75†	Golden State	**82**	–	30.7	**.528**	–	**.832**	3.9	4.2	**1.6**	**0.1**	12.8
1975–76	Cleveland	15	–	17.0	.389	–	.730	2.9	3.0	0.7	**0.1**	6.5
1975–76	New York	60	–	24.2	.475	–	.755	4.5	2.9	1.2	**0.1**	8.4
1976–77	New York	70	–	15.5	.505	–	.688	2.3	2.1	0.8	**0.1**	5.3
1977–78	New York	79	–	25.1	.502	–	.806	3.3	4.3	1.5	0.0	9.4
1978–79	New York	7	–	12.1	.423	–	.000	1.4	2.7	1.0	0.0	3.1
Career		605	–	23.6	.487	–	.771	3.4	3.6	1.3	0.1	9.3

=== Playoffs ===
Year	Team	GP	GS	MPG	FG%	3P%	FT%	RPG	APG	SPG	BPG	PPG
1969–70	Atlanta	9	–	16.2	.477	–	**.731**	2.9	0.9	–	–	9.0
1974–75†	Golden State	**17***	–	26.4	.411	–	.642	**4.2**	3.1	1.4	0.1	**9.1**
1977–78	New York	6	–	**26.7**	**.500**	–	.600	3.5	**4.5**	**1.7**	**0.3**	9.0
Career		32	–	23.6	.444	–	.663	3.7	2.8	1.5	0.2	9.0

== Head coaching record ==
=== NBA ===
Team	Year	G	W	L	W–L%	Finish	PG	PW	PL	PW–L%	Result
New Jersey	1994–95	82	30	52	.366	5th in Atlantic	—	—	—	—	Missed playoffs
New Jersey	1995–96	82	30	52	.366	5th in Atlantic	—	—	—	—	Missed playoffs
Career		164	60	104	.366		0	0	0	–	

== Bibliography ==
- Butch Beard's Basic Basketball: The Complete Player (M. Kesend, 1994), ISBN 978-0935576481

== See also ==
- List of NBA single-game steals leaders
