= Charles Johnson (basketball, born 1949) =

American basketball player (1949–2007)

Personal information
- Born: March 31, 1949 Corpus Christi, Texas, U.S.
- Died: June 1, 2007 (aged 58) Oakland, California, U.S.
- Listed height: 6 ft 0 in (1.83 m)
- Listed weight: 170 lb (77 kg)

Career information
- High school: Sequoia (Redwood City, California)
- College: California (1968–1971)
- NBA draft: 1971: 6th round, 93rd overall pick
- Drafted by: Golden State Warriors
- Playing career: 1972–1979
- Position: Point guard
- Number: 10, 15

Career history
- 1972–1978: Golden State Warriors
- 1978–1979: Washington Bullets

Career highlights
- 2× NBA champion (1975, 1978); First-team All-Pac-8 (1969)

Career statistics
- Points: 4,241 (8.1 ppg)
- Rebounds: 1,318 (2.5 rpg)
- Assists: 973 (1.9 apg)
- Stats at NBA.com
- Stats at Basketball Reference

Charles Johnson (March 31, 1949 – June 1, 2007) was an American professional basketball player for the Golden State Warriors and the Washington Bullets of the National Basketball Association (NBA). He was an alumnus of Sequoia High School and then scored 1,000 points in three years playing college basketball for the California Golden Bears.

The San Francisco Warriors drafted Johnson in the 6th round of the 1971 NBA draft. The 6-foot-0, 170-pound point guard played with the Warriors for five seasons and part of a sixth until he was waived in early January 1978. Johnson was a member of the 1974–75 Warriors NBA championship team.

After his release, Johnson was signed by the Washington Bullets in January, 1978, after a season-ending injury to Phil Chenier. Johnson averaged 8.3 points, 2.4 rebounds and 2.1 assists as a member of the 1977–78 NBA Championship team.

Elvin Hayes attributed the Bullets championship run to the acquisition of Johnson. In the last four games of the 1978 NBA finals against the Seattle SuperSonics, Johnson scored 80 points and helped Washington win the series 4 games to 3. The Bullets topped the Atlanta Hawks, San Antonio Spurs and Philadelphia 76ers to reach the championship round.

Johnson died of cancer on June 1, 2007, aged 58.

== Career statistics ==
Legend
GP	Games played	GS	Games started	MPG	Minutes per game
FG%	Field goal percentage	3P%	3-point field goal percentage	FT%	Free throw percentage
RPG	Rebounds per game	APG	Assists per game	SPG	Steals per game
BPG	Blocks per game	PPG	Points per game	**Bold**	Career high
†	Won an NBA championship	*	Led the league

=== NBA ===
==== Regular season ====
Year	Team	GP	MPG	FG%	FT%	RPG	APG	SPG	BPG	PPG
1972–73	Golden State	70	12.7	.428	.717	1.9	1.7			5.4
1973–74	Golden State	59	17.8	.415	.691	3.0	1.7	1.1	**.1**	7.2
1974–75†	Golden State	79	**27.5**	.412	.735	**3.9**	**2.9**	**1.7**	**.1**	**10.2**
1975–76	Golden State	81	19.1	**.467**	.759	2.5	1.5	1.2	.1	9.2
1976–77	Golden State	79	15.1	.437	.710	1.8	1.2	1.1	**.1**	7.1
1977–78	Golden State	32	15.4	.409	.700	1.9	1.5	1.0	**.1**	6.2
1977–78†	Washington	39	20.7	.408	.824	2.4	2.1	.8	.0	8.3
1978–79	Washington	**82***	22.2	.435	.848	2.5	2.2	1.2	**.1**	9.2
Career		521	19.1	.429	.756	2.5	1.9	1.2	.1	8.1

==== Playoffs ====
Year	Team	GP	MPG	FG%	FT%	RPG	APG	SPG	BPG	PPG
1973	Golden State	6	11.7	.385	.500	1.7	1.8			3.8
1975†	Golden State	17*	**29.9**	**.420**	.750	**3.5**	2.1	1.5	**.4**	**12.5**
1976	Golden State	13	21.8	.409	.842	2.7	1.5	**1.7**	.0	9.2
1977	Golden State	10	16.1	.392	**.875**	1.5	.7	.8	.1	6.5
1978†	Washington	**21**	20.2	.406	.784	2.5	**2.3**	1.4	.0	10.2
1979	Washington	18	15.3	.336	.538	1.9	1.2	.2	.2	4.8
Career		85	20.3	.398	.748	2.4	1.7	1.1	.1	8.5
