= George T. Johnson =

American basketball player (1948)

Personal information
- Born: December 18, 1948 (age 77) Tylertown, Mississippi, U.S.
- Listed height: 6 ft 11 in (2.11 m)
- Listed weight: 205 lb (93 kg)

Career information
- High school: Gulledge (Tylertown, Mississippi)
- College: Dillard (1966–1970)
- NBA draft: 1970: 5th round, 79th overall pick
- Drafted by: Chicago Bulls
- Playing career: 1972–1986
- Position: Center / power forward
- Number: 52, 43

Career history
- 1972–1977: Golden State Warriors
- 1977: Buffalo Braves
- 1977–1980: New Jersey Nets
- 1980–1982: San Antonio Spurs
- 1982–1983: Atlanta Hawks
- 1984–1985: New Jersey Nets
- 1985–1986: Seattle SuperSonics

Career highlights
- NBA champion (1975); NBA All-Defensive Second Team (1981); 3× NBA blocks leader (1978, 1981, 1982)

Career statistics
- Points: 4,369 (4.8 ppg)
- Rebounds: 5,887 (6.5 rpg)
- Blocks: 2,082 (2.5 bpg)
- Stats at NBA.com
- Stats at Basketball Reference

George Thomas Johnson (born December 18, 1948) is an American retired professional basketball player. A 6'11" power forward/center born in Tylertown, Mississippi and from Dillard University, he played in 13 National Basketball Association (NBA) seasons (1972–1983; 1984–1986) as a member of the Golden State Warriors, the Buffalo Braves, the New Jersey Nets, the San Antonio Spurs, the Atlanta Hawks, and the Seattle SuperSonics.

Johnson was a key reserve on the Warriors team that won the NBA Championship in 1975, and he grabbed 5,887 rebounds in his career. Johnson led the NBA in blocked shots per game three times, led the NBA in disqualifications in 1977–78 with 20, and was named to the NBA All-Defensive Second Team in 1980–81. He blocked at least 10 shots in a game six times during his NBA career.

Johnson recorded the first five-by-five in NBA history, and is one of only twelve players to accomplish one. On March 26, 1978, he had 15 points, 18 rebounds, 5 assists, 5 steals and 7 blocks in a 118–104 victory over the Washington Bullets.

In 1981–82, Johnson started 62 games for the Spurs, helping them win the Midwest Division championship and reach the Western Conference finals. After San Antonio was swept by the eventual champion Los Angeles Lakers in a series in which Johnson was badly outplayed by Kareem Abdul-Jabbar, Spurs coach Stan Albeck determined the team was seriously deficient in the low post. Albeck sought a premier center, and got it by trading for Chicago Bulls All-Star Artis Gilmore, signaling the end of Johnson's time in San Antonio.

Inspired by his teammate Rick Barry, Johnson shot his free throws underhanded.

== NBA career statistics ==
Legend
GP	Games played	GS	Games started	MPG	Minutes per game
FG%	Field goal percentage	3P%	3-point field goal percentage	FT%	Free throw percentage
RPG	Rebounds per game	APG	Assists per game	SPG	Steals per game
BPG	Blocks per game	PPG	Points per game	**Bold**	Career high
†	Won an NBA championship	*	Led the league

=== Regular season ===
Year	Team	GP	GS	MPG	FG%	3P%	FT%	RPG	APG	SPG	BPG	PPG
1972–73	Golden State	56	–	6.2	.410	–	.412	2.5	0.1	–	–	1.6
1973–74	Golden State	66	–	19.6	.483	–	.551	7.9	1.1	0.5	1.9	6.1
1974–75†	Golden State	**82**	–	17.5	.476	–	.659	7.0	0.8	0.4	1.7	4.4
1975–76	Golden State	**82**	–	21.3	.484	–	.673	7.6	1.0	0.6	2.1	4.9
1976–77	Golden State	39	–	15.3	.487	–	.806	5.4	0.7	0.4	1.9	4.4
1976–77	Buffalo	39	–	27.1	.448	–	.687	**10.3**	2.0	0.6	2.7	7.6
1977–78	New Jersey	81	–	**29.8**	.395	–	.719	9.6	1.4	**1.0**	**3.4***	**8.7**
1978–79	New Jersey	78	–	26.4	.427	–	.761	7.9	1.1	0.9	3.2	6.6
1979–80	New Jersey	81	–	26.2	.457	.000	.706	7.4	**2.1**	0.7	3.2	7.2
1980–81	San Antonio	**82**	–	23.6	.473	–	.734	7.3	1.1	0.6	**3.4***	5.0
1981–82	San Antonio	75	62	21.0	.467	–	.672	6.1	1.1	0.3	3.1*	3.0
1982–83	Atlanta	37	0	12.5	.439	–	.737	3.2	0.5	0.3	1.6	1.7
1984–85	New Jersey	65	0	12.3	**.532**	**1.000**	**.815**	2.8	0.3	0.3	1.2	1.6
1985–86	Seattle	41	0	6.4	.522	–	.688	1.5	0.3	0.1	0.9	0.9
Career		904	62	20.0	.451	.500	.694	6.5	1.0	0.5	2.5	4.8

=== Playoffs ===
Year	Team	GP	GS	MPG	FG%	3P%	FT%	RPG	APG	SPG	BPG	PPG
1973	Golden State	9	–	5.0	.400	–	.250	1.6	0.3	–	–	1.4
1975†	Golden State	**17**	–	18.9	.571	–	.593	7.4	0.9	0.5	2.4	5.2
1976	Golden State	13	–	20.1	.574	–	**.737**	6.7	**1.3**	**1.1**	1.8	5.8
1979	New Jersey	2	–	**35.0**	**.667**	–	.333	**12.5**	1.0	1.0	**3.5**	**14.5**
1981	San Antonio	7	–	23.6	.462	–	.700	9.0	0.9	0.4	2.3	4.4
1982	San Antonio	9	–	19.4	.500	–	.600	5.1	**1.3**	0.7	1.7	1.2
1983	Atlanta	1	0	4.0	–	–	–	0.0	0.0	0.0	0.0	0.0
Career		59	0	17.7	.551	–	.618	6.1	0.9	0.7	2.0	4.2

== See also ==
- List of NBA career blocks leaders
- List of NBA annual blocks leaders
- List of NBA single-game rebounding leaders
- List of NBA single-game blocks leaders
