= Derrek Dickey =

American basketball player and sportscaster

Personal information
- Born: March 20, 1951 Cincinnati, Ohio, U.S.
- Died: June 25, 2002 (aged 51) Sacramento, California, U.S.
- Listed height: 6 ft 7 in (2.01 m)
- Listed weight: 218 lb (99 kg)

Career information
- High school: Purcell (Cincinnati, Ohio)
- College: Cincinnati (1970–1973)
- NBA draft: 1973: 2nd round, 29th overall pick
- Drafted by: Golden State Warriors
- Playing career: 1973–1978
- Position: Power forward
- Number: 40

Career history
- 1973–1978: Golden State Warriors
- 1978: Chicago Bulls

Career highlights
- NBA champion (1975)

Career statistics
- Points: 1,962 (6.1 ppg)
- Rebounds: 1,575 (4.9 rpg)
- Assists: 346 (1.1 apg)
- Stats at NBA.com
- Stats at Basketball Reference

Derrek Dickey (March 20, 1951 – June 25, 2002) was an American professional basketball player and sportscaster.

Dickey was born in Cincinnati, the son of John and Ola Dickey. A 6'7" forward, Dickey starred at Purcell High School (now Purcell Marian High School) in Cincinnati, where he led the city in scoring in 1968–69. He earned first-team All-Ohio honors.

He played basketball at the University of Cincinnati for three varsity seasons (1970–71 through 1972–73; freshmen were not eligible in 1969–70). For his college career, he averaged 17.0 points and 11.0 rebounds per game.

He led the team in rebounding all three seasons with averages of 12.1, 10.9 and 10.0, and he led once in scoring with 17.9 points per game, as a sophomore. He was a team captain both his junior and senior years. The Bearcats had a record of 48–30 during his three seasons.

Dickey was selected by the Golden State Warriors in the second round of the 1973 NBA draft. Dickey played five seasons in the NBA with the Warriors and the Chicago Bulls, averaging 6.1 points per game and 4.9 rebounds per game. He was a key contributor on the 1975 Warriors team that won the NBA Championship during which Dickey set personal bests of 23.2 minutes per game, 7.7 points, 6.9 rebounds, and 1.6 assists. His field goal percentage was .482.

After his playing career ended, Dickey served as a color commentator on telecasts of University of Cincinnati basketball games. He also held stints as an analyst for the Sacramento Kings and the Chicago Bulls as well as ESPN.

In 1988, he was inducted into the University of Cincinnati Athletic Hall of Fame.

Dickey suffered a stroke in 1997 and lost the use of his left arm and leg. Through rehabilitation, he regained his ability to walk and resumed his broadcasting duties. He also became a volunteer for the American Heart Association.

In 2002, Dickey died of heart failure at his home in Sacramento.

== Career statistics ==
Legend
GP	Games played	GS	Games started	MPG	Minutes per game
FG%	Field goal percentage	3P%	3-point field goal percentage	FT%	Free throw percentage
RPG	Rebounds per game	APG	Assists per game	SPG	Steals per game
BPG	Blocks per game	PPG	Points per game	**Bold**	Career high
†	Won an NBA championship

=== NBA ===
==== Regular season ====
Year	Team	GP	GS	MPG	FG%	FT%	RPG	APG	SPG	BPG	PPG
1973–74	Golden State	66		14.1	**.494**	.773	5.1	.8	.3	**.2**	4.3
1974–75†	Golden State	**80**		**23.2**	.482	.667	**6.9**	**1.6**	**.7**	**.2**	**7.7**
1975–76	Golden State	79		15.3	.465	.785	4.4	1.1	.3	.1	6.4
1976–77	Golden State	49		17.5	.458	.738	4.9	1.3	.4	**.2**	7.4
1977–78	Golden State	22		12.4	.462	**.941**	2.2	.5	.5	.1	6.2
1977–78	Chicago	25	**1**	8.8	.397	.737	1.9	.4	.2	.1	2.7
Career		321	1	16.7	.470	.745	4.9	1.1	.4	.2	6.1

==== Playoffs ====
Year	Team	GP	MPG	FG%	FT%	RPG	APG	SPG	BPG	PPG
1975†	Golden State	**15**	**17.1**	**.603**	.563	**4.9**	**.7**	**.5**	.0	**6.9**
1976	Golden State	12	14.4	.500	**.824**	3.5	.5	.2	**.1**	6.3
Career		27	15.9	.557	.697	4.3	.6	.4	.0	6.6
