= 1974–75 Golden State Warriors season =

Professional basketball team season (won NBA championship)

- NBA champions
- Conference champions
- Division champions
- Head coach: Al Attles
- Arena: Oakland Coliseum Arena; Cow Palace

Results
- Record: 48–34 (.585)
- Place: Division: 1st (Pacific); Conference: 1st (Western)
- Playoff finish: NBA champions (Defeated Bullets 4–0)
- Stats at Basketball Reference

Local media
- Television: KTVU
- Radio: KNBR

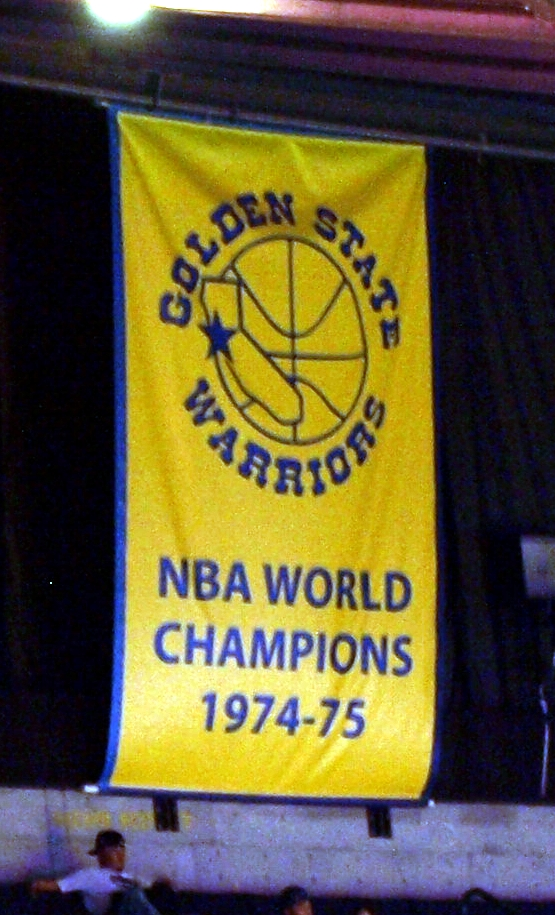
The Warriors' 1975 championship banner.

The 1974–75 Golden State Warriors season was the 29th season in the franchise's history, its 13th in California and the fourth playing in Oakland. After four seasons of second-place division finishes, the Warriors made various changes. Nate Thurmond was traded to the Chicago Bulls for Clifford Ray, a young defensive center. The club drafted Keith Wilkes (later known as Jamaal Wilkes), whose nickname was "Silk". Cazzie Russell had played out his option and joined the Los Angeles Lakers, leaving Rick Barry as the team's leader. Coach Al Attles implemented a team-oriented system that drew on the contributions of as many as ten players during a game. Barry scored 30.6 points per game, led the NBA in free throw percentage and steals per game, and was sixth in the league in assists per game. The Warriors captured the Pacific Division title with a 48–34 record. This was the Warriors’ third championship, and first since they were in Philadelphia in 1956.

In the playoffs, the Warriors got to the Western Conference Finals by beating the Seattle SuperSonics in six games. In the Western Finals, the Warriors looked like they were about to lose to former teammate Nate Thurmond. The Warriors found themselves down against the Chicago Bulls 3 games to 2. The Warriors rallied to win Game 6 in Chicago and took the series with an 83–79 Game 7 triumph in Oakland. In the NBA Finals, the Warriors faced off against the Washington Bullets. The Warriors took the series in four straight games, including 1-point wins in Games 2 and 4. Rick Barry was named the finals MVP.

The Warriors would not make another NBA Finals appearance again until 2015, where the team faced off against the Cleveland Cavaliers and won its fourth league title. They would also go on to defeat the Cavaliers in 2017 and 2018, and would not win another championship after that until 2022, where they defeated the Boston Celtics.

== Offseason ==
=== Draft picks ===
Round	Pick	Player	Position	Nationality	College
1	11	Keith Wilkes (Note: Later known as Jamaal Wilkes)	F	United States	UCLA
2	29	Phil Smith	G	United States	San Francisco
3	47	Frank Kendrick	F	United States	Purdue
4	65	Willie Biles	G	United States	Tulsa
5	83	Steve Erickson		United States	Oregon
6	101	John Errecart	G	United States	Pacific
7	119	Brady Allen		United States	California
8	137	Clarence Allen		United States	UC Santa Barbara
9	155	Carl Meier		United States	California
10	172	Marvin Buckley		United States	Nevada

== Roster ==
1974–75 Golden State Warriors roster
Players

Pos.	No.	Player	Height	Weight	DOB	From
SF	24	Rick Barry	6 ft 7 in (2.01 m)	205 lb (93 kg)		Miami (FL)
G	21	Butch Beard	6 ft 3 in (1.91 m)	185 lb (84 kg)		Louisville
G	22	Steve Bracey	6 ft 2 in (1.88 m)	175 lb (79 kg)		Tulsa
PF	32	Bill Bridges	6 ft 6 in (1.98 m)	228 lb (103 kg)		Kansas
PF	40	Derrek Dickey	6 ft 7 in (2.01 m)	218 lb (99 kg)		Cincinnati
PG	15	Charles Dudley	6 ft 2 in (1.88 m)	180 lb (82 kg)		Washington
G	10	Charles Johnson	6 ft 0 in (1.83 m)	170 lb (77 kg)		California
C	52	George Johnson	6 ft 11 in (2.11 m)	205 lb (93 kg)		Dillard
SG	23	Jeff Mullins	6 ft 4 in (1.93 m)	190 lb (86 kg)		Duke
C	44	Clifford Ray	6 ft 9 in (2.06 m)	230 lb (104 kg)		Oklahoma
SG	20	Phil Smith	6 ft 4 in (1.93 m)	185 lb (84 kg)		San Francisco
F	41	Jamaal Wilkes	6 ft 6 in (1.98 m)	190 lb (86 kg)		UCLA

Coaches
Head coach
- Al Attles (North Carolina A&T)
Assistant(s)
- Joe Roberts (Ohio State)

Legend
- (DP) Unsigned draft pick
- (FA) Free agent
- (S) Suspended
- Injured

== Regular season ==
=== Season standings ===
Pacific Division	W	L	PCT	GB	Home	Road	Div
y-Golden State Warriors	48	34	.585	–	31–10	17–24	19–11
x-Seattle SuperSonics	43	39	.524	5	24–16	19–23	18–12
Portland Trail Blazers	38	44	.463	10	29–13	9–31	16–14
Phoenix Suns	32	50	.390	16	22–19	10–31	12–18
Los Angeles Lakers	30	52	.366	18	21–20	9–32	10–20

#	Western Conference				
#	Team	W	L	PCT	GB
1	z-Golden State Warriors	48	34	.585	–
2	y-Chicago Bulls	47	35	.573	1
3	x-Kansas City–Omaha Kings	44	38	.537	4
4	x-Seattle SuperSonics	43	39	.524	5
5	x-Detroit Pistons	40	42	.488	8
6	Portland Trail Blazers	38	44	.463	10
6	Milwaukee Bucks	38	44	.463	10
8	Phoenix Suns	32	50	.390	16
9	Los Angeles Lakers	30	52	.366	18

=== Season schedule ===
1974–75 game log
Total: 48–34 (home: 31–10; road: 17–24)
October: 4–2 (home: 3–1; road: 1–1)

Game	Date	Team	Score	High points	High rebounds	High assists	Location Attendance	Record
1	October 18	@ Los Angeles	90–105	Butch Beard (18)	Dickey, Ray (9)	Clifford Ray (7)	The Forum; 12,772	0–1
2	October 19	Cleveland	110–113	Rick Barry (48)	Clifford Ray (13)	Butch Beard (10)	Oakland-Alameda County Coliseum Arena; 4,402	1–1
3	October 22	Portland	107–106	Rick Barry (34)	Clifford Ray (16)	Rick Barry (6)	Oakland-Alameda County Coliseum Arena; 5,717	1–2
4	October 25	@ Portland	99–97	Rick Barry (34)	Rick Barry (13)	Charles Johnson (7)	Memorial Coliseum; 10,954	2–2
5	October 26	Detroit	104–105	Rick Barry (34)	Clifford Ray (11)	Rick Barry (6)	Oakland-Alameda County Coliseum Arena; 5,436	3–2
6	October 29	Buffalo	101–130	Rick Barry (30)	George Johnson (15)	Rick Barry (11)	Oakland-Alameda County Coliseum Arena; 4,221	4–2

November: 11–4 (home: 5–2; road: 6–2)

Game	Date	Team	Score	High points	High rebounds	High assists	Location Attendance	Record
7	November 1	@ Seattle	99–88	Rick Barry (45)	Clifford Ray (13)	Rick Barry (6)	Seattle Center Coliseum; 12,777	5–2
8	November 2	Milwaukee	90–99	Rick Barry (22)	George Johnson (10)	Rick Barry (9)	Oakland-Alameda County Coliseum Arena; 7,570	6–2
9	November 3	@ Portland	109–100	Rick Barry (41)	George Johnson (14)	Rick Barry (10)	Memorial Coliseum; 10,494	7–2
10	November 7	Seattle	104–93	Jamaal Wilkes (27)	Jamaal Wilkes (15)	Rick Barry (11)	Oakland-Alameda County Coliseum Arena; 5,391	7–3
11	November 9	New York	93–97	Rick Barry (32)	George Johnson (15)	Rick Barry (5)	Oakland-Alameda County Coliseum Arena; 9,556	8–3
12	November 10	@ Los Angeles	106–103	Rick Barry (23)	Clifford Ray (11)	Rick Barry (7)	The Forum; 11,328	9–3
13	November 12	Atlanta	111–128	Rick Barry (33)	George Johnson (10)	Rick Barry (5)	Oakland-Alameda County Coliseum Arena; 4,970	10–3
14	November 16	Philadelphia	106–102	Rick Barry (31)	Clifford Ray (17)	Rick Barry (7)	Oakland-Alameda County Coliseum Arena; 8,345	10–4
15	November 17	@ Phoenix	106–105	Rick Barry (36)	Dickey, Ray (10)	Charles Johnson (9)	Arizona Veterans Memorial Coliseum; 5,471	11–4
16	November 19	@ Buffalo	106–111	Rick Barry (31)	Charles Johnson (11)	Butch Beard (9)	Buffalo Memorial Auditorium; 8,529	11–5
17	November 20	@ Boston	120–115	Rick Barry (42)	Clifford Ray (14)	Rick Barry (5)	Providence Civic Center; 3,509	12–5
18	November 21	@ Cleveland	74–106	Rick Barry (23)	Jamaal Wilkes (15)	Rick Barry (4)	Richfield Coliseum; 5,811	12–6
19	November 23	@ Detroit	110–98	Rick Barry (45)	Clifford Ray (9)	Butch Beard (7)	Cobo Arena; 6,902	13–6
20	November 26	Houston	124–144	Rick Barry (37)	George Johnson (12)	Rick Barry (8)	Oakland-Alameda County Coliseum Arena; 6,015	14–6
21	November 30	Los Angeles	118–128	Rick Barry (43)	George Johnson (14)	Rick Barry (7)	Oakland-Alameda County Coliseum Arena; 2,576	15–6

December: 8–6 (home: 5–1; road: 3–5)

Game	Date	Team	Score	High points	High rebounds	High assists	Location Attendance	Record
22	December 3	New Orleans	101–122	Rick Barry (32)	George Johnson (14)	Butch Beard (7)	Oakland-Alameda County Coliseum Arena; 5,081	16–6
23	December 5	@ Phoenix	106–108 (2OT)	Rick Barry (30)	Clifford Ray (13)	Beard, Ray (9)	Arizona Veterans Memorial Coliseum; 6,053	16–7
24	December 7	Seattle	96–132	Rick Barry (26)	George Johnson (15)	Rick Barry (10)	Oakland-Alameda County Coliseum Arena; 12,608	17–7
25	December 10	@ Houston	97–111	Rick Barry (29)	Clifford Ray (9)	Rick Barry (10)	Hofheinz Pavilion; 2,146	17–8
26	December 11	@ New Orleans	103–106	Rick Barry (38)	George Johnson (10)	Rick Barry (8)	Municipal Auditorium; 3,731	17–9
27	December 12	@ Atlanta	129–109	Rick Barry (41)	Ray, Wilkes (9)	Rick Barry (10)	Omni Coliseum; 3,745	18–9
28	December 14	@ Washington	91–99	Rick Barry (29)	George Johnson (17)	Barry, Beard (4)	Capital Centre; 10,396	18–10
29	December 17	@ New York	126–108	Rick Barry (44)	Clifford Ray (11)	Butch Beard (10)	Madison Square Garden; 19,694	19–10
30	December 20	@ Philadelphia	94–93	Rick Barry (29)	Jamaal Wilkes (16)	Rick Barry (7)	The Spectrum; 6,292	20–10
31	December 21	@ Kansas City–Omaha	84–107	Rick Barry (30)	Clifford Ray (9)	Jamaal Wilkes (5)	Kemper Arena; 5,668	20–11
32	December 23	Phoenix	94–111	Rick Barry (43)	Clifford Ray (18)	Rick Barry (7)	Oakland-Alameda County Coliseum Arena; 5,240	21–11
33	December 26	Portland	101–112	Rick Barry (46)	Dickey, Wilkes (10)	Rick Barry (10)	Oakland-Alameda County Coliseum Arena; 10,983	22–11
34	December 28	Boston	115–105	Rick Barry (37)	Clifford Ray (13)	Rick Barry (9)	Oakland-Alameda County Coliseum Arena; 12,787	22–12
35	December 30	Kansas City–Omaha	102–110	Rick Barry (39)	Clifford Ray (15)	Rick Barry (9)	Oakland-Alameda County Coliseum Arena; 7,374	23–12

January: 7–7 (home: 6–1; road: 1–6)

Game	Date	Team	Score	High points	High rebounds	High assists	Location Attendance	Record
36	January 4	Washington	96–104	Mullins, Wilkes (19)	George Johnson (12)	Butch Beard (7)	Oakland-Alameda County Coliseum Arena; 12,787	24–12
37	January 7	New Orleans	94–136	Rick Barry (29)	Jamaal Wilkes (12)	Rick Barry (9)	Oakland-Alameda County Coliseum Arena; 4,164	25–12
38	January 9	New York	96–132	Rick Barry (33)	Derrek Dickey (13)	Derrek Dickey (6)	Oakland-Alameda County Coliseum Arena; 12,392	26–12
39	January 10	@ Seattle	119–94	Rick Barry (26)	Dickey, Ray (13)	Jeff Mullins (7)	Seattle Center Coliseum; 14,055	27–12
40	January 11	Chicago	114–105	Rick Barry (40)	Clifford Ray (13)	Rick Barry (5)	Oakland-Alameda County Coliseum Arena; 12,787	27–13
41	January 16	@ Milwaukee	100–119	Rick Barry (26)	Clifford Ray (13)	Rick Barry (6)	MECCA Arena; 10,089	27–14
42	January 17	@ Buffalo	116–121	Rick Barry (35)	Jamaal Wilkes (9)	Rick Barry (7)	Buffalo Memorial Auditorium; 13,727	27–15
43	January 18	@ Washington	101–125	Charles Johnson (21)	George Johnson (11)	Rick Barry (7)	Capital Centre; 19,035	27–16
44	January 21	Los Angeles	108–138	Rick Barry (38)	Clifford Ray (17)	Jeff Mullins (6)	Oakland-Alameda County Coliseum Arena; 7,847	28–16
45	January 23	Philadelphia	100–108	Rick Barry (55)	George Johnson (17)	Butch Beard (6)	Oakland-Alameda County Coliseum Arena; 7,070	29–16
46	January 25	Portland	109–114 (OT)	Rick Barry (32)	G. Johnson, Ray (11)	Dickey, Smith (5)	Oakland-Alameda County Coliseum Arena; 12,732	30–16
47	January 26	@ Portland	113–128	Rick Barry (36)	Clifford Ray (15)	Butch Beard (6)	Memorial Coliseum; 10,231	30–17
48	January 29	@ Detroit	90–93	Rick Barry (25)	Clifford Ray (12)	Rick Barry (8)	Cobo Arena; 9,538	30–18
49	January 31	@ Chicago	103–127	Rick Barry (40)	Jamaal Wilkes (13)	Beard, Dudley (5)	Chicago Stadium; 13,208	30–19

February: 6–8 (home: 3–3; road: 3–5)

Game	Date	Team	Score	High points	High rebounds	High assists	Location Attendance	Record
50	February 2	@ Kansas City–Omaha	101–127	Rick Barry (34)	Derrek Dickey (12)	Butch Beard (4)	Kemper Arena; 9,365	30–20
51	February 4	@ Houston	107–105	Rick Barry (38)	Clifford Ray (9)	Barry, Beard, Mullins (5)	Hofheinz Pavilion; 3,173	31–20
52	February 6	Washington	98–97	Rick Barry (34)	Clifford Ray (19)	Rick Barry (8)	Oakland-Alameda County Coliseum Arena; 12,787	31–21
53	February 8	Phoenix	96–105	Phil Smith (22)	Clifford Ray (14)	Rick Barry (11)	Oakland-Alameda County Coliseum Arena; 8,961	32–21
54	February 11	Houston	112–108 (OT)	Rick Barry (30)	Ray, Wilkes (14)	Rick Barry (7)	Oakland-Alameda County Coliseum Arena; 5,775	32–22
55	February 13	@ Cleveland	93–96	Barry, Wilkes (20)	Clifford Ray (11)	Clifford Ray (5)	Richfield Coliseum; 9,062	32–23
56	February 14	@ Chicago	87–105	Rick Barry (23)	Clifford Ray (16)	Rick Barry (4)	Chicago Stadium; 10,126	32–24
57	February 15	@ Philadelphia	108–101	Rick Barry (37)	Clifford Ray (18)	Charles Dudley (11)	The Spectrum; 5,695	33–24
58	February 18	@ New York	98–99	Butch Beard (20)	Clifford Ray (11)	Rick Barry (6)	Madison Square Garden; 19,694	33–25
59	February 20	Atlanta	102–108	Phil Smith (26)	Clifford Ray (16)	Rick Barry (5)	Oakland-Alameda County Coliseum Arena; 5,570	34–25
60	February 21	@ Los Angeles	105–93	Phil Smith (26)	Jamaal Wilkes (14)	Butch Beard (9)	The Forum; 11,950	35–25
61	February 22	Boston	108–114	Rick Barry (42)	Clifford Ray (12)	Barry, Dudley (5)	Oakland-Alameda County Coliseum Arena; 12,961	36–25
62	February 25	Phoenix	111–97	Rick Barry (31)	Derrek Dickey (16)	Rick Barry (3)	Oakland-Alameda County Coliseum Arena; 8,550	36–26
63	February 28	@ Phoenix	96–102	Barry, Beard (18)	Jamaal Wilkes (13)	C. Johnson, Ray (4)	Arizona Veterans Memorial Coliseum; 9,511	36–27

March: 11–6 (home: 9–1; road: 2–5)

Game	Date	Team	Score	High points	High rebounds	High assists	Location Attendance	Record
64	March 1	Cleveland	95–110	Rick Barry (23)	G. Johnson, Ray (10)	Butch Beard (5)	Oakland-Alameda County Coliseum Arena; 7,632	37–27
65	March 2	@ Portland	86–122	Jamaal Wilkes (25)	Clifford Ray (18)	Rick Barry (9)	Memorial Coliseum; 10,212	37–28
66	March 4	Chicago	102–117	Butch Beard (28)	George Johnson (11)	Rick Barry (9)	Oakland-Alameda County Coliseum Arena; 9,079	38–28
67	March 6	@ Atlanta	106–110	Rick Barry (28)	Clifford Ray (14)	Rick Barry (8)	Omni Coliseum; 2,625	38–29
68	March 7	@ New Orleans	107–110	Jamaal Wilkes (22)	George Johnson (9)	Rick Barry (10)	Municipal Auditorium; 6,218	38–30
69	March 9	@ Boston	102–101	Rick Barry (31)	Jamaal Wilkes (13)	Butch Beard (9)	Boston Garden; 15,320	39–30
70	March 11	@ Milwaukee	107–90	Rick Barry (30)	Jamaal Wilkes (12)	Butch Beard (8)	MECCA Arena; 10,687	40–30
71	March 13	Buffalo	122–103	Rick Barry (29)	Jamaal Wilkes (12)	Rick Barry (10)	Oakland-Alameda County Coliseum Arena; 12,787	40–31
72	March 15	Seattle	84–120	Jamaal Wilkes (25)	Jamaal Wilkes (16)	Jamaal Wilkes (7)	Oakland-Alameda County Coliseum Arena; 9,594	41–31
73	March 16	@ Los Angeles	95–111	Jamaal Wilkes (31)	Derrek Dickey (13)	Butch Beard (6)	The Forum; 11,019	41–32
74	March 18	Phoenix	103–133	Rick Barry (28)	Jamaal Wilkes (14)	Phil Smith (6)	Oakland-Alameda County Coliseum Arena; 6,795	42–32
75	March 20	Portland	95–97	Butch Beard (29)	Clifford Ray (14)	Rick Barry (6)	Oakland-Alameda County Coliseum Arena; 5,141	43–32
76	March 22	Milwaukee	117–133	Rick Barry (38)	Clifford Ray (15)	Rick Barry (11)	Oakland-Alameda County Coliseum Arena; 12,787	44–32
77	March 25	Los Angeles	122–139	Rick Barry (40)	Dickey, G. Johnson (7)	Barry, Mullins, Smith (6)	Oakland-Alameda County Coliseum Arena; 7,806	45–32
78	March 27	Kansas City–Omaha	103–111	Rick Barry (34)	Derrek Dickey (23)	Rick Barry (8)	Oakland-Alameda County Coliseum Arena; 12,787	46–32
79	March 28	@ Seattle	92–96	Butch Beard (19)	Clifford Ray (9)	Rick Barry (5)	Seattle Center Coliseum; 14,082	46–33
80	March 29	Detroit	112–115	Rick Barry (26)	Clifford Ray (10)	Rick Barry (8)	Oakland-Alameda County Coliseum Arena; 12,787	47–33

April: 1–1 (home: 0–1; road: 1–0)

Game	Date	Team	Score	High points	High rebounds	High assists	Location Attendance	Record
81	April 4	@ Phoenix	128–99	Rick Barry (29)	Jamaal Wilkes (11)	Jeff Mullins (7)	Arizona Veterans Memorial Coliseum; 6,867	48–33
82	April 5	Seattle	109–108	Rick Barry (28)	George Johnson (17)	Barry, Beard (4)	Oakland-Alameda County Coliseum Arena; 11,064	48–34

Source: www.basketball-reference.com

== Playoffs ==
1975 playoff game log
Conference Semi-finals: 4–2 (home: 2–1; road: 2–1)

Game	Date	Team	Score	High points	High rebounds	High assists	Location Attendance	Series
1	April 14	Seattle	W 123–96	Rick Barry (39)	Clifford Ray (13)	Rick Barry (11)	Oakland–Alameda County Coliseum Arena; 12,279	1–0
2	April 16	Seattle	L 99–100	Rick Barry (29)	Ray, Dickey (10)	Barry, Beard (6)	Oakland–Alameda County Coliseum Arena; 12,787	1–1
3	April 17	@ Seattle	W 105–96	Rick Barry (33)	George Johnson (13)	Rick Barry (7)	Seattle Center Coliseum; 14,082	2–1
4	April 19	@ Seattle	L 94–111	Jamaal Wilkes (22)	Wilkes, Ray (9)	three players tied (3)	Seattle Center Coliseum; 14,082	2–2
5	April 22	Seattle	W 124–100	Jamaal Wilkes (24)	Ray, G. Johnson (13)	Rick Barry (10)	Oakland–Alameda County Coliseum Arena; 12,787	3–2
6	April 24	@ Seattle	W 105–96	Rick Barry (31)	George Johnson (15)	Charles Johnson (6)	Seattle Center Coliseum; 14,082	4–2

Conference Finals: 4–3 (home: 3–1; road: 1–2)

Game	Date	Team	Score	High points	High rebounds	High assists	Location Attendance	Series
1	April 27	Chicago	W 107–89	Rick Barry (38)	George Johnson (11)	Butch Beard (9)	Oakland–Alameda County Coliseum Arena; 12,787	1–0
2	April 30	@ Chicago	L 89–90	Rick Barry (26)	Clifford Ray (7)	Rick Barry (8)	Chicago Stadium; 18,533	1–1
3	May 4	@ Chicago	L 101–108	Butch Beard (28)	Rick Barry (7)	Rick Barry (9)	Chicago Stadium; 19,128	1–2
4	May 6	Chicago	W 111–106	Rick Barry (36)	Clifford Ray (18)	Rick Barry (9)	Oakland–Alameda County Coliseum Arena; 12,787	2–2
5	May 8	Chicago	L 79–89	Rick Barry (20)	Clifford Ray (12)	Rick Barry (4)	Oakland–Alameda County Coliseum Arena; 12,787	2–3
6	May 11	@ Chicago	W 86–72	Rick Barry (36)	Bill Bridges (11)	three players tied (3)	Chicago Stadium; 19,594	3–3
7	May 14	Chicago	W 83–79	Jamaal Wilkes (23)	Clifford Ray (12)	Rick Barry (4)	Oakland–Alameda County Coliseum Arena	4–3

NBA Finals: 4–0 (home: 2–0; road: 2–0)

Game	Date	Team	Score	High points	High rebounds	High assists	Location Attendance	Series
1	May 18	@ Washington	W 101–95	Rick Barry (24)	Clifford Ray (16)	Rick Barry (5)	Capital Centre; 19,035	1–0
2	May 20	Washington	W 92–91	Rick Barry (36)	Rick Barry (9)	three players tied (4)	Cow Palace; 13,225	2–0
3	May 23	Washington	W 109–101	Rick Barry (38)	Jamaal Wilkes (10)	Rick Barry (6)	Cow Palace; 13,225	3–0
4	May 25	@ Washington	W 96–95	Rick Barry (20)	Clifford Ray (11)	Rick Barry (5)	Capital Centre; 19,035	4–0

1975 schedule

== Awards and honors ==
- Rick Barry, NBA Finals Most Valuable Player Award
- Rick Barry, All-NBA First Team
- Rick Barry, NBA All-Star Game
- Jamaal Wilkes, NBA Rookie of the Year Award
- Jamaal Wilkes, NBA All-Rookie Team 1st Team
- Dick Vertlieb, NBA Executive of the Year Award
