= 1976–77 Golden State Warriors season =

NBA professional basketball team season

- Head coach: Al Attles
- General manager: Al Attles
- Owner: Franklin Mieuli
- Arena: Oakland-Alameda County Coliseum Arena

Results
- Record: 46–36 (.561)
- Place: Division: 3rd (Pacific); Conference: 4th (Western)
- Playoff finish: Conference Semi-finals (lost to Lakers 3–4)
- Stats at Basketball Reference

Local media
- Television: KTVU
- Radio: KNBR

The 1976–77 Golden State Warriors season was the Warriors' 31st season in the NBA and 14th in the San Francisco Bay Area. In the playoffs, the Warriors defeated the Detroit Pistons in the 1st round in three games before losing in the semi-finals in seven to the Los Angeles Lakers. The Warriors wouldn't return to the playoffs again until 1987.

== Draft picks ==
Round	Pick	Player	Position	Nationality	College
1	8	Robert Parish	C	United States	Centenary
1	17	Sonny Parker	SF/SG	United States	Texas A&M
2	34	Marshall Rogers	G	United States	Texas-Pan American
4	68	Jeff Fosnes		United States	Vanderbilt
5	86	Carl Bird		United States	California
6	91	Duane Barnett		United States	Stanford
6	104	Gene Cunningham		United States	Norfolk State
7	122	Jesse Campbell		United States	Mercyhurst
8	140	Stan Boskovich		United States	West Virginia
9	157	Howard Smith		United States	San Francisco
10	173	Ken Smith		United States	San Diego State

== Roster ==
1976–77 Golden State Warriors roster
Players

Pos.	No.	Player	Height	Weight	DOB	From
SF	24	Rick Barry	6 ft 7 in (2.01 m)	205 lb (93 kg)	1944-03-28	Miami (FL)
PF	42	Dwight Davis	6 ft 8 in (2.03 m)	220 lb (100 kg)	1949-10-28	Houston
PF	40	Derrek Dickey	6 ft 7 in (2.01 m)	218 lb (99 kg)	1951-03-20	Cincinnati
PG	15	Charles Dudley	6 ft 2 in (1.88 m)	180 lb (82 kg)	1950-03-05	Washington
PG	10	Charles Johnson	6 ft 0 in (1.83 m)	170 lb (77 kg)	1949-03-31	California
PF	43	Larry McNeill	6 ft 9 in (2.06 m)	195 lb (88 kg)	1951-01-31	Marquette
C	00	Robert Parish	7 ft 0 in (2.13 m)	230 lb (104 kg)	1953-08-30	Centenary
SF	22	Sonny Parker	6 ft 6 in (1.98 m)	200 lb (91 kg)	1955-03-22	Texas A&M
C	44	Clifford Ray	6 ft 9 in (2.06 m)	230 lb (104 kg)	1949-01-21	Oklahoma
PG	11	Marshall Rogers	6 ft 1 in (1.85 m)	190 lb (86 kg)	1953-08-27	Texas–Pan American
SG	20	Phil Smith	6 ft 4 in (1.93 m)	185 lb (84 kg)	1952-04-22	San Francisco
PF	41	Jamaal Wilkes	6 ft 6 in (1.98 m)	190 lb (86 kg)		UCLA
PG	1	Gus Williams	6 ft 2 in (1.88 m)	175 lb (79 kg)	1953-10-10	USC

Coaches
Head coach
- Al Attles
Assistant(s)
- Joe Roberts

Legend
- (DP) Unsigned draft pick
- (FA) Free agent
- (S) Suspended
- Injured

Roster
Updated: February 24, 1977

== Regular season ==
=== Season standings ===
Pacific Division	W	L	PCT	GB	Home	Road	Div
y-Los Angeles Lakers	53	29	.646	–	37–4	16–25	11–5
x-Portland Trail Blazers	49	33	.598	4	35–6	14–27	10–6
x-Golden State Warriors	46	36	.561	7	29–12	17–24	8–8
Seattle SuperSonics	40	42	.488	13	27–14	13–28	6–10
Phoenix Suns	34	48	.415	19	26–15	8–33	5–11

#	Western Conference				
#	Team	W	L	PCT	GB
1	z-Los Angeles Lakers	53	29	.646	–
2	y-Denver Nuggets	50	32	.610	3
3	x-Portland Trail Blazers	49	33	.598	4
4	x-Golden State Warriors	46	36	.561	7
5	x-Detroit Pistons	44	38	.537	9
6	x-Chicago Bulls	44	38	.537	9
7	Kansas City Kings	40	42	.488	13
8	Seattle SuperSonics	40	42	.488	13
9	Indiana Pacers	36	46	.439	17
10	Phoenix Suns	34	48	.415	19
11	Milwaukee Bucks	30	52	.366	23

z – clinched division title
y – clinched division title
x – clinched playoff spot

== Playoffs ==
1977 playoff game log
First round: 2–1 (home: 1–1; road: 1–0)

Game	Date	Team	Score	High points	High rebounds	High assists	Location Attendance	Series
1	April 12	Detroit	L 90–95	Rick Barry (31)	Clifford Ray (16)	Rick Barry (6)	Oakland–Alameda County Coliseum Arena; 12,459	0–1
2	April 14	@ Detroit	W 138–108	Phil Smith (35)	Parish, Ray (12)	Charles Dudley (14)	Cobo Arena; 11,220	1–1
3	April 17	Detroit	W 109–101	Rick Barry (35)	Robert Parish (18)	Barry, Dudley (7)	Oakland–Alameda County Coliseum Arena; 13,155	2–1

Conference Semi-finals: 3–4 (home: 3–0; road: 0–4)

Game	Date	Team	Score	High points	High rebounds	High assists	Location Attendance	Series
1	April 20	@ Los Angeles	L 106–115	Rick Barry (40)	Clifford Ray (13)	Charles Dudley (8)	The Forum; 15,928	0–1
2	April 22	@ Los Angeles	L 86–95	Wilkes, Parish (16)	Robert Parish (11)	Rick Barry (6)	The Forum; 17,505	0–2
3	April 24	Los Angeles	W 109–105	Rick Barry (40)	Clifford Ray (15)	Charles Dudley (7)	Oakland–Alameda County Coliseum Arena; 13,155	1–2
4	April 26	Los Angeles	W 114–103	Jamaal Wilkes (27)	Clifford Ray (15)	Charles Dudley (10)	Oakland–Alameda County Coliseum Arena; 13,155	2–2
5	April 29	@ Los Angeles	L 105–112	Rick Barry (28)	Wilkes, Parish (13)	Charles Dudley (6)	The Forum; 17,505	2–3
6	May 1	Los Angeles	W 115–106	Rick Barry (27)	Clifford Ray (11)	Charles Dudley (10)	Oakland–Alameda County Coliseum Arena; 13,155	3–3
7	May 4	@ Los Angeles	L 84–97	Jamaal Wilkes (24)	Clifford Ray (14)	Phil Smith (6)	The Forum; 17,505	3–4

1977 schedule

== Awards and records ==
- Jamaal Wilkes, NBA All-Defensive Second Team
- Rick Barry, NBA All-Star Game
