= Wardell =

Wardell can refer to:

== People ==
=== Given name ===
- Wardell Curry I or Dell Curry (born 1964), American retired basketball player
- Wardell Curry II or Stephen Curry (born 1988), American basketball player, son of Dell Curry
- Wardell Gray, American jazz saxophonist

=== Surname ===
- Brad Wardell (born 1971), American computer and video game designer
- Gareth Lodwig Wardell (born 1944), British politician
- Michael Wardell (1895–1978), British-born army officer and publisher
- William Wardell (1823–1899), Australian architect

== Places ==
- Wardell, Missouri, United States
- Wardell, New South Wales, Australia

== Other uses ==
- Wardell (band), an indie folk band
- Wardell, a member of the esports organisation TSM

== See also ==
- Wardell House (disambiguation)
- Wardle (disambiguation)
