= Wardle =

Wardle may refer to:

== Places ==
- Wardle, Greater Manchester, England
- Wardle, Cheshire, England

== People ==
=== In academia ===
- David Wardle (born 1959), English classicist
- Huon Wardle (born 1967), English anthropologist

=== In the arts ===
- Arthur Wardle (1864–1949), English painter
- John Joseph Wardle (born 1958), English musician
- Piers Wardle (1960–2009), English painter and conceptual artist
- Sarah Wardle (born 1969), English poet

=== In sport ===
- Ernie Wardle (1930–2013), English footballer
- Harry Wardle (1881–1918), English footballer
- Johnny Wardle (1923–1985), English cricketer

=== Other people ===
- Josh Wardle, Welsh software engineer
- Peter Wardle (1931–2008), New Zealand botanist
- Robert Arnold Wardle (1890–1974), Canadian zoologist
- Thomas Wardle (1912–1977), Australian businessman
- Thomas Erskine Wardle, (1877–1944), English naval officer

== See also ==
- Wardale
- Wardell (disambiguation)
