= Splash Brothers =

Duo of American basketball players

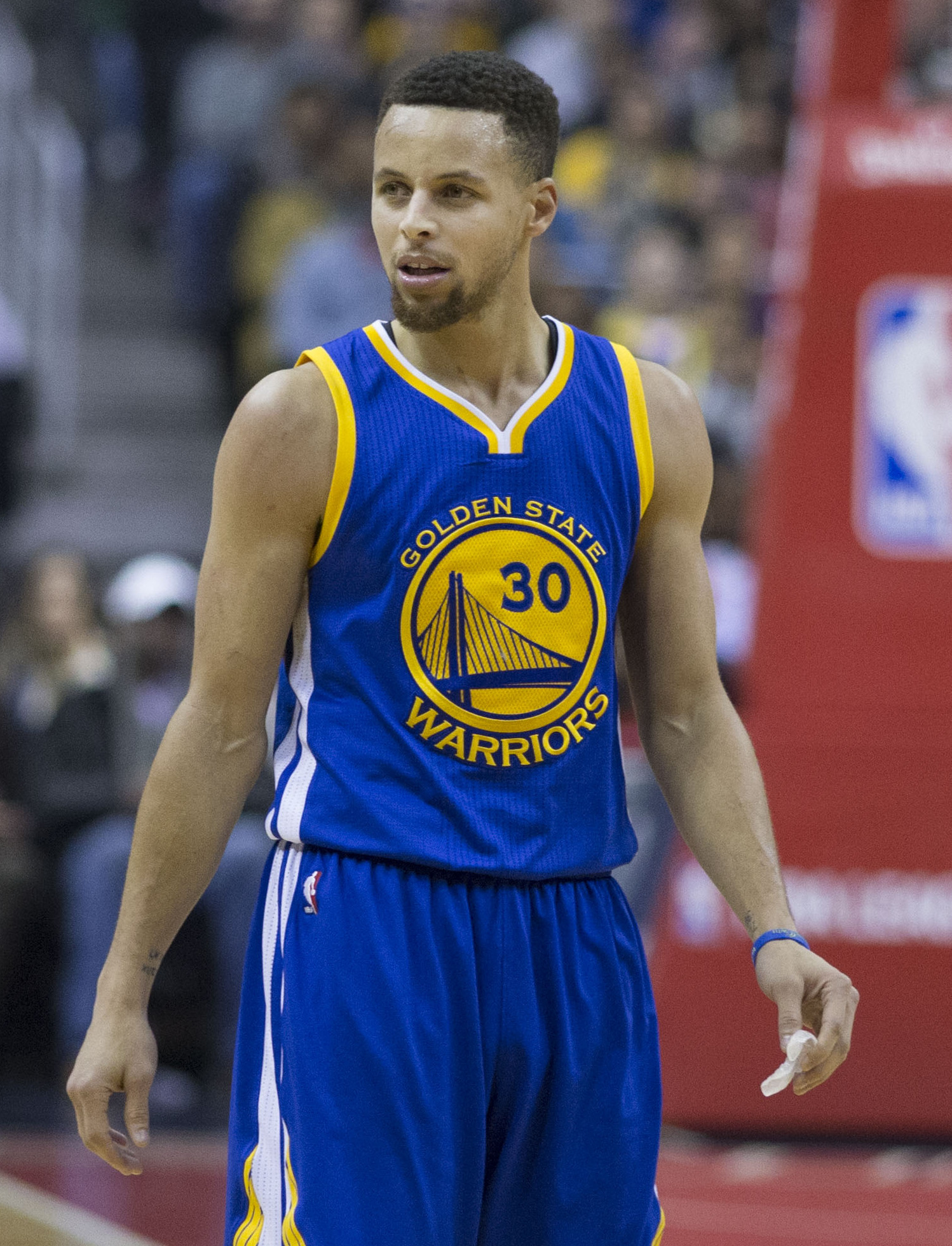
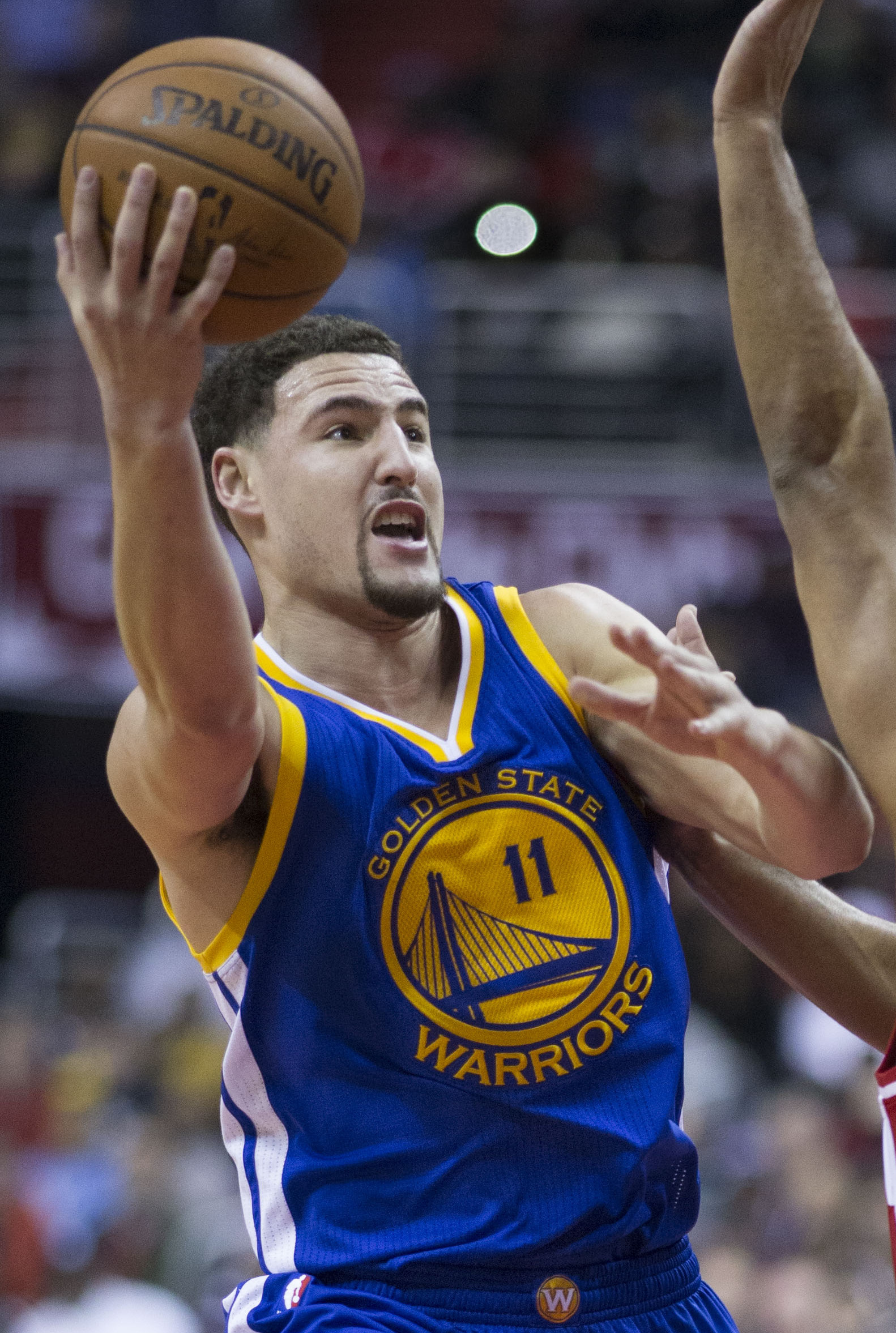
Stephen Curry (left) and Klay Thompson (right)

The Splash Brothers are a former duo of American professional basketball players, guards Stephen Curry and Klay Thompson, who played together for the Golden State Warriors in the National Basketball Association (NBA) from 2011 to 2024. Considered among the greatest shooters in NBA history, and one of the greatest backcourts of all time, they combined to set various NBA records for three-point field goals by a pair of teammates, and each won the Three-Point Contest. They were NBA All-Stars and together won four NBA championships and appeared in six NBA Finals with the Warriors.

The sons of former NBA players, neither Curry nor Thompson were highly recruited out of high school, but enjoyed relatively successful college basketball careers before being selected in the first round of the NBA draft by the Warriors. Curry was chosen with the seventh overall pick in 2009, while Thompson was the eleventh overall selection in 2011. In 2014–15, they became the first teammates in the league to be the starting guards in the same All-Star Game since 1975, and they were the Warriors' first pair of All-Stars since 1993. They also became the first guard combo to be named to the All-NBA Team in the same season since 1979–80. The two also enjoyed team success, helping the Warriors win the 2015 NBA Finals for the team's first title in 40 years. They would later replicate the feat in 2017, 2018, and 2022 for four championships. Additionally, they were teammates on the United States national team in 2014, winning the gold medal at the FIBA Basketball World Cup. After 13 years with Golden State, Thompson left to join the Dallas Mavericks in a six-team sign-and-trade deal on July 6, 2024.

== Background ==
Stephen Curry and Klay Thompson both share similar backgrounds and circumstances as to how they began playing basketball. For instance, both were born into athletic families. Their fathers, Dell Curry and Mychal Thompson, each had productive NBA careers, while mothers Sonya Curry and Julie Thompson were both volleyball players in college. Their brothers, Seth Curry and Mychel Thompson, also became basketball players. However, neither Stephen nor Klay were highly recruited by college basketball programs.

Curry did not receive athletic scholarship offers from any major universities, and his parents' alma mater, Virginia Tech, asked him to be a walk-on. He landed at a mid-major basketball program in Davidson College, a small private school in North Carolina. As a sophomore, Curry's scoring and three-point shooting developed a national following as he led the Wildcats within a game of the Final Four in the 2008 NCAA Tournament. The following season, he was a consensus first-team All-American and led the nation in scoring with an average of 28.6 points per game.

Thompson played at Washington State University, which was not considered a basketball powerhouse. Recruited there by coach Tony Bennett, he was only lightly recruited by the other Pacific-10 (now Pac-12) schools, prompting him to move from California to Washington. Thompson became a two-time, first-team All-Pac-10 player, and led the conference in scoring with 21.6 points per game in 2010–11. He finished his Cougars career holding the school record for most career three-pointers (242).

== Golden State Warriors ==
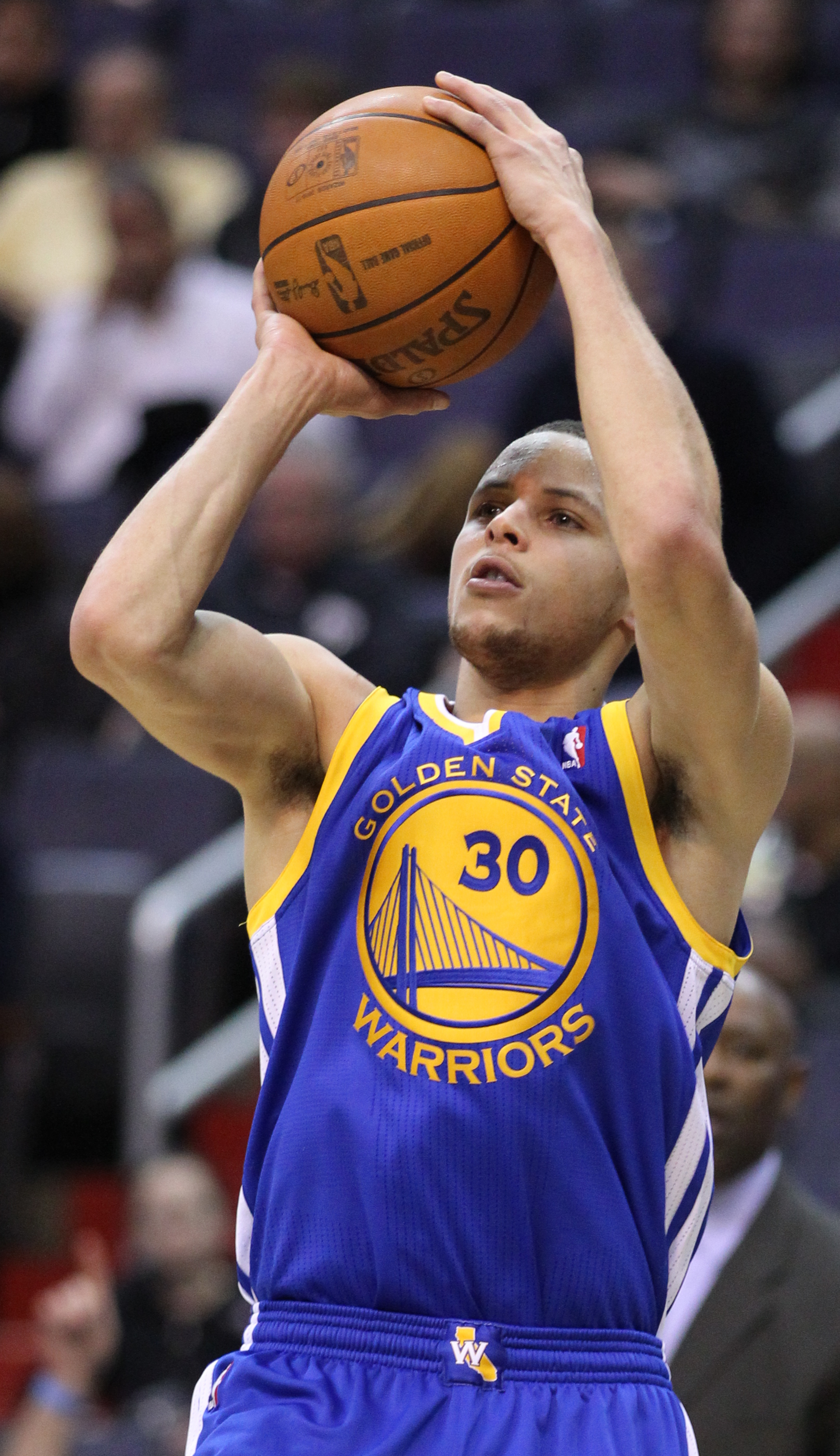
Curry holds the NBA record for most three-pointers in a season.

Golden State selected the 6-foot-2-inch (1.88 m) Curry in the first round of the 2009 NBA draft with the seventh overall pick. Although the Warriors already had another lean, 6-foot-3, offensive-minded guard in Monta Ellis, coach Don Nelson had a penchant for using small lineups in his Nellie Ball system, and had warmed to the idea of selecting Curry. However, Ellis announced at a media session that he and Curry were too small to play together. Two years later, while Curry and Ellis were still adjusting to each other, the Warriors added another scoring guard in the 6-foot-6-inch (1.98 m) Thompson, whom they drafted in the first round with the 11th overall pick in 2011. Curry and Thompson had limited time together in their first year as teammates; the 2011–12 season was shortened to 66 games because of the NBA lockout, and Curry missed 40 games due to injuries. Towards the end of the season, Golden State traded the fan-favorite Ellis in a deal for center Andrew Bogut, leaving Curry to lead the team and opening the shooting guard position to Thompson, who provided needed size to their backcourt.

In 2012–13, Curry and Thompson combined to make 483 three-pointers, the most ever by an NBA duo. (Note: Previous record was 435 by the Orlando Magic's Dennis Scott and Nick Anderson in 1995–96, when the NBA briefly had a shorter three-point line with a uniform distance of 22 feet (6.7 m)) Curry set an NBA record with 272 three-pointers, while Thompson added 211, at the time the 22nd best season in league history. Warriors coach Mark Jackson opined that the tandem was "the greatest shooting backcourt of all time". Golden State advanced to the second round of the NBA playoffs before losing to the eventual Western Conference champion San Antonio Spurs. Curry and Thompson in 2013–14 became the first teammates to finish first and second in three-pointers, making 261 and 223, respectively. They also extended their combined three-pointer record by one (484), and together averaged 42.4 points per game. With Curry making 42.4 percent of his three-point attempts and Thompson converting 41.7 percent, ESPN.com wrote that "no backcourt in history has rivaled the Splash Brothers in both categories of 3-point volume and efficiency." During the offseason, they were both members of the 2014 U.S. national team that won the gold at FIBA World Cup. The two combined to make more three-pointers than any other duo in the tournament, accounting for 43 of Team USA's 77 threes in 13 games. Thompson established himself as a star in the international competition, and emerged more as Curry's peer rather than his sidekick. He was the second-leading scorer for Team USA, averaging 12.7 points, while Curry added 10.7. (Note: James Harden averaged 14.2 to lead the U.S. in scoring.)

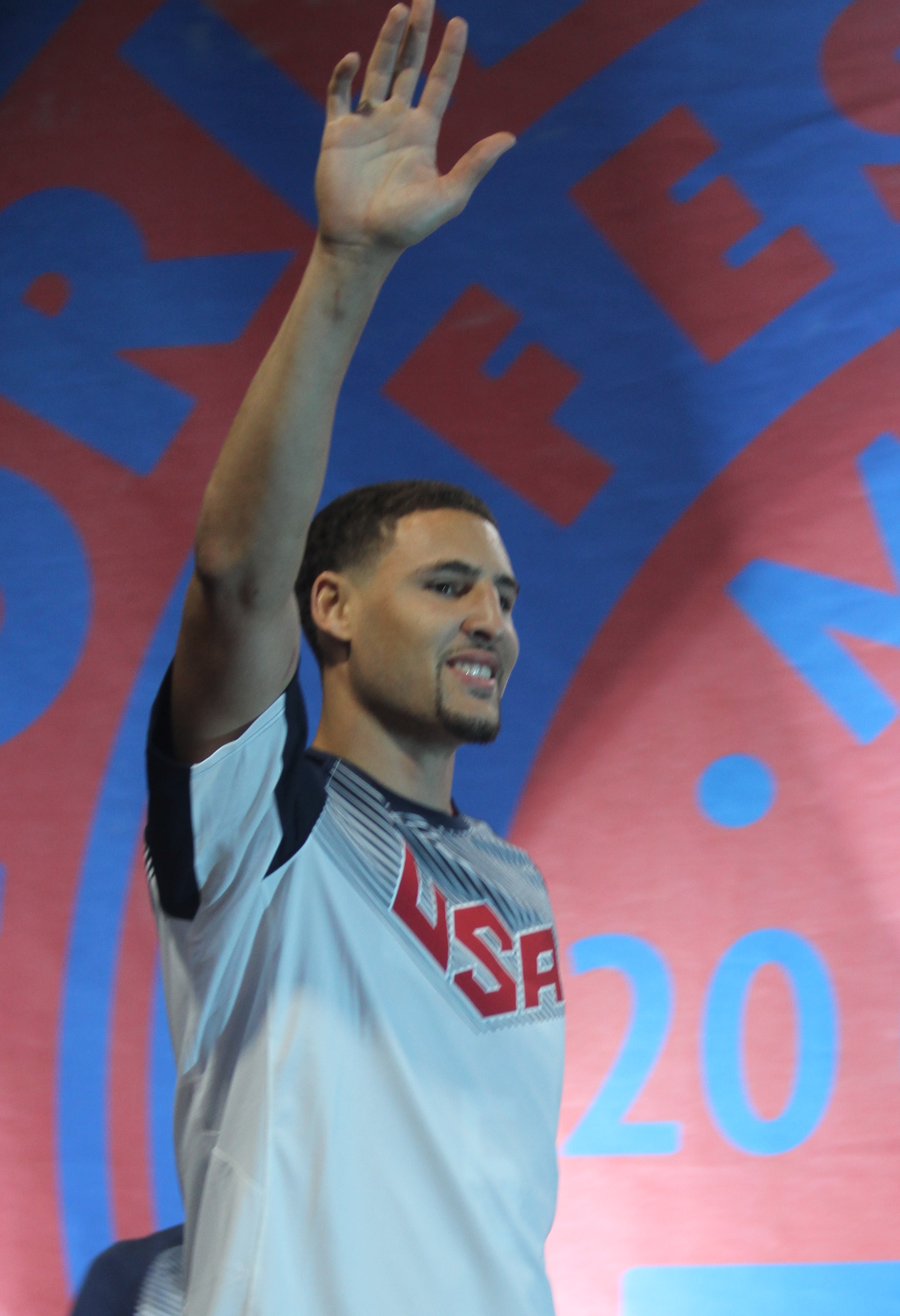
Thompson emerged as a star in the 2014 World Cup.

Prior to the 2014–15 season, the Warriors considered breaking up the pair and trading Thompson for forward Kevin Love, but instead kept their starting backcourt intact by signing Thompson to a four-year, $70 million contract extension. That season, Curry and Thompson each scored 50 points in a game, just the seventh time it had occurred on the same team in an NBA season, and the first time since 1994–95. (Note: Jamal Mashburn and Jim Jackson of the Dallas Mavericks each scored 50 in 1994–95.) They both started in the 2015 NBA All-Star Game, becoming the first teammates to be the starting guards in an All-Star Game since 1975. (Note: Walt Frazier and Earl Monroe of the New York Knicks started for the Eastern Conference in 1975.) Curry received the most All-Star fan votes of any player for his second straight All-Star start. Coming off NBA single-quarter records of 37 points and nine three-pointers during a 52-point game in January, Thompson was making his All-Star debut. He was voted onto the team as a reserve by Western Conference coaches before being named as a replacement starter by West coach Steve Kerr, who had become the Warriors coach that season. The Splash Brothers were the Warriors' first All-Star duo since Tim Hardaway and Chris Mullin in 1993, and the franchise's first pair of starters in the All-Star game since Rick Barry and Nate Thurmond in 1967. During All-Star Weekend, Curry and Thompson also competed in the Three-Point Contest, which was widely considered to have the greatest field of contestants in the event's history. They both advanced to the three-man final round before Curry won the contest.

The Warriors finished Kerr's first season with a league-best 67–15 record, the most wins ever by an NBA rookie coach, and won the 2015 NBA Finals for their first title in 40 years. Curry captured the NBA Most Valuable Player Award. Kerr had Curry guard opposing point guards, which Curry credited with keeping him more focused; Jackson had previously assigned that defensive responsibility to the taller Thompson. Additionally, Curry broke his own record for three-pointers (286), and Thompson again finished second in the league (239) as the two combined to make 525 threes, surpassing their previous record by 41 while converting 44 percent of their shots. They were both named to the All-NBA Team, with Curry being named to the first team, and Thompson earning third-team honors. It was the first time Warriors teammates were named All-NBA in the same season since Mullin (first team) and Hardaway (second) were recognized in 1991–92. Curry and Thompson were the first backcourt mates to be selected All-NBA since 1979–80, when Gus Williams and Dennis Johnson of Seattle were both named to the second team.

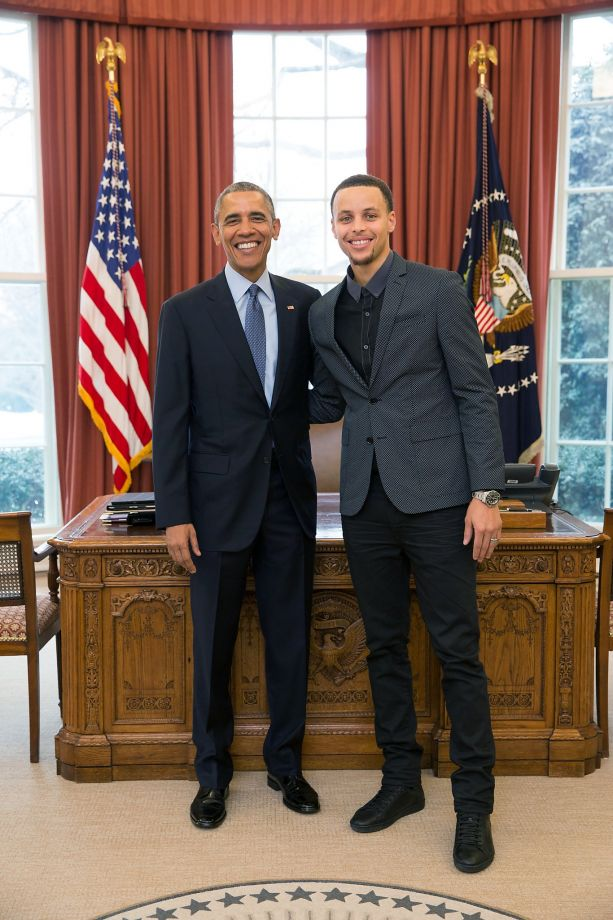
Former President Barack Obama opined that he preferred Thompson's jump shot over Curry's.

In honor of their 2015 championship, Golden State visited the White House in February 2016, and President Barack Obama opined that Thompson's jump shot was "actually a little prettier" than Curry's. The Warriors entered the All-Star break in 2015–16 with a 48–4 record, the best start in NBA history. Curry was voted into the All-Star Game as a starter, and Thompson was selected as a reserve along with teammate Draymond Green. Curry was averaging a league-leading 29.8 points per game, and both he and Thompson were again 1–2 in the league in three-pointers made. They were again selected to compete in the Three-Point Contest, and Curry was a heavy favorite to win; the betting site, Bovada, listed Curry as the favorite to win with 10–11 odds, while Thompson was second at 9–2. Once more, the two advanced to the final round, but Thompson prevailed while Curry was the runner-up, outscoring him 27–23.

With 24 games remaining in the season, Curry again surpassed his NBA record for three-pointers, reaching 288 against the Oklahoma City Thunder in a 121–118 win. He also tied an NBA record with 12 three-pointers in the game, (Note: He joined Kobe Bryant and Donyell Marshall.) including the game-winner from beyond 30 feet (9.1 m) in the last second in overtime. Curry and Thompson broke their combined record for three-pointers in a season after just 66 games, when the Warriors (60–6) became the fastest team in league history to ever reach 60 wins in a season. Golden State finished the season with an NBA-record 73 wins. Curry finished the season with 402 three-point shots made, and Thompson was second with 276. Their combined total of 678 shattered their previous record by 153. They were also the highest-scoring duo in the NBA with an average of 52.2 points per game. In the playoffs, the Warriors rallied from a 3–1 deficit in the Western Conference Finals to defeat Oklahoma City, 4–3. Thompson scored 41 points and made an NBA playoff record 11 three-pointers in Game 6, and the Splash Brothers were the first NBA players to finish with at least 30 three-pointers in a playoff series. Their 62 combined makes exceeded the Thunders' series total of 55.

In 2016–17, Curry and Thompson became the first two players in NBA history to make at least 200 three-pointers in five consecutive seasons. Curry broke the NBA record for most three-pointers made in a single game with 13, breaking the previous of 12 he held jointly with Kobe Bryant and Donyell Marshall. In 2017–18, the duo each made 200 three-pointers again to extend their record for consecutive seasons with 200 made. In Game 6 of the Western Conference Finals against Houston, Thompson scored 35 points and shot 9-of-14 on three-pointers and Curry added 29 points and five 3's to help the Warriors overcome a 17-point deficit and win 115–86, staving off elimination and tying the series at 3–3. The Splash Brothers outscored the Rockets 37–25 in the second half while shooting 11-of-15 on three-pointers.

All-Star center DeMarcus Cousins joined the Warriors in 2018–19. While teammates with Curry and Thompson on the 2014 US FIBA Basketball World Cup team, he had joked that he was the third Splash Brother. At the time, he had made nine of his 61 three-point attempts (14.8%) in his four-year career, but had improved to 35.1 percent in the four years since. On October 29, 2018, against the Chicago Bulls, Thompson hit an NBA-record 14 threes to break Curry's former mark of 13. Thompson scored 52 points in 27 minutes while making 14-for-24 of his threes. His 10 three-pointers in the first half tied Chandler Parsons' record set in 2014, and Golden State made 17 threes in the first half to set the NBA record for a half. With Curry having already scored 51 points in a game earlier in 2018–19, the Splash Brothers became the first NBA teammates to have each scored 50 or more points in a contest through their team's first eight games. In the 2019 playoffs, the Warriors eliminated the Los Angeles Clippers in the first round 4–2, but both Curry and Thompson suffered sprained ankles in Game 6, and they were questionable entering Game 1 of the conference semifinals against Houston. The series was tied 2–2 after four games, and the Splash Brothers were struggling with their 3-point shooting, combining to miss at least two-thirds of their attempts in five straight games, (Note: Dating back to Game 6 against the Clippers) the longest streak in their postseason history. With the two struggling with their shooting, Kevin Durant had been the Warriors best player in the playoffs, averaging a team-leading 35.4 points entering Game 5. However, Durant left the game with 2:05 remaining in the third quarter after suffering a strained right calf; he was later ruled out indefinitely. Curry led the Golden State to a Game 5 win after scoring 16 of his 25 points after Durant exited, while Thompson had seven of his 27 during that stretch. The Warriors captured the series on the road in Game 6, when Thompson scored 21 of his 27 in the first half, and Curry collected all of his 33 points in the second half. Golden State lost 4–2 in the 2019 finals against the Toronto Raptors. Already without Durant, who returned and tore his Achilles in Game 5, the Warriors lost Thompson near the end of the third quarter of the deciding Game 6 after he tore the anterior cruciate ligament in his left knee.

After these injuries, Golden State finished with a league-worst 15–50 record in 2019–20. Thompson missed the entire season rehabilitating his injury, and Curry was limited to five games all season after breaking his left hand in October. The Warriors' season ended prematurely due to the COVID-19 pandemic. In November 2020, Thompson tore his right Achilles tendon while playing a pickup game and was ruled out for the 2020–21 season. Curry won his second Three-Point Contest in 2021 and dedicated the win to the recovering Thompson.

During the 2021–22 season, Thompson returned to play in 32 regular season games, and Curry became the NBA career leader in 3-pointers. Fellow guard Jordan Poole emerged as a starter for the team and his success in three-point shooting led some media writers to call him the "Third Splash Brother". His three-point shooting attracted much attention, with teammates comparing Poole to Curry; Thompson called Poole a "baby Steph Curry", while Green stated Poole was doing "his best impression" of Curry. Golden State advanced to the 2022 finals, returning to the series after their fifth-straight appearance in 2019. They defeated the Boston Celtics in six games, with Curry winning Finals MVP unanimously.

== Nickname ==
The Splash Brothers nickname refers to the duo's ability to "splash" the net with the ball, particularly on three-point shots, and is a play on an older nickname for another pair of San Francisco Bay Area teammates, baseball players Jose Canseco and Mark McGwire, who were known as the Bash Brothers when they played for the Oakland Athletics. The term began in 2012 in a tweet from Brian Witt, a writer for the Warriors website. On December 21 against the Charlotte Bobcats, Curry and Thompson had combined for 25 points and seven 3-pointers by halftime, when Witt posted an update of their performance on the team's Twitter account with a #SplashBrothers hashtag; Golden State would win the game 115–100. The Warriors liked the nickname, and encouraged Witt to continue tweeting it.

== Records ==
- Most career three-pointers made in history by a duo (6,228).
- Most career three-pointers made in NBA playoffs history by a duo (1,119).
- Most career three-pointers made in NBA Finals history by a duo (258).
- Most three-pointers made in a season by a duo with 678.
  - Broke their own record of 525.
- Most three-pointers attempted in a season by a duo with 1,568.
- Most three-pointers made in a playoff season by a duo with 178.
- Shared record for most three-pointers made in a playoff season with 98.
- Shared record for most consecutive playoff games with at least 6 three-pointers made with 3.
- Shared record for most consecutive seasons with at least 200 three-pointers made with 7.
- Shared record for most 40-point games with at most 1 free throw attempted with 3.
- Only duo in NBA history to make at least 12 three-pointers in multiple games.
- Only duo in NBA history to record multiple 50-point games with at most 3 free throws attempted.
- Only duo in NBA history to make at least 250 three-pointers in a season.
  - Have achieved this in four seasons.
- Only duo in NBA history to make at least 300 three-pointers in a season.
- Only duo in NBA history to make at least 500 combined three-pointers in a season.
  - Have achieved this in six seasons.
- Only duo in NBA history to make at least 600 combined three-pointers in a season.
  - Have achieved this in two seasons.
- Only duo in NBA history to make at least 400 combined three-pointers in consecutive seasons.
  - Have achieved this in seven consecutive seasons.
- Only duo in NBA history to make at least 500 combined three-pointers in consecutive seasons.
  - Have achieved this in three consecutive seasons.
- Only duo in NBA history to make at least 150 combined three-pointers in a playoff season.
  - Have achieved this in four seasons.
- Only duo in NBA history to make at least 150 combined three-pointers in consecutive playoff seasons.
- Only duo in NBA history to make at least 6 three-pointers in consecutive NBA Finals games.

== See also ==
- Death Lineup
- Run TMC
