= Wardell Stephen Curry =

Wardell Stephen Curry may refer to:

- Wardell Stephen Curry I or Dell Curry (born 1964), American basketball player
- Wardell Stephen Curry II or Stephen Curry (born 1988), American basketball player
