= Justus Watson Folsom =

American entomologist (1871-1936)

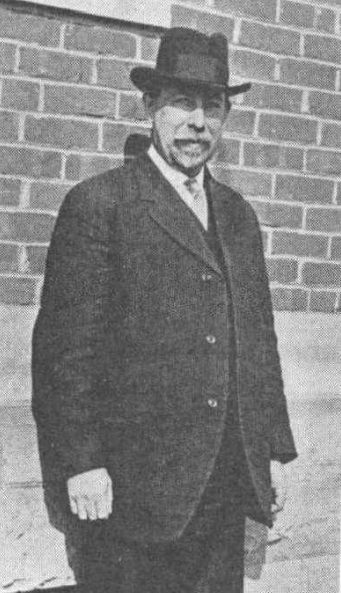

Justus Watson Folsom (2 September 1871 – 24 September 1936) was an American entomologist. As part of his work at the US Bureau of Entomology, he mainly studied insects that had an economic impact on the cotton industry, but also specialized in the systematics of the Collembola and Thysanura.

Folsom was born in Cambridge, Massachusetts. He completed a BS from Harvard University in 1895 and received a doctorate in 1899. His early work was on the segmentation of the insect head. He taught natural science at Antioch College in 1899 and went to the University of Illinois the next year as an entomology instructor. He published a textbook "Entomology with special reference to its biological and economic aspects" the first edition of which was published in 1906 which went into a fourth edition in 1934 in collaboration with R. A. Wardle. He became an assistant professor in 1906 and associate professor in 1908 and worked in Illinois for 23 years. In 1925, he joined the US Bureau of Entomology in Louisiana and worked especially on the insects of cotton. He died in Vicksburg, Mississippi, a few weeks after a heart attack.
