= Wardell Curry =

Wardell Curry may refer to:

- Wardell Curry I or Dell Curry (born 1964), American retired basketball player
- Wardell Curry II or Stephen Curry (born 1988), American basketball player, son of Dell Curry
