= Anthony Morrow =

American basketball player (born 1985)

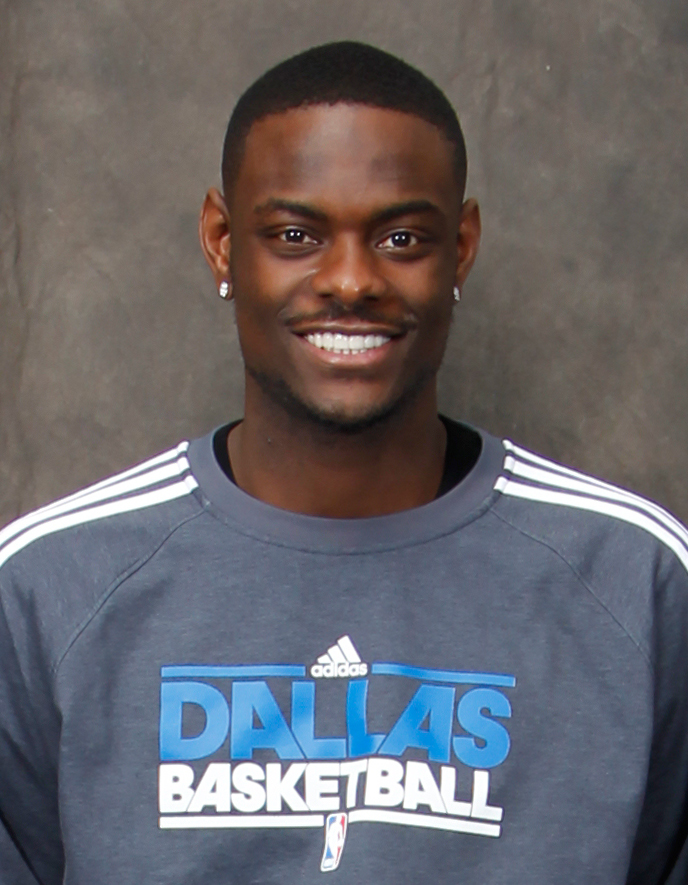
- Morrow in 2013

Personal information
- Born: September 27, 1985 (age 41) Charlotte, North Carolina, U.S.
- Listed height: 6 ft 5 in (1.96 m)
- Listed weight: 210 lb (95 kg)

Career information
- High school: Charlotte Latin School (Charlotte, North Carolina)
- College: Georgia Tech (2004–2008)
- NBA draft: 2008: undrafted
- Playing career: 2008–2017
- Position: Shooting guard
- Number: 22, 23, 3, 2, 11

Career history
- 2008–2010: Golden State Warriors
- 2010–2012: New Jersey Nets
- 2012–2013: Atlanta Hawks
- 2013: Dallas Mavericks
- 2013–2014: New Orleans Pelicans
- 2014–2017: Oklahoma City Thunder
- 2017: Chicago Bulls

Career highlights
- North Carolina Mr. Basketball (2004)
- Stats at NBA.com
- Stats at Basketball Reference

Anthony Jarrad Morrow (born September 27, 1985) is an American former professional basketball player and executive who was most recently an executive for the Oklahoma City Thunder of the National Basketball Association (NBA). He played college basketball for Georgia Tech. He went undrafted in the 2008 NBA draft but was later signed by the Golden State Warriors. He was best known for his three-point shooting.

== College career ==
Morrow played four years of college basketball for Georgia Tech, where in 123 games, he made 70 starts and averaged 11.4 points, 3.3 rebounds and 1.0 assists per game.

== Professional career ==
=== Golden State Warriors (2008–2010) ===
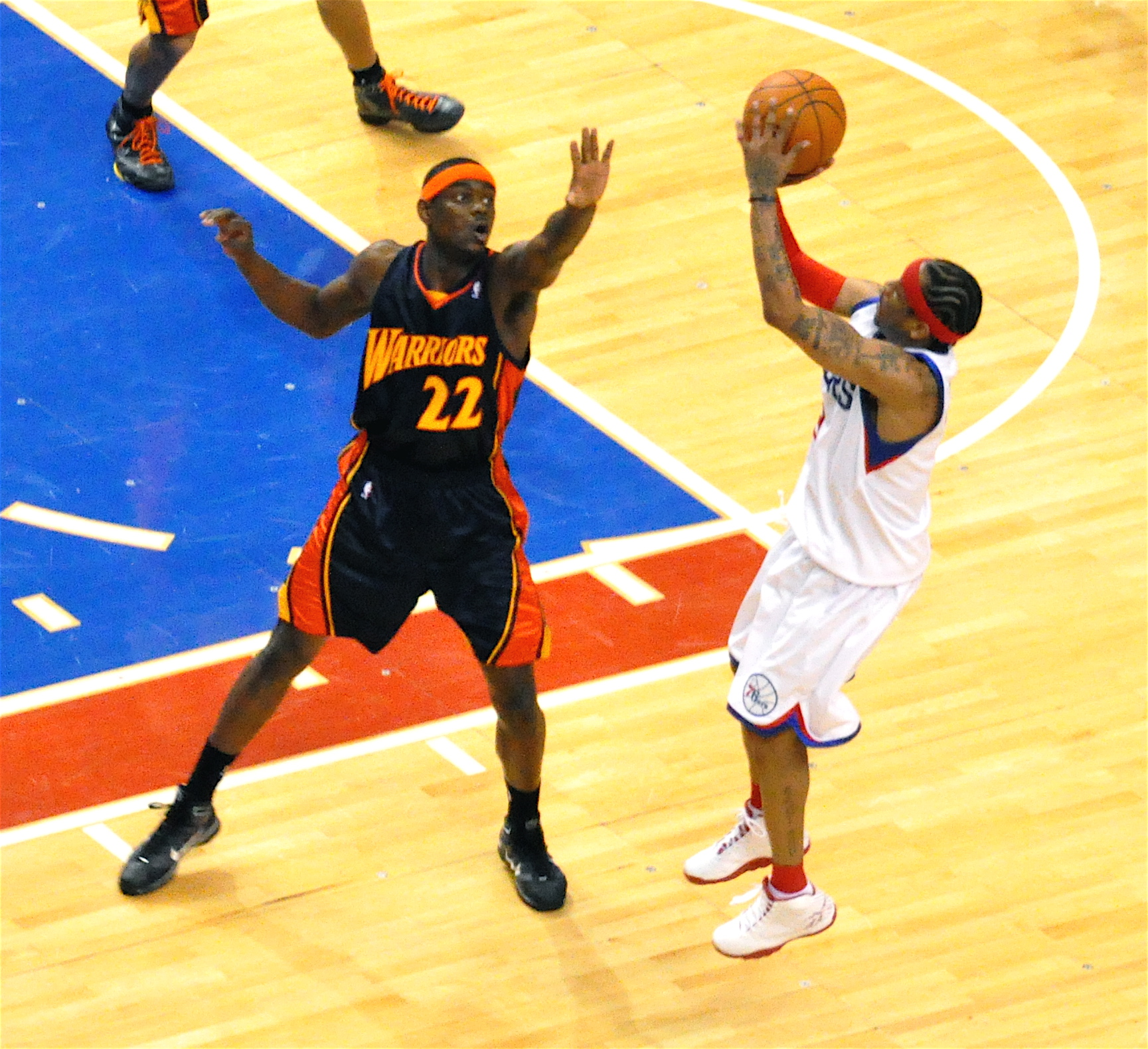
Morrow contests an Allen Iverson shot in 2010

After going undrafted in the 2008 NBA draft, Morrow joined the Golden State Warriors for the 2008 NBA Summer League. On July 24, 2008, he signed with the Warriors.

In his first NBA start, he scored 37 points on 15-for-20 shooting against the Los Angeles Clippers—the most points ever scored in a game by an undrafted player in his rookie season—and grabbed 11 rebounds. Morrow finished the 2008–09 season as the first rookie and first Warrior ever to lead the league in three-point field goal shooting, going 86-for-184 for a .467 percentage.

Morrow re-joined the Warriors for the 2009 NBA Summer League, where he scored 47 points for the Warriors in a game against the New Orleans Hornets – setting the record for the most points scored by an individual in a game at the NBA Summer League.

In the 13th game of the 2009–10 NBA season, Morrow set a new career high with 6 three-pointers in a victory over the Dallas Mavericks.

=== New Jersey Nets (2010–2012) ===
On July 13, 2010, Morrow signed a 3-year, $12 million contract with the New Jersey Nets, with Golden State matching the offer, but he was subsequently traded to the Nets for a future second-round draft pick in a sign-and-trade deal.

At the end of the 2010–11 NBA season, Morrow had the second highest 3-point percentage in history (behind Steve Kerr).

On February 3, 2012, Morrow scored a career-high 42 points in a loss to the Minnesota Timberwolves.

=== Atlanta Hawks (2012–2013) ===
On July 11, 2012, the Nets traded Morrow, Johan Petro, Jordan Farmar, Jordan Williams, and DeShawn Stevenson to the Atlanta Hawks for Joe Johnson.

=== Dallas Mavericks (2013) ===
On February 21, 2013, the Atlanta Hawks traded Morrow to the Dallas Mavericks for Dahntay Jones.

=== New Orleans Pelicans (2013–2014) ===
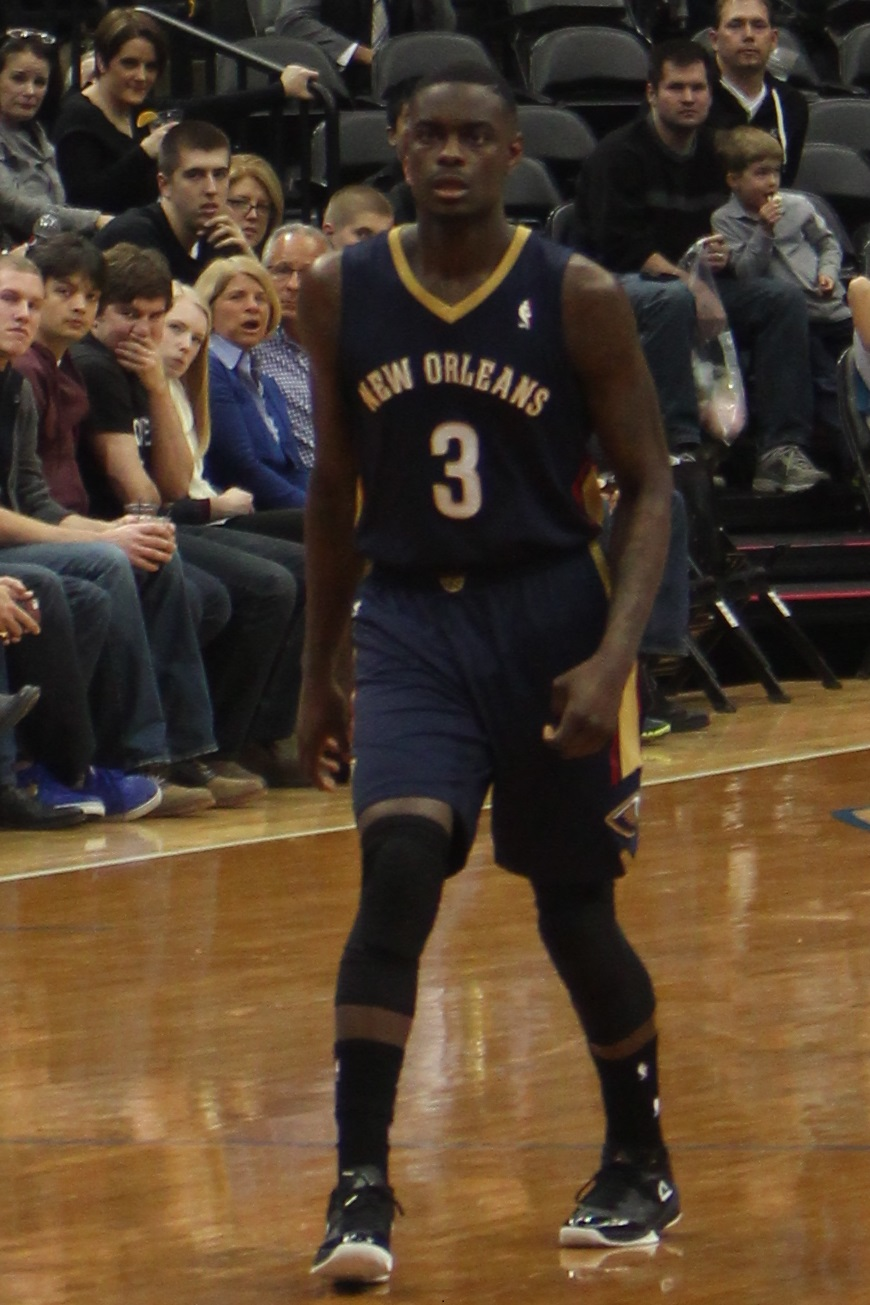
Morrow with the Pelicans in 2014

On July 18, 2013, Morrow signed a one-year contract with the New Orleans Pelicans.

=== Oklahoma City Thunder (2014–2017) ===
On July 16, 2014, Morrow signed a three-year, $10 million contract with the Oklahoma City Thunder. On April 1, 2015, he scored a season-high 32 points on 11-of-16 shooting in a loss to the Dallas Mavericks.

On January 4, 2016, Morrow scored a season-high 20 points in a loss to the Sacramento Kings.

=== Chicago Bulls (2017) ===
On February 23, 2017, Morrow was traded, along with Joffrey Lauvergne and Cameron Payne, to the Chicago Bulls in exchange for Taj Gibson, Doug McDermott and a 2018 second-round draft pick.

On September 18, 2017, Morrow signed with the Portland Trail Blazers. He was waived on October 13 after appearing in five preseason games.

== NBA career statistics ==
Legend
GP	Games played	GS	Games started	MPG	Minutes per game
FG%	Field goal percentage	3P%	3-point field goal percentage	FT%	Free throw percentage
RPG	Rebounds per game	APG	Assists per game	SPG	Steals per game
BPG	Blocks per game	PPG	Points per game	**Bold**	Career high
*	Led the league

=== Regular season ===
Year	Team	GP	GS	MPG	FG%	3P%	FT%	RPG	APG	SPG	BPG	PPG
2008–09	Golden State	67	17	22.6	**.478**	**.467***	.870	3.0	1.2	.5	**.2**	10.1
2009–10	Golden State	69	37	29.2	.468	.456	.886	**3.8**	**1.5**	**.9**	**.2**	13.0
2010–11	New Jersey	58	**47**	**32.0**	.450	.423	.897	3.0	1.2	.3	.1	**13.2**
2011–12	New Jersey	62	18	26.4	.413	.371	.933	2.0	1.0	.7	.1	12.0
2012–13	Atlanta	24	1	12.5	.423	.395	.889	1.1	.4	.5	.0	5.2
2012–13	Dallas	17	0	4.8	.500	.200	**1.000**	.2	.2	.1	.0	2.3
2013–14	New Orleans	**76**	9	18.8	.458	.451	.828	1.8	.8	.5	**.2**	8.4
2014–15	Oklahoma City	74	0	24.4	.463	.431	.888	2.6	.8	.7	.1	10.7
2015–16	Oklahoma City	68	6	13.6	.408	.387	.744	.9	.4	.3	.1	5.6
2016–17	Oklahoma City	40	7	15.7	.387	.294	.885	.7	.5	.5	.1	5.8
2016–17	Chicago	9	0	9.7	.414	.429	**1.000**	.2	.7	.2	.0	4.6
Career		564	142	21.8	.447	.417	.880	2.2	.9	.6	.1	9.4

=== Playoffs ===
Year	Team	GP	GS	MPG	FG%	3P%	FT%	RPG	APG	SPG	BPG	PPG
2016	Oklahoma City	**14**	0	5.4	.458	**.357**	**1.000**	.1	.1	**.1**	.0	2.6
2017	Chicago	3	0	**9.7**	**.556**	—	**1.000**	**1.0**	**.7**	.0	.0	**4.0**
Career		17	0	6.2	.485	.357	1.000	.3	.2	.1	.0	2.9

== Legal issues ==
In February 2023, Morrow was arrested for multiple assault-related charges including kidnapping and strangulation for the alleged assault of his girlfriend.

== See also ==
- List of National Basketball Association career 3-point field goal percentage leaders
