= Seth Curry =

American basketball player (born 1990)

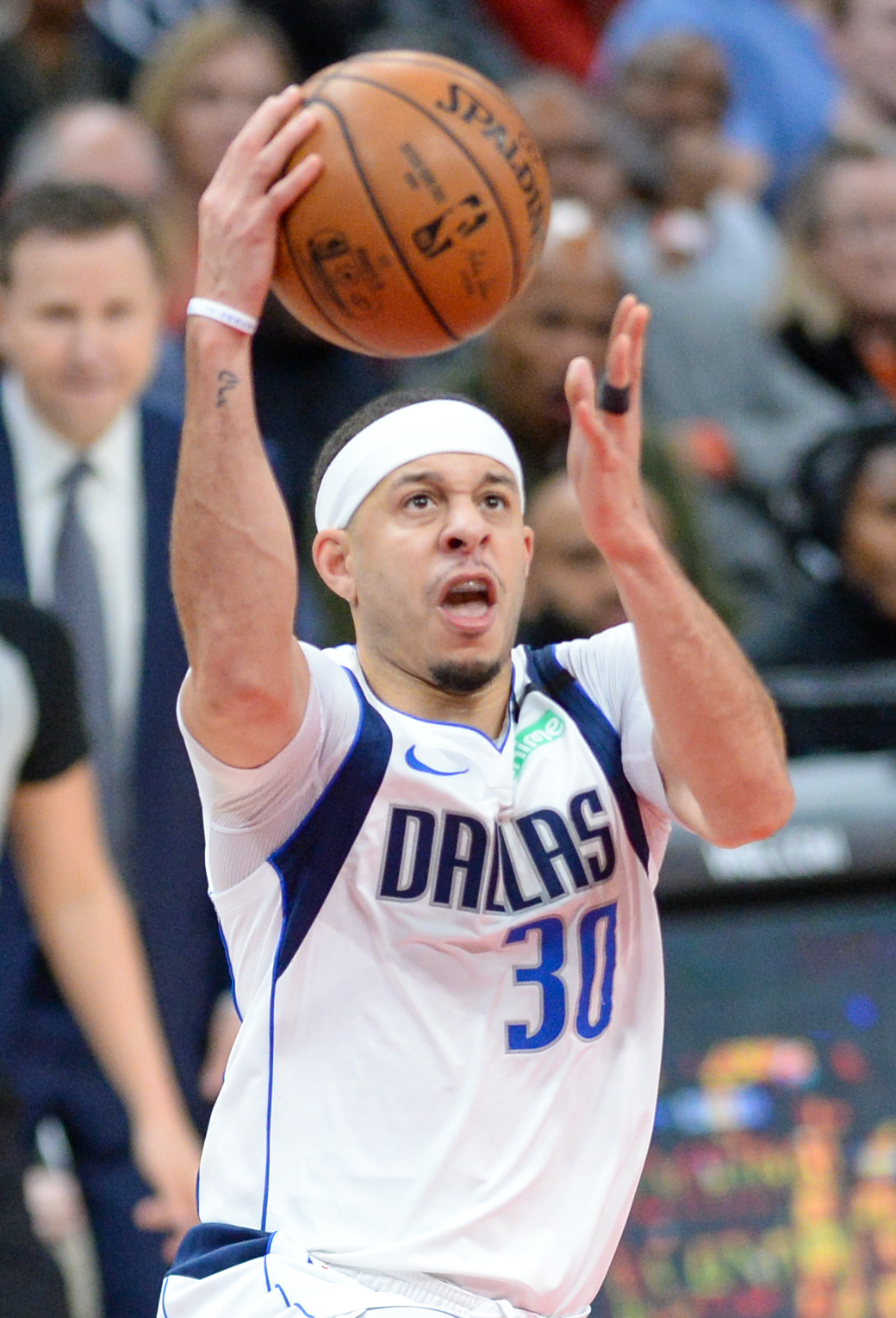
- Curry with the Dallas Mavericks in 2020

Free agent
- Position: Shooting guard / point guard

Personal information
- Born: August 23, 1990 (age 36) Charlotte, North Carolina, U.S.
- Listed height: 6 ft 1 in (1.85 m)
- Listed weight: 185 lb (84 kg)

Career information
- High school: Charlotte Christian (Charlotte, North Carolina)
- College: Liberty (2008–2009); Duke (2010–2013)
- NBA draft: 2013: undrafted
- Playing career: 2013–present

Career history
- 2013–2014: Santa Cruz Warriors
- 2013–2014: Memphis Grizzlies
- 2014: Cleveland Cavaliers
- 2014–2015: Erie BayHawks
- 2015: Phoenix Suns
- 2015–2016: Sacramento Kings
- 2016–2018: Dallas Mavericks
- 2018–2019: Portland Trail Blazers
- 2019–2020: Dallas Mavericks
- 2020–2022: Philadelphia 76ers
- 2022–2023: Brooklyn Nets
- 2023–2024: Dallas Mavericks
- 2024–2025: Charlotte Hornets
- 2025–2026: Golden State Warriors

Career highlights
- 2× NBA D-League All-Star (2014, 2015); All-NBA D-League First Team (2015); All-NBA D-League Third Team (2014); NBA D-League All-Rookie First Team (2014); Second-team All-American – SN (2013); First-team All-ACC (2013); Third-team All-ACC (2012)
- Stats at NBA.com
- Stats at Basketball Reference
Medals
Men's basketball
Representing the United States
U-19 World Championship
Gold medal – first place	2009 New Zealand	Team

Seth Adham Curry (born August 23, 1990) is an American professional basketball player who last played for the Golden State Warriors of the National Basketball Association (NBA). He played college basketball for one year at Liberty University before transferring to Duke. He is the son of former NBA player Dell Curry and the younger brother of NBA player Stephen Curry. He currently ranks seventh in NBA history in career three-point field goal percentage.

== Early life ==
Curry is the son of former National Basketball Association (NBA) player Dell Curry and former Virginia Tech women's volleyball player Sonya Curry. He grew up in Charlotte, North Carolina, while his father, Dell, played for the Charlotte Hornets. As a child, Curry's father would take him and his older brother, Stephen, to his games where they would often shoot around with the team in warm-ups. Curry is a 2008 graduate of Charlotte Christian School where he was a three-year starter for the Knights' basketball team. His senior year, Curry averaged 22.3 points, 5.0 rebounds, and 5.0 assists while shooting 52 percent from the field. At the end of the season, he earned all-conference, all-state, and first team SAA All-American accolades. In his three years on varsity, Charlotte Christian amassed a 105–24 overall record including a state final appearance in 2006. Curry was also on the Charlotte Christian academic honor roll all four years.

College recruiting
Name	Hometown	School	Height	Weight	Commit date
Seth Curry; PG	Charlotte, NC	Charlotte Christian School	6 ft 3 in (1.91 m)	220 lb (100 kg)	Sep 20, 2007
Seth Curry; PG	Recruit ratings: Scout: Rivals: (87)				
Overall recruit ranking: Rivals: 35 (PG)
Note: In many cases, Scout, Rivals, 247Sports, On3, and ESPN may conflict in their listings of height and weight.; In these cases, the average was taken. ESPN grades are on a 100-point scale.; Sources: "2008 Liberty Basketball Commitment List". Rivals.; "2008 Liberty College Basketball Recruiting Commits". Scout.; "Liberty Flames 2008 Player Commits". ESPN.; "Scout.com Team Recruiting Rankings". Scout.; "2008 Team Ranking". Rivals.

== College career ==
=== Liberty ===
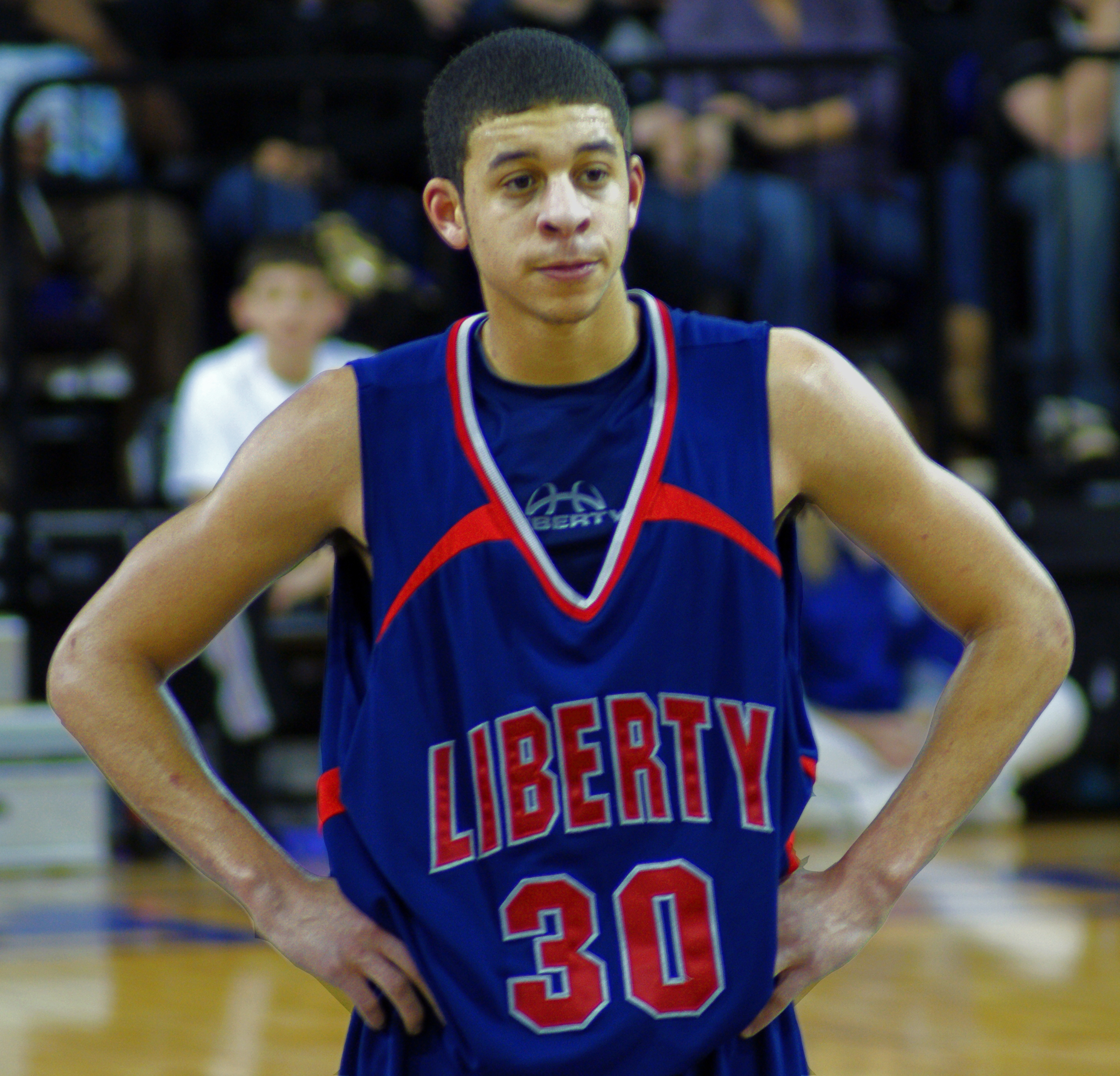
Curry with Liberty in 2009 playing at the Millis Center against High Point

After high school, Curry chose to attend Liberty University. In his freshman season at Liberty, he led all freshmen nationally in average points per game scored with 20.2 a game. Curry broke the Big South Conference single-season scoring record for a freshman. He wore the jersey number 30 at Liberty, the same number his father and older brother wore in their careers.

=== Duke ===
Curry transferred from Liberty University to Duke after the 2008–09 season. Per NCAA transfer rules in place at the time, Curry sat out the 2009–10 basketball season. At Duke, he also chose to wear his family number 30.

As a redshirt sophomore, Curry was named a starter after a toe injury sidelined Kyrie Irving. In a game against Miami (OH), Curry led the team with 17 points on 57% shooting. He scored a season high 22 points against North Carolina on February 9, 2011. On December 29, 2012, he scored a career-high 31 against Santa Clara. At the end of his senior year, Curry was named to the All-ACC first team and was named a second team All-American by The Sporting News.

== Professional career ==
=== Santa Cruz Warriors (2013–2014) ===
Curry went undrafted in the 2013 NBA draft. On August 23, 2013, he signed a non-guaranteed contract with the Golden State Warriors. He was, however, later waived by Golden State on October 25, 2013, after appearing in six preseason games.

On November 1, 2013, Curry was acquired by the Santa Cruz Warriors of the NBA Development League as an affiliate player. On November 22, in his D-League debut, Curry recorded 36 points on 12-of-19 shooting, as well as 6 assists and 3 rebounds.

=== Memphis Grizzlies (2013–2014) ===
On December 24, 2013, Curry signed with the Memphis Grizzlies. On January 5, 2014, Curry both made his NBA debut and was waived by the Grizzlies.

=== Return to Santa Cruz (2014) ===
Four days later, Curry was reacquired by the Santa Cruz Warriors. On February 3, 2014, Curry was named to the Futures All-Star roster for the 2014 NBA D-League All-Star Game.

=== Cleveland Cavaliers (2014) ===
On March 21, 2014, Curry signed a 10-day contract with the Cleveland Cavaliers. On the next day, he appeared in his second NBA game, recording three points in nine minutes of action against the Houston Rockets. The Cavaliers decided not to offer Curry a second 10-day contract, and he returned to Santa Cruz the following day. Curry finished the 2013–14 NBA D-League season with averages of 19.7 points, 3.1 rebounds, 5.8 assists and 1.4 steals in 38 games.

During his time at Santa Cruz, Curry played in the back court with Mychel Thompson. At the same time their respective brothers, Stephen Curry and Klay Thompson, were playing together in the Golden State backcourt in a tandem nicknamed the "Splash Brothers."

=== Erie BayHawks (2014–2015) ===
In July 2014, Curry joined the Orlando Magic for the Orlando Summer League and the Phoenix Suns for the Las Vegas Summer League. On September 29, 2014, he signed with the Magic. On October 7, 2014, Curry's D-League rights were acquired by the Magic's affiliated team, the Erie BayHawks, in a trade with the Santa Cruz Warriors. This was done in preparation for Curry returning to the D-League following training camp, as the Magic were now able to send him to their affiliated team instead of Curry returning to Santa Cruz. As anticipated the Magic waived Curry at the conclusion of training camp on October 25, and five days later he was acquired by the Erie BayHawks for the start of D-League training camp. In his debut for Erie in the team's season opener on November 14, Curry scored 23 points on 9-of-24 shooting in a win over the Idaho Stampede. On February 4, 2015, he was named to the Futures All-Star team for the 2015 NBA D-League All-Star Game for the second time in his career.

=== Phoenix Suns (2015) ===
On March 11, 2015, Curry signed a 10-day contract with the Phoenix Suns. He made his Suns debut later that day in a 106–97 win over the Minnesota Timberwolves.

=== Return to Erie (2015) ===
After Curry's 10-day contract by the Suns expired on March 21, he returned to the BayHawks. In 43 games for Erie in 2014–15, he averaged 23.8 points, 3.9 rebounds, 4.2 assists and 1.4 steals per game.

=== Sacramento Kings (2015–2016) ===
In July 2015, Curry joined the New Orleans Pelicans for the 2015 NBA Summer League. After averaging 24.3 points per game in Las Vegas, Curry earned All-NBA Summer League first team honors. On July 22, he signed a two-year, $2 million guaranteed deal with the Sacramento Kings. Considered a "shooting guard trapped in a point guard's body", Curry's three-point shooting was a key reason the Kings signed him, as outside shooting had long been the Kings' Achilles heel. He made his debut for the Kings on October 30, recording two points, one rebound and one assist in a 132–114 win over the Los Angeles Lakers. On November 28, he scored 9 points on 3-of-4 shooting and 3-of-3 from three-point range in a loss to the Golden State Warriors. On February 26, 2016, Curry played extended minutes in the Kings' 117–107 loss to the Los Angeles Clippers due to starting point guard Rajon Rondo sitting out with an injury. In 26 minutes of action off the bench, he recorded a then career-high 19 points and 4 rebounds. On March 25, he made his first career start, scoring 12 points in 26 minutes against the Phoenix Suns. Three days later, in just his third NBA start, Curry scored a career-high 21 points in a 105–93 loss to the Portland Trail Blazers. He matched his career high on April 1, scoring 21 points against the Miami Heat. On April 9, he made a career-high six three-pointers and scored 20 points on 6-of-10 shooting off the bench in a 114–112 win over the Oklahoma City Thunder. Two days later, he recorded his first career double-double with 20 points and a career-high 15 assists in a career-high 38 minutes of action as the starting point guard, helping the Kings defeat the Phoenix Suns 105–101.

After the 2015–16 season, Curry declined his $1 million player option for the 2016–17 season in order to become a restricted free agent. On June 27, 2016, the Kings tendered a qualifying offer to Curry, but on July 3, the team rescinded their qualifying offer, making Curry an unrestricted free agent.

=== Dallas Mavericks (2016–2018) ===
On July 15, 2016, Curry signed with the Dallas Mavericks. He made his debut for the Mavericks in their season opener on October 26 against the Indiana Pacers. In 16 minutes off the bench, he recorded seven points, three rebounds, one assist and three steals in a 130–121 overtime loss. On November 8, he scored a then career-high 23 points in a 109–97 win over the Los Angeles Lakers. He tied that mark on November 21, scoring 23 points with five three-pointers as a starter in a 96–91 loss to the San Antonio Spurs. Curry missed four games in early December with a right knee sprain. On January 29, 2017, he had career highs of 24 points and 10 rebounds to lead the Mavericks to a 105–101 win over San Antonio. On February 24, 2017, he set a new career high with 31 points in a 97–84 loss to the Minnesota Timberwolves. Three days later, he had a 29-point effort to go with five three-pointers in a 96–89 win over the Miami Heat.

On October 7, 2017, Curry was ruled out indefinitely after being diagnosed with a stress reaction of his left tibia. On February 6, 2018, he was ruled out for the entire season after it was determined he required surgery on his left tibia.

=== Portland Trail Blazers (2018–2019) ===
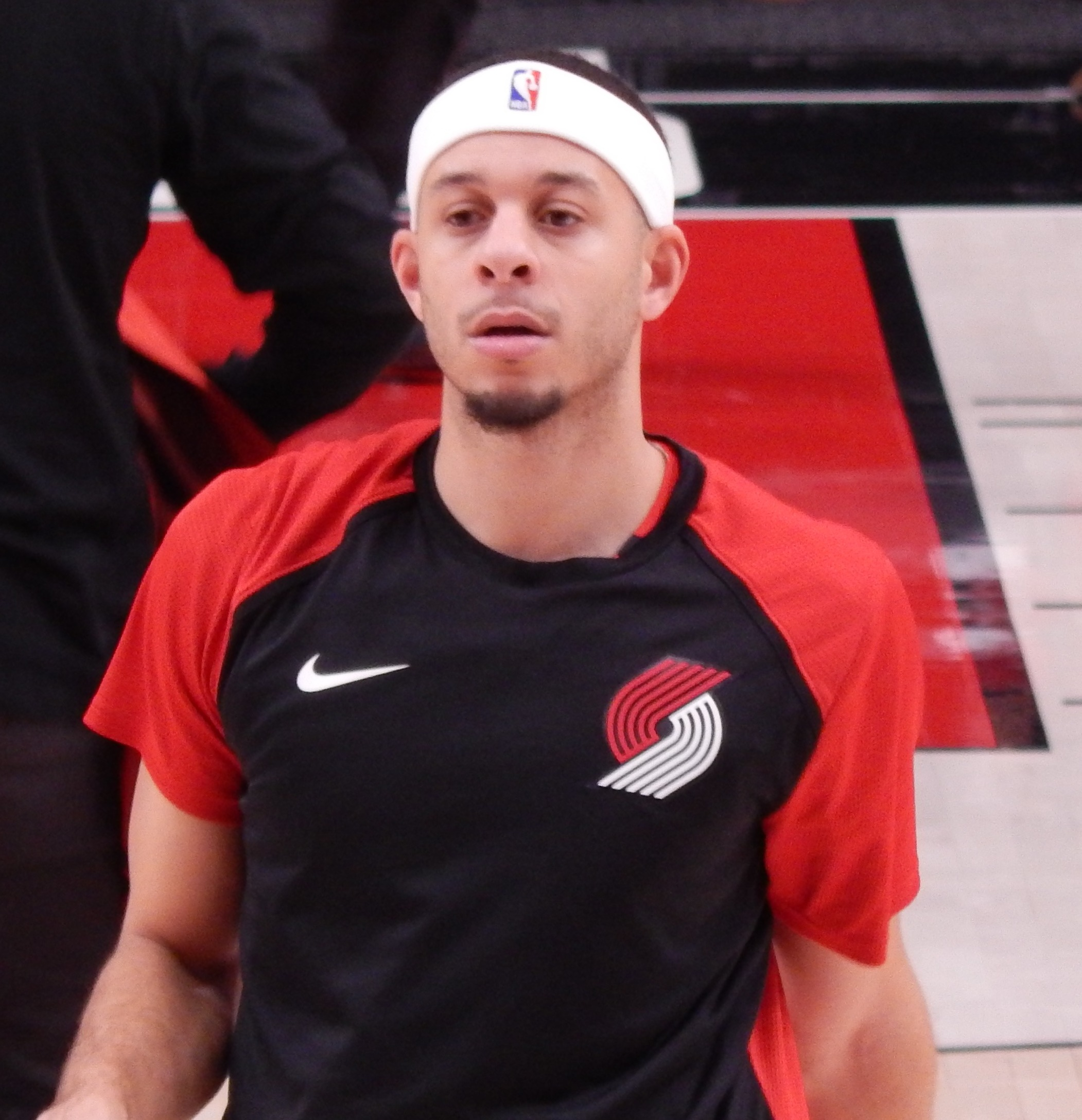
Curry with the Portland Trail Blazers in 2019

On July 6, 2018, Curry signed a two-year contract with the Portland Trail Blazers, which included a player option for the second year. On January 26, 2019, he scored 22 points in a 120–111 win over the Atlanta Hawks. On February 5, he was selected to compete in the Three-Point Contest during All-Star Weekend. On March 9, he scored 22 points in a 127–120 win over the Phoenix Suns. Curry later went to the 2019 NBA playoffs with Portland and reached the Western Conference Finals to face his brother Steph and the Golden State Warriors, who swept them 4–0 to knock them out of the playoffs. This marked the first time a set of brothers faced each other in an NBA playoff series.

=== Return to Dallas (2019–2020) ===
On July 10, 2019, he signed a four-year contract to return to the Dallas Mavericks. On February 28, 2020, Curry scored a career-high 37 points on 13-of-15 shooting and 8-of-9 from three-point range in a 126–118 loss to the Miami Heat.

=== Philadelphia 76ers (2020–2022) ===
On November 18, 2020, Curry was traded to the Philadelphia 76ers in exchange for Josh Richardson and the draft rights to Tyler Bey. It signified playing under his father-in-law Doc Rivers, who was hired as head coach that October.

In a Game 5 elimination of the Washington Wizards in the first round of the 2020-21 playoffs, he registered 30 points while shooting 10-17 overall and 3-6 from three. On June 16, 2021, during the second round, Curry recorded a new playoff career high of 36 points in a Game 5 losing effort against the Atlanta Hawks. He increased his scoring average in the seven-game series to 21.0 ppg, while maintaining an efficient 61% from the field and 59.6% from three on 7.4 attempts per game.

His 2021-22 time as a 76er marked his most minutes played per game (34.8) and points per game (15.0) before or since, as he continued to start in all 102 games he appeared in dating back to the previous season. Curry left the team as the all-time leader in 3-point percentage in franchise history at 42.6%, tying him with Dana Barros.

=== Brooklyn Nets (2022–2023) ===
On February 10, 2022, Curry was traded, along with Ben Simmons, Andre Drummond and two future first-round picks, to the Brooklyn Nets in exchange for James Harden and Paul Millsap. In his debut for the Nets on February 14, Curry led the team in scoring with 23 points in a 109–85 win against the Sacramento Kings and helped the team end an 11-game losing streak. On May 9, he underwent left ankle surgery.

=== Third stint with Dallas (2023–2024) ===
On July 14, 2023, he signed with the Dallas Mavericks for a third time.

=== Charlotte Hornets (2024–2025) ===
On February 8, 2024, Curry was traded to his hometown team Charlotte Hornets alongside Grant Williams and a 2027 first-round pick in exchange for P. J. Washington and two future second-round picks. On June 28, 2024, he was waived by the Hornets. However, he was re-signed on July 15, 2024. On October 24, 2024, Curry scored a season-high 15 points against the Miami Heat. Curry led the NBA in 3-point field goal percentage for the 2024-25 season, converting 45.6% of his 3-point attempts.

=== Golden State Warriors (2025–2026) ===
On October 1, 2025, Curry signed a one-year contract with the Golden State Warriors, joining his brother Stephen in their NBA careers for the first time since 2013. The Warriors waived him on October 18 with the expectation that they would re-sign him within the first few months of the season. Due to salary cap restrictions, they could not afford another veteran minimum contract until early November. Curry re-signed with the Warriors on a rest of season deal on December 1. On December 2, Curry made his Warriors debut, putting up 14 points on 6-of-7 shooting, including 2-of-3 from three, along with 2 rebounds, 2 assists, and one steal in 17 minutes off the bench in a loss to the Oklahoma City Thunder.

== National team career ==
Curry competed for the United States in the 2009 FIBA Under-19 World Championship in New Zealand, winning the tournament by defeating Greece 88–80 in the final. For the tournament, Curry averaged 9.0 points, 2.2 rebounds and 1.1 assists per game.

== Personal life ==
On September 14, 2019, Curry married former professional volleyball player Callie Rivers, daughter of his former head coach Doc Rivers and sister of his former Duke teammate Austin Rivers. They have three children. Curry's older brother, Stephen, is his former teammate and the starting point guard for the Golden State Warriors, while his younger sister, Sydel, played college volleyball at Elon University and is married to professional basketball player Damion Lee. Curry is a Pentecostal Christian.

== Career statistics ==
Legend
GP	Games played	GS	Games started	MPG	Minutes per game
FG%	Field goal percentage	3P%	3-point field goal percentage	FT%	Free throw percentage
RPG	Rebounds per game	APG	Assists per game	SPG	Steals per game
BPG	Blocks per game	PPG	Points per game	**Bold**	Career high
*	Led the league

=== NBA ===
==== Regular season ====
Year	Team	GP	GS	MPG	FG%	3P%	FT%	RPG	APG	SPG	BPG	PPG
2013–14	Memphis	1	0	4.1	—	—	—	.0	.0	.0	.0	.0
2013–14	Cleveland	1	0	8.8	.333	**1.000**	—	1.0	.0	**2.0**	.0	3.0
2014–15	Phoenix	2	0	3.9	.000	.000	—	1.0	.5	.0	.0	.0
2015–16	Sacramento	44	9	15.7	.455	.450	.833	1.4	1.5	.5	.1	6.8
2016–17	Dallas	70	42	29.0	.481	.425	.850	2.6	2.7	1.1	.1	12.8
2018–19	Portland	**74**	2	18.9	.456	.450	.846	1.6	.9	.5	.2	7.9
2019–20	Dallas	64	25	24.6	**.495**	.452	.825	2.3	1.9	.6	.1	12.4
2020–21	Philadelphia	57	**57**	28.7	.467	.450	.896	2.4	2.7	.8	.1	12.5
2021–22	Philadelphia	45	45	**34.8**	.485	.400	.877	**3.4**	**4.0**	.8	.2	**15.0**
2021–22	Brooklyn	19	19	29.9	.493	.468	.857	2.6	2.6	.9	.2	14.9
2022–23	Brooklyn	61	7	19.8	.463	.405	**.927**	1.6	1.6	.6	.1	9.2
2023–24	Dallas	36	3	12.7	.372	.363	.895	1.4	.8	.5	.1	4.3
2023–24	Charlotte	8	1	19.8	.441	.321	.917	2.0	1.8	.6	**.4**	9.0
2024–25	Charlotte	68	14	15.6	.478	.456*	.846	1.7	.9	.4	.1	6.5
2025–26	Golden State	10	0	13.3	.490	.480	.917	1.2	1.0	.3	.0	7.1
Career		560	224	22.3	.471	.433	.864	2.0	1.9	.6	.1	9.9

==== Playoffs ====
Year	Team	GP	GS	MPG	FG%	3P%	FT%	RPG	APG	SPG	BPG	PPG
2019	Portland	**16**	0	20.4	.366	.404	.818	1.6	.8	.8	**.3**	5.6
2020	Dallas	6	0	28.8	**.585**	.476	**1.000**	1.8	1.3	**1.0**	.0	12.8
2021	Philadelphia	12	**12**	31.8	.578	.506	.789	2.3	2.3	.8	.3	**18.8**
2022	Brooklyn	4	4	**33.0**	.564	**.522**	.667	**2.5**	**3.0**	.3	**.8**	14.5
2023	Brooklyn	3	0	19.4	.526	.333	.667	1.0	2.0	.0	.0	8.3
Career		41	16	26.1	.524	.468	.805	1.9	1.6	.7	.2	11.6

=== College ===
Year	Team	GP	GS	MPG	FG%	3P%	FT%	RPG	APG	SPG	BPG	PPG
2008–09	Liberty	35	34	**36.5**	.417	.347	.832	**4.4**	2.3	**1.4**	**.3**	**20.2**
2009–10	Duke	Did not play – transfer										
2010–11	Duke	**37**	19	25.0	.423	.435	.788	1.8	2.0	**1.4**	.1	9.0
2011–12	Duke	34	32	30.2	.420	.383	**.873**	2.6	**2.4**	1.3	.2	13.2
2012–13	Duke	35	**35**	32.3	**.465**	**.438**	.809	2.5	1.5	.9	.2	17.5
Career		141	120	30.9	.431	.394	.827	2.8	2.1	1.2	0.2	14.9

== See also ==
- List of NBA career 3-point field goal percentage leaders
- List of second-generation NBA players
