= Mychel Thompson =

Bahamian American basketball player (born 1988)

Personal information
- Born: June 1, 1988 (age 38) Los Angeles, California, U.S.
- Listed height: 6 ft 6 in (1.98 m)
- Listed weight: 211 lb (96 kg)

Career information
- High school: Santa Margarita Catholic (Rancho Santa Margarita, California); Stoneridge Prep (Simi Valley, California)
- College: Pepperdine (2007–2011)
- NBA draft: 2011: undrafted
- Playing career: 2011–2017
- Position: Shooting guard
- Number: 21

Career history
- 2011: Erie BayHawks
- 2011–2012: Cleveland Cavaliers
- 2012–2013: Erie BayHawks
- 2013: Sioux Falls Skyforce
- 2013–2015: Santa Cruz Warriors
- 2015: Pallacanestro Varese
- 2016–2017: Santa Cruz Warriors

Career highlights
- NBA D-League champion (2015); NBA D-League All-Rookie Second Team (2012)
- Stats at NBA.com
- Stats at Basketball Reference

Mychel Thompson (born June 1, 1988) is a Bahamian-American former professional basketball player. He played college basketball for the Pepperdine Waves. His father, Mychal Thompson, and brother, Klay Thompson, are also basketball players. His youngest brother Trayce Thompson played in Major League Baseball.

== Early life ==
Thompson was born on June 1, 1988, in Los Angeles, California to Mychal and Julie Thompson. His father, Mychal Thompson, was the first overall pick in the 1978 NBA draft and spent his 14-year career playing for the Portland Trail Blazers, Los Angeles Lakers and San Antonio Spurs in the NBA and Juvecaserta Basket in Italy.

Thompson has a younger brother, Klay, who played college basketball at Washington State University before being drafted in the first round of the 2011 NBA draft by the Golden State Warriors. His youngest brother, Trayce, was drafted in the 2nd round of the 2009 MLB draft by the Chicago White Sox. All three were raised Catholic.

Mychel played high school basketball at Jesuit High School in Portland, Oregon for two years, before finishing off his high school career at Santa Margarita Catholic High School in Rancho Santa Margarita, California. After high school, he played one year at Stoneridge Prep, located in Simi Valley, California. He averaged 4.9 points and 3.1 rebounds per game that season.

== College career ==
Heading into college, Thompson was rated as a two-star recruit by Rivals.com and the 91st-best fifth year player by Hoop Scoop Online. On November 9, 2006, he committed to playing for Pepperdine University. In his freshman season at Pepperdine, he started 24 of 32 games and averaged 8.1 points and 2.7 rebounds per game. He led the team in three pointers made with 56 and in three-point field goal percentage with 37.3% of his attempts going in. Thompson made a three-pointer in 30 of the 32 games he played. Against Northern Arizona, he scored a season-high 22 points, including five three-pointers.

Thompson started 30 of Pepperdine's 32 games in his sophomore season, averaging 9.6 points and 3.5 rebounds per game. He made 35 three-pointers that season, which tied him for the team lead. During the season, he made at least one three-pointer in 21 games. In the season opener, he scored a season-high 25 points against Cal State-Monterey Bay.

As a junior, Thompson averaged 11.8 points and 5.0 rebounds per game, en route to being named to the All–West Coast Conference honorable mention team. For the third straight season, he led the team in three-pointers made with 48. He tied his career-high of 25 points against the Utah Utes on December 23, 2009, and was later named the Co–West Coast Conference Player of the Week for his performance against Loyola Marymount, a game in which he scored 22 points and made six of his seven three-point attempts.

In his final season at Pepperdine, he averaged 14.6 points per game and 5.9 rebounds per game, both of which led the team. Thompson also led the team in three-pointers made for the fourth consecutive season with 53. For the second straight season, he was named to the All–WCC honorable mention team. Against the Nevada Wolf Pack, he scored a career-high 34 points. On February 2, 2011, he scored 31 points and grabbed 10 rebounds against the San Francisco Dons, becoming the first player from Pepperdine to record over 30 points and grab over 10 rebounds since 2005. Thompson finished his career at Pepperdine with 1,413 points, which is 14th best in school history. He also played in a school record 128 games and his 192 three-pointers made in his career was good enough for fourth highest in school history.

== Professional career ==
=== Erie BayHawks (2011) ===
Thompson went undrafted in the 2011 NBA draft. On November 3, 2011, he was selected by the Erie BayHawks in the third round of the 2011 NBA Development League Draft.

=== Cleveland Cavaliers (2011–2012) ===
On December 9, 2011, Thompson signed with the Cleveland Cavaliers. On February 6, 2012, he was waived by the Cavaliers after appearing in five games.

=== Return to Erie (2012) ===
On February 10, 2012, Thompson was re-acquired by the BayHawks.

In July 2012, Thompson joined the New York Knicks for the 2012 NBA Summer League. On September 11, 2012, he signed with the Knicks. However, he was later waived by the Knicks on October 27, 2012. On November 1, 2012, he was re-acquired by the Erie BayHawks.

=== Sioux Falls Skyforce (2013) ===
On January 3, 2013, Thompson was traded to the Sioux Falls Skyforce in a three-way trade involving the Rio Grande Valley Vipers and the Erie BayHawks.

=== Santa Cruz Warriors (2013–2015) ===
In July 2013, Thompson joined the Minnesota Timberwolves for the 2013 NBA Summer League. On November 4, 2013, the Sioux Falls Skyforce traded Thompson's rights to the Santa Cruz Warriors, the D-League affiliate of the Golden State franchise of the same name.

During that season in Santa Cruz, Thompson played in the backcourt with Seth Curry. At the same time, their respective brothers Klay and Steph were a prominent tandem in Golden State. Mychel and Seth were thus dubbed the "Splash Brothers" of the D-League.

On November 3, 2014, Thompson was reacquired by the Santa Cruz Warriors. On April 26, 2015, he won the D-League championship with the Warriors.

=== Pallacanestro Varese (2015) ===
On July 16, 2015, Thompson signed with Pallacanestro Varese of Italy. On December 22, he parted ways with Varese after appearing in nine league games and five FIBA Europe Cup games.

=== Return to Santa Cruz (2016–2017) ===
On February 27, 2016, Thompson was reacquired by Santa Cruz. That night, he made his season debut in a 133–124 loss to the Reno Bighorns, recording 16 points, one rebound and one assist in 23 minutes.

On November 11, 2016, Thompson was reacquired by the Santa Cruz Warriors. Thompson retired from professional basketball in 2018.

== International career ==
Thompson played for the Bahamas men's national basketball team during the 2022 FIBA AmeriCup qualification.

== NBA career statistics ==
Legend
GP	Games played	GS	Games started	MPG	Minutes per game
FG%	Field goal percentage	3P%	3-point field goal percentage	FT%	Free throw percentage
RPG	Rebounds per game	APG	Assists per game	SPG	Steals per game
BPG	Blocks per game	PPG	Points per game	**Bold**	Career high

=== Regular season ===
Year	Team	GP	GS	MPG	FG%	3P%	FT%	RPG	APG	SPG	BPG	PPG
2011–12	Cleveland	5	3	19.0	.292	.364	.000	1.0	1.4	.4	.2	3.6
Career		5	3	19.0	.292	.364	.000	1.0	1.4	.4	.2	3.6
