= Wardale =

Wardale is a surname. Notable people with this surname include:

- David Wardale, an English locomotive designer
- Edith Wardale (1863–1943), British philologist and literary scholar
- Geoffrey Wardale (1919–2017), British civil servant

== See also ==
- Wardle (disambiguation)
