= Paloma Gay y Blasco =

Social anthropologist

Paloma Gay y Blasco is a social anthropologist specialising in gender and Spanish Gitanos (Roma/Gypsies). She is a full-time lecturer at University of St Andrews and has published two books and several articles, including Gypsies in Madrid: Sex, Gender, and the Performance of Identity (1999 Oxford, Berg) and with Huon Wardle How to Read Ethnography (2008 London Routledge).
