= List of NBA career 3-point field goal percentage leaders =

A list of the top 50 NBA career regular season 3-point field goal percentages (minimum of 250 3-point field-goals made).

== List of 3-point percentage leaders ==
^	Active NBA player
*	Inducted into the Naismith Memorial Basketball Hall of Fame

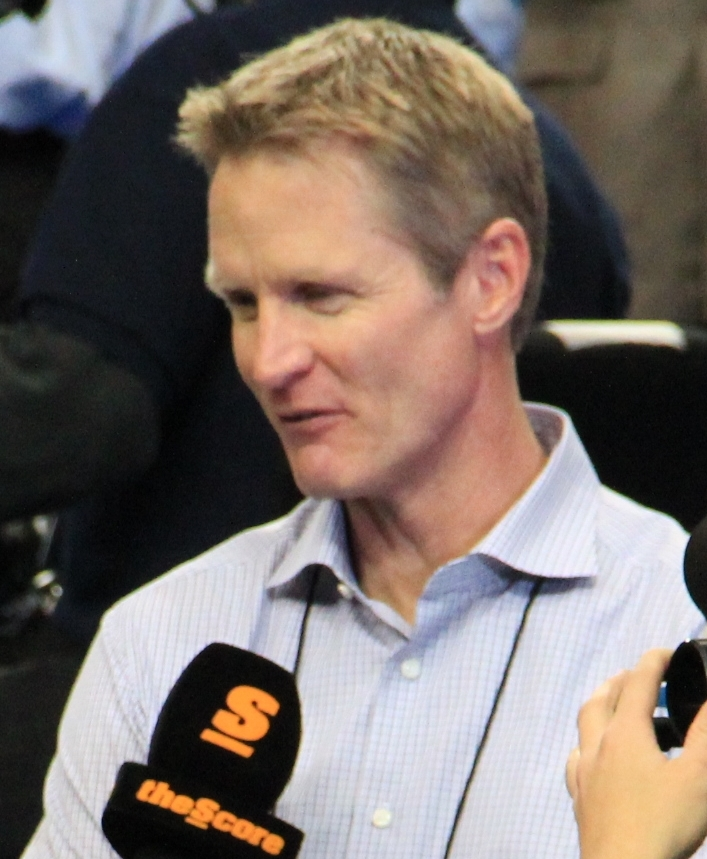
Steve Kerr has the highest 3-point shooting percentage in NBA history. Steve Kerr went on to coach the Golden State Warriors, redesigning their offense to center around 3-point shooting.

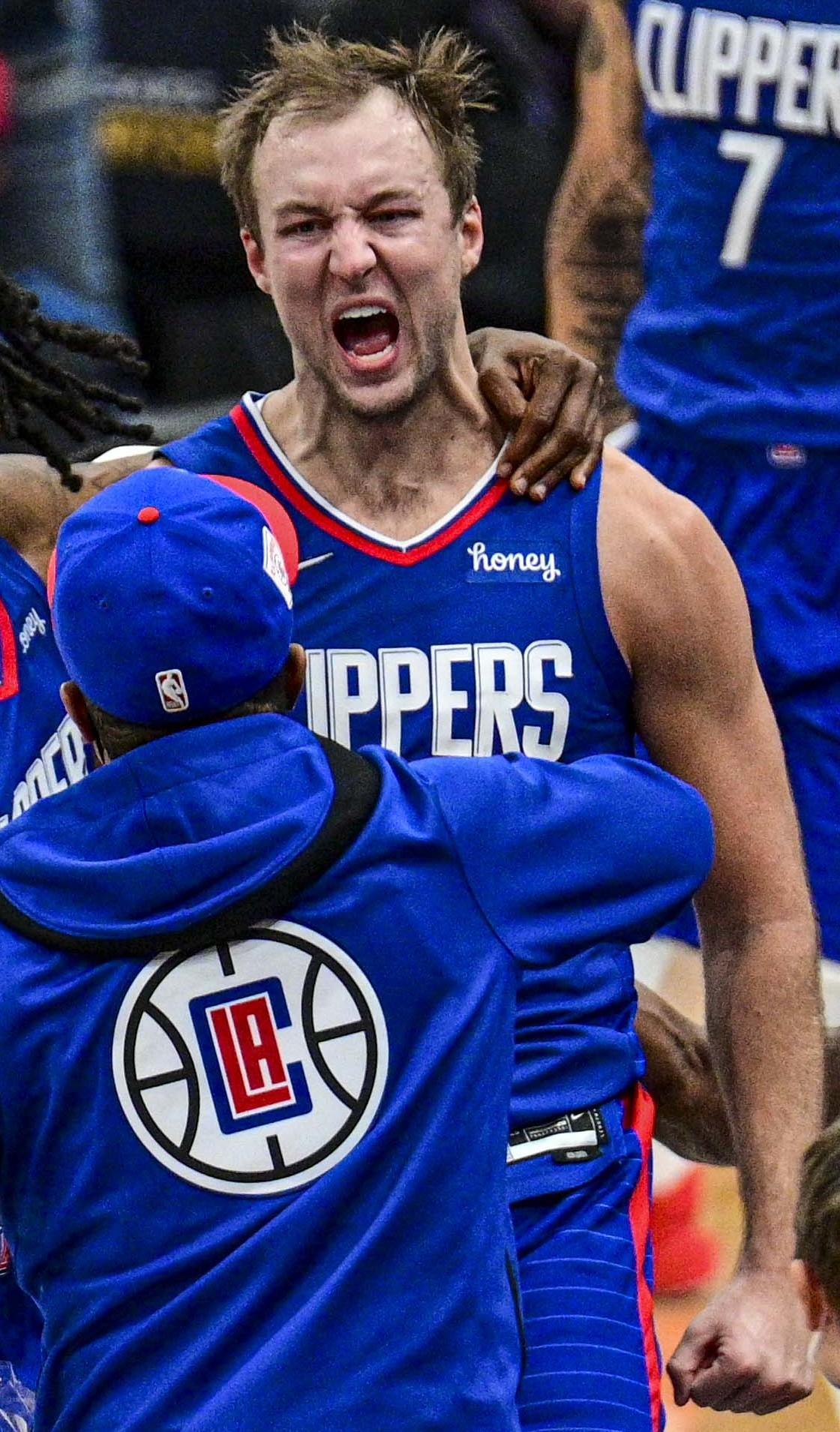
Luke Kennard leads all active players in 3-point shooting percentage.

Statistics accurate as of November 15, 2026.

Rank	Player	Pos	Team(s) played for (years) (Note: American Basketball Association (ABA) teams other than those admitted into the NBA in 1976 are not included; each year is linked to an article about that particular NBA season.)	3-point percentage	3-pointers made	3-pointers attempted
1	Steve Kerr	PG	Phoenix Suns (1988–1989); Cleveland Cavaliers (1989–1992); Orlando Magic (1992–1993); Chicago Bulls (1993–1998); San Antonio Spurs (1999–2001, 2002–2003); Portland Trail Blazers (2001–2002)	.4540	726	1,599
2	Luke Kennard^	SG	Detroit Pistons (2017–2020); Los Angeles Clippers (2020–2023); Memphis Grizzlies (2023–2025); Atlanta Hawks (2025–2026); Los Angeles Lakers (2026); Phoenix Suns (2026–present)	.4415	1,042	2,360
3	Hubert Davis	SG/PG	New York Knicks (1992–1996); Toronto Raptors (1996–1997); Dallas Mavericks (1997–2001); Washington Wizards (2001–2002); Detroit Pistons (2002–2004); New Jersey Nets (2004)	.4409	728	1,651
4	Dražen Petrović*	SG	Portland Trail Blazers (1989–1991); New Jersey Nets (1991–1993)	.4374	255	583
5	Joe Harris	SG/SF	Cleveland Cavaliers (2014–2016); Brooklyn Nets (2016–2023); Detroit Pistons (2023–2024)	.4359	1,026	2,354
6	Jason Kapono	SF	Cleveland Cavaliers (2003–2004); Charlotte Bobcats (2004–2005); Miami Heat (2005–2007); Toronto Raptors (2007–2009); Philadelphia 76ers (2009–2011); Los Angeles Lakers (2011–2012)	.4336	457	1,054
7	Seth Curry	SG	Memphis Grizzlies (2013–2014); Cleveland Cavaliers (2014); Phoenix Suns (2015); Sacramento Kings (2015–2016); Dallas Mavericks (2016–2018, 2019–2020, 2023–2024); Portland Trail Blazers (2018–2019); Philadelphia 76ers (2020–2022); Brooklyn Nets (2022–2023); Charlotte Hornets (2024–2025); Golden State Warriors (2025–2026)	.4334	957	2,208
8	Tim Legler	SG	Phoenix Suns (1990); Denver Nuggets (1990–1991); Utah Jazz (1992); Dallas Mavericks (1993–1994); Golden State Warriors (1995, 1999); Washington Bullets / Wizards (1995–1999)	.4312	260	603
9	Steve Novak	PF/SF	Houston Rockets (2006–2008); Los Angeles Clippers (2008–2010); Dallas Mavericks (2010–2011); San Antonio Spurs (2011); New York Knicks (2011–2013); Toronto Raptors (2013–2014); Utah Jazz (2014–2015); Oklahoma City Thunder (2015–2016); Milwaukee Bucks (2016–2017)	.4301	575	1,337
10	Kyle Korver	SG/SF	Philadelphia 76ers (2003–2007); Utah Jazz (2007–2010, 2018–2019); Chicago Bulls (2010–2012); Atlanta Hawks (2012–2017); Cleveland Cavaliers (2017–2018); Milwaukee Bucks (2019–2020)	.4287	2,450	5,715
11	Steve Nash*	PG	Phoenix Suns (1996–1998, 2004–2012); Dallas Mavericks (1998–2004); Los Angeles Lakers (2012–2015)	.4278	1,685	3,939
12	B. J. Armstrong	PG	Chicago Bulls (1989–1995, 1999–2000); Golden State Warriors (1995–1997); Charlotte Hornets (1997–1999); Orlando Magic (1999)	.4249	436	1,026
13	Kon Knueppel^	SF	Charlotte Hornets (2025–present)	.4246	273	643
14	Stephen Curry^	PG	Golden State Warriors (2009–present)	.4220	4,291	10,167
15	A. J. Green^	SG	Milwaukee Bucks (2022–present)	.4191	523	1,248
16	Wesley Person	SG	Phoenix Suns (1994–1997); Cleveland Cavaliers (1997–2002); Memphis Grizzlies (2002–2003); Portland Trail Blazers (2003–2004); Atlanta Hawks (2004); Miami Heat (2004–2005); Denver Nuggets (2005)	.4176	1,150	2,754
17	Anthony Morrow	SG	Golden State Warriors (2008–2010); New Jersey Nets (2010–2012); Atlanta Hawks (2012–2013); Dallas Mavericks (2013); New Orleans Pelicans (2013–2014); Oklahoma City Thunder (2014–2017); Chicago Bulls (2017)	.4166	807	1,937
18	JJ Redick	SG	Orlando Magic (2006–2013); Milwaukee Bucks (2013); Los Angeles Clippers (2013–2017); Philadelphia 76ers (2017–2019); New Orleans Pelicans (2019–2021); Dallas Mavericks (2021)	.4145	1,950	4,704
19	Matt Bonner	PF	Toronto Raptors (2004–2006); San Antonio Spurs (2006–2017)	.4145	797	1,923
20	Sam Hauser^	SF	Boston Celtics (2021–present)	.4134	749	1,812
21	Dana Barros	PG	Seattle SuperSonics (1989–1993); Philadelphia 76ers (1993–1995); Boston Celtics (1995–2000, 2004); Detroit Pistons (2000–2002)	.4110	1,090	2,652
22	Doug McDermott	SF/PF	Chicago Bulls (2014–2017); Oklahoma City Thunder (2017); New York Knicks (2017–2018); Dallas Mavericks (2018); Indiana Pacers (2018–2021, 2024); San Antonio Spurs (2021–2024); Sacramento Kings (2024–2026)	.4100	1,032	2,517
23	Bryn Forbes	SG	San Antonio Spurs (2016–2020, 2021–2022); Milwaukee Bucks (2020–2021); Denver Nuggets (2022); Minnesota Timberwolves (2022–2023)	.4098	720	1,757
24	Klay Thompson^	SG	Golden State Warriors (2011–2024); Dallas Mavericks (2024–2026); Miami Heat (2026–present)	.4091	2,947	7,204
25	Joe Ingles	SF	Utah Jazz (2014–2022); Milwaukee Bucks (2022–2023); Orlando Magic (2023–2024); Minnesota Timberwolves (2024–2026)	.4090	1,234	3,017
26	Trent Tucker	SG	New York Knicks (1982–1991); San Antonio Spurs (1991–1992); Chicago Bulls (1992–1993)	.4078	575	1,410
27	Daniel Gibson	PG/SG	Cleveland Cavaliers (2006–2013)	.4073	578	1,419
28	José Calderón	PG	Toronto Raptors (2005–2013); Detroit Pistons (2013, 2018–2019); Dallas Mavericks (2013–2014); New York Knicks (2014–2016); Los Angeles Lakers (2016–2017); Atlanta Hawks (2017); Cleveland Cavaliers (2017–2018)	.4071	920	2,260
29	Desmond Bane^	SG	Memphis Grizzlies (2020–2025); Orlando Magic (2025–present)	.4070	1,024	2,516
30	Mike Miller	SF/SG	Orlando Magic (2000–2003); Memphis Grizzlies (2003–2008, 2013–2014); Minnesota Timberwolves (2008–2009); Washington Wizards (2009–2010); Miami Heat (2010–2013); Cleveland Cavaliers (2014–2015); Denver Nuggets (2015–2017)	.4067	1,590	3,910
31	Wally Szczerbiak	SF	Minnesota Timberwolves (1999–2006); Boston Celtics (2006–2007); Seattle SuperSonics (2007–2008); Cleveland Cavaliers (2008–2009)	.4061	590	1,453
32	Raja Bell	SG	Philadelphia 76ers (2001–2002); Dallas Mavericks (2002–2003); Utah Jazz (2003–2005, 2010–2013); Phoenix Suns (2005–2008); Charlotte Bobcats (2008–2009); Golden State Warriors (2009–2010)	.4056	956	2,357
33	Brent Barry	SG	Los Angeles Clippers (1995–1998); Miami Heat (1998); Chicago Bulls (1999); Seattle SuperSonics (1999–2004); San Antonio Spurs (2004–2008); Houston Rockets (2008–2009)	.4053	1,395	3,442
34	Isaiah Joe^	SG	Philadelphia 76ers (2020–2022); Oklahoma City Thunder (2022–2026); Detroit Pistons (2026–present)	.4053	768	1,895
35	Grayson Allen^	SG	Utah Jazz (2018–2019); Memphis Grizzlies (2019–2021); Milwaukee Bucks (2021–2023); Phoenix Suns (2023–2026); Charlotte Hornets (2026–present)	.4046	1,058	2,615
36	Anthony Parker	SG	Philadelphia 76ers (1997–1999); Orlando Magic (1999–2000); Toronto Raptors (2006–2009); Cleveland Cavaliers (2009–2012)	.4043	596	1,474
37	Keon Ellis^	SG	Sacramento Kings (2022–2026); Cleveland Cavaliers (2026); Brooklyn Nets (2026–present)	.4031	316	784
38	Dale Ellis	SF/SG	Dallas Mavericks (1983–1986); Seattle SuperSonics (1986–1991, 1997–1999); Milwaukee Bucks (1991–1992, 1999–2000); San Antonio Spurs (1992–1994); Denver Nuggets (1994–1997); Charlotte Hornets (2000)	.4030	1,719	4,266
39	Jeff Hornacek	SG	Phoenix Suns (1986–1992); Philadelphia 76ers (1992–1994); Utah Jazz (1994–2000)	.4029	828	2,055
40	Luke Babbitt	SF/PF	Portland Trail Blazers (2010–2013); New Orleans Pelicans (2014–2016); Miami Heat (2016–2017, 2018); Atlanta Hawks (2017–2018)	.4024	394	979
41	Mark Price	PG	Cleveland Cavaliers (1986–1995); Washington Bullets (1996); Golden State Warriors (1996–1997); Orlando Magic (1997–1998)	.4020	976	2,428
42	Allan Houston	SG	Detroit Pistons (1993–1996); New York Knicks (1996–2005)	.4019	1,305	3,247
43	Dell Curry	SG	Utah Jazz (1986–1987); Cleveland Cavaliers (1987–1988); Charlotte Hornets (1988–1998); Milwaukee Bucks (1999); Toronto Raptors (1999–2002)	.4019	1,245	3,098
44	Ryan Rollins^	PG	Golden State Warriors (2022–2023); Washington Wizards (2023–2024); Milwaukee Bucks (2024–present)	.4018	260	647
45	Michael Dickerson	SG	Houston Rockets (1999); Vancouver / Memphis Grizzlies (1999–2003)	.4017	288	717
46	Brandon Rush	SG/SF	Indiana Pacers (2008–2011); Golden State Warriors (2011–2013, 2014–2016); Utah Jazz (2013–2014); Minnesota Timberwolves (2016–2017)	.4015	522	1,300
47	Ben Gordon	SG	Chicago Bulls (2004–2009); Detroit Pistons (2009–2012); Charlotte Bobcats (2012–2014); Orlando Magic (2014–2015)	.4009	1,171	2,921
48	Peja Stojaković	SF	Sacramento Kings (1998–2006); Indiana Pacers (2006); New Orleans Hornets (2006–2010); Toronto Raptors (2010–2011); Dallas Mavericks (2011)	.4007	1,760	4,392
49	James Jones	SF	Indiana Pacers (2003–2005); Phoenix Suns (2005–2007); Portland Trail Blazers (2007–2008); Miami Heat (2008–2014); Cleveland Cavaliers (2014–2017)	.4006	1,205	3,003
50	Ray Allen*	SG	Milwaukee Bucks (1996–2003); Seattle SuperSonics (2003–2007); Boston Celtics (2007–2012); Miami Heat (2012–2014)	.4002	2,973	7,429

== Progressive list of 3-point field goal percentage leaders ==
This is a progressive list of 3-point field goal percentage leaders showing how the record has increased through the years. Kyle Korver, who shot 53.64% from beyond the arc in 2009–10 NBA season, holds the all-time record for 3-point field goal percentage in a season (min. 110 attempts). Tony Snell, who is not included on the list, shot an all-time high 56.9% from beyond the arc (min. 50 attempts) in the 2020–21 NBA season on 62 made and 109 attempts.

Statistics accurate as of November 15, 2026.

^	Active NBA player
*	Inducted into the Naismith Memorial Basketball Hall of Fame

Team abbreviationsTeam(s) listed is the one player was on when he established the record.
ATL	Atlanta Hawks	GSW	Golden State Warriors	NJN	New Jersey Nets	SEA	Seattle SuperSonics
BKN	Brooklyn Nets	IND	Indiana Pacers	NYK	New York Knicks	TOR	Toronto Raptors
BOS	Boston Celtics	LAC	Los Angeles Clippers	PHI	Philadelphia 76ers	UTA	Utah Jazz
CHA	Charlotte Hornets	LAL	Los Angeles Lakers	PHX	Phoenix Suns	WSB	Washington Bullets
CHI	Chicago Bulls	MEM	Memphis Grizzlies	POR	Portland Trail Blazers		
CLE	Cleveland Cavaliers	MIA	Miami Heat	SAC	Sacramento Kings		
DAL	Dallas Mavericks	MIL	Milwaukee Bucks	SAS	San Antonio Spurs		
DET	Detroit Pistons	MIN	Minnesota Timberwolves	SDC	San Diego Clippers		

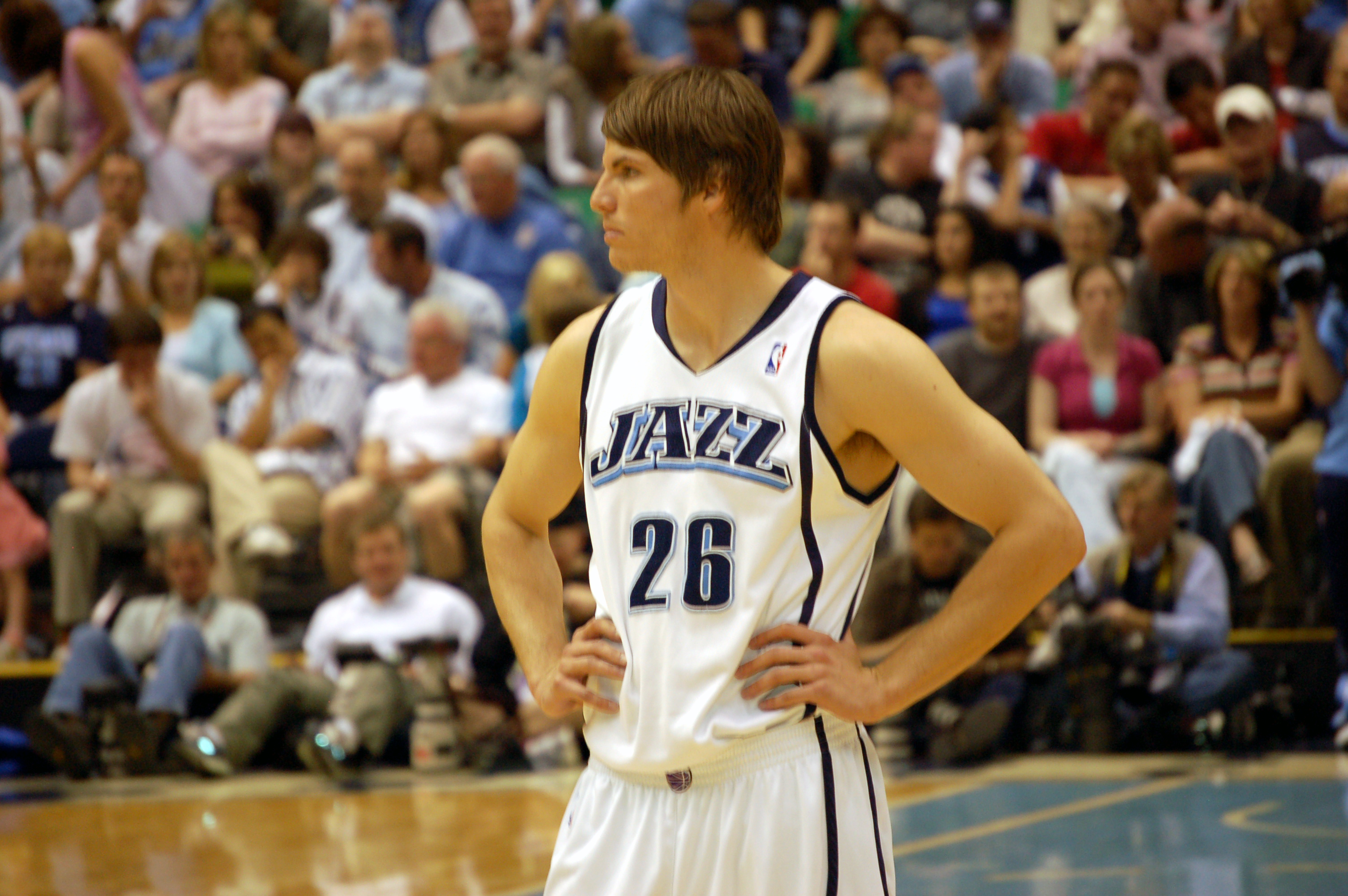
Kyle Korver holds the NBA record for the highest 3-point shooting percentage in a season, having made 53.6% of his 3-point attempts in the 2009–10 NBA season.

Progressive 3-point field goal percentage leaders
Season	Year-by-year leader	3P%	Active player leader	3P%	Career record	3P%	Single-season record	3P%	Season
1979–80	Fred BrownSEA	.4432	N/A		N/A		Fred BrownSEA	.4432	1979–80
1980–81	Brian TaylorSDC	.3826	N/A		N/A		Fred BrownSEA	.4432	1980–81
1981–82	Campy RussellNYK	.4386	N/A		N/A		Fred BrownSEA	.4432	1981–82
1982–83	Mike DunleavySAS	.3454	N/A		N/A		Fred BrownSEA	.4432	1982–83
1983–84	Darrell GriffithUTA	.3611	N/A		N/A		Fred BrownSEA	.4432	1983–84
1984–85	Byron ScottLAL	.4333	N/A		N/A		Fred BrownSEA	.4432	1984–85
1985–86	Craig HodgesMIL	.4506	Larry Bird*BOS	.3589	Larry Bird*BOS	.3589	Craig HodgesMIL	.4506	1985–86
1986–87	Kiki VanDeWeghePOR	.4815	Larry Bird*BOS	.3684	Larry Bird*BOS	.3684	Kiki VanDeWeghePOR	.4815	1986–87
1987–88	Craig HodgesMIL & PHX	.4914	Danny AingeBOS	.3887	Danny AingeBOS	.3887	Craig HodgesMIL & PHX	.4914	1987–88
1988–89	Jon SundvoldMIA	.5217	Trent TuckerNYK	.4142	Trent TuckerNYK	.4142	Jon SundvoldMIA	.5217	1988–89
1989–90	Steve KerrCLE	.5069	Mark PriceCLE	.4234	Mark PriceCLE	.4234	Jon SundvoldMIA	.5217	1989–90
1990–91	Jim LesSAC	.4610	Mark PriceCLE	.4182	Mark PriceCLE	.4182	Jon SundvoldMIA	.5217	1990–91
1991–92	Dana BarrosSEA	.4462	Mark PriceCLE	.4109	Mark PriceCLE	.4109	Jon SundvoldMIA	.5217	1991–92
1992–93	B. J. ArmstrongCHI	.4532	Dražen Petrović*NJN	.4374	Dražen Petrović*NJN	.4374	Jon SundvoldMIA	.5217	1992–93
1993–94	Tracy MurrayPOR	.4587	Mark PriceCLE	.4095	Dražen Petrović*NJN	.4374	Jon SundvoldMIA	.5217	1993–94
1994–95	Steve KerrCHI	.5235	Steve Kerr; CHI 1994–98; SAS 1999–2001; POR 2001–02; SAS 2002–03	.4668	Steve Kerr; CHI 1994–98; SAS 1999–2001; POR 2001–02; SAS 2002–03	.4668	Steve KerrCHI	.5235	1994–95
1995–96	Tim LeglerWSB	.5224	Steve Kerr; CHI 1994–98; SAS 1999–2001; POR 2001–02; SAS 2002–03	.4801	Steve Kerr; CHI 1994–98; SAS 1999–2001; POR 2001–02; SAS 2002–03	.4801	Steve KerrCHI	.5235	1995–96
1996–97	Glen RiceCHA	.4704	Steve Kerr; CHI 1994–98; SAS 1999–2001; POR 2001–02; SAS 2002–03	.4766	Steve Kerr; CHI 1994–98; SAS 1999–2001; POR 2001–02; SAS 2002–03	.4766	Steve KerrCHI	.5235	1996–97
1997–98	Dale EllisSEA	.4635	Steve Kerr; CHI 1994–98; SAS 1999–2001; POR 2001–02; SAS 2002–03	.4726	Steve Kerr; CHI 1994–98; SAS 1999–2001; POR 2001–02; SAS 2002–03	.4726	Steve KerrCHI	.5235	1997–98
1998–99	Dell CurryMIL	.4759	Steve Kerr; CHI 1994–98; SAS 1999–2001; POR 2001–02; SAS 2002–03	.4627	Steve Kerr; CHI 1994–98; SAS 1999–2001; POR 2001–02; SAS 2002–03	.4627	Steve KerrCHI	.5235	1998–99
1999–00	Hubert DavisDAL	.4910	Steve Kerr; CHI 1994–98; SAS 1999–2001; POR 2001–02; SAS 2002–03	.4640	Steve Kerr; CHI 1994–98; SAS 1999–2001; POR 2001–02; SAS 2002–03	.4640	Steve KerrCHI	.5235	1999–00
2000–01	Brent BarrySEA	.4760	Steve Kerr; CHI 1994–98; SAS 1999–2001; POR 2001–02; SAS 2002–03	.4620	Steve Kerr; CHI 1994–98; SAS 1999–2001; POR 2001–02; SAS 2002–03	.4620	Steve KerrCHI	.5235	2000–01
2001–02	Steve SmithSAS	.4715	Steve Kerr; CHI 1994–98; SAS 1999–2001; POR 2001–02; SAS 2002–03	.4590	Steve Kerr; CHI 1994–98; SAS 1999–2001; POR 2001–02; SAS 2002–03	.4590	Steve KerrCHI	.5235	2001–02
2002–03	Bruce BowenSAS	.4410	Steve Kerr; CHI 1994–98; SAS 1999–2001; POR 2001–02; SAS 2002–03	.4540	Steve Kerr; CHI 1994–98; SAS 1999–2001; POR 2001–02; SAS 2002–03	.4540	Steve KerrCHI	.5235	2002–03
2003–04	Anthony PeelerSAC	.4823	Hubert DavisDET & NJN	.4409	Steve Kerr; CHI 1994–98; SAS 1999–2001; POR 2001–02; SAS 2002–03	.4540	Steve KerrCHI	.5235	2003–04
2004–05	Fred HoibergMIN	.4828	Steve Nash*PHX	.4178	Steve Kerr; CHI 1994–98; SAS 1999–2001; POR 2001–02; SAS 2002–03	.4540	Steve KerrCHI	.5235	2004–05
2005–06	Richard HamiltonDET	.4583	Steve Nash*PHX	.4210	Steve Kerr; CHI 1994–98; SAS 1999–2001; POR 2001–02; SAS 2002–03	.4540	Steve KerrCHI	.5235	2005–06
2006–07	Jason Kapono; MIA 2006–07; TOR 2007–08	.5143	Steve Nash*PHX	.4256	Steve Kerr; CHI 1994–98; SAS 1999–2001; POR 2001–02; SAS 2002–03	.4540	Steve KerrCHI	.5235	2006–07
2007–08	Jason Kapono; MIA 2006–07; TOR 2007–08	.4830	Jason Kapono; TOR 2007–09; PHI 2009–10	.4637	Jason KaponoTOR	.4637	Steve KerrCHI	.5235	2007–08
2008–09	Anthony MorrowGSW	.4674	Jason Kapono; TOR 2007–09; PHI 2009–10	.4540	Steve Kerr; CHI 1994–98; SAS 1999–2001; POR 2001–02; SAS 2002–03	.4540	Steve KerrCHI	.5235	2008–09
2009–10	Kyle KorverUTA	.5364	Jason Kapono; TOR 2007–09; PHI 2009–10	.4396	Steve Kerr; CHI 1994–98; SAS 1999–2001; POR 2001–02; SAS 2002–03	.4540	Kyle KorverUTA	.5364	2009–10
2010–11	Matt BonnerSAS	.4565	Anthony MorrowNJN	.4474	Steve Kerr; CHI 1994–98; SAS 1999–2001; POR 2001–02; SAS 2002–03	.4540	Kyle KorverUTA	.5364	2010–11
2011–12	Steve NovakNYK	.4716	Stephen Curry^GSW	.4413	Steve Kerr; CHI 1994–98; SAS 1999–2001; POR 2001–02; SAS 2002–03	.4540	Kyle KorverUTA	.5364	2011–12
2012–13	José CalderónTOR & DET	.4610	Stephen Curry^GSW	.4463	Steve Kerr; CHI 1994–98; SAS 1999–2001; POR 2001–02; SAS 2002–03	.4540	Kyle KorverUTA	.5364	2012–13
2013–14	Kyle KorverATL	.4719	Stephen Curry^GSW	.4397	Steve Kerr; CHI 1994–98; SAS 1999–2001; POR 2001–02; SAS 2002–03	.4540	Kyle KorverUTA	.5364	2013–14
2014–15	Kyle KorverATL	.4922	Stephen Curry^GSW	.4405	Steve Kerr; CHI 1994–98; SAS 1999–2001; POR 2001–02; SAS 2002–03	.4540	Kyle KorverUTA	.5364	2014–15
2015–16	JJ RedickLAC	.4751	Stephen Curry^GSW	.4437	Steve Kerr; CHI 1994–98; SAS 1999–2001; POR 2001–02; SAS 2002–03	.4540	Kyle KorverUTA	.5364	2015–16
2016–17	Kyle KorverATL & CLE	.4512	Stephen Curry^GSW	.4378	Steve Kerr; CHI 1994–98; SAS 1999–2001; POR 2001–02; SAS 2002–03	.4540	Kyle KorverUTA	.5364	2016–17
2017–18	Darren CollisonIND	.4683	Stephen Curry^GSW	.4363	Steve Kerr; CHI 1994–98; SAS 1999–2001; POR 2001–02; SAS 2002–03	.4540	Kyle KorverUTA	.5364	2017–18
2018–19	Joe HarrisBKN	.4741	Seth Curry; POR 2018–19; DAL 2019–20; PHI 2020–22; BKN 2022	.4388	Steve Kerr; CHI 1994–98; SAS 1999–2001; POR 2001–02; SAS 2002–03	.4540	Kyle KorverUTA	.5364	2018–19
2019–20	George HillMIL	.4602	Seth Curry; POR 2018–19; DAL 2019–20; PHI 2020–22; BKN 2022	.4429	Steve Kerr; CHI 1994–98; SAS 1999–2001; POR 2001–02; SAS 2002–03	.4540	Kyle KorverUTA	.5364	2019–20
2020–21	Joe HarrisBKN	.4752	Seth Curry; POR 2018–19; DAL 2019–20; PHI 2020–22; BKN 2022	.4444	Steve Kerr; CHI 1994–98; SAS 1999–2001; POR 2001–02; SAS 2002–03	.4540	Kyle KorverUTA	.5364	2020–21
2021–22	Luke Kennard^ LAC 2021–23; MEM 2023	.4492	Seth Curry; POR 2018–19; DAL 2019–20; PHI 2020–22; BKN 2022	.4395	Steve Kerr; CHI 1994–98; SAS 1999–2001; POR 2001–02; SAS 2002–03	.4540	Kyle KorverUTA	.5364	2021–22
2022–23	Luke Kennard^ LAC 2021–23; MEM 2023	.4944	Joe HarrisBKN	.4372	Steve Kerr; CHI 1994–98; SAS 1999–2001; POR 2001–02; SAS 2002–03	.4540	Kyle KorverUTA	.5364	2022–23
2023–24	Grayson Allen^PHX	.4607	Luke Kennard^ MEM 2023–25; ATL 2025–26; LAL 2026; PHX 2026–	.4386	Steve Kerr; CHI 1994–98; SAS 1999–2001; POR 2001–02; SAS 2002–03	.4540	Kyle KorverUTA	.5364	2023–24
2024–25	Seth CurryCHA	.4560	Luke Kennard^ MEM 2023–25; ATL 2025–26; LAL 2026; PHX 2026–	.4379	Steve Kerr; CHI 1994–98; SAS 1999–2001; POR 2001–02; SAS 2002–03	.4540	Kyle KorverUTA	.5364	2024–25
2025–26	Luke Kennard^ATL & LAL	.4776	Luke Kennard^ MEM 2023–25; ATL 2025–26; LAL 2026; PHX 2026–	.4421	Steve Kerr; CHI 1994–98; SAS 1999–2001; POR 2001–02; SAS 2002–03	.4540	Kyle KorverUTA	.5364	2025–26
2026–27	Moritz Wagner^BKN	.6000	Luke Kennard^ MEM 2023–25; ATL 2025–26; LAL 2026; PHX 2026–	.4415	Steve Kerr; CHI 1994–98; SAS 1999–2001; POR 2001–02; SAS 2002–03	.4540	Kyle KorverUTA	.5364	2026–27
Season	Year-by-year leader	3P%	Active player leader	3P%	Career record	3P%	Single-season record	3P%	Season

== See also ==
- NBA records
- List of NBA career 3-point scoring leaders
- List of NBA annual 3-point field goal percentage leaders
- List of NBA annual 3-point scoring leaders
