= Sonya Curry =

Mother of American basketball players

- Born: Sonya Alicia Adams; May 30, 1966 (age 60); Radford, Virginia, U.S.
- Occupation: Educator
- Spouse: Dell Curry (m. 1988; div. 2021)
- Children: 3 (incl. Stephen and Seth)
- Relatives: Ayesha Curry (daughter-in-law); Damion Lee (son-in-law)

Sonya Alicia Curry (née Adams; born May 30, 1966) is an American educator and author. She is the mother of professional basketball players Stephen Curry and Seth Curry.

== Early life, education, and family ==
Sonya Alicia Adams was born in Radford, Virginia, to Cleive and Candy Adams. Adams is African-American. Some media outlets have described Adams as having both Black and Caucasian ancestry, while her daughter, Sydel Curry-Lee, has publicly clarified that their family is Black and not mixed, writing that "we are just light". The Adamses lived in poverty and experienced racism, including encounters with the Ku Klux Klan. At Radford High School, Adams participated in volleyball, track and field, and basketball; she then matriculated at Virginia Tech. At Virginia Tech, she played volleyball, earning all-conference honors in the Metro Conference as a junior. Adams earned a degree in education. According to her best friend and college roommate, the volleyball team was popular largely due to Adams.

Adams met her future husband, Dell Curry, at Virginia Tech. During her official recruiting visit to the school, she was watching the men's basketball practice when they noticed each other. She married Curry in 1988.

== Career ==
In 1995, Sonya Curry founded the Christian Montessori School of Lake Norman in Huntersville, North Carolina. Her children attended the school.

Curry published a parenting book, Fierce Love, in 2022. Subtitled "A Memoir of Family, Faith, and Purpose", the book explores her time raising her family, her passion for education, and the ways in which her faith has steadied her during life's most difficult moments.

== Personal life ==
Curry and her ex-husband, Dell Curry, have three children. Their elder son, Stephen, plays for the Golden State Warriors. He holds the all-time NBA record for three-pointers and has won four NBA championships with the team. Her younger son, Seth, also plays for the Golden State Warriors, joining his older brother for the 2025-2026 season. Her daughter, Sydel, played volleyball at Elon University.

When Seth was playing college ball with Duke, Curry's celebration of his three-point field goal against North Carolina in February 2013 had her trending on Twitter. She remained popular on the Internet during the Blue Devils' run in the 2013 NCAA tournament.

As she often receives camera time in the audience of Golden State games, Curry has been called NBA "royalty". She has been interviewed about how she successfully raised professional athletes and how the family has dealt with their sons' success.

Curry made a halfcourt shot to win a shooting competition at the 2019 NBA All-Star Weekend.

On August 23, 2021, Sonya and Dell Curry announced that they were divorcing after 33 years of marriage. The divorce was finalized in November 2021.
