= Wardell House =

Wardell House may refer to:

in the United States

(by state)

- Wardell House (Macon, Missouri), listed on the National Register of Historic Places in Macon County, Missouri
- Wardell House (Shrewsbury, New Jersey), listed on the National Register of Historic Places in Monmouth County, New Jersey

== See also ==
- The Wardell, Detroit, Michigan, listed on the NRHP in Detroit, Michigan
