= Huon Wardle =

Social anthropologist

Huon Wardle is a social anthropologist teaching at the University of St Andrews in Scotland. He is one of the key ethnographers of cosmopolitanism, and he draws both on philosophical and anthropological theory in his analyses. He is the author of An Ethnography of Cosmopolitanism in Kingston, Jamaica (Lewiston, New York: Edwin Mellen Press, 2000) and, with Paloma Gay y Blasco of How to Read Ethnography (Routledge 2007). He is the editor with Nigel Rapport of A Cosmopolitan Anthropology? (Special Issue of Social Anthropology, 2010), with Moisés Lino e Silva of Freedom in Practice: Governance Autonomy and Liberty in the Everyday (Routledge 2017) and with Justin Shaffner of Cosmopolitics (OAC Press 2017). He has written articles in The Journal of the Royal Anthropological Institute, Social Anthropology, and others and was awarded the Royal Anthropological Institute's J.B. Donne Prize in 2014.
