= Robert Arnold Wardle =

Canadian zoologist (1890-1974)

Robert Arnold Wardle (November 1890 – 2 January 1974) was an England-born Canadian professor of zoology and applied biology who worked at the University of Manitoba. He wrote several textbooks on applied biology including on entomology and parasitology.

Wardle was born in Clifton, England, to Robert and Mary Ellen Wardle. He went to Manchester Grammar School before going to Manchester University. He attended chemistry lectures by Ernest Rutherford and in 1912 he graduated in zoology and worked as a lecturer in the University of London. He received a master's degree in 1914 with studies on the larch sawfly. During World War I he served with the Royal Welsh Fusiliers in France and was wounded towards the end of the war in 1918. He returned to work as a lecturer in zoology at Manchester University. He worked on cotton pests in Sudan in 1923-24 and in 1927 he visited the University of Minnesota as a Rockefeller visiting professor. In 1928 he joined the University of Manitoba as head of zoology. His classes were filled with stories, humour and wit and he supervised 30 master's students and 2 doctorates including that of J. A. McLeod with whom he wrote a landmark "The Zoology of Tapeworms" (1974). He was especially interested in the interaction of art and science and once stated that "Universities should always be predominantly arts and the humanities. You can learn sciences, even the most complicated ones, in technical schools" and offered special courses on genetics and evolution for arts students. He promoted the idea of small universities where students would know their professors personally. He also gave popular talks on the radio. After retiring in 1958 he became professor emeritus at Manitoba but took up a position at the University of Winnipeg to establish and zoology department retiring from it in 1962.
