= Dell Curry =

American basketball player (born 1964)

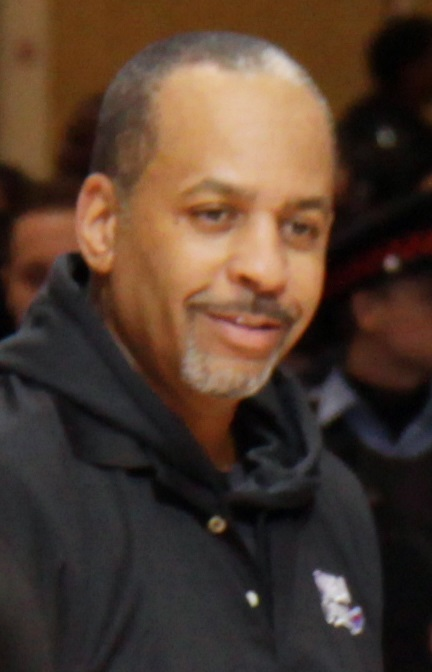
- Curry in 2016

Personal information
- Born: June 25, 1964 (age 62) Harrisonburg, Virginia, U.S.
- Listed height: 6 ft 5 in (1.96 m)
- Listed weight: 205 lb (93 kg)

Career information
- High school: Fort Defiance (Fort Defiance, Virginia)
- College: Virginia Tech (1982–1986)
- NBA draft: 1986: 1st round, 15th overall pick
- Drafted by: Utah Jazz
- Playing career: 1986–2002
- Position: Shooting guard
- Number: 30

Career history
- 1986–1987: Utah Jazz
- 1987–1988: Cleveland Cavaliers
- 1988–1998: Charlotte Hornets
- 1999: Milwaukee Bucks
- 1999–2002: Toronto Raptors

Career highlights
- NBA Sixth Man of The Year (1994); No. 30 retired by Charlotte Hornets; Consensus second-team All-American (1986); Metro Conference Player of the Year (1986); 3× First-team All-Metro Conference (1984–1986); No. 30 retired by Virginia Tech Hokies; Fourth-team Parade All-American (1982); McDonald's All-American (1982); Virginia Mr. Basketball (1982)

Career NBA statistics
- Points: 12,670 (11.7 ppg)
- Rebounds: 2,617 (2.4 rpg)
- Assists: 1,909 (1.8 apg)
- Stats at NBA.com
- Stats at Basketball Reference

Wardell Stephen Curry Sr. (born June 25, 1964) is an American former professional basketball player. He played in the National Basketball Association (NBA) from 1986 until 2002 and retired as the Charlotte Hornets' all-time leader in points (9,839) and three-point field goals made (929). Curry works as a color commentator, alongside Eric Collins, on Charlotte Hornets television broadcasts. He is the father of NBA players Stephen Curry and Seth Curry.

== Early life ==
Born in Harrisonburg, Virginia, Curry was raised in Grottoes and played high school basketball at Fort Defiance, where he used his coach's barn to practice shooting daily. He finished as the all-time leading scorer in school history, and was named a McDonald's All-American in 1982. Curry also played baseball, and won state championships in both sports; he was selected by the Texas Rangers in the 1982 Major League Baseball draft.

== College career ==
Curry was a four-year starter at Virginia Tech in Blacksburg along with contemporaries Bobby Beecher, Perry Young, Al Young, and Keith Colbert. The Hokies appeared in the National Invitation Tournament (NIT) in 1983 and 1984, finishing third in the latter. Although the team qualified for at-large bids to the NCAA tournament in 1985 and 1986, it lost in the first round on both occasions. In his senior season in 1986, Curry was named the player of the year in the Metro Conference. Prior to the 1986–87 season, NCAA basketball did not feature a three-point line; Curry's accurate long-range shooting was not rewarded, as it would be later in his NBA career. (In the early and mid 1980s, the three-point line was introduced in many conferences at varying distances, but it was not recognized by the NCAA.)

Curry also played baseball for Virginia Tech. He was selected by the Baltimore Orioles in the 14th round of the 1985 MLB draft but opted to continue playing basketball.

Curry finished his Virginia Tech career with 2,389 points (second all-time) and 295 steals (all-time leader) in basketball, and a 6–1 record with a 3.81 ERA in baseball.

He was inducted into the Virginia Tech Sports Hall of Fame in 1996, his first year of eligibility.

== Professional career ==
Curry was selected with the 15th overall pick by the Utah Jazz in the 1986 NBA draft. He played one season in Utah before being traded to the Cleveland Cavaliers in 1987, where he spent the 1987–88 season. He was left unprotected by Cleveland for the 1988 NBA expansion draft and was the second player selected, the first by the Charlotte Hornets. Curry spent 10 seasons in Charlotte, mostly coming off the bench to provide instant offense with three-point shooting. He was a regular in the discussions for Sixth Man of the Year and won the honor in the 1993–94 season. He was once the franchise's all-time statistical leader in points, games played, three-point field goals made and attempted, and three-point field goal percentage. When he left the team in 1998, he was the last player remaining from its inaugural season 10 years earlier.

Curry played one season for the Milwaukee Bucks before playing his final three seasons in the NBA for the Toronto Raptors. He holds career averages of 11.7 points, 2.4 rebounds, and 1.8 assists. Curry retired as the all-time leading scorer in Hornets history with 9,839 points.

== NBA career statistics ==
Legend
GP	Games played	GS	Games started	MPG	Minutes per game
FG%	Field goal percentage	3P%	3-point field goal percentage	FT%	Free throw percentage
RPG	Rebounds per game	APG	Assists per game	SPG	Steals per game
BPG	Blocks per game	PPG	Points per game	**Bold**	Career high
*	Led the league

=== Regular season ===
Year	Team	GP	GS	MPG	FG%	3P%	FT%	RPG	APG	SPG	BPG	PPG
1986–87	Utah	67	0	9.5	.426	.283	.789	1.2	.9	.4	.1	4.9
1987–88	Cleveland	79	8	19.0	.458	.346	.782	2.1	1.9	1.2	.3	10.0
1988–89	Charlotte	48	0	16.9	**.491**	.345	.870	2.2	1.0	.9	.1	11.9
1989–90	Charlotte	67	13	27.8	.466	.354	**.923**	2.5	2.4	**1.5**	**.4**	16.0
1990–91	Charlotte	76	14	19.9	.471	.372	.842	2.6	2.2	1.0	.3	10.6
1991–92	Charlotte	77	0	26.2	.486	.404	.836	3.4	2.3	1.2	.3	15.7
1992–93	Charlotte	80	0	26.2	.452	.401	.866	**3.6**	2.3	1.1	.3	15.3
1993–94	Charlotte	**82**	0	26.5	.455	.402	.873	3.2	**2.7**	1.2	.3	**16.3**
1994–95	Charlotte	69	0	24.9	.441	.427	.856	3.4	1.6	.8	.3	13.6
1995–96	Charlotte	**82**	**29**	28.9	.453	.404	.854	3.2	2.1	1.3	.3	14.5
1996–97	Charlotte	68	20	**30.6**	.459	.426	.803	3.1	1.7	.9	.2	14.8
1997–98	Charlotte	52	1	18.7	.447	.421	.788	1.9	1.3	.6	.1	9.4
1998–99	Milwaukee	42	0	20.6	.485	**.476***	.824	2.0	1.1	.9	.1	10.1
1999–00	Toronto	67	9	16.3	.427	.393	.750	1.5	1.3	.5	.1	7.6
2000–01	Toronto	71	1	13.5	.424	.428	.843	1.2	1.1	.4	.1	6.0
2001–02	Toronto	56	4	15.8	.406	.344	.892	1.4	1.1	.4	.1	6.4
Career		1,083	99	21.7	.457	.402	.843	2.4	1.8	.9	.2	11.7

=== Playoffs ===
Year	Team	GP	GS	MPG	FG%	3P%	FT%	RPG	APG	SPG	BPG	PPG
1987	Utah	2	0	2.0	.000	.000	—	.0	.0	.0	.0	0.0
1988	Cleveland	2	0	8.5	.250	.000	—	.5	1.0	.0	**.5**	1.0
1993	Charlotte	9	0	24.7	.433	.286	.818	**3.6**	**2.0**	**1.4**	.0	11.0
1995	Charlotte	4	0	**26.8**	.471	.429	.909	2.3	1.5	.0	.0	**12.8**
1997	Charlotte	3	**1**	16.7	.294	.250	**1.000**	.3	1.7	1.3	.0	4.7
1998	Charlotte	9	0	19.0	**.593**	.250	.857	2.1	1.1	.8	.3	5.8
1999	Milwaukee	3	0	16.3	.404	.125	**1.000**	1.3	.3	1.0	.0	3.0
2000	Toronto	3	0	10.0	.133	.667	.500	.7	.3	.7	.0	2.3
2001	Toronto	**12**	0	15.2	.500	.378	.833	1.2	.8	.5	.1	6.5
2002	Toronto	4	0	14.8	.422	**.800**	**1.000**	1.3	1.0	1.3	**.5**	7.0
Career		51	1	17.5	.400	.350	.870	1.7	1.1	.8	.1	6.7

== Post-playing career ==
In 2004, Curry was inducted into the Virginia Sports Hall of Fame.

On June 18, 2007, Curry was named an assistant coach of the NBA's Charlotte Bobcats, but he stepped down before the season began so that he could attend his sons' basketball games.

In 2009, Curry started working as a commentator, alongside longtime play-by-play announcer Steve Martin, for the Charlotte Bobcats (now Charlotte Hornets).

In 2016, Curry was the recipient of the Bobby Jones Award at the Athletes in Action All Star Breakfast, which is held each year at the NBA All Star Weekend.

On March 19, 2026, Curry had his number 30 jersey retired by the Charlotte Hornets organization for his milestones and accomplishments with the franchise.

== Personal life ==
In 1995, Dell and his wife, Sonya (née Adams), founded the Christian Montessori School of Lake Norman, a preschool in Huntersville, North Carolina.

In 1998, Curry established a charitable foundation, the Dell Curry Foundation, which is a youth oriented program in Charlotte, North Carolina. The foundation runs five learning centers in Charlotte to provide educational training and drug abuse counseling.

Curry married his college sweetheart Sonya in 1988. They have three children, Stephen, Seth, and Sydel. Stephen plays point guard for the Golden State Warriors, and is considered the greatest shooter of all time. Seth has also had an NBA career, last playing for the Warriors. Curry's daughter Sydel played volleyball at Elon University.

On August 23, 2021, Curry and his wife, Sonya, announced that they were divorcing after 33 years of marriage. He remarried around 2023 to wife Nicki.

== See also ==
- List of National Basketball Association career 3-point field goal percentage leaders
