= List of NBA postseason records =

This article lists all-time records achieved in the NBA post-season in major categories recognized by the league, including those set by teams and individuals in single games, series, and careers. The NBA also recognizes records from its original incarnation, the Basketball Association of America.

== Playoff records ==
=== Game ===
==== Points ====
- Most points in a game, playoffs

- 63 by Michael Jordan, Chicago Bulls at Boston Celtics on April 20, 1986 (2 OT)

- Most points in a half, playoffs

- 39 by Sleepy Floyd, Golden State Warriors vs. Los Angeles Lakers on May 10, 1987 (2nd)
- 39 by Donovan Mitchell, Cleveland Cavaliers vs. Detroit Pistons on May 11, 2026 (2nd)

- Most points in a quarter, playoffs

- 29 by Sleepy Floyd, Golden State Warriors vs. Los Angeles Lakers on May 10, 1987 (4th)

- Most points in an overtime period, playoffs

- 17 by Stephen Curry, Golden State Warriors vs. Portland Trail Blazers on May 9, 2016

- Most consecutive points by single player on team, playoffs:

- 25 by LeBron James, Cleveland Cavaliers vs. Detroit Pistons on May 31, 2007

- 40-point scoring duos, playoffs

- 45 by Elgin Baylor and 41 by Jerry West, Los Angeles Lakers vs. Detroit Pistons on March 29, 1962
- 42 by Sleepy Floyd and 41 by Hakeem Olajuwon, Houston Rockets vs. Dallas Mavericks on April 30, 1988
- 41 by Clyde Drexler and 40 by Hakeem Olajuwon, Houston Rockets vs. Utah Jazz on May 5, 1995
- 40 by Reggie Miller and Jalen Rose, Indiana Pacers vs. Philadelphia 76ers on May 6, 2000
- 41 by LeBron James and Kyrie Irving, Cleveland Cavaliers vs. Golden State Warriors on June 13, 2016
- 47 by Anthony Davis and 41 by Jrue Holiday, New Orleans Pelicans vs. Portland Trail Blazers on April 21, 2018

- 50-point scoring opponents, playoffs

- On August 23, 2020, Donovan Mitchell scored 51 points and Jamal Murray scored 50 points between the Utah Jazz and the Denver Nuggets

==== Field goals ====
- Most field goals made in a game, playoffs

- 24 by Wilt Chamberlain, Philadelphia Warriors vs. Syracuse Nationals on March 14, 1960
- 24 by John Havlicek, Boston Celtics vs. Atlanta Hawks on April 1, 1973
- 24 by Michael Jordan, Chicago Bulls vs. Cleveland Cavaliers on May 1, 1988

- Most field goals made in a game, no misses, playoffs

- 14 by Chris Paul, Phoenix Suns vs. New Orleans Pelicans on April 28, 2022

- Most field goals attempted in a game, playoffs

- 48 by Wilt Chamberlain, Philadelphia Warriors vs. Syracuse Nationals on March 22, 1962
- 48 by Rick Barry, San Francisco Warriors vs. Philadelphia 76ers on April 18, 1967

- Most field goals missed in a game, playoffs

- 38 by Joe Fulks, Philadelphia Warriors vs. St. Louis Bombers on March 30, 1948 (8/46)

- Most field goals attempted in a game, none made, playoffs

- 14 by Chick Reiser, Baltimore Bullets at Philadelphia Warriors on April 10, 1948
- 14 by Dennis Johnson, Seattle SuperSonics vs. Washington Bullets on June 7, 1978

- Most field goals made in a half, playoffs

- 16 by Dave Bing, Detroit Pistons vs. Boston Celtics on April 1, 1968

- Most field goals attempted in a half, playoffs

- 28 by Russell Westbrook, Oklahoma City Thunder vs. Houston Rockets on April 19, 2017
- 28 by Russell Westbrook, Oklahoma City Thunder vs. Utah Jazz on April 27, 2018

- Most field goals made in a quarter, playoffs

- 12 by Sleepy Floyd, Golden State Warriors vs. Los Angeles Lakers on May 10, 1987

- Most field goals attempted in a quarter, playoffs

- 18 by Russell Westbrook, Oklahoma City Thunder vs. Houston Rockets on April 19, 2017

- Most consecutive field goals made in a quarter, playoffs

- 12 by Sleepy Floyd, Golden State Warriors vs. Los Angeles Lakers on May 10, 1987

- Most consecutive field goals made in a game, playoffs

- 14 by Chris Paul, Phoenix Suns at New Orleans Pelicans on April 28, 2022

- Most 3-point field goals made in a game, playoffs

- 12 by Damian Lillard, Portland Trail Blazers at Denver Nuggets on June 1, 2021

- Most 3-point field goals made in a game, no misses, playoffs

- 7 by Robert Horry, Los Angeles Lakers at Utah Jazz on May 6, 1997

- Most 3-point field goals attempted in a game, playoffs

- 19 by Russell Westbrook, Oklahoma City Thunder vs. Utah Jazz, April 27, 2018

- Most 3-point field goals made in a half, playoffs

- 8 by Vince Carter, Toronto Raptors vs. Philadelphia 76ers on May 11, 2001
- 8 by Damian Lillard, Portland Trail Blazers vs. Denver Nuggets on May 24, 2021

- Most 3-point field goals attempted in a half, playoffs

- 15 by Russell Westbrook, Oklahoma City Thunder vs. Utah Jazz, April 27, 2018

- Most 3-point field goals made in a quarter, playoffs

- 6 by Antoine Walker, Boston Celtics at Philadelphia 76ers on April 28, 2002
- 6 by Damian Lillard, Portland Trail Blazers vs. Denver Nuggets on May 24, 2021
- 6 by Michael Porter Jr., Denver Nuggets at Portland Trail Blazers on June 3, 2021
- 6 by Devin Booker, Phoenix Suns at Los Angeles Lakers on June 3, 2021
- 6 by Bojan Bogdanovic, Utah Jazz vs. Los Angeles Clippers on June 17, 2021
- 6 by Stephen Curry, Golden State Warriors vs. Boston Celtics on June 2, 2022

- Most consecutive 3-point field goals made in a half, playoffs

- 8 by Vince Carter, Toronto Raptors vs. Philadelphia 76ers on May 11, 2001

- Most consecutive 3-point field goals made in a game, playoffs

- 8 by Vince Carter, Toronto Raptors vs. Philadelphia 76ers on May 11, 2001
- 8 by Chris Paul, Los Angeles Clippers at Oklahoma City Thunder on May 5, 2014

==== Free throws ====
- Most free throws made in a game, playoffs

- 30 by Bob Cousy, Boston Celtics vs. Syracuse Nationals on March 21, 1953 (4 OT) (30/32)

- Most free throws made in a game, no misses, playoffs

- 24 by Dirk Nowitzki, Dallas Mavericks vs. Oklahoma City Thunder on May 17, 2011

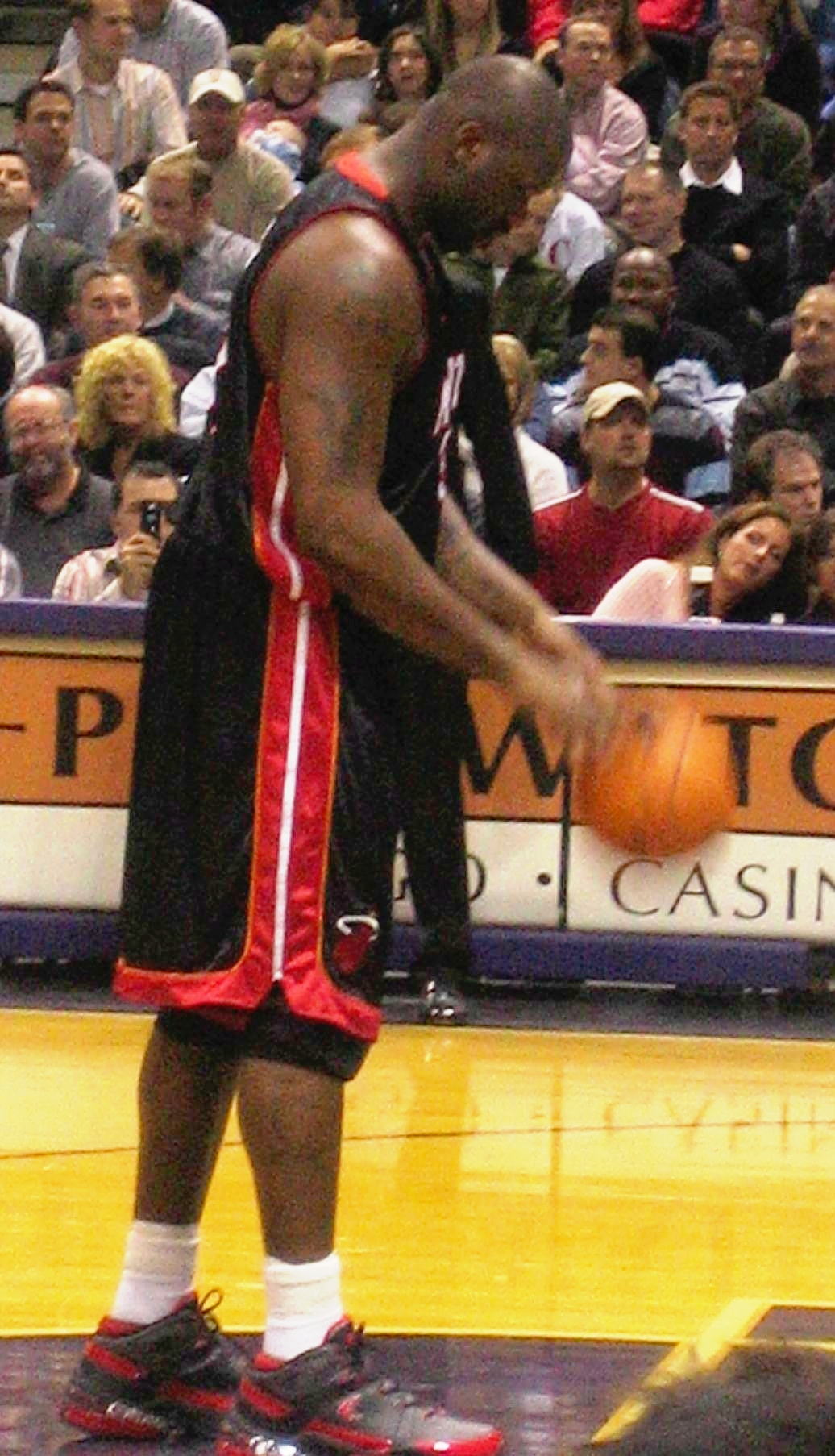
Shaquille O'Neal holds the Playoff records for free throws attempted in a quarter & game.

- Most free throws attempted in a game, playoffs

- 39 by Shaquille O'Neal, Los Angeles Lakers vs. Indiana Pacers on June 9, 2000 (18/39)

- Most free throws made in a half, playoffs

- 19 by Magic Johnson, Los Angeles Lakers vs. Golden State Warriors on May 8, 1991
- 19 by Karl Malone, Utah Jazz vs. Portland Trail Blazers on May 9, 1991
- 19 by Charles Barkley, Phoenix Suns vs. Seattle SuperSonics on June 5, 1993
- 19 by Dirk Nowitzki, Dallas Mavericks vs. Oklahoma City Thunder on May 17, 2011

- Most free throws attempted in a half, playoffs

- 28 by DeAndre Jordan, Los Angeles Clippers vs. Houston Rockets on May 10, 2015 (10/28)

- Most free throws made in a quarter, playoffs

- 13 by Michael Jordan, Chicago Bulls vs. Detroit Pistons on May 21, 1991
- 13 by Dirk Nowitzki, Dallas Mavericks vs. Portland Trail Blazers on April 16, 2011
- 13 by Dirk Nowitzki, Dallas Mavericks vs. Oklahoma City Thunder on May 17, 2011

- Most free throws attempted in a quarter, playoffs

- 25 by Shaquille O'Neal, Los Angeles Lakers vs. Portland Trail Blazers on May 20, 2000

==== Rebounds ====
- Most rebounds in a game, playoffs

- 41 by Wilt Chamberlain, Philadelphia 76ers vs. Boston Celtics on April 5, 1967

- Most rebounds in a half, playoffs

- 26 by Wilt Chamberlain, Philadelphia 76ers vs. San Francisco Warriors on April 16, 1967

- Most rebounds in a quarter, playoffs

- 19 by Bill Russell, Boston Celtics vs. Los Angeles Lakers on April 18, 1962

- Note: this exceeds the regular season record of 18 by Nate Thurmond

- Most offensive rebounds in a game, playoffs

- 15 by Moses Malone, Houston Rockets vs. Washington Bullets on April 21, 1977 (OT)

- Most defensive rebounds in a game, playoffs

- 20 by Dave Cowens, Boston Celtics at Houston Rockets on April 22, 1975
- 20 by Dave Cowens, Boston Celtics at Philadelphia 76ers on May 1, 1977
- 20 by Bill Walton, Portland Trail Blazers at Philadelphia 76ers, June 3, 1977
- 20 by Bill Walton, Portland Trail Blazers vs. Philadelphia 76ers, June 5, 1977
- 20 by Kevin Garnett, Minnesota Timberwolves vs. Denver Nuggets on April 21, 2004
- 20 by Kevin Garnett, Minnesota Timberwolves vs. Sacramento Kings on May 19, 2004
- 20 by Tim Duncan, San Antonio Spurs vs. Los Angeles Lakers on May 14, 2002
- 20 by Tim Duncan, San Antonio Spurs vs. Phoenix Suns on April 25, 2003
- 20 by Giannis Antetokounmpo, Milwaukee Bucks at Toronto Raptors on May 19, 2019

==== Assists ====
- Most assists in a game, playoffs

- 24 by Magic Johnson, Los Angeles Lakers vs. Phoenix Suns on May 15, 1984
- 24 by John Stockton, Utah Jazz vs. Los Angeles Lakers on May 17, 1988

- Most assists in a half

- 15 by Magic Johnson, Los Angeles Lakers vs. Portland Trail Blazers on May 3, 1985
- 15 by Doc Rivers, Atlanta Hawks vs. Boston Celtics on May 16, 1988
- 15 by Steve Nash, Phoenix Suns vs. Los Angeles Lakers on April 29, 2007

- Most assists in a quarter

- 11 by John Stockton, Utah Jazz vs. San Antonio Spurs on May 5, 1994

==== Other ====
- Most minutes in a game, playoffs

- 67 by Red Rocha and Paul Seymour, Syracuse Nationals at Boston Celtics on March 21, 1953 (4 OT)

- Most steals in a game, playoffs

- 10 by Allen Iverson, Philadelphia 76ers vs. Orlando Magic on May 13, 1999

- Most steals in a half, playoffs

- 6 by Jarrett Allen, Cleveland Cavaliers vs. Miami Heat on April 28, 2025 (1st)
- 6 by Allen Iverson, Philadelphia 76ers vs. Orlando Magic on May 13, 1999 (1st)
- 6 by Byron Scott, Los Angeles Lakers at Golden State Warriors on May 10, 1991
- 6 by Clyde Drexler, Portland Trail Blazers vs. Phoenix Suns on May 23, 1990
- 6 by Maurice Cheeks, Philadelphia 76ers at San Antonio Spurs on April 22, 1979 (1st)
- 6 by Lionel Hollins, Portland Trail Blazers vs. Los Angeles Lakers on May 8, 1977

- Most steals in a quarter, playoffs

- 5 by Patrick Beverley, Houston Rockets vs. Oklahoma City Thunder on April 23, 2017 (4th)
- 5 by Mike Conley, Memphis Grizzlies vs. San Antonio Spurs on May 25, 2013 (1st)

- Most blocks in a game, playoffs

- 12 by Victor Wembanyama, San Antonio Spurs vs. Minnesota Timberwolves on May 4, 2026

- Most blocks in a half, playoffs

- 8 by Dwight Howard, Orlando Magic vs. Charlotte Hornets on April 18, 2010 (1st)
- 8 by Derrick Coleman, New Jersey Nets vs. Cleveland Cavaliers on May 7, 1993 (2nd)

- Most blocks in a quarter, playoffs

- 6 by Dwight Howard, Orlando Magic vs. Charlotte Hornets on April 18, 2010 (1st)

Most blocks in an overtime period

- 3 by Dwyane Wade, Miami Heat vs. Chicago Bulls on May 24, 2011

- Most turnovers in a game, playoffs

- 12 by James Harden, Houston Rockets vs. Golden State Warriors on May 27, 2015

- Triple-double by teammates in the same game, playoffs

- Stephen Curry (37 points, 11 assists, 13 rebounds) and Draymond Green (18 points, 11 assists, 14 rebounds), Golden State Warriors at Portland Trail Blazers on May 20, 2019
- Nikola Jokić (32 points, 10 assists, 21 rebounds) and Jamal Murray (34 points, 10 assists, 10 rebounds), Denver Nuggets at Miami Heat on June 7, 2023

- Youngest to hit a game-winning buzzer beater, playoffs

- On August 23, 2020, Luka Dončić's performance in game 4 of the Dallas Mavericks playoff series against the Los Angeles Clippers, including 43 points, 17 rebounds, 13 assists

- Longest distance field goal made, playoffs

- 84 feet by Magic Johnson vs. the Denver Nuggets on April 23, 1987

=== Series ===
- Highest points per game average, series

- 46.3 by Jerry West, Los Angeles Lakers (vs. Baltimore Bullets), 1965

- 3-game series

- Most points - 135 by Michael Jordan, Chicago Bulls (vs. Miami Heat), 1992 (45.0 ppg)
- Most minutes played - 144 by Wilt Chamberlain, Philadelphia Warriors (vs. Syracuse Nationals), 1961 (48.0 mpg)
- Most field goals made - 53 by Michael Jordan, Chicago Bulls (vs. Miami Heat), 1992 (53/87, 60.9%)
- Most field goals attempted - 104 by Wilt Chamberlain, Philadelphia Warriors (vs. Syracuse Nationals), 1960
- Most 3-point field goals made - 14 by John Starks, New York Knicks (vs. Cleveland Cavaliers), 1996 (14/22, 63.6%)
- Most 3-point field goals attempted - 35 by Reggie Miller, Indiana Pacers (vs. Milwaukee Bucks), 1999
- Highest 3-point field goal percentage (min. 6 attempts) - 85.7% by Muggsy Bogues, 1997 (6/7)
- Most free throws made - 43 by Kevin Johnson, Phoenix Suns (vs. Denver Nuggets), 1989 (43/46, 93.5%)
- Most free throws attempted - 47 by Dolph Schayes, Syracuse Nationals (vs. Boston Celtics), 1959
- Highest free throw percentage (min. 15 attempts) - 100% by Michael Jordan, Chicago Bulls (vs. Washington Bullets), 1997 (15/15)
- Most rebounds - 84 by Bill Russell, Boston Celtics (vs. Syracuse Nationals), 1957 (28.0 rpg)
- Most offensive rebounds - 28 by Moses Malone, Houston Rockets (vs. Seattle SuperSonics), 1982 (9.3 orpg)
- Most assists - 48 by Magic Johnson, Los Angeles Lakers (vs. San Antonio Spurs), 1986 (16.0 apg)
- Most steals - 13 by Clyde Drexler, Portland Trail Blazers (vs. Dallas Mavericks), 1990; Hersey Hawkins, Philadelphia 76ers (vs. Milwaukee Bucks), 1991 (4.3 spg)
- Most blocks - 18 by Manute Bol, Golden State Warriors (vs. Utah Jazz), 1989 (6.0 bpg)

- 4-game series

- Most points - 150 by Hakeem Olajuwon, Houston Rockets (vs. Dallas Mavericks), 1988 (37.5 ppg)
- Most minutes played - 195 by Wilt Chamberlain, Los Angeles Lakers (vs. Atlanta Hawks), 1970 (48.8 mpg)
- Most field goals made - 65 by Kareem Abdul-Jabbar, Milwaukee Bucks (vs. Chicago Bulls), 1974
- Most field goals attempted - 123 by Tracy McGrady, Orlando Magic (vs. Milwaukee Bucks), 2001
- Most 3-point field goals made - 26 by Stephen Curry, Golden State Warriors (vs. Portland Trail Blazers), 2019
- Most 3-point field goals attempted - 61 by Stephen Curry, Golden State Warriors (vs. Portland Trail Blazers), 2019
- Highest 3-point field goal percentage (min. 8 attempts) - 81.8% by Bob Hansen, Utah Jazz (vs. Portland Trail Blazers), 1988
- Most free throws made - 51 by Kobe Bryant, Los Angeles Lakers (vs. Sacramento Kings), 2001
- Most free throws attempted - 68 by Shaquille O'Neal, Los Angeles Lakers (vs. New Jersey Nets), 2002
- Most rebounds - 118 by Bill Russell, Boston Celtics (vs. Minneapolis Lakers), 1959 (29.5 rpg)
- Most offensive rebounds - 27 by Moses Malone, Philadelphia 76ers (vs. Los Angeles Lakers), 1983
- Most assists - 57 by Magic Johnson, Los Angeles Lakers (vs. Phoenix Suns), 1989 (14.3 apg)
- Most steals - 17 by Lionel Hollins, Portland Trail Blazers (vs. Los Angeles Lakers), 1977 (4.25 spg)
- Most blocks - 23 by Hakeem Olajuwon, Houston Rockets (vs. Los Angeles Lakers), 1990 (5.75 bpg)

- 5-game series

- Most points - 226 by Michael Jordan, Chicago Bulls (vs. Cleveland Cavaliers), 1988 (45.2 ppg)
- Most minutes played - 242 by Kareem Abdul-Jabbar, Los Angeles Lakers (vs. Seattle SuperSonics), 1979 (48.4 mpg)
- Most field goals made - 86 by Michael Jordan, Chicago Bulls (vs. Philadelphia 76ers), 1990
- Most field goals attempted - 162 by Allen Iverson, Philadelphia 76ers (vs. Los Angeles Lakers), 2001
- Most 3-point field goals made - 28 by Klay Thompson Golden State Warriors (vs. Portland Trail Blazers), 2016
- Most 3-point field goals attempted - 56 by Klay Thompson, Golden State Warriors (vs. Portland Trail Blazers), 2016
- Highest 3-point field goal percentage (min. 10 attempts) - 80.0% by Byron Scott, Los Angeles Lakers (vs. Golden State Warriors), 1991
- Most free throws made - 66 by James Harden, Houston Rockets (vs. Oklahoma City Thunder), 2017
- Most free throws attempted - 79 by Karl Malone, Utah Jazz (vs. Los Angeles Clippers), 1992
- Most rebounds - 160 by Wilt Chamberlain, Philadelphia 76ers (vs. Boston Celtics), 1967 (32.0 rpg)
- Most offensive rebounds - 36 by Larry Smith, Golden State Warriors (vs. Los Angeles Lakers), 1987
- Most assists - 85 by Magic Johnson, Los Angeles Lakers (vs. Portland Trail Blazers), 1985 (17.0 apg)
- Most steals - 21 by Micheal Ray Richardson, New Jersey Nets (vs. Philadelphia 76ers), 1984; Baron Davis, Charlotte Hornets (vs. New Jersey Nets), 2002; Baron Davis, Golden State Warriors (vs. Utah Jazz), 2007 (4.2 spg)
- Most blocks - 31 by Dikembe Mutombo, Denver Nuggets (vs. Seattle SuperSonics), 1994 (6.2 bpg)

- 6-game series

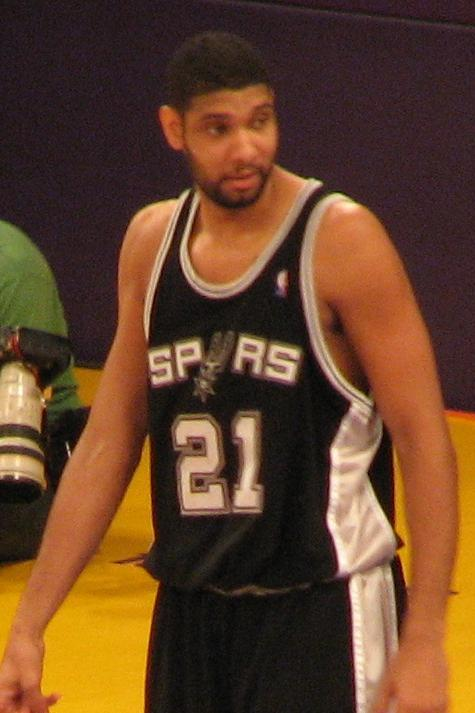
Tim Duncan holds the record for blocks in a 6-game series.

- Most points - 278 by Jerry West, Los Angeles Lakers (vs. Baltimore Bullets), 1965 (46.3 ppg)
- Most minutes played - 296 by Wilt Chamberlain, Philadelphia 76ers (vs. New York Knicks), 1968 (49.3 mpg)
- Most field goals made - 101 by Michael Jordan, Chicago Bulls (vs. Phoenix Suns), 1993
- Most field goals attempted - 235 by Rick Barry, San Francisco Warriors (vs. Philadelphia 76ers), 1967
- Most 3-point field goals made - 35 by Damian Lillard, Portland Trail Blazers (vs. Denver Nuggets), 2021
- Most 3-point field goals attempted - 67 by Stephen Curry, Golden State Warriors (vs. Toronto Raptors), 2019
- Highest 3-point field goal percentage (min. 12 attempts) - 66.7% by Danny Ainge, Phoenix Suns (vs. Chicago Bulls), 1993
- Most free throws made - 86 by Jerry West, Los Angeles Lakers (vs. Baltimore Bullets), 1965
- Most free throws attempted - 97 by Dwyane Wade, Miami Heat (vs. Dallas Mavericks), 2006
- Most rebounds - 171 by Wilt Chamberlain, Philadelphia 76ers (vs. San Francisco Warriors), 1967 (28.5 rpg)
- Most offensive rebounds - 46 by Moses Malone, Houston Rockets (vs. Boston Celtics), 1981
- Most assists - 90 by Johnny Moore, San Antonio Spurs (vs. Los Angeles Lakers), 1983 (15.0 apg)
- Most steals - 19 by Rick Barry, Golden State Warriors (vs. Seattle SuperSonics), 1975 (3.17 spg)
- Most blocks - 32 by Tim Duncan, San Antonio Spurs (vs. New Jersey Nets), 2003 (5.33 bpg)

- 7-game series

- Most points - 284 by Elgin Baylor, Los Angeles Lakers (vs. Boston Celtics), 1962 (40.6 ppg)
- Most minutes played - 345 by Kareem Abdul-Jabbar, Milwaukee Bucks (vs. Boston Celtics), 1974 (49.3 mpg)
- Most field goals made - 113 by Wilt Chamberlain, Philadelphia Warriors (vs. St. Louis Hawks), 1964
- Most field goals attempted - 235 by Elgin Baylor, Los Angeles Lakers (vs. Boston Celtics), 1962
- Most 3-point field goals made - 34 by Stephen Curry, Golden State Warriors (vs. Sacramento Kings), 2023
- Most 3-point field goals attempted - 90 by Stephen Curry, Golden State Warriors (vs. Sacramento Kings), 2023
- Highest 3-point field goal percentage (min. 12 attempts) - 61.1% by Brian Shaw, Los Angeles Lakers (vs. Portland Trail Blazers), 2000 (11/18)
- Most free throws made - 83 by Dolph Schayes, Syracuse Nationals (vs. Boston Celtics), 1959
- Most free throws attempted - 100 by Charles Barkley, Philadelphia 76ers (vs. Milwaukee Bucks), 1986
- Most rebounds - 220 by Wilt Chamberlain, Philadelphia 76ers (vs. Boston Celtics), 1965 (31.4 rpg)
- Most offensive rebounds - 45 by Wes Unseld, Washington Bullets (vs. San Antonio Spurs), 1979; Dikembe Mutombo, Philadelphia 76ers (vs. Milwaukee Bucks), 2001
- Most assists - 115 by John Stockton, Utah Jazz (vs. Los Angeles Lakers), 1988 (16.4 apg)
- Most steals - 28 by John Stockton, Utah Jazz (vs. Los Angeles Lakers), 1988 (4.0 spg)
- Most blocks - 38 by Dikembe Mutombo, Denver Nuggets (vs. Utah Jazz), 1994 (5.43 bpg)

=== Playoff-run ===
Records through the 2025 NBA playoffs.

- Most points

- 759 by Michael Jordan, Chicago Bulls, 1992

- Most personal fouls

- 102 by Dwight Howard, Orlando Magic, 2009

- Most blocks

- 92 by Hakeem Olajuwon, Houston Rockets, 1994

- Most steals

- 66 by Isiah Thomas, Detroit Pistons, 1988

- Highest steals per game average

- 4.11 SPG by Maurice Cheeks in 1979

- Most three-point field goals made

- 98 by Stephen Curry, Golden State Warriors, 2015
- 98 by Klay Thompson, Golden State Warriors, 2016

- Most assists

- 303 by Magic Johnson, Los Angeles Lakers, 1988

- Most rebounds

- 444 by Wilt Chamberlain, Los Angeles Lakers, 1969

=== Career ===
Records through the 2026 NBA playoffs.

- Most games, post-season career

- 302 by LeBron James

- Most minutes, post-season career

- 12,446 by LeBron James

- Most minutes per game, post-season career

- 47.24 by Wilt Chamberlain

==== Points ====
- Most points, post-season career

- 8,521 by LeBron James

- Highest points per game average, post-season career (min. 25 games)

- 33.45 by Michael Jordan (179 games)

- Most 50-point games, post-season career

- 8 by Michael Jordan

- Most 40-point games, post-season career

- 38 by Michael Jordan

- Most 30-point games, post-season career

- 123 by LeBron James

- Most 20-point games, post-season career

- 268 by LeBron James

- Most 10-point games, post-season career

- 300 by LeBron James

- Only player to score 15+ points in every game, post-season career (min. 25 games)

- Michael Jordan (179 games)

- Only player to record consecutive 50-point games, post-season career

- Michael Jordan scored 50 and 55 points in Games 1 and 2 of the 1988 Eastern Conference first round (Chicago Bulls vs. Cleveland Cavaliers).

- Most consecutive 45-point games, post-season career

- 3 by Michael Jordan (May 9–13, 1990)

- Most consecutive 40-point games, post-season career

- 6 by Jerry West (April 3–13, 1965)

- Most consecutive 30-point games, post-season career

- 17 by Rick Barry (April 12, 1967 – April 6, 1971)

- Most consecutive 20-point games, post-season career

- 60 by Michael Jordan (June 2, 1989 – May 11, 1993)

- Most consecutive 15-point games, post-season career

- 179 by Michael Jordan. This streak spans every playoff game of Jordan's career.

- Most consecutive 10-point games, post-season career

- 179 by Michael Jordan. This streak spans every playoff game of Jordan's career.

==== Field goals ====
- Most field goals made, post-season career

- 3,055 by LeBron James

- Most field goals attempted, post-season career

- 6,167 by LeBron James

- Highest field goal percentage, post-season career (min. 200 field goals)

- 66.98% by DeAndre Jordan (213/318)

- Most field goals missed, post-season career

- 3,112 by LeBron James

- Most 2-point field goals made, post-season career

- 2,558 by LeBron James

- Most 2-point field goals attempted, post-season career

- 4,672 by LeBron James

- Highest 2-point field goal percentage, post-season career (min. 200 field goals)

- 67.19% by DeAndre Jordan (213/317)

- Most 3-point field goals made, post-season career

- 650 by Stephen Curry

- Most 3-point field goals attempted, post-season career

- 1,637 by Stephen Curry

- Highest 3-point field goal percentage, post-season career (min. 25 three-pointers)

- 51.59% by Rui Hachimura (81/157)

- Most consecutive games with a 3-point field goal made, post-season career

- 132 by Stephen Curry (12 in 2013; 7 in 2014; 21 in 2015; 18 in 2016; 17 in 2017; 15 in 2018; 22 in 2019; 20 in 2022)

- Highest true shooting percentage, post-season career (takes into consideration points scored from three-pointers, field goals and free throws to get a measure of points scored each shooting attempt; formula is points / (2 * (FG attempts + 0.44 * FT attempts)))

- 63.84% by Rudy Gobert

- Highest effective field goal percentage, post-season career (Similar to FG %, but adds an additional parameter. This parameter adjusts for the fact that 3-point field goals are worth 50 percent more than 2-point field goals. Formula is eFG% = (FGM + (0.5 x 3PTM)) / FGA)

- 66.98% by DeAndre Jordan

- Highest effective field goal percentage, post-season year

- 67.2% by OG Anunoby (min 150 attempts).

==== Free throws ====
- Most free throws made, post-season career

- 1,914 by LeBron James

- Most free throws attempted, post-season career

- 2,582 by LeBron James

- Highest free throw percentage, post-season career (min. 100 attempts)

- 94.96% by Gordon Hayward (113/119)

==== Rebounds ====
- Most rebounds, post-season career

- 4,104 by Bill Russell

- Highest rebounds per game average, post-season career (min. 25 games)

- 24.9 by Bill Russell

- Highest total rebound percentage, post-season career (rebound %, an estimate of the percentage of missed shots a player rebounded while he was on the floor)

- 22.62% by Jonas Valančiūnas

- Most offensive rebounds, post-season career

- 866 by Shaquille O'Neal

- Highest offensive rebound percentage, post-season career

- 15.01% Dennis Rodman

- Most defensive rebounds, post-season career

- 2,249 by LeBron James

- Highest defensive rebound percentage, post-season career

- 32.00% by Jonas Valančiūnas

==== Assists ====
- Most assists, post-season career

- 2,346 by Magic Johnson

- Highest assists per game average, post-season career (min. 25 games)

- 12.35 by Magic Johnson

- Highest assist percentage, post-season career (assist %, an estimate of the percentage of teammate field goals a player assisted while he was on the floor)

- 47.79% John Stockton

==== Steals ====
- Most steals, post-season career

- 506 by LeBron James

- Highest steals per game average, post-season career (min. 25 games)

- 2.28 by Baron Davis (114 steals / 50 games)

- Highest steal percentage, post-season career (steal %, an estimate of the percentage of opponent possessions that end with a steal by the player while he was on the floor)

- 3.76% by Charlie Ward

==== Blocks ====
- Most blocks, post-season career

- 568 by Tim Duncan

- Highest blocks per game average, post-season career (min. 25 games)

- 3.26 by Hakeem Olajuwon (472/145)

- Highest block percentage, post-season career (block %, an estimate of the percentage of opponent two-point field goal attempts blocked by the player while he was on the floor)

- 7.91% by Greg Ostertag

==== Other ====
- Most turnovers, post-season career

- 1,085 by LeBron James

- Most double-doubles, post-season career

- 164 by Tim Duncan

- Most triple-doubles, post-season career

- 30 by Magic Johnson

- Most personal fouls, post-season career

- 797 by Kareem Abdul-Jabbar

- Highest player efficiency rating, post-season career (measuring a player's per-minute performance, while adjusting for pace)

- 28.60 by Michael Jordan

- Highest offensive rating, post-season career (for players it is points produced per 100 possessions)

- 127.59 by Tristan Thompson

- Lowest defensive rating, post-season career (for players and teams it is points allowed per 100 possessions)

- 92.29 by Ben Wallace

== Rookie and age-related records ==
In 2006, the NBA introduced age requirement restrictions. Prospective high school players must wait a year before entering the NBA, making some age-related records harder to break.

- Youngest/oldest player to play a playoff game

- Youngest: Andrew Bynum is the youngest player to play in a playoff game, he logged a total of 1 minute and 52 seconds and missed one shot in the game for the Los Angeles Lakers against the Phoenix Suns at the age of 18 years, 191 days on May 6, 2006.
- Oldest: Robert Parish is the oldest player to play in a playoff game, he logged about 8 minutes, grabbed 2 rebounds and missed all three shots in the game for the Chicago Bulls against the Atlanta Hawks at the age of 43 years, 254 days on May 11, 1997.

- Youngest/oldest player to start in a playoff game

- Youngest: Jonathan Kuminga is the youngest player to start in a playoff game, he logged a total of 17 minutes and 35 seconds, scored 18 points, grabbed 2 rebounds and had 1 assist in the game for the Golden State Warriors against the Memphis Grizzlies at the age of 19 years, 213 days on May 7, 2022.
- Oldest: Kareem Abdul-Jabbar is the oldest player to start in a playoff game, he logged about 29 minutes, scored 7 points, grabbed 3 rebounds and had 3 assists in the game for the Los Angeles Lakers against the Detroit Pistons at the age of 42 years, 58 days on June 13, 1989, game 4 of the 1989 NBA Finals.

- Youngest/oldest player to score in a playoff game

- Youngest: Kobe Bryant is the youngest player to score in a playoff game, he had a total of 2 points for the Los Angeles Lakers against the Portland Trail Blazers at the age of 18 years, 245 days on April 25, 1997.
- Oldest: Robert Parish is the oldest player to score in a playoff game, he had a total of 2 points in the game for the Chicago Bulls against the Atlanta Hawks at the age of 43 years, 251 days on May 8, 1997.

- Youngest/oldest player to score a 3-pointer in a playoff game

- Youngest: Kobe Bryant is the youngest player to hit a 3-pointer in a playoff game, he had a total of 2 3-pointers in the game for the Los Angeles Lakers against the Portland Trail Blazers at the age of 18 years, 250 days on April 30, 1997.
- Oldest: LeBron James is the oldest player to hit a 3-pointer in a playoff game, he had a total of 2 3-pointers in the game for the Los Angeles Lakers against the Oklahoma City Thunder at the age of 41 years, 132 days on May 11, 2026.

- Youngest/oldest player to log a double-double in a playoff game

- Youngest: Carmelo Anthony is the youngest player to log a double-double in a playoff game, he had a total of 24 points and 10 rebounds in the game for the Denver Nuggets against the Minnesota Timberwolves at the age of 19 years, 331 days on April 24, 2004.
- Oldest: Kareem Abdul-Jabbar is the oldest player to log a double-double in a playoff game, he had a total of 24 points and 13 rebounds in the game for the Los Angeles Lakers against the Detroit Pistons at the age of 42 years, 56 days on June 11, 1989, game 3 of the 1989 NBA Finals.

- Youngest/oldest player to log a triple-double in a playoff game

- Youngest: Magic Johnson is the youngest player to log a triple-double in a playoff game, he had a total of 13 points, 12 rebounds and 16 assists in the game for the Los Angeles Lakers against the Phoenix Suns at the age of 20 years, 238 days on April 8, 1980.
- Oldest: John Stockton is the oldest player to log a triple-double in a playoff game, he had a total of 12 points, 11 rebounds and 10 assists in the game for the Utah Jazz against the Dallas Mavericks at the age of 39 years, 33 days on April 28, 2001.

- Youngest player to reach... (playoff career)

- 1,000 points – Kobe Bryant (22 years, 263 days) on May 13, 2001
- 2,000 points – Kobe Bryant (24 years, 257 days) on May 7, 2003
- 3,000 points – LeBron James (27 years, 162 days) on June 3, 2012
- 4,000 oints – LeBron James (29 years, 134 days) on May 6, 2014
- 5,000 points – LeBron James (30 years, 175 days) on June 16, 2015
- 6,000 points – LeBron James (32 years, 161 days) on June 1, 2017
- 7,000 points – LeBron James (35 years, 246 days) on August 24, 2020
- 8,000 points – LeBron James (38 years, 152 days) on May 22, 2023
- 1,000 rebounds – Bill Russell (26 years, 50 days) on April 2, 1960
- 2,000 rebounds – Bill Russell (29 years, 63 days) on April 16, 1963
- 3,000 rebounds – Bill Russell (32 years, 67 days) on April 20, 1966
- 4,000 rebounds – Bill Russell (35 years, 72 days) on April 25, 1969
- 500 assists – Rajon Rondo (24 years, 106 days) on June 8, 2010
- 1,000 assists – Magic Johnson (25 years, 289 days) on May 30, 1985
- 1,500 assists – Magic Johnson (28 years, 259 days) on April 29, 1988
- 2,000 assists – Magic Johnson (30 years, 260 days) on May 1, 1990
- 100 steals – Magic Johnson (23 years, 253 days) on April 24, 1983
- 200 steals – Magic Johnson (25 years, 292 days) on June 2, 1985
- 300 steals – Magic Johnson (29 years, 259 days) on April 30, 1989
- 400 steals – LeBron James (33 years, 122 days) on May 1, 2018
- 500 steals – LeBron James (41 years, 120 days) on April 29, 2026
- 100 blocks – Serge Ibaka (22 years, 254 days) on May 29, 2012
- 200 blocks – Serge Ibaka (26 years, 211 days) on April 16, 2016
- 300 blocks – Tim Duncan (30 years, 3 days) on April 28, 2006
- 400 blocks – Tim Duncan (32 years, 16 days) on May 11, 2008
- 500 blocks – Tim Duncan (37 years, 26 days) on May 21, 2013

== NBA finals records ==
=== Game ===
- Most minutes played in a game, finals

- 62 by Kevin Johnson, Phoenix Suns (at Chicago Bulls) on June 13, 1993 (3 OT)

- Most minutes played in a game without a turnover, finals

- 59 by Dan Majerle, Phoenix Suns (at Chicago Bulls) on June 13, 1993 (3 OT)

==== Points ====
- Most points in a game, finals

- 61 by Elgin Baylor, Los Angeles Lakers (at Boston Celtics) on April 14, 1962

- Most points in a half, finals

- 35 by Michael Jordan, Chicago Bulls (vs. Portland Trail Blazers) on June 3, 1992

- Most points in a quarter, finals

- 25 by Isiah Thomas, Detroit Pistons (at Los Angeles Lakers) on June 19, 1988

- Most points by a duo in a loss, finals

- 77 by LeBron James (39) and Kyrie Irving (38), Cleveland Cavaliers (vs. Golden State Warriors) on June 7, 2017

- Most points by a trio in a loss, finals

- 93 by LeBron James (39), Kyrie Irving (38), and J.R. Smith (16), Cleveland Cavaliers (vs. Golden State Warriors) on June 7, 2017

- Four players score at least 30 points in a game, finals

- Hakeem Olajuwon (34), Sam Cassell (31), Houston Rockets and Shaquille O’Neal (33), Penny Hardaway (32), Orlando Magic on June 9, 1995
- LeBron James (39), Kyrie Irving (38), Cleveland Cavaliers and Kevin Durant (31), Klay Thompson (30), Golden State Warriors on June 7, 2017

- Pair of 30-point scorers on the same team in consecutive games, finals

- Jerry West (40), Elgin Baylor (36), Los Angeles Lakers on April 8, 1962 and Elgin Baylor (39), Jerry West (36), Los Angeles Lakers on April 10, 1962
- Kevin Durant (33), Stephen Curry (32), Golden State Warriors on June 4, 2017 and Kevin Durant (31), Klay Thompson (30), Golden State Warriors on June 7, 2017
- LeBron James (39), Kyrie Irving (38), Cleveland Cavaliers on June 7, 2017 and Kyrie Irving (40), LeBron James (31), Cleveland Cavaliers on June 9, 2017

- 40-point scoring duos, finals

- 41 by LeBron James and Kyrie Irving, Cleveland Cavaliers (at Golden State Warriors) on June 13, 2016

- Most points combined, finals

- 276 by the Philadelphia 76ers (141) and San Francisco Warriors (135) on April 14, 1967

==== Field goals ====
- Most field goals made in a game, finals

- 22 by Elgin Baylor, Los Angeles Lakers (at Boston Celtics) on April 14, 1962
- 22 by Rick Barry, San Francisco Warriors (vs. Philadelphia 76ers) on April 18, 1967

- Most field goals attempted in a game, finals

- 48 by Rick Barry, San Francisco Warriors (vs. Philadelphia 76ers) on April 18, 1967

- Most field goals attempted in a game, none made, finals

- 14 by Dennis Johnson, Seattle SuperSonics (vs. Washington Bullets) on June 7, 1978

- Most field goals made in a half, finals

- 14 by Isiah Thomas, Detroit Pistons (at Los Angeles Lakers) on June 19, 1988
- 14 by Michael Jordan, Chicago Bulls (vs. Portland Trail Blazers) on June 3, 1992
- 14 by Michael Jordan, Chicago Bulls (vs. Phoenix Suns) on June 16, 1993

- Most field goals attempted in a half, finals

- 25 by Elgin Baylor, Los Angeles Lakers (at Boston Celtics) on April 14, 1962

- Most field goals made in a quarter, finals

- 11 by Isiah Thomas, Detroit Pistons (at Los Angeles Lakers) on June 19, 1988

- Most field goals attempted in a quarter, finals

- 17 by Rick Barry, San Francisco Warriors (vs. Philadelphia 76ers) on April 14, 1967

- Most consecutive field goals made, finals

- 13 by Michael Jordan, Chicago Bulls (vs. Los Angeles Lakers) on June 5, 1991

- Most 3-point field goals made in a game, finals

- 9 by Stephen Curry, Golden State Warriors (vs. Cleveland Cavaliers) on June 3, 2018

- Most 3-point field goals attempted in a game, finals

- 17 by Stephen Curry, Golden State Warriors (vs. Cleveland Cavaliers) on June 3, 2018

- Most 3-point field goals made in a half, finals

- 7 by Ray Allen, Boston Celtics (vs. Los Angeles Lakers) on June 6, 2010

- Most 3-point field goals attempted in a half, finals

- 10 by John Starks, New York Knicks (vs. Houston Rockets) on June 22, 1994

- Most 3-point field goals made in a quarter, finals

- 6 by Stephen Curry, Golden State Warriors (vs. Boston Celtics) on June 2, 2022

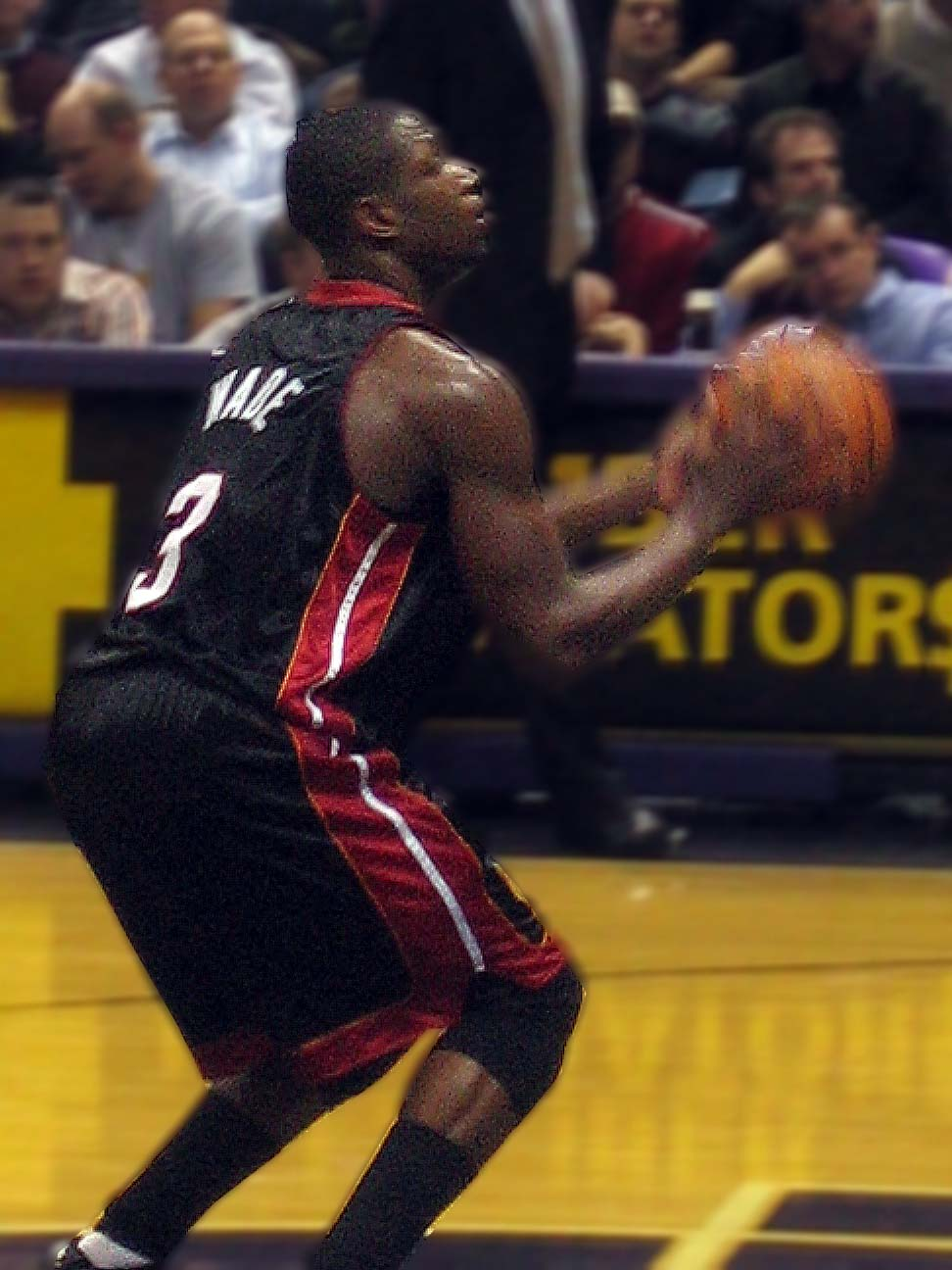
Dwyane Wade holds the finals record for free throws made in a game with 21.

- Most 4-point plays made in a game, finals

- 2 by Ray Allen, Miami Heat (vs. San Antonio Spurs) on June 16, 2013

==== Free throws ====
- Most free throws made in a game, finals

- 21 by Dwyane Wade, Miami (vs. Dallas Mavericks) on June 18, 2006 (OT)

- Most free throws made in a game, no misses, finals

- 16 by Kawhi Leonard, Toronto Raptors (vs. Golden State Warriors) on June 2, 2019

- Most free throws attempted in a game, finals

- 39 by Shaquille O'Neal, Los Angeles Lakers (vs. Indiana Pacers) on June 9, 2000 (18/39)

- Most free throws made in a half, finals

- 13 by Shaquille O'Neal, Los Angeles Lakers (vs. Indiana Pacers) on June 9, 2000

- Most free throws attempted in a half, finals

- 22 by Shaquille O'Neal, Los Angeles Lakers (vs. Indiana Pacers) on June 9, 2000

- Most free throws made in a quarter, finals

- 10 by Stephen Curry, Golden State Warriors (vs. Cleveland Cavaliers) on June 4, 2017
- 10 by Paul Pierce, Boston Celtics (vs. Los Angeles Lakers) on June 15, 2008

- Most free throws attempted in a quarter, finals

- 16 by Shaquille O'Neal, Los Angeles Lakers (vs. Indiana Pacers) on June 9, 2000
- 16 by Shaquille O'Neal, Los Angeles Lakers (vs. New Jersey Nets) on June 5, 2002

==== Rebounds ====
- Most rebounds in a game, finals

- 40 by Bill Russell, Boston Celtics (vs. St. Louis Hawks) on March 29, 1960
- 40 by Bill Russell, Boston Celtics (vs. Los Angeles Lakers) on April 18, 1962 (OT)

- Most rebounds in a half, finals

- 26 by Wilt Chamberlain, Philadelphia 76ers (vs. San Francisco Warriors) on April 16, 1967

- Most rebounds in a quarter, finals

- 19 by Bill Russell, Boston Celtics (vs. Los Angeles Lakers) on April 18, 1962

- Most offensive rebounds in a game, finals

- 11 by Elvin Hayes, Washington Bullets (vs. Seattle SuperSonics) on May 27, 1979
- 11 by Dennis Rodman, Chicago Bulls (vs. Seattle SuperSonics) on June 7, 1996
- 11 by Dennis Rodman, Chicago Bulls (vs. Seattle SuperSonics) on June 16, 1996

- Most defensive rebounds in a game, finals

- 20 by Bill Walton, Portland Trail Blazers at Philadelphia 76ers, June 3, 1977
- 20 by Bill Walton, Portland Trail Blazers vs. Philadelphia 76ers, June 5, 1977

==== Assists ====
- Most assists in a game, finals

- 21 by Magic Johnson, Los Angeles Lakers (vs. Boston Celtics) on June 3, 1984

- Most assists in a half, finals

- 14 by Magic Johnson, Los Angeles Lakers (vs. Detroit Pistons) on June 19, 1988

- Most assists in a quarter, finals

- 8 by Bob Cousy, Boston Celtics (vs. St. Louis Hawks) on April 9, 1957
- 8 by Magic Johnson, Los Angeles Lakers (vs. Boston Celtics) on June 3, 1984
- 8 by Robert Reid, Houston Rockets (vs. Boston Celtics) on June 5, 1986
- 8 by Michael Cooper and Magic Johnson, Los Angeles Lakers (vs. Boston Celtics) on June 4, 1987
- 8 by Magic Johnson, Los Angeles Lakers (at Detroit Pistons) on June 16, 1988
- 8 by Magic Johnson, Los Angeles Lakers (vs. Detroit Pistons) on June 19, 1988
- 8 by John Stockton, Utah Jazz (at Chicago Bulls) on June 10, 1998

- Most assists in a game without a turnover, finals

- 17 by Robert Reid, Houston Rockets (vs. Boston Celtics) on June 5, 1986

==== Other ====
- Most steals in a game, finals

- 7 by Robert Horry, Houston Rockets (at Orlando Magic) on June 9, 1995

- Most steals in a half, finals

- 5 by Draymond Green, Golden State Warriors (vs. Cleveland Cavaliers) on June 7, 2015 (2nd)
- 5 by Tyronn Lue, Los Angeles Lakers (vs. Philadelphia 76ers) on June 6, 2001 (2nd)

- Most steals in a quarter, finals

- 4 by Pascal Siakam, Indiana Pacers (vs. Oklahoma City Thunder) on June 13, 2025 (1st)
- 4 by LeBron James, Miami Heat (vs. San Antonio Spurs) on June 10, 2014 (4th)
- 4 by Kobe Bryant, Los Angeles Lakers (vs. Boston Celtics) on June 6, 2010 (2nd)
- 4 by Rajon Rondo, Boston Celtics (vs. Los Angeles Lakers) on June 17, 2008 (1st)

- Most steals in a overtime period, finals

- 2 by Iman Shumpert, Cleveland Cavaliers (at Golden State Warriors) on June 7, 2015
- 2 by Derek Fisher, Los Angeles Lakers (vs. Orlando Magic) on June 7, 2009

- Most blocks in a game, finals

- 9 by Dwight Howard, Orlando Magic (vs. Los Angeles Lakers) on June 11, 2009

- Most blocks in a half, finals

- 5 by Victor Wembanyama, San Antonio Spurs (vs. New York Knicks) on June 13, 2026 (1st)
- 5 by Serge Ibaka, Toronto Raptors (at Golden State Warriors) on June 5, 2019 (2nd)
- 5 by Dwight Howard, Orlando Magic (vs. Los Angeles Lakers) on June 11, 2009 (1st)
- 5 by Ben Wallace, Detroit Pistons (vs. San Antonio Spurs) on June 14, 2005 (1st)
- 5 by Tin Duncan, San Antonio Spurs (vs. New Jersey Nets) on June 15, 2003 (1st)
- 5 by Shaquille O'Neal, Los Angeles Lakers (vs. Philadelphia 76ers) on June 8, 2001 (2nd)
- 5 by Dennis Johnson, Seattle SuperSonics (vs. Washington Bullets) on May 28, 1978

- Most blocks in a quarter, finals

- 5 by Ben Wallace, Detroit Pistons (vs. San Antonio Spurs) on June 14, 2005 (1st)
- 5 by Shaquille O'Neal, Los Angeles Lakers (vs. Philadelphia 76ers) on June 8, 2001 (3rd)

- Most blocks in a overtime period, finals

- 2 by Draymond Green, Golden State Warriors (vs. Cleveland Cavaliers) on June 7, 2015
- 2 by Chris Bosh, Miami Heat (vs. San Antonio Spurs) on June 18, 2013

- Most turnovers in a game, finals

- 10 by Magic Johnson, Los Angeles Lakers (vs. Philadelphia 76ers) on May 14, 1980

- Triple-double by opposing players in the same game, finals

- Stephen Curry (32 points, 11 assists, 10 rebounds) and LeBron James (29 points, 14 assists, 11 rebounds), Cleveland Cavaliers at Golden State Warriors on June 4, 2017

- Triple-double by teammates in the same game, finals

- Nikola Jokić (32 points, 10 assists, 21 rebounds) and Jamal Murray (34 points, 10 assists, 10 rebounds), Denver Nuggets at Miami Heat on June 7, 2023

=== Series ===
- Most points per game in an NBA Championship series

- 41.0 by Michael Jordan, Chicago Bulls (vs. Phoenix Suns), 1993

- Triple-double per game average in the NBA Finals

- LeBron James: 33.6 points, 12.0 rebounds, and 10.0 assists, Cleveland Cavaliers (vs. Golden State Warriors), 2017

- Only players to score at least 30 points in every game, finals

- Elgin Baylor, Los Angeles Lakers (vs. Boston Celtics), 1962 (7 games)
- Rick Barry, San Francisco Warriors (vs. Philadelphia 76ers), 1967 (6 games)
- Michael Jordan, Chicago Bulls (vs. Phoenix Suns), 1993 (6 games)
- Hakeem Olajuwon, Houston Rockets (vs. Orlando Magic), 1995 (4 games)
- Shaquille O'Neal, Los Angeles Lakers (vs. Indiana Pacers), 2000 (6 games)
- Shaquille O'Neal, Los Angeles Lakers (vs. New Jersey Nets), 2002 (4 games)
- Kevin Durant, Golden State Warriors (vs. Cleveland Cavaliers), 2017 (5 games)

- 4-game series, finals

- Most points - 145 by Shaquille O'Neal, Los Angeles Lakers (vs. New Jersey Nets), 2002 (36.3 ppg)
- Most field goals made - 56 by Hakeem Olajuwon, Houston Rockets (vs. Orlando Magic), 1995
- Most field goals attempted - 116 by Hakeem Olajuwon, Houston Rockets (vs. Orlando Magic), 1995
- Most 3-point field goals made - 22 by Stephen Curry, Golden State Warriors (vs. Cleveland Cavaliers), 2018
- Most 3-point field goals attempted - 53 by Stephen Curry, Golden State Warriors (vs. Cleveland Cavaliers), 2018
- Highest 3-point field goal percentage - 66.7% by Derek Fisher, Los Angeles Lakers (vs. New Jersey Nets), 2002
- Most rebounds - 118 by Bill Russell, Boston Celtics (vs. Minneapolis Lakers), 1959 (29.5 rpg)
- Most offensive rebounds - 27 by Moses Malone, Philadelphia 76ers (vs. Los Angeles Lakers), 1983
- Most assists - 51 by Bob Cousy, Boston Celtics (vs. Minneapolis Lakers), 1959 (12.8 apg)
- Most steals - 14 by Rick Barry, Golden State Warriors (vs. Washington Bullets), 1975 (3.5 spg)

- 5-game series, finals

- Most points - 178 by Allen Iverson, Philadelphia 76ers (vs. Los Angeles Lakers), 2001 (35.6 ppg)
- Most field goals made - 66 by Allen Iverson, Philadelphia 76ers (vs. Los Angeles Lakers), 2001, and LeBron James, Cleveland Cavaliers (vs. Golden State Warriors), 2017
- Most field goals attempted - 162 by Allen Iverson, Philadelphia 76ers (vs. Los Angeles Lakers), 2001
- Most 3-point field goals made - 24 by Klay Thompson, Golden State Warriors (vs. Toronto Raptors), 2019
- Most 3-point field goals attempted - 49 by Stephen Curry, Golden State Warriors (vs. Cleveland Cavaliers), 2017
- Highest 3-point field goal percentage - 68.8% by Isiah Thomas, Detroit Pistons (vs. Portland Trail Blazers), 1990
- Highest free throw percentage - 100% by Bill Laimbeer, Detroit Pistons (vs. Portland Trail Blazers), 1990, Vlade Divac, Los Angeles Lakers (vs. Chicago Bulls), 1991, and Karl-Anthony Towns, New York Knicks (vs. San Antonio Spurs), 2026
- Most rebounds - 144 by Bill Russell, Boston Celtics (vs. St. Louis Hawks), 1961 (28.8 rpg)
- Most offensive rebounds - 31 by Shaquille O'Neal, Los Angeles Lakers (vs. Philadelphia 76ers), 2001
- Most assists - 62 by Magic Johnson, Los Angeles Lakers (vs. Chicago Bulls), 1991 (12.4 apg)
- Most steals - 14 by Michael Jordan, Chicago Bulls (vs. Los Angeles Lakers), 1991 (2.8 spg)
- Most blocks - 20 by Dwight Howard, Orlando Magic (vs. Los Angeles Lakers), 2009 (4 bpg)

- 6-game series, finals

- Most points - 246 by Michael Jordan, Chicago Bulls (vs. Phoenix Suns), 1993 (41.0 ppg)
- Most field goals made - 101 by Michael Jordan, Chicago Bulls (vs. Phoenix Suns), 1993
- Most field goals attempted - 235 by Rick Barry, San Francisco Warriors (vs. Philadelphia 76ers), 1967
- Most 3-point field goals made - 31 by Stephen Curry, Golden State Warriors (vs. Boston Celtics), 2022
- Most 3-point field goals attempted - 71 by Stephen Curry, Golden State Warriors (vs. Boston Celtics), 2022
- Highest 3-point field goal percentage - 66.7% by Danny Ainge, Phoenix Suns (vs. Chicago Bulls), 1993
- Highest free throw percentage - 97.8% by Reggie Miller, Indiana Pacers (vs. Los Angeles Lakers), 2000; Dirk Nowitzki, Dallas Mavericks (vs. Miami Heat), 2011
- Most rebounds - 171 by Wilt Chamberlain, Philadelphia 76ers (vs. San Francisco Warriors), 1967 (28.5 rpg)
- Most offensive rebounds - 46 by Moses Malone, Houston Rockets (vs. Boston Celtics), 1981
- Most assists - 84 by Magic Johnson, Los Angeles Lakers (vs. Boston Celtics), 1985 (14.0 apg)
- Most steals - 16 by Julius Erving, Philadelphia 76ers (vs. Portland Trail Blazers), 1977; Magic Johnson, Los Angeles Lakers (vs. Philadelphia 76ers), 1980; Larry Bird, Boston Celtics (vs. Houston Rockets), 1986; and Dwyane Wade, Miami Heat (vs. Dallas Mavericks), 2006 (2.67 spg)
- Most blocks - 32 by Tim Duncan, San Antonio Spurs (vs. New Jersey Nets), 2003 (5.33 bpg)

- 7-game series, finals

- Most points - 284 by Elgin Baylor, Los Angeles Lakers (vs. Boston Celtics), 1962 (40.6 ppg)
- Most field goals made - 101 by Elgin Baylor, Los Angeles Lakers (vs. Boston Celtics), 1962
- Most field goals attempted - 235 by Elgin Baylor, Los Angeles Lakers (vs. Boston Celtics), 1962
- Most 3-point field goals made- 32 by Stephen Curry, Golden State Warriors (vs. Cleveland Cavaliers), 2016
- Most 3-point field goals attempted - 80 by Stephen Curry, Golden State Warriors (vs. Cleveland Cavaliers), 2016
- Highest 3-point field goal percentage - 55% by Danny Green, San Antonio Spurs (vs. Miami Heat), 2013
- Highest free throw percentage - 95.9% by Bill Sharman, Boston Celtics (vs. St. Louis Hawks), 1957 (30/31)
- Most rebounds - 189 by Bill Russell, Boston Celtics (vs. Los Angeles Lakers), 1962 (27.0 rpg)
- Most assists - 95 by Magic Johnson, Los Angeles Lakers (vs. Boston Celtics), 1984 (13.6 apg)
- Most steals - 20 by Isiah Thomas, Detroit Pistons (vs. Los Angeles Lakers), 1988 (2.86 spg)
- Most blocks - 30 by Patrick Ewing, New York Knicks (vs. Houston Rockets), 1994 (4.29 bpg)

=== Career ===
- Most points, finals

- 1,679 by Jerry West

- Highest points per game average, finals (min. 10 games)

- 36.3 by Rick Barry (10 games)

- Most field goals made, finals

- 612 by Jerry West

- Most field goals attempted, finals

- 1,333 by Jerry West (45.91%)

- Most 3-point field goals made, finals

- 152 by Stephen Curry

- Most 3-point field goals attempted, finals

- 365 by Stephen Curry

- Highest 3-point field goal percentage, finals (min. 40 attempts)

- 56.1% by Al Horford (23/41)

- Most free throws made, finals

- 455 by Jerry West

- Most free throws attempted, finals

- 551 by Jerry West (82.58%)

- Highest free throw percentage, finals (min. 100 attempts)

- 93.1% by Dirk Nowitzki (94/101)

- Most 40 point games, finals

- 10 by Jerry West

- Most 30 point games, finals

- 31 by Jerry West

- Most 20 point games, finals

- 49 by Jerry West

- Most consecutive 40 point games, finals

- 4 by Michael Jordan (June 11–18, 1993)

- Most consecutive 30 point games, finals

- 13 by Elgin Baylor (April 9, 1959 – April 21, 1963)

- Most consecutive 20 point games, finals

- 35 by Michael Jordan (June 2, 1991 – June 14, 1998). This streak entails every Finals game of Jordan's career.

- Only player to score 20+ points in all games, finals (min. 15 games)

- Michael Jordan (35 games)

- Most rebounds, finals

- 1,718 by Bill Russell

- Highest rebounds per game average, finals (min. 10 games)

- 24.6 by Wilt Chamberlain (35 games)

- Most offensive rebounds, finals

- 125 by Tim Duncan

- Most defensive rebounds, finals

- 454 by LeBron James

- Most assists, finals

- 584 by Magic Johnson

- Highest assists per game average, finals (min. 10 games)

- 11.7 by Magic Johnson (50 games)

- Most steals, finals

- 102 by Magic Johnson

- Most blocks, finals

- 116 by Kareem Abdul-Jabbar

- Most turnovers, finals

- 217 by LeBron James

- Most games played, finals

- 70 by Bill Russell

- Most personal fouls, finals

- 225 by Bill Russell

- Most triple-doubles, finals

- 11 by LeBron James

== Franchise ==
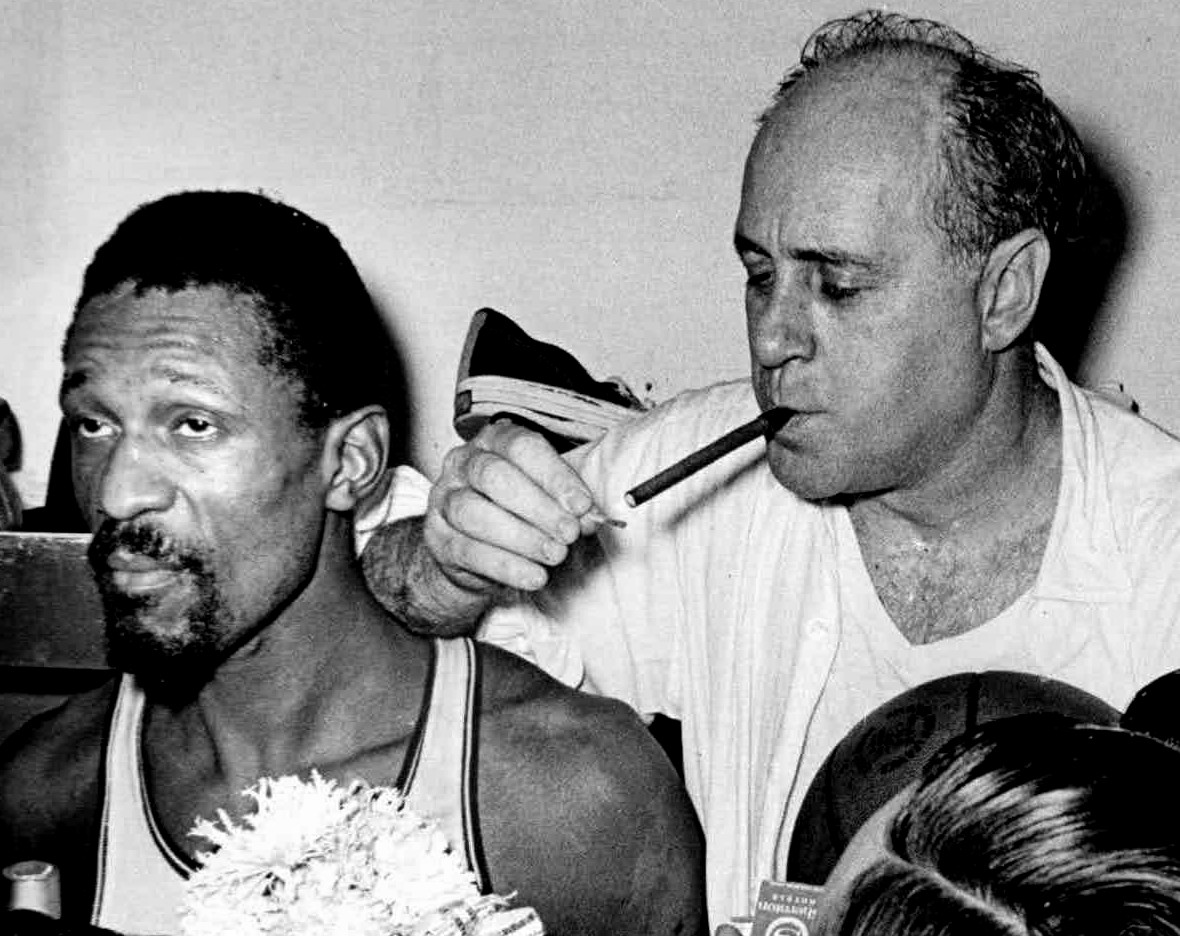
Bill Russell and Red Auerbach were key figures in the Boston Celtics' eight straight NBA titles and 10 straight NBA finals appearances in the 1950s and 1960s.

- Most titles won

- 18 by the Boston Celtics

- Most finals appearances

- 32 by the Los Angeles Lakers

- Most Consecutive NBA titles

- 8 by the Boston Celtics (1959–66)

- Most consecutive NBA finals appearances

- 10 by the Boston Celtics (1957–66)

- Best NBA finals series record

- 6–0 by the Chicago Bulls

- Most NBA finals appearances without a title

- 3 by the Phoenix Suns (1976, 1993, 2021)

- Most playoff appearances without a finals appearance

- 19 by the Los Angeles Clippers

- Most playoff appearances without a title

- 34 by the Phoenix Suns

- Most playoff appearances without a conference finals appearance

- 10 by the Charlotte Hornets

- Most consecutive playoff appearances overall

- 22 by the Syracuse Nationals/Philadelphia 76ers (1950–71)
- 22 by the San Antonio Spurs (1998–2019)

- Most consecutive Playoff appearances in one city

- 22 by the San Antonio Spurs (1998–2019)

- Longest active streak of playoff appearances

- 12 by the Boston Celtics (2015–present)

- Fewest playoff appearances

- 9 by the New Orleans Pelicans

- Most seasons without a playoff appearance

- 42 by the Golden State Warriors

- Most consecutive seasons without a playoff appearance

- 16 by the Sacramento Kings (2007–22)

- Fewest seasons without a playoff appearance

- 10 by the San Antonio Spurs (Joined NBA in 1976)

- Highest playoff winning percentage

- 0.941 by the Golden State Warriors (16–1) in 2017

- Undefeated in playoffs at home

- 9–0 by the Golden State Warriors in 2017

=== Playoffs ===
- Most 3-point field goals made in a game, playoffs

- 25 by the Cleveland Cavaliers vs. Atlanta Hawks, Game 2, on May 4, 2016
- 25 by the Milwaukee Bucks vs. Miami Heat, Game 2, on April 19, 2023
- 25 by the New York Knicks vs. Philadelphia 76ers, Game 4, on May 10, 2026

- Most 3-point field goals made in a half, playoffs

- 18 by the New York Knicks vs. Philadelphia 76ers, Game 4 in the first half, on May 10, 2026
- 18 by the Cleveland Cavaliers vs. Atlanta Hawks, Game 2 in the first half, on May 4, 2016

- Most 3-point field goals made in a quarter, playoffs

- 11 by the New York Knicks vs. Philadelphia 76ers, Game 4 in the first quarter, on May 10, 2026
- 11 by the Cleveland Cavaliers vs. Miami Heat, Game 2 in the second quarter, on April 23, 2025

- Largest margin of points in a half, playoffs

- 47 by the New York Knicks vs. Atlanta Hawks on April 30, 2026

- Largest margin of victory in a game, playoffs

- 58 by the Minneapolis Lakers vs. St. Louis Hawks on March 19, 1956
- 58 by the Denver Nuggets vs. New Orleans Hornets on April 27, 2009

- Largest point differential in a single postseason

- +283 by the New York Knicks in 2026

- Highest field goal percentage in a game, playoffs

- 67.1% by the Indiana Pacers vs. New York Knicks on May 19, 2024

- Most consecutive wins, playoffs

- 15 by the Golden State Warriors from April 16, 2017 to June 9, 2017.

- Largest average point differential, playoffs

- +14.9 PPG by the New York Knicks in 2026

- Most double-digit wins in a single postseason

- 12 each, by the Miami Heat in 2013;
- by the San Antonio Spurs in 2014;
- by the Cleveland Cavaliers in 2016;
- by the Golden State Warriors in 2017;
- by the New York Knicks in 2026.

- Most consecutive road wins in postseason

- 9 by the New York Knicks in 2026

- Most points in a game, playoffs

- 157 by the Boston Celtics (vs. New York Knicks) on April 28, 1990

- Most points in a half, playoffs

- 87 by the Milwaukee Bucks (vs. Denver Nuggets) on April 23, 1978
- 87 by the Oklahoma City Thunder (vs. Denver Nuggets) on May 7, 2025

- Most points in a quarter, playoffs

- 51 by the Los Angeles Lakers (vs. Detroit Pistons) on March 31, 1962
- 51 by the Philadelphia 76ers (vs. Brooklyn Nets) on April 15, 2019

- Most points in an overtime period, playoffs

- 22 by the Los Angeles Lakers (vs. New York Knicks) on May 1, 1970

- Most points off bench, playoffs

- 100 by the Toronto Raptors (vs. Brooklyn Nets) on August 23, 2020

- Fewest points in a game, playoffs

- 54 by the Utah Jazz (vs. Chicago Bulls) on June 7, 1998

- Fewest points in a half, playoffs

- 19 by the Orlando Magic (vs. Detroit Pistons) on May 1, 2026

- Fewest points in a quarter, playoffs

- 5 by the Portland Trail Blazers (vs. Utah Jazz) on May 18, 1999

- Fewest points in an overtime period, playoffs

- 0 by the Minneapolis Lakers (vs. Fort Wayne Pistons) on March 22, 1955
- 0 by the Boston Celtics (vs. Indiana Pacers) on April 29, 2003

- Largest comeback

- 31 points by the Los Angeles Clippers, overcoming a 94–63 deficit in the 3rd quarter to beat the Golden State Warriors on the road on April 15, 2019

=== NBA finals ===
- Most 3-point field goals made in a game, finals

- 24 by the Cleveland Cavaliers (vs. Golden State Warriors) Game 4 on June 9, 2017

- Most 3-point field goals made in a half, finals

- 13 by the Cleveland Cavaliers (vs. Golden State Warriors) Game 4 on June 9, 2017 (1st Half)

- Most 3-point field goals made in a quarter, finals

- 9 by the Golden State Warriors (vs. Cleveland Cavaliers) Game 3 on June 7, 2017 (1st)
- 9 by the Boston Celtics (vs. Golden State Warriors) Game 1 on June 2, 2022 (4th)

- Largest margin of victory in a game, finals

- 42 by the Chicago Bulls (vs. Utah Jazz) on June 7, 1998

- Largest average point differential, finals series

- +15.0 PPG by the Golden State Warriors in 2018

- Highest field goal percentage in a half, finals

- 75.8% by the San Antonio Spurs (vs. Miami Heat) Game 3 on June 10, 2014 (1st half)

- Highest field goal percentage in a game, finals

- 63% by the Orlando Magic (vs. Los Angeles Lakers) Game 3 on June 9, 2009

- Only team to win series after facing a 3–1 series deficit, finals

- Cleveland Cavaliers, 2016 NBA Finals

- Fewest turnovers in a game, finals

- 4 by the Detroit Pistons (vs. San Antonio Spurs) on June 16, 2005
- 4 by the San Antonio Spurs (vs. Miami Heat) on June 6, 2013
- 4 by the Golden State Warriors (vs. Cleveland Cavaliers) on June 1, 2017

- Largest turnover differential in a game, finals

- -16 by the Golden State Warriors (vs. Cleveland Cavaliers) on June 1, 2017

- Most points in a game, finals

- 148 by the Boston Celtics (vs. Los Angeles Lakers) on May 27, 1985

- Most points in a half, finals

- 86 by the Cleveland Cavaliers (vs. Golden State Warriors) on June 9, 2017 (1st Half)

- Most points in a quarter, finals

- 49 by the Cleveland Cavaliers (vs. Golden State Warriors) on June 9, 2017 (1st)

- Fewest points in a game, finals

- 54 by the Utah Jazz (vs. Chicago Bulls) on June 7, 1998

- Fewest points in a half, finals

- 23 by the Utah Jazz (vs. Chicago Bulls) on June 7, 1998 (2nd Half)

- Fewest points in a quarter, finals

- 7 by the Dallas Mavericks (vs. Miami Heat) on June 15, 2006 (4th)

- Only team to win Finals game by double digits after trailing by double digits entering the 4th quarter

- the Boston Celtics vs. the Golden State Warriors on June 3, 2022 (Game 1)

- Largest comeback, finals

- 29 points by the New York Knicks, overcoming a 81–52 deficit in the 3rd quarter to beat the San Antonio Spurs at home on June 10, 2026

== Other records ==
- Most Wins in a Season, Including Post-Season, Team
  - 88 Wins by 2015- 2016 Golden State Warriors, 88-18 total, 73–9 regular season, 15–9 playoffs
- Most Wins in a Season, Including Post-Season, NBA Champion Team
  - 87 Wins by 1995-1996 Chicago Bulls, 87–13 total, 72–10 regular season, 15–3 playoffs
- Best Win percentage in a season, Including Post Season, Team
  - 87.0% (.870) by 1995-1996 Chicago Bulls , 87–13 total, 72–10 regular season, 15–3 playoffs
- Best Win percentage in a season, including Post Season, NBA Champion Team
  - 87.0% (.870) by 1995-1996 Chicago Bulls , 87–13 total, 72–10 regular season, 15–3 playoffs
- Best Win percentage, Playoffs, by a team that were not NBA Champions
  - 71.4% (.714) by 2008-2009 Cleveland Cavaliers, 10-4 playoffs
- Most NBA titles won by a player

- 11 by Bill Russell

- Most NBA titles won by a coach

- 11 by Phil Jackson

- Most consecutive NBA finals appearances by a player

- 10 by Bill Russell (1957–66)

- Best record for NBA finals series outcomes

- 8–0 by K.C. Jones, Satch Sanders, and John Havlicek

- Only players to win an Olympic gold medal, NCAA title, and NBA title

- Clyde Lovellette — Olympics, 1952; NCAA, 1952; NBA, 1954, 1963–64
- Bill Russell — Olympics, 1956; NCAA, 1955–56; NBA, 1957, 1959–66, 1968–69
- K.C. Jones — Olympics, 1956; NCAA, 1955–56; NBA, 1959–66
- Jerry Lucas — Olympics, 1960; NCAA, 1960; NBA, 1973
- Quinn Buckner — Olympics, 1976; NCAA, 1976; NBA, 1984
- Michael Jordan — Olympics, 1984, 1992; NCAA, 1982; NBA, 1991–93, 1996–98
- Magic Johnson — Olympics, 1992; NCAA, 1979; NBA, 1980, 1982, 1985, 1987–88
- Anthony Davis — Olympics, 2012; NCAA, 2012; NBA, 2020

- Only players to win an Olympic gold medal, EuroLeague/European Champions Cup, and NBA title

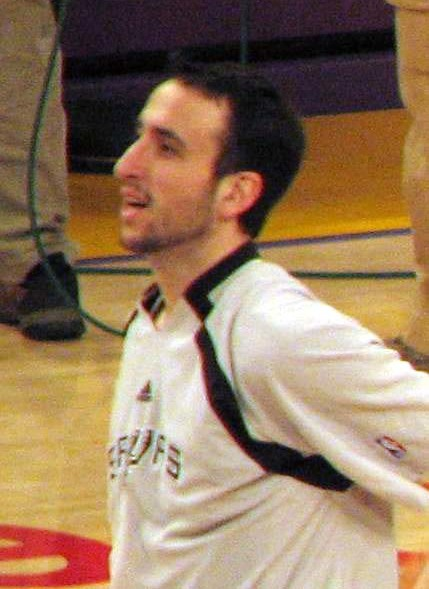
Manu Ginóbili and Bill Bradley are the only players to win an Olympic gold medal, EuroLeague/European Champions Cup, and NBA title.

- Bill Bradley — Olympics, 1964; European Champions Cup, 1966; NBA, 1970, 1973
- Manu Ginóbili — Olympics, 2004; Euroleague, 2001; NBA, 2003, 2005, 2007, 2014

- Only 8th seeded teams to advance in Playoffs

- 5-game format

- The Denver Nuggets eliminated the Seattle SuperSonics 3–2 in the first round in the 1994 NBA Playoffs.
- The New York Knicks eliminated the Miami Heat 3–2 in the first round in the 1999 NBA Playoffs (lockout shortened season). In addition, New York became the first 8th seed to reach the NBA Finals, but lost in 5 to the San Antonio Spurs.

- 7-game format

- The Golden State Warriors eliminated the Dallas Mavericks 4–2 in the first round in the 2007 NBA Playoffs.
- The Memphis Grizzlies eliminated the San Antonio Spurs 4–2 in the first round in the 2011 NBA Playoffs.
- The Philadelphia 76ers eliminated the Chicago Bulls 4–2 in the first round in the 2012 NBA Playoffs (lockout shortened season).
- The Miami Heat eliminated the Milwaukee Bucks 4–1 in the first round in the 2023 NBA playoffs.

== Awards ==
- Most Bill Russell NBA Finals Most Valuable Player Awards*

- 6 by Michael Jordan

- Most Bill Russell NBA Finals Most Valuable Player Awards wins in a row*

- 3 by Michael Jordan (twice) and Shaquille O'Neal

* This award has only been given since the 1968–69 season.

== See also ==
- List of NBA players with most championships
- List of NBA single-game playoff scoring leaders
- List of NBA franchise post-season droughts
- List of NBA franchise post-season streaks
- List of NBA regular season records
- List of NBA All-Star Game records
