= List of career achievements by LeBron James =

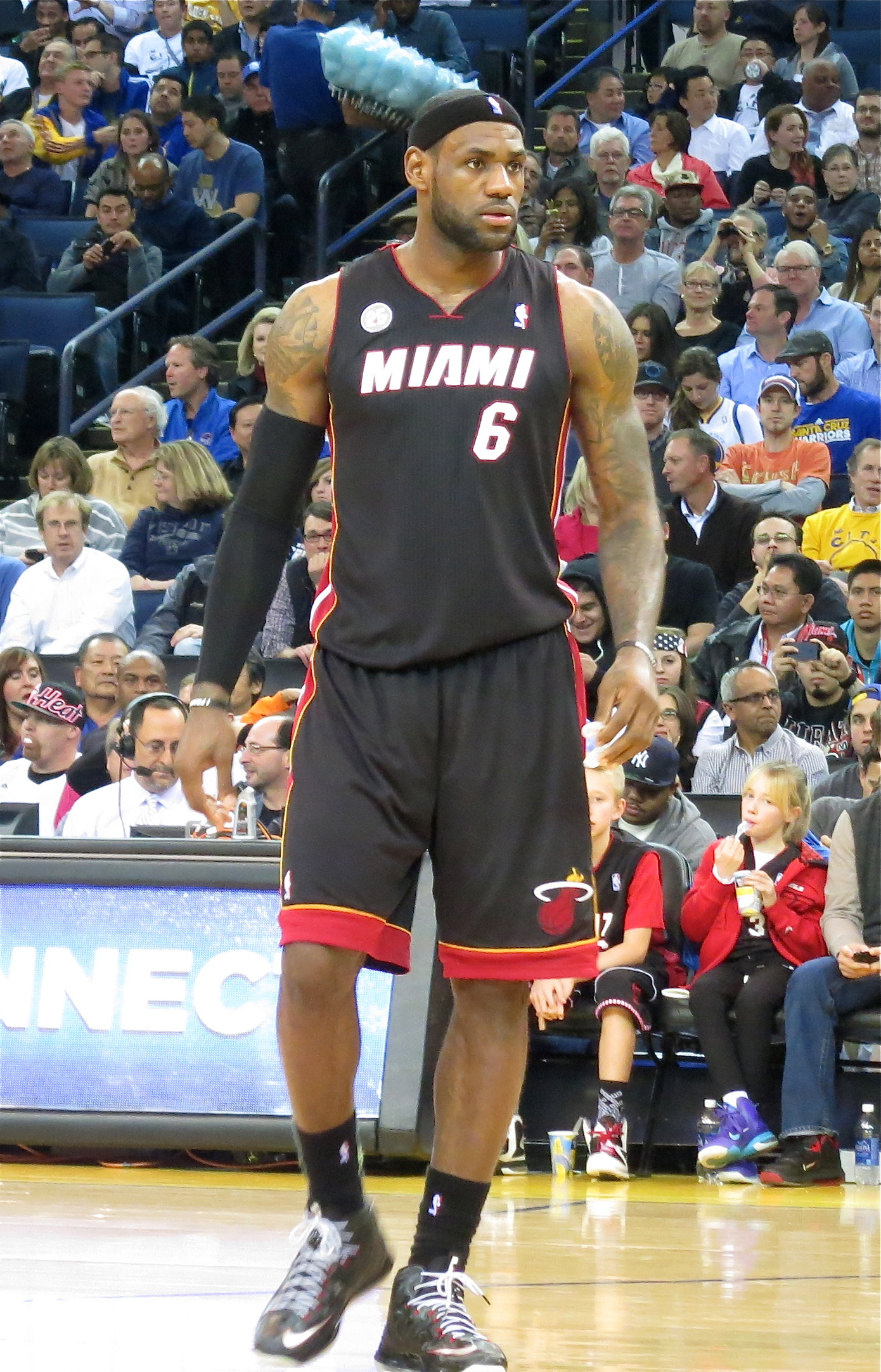
In a January 16, 2013 game against the Golden State Warriors, James became the youngest player in NBA history to score 20,000 career points.

The American professional basketball player LeBron James began his career in the National Basketball Association (NBA) when he was selected by the Cleveland Cavaliers with the first overall pick in the 2003 NBA draft. He was subsequently named the Rookie of the Year with the Cavaliers in the 2003–04 NBA season. In 2005, James made his first appearances in the NBA All-Star Game and the NBA playoffs, and led the Cavaliers to their first NBA Finals appearance in 2007. He was also the top scorer for the 2007–08 NBA season and was named the NBA Most Valuable Player (MVP) in 2009 and 2010.

In 2010, James announced on television that he would join the Miami Heat. With the Heat, he formed a trio with Dwyane Wade and Chris Bosh. They led the team to four consecutive Finals appearances from 2011 to 2014, winning back-to-back championships in 2012 and 2013, with James being named the league MVP and the NBA Finals MVP both times. He returned to the Cavaliers in 2014, and led the team to four straight Finals appearances from 2015 to 2018, giving James eight straight Finals appearances. The Cavaliers defeated the Golden State Warriors for their first championship in 2016, and James was voted the Finals MVP for the third time in his career. He signed with the Los Angeles Lakers in 2018, and led the Lakers to an NBA championship in 2020. James was named the Finals MVP for the fourth time in his career, becoming the only player to do so with three different teams.

James holds NBA records with the most NBA All-Star and All-NBA Team selections, with 22 and 21 respectively, including a record 13 First Team selections, and for the most minutes played in league history. He has also been selected into the NBA All-Defensive Team six times. He is currently the NBA's all-time scoring leader, having surpassed Kareem Abdul-Jabbar in 2023. He also ranks fourth in career assists and sixth in career steals. In 2025, while still being active in the NBA, James was inducted to the Naismith Memorial Basketball Hall of Fame as a member of the 2008 U.S. Olympic team.

== NBA career statistics ==
Correct as of the 2025–26 NBA season.

Legend
GP	Games played	GS	Games started	MPG	Minutes per game
FG%	Field goal percentage	3P%	3-point field goal percentage	FT%	Free throw percentage
RPG	Rebounds per game	APG	Assists per game	SPG	Steals per game
BPG	Blocks per game	PPG	Points per game	**Bold**	Career high
†	Won an NBA championship	*	Led the league	‡	NBA record

=== Regular season ===
Year	Team	GP	GS	MPG	FG%	3P%	FT%	RPG	APG	SPG	BPG	PPG
2003–04	Cleveland	79	79	39.5	.417	.290	.754	5.5	5.9	1.6	.7	20.9
2004–05	Cleveland	80	80	42.3*	.472	.351	.750	7.4	7.2	**2.2**	.7	27.2
2005–06	Cleveland	79	79	**42.5**	.480	.335	.738	7.0	6.6	1.6	.8	**31.4**
2006–07	Cleveland	78	78	40.9	.476	.319	.698	6.7	6.0	1.6	.7	27.3
2007–08	Cleveland	75	74	40.4	.484	.315	.712	7.9	7.2	1.8	**1.1**	30.0*
2008–09	Cleveland	81	81	37.7	.489	.344	.780	7.6	7.2	1.7	**1.1**	28.4
2009–10	Cleveland	76	76	39.0	.503	.333	.767	7.3	8.6	1.6	1.0	29.7
2010–11	Miami	79	79	38.8	.510	.330	.759	7.5	7.0	1.6	.6	26.7
2011–12†	Miami	62	62	37.5	.531	.362	.771	7.9	6.2	1.9	.8	27.1
2012–13†	Miami	76	76	37.9	.565	.406	.753	8.0	7.3	1.7	.9	26.8
2013–14	Miami	77	77	37.7	**.567**	.379	.750	6.9	6.4	1.6	.3	27.1
2014–15	Cleveland	69	69	36.1	.488	.354	.710	6.0	7.4	1.6	.7	25.3
2015–16†	Cleveland	76	76	35.6	.520	.309	.731	7.4	6.8	1.4	.6	25.3
2016–17	Cleveland	74	74	37.8*	.548	.363	.674	**8.6**	8.7	1.2	.6	26.4
2017–18	Cleveland	**82***	**82***	36.9*	.542	.367	.731	**8.6**	9.1	1.4	.9	27.5
2018–19	L.A. Lakers	55	55	35.2	.510	.339	.665	8.5	8.3	1.3	.6	27.4
2019–20†	L.A. Lakers	67	67	34.6	.493	.348	.693	7.8	**10.2***	1.2	.5	25.3
2020–21	L.A. Lakers	45	45	33.4	.513	.365	.698	7.7	7.8	1.1	.6	25.0
2021–22	L.A. Lakers	56	56	37.2	.524	.359	.756	8.2	6.2	1.3	**1.1**	30.3
2022–23	L.A. Lakers	55	54	35.5	.500	.321	.768	8.3	6.8	.9	.6	28.9
2023–24	L.A. Lakers	71	71	35.3	.540	**.410**	.750	7.3	8.3	1.3	.5	25.7
2024–25	L.A. Lakers	70	70	34.9	.513	.376	**.782**	7.8	8.2	1.0	.6	24.4
2025–26	L.A. Lakers	60	60	33.2	.515	.317	.737	6.1	7.2	1.2	.6	20.9
Career		1,622	1,620‡	37.6	.507	.348	.737	7.5	7.4	1.5	.7	26.8
All-Star		23‡	23‡	24.3	.511	.303	.738	5.3	5.1	1.0	.3	19.5

=== Playoffs ===
Year	Team	GP	GS	MPG	FG%	3P%	FT%	RPG	APG	SPG	BPG	PPG
2006	Cleveland	13	13	**46.5**	.476	.333	.737	8.1	5.8	1.4	.7	30.8
2007	Cleveland	20	20	44.7	.416	.281	.755	8.1	8.0	1.7	.5	25.1
2008	Cleveland	13	13	42.5	.411	.257	.731	7.8	7.6	1.8	1.3	28.2
2009	Cleveland	14	14	41.4	.510	.333	.749	9.1	7.3	1.6	.9	**35.3**
2010	Cleveland	11	11	41.8	.502	.400	.733	9.3	7.6	1.7	**1.8**	29.1
2011	Miami	21	21	43.9	.466	.353	.763	8.4	5.9	1.7	1.2	23.7
2012†	Miami	**23**	**23**	42.7	.500	.259	.739	9.7	5.6	1.9	.7	30.3
2013†	Miami	**23**	**23**	41.7	.491	.375	.777	8.4	6.6	1.8	.8	25.9
2014	Miami	20	20	38.2	.565	.407	**.806**	7.1	4.8	1.9	.6	27.4
2015	Cleveland	20	20	42.2	.417	.227	.731	**11.3**	8.5	1.7	1.1	30.1
2016†	Cleveland	21	21	39.1	.525	.340	.661	9.5	7.6	2.3	1.3	26.3
2017	Cleveland	18	18	41.3	.565	**.411**	.698	9.1	7.8	1.9	1.3	32.8
2018	Cleveland	22	22	41.9	.539	.342	.746	9.1	**9.0**	1.4	1.0	34.0
2020†	L.A. Lakers	21	21	36.3	.560	.370	.720	10.8	8.8	1.2	.9	27.6
2021	L.A. Lakers	6	6	37.3	.474	.375	.609	7.2	8.0	1.5	.3	23.3
2023	L.A. Lakers	16	16	38.7	.498	.264	.761	9.9	6.5	1.1	1.1	24.5
2024	L.A. Lakers	5	5	40.8	**.566**	.385	.739	6.8	8.8	**2.4**	1.0	27.8
2025	L.A. Lakers	5	5	40.8	.489	.357	.775	9.0	5.6	2.0	1.8	25.4
2026	L.A. Lakers	10	10	38.4	.459	.327	.746	6.7	7.3	1.3	.3	23.2
Career		302‡	302‡	41.2	.495	.332	.741	8.9	7.2	1.7	1.0	28.2

- **3rd most** 3-point field goals made (480)
- **3rd most** Finals appearances (10)
- **4th most** rebounds (2,628)
- **6th most** points per game (28.4)
- **6th most** personal fouls (663)

=== Career – regular season and playoffs combined ===
- **Most** points (50,473)
- **Most** consecutive games scoring (1,855) (James has scored in every game he has played)
- **Most** minutes played (71,104)
- **Most** field goals made (18,459)
- **Most** field goals attempted (36,567)
- **Most** free throws made (10,516)
- **Most** 2-point field goals made (15,420)
- **Most** games played (1,854)
- **Most** free throws attempted (14,254)
- **Most** triple-doubles (150) was 3-point field goals made (3,039)
- **Most** 2-point field goals attempted (27,802)
- **Most** defensive rebounds (12,118)
- **3rd Most** finals appearances (10)
- **Most** turnovers (5,471)

== Awards and accomplishments ==
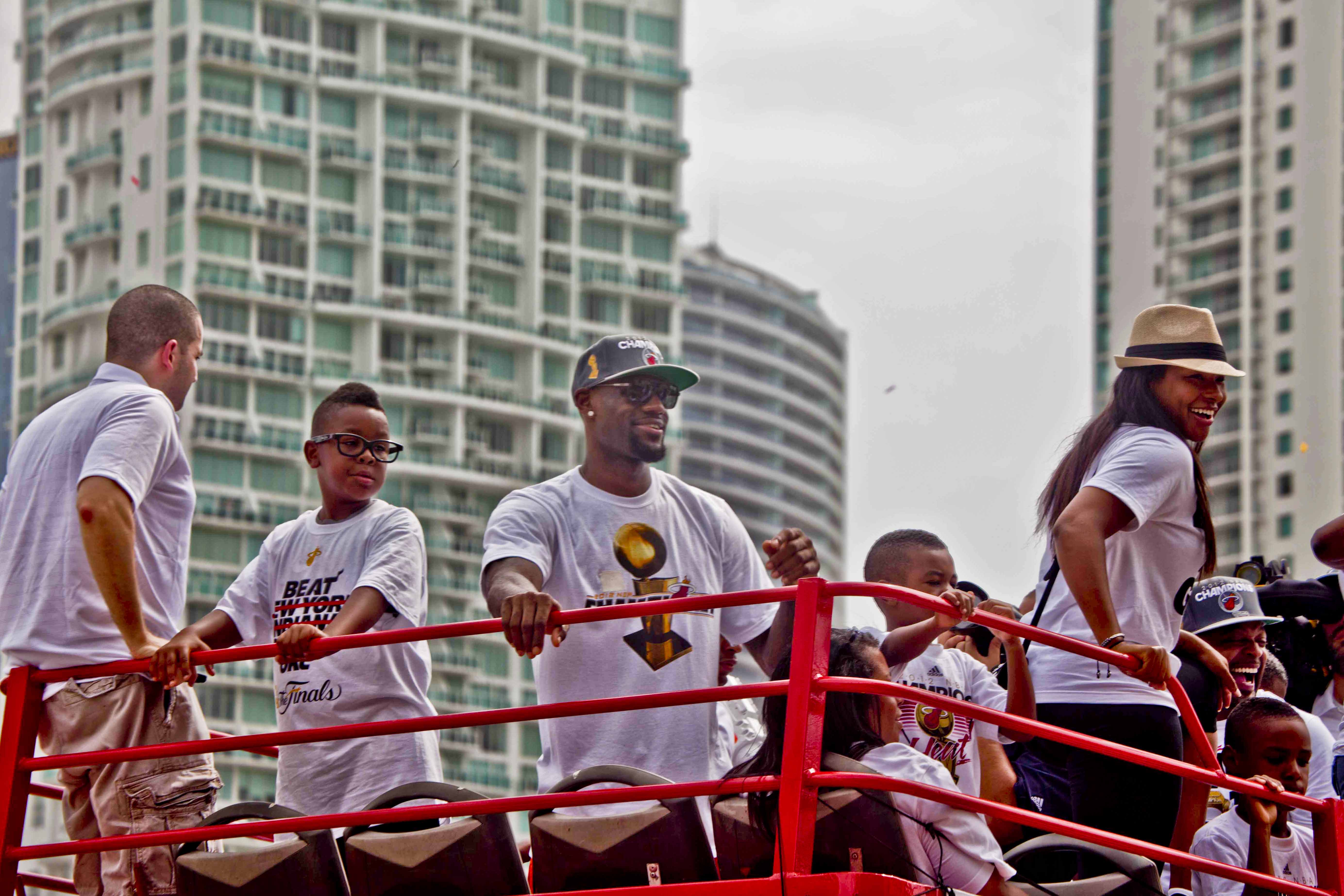
James (center) celebrates during the Heat's 2012 championship parade.

=== NBA ===
Cited from Basketball Reference's LeBron James page unless noted otherwise.

- 4× NBA champion: 2012, 2013, 2016, 2020
- 4× NBA Finals Most Valuable Player: 2012, 2013, 2016, 2020
- 4× NBA Most Valuable Player: 2009, 2010, 2012, 2013
- 22× NBA All-Star: 2005, 2006, 2007, 2008, 2009, 2010, 2011, 2012, 2013, 2014, 2015, 2016, 2017, 2018, 2019, 2020, 2021, 2022, 2023, 2024, 2025, 2026
- 3× NBA All-Star Game MVP: 2006, 2008, 2018
- 21× All-NBA selection:
  - 13× First team: 2006, 2008, 2009, 2010, 2011, 2012, 2013, 2014, 2015, 2016, 2017, 2018, 2020
  - 4× Second team: 2005, 2007, 2021, 2025
  - 4× Third team: 2019, 2022, 2023, 2024
- 6× NBA All-Defensive selection:
  - 5× First Team: 2009, 2010, 2011, 2012, 2013
  - Second Team: 2014
- NBA Rookie of the Year: 2004
- NBA All-Rookie First Team: 2004
- NBA scoring leader: 2008
- NBA assists leader: 2020
- 3× NBA minutes leader: 2007, 2017, 2018
- J. Walter Kennedy Citizenship Award: 2017
- 5× NBA Community Assist Award (2003–04) (August), (2005–06) (June), (2007–08) (June), (2017–18) (December, off-season)
- NBA Cup winner: 2023
- NBA Cup Most Valuable Player: 2023
- NBA Cup All-Tournament Team
- 41× NBA Player of the Month
- 70× NBA Player of the Week
- 6× NBA Rookie of the Month Award (2003–04) (November, December, January, February, March, April)

=== United States National Team ===
Cited from USA Basketball's LeBron James page unless noted otherwise.

- 4× Olympic medalist:
  - 3× Gold: 2008, 2012, 2024
  - Bronze: 2004
- FIBA Men's Olympics Most Valuable Player: 2024
- FIBA World Cup medalist:
  - Bronze: 2006
- FIBA AmeriCup medalist:
  - Gold: 2007
- USA Basketball Male Athlete of the Year: 2012, 2008 (as a part of the 2008 Olympic Team)

=== High school ===
Cited from the NBA's LeBron James prospect profile page unless noted otherwise.

- National Basketball champion: 2003
- 3× State champion: 2000, 2001, 2003
- 2× Gatorade National Player of the Year: 2002, 2003
- 2× Mr. Basketball USA: 2002, 2003
- 2× USA Today High School Player of the Year: 2002, 2003
- 3× Ohio Mr. Basketball: 2001, 2002, 2003
- 3× USA Today All-USA First Team: 2001, 2002, 2003
- 2× PARADE High School Player of the Year: 2002, 2003
- 2× First-team Parade All-American: 2002, 2003
- Second-team Parade All-American: 2001
- Gatorade Male Athlete of the Year: 2003
- Naismith Prep Player of the Year: 2003
- McDonald's National Player of the Year: 2003
- McDonald's High School All-American: 2003
- McDonald's Slam Dunk Contest (Powerade Jam Fest): 2003
- McDonald's All-American Game MVP: 2003
- EA Sports Roundball Classic MVP: 2003
- Jordan Brand Capital Classic MVP: 2003
- Morgan Wootten National Player of the Year: 2003

== NBA achievements ==
Achievements are current as of the 2025–26 NBA season.

=== Game-winning shots ===
with Cleveland Cavaliers
with Miami Heat
with Los Angeles Lakers

Number	Shots	Time (sec) left	Score	Opponent	Date
1	Jump shots	0.9	120–118	Charlotte Bobcats	March 22, 2006
2	Jump shots	0.5	103–101	New Orleans/Oklahoma City Hornets	April 10, 2006
3 (Playoffs)	Bank shots	5.7	97–96	Washington Wizards	April 28, 2006
4 (Playoffs)	Layup	0.9	121–120	Washington Wizards	May 3, 2006
5 (Playoffs)	Layup	2.2	109–107	Detroit Pistons	May 31, 2007
6	Layup	33.6	90–88	San Antonio Spurs	January 17, 2008
7	Layup	0.3	84–83	Portland Trail Blazers	January 30, 2008
8	2 Free Throws	7.8	90–89	Washington Wizards	February 22, 2008
9	Jump shot	0.0	106–105	Golden State Warriors	January 23, 2009
10	2 Free Throws	1.6	88–87	Atlanta Hawks	March 1, 2009
11 (Playoffs)	Three points shots	0.0	96–95	Orlando Magic	May 22, 2009
12	2 Free Throws	4.1	92–91	Miami Heat	January 25, 2010
13	2 Free Throws	29.3	141–129	Sacramento Kings	February 26, 2013
14	Layup	3.2	97–96	Orlando Magic	March 6, 2013
15	Jump shots	10.5	105–103	Boston Celtics	March 18, 2013
16 (Playoffs)	Layup	0.0	103–102	Indiana Pacers	May 22, 2013
17	Jump shots	15.1	101–99	Orlando Magic	November 23, 2013
18	Three points shots	0.1	111–110	Golden State Warriors	February 12, 2014
19	Layup	11.4	93–91	Portland Trail Blazers	March 24, 2014
20	2 Free Throws	36.4	122–121	Boston Celtics	November 14, 2014
21 (Playoffs)	Jump shots	0.0	86–84	Chicago Bulls	May 10, 2015
22	Hook shots	1.0	90–88	Brooklyn Nets	November 28, 2015
23	Three points bank shots	0.3	140–135	Washington Wizards	February 6, 2017
24	Jump shots	0.0	140–138	Minnesota Timberwolves	February 7, 2018
25 (Playoffs)	Three points shots	0.0	98–95	Indiana Pacers	April 25, 2018
26 (Playoffs)	Fadeaway shots	30.3	113–112	Toronto Raptors	May 1, 2018
27 (Playoffs)	Bank shots	0.0	105–103	Toronto Raptors	May 5, 2018
28	2 Free Throws	2.1	114–113	Dallas Mavericks	November 1, 2018
29	Dunk	15.3	107–106	Atlanta Hawks	November 12, 2018
30	2 Free Throws	5.5	99–97	Sacramento Kings	November 16, 2019
31	Tip shots	12.8	103–101	Los Angeles Clippers	July 31, 2020
32	Three points shots	58.2	103–100	Golden State Warriors	May 20, 2021
33	Layup	27.0	135–133	Utah Jazz	April 5, 2023
34	2 Free Throws	1.9	105–104	Houston Rockets	November 20, 2023
35	2 Free Throws	1.2	145–144	Golden State Warriors	January 28, 2024
36	Tip shots	0.0	120–119	Indiana Pacers	March 26, 2025
37	Jump shots	27.3	112–108	Philadelphia 76ers	December 7, 2025
38	3 Free Throws	3.0	116–114	Phoenix Suns	December 15, 2025

=== Regular season ===
==== Career ====
- 1st in career Value Over Replacement Player (VORP) (156.61).
  - 40.56 more than next player on the list.
- 3rd in career Box Plus/Minus (8.53).
  - .
- Most consecutive double-digit scoring games: 1,297 games.
- Most combined points scored on birthday (303).
- Most times being named Conference Player of the Week (69 times).
- Most times being named Conference Player of the Month (41 times).
- Most All-NBA First Team selections (13).
- Most 10-point games in NBA history (1,554).
- Most 20-point games in NBA history (1,286).
- Most 30-point games in NBA history (571).
- 5th in career Player Efficiency Rating or PER (26.88).
  - .
- Most seasons scoring at least 1,000 points (22).
- Most seasons scoring at least 2,000 points (10).
  - .
- Only player in NBA history to record at least 40,000 points, 11,500 rebounds, and 11,500 assists.
- Only player in NBA history to record at least 30,000 points, 10,000 rebounds, and 10,000 assists.
  - No other player has at least 9,000 rebounds and 9,000 assists, regardless of points.
- Only player in NBA history to post at least 2,000 points, 500 rebounds, 500 assists, and 100 steals in four consecutive seasons.
- Only player in NBA history to post at least 2,000 points, 500 rebounds, 500 assists, and 100 steals in a single season for at least eight seasons.
- Only player in NBA history to post at least 2,000 points, 500 rebounds, and 500 assists in a single season for at least eight seasons.
- Only player in NBA history to average at least 25 points per game for 20 consecutive seasons.
- Only player in NBA history to be in the top 5 all-time in points, top 10 all-time in assists, and top 10 all-time in steals.
  - No other player is in the top 10 in both categories.
- Only player in NBA history to have at least 10,000 rebounds and 10,000 assists.
- One of two players in NBA history to win four NBA Most Valuable Player Awards in a span of five years.
  - The other is Bill Russell.
- One of two players in NBA history to win at least two NBA Most Valuable Player Awards for two different franchises.
  - The other is Kareem Abdul-Jabbar.
- One of two players in NBA history to win NBA MVP, Finals MVP, and an Olympic gold medal in the same year.
  - The other is Michael Jordan (1992).
- One of two players in NBA history to win at least four NBA MVP awards and four NBA Finals MVP awards.
  - The other is Michael Jordan.
- One of two players in NBA history to record a triple double against all NBA teams.
  - The other is Russell Westbrook.
- One of six players in NBA history to win consecutive Finals MVP Awards.
  - Includes Michael Jordan, Shaquille O'Neal, Hakeem Olajuwon, Kobe Bryant and Kevin Durant.
- Only player in NBA history to score 10 points or more in 1,000 consecutive games.
- Only player in NBA history to score 100 30-point games with 3 different teams.
- Only player in NBA history to have a 40-point game against all 30 NBA teams.

==== Season ====
- Only player in NBA history to average at least 25 or more points, 8 or more assists, 50% field goals and 40% 3 point shooting in a single season.
  - Nikola Jokić has since achieved this in 2025.
- Only player in NBA history to post 30 or more points and shoot over 60% for six consecutive games in a single season.
  - Giannis Antetokounmpo has since achieved this in 2025 with 7 consecutive games.
- One of three players in NBA history to average at least 30 points, 8 rebounds, and 6 assists on 50% shooting in a single season.
  - The other two are Michael Jordan and Giannis Antetokounmpo (Giannis did it in 2 consecutive seasons).
- One of five players in NBA history to average at least 20 points, 5 rebounds, and 5 assists in their rookie season.
  - Includes Oscar Robertson, Michael Jordan, Tyreke Evans and Luka Dončić.
- One of five players in NBA history to average a triple-double in a calendar month
  - With Oscar Robertson, Wilt Chamberlain, Russell Westbrook and Luka Dončić. James is the oldest in age to do so.

==== Game ====
- Only player in NBA history to record at least 35 points, 15 assists, and 0 turnovers in a game.

=== Playoffs ===
- Most all-time playoff Points (8,162)
  - First and currently only player to pass scoring marks of 6,000, 7,000 and 8,000 points in postseason career
- Most all-time playoff Points (8,162)Most all-time playoff Wins (184)
- Most all-time playoff Points (8,162)Most all-time playoff Games (292)
- Most all-time playoff Points (8,162)Most all-time playoff Minutes (12,062)
- Most all-time playoff Points (8,162)Most all-time playoff Field Goals Made (2,971)
- Most all-time playoff Points (8,162)
- Most all-time playoff Points (8,162)Most all-time playoff Field Goal Attempts (5,984)
- Most all-time playoff Points (8,162)Most all-time playoff Field Goals Missed (3,013)
- Most all-time playoff Points (8,162)Most all-time playoff Free Throws Made (1,867)
- Most all-time playoff Points (8,162)Most all-time playoff Free Throw Attempts (2,519)
- Most all-time playoff Steals (493)
- Most all-time playoff Turnovers (1,047)
- First and currently only player in NBA history to win Finals MVP with three different franchises (2 with MIA, 1 with CLE, and 1 with LAL)
- One of only two players in NBA history to win at least one Finals MVP with an Eastern Conference team and a Western Conference team
  - The other is Kawhi Leonard

==== Career ====
- Most playoff games with at least 10 points (290).
- Most playoff games with at least 20 points (261).
- Most playoff games with at least 25 points (197)
- Most playoff games with at least 30 points (123)
- Most playoff games with at least 20 points, 5 rebounds, and 5 assists (205)
- Most playoff games with at least 20 points, 10 rebounds, and 5 assists (94)
- Most playoff games with at least 20 points, 10 rebounds, and 10 assists (26)
  - All other active players have 33 combined
- Most playoff games with at least 30 points, 5 rebounds, and 5 assists (92)
- Most playoff games with at least 30 points, 10 rebounds, and 5 assists (48).
- Most playoff games with at least 30 points, 10 rebounds, and 10 assists (15)
- Most playoff games with at least 40 points, 5 rebounds, and 5 assists (25).
  - All other active players have 65 combined
- Most playoff games with at least 40 points, 10 rebounds, and 5 assists (15)
- Most playoff games with at least 40 points, 10 rebounds, and 10 assists (3)
  - No other player has more than one (Jerry West, Charles Barkley, Russell Westbrook, Luka Dončić, Jimmy Butler, Devin Booker and Kevin Durant).
- Most playoff games with at least 45 points, 5 rebounds, and 5 assists (10)
  - Tied with Michael Jordan
- Most playoff games with at least 45 points, 10 rebounds, and 5 assists (4)
  - Tied with Russell Westbrook
- 1st in Win Shares (59.51)
  - 19.75 more than the next player on the list Michael Jordan (39.76).
- 2nd in Box Plus/Minus (10.04)
  - 1.10 behind Michael Jordan (11.14) and 0.75 behind Nikola Jokić (10.79).
- 1st in VORP - Value Over Replacement Player (36.65).
  - 11.92 more than next player on the list Michael Jordan (24.73)
- 1st all-time for postseasons with at least 500 total points (9 times)
- 2nd for consecutive 20-point games to start a playoff career (19).
  - Behind Kareem Abdul-Jabbar (27)
- 2nd place all-time for playoff games scoring at least 35 points (63)
  - Behind Michael Jordan (75)
- 2nd place all-time for playoff games scoring at least 40 points (29)
  - Behind Michael Jordan (38)
- 2nd place all-time for playoff games scoring at least 45 points (11)
  - Behind Michael Jordan (23)
- 2nd place all-time for triple-doubles in the playoffs (28).
  - Behind Magic Johnson (30)
- 1st all-time for most defensive rebounds in a playoffs career (2,186).
- 2nd place all-time for most NBA Finals MVP Awards (4).
  - Behind Michael Jordan (6)
- Only player in NBA history to be in the top 10 all-time in career playoff points, rebounds, assists, blocks and steals
- Only player in NBA history to be in the top 5 all-time in career playoff points, assists, and steals

==== Single postseason ====
- Only player in NBA history to score at least 25 points in 15 consecutive playoff games in a single postseason.
- Only player in NBA history to record at least 500 points, 200 rebounds, and 150 assists in a single postseason, multiple times (accomplished this four times-2015, 2016, 2018, and 2020)
- Only player in NBA history to record at least 600 points, 200 rebounds, and 150 assists in a single postseason, multiple times (accomplished this twice-2015 and 2018)
- Only player in NBA history to record at least 700 points, 200 rebounds, and 150 assists in a single-postseason (2018)
- Only player in NBA history to record at least 500 points, 150 rebounds, and 150 assists in a single postseason, multiple times (accomplished this six times-2007, 2013, 2015, 2016, 2018, and 2020)
- Only player in NBA history to record at least 600 points, 200 rebounds, and 100 assists in a single postseason three times (2012, 2015, and 2018)
- One of two players in NBA history to score at least 250 points, 100 rebounds and 80 assists in the first 10 games of the playoffs (2020)
  - The other is Oscar Robertson.
- One of four players in NBA history to average at least 30 points, 11 rebounds, and 8 assists per game in a single postseason (2015)
  - The others are Oscar Robertson, Russell Westbrook, and Nikola Jokić.

==== Series ====
- Only player in NBA history to lead both teams in points, rebounds, assists, blocks, and steals in a playoff series (2016 NBA Finals vs. Golden State Warriors).
- Only player in NBA history to lead both teams in points, rebounds, assists in a playoff series (twice, 2015 and 2016 NBA Finals vs. Golden State Warriors)
- One of three players in NBA history to average at least 30 points, 10 rebounds, and 10 assists in a playoff series (2017 NBA Finals vs. Golden State Warriors).
  - Includes Russell Westbrook and Nikola Jokić.
- Only player in NBA history to win over 20 consecutive games in the first round
- Only player in NBA history to sweep 10 series in the playoffs

==== Game ====
- Most consecutive points scored for a team in a playoff game with 25 consecutive points at the Detroit Pistons on May 31, 2007.
- One of three players in NBA history to record at least 45 points, 15 rebounds, and 5 assists in a playoff game.
  - Includes Wilt Chamberlain, Russell Westbrook, and Kevin Durant.
- One of two players in NBA history to have at least 51 point, 8 assists, and 8 rebounds in a playoff game
  - The other is Russell Westbrook
- One of four players in NBA history to record a triple-double in their playoff debut.
  - Includes Johnny McCarthy, Magic Johnson and Nikola Jokić

=== NBA Finals ===
- Most all-time Finals Turnovers (217)
- Most all-time Finals Defensive Rebounds (454)

James ranks in the top 10 in every other major career statistical category, except personal fouls.

Top 10 :

- 2nd Most all-time Finals Points (1,562)
- 2nd Most all-time Finals Field Goals Made (588)
- 2nd Most all-time Finals Field Goals Missed (628)
- 2nd Most all-time Finals Field Goal Attempts (1,216)
- 2nd Most all-time Finals 3-Point Field Goal Made (101)
- 2nd Most all-time Finals 3-Point Field Goal Attempts (287)
- 2nd Most all-time Finals Assists (430)
- 2nd Most all-time Finals Steals (93)
- 3rd Most all-time Finals Minutes (2,335)
- 3rd Most all-time Finals 2-point Field Goals Made (487)
- 3rd Most all-time Finals Free Throws Made (285)
- 3rd Most all-time Finals Free Throw Attempts (390)
- 3rd Most all-time Finals Offensive Rebounds (107)
- 4th Most all-time Finals Total Rebounds (107)
- 4th Most all-time Finals Games Played (55)
- 6th Most all-time Finals Blocks (46)
- 6th Most all-time Finals 2-point Field Goals Attempted (929)

==== Career ====
- Most triple-doubles with at least 30 points in the NBA Finals (4).
- Most NBA Finals games with at least 30 points, 10 rebounds, and 5 assists (9).
- 2nd most NBA Finals games with at least 40 points (7).
- Only player in NBA history to play in eight consecutive NBA Finals on different teams and tied for 4th most consecutive finals appearances with Frank Ramsey
  - Bill Russell (10), Tom Heinsohn (9), Sam Jones (9), and Frank Ramsey (8) played in eight or more consecutive finals on the same team
- Only player in NBA history to average a triple double in the NBA Finals.

==== Series ====
- Most points per game scored by a player on the winning team in any seven-game NBA Finals series with 29.7.
- 2nd place all-time for highest percentage of team points in an NBA Finals series.
  - Behind Michael Jordan's 38.4%; James accounted for 38.3% of his team's points in the 2015 NBA Finals.
- Only player in NBA history to record at least two triple-doubles with 30 or more points in one NBA Finals series.
- Only player in NBA history to average at least 25 points, 10 rebounds, and 7 assists in an NBA Finals series (accomplished this six times-2012, 2013, 2015, 2016, 2017, and 2020).
- Only player in NBA history to lead both teams in points, rebounds, and assists in an NBA Finals series. (2015 and 2016; also led both teams in steals and blocks in the 2016 Finals.)
- Only player in NBA history to average a triple-double in an NBA Finals series.
  - James averaged 33.6 points, 12.0 rebounds, and 10.0 assists in the 2017 NBA Finals.
- Only player in NBA history to average at least 35 points, 10 rebounds, and 5 assists in an NBA Finals series.
  - James averaged 35.8 points, 13.3 rebounds, 8.8 assists in the 2015 NBA Finals.
- Only player in NBA history to score at least 40 points in consecutive elimination games in a single NBA Finals series.
- One of three players in NBA history to score at least 40 points in at least three games in a single NBA Finals series.
  - Includes Michael Jordan (who scored at least 40 points in four games in a row in the 1993 NBA Finals) and Shaquille O'Neal.

==== Game ====
- Only player in NBA history to score at least 40 points and record at least half of his team's assists in an NBA Finals game.
  - James achieved this twice in a single NBA Finals series.
- One of two players in NBA history to record at least 35 points, 15 rebounds, and 10 assists in an NBA Finals game.
  - Includes James Worthy.
  - One of three players in NBA history to record a triple-double with at least 40 points in an NBA Finals game.
  - Includes Jerry West and Jimmy Butler.
- One of two players in NBA history to record a triple-double in an NBA Finals clinching game, twice.
  - Includes Magic Johnson (1982 and 1985).
- One of three players in NBA history to record a triple-double in an elimination game in an NBA Finals game.
  - Includes Bill Russell and James Worthy.
- One of three players in NBA history to record a triple-double in Game 7 of the NBA Finals.
  - Includes Jerry West and James Worthy.
- One of four players in NBA history to score at least 40 points in consecutive NBA Finals games.
  - Includes Jerry West (achieved this twice), Michael Jordan (achieved this in four consecutive games), Rick Barry, Shaquille O'Neal.
- One of six players in NBA history to record a triple-double in Game 1 of the NBA Finals.
  - Includes Wilt Chamberlain (1967), Walt Frazier (1972), Dave Cowens (1976), Magic Johnson (1991), and Jason Kidd (2002).

=== Youngest player records ===
James owns numerous NBA "youngest player" records. He is the youngest^{1}

- To be selected #1 overall draft pick (18 years of age).
- To be named NBA Rookie of the Year (19 years of age).
- To score most points by prep-to-pro player in their professional debut (25)
- To score 30 points in a game (18 years, 334 days).
  - Recorded 33 points on November 29, 2003, vs. Memphis Grizzlies
- To score 40 points in a game (19 years, 88 days).
  - Recorded 41 points on March 27, 2004, vs. New Jersey Nets.
- To score 35+ points, 10+ rebounds and 7+ 3-pointers: 20 years, 100 days; 40 points, 10 rebounds, 7 3-pointers also had 10 assists. (he was also the oldest)
- To score 2,000 points in a season (2004–05).
- To average at least 30 points per game in the NBA.
- To be awarded All-NBA honors (2004–05).
- To be named to the All-NBA first team (21 years, 138 days).
- To win an All-Star Game MVP (21 years, 55 days).
- To lead the league in All-Star voting (22 years, 26 days).
- To score 2,000 points in seven consecutive seasons (26 years of age).
- To win Most Valuable Player award four times (28 years of age).
- To reach 4,000 playoff points (29 years of age).
- To reach 5,000 playoff points (30 years of age).
- To reach 6,000 playoff points (32 years of age).
- To reach 7,000 playoff points (35 years of age).
- To reach 8,000 playoff points (38 years of age).
- To reach every thousand-point milestone from 1,000 to 42,000.

Notes: ^{1} Beginning in 2006 the NBA introduced age requirement restrictions. Prospective high school players must now wait at least a year before entering the NBA. (Note: Under current NBA draft rules, draftees must also be at least 19 years old during the calendar year of the draft. This will usually happen after a player is one season removed from high school, but not always—under current rules, Brad Daugherty (selected #1 overall in 1986 after a four-year college career at North Carolina) would not have been eligible for the draft until two years after his high school graduation, because he graduated while still 16.)

=== Oldest player records ===
- To average a triple-double in a calendar month (February 2018; 33 years 69 days on February 28, 2018)
- To have multiple 50 point games in a season (March 2022): 37 years 65 days & 37 years 71 days (this is also the record for a single month and single week).
- To score 25+ points in 11+ consecutive games (streak was 23 games) : 36 years 354 days to 37 years 48 days.
- To score 40+ points and 11+ rebounds in a game (had 43 points and 14 rebounds) : 37 years, 1 day.
- To score a 30-point triple-double: 40 years, 33 days.
- To average over 30 points per game for a season: 37 years, 101 days; 30.3 points.
- To score 5 or more consecutive 30 point games: 7 games, 37 years 346 days to 37 years 360 days.
- To score 35+ points, 10+ rebounds and 7+ 3-pointers: 37 years 331 days; 39 points, 11 rebounds, 7 3-pointers. (he was also the youngest)
- To have back to back 40+ point, 10+ rebound games: 38 years 0 days & 38 years 3 days.
- To score a 20-point triple-double: 28 pts, 10 rebounds, 11 assists, 38 years 32 days.
- To average 25 points a game in a season: 25.7 points per game : 39 yrs - 100 days (2023-24).
- To have a 20-point, 20 rebound game (happened in playoffs):22 points, 20 rebounds: 38 years 115 days.

== Cleveland Cavaliers franchise records ==
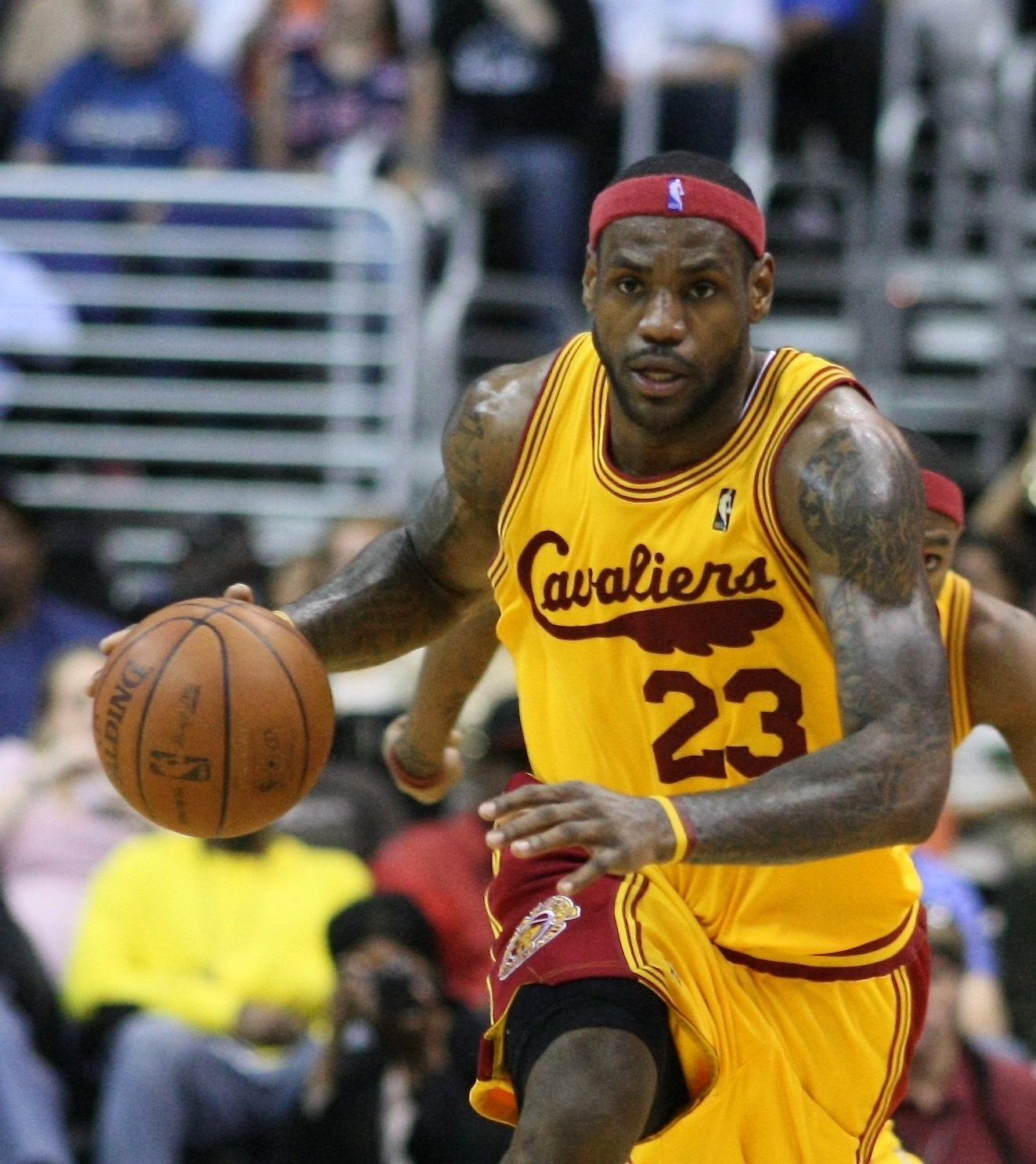
James during his first tenure with the Cleveland Cavaliers.

=== Regular season ===
==== Season ====
Season records cited from the Cavaliers' official website unless noted otherwise.

- Minutes played: 3,388 (2004–05)
- Field goals: 875 (2005–06)
- Field goal attempts: 1,823 (2005–06)
- Free throws: 601 (2005–06)
- Free throw attempts: 814 (2005–06)
- Points: 2,478 (2005–06)
- Points per game: 31.4 (2005–06)
- 50 point games: 3 (2008–09)
- 40 point games: 10 (2005–06)

==== Game ====
Individual game records cited from the Cavaliers' official website unless noted otherwise.

- Field goal attempts: 36, at Toronto Raptors, March 20, 2005
- Three-point field goals: 8, at Milwaukee Bucks, (JR Smith tied) February 20, 2009
  - Shares record with Danny Ferry and Wesley Person
- Three-point field goals, quarter: 5, four times
  - Shares record with Mark Price, Steve Kerr, and Wesley Person
- Three-point field goal attempts: 13, three times
  - Shares record with Dan Majerle
- Free throws: 24, at Miami Heat, March 12, 2006
- Free throws made, half: 16, second half, at Miami Heat, March 12, 2006
- Turnovers, half: 9, second half, at New Orleans Hornets, March 28, 2005
- Points, quarter: 24, two times

=== Playoffs ===
==== Career ====
- Games played: 152
- Minutes played: 6,421
- Points: 4,573
- Free Throws Made: 1,070
- Free Throws Attempts: 1,466
- Field Goals Made: 1,628
- Field Goals Attempts: 3,459
- 3 Point Field Goals Made: 247
- 3 Point Field Goal Attempts: 764
- Total Rebounds: 1,388
- Offensive Rebounds: 227
- Defensive Rebounds: 1,161
- Assists: 1,188
- Steals: 264
- Blocks: 162
- Triple Doubles: 15

==== Scoring ====
- Points per game average, career: 28.9
- Points, game: 51, at Golden State Warriors, May 31, 2018
- Points, half: 28, first half, at Boston Celtics, May 7, 2010
- Points, quarter: 23, first quarter, at Boston Celtics, May 7, 2010
- Points, overtime: 10, at Orlando Magic, May 26, 2009
- Consecutive points, game: 25, from 2:16 of fourth quarter to end of game (second overtime), at Detroit Pistons, May 31, 2007
  - LeBron scored his team's last seven points in the fourth quarter, all nine of his team's points in the first overtime, and all nine of his team's points in the second overtime.
- Games scoring 40 or more points, career: 14

==== Field goals ====
- Field goals made, game: 20, vs. Orlando Magic, May 20, 2009
- Field goals made, half: 11 (2 games)
- Field goals made, quarter: 8, first quarter, at Boston Celtics, May 7, 2010
- Field goals made, overtime: 4, second overtime, at Detroit Pistons, May 31, 2007
- Field goal attempts, game: 33, at Detroit Pistons, May 31, 2007 (2 OT)
- Field goal attempts, half: 17, first half, at Detroit Pistons, May 17, 2006

==== Three-point field goals ====
- Three-point field goals made, game: 7, at Washington Wizards, April 30, 2006
- Three-point field goals made, half: 5, first half, at Washington Wizards, April 30, 2006
  - Tied by Daniel Gibson (second half, vs. Detroit Pistons, June 2, 2007)
- Three-point field goals made, overtime: 1, second overtime, at Detroit Pistons, May 31, 2007
  - Tied with Mark Price (at Chicago Bulls, May 5, 1989)
- Three-point field goal attempts, half: 9, second half, at Boston Celtics, May 18, 2008

==== Free throws ====
- Free throws made, game: 18, at Orlando Magic, May 24, 2009
- Free throws made, quarter: 10, fourth quarter, vs. Detroit Pistons, May 19, 2006
- Free throws made, overtime: 5, first overtime, at Detroit Pistons, May 31, 2007
- Free throw attempts, game: 24, at Orlando Magic, May 24, 2009
- Free throw attempts, half: 16, second half, at Orlando Magic, May 24, 2009
- Free throw attempts, quarter: 12 (2 games)
- Free throw attempts, overtime: 6, first overtime, at Detroit Pistons, May 31, 2007

==== Rebounding ====
- Rebounds, half: 13, second half, at Boston Celtics, May 13, 2010
- Defensive rebounds, game: 16, at Boston Celtics, May 13, 2010
  - Tied with Brad Daugherty (vs. New Jersey Nets, May 9, 1993)
- Defensive rebounds, half: 12, second half, at Boston Celtics, May 13, 2010

==== Turnovers ====
- Turnovers, game: 10, (2 games)

== Miami Heat franchise records ==
=== Regular season ===
==== Career ====
Career records cited from Basketball Reference's Miami Heat Career Leaders page unless noted otherwise.

- Minutes Per Game: 38.0
- Points Per Game: 26.9
- Triple-doubles: 13 (five in playoffs)
- Playoff points per game: 26.9

==== Scoring ====
Points, quarter: 25 twice,

- first quarter at Cleveland Cavaliers, March 18, 2014
- third quarter vs Charlotte Bobcats, March 3, 2014

==== Field goals ====
- Field goals made, game: 22, vs. Charlotte Bobcats, March 3, 2014
- Field goals made, first half: 12, at Orlando Magic, February 3, 2011
- Field goals made, quarter: 10, third quarter, at Cleveland Cavaliers, December 2, 2010

==== Turnovers ====
- Turnovers, quarter: 5, first quarter, at Philadelphia 76ers, October 27, 2010
  - Tied with Jamal Mashburn (first quarter, vs. Sacramento Kings, November 29, 1999) and Lamar Odom (second quarter, vs. Washington Wizards, December 23, 2004)

==== Triple-doubles ====
- Triple-doubles, career: 13 (five in playoffs)
- Triple-doubles, season: 4, twice
  - 2010–11
  - 2012–13

==== Minutes ====
- Minutes played, game, 50:17 at Boston Celtics, May 9, 2011

== Los Angeles Lakers franchise records ==
=== Regular season ===
==== Career ====
- Box score plus/minus: 8.1
- Offensive box score plus/minus: 6.5

== Other ==
Complete list of awards, honors and nominations received by LeBron James
Organizations (Note: Awards, festivals, honors and other miscellaneous organizations are listed in alphabetical order.)	Year (Note: Year in which award ceremony was held.)	Category	Work	Result	Ref
African-American Film Critics Association	2016	Special Achievement Award	Himself	Won	
African-American Film Critics Association	2020	Best short	I Promise,	Won	
Black Reel Awards for Television	2020	Outstanding Television Movie or Limited Series	Self Made: Inspired by the Life of Madam C. J. Walker	Nominated	
Daytime Emmy Awards	2022	Outstanding Informative Talk Show	Turning the Tables with Robin Roberts	Won	
Golden Raspberry Awards	2022	Worst Picture	Space Jam: A New Legacy	Nominated	
Golden Raspberry Awards	2022	Worst Actor	Space Jam: A New Legacy	Won	
Golden Raspberry Awards	2022	Worst Screen Combo	Space Jam: A New Legacy	Won	
Kids' Choice Awards	2022	Favorite Movie Actor	Space Jam: A New Legacy	Nominated	
Primetime Emmy Awards	2021	Outstanding Unstructured Reality Program	Becoming	Nominated	
Producers Guild of America Awards	2020	Outstanding Sports Program	What's My Name: Muhammad Ali	Won	
Sports Emmy Awards	2019	Outstanding Long Sports Documentary	What's My Name: Muhammad Ali	Won	
The Streamer Awards	2025	Best Streamed Collab	Himself and Kai Cenat	Won	
