= Anthony Bowie =

American basketball player (born 1963)

Personal information
- Born: November 9, 1963 (age 63) Tulsa, Oklahoma, U.S.
- Listed height: 6 ft 6 in (1.98 m)
- Listed weight: 190 lb (86 kg)

Career information
- High school: East Central (Tulsa, Oklahoma)
- College: Seminole State (1982–1984); Oklahoma (1984–1986)
- NBA draft: 1986: 3rd round, 66th overall pick
- Drafted by: Houston Rockets
- Playing career: 1986–2002
- Position: Shooting guard / small forward
- Number: 25, 14, 13

Career history
- 1987–1989: Quad City Thunder
- 1989: San Antonio Spurs
- 1989–1990: Houston Rockets
- 1990–1991: Ranger Varese
- 1991: Quad City Thunder
- 1991–1996: Orlando Magic
- 1996–1997: Olimpia Milano
- 1998: New York Knicks
- 1998–1999: Žalgiris Kaunas
- 1999–2000: AEK Athens
- 2000–2001: Aris Thessaloniki
- 2001: Fortitudo Bologna
- 2001: Near East
- 2001–2002: Ural Great

Career highlights
- EuroLeague champion (1999); FIBA EuroStar (1999); FIBA Saporta Cup champion (2000); FIBA Saporta Cup Finals MVP (2000); Greek Cup winner (2000); Greek League All-Star (1999); Russian League champion (2002); Lithuanian League champion (1999); CBA Most Valuable Player (1989); All-CBA First Team (1989)

Career NBA statistics
- Points: 2,945 (6.4 ppg)
- Rebounds: 1,021 (2.2 apg)
- Stats at NBA.com
- Stats at Basketball Reference

Anthony Lee Bowie (born November 9, 1963) is an American former professional basketball player. He is a former NBA shooting guard, most renowned for his stint with the Orlando Magic. With the Magic, Bowie became one of the top bench players, often stepping in to provide a spark and energy, timely baskets, and defensive stops. He is currently an Elementary School P.E coach.

== College career ==
After high school, Bowie played college basketball at Seminole State, from 1982 to 1984, and at Oklahoma, from 1984 to 1986.

== Professional career ==
Bowie was selected in the third round (66th overall pick), of the 1986 NBA draft, by the Houston Rockets, out of the University of Oklahoma. After he bounced around in Europe, and in several minor leagues, playing for the Rockets in the 1986 and 1987 preseason games, and for the New Jersey Nets, during the 1988 preseason. Bowie played for the Quad City Thunder of the Continental Basketball Association (CBA) from 1987 to 1989 and was selected as the CBA Most Valuable Player and named to the All-CBA First Team in 1989. He debuted in the NBA, with the San Antonio Spurs in 1989. After the end of the 1988–89 season, San Antonio re-signed him, and traded him for cash, to the team that drafted him, the Rockets, where he played 66 games that season.

He spent the 1990–91 season in Italy, with Ranger Varese. During the 1991 off-season, he played for the Chicago Bulls. Later, in the 1991–92 season, Bowie was signed by the Orlando Magic, during a West Coast road trip, and he remained with the team for five seasons. His tenure with the Magic was his most productive. Along with Donald Royal, Bowie provided the Magic with a spark off the bench, and was often used to guard the opponent's top offensive player. He was also good at hitting the jump shot, and could also hit the three-pointer. He was also with Magic in the 1995 NBA Finals.

He returned to Italy, to play with Stefanel Milano, in the 1996–97 season. In January 1998, Bowie joined the New York Knicks, and played in 27 games for them, in the 1997–98 season.

Then he returned to Europe, where he won the EuroLeague championship with the Lithuania Basketball League team, Žalgiris kaunas, in 1999. Then he played in the Greek Basket League, with AEK Athens, winning with them both the FIBA Saporta Cup and the Greek Cup, in 2000. From January to June 2001, he played in Italy again, with Paf Bologna. He played in the Italian League Finals series, which Paf lost to Kinder Bologna. After that season, he retired from playing professional basketball.

=== The triple-double ===
Bowie is most remembered for a triple-double in which he had 20 points, 10 rebounds, and 10 assists against the Detroit Pistons on March 9, 1996. After rebounding a missed Detroit free throw, Bowie immediately called a timeout against the wishes of Magic coach Brian Hill, who, in disgust, let Bowie dictate the next play to his teammates. Bowie proceeded to set up a play so that he could catch the inbounds pass, and pass it to a player in a position for the shot, which he accomplished when forward David Vaughn dunked the resulting inbounds pass for the tenth assist. Pistons coach Doug Collins took his players off the court in response to Bowie's poor sportsmanship, but since he could not actually bench his players, he instead ordered them to stand underneath the basket closest to the visitors' locker room in protest. In 2003, Ricky Davis attempted to shoot at his own basket to complete a rebound for a triple-double.

== Coaching career ==
In 2003, Bowie was named the head coach of the Bishop Moore High School's basketball team, a private school in Orlando.

== Career statistics ==
Legend
GP	Games played	GS	Games started	MPG	Minutes per game
FG%	Field goal percentage	3P%	3-point field goal percentage	FT%	Free throw percentage
RPG	Rebounds per game	APG	Assists per game	SPG	Steals per game
BPG	Blocks per game	PPG	Points per game	**Bold**	Career high

=== NBA ===
==== Regular season ====
Year	Team	GP	GS	MPG	FG%	3P%	FT%	RPG	APG	SPG	BPG	PPG
1988–89	San Antonio	18	5	24.3	.500	.200	.667	3.1	1.6	1.0	.2	8.6
1989–90	Houston	66	0	13.9	.406	.286	.741	1.8	1.5	.6	.1	4.3
1991–92	Orlando	52	26	**33.1**	.493	.386	.860	**4.7**	**3.1**	**1.1**	**.7**	**14.6**
1992–93	Orlando	**77**	**45**	22.9	.471	.313	.798	2.5	2.3	.7	.2	8.0
1993–94	Orlando	70	0	13.5	.481	.056	.837	1.7	1.5	.5	.2	4.6
1994–95	Orlando	**77**	4	16.4	.480	.300	.836	1.8	2.1	.6	.3	5.5
1995–96	Orlando	74	4	14.6	.471	.387	.870	1.7	1.4	.5	.1	4.2
1997–98	New York	27	3	8.3	**.542**	**.750**	**.889**	1.0	.4	.2	.1	2.8
Career		461	87	18.1	.475	.318	.824	2.2	1.8	.6	.2	6.4

==== Playoffs ====
Year	Team	GP	GS	MPG	FG%	3P%	FT%	RPG	APG	SPG	BPG	PPG
1990	Houston	2	0	2.0	.000	–	–	.0	.0	.0	.0	.0
1994	Orlando	2	0	6.5	.000	–	–	.0	.0	.0	.0	.0
1995	Orlando	**17**	0	6.9	**.500**	**.714**	.889	.7	1.1	.1	.1	**3.2**
1996	Orlando	12	**1**	**12.7**	.481	–	**1.000**	**1.4**	**1.2**	**.3**	**.2**	2.5
1998	New York	7	0	3.3	**.500**	–	–	.0	.1	.1	.0	.6
Career		40	1	7.8	.480	.714	.923	.7	.8	.1	.1	2.2
