= 1996–97 Orlando Magic season =

NBA professional basketball team season

- Head coach: Brian Hill (fired); Richie Adubato (interim)
- President: Bob Vander Weide
- General manager: John Gabriel
- Owner: Richard DeVos
- Arena: Orlando Arena

Results
- Record: 45–37 (.549)
- Place: Division: 3rd (Atlantic); Conference: 7th (Eastern)
- Playoff finish: First round (lost to Heat 2–3)
- Stats at Basketball Reference

Local media
- Television: WKCF; Sunshine Network
- Radio: WDBO

The 1996–97 Orlando Magic season was the eighth season for the Orlando Magic in the National Basketball Association.

== Season summary ==
=== Off-season ===
After losing All-Star center Shaquille O'Neal via free agency to the Los Angeles Lakers during the off-season, the Magic acquired Felton Spencer from the Utah Jazz, and signed free agents Gerald Wilkins, Derek Strong, and Danny Schayes. However, after only playing just one game for the team, Spencer was then traded along with Donald Royal, and Jon Koncak to the Golden State Warriors in exchange for Rony Seikaly.

=== Regular season ===
Early into the regular season, the Magic traveled overseas to Tokyo, Japan to play two games against the New Jersey Nets at the Tokyo Dome. In the first game on November 7, 1996, the Magic were the road team and defeated the Nets by a score of 108–85; Penny Hardaway led the team with 23 points, while Wilkins scored 18 points off the bench. In the second game on November 8, the Magic were the home team and defeated the Nets by a score of 86–82; Hardaway led the team with 29 points, while Horace Grant finished with a double-double of 18 points and 13 rebounds. Each game recorded an attendance of 38,639 at the Tokyo Dome.

With the addition of Seikaly, Wilkins and Strong, the Magic got off to an 8–4 start to the regular season in November, but then struggled losing ten of their twelve games in December, falling below .500 in winning percentage with a 10–16 record at the end of the month. However, the team won 11 of their 15 games in January, and later on held a 24–20 record at the All-Star break. The team posted a five-game losing streak after the All-Star break, as head coach Brian Hill was fired 49 games into the season, and Hardaway was generally blamed for leading a player revolt that resulted in his dismissal; Hill was replaced with assistant coach Richie Adubato as an interim coach for the remainder of the season. Under Adubato, the Magic posted a six-game winning streak in February, and finished in third place in the Atlantic Division with a 45–37 record, earning the seventh seed in the Eastern Conference.

Hardaway averaged 20.5 points, 5.6 assists and 1.6 steals per game, and was named to the All-NBA Third Team, despite only playing 59 games due to knee injuries, while Seikaly averaged 17.3 points, 9.5 rebounds and 1.4 blocks per game, and Grant provided the team with 12.6 points, 9.0 rebounds and 1.5 steals per game. In addition, three-point specialist Dennis Scott contributed 12.5 points per game, and led the Magic with 147 three-point field goals, and Nick Anderson provided with 12.0 points and 1.9 steals per game, along with 143 three-point field goals, but struggled shooting just .404 in free-throw percentage. Off the bench, Wilkins contributed 10.6 points per game, while Strong averaged 8.5 points and 6.3 rebounds per game, Brian Shaw provided with 7.2 points and 4.1 assists per game, and Darrell Armstrong contributed 6.1 points and 2.6 assists per game.

During the NBA All-Star weekend at the Gund Arena in Cleveland, Ohio, Hardaway was selected for the 1997 NBA All-Star Game, as a member of the Eastern Conference All-Star team. Hardaway scored 19 points along with 2 steals, as the Eastern Conference defeated the Western Conference, 132–120. Seikaly finished tied in twelfth place in Most Improved Player voting, while Grant finished tied in sixth place in Defensive Player of the Year voting.

The Magic finished ninth in the NBA in home-game attendance, with an attendance of 711,311 at the Orlando Arena during the regular season.

=== NBA playoffs ===
In the Eastern Conference First Round of the 1997 NBA playoffs, the Magic faced off against their in-state rivals, the 2nd–seeded and Atlantic Division champion Miami Heat, who were led by All-Star guard Tim Hardaway, All-Star center Alonzo Mourning, and Jamal Mashburn. Prior to the playoffs, Grant was out due to a season-ending wrist injury, and was replaced with Strong as the team's starting power forward.

The Magic lost the first two games to the Heat on the road at the Miami Arena, which included a 35-point margin loss in Game 1 by a score of 99–64, in which the Magic struggled only shooting .306 in field-goal percentage. In Game 3 at home at the Orlando Arena, despite the Heat leading by 20 points early in the second quarter, and losing Seikaly for the rest of the series due to a foot injury, the Magic won the game by a score of 88–75, in which Penny Hardaway scored 42 points. The Magic won Game 4 over the Heat at home, 99–91 to even the series, as Hardaway scored 41 points. However, the Magic lost Game 5 to the Heat at the Miami Arena, 91–83, thus losing in a hard-fought five-game series.

As of 2026, this was the only NBA playoff matchup between both teams from Florida.

=== Aftermath ===
Following the season, Scott was involved in controversy after a public outburst at a youth basketball camp in Sterling, Virginia during the off-season, in which he threatened to retire from the NBA due to a contract dispute with the Magic; he was later on traded to the Dallas Mavericks after seven seasons in Orlando. Meanwhile, Shaw was traded to the Golden State Warriors, and Adubato was fired as head coach.

== Draft picks ==
Round	Pick	Player	Position	Nationality	School/Club team
1	27	Brian Evans	SF	United States	Indiana
2	49	Amal McCaskill	C	United States	Marquette

== Roster ==
1996–97 Orlando Magic roster
Players

Pos.	No.	Player	Height	Weight	DOB	From
G/F	25	Nick Anderson	6 ft 6 in (1.98 m)	205 lb (93 kg)	1968–01–20	Illinois
G	10	Darrell Armstrong	6 ft 0 in (1.83 m)	170 lb (77 kg)	1968–06–22	Fayetteville State
G	5	Dell Demps	6 ft 3 in (1.91 m)	205 lb (93 kg)	1970–02–12	Pacific
F	34	Brian Evans	6 ft 8 in (2.03 m)	220 lb (100 kg)	1973–09–13	Indiana
F	54	Horace Grant	6 ft 10 in (2.08 m)	215 lb (98 kg)	1965–07–04	Clemson
G	1	Penny Hardaway	6 ft 7 in (2.01 m)	195 lb (88 kg)	1971–07–18	Memphis
C	00	Amal McCaskill	6 ft 11 in (2.11 m)	235 lb (107 kg)	1973–10–28	Marquette
F	24	Danny Schayes	6 ft 11 in (2.11 m)	235 lb (107 kg)	1959–05–10	Syracuse
G/F	3	Dennis Scott	6 ft 8 in (2.03 m)	229 lb (104 kg)	1968–09–05	Georgia Tech
C	4	Rony Seikaly	6 ft 11 in (2.11 m)	230 lb (104 kg)	1965–05–10	Syracuse
G	20	Brian Shaw	6 ft 6 in (1.98 m)	190 lb (86 kg)	1966–03–22	UC Santa Barbara
F	33	Derek Strong	6 ft 8 in (2.03 m)	220 lb (100 kg)	1968–02–09	Xavier
F	42	David Vaughn	6 ft 9 in (2.06 m)	240 lb (109 kg)	1973–03–23	Memphis
G	21	Gerald Wilkins	6 ft 6 in (1.98 m)	185 lb (84 kg)	1963–09–11	Chattanooga

Coaches
Head coach
- Brian Hill (fired)
- Richie Adubato (interim)
Assistant(s)
- Tree Rollins
- Tom Sterner

Legend
- (DP) Unsigned draft pick
- (FA) Free agent
- (S) Suspended
- Injured

Roster
Updated: February 18, 1997

== Regular season ==
=== Season standings ===
Atlantic Division	W	L	PCT	GB	Home	Road	Div
y-Miami Heat	61	21	.744	–	29–12	32–9	16–8
x-New York Knicks	57	25	.695	4	31–10	26–15	19–6
x-Orlando Magic	45	37	.549	16	26–15	19–22	13–11
x-Washington Bullets	44	38	.537	17	25–16	19–22	14–10
New Jersey Nets	26	56	.317	35	16–25	10–31	11–13
Philadelphia 76ers	22	60	.268	39	11–30	11–30	11–14
Boston Celtics	15	67	.183	46	11–30	4–37	1–23

1996–97 NBA East standings
#	Eastern Conference				
#	Team	W	L	PCT	GB
1	z-Chicago Bulls	69	13	.841	–
2	y-Miami Heat	61	21	.744	8
3	x-New York Knicks	57	25	.695	12
4	x-Atlanta Hawks	56	26	.683	13
5	x-Detroit Pistons	54	28	.659	15
6	x-Charlotte Hornets	54	28	.659	15
7	x-Orlando Magic	45	37	.549	24
8	x-Washington Bullets	44	38	.537	25
9	Cleveland Cavaliers	42	40	.512	27
10	Indiana Pacers	39	43	.476	30
11	Milwaukee Bucks	33	49	.402	36
12	Toronto Raptors	30	52	.366	39
13	New Jersey Nets	26	56	.317	43
14	Philadelphia 76ers	22	60	.268	47
15	Boston Celtics	15	67	.183	54

z – clinched division title
y – clinched division title
x – clinched playoff spot

== Playoffs ==
1997 playoff game log
First round: 2–3 (home: 2–0; road: 0–3)

Game	Date	Team	Score	High points	High rebounds	High assists	Location Attendance	Series
1	April 24	@ Miami	L 64–99	Derek Strong (15)	Nick Anderson (12)	Penny Hardaway (3)	Miami Arena; 15,200	0–1
2	April 27	@ Miami	L 87–104	Penny Hardaway (26)	Derek Strong (16)	Brian Shaw (4)	Miami Arena; 15,200	0–2
3	April 29	Miami	W 88–75	Penny Hardaway (42)	Penny Hardaway (8)	Darrell Armstrong (8)	Orlando Arena; 17,248	1–2
4	May 1	Miami	W 99–91	Penny Hardaway (41)	Darrell Armstrong (9)	Penny Hardaway (4)	Orlando Arena; 16,555	2–2
5	May 4	@ Miami	L 83–91	Penny Hardaway (33)	Derek Strong (12)	Penny Hardaway (6)	Miami Arena; 15,200	2–3

1997 schedule

== Player statistics ==
=== Regular season ===
Player	POS	GP	GS	MP	REB	AST	STL	BLK	PTS	MPG	RPG	APG	SPG	BPG	PPG
Derek Strong	PF	82	21	2,004	519	73	47	20	699	24.4	6.3	.9	.6	.2	8.5
Gerald Wilkins	SG	80	26	2,202	173	173	54	12	848	27.5	2.2	2.2	.7	.2	10.6
Brian Shaw	PG	77	31	1,867	194	319	67	26	552	24.2	2.5	4.1	.9	.3	7.2
Rony Seikaly	C	74	68	2,615	701	92	49	107	1,277	35.3	9.5	1.2	.7	1.4	17.3
Horace Grant	PF	67	67	2,496	600	163	101	65	845	37.3	9.0	2.4	1.5	1.0	12.6
Darrell Armstrong	PG	67	0	1,010	76	175	61	9	411	15.1	1.1	2.6	.9	.1	6.1
Dennis Scott	SF	66	62	2,166	203	139	74	19	823	32.8	3.1	2.1	1.1	.3	12.5
Nick Anderson	SG	63	61	2,163	304	182	120	32	757	34.3	4.8	2.9	1.9	.5	12.0
Penny Hardaway	PG	59	59	2,221	263	332	93	35	1,210	37.6	4.5	5.6	1.6	.6	20.5
Danny Schayes	PF	45	6	540	125	14	15	16	133	12.0	2.8	.3	.3	.4	3.0
David Vaughn III	PF	35	6	298	95	7	8	15	81	8.5	2.7	.2	.2	.4	2.3
Amal McCaskill	C	17	1	109	22	7	3	5	28	6.4	1.3	.4	.2	.3	1.6
Brian Evans	SF	14	0	59	8	7	1	2	20	4.2	.6	.5	.1	.1	1.4
Kenny Smith^{†}	PG	6	0	47	2	4	0	0	17	7.8	.3	.7	.0	.0	2.8
Dell Demps	SG	2	0	10	0	0	1	0	2	5.0	.0	.0	.5	.0	1.0
Donald Royal^{†}	SF	1	1	29	1	1	0	0	12	29.0	1.0	1.0	.0	.0	12.0
Felton Spencer^{†}	C	1	1	19	6	1	0	0	4	19.0	6.0	1.0	.0	.0	4.0

- ^{†} Denotes player spent time with another team in the season. Stats reflect time with the Magic only.

=== Playoffs ===
Player	POS	GP	GS	MP	REB	AST	STL	BLK	PTS	MPG	RPG	APG	SPG	BPG	PPG
Penny Hardaway	PG	5	5	220	30	17	12	7	155	44.0	6.0	3.4	2.4	1.4	31.0
Derek Strong	PF	5	5	195	50	4	2	2	61	39.0	10.0	.8	.4	.4	12.2
Nick Anderson	SG	5	5	130	29	3	3	9	28	26.0	5.8	.6	.6	1.8	5.6
Brian Shaw	PG	5	4	82	9	8	1	1	10	16.4	1.8	1.6	.2	.2	2.0
Danny Schayes	PF	5	2	92	12	5	2	1	22	18.4	2.4	1.0	.4	.2	4.4
Dennis Scott	SF	5	1	94	9	5	2	0	15	18.8	1.8	1.0	.4	.0	3.0
Gerald Wilkins	SG	5	0	144	9	4	0	2	47	28.8	1.8	.8	.0	.4	9.4
Darrell Armstrong	PG	5	0	143	21	17	8	1	57	28.6	4.2	3.4	1.6	.2	11.4
Rony Seikaly	C	3	3	86	16	0	1	3	19	28.7	5.3	.0	.3	1.0	6.3
Amal McCaskill	C	2	0	7	3	1	0	0	5	3.5	1.5	.5	.0	.0	2.5
Brian Evans	SF	2	0	7	0	2	1	0	2	3.5	.0	1.0	.5	.0	1.0

== Awards and honors ==
- Penny Hardaway – All-NBA Third Team, All-Star
