= Dennis Scott (basketball) =

American basketball player (born 1968)

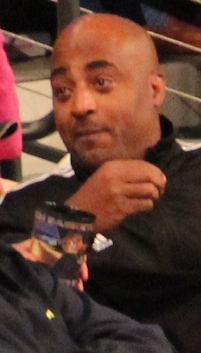
- Scott in 2013

Personal information
- Born: September 5, 1968 (age 58) Hagerstown, Maryland, U.S.
- Listed height: 6 ft 8 in (2.03 m)
- Listed weight: 229 lb (104 kg)

Career information
- High school: Flint Hill (Oakton, Virginia)
- College: Georgia Tech (1987–1990)
- NBA draft: 1990: 1st round, 4th overall pick
- Drafted by: Orlando Magic
- Playing career: 1990–2000
- Position: Small forward
- Number: 3, 4, 7, 9

Career history
- 1990–1997: Orlando Magic
- 1997–1998: Dallas Mavericks
- 1998: Phoenix Suns
- 1999: New York Knicks
- 1999: Minnesota Timberwolves
- 1999–2000: Vancouver Grizzlies

Career highlights
- NBA All-Rookie First Team (1991); Sporting News College Player of the Year (1990); Consensus second-team All-American (1990); ACC Player of the Year (1990); ACC Rookie of the Year (1988); First-team All-ACC (1990); No. 4 retired by Georgia Tech Yellow Jackets; Naismith Prep Player of the Year (1987); McDonald's All-American (1987); First-team Parade All-American (1987); Second-team Parade All-American (1986); Third-team Parade All-American (1985)

Career NBA statistics
- Points: 8,094 (12.9 ppg)
- Assists: 1,296 (2.1 apg)
- Rebounds: 1,774 (2.8 rpg)
- Stats at NBA.com
- Stats at Basketball Reference

Dennis Eugene Scott Jr. (born September 5, 1968) is an American former professional basketball player. A 6 ft 8 in (2.03 m) small forward from Georgia Tech, and the 1990 ACC Men's Basketball Player of the Year, Scott was selected by the Orlando Magic with the fourth pick of the 1990 NBA draft after being the leading scorer on a Yellow Jackets team that made the Final Four, and comprising one portion of Georgia Tech's "Lethal Weapon 3" attack featuring Scott, Kenny Anderson and Brian Oliver.

== Basketball career ==
=== High school ===
Scott played for Coach Stu Vetter at Flint Hill in Oakton, Virginia. Flint Hill Prep finished ranked first in the nation Scott's senior year (1987) as ranked by USA Today. In his junior year at Flint Hill Prep, his team finished ranked second in the nation by USA Today and first as ranked by Blue Ribbon yearbook. Given his size, strength, shooting ability, and quickness Scott played every position at one time or another during his high school career.

=== College career ===
Scott had an excellent college career for the Yellow Jackets, leading them to the NCAA Tournament each year that he played. During his junior season, 1989–90, he led the Yellow Jackets on to win the ACC Tournament Championship. He was named ACC Player of the Year. He also led the team to the Final Four of the NCAA Tournament that season, falling to eventual champion, UNLV. He entered the NBA Draft after his junior season, foregoing his senior year. In 2002, Scott was named to the ACC 50th Anniversary men's basketball team honoring the 50 greatest players in ACC History.

=== NBA career ===
==== Orlando Magic ====
Scott spent the majority of his career with the Magic, earning the nickname 3-D for his ability to consistently make long three-point field goal attempts. Until the drafting of Shaquille O'Neal in 1992, Scott and Nick Anderson were the leading scorers for the Magic. In 1995–96 Scott set an NBA single-season three-point field goal tally with 267 (which was broken ten years later by Ray Allen). He also set the then NBA record for most three-pointers made in a single game, with 11 on April 18, 1996. On his record-breaking shot, the assist came from teammate and the holder of the record, Brian Shaw (he made 10 three-pointers on April 8, 1993). This record was subsequently broken by Kobe Bryant who made 12 three-pointers on January 7, 2003. Klay Thompson now owns the record after making 14 baskets from behind the arc against the Chicago Bulls on October 29, 2018.

Scott was involved in a controversy after an incident at a Virginia summer camp in which he ranted and played explicit rap music in front of a crowd of bewildered children in 1997.

Scott was honored by the Magic on March 26, 2006, as part of their "Remember the Past Nights" program, where the Magic remembers past players for their accomplishments. Other players to be honored so far were Nick Anderson and Scott Skiles. In 2008, Jay Bilas ranked his personal shooters in NCAA history and Scott was #1 on his list.

==== Rest of career ====
In addition to his seven-year career with Orlando, Scott also spent short stints with other teams. On September 24, 1997, he was traded to the Dallas Mavericks for Derek Harper and Ed O'Bannon. Scott had been traded to the Mavericks after a tumultuous off-season where Scott, frustrated over playing for the Magic as well as with the Magic organization, had a meltdown at a summer camp event for children he was a guest at, blaring music with explicit lyrics and throwing thinly veiled insults at the Magic organization. Midway through the 1997–98 season, the Mavericks traded Scott to the Phoenix Suns for Cedric Ceballos. He also played for the New York Knicks, Minnesota Timberwolves (1998–99) and the Vancouver Grizzlies (1999–2000). Scott did not play in the 2000–01 NBA season after being cut by the Washington Wizards in training camp. In 2001, he attempted an NBA comeback with the Los Angeles Lakers (with ex-Orlando teammates Shaquille O'Neal and Brian Shaw) but due to the abundance of veteran talent already on the roster, the Lakers decided to go with another player and cut Scott after training camp.

== Post-playing career ==
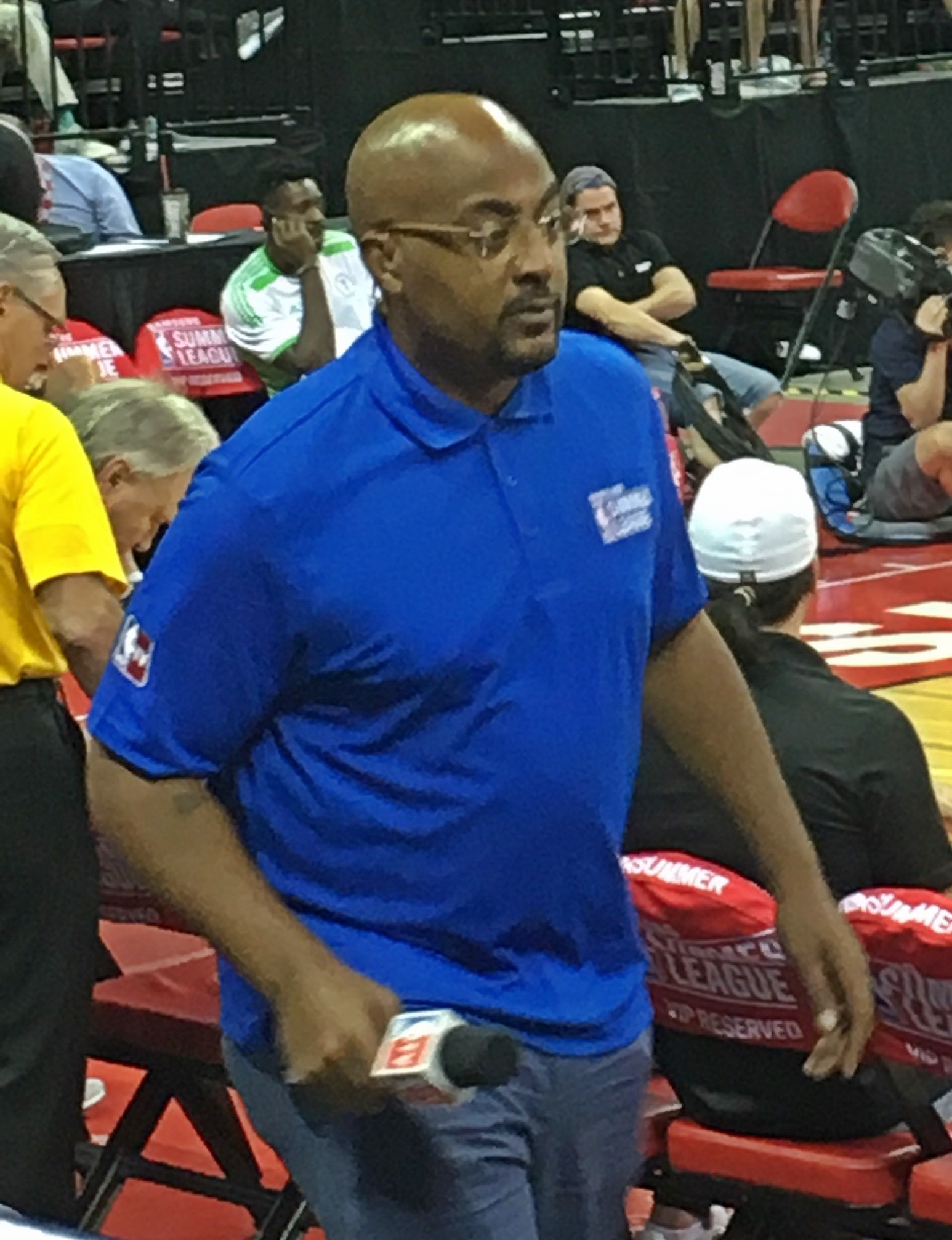
Scott working with NBA TV

Currently Scott serves as a commentator for TNT Sports.

Scott has also served as general manager of the Atlanta Vision of the American Basketball Association.

== Personal Life ==
Scott previously dated Gizelle Bryant star on the reality TV show Real Housewives of Potomac. During their relationship he accompanied her to her high school prom.

Scott later married Rachael, with whom he has four children. The family resides in Atlanta,Georgia.

== NBA career statistics ==
A list of Scott's career statistics:

Legend
GP	Games played	GS	Games started	MPG	Minutes per game
FG%	Field goal percentage	3P%	3-point field goal percentage	FT%	Free throw percentage
RPG	Rebounds per game	APG	Assists per game	SPG	Steals per game
BPG	Blocks per game	PPG	Points per game	**Bold**	Career high
*	Led the league

=== Regular season ===
Year	Team	GP	GS	MPG	FG%	3P%	FT%	RPG	APG	SPG	BPG	PPG
1990–91	Orlando	**82**	73	28.5	.425	.374	.750	2.9	1.6	0.8	.3	15.7
1991–92	Orlando	18	15	33.8	.402	.326	**.901**	3.7	1.9	**1.1**	.5	**19.9**
1992–93	Orlando	54	43	32.6	.431	.403	.786	3.4	2.5	**1.1**	.3	15.9
1993–94	Orlando	**82**	37	27.8	.405	.399	.774	2.7	2.6	1.0	.4	12.8
1994–95	Orlando	62	10	24.2	.439	.426	.754	2.4	2.1	0.7	.2	12.9
1995–96	Orlando	**82**	**82***	**37.1**	.440	.425	.820	**3.8**	**3.0**	**1.1**	.4	17.5
1996–97	Orlando	66	62	32.8	.398	.394	.792	3.1	2.1	**1.1**	.3	12.5
1997–98	Dallas	52	42	34.6	.387	.344	.822	**3.8**	2.5	0.8	**.6**	13.6
1997–98	Phoenix	29	3	17.0	.438	**.449**	.667	1.7	0.8	0.3	.2	6.2
1998–99	New York	15	0	13.7	.304	.276	.250	1.3	0.5	0.2	.1	2.9
1998–99	Minnesota	21	9	25.3	**.446**	.426	.815	1.8	1.5	0.6	.1	9.1
1999–2000	Vancouver	66	0	19.1	.375	.376	.842	1.6	1.0	0.4	.1	5.6
Career		629	376	28.6	.417	.397	.793	2.8	2.1	0.8	.3	12.9

=== Playoffs ===
Year	Team	GP	GS	MPG	FG%	3P%	FT%	RPG	APG	SPG	BPG	PPG
1994	Orlando	3	3	33.0	.341	.318	.800	2.0	1.0	0.7	**1.0**	14.3
1995	Orlando	**21**	**15**	35.5	.413	.371	**.850**	3.0	**2.1**	**1.0**	.2	**14.7**
1996	Orlando	12	12	**37.2**	**.414**	**.377**	.636	**3.6**	1.9	0.8	.1	11.3
1997	Orlando	5	1	18.8	.261	.273	.000	1.8	1.0	0.4	.0	3.0
1998	Phoenix	4	0	15.5	.412	.375	.000	2.0	0.3	0.3	.0	4.3
Career		45	31	32.2	.399	.364	.778	2.9	1.7	0.8	.2	11.5

== See also ==
- List of NBA single-game 3-point field goal leaders
