= Anthony Avent =

American basketball player (born 1969)

Personal information
- Born: October 18, 1969 (age 57) Rocky Mount, North Carolina, U.S.
- Listed height: 6 ft 9 in (2.06 m)
- Listed weight: 235 lb (107 kg)

Career information
- High school: Malcolm X Shabazz (Newark, New Jersey)
- College: Seton Hall (1988–1991)
- NBA draft: 1991: 1st round, 15th overall pick
- Drafted by: Atlanta Hawks
- Playing career: 1991–2001
- Position: Power forward
- Number: 00, 34, 54, 30

Career history
- 1991–1992: Phonola Caserta
- 1992–1994: Milwaukee Bucks
- 1994–1995: Orlando Magic
- 1995–1996: Vancouver Grizzlies
- 1996–1997: Panathinaikos BC
- 1997–1998: Sioux Falls Skyforce
- 1999: Utah Jazz
- 1999–2000: Los Angeles Clippers
- 2000–2001: PAOK Thessaloniki

Career highlights
- Second-team All-Big East (1991)

Career NBA statistics
- Points: 1,958 (5.6 ppg)
- Rebounds: 1,584 (4.5 rpg)
- Blocks: 211 (0.6 bpg)
- Stats at NBA.com
- Stats at Basketball Reference

Anthony Avent (born October 18, 1969) is an American former professional basketball player who was selected by the Atlanta Hawks in the first round (15th pick overall) of the 1991 NBA draft. Born in Rocky Mount, North Carolina, Avent played for the Milwaukee Bucks, Orlando Magic, Vancouver Grizzlies, Utah Jazz and Los Angeles Clippers in six NBA seasons. He played collegiately at Seton Hall University where he played in the 1989 NCAA championship game. Prior to Seton Hall, Avent played at Malcolm X Shabazz High School in Newark, New Jersey.

Upon being drafted 15th overall by the Bucks, Avent went on to instead sign with Phonola Caserta of the Italian League. He made this decision after failing to reach a satisfactory contract with the Bucks. After one season in Italy, Avent signed a four-year deal with the Bucks, beginning with a $500,000 installment in his first season and increasing in $150,000 increments in each of the succeeding three seasons. Thus, Avent made $950,000 in the fourth year of his contract.

In the 1996–97 season he played in several games for the Greek team Panathinaikos, and in 2001 he played for PAOK BC.

== NBA career statistics ==
Legend
GP	Games played	GS	Games started	MPG	Minutes per game
FG%	Field goal percentage	3P%	3-point field goal percentage	FT%	Free throw percentage
RPG	Rebounds per game	APG	Assists per game	SPG	Steals per game
BPG	Blocks per game	PPG	Points per game	**Bold**	Career high

=== Regular season ===
Year	Team	GP	GS	MPG	FG%	3P%	FT%	RPG	APG	SPG	BPG	PPG
1992–93	Milwaukee	**82**	**78**	**27.9**	**.433**	.000	.651	**6.2**	**1.1**	**0.7**	**0.9**	**9.8**
1993–94	Milwaukee	33	20	21.1	.404	.000	**.772**	4.7	1.0	0.5	0.6	7.4
1993–94	Orlando	41	20	16.5	.341	.000	.636	4.5	0.8	0.4	0.3	3.5
1994–95	Orlando	71	3	15.0	.430	.000	.640	4.1	0.6	0.4	0.7	3.6
1995–96	Vancouver	71	32	22.3	.384	.000	.740	5.0	1.0	0.4	0.6	5.8
1998–99	Utah	5	0	8.8	.308	.000	.500	2.4	0.2	0.4	0.0	1.8
1999–00	Los Angeles	49	3	7.7	.302	.000	.719	1.5	0.2	0.3	0.3	1.7
Career		352	156	19.1	.403	.000	.686	4.5	0.8	0.5	0.6	5.6

=== Playoffs ===
Year	Team	GP	GS	MPG	FG%	3P%	FT%	RPG	APG	SPG	BPG	PPG
1993–94	Orlando	2	0	**20.0**	**.462**	.000	**.875**	**5.5**	**0.5**	**0.0**	0.0	**9.5**
1994–95	Orlando	**7**	0	5.7	.429	.000	.750	1.1	0.0	0.0	**0.1**	1.3
Career		9	0	8.9	.450	.000	.833	2.1	0.1	0.0	0.1	3.1
