= Keith Tower =

American basketball player

Personal information
- Born: May 15, 1970 (age 56) Libby, Montana, U.S.
- Listed height: 6 ft 11 in (2.11 m)
- Listed weight: 250 lb (113 kg)

Career information
- High school: Moon (Coraopolis, Pennsylvania)
- College: Notre Dame (1988–1992)
- NBA draft: 1992: undrafted
- Playing career: 1992–2002
- Position: Center
- Number: 51, 55

Career history
- 1992–1993: Columbus Horizon
- 1993–1994: Orlando Magic
- 1994–1995: Atenas Córdoba
- 1995–1996: Los Angeles Clippers
- 1996: Milwaukee Bucks
- 1996–1997: Fort Wayne Fury
- 1997: La Crosse Bobcats
- 1997–1998: NKK Sea Hawks
- 1998: Śląsk Wrocław
- 1998–1999: Cantabria Lobos
- 2001–2002: Indiana Legends
- Stats at NBA.com
- Stats at Basketball Reference

Keith Raymond Tower (born May 15, 1970) is an American former professional basketball player.

A 6'11" center from Libby, Montana and the University of Notre Dame, Tower was never drafted by an NBA team but did manage to play in four NBA seasons from 1993 to 1997. He played for the Orlando Magic, Los Angeles Clippers and Milwaukee Bucks. In his NBA career, Tower played in 53 games and scored a total of 98 points.

Tower is the co-founder and senior pastor of HighPoint Church, with former NBA player Andrew DeClercq. Coincidentally, both players wore No. 55 during their careers.

== Career statistics ==
Legend
GP	Games played	GS	Games started	MPG	Minutes per game
FG%	Field goal percentage	3P%	3-point field goal percentage	FT%	Free throw percentage
RPG	Rebounds per game	APG	Assists per game	SPG	Steals per game
BPG	Blocks per game	PPG	Points per game	**Bold**	Career high

=== NBA ===
Year	Team	GP	GS	MPG	FG%	3P%	FT%	RPG	APG	SPG	BPG	PPG
1993–94	Orlando	11	0	2.9	**.444**	.000	.000	0.5	0.1	0.0	0.0	0.7
1994–95	Orlando	3	0	2.3	.000	.000	.500	1.0	0.0	0.0	0.0	0.3
1995–96	Los Angeles	**34**	**1**	9.0	**.444**	.000	**.692**	1.5	0.1	0.1	**0.3**	**2.4**
1996–97	Milwaukee	5	**1**	**14.4**	.375	.000	.125	**1.8**	**0.2**	**0.4**	0.2	1.4
Career		53	2	7.8	.429	.000	.556	1.3	0.1	0.1	0.2	1.8

=== College ===
Year	Team	GP	GS	MPG	FG%	3P%	FT%	RPG	APG	SPG	BPG	PPG
1988–89	Notre Dame	29	**5**	11.3	**.560**	.000	.455	2.8	0.3	0.1	0.6	2.4
1989–90	Notre Dame	25	-	11.0	.311	.000	.600	2.7	0.2	0.2	0.2	2.1
1990–91	Notre Dame	**32**	-	**30.3**	.464	.000	**.632**	**7.0**	**1.7**	**0.6**	0.6	**7.9**
1991–92	Notre Dame	31	-	25.0	.396	.000	.545	5.3	1.4	0.5	**0.8**	4.3
Career		117	5	20.1	.434	.000	.573	4.6	0.9	0.4	0.6	4.4
