= Derek Strong =

American basketball player (born 1968)

Personal information
- Born: February 9, 1968 (age 58) Los Angeles, California, U.S.
- Listed height: 6 ft 8 in (2.03 m)
- Listed weight: 220 lb (100 kg)

Career information
- High school: Pacific Palisades (Los Angeles, California)
- College: Xavier (1987–1990)
- NBA draft: 1990: 2nd round, 47th overall pick
- Drafted by: Philadelphia 76ers
- Playing career: 1990–2003
- Position: Power forward
- Number: 35, 20, 31, 7, 33, 30

Career history
- 1990–1991: Huesca La Magia
- 1991: Miami Tropics
- 1992: Washington Bullets
- 1992–1993: Quad City Thunder
- 1993–1994: Milwaukee Bucks
- 1994–1995: Boston Celtics
- 1995–1996: Los Angeles Lakers
- 1996–2000: Orlando Magic
- 2000–2001: Los Angeles Clippers
- 2002–2003: Columbus Riverdragons

Career highlights
- CBA Most Valuable Player (1993); All-CBA First Team (1993); CBA All-Defensive Team (1993); CBA Newcomer of the Year (1993); Second-team All-MCC (1990)

Career NBA statistics
- Points: 3,088 (6.8 ppg)
- Rebounds: 2,213 (4.9 rpg)
- Assists: 291 (0.6 apg)
- Stats at NBA.com
- Stats at Basketball Reference

Derek Lamar Strong (born February 9, 1968) is an American former professional basketball player who played in ten National Basketball Association (NBA) seasons from 1991 to 2001 for six different teams. A 6'8" power forward from Xavier University, Strong was selected by the Philadelphia 76ers in the second round (47th pick overall) of the 1990 NBA draft. Strong has successfully transitioned into stock car racing.

== Professional basketball career ==
Strong played for the Washington Bullets, Milwaukee Bucks, Boston Celtics, Los Angeles Lakers, Orlando Magic and Los Angeles Clippers.

In his NBA career, Strong played in 456 games and scored a total of 3,088 points. His best year as a professional came during the 1997–98 season as a member of the Magic, appearing in 58 games and averaging 12.7 ppg.

Strong played for the Quad City Thunder of the Continental Basketball Association (CBA) during the 1992–93 season. He was selected as the CBA Most Valuable Player and Newcomer of the Year, and named to the All-CBA First Team and All-Defensive Team.

== Career statistics ==
Legend
GP	Games played	GS	Games started	MPG	Minutes per game
FG%	Field goal percentage	3P%	3-point field goal percentage	FT%	Free throw percentage
RPG	Rebounds per game	APG	Assists per game	SPG	Steals per game
BPG	Blocks per game	PPG	Points per game	**Bold**	Career high

=== NBA ===
==== Regular season ====
Year	Team	GP	GS	MPG	FG%	3P%	FT%	RPG	APG	SPG	BPG	PPG
1991–92	Washington	1	0	12.0	.000	.000	.750	5.0	**1.0**	0.0	0.0	3.0
1992–93	Milwaukee	23	0	14.7	**.457**	**.500**	.800	5.0	0.6	0.5	0.0	6.8
1993–94	Milwaukee	67	11	16.9	.413	.231	.772	4.2	0.7	**0.6**	0.2	6.6
1994–95	Boston	70	**24**	19.2	.453	.286	**.820**	5.4	0.6	0.3	0.2	6.3
1995–96	L.A. Lakers	63	0	11.8	.426	.111	.812	2.8	0.5	0.3	0.2	3.4
1996–97	Orlando	**82**	21	24.4	.447	.000	.803	6.3	0.9	**0.6**	0.2	8.5
1997–98	Orlando	58	8	**28.2**	.420	.000	.781	**7.4**	0.9	0.5	**0.4**	**12.7**
1998–99	Orlando	44	0	15.8	.422	.000	.717	3.7	0.4	0.3	0.2	5.1
1999–00	Orlando	20	0	7.4	.438	.250	.786	2.2	0.2	0.3	0.1	2.7
2000–01	L.A. Clippers	28	8	17.5	.385	.000	.757	3.9	0.3	0.5	0.0	4.2
Career		456	72	18.7	.430	.180	.786	4.9	0.6	0.4	0.2	6.8

==== Playoffs ====
Year	Team	GP	GS	MPG	FG%	3P%	FT%	RPG	APG	SPG	BPG	PPG
1994–95	Boston	4	1	20.3	.333	.000	.500	6.0	**0.8**	0.8	0.3	2.8
1996–97	Orlando	**5**	**5**	**39.0**	**.525**	.000	.760	**10.0**	**0.8**	0.4	**0.4**	**12.2**
1998–99	Orlando	1	0	16.0	.500	.000	**1.000**	0.0	0.0	**1.0**	0.0	4.0
Career		10	6	29.2	.481	.000	.727	7.4	0.7	0.6	0.3	7.6

=== College ===
Year	Team	GP	GS	MPG	FG%	3P%	FT%	RPG	APG	SPG	BPG	PPG
1987–88	Xavier	30	-	22.3	.569	.000	.718	7.1	0.8	0.7	0.4	10.6
1988–89	Xavier	**33**	**31**	**29.8**	**.617**	.000	.817	8.0	0.5	**0.8**	0.5	**15.3**
1989–90	Xavier	**33**	**31**	29.7	.533	.000	**.839**	**9.9**	**0.9**	**0.8**	**0.8**	14.2
Career		96	62	27.4	.573	.000	.802	8.4	0.7	0.8	0.6	13.4

== NASCAR career ==
During his tenure in the NBA, Derek was an avid NASCAR fan and remained committed to pursuing this childhood dream when his playing days ended. Strong transitioned into a professional stock car driver and owner of Strong Racing Team Derek is the first NBA player to successfully transition into stock car racing. Strong Racing is the first team in NASCAR history to have African-American female owners – Dawn Whitaker and Erika Hill. Strong Racing is a Stock Car Racing Team that competes in ASA and NASCAR Racing events. Strong Racing is managed by Stuart Lycett and is based in Los Angeles.

== Charities ==
Strong supports many charities including The Music City Motorsports Institute, a non-profit associated with Strong Racing that seeks to motivate and inspire students to achieve academic success with an educational platform of learning, discovery and fun in the motor sports industry. Co-owner of Strong Racing, Erika Hill is also the co-founder of Peace International, a non-profit organization whose primary mission is to build schools in remote areas throughout the world.
