= Jeff Turner =

American basketball player and broadcasting announcer

Personal information
- Born: April 9, 1962 (age 64) Bangor, Maine, U.S.
- Listed height: 6 ft 9 in (2.06 m)
- Listed weight: 230 lb (104 kg)

Career information
- High school: Brandon (Brandon, Florida)
- College: Vanderbilt (1980–1984)
- NBA draft: 1984: 1st round, 17th overall pick
- Drafted by: New Jersey Nets
- Playing career: 1984–1996
- Position: Power forward
- Number: 35, 30, 31

Career history
- 1984–1987: New Jersey Nets
- 1986–1989: Pallacanestro Cantù
- 1989–1996: Orlando Magic

Career highlights
- First-team All-SEC – AP, Coaches (1984); Second-team All-SEC – UPI (1984)
- Stats at NBA.com
- Stats at Basketball Reference
Medals
Men's basketball
Representing the United States
Olympic Games
Gold medal – first place	1984 Los Angeles	Team competition
World Championships
Silver medal – second place	1982 Colombia	Team competition

Jeffrey Steven Turner (born April 9, 1962) is an American former professional basketball player and broadcasting announcer. Turner played ten NBA seasons (1984–1987; 1989–1996), spending time with the New Jersey Nets as well as the Orlando Magic. He ended his NBA career with 3,697 career points. Turner was a 6' 9" forward/center. After his career ended he spent nine years as a radio color commentator for the Magic. He then served as the head boys basketball coach at Lake Highland Preparatory School in Orlando, Florida from to 2005 to 2013, where he compiled a 151–72 record and won the state title in 2013. From 2011 to 2013 he was also a studio analyst for Magic games. In 2013, Turner was named television color commentator for the Magic.

== Basketball career ==
Turner starred as a college player for Vanderbilt University. He was selected by the New Jersey Nets with the 17th pick of the 1984 NBA draft.

Turner was a member of the Gold Medal 1984 U.S. Olympic basketball team coached by Bobby Knight. The team included Michael Jordan, Patrick Ewing, Wayman Tisdale and Chris Mullin. Turner also played for the US national team in the 1982 FIBA World Championship, winning the silver medal.

== Imposter ==
On June 4, 2008, the Associated Press reported that Ronnie Craven of Somerville, Massachusetts, had been posing as Turner and using the identity to facilitate sexual encounters with women he met in online chat rooms. His ruse also included the additional falsehood that "Jeff Turner" was employed in the front office of the Seattle SuperSonics (Turner has never worked for the Sonics). Craven says he has received a cease-and-desist order from a lawyer for the Sonics. Craven said he was embarrassed and would stop lying about his identity.

== Career statistics ==
Legend
GP	Games played	GS	Games started	MPG	Minutes per game
FG%	Field goal percentage	3P%	3-point field goal percentage	FT%	Free throw percentage
RPG	Rebounds per game	APG	Assists per game	SPG	Steals per game
BPG	Blocks per game	PPG	Points per game	**Bold**	Career high

=== NBA ===
==== Regular season ====
Year	Team	GP	GS	MPG	FG%	3P%	FT%	RPG	APG	SPG	BPG	PPG
1984–85	New Jersey	72	36	19.8	.454	.000	.859	3.0	**1.5**	**.4**	.1	5.8
1985–86	New Jersey	53	1	12.3	.491	.000	.744	2.6	.3	**.4**	.1	4.3
1986–87	New Jersey	**76**	22	13.2	.465	.000	.731	2.6	.8	**.4**	**.2**	5.0
1989–90	Orlando	60	15	18.4	.429	.200	.778	3.8	.9	**.4**	**.2**	5.1
1990–91	Orlando	71	43	**23.7**	.487	.400	.759	**5.1**	1.4	**.4**	.1	**8.6**
1991–92	Orlando	75	42	21.2	.451	.125	.693	3.3	1.2	.3	**.2**	7.1
1992–93	Orlando	75	20	19.7	**.529**	**.588**	.800	3.4	1.4	.3	.1	7.0
1993–94	Orlando	68	**51**	22.6	.467	.327	.778	4.0	.9	.3	**.2**	6.8
1994–95	Orlando	49	5	11.8	.410	.360	.897	2.0	.8	.2	.1	4.1
1995–96	Orlando	13	0	14.8	.353	.333	**1.000**	2.2	.5	.2	.1	3.6
Career		612	235	18.4	.467	.344	.769	3.3	1.0	.4	.1	6.0

==== Playoffs ====
Year	Team	GP	GS	MPG	FG%	3P%	FT%	RPG	APG	SPG	BPG	PPG
1985	New Jersey	3	0	7.0	.400	–	–	1.3	.7	.0	.0	1.3
1986	New Jersey	3	0	6.0	.333	–	**1.000**	1.0	**1.0**	.0	.0	1.0
1995	Orlando	**18**	0	**9.9**	**.425**	**.500**	**1.000**	**1.4**	.6	**.2**	**.2**	**2.7**
Career		24	0	9.1	.417	.500	1.000	1.3	.7	.2	.1	2.3

== See also ==
- Vanderbilt Commodores men's basketball
