= 1994–95 Orlando Magic season =

NBA professional basketball team season

- Conference champions
- Division champions
- Head coach: Brian Hill
- President: Bob Vander Weide
- General manager: Pat Williams
- Owner: Richard DeVos
- Arena: Orlando Arena

Results
- Record: 57–25 (.695)
- Place: Division: 1st (Atlantic); Conference: 1st (Eastern)
- Playoff finish: NBA Finals (lost to Rockets 0–4)
- Stats at Basketball Reference

Local media
- Television: WKCF; Sunshine Network
- Radio: WDBO

The 1994–95 Orlando Magic season was the sixth season for the Orlando Magic in the National Basketball Association.

== Season summary ==
=== Off-season ===
After building through the NBA draft in the previous years, the Magic made themselves even stronger by signing free agents Horace Grant, who won three NBA championships with the Chicago Bulls from 1991 to 1993, and Brian Shaw during the off-season.

For the season, the Magic revealed new blue road uniforms which featured white pinstripes, a black and white trim, and the city name "Orlando" on the front of their jerseys; meanwhile, the team's black pinstriped jerseys became their alternate uniforms. Both uniforms would remain in use until 1998.

=== Regular season ===
With the addition of Grant and Shaw, the Magic got off to a 2–2 start to the regular season, but then posted a nine-game winning streak between November and December afterwards. The team won 26 of their first 32 games of the season, and later on held a 37–10 record at the All-Star break. Despite losing seven of their final eleven games of the season in April, the Magic won the Atlantic Division title with a 57–25 record, earning the first seed in the Eastern Conference, and qualifying for their second NBA playoff appearance; the team also finished with a 39–2 home record at the Orlando Arena, which was tied for second-best in NBA history.

Shaquille O'Neal continued to dominate the NBA by averaging 29.3 points, 11.4 rebounds and 2.4 blocks per game, and was named to the All-NBA Second Team, while second-year star Penny Hardaway averaged 20.9 points, 7.2 assists and 1.7 steals per game, and was named to the All-NBA First Team, and Grant provided the team with 12.8 points and 9.7 rebounds per game, and was named to the NBA All-Defensive Second Team. In addition, Nick Anderson contributed 15.8 points, 4.1 assists and 1.6 steals per game, and led the Magic with 179 three-point field goals, while three-point specialist Dennis Scott played a sixth man role off the bench, averaging 12.9 points per game and contributing 150 three-point field goals, and Donald Royal provided with 9.1 points and 4.0 rebounds per game as the team's starting small forward. Also off the bench, Shaw contributed 6.4 points and 5.2 assists per game, while Anthony Bowie contributed 5.5 points per game, and Anthony Avent averaged 3.6 points and 4.1 rebounds per game.

During the NBA All-Star weekend at the America West Arena in Phoenix, Arizona, O'Neal and Hardaway were both selected for the 1995 NBA All-Star Game, as members of the Eastern Conference All-Star team, while head coach Brian Hill was selected to coach the Eastern Conference; it was Hardaway's first ever All-Star appearance. Meanwhile, Anderson participated in the NBA Three-Point Shootout. O'Neal also finished in second place in Most Valuable Player voting, behind David Robinson of the San Antonio Spurs, while Hardaway finished in tenth place, and Scott finished in fifth place in Sixth Man of the Year voting.

The Magic finished 15th in the NBA in home-game attendance, with an attendance of 656,410 at the Orlando Arena during the regular season.

=== NBA playoffs ===
In the Eastern Conference First Round of the 1995 NBA playoffs, the Magic faced off against the 8th–seeded Boston Celtics, a team that featured All-Star forward Dominique Wilkins, second-year star Dino Radja, and Dee Brown. The Magic won Game 1 over the Celtics at home by a 47-point margin, 124–77 at the Orlando Arena; however, the Magic lost Game 2 to the Celtics at home, 99–92, which tied the series at 1–1. The Magic won the next two games on the road, which included a Game 4 win over the Celtics at the Boston Garden, 95–92 to win the series in four games; Game 4 would be the final basketball game ever played at the Boston Garden. Coincidentally, O'Neal would play his final game in Boston sixteen years later with the 2010–11 Boston Celtics, before retiring from the NBA at the age of 39.

In the Eastern Conference Semi-finals, the Magic faced off against the 5th–seeded Chicago Bulls, who were led by All-Star guard Michael Jordan, All-Star forward Scottie Pippen, and second-year star Toni Kukoč. The Bulls were on an emotional high as Jordan had just come out of his retirement, and returned from his baseball career to play basketball; Jordan was now wearing number 45 for the Bulls, as his number 23 jersey was retired.

The Magic won Game 1 over the Bulls at the Orlando Arena, 94–91, which featured Anderson stealing the ball from Jordan during the fourth quarter. Tensions rose when Anderson indicated that Jordan was no longer the same player; Anderson was quoted by the media saying, "No. 45 doesn't explode like No. 23 used to. No. 23, he could just blow by you. He took off like a space shuttle. No. 45, he revs up, but he really doesn't take off." The comment motivated Jordan to change back to number 23, which caused controversy for the Bulls; in Game 2, Jordan scored 38 points as the Bulls defeated the Magic by a score of 104–94 to even the series. With the series tied at 2–2, the Magic won Game 5 at the Orlando Arena, 103–95, and then won Game 6 over the Bulls on the road, 108–102 at the United Center to win the series in six games, and advance to their first Conference Finals appearance.

In the Eastern Conference Finals, the Magic then faced off against the 2nd–seeded, and Central Division champion Indiana Pacers, who were led by All-Star guard Reggie Miller, Rik Smits and Mark Jackson. The Magic took a 3–2 series lead before losing Game 6 to the Pacers on the road, 123–96 at the Market Square Arena. With the series tied at 3–3, the Magic won Game 7 over the Pacers at the Orlando Arena, 105–81 to win in a hard-fought seven-game series; the home team won every game in this series. The Magic then advanced to the NBA Finals for the first time in franchise history.

In the 1995 NBA Finals, the Magic faced off against the 6th–seeded, and defending NBA champion Houston Rockets, a team that featured All-Star center Hakeem Olajuwon, All-Star guard Clyde Drexler, and Robert Horry; O'Neal would be up against Olajuwon in a battle of All-Star centers. In Game 1 at the Orlando Arena, Anderson missed four consecutive free throws with the Magic up by three points at the waning seconds of the game, and the Rockets tied the game at the buzzer; the Rockets went on to win the game in overtime, 120–118. The Magic were unable to recover from their Game 1 loss, as the team lost Game 2 to the Rockets at home, 117–106, and then lost the next two games on the road, including a Game 4 loss to the Rockets at The Summit, 113–101. The Magic lost the series in a four-game sweep, as the Rockets won their second consecutive NBA championship.

=== Aftermath ===
Following the season, Avent was traded to the Vancouver Grizzlies expansion team, and Tree Rollins retired. The Magic would not advance to the NBA Finals again until the 2008–09 season.

== Draft picks ==
Round	Pick	Player	Position	Nationality	College / Team
1	27	Brooks Thompson	PG	United States	Oklahoma State
2	31	Rodney Dent	C	United States	Kentucky

== Roster ==
1994–95 Orlando Magic roster
Players

Pos.	No.	Player	Height	Weight	DOB	From
G/F	25	Nick Anderson	6 ft 6 in (1.98 m)	205 lb (93 kg)	1968–01–20	Illinois
G	10	Darrell Armstrong	6 ft 0 in (1.83 m)	170 lb (77 kg)	1968–06–22	Fayetteville State
F	00	Anthony Avent	6 ft 9 in (2.06 m)	235 lb (107 kg)	1969–10–18	Seton Hall
G	14	Anthony Bowie	6 ft 6 in (1.98 m)	190 lb (86 kg)	1963–11–09	Oklahoma
F	54	Horace Grant	6 ft 10 in (2.08 m)	215 lb (98 kg)	1965–07–04	Clemson
C	43	Geert Hammink	7 ft 0 in (2.13 m)	262 lb (119 kg)	1969–07–12	LSU
G	1	Penny Hardaway	6 ft 7 in (2.01 m)	195 lb (88 kg)	1971–07–18	Memphis
C	32	Shaquille O'Neal	7 ft 1 in (2.16 m)	325 lb (147 kg)	1972–03–06	LSU
C	30	Tree Rollins	7 ft 1 in (2.16 m)	235 lb (107 kg)	1955–06–16	Clemson
F	5	Donald Royal	6 ft 8 in (2.03 m)	210 lb (95 kg)	1966–05–22	Notre Dame
F	3	Dennis Scott	6 ft 8 in (2.03 m)	229 lb (104 kg)	1968–09–05	Georgia Tech
G	20	Brian Shaw	6 ft 6 in (1.98 m)	190 lb (86 kg)	1966–03–22	UC Santa Barbara
G	22	Brooks Thompson	6 ft 4 in (1.93 m)	193 lb (88 kg)	1970–07–19	Oklahoma State
F	31	Jeff Turner	6 ft 9 in (2.06 m)	230 lb (104 kg)	1962–04–09	Vanderbilt

Coaches
Head coach
- Brian Hill
Assistant(s)
- Richie Adubato
- Tom Sterner
- Tree Rollins (player-coach)

Legend
- (DP) Unsigned draft pick
- (FA) Free agent
- (S) Suspended
- (IN) Inactive
- Injured

Roster
Updated: April 8, 1995

== Regular season ==
=== Season standings ===
Atlantic Division	W	L	PCT	GB	Home	Road	Div
c-Orlando Magic	57	25	.695	—	39–2	18–23	18–10
x-New York Knicks	55	27	.671	2	29–12	26–15	23–5
x-Boston Celtics	35	47	.427	22	20–21	15–26	14–14
Miami Heat	32	50	.390	25	22–19	10–31	9–19
New Jersey Nets	30	52	.366	27	20–21	10–31	13–15
Philadelphia 76ers	24	58	.293	33	14–27	10–31	12–16
Washington Bullets	21	61	.256	36	13–28	8–33	9–19

#	Eastern Conference				
#	Team	W	L	PCT	GB
1	c-Orlando Magic	57	25	.695	–
2	y-Indiana Pacers	52	30	.634	5
3	x-New York Knicks	55	27	.671	2
4	x-Charlotte Hornets	50	32	.610	7
5	x-Chicago Bulls	47	35	.573	10
6	x-Cleveland Cavaliers	43	39	.524	14
7	x-Atlanta Hawks	42	40	.512	15
8	x-Boston Celtics	35	47	.427	22
9	Milwaukee Bucks	34	48	.415	23
10	Miami Heat	32	50	.390	25
11	New Jersey Nets	30	52	.366	27
12	Detroit Pistons	28	54	.341	29
13	Philadelphia 76ers	24	58	.293	33
14	Washington Bullets	21	61	.256	36

=== Game log ===
1994–95 game log
Total: 57–25 (home: 39–2; road: 18–23)
November: 10–2 (home: 6–0; road: 4–2)

Game	Date	Team	Score	High points	High rebounds	High assists	Location Attendance	Record
1	November 4	@ Washington	L 108–110	Shaquille O'Neal (28)	Shaquille O'Neal (12)	Brian Shaw (6)	USAir Arena; 18,756	0–1
2	November 5	Philadelphia	W 122–107	Shaquille O'Neal (30)	Donald Royal (14)	Brian Shaw (9)	Orlando Arena; 16,010	1–1
3	November 9	@ Charlotte	W 130–128 (OT)	Shaquille O'Neal (46)	Shaquille O'Neal (20)	Hardaway, Bowie (7)	Charlotte Coliseum; 23,698	2–1
4	November 10	@ New York	L 99–101	Shaquille O'Neal (41)	Shaquille O'Neal (17)	Hardaway, Royal (6)	Madison Square Garden; 19,763	2–2
5	November 12	@ Philadelphia	W 116–103	Shaquille O'Neal (28)	Shaquille O'Neal (12)	Shaquille O'Neal (6)	CoreStates Spectrum; 17,247	3–2
6	November 15	Washington	W 122–102	Shaquille O'Neal (29)	O'Neal, Grant (13)	three players tied (6)	Orlando Arena; 16,010	4–2
7	November 18	New Jersey	W 113–103	Nick Anderson (25)	Nick Anderson (12)	Penny Hardaway (10)	Orlando Arena; 16,010	5–2
8	November 21	Miami	W 124–89	Penny Hardaway (30)	Horace Grant (10)	Brian Shaw (9)	Orlando Arena; 16,010	6–2
9	November 23	Houston	W 117–94	Shaquille O'Neal (30)	Horace Grant (12)	Penny Hardaway (6)	Orlando Arena; 16,010	7–2
10	November 25	@ Boston	W 124–118	Shaquille O'Neal (36)	Horace Grant (14)	Brian Shaw (9)	Boston Garden; 14,890	8–2
11	November 26	@ Milwaukee	W 113–105	Penny Hardaway (35)	Shaquille O'Neal (12)	Penny Hardaway (12)	Bradley Center; 18,633	9–2
12	November 30	Sacramento	W 114–107	Shaquille O'Neal (41)	Horace Grant (11)	Penny Hardaway (11)	Orlando Arena; 16,010	10–2

December: 13–4 (home: 7–0; road: 6–4)

Game	Date	Team	Score	High points	High rebounds	High assists	Location Attendance	Record
13	December 2	New York	W 125–100	Shaquille O'Neal (38)	Shaquille O'Neal (10)	Penny Hardaway (8)	Orlando Arena; 16,010	11–2
14	December 3	@ Atlanta	L 105–107	Shaquille O'Neal (27)	Shaquille O'Neal (15)	Hardaway, Anderson (7)	Omni Coliseum; 15,752	11–3
15	December 6	@ Cleveland	W 114–97	Anderson, O'Neal (26)	Horace Grant (10)	Nick Anderson (6)	Gund Arena; 20,562	12–3
16	December 7	Cleveland	W 90–75	Shaquille O'Neal (33)	Shaquille O'Neal (10)	Brian Shaw (7)	Orlando Arena; 16,010	13–3
17	December 9	@ Miami	W 110–96	Shaquille O'Neal (25)	Horace Grant (11)	Penny Hardaway (12)	Miami Arena; 15,200	14–3
18	December 10	Atlanta	W 109–98	Shaquille O'Neal (33)	Shaquille O'Neal (13)	Brian Shaw (10)	Orlando Arena; 16,010	15–3
19	December 12	@ New Jersey	L 101–128	Shaquille O'Neal (18)	Horace Grant (17)	Brian Shaw (9)	Brendan Byrne Arena; 20,049	15–4
20	December 14	Denver	W 120–96	Shaquille O'Neal (24)	Anthony Avent (11)	Brian Shaw (9)	Orlando Arena; 16,010	16–4
21	December 16	@ Golden State	W 131–128 (OT)	Shaquille O'Neal (40)	Shaquille O'Neal (18)	Penny Hardaway (13)	Oakland Coliseum Arena; 15,025	17–4
22	December 17	@ Seattle	L 84–124	Shaquille O'Neal (15)	Nick Anderson (8)	O'Neal, Scott (4)	Tacoma Dome; 16,832	17–5
23	December 20	@ Portland	W 108–104	Shaquille O'Neal (30)	Shaquille O'Neal (11)	Penny Hardaway (10)	Memorial Coliseum; 12,888	18–5
24	December 21	@ L.A. Clippers	W 102–91	Shaquille O'Neal (32)	Horace Grant (13)	Brian Shaw (6)	Los Angeles Memorial Sports Arena; 12,498	19–5
25	December 23	Milwaukee	W 123–91	Shaquille O'Neal (32)	Horace Grant (11)	Brian Shaw (12)	Orlando Arena; 16,010	20–5
26	December 26	@ Washington	W 128–121 (OT)	Nick Anderson (35)	Horace Grant (12)	Penny Hardaway (11)	USAir Arena; 18,756	21–5
27	December 27	Miami	W 103–83	Shaquille O'Neal (28)	Horace Grant (15)	Penny Hardaway (7)	Orlando Arena; 16,010	22–5
28	December 29	@ Charlotte	L 123–125	Shaquille O'Neal (30)	Shaquille O'Neal (17)	Penny Hardaway (10)	Charlotte Coliseum; 23,698	22–6
29	December 30	L.A. Clippers	W 116–105 (OT)	Shaquille O'Neal (38)	Horace Grant (17)	Penny Hardaway (10)	Orlando Arena; 16,010	23–6

January: 12–2 (home: 8–0; road: 4–2)

Game	Date	Team	Score	High points	High rebounds	High assists	Location Attendance	Record
30	January 4	New Jersey	W 113–110	Penny Hardaway (33)	Horace Grant (10)	Penny Hardaway (8)	Orlando Arena; 16,010	24–6
31	January 6	Minnesota	W 121–99	Shaquille O'Neal (34)	Horace Grant (10)	Brian Shaw (9)	Orlando Arena; 16,010	25–6
32	January 8	@ Detroit	W 108–88	Penny Hardaway (26)	Horace Grant (14)	Penny Hardaway (5)	The Palace of Auburn Hills; 21,454	26–6
33	January 10	@ Chicago	L 77–109	Shaquille O'Neal (17)	Shaquille O'Neal (12)	Penny Hardaway (5)	United Center; 22,529	26–7
34	January 11	Detroit	W 124–107	Shaquille O'Neal (37)	O'Neal, Grant (7)	Brian Shaw (8)	Orlando Arena; 16,010	27–7
35	January 13	@ Atlanta	W 101–96	Penny Hardaway (26)	Penny Hardaway (13)	Penny Hardaway (6)	Omni Coliseum; 16,378	28–7
36	January 14	Philadelphia	W 91–70	Shaquille O'Neal (31)	Shaquille O'Neal (10)	Penny Hardaway (5)	Orlando Arena; 16,010	29–7
37	January 17	Charlotte	W 109–98	Shaquille O'Neal (35)	Shaquille O'Neal (15)	Brian Shaw (6)	Orlando Arena; 16,010	30–7
38	January 18	@ Dallas	W 108–97	Shaquille O'Neal (42)	Shaquille O'Neal (10)	Nick Anderson (10)	Reunion Arena; 17,502	31–7
39	January 20	@ Denver	W 112–108 (OT)	Penny Hardaway (27)	Grant, O'Neal (12)	Brian Shaw (6)	McNichols Sports Arena; 17,171	32–7
40	January 22	@ Phoenix	L 110–111 (OT)	Shaquille O'Neal (24)	Horace Grant (12)	Penny Hardaway (10)	America West Arena; 19,023	32–8
41	January 24	Boston	W 110–97	Shaquille O'Neal (31)	Shaquille O'Neal (15)	Brian Shaw (9)	Orlando Arena; 16,010	33–8
42	January 26	Chicago	W 102–99	Shaquille O'Neal (37)	Shaquille O'Neal (17)	Hardaway, Shaw (5)	Orlando Arena; 16,010	34–8
43	January 28	Milwaukee	W 107–103	Dennis Scott (27)	Horace Grant (14)	Nick Anderson (7)	Orlando Arena; 16,010	35–8

February: 8–5 (home: 7–1; road: 1–4)

Game	Date	Team	Score	High points	High rebounds	High assists	Location Attendance	Record
44	February 2	Seattle	L 103–106	Shaquille O'Neal (39)	Shaquille O'Neal (15)	Brian Shaw (9)	Orlando Arena; 16,010	35–9
45	February 3	@ Indiana	L 106–118	Dennis Scott (35)	Shaquille O'Neal (10)	Penny Hardaway (7)	Market Square Arena; 16,749	35–10
46	February 5	New York	W 103–100 (OT)	Shaquille O'Neal (41)	Shaquille O'Neal (15)	Penny Hardaway (8)	Orlando Arena; 16,010	36–10
47	February 8	Dallas	W 110–92	Penny Hardaway (20)	Shaquille O'Neal (10)	Hardaway, Anderson (6)	Orlando Arena; 16,010	37–10
All-Star Break
48	February 14	Indiana	W 111–92	Dennis Scott (18)	Horace Grant (16)	Penny Hardaway (6)	Orlando Arena; 16,010	38–10
49	February 15	@ Cleveland	L 99–100 (OT)	Shaquille O'Neal (26)	O'Neal, Anderson (9)	Penny Hardaway (9)	Gund Arena; 20,562	38–11
50	February 17	Philadelphia	W 129–83	Penny Hardaway (31)	Grant, O'Neal (9)	Brian Shaw (6)	Orlando Arena; 16,010	39–11
51	February 19	@ Minnesota	L 95–100	Shaquille O'Neal (36)	Shaquille O'Neal (12)	Penny Hardaway (7)	Target Center; 19,934	39–12
52	February 20	@ Milwaukee	W 152–104	Shaquille O'Neal (30)	Horace Grant (12)	Hardaway, Shaw (8)	Bradley Center; 18,633	40–12
53	February 23	@ Boston	L 117–119	Shaquille O'Neal (38)	Shaquille O'Neal (9)	Nick Anderson (6)	Hartford Civic Center; 15,242	40–13
54	February 24	Boston	W 129–103	Hardaway, Anderson (27)	Nick Anderson (9)	Penny Hardaway (7)	Orlando Arena; 16,010	41–13
55	February 26	Chicago	W 105–103	Penny Hardaway (39)	Tree Rollins (10)	Penny Hardaway (6)	Orlando Arena; 16,010	42–13
56	February 28	New York	W 118–106	Shaquille O'Neal (41)	Horace Grant (14)	Penny Hardaway (12)	Orlando Arena; 16,010	43–13

March: 10–5 (home: 7–1; road: 3–4)

Game	Date	Team	Score	High points	High rebounds	High assists	Location Attendance	Record
57	March 2	@ Houston	W 107–96	Penny Hardaway (30)	Shaquille O'Neal (20)	Dennis Scott (7)	The Summit; 16,611	44–13
58	March 3	@ San Antonio	L 111–112	Shaquille O'Neal (36)	Shaquille O'Neal (12)	Penny Hardaway (7)	Alamodome; 35,818	44–14
59	March 5	Atlanta	W 113–111 (OT)	Shaquille O'Neal (30)	Shaquille O'Neal (9)	Nick Anderson (8)	Orlando Arena; 16,010	45–14
60	March 8	L.A. Lakers	W 114–110	Shaquille O'Neal (46)	Shaquille O'Neal (11)	Penny Hardaway (12)	Orlando Arena; 16,010	46–14
61	March 10	Portland	W 97–85	Shaquille O'Neal (26)	Shaquille O'Neal (15)	Penny Hardaway (6)	Orlando Arena; 16,010	47–14
62	March 12	San Antonio	W 110–104	Penny Hardaway (31)	Shaquille O'Neal (13)	Hardaway, Shaw (6)	Orlando Arena; 16,010	48–14
63	March 14	Utah	L 95–107	Shaquille O'Neal (29)	Horace Grant (14)	Penny Hardaway (5)	Orlando Arena; 16,010	48–15
64	March 15	@ New Jersey	L 99–108	Shaquille O'Neal (34)	Shaquille O'Neal (17)	Nick Anderson (7)	Brendan Byrne Arena; 20,049	48–16
65	March 17	@ Indiana	L 97–107	Shaquille O'Neal (28)	Shaquille O'Neal (14)	Penny Hardaway (11)	Market Square Arena; 16,706	48–17
66	March 21	Phoenix	W 126–102	O'Neal, Hardaway (26)	Horace Grant (11)	Royal, Shaw (5)	Orlando Arena; 16,010	49–17
67	March 23	Charlotte	W 105–93	Shaquille O'Neal (34)	Shaquille O'Neal (15)	Penny Hardaway (16)	Orlando Arena; 16,010	50–17
68	March 24	@ Chicago	W 106–99	Shaquille O'Neal (24)	Shaquille O'Neal (16)	Penny Hardaway (6)	United Center; 22,247	51–17
69	March 26	Golden State	W 132–98	Dennis Scott (32)	Shaquille O'Neal (12)	Penny Hardaway (8)	Orlando Arena; 16,010	52–17
70	March 28	@ Sacramento	L 106–117	Shaquille O'Neal (32)	Shaquille O'Neal (12)	Penny Hardaway (10)	ARCO Arena; 17,317	52–18
71	March 31	@ Utah	W 101–98	Shaquille O'Neal (28)	Shaquille O'Neal (11)	Nick Anderson (6)	Delta Center; 19,911	53–18

April: 4–7 (home: 4–0; road: 0–7)

Game	Date	Team	Score	High points	High rebounds	High assists	Location Attendance	Record
72	April 2	@ L.A. Lakers	L 112–119	Shaquille O'Neal (27)	Shaquille O'Neal (12)	Shaquille O'Neal (6)	Great Western Forum; 17,505	53–19
73	April 5	Detroit	L 125–128	Shaquille O'Neal (40)	Shaquille O'Neal (19)	Dennis Scott (5)	Orlando Arena; 16,010	54–19
74	April 7	@ Detroit	L 94–104	Shaquille O'Neal (31)	Shaquille O'Neal (18)	Anthony Bowie (9)	The Palace of Auburn Hills; 21,454	54–20
75	April 8	@ Philadelphia	L 99–109	Horace Grant (25)	Horace Grant (15)	Brian Shaw (15)	CoreStates Spectrum; 18,168	54–21
76	April 11	Cleveland	W 107–90	Shaquille O'Neal (30)	Shaquille O'Neal (18)	Horace Grant (9)	Orlando Arena; 16,010	55–21
77	April 13	@ Boston	L 114–119	Horace Grant (29)	Shaquille O'Neal (12)	Penny Hardaway (19)	Boston Garden; 14,890	55–22
78	April 15	@ Miami	L 117–123	Shaquille O'Neal (38)	Shaquille O'Neal (16)	Penny Hardaway (18)	Miami Arena; 15,200	55–23
79	April 17	Washington	W 111–100	Shaquille O'Neal (34)	Shaquille O'Neal (12)	Penny Hardaway (12)	Orlando Arena; 16,010	56–23
80	April 19	@ Washington	L 117–123 (OT)	Penny Hardaway (35)	Horace Grant (13)	Penny Hardaway (7)	USAir Arena; 18,756	56–24
81	April 21	Indiana	W 110–86	Grant, O'Neal (20)	Shaquille O'Neal (13)	Nick Anderson (7)	Orlando Arena; 16,010	57–24
82	April 23	@ New York	L 99–113	Dennis Scott (38)	Anthony Avent (10)	Brian Shaw (6)	Madison Square Garden; 19,763	57–25

1994–95 schedule

== Playoffs ==
1995 playoff game log
Eastern Conference First Round: 3–1 (home: 1–1; road: 2–0)

Game	Date	Team	Score	High points	High rebounds	High assists	Location Attendance	Series
1	April 28	Boston	W 124–77	Shaquille O'Neal (23)	Horace Grant (14)	Penny Hardaway (5)	Orlando Arena; 16,010	1–0
2	April 30	Boston	L 92–99	Penny Hardaway (26)	Horace Grant (14)	Penny Hardaway (8)	Orlando Arena; 16,010	1–1
3	May 3	@ Boston	W 82–77	Nick Anderson (24)	Shaquille O'Neal (21)	Penny Hardaway (8)	Boston Garden; 14,890	2–1
4	May 5	@ Boston	W 95–92	Shaquille O'Neal (25)	Shaquille O'Neal (13)	Penny Hardaway (13)	Boston Garden; 14,890	3–1

Eastern Conference semifinals: 4–2 (home: 2–1; road: 2–1)

Game	Date	Team	Score	High points	High rebounds	High assists	Location Attendance	Series
1	May 7	Chicago	W 94–91	Shaquille O'Neal (26)	Shaquille O'Neal (12)	Hardaway, Shaw (6)	Orlando Arena; 16,010	1–0
2	May 10	Chicago	L 94–104	Shaquille O'Neal (25)	Horace Grant (15)	Penny Hardaway (7)	Orlando Arena; 16,010	1–1
3	May 12	@ Chicago	W 110–101	Shaquille O'Neal (28)	Horace Grant (14)	Penny Hardaway (8)	United Center; 24,281	2–1
4	May 14	@ Chicago	L 95–106	Horace Grant (21)	Horace Grant (13)	Shaquille O'Neal (9)	United Center; 24,358	2–2
5	May 16	Chicago	W 103–95	Horace Grant (24)	Shaquille O'Neal (22)	Penny Hardaway (11)	Orlando Arena; 16,010	3–2
6	May 18	@ Chicago	W 108–102	Shaquille O'Neal (27)	Shaquille O'Neal (13)	Penny Hardaway (7)	United Center; 24,322	4–2

Eastern Conference finals: 4–3 (home: 4–0; road: 0–3)

Game	Date	Team	Score	High points	High rebounds	High assists	Location Attendance	Series
1	May 23	Indiana	W 105–101	Shaquille O'Neal (32)	Horace Grant (12)	Penny Hardaway (14)	Orlando Arena; 16,010	1–0
2	May 25	Indiana	W 119–114	Shaquille O'Neal (39)	Horace Grant (12)	Penny Hardaway (15)	Orlando Arena; 16,010	2–0
3	May 27	@ Indiana	L 100–105	Penny Hardaway (29)	Jeff Turner (7)	three players tied (4)	Market Square Arena; 16,477	2–1
4	May 29	@ Indiana	L 93–94	Penny Hardaway (26)	Horace Grant (12)	Brian Shaw (5)	Market Square Arena; 16,477	2–2
5	May 31	Indiana	W 108–106	Shaquille O'Neal (35)	Shaquille O'Neal (13)	Penny Hardaway (8)	Orlando Arena; 16,010	3–2
6	June 2	@ Indiana	L 96–123	Shaquille O'Neal (26)	Horace Grant (9)	Nick Anderson (5)	Market Square Arena; 16,477	3–3
7	June 4	Indiana	W 105–81	Shaquille O'Neal (25)	Shaquille O'Neal (11)	Nick Anderson (7)	Orlando Arena; 16,010	4–3

NBA Finals: 0–4 (home: 0–2; road: 0–2)

Game	Date	Team	Score	High points	High rebounds	High assists	Location Attendance	Series
1	June 7	Houston	L 118–120 (OT)	Hardaway, O'Neal (26)	Grant, O'Neal (16)	Shaquille O'Neal (9)	Orlando Arena; 16,010	0–1
2	June 9	Houston	L 106–117	Shaquille O'Neal (33)	Shaquille O'Neal (12)	Penny Hardaway (8)	Orlando Arena; 16,010	0–2
3	June 11	@ Houston	L 103–106	Shaquille O'Neal (28)	three players tied (10)	Penny Hardaway (14)	The Summit; 16,611	0–3
4	June 14	@ Houston	L 101–113	Hardaway, O'Neal (25)	Grant, O'Neal (12)	Penny Hardaway (5)	The Summit; 16,611	0–4

1995 schedule

== Player statistics ==
=== Regular season ===
Player	POS	GP	GS	MP	REB	AST	STL	BLK	PTS	MPG	RPG	APG	SPG	BPG	PPG
Shaquille O'Neal	C	79	79	2,923	901	214	73	192	2,315	37.0	11.4	2.7	.9	2.4	29.3
Brian Shaw	PG	78	9	1,836	241	406	73	18	502	23.5	3.1	5.2	.9	.2	6.4
Penny Hardaway	PG	77	77	2,901	336	551	130	26	1,613	37.7	4.4	7.2	1.7	.3	20.9
Anthony Bowie	SG	77	4	1,261	139	159	47	21	427	16.4	1.8	2.1	.6	.3	5.5
Nick Anderson	SG	76	76	2,588	335	314	125	22	1,200	34.1	4.4	4.1	1.6	.3	15.8
Horace Grant	PF	74	74	2,693	715	173	76	88	948	36.4	9.7	2.3	1.0	1.2	12.8
Anthony Avent	PF	71	3	1,066	293	41	28	50	258	15.0	4.1	.6	.4	.7	3.6
Donald Royal	SF	70	68	1,841	279	198	45	16	635	26.3	4.0	2.8	.6	.2	9.1
Dennis Scott	SF	62	10	1,499	146	131	45	14	802	24.2	2.4	2.1	.7	.2	12.9
Tree Rollins	C	51	3	478	95	9	7	36	61	9.4	1.9	.2	.1	.7	1.2
Jeff Turner	PF	49	5	576	97	38	12	3	199	11.8	2.0	.8	.2	.1	4.1
Brooks Thompson	PG	38	2	246	23	43	10	2	116	6.5	.6	1.1	.3	.1	3.1
Darrell Armstrong	PG	3	0	8	1	3	1	0	10	2.7	.3	1.0	.3	.0	3.3
Keith Tower	C	3	0	7	3	0	0	0	1	2.3	1.0	.0	.0	.0	.3
Geert Hammink	C	1	0	7	2	1	0	0	4	7.0	2.0	1.0	.0	.0	4.0

=== Playoffs ===
Player	POS	GP	GS	MP	REB	AST	STL	BLK	PTS	MPG	RPG	APG	SPG	BPG	PPG
Horace Grant	PF	21	21	869	219	39	21	24	287	41.4	10.4	1.9	1.0	1.1	13.7
Penny Hardaway	PG	21	21	849	79	162	40	15	412	40.4	3.8	7.7	1.9	.7	19.6
Nick Anderson	SG	21	21	814	100	65	33	10	298	38.8	4.8	3.1	1.6	.5	14.2
Shaquille O'Neal	C	21	21	805	250	70	18	40	539	38.3	11.9	3.3	.9	1.9	25.7
Dennis Scott	SF	21	15	746	63	45	22	5	308	35.5	3.0	2.1	1.0	.2	14.7
Brian Shaw	PG	21	0	355	62	66	11	4	138	16.9	3.0	3.1	.5	.2	6.6
Donald Royal	SF	18	6	198	19	9	3	0	37	11.0	1.1	.5	.2	.0	2.1
Jeff Turner	PF	18	0	179	25	11	4	3	49	9.9	1.4	.6	.2	.2	2.7
Anthony Bowie	SG	17	0	118	12	18	1	1	55	6.9	.7	1.1	.1	.1	3.2
Tree Rollins	C	14	0	81	6	0	0	6	7	5.8	.4	.0	.0	.4	.5
Anthony Avent	PF	7	0	40	8	0	0	1	9	5.7	1.1	.0	.0	.1	1.3
Brooks Thompson	PG	3	0	11	2	3	0	1	12	3.7	.7	1.0	.0	.3	4.0

== Awards and honors ==
- Shaquille O'Neal – All-NBA 2nd team, Scoring Champion, All-Star
- Penny Hardaway – All-NBA 1st Team, All-Star
- Horace Grant – All-Defensive 2nd Team
- Brian Hill – All-Star East Head Coach

== Transactions ==
=== Trades ===
July 29, 1994	To Orlando Magic 1996 second-round pick 1998 first-round pick	To Washington Bullets Scott Skiles; 1996 first-round pick 1998 first-round pick

=== Free agents ===
Additions
Player	Date signed	Former team
Horace Grant	September 19	Chicago Bulls
Brian Shaw	September 22	Miami Heat
Greg Grant	October 7	Pittsburgh Piranhas (CBA)
Tree Rollins	October 31	Houston Rockets
Darrell Armstrong	April 8	Ourense (Spain)

Subtractions
Player	Date signed	New Team
Litterial Green	July 1	Quad City Thunder (CBA)
Greg Kite	November 3	New York Knicks
Keith Tower	November 17	Atenas Córdoba (Argentina)
Greg Grant	November 28	Mexico Aztecas (CBA)

Player Transactions Citation:
