= 1993–94 Orlando Magic season =

NBA professional basketball team season

- Head coach: Brian Hill
- President: Bob Vander Weide
- General manager: Pat Williams
- Owner: Richard DeVos
- Arena: Orlando Arena

Results
- Record: 50–32 (.610)
- Place: Division: 2nd (Atlantic); Conference: 4th (Eastern)
- Playoff finish: First round (lost to Pacers 0–3)
- Stats at Basketball Reference

Local media
- Television: WKCF; Sunshine Network
- Radio: WDBO

The 1993–94 Orlando Magic season was the fifth season for the Orlando Magic in the National Basketball Association.

== Season summary ==
=== Off-season ===
Despite narrowly missing the NBA playoffs with a 41–41 record the previous season, the Magic received unexpected good fortune by winning the NBA draft lottery for the second consecutive year, despite having the worst odds. In the 1993 NBA draft, the Magic selected power forward Chris Webber from the University of Michigan with the first overall pick, but soon traded him to the Golden State Warriors in exchange for rookie shooting guard, and first-round draft pick Penny Hardaway from the University of Memphis, and three future first-round draft picks; Hardaway was selected by the Warriors as the third overall pick in the draft. During the off-season, the team signed free agent Larry Krystkowiak, and hired assistant coach Brian Hill as their new head coach.

=== Regular season ===
Under Hill and with the addition of Hardaway, the Magic got off to a 16–12 start to the regular season, and later on held a 27–20 record at the All-Star break. At mid-season, the team signed assistant coach Tree Rollins to a player contract, and acquired second-year forward Anthony Avent from the Milwaukee Bucks. The Magic posted a seven-game winning streak in February, and finished in second place in the Atlantic Division with a solid 50–32 record, earning the fourth seed in the Eastern Conference; the team qualified for their first ever NBA playoff appearance in franchise history.

Shaquille O'Neal averaged 29.3 points, 13.2 rebounds and 2.9 blocks per game, and was named to the All-NBA Third Team, while Hardaway had a stellar rookie season, averaging 16.0 points, 5.4 rebounds, 6.6 assists and 2.3 steals per game, and was named to the NBA All-Rookie First Team. In addition, Nick Anderson provided the team with 15.8 points, 5.9 rebounds, 3.6 assists and 1.7 steals per game, along with 101 three-point field goals, while three-point specialist Dennis Scott contributed 12.8 points per game, and led the Magic with 155 three-point field goals, and Scott Skiles provided with 9.9 points and 6.1 assists per game. Meanwhile, Donald Royal contributed 7.4 points per game, Jeff Turner averaged 6.6 points and 4.0 rebounds per game, Krystkowiak provided with 5.1 points and 3.6 rebounds per game, but only appeared in just 34 games, and Anthony Bowie contributed 4.6 points per game.

During the NBA All-Star weekend at the Target Center in Minneapolis, Minnesota, O'Neal was selected for the 1994 NBA All-Star Game, as a member of the Eastern Conference All-Star team, while Hardaway was selected for the inaugural NBA Rookie Game, as a member of the Sensations team. Hardaway scored 22 points along with 3 assists, and was named the Rookie Game's Most Valuable Player, despite the Sensations losing to the Phenoms team, 74–68. O'Neal also finished in fourth place in Most Valuable Player voting, while Hardaway finished in second place in Rookie of the Year voting behind Webber.

The Magic finished 14th in the NBA in home-game attendance, with an attendance of 626,931 at the Orlando Arena during the regular season.

=== NBA playoffs ===
In the Eastern Conference First Round of the 1994 NBA playoffs, the Magic faced off against the 5th–seeded Indiana Pacers, who were led by Reggie Miller, Rik Smits and Derrick McKey. The Magic lost the first two games to the Pacers at home at the Orlando Arena by a total of three points, before losing Game 3 on the road, 99–86 at the Market Square Arena, thus losing the series in a three-game sweep; it was also O'Neal's first ever NBA playoff appearance.

=== Aftermath ===
Following the season, Skiles was traded to the Washington Bullets after five seasons with the Magic, and Krystkowiak signed as a free agent with the Chicago Bulls.

== Offseason ==
- Chris Webber was selected by the Orlando Magic with the first pick of the 1993 NBA draft, becoming the first sophomore since Magic Johnson to be a #1 overall draft pick. The Magic immediately traded him to the Golden State Warriors in exchange for Penny Hardaway and three future first round draft picks.

== Draft picks ==
Round	Pick	Player	Position	Nationality	School/Club team
1	1	Chris Webber	PF/C	United States	Michigan
1	26	Geert Hammink	C	Netherlands	LSU

== Roster ==
1993–94 Orlando Magic roster
Players

Pos.	No.	Player	Height	Weight	DOB	From
G/F	25	Nick Anderson	6 ft 6 in (1.98 m)	205 lb (93 kg)	1968–01–20	Illinois
F	00	Anthony Avent	6 ft 9 in (2.06 m)	235 lb (107 kg)	1969–10–18	Seton Hall
G	14	Anthony Bowie	6 ft 6 in (1.98 m)	190 lb (86 kg)	1963–11–09	Oklahoma
G	11	Litterial Green	6 ft 1 in (1.85 m)	185 lb (84 kg)	1970–03–07	Georgia
C	43	Geert Hammink	7 ft 0 in (2.13 m)	262 lb (119 kg)	1969–07–12	LSU
G	1	Penny Hardaway	6 ft 7 in (2.01 m)	195 lb (88 kg)	1971–07–18	Memphis
C	34	Greg Kite	6 ft 11 in (2.11 m)	250 lb (113 kg)	1961–08–05	BYU
F	42	Larry Krystkowiak	6 ft 9 in (2.06 m)	220 lb (100 kg)	1964–09–23	Montana
C	32	Shaquille O'Neal	7 ft 1 in (2.16 m)	325 lb (147 kg)	1972–03–06	LSU
C	30	Tree Rollins	7 ft 1 in (2.16 m)	235 lb (107 kg)	1955–06–16	Clemson
F	5	Donald Royal	6 ft 8 in (2.03 m)	210 lb (95 kg)	1966–05–22	Notre Dame
G/F	3	Dennis Scott	6 ft 8 in (2.03 m)	229 lb (104 kg)	1968–09–05	Georgia Tech
G	4	Scott Skiles	6 ft 1 in (1.85 m)	180 lb (82 kg)	1964–03–05	Michigan State
C	55	Keith Tower	6 ft 11 in (2.11 m)	250 lb (113 kg)	1970–05–15	Notre Dame
F	31	Jeff Turner (injured)	6 ft 9 in (2.06 m)	230 lb (104 kg)	1962–04–09	Vanderbilt

Coaches
Head coach
- Brian Hill
Assistant(s)
- Bob Hill
- Tree Rollins

Legend
- (DP) Unsigned draft pick
- (FA) Free agent
- (S) Suspended
- Injured

Roster
Updated: February 24, 1994

=== Roster notes ===
- Center Tree Rollins was a player-coach during the regular season.

== Regular season ==
- Penny Hardaway started out the season at the shooting guard position while he learned the point guard position from veteran Scott Skiles. By mid-season he took over point guard duties from Skiles. He immediately made an impact on the league, winning the MVP award at the inaugural Schick Rookie Game. Hardaway helped the Magic to their first playoff berth and first fifty-win season. He averaged 16 points, 6.6 assists, 5.4 rebounds per game while his 190 steals ranked 6th in the league. He recorded his first career triple double on April 15 when he registered 14 points, 12 assists, and 11 rebounds against the Boston Celtics. For his efforts he was named to the NBA All-Rookie First Team, and was the runner-up for Rookie of the Year to the aforementioned Webber.

=== Season standings ===
Atlantic Division	W	L	PCT	GB	Home	Road	Div
y-New York Knicks	57	25	.695	—	32–9	25–16	18–10
x-Orlando Magic	50	32	.610	7	31–10	19–22	20–8
x-New Jersey Nets	45	37	.549	12	29–12	16–25	17–11
x-Miami Heat	42	40	.512	15	22–19	20–21	16–12
Boston Celtics	32	50	.390	25	18–23	14–27	12–16
Philadelphia 76ers	25	57	.305	32	15–26	10–31	7–21
Washington Bullets	24	58	.293	33	17–24	7–34	8–20

#	Eastern Conference				
#	Team	W	L	PCT	GB
1	c-Atlanta Hawks	57	25	.695	–
2	y-New York Knicks	57	25	.695	–
3	x-Chicago Bulls	55	27	.671	2
4	x-Orlando Magic	50	32	.610	7
5	x-Indiana Pacers	47	35	.573	10
6	x-Cleveland Cavaliers	47	35	.573	10
7	x-New Jersey Nets	45	37	.549	12
8	x-Miami Heat	42	40	.512	15
9	Charlotte Hornets	41	41	.500	16
10	Boston Celtics	32	50	.390	25
11	Philadelphia 76ers	25	57	.305	32
12	Washington Bullets	24	58	.293	33
13	Milwaukee Bucks	20	62	.244	37
14	Detroit Pistons	20	62	.244	37

z – clinched division title
y – clinched division title
x – clinched playoff spot

== Playoffs ==
1994 playoff game log
First round: 0–3 (home: 0–2; road: 0–1)

Game	Date	Team	Score	High points	High rebounds	High assists	Location Attendance	Series
1	April 28	Indiana	L 88–89	Shaquille O'Neal (24)	Shaquille O'Neal (19)	Penny Hardaway (10)	Orlando Arena; 15,291	0–1
2	April 30	Indiana	L 101–103	Penny Hardaway (31)	three players tied (7)	Penny Hardaway (7)	Orlando Arena; 15,291	0–2
3	May 2	@ Indiana	L 86–99	Shaquille O'Neal (23)	Shaquille O'Neal (14)	Penny Hardaway (4)	Market Square Arena; 16,562	0–3

1994 schedule

== Player statistics ==
=== Regular season ===
Player	POS	GP	GS	MP	REB	AST	STL	BLK	PTS	MPG	RPG	APG	SPG	BPG	PPG
Penny Hardaway	PG	82	82	3,015	439	544	190	51	1,313	36.8	5.4	6.6	2.3	.6	16.0
Scott Skiles	PG	82	46	2,303	189	503	47	2	815	28.1	2.3	6.1	.6	.0	9.9
Dennis Scott	SF	82	37	2,283	218	216	81	32	1,046	27.8	2.7	2.6	1.0	.4	12.8
Shaquille O'Neal	C	81	81	3,224	1,072	195	76	231	2,377	39.8	13.2	2.4	.9	2.9	29.3
Nick Anderson	SG	81	81	2,811	476	294	134	33	1,277	34.7	5.9	3.6	1.7	.4	15.8
Donald Royal	SF	74	0	1,357	248	61	50	16	547	18.3	3.4	.8	.7	.2	7.4
Anthony Bowie	SG	70	0	948	120	102	32	12	320	13.5	1.7	1.5	.5	.2	4.6
Jeff Turner	PF	68	51	1,536	271	60	23	11	451	22.6	4.0	.9	.3	.2	6.6
Tree Rollins	C	45	1	384	96	9	7	35	76	8.5	2.1	.2	.2	.8	1.7
Anthony Avent^{†}	PF	41	20	676	184	32	17	11	144	16.5	4.5	.8	.4	.3	3.5
Larry Krystkowiak	PF	34	11	682	123	35	14	4	173	20.1	3.6	1.0	.4	.1	5.1
Greg Kite	C	29	0	309	70	4	2	12	34	10.7	2.4	.1	.1	.4	1.2
Litterial Green	PG	29	0	126	12	9	6	1	73	4.3	.4	.3	.2	.0	2.5
Keith Tower	C	11	0	32	6	1	0	0	8	2.9	.5	.1	.0	.0	.7
Todd Lichti^{†}	SG	4	0	20	4	2	2	0	8	5.0	1.0	.5	.5	.0	2.0
Lorenzo Williams^{†}	PF	3	0	19	4	2	2	3	2	6.3	1.3	.7	.7	1.0	.7
Anthony Cook^{†}	PF	2	0	2	0	0	0	2	0	1.0	.0	.0	.0	1.0	.0
Geert Hammink	C	1	0	3	1	1	0	0	2	3.0	1.0	1.0	.0	.0	2.0

- ^{†} Denotes player spent time with another team in the season. Stats reflect time with the Magic only.

=== Playoffs ===
Player	POS	GP	GS	MP	REB	AST	STL	BLK	PTS	MPG	RPG	APG	SPG	BPG	PPG
Penny Hardaway	PG	3	3	133	20	21	5	6	56	44.3	6.7	7.0	1.7	2.0	18.7
Shaquille O'Neal	C	3	3	126	40	7	2	9	62	42.0	13.3	2.3	.7	3.0	20.7
Nick Anderson	SG	3	3	120	10	10	5	2	43	40.0	3.3	3.3	1.7	.7	14.3
Dennis Scott	SF	3	3	99	6	3	2	3	43	33.0	2.0	1.0	.7	1.0	14.3
Larry Krystkowiak	PF	3	3	92	25	9	3	2	18	30.7	8.3	3.0	1.0	.7	6.0
Donald Royal	SF	3	0	45	4	5	1	0	21	15.0	1.3	1.7	.3	.0	7.0
Tree Rollins	C	3	0	29	3	0	1	1	4	9.7	1.0	.0	.3	.3	1.3
Anthony Avent	PF	2	0	40	11	1	0	0	19	20.0	5.5	.5	.0	.0	9.5
Scott Skiles	PG	2	0	23	1	3	0	0	9	11.5	.5	1.5	.0	.0	4.5
Anthony Bowie	SG	2	0	13	0	0	0	0	0	6.5	.0	.0	.0	.0	.0

== Awards and honors ==
- Shaquille O'Neal – All-NBA 3rd team, Field goal percentage leader, All-Star
- Penny Hardaway – All-Rookie 1st Team, Schick Rookie Challenge MVP
