= Nick Anderson (basketball) =

American basketball player (born 1968)

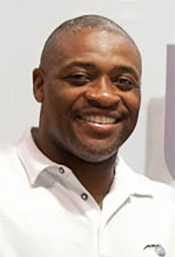
- Anderson in 2012

Personal information
- Born: January 20, 1968 (age 58) Chicago, Illinois, U.S.
- Listed height: 6 ft 6 in (1.98 m)
- Listed weight: 228 lb (103 kg)

Career information
- High school: Simeon Career Academy (Chicago, Illinois)
- College: Illinois (1987–1989)
- NBA draft: 1989: 1st round, 11th overall pick
- Drafted by: Orlando Magic
- Playing career: 1989–2002
- Position: Shooting guard / small forward
- Number: 25

Career history
- 1989–1999: Orlando Magic
- 1999–2001: Sacramento Kings
- 2001–2002: Memphis Grizzlies

Career highlights
- First-team All-Big Ten (1989); Second-team Parade All-American (1986); McDonald's All-American (1986); Illinois Mr. Basketball (1986)

Career NBA statistics
- Points: 11,529 (14.4 ppg)
- Rebounds: 4,064 (5.1 rpg)
- Steals: 1,114 (1.4 spg)
- Stats at NBA.com
- Stats at Basketball Reference

Nelison "Nick" Anderson (born January 20, 1968) is an American former professional basketball player who played for the Orlando Magic, Sacramento Kings, and Memphis Grizzlies of the National Basketball Association (NBA).

Born in Chicago, Illinois, Anderson played high school basketball at Simeon Career Academy where he was named "Illinois Mr. Basketball" for 1986 after leading his team to the city championship and a top national ranking in USA Today.

Anderson would go on to play at the University of Illinois for three years. He was then drafted by the Orlando Magic in the 1989 NBA draft. He currently serves the Magic in several off-the-court functions and was elected to the "Illini Men's Basketball All-Century Team" in 2004.

== College career ==
Anderson attended the University of Illinois at Urbana–Champaign for three years, playing on the team that reached the NCAA Final Four in 1989; that Fighting Illini team was given the nickname "Flyin' Illini" by Dick Vitale. Among Anderson's teammates were Kendall Gill, Stephen Bardo, Kenny Battle, Lowell Hamilton, and Marcus Liberty; all of them except Hamilton would go on to play in the NBA.

== NBA career ==
=== Early years ===
Anderson left school and entered the NBA draft in 1989, where he was selected with the 11th pick of the first round by the Orlando Magic. As the Magic were an expansion team that season, Anderson was the first draft pick in the franchise's history.

Like most expansion franchises, the Magic were a young team and Anderson was one of its few bright spots. As a result, the Magic were awarded high draft picks in several consecutive years, including Dennis Scott in 1990, Shaquille O'Neal in 1992, and Chris Webber, who was traded for a package including Penny Hardaway in 1993. In his first few seasons, Anderson was the Magic's top scoring option, and led the team in points per game during the 1991–92 season. As the team's talent level increased, Anderson was gradually relegated to a lesser offensive role but remained a consistent member of the team's starting lineup. Exceptions include the April 23, 1993 game at New Jersey, in which he scored a career-high 50 points off the bench. In 1994–95, Anderson led Orlando in three-pointers with 179, and averaged 15.9 points per game. The Magic won 57 games, finished with the best record in the Eastern Conference, and won their first ever Atlantic Division title.

=== 1994–95 postseason ===
In the Eastern Conference semifinals, the Magic faced the Chicago Bulls and Michael Jordan, who had recently returned from an aborted baseball career wearing the number 45 instead of his famous number 23. At the end of Game One, Anderson famously stripped Jordan from behind, leading to the game-winning basket for the Magic. He later commented that Jordan "didn't look like the old Michael Jordan" and that "No. 45 doesn't explode like No. 23 used to." Jordan then returned to wearing his old number in the next game, scoring 38 points in a Bulls win; the Magic would bounce back and win the series to advance to their first NBA Finals.

Game One of the NBA Finals was against the defending champion Houston Rockets, at the Orlando Arena. With the Magic up by three points late in the game, Anderson, typically a 70% free throw shooter, missed four consecutive free throws that could have sealed the victory for Orlando. Kenny Smith hit a three-pointer for Houston shortly thereafter, tying the game and sending it to overtime. The Rockets went on to win the game in overtime and eventually swept the Magic, winning their second consecutive NBA Championship. As a result of this incident, some Orlando fans began to label Anderson with the derogatory nicknames of "Nick the Brick" and "Brick Anderson".

=== Post-1995 career ===
He showed no immediate effect from his struggles in the 1995 finals, as he had another strong season in 1995–96. However, his season ended due to a wrist injury in Game 3 of the Eastern Conference Finals. After that, Anderson's career took an abrupt downward spiral, largely due to a sudden inability to shoot free throws. During the 1996–97 season, Anderson's free throw shooting percentage tumbled to a career-low 40.4% and his scoring average to 12.0 points per game. Anderson had to be removed from the closing minutes of several close games due to being an unreliable free throw shooter.

His struggles worsened through the first half of the 1997–98 season. Through January 27 of that season, Anderson was averaging only 6.5 points per game, and shooting a paltry 36.3% from the free throw line. However, in the second half of the season, Anderson experienced a sudden career revival, as his scoring average abruptly jumped to 22.6 points per game, and his free throw percentage improved to a 67.6%, a figure close to his former career average. He ended the season with a scoring average of 15.3 points per game.

Anderson would play on with the Magic through the lockout-shortened 1998–99 season, after which he was traded to the Sacramento Kings for Tariq Abdul-Wahad and draft compensation. He left Orlando as the team's career scoring leader. He was the last player remaining from the Magic's original expansion roster, having remained with the franchise for ten seasons.

He played two seasons in Sacramento, averaging a career-low at that point, 10.8 points per contest in 72 games his first season. He played 21 games the next season, and 15 games in his final season, in which he played for the Memphis Grizzlies.

Anderson works for the Orlando Magic in the team's community relations department. He also serves as a commentator for Fox Sports Florida during the Magic's pre-game, halftime and post-game shows.

== Honors ==
=== High school ===
- 1986 – IHSA 1st Team All-State
- 1986 – Parade Magazine 2nd Team All-American
- 1986 – McDonald's All-American
- 1986 – Illinois Mr. Basketball
- 2013 – Inducted into the Illinois Basketball Coaches Association's Hall of Fame as a player.

=== College ===
- 1988 – Illini Co-MVP
- 1988 – 2nd Team All-Big Ten
- 1988 – Honorable Mention All American
- 1989 – Illini MVP
- 1989 – 1st Team All-Big Ten
- 1989 – NCAA All-Regional Team (MOP)
- 1989 – Honorable Mention All American
- 1989 – First player ever drafted by the Orlando Magic.
- 2004 – Elected to the "Illini Men's Basketball All-Century Team".
- 2008 – Honored jersey which hangs in the State Farm Center to show regard for being the most decorated basketball players in the University of Illinois' history.
- 2017 – Inducted into the Illinois Athletics Hall of Fame

== College statistics ==
=== University of Illinois ===
Season	Games	Points	PPG	Field Goals	Attempts	Avg	Free Throws	Attempts	Avg	Rebounds	Avg	Assists	APG	Blocks	BPG	Steals	SPG
1987–88	33	525	15.9	223	390	.572	77	120	.642	217	6.6	53	1.6	28	0.8	37	1.1
1988–89	36	647	18.0	262	487	.538	99	148	.669	285	7.9	72	2.0	32	0.9	57	1.6
Totals	69	1,172	17.0	485	877	.553	176	268	.657	502	7.3	125	1.8	60	0.9	94	1.4

== NBA career statistics ==
Legend
GP	Games played	GS	Games started	MPG	Minutes per game
FG%	Field goal percentage	3P%	3-point field goal percentage	FT%	Free throw percentage
RPG	Rebounds per game	APG	Assists per game	SPG	Steals per game
BPG	Blocks per game	PPG	Points per game	**Bold**	Career high

=== Regular season ===
Year	Team	GP	GS	MPG	FG%	3P%	FT%	RPG	APG	SPG	BPG	PPG
1989–90	Orlando	**81**	9	22.0	**.494**	.059	.705	3.9	1.5	0.9	0.4	11.5
1990–91	Orlando	70	42	28.2	.467	.293	.668	5.5	1.5	1.1	0.6	14.1
1991–92	Orlando	60	59	36.7	.463	.353	.667	**6.4**	2.7	1.6	0.6	**20.0**
1992–93	Orlando	79	76	**37.0**	.449	.353	**.741**	6.0	3.4	1.6	**0.7**	**20.0**
1993–94	Orlando	**81**	**81**	34.7	.478	.322	.672	5.9	3.6	**1.7**	0.4	15.8
1994–95	Orlando	76	76	34.1	.476	**.415**	.704	4.4	**4.1**	1.6	0.3	15.8
1995–96	Orlando	77	77	35.3	.442	.391	.692	5.4	3.6	1.6	0.6	14.7
1996–97	Orlando	63	61	34.3	.397	.353	.404	4.8	2.9	**1.9**	0.5	12.0
1997–98	Orlando	58	44	29.3	.455	.360	.638	5.1	2.1	1.2	0.4	15.3
1998–99	Orlando	47	39	33.6	.395	.347	.611	5.9	1.9	1.4	0.3	14.9
1999–00	Sacramento	72	72	29.1	.391	.332	.487	4.7	1.7	1.3	0.2	10.8
2000–01	Sacramento	21	0	8.0	.246	.256	–	1.2	0.6	0.5	0.2	1.8
2001–02	Memphis	15	0	14.6	.276	.271	.556	2.2	0.9	0.4	0.4	4.0
Career		800	636	31.2	.446	.356	.667	5.1	2.6	1.4	0.5	14.4

=== Playoffs ===
Year	Team	GP	GS	MPG	FG%	3P%	FT%	RPG	APG	SPG	BPG	PPG
1994	Orlando	3	3	**40.0**	.382	**.400**	.750	3.3	**3.3**	1.7	0.7	14.3
1995	Orlando	**21**	**21**	38.8	**.448**	.383	.683	4.8	3.1	1.6	0.5	14.2
1996	Orlando	11	11	38.0	.433	.286	.622	5.0	1.9	1.9	0.5	14.2
1997	Orlando	5	5	26.0	.333	.267	.000	5.8	0.6	0.6	**1.8**	5.6
1999	Orlando	4	4	38.0	.367	.262	.737	**6.8**	2.3	**2.3**	0.0	**20.8**
2000	Sacramento	5	5	26.4	.324	.350	**.875**	3.4	0.4	0.2	0.6	7.2
Career		49	49	36.0	.413	.333	.678	4.9	2.2	1.5	0.6	13.1

Awards and achievements
Preceded by Ed Horton	Illinois Mr. Basketball Award Winner; 1986	Succeeded by Marcus Liberty
