= Brian Hill (basketball) =

American basketball coach (born 1947)

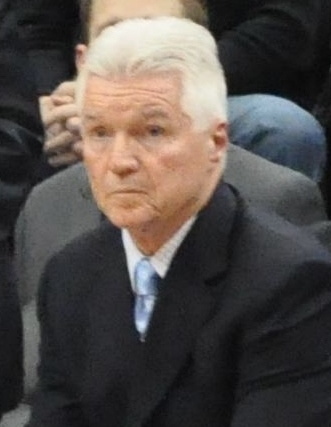
- Hill in 2012 as Detroit Pistons assistant coach

Personal information
- Born: September 19, 1947 (age 79) East Orange, New Jersey, U.S.
- Listed height: 5 ft 9 in (1.75 m)
- Listed weight: 175 lb (79 kg)

Career information
- High school: Our Lady of the Valley (Orange, New Jersey)
- College: John F. Kennedy College (1965–1969)
- Coaching career: 1970–2013

Career highlights
- As coach: NBA All-Star Game head coach (1995)

Brian Alfred Hill (born September 19, 1947) is an American former professional basketball coach.

== Early life ==
Born in East Orange, New Jersey, Hill graduated from Our Lady of the Valley High School in Orange, New Jersey in 1965 and John F. Kennedy College in Nebraska in 1969 with a degree in physical education. Hill was a three-year starter on the Kennedy basketball team.

== Coaching career ==
In 1970, Hill began his coaching career as head coach at Clifford Scott High School in his native East Orange, New Jersey. Hill then was an assistant coach at Montclair State College from 1972 to 1974.

Hill began his tenure at Lehigh University as an assistant coach for one season before being promoted on April 9, 1975, to succeed Tom Pugliese who had resigned sixteen days prior on March 24. He inherited a program whose 1–23 record in 1974–75 was the worst among major colleges nationally. His 75–131 record in eight seasons included a 14–12 performance in 1980–81 which was the Engineers' best campaign in 65 years. He left Lehigh to join Bruce Parkhill's staff at Penn State on April 13, 1983.

Hill began his NBA coaching career in 1986 as an assistant coach for the Atlanta Hawks under Mike Fratello. The two met at Montclair State College when Hill was studying to be certified as a driver's education teacher. In 1990, Hill joined the Orlando Magic as an assistant coach under Matt Guokas. He was the head coach of the Orlando Magic from 1993 to 1997 and is the Magic's most successful coach with a record of 191–104. During that time period, he led the Magic to their first NBA Finals in 1995 and also led the team to a 60–22 record the following season. However, following the loss of star center Shaquille O'Neal to free agency during the off-season, he was fired mid-season in 1997 after a player revolt was led by disgruntled star Penny Hardaway.

Following his firing from the Magic, he became head coach of the third-year, expansion Vancouver Grizzlies in 1997. Hill was fired early in his third season. Following that, he became an assistant coach of the New Jersey Nets, where he remained until the end of the postseason. He was then rehired by the Magic and he led the team to a 36–46 record in the 2005–2006 season.

On May 23, 2007, after multiple media sources reported that Hill would not return to coach the Orlando Magic for the 2007–08 NBA season, but would instead be offered another position within the organization, the Magic released a statement that he would not return as coach of the Magic, although it was reported he was actually fired by general manager Otis Smith. It was a position he had held since May 24, 2005. It was his second stint with the team.

== Head coaching record ==
=== College ===
Record table
Season	Team	Overall	Conference	Standing	Postseason
Lehigh Engineers (East Coast Conference) (1975–1983)
1975–76	Lehigh	9–15	2–8	5th (West)	
1976–77	Lehigh	12–15	6–4	3rd (West)	
1977–78	Lehigh	8–18	5–5	T–2nd (West)	
1978–79	Lehigh	8–18	4–13	5th (West)	
1979–80	Lehigh	5–20	2–14	5th (West)	
1980–81	Lehigh	14–12	6–10	T–3rd (West)	
1981–82	Lehigh	9–17	3–13	T–5th (West)	
1982–83	Lehigh	10–16	2–11	5th (West)	
Lehigh:		75–131	30–78		
Total:		75–131			

=== NBA ===
Legend
Regular season	G	Games coached	W	Games won	L	Games lost	W–L %	Win–loss %
Playoffs	PG	Playoff games	PW	Playoff wins	PL	Playoff losses	PW–L %	Playoff win–loss %

Team	Year	G	W	L	W–L%	Finish	PG	PW	PL	PW–L%	Result
Orlando	1993–94	82	50	32	.610	2nd in Atlantic	3	0	3	.000	Lost in First round
Orlando	1994–95	82	57	25	.695	1st in Atlantic	21	11	10	.524	Lost in NBA Finals
Orlando	1995–96	82	60	22	.732	1st in Atlantic	12	7	5	.583	Lost in Conf. Finals
Orlando	1996–97	49	24	25	.490	(fired)	—	—	—	—	—
Vancouver	1997–98	82	19	63	.232	6th in Midwest	—	—	—	—	Missed playoffs
Vancouver	1998–99	50	8	42	.160	7th in Midwest	—	—	—	—	Missed playoffs
Vancouver	1999–2000	22	4	18	.182	(fired)	—	—	—	—	—
Orlando	2005–06	82	36	46	.439	3rd in Southeast	—	—	—	—	Missed playoffs
Orlando	2006–07	82	40	42	.488	3rd in Southeast	4	0	4	.000	Lost in First round
Career		673	298	315	.486		40	18	22	.450	

== Personal life ==
Hill, a graduate of John F. Kennedy College in Nebraska, has two adult children, Kimberly and Christopher. His daughter was diagnosed with cystic fibrosis at 5 years old and, as a result, Hill has supported cystic fibrosis research by holding fundraisers and speaking to crowds about the disease. He and his wife Kay live in Orlando, Florida, where they have remained even after his original departure from the Orlando Magic.
