= Brian Shaw (basketball) =

American basketball player and coach

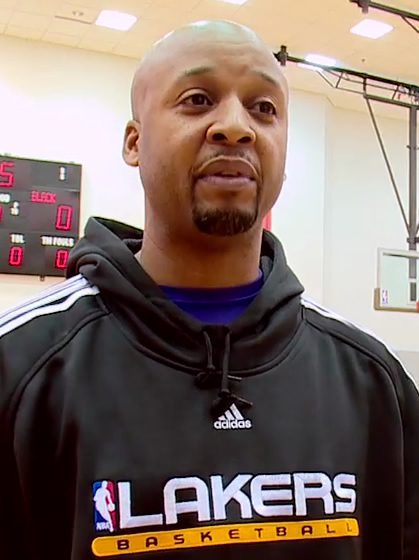
- Shaw with the Los Angeles Lakers in 2010

Los Angeles Clippers
- Title: Assistant coach
- League: NBA

Personal information
- Born: March 22, 1966 (age 60) Oakland, California, U.S.
- Listed height: 6 ft 6 in (1.98 m)
- Listed weight: 200 lb (91 kg)

Career information
- High school: Bishop O'Dowd (Oakland, California)
- College: Saint Mary's (1983–1985); UC Santa Barbara (1986–1988)
- NBA draft: 1988: 1st round, 24th overall pick
- Drafted by: Boston Celtics
- Playing career: 1988–2003
- Position: Point guard / shooting guard
- Number: 20, 22, 7
- Coaching career: 2005–present

Career history

Playing
- 1988–1989: Boston Celtics
- 1989–1990: Il Messaggero Roma
- 1990–1992: Boston Celtics
- 1992–1994: Miami Heat
- 1994–1997: Orlando Magic
- 1997–1998: Golden State Warriors
- 1998: Philadelphia 76ers
- 1999: Portland Trail Blazers
- 1999–2003: Los Angeles Lakers

Career highlights
- As player: 3× NBA champion (2000–2002); NBA All-Rookie Second Team (1989); PCAA Player of the Year (1988); First-team All-PCAA (1988); Second-team All-PCAA (1987); No. 22 retired by UC Santa Barbara Gauchos; As assistant coach: 2× NBA champion (2009, 2010)

Career NBA statistics
- Points: 6,547 (6.9 ppg)
- Rebounds: 3,183 (3.4 rpg)
- Assists: 3,918 (4.2 apg)
- Stats at NBA.com
- Stats at Basketball Reference
Medals
Men's basketball
Representing United States
FIBA World Championship
Gold medal – first place	1986 Spain	National team

Brian Keith Shaw (born March 22, 1966) is an American professional basketball coach and former player who is an assistant coach for the Los Angeles Clippers of the National Basketball Association (NBA). He played both guard positions, but was used primarily at point guard in his 14 seasons in the NBA. He won three NBA championships playing with the Los Angeles Lakers.

== Early life ==
Brian Keith Shaw was born on March 22, 1966, in Oakland, California. Shaw grew up with other future basketball stars such as Antonio Davis and Gary Payton, as well as Demetrius "Hook" Mitchell. In his youth, he was a participant at the East Oakland Youth Development Center, a local community organization where he played basketball. He attended Westlake Middle School and then Bishop O'Dowd High School in Oakland, where he excelled in basketball.

== College career ==
Shaw attended St. Mary's College of California for his freshman and sophomore years of college, then transferred to UC Santa Barbara for his junior and senior seasons. In his senior year, he was named Pacific Coast Athletic Association (PCAA) player of the year as he led the Gauchos to their first-ever NCAA tournament berth.

During his college career, Shaw also played for the US national team in the 1986 FIBA World Championship, winning the gold medal. In the final between the United States and Soviet Union, Shaw hit a key three-pointer in the closing seconds. The American team won the game by two points.

== Professional career ==
=== Boston Celtics (1988–1989) ===
He was taken with the 24th overall pick by the Boston Celtics in the 1988 NBA draft.

=== Il Messaggero Roma (1989–1990) ===
In 1988, Shaw signed a one-year contract with the Celtics. In 1989, Shaw signed a two-year contract to play with an Italian team, Il Messaggero Roma.

=== Boston Celtics (1990–1992) ===
At the end of January 1990, Shaw signed a 5-year deal with the Celtics. In June of that year, Shaw told the Celtics he planned to play for Il Messaggero during the 1990–91 season. The ensuing contract dispute, Boston Celtics v. Brian Shaw, which Shaw lost, became a relatively famous sports law case and is read in many law school contracts classes. Upon returning to the NBA, Shaw played only two seasons with Boston.

=== Miami Heat (1992–1994) ===
In 1992, Shaw was traded to the Miami Heat for Sherman Douglas.

=== Orlando Magic (1994–1997) ===
In 1994, Shaw signed as a free agent with the Orlando Magic. He appeared in the 1995 NBA Finals with the Magic, averaging 12.5 points in Orlando's sweep loss to the Houston Rockets.

=== Golden State Warriors (1997–1998) ===
Three years later, Shaw was traded to the Golden State Warriors as part of a package for Mark Price.

=== Philadelphia 76ers (1998) ===
In 1998, after Shaw became disgruntled with his role with the Warriors, he was traded alongside Joe Smith to the Philadelphia 76ers for Jim Jackson and Clarence Weatherspoon.

=== Portland Trail Blazers (1999) ===
During the lockout-shortened 1998–1999 season, Shaw signed a ten-day contract with the Portland Trail Blazers in April, and signed a rest-of-season contract afterwards. During the 1999 offseason, the Blazers resigned Shaw to be traded alongside Ed Gray, Walt Williams, Carlos Rogers, Stacey Augmon, and Kelvin Cato to the Houston Rockets for Scottie Pippen. The Rockets subsequently waived Shaw.

=== Los Angeles Lakers (1999–2003) ===
Shaw then signed with the Los Angeles Lakers. He was a member of four squads that made NBA Finals appearances: in 1995 with the Magic and in 2000, 2001, and 2002 with Lakers (winning three NBA championships with the Lakers).

Shaw joined the Los Angeles Lakers in 1999, reuniting with former Orlando teammate Shaquille O'Neal. He served as a backup to All-Star shooting guard Kobe Bryant throughout the season and playoffs as the Lakers had the league's best record winning 67 games. Shaw played in all 22 of the Lakers' playoff games as they advanced past the Sacramento Kings and the Phoenix Suns before facing the Portland Trail Blazers in the Western Conference Finals. The Lakers took a 3–1 lead in the series before the Trail Blazers won games 5 and 6 to tie the series at three games apiece. In game 7, the Trail Blazers lead 75–60 in the fourth quarter. The Blazers shot 5 for 23 in the final quarter as the Lakers made a comeback bolstered by two clutch three-point baskets by Shaw. The Lakers won the game and made the NBA Finals to face the Indiana Pacers. Shaw started in game 3 in place of the injured Bryant, and then played critical minutes in the Lakers overtime win in game 4. The Lakers won the series 4–2, and Shaw won his first NBA championship.

Shaw continued to back up Bryant in the 2000–01 season, but started a total of 28 games. He once again played a key role for the Lakers as they steamrolled through the playoffs and defeated the Philadelphia 76ers 4–1 in the 2001 NBA Finals. The Lakers won a third title in the 2001–02 season before losing in the Western Conference Semifinals to the San Antonio Spurs in the 2002–03 season, and Shaw then retired following the season.

== Coaching career ==
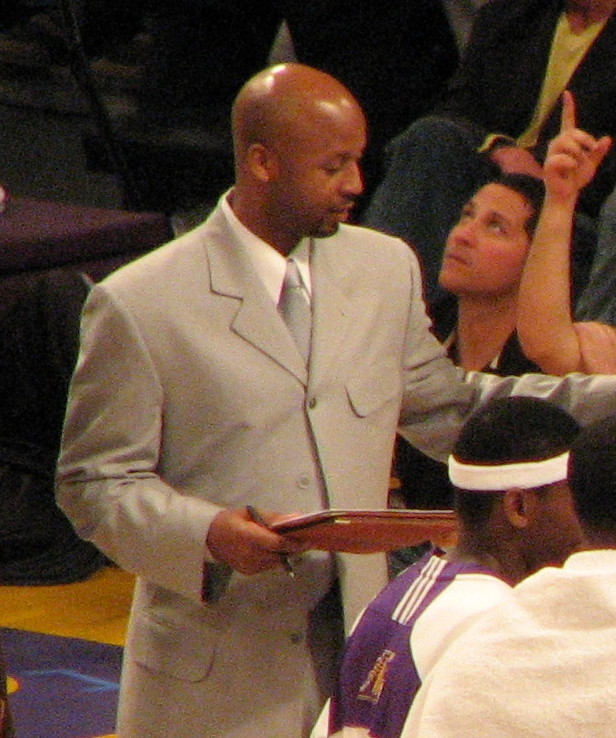
Shaw as an assistant coach with the Los Angeles Lakers in 2007

=== Los Angeles Lakers (2003–2011) ===
Shaw retired following the 2002–03 season. He worked for the Lakers as an Oakland-based scout during the 2003–04 season. He was appointed assistant coach of the Lakers under Phil Jackson during the 2004–05 season. During his first stint with the Lakers, he worked with legends Kobe Bryant, Shaquille O'Neal, Karl Malone, Pau Gasol, Gary Payton, Lamar Odom, while the team won the 2009 and 2010 NBA Finals but came up short in 2004 and 2008. He was considered for the Lakers head coaching job following Phil Jackson's retirement, but was ultimately passed over in favor of Mike Brown.

=== Indiana Pacers (2011–2013) ===
Shaw left the Lakers to join the Indiana Pacers as an assistant coach under Frank Vogel during the 2011–12 season. He was later promoted to associate head coach in 2012–13 season where the team lost game seven in the Eastern Conference Finals against the Miami Heat Big Three. The team experienced success under Shaw with a new core of Paul George, David West, Danny Granger, and Roy Hibbert. Shaw was a highly respected assistant coach by other NBA coaches as well as the media, leading to head coaching opportunities.

=== Denver Nuggets (2013–2015) ===
After spending two years on the Pacers' bench, on June 25, 2013, Shaw was announced as the head coach of the Denver Nuggets, replacing former coach George Karl.

Shaw would make his head coaching debut on October 30, 2013, falling on the road to the Sacramento Kings 90–88 behind a 30-point, 14-rebound performance from star center DeMarcus Cousins. Despite their 1–0 start, Sacramento would lose their following five games to fall to 1–5, while Denver would begin the season 0–3 before defeating the Atlanta Hawks at home 109–107 on November 7 for Shaw’s first win as a head coach. In the two-game season series with the two-time defending champion and eventual Eastern Conference champion Miami Heat, each game would be competitive with the road team winning both games, the Heat winning in Denver 97–94 on December 30 and the Nuggets winning in Miami 111–107 on March 14, 2014.

The Denver Nuggets would finish their 2013-14 season with a record of 36–46, missing the postseason for the first time in eleven years.

On March 3, 2015, he was fired by the Nuggets after compiling a record of 56–85 (.397) in just under two seasons, later being replaced by Michael Malone. Players Shaw coached include Andre Miller, Evan Fournier, Ty Lawson, Arron Afflalo, JaVale McGee, and Timofey Mozgov.

=== Return to the Lakers (2016–2019) ===
In July 2016, Shaw returned to the Los Angeles Lakers as the team's newest associate head coach under new head coach Luke Walton's coaching staff. The Lakers developed young stars Julius Randle, Brandon Ingram, Kyle Kuzma, Lonzo Ball, Jordan Clarkson, Josh Hart, and Alex Caruso before the arrival of LeBron James in 2018–19. With the arrival of James, the Lakers later acquired Anthony Davis and hired a new coaching staff led by former Pacers coach Frank Vogel who would eventually win the 2020 NBA Finals.

=== NBA G League Ignite (2020–2021) ===
On June 10, 2020, Shaw was named as the inaugural head coach of the NBA G League Ignite. He led the team to an 8–8 record and a playoff berth but stepped down from the role after the season following Jalen Green, Jonathan Kuminga, and Isaiah Todd all being selected in the 2021 NBA draft.

=== Los Angeles Clippers (2021–present) ===
On September 24, 2021, Shaw was announced as an assistant coach for the Los Angeles Clippers under Tyronn Lue. On the Clippers, Shaw notably coached superstars Kawhi Leonard, James Harden, Russell Westbrook, and reunited with former Pacers star Paul George.

== Personal life ==
On June 26, 1993, both of Shaw's parents and his sister were killed in a car accident in Nevada. His sister's daughter survived the crash and Shaw, with help from his aunt, helped raise her.

Shaw reportedly dated Madonna when he played for the Miami Heat. Shaw has three children with his wife, Nikki Shaw, who is a professional chef. They met when he was signed as a free agent by the Orlando Magic in 1994 and they married in 1998.

== Legacy ==
While a member of the Heat, on April 8, 1993, Shaw hit a then-NBA record ten three-point field goals (out of 15 attempts) against the Milwaukee Bucks at the Bradley Center, finishing with 32 points. Starting in 1994, he was one-half of the popular "Shaw-Shaq Redemption" (named after The Shawshank Redemption), an alley-oop from Shaw to Shaquille O'Neal that was popular with fans in both Orlando and Los Angeles (Shaw and O'Neal were also Laker teammates). In an interview with The Miami Herald in 2007, O'Neal claimed that the teammate he had most respected in his career was Shaw.

On NBA All-Star Weekend in 2000, held in Oakland, Shaw received a key to the City of Oakland along with his fellow Oakland natives Jason Kidd and Gary Payton.

== Career statistics ==
Legend
GP	Games played	GS	Games started	MPG	Minutes per game
FG%	Field goal percentage	3P%	3-point field goal percentage	FT%	Free throw percentage
RPG	Rebounds per game	APG	Assists per game	SPG	Steals per game
BPG	Blocks per game	PPG	Points per game	**Bold**	Career high
†	Won an NBA championship	*	Led the league

=== NBA ===
==== Regular season ====
Year	Team	GP	GS	MPG	FG%	3P%	FT%	RPG	APG	SPG	BPG	PPG
1988–89	Boston	**82***	54	28.1	.433	.000	.826	4.6	5.8	1.0	.3	8.6
1990–91	Boston	79	**79**	**35.1**	**.469**	.111	.819	**4.7**	**7.6**	**1.3**	.4	**13.8**
1991–92	Boston	17	3	25.6	.427	.000	**.875**	4.1	5.2	.7	**.6**	10.3
1991–92	Miami	46	23	21.5	.398	.313	.725	2.9	3.5	1.0	.3	7.0
1992–93	Miami	68	45	23.6	.393	.331	.782	3.8	3.5	.7	.3	7.3
1993–94	Miami	77	52	26.5	.417	.338	.719	4.5	5.0	.9	.3	9.0
1994–95	Orlando	78	9	23.5	.389	.261	.737	3.1	5.2	.9	.2	6.4
1995–96	Orlando	75	1	22.4	.374	.285	.798	3.0	4.5	.8	.1	6.6
1996–97	Orlando	77	31	24.2	.366	.325	.793	2.5	4.1	.9	.3	7.2
1997–98	Golden State	39	32	26.4	.336	.313	.727	3.9	4.4	.9	.4	6.4
1997–98	Philadelphia	20	2	25.1	.367	.250	.632	3.2	4.4	.7	.2	6.1
1998–99	Portland	1	0	5.0	.000	–	–	1.0	1.0	.0	.0	.0
1999–00†	L.A. Lakers	74	2	16.9	.382	.310	.759	2.9	2.7	.5	.2	4.1
2000–01†	L.A. Lakers	80	28	22.9	.399	.311	.797	3.8	3.2	.6	.3	5.3
2001–02†	L.A. Lakers	58	0	10.9	.353	.330	.692	1.9	1.5	.4	.1	2.9
2002–03	L.A. Lakers	72	0	12.5	.387	**.349**	.667	1.7	1.4	.4	.2	3.5
Career		943	361	23.0	.403	.304	.782	3.4	4.2	.8	.3	6.9

==== Playoffs ====
Year	Team	GP	GS	MPG	FG%	3P%	FT%	RPG	APG	SPG	BPG	PPG
1989	Boston	3	3	**41.3**	**.512**	.000	.778	**5.7**	**6.3**	**1.0**	.0	**17.0**
1991	Boston	11	**11**	28.7	.470	.333	.867	3.5	4.6	.9	.1	11.0
1992	Miami	3	3	28.3	.467	**.600**	.625	4.3	4.0	.7	.0	12.0
1994	Miami	5	5	22.4	.390	.000	.583	4.0	1.8	.8	.2	7.8
1995	Orlando	21	0	16.9	.390	.386	.625	3.0	3.1	.5	.2	6.6
1996	Orlando	10	0	21.7	.346	.364	.750	2.1	4.6	.5	.0	4.7
1997	Orlando	5	4	16.4	.158	.333	.500	1.8	1.6	.2	.2	2.0
2000†	L.A. Lakers	**22**	1	18.5	.421	.333	.813	2.3	3.0	.5	.2	5.4
2001†	L.A. Lakers	16	0	18.1	.375	.345	.667	3.4	2.7	.6	.1	4.4
2002†	L.A. Lakers	19	0	12.5	.333	.281	**1.000**	1.8	1.6	.3	.3	2.9
2003	L.A. Lakers	12	1	17.9	.306	.231	.667	3.2	2.0	.3	**.4**	3.2
Career		127	28	19.2	.395	.318	.725	2.8	3.0	.5	.2	5.7

== Head coaching record ==
Legend
Regular season	G	Games coached	W	Games won	L	Games lost	W–L %	Win–loss %
Playoffs	PG	Playoff games	PW	Playoff wins	PL	Playoff losses	PW–L %	Playoff win–loss %

Team	Year	G	W	L	W–L%	Finish	PG	PW	PL	PW–L%	Result
Denver	2013–14	82	36	46	.439	4th in Northwest	—	—	—	—	Missed playoffs
Denver	2014–15	59	20	39	.339	(fired)	—	—	—	—	—
Career		141	56	85	.397		—	—	—	—	

== See also ==
- List of NCAA Division I basketball career triple-doubles leaders
