= Donald Royal =

American basketball player (born 1966)

Personal information
- Born: May 22, 1966 (age 60) New Orleans, Louisiana, U.S.
- Listed height: 6 ft 8 in (2.03 m)
- Listed weight: 210 lb (95 kg)

Career information
- High school: St. Augustine (New Orleans, Louisiana)
- College: Notre Dame (1983–1987)
- NBA draft: 1987: 3rd round, 52nd overall pick
- Drafted by: Cleveland Cavaliers
- Playing career: 1987–1998
- Position: Small forward
- Number: 15, 5

Career history
- 1987–1988: Pensacola Tornados
- 1988–1989: Cedar Rapids Silver Bullets
- 1989–1990: Minnesota Timberwolves
- 1990–1991: Maccabi Tel Aviv
- 1991: Tri-City Chinook
- 1991–1992: San Antonio Spurs
- 1992–1996: Orlando Magic
- 1996–1997: Golden State Warriors
- 1997: Charlotte Hornets
- 1997: Idaho Stampede
- 1997–1998: Orlando Magic
- 1998: Charlotte Hornets

Career NBA statistics
- Points: 3,151 (6.3 ppg)
- Rebounds: 1,431 (2.8 rpg)
- Stats at NBA.com
- Stats at Basketball Reference

Donald Adam Royal (born May 22, 1966) is an American former professional basketball player, a 6'8" small forward. He played collegiate basketball at the University of Notre Dame, and was selected by the Cleveland Cavaliers in the third round (52nd overall pick) of the 1987 NBA draft. Royal played in eight NBA seasons for five different teams: Minnesota Timberwolves, San Antonio Spurs, Orlando Magic, Golden State Warriors and Charlotte Hornets.

In his NBA career, Royal played in 504 games and scored a total of 3,161 points. His best period as a professional came during the 1992–93 NBA season as a member of the Magic, appearing in 77 games and averaging 9.2 ppg. He was the starting small forward for part of his season with the 1994–95 Orlando Magic. He appeared in the 1995 NBA Finals with the Magic but played only one minute of Game 1. He once dated singer Toni Braxton.

== Career statistics ==
Legend
| GP | Games played | GS | Games started | MPG | Minutes per game |
| FG% | Field goal percentage | 3P% | 3-point field goal percentage | FT% | Free throw percentage |
| RPG | Rebounds per game | APG | Assists per game | SPG | Steals per game |
| BPG | Blocks per game | PPG | Points per game | **Bold** | Career high |

=== NBA ===
==== Regular season ====
| Year | Team | GP | GS | MPG | FG% | 3P% | FT% | RPG | APG | SPG | BPG | PPG |
|---|---|---|---|---|---|---|---|---|---|---|---|---|
| 1989–90 | Minnesota | 66 | 0 | 11.3 | .459 | .000 | .777 | 2.1 | .7 | .5 | .1 | 5.9 |
| 1991–92 | San Antonio | 60 | 4 | 12.0 | .449 | – | .692 | 2.1 | .6 | .4 | .1 | 4.2 |
| 1992–93 | Orlando | **77** | 0 | 21.2 | .496 | .000 | .815 | 3.8 | 1.0 | .5 | **.3** | 9.2 |
| 1993–94 | Orlando | 74 | 0 | 18.3 | .501 | .000 | .740 | 3.4 | .8 | **.7** | .2 | 7.4 |
| 1994–95 | Orlando | 70 | **68** | 26.3 | .475 | .000 | .746 | **4.0** | **2.8** | .6 | .2 | 9.1 |
| 1995–96 | Orlando | 64 | 7 | 15.0 | .491 | .000 | .762 | 2.4 | .7 | .5 | .2 | 5.3 |
| 1996–97 | Orlando | 1 | 1 | **29.0** | .400 | – | **1.000** | 1.0 | 1.0 | .0 | .0 | **12.0** |
| 1996–97 | Golden State | 36 | 1 | 14.1 | .385 | .000 | .795 | 2.6 | .4 | .3 | **.3** | 3.8 |
| 1996–97 | Charlotte | 25 | 2 | 12.8 | **.525** | – | .800 | 2.3 | .4 | .5 | .1 | 2.8 |
| 1997–98 | Orlando | 2 | 0 | 9.0 | .167 | – | .750 | 2.0 | .5 | .5 | .0 | 2.5 |
| 1997–98 | Charlotte | 29 | 5 | 10.5 | .381 | – | .897 | 1.3 | .6 | .2 | .0 | 2.6 |
| Career | | 504 | 88 | 16.8 | .473 | .000 | .770 | 2.8 | 1.0 | .5 | .2 | 6.3 |

==== Playoffs ====
| Year | Team | GP | GS | MPG | FG% | 3P% | FT% | RPG | APG | SPG | BPG | PPG |
|---|---|---|---|---|---|---|---|---|---|---|---|---|
| 1992 | San Antonio | 3 | 2 | **19.0** | .556 | – | .556 | **4.0** | .0 | **.7** | **.7** | 5.0 |
| 1994 | Orlando | 3 | 0 | 15.0 | .429 | – | **.750** | 1.3 | **1.7** | .3 | .0 | **7.0** |
| 1995 | Orlando | **18** | **6** | 11.0 | .333 | – | **.750** | 1.1 | .5 | .2 | .0 | 2.1 |
| 1996 | Orlando | 7 | 0 | 13.1 | **.583** | – | .688 | 1.6 | .1 | .0 | .1 | 3.6 |
| 1997 | Charlotte | 1 | 0 | 4.0 | .000 | – | – | 2.0 | .0 | .0 | .0 | .0 |
| 1998 | Charlotte | 4 | 0 | 7.0 | .429 | – | **.750** | 1.0 | .3 | .0 | .0 | 2.3 |
| Career | | 36 | 8 | 11.8 | .421 | – | .705 | 1.4 | .4 | .2 | .1 | 3.0 |
