= 1994–95 Miami Heat season =

NBA professional basketball team season

- Head coach: Kevin Loughery; Alvin Gentry (interim)
- General manager: Lewis Schaffel
- Owners: Ted Arison; Billy Cunningham; Lewis Schaffel
- Arena: Miami Arena

Results
- Record: 32–50 (.390)
- Place: Division: 4th (Atlantic); Conference: 11th (Eastern)
- Playoff finish: Did not qualify
- Stats at Basketball Reference

Local media
- Television: WBFS-TV; Sunshine Network
- Radio: WINZ

The 1994–95 Miami Heat season was the seventh season for the Miami Heat in the National Basketball Association.

== Season summary ==
=== Off-season ===
The Heat had the twelfth overall pick in the 1994 NBA draft, and selected point guard Khalid Reeves from the University of Arizona. During the off-season, the team signed free agents Kevin Gamble, Ledell Eackles and Brad Lohaus.

=== Regular season ===
Before the start of the regular season, the Heat acquired Billy Owens from the Golden State Warriors, then after the first two games of the season, the team traded Steve Smith, and Grant Long to the Atlanta Hawks in exchange for Kevin Willis.

Despite the addition of Owens, Willis and Reeves, the Heat struggled losing seven of their first eight games of the regular season, on their way to a 10–23 start to the season. After holding a 17–29 record at the All-Star break, head coach Kevin Loughery was fired, and replaced with assistant coach Alvin Gentry as an interim coach. The Heat played above .500 in winning percentage posting a 7–5 record in February, but played below .500 for the remainder of the season, and finished in fourth place in the Atlantic Division with a disappointing 32–50 record.

Glen Rice averaged 22.3 points and 1.4 steals per game, and led the Heat with 185 three-point field goals, while Willis averaged 17.1 points and 10.7 rebounds per game, and Owens provided the team with 14.3 points, 7.2 rebounds and 3.5 assists per game. In addition, Bimbo Coles provided with 10.0 points, 6.1 assists and 1.5 steals per game, while Reeves contributed 9.2 points and 4.3 assists per game, and Matt Geiger averaged 8.3 points and 5.6 rebounds per game. Meanwhile, Gamble contributed 7.4 points per game, John Salley provided with 7.3 points and 4.5 rebounds per game, Eackles and Harold Miner both contributed 7.3 points per game each, and Keith Askins averaged 4.6 points and 4.0 rebounds per game.

During the NBA All-Star weekend at the America West Arena in Phoenix, Arizona, Rice won the NBA Three-Point Shootout, while Miner won the NBA Slam Dunk Contest for the second time, and Reeves was selected for the NBA Rookie Game, as a member of the White team. The Heat finished 22nd in the NBA in home-game attendance, with an attendance of 598,761 at the Miami Arena during the regular season.

=== Notable highlights ===
One notable highlight of the regular season occurred on April 15, 1995, in a home game against the Orlando Magic at the Miami Arena. Rice scored a career-high of 56 points, and made 7 out of 8 three-point field-goal attempts, as the Heat defeated the Magic by a score of 123–117; Rice established a new franchise record that would stand until LeBron James's 61 points on March 3, 2014.

=== Aftermath ===
This was Rice's final season with the Heat, as he was traded along with Geiger and Reeves to the Charlotte Hornets the following season. Meanwhile, Salley was left unprotected in the 1995 NBA expansion draft, where he was selected by the Toronto Raptors expansion team, while Miner was traded to the Cleveland Cavaliers, Eackles re-signed as a free agent with his former team, the Washington Bullets, Lohaus signed with the San Antonio Spurs, and Gentry was fired as head coach and was replaced by Pat Riley, who resigned from coaching the New York Knicks.

== Offseason ==
=== NBA draft ===
| Round | Pick | Player | Position | Nationality | School/Club team |
|---|---|---|---|---|---|
| 1 | 12 | Khalid Reeves | PG | United States | University of Arizona |

== Roster ==
1994–95 Miami Heat roster
Players

| Pos. | No. | Player | Height | Weight | DOB | From |
|---|---|---|---|---|---|---|
| F | 2 | Keith Askins | 6 ft 7 in (2.01 m) | 197 lb (89 kg) | 1967–12–15 | Alabama |
| G | 12 | Bimbo Coles | 6 ft 1 in (1.85 m) | 180 lb (82 kg) | 1968–04–22 | Virginia Tech |
| G | 21 | Ledell Eackles | 6 ft 5 in (1.96 m) | 220 lb (100 kg) | 1966–11–24 | LSU New Orleans |
| G/F | 35 | Kevin Gamble | 6 ft 5 in (1.96 m) | 210 lb (95 kg) | 1965–11–13 | Iowa |
| C | 52 | Matt Geiger | 7 ft 0 in (2.13 m) | 243 lb (110 kg) | 1969–09–10 | Georgia Tech |
| F | 54 | Brad Lohaus | 6 ft 11 in (2.11 m) | 230 lb (104 kg) | 1964–09–29 | Iowa |
| G | 4 | Harold Miner | 6 ft 5 in (1.96 m) | 210 lb (95 kg) | 1971–05–05 | USC |
| G/F | 32 | Billy Owens | 6 ft 8 in (2.03 m) | 220 lb (100 kg) | 1969–05–01 | Syracuse |
| G | 14 | Kevin Pritchard | 6 ft 3 in (1.91 m) | 180 lb (82 kg) | 1967–07–17 | Kansas |
| G | 3 | Khalid Reeves | 6 ft 3 in (1.91 m) | 199 lb (90 kg) | 1972–07–15 | Arizona |
| F | 41 | Glen Rice | 6 ft 7 in (2.01 m) | 215 lb (98 kg) | 1967–05–28 | Michigan |
| F/C | 22 | John Salley | 6 ft 11 in (2.11 m) | 230 lb (104 kg) | 1964–05–16 | Georgia Tech |
| F/C | 42 | Kevin Willis | 7 ft 0 in (2.13 m) | 220 lb (100 kg) | 1962–09–06 | Michigan State |

Coaches
Head coach
- Kevin Loughery
- Alvin Gentry (interim)
Assistant(s)
- Ed Badger
- Tony Fiorentino

Legend
- (DP) Unsigned draft pick
- (FA) Free agent
- (S) Suspended
- Injured

Roster
Updated: April 18, 1995

== Regular season ==
=== Season standings ===
| Atlantic Division | W | L | PCT | GB | Home | Road | Div |
|---|---|---|---|---|---|---|---|
| c-Orlando Magic | 57 | 25 | .695 | — | 39–2 | 18–23 | 18–10 |
| x-New York Knicks | 55 | 27 | .671 | 2 | 29–12 | 26–15 | 23–5 |
| x-Boston Celtics | 35 | 47 | .427 | 22 | 20–21 | 15–26 | 14–14 |
| Miami Heat | 32 | 50 | .390 | 25 | 22–19 | 10–31 | 9–19 |
| New Jersey Nets | 30 | 52 | .366 | 27 | 20–21 | 10–31 | 13–15 |
| Philadelphia 76ers | 24 | 58 | .293 | 33 | 14–27 | 10–31 | 12–16 |
| Washington Bullets | 21 | 61 | .256 | 36 | 13–28 | 8–33 | 9–19 |

| # | Eastern Conference | | | | |
| # | Team | W | L | PCT | GB |
|---|---|---|---|---|---|
| 1 | c-Orlando Magic | 57 | 25 | .695 | – |
| 2 | y-Indiana Pacers | 52 | 30 | .634 | 5 |
| 3 | x-New York Knicks | 55 | 27 | .671 | 2 |
| 4 | x-Charlotte Hornets | 50 | 32 | .610 | 7 |
| 5 | x-Chicago Bulls | 47 | 35 | .573 | 10 |
| 6 | x-Cleveland Cavaliers | 43 | 39 | .524 | 14 |
| 7 | x-Atlanta Hawks | 42 | 40 | .512 | 15 |
| 8 | x-Boston Celtics | 35 | 47 | .427 | 22 |
| 9 | Milwaukee Bucks | 34 | 48 | .415 | 23 |
| 10 | Miami Heat | 32 | 50 | .390 | 25 |
| 11 | New Jersey Nets | 30 | 52 | .366 | 27 |
| 12 | Detroit Pistons | 28 | 54 | .341 | 29 |
| 13 | Philadelphia 76ers | 24 | 58 | .293 | 33 |
| 14 | Washington Bullets | 21 | 61 | .256 | 36 |

== Game log ==
=== Regular season ===
1994–95 game log
Total: 32–50 (Home: 22–19; Road: 10–31)
November: 3–9 (home: 2–3; road: 1–6)

| Game | Date | Team | Score | High points | High rebounds | High assists | Location Attendance | Record |

December: 6–9 (home: 5–4; road: 1–5)

| Game | Date | Team | Score | High points | High rebounds | High assists | Location Attendance | Record |
|---|---|---|---|---|---|---|---|---|
| 24 | December 26, 1994; 7:30 p.m. EST | Houston | L 88–101 | Rice (20) | Rice, Willis (7) | Owens (6) | Miami Arena; 15,200 | 8–16 |

January: 5–10 (home: 3–3; road: 2–7)

| Game | Date | Team | Score | High points | High rebounds | High assists | Location Attendance | Record |
|---|---|---|---|---|---|---|---|---|
| 32 | January 11, 1995; 8:30 p.m. EST | @ Houston | L 97–108 | Miner (19) | Willis (9) | Coles, Reeves (5) | The Summit; 12,424 | 10–22 |

February: 7–5 (home: 4–2; road: 3–3)

| Game | Date | Team | Score | High points | High rebounds | High assists | Location Attendance | Record |
|---|---|---|---|---|---|---|---|---|
All-Star Break

March: 7–11 (home: 4–5; road: 3–6)

| Game | Date | Team | Score | High points | High rebounds | High assists | Location Attendance | Record |

April: 4–6 (home: 4–2; road: 0–4)

| Game | Date | Team | Score | High points | High rebounds | High assists | Location Attendance | Record |

1994–95 schedule

== Player statistics ==
=== Ragular season ===
| Player | POS | GP | GS | MP | REB | AST | STL | BLK | PTS | MPG | RPG | APG | SPG | BPG | PPG |
|---|---|---|---|---|---|---|---|---|---|---|---|---|---|---|---|
| Glen Rice | SF | 82 | 82 | 3,014 | 378 | 192 | 112 | 14 | 1,831 | 36.8 | 4.6 | 2.3 | 1.4 | .2 | 22.3 |
| Kevin Gamble | SF | 77 | 0 | 1,223 | 122 | 119 | 52 | 10 | 566 | 15.9 | 1.6 | 1.5 | .7 | .1 | 7.4 |
| John Salley | C | 75 | 50 | 1,955 | 336 | 123 | 47 | 85 | 547 | 26.1 | 4.5 | 1.6 | .6 | 1.1 | 7.3 |
| Matt Geiger | C | 74 | 43 | 1,712 | 413 | 55 | 41 | 51 | 617 | 23.1 | 5.6 | .7 | .6 | .7 | 8.3 |
| Billy Owens | SG | 70 | 60 | 2,296 | 502 | 246 | 80 | 30 | 1,002 | 32.8 | 7.2 | 3.5 | 1.1 | .4 | 14.3 |
| Bimbo Coles | PG | 68 | 65 | 2,207 | 191 | 416 | 99 | 13 | 679 | 32.5 | 2.8 | 6.1 | 1.5 | .2 | 10.0 |
| Khalid Reeves | PG | 67 | 17 | 1,462 | 186 | 288 | 77 | 10 | 619 | 21.8 | 2.8 | 4.3 | 1.1 | .1 | 9.2 |
| Kevin Willis^{†} | PF | 65 | 61 | 2,301 | 696 | 83 | 59 | 33 | 1,112 | 35.4 | 10.7 | 1.3 | .9 | .5 | 17.1 |
| Brad Lohaus | PF | 61 | 1 | 730 | 102 | 43 | 20 | 25 | 267 | 12.0 | 1.7 | .7 | .3 | .4 | 4.4 |
| Ledell Eackles | SG | 54 | 6 | 898 | 95 | 72 | 19 | 2 | 395 | 16.6 | 1.8 | 1.3 | .4 | .0 | 7.3 |
| Keith Askins | SF | 50 | 5 | 854 | 198 | 39 | 35 | 17 | 229 | 17.1 | 4.0 | .8 | .7 | .3 | 4.6 |
| Harold Miner | SG | 45 | 16 | 871 | 117 | 69 | 15 | 6 | 329 | 19.4 | 2.6 | 1.5 | .3 | .1 | 7.3 |
| Kevin Pritchard^{†} | PG | 14 | 0 | 158 | 11 | 23 | 2 | 1 | 43 | 11.3 | .8 | 1.6 | .1 | .1 | 3.1 |
| Steve Smith^{†} | SG | 2 | 2 | 62 | 6 | 7 | 2 | 1 | 41 | 31.0 | 3.0 | 3.5 | 1.0 | .5 | 20.5 |
| Grant Long^{†} | PF | 2 | 2 | 62 | 11 | 4 | 2 | 0 | 16 | 31.0 | 5.5 | 2.0 | 1.0 | .0 | 8.0 |

- ^{†} Denotes player spent time with another team in the season. Stats reflect time with the Heat only.

== Transactions ==
The Heat were involved in the following transactions during the 1994–95 season.

=== Trades ===
| November 2, 1994 | To Miami Heat Sasha Danilović; Billy Owens | To Golden State Warriors Rony Seikaly |

| November 7, 1994 | To Miami Heat Kevin Willis; 1996 first-round pick | To Atlanta Hawks Grant Long; Steve Smith; 1996 second-round pick |

=== Free agents ===
==== Additions ====
| Player | Signed | Former team |
| Ledell Eackles | September 30 | Rapid City Thrillers (CBA) |
| Jerome Harmon | October 4 | Unsigned |
| Kevin Pritchard | October 4 | Quad City Thunder (CBA) |
| Chucky Brown | October 4 | Yakima Sun Kings (CBA) |
| Steve Henson | October 4 | Mexico Aztecas (CBA) |
| Kevin Gamble | October 7 | Boston Celtics |
| Brad Lohaus | October 7 | Milwaukee Bucks |
| Kevin Pritchard | March 6 | Philadelphia 76ers |
| Kevin Pritchard | March 24 | Miami Heat |

==== Subtractions ====
| Player | Left | New team |
| Brian Shaw | free agency, September 22 | Orlando Magic |
| Jerome Harmon | waived, October 17 | Philadelphia 76ers |
| Steve Henson | waived, November 1 | Portland Trail Blazers |
| Chucky Brown | waived, November 1 | Houston Rockets |
| Kevin Pritchard | waived, November 1 | Philadelphia 76ers |
| Alec Kessler | waived, November 2 | Olimpia Stefanel Milano (Lega Basket Serie A) |
| Willie Burton | waived, November 3 | Philadelphia 76ers |
| Kevin Pritchard | waived, March 19 | Miami Heat |

Player Transactions Citation:
