= Joe Wolf =

American basketball coach and player (1964–2024)

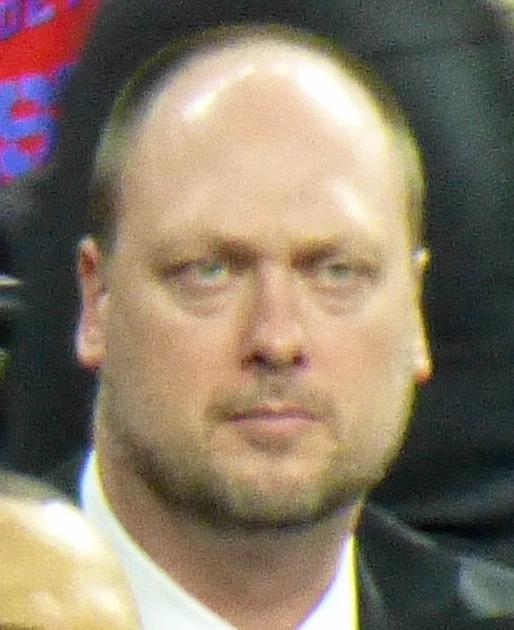
- Wolf in 2014

Personal information
- Born: December 17, 1964 Kohler, Wisconsin, U.S.
- Died: September 26, 2024 (aged 59) Kohler, Wisconsin, U.S.
- Listed height: 6 ft 11 in (2.11 m)
- Listed weight: 230 lb (104 kg)

Career information
- High school: Kohler (Kohler, Wisconsin)
- College: North Carolina (1983–1987)
- NBA draft: 1987: 1st round, 13th overall pick
- Drafted by: Los Angeles Clippers
- Playing career: 1987–1999
- Position: Power forward / center
- Number: 24, 42, 6, 43, 12, 23, 17, 30
- Coaching career: 2003–2024

Career history

Playing
- 1987–1990: Los Angeles Clippers
- 1990–1992: Denver Nuggets
- 1992: Boston Celtics
- 1992–1993: Portland Trail Blazers
- 1993–1994: León
- 1994–1995: Charlotte Hornets
- 1995–1996: Orlando Magic
- 1996–1997: Milwaukee Bucks
- 1997–1998: Denver Nuggets
- 1999: Charlotte Hornets

Coaching
- 2003–2004: William & Mary (assistant)
- 2004–2006: Idaho Stampede
- 2006–2008: Colorado 14ers
- 2008–2013: Milwaukee Bucks (assistant)
- 2014–2017: Brooklyn Nets (assistant)
- 2017–2018: UNC Wilmington (assistant)
- 2018–2020: Greensboro Swarm
- 2023–2024: Wisconsin Herd (assistant)

Career highlights
- First-team All-ACC (1987); McDonald's All-American (1983); First-team Parade All-American (1983); Wisconsin Mr. Basketball (1983)

Career NBA statistics
- Points: 2,485 (4.2 ppg)
- Rebounds: 1,933 (3.3 rpg)
- Stats at NBA.com
- Stats at Basketball Reference

Joseph James Wolf (December 17, 1964 – September 26, 2024) was an American professional basketball player and coach. Wolf played eleven seasons in the National Basketball Association (NBA) for seven different teams. He played college basketball for the North Carolina Tar Heels, where in 1987 he was named first-team All-ACC. Prior to UNC, Wolf was one of the most successful high school players in Wisconsin state history.

== Early life ==
Wolf was born on December 17, 1964, and raised in Kohler, Wisconsin. He led Kohler High School to three Wisconsin state basketball championships.

In February 2005, a vote was conducted by the Milwaukee Journal Sentinel to select the all-time Wisconsin high school boys basketball team. As a result of this vote. Wolf was named Wisconsin's all-time greatest high school basketball player based on his dominant four-year performance at Kohler High School.

He played college basketball at the University of North Carolina and reached the NCAA Division I men's basketball tournament all four years under coach Dean Smith. He earned the Carmichael-Cobb Award as UNC's outstanding defensive player and the Jimmie Dempsey Award as UNC's overall statistical leader as a senior in 1987. He was elected ACC First Team and ACC All-Tournament Team.

== Professional career ==
Wolf played in the National Basketball Association (NBA). He was the 13th overall pick of the 1987 NBA draft, selected by the Los Angeles Clippers. He averaged 4.2 points and 3.3 rebounds per game throughout an 11-year professional career.

== Post-playing career ==
Wolf served as head coach of the Idaho Stampede of the CBA and the Colorado 14ers of the NBA Development League. He also worked with the Milwaukee Bucks as an assistant coach to Scott Skiles. For the 2014–15 season, Wolf was hired by the Brooklyn Nets as an assistant to new head coach Lionel Hollins. In his first season with the team, Wolf and the coaching staff helped lead the Brooklyn Nets to the Eastern Conference Playoffs. After one season as an assistant at UNC Wilmington, he was hired as the head coach of the Greensboro Swarm of the NBA G League, the affiliate of the Charlotte Hornets. On June 30, 2020, the Swarm did not extend Wolf's contract.

On October 5, 2023, Wolf was hired as an assistant coach by the Wisconsin Herd of the NBA G League.

== Death ==
Wolf passed away on September 26, 2024, at the age of 59.

== Career statistics ==
Legend
GP	Games played	GS	Games started	MPG	Minutes per game
FG%	Field goal percentage	3P%	3-point field goal percentage	FT%	Free throw percentage
RPG	Rebounds per game	APG	Assists per game	SPG	Steals per game
BPG	Blocks per game	PPG	Points per game	**Bold**	Career high

=== NBA ===
==== Regular season ====
Year	Team	GP	GS	MPG	FG%	3P%	FT%	RPG	APG	SPG	BPG	PPG
1987–88	L. A. Clippers	42	26	**27.1**	.407	.200	.833	4.5	**2.3**	0.9	0.4	**7.6**
1988–89	L. A. Clippers	66	15	22.0	.423	.143	.688	4.1	1.7	0.5	0.2	5.8
1989–90	L. A. Clippers	**77**	19	17.2	.395	.200	.775	3.0	0.8	0.4	0.3	4.8
1990–91	Denver	74	**38**	21.5	.451	.133	.831	**5.4**	1.4	0.8	0.4	7.3
1991–92	Denver	67	0	17.3	.361	.091	.803	3.6	0.9	0.5	0.2	3.8
1992–93	Boston	2	0	4.5	.000	.000	.500	1.5	0.0	0.0	**0.5**	0.5
1992–93	Portland	21	0	7.4	.465	.000	**.857**	2.1	0.2	0.3	0.0	2.5
1994–95	Charlotte	63	6	9.3	.469	**.333**	.750	2.0	0.6	0.1	0.1	1.4
1995–96	Charlotte	1	0	18.0	.000	.000	.000	2.0	0.0	**2.0**	0.0	0.0
1995–96	Orlando	63	8	16.6	**.515**	.000	.724	2.9	1.0	0.2	0.1	4.6
1996–97	Milwaukee	56	7	9.4	.449	.143	.737	2.0	0.4	0.3	0.2	1.7
1997–98	Denver	57	8	10.9	.331	.200	.500	2.2	0.5	0.4	0.1	1.5
1998–99	Charlotte	3	0	4.0	.000	.000	.000	0.3	0.0	0.0	0.0	0.0
Career		592	127	16.3	.423	.164	.770	3.3	1.0	0.4	0.2	4.2

==== Playoffs ====
Year	Team	GP	GS	MPG	FG%	3P%	FT%	RPG	APG	SPG	BPG	PPG
1992–93	Portland	2	0	**10.0**	**.500**	.000	.000	**2.0**	0.0	0.0	**0.5**	1.0
1994–95	Charlotte	1	0	3.0	.000	.000	.000	0.0	0.0	0.0	0.0	0.0
1995–96	Orlando	**11**	0	7.7	.348	**.333**	**.750**	0.5	**0.2**	**0.1**	0.0	**1.8**
Career		14	0	7.7	.360	.333	.750	0.7	0.1	0.1	0.1	1.6

=== College ===
Year	Team	GP	GS	MPG	FG%	3P%	FT%	RPG	APG	SPG	BPG	PPG
1983–84	North Carolina	30	–	13.7	.481	–	.758	2.8	0.5	0.2	0.1	3.4
1984–85	North Carolina	30	–	**30.5**	.566	–	.781	5.3	1.9	0.6	**0.5**	9.1
1985–86	North Carolina	**34**	**34**	25.1	.532	–	.712	6.6	2.1	0.5	0.3	10.0
1986–87	North Carolina	**34**	**34**	29.6	**.571**	**.575**	**.793**	**7.1**	**2.9**	**1.3**	0.3	**15.2**
Career		128	68	24.9	.551	.575	.765	5.5	1.9	0.7	0.3	9.6
