= 1994–95 Philadelphia 76ers season =

Season of National Basketball Association team the Philadelphia 76ers

- Head coach: John Lucas
- General manager: John Lucas
- Owner: Harold Katz
- Arena: CoreStates Spectrum

Results
- Record: 24–58 (.293)
- Place: Division: 6th (Atlantic); Conference: 13th (Eastern)
- Playoff finish: Did not qualify
- Stats at Basketball Reference

Local media
- Television: WPHL-TV; SportsChannel Philadelphia; PRISM
- Radio: WIP

The 1994–95 Philadelphia 76ers season was the 46th season for the Philadelphia 76ers in the National Basketball Association, and their 32nd season in Philadelphia, Pennsylvania.

== Season summary ==
=== Off-season ===
The 76ers received the sixth overall pick in the 1994 NBA draft, and selected power forward Sharone Wright out of Clemson University. During the off-season, the team signed free agents Scott Williams, Jeff Grayer, undrafted rookie power forward Derrick Alston, and then signed Willie Burton during the first month of the regular season. The 76ers also hired John Lucas as their new head coach and General Manager.

For the season, the 76ers redesigned their home and road uniforms, which featured the team nickname "Sixers" on the front of their jerseys, slated blue side panels on their jerseys and shorts, and the team's primary logo on the right leg of their shorts. The white home uniforms featured a white and red trim, and white and red outlines next to the side panels, while the red road uniforms featured a red and white trim, and red and white outlines. The team's new uniforms would remain in use until 1997.

=== Regular season ===
Under Lucas and with the addition of Wright, Burton and Williams, the 76ers struggled losing six of their first seven games of the regular season. After a 10–16 start to the season, the team posted a nine-game losing streak between December and January, as Jeff Malone only played just 19 games due to a sprained ankle injury, and was out for the remainder of the season. After holding a 14–34 record at the All-Star break, the 76ers posted an eight-game losing streak in March, and finished in sixth place in the Atlantic Division with a 24–58 record.

Dana Barros averaged 20.6 points, 7.5 assists and 1.8 steals per game, and led the 76ers with 197 three-point field goals; he shot .464 in three-point field-goal percentage, shot .899 in free-throw percentage, and was named the NBA Most Improved Player of the Year. In addition, Malone averaged 18.4 points per game, while Clarence Weatherspoon provided the team with 18.1 points, 6.9 rebounds and 1.5 steals per game, and Burton contributed 15.3 points per game and 106 three-point field goals. Meanwhile, Wright provided with 11.4 points, 6.0 rebounds and 1.3 blocks per game, and was named to the NBA All-Rookie Second Team, and second-year star Shawn Bradley played a full season, averaging 9.5 points, 8.0 rebounds and 3.3 blocks per game. Grayer contributed 8.3 points per game in only just 47 games, Williams provided with 6.4 points and 6.3 rebounds per game, and Alston averaged 4.7 points and 3.4 rebounds per game.

During the NBA All-Star weekend at the America West Arena in Phoenix, Arizona, Barros was selected for the 1995 NBA All-Star Game, as a member of the Eastern Conference All-Star team; it was his first and only All-Star appearance. In addition, Barros also participated in the NBA Three-Point Shootout for the third consecutive year, while Wright was selected for the NBA Rookie Game, as a member of the Green team, and Tim Perry participated in the NBA Slam Dunk Contest for the third time.

The 76ers finished 25th in the NBA in home-game attendance, with an attendance of 507,806 at the CoreStates Spectrum during the regular season, which was the third-lowest in the league.

=== Aftermath ===
Following the season, Barros signed as a free agent with the Boston Celtics, while Burton and Grayer were both released to free agency, and first-round draft pick B.J. Tyler was left unprotected in the 1995 NBA expansion draft, where he was selected by the Toronto Raptors expansion team.

== Offseason ==
=== Draft picks ===
Round	Pick	Player	Position	Nationality	School/Club team
1	6	Sharone Wright	PF/C	United States	Clemson
1	20	B.J. Tyler	PG	United States	University of Texas at Austin

== Roster ==
1994–95 Philadelphia 76ers roster
Players

Pos.	No.	Player	Height	Weight	DOB	From
C	21	Derrick Alston	6 ft 11 in (2.11 m)	225 lb (102 kg)	––	Duquesne
G	3	Dana Barros	5 ft 11 in (1.80 m)	163 lb (74 kg)	––	Boston College
C	76	Shawn Bradley	7 ft 6 in (2.29 m)	235 lb (107 kg)	––	BYU
F	9	Willie Burton (injured)	6 ft 8 in (2.03 m)	210 lb (95 kg)	––	Minnesota
G	5	Corey Gaines	6 ft 3 in (1.91 m)	195 lb (88 kg)	––	Loyola Marymount
G	20	Greg Graham	6 ft 4 in (1.93 m)	174 lb (79 kg)	––	Indiana
G	14	Jeff Grayer	6 ft 5 in (1.96 m)	200 lb (91 kg)	––	Iowa State
G	25	Jeff Malone (injured)	6 ft 4 in (1.93 m)	205 lb (93 kg)	––	Mississippi State
F	23	Tim Perry	6 ft 9 in (2.06 m)	200 lb (91 kg)	––	Temple
G	1	B. J. Tyler	6 ft 1 in (1.85 m)	185 lb (84 kg)	––	Texas
F	35	Clarence Weatherspoon	6 ft 6 in (1.98 m)	240 lb (109 kg)	––	Southern Miss
C	42	Scott Williams	6 ft 10 in (2.08 m)	230 lb (104 kg)	––	North Carolina
F	4	Sharone Wright	6 ft 11 in (2.11 m)	260 lb (118 kg)	––	Clemson

Coaches
Head coach
- John Lucas II
Assistant(s)
- Ron Adams
- Maurice Cheeks
- Tom Thibodeau

Legend
- (DP) Unsigned draft pick
- (FA) Free agent
- (S) Suspended
- Injured

Roster

=== Roster Notes ===
- Center Shawn Bradley was raised in the U.S., but played for Germany internationally.

== Regular season ==
=== Season standings ===
Atlantic Division	W	L	PCT	GB	Home	Road	Div
c-Orlando Magic	57	25	.695	—	39–2	18–23	18–10
x-New York Knicks	55	27	.671	2	29–12	26–15	23–5
x-Boston Celtics	35	47	.427	22	20–21	15–26	14–14
Miami Heat	32	50	.390	25	22–19	10–31	9–19
New Jersey Nets	30	52	.366	27	20–21	10–31	13–15
Philadelphia 76ers	24	58	.293	33	14–27	10–31	12–16
Washington Bullets	21	61	.256	36	13–28	8–33	9–19

#	Eastern Conference				
#	Team	W	L	PCT	GB
1	c-Orlando Magic	57	25	.695	–
2	y-Indiana Pacers	52	30	.634	5
3	x-New York Knicks	55	27	.671	2
4	x-Charlotte Hornets	50	32	.610	7
5	x-Chicago Bulls	47	35	.573	10
6	x-Cleveland Cavaliers	43	39	.524	14
7	x-Atlanta Hawks	42	40	.512	15
8	x-Boston Celtics	35	47	.427	22
9	Milwaukee Bucks	34	48	.415	23
10	Miami Heat	32	50	.390	25
11	New Jersey Nets	30	52	.366	27
12	Detroit Pistons	28	54	.341	29
13	Philadelphia 76ers	24	58	.293	33
14	Washington Bullets	21	61	.256	36

z - clinched division title
y - clinched division title
x - clinched playoff spot

== Game log ==
=== Regular season ===
1994–95 game log
Total: 24–58 (Home: 12–29; Road: 12–29)
November: 4–8 (home: 1–6; road: 3–2)

Game	Date	Team	Score	High points	High rebounds	High assists	Location Attendance	Record
2	November 5, 1994	@ Orlando	L 107–122				Orlando Arena	0–2
6	November 12, 1994	Orlando	L 103–116				CoreStates Spectrum	1–5

December: 6–10 (home: 2–5; road: 4–5)

Game	Date	Team	Score	High points	High rebounds	High assists	Location Attendance	Record
17	December 9, 1994	Indiana	L 88–94				CoreStates Spectrum	7–10

January: 2–13 (home: 1–6; road: 1–7)

Game	Date	Team	Score	High points	High rebounds	High assists	Location Attendance	Record
34	January 14, 1995	@ Orlando	L 70–91				Orlando Arena	10–24
42	January 28, 1995	@ Indiana	L 103–106 (OT)				Market Square Arena	12–30

February: 4–9 (home: 2–3; road: 2–6)

Game	Date	Team	Score	High points	High rebounds	High assists	Location Attendance	Record
All-Star Break
50	February 17, 1995	@ Orlando	L 83–129				Orlando Arena	14–36

March: 4–10 (home: 3–7; road: 1–3)

Game	Date	Team	Score	High points	High rebounds	High assists	Location Attendance	Record
60	March 10, 1995	San Antonio	L 94–100				CoreStates Spectrum	17–43
62	March 14, 1995; 7:30 p.m. EST	Houston	L 107–136	Barros (50)	Weatherspoon (8)	Barros (8)	CoreStates Spectrum; 11,484	17–45
63	March 16, 1995	@ San Antonio	L 86–112				Alamodome	17–46
65	March 19, 1995; 3:30 p.m. EST	@ Houston	L 103–114	Weatherspoon (25)	Bradley (12)	Barros (10)	The Summit; 16,611	17–48
68	March 25, 1995	Indiana	L 75–84				CoreStates Spectrum	18–50

April: 4–8 (home: 3–2; road: 1–6)

Game	Date	Team	Score	High points	High rebounds	High assists	Location Attendance	Record
75	April 8, 1995	Orlando	W 109–99				CoreStates Spectrum	21–54
80	April 19, 1995	@ Indiana	L 91–103				Market Square Arena	23–57

1994–95 schedule

== Player statistics ==
Legend
GP	Games played	GS	Games started	MPG	Minutes per game
FG%	Field-goal percentage	3P%	3-point field-goal percentage	FT%	Free-throw percentage
RPG	Rebounds per game	APG	Assists per game	SPG	Steals per game
BPG	Blocks per game	PPG	Points per game

=== Regular season ===
Player	GP	GS	MPG	FG%	3P%	FT%	RPG	APG	SPG	BPG	PPG
Alaa Abdelnaby^{†}	3	0	10.0	.091			2.7	.0	.0	.0	.7
Derrick Alston	64	1	16.1	.465	.000	.492	3.4	.5	.6	.5	4.7
Dana Barros	82	82	40.5	.490	.464	.899	3.3	7.5	1.8	.0	20.6
Shawn Bradley	82	59	28.8	.455	.000	.638	8.0	.6	.7	3.3	9.5
Willie Burton	53	31	29.5	.401	.385	.824	3.1	1.8	.6	.4	15.3
Lloyd Daniels^{†}	5	0	12.6	.333	.214	1.000	1.4	.8	.4	.0	4.6
Alphonso Ford	5	0	19.6	.231	.000	.500	4.0	1.8	.2	.0	3.8
Corey Gaines	11	8	25.5	.471	.133	.455	1.6	3.0	.7	.1	5.0
Greg Graham	50	7	15.5	.426	.214	.753	1.2	1.3	.6	.1	5.0
Jeff Grayer	47	25	23.4	.428	.333	.699	3.2	1.6	.6	.1	8.3
Jerome Harmon	10	0	15.8	.396	1.000	.500	2.3	1.2	.9	.0	4.6
Jaren Jackson	21	1	12.2	.368	.267	.667	2.0	.9	.4	.2	3.3
Jeff Malone	19	19	34.7	.507	.393	.864	2.9	1.5	.8	.0	18.4
Tim Perry	42	1	10.6	.346	.000	.550	2.1	.3	.2	.4	1.8
Kevin Pritchard^{†}	5	0	7.2	.000	.000	.250	.2	2.2	.0	.0	.2
B. J. Tyler	55	8	14.7	.381	.314	.700	1.1	3.2	.7	.0	3.5
Clarence Weatherspoon	76	76	39.4	.439	.190	.751	6.9	2.8	1.5	.9	18.1
Scott Williams	77	43	23.1	.475	.000	.738	6.3	.8	.9	.5	6.4
Sharone Wright	79	49	25.9	.465	.000	.645	6.0	.6	.5	1.3	11.4

- ^{†} Denotes player spent time with another team in the season. Stats reflect time with the 7ers only.

Player statistics citation:

== Awards and honors ==
- Dana Barros, Most Improved Player of the Year
- Sharone Wright, NBA All-Rookie Team, Second Team

== Transactions ==
The 76ers were involved in the following transactions during the 1994–95 season.

=== Trades ===
July 25, 1994	To Philadelphia 76ers 1996 second-round pick	To Detroit Pistons Eric Leckner

=== Free agents ===
==== Additions ====
Player	Signed	Former team
Scott Williams	July 28	Chicago Bulls
Tate George	October 5	Quad City Thunder (CBA)
Steve Bardo	October 6	Wichita Falls Texans (CBA)
Lloyd Daniels	October 8	San Antonio Spurs
Willie Burton	November 8	Miami Heat
Jaren Jackson	November 15	Portland Trail Blazers
Jeff Grayer	January 5	Golden State Warriors
Kevin Pritchard	February 15	Quad City Thunder (CBA)
Jerome Harmon	February 17	Unsigned
Alaa Abdelnaby	March 24	Sacramento Kings
Alphonso Ford	March 27	Tri-City Chinook (CBA)
Corey Gaines	April 4	Scavolini Pesaro (LBA)

==== Subtractions ====
Player	Left	New team
Moses Malone	waived, June 17	San Antonio Spurs
Isaac Austin	released, July 28	CRO Lyon (France)
Johnny Dawkins	waived, October 6	Detroit Pistons
Steve Bardo	waived, October 27	Chicago Rockers (CBA)
Tate George	waived, November 7	Milwaukee Bucks
Lloyd Daniels	waived, November 14	Limoges CSP (LNB Pro A)
Jaren Jackson	waived, January 4	Pittsburgh Piranhas (CBA)
Alaa Abdelnaby	waived, April 12	Papagou B.C. (Greece)
Alphonso Ford	waived, April 14	Grupo AGB Huesca (LEB Oro)

Player Transactions Citation:

== See also ==
- 1994-95 NBA season
