= 1994–95 Boston Celtics season =

NBA basketball team season

- Head coach: Chris Ford
- General manager: M.L. Carr
- Arena: Boston Garden; Hartford Civic Center

Results
- Record: 35–47 (.427)
- Place: Division: 3rd (Atlantic); Conference: 8th (Eastern)
- Playoff finish: East First Round (lost to Magic 1–3)
- Stats at Basketball Reference

Local media
- Television: WSBK-TV; SportsChannel New England
- Radio: WBNW

The 1994–95 Boston Celtics season was the 49th season for the Boston Celtics in the National Basketball Association. This was the Celtics' first season since the 1979–80 season without long-time center Robert Parish, who left as a free agent to the Charlotte Hornets. It was also the team's final season in which they played their home games at the Boston Garden, as well as playing occasional home games at the Hartford Civic Center in Hartford, Connecticut.

== Season summary ==
=== Off-season ===
After missing the NBA playoffs the previous season, the Celtics received the ninth overall pick in the 1994 NBA draft, and selected center Eric Montross from the University of North Carolina. During the off-season, the Celtics signed free agent All-Star forward Dominique Wilkins, which was a controversial move, signed free agents Pervis Ellison, second-year guard David Wesley, and rookie shooting guard Greg Minor from the University of Louisville; the team also acquired Blue Edwards and Derek Strong from the Milwaukee Bucks on draft day.

=== Regular season ===
With the addition of Wilkins and Montross, the Celtics got off to a 7–6 start in November, but played below .500 in winning percentage for the remainder of the regular season. The team posted a six-game losing streak in January, and later on held a 19–27 record at the All-Star break. At mid-season, the team traded Edwards back to his former team, the Utah Jazz in exchange for Jay Humphries. The Celtics posted another six-game losing streak in March, but won eight of their final twelve games of the season, finishing in third place in the Atlantic Division with a 35–47 record; despite finishing six games under .500, the team qualified for the NBA playoffs as the eighth seed in the Eastern Conference.

Wilkins averaged 17.8 points and 5.2 rebounds per game along with 112 three-point field goals, while second-year star Dino Radja averaged 17.2 points, 8.7 rebounds and 1.3 blocks per game, and Dee Brown provided the team with 15.6 points and 1.4 steals per game, and also led them with 126 three-point field goals. In addition, Sherman Douglas contributed 14.7 points and 6.9 assists per game, while Montross averaged 10.0 points and 7.3 rebounds per game, and was named to the NBA All-Rookie Second Team. Off the bench, Rick Fox contributed 8.8 points per game, but only played 53 games due to ankle and foot injuries, while Xavier McDaniel provided with 8.6 points and 4.4 rebounds per game. Meanwhile, Wesley contributed 7.4 points, 5.2 assists and 1.6 steals per game in only 51 games, starting in 36 of them due to a knee injury, while Ellison averaged 6.8 points and 5.6 rebounds per game, Strong provided with 6.3 points and 5.4 rebounds per game, and Minor contributed 6.0 points per game.

During the NBA All-Star weekend at the America West Arena in Phoenix, Arizona, Montross was selected for the NBA Rookie Game, as a member of the White team. Wilkins was not selected for the NBA All-Star Game for the first time since the 1984–85 season; he had nine consecutive All-Star appearances while playing for his former team, the Atlanta Hawks. The Celtics finished 20th in the NBA in home-game attendance, with an attendance of 606,070 at the Boston Garden during the regular season.

=== NBA playoffs ===
In the Eastern Conference First Round of the 1995 NBA playoffs, the Celtics faced off against the top–seeded, and Atlantic Division champion Orlando Magic, who were led by the All-Star trio of Shaquille O'Neal, second-year star Penny Hardaway, and Horace Grant. The Celtics suffered a 47-point margin loss in Game 1 to the Magic, 124–77 at the Orlando Arena, but managed to defeat them in Game 2 on the road, 99–92, seizing the "theoretical home court advantage" for the series. However, the Celtics lost the next two games at home, which included a Game 4 loss to the Magic at the Boston Garden, 95–92, thus losing the series in four games; Game 4 was the last basketball game ever played at the Boston Garden.

The Magic would advance to the NBA Finals for the first time in franchise history, but would lose to the 6th–seeded, and defending NBA champion Houston Rockets in a four-game sweep in the 1995 NBA Finals.

=== Aftermath ===
Following the season, Wilkins and McDaniel both left to play overseas in Greece, while Strong signed as a free agent with the Los Angeles Lakers, Humphries was released to free agency, and head coach Chris Ford was fired; General Manager M.L. Carr explained Ford's firing as having to do with "diminishing returns".

== Draft picks ==
Round	Pick	Player	Position	Nationality	College
1	9	Eric Montross	C	United States	North Carolina
2	36	Andrei Fetisov	SF	Russia	Fórum Valladolid

== Roster ==
1994–95 Boston Celtics roster
Players

Pos.	No.	Player	Height	Weight	DOB	From
G	8	James Blackwell	6 ft 0 in (1.83 m)	190 lb (86 kg)	1968–02–25	Dartmouth
G	7	Dee Brown	6 ft 1 in (1.85 m)	160 lb (73 kg)	1968–11–29	Jacksonville
F	45	Tony Dawson	6 ft 7 in (2.01 m)	215 lb (98 kg)	1967–08–25	Florida State
G	20	Sherman Douglas	6 ft 0 in (1.83 m)	180 lb (82 kg)	1966–09–15	Syracuse
F	55	Acie Earl	6 ft 10 in (2.08 m)	240 lb (109 kg)	1970–06–23	Iowa
F	29	Pervis Ellison	6 ft 9 in (2.06 m)	210 lb (95 kg)	1967–04–03	Louisville
F	44	Rick Fox	6 ft 7 in (2.01 m)	230 lb (104 kg)	1969–07–24	North Carolina
G	5	Jay Humphries	6 ft 3 in (1.91 m)	185 lb (84 kg)	1962–10–17	Colorado
F	34	Xavier McDaniel	6 ft 7 in (2.01 m)	205 lb (93 kg)	1963–06–04	Wichita State
F	9	Greg Minor	6 ft 6 in (1.98 m)	210 lb (95 kg)	1971–09–18	Louisville
C	0	Eric Montross	7 ft 0 in (2.13 m)	270 lb (122 kg)	1971–09–23	North Carolina
F/C	40	Dino Radja	6 ft 11 in (2.11 m)	225 lb (102 kg)	1967–04–24	Croatia
F	31	Derek Strong	6 ft 8 in (2.03 m)	220 lb (100 kg)	1968–02–09	Xavier
G	4	David Wesley	6 ft 0 in (1.83 m)	190 lb (86 kg)	1970–11–14	Baylor
F	12	Dominique Wilkins	6 ft 7 in (2.01 m)	200 lb (91 kg)	1960–01–12	Georgia

Coaches
Head coach
- Chris Ford
Assistant(s)
- Don Casey
- Dennis Johnson

Legend
- (DP) Unsigned draft pick
- (FA) Free agent
- (S) Suspended
- Injured

Roster

== Regular season ==
=== Season standings ===
Atlantic Division	W	L	PCT	GB	Home	Road	Div
c-Orlando Magic	57	25	.695	—	39–2	18–23	18–10
x-New York Knicks	55	27	.671	2	29–12	26–15	23–5
x-Boston Celtics	35	47	.427	22	20–21	15–26	14–14
Miami Heat	32	50	.390	25	22–19	10–31	9–19
New Jersey Nets	30	52	.366	27	20–21	10–31	13–15
Philadelphia 76ers	24	58	.293	33	14–27	10–31	12–16
Washington Bullets	21	61	.256	36	13–28	8–33	9–19

#	Eastern Conference				
#	Team	W	L	PCT	GB
1	c-Orlando Magic	57	25	.695	–
2	y-Indiana Pacers	52	30	.634	5
3	x-New York Knicks	55	27	.671	2
4	x-Charlotte Hornets	50	32	.610	7
5	x-Chicago Bulls	47	35	.573	10
6	x-Cleveland Cavaliers	43	39	.524	14
7	x-Atlanta Hawks	42	40	.512	15
8	x-Boston Celtics	35	47	.427	22
9	Milwaukee Bucks	34	48	.415	23
10	Miami Heat	32	50	.390	25
11	New Jersey Nets	30	52	.366	27
12	Detroit Pistons	28	54	.341	29
13	Philadelphia 76ers	24	58	.293	33
14	Washington Bullets	21	61	.256	36

== Game log ==
=== Regular season ===
1994–95 game log
Total: 35–47 (home: 20–21; road: 15–26)
November: 7–6 (home: 3–4; road: 4–2)

Game	Date	Team	Score	High points	High rebounds	High assists	Location Attendance	Record
3	November 11, 1994; 7:30 p.m. EST	Houston	L 82–102	Radja (31)	Radja (11)	Fox (6)	Boston Garden; 14,890	0–3

December: 4–11 (home: 2–4; road: 2–7)

Game	Date	Team	Score	High points	High rebounds	High assists	Location Attendance	Record
23	December 17, 1994; 8:30 p.m. EST	@ Houston	W 112–109	Wilkins (43)	Montross (12)	Wesley (11)	The Summit; 15,757	10–13

January: 5–9 (home: 5–5; road: 0–4)

Game	Date	Team	Score	High points	High rebounds	High assists	Location Attendance	Record

February: 6–6 (home: 3–2; road: 3–4)

Game	Date	Team	Score	High points	High rebounds	High assists	Location Attendance	Record
All-Star Break

March: 6–11 (home: 2–5; road: 4–6)

Game	Date	Team	Score	High points	High rebounds	High assists	Location Attendance	Record

April: 7–4 (home: 5–1; road: 2–3)

Game	Date	Team	Score	High points	High rebounds	High assists	Location Attendance	Record

1994–95 schedule

== Playoffs ==
1995 playoff game log
First round: 1–3 (home: 0–2; road: 1–1)

Game	Date	Team	Score	High points	High rebounds	High assists	Location Attendance	Series
1	April 28	@ Orlando	L 77–124	Dee Brown (20)	Dominique Wilkins (9)	Sherman Douglas (6)	Orlando Arena; 16,010	0–1
2	April 30	@ Orlando	W 99–92	Dominique Wilkins (24)	Brown, Radja (8)	Sherman Douglas (15)	Orlando Arena; 16,010	1–1
3	May 3	Orlando	L 77–82	Brown, Wilkins (16)	Pervis Ellison (10)	Sherman Douglas (7)	Boston Garden; 14,890	1–2
4	May 5	Orlando	L 92–95	Dominique Wilkins (22)	Dominique Wilkins (18)	Douglas, Brown (5)	Boston Garden; 14,890	1–3

1995 schedule

== Player statistics ==
Legend
GP	Games played	GS	Games started	MPG	Minutes per game
FG%	Field-goal percentage	3P%	3-point field-goal percentage	FT%	Free-throw percentage
RPG	Rebounds per game	APG	Assists per game	SPG	Steals per game
BPG	Blocks per game	PPG	Points per game

=== Regular season ===
Boston Celtics statistics
Player	GP	GS	MPG	FG%	3P%	FT%	RPG	APG	SPG	BPG	PPG
James Blackwell^{†}	9	0	6.8	.600		.667	.9	.7	.3	.0	1.6
Dee Brown	79	69	35.3	.447	.385	.852	3.2	3.8	1.4	.6	15.6
Tony Dawson	2	0	6.5	.375	.333	1.000	1.5	.5	.0	.0	4.0
Sherman Douglas	65	43	31.5	.475	.244	.689	2.6	6.9	1.2	.0	14.7
Acie Earl	30	3	6.9	.382		.483	1.5	.1	.2	.3	2.2
Blue Edwards^{†}	31	7	16.4	.426	.256	.896	2.1	1.5	.6	.3	7.1
Pervis Ellison	55	11	19.7	.507	.000	.717	5.6	.6	.4	1.0	6.8
Rick Fox	53	7	19.6	.481	.413	.772	2.9	2.6	1.0	.4	8.8
Tony Harris	3	0	6.0	.375	.000	.889	.0	.0	.0	.0	4.7
Jay Humphries^{†}	6	0	8.7	.444	.000	.500	.5	1.7	.3	.0	1.7
Xavier McDaniel	68	15	21.0	.451	.286	.712	4.4	1.6	.4	.3	8.6
Greg Minor	63	8	15.0	.515	.167	.833	2.2	1.0	.5	.3	6.0
Eric Montross	78	75	29.7	.534	.000	.635	7.3	.5	.4	.8	10.0
Dino Rađa	66	48	32.5	.490	.000	.759	8.7	1.7	.9	1.3	17.2
Derek Strong	70	24	19.2	.453	.286	.820	5.4	.6	.3	.2	6.3
David Wesley	51	36	27.1	.409	.429	.755	2.3	5.2	1.6	.2	7.4
Dominique Wilkins	77	64	31.5	.424	.388	.782	5.2	2.2	.8	.2	17.8

=== Playoffs ===
Boston Celtics statistics
Player	GP	GS	MPG	FG%	3P%	FT%	RPG	APG	SPG	BPG	PPG
Dee Brown	4	4	43.0	.419	.346	.875	5.0	4.8	1.3	.3	18.8
Sherman Douglas	4	4	42.0	.353	.333	.727	5.0	8.3	1.0	.3	15.0
Acie Earl	1	0	10.0	.333		.000	2.0	.0	.0	1.0	2.0
Pervis Ellison	4	0	17.0	.579		1.000	4.3	.5	.5	1.3	6.0
Xavier McDaniel	4	0	14.8	.294	.000	.750	1.5	1.3	.0	.0	3.3
Greg Minor	4	0	9.3	.385		1.000	.3	.5	.3	.3	2.8
Eric Montross	4	4	15.5	.455		.500	2.3	.0	.0	.0	3.3
Dino Rađa	4	3	38.3	.400		.714	7.0	2.3	1.0	1.3	15.0
Derek Strong	4	1	20.3	.333		.500	6.0	.8	.8	.3	2.8
Dominique Wilkins	4	4	37.5	.426	.471	.889	10.8	2.0	.5	.8	19.0

- ^{†} Denotes player spent time with another team in the season. Stats reflect time with the Celtics only.

Player statistics citation:

== Awards ==
Player	Award
Eric Montross	NBA All-Rookie 2nd Team

== Transactions ==
The Celtics were involved in the following transactions during the 1994–95 season.

=== Trades ===
June 29, 1994	To Boston Celtics Blue Edwards; Derek Strong	To Milwaukee Bucks Ed Pinckney; Andrei Fetisov
February 3, 1995	To Boston Celtics Jay Humphries; 1995 second-round pick	To Utah Jazz Blue Edwards

=== Free agents ===
==== Additions ====
Player	Signed	Former team
David Wesley	July 20	New Jersey Nets
Dominique Wilkins	July 25	Los Angeles Clippers
Pervis Ellison	August 1	Washington Bullets
Greg Minor	October 19	Indiana Pacers
James Blackwell	February 28	Pittsburgh Piranhas (CBA)
Tony Dawson	February 28	Rockford Lightning (CBA)

==== Subtractions ====
Player	Left	New team
Alaa Abdelnaby	free agency, July 26	Sacramento Kings
Robert Parish	free agency, August 4	Charlotte Hornets
Tony Harris	waived, December 28	Sioux Falls Skyforce (CBA)

Player Transactions Citation:

== See also ==
- 1994–95 NBA season
