= 1994–95 Indiana Pacers season =

NBA professional basketball team season

- Division champions
- Head coach: Larry Brown
- General manager: Donnie Walsh
- Owner: Herbert Simon
- Arena: Market Square Arena

Results
- Record: 52–30 (.634)
- Place: Division: 1st (Central); Conference: 2nd (Eastern)
- Playoff finish: Eastern Conference finals (lost to Magic 3–4)
- Stats at Basketball Reference

Local media
- Television: WTTV; Prime Sports Midwest
- Radio: WNDE

The 1994–95 Indiana Pacers season was the 19th season for the Indiana Pacers in the National Basketball Association, and their 28th season as a franchise.

== Season summary ==
=== Off-season ===
After appearing in their first Conference Finals last season, the Pacers acquired Mark Jackson from the Los Angeles Clippers, and signed free agent Duane Ferrell during the off-season.

=== Regular season ===
With the addition of Jackson, the Pacers got off to a solid 14–6 start to the regular season, and later on held a 27–19 record at the All-Star break. The team posted a 25–11 record for the remainder of the season, which included a seven-game winning streak in February. The Pacers finished in first place in the Central Division with a 52–30 record, earned the second seed in the Eastern Conference, and won their first Division title since joining the NBA; the team qualified for the NBA playoffs for the sixth consecutive year.

Reggie Miller averaged 19.6 points per game, led the Pacers with 195 three-point field goals, and was named to the All-NBA Third Team, while Rik Smits averaged 17.9 points and 7.7 rebounds per game, and Derrick McKey provided the team with 13.3 points, 4.9 rebounds and 1.5 steals per game, and was named to the NBA All-Defensive Second Team. In addition, Dale Davis provided with 10.6 points, 9.4 rebounds and 1.6 blocks per game, while Jackson contributed 7.6 points, 7.5 assists and 1.3 steals per game. Off the bench, sixth man Byron Scott contributed 10.0 points per game, while second-year forward Antonio Davis averaged 7.6 points and 6.4 rebounds per game, but only played just 44 games due to a back injury, Sam Mitchell contributed 6.5 points per game, and Haywoode Workman averaged 4.2 points and 2.8 assists per game.

During the NBA All-Star weekend at the America West Arena in Phoenix, Arizona, Miller was selected for the 1995 NBA All-Star Game, as a member of the Eastern Conference All-Star team; it was his second All-Star appearance, and his first since 1990. In addition, Miller also participated in the NBA Three-Point Shootout for the fourth time. Smits finished tied in ninth place in Most Improved Player voting, while McKey finished tied in sixth place in Defensive Player of the Year voting, and Scott finished in sixth place in Sixth Man of the Year voting.

The Pacers finished 16th in the NBA in home-game attendance, with an attendance of 654,428 at the Market Square Arena during the regular season.

=== NBA playoffs ===
In the Eastern Conference First Round of the 1995 NBA playoffs, and for the second consecutive year, the Pacers faced off against the 7th–seeded Atlanta Hawks, a team that featured All-Star guard Mookie Blaylock, Steve Smith and Stacey Augmon. The Pacers won the first two games over the Hawks at home at the Market Square Arena, before winning Game 3 on the road, 105–89 at the Omni Coliseum to win the series in a three-game sweep.

In the Eastern Conference Semi-finals, and for the third consecutive year, the Pacers faced off against the 3rd–seeded New York Knicks, who were led by All-Star center Patrick Ewing, All-Star guard John Starks, and Sixth Man of the Year, Anthony Mason. Despite the Pacers winning the Central Division title, the Knicks had home-court advantage in the series since they finished with a better regular-season record. In Game 1 at Madison Square Garden, the Pacers were down by six points with 16.4 seconds left; Miller would single-handedly stun the Knicks by nailing a three-point shot, and then stealing the inbounds pass and tying the game with another three-pointer. Knicks fan and film director Spike Lee was just a few feet away. Miller would add two free throws and give the Pacers a legendary comeback win, 107–105. The Pacers then lost Game 2 to the Knicks, 96–77, as the series moved to the Market Square Arena; after four games, the Pacers took a 3–1 series lead. However, the Knicks managed to win the next two games to force a Game 7 at Madison Square Garden. The Pacers won Game 7 over the Knicks at Madison Square Garden, 97–95, as Ewing's last-second shot did not go in the basket; the Pacers defeated the Knicks in a hard-fought seven-game series.

In their second appearance in the Eastern Conference Finals, and also for the second consecutive year, the Pacers faced off against the top–seeded, and Atlantic Division champion Orlando Magic, who were led by the All-Star trio of Shaquille O'Neal, second-year star Penny Hardaway, and Horace Grant. The Magic took a 3–2 series lead, but the Pacers managed to win Game 6 at the Market Square Arena, 123–96 to even the series. However, the Pacers lost Game 7 to the Magic on the road, 105–81 at the Orlando Arena, thus losing in a hard-fought seven-game series; the home team won every game in this series.

The Magic would advance to the NBA Finals for the first time in franchise history, but would lose to the 6th–seeded, and defending NBA champion Houston Rockets in a four-game sweep in the 1995 NBA Finals. The Pacers were familiar with their opponents during the postseason, as they faced off against the same teams that they played against in last year's playoffs, the Hawks, Knicks and Magic, but this time in different order.

=== Aftermath ===
Following the season, Scott was left unprotected in the 1995 NBA expansion draft, where he was selected by the Vancouver Grizzlies expansion team, while long-time Pacers guard Vern Fleming signed as a free agent with the New Jersey Nets, Mitchell re-signed with his former team, the Minnesota Timberwolves, and LaSalle Thompson was released to free agency.

== Offseason ==
=== NBA draft ===
Round	Pick	Player	Position	Nationality	College
1	15	Eric Piatkowski	SG	United States	Nebraska
2	41	William Njoku	PF	Ghana/Canada	St. Mary's (Canada)
2	44	Damon Bailey	PG	United States	Indiana

== Roster ==
1994–95 Indiana Pacers roster
Players

Pos.	No.	Player	Height	Weight	DOB	From
F/C	33	Antonio Davis	6 ft 9 in (2.06 m)	215 lb (98 kg)	1968–10–31	UTEP
F/C	32	Dale Davis	6 ft 11 in (2.11 m)	230 lb (104 kg)	1969–03–25	Clemson
F	27	Duane Ferrell	6 ft 7 in (2.01 m)	209 lb (95 kg)	1965–02–28	Georgia Tech
G	10	Vern Fleming	6 ft 5 in (1.96 m)	185 lb (84 kg)	1962–02–04	Georgia
F	43	Scott Haskin (IN)	6 ft 11 in (2.11 m)	250 lb (113 kg)	1970–09–19	Oregon State
G	13	Mark Jackson	6 ft 1 in (1.85 m)	180 lb (82 kg)	1965–04–01	St. John's
C	54	Greg Kite	6 ft 11 in (2.11 m)	250 lb (113 kg)	1961–08–05	BYU
F	9	Derrick McKey	6 ft 9 in (2.06 m)	205 lb (93 kg)	1966–10–10	Alabama
G	31	Reggie Miller	6 ft 7 in (2.01 m)	185 lb (84 kg)	1965–08–24	UCLA
F	5	Sam Mitchell	6 ft 6 in (1.98 m)	210 lb (95 kg)	1963–09–02	Mercer
G	4	Byron Scott	6 ft 3 in (1.91 m)	195 lb (88 kg)	1961–03–28	Arizona State
C	45	Rik Smits	7 ft 4 in (2.24 m)	250 lb (113 kg)	1966–08–23	Marist
C	41	LaSalle Thompson	6 ft 10 in (2.08 m)	245 lb (111 kg)	1961–06–23	Texas
G	3	Haywoode Workman	6 ft 2 in (1.88 m)	180 lb (82 kg)	1966–01–23	Oral Roberts

Coaches
Head coach
- Larry Brown
Assistant(s)
- Gar Heard
- George Irvine
- Billy King

Legend
- (DP) Unsigned draft pick
- (FA) Free agent
- (S) Suspended
- (IN) Inactive
- Injured

Roster

=== Roster notes ===
- Point guard Damon Bailey was on the injured reserve list due to knee injuries, missed the entire regular season, and never played for the Pacers.
- Center Scott Haskin was on the injured reserve list due to a back injury, and missed the entire regular season.

== Regular season ==
=== Season standings ===
Central Division	W	L	PCT	GB	Home	Road	Div
y-Indiana Pacers	52	30	.634	–	33–8	19–22	18–10
x-Charlotte Hornets	50	32	.610	2	29–12	21–20	17–11
x-Chicago Bulls	47	35	.573	5	28–13	19–22	16–12
x-Cleveland Cavaliers	43	39	.524	9	26–15	17–24	17–11
x-Atlanta Hawks	42	40	.512	10	24–17	18–23	9–19
Milwaukee Bucks	34	48	.415	18	22–19	12–29	13–15
Detroit Pistons	28	54	.341	24	22–19	6–35	8–20

#	Eastern Conference				
#	Team	W	L	PCT	GB
1	c-Orlando Magic	57	25	.695	–
2	y-Indiana Pacers	52	30	.634	5
3	x-New York Knicks	55	27	.671	2
4	x-Charlotte Hornets	50	32	.610	7
5	x-Chicago Bulls	47	35	.573	10
6	x-Cleveland Cavaliers	43	39	.524	14
7	x-Atlanta Hawks	42	40	.512	15
8	x-Boston Celtics	35	47	.427	22
9	Milwaukee Bucks	34	48	.415	23
10	Miami Heat	32	50	.390	25
11	New Jersey Nets	30	52	.366	27
12	Detroit Pistons	28	54	.341	29
13	Philadelphia 76ers	24	58	.293	33
14	Washington Bullets	21	61	.256	36

== Game log ==
=== Regular season ===
1994–95 game log
Total: 52–30 (home: 33–8; road: 19–22)
November: 7–5 (home: 4–1; road: 3–4)

Game	Date	Team	Score	High points	High rebounds	High assists	Location Attendance	Record
1	November 4, 1994	@ Atlanta	W 94–92				The Omni	1–0
2	November 5, 1994	Boston	W 112–103				Market Square Arena	2–0
3	November 9, 1994; 6:00 p.m. EST	Houston	L 104–109	Miller (25)	D. Davis (14)	Jackson (9)	Market Square Arena; 15,258	2–1
4	November 10, 1994	@ Detroit	L 110–112				The Palace of Auburn Hills	2–2
5	November 12, 1994	@ Cleveland	W 93–86				Gund Arena	3–2
6	November 15, 1994	@ Milwaukee	L 81–82				Bradley Center	3–3
7	November 18, 1994	Seattle	W 94–87				Market Square Arena	4–3
8	November 19, 1994	@ Charlotte	W 102–89				Charlotte Coliseum	5–3
9	November 24, 1994	Golden State	W 123–96				Market Square Arena	6–3
10	November 25, 1994	Milwaukee	W 111–106				Market Square Arena	7–3
11	November 27, 1994	@ Portland	L 89–99				Memorial Coliseum	7–4
12	November 28, 1994	@ Seattle	L 99–118				Tacoma Dome	7–5

December: 10–4 (home: 6–0; road: 4–4)

Game	Date	Team	Score	High points	High rebounds	High assists	Location Attendance	Record
13	December 1, 1994	@ L.A. Clippers	W 93–84				Los Angeles Memorial Sports Arena	8–5
14	December 3, 1994	@ Golden State	W 118–107				Oakland-Alameda County Coliseum Arena	9–5
15	December 6, 1994	Detroit	W 90–83				Market Square Arena	10–5
16	December 9, 1994	@ Philadelphia	W 94–88				CoreStates Spectrum	11–5
17	December 10, 1994	Miami	W 117–103				Market Square Arena	12–5
18	December 13, 1994	@ Cleveland	L 83–90				Gund Arena	12–6
19	December 14, 1994	Atlanta	W 81–79				Market Square Arena	13–6
20	December 16, 1994	Charlotte	W 93–91				Market Square Arena	14–6
21	December 20, 1994	@ Charlotte	L 95–99				Charlotte Coliseum	14–7
22	December 21, 1994	Chicago	W 107–99				Market Square Arena	15–7
23	December 23, 1994	@ Chicago	L 92–116				United Center	15–8
24	December 27, 1994	@ Denver	W 95–91				McNichols Sports Arena	16–8
25	December 28, 1994	@ Utah	L 95–117				Delta Center	16–9
26	December 30, 1994	New Jersey	W 96–79				Market Square Arena	17–9

January: 7–8 (home: 5–3; road: 2–5)

Game	Date	Team	Score	High points	High rebounds	High assists	Location Attendance	Record
27	January 3, 1995	@ New Jersey	L 103–114				Brendan Byrne Arena	17–10
28	January 4, 1995	Washington	W 94–90				Market Square Arena	18–10
29	January 6, 1995	@ Dallas	L 92–103				Reunion Arena	18–11
30	January 7, 1995; 8:30 p.m. EST	@ Houston	W 88–83	Miller (23)	D. Davis (12)	Jackson (8)	The Summit; 16,611	19–11
31	January 10, 1995	@ New York	L 105–117				Madison Square Garden	19–12
32	January 11, 1995	@ Boston	L 97–100				Boston Garden	19–13
33	January 13, 1995	@ Washington	W 113–99				Capital Centre	20–13
34	January 14, 1995	Milwaukee	L 95–97				Market Square Arena	20–14
35	January 16, 1995	Utah	L 98–99 (OT)				Market Square Arena	20–15
36	January 18, 1995	L.A. Lakers	W 106–105				Market Square Arena	21–15
37	January 20, 1995	Atlanta	W 99–89				Market Square Arena	22–15
38	January 22, 1995; 2:30 p.m. EST	San Antonio	W 98–93	Smits (16)	D. Davis (11)	Jackson (7)	Market Square Arena; 16,672	23–15
39	January 24, 1995	@ Miami	L 96–107				Miami Arena	23–16
40	January 26, 1995	Phoenix	L 86–92				Market Square Arena	23–17
41	January 28, 1995	Philadelphia	W 106–103 (OT)				Market Square Arena	24–17

February: 10–3 (home: 5–1; road: 5–2)

Game	Date	Team	Score	High points	High rebounds	High assists	Location Attendance	Record
42	February 1, 1995	Cleveland	W 101–82				Market Square Arena	25–17
43	February 3, 1995; 7:30 p.m. EST	Orlando	W 118–106	Smits (27)	Smits (10)	Miller (5)	Market Square Arena; 16,749	26–17
44	February 4, 1995	@ Cleveland	L 73–82				Gund Arena	26–18
45	February 7, 1995	@ Charlotte	W 95–92 (OT)				Charlotte Coliseum	27–18
46	February 8, 1995	New York	L 77–96				Market Square Arena	27–19
All-Star Break
47	February 14, 1995; 7:30 p.m. EST	@ Orlando	L 92–111	Smits (20)	Smits (8)	Jackson (6)	Orlando Arena; 16,010	27–20
48	February 15, 1995	Detroit	W 114–88				Market Square Arena	28–20
49	February 17, 1995	@ Minnesota	W 110–78				Target Center	29–20
50	February 19, 1995	Miami	W 106–87				Market Square Arena	30–20
51	February 22, 1995	@ New Jersey	W 113–94				Brendan Byrne Arena	31–20
52	February 24, 1995	@ Milwaukee	W 98–86				Bradley Center	32–20
53	February 26, 1995	Dallas	W 100–92				Market Square Arena	33–20
54	February 27, 1995	@ Boston	W 108–97				Boston Garden	34–20

March: 11–6 (home: 7–2; road: 4–4)

Game	Date	Team	Score	High points	High rebounds	High assists	Location Attendance	Record
55	March 1, 1995	@ Detroit	L 79–92				The Palace of Auburn Hills	34–21
56	March 3, 1995	@ Washington	L 106–111				Capital Centre	34–22
57	March 4, 1995	Boston	L 101–107				Market Square Arena	34–23
58	March 7, 1995; 8:30 p.m. EST	@ San Antonio	W 117–100	Smits (35)	Smits (10)	Jackson (6)	Alamodome; 17,665	35–23
59	March 9, 1995	@ Sacramento	W 109–94				ARCO Arena	36–23
60	March 10, 1995	@ Phoenix	W 112–97				America West Arena	37–23
61	March 13, 1995	@ L.A. Lakers	L 91–93				Great Western Forum	37–24
62	March 15, 1995	Milwaukee	W 117–108				Market Square Arena	38–24
63	March 17, 1995; 7:30 p.m. EST	Orlando	W 107–97	Smits (21)	Smits (11)	Jackson (11)	Market Square Arena; 16,706	39–24
64	March 19, 1995	Chicago	W 103–96 (OT)				Market Square Arena	40–24
65	March 21, 1995	@ Miami	L 95–97				Miami Arena	40–25
66	March 22, 1995	L.A. Clippers	W 107–103				Market Square Arena	41–25
67	March 24, 1995	Sacramento	W 103–96				Market Square Arena	42–25
68	March 25, 1995	@ Philadelphia	W 84–75				CoreStates Spectrum	43–25
69	March 27, 1995	New Jersey	W 98–87				Market Square Arena	44–25
70	March 29, 1995	Cleveland	W 107–96				Market Square Arena	45–25
71	March 31, 1995	Denver	L 92–107				Market Square Arena	45–26

April: 7–4 (home: 6–1; road: 1–3)

Game	Date	Team	Score	High points	High rebounds	High assists	Location Attendance	Record
72	April 2, 1995	Portland	W 104–93				Market Square Arena	46–26
73	April 4, 1995	@ New York	W 94–90				Madison Square Garden	47–26
74	April 5, 1995	Washington	W 102–90				Market Square Arena	48–26
75	April 7, 1995	@ Atlanta	L 90–102				The Omni	48–27
76	April 9, 1995	Charlotte	W 97–68				Market Square Arena	49–27
77	April 11, 1995	@ Chicago	L 89–96				United Center	49–28
78	April 14, 1995	New York	L 84–88				Market Square Arena	49–29
79	April 16, 1995	Minnesota	W 114–75				Market Square Arena	50–29
80	April 19, 1995	Philadelphia	W 103–91				Market Square Arena	51–29
81	April 21, 1995; 7:00 p.m. EST	@ Orlando	L 86–110	Miller (14)	D. Davis, Mitchell (9)	Jackson (8)	Orlando Arena; 16,010	51–30
82	April 23, 1995	Atlanta	W 103–87				Market Square Arena	52–30

1994–95 schedule

== Playoffs ==
1995 playoff game log
Eastern Conference First Round: 3–0 (home: 2–0; road: 1–0)

Game	Date	Team	Score	High points	High rebounds	High assists	Location Attendance	Series
1	April 27, 1995	Atlanta	W 90–82	Miller (24)	McKey (9)	Jackson (9)	Market Square Arena; 16,445	1–0
2	April 29, 1995	Atlanta	W 105–97	Miller (39)	Smits (11)	Jackson (7)	Market Square Arena; 16,692	2–0
3	May 2, 1995	@ Atlanta	W 105–89	Miller (32)	Smits (14)	Jackson (7)	The Omni; 12,106	3–0

Eastern Conference semifinals: 4–3 (home: 2–1; road: 2–2)

Game	Date	Team	Score	High points	High rebounds	High assists	Location Attendance	Series
1	May 7, 1995	@ New York	W 107–105	Smits (34)	D. Davis (13)	Jackson (7)	Madison Square Garden; 19,763	1–0
2	May 9, 1995	@ New York	L 77–96	D. Davis (13)	D. Davis (9)	Jackson, Workman (4)	Madison Square Garden; 19,763	1–1
3	May 11, 1995	New York	W 97–95 (OT)	Miller (26)	Miller (11)	Jackson (4)	Market Square Arena; 16,675	2–1
4	May 13, 1995	New York	W 98–84	Smits (25)	Smits (11)	Jackson (11)	Market Square Arena; 16,678	3–1
5	May 17, 1995	@ New York	L 95–96	Smits (28)	A. Davis (9)	Miller (6)	Madison Square Garden; 19,763	3–2
6	May 19, 1995	New York	L 82–92	Smits (21)	A. Davis (8)	McKey (6)	Market Square Arena; 16,679	3–3
7	May 21, 1995	@ New York	W 97–95	Miller (29)	Jackson (8)	Jackson (8)	Madison Square Garden; 19,763	4–3

Eastern Conference finals: 3–4 (home: 3–0; road: 0–4)

Game	Date	Team	Score	High points	High rebounds	High assists	Location Attendance	Series
1	May 23, 1995; 7:00 p.m. EST	@ Orlando	L 101–105	Miller (26)	D. Davis (8)	Jackson (7)	Orlando Arena; 16,010	0–1
2	May 25, 1995; 7:00 p.m. EST	@ Orlando	L 114–119	Miller (37)	D. Davis (13)	Smits (6)	Orlando Arena; 16,010	0–2
3	May 27, 1995; 2:30 p.m. EST	Orlando	W 105–100	Miller (26)	A. Davis (10)	Jackson (13)	Market Square Arena; 16,477	1–2
4	May 29, 1995; 2:30 p.m. EST	Orlando	W 94–93	Miller (23)	Jackson, Smits (7)	Smits (7)	Market Square Arena; 16,477	2–2
5	May 31, 1995; 8:00 p.m. EST	@ Orlando	L 106–108	Miller, McKey (21)	McKey (9)	Jackson (11)	Orlando Arena; 16,010	2–3
6	June 2, 1995; 8:00 p.m. EST	Orlando	W 123–96	Reggie Miller (36)	Smits, D. Davis (10)	Mark Jackson (12)	Market Square Arena; 16,477	3–3
7	June 4, 1995; 6:00 p.m. EST	@ Orlando	L 81–105	D. Davis (15)	D. Davis (14)	Jackson (5)	Orlando Arena; 16,010	3–4

1995 schedule

== Player statistics ==
=== Regular season ===
Player	POS	GP	GS	MP	REB	AST	STL	BLK	PTS	MPG	RPG	APG	SPG	BPG	PPG
Mark Jackson	PG	82	67	2,402	306	616	105	16	624	29.3	3.7	7.5	1.3	.2	7.6
Derrick McKey	SF	81	81	2,805	394	276	125	49	1,075	34.6	4.9	3.4	1.5	.6	13.3
Reggie Miller	SG	81	81	2,665	210	242	98	16	1,588	32.9	2.6	3.0	1.2	.2	19.6
Sam Mitchell	SF	81	12	1,377	243	61	43	20	529	17.0	3.0	.8	.5	.2	6.5
Byron Scott	PG	80	1	1,528	151	108	61	13	802	19.1	1.9	1.4	.8	.2	10.0
Rik Smits	C	78	78	2,381	601	111	40	79	1,400	30.5	7.7	1.4	.5	1.0	17.9
Dale Davis	PF	74	70	2,346	696	58	72	116	786	31.7	9.4	.8	1.0	1.6	10.6
Haywoode Workman	PG	69	14	1,028	111	194	59	5	292	14.9	1.6	2.8	.9	.1	4.2
Duane Ferrell	SF	56	1	607	88	31	26	6	231	10.8	1.6	.6	.5	.1	4.1
Vern Fleming	PG	55	1	686	88	109	27	1	251	12.5	1.6	2.0	.5	.0	4.6
Antonio Davis	PF	44	1	1,030	280	25	19	29	335	23.4	6.4	.6	.4	.7	7.6
LaSalle Thompson	C	38	3	453	89	18	18	10	112	11.9	2.3	.5	.5	.3	2.9
John Williams	SF	34	0	402	62	27	10	2	100	11.8	1.8	.8	.3	.1	2.9
Greg Kite^{†}	C	9	0	61	18	1	0	0	8	6.8	2.0	.1	.0	.0	.9
Mark Strickland	PF	4	0	9	4	0	0	1	3	2.3	1.0	.0	.0	.3	.8

- ^{†} Denotes player spent time with another team in the season. Stats reflect time with the Pacers only.

=== Playoffs ===
Player	POS	GP	GS	MP	REB	AST	STL	BLK	PTS	MPG	RPG	APG	SPG	BPG	PPG
Reggie Miller	SG	17	17	641	61	36	15	4	434	37.7	3.6	2.1	.9	.2	25.5
Derrick McKey	SF	17	17	592	81	64	17	11	217	34.8	4.8	3.8	1.0	.6	12.8
Mark Jackson	PG	17	17	554	89	122	15	0	168	32.6	5.2	7.2	.9	.0	9.9
Rik Smits	C	17	17	546	119	34	5	14	341	32.1	7.0	2.0	.3	.8	20.1
Dale Davis	PF	17	17	490	136	6	7	14	135	28.8	8.0	.4	.4	.8	7.9
Antonio Davis	PF	17	0	367	97	7	9	11	101	21.6	5.7	.4	.5	.6	5.9
Byron Scott	PG	17	0	298	25	16	10	1	103	17.5	1.5	.9	.6	.1	6.1
Haywoode Workman	PG	17	0	275	28	45	11	0	77	16.2	1.6	2.6	.6	.0	4.5
Sam Mitchell	SF	17	0	223	48	6	3	1	68	13.1	2.8	.4	.2	.1	4.0
Duane Ferrell	SF	10	0	85	11	13	0	2	27	8.5	1.1	1.3	.0	.2	2.7
Greg Kite	C	8	0	26	7	0	1	0	4	3.3	.9	.0	.1	.0	.5
Vern Fleming	PG	3	0	8	2	2	0	0	2	2.7	.7	.7	.0	.0	.7

== Awards, records, and honors ==
- Reggie Miller, NBA All-Star Game
- Reggie Miller, All-NBA Third Team
- Derrick McKey, NBA All-Defensive Second Team

== Transactions ==
The Pacers were involved in the following transactions during the 1994–95 season.

=== Trades ===
June 30, 1994	To Indiana Pacers Mark Jackson; Greg Minor	To Los Angeles Clippers Pooh Richardson; Malik Sealy; Eric Piatkowski

=== Free agents ===
==== Additions ====
Player	Signed	Former team
Duane Ferrell	September 30	Atlanta Hawks
Dan O'Sullivan	October 6	Detroit Pistons
John Williams	October 7	Los Angeles Clippers
Mark Strickland	March 4	Fort Wayne Fury (CBA)
Greg Kite	March 24	New York Knicks

==== Subtractions ====
Player	Left	New team
Dan O'Sullivan	waived, October 11	Rapid City Thrillers (CBA)
Greg Minor	released, October 14	Boston Celtics
John Williams	waived, March 4	CB Granada (LEB Oro)
Mark Strickland	renounced, March 24	Atléticos de San Germán (BSN)

Player Transactions Citation:
