= 1994–95 Atlanta Hawks season =

Season of National Basketball Association team the Atlanta Hawks

- Head coach: Lenny Wilkens
- General manager: Pete Babcock
- Owners: Ted Turner / Turner Broadcasting System
- Arena: The Omni

Results
- Record: 42–40 (.512)
- Place: Division: 5th (Central); Conference: 7th (Eastern)
- Playoff finish: First round (lost to Pacers 0–3)
- Stats at Basketball Reference

Local media
- Television: WATL; SportSouth
- Radio: WCNN

The 1994–95 Atlanta Hawks season was the 46th season for the Atlanta Hawks in the National Basketball Association, and their 27th season in Atlanta, Georgia. This was the team's first season since 1981–82 without All-Star forward Dominique Wilkins, as he signed as a free agent with the Boston Celtics in the off-season.

== Season summary ==
=== Off-season ===
During the off-season, the Hawks acquired Ken Norman from the Milwaukee Bucks, and Tyrone Corbin from the Utah Jazz. For the season, the Hawks revealed new black alternate road uniforms, which featured a red, yellow and white trim, and white side panels with yellow and red outlines on the left side of their jerseys and shorts; these uniforms only lasted for just one season.

=== Regular season ===
After the first two games of the regular season, the Hawks traded Kevin Willis to the Miami Heat in exchange for Steve Smith and Grant Long. Despite the addition of Smith and Long, the Hawks struggled losing their first four games of the regular season, lost 9 of their 13 games in November, got off to a 12–19 start to the season, and later on held a 22–26 record at the All-Star break. However, the team played above .500 in winning percentage for the remainder of the season, and won seven of their final ten games. The Hawks finished in fifth place in the Central Division with a mediocre 42–40 record, and earned the seventh seed in the Eastern Conference.

Mookie Blaylock averaged 17.2 points, 7.7 assists and 2.5 steals per game, led the Hawks with 199 three-point field goals, and was named to the NBA All-Defensive First Team, while Smith averaged 16.2 points per game and contributed 135 three-point field goals, and Stacey Augmon provided the team with 13.9 points and 1.3 steals per game. In addition, Norman contributed 12.7 points and 4.9 rebounds per game, while Long provided with 11.7 points, 7.5 rebounds and 1.4 steals per game, and Andrew Lang averaged 9.7 points, 5.6 rebounds and 1.8 blocks per game. Off the bench, sixth man Craig Ehlo contributed 9.7 points per game, but only played just 49 games due to a knee injury, while Corbin provided with 6.2 points per game, and Jon Koncak averaged 2.9 points and 3.0 rebounds per game.

The Hawks finished 26th in the NBA in home-game attendance, with an attendance of 504,807 at the Omni Coliseum during the regular season, which was the second-lowest in the league.

=== NBA playoffs ===
In the Eastern Conference First Round of the 1995 NBA playoffs, and for the second consecutive year, the Hawks faced off against the 2nd–seeded, and Central Division champion Indiana Pacers, who were led by All-Star guard Reggie Miller, Rik Smits and Mark Jackson. The Hawks lost the first two games to the Pacers on the road at the Market Square Arena, before losing Game 3 at home, 105–89 at the Omni Coliseum, thus losing the series in a three-game sweep.

=== Notable highlights ===
One notable highlight of the regular season occurred on January 6, 1995, when head coach Lenny Wilkens became the NBA's all-time winningest coach, surpassing former Boston Celtics coach Red Auerbach with 939 wins, as the Hawks defeated the Washington Bullets at the Omni Coliseum, 112–90. Shortly before the game had ended, Hawks assistant coach Dick Helm gave Wilkens a cigar and a lighter; Wilkens, who does not smoke, lit up the cigar, took a puff, and told the crowd at "The Omni" that it was a testament to Auerbach, who was known for his trademark "victory cigar".

=== Aftermath ===
Following the season, Corbin was traded to the Sacramento Kings, and Koncak signed as a free agent with the Orlando Magic after ten seasons with the Hawks.

== Draft picks ==
Round	Pick	Player	Position	Nationality	College
2	34	Gaylon Nickerson (from L.A. Clippers)	Guard	United States	NW Oklahoma State

== Roster ==
1994–95 Atlanta Hawks roster
Players

Pos.	No.	Player	Height	Weight	DOB	From
C	0	Greg Anderson	6 ft 10 in (2.08 m)	230 lb (104 kg)	1964–06–22	Houston
F	2	Stacey Augmon	6 ft 8 in (2.03 m)	205 lb (93 kg)	1968–08–01	UNLV
G	10	Mookie Blaylock	6 ft 0 in (1.83 m)	180 lb (82 kg)	1967–03–20	Oklahoma
G/F	33	Tyrone Corbin	6 ft 6 in (1.98 m)	210 lb (95 kg)	1962–12–31	DePaul
F	34	Doug Edwards	6 ft 7 in (2.01 m)	220 lb (100 kg)	1971–01–21	Florida State
G	3	Craig Ehlo	6 ft 6 in (1.98 m)	180 lb (82 kg)	1961–08–11	Washington State
C	32	Jon Koncak	7 ft 0 in (2.13 m)	250 lb (113 kg)	1963–05–17	SMU
C	28	Andrew Lang	6 ft 11 in (2.11 m)	245 lb (111 kg)	1966–06–28	Arkansas
G	14	Jim Les (injured)	5 ft 11 in (1.80 m)	165 lb (75 kg)	1963–08–18	Bradley
F	43	Grant Long	6 ft 8 in (2.03 m)	225 lb (102 kg)	1966–03–12	Eastern Michigan
F	5	Ken Norman	6 ft 8 in (2.03 m)	215 lb (98 kg)	1964–09–05	Illinois
G	8	Steve Smith	6 ft 7 in (2.01 m)	200 lb (91 kg)	1969–03–31	Michigan State
G	1	Ennis Whatley	6 ft 3 in (1.91 m)	177 lb (80 kg)	1962–08–11	Alabama

Coaches
Head coach
- Lenny Wilkens
Assistant(s)
- Dick Helm
- Brian Winters

Legend
- (DP) Unsigned draft pick
- (FA) Free agent
- (S) Suspended
- (IN) Inactive
- Injured

Roster

=== Roster Notes ===
- Center Blair Rasmussen was on the injured reserve list due to a back injury, and missed the entire regular season.

== Regular season ==
=== Season standings ===
Central Division	W	L	PCT	GB	Home	Road	Div
y-Indiana Pacers	52	30	.634	–	33–8	19–22	18–10
x-Charlotte Hornets	50	32	.610	2	29–12	21–20	17–11
x-Chicago Bulls	47	35	.573	5	28–13	19–22	16–12
x-Cleveland Cavaliers	43	39	.524	9	26–15	17–24	17–11
x-Atlanta Hawks	42	40	.512	10	24–17	18–23	9–19
Milwaukee Bucks	34	48	.415	18	22–19	12–29	13–15
Detroit Pistons	28	54	.341	24	22–19	6–35	8–20

#	Eastern Conference				
#	Team	W	L	PCT	GB
1	c-Orlando Magic	57	25	.695	–
2	y-Indiana Pacers	52	30	.634	5
3	x-New York Knicks	55	27	.671	2
4	x-Charlotte Hornets	50	32	.610	7
5	x-Chicago Bulls	47	35	.573	10
6	x-Cleveland Cavaliers	43	39	.524	14
7	x-Atlanta Hawks	42	40	.512	15
8	x-Boston Celtics	35	47	.427	22
9	Milwaukee Bucks	34	48	.415	23
10	Miami Heat	32	50	.390	25
11	New Jersey Nets	30	52	.366	27
12	Detroit Pistons	28	54	.341	29
13	Philadelphia 76ers	24	58	.293	33
14	Washington Bullets	21	61	.256	36

=== Game log ===
1994–95 game log
Total: 42–40 (home: 24–17; road: 18–23)
November: 4–9 (home: 2–5; road: 2–4)

Game	Date	Team	Score	High points	High rebounds	High assists	Location Attendance	Record

December: 8–8 (home: 5–2; road: 3–6)

Game	Date	Team	Score	High points	High rebounds	High assists	Location Attendance	Record
27	December 27, 1994; 8:30 p.m. EST	@ Houston	L 93–105	Norman (28)	Norman (11)	Ehlo (6)	The Summit; 16,394	11–16

January: 7–7 (home: 4–5; road: 3–2)

Game	Date	Team	Score	High points	High rebounds	High assists	Location Attendance	Record

February: 8–4 (home: 4–2; road: 4–2)

Game	Date	Team	Score	High points	High rebounds	High assists	Location Attendance	Record
All-Star Break

March: 8–8 (home: 5–3; road: 3–5)

Game	Date	Team	Score	High points	High rebounds	High assists	Location Attendance	Record
62	March 13, 1995; 7:30 p.m. EST	Houston	L 86–97	Blaylock (25)	Norman (11)	Smith (7)	The Omni; 11,746	31–31

April: 7–4 (home: 4–0; road: 3–4)

Game	Date	Team	Score	High points	High rebounds	High assists	Location Attendance	Record

1994–95 schedule

== Playoffs ==
1995 playoff game log
First Round: 0–3 (home: 0–1; road: 0–2)

Game	Date	Team	Score	High points	High rebounds	High assists	Location Attendance	Series
1	April 27	@ Indiana	L 82–90	Grant Long (18)	Grant Long (11)	Mookie Blaylock (9)	Market Square Arena; 16,445	0–1
2	April 29	@ Indiana	L 97–105	Steve Smith (27)	Grant Long (13)	Smith, Blaylock (3)	Market Square Arena; 16,692	0–2
3	May 2	Indiana	L 89–105	Mookie Blaylock (20)	Grant Long (10)	Mookie Blaylock (5)	The Omni; 12,106	0–3

1995 schedule

== Player statistics ==
Legend
GP	Games played	GS	Games started	MPG	Minutes per game
FG%	Field-goal percentage	3P%	3-point field-goal percentage	FT%	Free-throw percentage
RPG	Rebounds per game	APG	Assists per game	SPG	Steals per game
BPG	Blocks per game	PPG	Points per game

=== Season ===
Player	GP	GS	MPG	FG%	3P%	FT%	RPG	APG	SPG	BPG	PPG
Greg Anderson	51	0	12.2	.548	N/A	.479	3.7	0.3	0.5	0.6	2.9
Stacey Augmon	76	76	31.1	.453	.269	.728	4.8	2.6	1.3	0.6	13.9
Sergei Bazarevich	10	0	7.4	.500	.167	.778	0.7	1.4	0.1	0.1	3.0
Mookie Blaylock	80	80	38.4	.425	.359	.729	4.9	7.7	2.5	0.3	17.2
Tyrone Corbin	81	4	17.1	.442	.250	.684	3.2	0.8	0.7	0.2	6.2
Doug Edwards	38	0	5.6	.458	.000	.719	1.3	0.3	0.1	0.1	1.8
Craig Ehlo	49	0	23.8	.453	.381	.620	3.0	2.3	0.9	0.1	9.7
Tom Hovasse	2	0	2.0	.000	.000	N/A	0.0	0.0	0.5	0.0	0.0
Jon Koncak	62	20	15.2	.412	.333	.542	3.0	0.8	0.6	0.7	2.9
Andrew Lang	82	63	28.5	.473	.667	.809	5.6	0.9	0.5	1.8	9.7
Jim Les	24	0	7.8	.289	.217	.852	1.1	1.8	0.2	0.0	2.1
Grant Long	79	77	32.6	.479	.355	.756	7.5	1.6	1.4	0.4	11.7
Ken Norman	74	27	25.4	.453	.344	.457	4.9	1.3	0.5	0.3	12.7
Steve Smith	78	59	33.4	.427	.334	.845	3.5	3.4	0.8	0.4	16.2
Fred Vinson	5	0	5.4	.143	.167	1.000	0.0	0.2	0.0	0.0	0.8
Ennis Whatley	27	2	10.8	.453	.250	.625	1.1	2.0	0.7	0.0	2.8
Morlon Wiley	5	0	3.4	.500	.250	N/A	0.8	1.2	0.2	0.2	1.4
Kevin Willis	2	2	44.5	.390	.000	.667	18.0	1.5	0.5	1.5	21.0

=== Playoffs ===
Player	GP	GS	MPG	FG%	3P%	FT%	RPG	APG	SPG	BPG	PPG
Greg Anderson	3	0	13.0	.200	.000	.750	4.3	0.7	0.7	0.7	1.7
Stacey Augmon	3	1	17.3	.429	.000	.750	2.3	1.7	1.0	0.0	7.0
Mookie Blaylock	3	3	40.3	.367	.393	.636	4.3	5.7	1.3	0.0	18.0
Tyrone Corbin	3	2	26.3	.462	.333	.889	3.3	0.7	0.7	0.3	11.3
Craig Ehlo	3	0	16.3	.167	.167	1.000	2.3	1.0	0.7	0.0	3.0
Andrew Lang	3	3	33.7	.429	.000	.778	4.0	0.3	0.7	0.7	10.3
Grant Long	3	3	36.7	.500	.000	.722	11.3	1.3	1.3	0.3	13.7
Ken Norman	3	0	14.0	.389	.125	.143	3.0	1.0	0.0	0.3	5.3
Steve Smith	3	3	36.0	.395	.389	.842	2.7	2.0	2.0	0.3	19.0
Ennis Whatley	3	0	6.3	.000	.000	.000	1.3	0.3	0.0	0.0	0.0

Player statistics citation:

== Awards and records ==
=== Awards ===
- Mookie Blaylock, NBA All-Defensive First Team

== Trades ==
November 7, 1994

- Traded Kevin Willis, and a 1996 first-round draft pick to the Miami Heat for Grant Long, Steve Smith, and a 1996 second-round draft pick.

Player Transactions Citation:

== See also ==
- 1994–95 NBA season
