= 1994–95 Charlotte Hornets season =

NBA professional basketball team season

- Head coach: Allan Bristow
- General manager: Dave Twardzik
- Owner: George Shinn
- Arena: Charlotte Coliseum

Results
- Record: 50–32 (.610)
- Place: Division: 2nd (Central); Conference: 4th (Eastern)
- Playoff finish: First round (lost to Bulls 1–3)
- Stats at Basketball Reference

Local media
- Television: WJZY; SportSouth
- Radio: WBT

The 1994–95 Charlotte Hornets season was the seventh season for the Charlotte Hornets in the National Basketball Association.

== Season summary ==
=== Off-season ===
During the off-season, the Hornets signed free agent All-Star center Robert Parish, who won three NBA championships with the Boston Celtics in the 1980s, and acquired Michael Adams from the Washington Bullets.

For the season, the Hornets revealed new purple pinstriped alternate road uniforms, which featured a purple, white, green and teal trim, and white side panels on the bottom of their shorts; these uniforms would remain in use until 1997.

=== Regular season ===
After falling one game short of the NBA playoffs the previous season, the Hornets lost their first three games of the regular season, but later on posted an eight-game winning streak between December and January. The team posted a six-game winning streak between January and February, and held a 31–17 record at the All-Star break. The Hornets finished in second place in the Central Division with a solid 50–32 record, earning the fourth seed in the Eastern Conference, and qualifying for their second NBA playoff appearance.

Alonzo Mourning averaged 21.3 points, 9.9 rebounds and 2.9 blocks per game, while Larry Johnson averaged 18.8 points, 7.2 rebounds and 4.6 assists per game, and Hersey Hawkins provided the team with 14.3 points and 1.5 steals per game, along with 131 three-point field goals. In addition, sixth man Dell Curry contributed 13.6 points per game, and led the Hornets with 154 three-point field goals off the bench, while second-year forward Scott Burrell provided with 11.5 points and 5.7 rebounds per game, and Muggsy Bogues contributed 11.1 points, 8.7 assists and 1.3 steals per game. Meanwhile, Adams averaged 6.5 points and 3.3 assists per game, but only played just 29 games due to injury, Kenny Gattison provided with 6.0 points and 3.6 rebounds per game, but only appeared in just 21 games, and Parish averaged 4.8 points and 4.3 rebounds per game.

During the NBA All-Star weekend at the America West Arena in Phoenix, Arizona, Mourning and Johnson were both selected for the 1995 NBA All-Star Game, as members of the Eastern Conference All-Star team; it was Johnson's second and final All-Star appearance. Meanwhile, Burrell participated in the NBA Three-Point Shootout. Mourning also finished tied in sixth place in Defensive Player of the Year voting, while Curry finished in second place in Sixth Man of the Year voting, behind Anthony Mason of the New York Knicks, and Burrell finished tied in third place in Most Improved Player voting.

The Hornets led the NBA in home-game attendance for the sixth time in seven seasons, with an attendance of 971,618 at the Charlotte Coliseum during the regular season.

=== NBA playoffs ===
In the Eastern Conference First Round of the 1995 NBA playoffs, the Hornets faced off against the 5th–seeded Chicago Bulls, who were led by All-Star guard Michael Jordan, All-Star forward Scottie Pippen, and second-year star Toni Kukoč; Jordan recently came out of his retirement and returned to play for the Bulls after an unsuccessful baseball career. The Hornets lost Game 1 to the Bulls at home in overtime, 108–100 at the Charlotte Coliseum, but then won Game 2 at home, 106–89 to even the series. However, the Hornets lost the next two games on the road, which included a Game 4 loss to the Bulls at the United Center, 85–84, thus losing the series in four games.

=== Aftermath ===
Despite the stellar season, Johnson and Mourning had trouble getting along as teammates. Following the season, Mourning was traded to the Miami Heat after three seasons with the franchise, while Hawkins and David Wingate were both traded to the Seattle SuperSonics, and Gattison was left unprotected in the 1995 NBA expansion draft, where he was selected by the Vancouver Grizzlies expansion team.

== NBA draft ==
Round	Pick	Player	Position	Nationality	College
2	38	Darrin Hancock	SF	United States	Kansas

== Roster ==
1994–95 Charlotte Hornets roster
Players

Pos.	No.	Player	Height	Weight	DOB	From
G	23	Michael Adams	5 ft 10 in (1.78 m)	162 lb (73 kg)	1963–01–19	Boston College
G	25	Tony Bennett	6 ft 0 in (1.83 m)	175 lb (79 kg)	1969–06–01	Green Bay
G	1	Muggsy Bogues	5 ft 3 in (1.60 m)	136 lb (62 kg)	1965–01–09	Wake Forest
F	24	Scott Burrell	6 ft 7 in (2.01 m)	218 lb (99 kg)	1971–01–12	Connecticut
G	30	Dell Curry	6 ft 4 in (1.93 m)	190 lb (86 kg)	1964–06–25	Virginia Tech
F	44	Kenny Gattison	6 ft 8 in (2.03 m)	225 lb (102 kg)	1964–05–23	Old Dominion
F	4	Darrin Hancock	6 ft 7 in (2.01 m)	205 lb (93 kg)	1971–11–03	Kansas
G	3	Hersey Hawkins	6 ft 3 in (1.91 m)	190 lb (86 kg)	1966–09–29	Bradley
F	2	Larry Johnson	6 ft 6 in (1.98 m)	250 lb (113 kg)	1969–03–14	UNLV
C	33	Alonzo Mourning	6 ft 10 in (2.08 m)	240 lb (109 kg)	1970–02–08	Georgetown
C	00	Robert Parish	7 ft 0 in (2.13 m)	230 lb (104 kg)	1953–08–30	Centenary
G	12	Greg Sutton	6 ft 2 in (1.88 m)	170 lb (77 kg)	1967–12–03	Oral Roberts
G	55	David Wingate	6 ft 5 in (1.96 m)	185 lb (84 kg)	1963–12–15	Georgetown
F	43	Joe Wolf	6 ft 11 in (2.11 m)	230 lb (104 kg)	1964–12–17	North Carolina

Coaches
Head coach
- Allan Bristow
Assistant(s)
- Johnny Bach
- T. R. Dunn
- Bill Hanzlik

Legend
- (DP) Unsigned draft pick
- (FA) Free agent
- (S) Suspended
- (IN) Inactive
- Injured

Roster

== Regular season ==
=== Standings ===
Central Division	W	L	PCT	GB	Home	Road	Div
y-Indiana Pacers	52	30	.634	–	33–8	19–22	18–10
x-Charlotte Hornets	50	32	.610	2	29–12	21–20	17–11
x-Chicago Bulls	47	35	.573	5	28–13	19–22	16–12
x-Cleveland Cavaliers	43	39	.524	9	26–15	17–24	17–11
x-Atlanta Hawks	42	40	.512	10	24–17	18–23	9–19
Milwaukee Bucks	34	48	.415	18	22–19	12–29	13–15
Detroit Pistons	28	54	.341	24	22–19	6–35	8–20

#	Eastern Conference				
#	Team	W	L	PCT	GB
1	c-Orlando Magic	57	25	.695	–
2	y-Indiana Pacers	52	30	.634	5
3	x-New York Knicks	55	27	.671	2
4	x-Charlotte Hornets	50	32	.610	7
5	x-Chicago Bulls	47	35	.573	10
6	x-Cleveland Cavaliers	43	39	.524	14
7	x-Atlanta Hawks	42	40	.512	15
8	x-Boston Celtics	35	47	.427	22
9	Milwaukee Bucks	34	48	.415	23
10	Miami Heat	32	50	.390	25
11	New Jersey Nets	30	52	.366	27
12	Detroit Pistons	28	54	.341	29
13	Philadelphia 76ers	24	58	.293	33
14	Washington Bullets	21	61	.256	36

== Game log ==
=== Regular season ===
1994–95 game log
Total: 50–32 (home: 29–12; road: 21–20)
November: 7–6 (home: 4–3; road: 3–3)

Game	Date	Team	Score	High points	High rebounds	High assists	Location Attendance	Record

December: 9–6 (home: 5–0; road: 4–6)

Game	Date	Team	Score	High points	High rebounds	High assists	Location Attendance	Record
17	December 8, 1994; 8:30 p.m. EST	@ Houston	L 95–101	Burrell (23)	Mourning (13)	Bogues (9)	The Summit; 12,792	9–8

January: 11–4 (home: 7–2; road: 4–2)

Game	Date	Team	Score	High points	High rebounds	High assists	Location Attendance	Record

February: 8–5 (home: 5–2; road: 3–3)

Game	Date	Team	Score	High points	High rebounds	High assists	Location Attendance	Record
All-Star Break
50	February 16, 1995; 8:00 p.m. EST	Houston	L 89–105	Johnson (18)	Mourning (11)	Bogues (12)	Charlotte Coliseum; 23,698	31–19

March: 7–7 (home: 4–3; road: 3–4)

Game	Date	Team	Score	High points	High rebounds	High assists	Location Attendance	Record

April: 8–4 (home: 4–2; road: 4–2)

Game	Date	Team	Score	High points	High rebounds	High assists	Location Attendance	Record

1994–95 schedule

== Playoffs ==
1995 playoff game log
First Round: 1–3 (home: 1–1; road: 0–2)

Game	Date	Team	Score	High points	High rebounds	High assists	Location Attendance	Series
1	April 28	Chicago	L 100–108 (OT)	Alonzo Mourning (32)	Alonzo Mourning (13)	Muggsy Bogues (10)	Charlotte Coliseum; 23,859	0–1
2	April 30	Chicago	W 106–89	Larry Johnson (25)	Alonzo Mourning (20)	Muggsy Bogues (7)	Charlotte Coliseum; 23,859	1–1
3	May 2	@ Chicago	L 80–103	Larry Johnson (22)	Alonzo Mourning (7)	four players tied (3)	United Center; 24,114	1–2
4	May 4	@ Chicago	L 84–85	Alonzo Mourning (20)	Alonzo Mourning (13)	Bogues, Wingate (5)	United Center; 24,221	1–3

1995 schedule

== Player statistics ==
=== Ragular season ===
Player	POS	GP	GS	MP	REB	AST	STL	BLK	PTS	MPG	RPG	APG	SPG	BPG	PPG
Hersey Hawkins	SG	82	82	2,731	314	262	122	18	1,172	33.3	3.8	3.2	1.5	.2	14.3
Larry Johnson	PF	81	81	3,234	585	369	78	28	1,525	39.9	7.2	4.6	1.0	.3	18.8
Robert Parish	C	81	4	1,352	350	44	27	36	389	16.7	4.3	.5	.3	.4	4.8
Muggsy Bogues	PG	78	78	2,629	257	675	103	0	862	33.7	3.3	8.7	1.3	.0	11.1
Alonzo Mourning	C	77	77	2,941	761	111	49	225	1,643	38.2	9.9	1.4	.6	2.9	21.3
Dell Curry	SG	69	0	1,718	168	113	55	18	935	24.9	2.4	1.6	.8	.3	13.6
Scott Burrell	SF	65	62	2,014	368	161	75	40	750	31.0	5.7	2.5	1.2	.6	11.5
Joe Wolf	PF	63	6	583	129	37	9	6	90	9.3	2.0	.6	.1	.1	1.4
Greg Sutton	PG	53	4	690	56	91	33	2	263	13.0	1.1	1.7	.6	.0	5.0
David Wingate	SG	52	9	515	60	56	19	6	122	9.9	1.2	1.1	.4	.1	2.3
Darrin Hancock	SF	46	7	424	53	30	19	4	153	9.2	1.2	.7	.4	.1	3.3
Michael Adams	PG	29	0	443	29	95	23	1	188	15.3	1.0	3.3	.8	.0	6.5
Kenny Gattison	PF	21	0	409	75	17	7	15	125	19.5	3.6	.8	.3	.7	6.0
Tom Tolbert	PF	10	0	57	17	2	0	0	14	5.7	1.7	.2	.0	.0	1.4
James Blackwell^{†}	PG	4	0	19	3	5	1	0	4	4.8	.8	1.3	.3	.0	1.0
Tony Bennett	PG	3	0	46	2	4	0	0	14	15.3	.7	1.3	.0	.0	4.7

- ^{†} Denotes player spent time with another team in the season. Stats reflect time with the Hornets only.

=== Playoffs ===
Player	POS	GP	GS	MP	REB	AST	STL	BLK	PTS	MPG	RPG	APG	SPG	BPG	PPG
Alonzo Mourning	C	4	4	174	53	11	3	13	88	43.5	13.3	2.8	.8	3.3	22.0
Larry Johnson	PF	4	4	172	23	11	4	2	83	43.0	5.8	2.8	1.0	.5	20.8
Muggsy Bogues	PG	4	4	145	6	25	4	0	34	36.3	1.5	6.3	1.0	.0	8.5
Hersey Hawkins	SG	4	4	130	21	8	6	2	45	32.5	5.3	2.0	1.5	.5	11.3
David Wingate	SG	4	4	73	6	15	4	0	32	18.3	1.5	3.8	1.0	.0	8.0
Dell Curry	SG	4	0	107	9	6	0	0	51	26.8	2.3	1.5	.0	.0	12.8
Robert Parish	C	4	0	71	9	1	0	3	14	17.8	2.3	.3	.0	.8	3.5
Kenny Gattison	PF	4	0	58	12	2	2	0	15	14.5	3.0	.5	.5	.0	3.8
Greg Sutton	PG	3	0	23	5	3	0	0	0	7.7	1.7	1.0	.0	.0	.0
Darrin Hancock	SF	3	0	18	4	1	1	0	4	6.0	1.3	.3	.3	.0	1.3
Michael Adams	PG	1	0	11	1	2	0	0	4	11.0	1.0	2.0	.0	.0	4.0
Joe Wolf	PF	1	0	3	0	0	0	0	0	3.0	.0	.0	.0	.0	.0

== Transactions ==
The Hornets were involved in the following transactions during the 1994–95 season.

=== Trades ===
August 2, 1995	To Charlotte Hornets Michael Adams	To Washington Bullets 1996 second-round pick 1997 second-round pick

=== Free agents ===
==== Additions ====
Player	Signed	Former team
Robert Parish	August 4	Boston Celtics
James Blackwell	October 3	La Crosse Catbirds (CBA)
Tom Tolbert	October 7	Los Angeles Clippers
Joe Courtney	November 2	Milwaukee Bucks
Joe Wolf	November 3	Baloncesto León (LEB Oro)
Greg Sutton	November 16	Apollon Patras B.C. (GBL)
James Blackwell	November 30	Pittsburgh Piranhas (CBA)

==== Subtractions ====
Player	Left	New team
Frank Brickowski	free agency, August 19	Sacramento Kings
James Blackwell	waived, November 1	Pittsburgh Piranhas (CBA)
Joe Courtney	waived, November 16	Mexico Aztecas (CBA)
James Blackwell	waived, December 17	Boston Celtics
Tom Tolbert	waived, April 15	Retired

Player Transactions Citation:
