= 1994–95 Milwaukee Bucks season =

NBA professional basketball team season

- Head coach: Mike Dunleavy
- General manager: Mike Dunleavy
- Owner: Herb Kohl
- Arena: Bradley Center

Results
- Record: 34–48 (.415)
- Place: Division: 6th (Central); Conference: 9th (Eastern)
- Playoff finish: Did not qualify
- Stats at Basketball Reference

Local media
- Television: WVTV; Prime Sports Upper Midwest
- Radio: WTMJ

The 1994–95 Milwaukee Bucks season was the 27th season for the Milwaukee Bucks in the National Basketball Association.

== Season summary ==
=== Off-season ===
After finishing with a 20–62 record the previous season, the Bucks won the NBA draft lottery, and selected small forward Glenn Robinson out of Purdue University with the first overall pick in the 1994 NBA draft. During the off-season, the team signed free agents Marty Conlon, Johnny Newman, and Alton Lister, and acquired Ed Pinckney from the Boston Celtics on draft day.

=== Regular season ===
With the addition of Robinson, Conlon and Newman, the Bucks got off to a 5–3 start to the regular season, but then struggled posting a nine-game losing streak between November and December afterwards, and falling below .500 in winning percentage. The team played .500 basketball with an 8–8 record in January, and later on held a 19–29 record at the All-Star break. Eric Murdock played half of the season off the bench, being replaced with Lee Mayberry as the team's starting point guard. The Bucks won six of their final nine games of the season, and finished in sixth place in the Central Division with a 34–48 record, missing the NBA playoffs by finishing just one game behind the 8th–seeded Boston Celtics.

Robinson had a stellar rookie season averaging 21.9 points, 6.4 rebounds and 1.4 steals per game, and was named to the NBA All-Rookie First Team, while second-year star Vin Baker averaged 17.7 points, 10.3 rebounds, 3.6 assists and 1.4 blocks per game, and Todd Day provided the team with 16.0 points per game, and led them with 163 three-point field goals. In addition, Murdock contributed 13.0 points, 6.4 assists and 1.5 steals per game, while Conlon averaged 9.9 points and 5.2 rebounds per game, Newman contributed 7.7 points per game, and Mayberry provided with 5.8 points and 3.4 assists per game.

During the NBA All-Star weekend at the America West Arena in Phoenix, Arizona, Baker was selected for the 1995 NBA All-Star Game, as a member of the Eastern Conference All-Star team; it was his first ever All-Star appearance. Meanwhile, Robinson was selected for the NBA Rookie Game, as a member of the White team; Robinson scored 21 points along with 3 steals, as the White team defeated the Green team in overtime, 83–79. Robinson also finished in third place in Rookie of the Year voting, behind co-winners Grant Hill of the Detroit Pistons, and Jason Kidd of the Dallas Mavericks.

The Bucks finished 14th in the NBA in home-game attendance, with an attendance of 670,720 at the Bradley Center during the regular season.

=== Aftermath ===
Following the season, Pinckney was left unprotected in the 1995 NBA expansion draft, where he was selected by the Toronto Raptors expansion team, and Jon Barry signed as a free agent with the Golden State Warriors.

== Draft picks ==
Round	Pick	Player	Position	Nationality	College
1	1	Glenn Robinson	SF	United States	Purdue
1	18	Eric Mobley	C	United States	Pittsburgh
2	46	Voshon Lenard	SG	United States	Minnesota

== Roster ==
1994–95 Milwaukee Bucks roster
Players

Pos.	No.	Player	Height	Weight	DOB	From
F/C	42	Vin Baker	6 ft 11 in (2.11 m)	232 lb (105 kg)	1971–11–23	Hartford
G	17	Jon Barry	6 ft 4 in (1.93 m)	195 lb (88 kg)	1969–07–25	Georgia Tech
C	30	Marty Conlon	6 ft 10 in (2.08 m)	224 lb (102 kg)	1968–01–19	Providence
G	10	Todd Day	6 ft 6 in (1.98 m)	188 lb (85 kg)	1970–01–07	Arkansas
G	12	Tate George	6 ft 5 in (1.96 m)	190 lb (86 kg)	1968–05–29	Connecticut
C	53	Alton Lister	7 ft 0 in (2.13 m)	240 lb (109 kg)	1958–10–01	Arizona State
G	11	Lee Mayberry	6 ft 1 in (1.85 m)	172 lb (78 kg)	1970–06–12	Arkansas
C	52	Eric Mobley	6 ft 11 in (2.11 m)	235 lb (107 kg)	1970–02–01	Pittsburgh
G	5	Eric Murdock	6 ft 1 in (1.85 m)	190 lb (86 kg)	1968–06–14	Providence
G	22	Johnny Newman	6 ft 7 in (2.01 m)	190 lb (86 kg)	1963–11–28	Richmond
F	54	Ed Pinckney	6 ft 9 in (2.06 m)	195 lb (88 kg)	1963–03–27	Villanova
F	13	Glenn Robinson	6 ft 7 in (2.01 m)	240 lb (109 kg)	1973–01–10	Purdue

Coaches
Head coach
- Mike Dunleavy, Sr.
Assistant(s)
- Butch Carter
- Jim Eyen
- Frank Hamblen
- Larry Riley

Legend
- (DP) Unsigned draft pick
- (FA) Free agent
- (S) Suspended
- (IN) Inactive
- Injured

Roster

=== Roster Notes ===
- Power forward Roy Hinson was on the injured reserve list due to a knee injury, missed the entire regular season, and never played for the Bucks.

== Regular season ==
=== Season standings ===
Central Division	W	L	PCT	GB	Home	Road	Div
y-Indiana Pacers	52	30	.634	–	33–8	19–22	18–10
x-Charlotte Hornets	50	32	.610	2	29–12	21–20	17–11
x-Chicago Bulls	47	35	.573	5	28–13	19–22	16–12
x-Cleveland Cavaliers	43	39	.524	9	26–15	17–24	17–11
x-Atlanta Hawks	42	40	.512	10	24–17	18–23	9–19
Milwaukee Bucks	34	48	.415	18	22–19	12–29	13–15
Detroit Pistons	28	54	.341	24	22–19	6–35	8–20

#	Eastern Conference				
#	Team	W	L	PCT	GB
1	c-Orlando Magic	57	25	.695	–
2	y-Indiana Pacers	52	30	.634	5
3	x-New York Knicks	55	27	.671	2
4	x-Charlotte Hornets	50	32	.610	7
5	x-Chicago Bulls	47	35	.573	10
6	x-Cleveland Cavaliers	43	39	.524	14
7	x-Atlanta Hawks	42	40	.512	15
8	x-Boston Celtics	35	47	.427	22
9	Milwaukee Bucks	34	48	.415	23
10	Miami Heat	32	50	.390	25
11	New Jersey Nets	30	52	.366	27
12	Detroit Pistons	28	54	.341	29
13	Philadelphia 76ers	24	58	.293	33
14	Washington Bullets	21	61	.256	36

z - clinched division title
y - clinched division title
x - clinched playoff spot

=== Game log ===
1994–95 game log
Total: 34–48 (Home: 22–19; Road: 12–29)
November: 5–7 (home: 2–4; road: 3–3)

Game	Date	Team	Score	High points	High rebounds	High assists	Location Attendance	Record
1	November 4, 1994	@ Philadelphia	W 91–86	Conlon, Newman (20)			CoreStates Spectrum; 16,114	1–0
2	November 5, 1994	L.A. Lakers	W 97–96	Baker (22)			Bradley Center; 18,633	2–0
3	November 10, 1994	@ Cleveland	L 88–108	Newman (30)			Gund Arena; 19,203	2–1
4	November 11, 1994	Charlotte	L 115–123				Bradley Center; 16,236	2–2
5	November 15, 1994	Indiana	W 82–81				Bradley Center; 15,264	3–2
6	November 19, 1994	@ Atlanta	W 97–93				The Omni; 11,862	4–2
7	November 19, 1994	Seattle	L 96–120				Bradley Center; 18,633	4–3
8	November 22, 1994	@ Boston	W 116–94				Hartford Civic Center; 12,829	5–3
9	November 23, 1994	@ Detroit	L 108–113				The Palace of Auburn Hills; 21,454	5–4
10	November 25, 1994	@ Indiana	L 106–111				Market Square Arena; 16,694	5–5
11	November 26, 1994	Orlando	L 105–113				Bradley Center; 18,633	5–6
12	November 29, 1994	Phoenix	L 106–123				Bradley Center; 14,564	5–7

December: 4–11 (home: 3–3; road: 1–8)

Game	Date	Team	Score	High points	High rebounds	High assists	Location Attendance	Record
13	December 1, 1994	Cleveland	L 87–93				Bradley Center; 13,648	5–8
14	December 3, 1994	@ Seattle	L 108–111				Tacoma Dome; 14,661	5–9
15	December 4, 1994	@ Portland	L 103–106				Memorial Coliseum; 12,888	5–10
16	December 6, 1994	@ Sacramento	L 95–108				ARCO Arena; 17,317	5–11
17	December 7, 1994	@ L. A. Clippers	L 94–96				Los Angeles Memorial Sports Arena; 6,433	5–12
18	December 10, 1994	Chicago	W 106–103				Bradley Center; 18,633	6–12
19	December 13, 1994	@ Charlotte	L 101–107				Charlotte Coliseum; 23,698	6–13
20	December 14, 1994	Philadelphia	W 99–96	Robinson (32)	Lister (13)	Mayberry (6)	Bradley Center; 13,785	7–13
21	December 18, 1994	Utah	L 98–101				Bradley Center; 16,624	7–14
22	December 20, 1994	@ Atlanta	L 97–115				The Omni; 8,818	7–15
23	December 21, 1994	@ Miami	L 112–122				Miami Arena; 14,402	7–16
24	December 23, 1994	@ Orlando	L 91–123				Orlando Arena; 16,010	7–17
25	December 26, 1994	New Jersey	W 101–97				Bradley Center; 16,475	8–17
26	December 27, 1994	@ Detroit	W 98–88				The Palace of Auburn Hills; 18,209	9–17
27	December 30, 1994	Charlotte	L 94–101				Bradley Center; 18,026	9–18

January: 8–8 (home: 4–3; road: 4–5)

Game	Date	Team	Score	High points	High rebounds	High assists	Location Attendance	Record
28	January 3, 1995	@ Utah	L 91–123				Delta Center; 18,701	9–19
29	January 5, 1995	@ Golden State	W 111–103				Oakland-Alameda County Coliseum Arena; 15,025	10–19
30	January 6, 1995	@ L.A. Lakers	L 98–111				The Forum; 13,227	10–20
31	January 8, 1995	@ Denver	L 96–102				McNichols Sports Arena; 17,171	10–21
32	January 9, 1995	@ Phoenix	L 102–119				American West Arena; 19,023	10–22
33	January 11, 1995	Sacramento	W 97–88				Bradley Center; 13,279	11–22
34	January 13, 1995	New York	L 88–91				Bradley Center; 17,909	11–23
35	January 14, 1995	@ Indiana	W 97–95				Market Square Arena; 16,716	12–23
36	January 18, 1995	@ Chicago	W 97–93				United Center; 22,191	13–23
37	January 19, 1995	Washington	W 120–115				Bradley Center; 13,311	14–23
38	January 21, 1995	Detroit	W 120–100				Bradley Center; 18,633	15–23
39	January 24, 1995; 7:30 p.m. CST	Houston	L 99–115	Conlon (21)	Baker (9)	Murdock (14)	Bradley Center; 14,556	15–24
40	January 25, 1995	@ Philadelphia	W 98–97				CoreStates Spectrum; 8,384	16–24
41	January 27, 1995	Miami	L 87–96				Bradley Center; 18,171	16–25
42	January 28, 1995	@ Orlando	L 103–107				Orlando Arena; 16,010	16–26
43	January 31, 1995	Dallas	W 107–105				Bradley Center; 15,398	17–26

February: 4–9 (home: 3–5; road: 1–4)

Game	Date	Team	Score	High points	High rebounds	High assists	Location Attendance	Record
All-Star Break

March: 6–9 (home: 5–3; road: 1–6)

Game	Date	Team	Score	High points	High rebounds	High assists	Location Attendance	Record

April: 7–4 (home: 5–1; road: 2–3)

Game	Date	Team	Score	High points	High rebounds	High assists	Location Attendance	Record
72	April 1, 1995; 7:30 p.m. CST	@ Houston	W 93–87	Robinson (29)	Newman (11)	Baker (5)	The Summit; 16,611	28–44

1994–95 schedule

== Player statistics ==
Legend
GP	Games played	GS	Games started	MPG	Minutes per game
FG%	Field-goal percentage	3P%	3-point field-goal percentage	FT%	Free-throw percentage
RPG	Rebounds per game	APG	Assists per game	SPG	Steals per game
BPG	Blocks per game	PPG	Points per game

Player	GP	GS	MPG	FG%	3FG%	FT%	RPG	APG	SPG	BPG	PPG
Glenn Robinson	80	76	37.0	45.1	32.1	79.6	6.4	2.5	1.4	0.3	21.9
Vin Baker	82	82	41.0	48.3	29.2	59.3	10.3	3.6	1.0	1.4	17.7
Todd Day	82	81	33.1	42.4	39.0	75.4	3.9	1.6	1.3	0.8	16.0
Eric Murdock	75	32	28.8	41.5	37.5	79.0	2.9	6.4	1.5	0.2	13.0
Marty Conlon	82	3	25.2	53.2	27.6	61.3	5.2	1.3	0.5	0.2	9.9
Johnny Newman	82	11	23.1	46.3	35.2	80.1	2.1	1.1	0.8	0.2	7.7
Lee Mayberry	82	50	21.3	42.2	40.7	69.9	1.0	3.4	0.6	0.0	5.8
Eric Mobley	46	26	12.8	59.1	100.0	48.9	3.3	0.5	0.2	0.6	3.9
Jon Barry	52	0	11.6	42.5	33.3	76.3	0.9	1.6	0.6	0.1	3.7
Danny Young	7	0	11.0	52.9	41.7	100.0	0.7	1.7	0.6	0.0	3.4
Alton Lister	60	32	12.9	49.3	0.0	50.0	3.9	0.2	0.3	1.0	2.8
Ed Pinckney	62	17	13.5	49.5	0.0	71.0	3.4	0.3	0.5	0.3	2.3
Aaron Williams	15	0	4.8	33.3	0.0	66.7	1.3	0.0	0.1	0.4	1.6
Tate George	3	0	2.7	33.3	0.0	100.0	0.3	0.0	0.0	0.0	1.3

Player statistics citation:

== Awards and records ==
- Glenn Robinson, NBA All-Rookie Team First Team

== Transactions ==
=== Trades ===
June 22, 1994
June 29, 1994
To Milwaukee Bucks----
- Roy Hinson
To Milwaukee Bucks----
- Andrei Fetisov
- Ed Pinckney
To Atlanta Hawks----
- Ken Norman
To Boston Celtics----
- Blue Edwards
- Derek Strong

=== Free agents ===
Player	Signed	Former team
Marty Conlon	August 3, 1994	Washington Bullets
Alton Lister	October 6, 1994	Golden State Warriors
Johnny Newman	October 7, 1994	New Jersey Nets

Player Transactions Citation:

== See also ==
- 1994-95 NBA season
