= 1994–95 Cleveland Cavaliers season =

NBA professional basketball team season

- Head coach: Mike Fratello
- Arena: Gund Arena

Results
- Record: 43–39 (.524)
- Place: Division: 4th (Central); Conference: 6th (Eastern)
- Playoff finish: First round (lost to Knicks 1–3)
- Stats at Basketball Reference

Local media
- Television: SportsChannel Ohio · WUAB
- Radio: WWWE

The 1994–95 Cleveland Cavaliers season was the 25th season for the Cleveland Cavaliers in the National Basketball Association.

== Season summary ==
=== Off-season ===
This was the Cavaliers' first season in which they played their home games at their new arena, the Gund Arena. During the off-season, the team signed free agents Michael Cage, and Tony Campbell. However, before the regular season began, the Cavaliers lost Brad Daugherty to a back injury, and Gerald Wilkins to a ruptured Achilles tendon, as both players were out for the entire season.

For the season, the Cavaliers redesigned their primary logo, replacing the color blue with black and light blue to their color scheme of orange and white; the team's primary logo featured an orange basketball going into a white net on a black square, above the team nickname "Cavs" in light blue letters with black inlines. The team also redesigned their home and road uniforms, adding a light blue splash across their jerseys and shorts, a black and light blue trim, and the team's primary logo on the right leg of their shorts. The white home uniforms featured the word "Cavs" in orange letters with black inlines on the front of their jerseys, while the road uniforms were changed from blue to black, and featured the city name "Cleveland" in orange letters with black inlines.

However, the Cavaliers' new uniforms were criticized and disliked by many fans and critics, and were even considered "ugly". The team's new primary logo would remain in use until 2003, while the new uniforms would be slightly redesigned in 1997, where they would alter the light blue splash from the right leg of their shorts.

=== Regular season ===
With the addition of Cage, and despite losing both Daugherty and Wilkins, the Cavaliers got off to a 9–8 start to the regular season, and then posted an 11-game winning streak in December, which led them to a 20–8 record. However, the team played below .500 in winning percentage for the remainder of the season, as Mark Price only played just 48 games due to a broken wrist injury; the team later on held a 28–19 record at the All-Star break. Price eventually returned, as the Cavaliers finished in fourth place in the Central Division with a 43–39 record, and earned the sixth seed in the Eastern Conference.

Price averaged 15.8 points and 7.0 assists per game, and led the Cavaliers with 103 three-point field goals, while Tyrone Hill averaged 13.8 points and 10.9 rebounds per game, and backup point guard Terrell Brandon, who stepped up in Price's absence, provided the team with 13.3 points, 5.4 assists and 1.6 steals per game. In addition, second-year forward Chris Mills became the team's starting small forward, averaging 12.3 points per game, while Hot Rod Williams provided with 12.6 points, 6.9 rebounds and 1.4 blocks per game, and Bobby Phills contributed 11.0 points and 1.4 steals per game. Meanwhile, Cage averaged 5.0 points and 6.9 rebounds per game, while off the bench, Danny Ferry contributed 7.5 points per game, and Campbell contributed 6.0 points per game.

During the NBA All-Star weekend at the America West Arena in Phoenix, Arizona, Hill was selected for the 1995 NBA All-Star Game, as a member of the Eastern Conference All-Star team; it was his first and only All-Star appearance. Hill also finished tied in seventh place in Most Improved Player voting, while head coach Mike Fratello finished in second place in Coach of the Year voting, behind Del Harris of the Los Angeles Lakers.

During this season, the Cavaliers were known as a low-scoring, defensive team, as Fratello switched to a slow-paced, defensive coaching style; the team finished last in the NBA in scoring averaging 90.5 points per game, while allowing 89.8 points per game from their opponents, which was the best in the league, and also had the third best team defensive rating. The Cavaliers also finished fourth in the NBA in home-game attendance, with an attendance of 833,850 at the Gund Arena during the regular season.

=== NBA playoffs ===
In the Eastern Conference First Round of the 1995 NBA playoffs, the Cavaliers faced off against the 3rd–seeded New York Knicks, who were led by All-Star center Patrick Ewing, All-Star guard John Starks, and Sixth Man of the Year, Anthony Mason. However, the Cavaliers were without Brandon, who suffered a leg injury during the final month of the regular season. The Cavaliers lost Game 1 to the Knicks on the road, 103–79 at Madison Square Garden, but managed to win Game 2 on the road, 90–84 to even the series. However, the Cavaliers lost the next two games at home, which included a Game 4 loss to the Knicks at the Gund Arena, 93–80, thus losing the series in four games.

=== Aftermath ===
Following the season, Price was traded to the Washington Bullets after nine seasons with the Cavaliers, while Williams was dealt to the Phoenix Suns, Wilkins was left unprotected in the 1995 NBA expansion draft, where he was selected by the Vancouver Grizzlies expansion team, Campbell was released to free agency, and John Battle retired.

== Draft picks ==
Round	Pick	Player	Position	Nationality	School/Club team
2	42	Gary Collier	Forward	United States	Tulsa

- 1st round pick (#16) traded to Golden State in Tyrone Hill deal. Used to draft Clifford Rozier.

== Roster ==
1994–95 Cleveland Cavaliers roster
Players

Pos.	No.	Player	Height	Weight	DOB	From
G	10	John Battle	6 ft 2 in (1.88 m)	175 lb (79 kg)	1962–11–09	Rutgers
G	11	Terrell Brandon	5 ft 11 in (1.80 m)	180 lb (82 kg)	1970–05–20	Oregon
C	44	Michael Cage	6 ft 9 in (2.06 m)	244 lb (111 kg)	1962–01–28	San Diego State
F	9	Tony Campbell	6 ft 7 in (2.01 m)	215 lb (98 kg)	1962–05–07	Ohio State
G	5	Steve Colter	6 ft 3 in (1.91 m)	165 lb (75 kg)	1962–07–24	New Mexico State
C	43	Brad Daugherty (IN)	7 ft 0 in (2.13 m)	245 lb (111 kg)	1965–10–19	North Carolina
C	30	Greg Dreiling	7 ft 1 in (2.16 m)	250 lb (113 kg)	1962–11–07	Kansas
F	35	Danny Ferry	6 ft 10 in (2.08 m)	230 lb (104 kg)	1966–10–17	Duke
C	32	Tyrone Hill	6 ft 9 in (2.06 m)	240 lb (109 kg)	1968–03–19	Xavier
F	24	Chris Mills	6 ft 6 in (1.98 m)	215 lb (98 kg)	1970–01–25	Arizona
G	14	Bobby Phills	6 ft 5 in (1.96 m)	200 lb (91 kg)	1969–12–20	Southern
G	25	Mark Price	6 ft 0 in (1.83 m)	170 lb (77 kg)	1964–02–15	Georgia Tech
F	31	Fred Roberts	6 ft 10 in (2.08 m)	218 lb (99 kg)	1960–08–14	BYU
G/F	21	Gerald Wilkins (IN)	6 ft 6 in (1.98 m)	185 lb (84 kg)	1963–09–11	Chattanooga
F/C	18	Hot Rod Williams	6 ft 11 in (2.11 m)	215 lb (98 kg)	1962–08–09	Tulane

Coaches
Head coach
- Mike Fratello
Assistant(s)
- Jim Boylan
- Sidney Lowe
- Ron Rothstein

Legend
- (DP) Unsigned draft pick
- (FA) Free agent
- (S) Suspended
- (IN) Inactive
- Injured

Roster
Updated: March 16, 1995

=== Roster notes ===
- Center Brad Daugherty was on the injured reserve list due to a back injury, and missed the entire regular season.
- Guard/forward Gerald Wilkins was on the injured reserve list due to a ruptured Achilles tendon, and missed the entire regular season.

== Regular season ==
=== Season standings ===
Central Division	W	L	PCT	GB	Home	Road	Div
y-Indiana Pacers	52	30	.634	–	33–8	19–22	18–10
x-Charlotte Hornets	50	32	.610	2	29–12	21–20	17–11
x-Chicago Bulls	47	35	.573	5	28–13	19–22	16–12
x-Cleveland Cavaliers	43	39	.524	9	26–15	17–24	17–11
x-Atlanta Hawks	42	40	.512	10	24–17	18–23	9–19
Milwaukee Bucks	34	48	.415	18	22–19	12–29	13–15
Detroit Pistons	28	54	.341	24	22–19	6–35	8–20

#	Eastern Conference				
#	Team	W	L	PCT	GB
1	c-Orlando Magic	57	25	.695	–
2	y-Indiana Pacers	52	30	.634	5
3	x-New York Knicks	55	27	.671	2
4	x-Charlotte Hornets	50	32	.610	7
5	x-Chicago Bulls	47	35	.573	10
6	x-Cleveland Cavaliers	43	39	.524	14
7	x-Atlanta Hawks	42	40	.512	15
8	x-Boston Celtics	35	47	.427	22
9	Milwaukee Bucks	34	48	.415	23
10	Miami Heat	32	50	.390	25
11	New Jersey Nets	30	52	.366	27
12	Detroit Pistons	28	54	.341	29
13	Philadelphia 76ers	24	58	.293	33
14	Washington Bullets	21	61	.256	36

== Game log ==
=== Regular season ===
1994–95 game log
Total: 43–39 (home: 26–15; road: 17–24)
November: 8–5 (home: 5–2; road: 3–3)

Game	Date	Team	Score	High points	High rebounds	High assists	Location Attendance	Record
1	November 5	@ Charlotte	W 115–107	Price (27)			Charlotte Coliseum; 23,698	1–0
2	November 8, 1994; 8:00 p.m. EST	Houston	L 98–100	Brandon (19)	Williams (10)	Brandon, Phills, Price (7)	Gund Arena; 20,562	1–1
3	November 10	Milwaukee	W 108–88	Price (18)			Gund Arena; 19,203	2–1
4	November 12	Indiana	L 86–93	Price (15)			Gund Arena; 20,401	2–2
5	November 15	Charlotte	W 89–86 (OT)	Hill (22)			Gund Arena; 19,959	3–2
6	November 17	@ Portland	W 81–80	Price (30)			Memorial Coliseum; 12,888	4–2
7	November 18	@ L.A. Lakers	L 80–82	Williams (16)			Great Western Forum; 10,177	4–3
8	November 20	@ Sacramento	L 88–96	Williams (17)			ARCO Arena; 17,317	4–4
9	November 22	Minnesota	W 112–79	Price (17)			Gund Arena; 19,125	5–4
10	November 23	@ Miami	L 87–100	Mills, Price (17)			Miami Arena; 14,498	5–5
11	November 25	@ Washington	W 96–94	Hill (25)			USAir Arena; 12,756	6–5
12	November 26	Golden State	W 101–87	Price (31)			Gund Arena; 20,562	7–5
13	November 30	L.A. Lakers	W 117–79	Brandon, Campbell, Price (16)			Gund Arena; 19,014	8–5

December: 12–3 (home: 6–2; road: 6–1)

Game	Date	Team	Score	High points	High rebounds	High assists	Location Attendance	Record
14	December 1	@ Milwaukee	W 93–87	Price (17)			Bradley Center; 13,648	9–5
15	December 3	Philadelphia	L 78–83	Price (18)			Gund Arena; 20,089	9–6
16	December 6	Orlando	L 97–114	Brandon, Williams (14)			Gund Arena; 20,562	9–7
17	December 7	@ Orlando	L 75–90	Mills (14)			Orlando Arena; 16,010	9–8
18	December 9	@ Boston	W 96–89	Williams (20)			Boston Garden; 14,890	10–8
19	December 10	Detroit	W 97–89	Mills (17)			Gund Arena; 19,129	11–8
20	December 13	Indiana	W 90–83	Mills (17)			Gund Arena; 19,191	12–8
21	December 14	@ New Jersey	W 95–88 (2OT)	Williams (20)			Brendan Byrne Arena; 9,027	13–8
22	December 16	@ Philadelphia	W 84–80	Brandon (15)			CoreStates Spectrum; 9,830	14–8
23	December 19	@ Chicago	W 77–63	Williams (18)			United Center; 22,301	15–8
24	December 22	@ New York	W 93–90	Phills (24)			Madison Square Garden; 19,763	16–8
25	December 23	New Jersey	W 80–75	Hill (18)			Gund Arena; 20,562	17–8
26	December 26	Boston	W 123–102	Price (36)			Gund Arena; 20,562	18–8
27	December 28	Washington	W 91–75	Phills (22)			Gund Arena; 20,562	19–8
28	December 30	Atlanta	W 87–85	Price (30)			Gund Arena; 20,562	20–8

January: 6–8 (home: 2–5; road: 4–3)

Game	Date	Team	Score	High points	High rebounds	High assists	Location Attendance	Record
29	January 4	Seattle	L 85–116	Williams (17)			Gund Arena; 20,562	20–9
30	January 6	New York	L 93–103	Hill (26)			Gund Arena; 20,562	20–10
31	January 7	Chicago	W 92–78	Brandon (24)			Gund Arena; 20,562	21–10
32	January 10	Charlotte	L 108–116 (OT)	Hill (23)			Gund Arena; 20,562	21–11
33	January 12	@ Phoenix	W 107–96	Brandon (30)			America West Arena; 19,023	22–11
34	January 14	@ Golden State	W 103–97 (OT)	Hill (20)			Oakland-Alameda County Coliseum Arena; 15,025	23–11
35	January 17	@ Seattle	L 91–115	Brandon (20)			Tacoma Dome; 12,914	23–12
36	January 18	@ L.A. Clippers	L 83–92	Mills (19)			Los Angeles Memorial Sports Arena; 6,695	23–13
37	January 20	@ Utah	L 84–94	Brandon (24)			Delta Center; 19,911	23–14
38	January 21	@ Denver	W 101–100 (2OT)	Mills (20)			McNichols Sports Arena; 17,171	24–14
39	January 23	L.A. Clippers	W 90–68	Hill (26)			Gund Arena; 20,187	25–14
40	January 26	@ Atlanta	W 77–68	Hill, Mills (14)			The Omni; 10,760	26–14
41	January 27	Portland	L 77–87	Williams (14)			Gund Arena; 20,562	26–15
42	January 30	Phoenix	L 82–89	Brandon (20)			Gund Arena; 20,562	26–16

February: 7–6 (home: 4–1; road: 3–5)

Game	Date	Team	Score	High points	High rebounds	High assists	Location Attendance	Record
43	February 1	@ Indiana	L 82–101	Williams (14)			Market Square Arena; 13,972	26–17
44	February 2	@ Detroit	L 83–85	Brandon (15)			The Palace of Auburn Hills; 13,286	26–18
45	February 4	Indiana	W 82–73	Williams (19)			Gund Arena; 20,562	27–18
46	February 7	Philadelphia	W 90–84	Hill, Williams (16)			Gund Arena; 20,130	28–18
47	February 8	@ Boston	L 67–75	Brandon (19)			Boston Garden; 14,890	28–19
All-Star Break
48	February 15	Orlando	W 100–99 (OT)	Brandon (31)			Gund Arena; 20,562	29–19
49	February 16	@ Milwaukee	W 106–85	Mills (23)			Bradley Center; 13,498	30–19
50	February 18	@ New Jersey	W 82–75	Mills (23)			Brendan Byrne Arena; 15,652	31–19
51	February 20	Miami	L 96–103	Williams (20)			Gund Arena; 20,562	31–20
52	February 21	@ New York	W 99–91	Ferry (20)			Madison Square Garden; 19,763	32–20
53	February 25	New Jersey	W 105–102	Ferry (24)			Gund Arena; 20,562	33–20
54	February 27, 1995; 8:30 p.m. EST	@ Houston	L 78–86	Brandon (26)	Cage (10)	Brandon (4)	The Summit; 14,253	33–21
55	February 28	@ San Antonio	L 83–100	Brandon (17)			Alamodome; 15,546	33–22

March: 6–9 (home: 5–3; road: 1–6)

Game	Date	Team	Score	High points	High rebounds	High assists	Location Attendance	Record
56	March 2	@ Dallas	L 84–90	Mills (16)			Reunion Arena; 12,194	33–23
57	March 4	New York	L 76–89	Williams (20)			Gund Arena; 20,562	33–24
58	March 7	Detroit	W 89–81	Mills (24)			Gund Arena; 20,562	34–24
59	March 9	San Antonio	L 98–100	Brandon (24)			Gund Arena; 20,562	34–25
60	March 10	@ Chicago	L 76–99	Hill (13)			United Center; 22,362	34–26
61	March 12	@ Philadelphia	W 92–72	Brandon, Ferry, Mills (14)			CoreStates Spectrum; 10,221	35–26
62	March 16	Utah	W 93–85	Phills (24)			Gund Arena; 20,562	36–26
63	March 17	@ Minnesota	L 77–80	Price (18)			Target Center; 14,222	36–27
64	March 19	@ Washington	L 90–96	Price (16)			USAir Arena; 17,110	36–28
65	March 20	Dallas	L 100–102 (2OT)	Hill (29)			Gund Arena; 20,562	36–29
66	March 22	Sacramento	W 101–89	Price (23)			Gund Arena; 20,562	37–29
67	March 24	Atlanta	W 75–74	Hill (24)			Gund Arena; 20,562	38–29
68	March 25	@ Charlotte	L 97–105	Mills (26)			Charlotte Coliseum; 23,698	38–30
69	March 29	@ Indiana	L 96–107	Mills (22)			Market Square Arena; 16,619	38–31
70	March 31	Washington	W 98–88	Mills (24)			Gund Arena; 20,562	39–31

April: 4–8 (home: 4–2; road: 0–6)

Game	Date	Team	Score	High points	High rebounds	High assists	Location Attendance	Record
71	April 2	Denver	L 101–104	Price (21)			Gund Arena; 20,562	39–32
72	April 4	Boston	L 92–97	Phills (17)			Gund Arena; 20,562	39–33
73	April 5	@ Atlanta	L 87–96	Williams (14)			The Omni; 12,539	39–34
74	April 7	@ Chicago	L 88–97	Phills (22)			United Center; 23,664	39–35
75	April 9	Chicago	W 79–78	Price (20)			Gund Arena; 20,562	40–35
76	April 11	@ Orlando	L 90–107	Hill (24)			Orlando Arena; 16,010	40–36
77	April 13	@ Miami	L 84–85	Price (20)			Miami Arena; 14,311	40–37
78	April 14	Atlanta	W 83–70	Hill, Williams (16)			Gund Arena; 20,562	41–37
79	April 18	@ Detroit	L 76–85	Phills (17)			The Palace of Auburn Hills; 17,203	41–38
80	April 19	Miami	W 103–82	Hill (21)			Gund Arena; 20,562	42–38
81	April 21	Milwaukee	W 103–82	Williams (24)			Gund Arena; 20,562	42–38
82	April 23	@ Charlotte	L 72–97	Phills (13)			Charlotte Coliseum; 23,698	43–39

1994–95 schedule

== Playoffs ==
1995 playoff game log
First round: 1–3 (home: 0–2; road: 1–1)

Game	Date	Team	Score	High points	High rebounds	High assists	Location Attendance	Series
1	April 27	@ New York	L 79–103	Danny Ferry (20)	Tyrone Hill (8)	Mark Price (4)	Madison Square Garden; 19,763	0–1
2	April 29	@ New York	W 90–84	Mills, Phills (21)	Hot Rod Williams (6)	Mark Price (7)	Madison Square Garden; 19,763	1–1
3	May 1	New York	L 81–83	Mark Price (21)	Michael Cage (8)	Mark Price (6)	Gund Arena; 19,352	1–2
4	May 4	New York	L 80–93	Bobby Phills (20)	Hot Rod Williams (7)	Mark Price (9)	Gund Arena; 18,575	1–3

1995 schedule

== Player stats ==
Legend
GP	Games played	GS	Games started	MPG	Minutes per game
FG%	Field-goal percentage	3P%	3-point field-goal percentage	FT%	Free-throw percentage
RPG	Rebounds per game	APG	Assists per game	SPG	Steals per game
BPG	Blocks per game	PPG	Points per game

=== Regular season ===
Player	GP	GS	MPG	FG%	3P%	FT%	RPG	APG	SPG	BPG	PPG
Mark Price	48	34	28.6	41.3	40.7	91.4	2.3	7.0	0.7	0.1	15.8
Tyrone Hill	70	67	34.2	50.4	0.0	66.2	10.9	0.8	0.8	0.6	13.8
Terrell Brandon	67	41	29.3	44.8	39.7	85.5	2.8	5.4	1.6	0.2	13.3
Hot Rod Williams	74	73	35.7	45.2	20.0	68.5	6.9	2.6	1.1	1.4	12.6
Chris Mills	80	79	35.2	42.0	39.2	81.7	4.6	1.9	0.7	0.4	12.3
Bobby Phills	80	79	31.3	41.4	34.5	77.9	3.3	2.3	1.4	0.3	11.0
Danny Ferry	82	6	15.7	44.6	40.3	88.1	1.7	1.2	0.3	0.3	7.5
Tony Campbell	78	0	14.5	41.1	35.7	83.0	2.0	0.9	0.4	0.1	6.0
Michael Cage	82	21	24.9	52.1	0.0	60.2	6.9	0.7	0.7	0.8	5.0
John Battle	28	0	10.0	37.7	35.5	73.1	0.4	1.3	0.3	0.0	4.1
Fred Roberts	21	0	10.6	38.9	36.4	76.9	1.6	0.4	0.3	0.1	3.8
Elmer Bennett	4	0	4.5	54.5	0.0	75.0	0.3	0.8	1.0	0.0	3.8
Steve Colter	57	7	13.2	39.6	22.9	76.1	1.0	1.8	0.5	0.1	3.4
Greg Dreiling	58	3	8.3	41.2	0.0	63.4	2.0	0.4	0.1	0.4	1.9
Gerald Madkins	7	0	4.0	33.3	50.0	75.0	0.0	0.1	0.3	0.0	1.1

=== Playoffs ===
Player	GP	GS	MPG	FG%	3P%	FT%	RPG	APG	SPG	BPG	PPG
Mark Price	4	4	35.8	30.0	23.5	97.0	3.0	6.5	1.5	0.0	15.0
Bobby Phills	4	4	36.5	44.2	57.1	75.0	3.0	1.5	2.3	0.0	14.3
Chris Mills	4	4	34.8	54.1	57.1	100.0	4.0	2.8	0.8	0.5	13.3
Danny Ferry	4	0	16.8	52.0	53.3	66.7	0.8	1.5	0.5	0.0	9.5
Tyrone Hill	4	4	34.8	31.0	0.0	64.0	5.8	0.8	1.8	0.3	8.5
Hot Rod Williams	4	4	36.0	28.6	0.0	37.5	6.3	2.8	2.3	0.8	6.8
Fred Roberts	1	0	7.0	75.0	0.0	0.0	2.0	0.0	0.0	0.0	6.0
Tony Campbell	4	0	9.3	42.9	50.0	83.3	0.5	0.3	0.3	0.3	5.8
Michael Cage	4	0	20.3	44.4	0.0	0.0	4.5	0.8	0.5	1.0	4.0
Steve Colter	4	0	10.8	50.0	0.0	50.0	0.3	0.5	0.3	0.0	3.0
John Battle	2	0	3.5	66.7	0.0	0.0	0.0	0.5	0.0	0.0	2.0
Greg Dreiling	1	0	7.0	0.0	0.0	0.0	1.0	0.0	0.0	0.0	0.0

Player statistics citation:
