= David Wingate (basketball) =

American basketball player (born 1963)

Personal information
- Born: December 15, 1963 (age 62) Baltimore, Maryland, U.S.
- Listed height: 6 ft 5 in (1.96 m)
- Listed weight: 187 lb (85 kg)

Career information
- High school: Paul Laurence Dunbar (Baltimore, Maryland)
- College: Georgetown (1982–1986)
- NBA draft: 1986: 2nd round, 44th overall pick
- Drafted by: Philadelphia 76ers
- Playing career: 1986–2001
- Position: Shooting guard / small forward
- Number: 25, 55, 11, 26

Career history
- 1986–1989: Philadelphia 76ers
- 1989–1991: San Antonio Spurs
- 1991–1992: Washington Bullets
- 1992–1995: Charlotte Hornets
- 1995–1998: Seattle SuperSonics
- 1999–2000: New York Knicks
- 2000–2001: Seattle SuperSonics

Career highlights
- NCAA champion (1984); 2× Second-team All-Big East (1984, 1986); Third-team All-Big East (1985); Second-team Parade All-American (1982)

Career NBA statistics
- Points: 4,166 (5.6 ppg)
- Rebounds: 1,420 (1.9 rpg)
- Assists: 1,376 (1.9 apg)
- Stats at NBA.com
- Stats at Basketball Reference

David Grover Stacey Wingate Jr. (born December 15, 1963) is an American former professional basketball player. The shooting guard-small forward spent 15 years in the National Basketball Association (NBA) with six teams.

== High school and college career ==
Wingate played high school basketball for the Dunbar Poets of Dunbar High School, where he played alongside fellow NBA players Muggsy Bogues, Reggie Lewis, and Reggie Williams. The 1981–82 Poets finished the season at 29–0, and the following year, after Wingate's graduation, finished 31–0 and were ranked first in the nation by USA Today. At the end of his senior season, it was expected Wingate would attend the University of Maryland, but instead he decided to attend Georgetown University.

As a freshman for the Georgetown Hoyas men's basketball team during the 1982–83 season, Wingate was named to the Big East Conference all-rookie team. The following season, he made the transition from a guard-forward hybrid to playing primarily at the shooting guard position, as the small forward position was filled by incoming freshman and fellow Dunbar alum Reggie Williams. During his sophomore year, Wingate led the team in steals and scored about 11 points per game, en route to Georgetown winning the 1984 NCAA Men's Division I Basketball Tournament. Wingate's junior season saw Georgetown miss repeating as national champions, losing to Villanova University in the final of the 1985 NCAA Men's Division I Basketball Tournament. It also was one of Wingate's best defensive seasons, earning career-high totals in assists and steals, and leading the team with 16 points in their championship match-up against Villanova. He averaged 16 points a game in his senior year, trailing only Williams, and played 1,000 minutes without fouling out. Upon graduation, Wingate was the Hoyas' third all-time leading scorer behind Eric Floyd and Patrick Ewing.

== Professional career ==
Wingate had a 15-year NBA career spanning from 1986 to 2001. He was selected in the second round with the 44th pick of the 1986 NBA draft by the Philadelphia 76ers. His selection in the second round surprised some, with 76ers coach Matt Guokas saying, "In a lot of people's eyes, he was a first-round pick" and that he was "one of the people we would have considered" had they not traded their first-round pick. After fighting for a spot on the 76ers roster, Wingate made his debut on November 2, 1986. He played nine minutes in his debut against the Atlanta Hawks, and made his first start against the Cleveland Cavaliers on March 10, 1987, scoring 22 points in 46 minutes. He finished the season having played in 77 games, averaging two assists and 8.8 points per game.

He played for the San Antonio Spurs, Washington Bullets, Charlotte Hornets, Seattle SuperSonics and New York Knicks. Wingate retired with the Sonics in 2001, after having played a total of 28 games in his final three NBA seasons.

== Personal life ==
In 1990 Wingate was accused of rape by two women, being charged criminally for one incident and sued civilly for both. A settlement was reached civilly and Wingate's criminal charges were later withdrawn. In 1992 Wingate's ex-fiancee accused him of punching her in the face multiple times. Wingate has five children: Cynthia Alixandra, Brandi Allstin, Davion, Ashley and Aminah.

== Career statistics ==
Legend
GP	Games played	GS	Games started	MPG	Minutes per game
FG%	Field goal percentage	3P%	3-point field goal percentage	FT%	Free throw percentage
RPG	Rebounds per game	APG	Assists per game	SPG	Steals per game
BPG	Blocks per game	PPG	Points per game	**Bold**	Career high
*	Led the league

=== NBA ===
==== Regular season ====
Year	Team	GP	GS	MPG	FG%	3P%	FT%	RPG	APG	SPG	BPG	PPG
1986–87	Philadelphia	77	9	20.9	.430	.250	.741	2.0	2.0	1.2	.2	8.8
1987–88	Philadelphia	61	22	23.3	.400	.250	.750	1.7	2.0	.8	**.4**	**8.9**
1988–89	Philadelphia	33	6	11.3	.470	.333	.794	1.1	2.2	.3	.1	4.2
1989–90	San Antonio	78	2	23.8	.448	.000	.777	2.5	2.7	1.1	.2	6.8
1990–91	San Antonio	25	0	22.5	.384	.111	.707	3.0	1.8	.8	.2	5.4
1991–92	Washington	**81**	**72**	**26.3**	.465	.056	.719	**3.3**	**3.0**	**1.5**	.3	7.9
1992–93	Charlotte	72	55	20.4	.536	.167	.738	2.4	2.5	.9	.1	6.1
1993–94	Charlotte	50	36	20.1	.481	.333	.667	2.7	2.1	.8	.1	6.2
1994–95	Charlotte	52	9	9.9	.410	.182	.750	1.2	1.1	.4	.1	2.3
1995–96	Seattle	60	3	11.6	.415	**.441**	.780	.9	1.0	.3	.1	3.7
1996–97	Seattle	65	2	14.3	.416	.352	**.825**	1.1	1.2	.7	.1	3.6
1997–98	Seattle	58	2	9.4	.471	.429	.517	1.4	.6	.2	.1	2.6
1998–99	New York	20	0	4.6	.428	–	–	.4	.3	.2	.0	.7
1999–00	New York	7	0	4.6	.111	–	–	.3	.4	.1	.3	.3
2000–01	Seattle	1	0	9.0	**1.000**	–	–	.0	2.0	.0	.0	6.0
Career		740	218	17.9	.445	.272	.738	1.9	1.9	.8	.2	5.6

==== Playoffs ====
Year	Team	GP	GS	MPG	FG%	3P%	FT%	RPG	APG	SPG	BPG	PPG
1987	Philadelphia	5	0	18.0	.405	**1.000**	.643	2.4	1.8	1.0	.2	8.2
1990	San Antonio	10	0	**29.3**	**.519**	.667	.750	**3.7**	**3.8**	**1.8**	**.3**	**9.1**
1991	San Antonio	3	0	12.7	.500	–	.667	1.0	.3	.3	.0	4.7
1993	Charlotte	9	0	13.0	.364	–	.375	1.3	1.7	.4	.1	2.1
1995	Charlotte	4	**4**	18.3	.481	.333	.667	1.5	**3.8**	1.0	.0	8.0
1996	Seattle	**13**	0	5.2	.438	.500	**1.000**	.2	.0	.0	.0	1.5
1997	Seattle	12	0	16.0	.424	.387	.692	3.1	1.2	.4	**.3**	6.4
1998	Seattle	3	0	4.3	.400	–	.667	1.3	.7	.3	.0	2.7
Career		59	4	15.0	.454	.432	.667	1.9	1.6	.6	.1	5.1
