= 1994–95 Detroit Pistons season =

NBA team season

- Head coach: Don Chaney
- General manager: Billy McKinney
- Owners: William Davidson
- Arena: The Palace of Auburn Hills

Results
- Record: 28–54 (.341)
- Place: Division: 7th (Central); Conference: 12th (Eastern)
- Playoff finish: Did not qualify
- Stats at Basketball Reference

Local media
- Television: WKBD-TV; PASS Sports
- Radio: WJR

The 1994–95 Detroit Pistons season was the 47th season for the Detroit Pistons in the National Basketball Association, and their 38th season in Detroit, Michigan.

== Season summary ==
=== Off-season ===
After finishing with a miserable 20–62 record the previous season, along with the retirements of Bill Laimbeer and Isiah Thomas, the Pistons received the third overall pick in the 1994 NBA draft, and selected small forward Grant Hill out of Duke University. The team also signed free agents Oliver Miller, Johnny Dawkins, and Rafael Addison, and acquired Mark West from the Phoenix Suns during the off-season.

For the season, the Pistons revealed new red alternate road uniforms, which featured a blue and white trim, and blue side panels with white inlines on their jerseys and shorts; these uniforms would remain in use until the franchise's 1996 teal-colored rebrand.

=== Regular season ===
With the addition of Hill, Miller, Dawkins and West, the Pistons played above .500 in winning percentage with an 8–7 start to the regular season. However, the team struggled losing 13 of their next 14 games, which included an eight-game losing streak between December and January, and later on held a 17–29 record at the All-Star break. Second-year guard Lindsey Hunter only played just 42 games due to foot and ankle injuries, and Dawkins was released to free agency after 50 games. The Pistons posted a six-game losing streak in March, and lost eight of their final nine games of the season, finishing in last place in the Central Division with a 28–54 record.

Hill became an immediate fan favorite averaging 19.9 points, 6.4 rebounds, 5.0 assists and 1.8 steals per game, and was named to the NBA All-Rookie First Team, and was also named the co-NBA Rookie of the Year along with Jason Kidd of the Dallas Mavericks, while Joe Dumars averaged 18.1 points and 5.5 assists per game, and contributed 103 three-point field goals. In addition, Terry Mills provided the team with 15.5 points and 7.8 rebounds per game, while second-year guard Allan Houston showed improvement averaging 14.5 points per game, and leading the Pistons with 158 three-point field goals, and Miller averaged 8.5 points, 7.4 rebounds and 1.8 blocks per game. Meanwhile, Addison contributed 8.3 points per game off the bench, but was released by the team to free agency shortly before the regular season had ended, while Hunter contributed 7.5 points, 3.8 assists and 1.2 steals per game, and West provided with 7.5 points, 6.1 rebounds and 1.5 blocks per game.

During the NBA All-Star weekend at the America West Arena in Phoenix, Arizona, Hill and Dumars were both selected for the 1995 NBA All-Star Game, as members of the Eastern Conference All-Star team; it was Hill's first ever All-Star appearance, as he also became the first rookie ever to lead in All-Star voting. Houston finished in fifth place in Most Improved Player voting. The Pistons finished eighth in the NBA in home-game attendance, with an attendance of 719,090 at The Palace of Auburn Hills during the regular season.

=== Aftermath ===
Following the season, Miller was left unprotected in the 1995 NBA expansion draft, where he was selected by the Toronto Raptors expansion team, and head coach Don Chaney was fired.

== Draft picks ==
Round	Pick	Player	Position	Nationality	College
1	3	Grant Hill	SF	United States	Duke
2	48	Jevon Crudup	PF	United States	Missouri

== Roster ==
1994–95 Detroit Pistons roster
Players

Pos.	No.	Player	Height	Weight	DOB	From
F	17	Bill Curley	6 ft 9 in (2.06 m)	220 lb (100 kg)	1972–05–29	Boston College
G	12	Johnny Dawkins	6 ft 2 in (1.88 m)	165 lb (75 kg)	1963–09–28	Duke
G	4	Joe Dumars	6 ft 3 in (1.91 m)	190 lb (86 kg)	1963–05–24	McNeese State
F	33	Grant Hill	6 ft 8 in (2.03 m)	225 lb (102 kg)	1972–10–05	Duke
G	20	Allan Houston	6 ft 6 in (1.98 m)	200 lb (91 kg)	1971–04–20	Tennessee
G	1	Lindsey Hunter	6 ft 2 in (1.88 m)	170 lb (77 kg)	1970–12–03	Jackson State
G	32	Negele Knight	6 ft 1 in (1.85 m)	175 lb (79 kg)	1967–03–06	Dayton
C	45	Eric Leckner	6 ft 11 in (2.11 m)	265 lb (120 kg)	1966–05–27	Wyoming
G	2	Mark Macon	6 ft 4 in (1.93 m)	185 lb (84 kg)	1969–04–14	Temple
F	25	Oliver Miller	6 ft 9 in (2.06 m)	280 lb (127 kg)	1970–04–06	Arkansas
F	6	Terry Mills	6 ft 10 in (2.08 m)	230 lb (104 kg)	1967–12–21	Michigan
C	41	Mark West	6 ft 10 in (2.08 m)	230 lb (104 kg)	1960–11–05	Old Dominion

Coaches
Head coach
- Don Chaney
Assistant(s)
- K. C. Jones
- Brendan Malone
- Walt Perrin
- Mike Abdenour (trainer)

Legend
- (DP) Unsigned draft pick
- (FA) Free agent
- (S) Suspended
- Injured

Roster
Updated: April 19, 1995

=== Roster Notes ===
- Small forward Rafael Addison was waived on April 19, 1995.

== Regular season ==
=== Season standings ===
Central Division	W	L	PCT	GB	Home	Road	Div
y-Indiana Pacers	52	30	.634	–	33–8	19–22	18–10
x-Charlotte Hornets	50	32	.610	2	29–12	21–20	17–11
x-Chicago Bulls	47	35	.573	5	28–13	19–22	16–12
x-Cleveland Cavaliers	43	39	.524	9	26–15	17–24	17–11
x-Atlanta Hawks	42	40	.512	10	24–17	18–23	9–19
Milwaukee Bucks	34	48	.415	18	22–19	12–29	13–15
Detroit Pistons	28	54	.341	24	22–19	6–35	8–20

#	Eastern Conference				
#	Team	W	L	PCT	GB
1	c-Orlando Magic	57	25	.695	–
2	y-Indiana Pacers	52	30	.634	5
3	x-New York Knicks	55	27	.671	2
4	x-Charlotte Hornets	50	32	.610	7
5	x-Chicago Bulls	47	35	.573	10
6	x-Cleveland Cavaliers	43	39	.524	14
7	x-Atlanta Hawks	42	40	.512	15
8	x-Boston Celtics	35	47	.427	22
9	Milwaukee Bucks	34	48	.415	23
10	Miami Heat	32	50	.390	25
11	New Jersey Nets	30	52	.366	27
12	Detroit Pistons	28	54	.341	29
13	Philadelphia 76ers	24	58	.293	33
14	Washington Bullets	21	61	.256	36

z - clinched division title
y - clinched division title
x - clinched playoff spot

=== Game log ===
1994–95 game log
Total: 28–54 (Home: 22–19; Road: 6–35)
November: 7–6 (home: 5–2; road: 2–4)

Game	Date	Team	Score	High points	High rebounds	High assists	Location Attendance	Record
1	November 4	L.A. Lakers	L 98–115	Grant Hill (25)	Mark West (13)	Grant Hill (5)	The Palace of Auburn Hills; 21,454	0–1
2	November 5	@ Atlanta	W 114–109 (OT)	Grant Hill (24)	Terry Mills (10)	Joe Dumars (6)	The Omni; 11,587	1–1
3	November 8	Minnesota	W 126–112	Joe Dumars (40)	Rafael Addison, Lindsey Hunter (5)	Lindsey Hunter (9)	The Palace of Auburn Hills; 13,424	2–1
4	November 10	Indiana	W 112–110	Grant Hill (23)	Terry Mills (11)	Lindsey Hunter (7)	The Palace of Auburn Hills; 15,355	3–1
5	November 12	@ Charlotte	L 100–113	Grant Hill (25)	Terry Mills, Oliver Miller, Johnny Dawkins (6)	Lindsey Hunter (4)	Charlotte Coliseum; 23,698	3–2
6	November 15	Philadelphia	W 99–98	Grant Hill (22)	Terry Mills (12)	Lindsey Hunter (7)	The Palace of Auburn Hills; 14,189	4–2
7	November 17	@ Denver	W 94–92	Joe Dumars (21)	Grant Hill (7)	Johnny Dawkins (6)	McNichols Sports Arena; 17,171	5–2
8	November 18	@ Utah	L 96–121	Grant Hill (16)	Eric Leckner, Oliver Miller, Bill Curley (5)	Johnny Dawkins (5)	Delta Center; 19,911	5–3
9	November 20	@ Portland	L 96–98	Joe Dumars (35)	Terry Mills (6)	Grant Hill, Johnny Dawkins (5)	Memorial Coliseum; 12,888	5–4
10	November 23	Milwaukee	W 113–108	Terry Mills (24)	Terry Mills (14)	Grant Hill (7)	The Palace of Auburn Hills; 21,454	6–4
11	November 25	Miami	L 97–111	Terry Mills (21)	Terry Mills, Mark West (10)	Lindsey Hunter, Joe Dumars (5)	The Palace of Auburn Hills; 20,284	6–5
12	November 27	Golden State	W 106–91	Joe Dumars, Grant Hill (21)	Terry Mills (14)	Johnny Dawkins (8)	The Palace of Auburn Hills; 15,189	7–5
13	November 30	@ Boston	L 115–118	Terry Mills (37)	Oliver Miller (15)	Joe Dumars (9)	Boston Garden; 14,890	7–6

December: 2–11 (home: 1–5; road: 1–6)

Game	Date	Team	Score	High points	High rebounds	High assists	Location Attendance	Record
14	December 2	@ Washington	L 104–115	Grant Hill (28)	Terry Mills (9)	Joe Dumars (5)	USAir Arena; 18,756	7–7
15	December 3	Phoenix	W 107–97	Grant Hill (19)	Oliver Miller (10)	Grant Hill, Johnny Dawkins, Joe Dumars (4)	The Palace of Auburn Hills; 21,454	8–7
16	December 6	@ Indiana	L 83–90	Terry Mills (16)	Oliver Miller, Grant Hill (7)	Oliver Miller (5)	Market Square Arena; 14,361	8–8
17	December 9	Chicago	L 96–117	Lindsey Hunter, Oliver Miller (18)	Oliver Miller (10)	Johnny Dawkins (6)	The Palace of Auburn Hills; 21,454	8–9
18	December 10	@ Cleveland	L 79–87	Allan Houston (28)	Terry Mills (9)	Johnny Dawkins (6)	Gund Arena; 19,129	8–10
19	December 13	@ Chicago	L 78–98	Joe Dumars, Terry Mills (16)	Terry Mills (13)	Joe Dumars (5)	United Center; 22,224	8–11
20	December 14	Charlotte	L 93–106	Grant Hill (21)	Mark West (17)	Joe Dumars (9)	The Palace of Auburn Hills; 15,528	8–12
21	December 17	@ Philadelphia	W 97–92	Terry Mills (32)	Terry Mills (7)	Joe Dumars (7)	CoreStates Spectrum; 11,642	9–12
22	December 21	@ New Jersey	L 99–117	Terry Mills (25)	Eric Leckner (9)	Johnny Dawkins, Grant Hill (6)	Brendan Byrne Arena; 11,380	9–13
23	December 23	Atlanta	L 77–97	Allan Houston (23)	Oliver Miller (13)	Grant Hill, Joe Dumars (5)	The Palace of Auburn Hills; 21,454	9–14
24	December 27	Milwaukee	L 88–98	Terry Mills (23)	Terry Mills (11)	Grant Hill (8)	The Palace of Auburn Hills; 18,209	9–15
25	December 28	@ New York	L 93–101	Joe Dumars (24)	Grant Hill, Oliver Miller (7)	Joe Dumars (6)	Madison Square Garden; 19,763	9–16
26	December 30	Boston	L 107–124	Terry Mills (23)	Terry Mills, Eric Leckner (6)	Grant Hill (7)	The Palace of Auburn Hills; 19,178	9–17

January: 5–9 (home: 4–4; road: 1–5)

Game	Date	Team	Score	High points	High rebounds	High assists	Location Attendance	Record
27	January 3	@ L.A. Lakers	L 96–105	Terry Mills (24)	Terry Mills (8)	Johnny Dawkins (10)	Great Western Forum; 13,228	9–18
28	January 5	@ Sacramento	L 88–94	Joe Dumars (24)	Terry Mills (11)	Terry Mills (5)	ARCO Arena; 17,317	9–19
29	January 8	Orlando	L 88–108	Joe Dumars (19)	Rafael Addison (11)	Joe Dumars (11)	The Palace of Auburn Hills; 21,454	9–20
30	January 10	New Jersey	W 98–84	Joe Dumars (32)	Terry Mills (15)	Johnny Dawkins, Negele Knight (6)	The Palace of Auburn Hills; 14,256	10–20
31	January 11	@ Orlando	L 107–124	Joe Dumars (21)	Terry Mills, Allan Houston (7)	Negele Knight (8)	Orlando Arena; 16,010	10–21
32	January 13	@ Minnesota	L 92–104	Joe Dumars (32)	Terry Mills, Eric Leckner (8)	Joe Dumars (8)	Orlando Arena; 16,010	10–22
33	January 16	@ Philadelphia	W 116–110	Joe Dumars (35)	Terry Mills, Eric Leckner (7)	Johnny Dawkins (12)	CoreStates Spectrum; 10,768	11–22
34	January 18	Utah	L 86–99	Rafael Addison (23)	Terry Mills (13)	Allan Houston, Joe Dumars (7)	The Palace of Auburn Hills; 14,755	11–23
35	January 20	Houston	L 96–106	Terry Mills (33)	Terry Mills (9)	Joe Dumars (8)	The Palace of Auburn Hills; 21,454	11–24
36	January 21	@ Milwaukee	L 100–120	Joe Dumars (29)	Terry Mills (7)	Johnny Dawkins (9)	Bradley Center; 18,633	11–25
37	January 24	Philadelphia	W 116–105	Allan Houston (32)	Terry Mills, Rafael Addison (7)	Johnny Dawkins (10)	The Palace of Auburn Hills; 13,613	12–25
38	January 26	Portland	L 89–106	Mark West (15)	Terry Mills, Oliver Miller (7)	Negele Knight (10)	The Palace of Auburn Hills; 13,850	12–26
39	January 28	Miami	W 89–85	Grant Hill (14)	Oliver Miller (16)	Joe Dumars (7)	The Palace of Auburn Hills; 15,345	13–26
40	January 30	L.A. Clippers	W 102–95	Grant Hill (27)	Oliver Miller (9)	Joe Dumars (14)	The Palace of Auburn Hills; 12,657	14–26

February: 6–8 (home: 6–1; road: 0–7)

Game	Date	Team	Score	High points	High rebounds	High assists	Location Attendance	Record
41	February 1	@ Miami	L 75–98	Terry Mills (20)	Terry Mills (9)	Grant Hill (5)	Miami Arena; 14,304	14–27
42	February 2	Cleveland	W 85–83	Grant Hill (22)	Terry Mills (9)	Negele Knight (7)	The Palace of Auburn Hills; 13,286	15–27
43	February 4	Atlanta	W 84–78	Grant Hill (22)	Terry Mills (17)	Grant Hill (6)	The Palace of Auburn Hills; 21,454	16–27
44	February 6	@ New Jersey	L 97–101	Joe Dumars (27)	Mark West (8)	Grant Hill (5)	Brendan Byrne Arena; 11,054	16–28
45	February 7	Washington	W 119–115	Joe Dumars (43)	Terry Mills (11)	Terry Mills (7)	The Palace of Auburn Hills; 18,155	17–28
46	February 8	Washington	L 78–106	Rafael Addison (25)	Mark West (8)	Johnny Dawkins, Negele Knight (4)	The Palace of Auburn Hills; 15,784	17–29
All-Star Break
47	February 14	New York	W 106–94	Grant Hill (25)	Terry Mills (9)	Grant Hill (8)	The Palace of Auburn Hills; 15,513	18–29
48	February 15	@ Indiana	L 88–114	Joe Dumars (25)	Grant Hill (10)	Mark Macon (4)	Market Square Arena; 14,829	18–30
49	February 17	@ Chicago	L 102–117	Allan Houston (33)	Terry Mills (8)	Joe Dumars (6)	United Center; 22,214	18–31
50	February 18	@ Charlotte	L 88–110	Joe Dumars (15)	Bill Curley (10)	Johnny Dawkins (6)	Charlotte Coliseum; 23,698	18–32
51	February 20	Sacramento	W 99–93	Grant Hill (20)	Oliver Miller, Mark West (10)	Negele Knight (10)	The Palace of Auburn Hills; 15,148	19–32
52	February 23	@ Houston	L 99–110	Joe Dumars (28)	Oliver Miller (10)	Joe Dumars (8)	The Summit; 16,611	19–33
53	February 24	@ San Antonio	L 97–114	Joe Dumars (34)	Oliver Miller (10)	Grant Hill (11)	Alamodome; 20,443	19–34
54	February 27	Milwaukee	W 97–89	Rafael Addison (21)	Grant Hill, Oliver Miller (7)	Joe Dumars (10)	The Palace of Auburn Hills; 14,248	20–34

March: 5–11 (home: 3–5; road: 2–6)

Game	Date	Team	Score	High points	High rebounds	High assists	Location Attendance	Record
55	March 1	Indiana	W 92–79	Grant Hill (24)	Rafael Addison, Mark West (7)	Rafael Addison, Allan Houston (8)	The Palace of Auburn Hills; 15,066	21–34
56	March 3	@ Indiana	L 78–94	Terry Mills (27)	Oliver Miller (19)	Joe Dumars (4)	The Omni; 14,958	21–35
57	March 4	@ Dallas	W 98–91	Joe Dumars (19)	Oliver Miller (10)	Grant Hill (9)	Reunion Arena; 17,502	22–35
58	March 7	@ Cleveland	L 81–89	Terry Mills (26)	Terry Mills (10)	Joe Dumars (6)	Gund Arena; 20,562	22–36
59	March 8	@ Washington	W 114–105	Allan Houston (29)	Grant Hill (9)	Joe Dumars (8)	USAir Arena; 13,011	23–36
60	March 10	Denver	L 88–99	Allan Houston (36)	Rafael Addison (7)	Joe Dumars (8)	The Palace of Auburn Hills; 21,454	23–37
61	March 12	Seattle	L 94–134	Grant Hill (21)	Oliver Miller (12)	Grant Hill, Joe Dumars (5)	The Palace of Auburn Hills; 16,235	23–38
62	March 14	@ Phoenix	L 109–116	Allan Houston (35)	Terry Mills (8)	Negele Knight (9)	America West Arena; 19,023	23–39
63	March 15	@ L.A. Clippers	L 87–117	Grant Hill (28)	Mark West (10)	Grant Hill (4)	Los Angeles Memorial Sports Arena; 7,750	23–40
64	March 18	@ Seattle	L 110–133	Lindsey Hunter (24)	Oliver Miller (10)	Lindsey Hunter (6)	Tacoma Dome; 17,326	23–41
65	March 19	@ Golden State	L 115–117	Allan Houston (35)	Oliver Miller (13)	Joe Dumars (15)	Oakland-Alameda County Coliseum Arena; 15,025	23–42
66	March 21	New Jersey	W 102–95	Allan Houston (28)	Oliver Miller (12)	Grant Hill (8)	The Palace of Auburn Hills; 13,252	24–42
67	March 23	Dallas	L 94–102	Grant Hill (32)	Oliver Miller (11)	Lindsey Hunter (9)	The Palace of Auburn Hills; 15,861	24–43
68	March 25	Boston	W 104–103	Grant Hill (33)	Grant Hill (16)	Grant Hill (8)	The Palace of Auburn Hills; 21,454	25–43
69	March 27	San Antonio	L 93–114	Allan Houston (24)	Grant Hill, Oliver Miller (8)	Grant Hill (6)	The Palace of Auburn Hills; 16,084	25–44
70	March 29	New York	L 97–107	Allan Houston (32)	Grant Hill (12)	Grant Hill (9)	The Palace of Auburn Hills; 17,067	25–45

April: 3–9 (home: 3–2; road: 0–7)

Game	Date	Team	Score	High points	High rebounds	High assists	Location Attendance	Record
71	April 2	Washington	W 110–105	Grant Hill (33)	Mark West (16)	Grant Hill (5)	The Palace of Auburn Hills; 21,454	26–45
72	April 5	@ Orlando	L 125–128	Joe Dumars (41)	Grant Hill (11)	Grant Hill (8)	Orlando Arena; 16,010	26–46
73	April 7	Orlando	W 104–94	Allan Houston (25)	Oliver Miller (13)	Grant Hill (10)	The Palace of Auburn Hills; 21,454	27–46
74	April 8	@ New York	L 96–113	Allan Houston (28)	Mark West (8)	Terry Mills (6)	Madison Square Garden; 19,763	27–47
75	April 11	@ Milwaukee	L 109–114 (OT)	Allan Houston (36)	Terry Mills (13)	Terry Mills (7)	Bradley Center; 16,510	27–48
76	April 12	Chicago	L 113–124	Allan Houston (31)	Grant Hill (10)	Joe Dumars (13)	The Palace of Auburn Hills; 21,454	27–49
77	April 14	Charlotte	L 86–94	Allan Houston (21)	Grant Hill, Terry Mills, Mark West (11)	Grant Hill, Lindsey Hunter, Allan Houston (8)	The Palace of Auburn Hills; 21,454	27–50
78	April 15	@ Boston	L 104–129	Grant Hill (31)	Grant Hill (8)	Lindsey Hunter (9)	Hartford Civic Center; 12,979	27–51
79	April 18	Cleveland	W 85–76	Grant Hill (26)	Oliver Miller (13)	Grant Hill (6)	The Palace of Auburn Hills; 17,203	28–51
80	April 20	@ Chicago	L 105–120	Terry Mills (26)	Grant Hill (15)	Allan Houston, Lindsey Hunter (8)	United Center; 23,612	28–52
81	April 21	@ Atlanta	L 111–128	Grant Hill (33)	Mark West (10)	Lindsey Hunter (9)	The Omni; 14,502	28–53
82	April 23	@ Miami	L 105–129	Allan Houston (23)	Terry Mills (10)	Grant Hill, Lindsey Hunter (8)	Miami Arena; 14,876	28–54

1994–95 schedule

== Player statistics ==
Legend
GP	Games played	GS	Games started	MPG	Minutes per game
FG%	Field-goal percentage	3P%	3-point field-goal percentage	FT%	Free-throw percentage
RPG	Rebounds per game	APG	Assists per game	SPG	Steals per game
BPG	Blocks per game	PPG	Points per game

=== Regular season ===
Player	GP	GS	MPG	FG%	3P%	FT%	RPG	APG	SPG	BPG	PPG
Grant Hill	70	69	38.3	.477	.148	.732	6.4	5.0	1.8	0.9	19.9
Joe Dumars	67	67	38.0	.430	.305	.805	2.4	5.5	1.1	0.1	18.1
Terry Mills	72	69	34.9	.447	.382	.799	7.8	2.2	0.9	0.5	15.5
Allan Houston	76	39	26.3	.463	.424	.860	2.2	2.2	0.8	0.2	14.5
Oliver Miller	64	22	24.3	.555	.231	.629	7.4	1.5	0.9	1.8	8.5
Rafael Addison	79	16	22.5	.476	.289	.747	3.1	1.4	0.7	0.3	8.3
Mark West	67	58	23.0	.556		.478	6.1	0.3	0.4	1.5	7.5
Lindsey Hunter	42	26	22.5	.374	.333	.727	1.8	3.8	1.2	0.2	7.5
Johnny Dawkins	50	9	23.4	.463	.342	.909	2.3	4.1	1.0	0.0	6.5
Mark Macon	55	6	13.1	.381	.323	.794	1.4	1.1	1.2	0.0	5.0
Negele Knight	44	17	15.1	.392	.393	.667	1.3	2.6	0.5	0.1	4.1
Eric Leckner	57	11	10.9	.527	.000	.708	3.1	0.2	0.3	0.3	3.9
Bill Curley	53	1	11.2	.433		.750	2.3	0.5	0.4	0.4	2.7
Walter Bond	5	0	10.2	.250	.250	.750	1.0	1.4	0.2	0.0	2.0
Mike Peplowski	6	0	3.5	1.000		.500	0.5	0.2	0.2	0.0	1.8
Ivano Newbill	34	0	9.7	.356		.364	2.4	0.5	0.4	0.3	1.2

Player statistics citation:

== Awards and records ==
- Grant Hill, NBA Rookie of the Year Award
- Grant Hill, NBA All-Rookie Team 1st Team

== See also ==
- 1994-95 NBA season
