= Anthony Mason (basketball) =

American basketball player (1966–2015)

Personal information
- Born: December 14, 1966 Miami, Florida, U.S.
- Died: February 28, 2015 (aged 48) New York City, New York, U.S.
- Listed height: 6 ft 8 in (2.03 m)
- Listed weight: 255 lb (116 kg)

Career information
- High school: Springfield Gardens (Queens, New York)
- College: Tennessee State (1984–1988)
- NBA draft: 1988: 3rd round, 53rd overall pick
- Drafted by: Portland Trail Blazers
- Playing career: 1988–2003
- Position: Power forward / small forward
- Number: 42, 34, 14, 17

Career history
- 1988–1989: Efes Pilsen
- 1989–1990: New Jersey Nets
- 1990–1991: Tulsa Fast Breakers
- 1990–1991: Denver Nuggets
- 1991: Marinos de Oriente
- 1991: Long Island Surf
- 1991–1996: New York Knicks
- 1996–2000: Charlotte Hornets
- 2000–2001: Miami Heat
- 2001–2003: Milwaukee Bucks

Career highlights
- NBA All-Star (2001); All-NBA Third Team (1997); NBA All-Defensive Second Team (1997); NBA Sixth Man of the Year (1995)

Career NBA statistics
- Points: 9,656 (10.9 ppg)
- Rebounds: 7,279 (8.3 rpg)
- Assists: 2,963 (3.4 apg)
- Stats at NBA.com
- Stats at Basketball Reference

Anthony George Douglas Mason (December 14, 1966 – February 28, 2015) was an American professional basketball player. In his 15-year career, he played with the New Jersey Nets, Denver Nuggets, New York Knicks, Charlotte Hornets, Milwaukee Bucks, and Miami Heat of the National Basketball Association. He averaged 10.8 points and 8.3 rebounds in his 13-year NBA career. Mason earned the NBA Sixth Man of the Year Award in 1995 and led the NBA in minutes played in the following two seasons. In 1997, he was named to the All-NBA Third Team and the NBA All-Defensive Second Team. He was selected to the 2001 NBA All-Star Game. Mason was a member of the 1993–94 New York Knicks team that reached the NBA Finals.

Mason played collegiately for Tennessee State University and also played professionally in Turkey, Venezuela, the Continental Basketball Association (CBA), and the United States Basketball League (USBL).

== Pre-NBA career ==
=== Early years ===
Mason attended Tennessee State University and was drafted by the Portland Trail Blazers in the third round of the 1988 NBA draft (53rd pick), but was cut shortly afterwards. He then played for the Efes Pilsen basketball club in Turkey and Marinos de Oriente in Venezuela and had brief NBA stints with the New Jersey Nets and the Denver Nuggets.

In the 1990–1991 season, Mason played 26 games for the CBA's Tulsa Fast Breakers, with whom he averaged 29.9 points and 14.8 rebounds per game in his only season in the league.

Also in 1991, Mason played as a power forward for the Long Island Surf of the USBL. In his one season with the Surf, Mason was named to the All-USBL First Team, averaging 27.8 points and 11.2 rebounds per game, and he set a league record with 28 rebounds in a game. Ed Krinsky, general manager of the Surf, said, "I really believed he could play in the NBA. He was a huge guy with backcourt skills". Later that year, Mason was already on the New York Knicks' summer league roster, with Pat Riley as coach. In the year 2000, in celebration of the USBL's 15th anniversary, USBL fans voted on the "All-15 Team," a collection of the best USBL players from 1985 to 2000, many of whom went on to become renowned NBA stars, with Mason included among the 15.

== NBA career ==
=== New York Knicks ===
Mason signed with the New York Knicks in the summer of 1991. Under coach Pat Riley, Mason became part of a strong frontcourt alongside Patrick Ewing, Charles Oakley and Charles Smith. On March 26, 1993, Mason scored a then career high 30 points, along with grabbing 16 rebounds, in a 105–95 win against the Los Angeles Lakers. In 1994, the Knicks reached the NBA Finals for the first time since 1973, but lost in seven games to the Hakeem Olajuwon-led Houston Rockets.

Mason won the NBA Sixth Man of the Year Award in 1995. He led the league in minutes played in 1995–96 with 3,457, setting a Knicks team record. In 1996, Mason and Brad Lohaus were traded to the Charlotte Hornets for Larry Johnson.

=== Charlotte Hornets ===
In Mason's Charlotte debut, on November 2, 1996, he recorded a double-double with 18 points and 15 rebounds in a 109–98 victory over the Toronto Raptors. On February 17, 1997, Mason scored a season-high 28 points (on 11 of 11 shooting from the field), grabbed 12 rebounds, and recorded 9 assists in a 124–110 win against the Orlando Magic. In the 1996–1997 season, Mason recorded career high averages in minutes played (43.1), points (16.2), rebounds (11.4) and assists (5.7). He led the league in minutes. Despite a strong personal showing in the first round of the playoffs, averaging 13 points and 12 rebounds a game, Mason and the Hornets were eliminated by his former team, the Knicks, in a sweep. Following the season, he was named to the All-NBA Third Team and to the NBA All-Defensive Second Team.

During the 1997-98 NBA season, Mason took a slight step back with regards to averages, but was still a solid starter, and helped the Hornets advance past the first round of the NBA playoffs by averaging 19.8 points and 8.3 rebounds per game during a 3–1 series victory over their division rival Atlanta Hawks. The following round, the Hornets were eliminated by Michael Jordan and the Chicago Bulls.

Mason missed the entire 1998–99 season due to a ruptured bicep. The following year, Mason averaged 11.6 points and 8.5 rebounds in the 1999–2000 season. On March 31 of that season, Mason recorded a triple-double with a career-high 31 points, 14 rebounds, and 11 assists, in a 110–101 win against the Raptors. Again despite a strong personal season, Mason and the Hornets would be eliminated in the first round of the playoffs, this time by the Philadelphia 76ers.

=== Miami Heat ===
In 2000, Mason was traded to the Miami Heat along with Eddie Jones, Ricky Davis and Dale Ellis for Jamal Mashburn, P. J. Brown, Tim James, Rodney Buford and Otis Thorpe. In Miami, although Mason had been brought over by Miami coach Pat Riley to be a role player on what was thought to have been a contender Heat team, the kidney ailment of Alonzo Mourning forced Mourning to sit out and made Mason a starter for the team. Mason would respond by finishing second on the team in scoring, with 16.1 points per game, and averaging 9.6 rebounds. With Mourning and Grant Hill selected but unable to play due to injury in the 2001 NBA All-Star Game, Mason was chosen to represent the Heat in his only selection to an All-Star team. Mason helped the Heat make the playoffs with a 50 win season for the injury-ravaged squad. Mason, however, virtually disappeared in the playoffs, taking only 13 shots and averaging a mere 5.3 points and 3 rebounds in three games. Mason was waived during the offseason.

=== Milwaukee Bucks ===
Mason signed with the Milwaukee Bucks for the 2001–02 season. In Mason's first season with the Bucks, the team stumbled to a 41–41 record (11 games worse than the previous season) and missed the playoffs altogether. Mason's numbers went down as well: 9.6 ppg, 7.9 rpg. Nonetheless, Milwaukee stuck with Mason for another year, waiving him after the 2002–03 season. Mason retired from the NBA in 2003.

== Media appearances ==
In the TV series New York Undercover, Mason appeared in two different episodes, playing himself in one. He also plays a pickup player in the 1996 film Eddie, and himself in Woody Allen's Celebrity.

In addition, Mason appears in the Diamond D hip hop video "Best-Kept Secret," dunking his way through the video on a New York City playground basketball court.

The Beastie Boys song "B-Boys Makin' with the Freak Freak" from 1994's Ill Communication album mentions him with the lyric "I got my hair cut correct like Anthony Mason".

The Notorious B.I.G. song "I Got a Story to Tell" tells of the supposed event of the rapper sleeping with the girlfriend of a New York Knick in the player's home, and the fall-out that came with the player returning home while the story teller was still present. The identity of the involved player has been contested since the song's release, with many long suspecting the Knick in question to have been John Starks, Mason's teammate of several years. The player in question was alleged, decades later, to be Mason, by rapper Fat Joe.

== Personal life ==
Mason was born in Miami, Florida, and spent most of his childhood in New York City in the borough of Queens.

After being charged with statutory rape in 1998, Mason pleaded guilty to two counts of endangering the welfare of a child.

Mason's son, Anthony Mason Jr., played on the St. John's University Red Storm basketball team. He completed his eligibility for the 2009–10 St. John's Red Storm, and he went on to try out with the Miami Heat, before playing for teams such as the Sioux Falls Skyforce and Cholet Basket. Another son, Antoine, played basketball at Auburn University after transferring there from Niagara University, where he led the 2012–13 Niagara Purple Eagles in scoring as a redshirt sophomore.

=== Death ===
Mason had a heart attack in early February 2015 and was diagnosed with congestive heart failure. He died on February 28, 2015, in New York City at the age of 48.

== NBA career statistics ==
Legend
GP	Games played	GS	Games started	MPG	Minutes per game
FG%	Field goal percentage	3P%	3-point field goal percentage	FT%	Free throw percentage
RPG	Rebounds per game	APG	Assists per game	SPG	Steals per game
BPG	Blocks per game	PPG	Points per game	**Bold**	Career high
*	Led the league

=== Regular season ===
Year	Team	GP	GS	MPG	FG%	3P%	FT%	RPG	APG	SPG	BPG	PPG
1989–90	New Jersey	21	0	5.1	.350	—	.600	1.6	.3	.1	.1	1.8
1990–91	Denver	3	0	7.0	.500	—	.750	1.7	.0	.3	.0	3.3
1991–92	New York	**82**	0	26.8	.509	—	.642	7.0	1.3	.6	.3	7.0
1992–93	New York	81	0	30.6	.502	—	.682	7.9	2.1	.5	.2	10.3
1993–94	New York	73	12	26.1	.476	.000	.720	5.8	2.1	.4	.1	7.2
1994–95	New York	77	11	32.4	**.566**	.000	.641	8.4	3.1	.9	.3	9.9
1995–96	New York	**82**	**82***	42.2	.563	—	.720	9.3	4.4	.8	.4	14.6
1996–97	Charlotte	73	73	**43.1**	.525	.333	.745	**11.4**	**5.7**	**1.0**	**.5**	**16.2**
1997–98	Charlotte	81	80	38.9	.509	.000	.649	10.2	4.2	.8	.2	12.8
1999–00	Charlotte	**82**	81	38.2	.480	.000	.746	8.5	4.5	.9	.4	11.6
2000–01	Miami	80	80	40.7	.482	—	**.781**	9.6	3.1	**1.0**	.3	16.1
2001–02	Milwaukee	**82**	**82**	38.3	.505	**1.000**	.697	7.9	4.2	.7	.3	9.6
2002–03	Milwaukee	65	58	32.6	.486	.000	.718	6.4	3.2	.5	.2	7.2
Career		882	559	34.7	.509	.167	.709	8.3	3.4	.7	.3	10.9
All-Star		1	0	20.0	.000	.000	.000	4.0	1.0	1.0	.0	.0

=== Playoffs ===
Year	Team	GP	GS	MPG	FG%	3P%	FT%	RPG	APG	SPG	BPG	PPG
1992	New York	12	0	24.0	.442	—	.786	6.3	.8	.2	**.7**	5.0
1993	New York	15	0	34.0	.590	—	.632	7.3	2.7	.7	.4	12.5
1994	New York	**25**	0	26.4	.489	—	.714	5.8	1.8	.6	.2	7.6
1995	New York	11	0	32.0	**.608**	.000	.623	6.2	2.2	.5	.5	9.5
1996	New York	8	8	43.8	.526	—	.679	7.8	3.3	.5	.1	12.6
1997	Charlotte	3	3	43.7	.421	—	.538	**12.0**	3.0	.3	.3	13.0
1998	Charlotte	9	**9**	40.8	.576	.000	.595	7.9	3.4	.9	.0	**15.4**
2000	Charlotte	4	4	**44.8**	.474	.000	.700	9.8	**5.5**	**1.0**	.5	12.5
2001	Miami	3	3	32.7	.385	.000	**1.000**	3.0	1.3	.3	.0	5.3
2003	Milwaukee	6	0	26.2	.412	—	.692	3.3	.2	.5	.2	3.8
Career		96	27	32.2	.524	.000	.668	6.6	2.2	.6	.3	9.5

== See also ==
- List of National Basketball Association annual minutes leaders
