= Derek Harper =

American basketball player (born 1961)

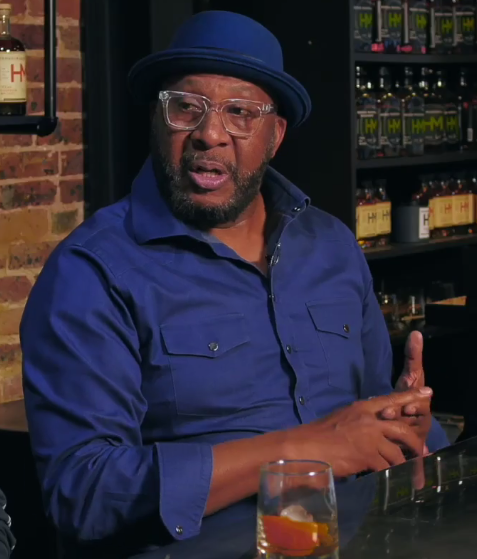
- Harper in 2023

Personal information
- Born: October 13, 1961 (age 65) Elberton, Georgia, U.S.
- Listed height: 6 ft 4 in (1.93 m)
- Listed weight: 206 lb (93 kg)

Career information
- High school: North Shore (West Palm Beach, Florida)
- College: Illinois (1980–1983)
- NBA draft: 1983: 1st round, 11th overall pick
- Drafted by: Dallas Mavericks
- Playing career: 1983–1999
- Position: Point guard
- Number: 12, 11

Career history
- 1983–1994: Dallas Mavericks
- 1994–1996: New York Knicks
- 1996–1997: Dallas Mavericks
- 1997–1998: Orlando Magic
- 1999: Los Angeles Lakers

Career highlights
- 2× NBA All-Defensive Second Team (1987, 1990); No. 12 retired by Dallas Mavericks; Second-team All-American – AP (1983); First-team Parade All-American (1980); McDonald's All-American (1980)

Career NBA statistics
- Points: 16,006 (13.3 ppg)
- Rebounds: 2,884 (2.4 rpg)
- Assists: 6,577 (5.5 apg)
- Stats at NBA.com
- Stats at Basketball Reference

Derek Ricardo Harper (born October 13, 1961) is an American former professional basketball player. A second-team All-American at the University of Illinois, he was the 11th overall pick of the 1983 NBA draft and spent 16 seasons as a point guard in the National Basketball Association with the Dallas Mavericks, New York Knicks, Orlando Magic, and Los Angeles Lakers. Harper is widely regarded as one of the best players to never have been selected to an All-Star game.

== College ==
After graduating from Roosevelt Junior High School and then North Shore High School in West Palm Beach, Harper played three seasons for the Fighting Illini and coach Lou Henson having his best season in 1982–1983, when he led the Fighting Illini in scoring with 15.4 points per game. Harper was named First-Team All-Big Ten and Second-Team All-American in 1983, and was Honorable Mention All-Big Ten in both 1981 and 1982. Harper averaged 4.7 assists per game for his collegiate career, and led the Big Ten in assists in the 1981–1982 season. Harper was elected to the "Illini Men's Basketball All-Century Team" in 2004.

== Professional career ==
=== Dallas Mavericks (1983–1993) ===
At 6 ft 4 in, Harper was drafted by the Dallas Mavericks with the 11th overall pick of the 1983 NBA draft. He spent his first ten seasons with them, averaging 15 points and 6.1 assists. For almost the entire time in his first stint with the team, he was part of the starting backcourt tandem with All-Star shooting guard Rolando Blackman. The Mavericks made the playoffs 6 out of the 10 years of Harper's tenure with the team, and they made it to the Western Conference Finals in the 1987–1988 season, but they were never able to replicate that success for any other season of Harper's time in Dallas. He had multiple seasons of averaging well over 10 PPG, and became known for being both a great scorer and defender. His best season came in 1990–1991 where he averaged 19.7 PPG. But he still wasn't selected to be an all star and the Mavericks finished that year with an unpleasant 28–54 record. Harper still played well for the rest of his time in Dallas, but the team was atrocious. In the 1992–1993 season especially, the Mavericks finished 11–71 which is one of the worst records of all time. Harper spent 2 more seasons with the Mavericks before leaving the team during the 1993–1994 season.

Harper, JJ Redick, and DeAndre Jordan are currently the only players in NBA history to increase their season scoring average for eight consecutive seasons. Harper did it with the Mavericks from 1983–84 to 1990–91.

=== New York Knicks (1993–1996) ===
Harper was traded to the New York Knicks (where he was reunited with Blackman) 28 games into the 1993–94 season. The Knicks were looking for a defensive point guard to replace the injured Doc Rivers, who was sidelined for the rest of the season. The shift sent him from a team that finished 13–69 to being an integral part of one that came within one game of winning the 1994 NBA Championship. His stats declined as he had to adjust to having less of an individual role, but his best season with the Knicks came in his last year with the team where he averaged 14.0 PPG. On July 14, 1996, he was released by the Knicks and became a free agent.

=== Return to Dallas (1996–1997) ===
Harper returned to Dallas after signing with the Mavericks on July 26. In his return he averaged 10.0 PPG and 4.3 APG. He played well at the age of 35 but the Mavericks were still a bad team, finishing the season with only 24 wins. This would be the final season that he would play for the Mavericks.

=== Orlando Magic (1997–1998) ===
Harper was traded by the Mavericks with Ed O'Bannon to the Orlando Magic for Dennis Scott and cash. He played one season for the Magic, his scoring and overall play dropped off but he was still a solid bench player. The Magic had a decent roster but the team was very old. 16 out of the 22 players on the roster were either 30 years old or older, Harper was one of those 16 players (he was 36 at the time). The team had an average record of 41–41 and missed the playoffs. Harper's contract expired in the 1998 offseason and he left the team.

=== Los Angeles Lakers (1999) ===
Harper signed as a free agent with the Los Angeles Lakers. The Lakers were a great team and had a young Shaquille O'Neal and Kobe Bryant leading the way. They made the playoffs and it was the first time Harper had reached the playoffs since 1996 with the Knicks. The Lakers made it to the second round but got swept by the San Antonio Spurs. This would be the final year of Harper's career.

=== Retirement ===
In the 1999 offseason, the Lakers traded Harper to the Detroit Pistons, but he didn't report to the team. He retired from the NBA shortly after.

On December 18, 2017, the Mavericks announced that they were planning to retire Harper's no. 12 jersey, which was eventually retired on January 7, 2018.

== Personal life ==
Harper lives in Dallas with his family. His daughter Dana Harper was a contestant on season 11 of The Voice. He is now a game analyst for the Dallas Mavericks on their locally broadcast games. Beginning in fall 2005, he was the weekend sports anchor at KTXA serving the Dallas-Fort Worth Metroplex until the station ended its newscasts. The Dallas Mavericks retired Harper's #12 jersey during halftime of a game between the New York Knicks and Dallas Mavericks on Sunday, January 7, 2018.

== Honors ==
=== Basketball ===
- 1981 – Honorable Mention All-Big Ten
- 1982 – Honorable Mention All-Big Ten
- 1983 – Team Captain
- 1983 – Team MVP
- 1983 – 1st Team All-Big Ten
- 1983 – 2nd Team All-American
- 2004 – Elected to the "Illini Men's Basketball All-Century Team".
- 2008 – Honored jersey which hangs in the State Farm Center to show regard for being the most decorated basketball players in the University of Illinois' history.
- 2018 – Dallas Mavericks #12 jersey retired

== College statistics ==
Season	Games	Points	PPG	Field Goals	Attempts	Avg	Free Throws	Attempts	Avg	Rebounds	Avg	Assists	APG
1980–81	29	241	8.3	104	252	.413	33	46	.717	75	2.6	156	5.4
1981–82	29	244	8.4	105	230	.457	34	45	.756	133	4.6	145	5.0
1982–83	32	492	15.4	198	369	.537	83	123	.675	112	3.5	118	3.7
Totals	90	977	10.9	407	851	.478	150	214	.701	320	3.6	419	4.7

== NBA career statistics ==
Harper played in 1,199 regular season games in his career, tying him for 35th in NBA history (as of the 2013–14 NBA season). He retired having the 11th-most steals and the 17th-most assists in NBA history. He is also the Mavericks' career leader in those categories.

Legend
GP	Games played	GS	Games started	MPG	Minutes per game
FG%	Field goal percentage	3P%	3-point field goal percentage	FT%	Free throw percentage
RPG	Rebounds per game	APG	Assists per game	SPG	Steals per game
BPG	Blocks per game	PPG	Points per game	**Bold**	Career high

=== Regular season ===
Year	Team	GP	GS	MPG	FG%	3P%	FT%	RPG	APG	SPG	BPG	PPG
1983–84	Dallas	**82**	1	20.9	.443	.115	.673	2.1	2.9	1.2	.3	5.7
1984–85	Dallas	**82**	1	27.0	.520	.344	.721	2.4	4.4	1.8	**.5**	9.6
1985–86	Dallas	79	39	27.2	**.534**	.235	.747	2.9	5.3	1.9	.3	12.2
1986–87	Dallas	77	76	33.2	.501	.358	.684	2.6	**7.9**	2.2	.3	16.0
1987–88	Dallas	**82**	**82**	37.0	.459	.313	.759	**3.0**	7.7	2.0	.4	17.0
1988–89	Dallas	81	81	36.6	.477	.356	.806	2.8	7.0	2.1	**.5**	17.3
1989–90	Dallas	**82**	**82**	36.7	.488	.371	.794	**3.0**	7.4	**2.3**	.3	18.0
1990–91	Dallas	77	77	**37.4**	.467	.362	.731	**3.0**	7.1	1.9	.2	**19.7**
1991–92	Dallas	65	64	34.6	.443	.312	.759	2.6	5.7	1.6	.3	17.7
1992–93	Dallas	62	60	34.0	.419	**.393**	.756	2.0	5.4	1.3	.3	18.2
1993–94	Dallas	28	28	31.9	.380	.352	.560	2.0	3.5	1.6	.1	11.6
1993–94	New York	54	27	24.3	.430	.367	.743	1.6	4.4	1.5	.1	8.6
1994–95	New York	80	80	34.0	.446	.363	.724	2.4	5.7	1.0	.1	11.5
1995–96	New York	**82**	**82***	35.3	.464	.372	.757	2.5	4.3	1.6	.1	14.0
1996–97	Dallas	75	29	29.5	.444	.341	.742	1.8	4.3	1.2	.2	10.0
1997–98	Orlando	66	45	26.7	.417	.360	.696	1.6	3.5	1.1	.2	8.6
1998–99	L. A. Lakers	45	29	24.9	.412	.368	**.813**	1.5	4.2	1.0	.1	6.9
Career		1,199	883	31.5	.463	.354	.745	2.4	5.5	1.6	.3	13.3

=== Playoffs ===
Year	Team	GP	GS	MPG	FG%	3P%	FT%	RPG	APG	SPG	BPG	PPG
1984	Dallas	10	–	22.6	.389	.375	.714	2.0	2.8	1.1	.2	5.0
1985	Dallas	4	0	33.0	.476	.333	.714	3.0	5.0	1.5	**.3**	6.5
1986	Dallas	10	10	34.8	**.533**	.571	.750	1.9	7.6	**2.3**	.0	13.4
1987	Dallas	4	4	30.8	.500	.222	**.800**	3.0	6.8	1.8	.0	16.5
1988	Dallas	17	17	35.4	.441	.250	.729	2.5	7.1	1.9	**.3**	13.5
1990	Dallas	3	3	**39.7**	.438	.313	.688	2.7	**7.7**	1.3	.0	**19.3**
1994	New York	**23**	**22**	32.6	.429	.341	.643	2.3	4.5	1.8	.0	11.4
1995	New York	11	11	35.3	.514	**.574**	.750	**3.5**	5.6	1.0	.1	14.3
1996	New York	8	8	36.6	.354	.314	.733	2.1	4.8	1.3	.1	10.0
1999	L. A. Lakers	7	0	16.1	.419	.100	.500	1.4	2.1	.3	.0	4.3
Career		97	75	31.9	.449	.365	.712	2.4	5.3	1.5	.1	11.3

== See also ==
- List of National Basketball Association career games played leaders
- List of National Basketball Association career assists leaders
- List of National Basketball Association career steals leaders
