= Will Perdue =

American former basketball player (born 1965)

Personal information
- Born: August 29, 1965 (age 61) Melbourne, Florida, U.S.
- Listed height: 7 ft 0 in (2.13 m)
- Listed weight: 240 lb (109 kg)

Career information
- High school: Merritt Island (Merritt Island, Florida)
- College: Vanderbilt (1983–1988)
- NBA draft: 1988: 1st round, 11th overall pick
- Drafted by: Chicago Bulls
- Playing career: 1988–2001
- Position: Center
- Number: 32, 41, 55

Career history
- 1988–1995: Chicago Bulls
- 1995–1999: San Antonio Spurs
- 1999–2000: Chicago Bulls
- 2000–2001: Portland Trail Blazers

Career highlights
- 4× NBA champion (1991–1993, 1999); Third-team All-American – AP, NABC (1988); SEC Player of the Year (1988); First-team All-SEC (1988); SEC Athlete of the Year (1988)

Career NBA statistics
- Points: 3,740 (4.7 ppg)
- Rebounds: 3,918 (4.9 rpg)
- Blocks: 527 (0.7 bpg)
- Stats at NBA.com
- Stats at Basketball Reference

William Edward Perdue III (born August 29, 1965) is an American former professional basketball player in the National Basketball Association (NBA). He was a member of four NBA championship teams, three with the Chicago Bulls (1991–1993) and one with the San Antonio Spurs (1999). Perdue was a Studio analyst for NBC Sports Chicago during its pre- and post-game Chicago Bulls broadcasts until the channel's closure in 2024.

== Youth and college ==
Perdue attended Merritt Island High School in Merritt Island, Florida He played college basketball for the Vanderbilt Commodores, where he was named a third-team All-American, the Southeastern Conference Player of the Year and SEC Male Athlete of the Year in 1988.

== NBA career ==
Perdue was selected by the Chicago Bulls with the 11th overall pick in the 1988 NBA draft. The Bulls won three championships from 1991 to 1993 during Perdue's career. Perdue was mainly a backup to center Bill Cartwright. He became a regular starter during the 1994–95 NBA season, during which he averaged 8.0 points and 6.7 rebounds per game.

The emergence of Luc Longley made Perdue expendable, and before the next season's training camp, the Bulls traded him to the San Antonio Spurs for Dennis Rodman. The Spurs won the NBA championship in 1999, Perdue's fourth.

In August 1999, Perdue rejoined the Bulls as a free agent. He started 15 of 67 games in 1999–2000, averaging 2.5 points and 3.9 rebounds. After the 1999–2000 season, Perdue left Chicago and signed with the Portland Trail Blazers, where he averaged 1.3 points, 1.4 rebounds and 4.5 minutes in 13 games. He averaged 4.7 points and 4.9 rebounds per game over a thirteen-year career.

== Career statistics ==
Legend
GP	Games played	GS	Games started	MPG	Minutes per game
FG%	Field goal percentage	3P%	3-point field goal percentage	FT%	Free throw percentage
RPG	Rebounds per game	APG	Assists per game	SPG	Steals per game
BPG	Blocks per game	PPG	Points per game	**Bold**	Career high
†	Won an NBA championship

=== NBA ===
==== Regular season ====
Year	Team	GP	GS	MPG	FG%	3P%	FT%	RPG	APG	SPG	BPG	PPG
1988–89	Chicago	30	0	6.3	.403	–	.571	1.5	.4	.1	.2	2.2
1989–90	Chicago	77	11	11.5	.414	.000	.692	2.8	.6	.2	.3	3.8
1990–91†	Chicago	74	3	13.1	.494	.000	.670	4.5	.6	.3	.8	4.1
1991–92†	Chicago	77	7	13.1	.547	**.500**	.495	4.1	1.0	.2	.6	4.5
1992–93†	Chicago	72	16	13.9	.557	.000	.604	4.0	1.0	.3	.7	4.7
1993–94	Chicago	43	6	9.2	.420	.000	**.719**	2.9	.8	.2	.3	2.7
1994–95	Chicago	78	**78**	20.4	.553	.000	.582	6.7	**1.2**	.3	.7	8.0
1995–96	San Antonio	**80**	22	17.5	.523	.000	.536	6.1	.4	.4	.9	5.2
1996–97	San Antonio	65	34	**29.5**	.568	–	.579	**9.8**	.6	**.5**	**1.6**	**8.7**
1997–98	San Antonio	79	30	18.9	.549	.000	.526	6.8	.7	.3	.6	5.0
1998–99†	San Antonio	37	1	12.0	.633	–	.538	3.7	.5	.2	.3	2.4
1999–00	Chicago	67	15	15.1	.351	–	.476	3.9	1.0	.2	.6	2.5
2000–01	Portland	13	0	4.5	**.667**	–	.500	1.4	.2	.2	.2	1.1
Career		792	223	15.6	.515	.067	.577	4.9	.8	.3	.7	4.7

==== Playoffs ====
Year	Team	GP	GS	MPG	FG%	3P%	FT%	RPG	APG	SPG	BPG	PPG
1989	Chicago	3	0	7.3	.667	.000	.667	2.0	**.7**	.0	.0	4.7
1990	Chicago	13	0	6.0	.464	**.500**	.722	1.5	.2	.0	.4	3.1
1991†	Chicago	17	0	11.6	.547	–	.545	3.8	.2	.1	.5	4.1
1992†	Chicago	**18**	0	8.7	.486	.000	.450	2.2	.5	.2	.6	2.5
1993†	Chicago	13	0	7.8	.500	–	.500	2.3	.4	.1	.2	2.9
1995	Chicago	10	2	17.6	.514	–	.571	4.8	.6	.1	.3	5.0
1996	San Antonio	10	2	**24.2**	**.690**	–	.800	**7.9**	.5	.2	.4	**7.4**
1998	San Antonio	9	**7**	21.2	.333	–	**.857**	6.7	.1	**.7**	**1.0**	4.0
1999†	San Antonio	12	0	7.2	.545	–	.500	2.3	.0	.0	.1	1.1
2001	Portland	3	0	1.7	–	–	–	.7	.0	.0	.0	.0
Career		108	11	11.6	.527	.250	.633	3.5	.3	.1	.4	3.4
