= John Starks =

American basketball player (born 1965)

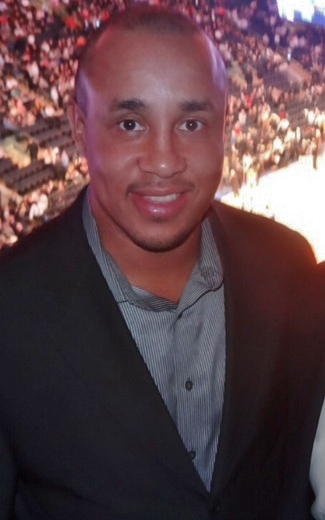
- Starks at Madison Square Garden in 2013

New York Knicks
- Title: Alumni Relations and Fan Development Advisor
- League: NBA

Personal information
- Born: August 10, 1965 (age 61) Tulsa, Oklahoma, U.S.
- Listed height: 6 ft 5 in (1.96 m)
- Listed weight: 190 lb (86 kg)

Career information
- High school: Central (Tulsa, Oklahoma)
- College: Northern Oklahoma (1985); Oklahoma JC (1986–1987); Oklahoma State (1987–1988)
- NBA draft: 1988: undrafted
- Playing career: 1988–2002
- Position: Shooting guard
- Number: 30, 3, 9
- Coaching career: 2003–2003

Career history

Playing
- 1988–1989: Golden State Warriors
- 1989–1990: Cedar Rapids Silver Bullets
- 1990: Memphis Rockers
- 1990–1998: New York Knicks
- 1999–2000: Golden State Warriors
- 2000: Chicago Bulls
- 2000–2002: Utah Jazz

Coaching
- 2003: Westchester Wildfire

Career highlights
- NBA All-Star (1994); NBA All-Defensive Second Team (1993); NBA Sixth Man of the Year (1997); CBA All-Star (1990); Alumni Relations and Fan Development Advisor: NBA champion (2026); NBA Cup champion (2025)

Career NBA statistics
- Points: 10,829 (12.5 ppg)
- Rebounds: 2,129 (2.5 rpg)
- Assists: 3,085 (3.6 apg)
- Stats at NBA.com
- Stats at Basketball Reference

John Levell Starks (born August 10, 1965) is an American former professional basketball player who was a shooting guard in the National Basketball Association (NBA). He was undrafted in the 1988 NBA draft after attending four colleges in his native Oklahoma, including Oklahoma State University. Starks was named an NBA All-Star while playing for the New York Knicks in the 1990s.

== Early life ==
Starks was born in Tulsa, Oklahoma where he attended Tulsa Central High School. At Tulsa Central, Starks played only one year on the basketball team.

After high school, he enrolled at Rogers State College in 1984. While at Rogers State, Starks was on the "taxi squad" of the basketball team for backups to replace injured or suspended players; taxi squad players did not suit up and instead watched games from the stands. However, Starks was expelled from Rogers State for stealing another student's stereo equipment in retaliation for the student breaking into Starks' dorm room and the college holding him and his roommates financially responsible for the damage. Starks transferred to Northern Oklahoma College in spring 1985, made the basketball team there, and was sentenced to five days in jail for the robbery. He served the sentence during spring break. In the fall of 1985, Starks averaged 11 points per game with Northern Oklahoma but left the college after being caught smoking cannabis in his dorm. Having worked at a Safeway supermarket, Starks enrolled at Tulsa Junior College in the summer of 1986 to pursue a business degree. While playing intramural basketball, he came to the attention of Ken Trickey, the former coach of Oral Roberts University who was then starting a basketball program for Oklahoma Junior College. Starks played there for a season, then earned a scholarship at Oklahoma State University in 1988, where he finished his collegiate career.

== Career ==
=== Golden State Warriors ===
Undrafted in the 1988 NBA draft, Starks signed with the Golden State Warriors in September 1988 as a free agent. Because the Warriors had drafted fellow shooting guard Mitch Richmond with the fifth overall pick that year, Starks played limited minutes in only 36 games while Richmond won Rookie of the Year.

=== Other leagues ===
Starks played stints in the Continental Basketball Association (Cedar Rapids Silver Bullets, 1989–90) and World Basketball League (Memphis Rockers, 1990–91).

=== New York Knicks ===
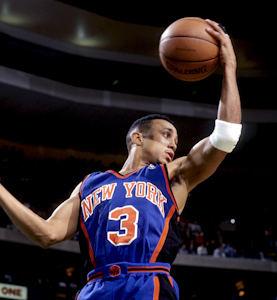
Starks with the New York Knicks in 1996

In 1990, Starks tried out for the New York Knicks. In one practice, he tried to dunk on Knicks center Patrick Ewing. Ewing threw him down and Starks twisted his knee. The team was not allowed to release him unless it healed by the end of December. When it did not heal by that time, the Knicks could not release him. As a result, Starks has referred to Ewing as his saving grace. Starks eventually became the starting shooting guard, becoming a key player on the team and playing eight seasons in New York, from 1990 to 1998. Starks was a poster child for their physical play during that era, along with teammates Anthony Mason and Charles Oakley. He was a participant in the 1992 NBA Slam Dunk Contest.

Starks executed a famous play that became known simply as "The Dunk." In Game 2 of the 1993 Eastern Conference Finals against the Chicago Bulls, Starks was in the court's right corner, and closely guarded by B. J. Armstrong. Ewing came to set a screen for Starks, who faked to the left, as if to exploit the screen, but then drove along the baseline and, with his left hand, dunked over Horace Grant and Michael Jordan.

One of the low points of Starks' career came in the 1994 NBA Finals against the Houston Rockets. In the closing seconds of Game 3 and the Knicks trailing by three, Starks was fouled by Rockets center Hakeem Olajuwon while attempting a three-pointer. At the time, the NBA allowed only two free throws during a foul on a three-pointer. Starks made both, but Houston won 93–89 (the league would change the rule to allow three free throws the next season). Starks and the Knicks then watched their home court host the New York Rangers' first Stanley Cup celebration in 54 years, with their 3–2 win over the Vancouver Canucks in Game 7 of the 1994 Stanley Cup Final. It served as an inspiration for the Knicks to recover to take a 3–2 series lead going into Game 6. However, in the final seconds of Game 6, Olajuwon blocked Starks' last-second three-point attempt to give Houston an 86–84 victory. In Game 7, Starks had one of the worst games of his career, shooting 2-for-18 from the field, including 1-for-10 in the fourth quarter. The Rockets won the game and thus the championship.

In 1995, Starks became the first player to hit 200 three-pointers in a single season. In the offseason, Pat Riley left the Knicks to go to the Miami Heat after a dispute with then General Manager Dave Checketts. The Knicks hired Don Nelson, bringing back the tensions from Starks' first season in Golden State. Nelson started Hubert Davis over Starks. Nelson was eventually fired mid-season, and the Knicks replaced him with Jeff Van Gundy. In 1996-97, newly acquired shooting guard Allan Houston took over Starks' starting spot. Despite this change, Starks was a steady contributor off the bench and won the NBA Sixth Man of the Year award in 1997.

On February 18, 1997, Starks hit a buzzer-beating three-pointer to defeat the Phoenix Suns at home, 95–94. On the play, he rebounded an Allan Houston missed three while getting to the three-point line and head-faked the Suns' Wesley Person before releasing the shot just as the horn sounded. Replays were inconclusive as to whether the shot was released in time, but the basket stood. This may have been the most dramatic regular season moment of Starks' career, as it was his only buzzer beater to win an NBA game.

=== Return to Golden State ===
In January 1999, Starks was traded back to his original team, the Golden State Warriors, along with Chris Mills and Terry Cummings, in exchange for Latrell Sprewell. Starks remained with the Warriors until February 2000, when he was traded to the Chicago Bulls as part of a three-team trade that sent Billy Owens and Larry Hughes to the Warriors.

=== Chicago Bulls ===
Starks played for the Chicago Bulls for four games in the 1999–2000 season. When the Bulls were unable to trade him before the February trade deadline, both sides contacted the league and inquired whether Starks could be released without pay so he could join a contender. The matter went to arbitrator who ruled that Starks could be released without pay, but would not be eligible for the playoffs with another team. With the ruling, Starks rescinded his request to be released but the Bulls released him anyway, citing their desire to focus on the younger core of the team.

=== Utah Jazz ===
Starks finished his career with the Utah Jazz, playing for the franchise from 2000 to 2002.

== Later career and retirement ==
After his stint with Golden State, Starks played for the Chicago Bulls and Utah Jazz before failing to make an NBA team in 2002 and retiring with 10,829 career points. He currently works for the Knicks as an alumnus and fan development official, and as a pre-and-post-game analyst on MSG Network's home Knicks game coverage. He has also served as the head coach of the Maulers, a Slamball team. He was head coach of the Westchester Wildfire during the 2003 United States Basketball League season. His autobiography, John Starks: My Life, was published in 2004.

Starks is part-owner and a promoter for the Ektio basketball shoe, which doctor and former college basketball player Barry Katz designed to reduce ankle injuries. Starks owns a Kia dealership, John Starks Kia, in the Briarwood neighborhood of Jamaica, New York. Starks recorded Public Service announcements on the MTA New York City Transit Authority's subway system in January 2026.

=== Slamball coaching record ===
Team	Year	Regular season				Postseason		
Team	Year	Won	Lost	Win %	Finish	Won	Lost	Result
Maulers	2008	5	7	.417	5th	–	–	Did not qualify
Total		5	7	.417	-	-	-	-

== Legacy ==
His tenacity, desire to win, and plays like "The Dunk,” made Starks into a crowd favorite in New York. and he is considered one of the greatest Knicks. Starks is the Knicks' all-time leader in three point field goals (982). He was the first player in NBA history to make 200 three-pointers in one season; his 217 during the 1994–95 NBA season broke Louie Dampier's single-season professional (NBA or ABA) record of 199 during the 1968–69 ABA season. Dennis Scott broke Starks' record a year later with 267; it now belongs to Stephen Curry. Starks was named to the NBA All-Defensive Second Team once, in 1992–93. Starks is mentioned by surname in A Tribe Called Quest's song "8 Million Stories" on Midnight Marauders and in Beastie Boys' "Get It Together" off Ill Communication.

== Personal life ==
Starks' mother was one-quarter Muscogee, making him one-eighth Muscogee. On December 13, 1986, Starks married his wife Jackie. They have one son and two daughters.

== NBA career statistics ==
Legend
GP	Games played	GS	Games started	MPG	Minutes per game
FG%	Field goal percentage	3P%	3-point field goal percentage	FT%	Free throw percentage
RPG	Rebounds per game	APG	Assists per game	SPG	Steals per game
BPG	Blocks per game	PPG	Points per game	**Bold**	Career high
*	Led the league

=== Regular season ===
Year	Team	GP	GS	MPG	FG%	3P%	FT%	RPG	APG	SPG	BPG	PPG
1988–89	Golden State	36	0	8.8	.408	.385	.654	1.1	.8	.6	.1	4.1
1990–91	New York	61	10	19.2	.439	.290	.752	2.1	3.3	1.0	**.3**	7.6
1991–92	New York	**82**	0	25.8	**.449**	.348	.778	2.3	3.4	1.3	.2	13.9
1992–93	New York	80	51	31.0	.428	.321	.795	2.6	5.1	1.1	.2	17.5
1993–94	New York	59	54	**34.9**	.420	.335	.754	3.1	**5.9**	**1.6**	.1	**19.0**
1994–95	New York	80	**78**	34.1	.395	.355	.737	2.7	5.1	1.2	.1	15.3
1995–96	New York	81	71	30.8	.443	.361	.753	2.9	3.9	1.3	.1	12.6
1996–97	New York	77	1	26.5	.431	**.369**	.769	2.7	2.8	1.2	.1	13.8
1997–98	New York	**82***	10	26.7	.393	.327	.787	2.8	2.7	1.0	.1	12.9
1998–99	Golden State	50*	50*	33.7	.370	.290	.740	**3.3**	4.7	1.4	.1	13.8
1999–00	Golden State	33	30	33.6	.378	.348	.833	2.8	5.2	1.1	.1	14.7
1999–00	Chicago	4	0	20.5	.324	.300	**1.000**	2.5	2.8	1.3	**.3**	7.5
2000–01	Utah	75	64	28.3	.398	.352	.802	2.1	2.4	1.0	.1	9.3
2001–02	Utah	66	1	14.1	.368	.305	.805	1.0	1.1	1.0	.0	4.4
Career		866	420	27.2	.412	.340	.769	2.5	3.6	1.1	.1	12.9
All-Star		1	0	20.0	.444	.333	-	3.0	3.0	1.0	0.0	9.0

=== Playoffs ===
Year	Team	GP	GS	MPG	FG%	3P%	FT%	RPG	APG	SPG	BPG	PPG
1991	New York	3	0	9.3	.400	-	**1.000**	1.0	2.0	.0	.0	2.0
1992	New York	12	0	24.6	.374	.239	.808	2.5	3.2	1.4	.0	12.1
1993	New York	15	15	38.3	.440	.373	.717	3.5	**6.4**	1.0	.2	**16.5**
1994	New York	**25**	**18**	33.6	.381	.356	.770	2.3	4.6	1.4	.1	14.6
1995	New York	11	11	34.5	.450	.411	.619	2.3	5.2	1.2	.1	15.6
1996	New York	8	8	**39.3**	.448	**.467**	.744	3.6	4.1	**1.6**	.1	16.0
1997	New York	9	1	28.1	.444	.317	.806	3.4	2.8	1.1	.0	14.0
1998	New York	10	2	31.4	**.472**	.424	.875	**4.0**	2.3	**1.6**	.1	16.4
2001	Utah	3	0	12.0	.333	.250	**1.000**	1.0	.3	.3	**.3**	3.7
Career		96	55	31.6	.421	.371	.759	2.8	4.1	1.3	.1	14.2

== Awards and honors ==
NBA

- NBA All-Star (1994)
- NBA All-Defensive Second Team (1993)
- NBA Sixth Man of the Year (1997)
- NBA three-point scoring leader: (1995)
- McDonald's Open winner (1990)

CBA

- CBA All-Star (1990)

== Publications ==
- Starks, John (2004), My Life, Sports Publishing LLC, ISBN 1-58261-802-X

== See also ==
- List of National Basketball Association career playoff 3-point scoring leaders
- Knicks–Heat rivalry
- Bulls–Knicks rivalry
