= 1994–95 New York Knicks season =

Season of National Basketball Association team the New York Knicks

- Head coach: Pat Riley
- General manager: Ernie Grunfeld
- Owners: Cablevision; ITT Corporation
- Arena: Madison Square Garden

Results
- Record: 55–27 (.671)
- Place: Division: 2nd (Atlantic); Conference: 3rd (Eastern)
- Playoff finish: Conference semifinals (lost to Pacers 3–4)
- Stats at Basketball Reference

Local media
- Television: MSG Network
- Radio: WFAN

The 1994–95 New York Knicks season was the 49th season for the team in the National Basketball Association (NBA). The Knicks entered the season as runner-ups of the 1994 NBA Finals, where they lost to the Houston Rockets in seven games.

== Season summary ==
=== Off-season ===
During the off-season, the Knicks acquired Doug Christie from the Los Angeles Lakers. In the 1994 NBA draft, the team selected small forward Monty Williams out of Notre Dame University with the 24th overall pick, and also selected point guard Charlie Ward out of Florida State University with the 26th overall pick.

=== Regular season ===
Christie only played twelve games due to an ankle injury, and Ward only played ten games due to a wrist injury. In December, the team released Doc Rivers to free agency; Rivers later signed as a free agent with the San Antonio Spurs.

In the regular season, the Knicks played around .500 in winning percentage with a 12–12 record, after a five-game losing streak in December. However, the team posted an eight-game winning streak between December and January afterwards, won 17 of their next 19 games, and later on held a 30–16 record at the All-Star break. The Knicks finished in second place in the Atlantic Division with a 55–27 record, two games behind the top-seeded Orlando Magic, who won the Division title. By earning the third seed in the Eastern Conference, the Knicks qualified for the NBA playoffs for the eighth consecutive year.

Patrick Ewing averaged 23.9 points, 11.0 rebounds and 2.0 blocks per game, while John Starks averaged 15.3 points and 5.1 assists per game, and led the league with 217 three-point field goals, becoming the first player ever to reach up to 200 three-pointers in a single season. In addition, Charles D. Smith provided the team with 12.7 points and 1.3 blocks per game, while Derek Harper contributed 11.5 points and 5.7 assists per game, along with 106 three-point field goals. Sixth man Anthony Mason averaged 9.9 points and 8.4 rebounds per game off the bench, and was named the NBA Sixth Man of the Year. Meanwhile, Charles Oakley averaged 10.1 points and 8.9 rebounds per game in only 50 games, due to a toe injury, while off the bench, three-point specialist Hubert Davis contributed 10.0 points per game and 131 three-point field goals, and Greg Anthony provided the Knicks with 6.1 points and 2.6 assists per game.

During the NBA All-Star weekend at the America West Arena in Phoenix, Arizona, Ewing was selected for the 1995 NBA All-Star Game, as a member of the Eastern Conference All-Star team; he also finished in fourth place in Most Valuable Player voting. The Knicks finished sixth in the NBA in home-game attendance, with an attendance of 810,283 at Madison Square Garden during the regular season.

=== NBA playoffs ===
In the Eastern Conference First Round of the 1995 NBA playoffs, the Knicks faced off against the 6th–seeded Cleveland Cavaliers, a team that featured Mark Price, All-Star forward Tyrone Hill, and second-year forward Chris Mills. Despite losing Game 2 at home to the Cavaliers, 90–84 at Madison Square Garden, the Knicks won the next two games over the Cavaliers on the road, including a Game 4 win at the Gund Arena, 93–80 to win the series in four games, and advance to the Eastern Conference Semi-finals.

In the Semi-finals, and for the third consecutive year, the Knicks faced off against the 2nd–seeded and Central Division champion Indiana Pacers, who were led by All-Star guard Reggie Miller, Rik Smits, and former Knicks guard Mark Jackson. Despite the Pacers being the second seed in the East, and winning the Central Division title, the Knicks had home-court advantage in this series, since they had a better regular-season record than the Pacers.

The Pacers defeated the Knicks in Game 1 at Madison Square Garden, 107–105, as Miller scored eight points in the final 18.7 seconds to bring the Pacers back from a six-point deficit. The Pacers gained a 3–1 series edge, before the Knicks won two straight games to force a seventh game back home in New York City. With the Knicks down by two points in the final seconds, Ewing had a chance to send the game into overtime, but missed his driving layup attempt, as the Pacers defeated the Knicks, 97–95, thus winning in a hard-fought seven-game series to advance to the Eastern Conference Finals.

=== Aftermath ===
Following the season, Pat Riley resigned as head coach after four seasons with the Knicks, and became the President of basketball operations and head coach of the Miami Heat. Meanwhile, Anthony was left unprotected in the 1995 NBA expansion draft, where he was selected by the Vancouver Grizzlies expansion team, and Anthony Bonner was released to free agency, and left to play overseas in Italy.

== NBA draft ==
Round	Pick	Player	Position	Nationality	School/Club team
1	24	Monty Williams	SF	United States	Notre Dame
1	26	Charlie Ward	PG	United States	Florida State

== Roster ==
1994–95 New York Knicks roster
Players

Pos.	No.	Player	Height	Weight	DOB	From
G	50	Greg Anthony	6 ft 0 in (1.83 m)	176 lb (80 kg)	1967–11–15	UNLV
F	4	Anthony Bonner	6 ft 8 in (2.03 m)	215 lb (98 kg)	1968–06–08	Saint Louis
G	7	Doug Christie	6 ft 6 in (1.98 m)	200 lb (91 kg)	1970–05–09	Pepperdine
G	44	Hubert Davis	6 ft 5 in (1.96 m)	183 lb (83 kg)	1970–05–17	North Carolina
C	33	Patrick Ewing	7 ft 0 in (2.13 m)	240 lb (109 kg)	1962–08–05	Georgetown
G	11	Derek Harper	6 ft 4 in (1.93 m)	185 lb (84 kg)	1961–10–13	Illinois
F	14	Anthony Mason	6 ft 7 in (2.01 m)	250 lb (113 kg)	1966–12–14	Tennessee State
F	34	Charles Oakley	6 ft 8 in (2.03 m)	225 lb (102 kg)	1963–12–18	Virginia Union
F	54	Charles Smith	6 ft 10 in (2.08 m)	230 lb (104 kg)	1965–07–16	Pittsburgh
G	3	John Starks	6 ft 3 in (1.91 m)	180 lb (82 kg)	1965–08–10	Oklahoma State
G	21	Charlie Ward	6 ft 2 in (1.88 m)	190 lb (86 kg)	1970–10–12	Florida State
C	32	Herb Williams	6 ft 10 in (2.08 m)	242 lb (110 kg)	1958–02–16	Ohio State
F	2	Monty Williams	6 ft 8 in (2.03 m)	225 lb (102 kg)	1971–10–08	Notre Dame

Coaches
Head coach
- Pat Riley
Assistant(s)
- Jeff Nix
- Bob Salmi
- Jeff Van Gundy

Legend
- (DP) Unsigned draft pick
- (FA) Free agent
- (S) Suspended
- (IN) Inactive
- Injured

Roster

== Season standings ==
=== Division ===
Atlantic Division	W	L	PCT	GB	Home	Road	Div
c-Orlando Magic	57	25	.695	—	39–2	18–23	18–10
x-New York Knicks	55	27	.671	2	29–12	26–15	23–5
x-Boston Celtics	35	47	.427	22	20–21	15–26	14–14
Miami Heat	32	50	.390	25	22–19	10–31	9–19
New Jersey Nets	30	52	.366	27	20–21	10–31	13–15
Philadelphia 76ers	24	58	.293	33	14–27	10–31	12–16
Washington Bullets	21	61	.256	36	13–28	8–33	9–19

=== Conference ===
#	Eastern Conference				
#	Team	W	L	PCT	GB
1	c-Orlando Magic	57	25	.695	–
2	y-Indiana Pacers	52	30	.634	5
3	x-New York Knicks	55	27	.671	2
4	x-Charlotte Hornets	50	32	.610	7
5	x-Chicago Bulls	47	35	.573	10
6	x-Cleveland Cavaliers	43	39	.524	14
7	x-Atlanta Hawks	42	40	.512	15
8	x-Boston Celtics	35	47	.427	22
9	Milwaukee Bucks	34	48	.415	23
10	Miami Heat	32	50	.390	25
11	New Jersey Nets	30	52	.366	27
12	Detroit Pistons	28	54	.341	29
13	Philadelphia 76ers	24	58	.293	33
14	Washington Bullets	21	61	.256	36

Notes

- z – Clinched home court advantage for the entire playoffs
- c – Clinched home court advantage for the conference playoffs
- y – Clinched division title
- x – Clinched playoff spot

== Game log ==
=== Regular season ===
1994–95 game log
Total: 55–27 (home: 29–12; road: 26–15)
November: 7–4 (home: 4–1; road: 3–3)

Game	Date	Team	Score	High points	High rebounds	High assists	Location Attendance	Record
1	November 4	@ Boston	W 120–107	Charles Smith (23)	Patrick Ewing (13)	Derek Harper (11)	Boston Garden; 14,890	1–0
2	November 8	L.A. Lakers	W 117–113	Patrick Ewing (24)	Charles Oakley (12)	Derek Harper (8)	Madison Square Garden; 19,763	2–0
3	November 10	Orlando	W 101–99	Patrick Ewing (24)	Charles Smith (13)	Derek Harper (9)	Madison Square Garden; 19,763	3–0
4	November 12	@ San Antonio	L 82–101	Patrick Ewing (22)	Charles Oakley (10)	Greg Anthony (5)	Alamodome; 19,710	3–1
5	November 14	@ Utah	L 97–110	John Starks (35)	Patrick Ewing (7)	John Starks (8)	Delta Center; 18,955	3–2
6	November 16	@ L.A. Lakers	W 110–89	Hubert Davis (27)	Ewing, Oakley (8)	Mason, Anthony (7)	Great Western Forum; 13,630	4–2
7	November 17	@ Golden State	L 100–109	Derek Harper (21)	Charles Oakley (14)	Derek Harper (7)	Oakland-Alameda County Coliseum Arena; 15,025	4–3
8	November 19	Atlanta	W 92–79	Charles Smith (24)	Charles Oakley (15)	three players tied (5)	Madison Square Garden; 19,763	5–3
9	November 21	San Antonio	W 92–88	Charles Oakley (16)	Oakley, Ewing (7)	three players tied (5)	Madison Square Garden; 19,763	6–3
10	November 26	Charlotte	L 82–101	Patrick Ewing (22)	Ewing, Oakley (14)	John Starks (7)	Madison Square Garden; 19,763	6–4
11	November 29	@ Washington	W 99–91	Patrick Ewing (20)	Patrick Ewing (15)	Derek Harper (6)	US Airways Arena; 18,756	7–4

December: 8–8 (home: 4–3; road: 4–5)

Game	Date	Team	Score	High points	High rebounds	High assists	Location Attendance	Record
12	December 2	@ Orlando	L 100–125	Patrick Ewing (15)	Charles Oakley (11)	John Starks (7)	Orlando Arena; 16,010	7–5
13	December 3	Washington	W 111–95	Charles Smith (23)	Patrick Ewing (10)	Greg Anthony (8)	Madison Square Garden; 19,763	8–5
14	December 5	@ Philadelphia	W 101–96 (OT)	Patrick Ewing (25)	Charles Oakley (15)	Harper, Ewing (6)	CoreStates Spectrum; 14,212	9–5
15	December 6	Boston	W 104–90	Charles Smith (20)	Oakley, Mason (12)	Greg Anthony (10)	Madison Square Garden; 19,763	10–5
16	December 9	@ Atlanta	L 85–89	Ewing, Smith (20)	Charles Oakley (15)	John Starks (6)	The Omni; 14,967	10–6
17	December 10	Philadelphia	W 107–103	Patrick Ewing (28)	Charles Oakley (16)	Derek Harper (9)	Madison Square Garden; 19,763	11–6
18	December 12	Miami	L 111–122	Patrick Ewing (30)	Charles Oakley (12)	John Starks (7)	Madison Square Garden; 19,763	11–7
19	December 15	@ Sacramento	W 94–84	Patrick Ewing (27)	Patrick Ewing (18)	John Starks (9)	ARCO Arena; 17,317	12–7
20	December 16	@ Phoenix	L 85–106	Patrick Ewing (15)	Patrick Ewing (12)	Derek Harper (6)	America West Arena; 19,023	12–8
21	December 18	@ Portland	L 87–111	Patrick Ewing (24)	Patrick Ewing (14)	Derek Harper (6)	Memorial Coliseum; 12,888	12–9
22	December 20	New Jersey	L 83–85	Patrick Ewing (22)	Patrick Ewing (11)	Hubert Davis (4)	Madison Square Garden; 19,763	12–10
23	December 22	Cleveland	L 90–93	Charles Oakley (19)	Charles Oakley (13)	Derek Harper (6)	Madison Square Garden; 19,763	12–11
24	December 25	@ Chicago	L 104–107 (OT)	Patrick Ewing (30)	Patrick Ewing (13)	three players tied (6)	United Center; 22,854	12–12
25	December 27	@ New Jersey	W 99–91	John Starks (22)	Ewing, Mason (8)	Ewing, M. Williams (5)	Brendan Byrne Arena; 20,049	13–12
26	December 28	Detroit	W 101–93	Patrick Ewing (30)	Anthony Mason (14)	John Starks (8)	Madison Square Garden; 19,763	14–12
27	December 30	@ Minnesota	W 90–81	Patrick Ewing (30)	Patrick Ewing (12)	Harper, Starks (7)	Target Center; 18,122	15–12

January: 13–2 (home: 8–1; road: 5–1)

Game	Date	Team	Score	High points	High rebounds	High assists	Location Attendance	Record
28	January 4	Atlanta	W 89–80	Patrick Ewing (21)	Patrick Ewing (12)	Ewing, Harper (4)	Madison Square Garden; 19,763	16–12
29	January 6	@ Cleveland	W 103–93	John Starks (23)	Patrick Ewing (11)	Derek Harper (7)	Gund Arena; 20,562	17–12
30	January 8	Minnesota	W 102–87	Ewing, Davis (22)	Ewing, Mason (9)	Derek Harper (8)	Madison Square Garden; 19,763	18–12
31	January 10	Indiana	W 117–105	John Starks (22)	Patrick Ewing (9)	Derek Harper (13)	Madison Square Garden; 19,763	19–12
32	January 13	@ Milwaukee	W 91–88	Patrick Ewing (24)	Patrick Ewing (14)	Derek Harper (7)	Bradley Center; 17,909	20–12
33	January 14	Utah	L 81–86	John Starks (22)	Patrick Ewing (14)	Derek Harper (6)	Madison Square Garden; 19,763	20–13
34	January 16	New Jersey	W 107–90	Patrick Ewing (32)	Patrick Ewing (15)	John Starks (9)	Madison Square Garden; 19,763	21–13
35	January 19, 1995; 8:00 p.m. EST	@ Houston	W 93–77	Starks (22)	Ewing (18)	Starks (7)	The Summit; 16,611	22–13
36	January 20	@ Dallas	W 106–93	Patrick Ewing (36)	Patrick Ewing (12)	Derek Harper (11)	Reunion Arena; 17,502	23–13
37	January 22	@ Miami	W 104–95	John Starks (26)	Patrick Ewing (15)	Derek Harper (9)	Miami Arena; 15,200	24–13
38	January 24	Portland	W 105–99	John Starks (26)	Anthony Mason (15)	Mason, Ewing (5)	Madison Square Garden; 19,763	25–13
39	January 26	L.A. Clippers	W 87–74	Patrick Ewing (21)	Anthony Mason (13)	Derek Harper (5)	Madison Square Garden; 19,763	26–13
40	January 27	@ Charlotte	L 90–105	John Starks (26)	Anthony Mason (11)	Derek Harper (6)	Charlotte Coliseum; 23,698	26–14
41	January 29	Phoenix	W 107–88	Patrick Ewing (35)	Anthony Mason (19)	John Starks (9)	Madison Square Garden; 19,763	27–14
42	January 31	Golden State	W 90–87	Derek Harper (26)	Patrick Ewing (14)	John Starks (8)	Madison Square Garden; 19,763	28–14

February: 7–5 (home: 4–2; road: 3–3)

Game	Date	Team	Score	High points	High rebounds	High assists	Location Attendance	Record
43	February 3	@ Philadelphia	W 106–86	Patrick Ewing (30)	Patrick Ewing (15)	Derek Harper (7)	CoreStates Spectrum; 18,168	29–14
44	February 5	@ Orlando	L 100–103 (OT)	Patrick Ewing (38)	Patrick Ewing (13)	Harper, Starks (7)	Orlando Arena; 16,010	29–15
45	February 7	Milwaukee	L 87–95	Ewing, Starks (23)	Patrick Ewing (17)	Derek Harper (7)	Madison Square Garden; 19,763	29–16
46	February 8	@ Indiana	W 96–77	Ewing, Starks (24)	Patrick Ewing (22)	Derek Harper (6)	Market Square Arena; 16,677	30–16
All-Star Break
47	February 14	@ Detroit	L 94–106	Patrick Ewing (24)	Patrick Ewing (15)	John Starks (7)	The Palace of Auburn Hills; 15,513	30–17
48	February 16	@ Miami	W 96–87	Ewing, Mason (22)	Anthony Mason (14)	Mason, Starks (5)	Miami Arena; 15,200	31–17
49	February 17	Miami	W 100–91	Hubert Davis (21)	Anthony Mason (11)	Harper, Anthony (5)	Madison Square Garden; 19,763	32–17
50	February 19, 1995; 1:00 p.m. EST	Houston	W 122–117	Ewing (31)	Mason (10)	Harper (9)	Madison Square Garden; 19,763	33–17
51	February 21	Cleveland	L 91–99	Patrick Ewing (35)	Patrick Ewing (9)	Starks, Harper (7)	Madison Square Garden; 19,763	33–18
52	February 23	Sacramento	W 103–90	Patrick Ewing (38)	Anthony Mason (12)	Derek Harper (9)	Madison Square Garden; 19,763	34–18
53	February 26	Philadelphia	W 104–99	Patrick Ewing (32)	Patrick Ewing (18)	Derek Harper (6)	Madison Square Garden; 19,763	35–18
54	February 28	@ Orlando	L 106–118	Patrick Ewing (32)	Patrick Ewing (15)	Starks, Harper (6)	Orlando Arena; 16,010	35–19

March: 11–5 (home: 5–3; road: 6–2)

Game	Date	Team	Score	High points	High rebounds	High assists	Location Attendance	Record
55	March 2	Chicago	W 93–89	Anthony Mason (26)	Anthony Mason (12)	Anthony Mason (7)	Madison Square Garden; 19,763	36–19
56	March 4	@ Cleveland	W 89–76	John Starks (29)	Anthony Mason (14)	Starks, Harper (6)	Gund Arena; 20,562	37–19
57	March 7	Boston	W 115–110	Patrick Ewing (46)	Patrick Ewing (12)	Derek Harper (10)	Madison Square Garden; 19,763	38–19
58	March 8	@ Boston	W 108–100	Hubert Davis (22)	Anthony Mason (12)	Anthony Mason (7)	Boston Garden; 14,890	39–19
59	March 10	@ Atlanta	L 81–108	John Starks (17)	Patrick Ewing (10)	John Starks (5)	Omni Coliseum; 14,596	39–20
60	March 11	Seattle	L 84–96	Patrick Ewing (34)	Ewing, Oakley (10)	John Starks (8)	Madison Square Garden; 19,763	39–21
61	March 14	Denver	W 94–74	Patrick Ewing (21)	Charles Oakley (17)	Derek Harper (5)	Madison Square Garden; 19,763	40–21
62	March 17	@ Washington	W 89–81	Patrick Ewing (36)	Charles Oakley (11)	John Starks (8)	US Airways Arena; 18,756	41–21
63	March 18	New Jersey	W 92–91 (OT)	John Starks (25)	Patrick Ewing (14)	Derek Harper (7)	Madison Square Garden; 19,763	42–21
64	March 21	Charlotte	L 69–78	Patrick Ewing (35)	Patrick Ewing (18)	Derek Harper (9)	Madison Square Garden; 19,763	42–22
65	March 23	@ Denver	W 104–101	Patrick Ewing (22)	Ewing, Smith (8)	John Starks (9)	McNichols Sports Arena; 17,171	43–22
66	March 25	@ L.A. Clippers	W 94–86	Patrick Ewing (27)	Patrick Ewing (8)	Derek Harper (6)	Los Angeles Memorial Sports Arena; 16,021	44–22
67	March 26	@ Seattle	L 93–82	Patrick Ewing (27)	Anthony Mason (10)	John Starks (5)	Tacoma Dome; 18,056	44–23
68	March 28	Chicago	L 111–113	Patrick Ewing (36)	Charles Oakley (8)	Derek Harper (7)	Madison Square Garden; 19,763	44–24
69	March 29	@ Detroit	W 107–97	Patrick Ewing (28)	Charles Oakley (9)	Derek Harper (7)	The Palace of Auburn Hills; 17,067	45–24
70	March 31	Dallas	W 101–90	Patrick Ewing (18)	Anthony Bonner (9)	Harper, Anthony (6)	Madison Square Garden; 19,763	46–24

April: 8–3 (home: 4–2; road: 4–1)

Game	Date	Team	Score	High points	High rebounds	High assists	Location Attendance	Record
71	April 2	@ New Jersey	W 94–85	John Starks (26)	Charles Oakley (12)	Anthony Mason (6)	Brendan Byrne Arena; 20,049	47–24
72	April 4	Indiana	L 90–94	Patrick Ewing (28)	Anthony Mason (14)	Derek Harper (12)	Madison Square Garden; 19,763	47–25
73	April 5	@ Milwaukee	W 114–94	Patrick Ewing (34)	Patrick Ewing (18)	John Starks (6)	Bradley Center; 14,679	48–25
74	April 8	Detroit	W 113–96	Patrick Ewing (19)	Anthony Mason (9)	John Starks (8)	Madison Square Garden; 19,763	49–25
75	April 11	Miami	W 112–99	Patrick Ewing (31)	Ewing, Mason (12)	John Starks (9)	Madison Square Garden; 19,763	50–25
76	April 13	Washington	W 110–100	Patrick Ewing (25)	Patrick Ewing (8)	Greg Anthony (7)	Madison Square Garden; 19,763	51–25
77	April 14	@ Indiana	W 88–84	Patrick Ewing (30)	Patrick Ewing (12)	John Starks (7)	Market Square Arena; 16,702	52–25
78	April 16	@ Chicago	L 90–111	Charles Smith (22)	Anthony Mason (13)	Derek Harper (4)	United Center; 23,889	52–26
79	April 17	Milwaukee	L 93–99	Anthony Mason (17)	Patrick Ewing (13)	Anthony Mason (7)	Madison Square Garden; 19,763	52–27
80	April 20	@ Charlotte	W 91–86	John Starks (18)	Anthony Mason (9)	John Starks (7)	Charlotte Coliseum; 23,698	53–27
81	April 21	@ Boston	W 99–92	Hubert Davis (20)	Charles Oakley (16)	Greg Anthony (8)	Boston Garden; 14,890	54–27
82	April 23	Orlando	W 113–99	Charles Smith (29)	Anthony Mason (12)	Mason, Anthony (6)	Madison Square Garden; 19,763	55–27

1994–95 schedule

=== Playoffs ===
1995 playoff game log
First Round: 3–1 (home: 1–1; road: 2–0)

Game	Date	Team	Score	High points	High rebounds	High assists	Location Attendance	Series
1	April 27	Cleveland	W 103–79	Patrick Ewing (21)	Charles Oakley (11)	John Starks (7)	Madison Square Garden; 19,763	1–0
2	April 29	Cleveland	L 84–90	Ewing, Starks (21)	Patrick Ewing (12)	Charles Oakley (5)	Madison Square Garden; 19,763	1–1
3	May 1	@ Cleveland	W 83–81	Patrick Ewing (23)	Patrick Ewing (10)	Derek Harper (5)	Gund Arena; 19,352	2–1
4	May 4	@ Cleveland	W 93–80	Derek Harper (30)	Patrick Ewing (13)	Charles Oakley (8)	Gund Arena; 18,575	3–1

Conference semifinals: 3–4 (home: 2–2; road: 1–2)

Game	Date	Team	Score	High points	High rebounds	High assists	Location Attendance	Series
1	May 7	Indiana	L 105–107	John Starks (21)	Oakley, Ewing (10)	John Starks (7)	Madison Square Garden; 19,763	0–1
2	May 9	Indiana	W 96–77	Derek Harper (24)	Anthony Mason (8)	Derek Harper (8)	Madison Square Garden; 19,763	1–1
3	May 11	@ Indiana	L 95–97	Oakley, Starks (23)	Charles Oakley (7)	John Starks (9)	Market Square Arena; 16,675	1–2
4	May 13	@ Indiana	L 84–98	Patrick Ewing (25)	Charles Oakley (10)	Derek Harper (10)	Market Square Arena; 16,678	1–3
5	May 17	Indiana	W 96–95	Patrick Ewing (19)	Charles Oakley (13)	John Starks (7)	Madison Square Garden; 19,763	2–3
6	May 19	@ Indiana	W 92–82	Patrick Ewing (25)	Patrick Ewing (15)	Derek Harper (7)	Market Square Arena; 16,679	3–3
7	May 21	Indiana	L 95–97	Patrick Ewing (29)	Patrick Ewing (14)	Harper, Oakley (6)	Madison Square Garden; 19,763	3–4

1995 schedule

== Awards and honors ==
- Patrick Ewing was named Player of the Week for games played January 15 through January 22.
- Patrick Ewing was named Player of the Month for January.
- Patrick Ewing was selected as a reserve for the Eastern Conference in the All-Star Game; it was his ninth All-Star selection.
- Anthony Mason received the NBA Sixth Man of the Year Award.
- John Starks led the league in three-point field goals with 217.
- John Starks led the league in three-point field goal attempts with 611.

== Player stats ==
Legend
GP	Games played	GS	Games started	MPG	Minutes per game
FG%	Field-goal percentage	3P%	3-point field-goal percentage	FT%	Free-throw percentage
RPG	Rebounds per game	APG	Assists per game	SPG	Steals per game
BPG	Blocks per game	PPG	Points per game

=== Regular season ===
Player	GP	GS	MPG	FG%	3P%	FT%	RPG	APG	SPG	BPG	PPG
Greg Anthony	61	2	15.5	.437	.361	.789	1.0	2.6	.8	.1	6.1
Anthony Bonner	58	23	19.4	.456	.200	.657	4.5	1.4	.8	.4	3.8
Doug Christie	12	0	6.6	.227	.143	.800	1.1	.7	.2	.1	1.3
Hubert Davis	82	4	20.7	.480	.455	.808	1.3	1.8	.4	.1	10.0
Patrick Ewing	79	79	37.0	.503	.286	.750	11.0	2.7	.9	2.0	23.9
Ron Grandison	2	0	4.0	.250	.000	.000	2.5	1.0	.0	.0	1.0
Derek Harper	80	80	34.0	.446	.363	.724	2.4	5.7	1.0	.1	11.5
Greg Kite	2	0	8.0	.000	.000	.000	2.0	.0	.0	.0	.0
Anthony Mason	77	11	32.4	.566	.000	.641	8.4	3.1	.9	.3	9.9
Charles Oakley	50	49	31.3	.489	.250	.793	8.9	2.5	1.2	.1	10.1
Doc Rivers	3	0	15.7	.308	.600	.727	3.0	2.7	1.3	.0	6.3
Charles Smith	76	58	28.3	.471	.226	.792	4.3	1.6	.6	1.3	12.7
John Starks	80	78	34.1	.395	.355	.737	2.7	5.1	1.2	.1	15.3
Charlie Ward	10	0	4.4	.211	.100	.700	.6	.4	.2	.0	1.6
Herb Williams	56	3	13.3	.456	.000	.622	2.4	.5	.2	.8	3.3
Monty Williams	41	23	12.3	.451	.000	.447	2.4	1.2	.5	.1	3.3

=== Playoffs ===
Player	GP	GS	MPG	FG%	3P%	FT%	RPG	APG	SPG	BPG	PPG
Greg Anthony	11	0	12.3	.395	.304	.909	.9	1.4	.2	.2	4.3
Anthony Bonner	6	0	6.3	.545	.000	.500	1.3	.3	.2	.2	2.5
Doug Christie	2	0	3.0	.000	.000	.000	.0	.0	.0	.0	.0
Hubert Davis	11	0	16.7	.354	.370	1.000	.6	.8	.1	.5	4.2
Patrick Ewing	11	11	36.3	.513	.333	.686	9.6	2.5	.5	2.3	19.0
Derek Harper	11	11	35.3	.514	.574	.750	3.5	5.6	1.0	.1	14.3
Anthony Mason	11	0	32.0	.608	.000	.623	6.2	2.2	.5	.5	9.5
Charles Oakley	11	11	38.3	.450	.400	.824	8.5	3.7	1.7	.5	13.1
Charles Smith	11	11	27.5	.537	.000	.567	3.8	1.2	1.2	1.5	10.8
John Starks	11	11	34.5	.450	.411	.619	2.3	5.2	1.2	0.1	15.6
Herb Williams	8	0	6.9	.231	.000	1.000	.9	.0	.6	.6	1.0
Monty Williams	1	0	4.0	1.000	.000	.000	.0	.0	.0	.0	4.0

Player statistics citation:

== Transactions ==
The Knicks were involved in the following transactions during the 1994–95 season.

=== Trades ===
October 13, 1994	To New York Knicks Doug Christie	To Los Angeles Lakers 1997 second-round pick 1998 second-round pick (Note: Pick was conditional, and was not exercised.)

=== Free agents ===
==== Additions ====
Player	Signed	Former team
Ron Grandison	October 6	Rochester Renegade (CBA)
Greg Kite	January 3	Orlando Magic

==== Subtractions ====
Player	Left	New team
Rolando Blackman	waived, October 6	Rochester Renegade (CBA)
Ron Grandison	waived, December 15	Rapid City Thrillers (CBA)
Greg Kite	waived, January 3	Indiana Pacers

Player Transactions Citation:
