= Charles Oakley =

American basketball player (born 1963)

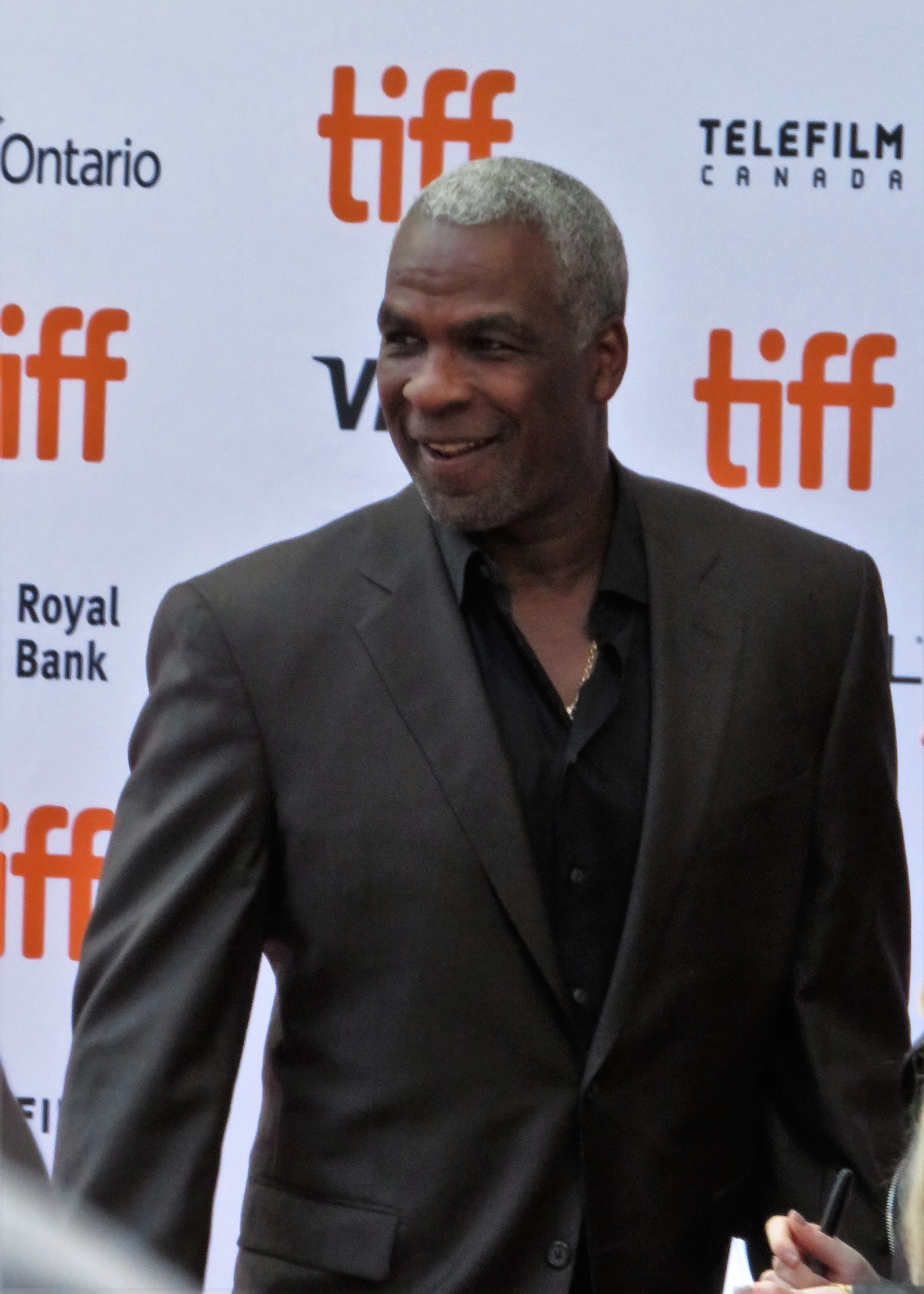
- Oakley at the 2017 Toronto International Film Festival

Personal information
- Born: December 18, 1963 (age 62) Cleveland, Ohio, U.S.
- Listed height: 6 ft 9 in (2.06 m)
- Listed weight: 245 lb (111 kg)

Career information
- High school: John Hay (Cleveland, Ohio)
- College: Virginia Union (1981–1985)
- NBA draft: 1985: 1st round, 9th overall pick
- Drafted by: Cleveland Cavaliers
- Playing career: 1985–2004
- Position: Power forward
- Number: 34, 33
- Coaching career: 2010–2011

Career history

Playing
- 1985–1988: Chicago Bulls
- 1988–1998: New York Knicks
- 1998–2001: Toronto Raptors
- 2001–2002: Chicago Bulls
- 2002–2003: Washington Wizards
- 2004: Houston Rockets

Career highlights
- NBA All-Star (1994); NBA All-Defensive First Team (1994); NBA All-Defensive Second Team (1998); NBA All-Rookie First Team (1986); NABC Division II Player of the Year (1985); NCAA Division II rebounding leader (1985)

Career statistics
- Points: 12,417 (9.7 ppg)
- Rebounds: 12,205 (9.5 rpg)
- Assists: 3,217 (2.5 apg)
- Stats at NBA.com
- Stats at Basketball Reference

Charles Oakley (born December 18, 1963) is an American former professional basketball player. Oakley is best known for playing ten of his nineteen seasons in the National Basketball Association with the New York Knicks. As a power forward, he consistently ranked as one of the best rebounders and defensive players in the NBA. He also played for the Chicago Bulls, Toronto Raptors, Washington Wizards, and Houston Rockets. From 2017-2025, he was the coach of the Killer 3's of the BIG3.

== Early life ==
Charles Oakley was born December 18, 1963, in Cleveland, Ohio, where he was raised. Oakley attended John Hay High School, where he excelled in basketball.

== College career ==
Oakley attended Virginia Union University, a Division II historically black university in Richmond, Virginia. As a senior in 1984–85, Oakley led Virginia Union to the 1985 NCAA championship. The Panthers had a 31–1 overall record that year, with Oakley averaging 24 points and 17.3 rebounds a game. Oakley was named the NCAA Division II Player of the Year. He scored 2,379 points and grabbed 1,642 rebounds in his college career.

== Professional career ==
=== Chicago Bulls (1985–1988) ===
Oakley was drafted with the 9th overall pick in the 1985 NBA draft by the Cleveland Cavaliers, but his draft rights were traded to the Chicago Bulls, alongside Calvin Duncan, for Ennis Whatley and Keith Lee. Oakley provided another scoring option and steady offensive and defensive performances to an up-and-coming Bulls squad led by Michael Jordan. On March 15, 1986, Oakley set a career high in points scored with 35, during a 125–116 loss to the Milwaukee Bucks. Oakley was selected as a part of the NBA All-Rookie First Team in 1986.

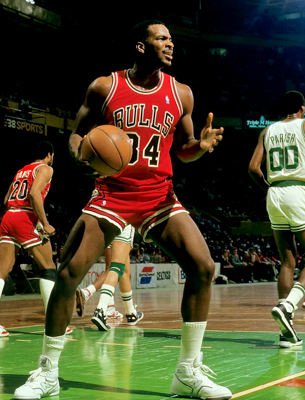
Charles Oakley during the 1986–87 season with the Chicago Bulls

Oakley also assumed the role of the team "enforcer", whose duty primarily was to protect young Jordan against cheap shots and roughhousing tactics of opposing players. He was given the nickname, "Oak Tree", for his rugged demeanor and no-nonsense attitude. On April 26, 1987, Oakley set a postseason career high with 25 points scored, alongside grabbing 15 rebounds, in a loss to the Boston Celtics.

At the end of the 1987-88 season, Oakley and Michael Cage, then of the Los Angeles Clippers, were in close competition to be the season's top rebounder. In the penultimate game of the season for the Bulls, Oakley collected 35 rebounds in a loss against the Cleveland Cavaliers, which remains the most in a single game since 1979. Two nights later, Oakley had 21 rebounds against the Boston Celtics to close the season. When Cage arrived at the Clippers' game later on, a note with the number 28 (the number of rebounds he would need to overcome Oakley) was taped to his locker. Cage would play all 48 minutes in that game and collect 30 rebounds.

=== New York Knicks (1988–1998) ===
With the drafting and development of Horace Grant, the Bulls traded Oakley to the New York Knicks for 7'1" center Bill Cartwright. Oakley eventually became a part of the core which the Knicks built around, which also featured Patrick Ewing, John Starks, Anthony Mason and point guard Mark Jackson.

During the Knicks' 1994 season, which included a record 25 playoff games, Oakley started every regular season and playoff game for a record 107 starts in a single season. On June 1, 1994, Oakley scored 12 points, grabbed 13 rebounds and recorded 7 assists in a Game 5 loss to the Indiana Pacers in the Eastern Conference Finals. The Knicks eventually won that series. The following round, during that year's NBA Finals, Oakley averaged 11 points and 11.9 rebounds per game in a tightly contested seven-game series loss to the Houston Rockets.

On March 11, 1998, Oakley grabbed a season high 22 rebounds in a loss against former teammate Anthony Mason and the Charlotte Hornets. Despite regular season success and consistent playoffs appearances, the Knicks did not return to the Finals again during Oakley's tenure. During his time with the Knicks, Oakley was known across the league for being a defensive specialist and outstanding rebounder.

=== Toronto Raptors (1998–2001) ===
In 1998, Oakley was traded by New York to the Toronto Raptors, alongside Sean Marks, for blossoming star Marcus Camby. For the Raptors, he provided a veteran presence to a young team that included Vince Carter and Tracy McGrady. On January 7, 2001, Oakley set a career high with 6 blocks, and also narrowly missed a triple-double with 12 points, 10 rebounds, and 7 assists.

=== Return to Chicago (2001–2002) ===
In 2001, Oakley was traded by the Toronto Raptors with a 2002 2nd-round pick to the Chicago Bulls for Brian Skinner. This was his second tenure with the Bulls. Starting 36 of his 57 played games, he averaged 3.8 points per game, 6 rebounds per game, and 2 assists per game.

=== Washington Wizards (2002–2003) ===
In 2002, Oakley signed as a free agent with the Washington Wizards, where he was reunited with former teammate Michael Jordan. Oakley played 42 games during the 2002–03 season, averaging 1.8 points per game, 2.5 rebounds per game, and 1 assist per game.

=== Houston Rockets (2004) ===
The 2003–04 season was Oakley's last season. On March 18, 2004, Oakley signed the first of two 10-day contracts with the Houston Rockets. Oakley played only 7 games, in which he averaged 1.3 points per game, 0.7 rebounds per game, and 0.3 assists per game. At the end of the season, Oakley retired from the NBA.

In 2007 Oakley was reported to be attempting an NBA comeback, at age 44. He claimed Dallas, Miami, Cleveland and New York were interested, but said he would "not [come] back cheap".

== Coaching and businesses ==
On December 26, 2010, Oakley was hired as an assistant coach for the Charlotte Bobcats under then-head coach Paul Silas.

He left that position on December 1, 2011, after experiencing health issues with back pain, during the 2010–11 season.

Oakley owns several commercial enterprises, including:

- Hair Solutions and Nails EtCetera in East Cleveland, Ohio, "salons started with seed money from Oakley and run by his sisters"
- Oakley's car wash, oil change, and detail centers in Brighton Beach, Brooklyn and Yonkers, New York
- Oakley's Wash House, a combination car wash and laundromat Oakley founded in East Cleveland, Ohio, overseen by his sister Carolyn and mother Corine
- Red, The Steakhouse, restaurants in Cleveland, Ohio, and South Beach, Miami, Florida

== Legacy ==
Oakley was inducted into the Virginia Sports Hall of Fame and Museum in honor of his 19-year professional basketball career. The induction ceremony was held on April 30, 2016.

In September 2016, a portion of Deering Street in Oakley's hometown of Cleveland (near his alma mater of John Hay High School) was renamed Charles Oakley Way in his honor.

He was inducted into the CIAA Hall of Fame in 2005 after his career at Virginia Union University.

Has a Cousin Vickie Primes(Giles) she is Charles’ mom nice and Vickie’s grandson is Jayce Primes and is from Cleveland Oh and goes to Bethany Christian Church (D.O.C.) where he serves as a Junior Usher.

=== Career highlights ===
- He placed in the top ten in rebounds per game five times between 1987 and 1994 (second in 1987 and 1988).
- Due to his durability he actually placed in the top ten in total rebounds 6 times and led the league in total rebounds twice (1987 and 1988).
- In 1994, he became an NBA All-Star and was chosen to the league's All-Defense 1st team.
- Oakley currently ranks 25th all-time in NBA games played with 1,282 games, and 22nd all-time in career rebounds with 12,205 rebounds.

== Personal life ==
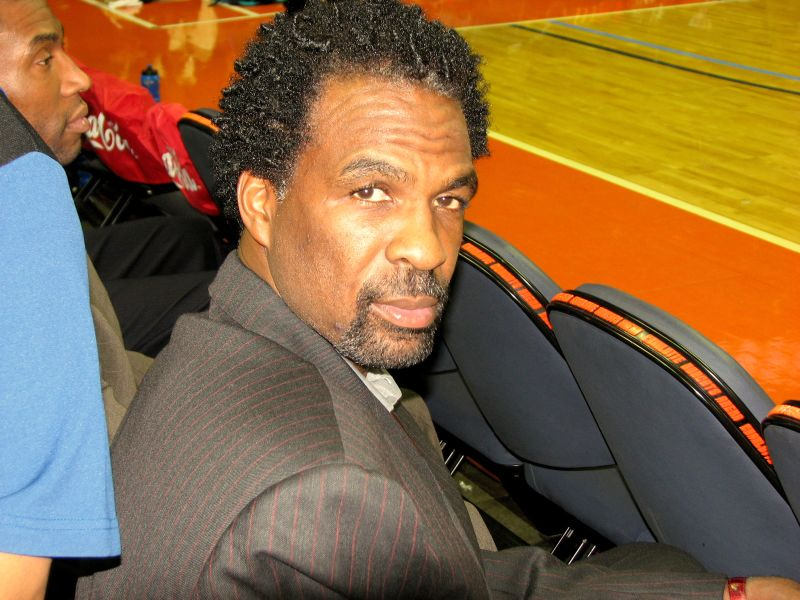
Oakley in 2007

In 2011, Oakley filed a lawsuit against the Aria Resort and Casino in Las Vegas, alleging a group assault by five security guards employed by the casino on May 28, 2010.

On July 30, 2016, Oakley married his wife Angela Reed. Starting in 2025, the Oakleys appeared on The Real Housewives of Atlanta during its sixteenth season and continue today.

Has a Cousin Vickie Primes(Giles) she is Charles’ mom nice and Vickie’s grandson is Jayce Primes and is from Cleveland Oh and goes to Bethany Christian Church (D.O.C.) where he serves as a Junior Usher.

=== Madison Square Garden arrest ===
On February 8, 2017, Oakley was involved in an altercation at Madison Square Garden as the Knicks faced the visiting Los Angeles Clippers. According to the Knicks, Oakley was ejected from the arena after he is alleged to have yelled at James L. Dolan, the Executive Chairman of Madison Square Garden and MSG Networks, and refused to stop, an allegation he denies. There were also accounts of him hitting a security guard in his face and shoving another guard before being dragged away from the game and handcuffed. He was charged with three counts of misdemeanor assault and criminal trespassing. In a statement, the Knicks stated that Oakley "came to the game tonight and behaved in a highly inappropriate and completely abusive manner. He was ejected and was then arrested by the New York City Police Department."

In response, Oakley claimed that he sat down in his seat and he saw the Knicks owner James Dolan look at him and within four minutes he was being asked to leave the arena. He says that he didn't become combative until he was asked to leave for no apparent reason. While admitting "I shouldn't have put my hands on anyone," Oakley disputed the Knicks' rendition of events in an interview with ESPN's The Undefeated, which reported that Oakley says he "never said a word to Dolan" and "was minding his own business when he was confronted by Madison Square Garden Security, who asked why he was sitting so close to Dolan before demanding that he leave the building."

On February 13, 2017, NBA legend Michael Jordan and NBA commissioner Adam Silver met with both Dolan and Oakley at NBA headquarters. Oakley and Dolan both apologized for the fallout and both were currently negotiating a truce. "Both Mr. Oakley and Mr. Dolan were apologetic about the incident and subsequent comments, and their negative impact on the Knicks organization and the NBA," Silver said. The statement says Dolan hopes Oakley can return to MSG as his guest in the near future. On February 14, 2017, the ban from Madison Square Garden was lifted. On September 12, 2017, it was reported that Oakley was filing a civil lawsuit over the incident. As of February 2022, the suit was still in litigation, according to Oakley.

Oakley later retorted on March 11, 2019, that Dolan is someone who tries to bully everyone because he has money and power as an owner of the Knicks, quoting that "it doesn't make sense." He also admits he has very little reason to hold any reconciliation with Dolan, noting his relationship with the Knicks was frayed before the incident occurred (though he still bought himself tickets for Knicks games a few times each season before the incident), while also saying nothing was really resolved from his meeting with Adam Silver. Oakley further notes the incident caused a damaged relationship with the team, to the point where the possibility of his jersey being retired was in jeopardy. This all came out after Dolan threatened to ban a fan from the arena for yelling at him to "sell the team" a few days prior.

== NBA career statistics ==
Legend
GP	Games played	GS	Games started	MPG	Minutes per game
FG%	Field goal percentage	3P%	3-point field goal percentage	FT%	Free throw percentage
RPG	Rebounds per game	APG	Assists per game	SPG	Steals per game
BPG	Blocks per game	PPG	Points per game	**Bold**	Career high
*	Led the league

=== Regular season ===
Year	Team	GP	GS	MPG	FG%	3P%	FT%	RPG	APG	SPG	BPG	PPG
1985–86	Chicago	77	30	23.0	.519	.000	.662	8.6	1.7	.9	.4	9.6
1986–87	Chicago	**82**	81	**36.3**	.445	**.367**	.686	**13.1**	**3.6**	1.0	.4	14.5
1987–88	Chicago	**82**	**82**	34.3	.483	.250	.727	13.0	3.0	.8	.3	12.4
1988–89	New York	**82**	**82**	31.8	.510	.250	.773	10.5	2.3	1.3	.2	12.9
1989–90	New York	61	61	36.0	**.524**	.000	.761	11.9	2.4	1.0	.3	**14.6**
1990–91	New York	76	74	36.0	.516	.000	.784	12.1	2.7	.8	.2	11.2
1991–92	New York	**82**	**82**	28.2	.522	.000	.735	8.5	1.6	.8	.2	6.2
1992–93	New York	**82**	**82**	27.2	.508	.000	.722	8.6	1.5	1.0	.2	6.9
1993–94	New York	**82**	**82**	35.8	.478	.000	.776	11.8	2.7	1.3	.2	11.8
1994–95	New York	50	49	31.3	.489	.250	.793	8.9	2.5	1.2	.1	10.1
1995–96	New York	53	51	33.5	.471	.269	.833	8.7	2.6	1.1	.3	11.4
1996–97	New York	80	80	35.9	.488	.263	.808	9.8	2.8	1.4	.3	10.8
1997–98	New York	79	79	34.6	.440	.000	**.851**	9.2	2.5	**1.6**	.3	9.0
1998–99	Toronto	50*	50*	32.9	.428	.200	.807	7.5	3.4	.9	.4	7.0
1999–00	Toronto	80	80	30.4	.418	.341	.776	6.8	3.2	1.3	**.6**	6.9
2000–01	Toronto	78	77	35.5	.388	.224	.836	9.5	3.4	1.0	**.6**	9.6
2001–02	Chicago	57	26	24.3	.369	.167	.750	6.0	2.0	.9	.2	3.8
2002–03	Washington	42	1	12.2	.418	–	.824	2.5	1.0	.3	.1	1.8
2003–04	Houston	7	0	3.6	.333	–	.833	.7	.3	.0	.0	1.3
Career		1,282	1,159	31.4	.471	.253	.761	9.5	2.5	1.1	.3	9.7
All-Star		1	0	11.0	.333	–	–	3.0	3.0	.0	.0	2.0

=== Playoffs ===
Year	Team	GP	GS	MPG	FG%	3P%	FT%	RPG	APG	SPG	BPG	PPG
1986	Chicago	3	–	29.3	**.524**	–	.615	10.0	1.0	2.0	**.7**	10.0
1987	Chicago	3	–	**43.0**	.380	.500	.833	**15.3**	2.0	1.3	.3	**20.0**
1988	Chicago	10	–	37.3	.440	.000	.875	12.8	3.2	.6	.4	10.1
1989	New York	9	–	33.2	.479	.500	.667	11.2	1.2	1.3	.1	9.7
1990	New York	10	–	33.6	.512	**1.000**	.654	11.0	2.7	1.1	.2	12.1
1991	New York	3	3	33.3	.476	–	.500	10.3	1.0	.7	.3	7.7
1992	New York	12	12	29.5	.379	–	.741	9.0	.7	.7	.4	5.3
1993	New York	15	15	33.8	.481	–	.727	11.0	1.1	1.1	.1	11.1
1994	New York	**25**	**25**	39.7	.477	–	.775	11.7	2.4	1.4	.2	13.2
1995	New York	11	11	38.3	.450	.400	.824	8.5	**3.7**	1.7	.5	13.1
1996	New York	8	8	38.5	.500	.333	.694	8.6	1.8	1.0	.0	13.1
1997	New York	10	10	35.8	.442	.000	.759	8.8	1.6	**2.2**	.3	9.8
1998	New York	10	10	34.2	.408	–	**.920**	8.5	1.4	1.1	.2	8.1
2000	Toronto	3	3	36.7	.483	.286	.000	7.7	**3.7**	2.0	.3	10.0
2001	Toronto	12	12	32.6	.435	.375	.824	6.3	1.8	1.0	.6	9.3
Career		144	–	35.5	.459	.366	.755	10.0	2.0	1.2	.3	10.8

== See also ==
- List of NBA career games played leaders
- List of NBA career rebounding leaders
- List of NBA career turnovers leaders
- List of NBA career personal fouls leaders
- List of NBA career minutes played leaders
- List of NBA career playoff rebounding leaders
- List of NBA single-game rebounding leaders
- List of NBA seasons played leaders
- List of oldest and youngest NBA players
