= 1994–95 Chicago Bulls season =

NBA professional basketball team season

- Head coach: Phil Jackson
- General manager: Jerry Krause
- Owner: Jerry Reinsdorf
- Arena: United Center

Results
- Record: 47–35 (.573)
- Place: Division: 3rd (Central); Conference: 5th (Eastern)
- Playoff finish: Conference semifinals (lost to Magic 2–4)
- Stats at Basketball Reference

Local media
- Television: WGN-TV; SportsChannel Chicago
- Radio: WMAQ

The 1994–95 Chicago Bulls season was the 29th season for the Chicago Bulls in the National Basketball Association.

== Season summary ==
=== Off-season ===
For the season, the Bulls moved into their new arena known as the United Center. During the off-season, the team signed free agents Ron Harper, and Jud Buechler.

=== Regular season ===
With the addition of Harper, the Bulls struggled playing around .500 in winning percentage for the first half of the regular season, holding a 23–25 record at the All-Star break. However, there were rumors that retired All-Star guard Michael Jordan would come out of his retirement to rejoin the team, after an unsuccessful baseball career. The Bulls received a major boost upon Jordan's return, as he faxed a memo that simply said "I'm back"; he also changed his jersey number to #45. The Bulls won 24 of their final 34 games of the season, which included two six-game winning streaks between March and April, and finished in third place in the Central Division with a 47–35 record, earning the fifth seed in the Eastern Conference; the team qualified for the NBA playoffs for the eleventh consecutive year.

Jordan averaged 26.9 points, 6.9 rebounds, 5.3 assists and 1.8 steals per game in 17 games, but only shot just .411 in field-goal percentage, while Scottie Pippen averaged 21.4 points, 8.1 rebounds, 5.2 assists and 2.9 steals per game, led the Bulls with 109 three-point field goals, and was named to the All-NBA First Team, and to the NBA All-Defensive First Team. In addition, second-year forward Toni Kukoč provided the team with 15.7 points, 5.4 rebounds and 4.6 assists per game, while B.J. Armstrong provided with 14.0 points per game and 108 three-point field goals, three-point specialist Steve Kerr contributed 8.2 points per game and shot .524 in three-point field goal percentage off the bench, and Will Perdue averaged 8.0 points and 6.7 rebounds per game. Meanwhile, Harper played a limited role and only contributed 6.9 points per game, Luc Longley averaged 6.5 points and 4.8 rebounds per game, Bill Wennington provided with 5.0 points and 2.6 rebounds per game, and Pete Myers contributed 4.5 points per game.

During the NBA All-Star weekend at the America West Arena in Phoenix, Arizona, Pippen was selected for the 1995 NBA All-Star Game, as a member of the Eastern Conference All-Star team, while Kerr participated in the NBA Three-Point Shootout for the second consecutive year. Pippen finished in seventh place in Most Valuable Player voting, while Jordan finished in eleventh place; Pippen also finished in second place in Defensive Player of the Year voting, behind Dikembe Mutombo of the Denver Nuggets.

The Bulls finished second in the NBA in home-game attendance behind the Charlotte Hornets, with an attendance of 926,218 at the United Center during the regular season.

=== NBA playoffs ===
In the Eastern Conference First Round of the 1995 NBA playoffs, the Bulls faced off against the 4th–seeded Hornets, who were led by the trio of All-Star center Alonzo Mourning, All-Star forward Larry Johnson, and Muggsy Bogues. The Bulls won Game 1 over the Hornets on the road in overtime, 108–100 at the Charlotte Coliseum, in which Jordan scored 48 points, but then lost Game 2 on the road, 106–89. With the series tied at 1–1, the Bulls won the next two games at home, which included a Game 4 win over the Hornets at the United Center, 85–84 to win the series in four games.

In the Eastern Conference Semi-finals, the team faced off against the top–seeded, and Atlantic Division champion Orlando Magic, who were led by the All-Star trio of Shaquille O'Neal, second-year star Penny Hardaway, and former Bulls forward Horace Grant. During the series, Jordan changed his jersey number back to #23, which caused controversy. With the series tied at 2–2, the Bulls lost Game 5 to the Magic on the road, 103–95 at the Orlando Arena, and then lost Game 6 at the United Center, 108–102, thus losing the series in six games.

The Magic would advance to the NBA Finals for the first time in franchise history, but would lose to the 6th–seeded, and defending NBA champion Houston Rockets in a four-game sweep in the 1995 NBA Finals.

=== Notable highlights ===
One notable highlight of the regular season occurred on March 28, 1995, in which the Bulls defeated the New York Knicks on the road, 113–111 at Madison Square Garden. Jordan scored a season-high of 55 points, as he made 21 of 37 field-goal attempts, 3 of 4 three-point field-goal attempts, and 10 of 11 free-throw attempts; it would later on be known as the "Double Nickel" game.

=== Aftermath ===
Following the season, Armstrong was left unprotected in the 1995 NBA expansion draft, where he was selected by the Toronto Raptors expansion team, while Perdue was traded to the San Antonio Spurs, and Myers was released to free agency.

== Draft picks ==
Round	Pick	Player	Position	Nationality	College / Team
1	21	Dickey Simpkins	PF	United States	Providence
2	49	Kris Bruton	SF	United States	Benedict

== Roster ==
1994–95 Chicago Bulls roster
Players

Pos.	No.	Player	Height	Weight	DOB	From
G	10	BJ Armstrong	6 ft 2 in (1.88 m)	185 lb (84 kg)	1967–09–09	Iowa
F	44	Corie Blount	6 ft 9 in (2.06 m)	240 lb (109 kg)	1969–01–04	Cincinnati
F	30	Jud Buechler	6 ft 6 in (1.98 m)	220 lb (100 kg)	1968–06–19	Arizona
G	3	Jo Jo English	6 ft 4 in (1.93 m)	195 lb (88 kg)	1970–02–04	South Carolina
G	9	Ron Harper	6 ft 6 in (1.98 m)	185 lb (84 kg)	1964–01–20	Miami (OH)
G	45 – 23	Michael Jordan	6 ft 6 in (1.98 m)	215 lb (98 kg)	1963–02–17	North Carolina
G	25	Steve Kerr	6 ft 3 in (1.91 m)	180 lb (82 kg)	1965–09–27	Arizona
F	42	Larry Krystkowiak (injured)	6 ft 9 in (2.06 m)	220 lb (100 kg)	1964–09–23	Montana
F	7	Toni Kukoč	6 ft 10 in (2.08 m)	192 lb (87 kg)	1968–09–18	Croatia
C	13	Luc Longley	7 ft 2 in (2.18 m)	265 lb (120 kg)	1969–01–19	New Mexico
G	20	Pete Myers	6 ft 6 in (1.98 m)	180 lb (82 kg)	1963–09–15	Little Rock
C	32	Will Perdue	7 ft 0 in (2.13 m)	240 lb (109 kg)	1965–08–29	Vanderbilt
F	33	Scottie Pippen	6 ft 8 in (2.03 m)	228 lb (103 kg)	1965–09–25	Central Arkansas
F	8	Dickey Simpkins	6 ft 9 in (2.06 m)	248 lb (112 kg)	1972–04–06	Providence
C	34	Bill Wennington	7 ft 0 in (2.13 m)	245 lb (111 kg)	1963–04–26	St. John's

Coaches
Head coach
- Phil Jackson
Assistant(s)
- Jim Cleamons
- Jimmy Rodgers
- Tex Winter

Legend
- (DP) Unsigned draft pick
- (FA) Free agent
- (S) Suspended
- Injured

Roster
Updated: December 12, 1994

== Regular season ==
=== Season standings ===
Central Division	W	L	PCT	GB	Home	Road	Div
y-Indiana Pacers	52	30	.634	–	33–8	19–22	18–10
x-Charlotte Hornets	50	32	.610	2	29–12	21–20	17–11
x-Chicago Bulls	47	35	.573	5	28–13	19–22	16–12
x-Cleveland Cavaliers	43	39	.524	9	26–15	17–24	17–11
x-Atlanta Hawks	42	40	.512	10	24–17	18–23	9–19
Milwaukee Bucks	34	48	.415	18	22–19	12–29	13–15
Detroit Pistons	28	54	.341	24	22–19	6–35	8–20

#	Eastern Conference				
#	Team	W	L	PCT	GB
1	c-Orlando Magic	57	25	.695	–
2	y-Indiana Pacers	52	30	.634	5
3	x-New York Knicks	55	27	.671	2
4	x-Charlotte Hornets	50	32	.610	7
5	x-Chicago Bulls	47	35	.573	10
6	x-Cleveland Cavaliers	43	39	.524	14
7	x-Atlanta Hawks	42	40	.512	15
8	x-Boston Celtics	35	47	.427	22
9	Milwaukee Bucks	34	48	.415	23
10	Miami Heat	32	50	.390	25
11	New Jersey Nets	30	52	.366	27
12	Detroit Pistons	28	54	.341	29
13	Philadelphia 76ers	24	58	.293	33
14	Washington Bullets	21	61	.256	36

=== Game log ===
1994–95 game log
Total: 47–35 (home: 28–13; road: 19–22)
November: 7–6 (home: 3–2; road: 4–4)

Game	Date	Team	Score	High points	High rebounds	High assists	Location Attendance	Record
1	November 4	Charlotte	W 89–83	Scottie Pippen (22)	Will Perdue (12)	Ron Harper (6)	United Center; 22,313	1–0
2	November 5	Washington	L 100–99 (OT)	Scottie Pippen (29)	Scottie Pippen (14)	Scottie Pippen (6)	United Center; 22,186	1–1
3	November 7	Philadelphia	W 98–83	Toni Kukoč (28)	Scottie Pippen (10)	Scottie Pippen (5)	United Center; 22,122	2–1
4	November 9	@ New Jersey	L 110–109	Scottie Pippen (28)	Will Perdue (9)	Scottie Pippen (6)	Brendan Byrne Arena; 20,049	2–2
5	November 11	@ Minnesota	W 112–100	Scottie Pippen (22)	Perdue, Pippen (8)	Kukoč, Pippen (5)	Target Center; 15,109	3–2
6	November 12	Dallas	L 124–120	Scottie Pippen (26)	Will Perdue (12)	Scottie Pippen (5)	United Center; 22,195	3–3
7	November 16	@ San Antonio	W 94–92	Ron Harper (27)	Scottie Pippen (7)	Scottie Pippen (9)	Alamodome; 16,059	4–3
8	November 17	@ Houston	L 106–83	Scottie Pippen (15)	Pippen, Wennington (6)	Scottie Pippen (6)	The Summit; 16,199	4–4
9	November 19	@ Dallas	W 111–85	Scottie Pippen (36)	Scottie Pippen (14)	Toni Kukoč (5)	Reunion Arena; 17,502	5–4
10	November 22	@ L.A. Clippers	W 105–93	Ron Harper (21)	Scottie Pippen (8)	Scottie Pippen (10)	Los Angeles Memorial Sports Arena; 9,080	6–4
11	November 23	@ Denver	L 113–111	Scottie Pippen (29)	Foster, Wennington (6)	B.J. Armstrong (5)	McNichols Sports Arena; 17,171	6–5
12	November 25	@ Utah	L 124–94	Scottie Pippen (15)	Dickey Simpkins (7)	Armstrong, Pippen (4)	Delta Center; 19,911	6–6
13	November 30	@ Phoenix	W 118–105	Scottie Pippen (35)	Scottie Pippen (9)	Myers, Pippen (6)	America West Arena; 22,414	7–6

December: 8–7 (home: 5–5; road: 3–2)

Game	Date	Team	Score	High points	High rebounds	High assists	Location Attendance	Record

January: 7–8 (home: 5–4; road: 2–4)

Game	Date	Team	Score	High points	High rebounds	High assists	Location Attendance	Record
39	January 22; 12 Noon CST	Houston	W 100–81	Armstrong (20)	Perdue (11)	Pippen (6)	United Center; 22,647	20–19

February: 5–8 (home: 3–0; road: 2–8)

Game	Date	Team	Score	High points	High rebounds	High assists	Location Attendance	Record
All-Star Break

March: 11–4 (home: 6–2; road: 5–2)

Game	Date	Team	Score	High points	High rebounds	High assists	Location Attendance	Record

April: 9–2 (home: 6–0; road: 3–2)

Game	Date	Team	Score	High points	High rebounds	High assists	Location Attendance	Record

1994–95 schedule

== Playoffs ==
1995 playoff game log
First Round: 3–1 (home: 2–0; road: 1–1)

Game	Date	Team	Score	High points	High rebounds	High assists	Location Attendance	Series
1	April 28	@ Charlotte	W 108–100 (OT)	Michael Jordan (48)	Michael Jordan (9)	Toni Kukoč (9)	Charlotte Coliseum; 23,859	1–0
2	April 30	@ Charlotte	L 89–106	Michael Jordan (32)	Scottie Pippen (8)	Michael Jordan (7)	Charlotte Coliseum; 23,859	1–1
3	May 2	Charlotte	W 103–80	Michael Jordan (25)	Jordan, Perdue (6)	Scottie Pippen (9)	United Center; 24,114	2–1
4	May 4	Charlotte	W 85–84	Jordan, Pippen (24)	Toni Kukoč (11)	Scottie Pippen (6)	United Center; 24,221	3–1

Conference semifinals: 2–4 (home: 1–2; road: 1–2)

Game	Date	Team	Score	High points	High rebounds	High assists	Location Attendance	Series
1	May 7	@ Orlando	L 91–94	Michael Jordan (19)	Scottie Pippen (10)	Jordan, Pippen (7)	Orlando Arena; 16,010	0–1
2	May 10	@ Orlando	W 104–94	Michael Jordan (38)	Kukoč, Perdue (8)	Scottie Pippen (5)	Orlando Arena; 16,010	1–1
3	May 12	Orlando	L 101–110	Michael Jordan (40)	Scottie Pippen (12)	Toni Kukoč (7)	United Center; 24,281	1–2
4	May 14	Orlando	W 106–95	Michael Jordan (26)	Jordan, Pippen (7)	Toni Kukoč (9)	United Center; 24,358	2–2
5	May 16	@ Orlando	L 95–103	Michael Jordan (39)	Scottie Pippen (11)	Toni Kukoč (6)	Orlando Arena; 16,010	2–3
6	May 18	Orlando	L 102–108	Scottie Pippen (26)	Scottie Pippen (12)	Michael Jordan (7)	United Center; 24,322	2–4

1995 schedule

== Player statistics ==
Legend
GP	Games played	GS	Games started	MPG	Minutes per game
FG%	Field-goal percentage	3P%	3-point field-goal percentage	FT%	Free-throw percentage
RPG	Rebounds per game	APG	Assists per game	SPG	Steals per game
BPG	Blocks per game	PPG	Points per game

=== Regular season ===
Player	GP	GS	MPG	FG%	3P%	FT%	RPG	APG	SPG	BPG	PPG
B.J. Armstrong	82	82	31.4	.468	.427	.884	2.3	3.0	1.0	0.1	14.0
Corie Blount	68	9	13.1	.476	.000	.567	3.5	0.9	0.4	0.5	3.5
Jud Buechler	57	0	10.6	.492	.313	.564	1.7	0.9	0.4	0.2	3.8
Jo Jo English	8	0	15.9	.385	.250	.769	0.4	0.9	0.9	0.1	5.4
Greg Foster	17	3	17.6	.477	.000	.710	3.2	0.9	0.1	0.5	6.1
Ron Harper	77	53	19.9	.426	.282	.618	2.3	2.0	1.3	0.4	6.9
Michael Jordan	17	17	39.3	.411	.500	.801	6.9	5.3	1.8	0.8	26.9
Steve Kerr	82	0	22.4	.527	.524	.778	1.5	1.8	0.5	0.0	8.2
Larry Krystkowiak	19	14	15.1	.389	.000	.900	3.1	1.4	0.5	0.1	4.4
Toni Kukoč	81	55	31.9	.504	.313	.748	5.4	4.6	1.3	0.2	15.7
Luc Longley	55	0	18.2	.447	.000	.822	4.8	1.3	0.4	0.8	6.5
Pete Myers	71	14	17.9	.415	.256	.614	2.0	2.1	0.8	0.2	4.5
Will Perdue	78	78	20.4	.553	.000	.582	6.7	1.2	0.3	0.7	8.0
Scottie Pippen	79	79	38.2	.480	.345	.716	8.1	5.2	2.9	1.1	21.4
Dickey Simpkins	59	5	9.9	.424	.000	.694	2.6	0.6	0.2	0.1	3.5
Bill Wennington	73	1	13.1	.492	.000	.810	2.6	0.5	0.3	0.2	5.0

=== Playoffs ===
Player	GP	GS	MPG	FG%	3P%	FT%	RPG	APG	SPG	BPG	PPG
B.J. Armstrong	10	10	28.8	.456	.448	.818	1.8	2.7	0.6	0.0	10.3
Corie Blount	8	0	2.5	.000	.000	.000	0.6	0.0	0.0	0.0	0.0
Jud Buechler	10	0	10.4	.429	.000	.500	2.0	0.5	0.4	0.3	2.0
Ron Harper	6	0	6.7	.429	.000	.000	1.0	0.7	0.5	0.2	2.0
Michael Jordan	10	10	42.0	.484	.367	.810	6.5	4.5	2.3	1.4	31.5
Steve Kerr	10	0	19.3	.475	.421	1.000	0.6	1.5	0.1	0.0	5.1
Toni Kukoč	10	10	37.2	.477	.438	.692	6.8	5.7	1.0	0.2	13.8
Luc Longley	10	8	20.4	.480	.000	.800	3.2	1.1	0.7	0.5	5.6
Pete Myers	9	0	8.8	.357	.500	.333	1.1	0.9	0.4	0.1	1.4
Will Perdue	10	2	17.6	.514	.000	.571	4.8	0.6	0.1	0.3	5.0
Scottie Pippen	10	10	39.6	.443	.368	.676	8.6	5.8	1.4	1.0	17.8
Bill Wennington	10	0	13.3	.412	.000	1.000	2.8	0.3	0.3	0.3	4.8

Player statistics citation:

== Awards and records ==
- Scottie Pippen, All-NBA First Team
- Scottie Pippen, NBA All-Defensive First Team

=== NBA All-Star Game ===
- Scottie Pippen, Forward
