= Mark West =

Mark West may refer to:

== Places in the United States ==
- Mark West, California, an unincorporated community in Sonoma County
- Mark West Creek, a stream in Sonoma County
- Mark West Springs, California, an unincorporated area in Sonoma County

== People ==
- Mark West (basketball) (born 1960), American basketball player
- Mark West (footballer) (born 1973), Australian footballer
- William Marcus West, Scottish American pioneer noted in Sonoma County, California, USA
- Mark D. West (born 1968), legal scholar
