= Charles Smith (basketball, born 1965) =

American basketball player (born 1965)

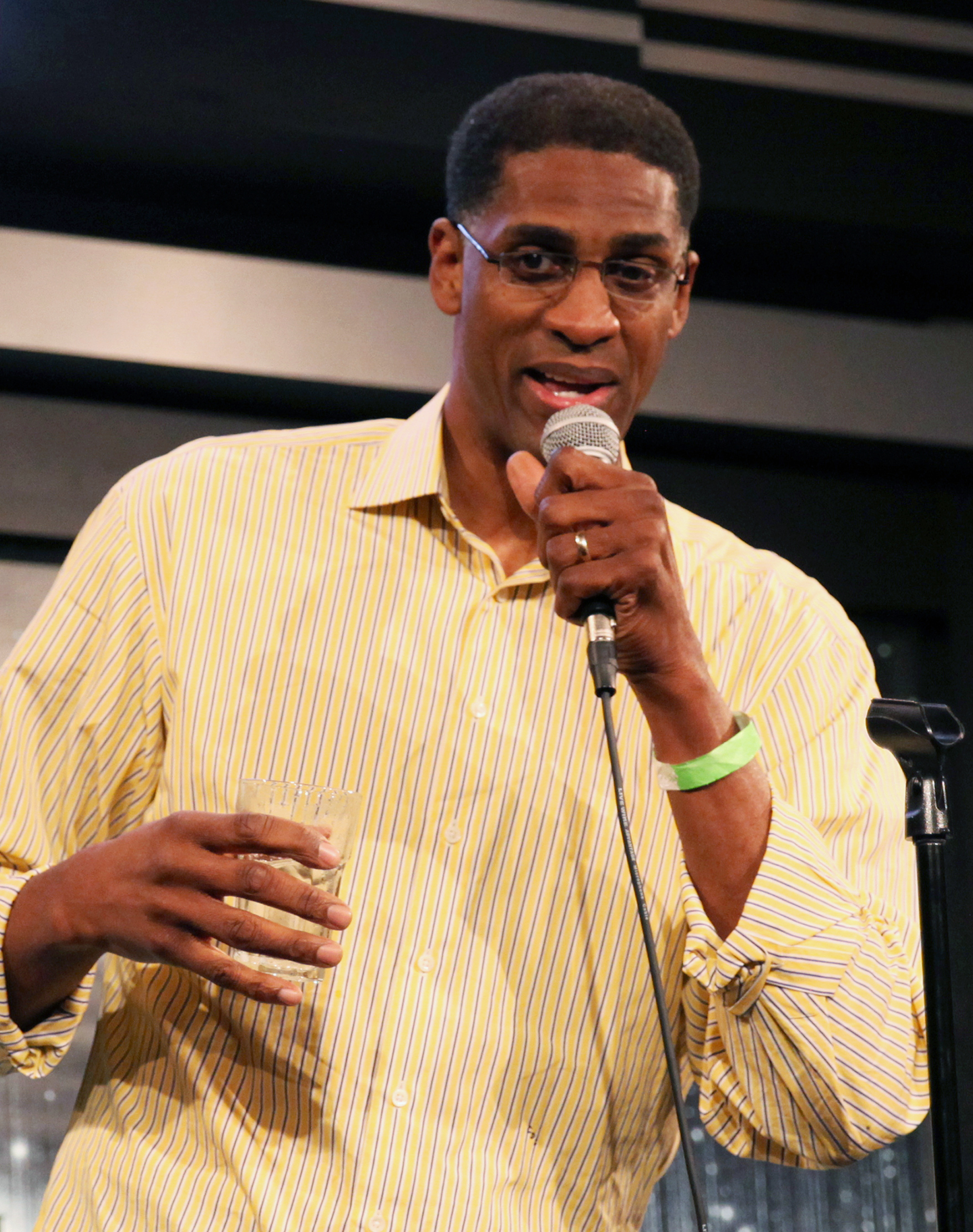
- Smith performing "Comedy for Cancer", 2016

Personal information
- Born: July 16, 1965 (age 61) Bridgeport, Connecticut, U.S.
- Listed height: 6 ft 10 in (2.08 m)
- Listed weight: 244 lb (111 kg)

Career information
- High school: Warren Harding (Bridgeport, Connecticut)
- College: Pittsburgh (1984–1988)
- NBA draft: 1988: 1st round, 3rd overall pick
- Drafted by: Philadelphia 76ers
- Playing career: 1988–1998
- Position: Power forward
- Number: 54, 6

Career history
- 1988–1992: Los Angeles Clippers
- 1992–1996: New York Knicks
- 1996–1998: San Antonio Spurs

Career highlights
- NBA All-Rookie First Team (1989); Second-team All-American – NABC (1988); Big East Player of the Year (1988); 2× First-team All-Big East (1987, 1988); 2× Third-team All-Big East (1985, 1986); No. 32 retired by Pittsburgh Panthers; First-team Parade All-American (1984); McDonald's All-American (1984)

Career NBA statistics
- Points: 8,107 (14.4 ppg)
- Rebounds: 3,246 (5.8 rpg)
- Assists: 798 (1.4 apg)
- Stats at NBA.com
- Stats at Basketball Reference
Medals
Men's basketball
Representing United States
Summer Olympics
Bronze medal – third place	1988 Seoul	National team
FIBA World Championship
Gold medal – first place	1986 Spain	National team

Charles Daniel Smith (born July 16, 1965) is an American former professional basketball player who played in the National Basketball Association (NBA) from 1988 to 1998. He was an All-American college player for the Pittsburgh Panthers. He led the 1986 World Games USA Team in scoring to win the Gold Medal and Olympic bronze medal as a member of the United States national team in 1988.

== College career ==
As a college player, Smith was named Big East Player of the Year in 1988. He was a member of the University of Pittsburgh's highly touted five-man recruiting class considered the country's best. Along with power forward Jerome Lane, Smith and the Pitt Basketball Team became a major force in college basketball, opening the 1987–88 season ranked No. 4 nationally and rising as high as No. 2. during Smith's tenure.

He played and led the US national team in scoring during the 1986 FIBA World Championship, where he won the gold medal, and at the 1988 Olympics, where he finished with a bronze.

== NBA career ==
After his college career, the 6'10", 245 lb. power forward was selected third overall in the 1988 NBA draft by the Philadelphia 76ers but immediately traded to the Los Angeles Clippers. He made the 1988 NBA All-Rookie Team by averaging 16 points and 8 rebounds. During his four years with the Clippers he was the team's top scorer averaging 19 points per game. He was later traded to the New York Knicks with Doc Rivers and Bo Kimble for point guard Mark Jackson. Coach Pat Riley moved Smith from Power Forward to Small Forward to fill the hole left by Xavier McDaniel after the Knicks failed to re-sign him after their successful 1991–92 season. Smith's knees became problematic playing small forward around this time. As Smith's stats declined, he was traded to the San Antonio Spurs for J. R. Reid before retiring in 1998.

== Post-retirement ==
Smith is a Resource Board Member of Family Office Association developing global partnerships. Prior, he was Head of Sports & Entertainment MediaCom and Head of New Business for Midas Exchange, both owned by WPP/GroupM.

After retiring from the NBA, Smith served as Team Representative for the National Basketball Players Association (NBPA) and then as First Vice President. Smith helped create the NBPA Foundation, a non-profit to support retired players in need. Smith went on to serve as Executive Director of the National Basketball Retired Players Association (NBRPA). Smith produced and executed exhibition games featuring over 40 retired NBA players.

Smith was founder and CEO of New Media Technology Corp. The company was the first to develop and patent customizable applications for video ingestion in 1998.

Smith played in an exhibition game organized by Dennis Rodman in North Korea, which was depicted in the 2015 documentary film Dennis Rodman's Big Bang in Pyongyang.

== NBA career statistics ==
Legend
GP	Games played	GS	Games started	MPG	Minutes per game
FG%	Field goal percentage	3P%	3-point field goal percentage	FT%	Free throw percentage
RPG	Rebounds per game	APG	Assists per game	SPG	Steals per game
BPG	Blocks per game	PPG	Points per game	**Bold**	Career high

=== Regular season ===
Year	Team	GP	GS	MPG	FG%	3P%	FT%	RPG	APG	SPG	BPG	PPG
1988–89	L.A. Clippers	71	56	30.4	.495	.000	.725	6.5	1.5	1.0	1.3	16.3
1989–90	L.A. Clippers	78	**76**	35.0	**.520**	.083	**.794**	6.7	1.5	**1.1**	1.5	**21.1**
1990–91	L.A. Clippers	74	74	**36.5**	.469	.000	.793	**8.2**	**1.8**	**1.1**	**2.0**	20.0
1991–92	L.A. Clippers	49	25	26.7	.466	.000	.785	6.1	1.1	0.8	**2.0**	14.6
1992–93	New York	**81**	68	26.8	.469	.000	.782	5.3	**1.8**	0.6	1.2	12.4
1993–94	New York	43	21	25.7	.443	**.500**	.719	3.8	1.2	0.6	1.0	10.4
1994–95	New York	76	58	28.3	.471	.226	.792	4.3	1.6	0.6	1.3	12.7
1995–96	New York	41	4	21.7	.388	.133	.709	3.9	0.7	0.4	1.2	7.4
1995–96	San Antonio	32	30	25.8	.458	–	.767	6.3	1.1	1.0	0.9	9.6
1996–97	San Antonio	19	7	17.3	.405	.000	.769	3.4	0.7	0.7	1.2	4.6
Career		564	419	29.0	.475	.194	.774	5.8	1.4	0.8	1.4	14.4

=== Playoffs ===
Year	Team	GP	GS	MPG	FG%	3P%	FT%	RPG	APG	SPG	BPG	PPG
1992	L.A. Clippers	5	5	**29.6**	.393	–	**.933**	**5.6**	**1.8**	0.8	**2.4**	**11.6**
1993	New York	15	15	25.9	.471	–	.740	4.0	1.3	0.6	0.9	11.1
1994	New York	**25**	**18**	24.5	.480	.000	.729	3.8	1.0	0.5	1.0	8.8
1995	New York	11	11	27.5	**.537**	.000	.567	3.8	1.2	**1.2**	1.5	10.8
1996	San Antonio	10	8	16.5	.500	–	.375	3.7	1.0	0.7	1.0	5.1
Career		66	57	24.5	.481	.000	.705	4.0	1.2	0.7	1.2	9.3

== Filmography ==
Year	Title	Role	Notes	Ref
2012	The Other Dream Team	Himself	Documentary about the Lithuania men's national basketball team at the 1992 Summer Olympics.	
