= Kostas Totsios =

Greek basketball player

Kostas Totsios Κώστας Τότσιος
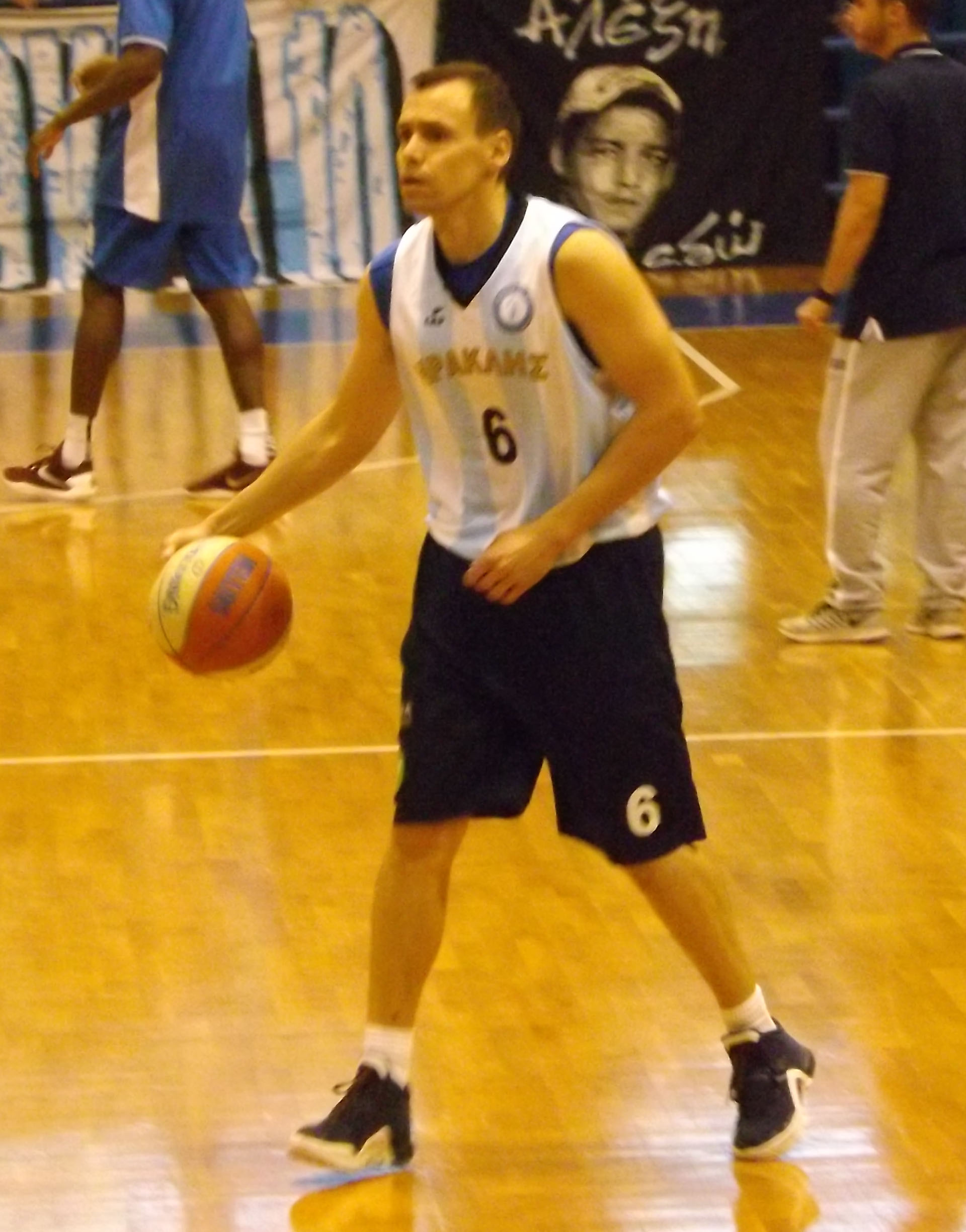
- Totsios playing for Iraklis in 2016.

Free agent
- Position: Shooting guard

Personal information
- Born: August 7, 1978 (age 48) Serres, Greece
- Listed height: 1.91 m (6 ft 3 in)

Career information
- Playing career: 1999–present

Career history
- 1999–2004: Olympia Larissa
- 2004–2005: GS Larissa
- 2005–2006: Makedonikos
- 2006–2007: Ionikos Lamias
- 2007–2009: Iraklis Thessaloniki
- 2009–2013: Ikaroi Serres
- 2013–2015: Kavala
- 2015–2016: Ethnikos Piraeus
- 2016–2018: Iraklis Thessaloniki

Career highlights
- Greek A2 all-time leading scorer; Greek 2nd Division champion (2015)

Konstantinos "Kostas" Totsios (Greek: Κώστας Τότσιος; born August 7, 1978) is a Greek professional basketball player who last played for Iraklis of the Greek A2 Basket League. Totsios has spent all of his career, except for two seasons, in the Greek A2, becoming the league's all-time leading scorer, while he was also the first player to reach the 400 games milestone in the league.

== Professional career ==
In the summer of 2005, Totsios signed for Kozani-based team Makedonikos of the Greek Basket League. Totsios became the all-time topscorer in the Greek A2 on 13 January 2013 as he scored 24 points against Pagrati, reaching a total of 4,937. A few weeks later, he surpassed the 5,000 points mark, as he scored 19 points against OFI. Totsios finished second in the voting for MVP of the 2014–15 Greek A2 behind Giannis Gagaloudis, and was eventually named in the league's first-team.

In the summer of 2015 Totsios signed with Ethnikos Piraeus. In June 2016, Totsios became the first player to appear in 400 games in the Greek A2 as he played for Ethnikos Piraeus against Promitheas Patras, while during the season he also surpassed 6,000 points. His effort during the season, earned him a spot in the second team of the Greek A2 League. In July 2016, Totsios agreed to terms with Iraklis Thessaloniki of the Greek A2.

== Career statistics ==
=== Greek Basket League ===
Legend
GP	Games played	GS	Games started	MPG	Minutes per game
FG%	Field goal percentage	3P%	3-point field goal percentage	FT%	Free throw percentage
RPG	Rebounds per game	APG	Assists per game	SPG	Steals per game
BPG	Blocks per game	PPG	Points per game	**Bold**	Career high

Led the league

Year	Team	GP	GS	MPG	FG%	3P%	FT%	RPG	APG	SPG	BPG	PPG
2002–03	Olympia Larissa	**25**	—	**18.0**	.477	.219	.667	**1.7**	**1.2**	**.3**	.0	**6.2**
2005–06	Makedonikos	23	—	12.2	**.540**	**.400**	**.714**	1.1	.3	.0	.0	3.9
Career		48	—	15.2	.497	.277	.683	1.4	.8	.2	.0	5.1
