= 1994–95 Washington Bullets season =

NBA professional basketball team season

- Head coach: Jim Lynam
- General manager: John Nash
- Owner: Abe Pollin
- Arena: USAir Arena (37 games); Baltimore Arena (4 games)

Results
- Record: 21–61 (.256)
- Place: Division: 7th (Atlantic); Conference: 14th (Eastern)
- Playoff finish: Did not qualify
- Stats at Basketball Reference

Local media
- Television: WDCA; Home Team Sports
- Radio: WTOP

The 1994–95 Washington Bullets season was the 34th season for the Washington Bullets in the National Basketball Association, and their 22nd season in Washington, D.C.

== Season summary ==
=== Off-season ===
The Bullets received the fifth overall pick in the 1994 NBA draft, and selected power forward Juwan Howard from the University of Michigan. During the off-season, the team acquired Scott Skiles from the Orlando Magic, and hired Jim Lynam as their new head coach. During the first month of the regular season, the Bullets traded Tom Gugliotta to the Golden State Warriors in exchange for Howard's former "Fab Five" teammate at Michigan, second-year star Chris Webber.

=== Regular season ===
Under Lynam and with the addition of Webber, Howard and Skiles, the Bullets won four of their first five games of the regular season, but continued to struggle losing 25 of their next 28 games, which included a ten-game losing streak, and held an 11–34 record at the All-Star break. At mid-season, things got worse as Kevin Duckworth dealt with continuing weight problems, and was suspended indefinitely after 40 games for not staying in physical condition, where he weighed over 310 lbs. The Bullets suffered a 13-game losing streak between March and April, and finished in last place in the Atlantic Division with a 21–61 record; the team missed the NBA playoffs for the seventh consecutive year.

Webber averaged 20.1 points, 9.6 rebounds, 4.7 assists, 1.5 steals and 1.6 blocks per game in 54 games, missing 19 games due to a shoulder injury, while Howard averaged 17.0 points and 8.4 rebounds per game, and was named to the NBA All-Rookie Second Team, and second-year guard Calbert Cheaney provided the team with 16.6 points per game. In addition, Rex Chapman contributed 16.2 points per game in only just 45 games due to groin and thumb injuries, while Skiles provided with 13.0 points and 7.3 assists per game, Don MacLean contributed 11.0 points per game, but only played just 39 games due to knee and thumb injuries, and second-year center Gheorghe Mureșan averaged 10.0 points, 6.7 rebounds and 1.7 blocks per game. Meanwhile, second-year guard Mitchell Butler contributed 7.9 points per game, while Duckworth averaged 7.1 points and 4.9 rebounds per game, and Doug Overton provided with 7.0 points and 3.0 assists per game. Undrafted rookie small forward Anthony Tucker averaged 3.9 points and 2.7 rebounds per game, but was released to free agency after 62 games, and shortly before the regular season had ended.

During the NBA All-Star weekend at the America West Arena in Phoenix, Arizona, Howard and Tucker were both selected for the NBA Rookie Game, as members of the Green team. Howard also finished tied in fifth place in Rookie of the Year voting, while Mureșan finished tied in third place in Most Improved Player voting. The Bullets finished eleventh in the NBA in home-game attendance, with an attendance of 689,463 at USAir Arena during the regular season.

=== Aftermath ===
Following the season, Chapman was traded to the Miami Heat, while Skiles signed as a free agent with the Philadelphia 76ers during the following season, and Duckworth was traded to the Milwaukee Bucks. Meanwhile, MacLean and Overton were both dealt to the Denver Nuggets, and Larry Stewart was left unprotected in the 1995 NBA expansion draft, where he was selected by the Vancouver Grizzlies expansion team.

== Draft picks ==
Round	Pick	Player	Position	Nationality	College
1	5	Juwan Howard	SF/PF	United States	Michigan
2	32	Jim McIlvaine	C	United States	Marquette

== Roster ==
1994–95 Washington Bullets roster
Players

Pos.	No.	Player	Height	Weight	DOB	From
G	32	Mitchell Butler	6 ft 5 in (1.96 m)	210 lb (95 kg)	1970-12-15	UCLA
G	3	Rex Chapman	6 ft 4 in (1.93 m)	185 lb (84 kg)	1967-10-05	Kentucky
G	40	Calbert Cheaney	6 ft 7 in (2.01 m)	209 lb (95 kg)	1971-07-17	Indiana
C	00	Kevin Duckworth (injured) (S)	7 ft 0 in (2.13 m)	275 lb (125 kg)	1964-04-01	Eastern Illinois
F	5	Juwan Howard	6 ft 9 in (2.06 m)	240 lb (109 kg)	1973-02-07	Michigan
F	34	Don MacLean	6 ft 10 in (2.08 m)	235 lb (107 kg)	1970-01-16	UCLA
C	22	Jim McIlvaine	7 ft 1 in (2.16 m)	240 lb (109 kg)	1972-07-30	Marquette
C	77	Gheorghe Mureșan	7 ft 7 in (2.31 m)	303 lb (137 kg)	1971-02-14	Romania
G	14	Doug Overton	6 ft 3 in (1.91 m)	190 lb (86 kg)	1969-08-03	La Salle
G	20	Brent Price (injured) (IN)	6 ft 1 in (1.85 m)	165 lb (75 kg)	1968-12-09	Oklahoma
G	4	Scott Skiles (injured)	6 ft 1 in (1.85 m)	180 lb (82 kg)	1964-03-05	Michigan State
F	33	Larry Stewart	6 ft 8 in (2.03 m)	220 lb (100 kg)	1968-09-21	Coppin State
F	15	Kenny Walker	6 ft 8 in (2.03 m)	210 lb (95 kg)	1964-08-18	Kentucky
F	2	Chris Webber	6 ft 9 in (2.06 m)	245 lb (111 kg)	1973-03-01	Michigan

Coaches
Head coach
- Jim Lynam
Assistant(s)
- Derek Smith
- Bob Staak

Legend
- (DP) Unsigned draft pick
- (FA) Free agent
- (S) Suspended
- (IN) Inactive
- Injured

Roster

=== Roster notes ===
- Center Kevin Duckworth was suspended indefinitely after playing 40 games, due to continuing weight problems and not maintaining playing shape.
- Point guard Brent Price was on the injured reserve list due to a knee injury, missed the entire regular season, and was waived on April 19, 1995.
- Rookie small forward Anthony Tucker was waived on April 19, 1995.

== Regular season ==
=== Season standings ===
Atlantic Division	W	L	PCT	GB	Home	Road	Div
c-Orlando Magic	57	25	.695	—	39–2	18–23	18–10
x-New York Knicks	55	27	.671	2	29–12	26–15	23–5
x-Boston Celtics	35	47	.427	22	20–21	15–26	14–14
Miami Heat	32	50	.390	25	22–19	10–31	9–19
New Jersey Nets	30	52	.366	27	20–21	10–31	13–15
Philadelphia 76ers	24	58	.293	33	14–27	10–31	12–16
Washington Bullets	21	61	.256	36	13–28	8–33	9–19

#	Eastern Conference				
#	Team	W	L	PCT	GB
1	c-Orlando Magic	57	25	.695	–
2	y-Indiana Pacers	52	30	.634	5
3	x-New York Knicks	55	27	.671	2
4	x-Charlotte Hornets	50	32	.610	7
5	x-Chicago Bulls	47	35	.573	10
6	x-Cleveland Cavaliers	43	39	.524	14
7	x-Atlanta Hawks	42	40	.512	15
8	x-Boston Celtics	35	47	.427	22
9	Milwaukee Bucks	34	48	.415	23
10	Miami Heat	32	50	.390	25
11	New Jersey Nets	30	52	.366	27
12	Detroit Pistons	28	54	.341	29
13	Philadelphia 76ers	24	58	.293	33
14	Washington Bullets	21	61	.256	36

z – clinched division title
y – clinched division title
x – clinched playoff spot

== Game log ==
=== Regular season ===
1994–95 game log
Total: 21–61 (Home: 13–28; Road: 8–33)
November: 4–7 (home: 2–4; road: 2–3)

Game	Date	Team	Score	High points	High rebounds	High assists	Location Attendance	Record

December: 3–12 (home: 1–4; road: 2–8)

Game	Date	Team	Score	High points	High rebounds	High assists	Location Attendance	Record
17	December 13, 1994; 8:30 p.m. EST	@ Houston	L 85–93	Webber (22)	Webber (16)	Skiles (5)	The Summit; 13,889	6–11

January: 4–10 (home: 3–6; road: 1–4)

Game	Date	Team	Score	High points	High rebounds	High assists	Location Attendance	Record

February: 2–11 (home: 1–6; road: 1–5)

Game	Date	Team	Score	High points	High rebounds	High assists	Location Attendance	Record
All-Star Break
48	February 17, 1995; 7:30 p.m. EST	Houston	L 92–109	Howard, Webber (20)	Webber (15)	Webber (7)	USAir Arena; 18,756	12–36

March: 5–11 (home: 3–5; road: 2–6)

Game	Date	Team	Score	High points	High rebounds	High assists	Location Attendance	Record

April: 3–9 (home: 3–3; road: 0–6)

Game	Date	Team	Score	High points	High rebounds	High assists	Location Attendance	Record

1994–95 schedule

== Player statistics ==
Legend
GP	Games played	GS	Games started	MPG	Minutes per game
FG%	Field-goal percentage	3P%	3-point field-goal percentage	FT%	Free-throw percentage
RPG	Rebounds per game	APG	Assists per game	SPG	Steals per game
BPG	Blocks per game	PPG	Points per game

=== Regular season ===
Player	GP	GS	MPG	FG%	3FG%	FT%	RPG	APG	SPG	BPG	PPG
Mitchell Butler	76	5	20.4	.421	.326	.665	2.2	1.2	.8	.1	7.9
Rex Chapman	45	29	32.6	.397	.314	.862	2.5	2.8	1.5	.3	16.2
Calbert Cheaney	78	71	34.0	.453	.339	.812	4.1	2.3	1.0	.3	16.6
Kevin Duckworth	40	22	20.5	.442	.200	.643	4.9	.5	.5	.6	7.1
Tom Gugliotta^{a}	6	6	37.7	.398	.500	.788	8.8	3.0	3.5	1.8	16.0
Juwan Howard	65	52	36.1	.489	.000	.664	8.4	2.5	.8	.2	17.0
Don MacLean	39	20	27.0	.438	.250	.765	4.2	1.3	.4	.1	11.0
Jim McIlvaine	55	0	9.7	.479	.000	.683	1.9	.2	.2	1.8	1.7
Gheorghe Mureșan	73	58	23.6	.560	.000	.709	6.7	.5	.7	1.7	10.0
Brian Oliver^{a}	6	0	7.0	.444	.000	.750	.7	.7	.0	.0	2.3
Doug Overton	82	20	20.8	.416	.424	.872	1.7	3.0	.6	.0	7.0
Scott Skiles	62	62	33.5	.455	.421	.886	2.6	7.3	1.1	.1	13.0
Larry Stewart	40	0	8.7	.461	.000	.667	1.7	.5	.4	.2	2.6
Anthony Tucker^{a}	62	13	15.8	.457	.000	.614	2.7	1.1	.7	.2	3.9
Kenny Walker	30	24	11.1	.429	.000	.750	2.0	0.3	0.2	0.2	2.4
Chris Webber	54	52	38.3	.495	.276	.502	9.6	4.7	1.5	1.6	20.1

^{a} Statistics with the Washington Bullets.

Player statistics citation:

== Awards and records ==
- Juwan Howard, NBA All-Rookie 2nd Team

== Transactions ==
=== Overview ===
Players Added

Via draft

- Juwan Howard
- Jim McIlvaine

Via free agency

- Anthony Tucker ^{[a]}
- Brian Oliver ^{[a]}^{[b]}

Via trade

- Scott Skiles
- Chris Webber
Players Lost

Via trade

- Michael Adams
- Tom Gugliotta

Via free agency

- Pervis Ellison
- Marty Conlon

Via waivers

- Brent Price

- ^{a} Later waived.
- ^{b} Signed for the rest of the season after a 10-day contract.

=== Trades ===
July 29, 1994	To Washington Bullets Scott Skiles Conditional 1996 first-round pick Conditional 1998 first-round pick	To Orlando Magic Conditional 1996 second-round pick Conditional 1998 first-round pick
August 2, 1994	To Washington Bullets Conditional 1996 second-round pick Conditional 1997 second-round pick	To Charlotte Hornets Michael Adams
November 17, 1994	To Washington Bullets Chris Webber	To Golden State Warriors Tom Gugliotta Conditional 1996 first-round pick Conditional 1998 first-round pick Conditional 2000 first-round pick

=== Free agents ===
==== Additions ====
Player	Signed	Former team
Anthony Tucker	October 5, 1994	N/A
Brian Oliver	October 5, 1994	Rockford Lightning (CBA)

==== Subtractions ====
Player	Left	New team
Pervis Ellison	August 1, 1994	Boston Celtics
Marty Conlon	August 3, 1994	Milwaukee Bucks

=== Waivings ===
Player	Left
Brian Oliver	November 18, 1994
Anthony Tucker	April 19, 1995
Brent Price	April 19, 1995

Player Transactions Citation:

== See also ==
- 1994–95 NBA season
