= Gioulekas =

Gioulekas is a surname. Notable people with the surname include:

- Sotirios Gioulekas
- Nikolaos Gioulekas
