= Vassilis Angelakopoulos =

Greek professional basketball player

Vassilis Angelakopoulos Βασίλης Αγγελακόπουλος
Mynokou
- Position: Power forward

Personal information
- Born: August 4, 1979 (age 47) Larissa, Greece
- Listed height: 2.03 m (6 ft 8 in)
- Listed weight: 109 kg (240 lb)

Career information
- Playing career: 1997–present

Career history
- 1997–2001: GS Larissa
- 2001–2004: Olympia Larissa
- 2004–2006: GS Larissa
- 2006–2007: Aigaleo
- 2007–2008: AEL
- 2008–2009: Kavala
- 2009–2010: Olympia Larissa
- 2010–2011: Iraklis
- 2012: AGO Rethymno
- 2012–2013: Trikala
- 2013–2015: Kavala
- 2015–2016: Psychiko
- 2016–2019: Iraklis
- 2020–present: Mynokou

Career highlights
- Greek 2nd Division champion (2015)

Vassilis Angelakopoulos (alternate spelling: Vasilis) (Greek: Βασίλης Αγγελακόπουλος, Greek pronunciation: [va'silis aŋɟela'kopylos]; born August 4, 1979) is a Greek professional basketball player who last played for Iraklis of the Greek Basket League. Born in Larissa, he started his professional career with GS Larissa. Angelakopoulos has also played for Olympia Larissa and AEL, appearing for all three professional basketball teams of his hometown. He has also played for several other teams in the first and second tier of Greek basketball.

== Professional career ==
Angelakopoulos started his professional career with GS Larissa, in 1997. In 2001, he moved to city rivals Olympia Larissa, with whom he played for 3 years. In 2004, he returned to GS Larissa for a second spell, before moving to Aigaleo for the 2006–07 season.

In August 2010, Angelakopoulos agreed to terms with Iraklis Thessaloniki, of the Greek Basket League. In March 2012, he agreed with AGO Rethymno, to play with the team for the remainder of the 2011–12 season. In the summer of 2013, Angelakopoulos signed with Kavala.

He was one of the main contributors of Trikala, in the 2012–13 Greek A2 League season, helping the team to win a league promotion to the Greek Basket League's next season. Although he expressed his desire to stay at Trikala, in September 2015, he signed with Psychiko. On 21 July 2016, Angelakopoulos agreed with Iraklis Thessaloniki, of the Greek A2 League, for a second term in the team.
