= Kostas Pilafidis =

Greek basketball coach and former player

Personal information
- Born: 15 February 1957 (age 69) Thessaloniki, Greece

Career history

Coaching
- 1998–2000: Iraklis (assistant)
- 2001–2002: Iraklis
- 2003: Ionikos Nea Filadelfeia
- 2004: Makedonikos
- 2005–2006: Gymnastikos Larissas
- 2006–2007: PAOK
- 2007–2008: AEL 1964
- 2008–2009: Kavala
- 2010: Iraklis

Kostas Pilafidis (Greek: Κώστας Πιλαφίδης; born 15 February 1957) is a Greek former basketball player and basketball coach. Born in Thessaloniki, he played for Iraklis before beginning a coaching career that included head coaching spells with Iraklis, Ionikos Nea Filadelfeia, Makedonikos, Gymnastikos Larissas, PAOK, AEL 1964 and Kavala.

Pilafidis is particularly associated with the early development of Dimitris Diamantidis. He coached Diamantidis as a teenager in Kastoria and later recommended him to Iraklis, where Diamantidis began his professional career.

== Early life and playing career ==
Pilafidis was born on 15 February 1957 in Thessaloniki. He began his basketball career in 1972 with Iraklis and later played for Dimokritos and AS Pera. He was also a member of the Greek youth national team and the Greek Armed Forces national team.

== Coaching career ==
=== Early coaching career and Dimitris Diamantidis ===
Pilafidis' early coaching career included spells with Asteras Ippodromiou, PAOD, Olympia Larissa and MAE Kastoria. During his time in Kastoria, he worked with a young Dimitris Diamantidis and played an important role in his early development.

Pilafidis later recalled that Diamantidis initially stood out for his understanding of the game, physical characteristics and court awareness rather than his technical development. He came to view him as a player capable of developing into a tall playmaker.

Pilafidis subsequently joined Iraklis as a member of Dragan Šakota's coaching staff. He recommended Diamantidis to the Thessaloniki club, which acquired the player in 1999. His involvement was an important part of Diamantidis' transition from basketball in Kastoria to the professional level with Iraklis.

=== Iraklis ===
Pilafidis served on the coaching staff of Iraklis from 1998 to 2000, during Dragan Šakota's tenure as head coach.

He later returned as head coach during the 2001–02 season. Under Pilafidis, Iraklis finished fourth in the Greek championship, with a roster that included Nikos Hatzivrettas, Rod Blakney and Dimitris Diamantidis.

The club's performance earned qualification for European competition, although financial difficulties prevented Iraklis from taking the EuroLeague place it had earned.

Diamantidis was among the players coached by Pilafidis during the season, while Hatzivrettas finished as the league's leading scorer.

=== Ionikos Nea Filadelfeia and Makedonikos ===
During the 2003–04 Greek Basket League season, Pilafidis coached two different clubs. He began the season with Ionikos Nea Filadelfeia, recording three wins in eleven league games before leaving the club.

Later in the season, he took charge of Makedonikos, coaching the club in five league games and recording two wins and three losses.

=== Gymnastikos Larissas ===
Pilafidis became head coach of Gymnastikos Larissas for the 2005–06 season. The newly promoted team retained its place in the Greek top division under his leadership.

Among the players who joined Gymnastikos during his tenure was Jeremiah Massey, who subsequently developed into one of the notable foreign players in the Greek league.

Pilafidis received a vote in the ballot for the Greek League Coach of the Year award following the 2005–06 season.

=== PAOK ===
On 20 October 2006, PAOK appointed Pilafidis as head coach, replacing Bane Prelević, who moved into the position of general manager.

One of the most notable results of his tenure was PAOK's 101–99 double-overtime victory over local rivals Aris on 10 December 2006.

While coaching PAOK, Pilafidis was selected alongside Željko Obradović to coach the Greek players' selection at the 2007 Greek All-Star Game in Lamia.

The Greek selection included players such as Dimitris Diamantidis, Fragiskos Alvertis, Vassilis Spanoulis, Giannis Bourousis, Georgios Printezis and Sofoklis Schortsanitis.

Pilafidis resigned from PAOK in March 2007 and was succeeded by Vangelis Alexandris.

=== AEL 1964 ===
On 21 June 2007, Pilafidis was appointed head coach of AEL 1964, signing a two-year contract.

His tenure ended in February 2008 after his resignation was accepted and the two sides ended their cooperation.

=== Kavala ===
In August 2008, newly promoted Kavala appointed Pilafidis as head coach ahead of the club's first season in Greece's top division.

Pilafidis was given the task of establishing the newly promoted club in the top division and building a competitive roster for its first season at that level.

He received votes in the Greek League Coach of the Year ballot following the 2008–09 season.

Pilafidis remained with Kavala into the 2009–10 season before leaving the club in December 2009.

=== Return to Iraklis ===
On 3 August 2010, Pilafidis returned to Iraklis as head coach, eight years after his previous head coaching spell with the club. He succeeded Lefteris Kakiousis following the club's promotion back to the Greek top division.

Pilafidis resigned in early November 2010 and informed the players of his decision to leave the club.

== Later activities and recognition ==
In the years following his 2010 stint with Iraklis, Pilafidis continued to make public appearances within Greek basketball.

In January 2016, he was honoured by the Greek Basketball Coaches Association (SEPK) in Thessaloniki for his contribution to basketball.

Later that year, Pilafidis participated in the inauguration of the ESAKE section of the YMCA Thessaloniki Basketball Museum alongside other figures from Greek basketball. During the event, he discussed the development of professional basketball in Greece and the changes that had taken place since the introduction of professionalism.

On 28 January 2018, Pilafidis received another honorary distinction from the Basketball Clubs Association of Thessaloniki (EKASTH) during its annual event at the University of Macedonia.
