= Chris Roupas =

American basketball player

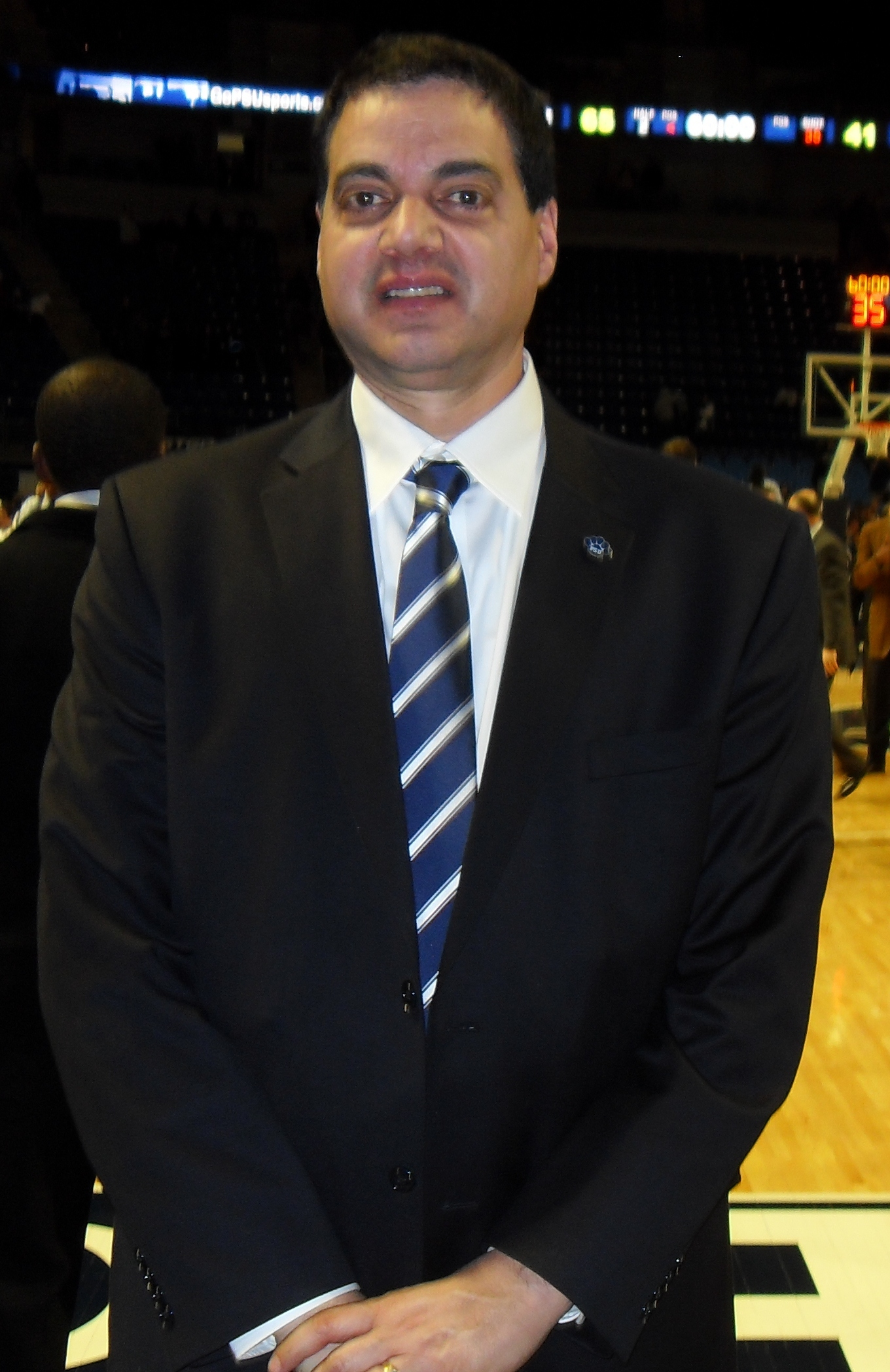
- Roupas at Penn State's Basketball Alumni Day, February 2011

Personal information
- Born: September 19, 1957 (age 69) York, Pennsylvania
- Listed height: 6 ft 5 in (1.96 m)
- Listed weight: 220 lb (100 kg)

Career information
- High school: Dallastown (Dallastown, Pennsylvania)
- College: Penn State York
- Playing career: 1982–1983
- Position: Shooting guard
- Number: 55, 12, 23, 30, 14

Career history
- 1982–1983: AEK Athens, GS Larissas, Aiolos (Greece)

Chris Roupas (born September 19, 1957) is an American former professional basketball player. A 6 ft 5 in, 220 pound shooting guard, he played for Aiolos in Athens, Greece during the 1982–83 season.

== Biography and career ==
Born in York, Pennsylvania, Roupas lettered his freshman and sophomore seasons for Head Coach Ron Trimmer in the Penn State Commonwealth Campus League at the Penn State York Campus in 1975 through 1977. At University Park, injuries at the start of his junior and senior years limited his playing. Not to be deterred from his injuries, Roupas helped the team out as a manager, record keeper, and practice body during his rehabilitation. Upon graduation in 1981, Roupas made a United States All-Star team composed of Greek-Americans sponsored by AHEPA. That team toured Greece in June 1982 where Roupas was spotted by Greek basketball coaches and asked to come back the following season and play professionally. Roupas is the first Penn State Nittany Lions Basketball Player to play professional basketball in Greece.

== Penn State University ==
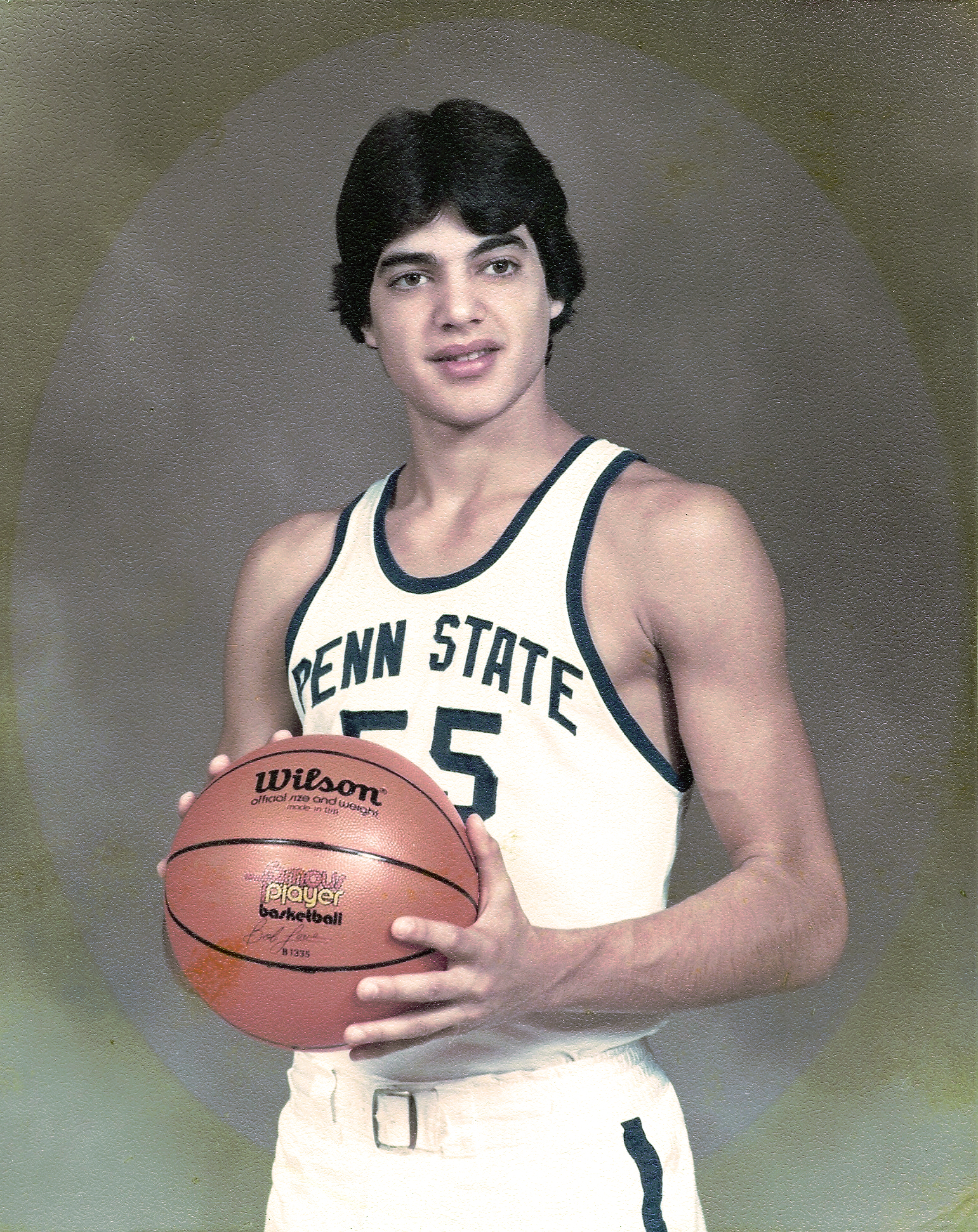
Roupas in 1975

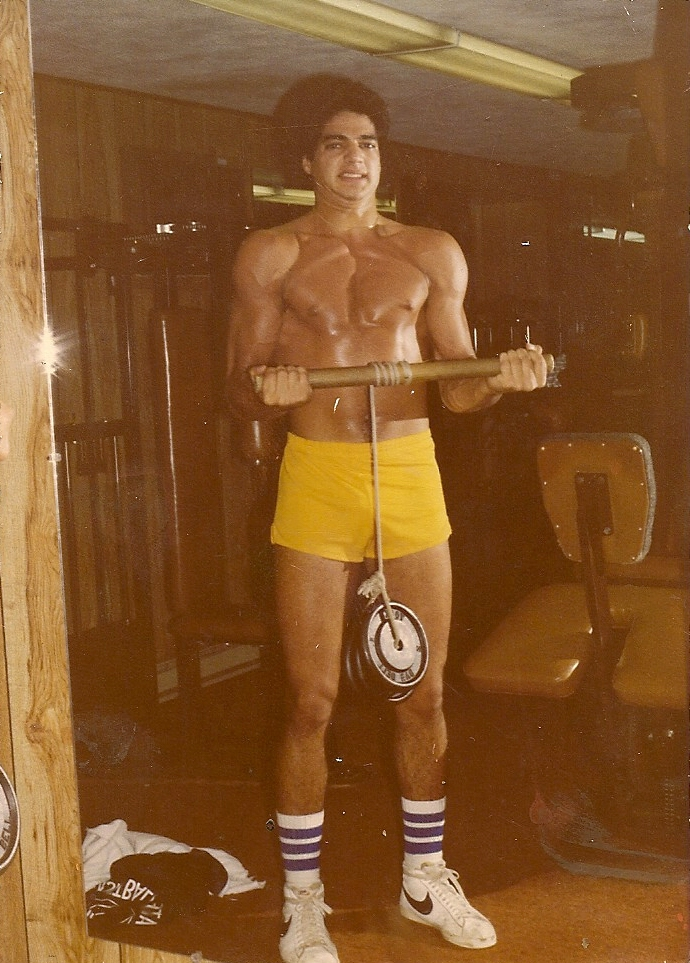
Penn State's Chris Roupas working out in the Nittany Lion's weight room in University Park, June 1979

In the 1975–76 Commonwealth Campus League Season at the Penn State York Campus, Roupas played in 12 games, averaging 3 points, 3.5 rebounds, and 2 assists at the small forward position while averaging ten minutes of action in each game as a freshman. In the 1976–77 season, Roupas played in all 18 games, averaging 6 points, 4 rebounds, and 3 assists. His most memorable three games first came on December 18, 1976, in his sophomore season, when Roupas came off the bench in the second half to hit 7 of 9 from the field and score fourteen points in just twelve minutes against Schuylkill to help preserve a 98–84 victory for the Nittany Lions. His next memorable game came on January 22, 1977, where in his first start against Allentown for the Penn State York Campus, Roupas scored 12 points in a 96–64 win for the Lions. Roupas continued his fine play the following week on January 29, 1977, when he scored 8 points coming off the bench at Delaware to help the Lions come from being down 9 points at the half to win 90–82 in front of a tough Delaware crowd. Despite limited action, Roupas had outstanding offensive statistics in his sophomore season with 108 points, making 45 out of 78 attempts from the field for 57.7%, and 18 out of 25 attempts from the free throw line for 72%. Roupas also was fourth on the team in rebounding with 72 rebounds. Trimmer called Roupas his most improved player from the year before with Roupas having the ability to provide instant offense when inserted into a game. Now as an alumnus, Roupas stays very active with the Penn State basketball alumni, Penn State's Coaches Versus Cancer, and with the Penn State Nittany Lion Hoops Club which helps to promote, support, and encourage participation in the Penn State men's basketball program. Roupas also serves on the Board of Directors for Penn State's Kappa Delta Rho fraternity which is one of the largest fraternity houses at Penn State's University Park. .

== United States AHEPA All-Star basketball team ==
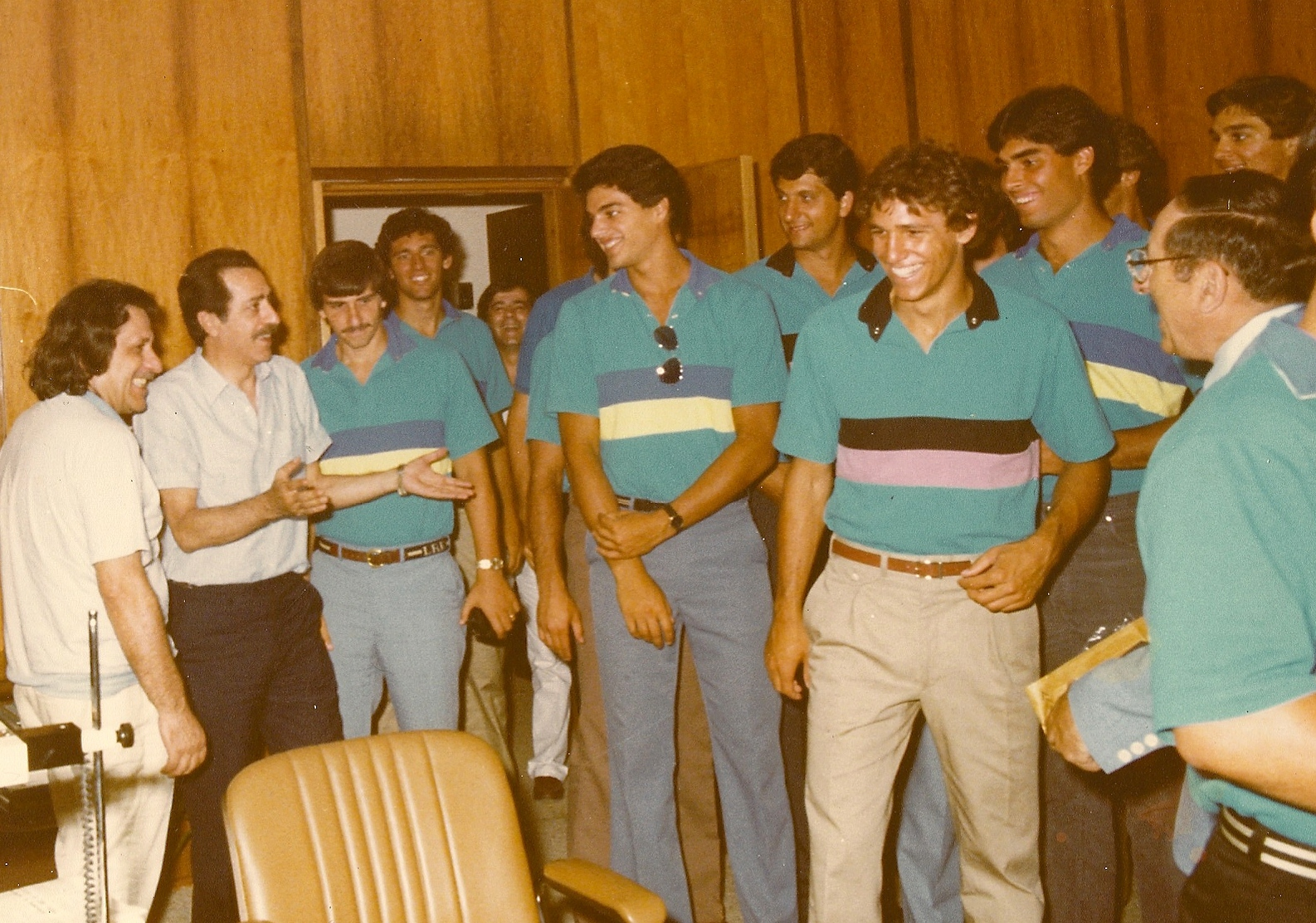
Roupas (sunglasses on shirt) with the 1982 USA-AHEPA All-Star Basketball Team in Greece.

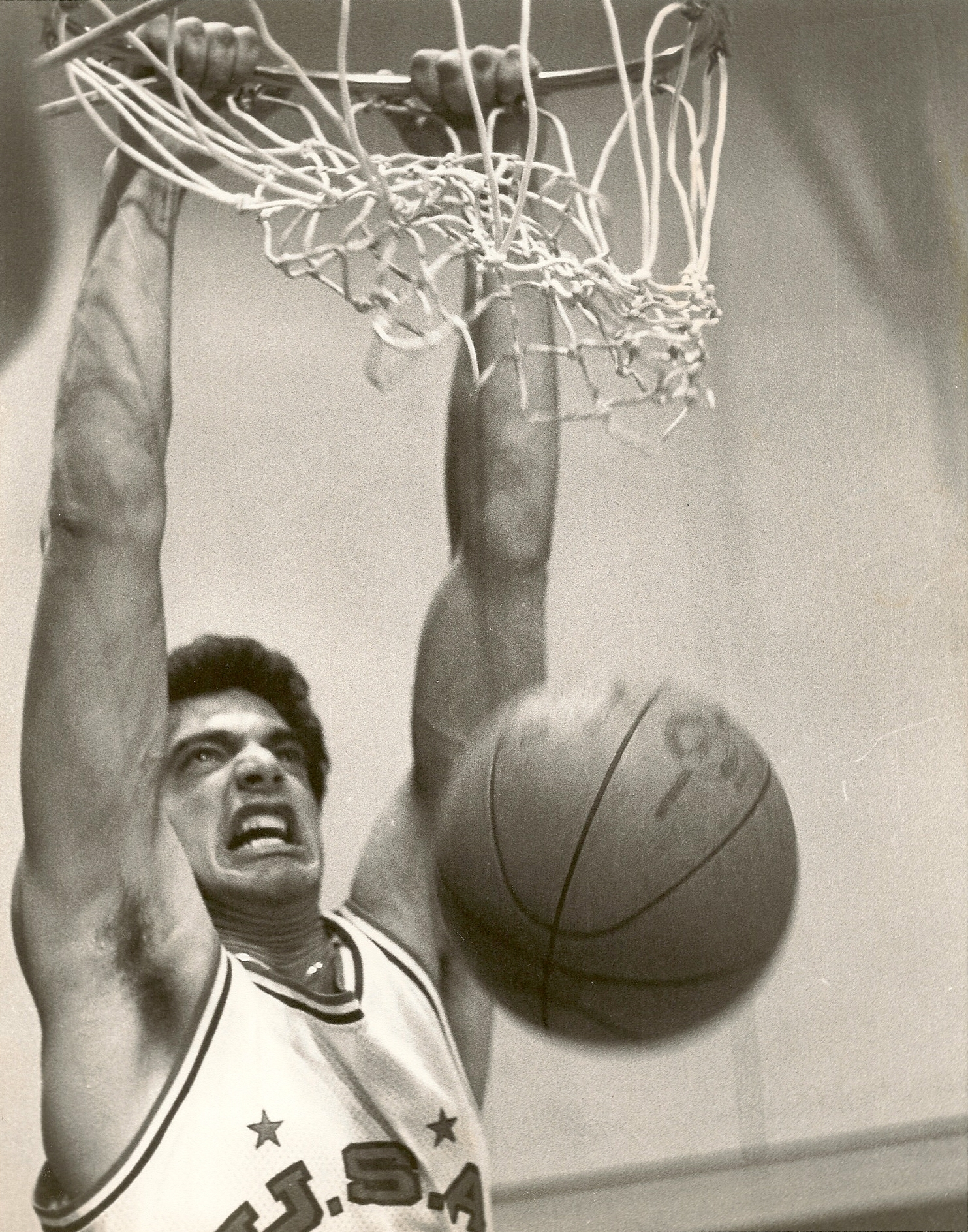
Chris Roupas 1982 USA-AHEPA All-Star

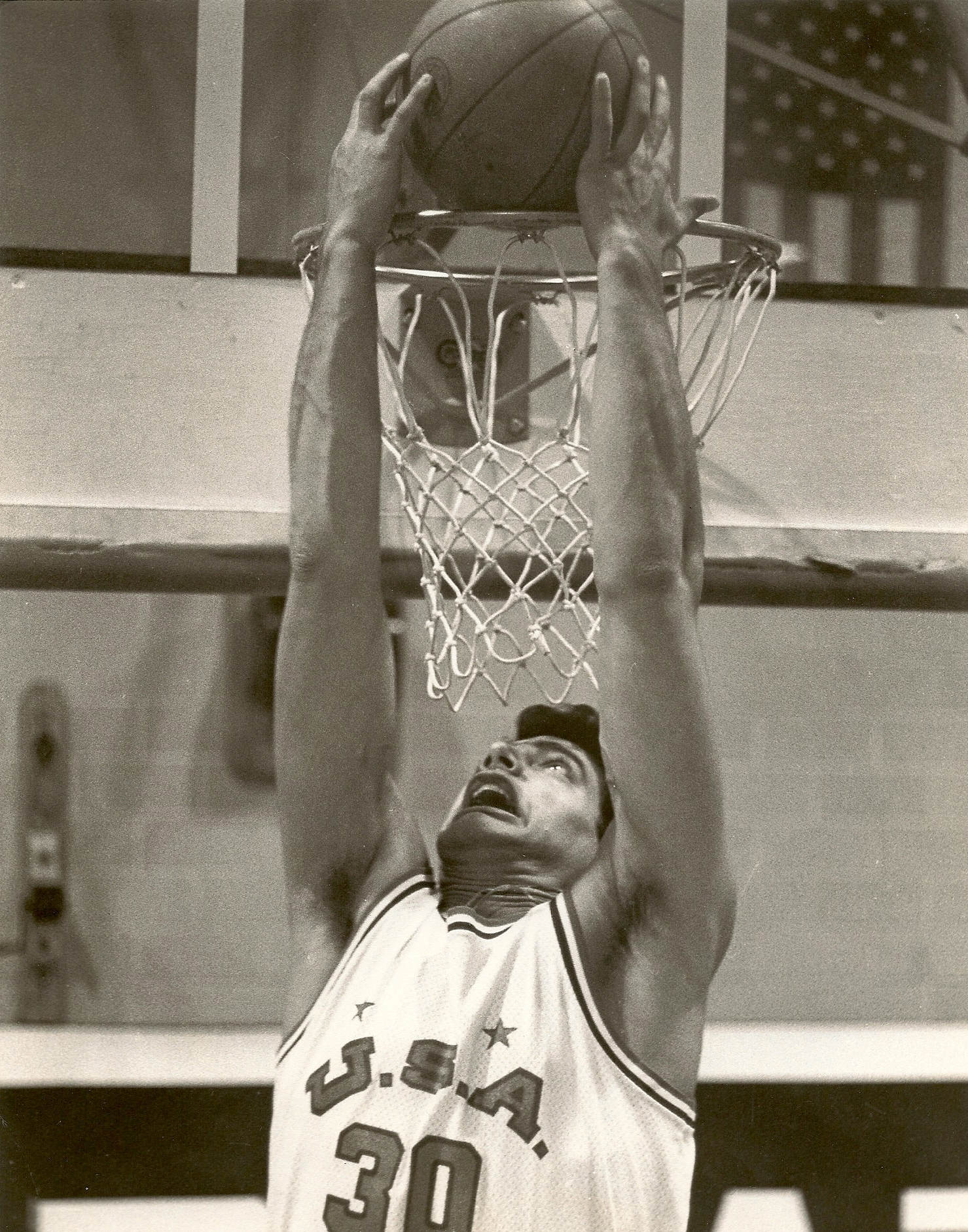
Chris Roupas 1982 USA-AHEPA All-Star

Touring Greece in June 1982 with the United States AHEPA All-Star team, Roupas started in 4 out of 10 games the United States-AHEPA All-Stars played in averaging 9 points, 4 rebounds, and 5 assists. Playing against the best teams Greece could put together at that time of the year which followed the Greek basketball season and playoffs, the all-stars beat Panathinaikos, Panionios, Panellinios, Kolossos Rodou, and the former Rethmyno now Rethymno Cretan Kings and Iraklio, Crete teams. They also beat Apollon Patras, and Olympiacos. They lost to AEK Athens, and PAOK. Because many of the Greek professional players were taking a break from their season and could not play against the AHEPA team, Greek basketball officials supplemented the Greek professional clubs with junior players and several notable Greek Basket League players from the A-league who traveled with the AHEPA team and played against them on the Greek team AHEPA was playing that day. Some of these players included Panagiotis Giannakis of Ionikos Nikaias B.C., Kyriakos Vidas of Panathinaikos B.C., Vassilis Goumas of AEK Athens, and Albert Mallach of Panellinios B.C. Giannakis and Mallach played in most of the games against the AHEPA team. These notable Greek players playing against the AHEPA team was coordinated by Greek basketball coach Michalis Kyritsis who coached many Greek basketball teams in his career including AEK in 1992 and Aris B.C. in 1990. Rounding out the 1982 USA-AHEPA All-Star team with Roupas was Chris Nikitas-Depaul University. Nikitas went on to play two years later alongside Nikos Galis with the Greek professional basketball team Aris. Tim Birtsas-Michigan State (Birtsas went on to win a World Series Championship in professional baseball pitching for the Cincinnati Reds in 1990 ), Terry Benka-Drake University, Dean Tsipis-Case Western, Tony Kazanas-Bowling Green State University, John Koutsoflakis-Hellenic College and Holy Cross Greek Orthodox School of Theology, Chris Tsiotis-Suffolk University, Peter Koclanes-Colorado School of Mines, Tom Papathakis-Chico State, Dan Nikitas-Saint Michael's College (Vermont), and Larry Kopczyk-Transylvania University. The All-Stars were coached by Dr. Monthe Kofos of Boston, Massachusetts, Spiros Siaggas of Reno, Nevada, and Judge Tom Yeotis of Flint, Michigan, with Clinician Dean Bouzeos of Chicago, Illinois, and Trainer George Petroleas of Detroit, Michigan.

== Greek professional basketball ==
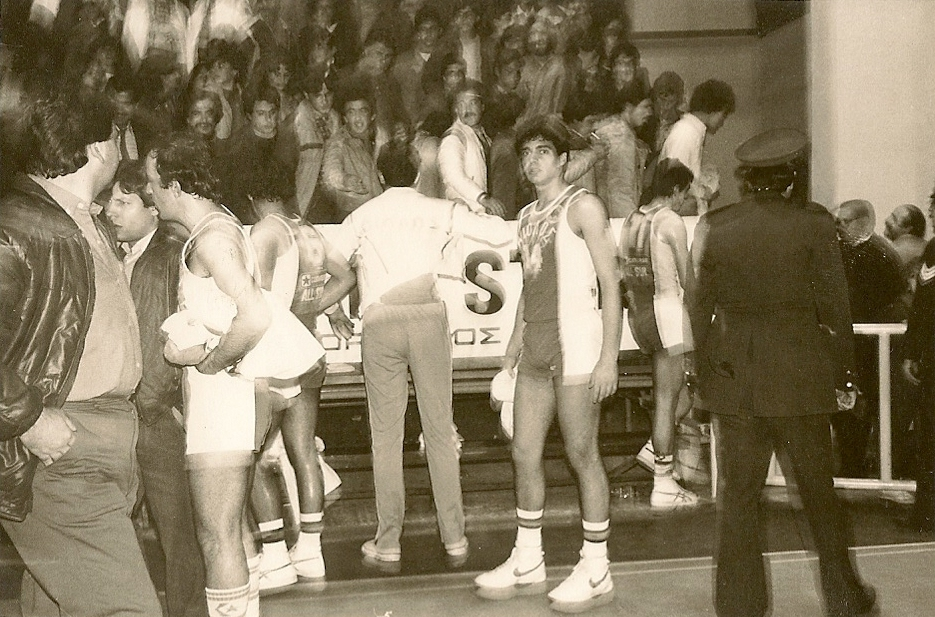
Roupas #14 during a game in Athens in front of a sold out crowd against Panellinios in the 1982–83 Greek professional basketball season. Roupas scored 22 points in a 94–93 losing effort in this exhibition game.

Roupas began the 1982-83 season in Athens, Greece playing in the A-league with AEK B.C. where he played in only one game with them where he scored four points. In the following week, Roupas played in two games with GS Larissas where he scored ten points in the first game and six points in the second game. He wound up the following week with Aiolos in the B-league where he spent the rest of the season starting at the shooting guard position for them in Athens, Greece. Roupas played in the remaining 26 regular season games for Aiolos averaging 16 points, 5 rebounds, 6 assists, and 2 shots blocked. Roupas scored a career high 27 points in a come from behind win against the Apollon Patras team. Roupas scored his team's final 7 points in the last two minutes to seal an 87–83 come from behind win before a standing room only crowd at Patras in this exhibition game. Aiolos finished the 1982–83 regular season in eighth place out of fourteen teams in their division, which was later re-aligned in the 1986–87 season by the Hellenic Basketball Federation.

Another re-alignment of the league and teams happened again in the 1992–93 season, by the newly formed Hellenic Basketball Association, which saw several teams combine into one, with Aiolos then becoming SA Aiolos-Tavros later in 2006.
