= 2008 Portsmouth Invitational Tournament =

The 2008 Portsmouth Invitational Tournament was a United States basketball tournament played in Portsmouth, Virginia from April 9 through April 12, 2008.

The tournament was won by the Tidewater Sealants, while Jamar Butler was named the tournament MVP.

== Bracket ==
Opening Round
April 9
Holiday Inn - Portsmouth | 81
Tidewater Sealants | 99
April 9
Norfolk Naval Shipyard | 96
Sales System | 88
April 10
Cherry, Bekaert & Holland | 88
Portsmouth Sports Club | 101
April 10
Norfolk Sports Club | 78
K&D Rounds Landscaping | 90

Semifinals
April 11
Tidewater Sealants | 94
Norfolk Naval Shipyard | 91
April 11
Portsmouth Sports Club | 100
K&D Rounds Landscaping | 83

Championship Game
April 12
Tidewater Sealants | 103
Portsmouth Sports Club | 80
Third place
April 12
Norfolk Naval Shipyard | 81
K&D Rounds Landscaping | 82

== Consolation Bracket ==
April 10–11
April 10
Holiday Inn - Portsmouth | 84
Sales System | 92
April 11
Cherry, Bekaert & Holland | 88
Norfolk Sports Club | 89

Fifth Place; April 12
April 12
Sales System | 97
Norfolk Sports Club | 93
Seventh Place
April 12
Holiday Inn - Portsmouth | 80
Cherry, Bekaert & Holland | 94

== Rosters ==
Cherry, Bekaert & Holland
| Player | School |
|---|---|
| Parfait Bitee | Rhode Island |
| Brian Butch | Wisconsin |
| Joe Crawford | Kentucky |
| Patrick Ewing Jr. | Georgetown |
| Charron Fisher** | Niagara |
| David Gomez | Tulane |
| Derrick Low | Washington State |
| JaJuan Smith** | Tennessee |

Holiday Inn - Portsmouth
| Player | School |
|---|---|
| Demetric Bennett | South Alabama |
| Gavin Grant | North Carolina State |
| Alex Harris | UC-Santa Barbara |
| Anthony King | Miami (Florida) |
| Bo McCalebb | New Orleans |
| Charles Rhodes | Mississippi State |
| Brian Roberts | Dayton |
| Will Thomas | George Mason |

K&D Rounds Landscaping
| Player | School |
|---|---|
| Folarin Campbell | George Mason |
| Sundiata Gaines | Georgia |
| Kentrell Gransberry | South Florida |
| Mike Green | Butler |
| Cliff Hammonds | Clemson |
| Rob Kurz | Notre Dame |
| Longar Longar | Oklahoma |
| Arizona Reid | High Point |

Norfolk Naval Shipyard
| Player | School |
|---|---|
| Adrian Banks | Arkansas State |
| Bryant Dunston | Fordham |
| Frank Elegar | Drexel |
| Gary Forbes** | Massachusetts |
| A. J. Graves | Butler |
| Anthony Morrow | Georgia Tech |
| Jason Richards | Davidson |
| Deron Washington** | Virginia Tech |

Norfolk Sports Club
| Player | School |
|---|---|
| Dwayne Curtis | Mississippi |
| Dion Dowell | Houston |
| Jonte Flowers | Winona State |
| Steven Hill | Arkansas |
| Drew Lavender | Xavier |
| Chris Lofton** | Tennessee |
| Quan Prowell | Auburn |
| Jonathan Wallace | Georgetown |

Portsmouth Sports Club
| Player | School |
|---|---|
| Jaycee Carroll | Utah State |
| Chris Daniels | Texas A&M - Corpus Christi |
| Kyle Hines** | UNC-Greensboro |
| Dominique Kirk | Texas A&M |
| Rob McKiver | Houston |
| Haminn Quaintance | Kent State |
| Mykal Riley | Alabama |
| Reggie Williams** | VMI |

Sales System
| Player | School |
|---|---|
| Ramel Bradley | Kentucky |
| Stanley Burrell | Xavier |
| Marcus Hall | Colorado |
| Justin Hawkins | New Mexico State |
| Jiri Hubalek** | Iowa State |
| Othello Hunter** | Ohio State |
| Brian Laing | Seton Hall |
| Leon Williams | Ohio |

Tidewater Sealants
| Player | School |
|---|---|
| Aaron Bruce | Baylor |
| Jamar Butler* | Ohio State |
| Pat Calathes** | Saint Joseph's |
| Josh Duncan** | Xavier |
| Joseph Jones | Texas A&M |
| Shaun Pruitt | Illinois |
| Mark Tyndale | Temple |
| Martin Zeno | Texas Tech |

* - Asterisk denotes Most Valuable Player ** - Double Asterisks denotes All Tournament Team
