= Filippos Kalogiannidis =

Greek basketball player

Free agent
- Position: Point guard

Personal information
- Born: May 15, 1994 (age 32) Thessaloniki, Greece
- Listed height: 6 ft 4 in (1.93 m)
- Listed weight: 173 lb (78 kg)

Career information
- Playing career: 2010–present

Career history
- 2010–2012: Maroussi
- 2012–2015: Ermis Lagkada
- 2015–2018: Aries Trikala
- 2018–2019: Rethymno Cretan Kings
- 2019–2020: Kolossos Rodou

Filippos Kalogiannidis (Greek: Φίλιππος Καλογιαννίδης; born May 15, 1994) is a Greek professional basketball player who last played for Kolossos Rodou of the Greek Basket League. He is a 1.93 m (6 ft 4 in) tall point guard.

== Professional career ==
Kalogiannidis began his pro career with the Greek League club Maroussi, in the 2010–11 season. After two years with the club, he joined Ermis Lagkada of the Greek A2 Basket League. After three years with Ermis, he joined Aries Trikala, for the 2015–16 season.

After also three years with the club, he left in 2018 and joined Rethymno Cretan Kings of the Greek Basket League. The next year, he joined Kolossos Rodou.
