= Marlon Maxey =

American basketball player (born 1969)

Personal information
- Born: February 19, 1969 (age 57) Chicago, Illinois, U.S.
- Listed height: 6 ft 8.75 in (2.05 m)
- Listed weight: 250 lb (113 kg)

Career information
- High school: Percy L. Julian (Chicago, Illinois)
- College: Minnesota (1987–1988); UTEP (1989–1992)
- NBA draft: 1992: 2nd round, 28th overall pick
- Drafted by: Minnesota Timberwolves
- Playing career: 1992–2001
- Position: Power forward / center
- Number: 25

Career history
- 1992–1994: Minnesota Timberwolves
- 1995: Breogán Lugo
- 1995–1996: Gymnastikos S. Larissas
- 1996–1997: Peristeri
- 1997–1998: Iraklis Thessaloniki
- 1998–1999: Peristeri
- 1999–2000: ASVEL
- 2000–2001: Alicante
- 2001: Galatasaray

Career highlights
- 2× Greek League All-Star (1996 II, 1997); French League All-Star (2000); First-team All-WAC (1992)
- Stats at NBA.com
- Stats at Basketball Reference

Marlon Lee Maxey (born February 19, 1969) is an American former professional basketball player. During his playing career, at a height of 6'8 3/4" (2.05 m) tall, and a weight of 250 lbs. (113 kg), Maxey, who was born in Chicago, Illinois, played at the power forward and center positions. Maxey was selected with the 28th overall draft pick, by the Minnesota Timberwolves, in the 1992 NBA draft.

== College career ==
After attending and playing basketball at Percy L. Julian High School, in Chicago, Illinois, Maxey played college basketball for the University of Minnesota, where he played with the Minnesota Golden Gophers (1987–1988). He also played college basketball at the University of Texas at El Paso, where he played with the UTEP Miners, from 1989 to 1992.

== Professional career ==
Maxey participated at the Portsmouth Invitational Tournament in 1992, where he was named the unanimous tourney MVP. After that, he was a second round draft pick in the 1992 NBA draft. In an NBA career that lasted two seasons, both of them spent with the Timberwolves, Maxey played in a total of 98 regular season games. He had career NBA averages of 4.9 points and 3.7 rebounds per game.

After playing in the NBA, Maxey played professionally in Spain's ACB, Greece's, Basket League, France's Pro A, and Turkey's Super League.
