= Gymnastikos S. Larissas 1928 B.C. =

Disbanded men's basketball team in Greece

Gymnastikos Syllogos Larissas
- Founded: 1928; 98 years ago
- Dissolved: 2018; 8 years ago
- History: Gymnastikos S. Larissas B.C. (1928–2015); G.S. Larissas 1928-Foinix B.C. (2015–2016); G.S. Larissas 1928 B.C. (2016–2017); G.S.L. Faros B.C. (2017–2018)
- Arena: Larissa Neapolis Indoor Arena
- Capacity: 4,000
- Location: Larissa, Greece
- Team colors: Green, White, and Blue
- President: Kostas Dastavridis
- Championships: Greek 2nd Division (1); Greek 4th Division (1)
Home	Away	Alternate

Gymnastikos Syllogos Larissas 1928 B.C. (Greek: Γυμναστικός Σύλλογος Λάρισας 1928 K.A.E.), commonly known as Gymnastikos S. Larissas, G.S. Larissas, or G.S.L., was a Greek professional basketball club that was based in Larissa, Greece. The club's colors are green, white, and blue, and its emblem is the Discobolus. The club is known for being the first professional club team of the legendary European basketball player, Vassilis Spanoulis.

== History ==
Gymnastikos S. Larissas was originally founded in 1928, and it was the first basketball club of the city of Larissa, that played in the top-tier level Greek Basket League (A1 National). In 1979, basketball coach Giannis Ioannidis, after winning the top-tier Greek League championship with Aris, surprisingly agreed to become the head coach of Gymnastikos. Gymnastikos was in the B National (at that time, the Greek 2nd division) at the time, and had great aspirations of being promoted to the top-tier Greek league.

After Ioannidis' team went undefeated in the Greek 2nd Division during the 1979–80 campaign, the team was promoted to the top division in 1980. From that time, and through the 2005–06 season, the club played several times in the top-tier Greek League (in the 1980–81, 1981–82, 1982–83, 1983–84, 1984–85, 1992–93, 1993–94, 1994–95, 1995–96, 1996–97, 1997–98, and 2005–06 seasons). The club's best season to date was the 1994–95 season, when under head coach Vangelis Alexandris' guidance, they almost earned a qualification place in the 3rd-tier European-wide league, the FIBA Korać Cup. They were ultimately denied a place in the Korać Cup by Sporting, by just one point (86–85), in the play-off decider game that determined which team qualified for Korać Cup.

Gymnastikos later suffered relegation to the Greek second division in 1998, but against all odds, they returned to the top flight Greek league in 2005. Despite the club's low budget, they had a good season in the top-tier Greek League, during the 2005–06 season. However, due to financial problems, the club was merged with AEL 1964, in 2006, which again ended its presence in Greece's top basketball league.

Also in 2006, Keravnos Larissa, the club's feeder team, changed their name to Keravnos Gymnastikos, as a reminder of the club's past glory days. Eventually, 9 years later, in 2015, Gymnastikos returned to existence, after merging with another other local club of Larissa, Foinix Larissas. Foinix Larissas had been founded in 1995, and in the previous season, it had played in the 3rd-tier level Greek B League (Beta Ethniki).

Foinix Larissas was then replaced by Gymnastikos S. Larissas, after the two clubs merged in 2015, thus ending Foinix's presence in Greek basketball competitions. The club played in the 3rd-tier level Greek B League during the 2015–16 season, and was promoted to the 2nd-tier level Greek A2 League, for the 2016–17 season.

In the summer of 2017, Gymnastikos merged with Faros Keratsiniou, and then took Faros' place in the upcoming top-tier level Greek Basket League's 2017–18 season. Faros retained all of its amateur and junior clubs. Gymnastikos' club name then officially became Gymnastikos Syllogos Larissas Faros 2017, abbreviated as G.S.L. Faros 2017. In 2018, GSL merged with Ifaistos Limnou. Ifaistos later separated its history from Gymnastikos, and ultimately the club was closed down in 2020. Gymnastikos then retained all of its own history, under its current name of Gymnastikos S. Larissas 1928 B.C.

== Arenas ==
Gymnastikos used the 2,000 seat capacity Alkazar Hall as its home arena for more than 20 years, until 1995, when the Larissa Neapolis Indoor Arena was opened. The club has since played its home games at the Larissa Neapolis, which can seat between 4,000 and 5,500 people for basketball games.

== Season by season ==
Season	[[Greek basketball league system|Tier]]	League	Pos.	W–L	[[Greek Basketball Cup|Greek Cup]]	[[Greek basketball clubs in European and worldwide competitions|European competitions]]
2015–16	3	B Basket League	1st			
2016–17	2	A2 Basket League	15th (Note: Received Faros Keratsiniou's spot in the Greek Basket League, after merging with the club.)			
2017–18	1	Basket League	11th	Quarterfinalist		

== Honors and titles ==
- Greek Second Division
  - Champions (1): 1979–80
- Greek Fourth Division
  - Champions (1): 1989–90

== Notable players ==
Note: Flags indicate national team eligibility at FIBA-sanctioned events. Players may hold other non-FIBA nationalities not displayed.

Criteria

To appear in this section a player must have either:

- Set a club record or won an individual award while at the club
- Played at least one official international match for their national team at any time
- Played at least one official NBA match at any time.

=== Greece ===
- (Greece) Vassilis Spanoulis
- (Greece) Vangelis Alexandris
- (Greece) Vassilis Angelakopoulos
- (Greece) Dimitris Bogdanos
- (Greece) Chris Chougkaz
- (Greece) Dimitris Despos
- (Greece) Georgios Diamantakos
- (Greece) Sotiris Gioulekas
- (Greece) Nestoras Kommatos
- (Greece) Christos Konstantinidis
- (Greece) Achilleas Mamatziolas
- (Greece) Paris Maragkos
- (Greece) Vassilis Mouratos
- (Greece) Manos Papamakarios
- (Greece) Nikos Papanikolopoulos
- (Greece) Nondas Papantoniou
- (Greece) Chris Roupas
- (Greece) Dimitris Spanoulis
- (Greece) Tasos Spyropoulos
- (Greece) Nikos Stavropoulos
- (Greece) Kostas Totsios
- (Greece) Asterios Zois

=== Europe ===
- Darius Dimavičius
- Roeland Schaftenaar
- (Iceland) Teitur Örlygsson

=== USA ===
- Travis Bader
- Walter Bond
- Melvin Cheatum
- Lorenzo Coleman
- Greg Dennis
- James Donaldson
- Richard Dumas
- Chris Garner
- Keith Hill
- Reggie Keely
- Ryan Lorthridge
- Jeremiah Massey
- Marlon Maxey
- Tod Murphy
- Dan Robinson
- Brent Scott
- Deon Thomas
- Sedale Threatt
- Kevin Ware

=== Rest of Americas ===
- Gary Forbes
- José Ortiz
- Chris Webber

=== NBA players ===
Over the years, the team has featured players who played in the National Basketball Association (NBA) before or after their stint with Gymnastikos.

- James Donaldson
- Richard Dumas
- Gary Forbes
- Chris Garner
- Ryan Lorthridge
- Marlon Maxey
- Tod Murphy
- José Ortiz
- Brent Scott
- (Greece) Vassilis Spanoulis
- Sedale Threatt

== Head coaches ==
- (Greece) Giannis Ioannidis
- (Greece) Vangelis Alexandris
- (Greece) Michalis Kyritsis
- (Greece) Steve Giatzoglou
- Sam Vincent
- (Greece) Periklis Tavropoulos
- (Greece) Kostas Pilafidis
- (Greece) Giannis Tzimas
- (Greece) Thanasis Skourtopoulos
