= Alex Aggelakos =

Greek basketball player (born 1994)

Alex Aggelakos Άλεξ Αγγελάκος
Kavala
- Position: Small forward / shooting guard
- League: Greek A2 Basket League

Personal information
- Born: 6 September 1994 (age 32) Rhodes, Greece
- Listed height: 6 ft 5.75 in (1.97 m)

Career information
- College: Loughbrough (2012–2015)
- NBA draft: 2014: undrafted
- Playing career: 2009–present

Career history
- 2009–2012: Kolossos Rodou
- 2012–2015: Leicester Riders
- 2015–2019: Kolossos Rodou
- 2019–2020: APOP Paphos
- 2020–2021: Koroivos Amaliadas
- 2021: Kolossos Rodou
- 2021–2022: Kavala

Alex Aggelakos (Greek: Άλεξ Αγγελάκος; born 6 September 1994) is a former Greek professional basketball player. He is a 1.97 m tall swingman.

== Professional career ==
Aggelakos began his professional career with the Greek club Kolossos Rodou. In 2014, he moved to the United Kingdom in order to study at Loughborough University. He also signed with the British club Leicester Riders. On 26 August 2015 he returned to Kolossos with a three-year contract. On 9 July 2018 Aggelakos signed a one-year extension with Kolossos.

Aggelakos spent the 2019–20 season with APOP Paphos of the Cypriot League, averaging 4.1 points, 1.9 rebounds and 1.3 assists per game. On 7 October 2020 he signed with Koroivos Amaliadas. On 12 March 2021 Aggelakos returned to Kolossos Rodou for a third stint with the team. On 15 August 2021 Aggelakos signed with Kavala.
