= Uroš Petrović (basketball) =

Serbian basketball player

Free agent
- Position: Power forward

Personal information
- Born: August 8, 1990 (age 36) Knjaževac, SR Serbia, SFR Yugoslavia
- Listed height: 6 ft 9 in (2.06 m)

Career information
- NBA draft: 2012: undrafted
- Playing career: 2008–present

Career history
- 2008–2011: Hemofarm
- 2011–2012: LSU-Atletas
- 2012–2013: Balkan Botevgrad
- 2013–2014: Aries Trikala
- 2015: Naft Abadan
- 2015: Kumanovo
- 2016: Gaz Metan Mediaș
- 2017: Peñas Huesca
Medals
Men's basketball
Representing Serbia and Montenegro
U16 European Championship
Bronze medal – third place	2006 Spain	U16 National Team

Uroš Petrović (Serbian Cyrillic: Урош Петровић; born August 8, 1990) is a Serbian professional basketball player who last played for Peñas Huesca of the Liga Española de Baloncesto.
