= Konstantinos Papazoglou =

Greek professional basketball coach

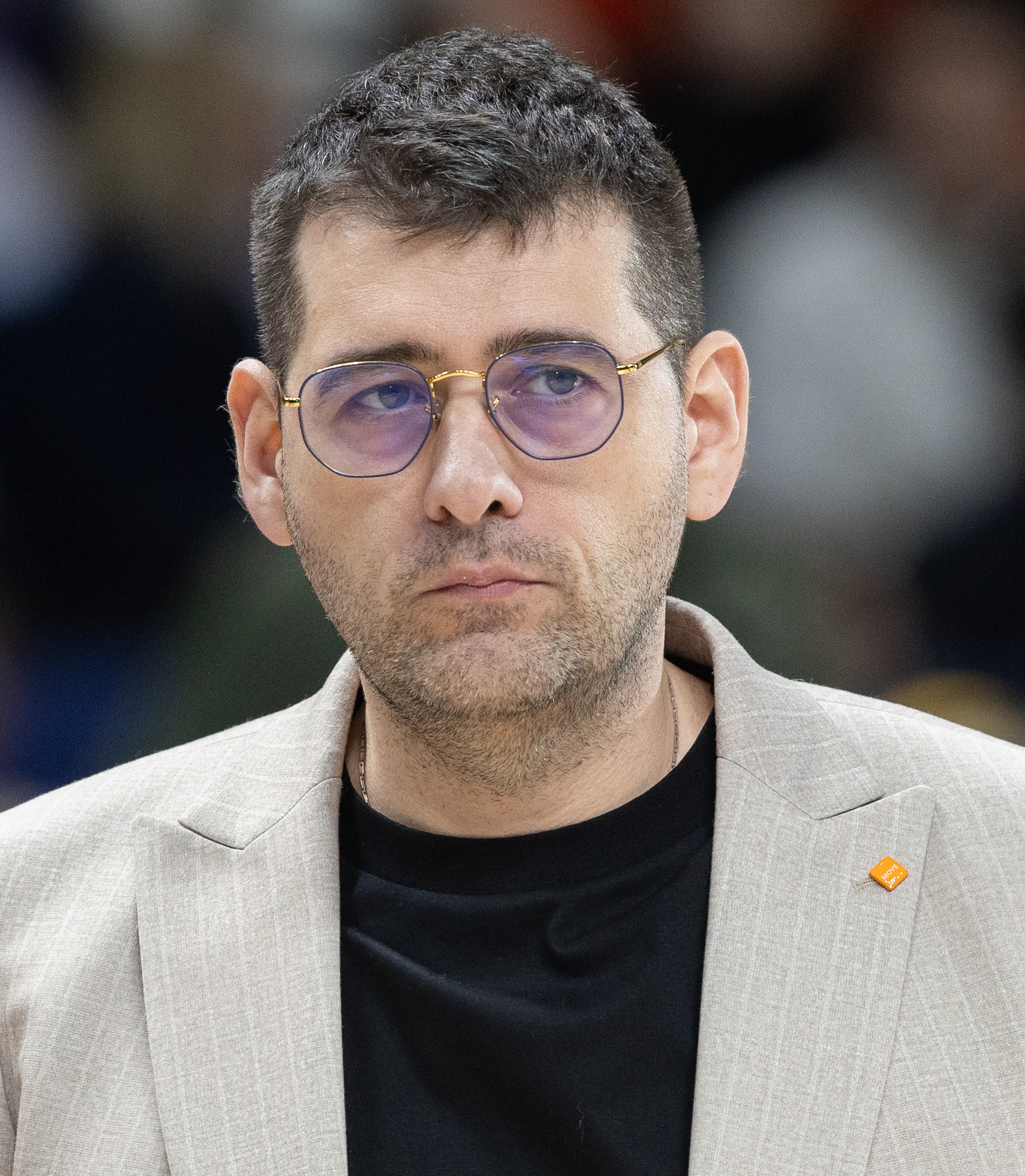
- Papazoglou in 2025

Personal information
- Born: March 18, 1984 (age 42) Thessaloniki, Greece
- Position: Head coach
- Coaching career: 2006–present

Career history

Coaching
- 2006: Makedonikos (assistant)
- 2006–2007: Polpak Swiecie (assistant)
- 2007–2008: PAOK (assistant)
- 2007–2009: Swedish national team (scout)
- 2008–2010: AEK Athens (assistant)
- 2010–2012: Ilisiakos (assistant)
- 2012–2013: Löwen Braunschweig (assistant)
- 2013–2016: Aries Trikala (assistant)
- 2016: Aries Trikala
- 2016: Rethymno Cretan Kings (assistant)
- 2017: Mid-American Unity (TBT Tournament)
- 2017–2018: PBC Astana (assistant)
- 2018–2019: Kolossos Rodou (assistant)
- 2019–2020: PAOK (assistant)
- 2020–2025: Löwen Braunschweig (assistant)
- 2025–2026: Löwen Braunschweig

Career highlights
- FIBA Asia Champions Cup Bronze Medal (2017)

Konstantinos Papazoglou (alternate spellings: Kostas Papazoglou, Greek: Κωνσταντίνος or Κώστας, Παπάζογλου; born March 18, 1984) is a Greek professional basketball coach. He was most recently the head coach for Löwen Braunschweig of the Basketball Bundesliga (BBL). He graduated from Aristotelian University's Faculty of Physical Education and Sport Sciences in 2005, majoring in basketball coaching.

== Coaching career ==
Papazoglou started his coaching career at 22 years old as the assistant coach of Makedonikos B.C. in Greek Basket League, being the youngest assistant coach in the history of the Greek Basket League.

In December 2006 Papazoglou signed as assistant coach at the Polish Basketball League team Polpak Swiecie, earning a spot in the Polish league playoffs.

In May 2007 he started to work as head scout for the Sweden N.T. for two consecutive years.

In November 2007, Papazoglou started working as assistant coach at PAOK B.C., where he stayed until the end of the season participating in Greek Basket League and Eurocup.

In June 2008, he started working as assistant coach at AEK B.C., staying in the club for two years.

In October 2010, he signed as assistant coach at Ilysiakos B.C. and stayed there for two years.

In July 2012, he worked for the first time in his career in Germany's Basketball Bundesliga league, as he was appointed assistant coach of Braunschweig. He stayed there for a year where he also worked with the German point guard Dennis Schröder, in his last year in Europe before going to the NBA and joining the Atlanta Hawks.

In June 2013 signed an assistant coach with Aries Trikala BC and stayed there for three years.

In April 2015 he promoted to head coach of Aries Trikala BC and, at the age of 31, became the third youngest head coach in the history of Greek Basket League, the absolute youngest since 1999.

In May 2016 signed as assistant coach in Rethymno Cretan Kings B.C. for one year.

In April 2017 he signed as head coach of Mid American Unity for The Basketball Tournament of summer 2017, making him the first and only European coach ever coached in TBT Tournament.

In July 2017 signed as assistant coach for first time in his career in a VTB United League team BC Astana for one year. With BC Astana he won the bronze medal in FIBA Asia Champions Cup 2017 in China.

In November 2018 signed as assistant coach in Kolossos Rodou B.C.

In August 2019 signed as assistant coach in PAOK B.C. for one year participating in Greek Basket League and Basketball Champions League.

On August 11, 2020, he signed as assistant coach with Basketball Löwen Braunschweig of the Basketball Bundesliga (BBL) remaining in this position for five years. In July 2025, Papazoglou was promoted to the head coach position at Braunschweig participating in Basketball Bundesliga (BBL), Basketball Champions League Qualifications and Fiba EuroCup where he achieve a 4-2 record in the first stage, best record in club's history in European competitions. He parted ways with the team on February 3rd, 2026.
