= Portsmouth Invitational Tournament =

Amateur basketball tournament

The Portsmouth Invitational Tournament logo

The Portsmouth Invitational Tournament, (PIT), is the only postseason camp restricted to college basketball seniors. The tournament typically begins the first or second Wednesday that follows the championship game of the NCAA Division I men's basketball tournament. All games are played at Churchland High School in Portsmouth, Virginia. Admission to day games is free, while the night session is ticketed at the door. Discounted four-day passes are sold at the Portsmouth Visitor Center. 64 graduating seniors per year are invited to play in the tournament, divided into eight teams, each sponsored by a local business.

The four-day tournament format consists of twelve games (each team plays three games) and has been held annually since 1953, excluding 2020 when the tournament was cancelled due to the COVID pandemic. The tournament is recognized by the National Basketball Association (NBA) and European scouts as a showcase for future professional players. Approximately 200 NBA representatives attend the event, which is played under NBA rules and officiated by NBA and G League referees.

NBA players who are alumni of the Portsmouth Invitational include Scottie Pippen, Dennis Rodman, John Stockton, Tim Hardaway, Ben Wallace, Avery Johnson, Jeremy Lin, Rick Barry, Dave Cowens, and Earl Monroe.

== Portsmouth Invitational players drafted by the NBA ==
Year	Player	School	Round	Pick	Team						
Year	Player	School	Round	Pick	Team	2022	Tyrese Martin	Connecticut	2	51	Golden State Warriors
2018	Devon Hall	Virginia	2	53	Oklahoma City Thunder						
2018	George King	Colorado	2	59	Phoenix Suns						
2017	Derrick White	Colorado	1	29	San Antonio Spurs						
2017	Davon Reed	Miami (Florida)	2	32	Phoenix Suns						
2017	Damyean Dotson	Houston	2	44	New York Knicks						
2017	Sterling Brown	SMU	2	46	Philadelphia 76ers						
2017	Kadeem Allen	Arizona	2	53	Boston Celtics						
2017	Jabari Bird	California	2	56	Boston Celtics						
2016	Isaiah Cousins	Oklahoma	2	59	Sacramento Kings						
2015	Richaun Holmes	Bowling Green	2	37	Philadelphia 76ers						
2015	Darrun Hilliard	Villanova	2	38	Detroit Pistons						
2015	Pat Connaughton	Notre Dame	2	41	Brooklyn Nets						
2015	Marcus Thornton	William & Mary	2	45	Boston Celtics						
2015	Cady Lalanne	UMass	2	55	San Antonio Spurs						
2014	Josh Huestis	Stanford	1	29	Oklahoma City Thunder						
2013	James Ennis	Long Beach State	2	50	Atlanta Hawks						
2012	Kim English	Missouri	2	44	Detroit Pistons						
2012	Kevin Murphy	Tennessee Tech	2	47	Utah Jazz						
2012	Kyle O'Quinn	Norfolk State	2	49	Orlando Magic						
2011	Jimmy Butler	Marquette	1	30	Chicago Bulls						
2010	Lazar Hayward	Marquette	1	30	Washington Wizards						
2010	Landry Fields	Stanford	2	39	New York Knicks						
2010	Da'Sean Butler	West Virginia	2	42	Miami Heat						
2009	DeMarre Carroll	Missouri	1	27	Memphis Grizzlies						
2009	Jermaine Taylor	Central Florida	2	32	Washington Wizards						
2009	Jon Brockman	Washington	2	38	Portland Trail Blazers						
2009	Taylor Griffin	Oklahoma	2	48	Phoenix Suns						
2009	Robert Vaden	UAB	2	54	Charlotte Bobcats						
2009	Ahmad Nivins	Saint Joseph's	2	56	Dallas Mavericks						
2008	Patrick Ewing Jr.	Georgetown	2	43	Sacramento Kings						
2008	Joe Crawford	Kentucky	2	58	Los Angeles Lakers						
2008	Deron Washington	Virginia Tech	2	59	Detroit Pistons						
2007	Carl Landry	Purdue	2	31	Seattle SuperSonics						
2006	Dee Brown	Illinois	2	46	Utah Jazz						
2005	Jason Maxiell	Cincinnati	1	26	Detroit Pistons						
2004	Jackson Vroman	Iowa State	2	31	Chicago Bulls						
2004	Antonio Burks	Memphis	2	36	Orlando Magic						
2004	Ricky Minard	Morehead State	2	48	Sacramento Kings						
2003	Jerome Beasley	North Dakota	2	33	Miami Heat						
2003	Travis Hansen	Brigham Young	2	37	Atlanta Hawks						
2003	Willie Green	Detroit	2	41	Seattle SuperSonics						
2003	James Jones	Miami (Florida)	2	49	Indiana Pacers						
2003	Brandon Hunter	Ohio	2	56	Boston Celtics						
2002	John Salmons	Miami (Florida)	1	26	San Antonio Spurs						
2002	Robert Archibald	Illinois	2	32	Memphis Grizzlies						
2002	Ronald Murray	Shaw	2	42	Milwaukee Bucks						
2002	Matt Barnes	UCLA	2	48	Memphis Grizzlies						
2002	Rasual Butler	La Salle	2	53	Miami Heat						
2001	Jeff Trepagnier	USC	2	35	Cleveland Cavaliers						
2000	Michael Smith	Louisiana-Monroe	2	35	Washington Wizards						
2000	Brian Cardinal	Purdue	2	44	Detroit Pistons						
1999	Wally Szczerbiak	Miami (Ohio)	1	6	Minnesota Timberwolves						
1999	Devean George	Augsburg	1	23	Los Angeles Lakers						
1998	Felipe Lopez	St. John's	1	24	San Antonio Spurs						
1998	Ruben Patterson	Cincinnati	2	31	Los Angeles Lakers						
1998	Shammond Williams	North Carolina	2	34	Chicago Bulls						
1998	Cuttino Mobley	Rhode Island	2	41	Houston Rockets						
1998	Ryan Stack	South Carolina	2	48	Cleveland Cavaliers						
1998	Greg Buckner	Clemson	2	53	Dallas Mavericks						
1998	Ryan Bowen	Iowa	2	55	Denver Nuggets						
1997	Johnny Taylor	Chattanooga	1	17	Orlando Magic						
1997	Bobby Jackson	Minnesota	1	23	Seattle SuperSonics						
1997	Rodrick Rhodes	USC	1	24	Houston Rockets						
1997	John Thomas	Minnesota	1	25	New York Knicks						
1997	Anthony Johnson	College of Charleston	2	39	Sacramento Kings						
1997	Cedric Henderson	Memphis	2	44	Cleveland Cavaliers						
1997	Eric Washington	Alabama	2	46	Orlando Magic						
1996	Derek Fisher	Little Rock	1	24	Los Angeles Lakers						
1996	Moochie Norris	West Florida	2	33	Milwaukee Bucks						
1996	Jamie Feick	Michigan State	2	48	Philadelphia 76ers						
1996	Amal McCaskill	Marquette	2	49	Orlando Magic						
1996	Chris Robinson	Western Kentucky	2	51	Vancouver Grizzlies						
1996	Mark Pope	Kentucky	2	52	Indiana Pacers						
1996	Shandon Anderson	Georgia	2	54	Utah Jazz						
1995	Eric Williams	Providence	1	14	Boston Celtics						
1995	Theo Ratliff	Wyoming	1	18	Detroit Pistons						
1995	Jason Caffey	Alabama	1	20	Chicago Bulls						
1995	Loren Meyer	Iowa State	1	24	Dallas Mavericks						
1994	Dickey Simpkins	Providence	1	21	Chicago Bulls						
1994	Howard Eisley	Boston College	2	30	Minnesota Timberwolves						
1994	Michael Smith	Providence	2	35	Sacramento Kings						
1994	Anthony Miller	Michigan State	2	39	Golden State Warriors						
1994	Lawrence Funderburke	Ohio State	2	51	Sacramento Kings						
1993	Scott Burrell	Connecticut	1	20	Charlotte Hornets						
1993	Chris Whitney	Clemson	2	47	San Antonio Spurs						
1992	P. J. Brown	Louisiana Tech	2	29	New Jersey Nets						
1992	Marlon Maxey	University of Texas at El Paso	2	32	Minnesota Timberwolves						
1992	Brent Price	Oklahoma	2	32	Washington Bullets						
1992	Popeye Jones	Murray State	2	41	Houston Rockets						
1991	Terrell Brandon	Oregon	1	11	Cleveland Cavaliers						
1991	Randy Brown	New Mexico State	2	31	Sacramento Kings						
1991	Bobby Phills	Southern	2	45	Milwaukee Bucks						
1991	Isaac Austin	Arizona State	2	48	Utah Jazz						
1990	Dave Jamerson	Ohio	1	15	Miami Heat						
1990	Duane Causwell	Temple	1	18	Sacramento Kings						
1990	Dee Brown	Jacksonville	1	19	Boston Celtics						
1990	Greg Foster	UTEP	2	35	Washington Bullets						
1990	Jud Buechler	Arizona	2	38	Seattle SuperSonics						
1990	Tony Massenburg	Maryland	2	43	San Antonio Spurs						
1990	Antonio Davis	UTEP	2	45	Indiana Pacers						
1989	Tim Hardaway	UTEP	1	14	Golden State Warriors						
1989	Jeff Sanders	Georgia Southern	1	20	Chicago Bulls						
1989	Chucky Brown	North Carolina State	2	43	Cleveland Cavaliers						
1988	Dan Majerle	Central Michigan	1	14	Phoenix Suns						
1988	Brian Shaw	UC Santa Barbara	1	24	Boston Celtics						
1988	Vinny Del Negro	North Carolina State	2	29	Sacramento Kings						
1988	Grant Long	Eastern Michigan	2	33	Miami Heat						
1988	Anthony Mason	Tennessee State	3	53	Portland Trail Blazers						
1987	Scottie Pippen	Central Arkansas	1	5	Seattle SuperSonics						
1987	Muggsy Bogues	Wake Forest	1	12	Washington Bullets						
1987	Chris Dudley	Yale	4	75	Cleveland Cavaliers						
1986	Dennis Rodman	Southeastern Oklahoma State	2	27	Detroit Pistons						
1986	Johnny Newman	Richmond	2	29	Cleveland Cavaliers						
1986	Jeff Hornacek	Iowa State	2	46	Phoenix Suns						
1985	Charles Oakley	Virginia Union	1	9	Cleveland Cavaliers						
1985	Terry Porter	Wisconsin-Stevens Point	1	24	Portland Trail Blazers						
1985	Gerald Wilkins	Tennessee-Chattanooga	2	47	New York Knicks						
1985	Sam Mitchell	Mercer	3	54	Houston Rockets						
1984	John Stockton	Gonzaga	1	16	Utah Jazz						
1984	Jerome Kersey	Longwood	2	46	Portland Trail Blazers						
1983	Mark West	Old Dominion	2	30	Dallas Mavericks						
1981	Eddie Johnson	Illinois	2	29	Kansas City Kings						
1980	Rick Mahorn	Hampton	2	35	Washington Bullets						
1976	John Lucas	Maryland	1	1	Houston Rockets						
1970	Dave Cowens	Florida State	1	4	Boston Celtics						
1967	Earl Monroe	Winston-Salem	1	2	Baltimore Bullets						
1965	Rick Barry	Miami (Florida)	1	2	San Francisco Warriors						

== See also ==
- 2008 Portsmouth Invitational Tournament
