= Lorrenzo Wade =

American professional basketball player (born 1985)

Personal information
- Born: November 23, 1985 (age 40) Gardena, California, U.S.
- Listed height: 6 ft 6 in (1.98 m)
- Listed weight: 226 lb (103 kg)

Career information
- High school: Cheyenne (North Las Vegas, Nevada); Hargrave Military Academy (Chatham, Virginia)
- College: Louisville (2004–2005); San Diego State (2006–2009)
- NBA draft: 2009: undrafted
- Playing career: 2009–2018
- Position: Shooting guard / small forward

Career history
- 2009: Kavala B.C.
- 2010: Rayos de Hermosillo
- 2010: San Mig Coffee Mixers
- 2010: Soles de Mexicali
- 2011: Hapoel Lev HaSharon
- 2011: Rayos de Hermosillo
- 2011–2012: Abejas de Guanajuato
- 2012: Lanús
- 2013: Juventud Sionista
- 2013: Toros de Aragua
- 2013–2015: Lanús
- 2015–2016: Atenienses de Manatí
- 2016: Delaware 87ers
- 2017: Toros de Nuevo Laredo
- 2017: Club Malvín
- 2017: Ferro Carril Oeste
- 2017: Brujos de Guayama
- 2018: Capitanes de Ciudad de México

Lorrenzo Wade (born November 23, 1985) is an American former professional basketball player. He played college basketball for the Louisville Cardinals and San Diego State Aztecs basketball teams.

== High school career ==
Lorrenzo Wade went to high school at Cheyenne High School, North Las Vegas, Nevada. There he averaged 14 points and 4 rebounds in 2001–02 and had a 30–5 record and was a state runner-up. In 2003, he was in the first-team all-state, all-region and all-division selection. Wade was named co-MVP of the 2003 state tournament where he averaged 21.5 points in six postseason games helping Cheyenne to its first-ever state title. He scored 20 points and had 22 rebounds in the state title game after recording 22 points and 14 rebounds in the semifinals. In 2002–03 they had compiled a record of 31–1. Wade played his prep season of high school basketball at Hargrave Military Academy in Virginia and averaged 14.3 points. He led his team to a 25–1 record and won the prep national championship.

== Collegiate career ==
=== 2004–05 ===
Wade was part of a Louisville team that went to the Final Four, as Wade appeared in 31 games, averaging 3.9 points per game in 10 mins per outing. Wade's best game of the season came against Tennessee State when Wade scored a then-career-high 14 points on January 2, 2005, on 5-of-8 shooting.

=== 2005–06 ===
Wade made the decision transfer to San Diego State following his freshman year, and as per NCAA regulations, was forced to sit out for the entire season.

=== 2006–07 ===
Wade started 24 of 33 games in his first season with the Aztecs, and his 10.5 points and 5.3 rebounds per game garnered him an Honorable mention to the all-Mountain West Conference team. In a loss to Syracuse in the second round of the NIT, Wade scored 16 points and notched eight rebounds in an 80–64 loss.

=== 2007–08 ===
Wade enjoyed his best season to date, averaging 14.8 points (lead team) and 3.6 (lead team) assists per game, as he was named to the first-team all-Mountain West Conference team. Wade's best game of the season included a career-high 28 points against BYU on February 23, 2008.

=== College Statistics ===
College Statistics

Legend
GP	Games played	GS	Games started	MPG	Minutes per game
FG%	Field goal percentage	3P%	3-point field goal percentage	FT%	Free throw percentage
RPG	Rebounds per game	APG	Assists per game	SPG	Steals per game
BPG	Blocks per game	PPG	Points per game	**Bold**	Career high

Year	Team	GP	GS	MPG	FG%	3P%	FT%	RPG	APG	SPG	BPG	PPG
2004–05	Louisville Cardinals	**35**	0	9.9	.429	.316	**.857**	1.7	0.2	0.5	0.1	3.9
2006–07	San Diego State Aztecs	33	24	31.4	**.472**	.260	.707	**5.3**	2.6	**1.9**	**1.2**	10.5
2007–08	San Diego State Aztecs	33	**31**	**32.1**	.450	.319	.671	4.5	**3.6**	1.0	0.6	**14.8**
2008–09	San Diego State Aztecs	26	18	31.2	.456	**.328**	.755	4.6	2.7	1.2	0.5	14.1
**Career**		127	73	25.6	.455	.305	.715	4.0	2.2	1.1	0.6	10.5

== Professional career ==
On March 19, 2010, Wade signed with Purefoods Tender Juicy Giants of the Philippines.

On October 29, 2016, Wade was acquired by the Delaware 87ers of the NBA Development League. On December 31, he was waived by Delaware. In 15 games, he averaged 11.7 points, 4.1 rebounds, 1.3 assists and 1.2 steals in 28.1 minutes.
