= Kostas Kakaroudis =

Greek basketball player

Kostas Kakaroudis Κώστας Κακαρούδης
Free agent
- Position: Power forward

Personal information
- Born: 2 May 1983 (age 43) Serres, Greece
- Listed height: 6 ft 8.5 in (2.04 m)
- Listed weight: 245 lb (111 kg)

Career information
- Playing career: 2000–present

Career history
- 2000–2003: Aris
- 2003–2004: Thermaikos
- 2004–2006: KAOD
- 2006–2007: Ionikos Lamias
- 2007–2008: Panorama
- 2008–2009: Rethymno
- 2009–2010: Olympias Patras
- 2010–2011: Ikaroi Serron
- 2011–2013: KAOD
- 2013–2014: Rovinari
- 2014: Kolossos
- 2014–2016: PAOK
- 2016–2017: Faros Keratsiniou
- 2017–2020: Iraklis

Career highlights
- Romanian Cup winner (2014)

Konstantinos "Kostas" Kakaroudis (Greek: Κωνσταντίνος "Κώστας" Κακαρούδης; born 2 May 1983) is a Greek professional basketball player who last played for Iraklis of the Greek Basket League. He is a 2.04 m (6 ft 8 1/2 in) tall power forward. He was born in Serres, Greece.

== Professional career ==
In his pro career, Kakaroudis played with some of the following clubs: Aris, Thermaikos, KAOD (2004–2006), Ionikos Lamias, Panorama, Rethymno, Olympias Patras, Ikaroi Serron, KAOD (2011–2013), Rovinari, and Kolossos. In 2014, he joined PAOK. In 2015, he signed a new 2-year contract with PAOK. In 2016, he moved to Faros. Kakaroudis spent the subsequent three seasons with Iraklis, achieving a promotion to the Greek Basket League in 2019, as well as clinching a qualification for European competitions in 2020. On 13 July 2020 he personally announced his departure from the club.

== National team career ==
Kakaroudis was a member of Greece's junior national college team that played at the 2007 World University Championship.

== Awards and accomplishments ==
- FIBA EuroCup Challenge Champion: (2003)
