= Trikala Municipal Sports Hall =

Sports arena in Trikala, Greece

Trikalon Municipal Sports Hall
- D.K. Trikalon, Trikala Indoor Hall
- Interactive map of Trikalon Municipal Sports Hall
- Full name: Trikala Municipal Sports Hall
- Location: Trikala, Greece
- Coordinates: 39.330°N 21.4637°E
- Capacity: Basketball: 2,500
- Surface: Parquet

Construction
- Opened: 1985
- Renovated: 2009, 2013
- Expanded: 2009

Tenants
- Greek national volleyball team Trikala 2000; Trikala Aries

Trikala Municipal Sports Hall (Greek: Δημοτικό Κλειστό Γυμναστήριο Τρικάλων, Dimotiko Kleisto Gymnastirio Trikalon), abbreviated as D.K. Trikalon (Δ.Κ. Τρικάλων), is an indoor sports arena that is located in Trikala, Greece. It is located next to the Trikala Municipal Stadium. It is mainly used to host basketball and volleyball games. The arena has a seating capacity of 2,500.

== History ==
Trikala Indoor Hall was originally opened in the year 1985, and was renovated and expanded in 2009, by the basketball club Trikala 2000, in order to better meet the needs of the top-tier Greek Basket League, for the club's home games. The arena was renovated again, when the basketball club Trikala Aries joined the top-tier Greek League, with Trikala Indoor Hall being their home arena. The arena has also been used to host home games of the men's Greek national volleyball team.

There are plans to further expand the arena again, in order to meet the 2nd-tier EuroCup's 3,000 seat minimum capacity.
