= Alexandros Varitimiadis =

Greek basketball player (1994–2023)

Personal information
- Born: 21 June 1994 Giannitsa, Greece
- Died: 7 May 2023 (aged 28)
- Listed height: 6 ft 7 in (2.01 m)

Career information
- NBA draft: 2016: undrafted
- Playing career: 2012–2023
- Position: Power forward

Career history
- 2012–2014: PAOK
- 2013–2014: →Filippos Verias
- 2014–2017: Aries Trikala
- 2017–2019: Umeå BSKT
- 2019: BSW Sixers
- 2019–2020: Umeå BSKT
- 2020–2023: Raiffeisen Dornbirn Lions

Alexandros Varitimiadis (Greek: Αλέξανδρος Βαρυτιμιάδης; 21 June 1994 – 7 May 2023) was a Greek professional basketball player for Raiffeisen Dornbirn Lions of the Basketball Zweite Liga. He was a 2.01 m (6 ft 7 in) tall power forward who could also play as a small forward.

== Professional career ==
Varitimiadis began his pro career with the Greek 1st Division club PAOK in 2012. In 2013, he was loaned to Filippos Verias, which was playing in the Greek 2nd Division at the time.

In 2014, he joined the Greek club Aries Trikala. After the appointment of Giannis Kastritis as the head coach, he renewed his contract for one more season.

On 29 August 2017, Varitimiadis left Trikala and joined Udominate of the Swedish Basketligan.

== Death ==
Varitimiadis died from cancer on 7 May 2023, at the age of 28.

== See also ==
- List of basketball players who died during their careers
