= Kentan Facey =

Jamaican basketball player

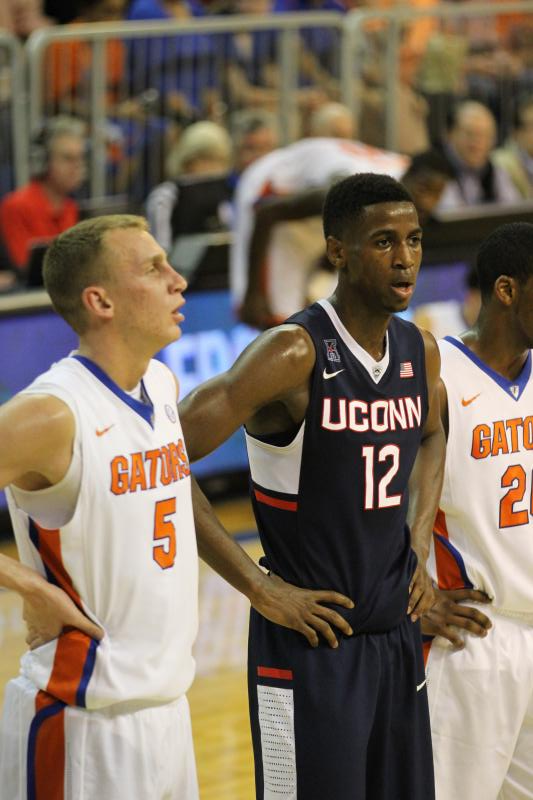

No. 12 – Caen Basket Calvados
- Position: Power forward / center
- League: (France) Elite 2

Personal information
- Born: July 14, 1993 (age 33) Trelawny, Jamaica
- Listed height: 6 ft 10 in (2.08 m)
- Listed weight: 227 lb (103 kg)

Career information
- High school: Long Island Lutheran (Brookville, New York)
- College: UConn (2013–2017)
- NBA draft: 2017: undrafted
- Playing career: 2017–present

Career history
- 2017–2018: (Greece) Aries Trikala
- 2018–2019: (Cyprus) AEL Limassol
- 2019–2021: (France) Souffelweyersheim
- 2022: (France) ADA Blois
- 2022–2023: (France) Saint-Vallier
- 2023–2024: (France) Poitiers Basket 86
- 2024–present: (France) Caen Basket Calvados

Career highlights
- LNB Pro B champion (2022); NCAA champion (2014)

Kentan Facey (born July 14, 1993) is a Jamaican basketball player for Poitiers Basket 86 of the LNB Pro B. He played college basketball for the University of Connecticut Huskies. He is a 6'10 power forward and occasional center who played on the UConn 2013–14 NCAA Championship team.he play now To Caen basket Calvados

== High school career ==
Facey attended Long Island Lutheran playing under coach John Buck. He was named N.Y. State Gatorade Player of the Year after averaging 14.8 points, 13.0 rebounds and 4.5 blocks per game in 2012-13 and was also a nominee for the McDonald’s All-American Game.

== College career ==
Kentan Facey is also notable in that he was involved in a fairly prominent decision made by the NCAA that set precedent for future eligibility issues. Due to the fact that the education system in Jamaica is more similar to that of the United Kingdom than that of the United States, Facey had already technically graduated from high school by international standards before enrolling at Long Island Lutheran High School in New York City, where he played for two seasons before enrolling at UConn. Originally, the NCAA had ruled that he had to forgo two years of his eligibility and redshirt for one season. It was later decided that this would not be applied, as the NCAA did not want to punish international athletes for performing well academically. He graduated from UConn in 2017 with a degree in communications.

== Professional career ==
After going undrafted in the 2017 NBA draft, Facey joined Aries Trikala of the Greek Basket League. In 2019, he signed with BC Souffelweyersheim of the LNB Pro B. Facey averaged 10.4 points, 7.3 rebounds, and 1 assist per game. He re-signed with the team on July 2, 2020.

== The Basketball Tournament ==
Kentan Facey played for Sideline Cancer in the 2018 edition of The Basketball Tournament. He scored 8 points and had 6 rebounds in the team's first-round loss to Gael Nation.

== College statistics ==
Year	Team	GP	GS	MPG	FG%	3P%	FT%	RPG	APG	SPG	BPG	PPG
2013–14	Connecticut	23	0	5.3	.481	.667	.667	1.8	.2	.1	.3	1.5
2014–15	Connecticut	31	22	21.5	.543	1.000	.724	5.2	.4	.2	.4	4.4
2015–16	Connecticut	35	5	12.7	.573	.000	.652	3.6	.3	.2	.9	3.1
2016–17	Connecticut	33	28	28.5	.484	.000	.703	7.1	.6	.2	1.2	8.5
Career		122	55									
