= Antonis Michaloglou =

Greek basketball player

Kavala
- Position: Power forward / center

Personal information
- Born: April 9, 1988 (age 38) Athens, Greece
- Listed height: 6 ft 8.75 in (2.05 m)

Career information
- NBA draft: 2010: undrafted
- Playing career: 2004–present

Career history
- 2004–2007: AEK Athens
- 2007–2008: Ilysiakos
- 2008–2009: Arkadikos
- 2009–2010: Pera
- 2010–2011: Doukas
- 2011–2012: Panerythraikos
- 2012–2014: Pagrati
- 2014–2015: Iraklis Thessaloniki
- 2015–2016: Doukas
- 2016–2017: Koroivos
- 2017–2022: Kavala
- 2022–2026: Dafni Dafniou BC
- 2026–present: Das Drapetsonas: Greek Youth All-Star (2007)

Antonis Michaloglou (Greek: Αντώνης Μιχάλογλου; born April 9, 1988) is a Greek professional basketball player. Born in Athens, Greece, he is a 2.06 m (6 ft 9 in) tall power forward-center.

== Professional career ==
On August 20, 2016, Michaloglou joined Koroivos Amaliadas of the Greek Basket League.
