= Steve Panos =

Greek-American basketball player

Steve Panos Στιβ Πάνος
Personal information
- Born: February 4, 1988 (age 38) Salt Lake City, Utah
- Listed height: 6 ft 9 in (2.06 m)
- Listed weight: 252 lb (114 kg)

Career information
- High school: Highland (Salt Lake City, Utah)
- College: Weber State (2006–2010)
- NBA draft: 2010: undrafted
- Playing career: 2010–2016
- Position: Power forward / center

Career history
- 2010–2012: Kolossos
- 2012–2013: Kavala
- 2013–2015: Trikala Aries
- 2015–2016: Promitheas Patras

Stephen Andrew Panos (Greek: Στιβ Πάνος; born February 4, 1988) is a Greek-American former professional basketball player. At a height of 2.06 m (6'9") tall, he played at the power forward and center positions.

== College career ==
After playing high school basketball at Highland High School, in Salt Lake City, Utah, Panos played college basketball at Weber State, from 2006 to 2010.

== Professional career ==
Panos began his pro career with the Greek League club Kolossos in 2010. He moved to the Greek club Kavala in 2012. He joined the Greek club Trikala Aries in 2013. In 2014 he resigned with Trikala for a 1-year contract

=== The Basketball Tournament ===
In the summers of 2015 and 2017, Panos played in The Basketball Tournament, on ESPN, for The Wasatch Front (Weber State Alumni). He competed for the $2 million prize in 2017, and for The Wasatch Front, he scored 6 points in their first round loss to Team Challenge ALS, by a score of 97–81.
