= Georgios Tsiaras =

Greek basketball executive and former player

PAOK Thessaloniki
- Title: Sports director
- League: Greek Basketball League; EuroCup

Personal information
- Born: May 4, 1982 (age 44) Larissa, Greece
- Listed height: 6 ft 8 in (2.03 m)
- Listed weight: 245 lb (111 kg)

Career information
- Playing career: 2001–2019
- Position: Power forward / center

Career history
- 2001–2006: AEK Athens
- 2006–2008: Olympia Larissa
- 2008–2010: PAOK Thessaloniki
- 2010: ČEZ Nymburk
- 2010–2011: Panionios Athens
- 2011–2012: Ikaros Kallitheas
- 2012–2013: Aris Thessaloniki
- 2013–2014: CS Gaz Metan Mediaș
- 2014–2015: Melilla
- 2015: Aris Thessaloniki
- 2015–2016: Aries Trikala
- 2016–2018: Apollon Patras
- 2018–2019: Kymis

Career highlights
- Greek League champion (2002); Greek League All-Star (2008); Czech NBL champion (2010); Czech Cup winner (2010)
Medals
Men's basketball
Representing Greece
AST Under-18 World Championship
Silver medal – second place	2000 Mannheim	Under-18
FIBA Europe Under-20 Championship
Gold medal – first place	2002 Lithuania	Under-20
FIBA Europe Under-18 Championship
Bronze medal – third place	2000 Croatia	Under-18

Georgios Tsiaras (also spelled Giorgos Tsiaras; Greek: Γιώργος Τσιάρας; born May 4, 1982) is a Greek basketball executive and former professional basketball player. He is the Sports Director of PAOK Thessaloniki and also serves as Team Manager of the Greece men's national basketball team.

During his playing career, Tsiaras primarily played at the power forward position, while also being used as a center.

== Professional career ==
During his first professional years, Tsiaras played with AEK Athens, winning the Greek League championship with the club in 2002. In 2006, he returned to his home city of Larissa and joined Olympia Larissa.

In 2008, Tsiaras signed with PAOK Thessaloniki, where he spent two seasons. In 2010, he moved abroad and joined ČEZ Nymburk of the Czech NBL. He won both the Czech league championship and Czech Cup with Nymburk.

At the end of the season, he returned to Greece and signed with Panionios. He subsequently played for Ikaros Kallitheas and Aris Thessaloniki.

For the 2013–14 season, Tsiaras signed with Romanian club CS Gaz Metan Mediaș, competing with the club in both the domestic league and the FIBA EuroChallenge.

In August 2014, he signed with Spanish second-division club Melilla.

In May 2015, Tsiaras returned to Aris for the 2014–15 Greek Basket League playoffs. He later played for Aries Trikala.

On August 1, 2016, Tsiaras joined Apollon Patras, where he spent two seasons. He played his final professional season with Kymis in 2018–19.

== National team career ==
Tsiaras was a member of the Greek junior national teams. He won the bronze medal at the 2000 FIBA Europe Under-18 Championship, the silver medal at the 2000 Albert Schweitzer Tournament, and the gold medal at the 2002 FIBA Europe Under-20 Championship.

== Basketball executive career ==
=== Iraklis (2020–2022) ===
Following the end of his playing career, Tsiaras moved into basketball management. On February 7, 2020, he was appointed Team Manager of Iraklis, formally beginning his post-playing career as a basketball executive. He remained in the role during Iraklis' return to European competition and continued with the club into the following seasons.

=== Peristeri (2022–2024) ===
On July 11, 2022, Tsiaras was appointed Team Manager of Peristeri, joining the club at the beginning of Vassilis Spanoulis' tenure as head coach. He served as Team Manager for two seasons, from 2022 to 2024.

=== Greece national team (2024–present) ===
In June 2024, Tsiaras was appointed Team Manager of the Greece men's national basketball team, again working alongside Spanoulis, who had become the national team's head coach. He remained in the position in subsequent seasons and continues to serve as Team Manager of the senior men's national team.

=== Monaco (2025–2026) ===
At the beginning of the 2025–26 season, Tsiaras joined the staff of Monaco, where he again worked alongside Spanoulis. He remained with the club until March 2026, while concurrently retaining his position with the Greek national team.

=== PAOK Thessaloniki (2026–present) ===
On April 24, 2026, Tsiaras returned to PAOK Thessaloniki as the club's Sports Director. The appointment marked his second spell with PAOK, having previously played for the club from 2008 to 2010. PAOK described the move as part of the strengthening and reorganisation of its sporting structure.

As Sports Director, Tsiaras became involved in the club's sporting planning ahead of the 2026–27 season, including transfer activity and international scouting. He represented PAOK at the BKT EuroCup draw in Barcelona, where he also participated in meetings held alongside the event, and later travelled to Las Vegas to attend the NBA Summer League.

== Awards and accomplishments ==
=== Professional career ===
- Greek League champion: 2002
- Greek League All-Star: 2008
- Czech NBL champion: 2010
- Czech Cup winner: 2010

=== Greek junior national team ===
- 2000 FIBA Europe Under-18 Championship: Bronze
- 2000 Albert Schweitzer Tournament: Silver
- 2002 FIBA Europe Under-20 Championship: Gold
