= Sotirios Gioulekas =

Greek professional basketball player (born 1979)

Sotiris Gioulekas Σωτήρης Γκιουλέκας
No. 17 – Ikaroi Trikala
- Position: Small forward / power forward
- League: Greek A2 League

Personal information
- Born: November 28, 1979 (age 46) Larissa, Greece
- Listed height: 2.02 m (6 ft 8 in)
- Listed weight: 100 kg (220 lb)

Career information
- Playing career: 1996–present

Career history
- 1996–2002: GS Larissa
- 2002–2003: Olympia Larissa
- 2005–2006: Nürnberger
- 2006: Virtus Bologna
- 2006–2007: Nürnberger
- 2007: Orlandina
- 2007–2008: Veroli
- 2008–2009: Brindisi
- 2009–2010: Scafati
- 2011–2013: Aries Trikala
- 2013–2014: Koroivos
- 2014–2015: Filippos Veria
- 2015–2016: Iraklis Thessaloniki
- 2016–2019: GS Larissa
Medals
Men's basketball
Representing Greece
FIBA Europe Under-16 Championship
| Bronze medal – third place | 1995 Portugal | Under-16 |

Sotirios "Sotiris" Gioulekas (Greek: Σωτήρης Γκιουλέκας, Greek pronunciation: [so'tiɾios ɟu'lekas], born November 28, 1979) is a Greek professional basketball player. He is a 6 ft 7.5 in (2.02 m) tall small forward.

== Professional career ==
In his pro career, Gioulekas has played with the following clubs: GS Larissas, Olympia Larissa, Baskets Nürnberg. In the later stages of the 2005–06 season he signed for Virtus Bologna. In April 2007 he signed for Orlandina. In July 2007, he signed an annual contract with Veroli. In December 2008 Gioulekas reached an agreement with Brindisi. In 2009, Gioulekas signed for the Italian A2 club Scafati.

In 2011, he returned to Greece for third-tier team Aries Trikala. In the summer of 2013, he signed for Koroivos of the Greek A2 League. On 29 August 2014 he signed for Greek A2 team Filippos Veria. In June 2015, he signed to Iraklis Thessaloniki.

== National team career ==
Gioulekas has represented Greece at youth level. He has played a total of 25 games for the youth sides averaging 7.8 points per game.

Gioulekas was a in the Greek roster that won the bronze medal at the 1995 FIBA Europe Under-16 Championship. During the tournament he played in all 7 games averaging 11.6 points and 3.4 rebounds per game.

== Personal life ==
In 2013 Gioulekas received his degree in Sports science from the University of Thessaly. He is married and the father of twins.
