= Nikolaos Gioulekas =

Greek military officer

Nikoloas Gioulekas (Greek: Νικόλαος Γκιουλέκας) or Goletsis or Bourboutsiotis or Vourvourtziotis was a captain in the Greek War of Independence of 1821. His family originated from Eptahori or Bourboutsiko in the prefecture of Kastoria in Northern Greece.

== Biography ==
Nikolaos Gioulekas was born towards the end of the 18th century in Eptahori. He participated in the Greek War of Independence as captain in Macedonia as well as in Southern Greece. He took part in multiple battles heading as military commander a unit of Eptahoriots. He was awarded the rank of brigadier general in the Hellenic Armed Forces. During the War of Independence he collaborated with Markos Botsaris and Theodoros Kolokotronis. The majority of his time, however, was spent fighting alongside Georgios Karaiskakis. In 1825 he was awarded the rank of tribunus militum (in Greek χιλίαρχος) in the unit led by Karaiskakis. He had a distinct contribution in the Battle of Arachova.

Following the end of the military operations he and his men returned to Eptahori where he continued to run the family’s grinding business and to operate the family-owned watermill. Along with him he brought two swords handsigned by Georgios Karaiskakis. He was finally murdered in Eptahori by a local due to personal differences.
