= Michalis Kyritsis =

Greek basketball player and coach

Personal information
- Born: 2 September 1945 Ampelokipoi, Athens, Greece
- Listed height: 5 ft 11 in (1.80 m)

Career information
- NBA draft: 1967: undrafted
- Playing career: 1963–1973
- Position: Point guard
- Coaching career: 1973–2006

Career history

Playing
- 1963–1973: Panathinaikos

Coaching
- 1973–1978: Livingston High School
- 1978–1979: Panathinaikos
- 1979–1981: Panellinios
- 1981–1982: Olympiacos Piraeus
- 1982–1983: Panionios
- 1983–1986: Panathinaikos
- 1987–1988: Panionios
- 1988–1989: Panathinaikos
- 1990–1991: Olympiacos Piraeus
- 1991–1992: Aris
- 1992–1993: AEK Athens
- 1993–1994: Gymnastikos
- 1997: Panathinaikos
- Papagou
- Peiraikos Syndesmos
- 2000–2002: MKS Pruszkow
- 2005–2006: Kolossos

Career highlights
- As player: 5× Greek League champion (1967, 1969, 1971–1973); As head coach: 2× Greek League champion (1984, 1991); Greek Cup winner (1986)

Michalis Kyritsis (alternate spellings: Mihalis, Kiritsis) (Greek: Μιχάλης Κυρίτσης, 2 September 1945) is a Greek former professional basketball player and coach. During his playing career, at a height of 1.80 m (5 ft 11 in) tall, he played at the point guard position.

== Playing career ==
Kyritsis began playing youth club basketball with the youth teams of Panathinaikos, in 1958. He began his pro career with the men's senior team, Panathinaikos, in 1963. With Panathinaikos, he won 5 Greek League championships, in the years 1967, 1969, 1971, 1972, and 1973.

== Coaching career ==
After he ended his basketball playing career, Kyritsis began working as a basketball coach. He was the head coach of the following Greek basketball clubs: Panathinaikos, Panellinios, Panionios, Olympiacos, Aris, AEK Athens, Gymnastikos S. Larissas, Papagou, and Kolossos. With Panathinaikos, he won the Greek League championship in 1984, and the Greek Cup, in 1986. With Aris, he won the Greek League championship in 1991.

== Administrative career ==
Kyritsis was the General Director of the Greek Basket League, from 2003 to 2004. He was also the general manager of PAOK.

== Personal life ==
Krytsis' son, Alexis, is a professional basketball player. Both Michalis and his son played with Panathinaikos.
