= Anthony Tucker (basketball) =

American basketball player (born 1969)

Personal information
- Born: April 4, 1969 (age 57) Washington, D.C., U.S.
- Listed height: 6 ft 8 in (2.03 m)
- Listed weight: 220 lb (100 kg)

Career information
- High school: McKinley (Washington, D.C.)
- College: Georgetown (1987–1988); Wake Forest (1989–1992)
- NBA draft: 1992: undrafted
- Position: Small forward
- Number: 21

Career history
- 1994–1995: Washington Bullets
- 1996–1997: Florida Beachdogs
- 1997–1998: La Crosse Bobcats

Career highlights
- CBA All-Defensive Team (1997); CBA Newcomer of the Year (1997); CBA rebounding leader (1997); First-team Parade All-American (1987); McDonald's All-American (1987)
- Stats at NBA.com
- Stats at Basketball Reference

Anthony Glenn Tucker (born April 4, 1969) is an American former professional basketball player. He played one season in the National Basketball Association (NBA) as a member of the Washington Bullets after signing with the team as an undrafted free agent. He attended Georgetown University his freshman year before transferring to Wake Forest University for his final three years.

Tucker played for the Florida Beachdogs of the Continental Basketball Association (CBA) during the 1996–97 season. He was named as the CBA Newcomer of the Year and selected to the All-Defensive Team.
