= Chris Webber (basketball, born 1972) =

Canadian basketball player

Personal information
- Born: December 4, 1972 (age 53) Owen Sound, Ontario, Canada
- Listed height: 6 ft 9 in (2.06 m)

Career information
- College: Carleton (1992–1993); Western (1993–1997)
- Playing career: 1998–2004
- Position: Power forward

Career history
- 1998: Newcastle Eagles
- 1998: Plymouth Raiders
- 1998: Leicester City Riders
- 1998–1999: Birmingham Bullets
- 1999–2000: Newcastle Eagles
- 2000–2002: Edinburgh Rocks
- 2002–2003: Gymnastikos S. Larissas
- 2003–2004: Leicester Riders

Christopher Webber (born December 4, 1972) is a Canadian former professional basketball player, most notable for his career in the British Basketball League.

== Career ==
Born in Owen Sound, Ontario, Webber's career began in 1992–93 with the Carleton University Ravens, where he won the Rookie of the Year title for Ontario-East. Webber transferred to his home-town University of Western Ontario for second year. As a student of the University of Western Ontario, Webber played with the senior basketball team, the Western Ontario Mustangs, where he was named to the OUAA Conference 1st Team's for 1995–96 and 1996–97.

In October 1998, the 6'9 forward signed a professional contract with British Basketball League (BBL) outfit Newcastle Eagles, however he was released after just one month at the club and subsequently joined in November Plymouth Raiders to replace Daniel Okonkwo who was in Greece representing Nigeria in the 1998 FIBA World Championship.

Following Okonkwo's return, Webber was then signed by BBL franchise Leicester City Riders, making his debut on December 12 at home to London Towers. Having moved on again to Birmingham Bullets and then returned to Newcastle the following season, Webber eventually settled with Edinburgh Rocks in 2000, before ending a two-year spell to play for Gymnastikos S. Larissas in Greece. After just one season, Webber returned to the BBL and to former club Leicester, where he saw out one final season.

Chris Webber is currently a gym instructor at Newton's Grove School in Mississauga, Ontario.

== Career history ==
- 2003–2004 (United Kingdom) Leicester Riders
- 2002–2003 (Greece) Gymnastikos S. Larissas
- 2000–2002 (United Kingdom) Edinburgh Rocks
- 1999–2000 (United Kingdom) Newcastle Eagles
- 1998–1999 (United Kingdom) Birmingham Bullets
- 1998 (United Kingdom) Leicester City Riders
- 1998 (United Kingdom) Plymouth Raiders
- 1998 (United Kingdom) Newcastle Eagles
- (Canada) Western Ontario Mustangs
