= Cherry Bekaert =

American professional services firm

- Type: Private
- Industry: Professional services
- Founded: 1947, Wilmington, North Carolina
- Headquarters: Raleigh, North Carolina
- Area served: Southeast United States
- Key people: Michelle L. Thompson (Firm Managing Partner & CEO); John T. Jobe V (Partner and CEO of Cherry Bekaert LLP); Kurt W. Taves (COO)
- Services: Assurance; Consulting; Financial Advisory; Tax
- Revenue: US$830 million (2026)
- Number of employees: More than 1,500 (2025)
- Website: cbh.com

Cherry Bekaert is a professional services firm in the United States, providing advisory, assurance, and tax solutions across the United States through two distinct entities. Headquartered in Raleigh, North Carolina, the firm employs over 2,500 people and has over 40 offices.

== History ==
Cherry Bekaert began in 1947 as a small practice in Wilmington, North Carolina, led by Harry Cherry. Charles Bekaert and William Holland joined the Firm in 1952 and 1953 respectively. The firm moved into the Richmond, Virginia, area in 1988, eventually relocating the corporate headquarters to Richmond from Charlotte in 1991.

In February 2013, Cherry Bekaert & Holland LLP launched a strategic rebranding initiative under the new name of Cherry Bekaert LLP. As part of the rebranding, Cherry Bekaert introduced its new tagline, "Your Guide Forward."

Beginning May 1, 2018, Michelle Thompson succeeded Howard Kies as Cherry Bekaert's Firm Managing Partner and Chief Executive Officer. Kies served as the firm's CEO and Firm Managing Partner for 27 years prior to Thompson's appointment.

The firm acquired Powell, Ebert & Smolik of Austin in February 2018, and in January 2019, Cherry Bekaert announced the acquisition of Flieller, Kruger & Skelton, also in Austin.

In February 2020, Cherry Bekaert LLP announced the acquisition of Icimo LLC, an analytics firm based in Raleigh. In July 2020, the firm acquired PMB Helin Donovan.

In November 2021, Cherry Bekaert acquired TaxGroup Partners, a national private equity and transaction tax advisory firm based in California. In 2022, the firm moves its headquarters to Raleigh, North Carolina.

On June 30, 2022, Cherry Bekaert announced that Parthenon Capital had invested in the Firm’s business advisory practices. Cherry Bekaert became the overall brand name. Cherry Bekaert LLP, a licensed CPA firm, provides attest services, while Cherry Bekaert Advisory LLC provides business advisory and non-attest services.

== Acquisitions ==
Starting in 2023, Cherry Bekaert has executed a series of strategic acquisitions to expand its geographic footprint and service offerings:

In 2023, the Firm acquired Legier & Co. in June, MCM CPAs & Advisors in August, and PKF Mueller in October, enhancing its presence in Louisiana, Kentucky, Florida, and Illinois.

In August 2024, Cherry Bekaert acquired Kerr Consulting, a leading Sage reseller and cloud technology provider, strengthening its ERP and outsourced accounting capabilities. In October 2024, the firm acquired ArcherPoint, a Microsoft Certified Solutions Partner, and Suite Engine, a developer of Microsoft Dynamics 365 Business Central applications. In December 2024, Cherry Bekaert acquired Katz Nannis + Solomon, a Boston-based firm specializing in audit, tax, and advisory services.

In June 2025, Cherry Bekaert acquired Spicer Jeffries LLP, a Denver‑based CPA firm specializing in audit, tax, accounting, and consulting services for the securities and asset management industry, thereby expanding the Firm’s financial services capabilities and presence in the Rocky Mountain region. In August 2025, the firm acquired Jameson & Company CPAs, a Massachusetts-based firm focused on outsourced accounting for federal contractors and grantees. In October 2025, Cherry Bekaert acquired Herbein + Company, Inc., a Pennsylvania-based CPA advisory firm, marking the Firm’s entry into Pennsylvania and expanding its reach across the northeastern, mid-Atlantic, and midwestern regions.

In January 2026, Cherry Bekaert acquired Tarsus, an accounting and advisory firm headquartered in Washington, D.C., expanding its outsourced accounting and CFO advisory capabilities. In February 2026, Cherry Bekaert acquired Richardson Kontogouris Emerson LLP (RKE), a Los Angeles–based public accounting and advisory firm, strengthening its presence on the West Coast. In June 2026, the Firm acquired Calvetti Ferguson, a Houston-based accounting and advisory firm, expanding their Texas and Nashville footprint.
