= Ionikos Lamias B.C. =

Ionikos B.C.
- Founded: 1992
- Dissolved: 2014
- Arena: Chalkiopoulio Sports Hall (capacity: 5,000)
- Location: Lamia, Greece
- Team colors: Blue and Yellow
- Website: ionikoslamias.gr
Home	Away

Ionikos Lamias B.C. was a Greek professional basketball club based in Lamia, Greece. In 2014, the club merged with Esperos Lamia.

== History ==
In 2006, Ionikos Lamias was promoted to the Greek A2 League. In the 2005–06 season, Ionikos managed to make it to the final 8 round of the Greek Cup, before being eliminated from the cup tournament by AEK Athens.

The club merged with Esperos Lamia in 2014, in order to form a new club.

== Notable players ==
- (Greece) Kostas Kakaroudis

== Notable coaches ==
- (Greece) (Serbia) Branislav Prelević
