= G.S. Olympia Larissa B.C. =

Olympia Larissas
- Leagues: Greek League; Greek Cup
- Founded: 1979
- History: 1979 – 2010
- Arena: Larissa Neapolis Arena
- Capacity: Basketball: 4,000 (permanent upper-tier seats); 5,500 (with retractable lower-tier seats)
- Location: Larissa, Greece
- Team colors: Orange; Blue
Home	Away

Olympia Larissa B.C. (alternate spellings: Olimpia, Larissas, Larisa, Larisas) (Greek: Ολύμπια Λάρισας) was a Greek professional basketball club, based in Larissa, Greece. The club's full name was Olympia Larissa Basketball Club. It was founded in 1979, making it one of the youngest sports clubs in Greece. Its colors were orange and blue. Olympia Larissa's home arena was the Larissa Neapolis Arena.

The most notable Greek players that played for the club include: Georgios Printezis, Dimos Dikoudis, and Nikos Oikonomou.

== History ==
Olympia Larissa B.C. is a team that ascended in the mid to late 2000s, as a team primarily composed of young players on the rise, with a promising future. During the 2006–07 season, Olympia Larissa placed 7th in the Greek League regular season, and qualified to the Greek League playoffs for the first time, with core leaders such as former University of Florida standout Matt Walsh, 2007 NBA draft second round draft pick Georgios Printezis, Georgios Tsiaras, and head coach Georgios Bartzokas.

In the 2007–08 season of the Greek League, Olympia qualified for the playoffs for the second consecutive year, after placing 8th in the regular season standings. In the 2007–08 season of the EuroChallenge, the team reached the Top 16 stage of the competition, and that same season in the Greek Cup, the club reached the quarterfinals.

In 2009, Olympia Larissa merged with AEL 1964, under the name G.S. Olympia Larissas. After a year, the club was relegated.

== Honours ==
- Mavroskoufia Basketball Tournament: 2002

== Notable players ==
Note: Flags indicate national team eligibility at FIBA-sanctioned events. Players may hold other non-FIBA nationalities not displayed.

Criteria

To appear in this section a player must have either:

- Set a club record or won an individual award while at the club
- Played at least one official international match for their national team at any time
- Played at least one official NBA match at any time.

- (Greece) Marios Batis
- (Greece) Kostas Charalampidis
- (Greece) Dimos Dikoudis
- (Greece) Sotiris Gioulekas
- (Greece) Nikos Kaklamanos
- (Greece) Fanis Koumpouras
- (Greece) Nikos Oikonomou
- (Greece) Pantelis Papaioakeim
- (Greece) Spiros Papavasileiou
- (Greece) Georgios Printezis
- (Greece) Kostas Totsios
- (Greece) Georgios Tsiaras

Europe:

- (Germany) Stephen Arigbabu
- (United Kingdom) Steve Hansell
- (Croatia) Vladimir Krstić
- (Latvia) Māris Ļaksa
- (Croatia) - (Greece) Franko Nakić
- (Serbia) Aleksandar Radojević
- (Germany) Sven Schultze

USA:

- (United States) Erick Barkley
- (United States) Doremus Bennerman
- (United States) Corey Belser
- (United States) James Forrest
- (United States) Tyrone Grant
- (United States) Michael Antonio "Mike" King
- (United States) Chris Massie
- (United States) Tyrone Nesby
- (United States) Matt Walsh

== Head coaches ==
- (Greece) Nikos "Magic" Stavropoulos
- (Greece) Vassilis Fragkias
- (Greece) Vangelis Alexandris
- (Greece) Georgios Bartzokas

== Women's team ==
The club's women's basketball section, compete in the 2015-16 season of the Greek Women's basketball second national tier, the A2 women's league.
