= Trikala Aries B.C. =

Aiolos Triklaon
- Founded: 1993; 33 years ago
- Dissolved: 2022; 4 years ago
- History: Aiolos Trikalon B.C. (1993–2012); Trikala B.C. (2012–2013); Trikala Aries B.C. (2013–2018); Aiolos Trikalon B.C. (2019—2021); Aiolos/Gomfoi (2021–2022)
- Arena: Trikala Municipal Sports Hall
- Capacity: 2,500
- Location: Trikala, Greece
- Team colors
- Championships: Greek 3rd Division (1); Greek 4th Division (2)

Aiolos Trikalon B.C. (alternate spellings: Aeolus, Trikala; Greek: Αίολος Τρικάλων), previously known for sponsorship reasons as Trikala Aries, was a Greek professional basketball club that is based in Trikala, Greece. The club is named after Aeolus.

== Branding ==
The club's Aiolos Trikalon B.C. logo (1993–2012).

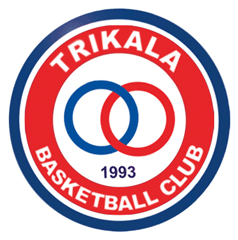
The club's Trikala B.C. logo (2012–2019).

The club's Aries Trikala B.C. logo (2012–2019).

The club's Aiolos Trikalon B.C. logo (2019–2022).

== History ==
The club was founded in 1993, under the name Aiolus Trikalon Basketball Club. During the 2008–09 season, Aeolus failed to achieve a promotion place in their league, and to qualify to the Greek B League (3rd-tier division on the Greek basketball pyramid). However, in the subsequent 2009–10 season, Aeolus managed to qualify.

In the next season, 2010–11, they finished in 9th place in the Greek B League. In 2012, the club changed its name to Trikala Basketball Club, abbreviated as Trikala B.C., and it then competed in the Greek Second Division, for the first time, during the 2012–13 season. In 2013, Greek company Aries became the official name sponsor of the team, and the team became known as Trikala Aries.

The club competed in the top-tier level Greek Basket League, for the first time, in the 2013–14 season. During their first season in the top level Greek League, Trikala finished in 11th place. Following the 2017–18 season, the team had financial difficulties and had to disband. The team returned for the 2018–19 season, once again under the club's original name of Aiolos Trikalon. In 2022 the club merged with Ikaros Trikala, and the new club has the name Trikala Basket.

== Arena ==
Trikala plays its home games at Trikala Municipal Sports Hall, which has a seating capacity of 2,500.

== Season by season ==
Season	[[Greek basketball league system|Tier]]	League	Pos.	W–L	[[Greek Basketball Cup|Greek Cup]]	[[Greek basketball clubs in European and worldwide competitions|European competitions]]
2006–07	5	ESKA A Category	3rd			
2007–08	5	ESKA A Category	3rd			
2008–09	4	C Basket League	2nd			
2009–10	4	C Basket League	1st			
2010–11	3	B Basket League	9th		1st Round, MD 2	
2011–12	3	B Basket League	1st		2nd Round, MD 1	
2012–13	2	A2 Basket League	2nd	21-5	2nd Round, MD 3	
2013–14	1	Basket League	11th	9–17	2nd Round, MD 1	
2014–15	1	Basket League	12th	8–18	2nd Round, MD 2	
2015–16	1	Basket League	9th	9–17	2nd Round, MD 3	
2016–17	1	Basket League	10th	10–16	2nd Round, MD 1	
2017–18	1	Basket League	14th	4–22	2nd Round, MD 1	
2018–19	-	-	-	-	-	
2019–20	4	C Basket League	1st	15–2		
2020–21	3	B Basket League	3rd	2–0		
2021–22	3	B Basket League	2nd	20–4		

== Titles and honors ==
=== Domestic competitions ===
- Greek 3rd Division

Champions (1): (2011–12)

- Greek 4th Division

Champions (2): (2009–10, 2019–20)

== Roster ==
Note: Flags indicate national team eligibility at FIBA-sanctioned events. Players may hold other non-FIBA nationalities not displayed.

Trikala Aries B.C. roster
Players	Coaches
Pos. / No. / Nat. / Name / Ht. / Wt. / Age	Head coach: (Greece) vacant; Assistant coach(es): (Greece) vacant; Legend: (C) Team captain; Injured; Roster; Updated: August 4, 2020

== Notable players ==
Note: Flags indicate national team eligibility at FIBA-sanctioned events. Players may hold other non-FIBA nationalities not displayed.

Criteria

To appear in this section a player must have either:

- Set a club record or won an individual award while at the club
- Played at least one official international match for their national team at any time
- Played at least one official NBA match at any time.

Greece

- Georgios Georgakis
- Michalis Giannakidis
- Sotiris Gioulekas
- Nikos Kaklamanos
- Nestoras Kommatos
- Marios Matalon
- Steve Panos
- Sofoklis Schortsanitis
- Georgios Tsiaras
- Alexandros Varitimiadis
- Kostas Vasileiadis

Europe

- Gilvydas Biruta
- Slaven Čupković
- Oleksandr Lypovyy
- Uroš Petrović
- Justin Robinson
- Ovie Soko
- Marko Tejić
- - Angelo Tsagarakis
- Hörður Vilhjálmsson
- (Sweden) Alexander Lindqvist

USA

- Kwame Alexander
- Kelsey Barlow
- Nate Bowie
- Brandon Brown
- Mike Caffey
- Demitrius Conger
- Chris Evans
- Alex Harris
- David Haughton
- Justin Ingram
- Paul Jones
- Lamond Murray Jr.
- D. J. Richardson

Rest of Americas

- Junior Cadougan
- Patrick Ewing Jr.
- Kentan Facey

Africa

- Kenny Kadji

== Head coaches ==
- Kostas Flevarakis
- Konstantinos Papazoglou
- Ioannis Kastritis
- Kostas Mexas

== Sponsorship names ==
For sponsorship reasons, the team has been known as:

- Trikala Aries (2013–2018)

=== Other Sponsors ===
- Gold Sponsor: Olympos
- Official Sport Clothing Manufacturer: Adidas
- Official Sponsor: Mikel Coffee Company
- Official Supporter: Hondos Center
