= Kavala B.C. =

- Nickname: Αργοναύτες (Argonauts)
- Leagues: Greek A2 League; Greek Cup
- Founded: 2003
- History: Kavala B.C. (2003–present)
- Arena: Kalamitsa Indoor Hall
- Capacity: 1,650
- Location: Kavala, Greece
- Team colors
- President: Kostas Papakonstantinou
- Head coach: Ilias Moisiadis
- Championships: 1 Greek 2nd Division (2015)
- Website: kavalabc.gr
| Home | Away |

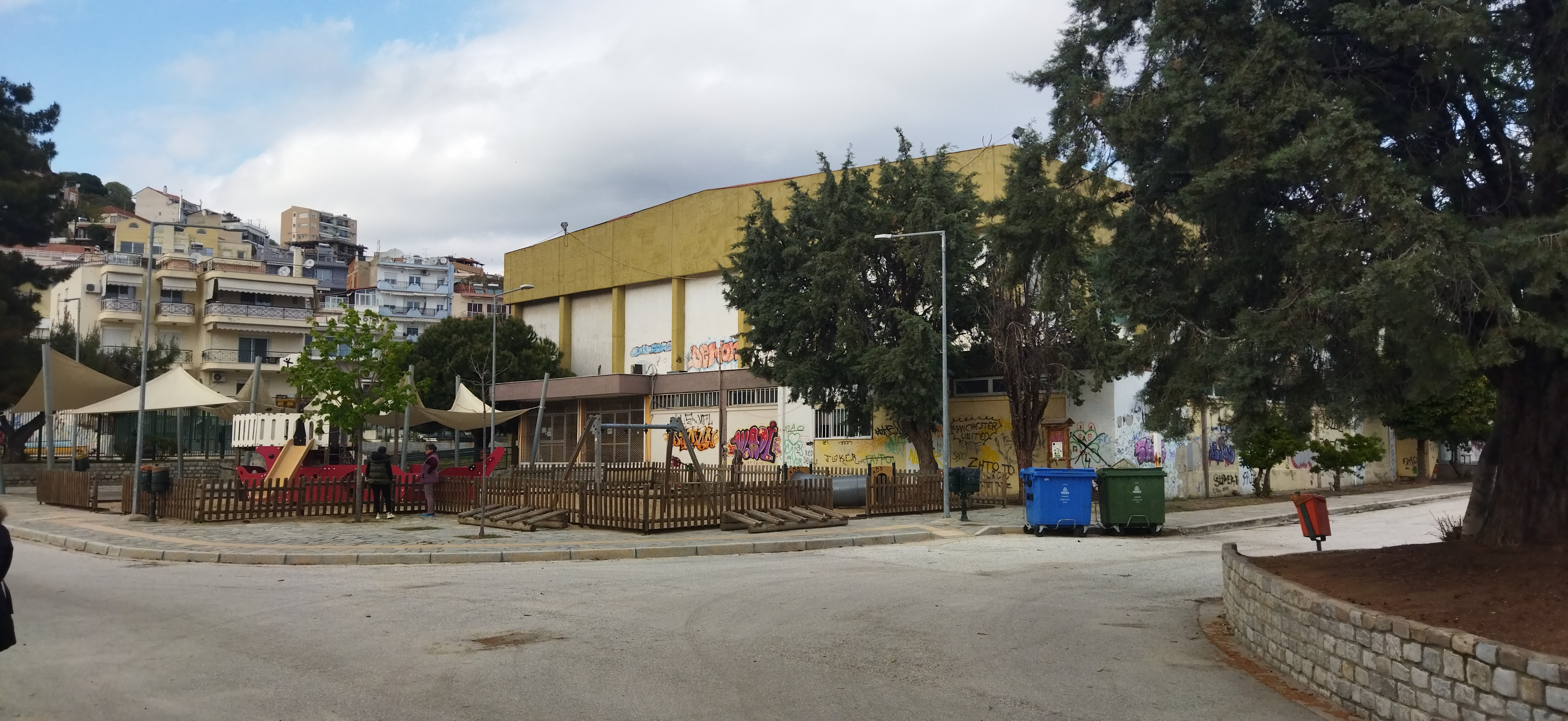
Kalamitsa Indoor Hall

Kavala B.C. is a Greek professional basketball club that is located in Kavala, Greece. The club is also known as E.K. Kavalas, with the club's full name being Enosi Kalathosfairisis Kavalas, which means Kavala Basketball Union (Greek: Ένωση Καλαθοσφαίρισης Καβάλας). The club competes in the 2nd-tier level Greek A2 Basket League.

== Club branding ==
(2015–present)

== History ==
Kavala B.C. was founded in 2003. In 2008, Kavala B.C. merged with Panorama B.C. to form the club Kavala B.C. (men's professional team). That same year, the merged club joined the first division of Greek pro basketball, the Greek Basket League, for the first time.

The club has played six seasons in the Greek top division (2008–09, 2009–10, 2010–11, 2011–12, 2012–13, and 2015–16). The club's best finish in the top Greek League so far is sixth place, in the 2010–11 and 2011–12 seasons.

After spending two seasons in the Greek 2nd Division, Kavala was promoted again to the top-tier Greek Basket League. During the 2015–16 season, Steve Giatzoglou, became the team's head coach, after replacing Giannis Tzimas, due to the poor performances of the club to begin the season, and in order for the club to avoid relegation. Eventually, the club was relegated anyway, after finishing in 14th place in the league.

== Titles and honors ==
- Greek 2nd Division

Champions (1): 2014–15

== Roster ==
Kavala B.C. roster
Players
Coaches

| Pos. | No. | Nat. | Name | Ht. | Wt. | Age |
|---|---|---|---|---|---|---|
| SF | 11 | (Greece) | Koumlelis, Stavros | 2.00 m (6 ft 7 in) | | 41 – 25 January 1984 |
| SF | 12 | (Greece) | Gelios, Sokratis | 2.00 m (6 ft 7 in) | | 30 – 12 January 1995 |
| C | 16 | (Greece) | Manakas, Giorgos | 2.02 m (6 ft 8 in) | | 27 – 8 December 1997 |
| F/C | 88 | (Greece) | Michaloglou, Antonis | 2.05 m (6 ft 9 in) | | 36 – 9 April 1988 |
| G/F | | (Greece) | Aggelakos, Alex | 2.00 m (6 ft 7 in) | | 30 – 6 September 1994 |

Head coach

- (Greece) Ilias Moisaidis

Assistant coach(es)

Legend

- (C) Team captain
- Injured

- Roster
Updated: October 8, 2015

== Notable players ==
Note: Flags indicate national team eligibility at FIBA-sanctioned events. Players may hold other non-FIBA nationalities not displayed.

Criteria

To appear in this section a player must have either:

- Set a club record or won an individual award while at the club
- Played at least one official international match for their national team at any time
- Played at least one official NBA match at any time.

Greece:
- (Greece) Vassilis Angelakopoulos
- (Greece) Giannis Gagaloudis
- (Greece) Georgios Georgakis
- (Greece) Savvas Iliadis
- (Greece) Kostas Kakaroudis
- (Greece) Sotiris Karapostolou
- (Greece) Ioannis Karathanasis
- (Greece) Alexis Kyritsis
- (Greece) Vassilis Symtsak
- (Greece) Alexandros Sigkounas
- (Greece) Sotiris Manolopoulos
- (Greece) Dimitris Lolas
- (Greece) - (United States) Steve Panos
- (Greece) - (Serbia) Igor Milošević
- (Greece) Christoforos Stefanidis

Europe:'

- (United Kingdom) Kieron Achara
- (Estonia) Gregor Arbet
- (France) Alain Digbeu
- (Lithuania) Giedrius Gustas
- (Finland) Shawn Huff
- (Serbia) Branko Jorović
- (Lithuania) Antanas Kavaliauskas
- (Bulgaria) Chavdar Kostov
- (North Macedonia) Bojan Krstevski
- (Lithuania) Laurynas Mikalauskas
- (Bosnia and Herzegovina) - (Canada) Nemanja Mitrović
- (Serbia) Mladen Pantić
- (Serbia) - (Greece) Miroslav Raičević
- (Bulgaria) - (United States) Cedric Simmons
- (Croatia) Bruno Šundov

USA:

- (United States) DeJuan Collins
- (United States) Will Daniels
- (United States) Taquan Dean
- (United States) Justin Gray
- (United States) Maurice Kemp
- (United States) Lasan Kromah
- (United States) James Nunnally
- (United States) - (Central African Republic) Patrick O'Bryant
- (United States) Russell Robinson
- (United States) Richard Shields
- (United States) Mike Taylor
- (United States) Billy Thomas
- (United States) Lorrenzo Wade
- (United States) Leon Williams

Rest of Americas:

- (Belize) - (United States) Milt Palacio
- (Dominican Republic) Eloy Vargas

Africa:

- (Ivory Coast) - (France) Pape-Philippe Amagou

== Head coaches ==
- (Greece) Vangelis Alexandris
- (Greece) Dimitris Priftis
- (Greece) Angelos Koronios
- (Greece) Steve Giatzoglou

== Name sponsorships ==
- Great Shirt Sponsor: Geotech
- Official Sport Clothing Manufacturer:
- Official Sponsor: Avance Rent A Car, Revoil
- Academies Sponsor: NovaMed, taxydromiki.gr
