= 1994–95 Utah Jazz season =

NBA professional basketball team season

- Head coach: Jerry Sloan
- General manager: Tim Howells
- Owner: Larry H. Miller
- Arena: Delta Center

Results
- Record: 60–22 (.732)
- Place: Division: 2nd (Midwest); Conference: 3rd (Western)
- Playoff finish: First round (lost to Rockets 2–3)
- Stats at Basketball Reference

Local media
- Television: KJZZ-TV; Prime Sports Intermountain West
- Radio: KCNR

The 1994–95 Utah Jazz season was the 21st season for the Utah Jazz in the National Basketball Association, and their 16th season in Salt Lake City, Utah.

== Season summary ==
=== Off-season ===
During the off-season, the Jazz signed free agent Antoine Carr, and acquired Adam Keefe from the Atlanta Hawks.

=== Regular season ===
With the addition of Carr and Keefe, the Jazz struggled losing four of their first six games of the regular season, but then won seven of their next eight games, and posted an eight-game winning streak in December. The team posted a 14–1 record in January, which included a 14-game winning streak which ended in early February, as the Jazz held a 35–13 record at the All-Star break. At mid-season, the team traded Jay Humphries to the Boston Celtics in exchange for former Jazz guard Blue Edwards. The Jazz posted a nine-game winning streak between February and March, and then won their final seven games of the season, finishing in second place in the Midwest Division with a 60–22 record, and earning the third seed in the Western Conference; the team qualified for the NBA playoffs for the twelfth consecutive year.

Karl Malone averaged 26.7 points, 10.6 rebounds, 3.5 assists and 1.6 steals per game, while Jeff Hornacek averaged 16.5 points, 4.3 assists and 1.6 steals per game, and John Stockton provided the team with 14.7 points, 12.3 assists and 2.4 steals per game, and also led them with 102 three-point field goals. In addition, David Benoit contributed 10.4 points and 5.2 rebounds per game, while Felton Spencer provided with 9.3 points and 7.6 rebounds per game, but only played just 34 games due to an Achilles tendon injury. Off the bench, Carr averaged 9.6 points and 3.4 rebounds per game, while Edwards contributed 6.6 points per game in 36 games after the trade, Keefe provided with 6.1 points and 4.4 rebounds per game, Tom Chambers contributed 6.2 points per game, and James Donaldson averaged 2.6 points and 2.5 rebounds per game.

During the NBA All-Star weekend at the America West Arena in Phoenix, Arizona, Malone and Stockton were both selected for the 1995 NBA All-Star Game, as members of the Western Conference All-Star team, while rookie small forward, and second-round draft pick Jamie Watson participated in the NBA Slam Dunk Contest. In a year of milestones, Stockton became the NBA's all-time assist leader passing Magic Johnson with 9,921 on his way to a record tying eighth straight assist title. Meanwhile, Malone and Chambers both passed the 20,000 point mark in their careers. Malone and Stockton were also both named to the All-NBA First Team, while Stockton was named to the NBA All-Defensive Second Team. Malone finished in third place in Most Valuable Player voting, while Stockton finished in eighth place; Carr finished in seventh place in Sixth Man of the Year voting, and head coach Jerry Sloan finished in fourth place in Coach of the Year voting.

The Jazz finished fifth in the NBA in home-game attendance, with an attendance of 811,159 at the Delta Center during the regular season.

=== NBA playoffs ===
In the Western Conference First Round of the 1995 NBA playoffs, and for the second consecutive year, the Jazz faced off against the 6th–seeded, and defending NBA champion Houston Rockets, a team that featured All-Star center Hakeem Olajuwon, All-Star guard Clyde Drexler, and Robert Horry. With the series tied at 1–1, the Jazz won Game 3 over the Rockets on the road, 95–82 at The Summit to take a 2–1 series lead. However, the Jazz lost the next two games, which included a Game 5 loss to the Rockets at home, 95–91 at the Delta Center, thus losing in a hard-fought five-game series.

The Rockets would go on to defeat the Orlando Magic in a four-game sweep in the 1995 NBA Finals, winning their second consecutive NBA championship.

=== Aftermath ===
Following the season, Chambers left to play overseas in Israel, and Edwards was left unprotected in the 1995 NBA expansion draft, where he was selected by the Vancouver Grizzlies expansion team.

== Draft picks ==
Round	Pick	Player	Position	Nationality	College
2	47	Jamie Watson	SF	United States	South Carolina

== Roster ==
1994–95 Utah Jazz roster
Players

Pos.	No.	Player	Height	Weight	DOB	From
F	21	David Benoit	6 ft 8 in (2.03 m)	220 lb (100 kg)	1968–05–09	Alabama
G	20	Walter Bond	6 ft 5 in (1.96 m)	200 lb (91 kg)	1969–02–01	Minnesota
F	55	Antoine Carr	6 ft 9 in (2.06 m)	225 lb (102 kg)	1961–07–23	Wichita State
F	42	Tom Chambers	6 ft 10 in (2.08 m)	220 lb (100 kg)	1959–06–21	Utah
G	25	John Crotty	6 ft 1 in (1.85 m)	185 lb (84 kg)	1969–07–15	Virginia
C	54	James Donaldson	7 ft 2 in (2.18 m)	275 lb (125 kg)	1957–08–16	Washington State
G	30	Blue Edwards	6 ft 4 in (1.93 m)	200 lb (91 kg)	1965–10–31	East Carolina
G	14	Jeff Hornacek	6 ft 3 in (1.91 m)	190 lb (86 kg)	1963–05–03	Iowa State
F	31	Adam Keefe	6 ft 9 in (2.06 m)	230 lb (104 kg)	1970–02–22	Stanford
F	32	Karl Malone	6 ft 9 in (2.06 m)	250 lb (113 kg)	1963–07–24	Louisiana Tech
F	34	Bryon Russell	6 ft 7 in (2.01 m)	225 lb (102 kg)	1970–12–31	Long Beach State
C	50	Felton Spencer	7 ft 0 in (2.13 m)	265 lb (120 kg)	1968–01–15	Louisville
G	12	John Stockton	6 ft 1 in (1.85 m)	170 lb (77 kg)	1962–03–26	Gonzaga
F	15	Jamie Watson	6 ft 7 in (2.01 m)	190 lb (86 kg)	1972–02–23	South Carolina

Coaches
Head coach
- Jerry Sloan
Assistant(s)
- Gordon Chiesa
- David Fredman
- Phil Johnson

Legend
- (DP) Unsigned draft pick
- (FA) Free agent
- (S) Suspended
- Injured

Roster
Updated: February 3, 1995

== Regular season ==
=== Season standings ===
Midwest Division	W	L	PCT	GB	Home	Road	Div
z-San Antonio Spurs	62	20	.756	—	33–8	29–12	20–6
x-Utah Jazz	60	22	.732	2	33–8	27–14	17–9
x-Houston Rockets	47	35	.573	15	25–16	22–19	13–13
x-Denver Nuggets	41	41	.500	21	23–18	18–23	13–13
Dallas Mavericks	36	46	.439	26	19–22	17–24	11–15
Minnesota Timberwolves	21	61	.256	41	13–28	8–33	4–22

#	Western Conference				
#	Team	W	L	PCT	GB
1	z-San Antonio Spurs	62	20	.756	–
2	y-Phoenix Suns	59	23	.720	3
3	x-Utah Jazz	60	22	.732	2
4	x-Seattle SuperSonics	57	25	.695	5
5	x-Los Angeles Lakers	48	34	.585	14
6	x-Houston Rockets	47	35	.573	15
7	x-Portland Trail Blazers	44	38	.537	18
8	x-Denver Nuggets	41	41	.500	21
9	Sacramento Kings	39	43	.476	23
10	Dallas Mavericks	36	46	.439	26
11	Golden State Warriors	26	56	.317	36
12	Minnesota Timberwolves	21	61	.256	41
13	Los Angeles Clippers	17	65	.207	45

== Game log ==
=== Regular season ===
1994–95 game log
Total: 60–22 (home: 33–8; road: 27–14)
November: 9–5 (home: 7–1; road: 2–4)

Game	Date	Team	Score	High points	High rebounds	High assists	Location Attendance	Record

December: 10–4 (home: 2–4; road: 8–0)

Game	Date	Team	Score	High points	High rebounds	High assists	Location Attendance	Record
28	December 30; 7:00 p.m. MST	Houston	L 103–111	Malone (25)	Malone (14)	Stockton (16)	Delta Center; 19,911	19–9

January: 14–1 (home: 9–1; road: 5–0)

Game	Date	Team	Score	High points	High rebounds	High assists	Location Attendance	Record

February: 8–6 (home: 4–1; road: 4–5)

Game	Date	Team	Score	High points	High rebounds	High assists	Location Attendance	Record
45	February 2; 6:30 p.m. MST	@ Houston	L 101–121	Malone (26)	Malone (10)	Stockton (5)	The Summit; 16,611	34–11
All-Star Break

March: 12–4 (home: 5–1; road: 7–3)

Game	Date	Team	Score	High points	High rebounds	High assists	Location Attendance	Record
68	March 23; 6:30 p.m. MST	@ Houston	W 112–104	Malone (30)	Malone (15)	Stockton (16)	The Summit; 16,611	50–18

April: 8–2 (home: 6–0; road: 2–2)

Game	Date	Team	Score	High points	High rebounds	High assists	Location Attendance	Record
80	April 19; 7:00 p.m. MDT	Houston	W 115–96	Malone (45)	Malone (17)	Stockton (15)	Delta Center; 19,911	58–22
82	April 23; 5:00 p.m. MDT	@ Houston	W 103–97	Malone (23)	Malone (15)	Malone, Stockton (8)	The Summit; 16,611	60–22

1994–95 schedule

== Playoffs ==
1995 playoff game log
Western Conference First Round: 2–3 (home: 1–2; road: 1–1)

Game	Date	Team	Score	High points	High rebounds	High assists	Location Attendance	Series
1	April 27; 7:30 p.m. MDT	Houston	W 102–100	Stockton (28)	Malone (14)	Stockton (10)	Delta Center; 19,911	1–0
2	April 29; 7:30 p.m. MDT	Houston	L 126–140	Malone (28)	Malone (17)	Sockton (12)	Delta Center; 19,911	1–1
3	May 3; 7:30 p.m. MDT	@ Houston	W 95–82	Malone (32)	Malone (19)	Stockton (13)	The Summit; 16,611	2–1
4	May 5; 7:30 p.m. MDT	@ Houston	L 106–123	Malone (31)	Benoit (7)	Stockton (11)	The Summit; 16,611	2–2
5	May 7; 1:00 p.m. MDT	Houston	L 91–95	Malone (35)	Malone (10)	Hornacek (6)	Delta Center; 19,911	2–3

1995 schedule

== Player statistics ==
Legend
GP	Games played	GS	Games started	MPG	Minutes per game
FG%	Field-goal percentage	3P%	3-point field-goal percentage	FT%	Free-throw percentage
RPG	Rebounds per game	APG	Assists per game	SPG	Steals per game
BPG	Blocks per game	PPG	Points per game

=== Season ===
Player	GP	GS	MPG	FG%	3FG%	FT%	RPG	APG	SPG	BPG	PPG
Karl Malone	82	82	38.1	.536	.268	.742	10.6	3.5	1.6	1.0	26.7
Jeff Hornacek	81	81	33.3	.514	.406	.882	2.6	4.3	1.6	0.2	16.5
John Stockton	82	82	35.0	.542	.449	.804	3.1	12.3	2.4	0.3	14.7
David Benoit	71	67	25.9	.486	.330	.841	5.2	0.8	0.6	0.7	10.4
Antoine Carr	78	4	21.5	.531	.250	.821	3.4	0.9	0.3	0.9	9.6
Felton Spencer	34	34	26.6	.488		.793	7.6	0.5	0.4	0.9	9.3
Blue Edwards	36	0	16.8	.495	.344	.762	1.8	0.8	0.7	0.2	6.6
Tom Chambers	81	4	15.3	.457	.167	.807	2.6	0.9	0.3	0.4	6.2
Adam Keefe	75	0	16.9	.577		.676	4.4	0.4	0.5	0.3	6.1
Walter Bond	18	0	13.3	.500	.378	.688	1.5	0.9	0.3	0.2	5.4
Bryon Russell	63	15	13.7	.437	.295	.667	2.2	0.5	0.8	0.2	4.5
John Crotty	80	0	12.7	.403	.306	.810	1.2	2.6	0.5	0.1	3.7
Jamie Watson	60	1	11.2	.500	.263	.679	1.2	1.0	0.6	0.2	3.3
James Donaldson	43	40	14.3	.595		.710	2.5	0.3	0.1	0.7	2.6
Jay Humphries	12	0	12.4	.160	.667		0.8	0.8	0.6	0.0	0.8

=== Playoffs ===
Player	GP	GS	MPG	FG%	3FG%	FT%	RPG	APG	SPG	BPG	PPG
Karl Malone	5	5	43.2	.466	.333	.692	13.2	3.8	1.4	0.4	30.2
John Stockton	5	5	38.6	.459	.400	.765	3.4	10.2	1.4	0.2	17.8
Jeff Hornacek	5	5	35.6	.510	.538	.786	1.2	4.0	1.6	0.2	14.0
David Benoit	5	5	33.4	.467	.440	.667	5.6	0.8	0.4	0.8	11.8
Antoine Carr	5	0	22.8	.452		.833	3.0	1.4	0.6	1.0	9.6
Tom Chambers	5	0	12.0	.500	.333	.692	2.6	0.4	0.4	0.0	6.4
Bryon Russell	2	0	6.5	.571	.500	.500	1.0	1.5	0.5	0.0	5.5
Adam Keefe	4	0	17.3	.583		.667	4.3	0.5	1.3	0.3	4.5
James Donaldson	5	5	15.2	.833		1.000	1.8	0.0	0.0	0.6	2.8
Jamie Watson	5	0	11.4	.667			0.2	0.6	0.4	0.2	2.4
Blue Edwards	4	0	8.3	.333	1.000		1.5	0.8	0.5	0.0	2.3
John Crotty	3	0	8.0	.667		.600	0.0	2.0	0.3	0.0	2.3

Player statistics citation:

== Awards and records ==
- Karl Malone, All-NBA First Team
- John Stockton, All-NBA First Team
- John Stockton, NBA All-Defensive Second Team
