= 1994–95 Los Angeles Clippers season =

NBA professional basketball team season

- Head coach: Bill Fitch
- Owners: Donald Sterling
- Arena: Los Angeles Memorial Sports Arena; Arrowhead Pond

Results
- Record: 17–65 (.207)
- Place: Division: 7th (Pacific); Conference: 13th (Western)
- Playoff finish: Did not qualify

Local media
- Television: KCOP-TV (Ralph Lawler, Bill Walton)
- Radio: KMPC (Rory Markas)

The 1994–95 Los Angeles Clippers season was the 25th season for the Los Angeles Clippers in the National Basketball Association, their eleventh season in Los Angeles, California, and their first season in which they played occasional home games in Anaheim, California.

== Season summary ==
=== Off-season ===
The Clippers received the seventh overall pick in the 1994 NBA draft, and selected small forward Lamond Murray from the University of California. During the off-season, the team acquired Pooh Richardson, Malik Sealy, and rookie shooting guard, and first-round draft pick Eric Piatkowski out of the University of Nebraska–Lincoln from the Indiana Pacers, signed free agent Tony Massenburg, and hired Bill Fitch as their new head coach.

=== Regular season ===
Early into the regular season, the Clippers traveled overseas to Yokohama, Japan to play two games against the Portland Trail Blazers at the Yokohama Arena. In the first game on November 4, 1994, the Clippers were the home team and lost to the Trail Blazers by a score of 121–100, in front of 14,229 fans in attendance; second-year guard Terry Dehere led the team with 19 points and 6 assists, while Loy Vaught finished with 16 points, and Massenburg posted a double-double of 13 points and 12 rebounds. In the second game on November 5, the Clippers were the road team and lost to the Trail Blazers by a score of 112–95, in front of 14,239 fans in attendance; Massenburg finished with a double-double of 16 points and 13 rebounds, while Dehere also added 16 points.

Under Fitch and with the addition of Murray, Richardson, Sealy and Massenburg, the Clippers struggled posting a dreadful 16-game losing streak to start the regular season, as Stanley Roberts missed the entire season due to a ruptured Achilles tendon. The team posted two six-game losing streaks between January and February, and held an 8–40 record at the All-Star break. The Clippers posted an eight-game losing streak in March, and another six-game losing streak in April, losing 15 of their final 18 games of the season, and finishing in last place in the Pacific Division with a league-worst 17–65 record.

Vaught showed improvement averaging 17.5 points, 9.7 rebounds and 1.3 steals per game, while Murray averaged 14.1 points and 4.4 rebounds per game, but was not named to an NBA All-Rookie Team at season's end, and Richardson provided the team with 10.9 points, 7.9 assists and 1.6 steals per game. In addition, Sealy contributed 13.0 points per game, while Dehere provided with 10.4 points per game, Massenburg averaged 9.3 points and 5.7 rebounds per game, Piatkowski contributed 7.0 points per game, and second-year forward Bo Outlaw provided with 5.2 points, 3.9 rebounds and 1.9 blocks per game.

During the NBA All-Star weekend at the America West Arena in Phoenix, Arizona, Murray was selected for the NBA Rookie Game, as a member of the White team. The Clippers finished last in the NBA in home-game attendance, with an attendance of 438,244 at the Los Angeles Memorial Sports Arena during the regular season, which was 27th in the league.

=== Notable highlights ===
One notable highlight of the regular season occurred on December 9, 1994, in which the Clippers defeated their crosstown rival, the Los Angeles Lakers on the road, 109–84 at the Great Western Forum. The Clippers held a 63–35 lead over the Lakers at halftime, as Richardson finished the game with 20 points, 10 assists and 5 steals, while Sealy led the team with 25 points, and Vaught posted a double-double of 19 points and 15 rebounds. It was the Clippers' second win of the season, which led to a 2–16 record.

=== Aftermath ===
Following the season, Gary Grant was released to free agency, and signed as a free agent with the New York Knicks during the next season, while Massenburg was left unprotected in the 1995 NBA expansion draft, where he was selected by the Toronto Raptors expansion team, and Elmore Spencer was traded to the Denver Nuggets.

== Draft ==
Round	Pick	Player	Position	Nationality	College
1	7	Lamond Murray	SF	United States	California
1	25	Greg Minor	SG/SF	United States	Louisville

== Roster ==
1994–95 Los Angeles Clippers roster
Players

Pos.	No.	Player	Height	Weight	DOB	From
G	24	Terry Dehere	6 ft 2 in (1.88 m)	190 lb (86 kg)	1971–09–12	Seton Hall
G/F	30	Harold Ellis	6 ft 5 in (1.96 m)	200 lb (91 kg)	1970–10–07	Morehouse
G	23	Gary Grant	6 ft 3 in (1.91 m)	185 lb (84 kg)	1965–04–21	Michigan
C	9	Tony Massenburg	6 ft 9 in (2.06 m)	220 lb (100 kg)	1967–07–31	Maryland
F	7	Lamond Murray	6 ft 7 in (2.01 m)	236 lb (107 kg)	1973–04–20	California
F	45	Bo Outlaw	6 ft 8 in (2.03 m)	210 lb (95 kg)	1971–04–13	Houston
G	52	Eric Piatkowski	6 ft 7 in (2.01 m)	215 lb (98 kg)	1970–09–30	Nebraska
G	2	Pooh Richardson	6 ft 1 in (1.85 m)	180 lb (82 kg)	1966–05–14	UCLA
C	42	Eric Riley	7 ft 0 in (2.13 m)	245 lb (111 kg)	1970–06–02	Michigan
C	53	Stanley Roberts (IN)	7 ft 0 in (2.13 m)	285 lb (129 kg)	1970–02–07	LSU
G/F	21	Malik Sealy	6 ft 8 in (2.03 m)	190 lb (86 kg)	1970–02–01	St. John's
F	4	Michael Smith	6 ft 10 in (2.08 m)	225 lb (102 kg)	1965–05–19	BYU
C	27	Elmore Spencer	7 ft 0 in (2.13 m)	270 lb (122 kg)	1969–12–06	UNLV
F	35	Loy Vaught	6 ft 9 in (2.06 m)	230 lb (104 kg)	1968–02–27	Michigan
G	14	Randy Woods	5 ft 10 in (1.78 m)	185 lb (84 kg)	1970–09–23	La Salle

Coaches
Head coach
- Bill Fitch
Assistant(s)
- Jim Brewer
- Bob Ociepka
- Barry Hecker

Legend
- (DP) Unsigned draft pick
- (FA) Free agent
- (S) Suspended
- (IN) Inactive
- Injured

Roster

=== Roster notes ===
- Center Stanley Roberts was on the injured reserve list due to an Achilles tendon rupture, and missed the entire regular season.

== Regular season ==
=== Season standings ===
Pacific Division	W	L	PCT	GB	Home	Road	Div
y-Phoenix Suns	59	23	.720	—	32–9	27–14	23–7
x-Seattle SuperSonics	57	25	.695	2	32–9	25–16	16–14
x-Los Angeles Lakers	48	34	.585	11	29–12	19–22	15–15
x-Portland Trail Blazers	44	38	.537	15	26–15	18–23	17–13
Sacramento Kings	39	43	.476	20	27–14	12–29	17–13
Golden State Warriors	26	56	.317	33	15–26	11–30	11–19
Los Angeles Clippers	17	65	.207	42	13–28	4–37	6–24

#	Western Conference				
#	Team	W	L	PCT	GB
1	z-San Antonio Spurs	62	20	.756	–
2	y-Phoenix Suns	59	23	.720	3
3	x-Utah Jazz	60	22	.732	2
4	x-Seattle SuperSonics	57	25	.695	5
5	x-Los Angeles Lakers	48	34	.585	14
6	x-Houston Rockets	47	35	.573	15
7	x-Portland Trail Blazers	44	38	.537	18
8	x-Denver Nuggets	41	41	.500	21
9	Sacramento Kings	39	43	.476	23
10	Dallas Mavericks	36	46	.439	26
11	Golden State Warriors	26	56	.317	36
12	Minnesota Timberwolves	21	61	.256	41
13	Los Angeles Clippers	17	65	.207	45

z – clinched division title
y – clinched division title
x – clinched playoff spot

== Game log ==
=== Regular season ===
1994–95 game log
Total: 17–65 (Home: 13–28; Road: 4–37)
November: 0–13 (home: 0–6; road: 0–7)

Game	Date	Team	Score	High points	High rebounds	High assists	Location Attendance	Record

December: 4–12 (home: 2–7; road: 2–5)

Game	Date	Team	Score	High points	High rebounds	High assists	Location Attendance	Record

January: 3–12 (home: 2–4; road: 1–8)

Game	Date	Team	Score	High points	High rebounds	High assists	Location Attendance	Record

February: 4–9 (home: 4–2; road: 0–7)

Game	Date	Team	Score	High points	High rebounds	High assists	Location Attendance	Record
48	February 9, 1995; 7:30 p.m. PST	Houston	W 122–107	Vaught (33)	Vaught (13)	Richardson (14)	Los Angeles Memorial Sports Arena; 7,178	8–40
All-Star Break
49	February 14, 1995; 57:30 p.m. PST	@ Houston	L 104–124	Vaught (20)	Outlaw (11)	Woods (11)	The Summit; 15,071	8–41

March: 3–12 (home: 3–6; road: 0–6)

Game	Date	Team	Score	High points	High rebounds	High assists	Location Attendance	Record
72	March 30, 1995; 7:30 p.m. PST	Houston	L 96–108	Murray (26)	Vaught (16)	Richardson (8)	Los Angeles Memorial Sports Arena; 11,561	14–58

April: 3–7 (home: 2–3; road: 1–4)

Game	Date	Team	Score	High points	High rebounds	High assists	Location Attendance	Record
79	April 17, 1995; 5:30 p.m. PDT	@ Houston	L 111–121	Dehere (23)	Vaught (12)	Dehere (10)	The Summit; 16,027	16–63

1994–95 schedule

== Player statistics ==
Legend
GP	Games played	GS	Games started	MPG	Minutes per game
FG%	Field-goal percentage	3P%	3-point field-goal percentage	FT%	Free-throw percentage
RPG	Rebounds per game	APG	Assists per game	SPG	Steals per game
BPG	Blocks per game	PPG	Points per game

Player	GP	GS	MPG	FG%	3P%	FT%	RPG	APG	SPG	BPG	PPG
Loy Vaught	80	79	37.1	51.4	21.2	71.0	9.7	1.7	1.3	0.4	17.5
Lamond Murray	81	61	31.6	40.2	29.8	75.4	4.4	1.6	0.9	0.7	14.1
Malik Sealy	60	41	26.7	43.5	30.1	78.0	3.6	1.8	1.2	0.4	13.0
Pooh Richardson	80	77	35.8	39.4	35.7	64.8	3.3	7.9	1.6	0.2	10.9
Terry Dehere	80	28	22.2	40.7	29.4	78.4	1.9	2.8	0.6	0.1	10.4
Tony Massenburg	80	50	26.6	46.9	0.0	75.3	5.7	0.8	0.6	0.7	9.3
Eric Piatkowski	81	11	14.9	44.1	37.4	78.3	1.6	1.0	0.5	0.2	7.0
Elmore Spencer	19	8	19.4	44.1	0.0	56.0	3.4	1.3	0.7	1.2	6.9
Gary Grant	33	2	14.2	47.0	25.0	81.8	1.1	2.8	0.9	0.1	6.2
Michael Smith	29	0	11.0	47.0	12.5	86.7	1.9	0.7	0.2	0.1	5.3
Bo Outlaw	81	31	20.4	52.3	0.0	44.1	3.9	1.0	1.1	1.9	5.2
Matt Fish	26	8	14.2	47.6	0.0	67.6	3.2	0.7	0.6	0.3	4.7
Eric Riley	40	4	10.9	44.8	0.0	73.4	2.8	0.3	0.4	0.9	4.4
Harold Ellis	69	7	9.5	48.1	7.7	59.0	1.3	0.6	1.0	0.2	3.7
Bob Martin	1	0	14.0	20.0	0.0	0.0	2.0	1.0	0.0	1.0	2.0
Randy Woods	62	3	8.0	31.6	29.7	73.7	0.7	2.2	0.7	0.0	2.0

Player statistics citation:

== Transactions ==
The Clippers were involved in the following transactions during the 1994–95 season.

=== Trades ===
June 30, 1994
To Los Angeles Clippers

- Pooh Richardson, Malik Sealy and draft rights to Eric Piatkowski
To Indiana Pacers

- Mark Jackson and draft rights to Greg Minor

=== Free agents ===
==== Additions ====
Player	Signed	Former team
Tony Massenburg	June 27	FC Barcelona (Liga ACB)
Matt Fish	October 5	Portland Trail Blazers
Eric Riley	December 18	Houston Rockets
Michael Smith	February 20	CB Estudiantes Caja Postal (Liga ACB)

==== Subtractions ====
Player	Left	New team
John Williams	released, June 15	Indiana Pacers
Tom Tolbert	waived, June 29	Charlotte Hornets
Dominique Wilkins	free agency, July 25	Boston Celtics
Ron Harper	free agency, September 15	Chicago Bulls
Bob Martin	waived, December 14	Shreveport Crawdads (CBA)
Matt Fish	waived, January 5	New York Knicks

Player Transactions Citation:

== See also ==
- Los Angeles Clippers
- Los Angeles Memorial Sports Arena
- Arrowhead Pond of Anaheim

=== Other Anaheim–based teams in 1994–95 ===
- California Angels (Anaheim Stadium)
  - 1994 California Angels season
  - 1995 California Angels season
- Los Angeles Rams (Anaheim Stadium)
  - 1994 Los Angeles Rams season
- Mighty Ducks of Anaheim (Arrowhead Pond of Anaheim)
  - 1994–95 Mighty Ducks of Anaheim season

*Note: The Clippers played occasional games in Anaheim
