= 1994–95 Houston Rockets season =

American professional basketball team season

- NBA champions
- Conference champions
- Head coach: Rudy Tomjanovich
- General manager: Bob Weinhauer
- Owner: Leslie Alexander
- Arena: The Summit

Results
- Record: 47–35 (.573)
- Place: Division: 3rd (Midwest); Conference: 6th (Western)
- Playoff finish: NBA champions (Defeated Magic 4–0)
- Stats at Basketball Reference

Local media
- Television: KTXH; Prime Sports Southwest (Bill Worrell, Calvin Murphy)
- Radio: KTRH (Gene Peterson, Jim Foley)

The 1994–95 Houston Rockets season was the 28th season for the franchise in the National Basketball Association, and their 24th season in Houston, Texas. The Rockets entered the regular season as defending NBA champions, having defeated the New York Knicks in seven games in the 1994 NBA Finals, and winning their first ever NBA championship.

== Season summary ==
=== Off-season ===
During the off-season, the team signed free agent Pete Chilcutt.

=== Regular season ===
The Rockets got off to a fast start by winning their first nine games of the regular season, but started to slow down as the team lost 9 of their next 14 games afterwards. The Rockets then posted a six-game winning streak between December and January, leading to a 20–9 start to the season. However, the team then lost six of their next ten games, and later on held a 29–17 record at the All-Star break.

On February 14, 1995, the Rockets traded Otis Thorpe to the Portland Trail Blazers in exchange for All-Star guard Clyde Drexler, and three-point specialist Tracy Murray; Drexler and Hakeem Olajuwon were both teammates at the University of Houston in the early 1980s. The team also signed free agent Chucky Brown midway through the season, and later on signed 38-year old veteran Charles Jones to a 10-day contract in April, where he played in the final three games of the regular season. However, despite the addition of Drexler, the Rockets played .500 in winning percentage for the remainder of the season, posting an 18–18 record on their way to finishing in third place in the Midwest Division with a 47–35 record, and earning the sixth seed in the Western Conference.

Olajuwon averaged 27.8 points, 10.8 rebounds, 3.5 assists, 1.8 steals and 3.4 blocks per game, while Drexler averaged 21.4 points, 7.0 rebounds, 4.4 assists and 1.7 steals per game in 35 games after the trade; Olajuwon and Drexler were both named to the All-NBA Third Team. In addition, Vernon Maxwell provided the team with 13.3 points per game, and led them with 143 three-point field goals, while Kenny Smith contributed 10.4 points per game and 142 three-point field goals, and Robert Horry averaged 10.2 points per game. Off the bench, second-year guard Sam Cassell provided with 9.5 points and 4.9 assists per game, while Mario Elie contributed 8.8 points per game, Carl Herrera averaged 6.8 points and 4.6 rebounds per game, and Chilcutt provided with 5.3 points and 4.7 rebounds per game.

During the NBA All-Star weekend at the America West Arena in Phoenix, Arizona, Olajuwon was selected for the 1995 NBA All-Star Game, as a member of the Western Conference All-Star team. Olajuwon finished in fifth place in Most Valuable Player voting, while Drexler finished in 14th place; Olajuwon also finished in third place in Defensive Player of the Year voting. According to Horry, when All-Star center David Robinson of the San Antonio Spurs was given his NBA Most Valuable Player of the Year award, before a game in the Western Conference Finals between the Spurs and Rockets, Olajuwon got upset and claimed that Robinson won "his" trophy; Olajuwon won the MVP award the previous season.

The Rockets finished 17th in the NBA in home-game attendance, with an attendance of 653,389 at The Summit during the regular season.

=== NBA playoffs ===
In the Western Conference First Round of the 1995 NBA playoffs, and for the second consecutive year, the Rockets faced off against the 3rd–seeded Utah Jazz, who were led by the trio of All-Star forward Karl Malone, All-Star guard John Stockton, and Jeff Hornacek. With the series tied at 1–1, the Rockets lost Game 3 to the Jazz at home, 95–82 at The Summit as the Jazz took a 2–1 series lead. However, the Rockets managed to win the next two games, which included a Game 5 win over the Jazz on the road, 95–91 at the Delta Center to win in a hard-fought five-game series.

In the Western Conference Semi-finals, and also for the second consecutive year, the team faced off against the 2nd–seeded, and Pacific Division champion Phoenix Suns, who were led by the All-Star trio of Charles Barkley, Kevin Johnson, and three-point specialist Dan Majerle. The Rockets lost the first two games to the Suns on the road at the America West Arena, before winning Game 3 at home, 118–85 at The Summit, but then lost Game 4 at home, 114–110 as the Suns took a 3–1 series lead. However, the Rockets managed to win the next three games, including a Game 7 win over the Suns at the America West Arena, 115–114 to win in a hard-fought seven-game series, and advance to the Western Conference Finals.

In the "All-Texas Western Conference Finals", the Rockets then faced off against the top–seeded, and Midwest Division champion Spurs, who were led by the trio of Robinson, Sean Elliott, and rebound-specialist Dennis Rodman. Both teams lacked home-court advantage in the series, as the Rockets won the first two games over the Spurs on the road at the Alamodome, and then lost their next two home games at The Summit, before winning Game 5 over the Spurs at the Alamodome, 111–90. The road team won every game in the series until the Rockets won Game 6 over the Spurs at home, 100–95 at The Summit to win the series in six games, and advance to the NBA Finals for the second consecutive year.

In the 1995 NBA Finals, the Rockets faced off against the top–seeded Orlando Magic, who were led by the All-Star trio of Shaquille O'Neal, second-year star Penny Hardaway, and Horace Grant. The Rockets won Game 1 over the Magic on the road in overtime, 120–118 at the Orlando Arena, and then won Game 2 on the road, 117–106 to take a 2–0 series lead. The Rockets won the next two games at home, including a Game 4 win over the Magic at The Summit, 113–101 to win the series in a four-game sweep, and winning their second consecutive NBA championship, as Olajuwon was named the NBA Finals Most Valuable Player for the second straight year. As the 6th seed in the 1995 playoffs, the 1994–95 Rockets to date are the lowest seeded team in league history to win an NBA championship.

=== Notable incidents ===
One notable incident of the regular season occurred on February 6, 1995, during a road game against the Trail Blazers at the Memorial Coliseum. Maxwell ran into the stands to punch a fan, and was suspended for ten games; the Rockets suffered a 38-point margin loss to the Trail Blazers, 120–82. Maxwell also left the Rockets during the NBA playoffs after being replaced with Drexler as the team's starting shooting guard.

=== Aftermath ===
Following the season, Maxwell signed as a free agent with the Philadelphia 76ers, while Murray signed with the Toronto Raptors expansion team, and Herrera signed with the San Antonio Spurs. Meanwhile, Croatian rookie center Žan Tabak was left unprotected in the 1995 NBA expansion draft, where he was selected by the Raptors.

== NBA draft ==
Round	Pick	Player	Position	Nationality	College
2	53	Albert Burditt	PF	United States	Texas

== Roster ==
1994–95 Houston Rockets roster
Players

Pos.	No.	Player	Height	Weight	DOB	From
F	15	Tim Breaux	6 ft 7 in (2.01 m)	215 lb (98 kg)	1970–09–19	Wyoming
F	52	Chucky Brown	6 ft 7 in (2.01 m)	214 lb (97 kg)	1968–02–29	NC State
G	10	Sam Cassell	6 ft 3 in (1.91 m)	185 lb (84 kg)	1969–11–18	Florida State
F	32	Pete Chilcutt	6 ft 10 in (2.08 m)	230 lb (104 kg)	1968–09–14	North Carolina
G	22	Clyde Drexler	6 ft 7 in (2.01 m)	210 lb (95 kg)	1962–06–22	Houston
G	17	Mario Elie	6 ft 5 in (1.96 m)	210 lb (95 kg)	1963–11–26	American International
F	7	Carl Herrera	6 ft 9 in (2.06 m)	215 lb (98 kg)	1966–12–14	Houston
F	25	Robert Horry	6 ft 9 in (2.06 m)	220 lb (100 kg)	1970–08–25	Alabama
F	27	Charles Jones	6 ft 9 in (2.06 m)	215 lb (98 kg)	1957–04–03	Albany State
G	11	Vernon Maxwell	6 ft 4 in (1.93 m)	180 lb (82 kg)	1965–09–12	Florida
F	31	Tracy Murray	6 ft 7 in (2.01 m)	225 lb (102 kg)	1971–07–25	UCLA
C	34	Hakeem Olajuwon	7 ft 0 in (2.13 m)	255 lb (116 kg)	1963–01–21	Houston
G	30	Kenny Smith	6 ft 3 in (1.91 m)	170 lb (77 kg)	1965–03–08	North Carolina
C	55	Žan Tabak	7 ft 0 in (2.13 m)	245 lb (111 kg)	1970–06–15	Croatia

Coaches
Head coach
- Rudy Tomjanovich
Assistant(s)
- Bill Berry
- Jim Boylen
- Carroll Dawson
- Larry Smith

Legend
- (DP) Unsigned draft pick
- (FA) Free agent
- (S) Suspended
- Injured

Roster
Updated: April 22, 1995

== Regular season ==
=== Season standings ===
Midwest Division	W	L	PCT	GB	Home	Road	Div
z-San Antonio Spurs	62	20	.756	—	33–8	29–12	20–6
x-Utah Jazz	60	22	.732	2	33–8	27–14	17–9
x-Houston Rockets	47	35	.573	15	25–16	22–19	13–13
x-Denver Nuggets	41	41	.500	21	23–18	18–23	13–13
Dallas Mavericks	36	46	.439	26	19–22	17–24	11–15
Minnesota Timberwolves	21	61	.256	41	13–28	8–33	4–22

#	Western Conference				
#	Team	W	L	PCT	GB
1	z-San Antonio Spurs	62	20	.756	–
2	y-Phoenix Suns	59	23	.720	3
3	x-Utah Jazz	60	22	.732	2
4	x-Seattle SuperSonics	57	25	.695	5
5	x-Los Angeles Lakers	48	34	.585	14
6	x-Houston Rockets	47	35	.573	15
7	x-Portland Trail Blazers	44	38	.537	18
8	x-Denver Nuggets	41	41	.500	21
9	Sacramento Kings	39	43	.476	23
10	Dallas Mavericks	36	46	.439	26
11	Golden State Warriors	26	56	.317	36
12	Minnesota Timberwolves	21	61	.256	41
13	Los Angeles Clippers	17	65	.207	45

== Game log ==
=== Regular season ===
1994–95 game log
Total: 47–35 (Home: 25–16; Road: 22–19)
November: 10–3 (home: 4–2; road: 6–1)

Game	Date	Team	Score	High points	High rebounds	High assists	Location Attendance	Record
1	November 4; 7:30 p.m. CST	New Jersey	W 90–86	Olajuwon (19)	Olajuwon, Thorpe (8)	Cassell (5)	The Summit; 16,611	1–0
2	November 5; 7:00 p.m. CST	@ Minnesota	W 115–85	Olajuwon (23)	Thorpe (14)	Maxwell (7)	Target Center; 16,578	2–0
3	November 8; 7:00 p.m. CST	@ Cleveland	W 100–98	Olajuwon (21)	Olajuwon (12)	Cassell (9)	Gund Arena; 20,562	3–0
4	November 9; 5:00 p.m. CST	@ Indiana	W 109–104	Olajuwon (43)	Olajuwon (16)	Cassell, Horry, Smith (5)	Market Square Arena; 15,258	4–0
5	November 11; 6:30 p.m. CST	@ Boston	W 102–82	Olajuwon (26)	Olajuwon (14)	Horry (6)	Boston Garden; 14,890	5–0
6	November 12; 6:30 p.m. CST	@ New Jersey	W 100–84	Olajuwon (31)	Thorpe (13)	Horry (5)	Brendan Byrne Arena; 20,049	6–0
7	November 15; 7:30 p.m. CST	Sacramento	W 105–99	Olajuwon (28)	Olajuwon (14)	Maxwell (8)	The Summit; 14,656	7–0
8	November 17; 7:00 p.m. CST	Chicago	W 106–83	Olajuwon (29)	Olajuwon (14)	Maxwell (8)	The Summit; 16,199	8–0
9	November 19; 8:00 p.m. CST	@ Denver	W 109–101	Olajuwon (26)	Olajuwon (13)	Cassell (9)	McNichols Sports Arena; 17,171	9–0
10	November 22; 7:30 p.m. CST	Portland	L 94–102	Olajuwon (27)	Thorpe (10)	Maxwell (6)	The Summit; 16,611	9–1
11	November 23; 6:30 p.m. CST	@ Orlando	L 94–117	Olajuwon (27)	Olajuwon, Thorpe (10)	Maxwell (6)	Orlando Arena; 16,010	9–2
12	November 26; 7:30 p.m. CST	Seattle	L 94–98	Maxwell (23)	Olajuwon, Thorpe (13)	Smith (7)	The Summit; 16,611	9–3
13	November 29; 7:30 p.m. CST	Denver	W 96–81	Olajuwon (27)	Olajuwon (12)	Smith (9)	The Summit; 14,295	10–3

December: 8–6 (home: 5–3; road: 3–3)

Game	Date	Team	Score	High points	High rebounds	High assists	Location Attendance	Record
14	December 1; 9:30 p.m. CST	@ Golden State	W 113–109	Olajuwon (37)	Olajuwon (13)	Olajuwon (12)	Oakland-Alameda County Coliseum Arena; 15,025	11–3
15	December 2; 9:30 p.m. CST	@ L.A. Lakers	L 89–107	Herrera (22)	Herrera (11)	Cassell (5)	Great Western Forum; 13,056	11–4
16	December 6; 7:00 p.m. CST	@ Seattle	L 90–103	Thorpe (21)	Horry (10)	Cassell (7)	Tacoma Dome; 13,017	11–5
17	December 8; 7:30 p.m. CST	Charlotte	W 101–95	Smith (25)	Thorpe (15)	Cassell, Olajuwon (8)	The Summit; 12,792	12–5
18	December 10; 7:30 p.m. CST	San Antonio	L 96–108	Olajuwon (20)	Thorpe (14)	Maxwell (7)	The Summit; 16,611	12–6
19	December 13; 7:30 p.m. CST	Washington	W 93–85	Thorpe (27)	Olajuwon, Thorpe (14)	Maxwell, Smith (7)	The Summit; 13,889	13–6
20	December 15; 7:30 p.m. CST	L.A. Lakers	L 94–97	Olajuwon (22)	Thorpe (16)	Cassell (8)	The Summit; 11,943	13–7
21	December 17; 7:30 p.m. CST	Boston	L 109–112	Maxwell (25)	Olajuwon (12)	Smith (7)	The Summit; 15,757	13–8
22	December 22; 7:00 p.m. CST	Phoenix	W 114–106	Smith (25)	Olajuwon (15)	Maxwell, Smith (7)	The Summit; 16,611	14–8
23	December 23; 7:30 p.m. CST	@ San Antonio	L 96–98	Maxwell (27)	Thorpe (13)	Cassell, Smith (4)	Alamodome; 31,514	14–9
24	December 26; 6:30 p.m. CST	@ Miami	W 101–88	Olajuwon (24)	Olajuwon (12)	Maxwell, Olajuwon (5)	Miami Arena; 15,200	15–9
25	December 27; 7:30 p.m. CST	Atlanta	W 105–93	Olajuwon (35)	Olajuwon (16)	Olajuwon (8)	The Summit; 16,394	16–9
26	December 29; 7:30 p.m. CST	Golden State	W 126–124	Olajuwon (42)	Olajuwon (8)	Cassell (10)	The Summit; 16,611	17–9
27	December 30; 8:00 p.m. CST	@ Utah	W 111–103	Olajuwon (37)	Olajuwon (12)	Olajuwon (7)	Delta Center; 19,911	18–9

January: 8–6 (home: 5–2; road: 3–4)

Game	Date	Team	Score	High points	High rebounds	High assists	Location Attendance	Record
28	January 3; 7:30 p.m. CST	@ Dallas	W 110–98	Olajuwon (41)	Olajuwon (13)	Cassell, Maxwell (6)	Reunion Arena; 17,502	19–9
29	January 5; 7:30 p.m. CST	Dallas	W 108–99	Olajuwon (33)	Herrera, Horry (8)	Maxwell (9)	The Summit; 16,611	20–9
30	January 7; 7:30 p.m. CST	Indiana	L 83–88	Olajuwon (27)	Olajuwon (15)	Cassell (6)	The Summit; 16,611	20–10
31	January 11; 7:30 p.m. CST	Miami	W 108–97	Smith (27)	Olajuwon (11)	Maxwell (7)	The Summit; 12,424	21–10
32	January 13; 7:30 p.m. CST	San Antonio	W 103–100	Olajuwon (47)	Olajuwon (10)	Horry (9)	The Summit; 16,611	22–10
33	January 14; 8:00 p.m. CST	@ Denver	L 104–118	Olajuwon (41)	Thorpe (13)	Maxwell (5)	McNichols Sports Arena; 17,171	22–11
34	January 16; 7:00 p.m. CST	@ Minnesota	L 75–94	Olajuwon (22)	Olajuwon (8)	Smith (6)	Target Center; 12,442	22–12
35	January 19; 7:00 p.m. CST	New York	L 77–93	Olajuwon (28)	Olajuwon (17)	Cassell, Maxwell, Olajuwon (5)	The Summit; 16,611	22–13
36	January 20; 7:00 p.m. CST	@ Detroit	W 106–96	Olajuwon (34)	Olajuwon (12)	Cassell (9)	The Palace of Auburn Hills; 21,454	23–13
37	January 22; 12 Noon CST	@ Chicago	L 81–100	Horry (19)	Olajuwon (14)	Maxwell (5)	United Center; 22,647	23–14
38	January 24; 7:30 p.m. CST	@ Milwaukee	W 115–99	Olajuwon (31)	Olajuwon (9)	Horry (9)	Bradley Center; 14,556	24–14
39	January 26; 7:30 p.m. CST	@ San Antonio	L 100–103	Olajuwon (36)	Olajuwon (14)	Maxwell (5)	Alamodome; 33,360	24–15
40	January 28; 7:30 p.m. CST	Minnesota	W 114–93	Olajuwon (25)	Thorpe (9)	Maxwell (9)	The Summit; 16,611	25–15
41	January 31; 7:30 p.m. CST	Denver	W 86–74	Olajuwon (25)	Olajuwon (13)	Cassell (10)	The Summit; 14,761	26–15

February: 9–5 (home: 5–1; road: 4–4)

Game	Date	Team	Score	High points	High rebounds	High assists	Location Attendance	Record
42	February 2; 7:30 p.m. CST	Utah	W 121–101	Olajuwon (40)	Thorpe (8)	Maxwell (10)	The Summit; 16,611	27–15
43	February 5; 2:30 p.m. CST	@ Phoenix	W 124–100	Olajuwon (28)	Olajuwon (11)	Cassell, Maxwell (7)	America West Arena; 19,023	28–15
44	February 6; 9:00 p.m. CST	@ Portland	L 82–120	Olajuwon (22)	Olajuwon (11)	Smith (5)	Memorial Coliseum; 12,888	28–16
45	February 8; 9:30 p.m. CST	@ Sacramento	W 97–86	Olajuwon (31)	Olajuwon (17)	Elie (6)	ARCO Arena; 17,317	29–16
46	February 9; 9:30 p.m. CST	@ L.A. Clippers	L 107–122	Olajuwon (34)	Olajuwon (7)	Cassell (10)	Los Angeles Memorial Sports Arena; 7,178	29–17
All-Star Break
47	February 14; 7:30 p.m. CST	L.A. Clippers	W 124–104	Olajuwon (26)	Chilcutt (11)	Smith (11)	The Summit; 15,071	30–17
48	February 16; 7:00 p.m. CST	@ Charlotte	W 105–89	Olajuwon (29)	Olajuwon (14)	Cassell, Olajuwon(6)	Charlotte Coliseum; 23,698	31–17
49	February 17; 6:30 p.m. CST	@ Washington	W 109–92	Olajuwon (30)	Chilcutt (14)	Drexler (9)	USAir Arena; 18,756	32–17
50	February 19; 12 Noon CST	@ New York	L 117–122	Olajuwon (27)	Drexler (10)	Cassell (10)	Madison Square Garden; 19,763	32–18
51	February 21; 7:00 p.m. CST	San Antonio	L 97–98	Olajuwon (30)	Olajuwon (10)	Cassell (9)	The Summit; 16,611	32–19
52	February 23; 7:30 p.m. CST	Detroit	W 110–99	Olajuwon (36)	Olajuwon (12)	Horry (9)	The Summit; 16,611	33–19
53	February 25; 7:30 p.m. CST	Golden State	W 112–105	Olajuwon (38)	Olajuwon (15)	Cassell (16)	The Summit; 16,611	34–19
54	February 27; 7:30 p.m. CST	Cleveland	W 86–78	Olajuwon (20)	Olajuwon (11)	Cassell, Olajuwon (6)	The Summit; 14,253	35–19
55	February 28; 7:30 p.m. CST	@ Dallas	L 101–102	Drexler (24)	Brown (10)	Drexler (6)	Reunion Arena; 17,502	35–20

March: 7–8 (home: 3–5; road: 4–3)

Game	Date	Team	Score	High points	High rebounds	High assists	Location Attendance	Record
56	March 2; 8:45 p.m. CST	Orlando	L 96–107	Drexler (25)	Brown (11)	Elie (7)	The Summit; 16,611	35–21
57	March 3; 7:00 p.m. CST	@ Minnesota	L 105–108	Olajuwon (28)	Olajuwon (13)	Cassell (8)	Target Center; 17,068	35–22
58	March 5; 12 Noon CST	@ San Antonio	L 103–124	Olajuwon (25)	Drexler (8)	Cassell, Elie, Maxwell, Smith (4)	Alamodome; 35,818	35–23
59	March 7; 7:00 p.m. CST	Phoenix	L 102–113	Olajuwon (40)	Olajuwon (13)	Smith (7)	The Summit; 16,611	35–24
60	March 11; 7:30 p.m. CST	Dallas	W 109–102	Drexler (36)	Olajuwon (12)	Cassell (6)	The Summit; 16,611	36–24
61	March 13; 6:30 p.m. CST	@ Atlanta	W 97–86	Olajuwon (31)	Harrera, Olajuwon (11)	Cassell, Maxwell (6)	The Omni; 11,746	37–24
62	March 14; 6:30 p.m. CST	@ Philadelphia	W 136–107	Drexler (26)	Brown (10)	Smith (9)	CoreStates Spectrum; 11,484	38–24
63	March 16; 7:30 p.m. CST	Minnesota	W 104–97	Smith (23)	Herrera (9)	Drexler (6)	The Summit; 10,711	39–24
64	March 19; 2:30 p.m. CST	Philadelphia	W 114–103	Olajuwon (24)	Herrera, Olajuwon (9)	Cassell (10)	The Summit; 16,611	40–24
65	March 21; 7:30 p.m. CST	Seattle	L 102–104	Drexler (22)	Brown, Olajuwon (8)	Drexler (6)	The Summit; 16,611	40–25
66	March 23; 7:30 p.m. CST	Utah	L 104–112	Olajuwon (33)	Drexler, Olajuwon (9)	Olajuwon (6)	The Summit; 16,611	40–26
67	March 24; 8:00 p.m. CST	@ Phoenix	W 99–97	Smith (26)	Olajuwon (11)	Maxwell, Olajuwon, Smith (6)	America West Arena; 19,023	41–26
68	March 26; 8:30 p.m. CST	@ L.A. Lakers	L 96–107	Drexler (21)	Olajuwon (12)	Drexler, Smith (4)	Great Western Forum; 17,505	41–27
69	March 28; 7:30 p.m. CST	L.A. Lakers	L 96–106	Herrera (22)	Chilcutt (8)	Drexler, Smith (8)	The Summit; 16,611	41–28
70	March 30; 9:30 p.m. CST	@ L.A. Clippers	W 108–96	Drexler (41)	Drexler (18)	Cassell, Drexler (4)	Los Angeles Memorial Sports Arena; 11,561	42–28

April: 5–7 (home: 3–3; road: 2–4)

Game	Date	Team	Score	High points	High rebounds	High assists	Location Attendance	Record
71	April 1; 7:30 p.m. CST	Milwaukee	L 87–93	Drexler (23)	Herrera (9)	Smith (6)	The Summit; 16,611	42–29
72	April 4; 9:30 p.m. CDT	@ Sacramento	L 105–109	Drexler (29)	Drexler (8)	Drexler, Smith (3)	ARCO Arena; 17,317	42–30
73	April 6; 9:30 p.m. CDT	@ Golden State	W 110–102	Drexler (40)	Herrera (9)	Drexler (8)	Oakland-Alameda County Coliseum Arena; 15,025	43–30
74	April 7; 9:00 p.m. CDT	@ Portland	L 109–127	Cassell (31)	Drexler (10)	Drexler, Horry (6)	Memorial Coliseum; 12,888	43–31
75	April 9; 2:30 p.m. CDT	@ Denver	W 123–120	Drexler (34)	Drexler (13)	Cassell (6)	McNichols Sports Arena; 17,171	44–31
76	April 11; 7:30 p.m. CDT	Dallas	L 147–156 (2OT)	Drexler, Smith (29)	Brown (14)	Drexler (11)	The Summit; 16,431	44–32
77	April 13; 7:30 p.m. CDT	Portland	W 112–99	Olajuwon (35)	Olajuwon (10)	Smith (8)	The Summit; 16,611	45–32
78	April 15; 7:30 p.m. CDT	Sacramento	W 98–84	Smith (18)	Olajuwon (13)	Smith (4)	The Summit; 16,611	46–32
79	April 17; 7:30 p.m. CDT	L.A. Clippers	W 121–111	Olajuwon (30)	Olajuwon (9)	Cassell (8)	The Summit; 16,027	47–32
80	April 19; 8:00 p.m. CDT	@ Utah	L 96–115	Olajuwon (30)	Olajuwon (10)	Olajuwon, Smith (4)	Delta Center; 19,911	47–33
81	April 20; 9:00 p.m. CDT	@ Seattle	L 101–111	Olajuwon (26)	Olajuwon (8)	Cassell (4)	Tacoma Dome; 18,056	47–34
82	April 23; 6:00 p.m. CDT	Utah	L 97–103	Maxwell (26)	Tabak (8)	Maxwell (4)	The Summit; 16,611	47–35

1994–95 schedule

=== Playoffs ===
1995 playoff game log
Western Conference First Round: 3–2 (home: 1–1; road: 2–1)

Game	Date	Team	Score	High points	High rebounds	High assists	Location Attendance	Series
1	April 27; 8:30 p.m. CDT	@ Utah	L 100–102	Olajuwon (45)	Chilcutt (9)	Olajuwon (9)	Delta Center; 19,911	0–1
2	April 29; 8:30 p.m. CDT	@ Utah	W 140–126	Smith (32)	Olajuwon, Horry (7)	Smith (9)	Delta Center; 19,911	1–1
3	May 3; 8:30 p.m. CDT	Utah	L 82–95	Olajuwon (30)	Olajuwon (10)	Horry, Smith (5)	The Summit; 16,611	1–2
4	May 5; 8:30 p.m. CDT	Utah	W 123–106	Drexler (41)	Drexler (9)	Drexler, Smith (6)	The Summit; 16,611	2–2
5	May 7; 2:00 p.m. CST	@ Utah	W 95–91	Olajuwon (33)	Olajuwon, Drexler (10)	Olajuwon, Cassell (4)	Delta Center; 19,911	3–2

Western Conference Semifinals: 4–3 (home: 2–1; road: 2–2)

Game	Date	Team	Score	High points	High rebounds	High assists	Location Attendance	Series
1	May 9; 9:30 p.m. CDT	@ Phoenix	L 108–130	Olajuwon (18)	Brown (6)	Smith (10)	America West Arena; 19,023	0–1
2	May 11; 9:30 p.m. CDT	@ Phoenix	L 94–118	Olajuwon (25)	Horry (8)	Drexler (7)	America West Arena; 19,023	0–2
3	May 13; 12 Noon CDT	Phoenix	W 118–85	Olajuwon (36)	Olajuwon (11)	Drexler (8)	The Summit; 16,611	1–2
4	May 14; 12 Noon CDT	Phoenix	L 110–114	Olajuwon (38)	Horry (17)	Cassell (9)	The Summit; 16,611	1–3
5	May 16; 9:30 p.m. CDT	@ Phoenix	W 103–97 (OT)	Olajuwon (31)	Olajuwon (16)	Smith (7)	America West Arena; 19,023	2–3
6	May 18; 7:30 p.m. CDT	Phoenix	W 116–103	Olajuwon (30)	Olajuwon, Drexler (8)	Olajuwon (10)	The Summit; 16,611	3–3
7	May 20; 2:30 p.m. CDT	@ Phoenix	W 115–114	Olajuwon, Drexler (29)	Olajuwon (11)	Cassell (7)	America West Arena; 19,023	4–3

Western Conference Finals: 4–2 (home: 1–2; road: 3–0)

Game	Date	Team	Score	High points	High rebounds	High assists	Location Attendance	Series
1	May 22; 7:30 p.m. CDT	@ San Antonio	W 94–93	Olajuwon (27)	Drexler (12)	Olajuwon (6)	Alamodome; 33,337	1–0
2	May 24; 7:30 p.m. CDT	@ San Antonio	W 106–96	Olajuwon (41)	Olajuwon (16)	Elie, Cassell (7)	Alamodome; 35,888	2–0
3	May 26; 8:00 p.m. CDT	San Antonio	L 102–107	Olajuwon (43)	Olajuwon (11)	Drexler (9)	The Summit; 16,611	2–1
4	May 28; 2:30 p.m. CDT	San Antonio	L 81–103	Olajuwon (20)	Olajuwon (14)	Olajuwon (5)	The Summit; 16,611	2–2
5	May 30; 8:00 p.m. CDT	@ San Antonio	W 111–90	Olajuwon (42)	Horry (13)	Cassell (12)	Alamodome; 35,888	3–2
6	June 1; 8:00 p.m. CDT	San Antonio	W 100–95	Olajuwon (39)	Olajuwon (17)	Drexler (7)	The Summit; 16,611	4–2

NBA Finals: 4–0 (home: 2–0; road: 2–0)

Game	Date	Team	Score	High points	High rebounds	High assists	Location Attendance	Series
1	June 7; 8:00 p.m. CDT	@ Orlando	W 120–118 (OT)	Olajuwon (31)	Drexler (11)	Smith (9)	Orlando Arena; 16,010	1–0
2	June 9; 8:00 p.m. CDT	@ Orlando	W 117–106	Olajuwon (34)	Olajuwon (11)	Drexler (5)	Orlando Arena; 16,010	2–0
3	June 11; 6:30 p.m. CDT	Orlando	W 106–103	Olajuwon (31)	Olajuwon (14)	Drexler, Olajuwon (7)	The Summit; 16,611	3–0
4	June 14; 8:00 p.m. CDT	Orlando	W 113–101	Olajuwon (35)	Olajuwon (15)	Drexler (8)	The Summit; 16,611	4–0

1995 schedule

== Player stats ==
Legend
GP	Games played	GS	Games started	MPG	Minutes per game
FG%	Field-goal percentage	3P%	3-point field-goal percentage	FT%	Free-throw percentage
RPG	Rebounds per game	APG	Assists per game	SPG	Steals per game
BPG	Blocks per game	PPG	Points per game

=== Regular season ===
Player	GP	GS	MPG	FG%	3P%	FT%	RPG	APG	SPG	BPG	PPG
Tim Breaux	42	2	8.1	.372	.240	.653	.8	.4	.26	.10	3.0
Scott Brooks	28	0	6.6	.538	.471	.857	.5	.8	.29	.04	3.4
Chucky Brown	41	14	19.9	.603	.333	.613	4.6	.7	.27	.34	6.1
Adrian Caldwell	7	0	4.3	.250	.000	.500	1.4	.0	.14	.00	.7
Sam Cassell	82	1	23.0	.427	.330	.843	2.6	4.9	1.15	.17	9.5
Pete Chilcutt	68	17	19.8	.445	.407	.738	4.7	1.0	.37	.63	5.3
Clyde Drexler	35	34	37.1	.506	.357	.809	7.0	4.4	1.77	.66	21.4
Mario Elie	81	13	23.4	.499	.398	.842	2.4	2.3	.80	.15	8.8
Carl Herrera	61	26	21.8	.523	.000	.624	4.6	.7	.66	.62	6.8
Robert Horry	64	61	32.4	.447	.379	.761	5.1	3.4	1.47	1.19	10.2
Charles Jones	3	0	12.0	.333	.000	.500	2.3	.0	.00	.33	1.0
Vernon Maxwell	64	54	31.8	.394	.324	.688	2.6	4.3	1.17	.20	13.3
Tracy Murray	25	0	8.1	.400	.422	.625	.9	.2	.28	.12	3.5
Hakeem Olajuwon	72	72	39.6	.517	.188	.756	10.8	3.5	1.85	3.36	27.8
Kenny Smith	81	81	25.1	.484	.429	.851	1.9	4.0	.88	.12	10.4
Žan Tabak	37	0	4.9	.453	.000	.614	1.5	.1	.05	.19	2.0
Otis Thorpe	36	35	33.0	.563	.000	.528	8.9	1.6	.61	.36	13.3

=== Playoffs ===
Player	GP	GS	MPG	FG%	3P%	FT%	RPG	APG	SPG	BPG	PPG
Chucky Brown	21	1	15.5	.447	.500	.676	3.1	.3	.43	.10	4.5
Sam Cassell	22	0	22.0	.438	.400	.835	1.9	4.0	.95	.09	11.0
Pete Chilcutt	20	15	16.2	.484	.389	.824	2.9	.9	.35	.20	4.5
Clyde Drexler	22	22	38.6	.481	.303	.786	7.0	5.0	1.50	.68	20.5
Mario Elie	22	6	28.9	.504	.431	.795	2.8	2.5	.95	.05	9.1
Carl Herrera	1	0	6.0	1.000	.000	.000	.0	1.0	.00	.00	2.0
Robert Horry	22	22	38.2	.445	.400	.744	7.0	3.5	1.45	1.18	13.1
Charles Jones	19	0	12.5	.385	.000	.333	2.3	.0	.21	.53	.7
Vernon Maxwell	1	0	16.0	.143	.000	1.000	3.0	1.0	.00	.00	3.0
Hakeem Olajuwon	22	22	42.2	.531	.500	.681	10.3	4.5	1.18	2.82	33.0
Kenny Smith	22	22	29.6	.438	.442	.900	2.2	4.5	.64	.14	10.8
Žan Tabak	8	0	3.9	.400	.000	1.000	.1	.1	.12	.38	.8

Player statistics citation:

== Playoffs ==
=== West First Round ===
(3) Utah Jazz vs. (6) Houston Rockets: Rockets win series 3-2

- Game 1 @ Delta Center, Salt Lake City (April 27): Utah 102, Houston 100
- Game 2 @ Delta Center, Salt Lake City (April 29): Houston 140, Utah 126
- Game 3 @ The Summit, Houston (May 3): Utah 95, Houston 82
- Game 4 @ The Summit, Houston (May 5): Houston 123, Utah 106
- Game 5 @ Delta Center, Salt Lake City (May 7): Houston 95, Utah 91

Last Playoff Meeting: 1994 Western Conference Finals (Houston won 4–1)

=== West Conference semifinals ===
(2) Phoenix Suns vs. (6) Houston Rockets: Rockets win series 4-3

- Game 1 @ America West Arena, Phoenix (May 9): Phoenix 130, Houston 108
- Game 2 @ America West Arena, Phoenix (May 11): Phoenix 118, Houston 94
- Game 3 @ The Summit, Houston (May 13): Houston 118, Phoenix 85
- Game 4 @ The Summit, Houston (May 14): Phoenix 114, Houston 110
- Game 5 @ America West Arena, Phoenix (May 16): Houston 103, Phoenix 97 (OT)
- Game 6 @ The Summit, Houston (May 18): Houston 116, Phoenix 103
- Game 7 @ America West Arena, Phoenix (May 20): Houston 115, Phoenix 114

Last Playoff Meeting: 1994 Western Conference Semifinals (Houston won 4–3)

=== West Conference finals ===
(1) San Antonio Spurs vs. (6) Houston Rockets: Rockets win series 4-2

- Game 1 @ Alamodome, San Antonio (May 22): Houston 94, San Antonio 93
- Game 2 @ Alamodome, San Antonio (May 24): Houston 106, San Antonio 96
- Game 3 @ The Summit, Houston (May 26): San Antonio 107, Houston 102
- Game 4 @ The Summit, Houston (May 28): San Antonio 103, Houston 81
- Game 5 @ Alamodome, San Antonio (May 30): Houston 111, San Antonio 90
- Game 6 @ The Summit, Houston (June 1): Houston 100, San Antonio 95

Last Playoff Meeting: 1981 Western Conference Semifinals (Houston won 4–3)

=== NBA Finals ===
==== 1995 NBA Finals Roster ====
Head Coach: Rudy Tomjanovich
Hakeem Olajuwon | Clyde Drexler | Kenny Smith | Robert Horry | Sam Cassell | Mario Elie | Carl Herrera | Vernon Maxwell | Chucky Brown | Pete Chilcutt | Tracy Murray | Tim Breaux | Žan Tabak | Charles Jones | Adrian Caldwell |

==== Olajuwon vs. O'Neal ====
Although both centers played well, Olajuwon is generally considered to have outplayed O'Neal. Olajuwon outscored O'Neal in every game of the series and became one of the few players in NBA history to score at least 30 points in every game of an NBA Finals series:

1995 NBA Finals	Gm 1	Gm 2	Gm 3	Gm 4	Totals
Hakeem Olajuwon	31	34	31	35	32.8 ppg
Shaquille O'Neal	26	33	28	25	28.0 ppg

By winning his second straight NBA Finals MVP award, Hakeem Olajuwon became the sixth player to do so on multiple occasions, joining Willis Reed, Kareem Abdul-Jabbar, Magic Johnson, Larry Bird and Michael Jordan. Olajuwon also joined Jordan as the only two players to win the award consecutively as of that time.

==== Series Summary ====
Game	Date	Home team	Result	Road team
Game 1	June 7	Orlando	118–120	Houston
Game 2	June 9	Orlando	106–117	Houston
Game 3	June 11	Houston	106–103	Orlando
Game 4	June 14	Houston	113–101	Orlando

Rockets win series 4–0

== Award winners ==
- Hakeem Olajuwon – NBA Finals Most Valuable Player
- Hakeem Olajuwon – All-NBA Third Team
