= 1994–95 Dallas Mavericks season =

NBA professional basketball team season

- Head coach: Dick Motta
- General manager: Norm Sonju
- Owner: Don Carter
- Arena: Reunion Arena

Results
- Record: 36–46 (.439)
- Place: Division: 5th (Midwest); Conference: 10th (Western)
- Playoff finish: Did not qualify
- Stats at Basketball Reference

Local media
- Television: KTVT; Prime Sports Southwest
- Radio: WBAP

The 1994–95 Dallas Mavericks season was the 15th season for the Dallas Mavericks in the National Basketball Association.

== Season summary ==
=== Off-season ===
With the hopes of repeating history, the Mavericks brought back original head coach Dick Motta to restore a team that had compiled an awful 24–140 record over the last two years. The Mavericks received the second overall pick in the 1994 NBA draft, and selected point guard Jason Kidd from the University of California. Meanwhile, former Sixth Man Roy Tarpley returned after being suspended by the NBA three years ago.

=== Regular season ===
Under Motta, and with the addition of Kidd to form a new trio along with second-year star Jamal Mashburn, and Jim Jackson, the Mavericks got off to a 12–8 start to the regular season. However, the team soon fell below .500 in winning percentage, posted an eight-game losing streak in January, and later on held an 18–28 record at the All-Star break. At mid-season, the team signed free agent George McCloud, and acquired Scott Brooks from the Houston Rockets. The Mavericks posted a six-game winning streak in March, and finished in fifth place in the Midwest Division with a 36–46 record, which was a 23-game improvement over the previous season, and twelve more wins then their previous two seasons combined. However, the team missed the NBA playoffs for the fifth consecutive year.

Kidd averaged 11.7 points, 5.4 rebounds, 7.7 assists and 1.9 steals per game, as he was named the co-NBA Rookie of the Year along with Grant Hill of the Detroit Pistons, and was also named to the NBA All-Rookie First Team. In addition, Jackson averaged 25.7 points, 5.1 rebounds and 3.7 assists per game, but only played 51 games due to a season-ending ankle injury, while Mashburn provided the team with 24.1 points and 3.7 assists per game, and also led them with 113 three-point field goals, and Tarpley contributed 12.6 points and 8.2 rebounds per game off the bench, but only played 55 games due to foot and knee injuries. Meanwhile, second-year forward Popeye Jones averaged 10.3 points and 10.6 rebounds per game, McCloud contributed 9.6 points and 3.5 rebounds per game in 42 games, second-year guard Lucious Harris contributed 9.5 points per game, Brooks provided with 7.9 points and 3.0 assists per game in 30 games, and defensive center Lorenzo Williams averaged 4.0 points, 8.4 rebounds and 1.8 blocks per game.

During the NBA All-Star weekend at the America West Arena in Phoenix, Arizona, Kidd was selected for the NBA Rookie Game, as a member of the Green team, while rookie shooting guard, and first-round draft pick Tony Dumas participated in the NBA Slam Dunk Contest. Despite stellar seasons, neither Jackson or Mashburn were selected for the 1995 NBA All-Star Game. Kidd also finished in 13th place in Most Valuable Player voting, while Jones finished tied in seventh place in Most Improved Player voting, with Jackson finishing tied in ninth place, and Motta finished in fifth place in Coach of the Year voting.

The Mavericks finished 13th in the NBA in home-game attendance, with an attendance of 678,433 at the Reunion Arena during the regular season.

=== Aftermath ===
Following the season, Doug Smith, who failed to live up to expectations as a top draft pick after four seasons with the Mavericks, was left unprotected in the 1995 NBA expansion draft, where he was selected by the Toronto Raptors expansion team.

== Offseason ==
=== Draft picks ===
Round	Pick	Player	Position	Nationality	College
1	2	Jason Kidd	PG	United States	California
1	19	Tony Dumas	SG	United States	Missouri–Kansas City
2	28	Deon Thomas	F	United States	Illinois

== Roster ==
1994–95 Dallas Mavericks roster
Players

Pos.	No.	Player	Height	Weight	DOB	From
G	1	Scott Brooks	5 ft 11 in (1.80 m)	165 lb (75 kg)	1965–07–31	UC Irvine
F	43	Terry Davis	6 ft 9 in (2.06 m)	225 lb (102 kg)	1967–06–17	Virginia Union
G	7	Tony Dumas	6 ft 6 in (1.98 m)	190 lb (86 kg)	1972–08–25	UMKC
G	30	Lucious Harris	6 ft 5 in (1.96 m)	190 lb (86 kg)	1970–12–18	Long Beach State
C	35	Donald Hodge	7 ft 0 in (2.13 m)	230 lb (104 kg)	1969–02–25	Temple
G	24	Jim Jackson (injured)	6 ft 6 in (1.98 m)	220 lb (100 kg)	1970–10–14	Ohio State
F	54	Popeye Jones	6 ft 8 in (2.03 m)	250 lb (113 kg)	1970–06–17	Murray State
G	5	Jason Kidd	6 ft 4 in (1.93 m)	205 lb (93 kg)	1973–03–23	California
F	32	Jamal Mashburn	6 ft 8 in (2.03 m)	240 lb (109 kg)	1972–11–29	Kentucky
F	21	George McCloud	6 ft 6 in (1.98 m)	205 lb (93 kg)	1967–05–27	Florida State
F	34	Doug Smith	6 ft 10 in (2.08 m)	220 lb (100 kg)	1969–09–17	Missouri
C	42	Roy Tarpley	6 ft 11 in (2.11 m)	230 lb (104 kg)	1964–11–28	Michigan
C	44	Lorenzo Williams	6 ft 9 in (2.06 m)	200 lb (91 kg)	1969–07–15	Stetson

Coaches
Head coach
- Dick Motta
Assistant(s)
- Brad Davis
- Kip Motta

Legend
- (DP) Unsigned draft pick
- (FA) Free agent
- (S) Suspended
- (L) On leave from the team
- Injured

Roster
Updated: February 23, 1995

== Regular season ==
=== Season standings ===
Midwest Division	W	L	PCT	GB	Home	Road	Div
z-San Antonio Spurs	62	20	.756	—	33–8	29–12	20–6
x-Utah Jazz	60	22	.732	2	33–8	27–14	17–9
x-Houston Rockets	47	35	.573	15	25–16	22–19	13–13
x-Denver Nuggets	41	41	.500	21	23–18	18–23	13–13
Dallas Mavericks	36	46	.439	26	19–22	17–24	11–15
Minnesota Timberwolves	21	61	.256	41	13–28	8–33	4–22

#	Western Conference				
#	Team	W	L	PCT	GB
1	z-San Antonio Spurs	62	20	.756	–
2	y-Phoenix Suns	59	23	.720	3
3	x-Utah Jazz	60	22	.732	2
4	x-Seattle SuperSonics	57	25	.695	5
5	x-Los Angeles Lakers	48	34	.585	14
6	x-Houston Rockets	47	35	.573	15
7	x-Portland Trail Blazers	44	38	.537	18
8	x-Denver Nuggets	41	41	.500	21
9	Sacramento Kings	39	43	.476	23
10	Dallas Mavericks	36	46	.439	26
11	Golden State Warriors	26	56	.317	36
12	Minnesota Timberwolves	21	61	.256	41
13	Los Angeles Clippers	17	65	.207	45

z - clinched division title
y - clinched division title
x - clinched playoff spot

=== Game log ===
1994–95 game log
Total: 36–46 (Home: 19–22; Road: 17–24)
November: 7–4 (home: 4–2; road: 3–2)

Game	Date	Team	Score	High points	High rebounds	High assists	Location Attendance	Record

December: 6–8 (home: 3–5; road: 3–3)

Game	Date	Team	Score	High points	High rebounds	High assists	Location Attendance	Record

January: 3–13 (home: 2–7; road: 1–6)

Game	Date	Team	Score	High points	High rebounds	High assists	Location Attendance	Record
26	January 3, 1995; 7:30 p.m. CST	Houston	L 98–110	Jackson (27)	Tarpley (12)	Kidd (11)	Reunion Arena; 17,502	13–13
27	January 5, 1995; 7:30 p.m. CST	@ Houston	L 99–108	Jackson (26)	Tarpley (13)	Kidd (8)	The Summit; 16,611	13–14

February: 5–7 (home: 3–3; road: 2–4)

Game	Date	Team	Score	High points	High rebounds	High assists	Location Attendance	Record
All-Star Break
53	February 28, 1995; 7:30 p.m. CST	Houston	W 102–101	Mashburn (22)	Williams (13)	Kidd (7)	Reunion Arena; 17,502	21–32

March: 10–6 (home: 4–2; road: 6–4)

Game	Date	Team	Score	High points	High rebounds	High assists	Location Attendance	Record
58	March 11, 1995; 7:30 p.m. CST	@ Houston	L 102–109	Mashburn (33)	Jones (14)	Kidd (7)	The Summit; 16,611	22–36

April: 5–8 (home: 3–3; road: 2–5)

Game	Date	Team	Score	High points	High rebounds	High assists	Location Attendance	Record
75	April 11, 1995; 7:30 p.m. CDT	@ Houston	W 156–147 (2OT)	Mashburn (42)	Jones (21)	Kidd (10)	The Summit; 16,431	34–41

1994–95 schedule

== Player statistics ==
=== Ragular season ===
Player	POS	GP	GS	MP	REB	AST	STL	BLK	PTS	MPG	RPG	APG	SPG	BPG	PPG
Lorenzo Williams	C	82	81	2,383	690	124	52	148	328	29.1	8.4	1.5	.6	1.8	4.0
Jamal Mashburn	SF	80	80	2,980	331	298	82	8	1,926	37.3	4.1	3.7	1.0	.1	24.1
Popeye Jones	PF	80	80	2,385	844	163	35	27	825	29.8	10.6	2.0	.4	.3	10.3
Jason Kidd	PG	79	79	2,668	430	607	151	24	922	33.8	5.4	7.7	1.9	.3	11.7
Lucious Harris	SG	79	31	1,695	220	132	58	14	751	21.5	2.8	1.7	.7	.2	9.5
Doug Smith	PF	63	0	826	144	44	29	26	320	13.1	2.3	.7	.5	.4	5.1
Tony Dumas	SG	58	0	613	62	57	13	4	264	10.6	1.1	1.0	.2	.1	4.6
Roy Tarpley	C	55	1	1,354	449	58	45	55	691	24.6	8.2	1.1	.8	1.0	12.6
Donald Hodge	C	54	0	633	122	41	10	14	209	11.7	2.3	.8	.2	.3	3.9
Jim Jackson	SG	51	51	1,982	260	191	28	12	1,309	38.9	5.1	3.7	.5	.2	25.7
Terry Davis	PF	46	2	580	156	10	6	3	140	12.6	3.4	.2	.1	.1	3.0
George McCloud	SF	42	3	802	147	53	23	9	402	19.1	3.5	1.3	.5	.2	9.6
Morlon Wiley^{†}	PG	38	2	407	39	69	21	1	130	10.7	1.0	1.8	.6	.0	3.4
Scott Brooks^{†}	PG	31	0	622	53	94	26	3	245	20.1	1.7	3.0	.8	.1	7.9

- ^{†} Denotes player spent time with another team in the season. Stats reflect time with the Mavericks only.

== Awards and records ==
- Jason Kidd, NBA Rookie of the Year Award
- Jason Kidd, NBA All-Rookie Team 1st Team

== See also ==
- 1994–95 NBA season
