= 1994–95 Sacramento Kings season =

NBA professional basketball team season

- Head coach: Garry St. Jean
- President: Geoff Petrie
- General manager: Geoff Petrie
- Owner: Jim Thomas
- Arena: ARCO Arena

Results
- Record: 39–43 (.476)
- Place: Division: 5th (Pacific); Conference: 9th (Western)
- Playoff finish: Did not qualify
- Stats at Basketball Reference

Local media
- Television: KPWB; SportsChannel Pacific
- Radio: KHTK

The 1994–95 Sacramento Kings season was the 46th season for the Sacramento Kings in the National Basketball Association, and their tenth season in Sacramento, California.

== Season summary ==
=== Off-season ===
The Kings received the eighth overall pick in the 1994 NBA draft, and selected power forward Brian Grant out of Xavier University, and also selected power forward Michael Smith out of Providence College with the 35th overall pick. During the off-season, the team signed free agent Frank Brickowski; however, Brickowski would miss the entire regular season due to a preseason shoulder injury.

For the season, the Kings redesigned their primary logo, replacing the colors blue and red with purple, black and silver to their color scheme of white. The team's primary logo featured the team name "Kings" in white letters on a purple sign, below the city name "Sacramento" in white letters on a purple ribbon, with a silver crown, purple and silver jousting sticks, and a purple basketball with silver seams; the logo is surrounded by a black outline.

The team also redesigned their home and road uniforms, which featured purple side panels on the right leg and bottom of their shorts, and the team's primary logo on the right leg. The white home uniforms featured a purple, silver and black trim, and silver and black outlines next to the side panels on their shorts, while the road uniforms were changed from blue to black, and featured a purple and white trim, and white outlines. In addition, the Kings revealed new half-black, and half-purple alternate road uniforms, which were purple on the left side and black on the right side, and featured a black and white trim; the alternate uniforms also featured purple and white-squared checkered flag side panels with white outlines on their jerseys and shorts, and the new primary logo on the left leg of their shorts.

The team's new primary logo would remain in use until 2016, while the new home and road uniforms would both last until 2002, and the alternate jerseys would last until 1997.

=== Regular season ===
With the addition of Grant and Smith, and replacing Lionel Simmons with Walt Williams as the team's starting small forward, the Kings played above .500 in winning percentage with an 18–13 start to the regular season, and later on held a 25–20 record at the All-Star break. However, after holding a 28–20 record as of February 18, 1995, the team struggled posting a seven-game losing streak afterwards, and fell below .500 as the season progressed. On the final day of the regular season on April 23, the Kings faced off against the Denver Nuggets on the road at the McNichols Sports Arena for the eighth and final playoff spot in the Western Conference; the Nuggets won by a score of 102–89, as the Kings finished in fifth place in the Pacific Division with a 39–43 record, missing the NBA playoffs for the ninth consecutive year.

Mitch Richmond averaged 22.8 points and 3.8 assists per game, led the Kings with 156 three-point field goals, and was named to the All-NBA Second Team. In addition, Williams showed improvement, averaging 16.4 points, 4.1 assists and 1.6 steals per game, along with 103 three-point field goals, while Grant provided the team with 13.2 points, 7.5 rebounds and 1.5 blocks per game, and was named to the NBA All-Rookie First Team, Spud Webb contributed 11.6 points and 6.2 assists per game, and Olden Polynice provided with 10.8 points and 9.0 rebounds per game. Off the bench, Smith averaged 6.9 points and 5.9 rebounds per game, while Simmons provided with 5.6 points and 3.4 rebounds per game, Randy Brown contributed 4.7 points and 2.0 steals per game, second-year guard Bobby Hurley contributed 4.2 points and 3.3 assists per game, and Duane Causwell averaged 3.6 points, 3.0 rebounds and 1.4 blocks per game.

During the NBA All-Star weekend at the America West Arena in Phoenix, Arizona, Richmond was selected for the 1995 NBA All-Star Game, as a member of the Western Conference All-Star team. Richmond scored 23 points off the bench, and was named the NBA All-Star Game Most Valuable Player, as the Western Conference defeated the Eastern Conference, 139–112. Meanwhile, Grant and Smith were both selected for the NBA Rookie Game, as members of the Green team. Williams finished tied in ninth place in Most Improved Player voting, while Grant finished tied in fifth place in Rookie of the Year voting.

The Kings finished ninth in the NBA in home-game attendance, with an attendance of 709,997 at the ARCO Arena II during the regular season.

=== Aftermath ===
Following the season, Webb was traded back to his former team, the Atlanta Hawks, while Brickowski was traded back to his former team, the Seattle SuperSonics, and Brown signed with the Chicago Bulls.

== Draft picks ==
Round	Pick	Player	Position	Nationality	College
1	8	Brian Grant	PF	United States	Xavier
2	35	Michael Smith	PF	United States	Providence College
2	51	Lawrence Funderburke	PF	United States	Ohio State

== Roster ==
1994–95 Sacramento Kings roster
Players

Pos.	No.	Player	Height	Weight	DOB	From
F	–	Frank Brickowski (IN)	6 ft 9 in (2.06 m)	240 lb (109 kg)	1959–08–14	Penn State
G	3	Randy Brown	6 ft 2 in (1.88 m)	190 lb (86 kg)	1968–05–22	New Mexico State
C	31	Duane Causwell	7 ft 0 in (2.13 m)	240 lb (109 kg)	1968–05–31	Temple
F	33	Brian Grant	6 ft 9 in (2.06 m)	254 lb (115 kg)	1972–03–05	Xavier
G	7	Bobby Hurley	6 ft 0 in (1.83 m)	165 lb (75 kg)	1971–06–28	Duke
G	20	Doug Lee	6 ft 5 in (1.96 m)	200 lb (91 kg)	1964–10–24	Purdue
G	5	Derrick Phelps	6 ft 4 in (1.93 m)	181 lb (82 kg)	1972–07–31	North Carolina
C	0	Olden Polynice	6 ft 11 in (2.11 m)	220 lb (100 kg)	1964–11–21	Virginia
G	2	Mitch Richmond	6 ft 5 in (1.96 m)	215 lb (98 kg)	1965–06–30	Kansas State
F	22	Lionel Simmons	6 ft 7 in (2.01 m)	210 lb (95 kg)	1968–11–14	La Salle
F	34	Michael Smith	6 ft 8 in (2.03 m)	230 lb (104 kg)	1972–03–28	Providence
F	9	Henry Turner	6 ft 7 in (2.01 m)	200 lb (91 kg)	1966–08–18	Cal State Fullerton
G	4	Spud Webb	5 ft 6 in (1.68 m)	133 lb (60 kg)	1963–07–13	NC State
F	42	Walt Williams	6 ft 8 in (2.03 m)	219 lb (99 kg)	1970–04–16	Maryland

Coaches
Head coach
- Garry St. Jean
Assistant(s)
- Mike Bratz
- Eddie Jordan

Legend
- (DP) Unsigned draft pick
- (FA) Free agent
- (S) Suspended
- (IN) Inactive
- Injured

Roster
Updated: April 20, 1995

=== Roster Notes ===
- Power forward Frank Brickowski was on the injured reserve list due to a shoulder injury he sustained during the preseason, and missed the entire regular season.

== Regular season ==
=== Season standings ===
Pacific Division	W	L	PCT	GB	Home	Road	Div
y-Phoenix Suns	59	23	.720	—	32–9	27–14	23–7
x-Seattle SuperSonics	57	25	.695	2	32–9	25–16	16–14
x-Los Angeles Lakers	48	34	.585	11	29–12	19–22	15–15
x-Portland Trail Blazers	44	38	.537	15	26–15	18–23	17–13
Sacramento Kings	39	43	.476	20	27–14	12–29	17–13
Golden State Warriors	26	56	.317	33	15–26	11–30	11–19
Los Angeles Clippers	17	65	.207	42	13–28	4–37	6–24

#	Western Conference				
#	Team	W	L	PCT	GB
1	z-San Antonio Spurs	62	20	.756	–
2	y-Phoenix Suns	59	23	.720	3
3	x-Utah Jazz	60	22	.732	2
4	x-Seattle SuperSonics	57	25	.695	5
5	x-Los Angeles Lakers	48	34	.585	14
6	x-Houston Rockets	47	35	.573	15
7	x-Portland Trail Blazers	44	38	.537	18
8	x-Denver Nuggets	41	41	.500	21
9	Sacramento Kings	39	43	.476	23
10	Dallas Mavericks	36	46	.439	26
11	Golden State Warriors	26	56	.317	36
12	Minnesota Timberwolves	21	61	.256	41
13	Los Angeles Clippers	17	65	.207	45

z - clinched division title
y - clinched division title
x - clinched playoff spot

== Game log ==
=== Regular season ===
1994–95 game log
Total: 39–43 (Home: 27–14; Road: 12–29)
November: 6–6 (home: 4–3; road: 2–3)

Game	Date	Team	Score	High points	High rebounds	High assists	Location Attendance	Record
5	November 15, 1994; 5:30 p.m. PST	@ Houston	L 99–105	Richmond (31)	Polynice (11)	Webb (6)	The Summit; 14,656	3–2

December: 9–6 (home: 7–1; road: 2–5)

Game	Date	Team	Score	High points	High rebounds	High assists	Location Attendance	Record

January: 9–6 (home: 5–2; road: 4–4)

Game	Date	Team	Score	High points	High rebounds	High assists	Location Attendance	Record

February: 4–7 (home: 4–1; road: 0–6)

Game	Date	Team	Score	High points	High rebounds	High assists	Location Attendance	Record
45	February 8, 1995; 7:30 p.m. PST	Houston	L 86–97	Richmond (28)	Smith (8)	Webb (5)	ARCO Arena; 17,317	25–20
All-Star Break

March: 6–12 (home: 4–5; road: 2–7)

Game	Date	Team	Score	High points	High rebounds	High assists	Location Attendance	Record

April: 5–6 (home: 3–2; road: 2–4)

Game	Date	Team	Score	High points	High rebounds	High assists	Location Attendance	Record
72	April 4, 1995; 7:30 p.m. PDT	Houston	W 109–105	Williams (30)	Smith (11)	Webb (6)	ARCO Arena; 17,317	35–37
78	April 15, 1995; 5:30 p.m. PDT	@ Houston	L 84–98	Richmond, Williams (19)	Grant (9)	Brown, Williams (6)	The Summit; 16,611	46–32

1994–95 schedule

== Player statistics ==
Legend
GP	Games played	GS	Games started	MPG	Minutes per game
FG%	Field-goal percentage	3P%	3-point field-goal percentage	FT%	Free-throw percentage
RPG	Rebounds per game	APG	Assists per game	SPG	Steals per game
BPG	Blocks per game	PPG	Points per game

=== Regular season ===
Player	GP	GS	MPG	FG%	3P%	FT%	RPG	APG	SPG	BPG	PPG
Mitch Richmond	82	82	38.7	.446	.368	.843	4.4	3.8	1.1	.4	22.8
Michael Smith	82	0	21.2	.542	.000	.485	5.9	.8	.7	.6	6.9
Olden Polynice	81	81	31.3	.544	1.000	.639	9.0	.8	.6	.6	10.8
Brian Grant	80	59	28.6	.511	.250	.636	7.5	1.2	.6	1.5	13.2
Walt Williams	77	77	35.6	.446	.348	.731	4.5	4.1	1.6	.8	16.4
Spud Webb	76	76	32.3	.438	.331	.934	2.3	6.2	1.0	.1	11.6
Bobby Hurley	68	6	16.3	.363	.276	.763	1.0	3.3	.4	.0	4.2
Randy Brown	67	2	16.2	.432	.298	.671	1.6	2.0	1.5	.3	4.7
Duane Causwell	58	24	14.1	.517	.000	.582	3.0	.3	.2	1.4	3.6
Lionel Simmons	58	3	18.3	.420	.375	.702	3.4	1.5	.5	.4	5.6
Alaa Abdelnaby^{†}	51	0	9.3	.532	.000	.571	2.1	.3	.3	.2	5.0
Henry Turner	30	0	5.0	.404	.400	.571	.9	.2	.3	.0	2.3
Doug Lee	22	0	3.4	.360	.389	.857	.2	.2	.3	.1	2.0
Trevor Wilson	15	0	9.8	.450		.786	1.7	.8	.3	.1	3.1
Derrick Phelps	3	0	1.7	.000		.000	.0	.3	.0	.0	.0

- ^{†} Denotes player spent time with another team in the season. Stats reflect time with the Kings only.

Player statistics citation:

== Awards and records ==
- Mitch Richmond, All-NBA Second Team
- Brian Grant, NBA All-Rookie Team 1st Team

== Transactions ==
The Kings were involved in the following transactions during the 1994–95 season.

=== Trades ===
The Kings were not involved in any trades during the 1994–95 season.

=== Free agents ===
==== Additions ====
Player	Signed	Former team
Alaa Abdelnaby	July 26	Boston Celtics
Frank Brickowski	August 19	Charlotte Hornets
Doug Lee	October 31	KK Cibona (Croatia)
Derrick Phelps	April 20	Chicago Rockers (CBA)

==== Subtractions ====
Player	Left	New team
Wayman Tisdale	released, August 19	Phoenix Suns
LaBradford Smith	waived, October 31	Rapid City Thrillers (CBA)
Mike Peplowski	waived, November 3	Detroit Pistons
Trevor Wilson	waived, January 9	CB Peñas Huesca (LEB Oro)
Alaa Abdelnaby	waived, March 21	Philadelphia 76ers

Player Transactions Citation:

== See also ==
- 1994-95 NBA season
