= 1994–95 Denver Nuggets season =

NBA professional basketball team season

- Head coach: Dan Issel (resigned) (18–16); Gene Littles (interim) (3–13); Bernie Bickerstaff (20–12)
- President: Bernie Bickerstaff
- General manager: Bernie Bickerstaff
- Arena: McNichols Sports Arena

Results
- Record: 41–41 (.500)
- Place: Division: 4th (Midwest); Conference: 8th (Western)
- Playoff finish: First round (lost to Spurs 0–3)
- Stats at Basketball Reference

Local media
- Television: KWGN-TV; Prime Sports Rocky Mountain
- Radio: KOA

The 1994–95 Denver Nuggets season was the 19th season for the Denver Nuggets in the National Basketball Association, and their 28th season as a franchise.

== Season summary ==
=== Off-season ===
The Nuggets had the 13th overall pick in the 1994 NBA draft, and selected shooting guard Jalen Rose from the University of Michigan, and signed free agent Dale Ellis during the off-season. Prior to the regular season, LaPhonso Ellis suffered a knee injury from an off-season pickup game; second-year forward Rodney Rogers replaced Ellis as the team's starting power forward, while Mahmoud Abdul-Rauf was replaced with Robert Pack as the team's starting point guard.

=== Regular season ===
With the addition of Dale Ellis and Rose, and despite the loss of LaPhonso Ellis, the Nuggets won five of their first six games of the regular season. However, after an 18–16 start to the season, head coach Dan Issel resigned and was replaced with assistant coach Gene Littles as an interim coach. Under Littles, the Nuggets struggled losing 13 of their next 16 games; Littles was replaced with General Manager Bernie Bickerstaff as the team's new coach. The Nuggets were out of playoff position with a 20–26 record at the All-Star break.

Pack suffered a knee injury in February, as Abdul-Rauf returned to the starting lineup; Pack eventually returned during the final month of the season in April, but then re-injured his knee after only playing just 42 games. Under Bickerstaff, the Nuggets recovered playing above .500 in winning percentage by winning 20 of their final 32 games of the season; LaPhonso Ellis returned from his knee injury to play in the final six games. On the final day of the regular season on April 23, 1995, the Nuggets faced off against the Sacramento Kings at home at the McNichols Sports Arena, as both teams were fighting for the eighth seed in the Western Conference; the Nuggets defeated the Kings, 102–89 to qualify for the NBA playoffs, finishing in fourth place in the Midwest Division with a 41–41 record.

Dikembe Mutombo averaged 11.5 points, 12.5 rebounds and 3.9 blocks per game, and was named the NBA Defensive Player of the Year, and was also named to the NBA All-Defensive Second Team. In addition, Abdul-Rauf averaged 16.0 points and 3.6 assists per game, while Reggie Williams provided the team with 13.4 points and 1.5 steals per game, Rogers provided with 12.2 points and 4.8 rebounds per game, and Pack contributed 12.1 points, 6.9 assists and 1.5 steals per game. Meanwhile, Dale Ellis played a sixth man role off the bench, averaging 11.3 points per game and leading the Nuggets with 106 three-point field goals, Bryant Stith contributed 11.2 points per game, and Rose provided with 8.2 points and 4.8 assists per game, and was named to the NBA All-Rookie Second Team. Brian Williams averaged 7.9 points and 4.7 rebounds per game, while Tom Hammonds provided with 5.9 points and 3.2 rebounds per game, and LaPhonso Ellis contributed 4.0 points per game during his short six-game stint.

During the NBA All-Star weekend at the America West Arena in Phoenix, Arizona, Mutombo was selected for the 1995 NBA All-Star Game, as a member of the Western Conference All-Star team, while Rose was selected for the NBA Rookie Game, as a member of the Green team. Rogers finished tied in ninth place in Most Improved Player voting. The Nuggets finished tenth in the NBA in home-game attendance, with an attendance of 704,011 at the McNichols Sports Arena during the regular season.

=== NBA playoffs ===
In the Western Conference First Round of the 1995 NBA playoffs, the Nuggets faced off against the top–seeded, and Midwest Division champion San Antonio Spurs, who were led by the trio of All-Star center, and Most Valuable Player of the Year, David Robinson, Sean Elliott, and rebound-specialist Dennis Rodman. However, without LaPhonso Ellis and Pack due to season-ending injuries, the Nuggets were unable to repeat their previous playoff run, losing the first two games to the Spurs on the road at the Alamodome, before losing Game 3 at home, 99–95 at the McNichols Sports Arena, thus losing the series in a three-game sweep.

This would also be the Nuggets' final NBA playoff appearance until the 2003–04 season, as what would follow was an eight-year playoff drought.

=== Aftermath ===
Following the season, Rogers and Brian Williams were both traded to the Los Angeles Clippers, and Pack was traded to the Washington Bullets.

== Draft picks ==
Round	Pick	Player	Position	Nationality	School/Club team
1	13	Jalen Rose	SG/SF	United States	Michigan

== Roster ==
1994–95 Denver Nuggets roster
Players

Pos.	No.	Player	Height	Weight	DOB	From
G	1	Mahmoud Abdul-Rauf	6 ft 1 in (1.85 m)	162 lb (73 kg)	1969–03–09	LSU
F	3	Dale Ellis	6 ft 7 in (2.01 m)	205 lb (93 kg)	1960–08–06	Tennessee
F	20	LaPhonso Ellis	6 ft 8 in (2.03 m)	240 lb (109 kg)	1970–05–05	Notre Dame
G	9	Greg Grant	5 ft 7 in (1.70 m)	140 lb (64 kg)	1966–08–29	TCNJ
F	21	Tom Hammonds	6 ft 9 in (2.06 m)	215 lb (98 kg)	1967–03–27	Georgia Tech
F	53	Cliff Levingston	6 ft 8 in (2.03 m)	210 lb (95 kg)	1961–01–04	Wichita State
C	55	Dikembe Mutombo	7 ft 2 in (2.18 m)	245 lb (111 kg)	1966–06–25	Georgetown
G	14	Robert Pack	6 ft 2 in (1.88 m)	180 lb (82 kg)	1969–02–03	USC
F	42	Mark Randall	6 ft 8 in (2.03 m)	235 lb (107 kg)	1967–09–30	Kansas
F	54	Rodney Rogers	6 ft 7 in (2.01 m)	235 lb (107 kg)	1971–05–20	Wake Forest
G	5	Jalen Rose	6 ft 8 in (2.03 m)	210 lb (95 kg)	1973–01–30	Michigan
F	35	Reggie Slater	6 ft 7 in (2.01 m)	215 lb (98 kg)	1970–08–27	Wyoming
G	23	Bryant Stith	6 ft 5 in (1.96 m)	208 lb (94 kg)	1970–12–10	Virginia
C	8	Brian Williams	6 ft 11 in (2.11 m)	260 lb (118 kg)	1969–04–06	Arizona
F	34	Reggie Williams	6 ft 7 in (2.01 m)	190 lb (86 kg)	1964–03–05	Georgetown

Coaches
Head coach
- Dan Issel (fired)
- Gene Littles (interim)
- Bernie Bickerstaff
Assistant(s)
- Tom Nissalke

Legend
- (DP) Unsigned draft pick
- (FA) Free agent
- (S) Suspended
- Injured

Roster
Updated: April 5, 1995

== Regular season ==
=== Season standings ===
Midwest Division	W	L	PCT	GB	Home	Road	Div
z-San Antonio Spurs	62	20	.756	—	33–8	29–12	20–6
x-Utah Jazz	60	22	.732	2	33–8	27–14	17–9
x-Houston Rockets	47	35	.573	15	25–16	22–19	13–13
x-Denver Nuggets	41	41	.500	21	23–18	18–23	13–13
Dallas Mavericks	36	46	.439	26	19–22	17–24	11–15
Minnesota Timberwolves	21	61	.256	41	13–28	8–33	4–22

#	Western Conference				
#	Team	W	L	PCT	GB
1	z-San Antonio Spurs	62	20	.756	–
2	y-Phoenix Suns	59	23	.720	3
3	x-Utah Jazz	60	22	.732	2
4	x-Seattle SuperSonics	57	25	.695	5
5	x-Los Angeles Lakers	48	34	.585	14
6	x-Houston Rockets	47	35	.573	15
7	x-Portland Trail Blazers	44	38	.537	18
8	x-Denver Nuggets	41	41	.500	21
9	Sacramento Kings	39	43	.476	23
10	Dallas Mavericks	36	46	.439	26
11	Golden State Warriors	26	56	.317	36
12	Minnesota Timberwolves	21	61	.256	41
13	Los Angeles Clippers	17	65	.207	45

== Game log ==
=== Regular season ===
1994–95 game log
Total: 41–31 (home: 23–18; road: 18–23)
November: 6–6 (home: 4–4; road: 2–2)

Game	Date	Team	Score	High points	High rebounds	High assists	Location Attendance	Record
8	November 19, 1994; 7:00 p.m. MST	Houston	L 101–109	Williams (26)	Williams (9)	Abdul-Rauf (5)	McNichols Sports Arena; 17,171	5–3
12	November 29, 1994; 6:30 p.m. MST	@ Houston	L 81–96	Rogers (16)	Mutombo (10)	Pack, Rogers (4)	The Summit; 14,295	6–6

December: 8–7 (home: 5–2; road: 3–5)

Game	Date	Team	Score	High points	High rebounds	High assists	Location Attendance	Record

January: 5–10 (home: 4–3; road: 1–7)

Game	Date	Team	Score	High points	High rebounds	High assists	Location Attendance	Record
34	January 14, 1995; 7:00 p.m. MST	Houston	W 118–104	Abdul-Rauf (36)	Williams (10)	Williams (11)	McNichols Sports Arena; 17,171	18–16
42	January 31, 1995; 6:30 p.m. MST	@ Houston	L 74–86	Rogers (23)	Mutombo (13)	Rogers (5)	The Summit; 14,761	19–23

February: 5–8 (home: 3–4; road: 2–4)

Game	Date	Team	Score	High points	High rebounds	High assists	Location Attendance	Record
All-Star Break

March: 10–5 (home: 4–1; road: 6–4)

Game	Date	Team	Score	High points	High rebounds	High assists	Location Attendance	Record

April: 7–5 (home: 3–4; road: 4–1)

Game	Date	Team	Score	High points	High rebounds	High assists	Location Attendance	Record
74	April 9, 1995; 1:30 p.m. MDT	Houston	L 120–123	Abdul-Rauf (34)	Mutombo (14)	Abdul-Rauf (7)	McNichols Sports Arena; 17,171	35–39

1994–95 schedule

== Playoffs ==
1995 playoff game log
First round: 0–3 (home: 0–1; road: 0–2)

Game	Date	Team	Score	High points	High rebounds	High assists	Location Attendance	Series
1	April 28	@ San Antonio	L 88–104	Bryant Stith (16)	Bison Dele (12)	three players tied (3)	Alamodome; 25,235	0–1
2	April 30	@ San Antonio	L 96–122	Mahmoud Abdul-Rauf (21)	Dale Ellis (10)	Jalen Rose (10)	Alamodome	0–2
3	May 2	San Antonio	L 95–99	Rogers, Stith (18)	Rodney Rogers (9)	Jalen Rose (7)	McNichols Sports Arena; 17,171	0–3

1995 schedule

== Player statistics ==
Legend
GP	Games played	GS	Games started	MPG	Minutes per game
FG%	Field-goal percentage	3P%	3-point field-goal percentage	FT%	Free-throw percentage
RPG	Rebounds per game	APG	Assists per game	SPG	Steals per game
BPG	Blocks per game	PPG	Points per game

=== Regular season ===
Player	GP	GS	MPG	FG%	3FG%	FT%	RPG	APG	SPG	BPG	PPG
Mahmoud Abdul-Rauf	73	43	28.5	.470	.386	.885	1.9	3.6	1.1	0.1	16.0
Reggie Williams	74	70	29.7	.459	.320	.759	4.4	3.1	1.5	0.9	13.4
Rodney Rogers	80	77	26.8	.488	.338	.651	4.8	2.0	1.2	0.6	12.2
Robert Pack	42	32	27.2	.430	.417	.783	2.7	6.9	1.5	0.1	12.1
Dikembe Mutombo	82	82	37.8	.556		.654	12.5	1.4	0.5	3.9	11.5
Dale Ellis	81	3	24.6	.453	.403	.866	2.7	0.7	0.5	0.1	11.3
Bryant Stith	81	51	28.8	.472	.294	.824	3.3	1.9	1.1	0.2	11.2
Jalen Rose	81	37	22.2	.454	.316	.739	2.7	4.8	0.8	0.3	8.2
Bison Dele	63	10	20.0	.589		.654	4.7	0.8	0.6	0.7	7.9
Tom Hammonds	70	5	13.7	.535	.000	.746	3.2	0.5	0.2	0.2	5.9
Reggie Slater	25	0	9.4	.494		.727	2.3	0.5	0.3	0.1	4.8
LaPhonso Ellis	6	0	9.7	.360		1.000	2.8	0.7	0.2	0.8	4.0
Cliff Levingston	57	0	8.2	.423	.000	.422	2.2	0.5	0.2	0.4	2.3
Greg Grant	14	0	10.8	.303	.286	.750	0.6	3.1	0.4	0.1	2.2
Eldridge Recasner	3	0	4.3	.167	.000	1.000	0.7	0.3	1.0	0.0	2.0
Darnell Mee	2	0	4.0	.200	.333		0.5	1.0	0.5	0.0	1.5
Mark Randall	8	0	4.9	.300	.000		1.5	0.1	0.0	0.0	0.8

=== Playoffs ===
Player	GP	GS	MPG	FG%	3FG%	FT%	RPG	APG	SPG	BPG	PPG
Bryant Stith	3	1	28.3	.531	.167	.789	3.0	2.3	0.3	0.3	16.7
Mahmoud Abdul-Rauf	3	2	25.3	.364	.167	1.000	1.7	1.7	0.7	0.0	13.3
Dale Ellis	3	0	24.3	.357	.308	.923	4.7	1.0	0.7	0.3	12.0
Jalen Rose	3	3	33.0	.464	.250	.600	3.7	6.0	1.0	0.7	10.0
Reggie Williams	3	3	28.0	.222	.308	1.000	5.3	4.0	1.0	0.3	8.7
Rodney Rogers	3	3	25.3	.545	.250	.250	4.0	1.7	1.0	1.3	8.7
Bison Dele	3	0	14.7	.556		1.000	6.0	0.7	0.0	0.3	8.0
Tom Hammonds	3	0	14.7	.643		.333	2.3	0.3	0.0	0.7	6.7
Dikembe Mutombo	3	3	28.0	.600		.667	6.3	0.3	0.0	2.3	6.0
Cliff Levingston	3	0	11.7	.500		.500	3.0	0.3	1.0	0.7	2.3
Greg Grant	3	0	6.7	.000	.000	1.000	1.0	1.7	0.3	0.0	0.7

Player statistics citation:

== Awards, records, and honors ==
- Dikembe Mutombo, NBA Defensive Player of the Year Award
- Dikembe Mutombo, NBA All-Defensive Second Team
- Jalen Rose, NBA All-Rookie Team 2nd Team

== Transactions ==
=== Free agents ===
==== Additions ====
Player	Signed	Date	Former team
Reggie Slater	Free agent	August 2, 1994	Girona (Spain)
Cliff Levingston	Free agent	September 29, 1994	Buckler Bologna (Italy)
Dale Ellis	Free agent	October 4, 1994	San Antonio Spurs
Mark Randall	Signed two 10-day contracts	February 23, 1995	Fort Wayne Fury (CBA)
Eldridge Recasner	10-day contract	March 14, 1995	Yakima Sun Kings (CBA)
Greg Grant	Signed two 10-day contracts	March 14, 1995	Mexico City Aztecas (CBA)
Mark Randall	Signed for rest of season	March 17, 1995	Denver Nuggets
Greg Grant	Signed for rest of season	April 5, 1995	Denver Nuggets

==== Subtractions ====
Player	Reason left	Date	New team
Alvin Robertson	Waived	October 3, 1994	Toronto Raptors
Mark Randall	Waived	November 1, 1994	Fort Wayne Fury (CBA)
Darnell Mee	Waived	February 1, 1995	Tri-City Chinook (CBA)

=== Trades ===
The Denver Nuggets did not make any trades in the off-season and the regular season.

Player Transactions Citation:
