= 1994–95 Portland Trail Blazers season =

NBA professional basketball team season

- Head coach: P. J. Carlesimo
- General manager: Bob Whitsitt
- Arena: Memorial Coliseum

Results
- Record: 44–38 (.537)
- Place: Division: 4th (Pacific); Conference: 7th (Western)
- Playoff finish: First round (lost to Suns 0–3)
- Stats at Basketball Reference

Local media
- Television: KGW; Prime Sports Northwest
- Radio: KEX

The 1994–95 Portland Trail Blazers season was the 25th season for the Portland Trail Blazers in the National Basketball Association. The Trail Blazers' 25th season was marked by change, as this was the team's final season in which they played their home games at the Memorial Coliseum.

== Season summary ==
=== Off-season ===
The Trail Blazers had the 17th overall pick in the 1994 NBA draft, and selected shooting guard Aaron McKie out of Temple University. During the off-season, the team hired P.J. Carlesimo as their new head coach.

=== Regular season ===
Early into the regular season, the Trail Blazers traveled overseas to Yokohama, Japan to play two games against the Los Angeles Clippers at the Yokohama Arena. In the first game on November 4, 1994, the Trail Blazers were the road team and defeated the Clippers by a score of 121–100, in front of 14,229 fans in attendance; Clyde Drexler led the team with 26 points, while Clifford Robinson finished with 22 points, and Rod Strickland contributed 17 points and 7 assists. In the second game on November 5, the Trail Blazers were the home team and defeated the Clippers by a score of 112–95, in front of 14,239 fans in attendance; Drexler led the team with 41 points, and made all four of his three-point field-goal attempts, while Strickland posted a double-double of 23 points and 14 assists.

Under Carlesimo, and with Terry Porter only playing just 35 games due to an ankle injury, the Trail Blazers got off to a 6–6 start to the regular season in November, and later on held a 25–20 record at the All-Star break. At mid-season, the team honored Drexler's request to be traded to a contender, sending him along with three-point specialist Tracy Murray to the defending NBA champion Houston Rockets in exchange for Otis Thorpe; before the trade, Drexler averaged 22.0 points, 5.7 rebounds, 5.1 assists and 1.8 steals per game in 41 games, but was not selected for the 1995 NBA All-Star Game in Phoenix, Arizona. The Rockets would go on to win their second consecutive NBA championship, defeating the Orlando Magic in a four-game sweep in the 1995 NBA Finals; it was Drexler's first ever championship. With the addition of Thorpe, the Trail Blazers finished in fourth place in the Pacific Division with a 44–38 record, and earned the seventh seed in the Western Conference; the team qualified for the NBA playoffs for the 13th consecutive year.

Robinson averaged 21.3 points and 5.6 rebounds per game, and led the Trail Blazers with 142 three-point field goals, while Strickland averaged 18.9 points, 5.0 rebounds, 8.8 assists and 1.9 steals per game, and Thorpe played a sixth man role off the bench, averaging 13.5 points and 6.9 rebounds per game in 34 games after the trade. In addition, Buck Williams provided the team with 9.2 points and 8.2 rebounds per game, while Chris Dudley contributed 5.5 points, 9.3 rebounds and 1.5 blocks per game. Off the bench, Harvey Grant provided with 9.1 points and 3.8 rebounds per game, while Porter contributed 8.9 points and 3.8 assists per game, second-year guard James Robinson contributed 9.2 points and 2.5 assists per game, Jerome Kersey averaged 8.1 points and 4.1 rebounds per game, and McKie contributed 6.5 points per game.

The Trail Blazers finished 24th in the NBA in home-game attendance, with an attendance of 529,759 at the Memorial Coliseum during the regular season, which was the fourth-lowest in the league.

=== NBA playoffs ===
In the Western Conference First Round of the 1995 NBA playoffs, the Trail Blazers faced off against the 2nd–seeded, and Pacific Division champion Phoenix Suns, who were led by the All-Star trio of Charles Barkley, Kevin Johnson, and three-point specialist Dan Majerle. The Trail Blazers lost the first two games to the Suns on the road at the America West Arena, before losing Game 3 at home, 117–109 at the Memorial Coliseum, thus losing the series in a three-game sweep.

=== Aftermath ===
Following the season, Thorpe was traded to the Detroit Pistons, while Porter signed as a free agent with the Minnesota Timberwolves, Kersey was left unprotected in the 1995 NBA expansion draft, where he was selected by the Toronto Raptors expansion team, and Mark Bryant signed with the Houston Rockets.

== Draft picks ==
Round	Pick	Player	Position	Nationality	School/Club team
1	17	Aaron McKie	SG	United States	Temple
2	43	Shawnelle Scott	C	United States	St. John's

== Roster ==
1994–95 Portland Trail Blazers roster
Players

Pos.	No.	Player	Height	Weight	DOB	From
C	2	Mark Bryant	6 ft 9 in (2.06 m)	245 lb (111 kg)	1965–04–25	Seton Hall
C	24	Chris Dudley	6 ft 11 in (2.11 m)	235 lb (107 kg)	1965–02–22	Yale
C	53	James Edwards	7 ft 0 in (2.13 m)	225 lb (102 kg)	1955–11–22	Washington
F	44	Harvey Grant	6 ft 8 in (2.03 m)	195 lb (88 kg)	1965–07–04	Oklahoma
G	12	Steve Henson (injured)	5 ft 11 in (1.80 m)	177 lb (80 kg)	1968–02–02	Kansas State
F	25	Jerome Kersey	6 ft 7 in (2.01 m)	215 lb (98 kg)	1962–06–26	Longwood
G	23	Aaron McKie	6 ft 5 in (1.96 m)	209 lb (95 kg)	1972–10–02	Temple
G	30	Terry Porter	6 ft 3 in (1.91 m)	195 lb (88 kg)	1963–04–08	UW–Stevens Point
F	3	Clifford Robinson	6 ft 10 in (2.08 m)	225 lb (102 kg)	1966–12–16	Connecticut
G	26	James Robinson	6 ft 2 in (1.88 m)	180 lb (82 kg)	1970–08–31	Alabama
G	1	Rod Strickland	6 ft 3 in (1.91 m)	175 lb (79 kg)	1966–07–11	DePaul
F	33	Otis Thorpe	6 ft 9 in (2.06 m)	225 lb (102 kg)	1962–08–05	Providence
F	52	Buck Williams	6 ft 8 in (2.03 m)	215 lb (98 kg)	1960–03–08	Maryland

Coaches
Head coach
- P. J. Carlesimo
Assistant(s)
- Rick Carlisle
- Johnny Davis
- Dick Harter

Legend
- (DP) Unsigned draft pick
- (FA) Free agent
- (S) Suspended
- Injured

Roster

== Regular season ==
=== Season standings ===
Pacific Division	W	L	PCT	GB	Home	Road	Div
y-Phoenix Suns	59	23	.720	—	32–9	27–14	23–7
x-Seattle SuperSonics	57	25	.695	2	32–9	25–16	16–14
x-Los Angeles Lakers	48	34	.585	11	29–12	19–22	15–15
x-Portland Trail Blazers	44	38	.537	15	26–15	18–23	17–13
Sacramento Kings	39	43	.476	20	27–14	12–29	17–13
Golden State Warriors	26	56	.317	33	15–26	11–30	11–19
Los Angeles Clippers	17	65	.207	42	13–28	4–37	6–24

#	Western Conference				
#	Team	W	L	PCT	GB
1	z-San Antonio Spurs	62	20	.756	–
2	y-Phoenix Suns	59	23	.720	3
3	x-Utah Jazz	60	22	.732	2
4	x-Seattle SuperSonics	57	25	.695	5
5	x-Los Angeles Lakers	48	34	.585	14
6	x-Houston Rockets	47	35	.573	15
7	x-Portland Trail Blazers	44	38	.537	18
8	x-Denver Nuggets	41	41	.500	21
9	Sacramento Kings	39	43	.476	23
10	Dallas Mavericks	36	46	.439	26
11	Golden State Warriors	26	56	.317	36
12	Minnesota Timberwolves	21	61	.256	41
13	Los Angeles Clippers	17	65	.207	45

z – clinched division title
y – clinched division title
x – clinched playoff spot

=== Game log ===
1994–95 game log
Total: 44–38 (home: 26–15; road: 18–23)
November: 6–6 (home: 3–3; road: 3–3)

Game	Date	Team	Score	High points	High rebounds	High assists	Location Attendance	Record
8	November 22, 1994; 5:30 p.m. PST	@ Houston	W 102–94	Drexler (30)	Robinson (13)	Robinson (9)	The Summit; 16,611	5–3

December: 7–7 (home: 7–3; road: 0–4)

Game	Date	Team	Score	High points	High rebounds	High assists	Location Attendance	Record

January: 9–6 (home: 3–2; road: 6–4)

Game	Date	Team	Score	High points	High rebounds	High assists	Location Attendance	Record

February: 8–4 (home: 6–1; road: 2–3)

Game	Date	Team	Score	High points	High rebounds	High assists	Location Attendance	Record
44	February 6, 1995; 7:00 p.m. PST	Houston	W 120–82	Robinson (20)	Kersey (14)	Drexler (7)	Memorial Coliseum; 12,888	24–20
All-Star Break

March: 7–10 (home: 3–4; road: 4–6)

Game	Date	Team	Score	High points	High rebounds	High assists	Location Attendance	Record

April: 7–5 (home: 4–2; road: 3–3)

Game	Date	Team	Score	High points	High rebounds	High assists	Location Attendance	Record
73	April 7, 1995; 7:00 p.m. PDT	Houston	W 127–109	Strickland (27)	Robinson (8)	Strickland (10)	Memorial Coliseum; 12,888	39–34
76	April 13, 1995; 5:30 p.m. PDT	@ Houston	L 99–112	Strickland (22)	Thorpe (14)	Strickland (5)	The Summit; 16,611	40–36

1994–95 schedule

== Playoffs ==
1995 playoff game log
First round: 0–3 (home: 0–1; road: 0–2)

Game	Date	Team	Score	High points	High rebounds	High assists	Location Attendance	Series
1	April 28	@ Phoenix	L 102–129	Rod Strickland (23)	Grant, Dudley (7)	Rod Strickland (13)	America West Arena; 19,023	0–1
2	April 30	@ Phoenix	L 94–103	Rod Strickland (26)	Buck Williams (7)	Rod Strickland (12)	America West Arena; 19,023	0–2
3	May 2	Phoenix	L 109–117	Rod Strickland (21)	Clifford Robinson (10)	Rod Strickland (12)	Memorial Coliseum; 12,888	0–3

1995 schedule

== Player statistics ==
Legend
GP	Games played	GS	Games started	MPG	Minutes per game
FG%	Field-goal percentage	3P%	3-point field-goal percentage	FT%	Free-throw percentage
RPG	Rebounds per game	APG	Assists per game	SPG	Steals per game
BPG	Blocks per game	PPG	Points per game

=== Season ===
Player	GP	GS	MPG	FG%	3P%	FT%	RPG	APG	SPG	BPG	PPG
Mark Bryant	49	0	13.4	.526	.500	.651	3.3	.6	.4	.3	5.0
Clyde Drexler	41	41	34.8	.428	.363	.835	5.7	5.1	1.8	.5	22.0
Chris Dudley	82	82	27.4	.406	.000	.464	9.3	.4	.5	1.5	5.5
James Edwards	28	0	9.5	.386	.000	.647	1.5	.3	.2	.3	2.7
Harvey Grant	75	14	23.6	.461	.308	.705	3.8	1.1	.7	.7	9.1
Steve Henson	37	0	10.3	.430	.442	.880	.7	2.3	.2	.0	3.2
Jerome Kersey	63	0	18.1	.415	.259	.766	4.1	1.3	.8	.6	8.1
Aaron McKie	45	20	18.4	.444	.393	.685	2.9	2.0	.8	.4	6.5
Tracy Murray	29	3	10.8	.412	.390	.824	1.3	.5	.2	.0	5.9
Terry Porter	35	9	22.0	.393	.386	.707	2.3	3.8	.9	.1	8.9
Clifford Robinson	75	73	36.3	.452	.371	.694	5.6	2.6	1.1	1.1	21.3
James Robinson	71	25	21.7	.409	.341	.591	1.9	2.5	.7	.2	9.2
Rod Strickland	64	61	35.4	.466	.374	.745	5.0	8.8	1.9	.1	18.9
Otis Thorpe	34	0	26.7	.568	.000	.649	6.9	1.6	.6	.4	13.5
Buck Williams	82	82	29.5	.512	.500	.673	8.2	1.0	.8	.8	9.2

=== Playoffs ===
Player	GP	GS	MPG	FG%	3P%	FT%	RPG	APG	SPG	BPG	PPG
Mark Bryant	2	0	3.0	.500	.000	.000	1.0	.0	.0	.0	1.0
Chris Dudley	3	3	19.7	.667	.000	.375	5.0	.3	.0	.3	2.3
James Edwards	1	0	4.0	.000	.000	.000	.0	.0	.0	.0	.0
Harvey Grant	3	3	38.3	.500	.556	.625	5.3	2.0	1.0	.7	14.3
Jerome Kersey	3	0	21.0	.571	.000	.667	2.7	1.0	1.0	.3	12.7
Aaron McKie	3	0	11.3	.571	.500	.000	.7	.3	1.0	.0	5.7
Terry Porter	3	0	7.0	.538	.400	.600	.7	1.3	.0	.0	6.3
Clifford Robinson	3	3	39.7	.362	.235	563	6.3	2.7	.7	.3	15.7
James Robinson	2	0	2.0	.667	.667	.000	.0	.5	.0	.0	3.0
Rod Strickland	3	3	42.0	.415	.400	.778	4.0	12.3	1.0	.7	23.3
Otis Thorpe	3	0	22.0	.571	.000	.700	4.3	.7	.0	.0	10.3
Buck Williams	3	3	34.3	.600	.000	.636	6.3	.3	1.3	.7	8.3

Player statistics citation:

== Awards and records ==
The Trail Blazers did not win any awards for the 1994–95 season.

== Transactions ==
=== Trades ===
February 14, 1995	To Portland Trail Blazers Otis Thorpe; Cash considerations 1995 first-round pick	To Houston Rockets Clyde Drexler; Tracy Murray

=== Free agents ===
Additions
Player	Date signed	Former team
James Edwards	September 19	Los Angeles Lakers
Elmer Bennett	October 4	Fargo-Moorhead Fever (CBA)
Negele Knight	October 27	San Antonio Spurs
Jerome Kersey	October 18	Portland Trail Blazers
Steve Henson	November 20	Mexico Aztecas (CBA)

Subtractions
Player	Date signed	New Team
Elmer Bennett	October 28	Oklahoma City Cavalry (CBA)
Shawnelle Scott	October 28	Oklahoma City Cavalry (CBA)
Jaren Jackson	November 1	Philadelphia 76ers
Negele Knight	December 18	Detroit Pistons

Player Transactions Citation:
