= Tim Breaux =

American basketball player (born 1970)

Personal information
- Born: September 19, 1970 (age 56) Baton Rouge, Louisiana, U.S.
- Listed height: 6 ft 7 in (2.01 m)
- Listed weight: 215 lb (98 kg)

Career information
- High school: Zachary (Zachary, Louisiana)
- College: Wyoming (1988–1992)
- NBA draft: 1992: undrafted
- Playing career: 1992–2004
- Position: Small forward
- Number: 15, 22

Career history
- 1992–1993: Sioux Falls Skyforce
- 1993: Tours Joué
- 1993–1994: Pamesa Valencia
- 1994–1996: Houston Rockets
- 1996–1997: Sioux Falls Skyforce
- 1997: Rockford Lightning
- 1997: Milwaukee Bucks
- 1997–1998: Idaho Stampede
- 1998: Cáceres
- 1998–1999: Galatasaray
- 1999–2000: Dierre Massa e Cozzile
- 2000: Brandt Hagen
- 2003–2004: Yakima Sun Kings

Career highlights
- NBA champion (1995); CBA All-Rookie Second Team (1993)
- Stats at NBA.com
- Stats at Basketball Reference

Timothy Breaux (born September 19, 1970) is an American former professional basketball player.

Born in Baton Rouge, Louisiana, Breaux attended the University of Wyoming and joined the Continental Basketball Association's Sioux Falls Skyforce and also played in Europe, including stints in Spain and France. He signed with the NBA's Houston Rockets in 1994 as an undrafted player. He was traded along with Pete Chilcutt to the Vancouver Grizzlies in 1996 in exchange for some draft picks. He also played briefly with the Milwaukee Bucks.

He last played in 2004 for the CBA's Yakima Sun Kings.

== NBA career statistics ==
Legend
GP	Games played	GS	Games started	MPG	Minutes per game
FG%	Field goal percentage	3P%	3-point field goal percentage	FT%	Free throw percentage
RPG	Rebounds per game	APG	Assists per game	SPG	Steals per game
BPG	Blocks per game	PPG	Points per game	**Bold**	Career high

=== Regular season ===
Year	Team	GP	GS	MPG	FG%	3P%	FT%	RPG	APG	SPG	BPG	PPG
1994–95	Houston	42	2	8.1	**.372**	.240	**.653**	0.8	**0.4**	**0.3**	0.1	**3.0**
1995–96	Houston	**54**	**4**	**10.6**	.366	.326	.622	**1.1**	**0.4**	0.2	0.1	**3.0**
1997–98	Milwaukee	6	0	5.0	.364	**.333**	.500	0.3	0.3	**0.3**	**0.2**	1.7
Career		102	6	9.2	.369	.297	.635	0.9	0.4	0.2	0.1	2.9
