= 1994–95 Minnesota Timberwolves season =

NBA professional basketball team season

- Head coach: Bill Blair
- Owners: Glen Taylor
- Arena: Target Center

Results
- Record: 21–61 (.256)
- Place: Division: 6th (Midwest); Conference: 12th (Western)
- Playoff finish: Did not qualify
- Stats at Basketball Reference

Local media
- Television: KARE; KLGT-TV; Prime Sports Upper Midwest
- Radio: KFAN

The 1994–95 Minnesota Timberwolves season was the sixth season for the Minnesota Timberwolves in the National Basketball Association.

== Season summary ==
=== Off-season ===
The Timberwolves received the fourth overall pick in the 1994 NBA draft, and selected small forward Donyell Marshall from the University of Connecticut. During the off-season, the team acquired Sean Rooks from the Dallas Mavericks, and signed free agents Winston Garland, and undrafted rookie point guard Darrick Martin in February. The team also hired Bill Blair as their new head coach.

=== Regular season ===
Under Blair and with the addition of Marshall, Rooks and Garland, the Timberwolves continued to struggle losing 13 of their first 14 games of the regular season, including a seven-game losing streak, as Micheal Williams suffered a season-ending left heel injury after only just one game. In December, the team signed free agent Greg Foster, who was previously released by the Chicago Bulls. At mid-season, Marshall was traded to the Golden State Warriors in exchange for Tom Gugliotta. The Timberwolves held an 11–36 record at the All-Star break, lost nine of their final ten games of the season, and finished in last place in the Midwest Division with a 21–61 record, setting a dubious record in becoming the first team ever to lose 60 or more games in four consecutive seasons. The team missed the NBA playoffs for the sixth consecutive year.

Second-year star Isaiah Rider led the Timberwolves with 20.4 points per game and 139 three-point field goals, while Christian Laettner averaged 16.3 points and 7.6 rebounds per game, and Gugliotta provided the team with 14.4 points, 7.2 rebounds, 4.5 assists and 2.0 steals per game in 31 games after the trade. In addition, Doug West contributed 12.9 points per game, while Rooks provided with 10.9 points and 6.1 rebounds per game, and Martin contributed 7.5 points and 3.9 assists per game in 34 games. Meanwhile, Garland provided with 6.1 points and 4.4 assists per game, as the team's starting point guard in Williams' absence, Stacey King averaged 5.3 points and 3.3 rebounds per game, Chris Smith contributed 5.0 points per game, and Foster provided with 4.6 points and 3.4 rebounds per game.

During the NBA All-Star weekend at the America West Arena in Phoenix, Arizona, Rider participated in the NBA Slam Dunk Contest for the second consecutive year, while before the mid-season trade, Marshall was selected for the NBA Rookie Game, as a member of the White team. The Timberwolves finished 21st in the NBA in home-game attendance, with an attendance of 603,518 at the Target Center during the regular season.

=== Aftermath ===
Following the season, Martin signed as a free agent with the Vancouver Grizzlies expansion team, while Foster signed with the Utah Jazz, and Garland, King, Smith and Mike Brown were all released to free agency.

== Draft picks ==
| Round | Pick | Player | Position | Nationality | College |
|---|---|---|---|---|---|
| 1 | 4 | Donyell Marshall | SF/PF | United States | Connecticut |
| 2 | 30 | Howard Eisley | PG | United States | Boston College |

== Roster ==
1994–95 Minnesota Timberwolves roster
Players

| Pos. | No. | Player | Height | Weight | DOB | From |
|---|---|---|---|---|---|---|
| C | 40 | Mike Brown | 6 ft 9 in (2.06 m) | 257 lb (117 kg) | –– | George Washington |
| F | 30 | Pat Durham | 6 ft 7 in (2.01 m) | 210 lb (95 kg) | –– | Colorado State |
| C | 44 | Greg Foster | 6 ft 11 in (2.11 m) | 240 lb (109 kg) | –– | UTEP |
| G | 22 | Winston Garland | 6 ft 2 in (1.88 m) | 170 lb (77 kg) | –– | Missouri State |
| F | 24 | Tom Gugliotta | 6 ft 10 in (2.08 m) | 240 lb (109 kg) | –– | NC State |
| F | 51 | Andrés Guibert | 6 ft 10 in (2.08 m) | 225 lb (102 kg) | –– | Cuba |
| F/C | 21 | Stacey King | 6 ft 11 in (2.11 m) | 230 lb (104 kg) | –– | Oklahoma |
| F | 32 | Christian Laettner | 6 ft 11 in (2.11 m) | 235 lb (107 kg) | –– | Duke |
| G | 15 | Darrick Martin | 5 ft 11 in (1.80 m) | 170 lb (77 kg) | –– | UCLA |
| G | 34 | Isaiah Rider | 6 ft 5 in (1.96 m) | 215 lb (98 kg) | –– | UNLV |
| C | 45 | Sean Rooks | 6 ft 10 in (2.08 m) | 250 lb (113 kg) | –– | Arizona |
| G | 3 | Chris Smith | 6 ft 3 in (1.91 m) | 190 lb (86 kg) | | Connecticut |
| F | 5 | Doug West | 6 ft 6 in (1.98 m) | 200 lb (91 kg) | –– | Villanova |
| G | 4 | Micheal Williams | 6 ft 2 in (1.88 m) | 175 lb (79 kg) | –– | Baylor |

Coaches
Head coach
- Bill Blair
Assistant(s)
- Greg Ballard
- Mike Schuler
- Randy Wittman

Legend
- (DP) Unsigned draft pick
- (FA) Free agent
- (S) Suspended
- Injured

Roster

== Regular season ==
=== Season standings ===
| Midwest Division | W | L | PCT | GB | Home | Road | Div |
|---|---|---|---|---|---|---|---|
| z-San Antonio Spurs | 62 | 20 | .756 | — | 33–8 | 29–12 | 20–6 |
| x-Utah Jazz | 60 | 22 | .732 | 2 | 33–8 | 27–14 | 17–9 |
| x-Houston Rockets | 47 | 35 | .573 | 15 | 25–16 | 22–19 | 13–13 |
| x-Denver Nuggets | 41 | 41 | .500 | 21 | 23–18 | 18–23 | 13–13 |
| Dallas Mavericks | 36 | 46 | .439 | 26 | 19–22 | 17–24 | 11–15 |
| Minnesota Timberwolves | 21 | 61 | .256 | 41 | 13–28 | 8–33 | 4–22 |

| # | Western Conference | | | | |
| # | Team | W | L | PCT | GB |
|---|---|---|---|---|---|
| 1 | z-San Antonio Spurs | 62 | 20 | .756 | – |
| 2 | y-Phoenix Suns | 59 | 23 | .720 | 3 |
| 3 | x-Utah Jazz | 60 | 22 | .732 | 2 |
| 4 | x-Seattle SuperSonics | 57 | 25 | .695 | 5 |
| 5 | x-Los Angeles Lakers | 48 | 34 | .585 | 14 |
| 6 | x-Houston Rockets | 47 | 35 | .573 | 15 |
| 7 | x-Portland Trail Blazers | 44 | 38 | .537 | 18 |
| 8 | x-Denver Nuggets | 41 | 41 | .500 | 21 |
| 9 | Sacramento Kings | 39 | 43 | .476 | 23 |
| 10 | Dallas Mavericks | 36 | 46 | .439 | 26 |
| 11 | Golden State Warriors | 26 | 56 | .317 | 36 |
| 12 | Minnesota Timberwolves | 21 | 61 | .256 | 41 |
| 13 | Los Angeles Clippers | 17 | 65 | .207 | 45 |

z - clinched division title
y - clinched division title
x - clinched playoff spot

== Game log ==
=== Regular season ===
1994–95 game log
Total: 21–61 (Home: 13–28; Road: 8–33)
November: 1–13 (home: 0–7; road: 1–6)

| Game | Date | Team | Score | High points | High rebounds | High assists | Location Attendance | Record |
|---|---|---|---|---|---|---|---|---|
| 2 | November 5, 1994; 7:00 p.m. CST | Houston | L 85–115 | Rider (18) | Marshall (7) | Smith (4) | Target Center; 16,578 | 0–2 |

December: 5–7 (home: 2–4; road: 3–3)

| Game | Date | Team | Score | High points | High rebounds | High assists | Location Attendance | Record |

January: 4–12 (home: 3–4; road: 1–8)

| Game | Date | Team | Score | High points | High rebounds | High assists | Location Attendance | Record |
|---|---|---|---|---|---|---|---|---|
| 35 | January 16, 1995; 7:00 p.m. CST | Houston | W 94–75 | Rider (24) | West (11) | Garland, West (6) | Target Center; 12,442 | 8–27 |
| 41 | January 28, 1995; 7:30 p.m. CST | @ Houston | L 93–114 | Eisley, Laettner (14) | Laettner (8) | Eisley, Rider (4) | The Summit; 16,611 | 10–31 |

February: 4–9 (home: 3–4; road: 1–5)

| Game | Date | Team | Score | High points | High rebounds | High assists | Location Attendance | Record |
|---|---|---|---|---|---|---|---|---|
All-Star Break

March: 5–11 (home: 4–5; road: 1–6)

| Game | Date | Team | Score | High points | High rebounds | High assists | Location Attendance | Record |
|---|---|---|---|---|---|---|---|---|
| 57 | March 3, 1995; 7:00 p.m. CST | Houston | W 108–105 | Gugliotta (21) | Laettner (8) | Gugliotta, Laettner (6) | Target Center; 17,068 | 16–41 |
| 64 | March 16, 1995; 7:30 p.m. CST | @ Houston | L 97–104 | Rooks (21) | Laettner (8) | Gugliotta, West (5) | The Summit; 10,711 | 17–47 |

April: 2–9 (home: 1–4; road: 1–5)

| Game | Date | Team | Score | High points | High rebounds | High assists | Location Attendance | Record |

1994–95 schedule

== Player statistics ==
=== Regular season ===
| Player | POS | GP | GS | MP | REB | AST | STL | BLK | PTS | MPG | RPG | APG | SPG | BPG | PPG |
|---|---|---|---|---|---|---|---|---|---|---|---|---|---|---|---|
| Christian Laettner | C | 81 | 80 | 2,770 | 613 | 234 | 101 | 87 | 1,322 | 34.2 | 7.6 | 2.9 | 1.2 | 1.1 | 16.3 |
| Sean Rooks | C | 80 | 70 | 2,405 | 486 | 97 | 29 | 71 | 868 | 30.1 | 6.1 | 1.2 | .4 | .9 | 10.9 |
| Isaiah Rider | SG | 75 | 67 | 2,645 | 249 | 245 | 69 | 23 | 1,532 | 35.3 | 3.3 | 3.3 | .9 | .3 | 20.4 |
| Winston Garland | PG | 73 | 58 | 1,931 | 168 | 318 | 71 | 13 | 448 | 26.5 | 2.3 | 4.4 | 1.0 | .2 | 6.1 |
| Doug West | SG | 71 | 65 | 2,328 | 227 | 185 | 65 | 24 | 919 | 32.8 | 3.2 | 2.6 | .9 | .3 | 12.9 |
| Chris Smith | SG | 64 | 17 | 1,073 | 73 | 146 | 32 | 22 | 320 | 16.8 | 1.1 | 2.3 | .5 | .3 | 5.0 |
| Greg Foster^{†} | PF | 61 | 0 | 845 | 205 | 23 | 13 | 20 | 281 | 13.9 | 3.4 | .4 | .2 | .3 | 4.6 |
| Pat Durham | SF | 59 | 2 | 852 | 94 | 53 | 36 | 32 | 302 | 14.4 | 1.6 | .9 | .6 | .5 | 5.1 |
| Stacey King | PF | 50 | 10 | 792 | 165 | 26 | 24 | 20 | 266 | 15.8 | 3.3 | .5 | .5 | .4 | 5.3 |
| Donyell Marshall^{†} | SF | 40 | 8 | 1,036 | 196 | 57 | 25 | 50 | 431 | 25.9 | 4.9 | 1.4 | .6 | 1.3 | 10.8 |
| Darrick Martin | PG | 34 | 9 | 803 | 64 | 133 | 34 | 0 | 254 | 23.6 | 1.9 | 3.9 | 1.0 | .0 | 7.5 |
| Howard Eisley^{†} | PG | 34 | 4 | 496 | 42 | 77 | 18 | 5 | 113 | 14.6 | 1.2 | 2.3 | .5 | .1 | 3.3 |
| Tom Gugliotta^{†} | SF | 31 | 17 | 1,018 | 222 | 139 | 61 | 28 | 445 | 32.8 | 7.2 | 4.5 | 2.0 | .9 | 14.4 |
| Mike Brown | C | 27 | 0 | 213 | 45 | 10 | 7 | 0 | 35 | 7.9 | 1.7 | .4 | .3 | .0 | 1.3 |
| Charles Shackleford | PF | 21 | 2 | 239 | 67 | 8 | 8 | 6 | 94 | 11.4 | 3.2 | .4 | .4 | .3 | 4.5 |
| Andrés Guibert | PF | 17 | 0 | 167 | 45 | 10 | 8 | 1 | 45 | 9.8 | 2.6 | .6 | .5 | .1 | 2.6 |
| Askia Jones | SG | 11 | 0 | 139 | 11 | 16 | 6 | 0 | 45 | 12.6 | 1.0 | 1.5 | .5 | .0 | 4.1 |
| Micheal Williams | PG | 1 | 1 | 28 | 1 | 3 | 2 | 0 | 6 | 28.0 | 1.0 | 3.0 | 2.0 | .0 | 6.0 |

- ^{†} Denotes player spent time with another team in the season. Stats reflect time with the Timberwolves only.

== See also ==
- 1994-95 NBA season
