= Jamie Watson (basketball) =

American basketball player (born 1972)

Personal information
- Born: February 23, 1972 (age 54) Elm City, North Carolina, U.S.
- Listed height: 6 ft 7 in (2.01 m)
- Listed weight: 190 lb (86 kg)

Career information
- High school: Ralph L. Fike (Wilson, North Carolina)
- College: South Carolina (1990–1994)
- NBA draft: 1994: 2nd round, 47th overall pick
- Drafted by: Utah Jazz
- Playing career: 1994–2006
- Position: Small forward
- Number: 15, 3

Career history
- 1994–1997: Utah Jazz
- 1997: Dallas Mavericks
- 1997: Fontanafreda Siena
- 1999: Miami Heat
- 2000–2001: Antranik
- 2001–2002: Benfica
- 2002–2003: Omonia
- 2003–2004: Arrieros de Medellin
- 2004–2005: Liceo Mixto Los Andes
- 2005–2006: Al-Riyadh SC

Career highlights
- Second-team All-SEC (1994); Fourth-team Parade All-American (1990)
- Stats at NBA.com
- Stats at Basketball Reference

Jamie Lovell Watson (born February 23, 1972) is an American former professional basketball player who played in the National Basketball Association (NBA) and other leagues.

Watson, a 6' 7" 190 lb small forward, was selected 47th overall (second round) by the Utah Jazz in the 1994 NBA draft. Between 1994 and 1997 he played with the Jazz and briefly for the Dallas Mavericks, as well as three games for the Miami Heat in 1999.

He finished in third place during the NBA Slam Dunk Contest in 1995.
