= Pete Chilcutt =

American basketball player (born 1968)

Personal information
- Born: September 14, 1968 (age 58) Sumter, South Carolina, U.S.
- Listed height: 6 ft 10 in (2.08 m)
- Listed weight: 230 lb (104 kg)

Career information
- High school: Tuscaloosa Academy (Tuscaloosa, Alabama)
- College: North Carolina (1987–1991)
- NBA draft: 1991: 1st round, 27th overall pick
- Drafted by: Sacramento Kings
- Playing career: 1991–2000
- Position: Power forward
- Number: 32, 34, 33, 23, 24

Career history
- 1991–1994: Sacramento Kings
- 1994: Detroit Pistons
- 1994: Illy Caffè Trieste
- 1994–1996: Houston Rockets
- 1996–1999: Vancouver Grizzlies
- 1999–2000: Utah Jazz
- 2000: Los Angeles Clippers
- 2000: Cleveland Cavaliers
- 2000: Los Angeles Clippers

Career highlights
- NBA champion (1995); Third-team All-ACC (1991); McDonald's All-American (1986); Fourth-team Parade All-American (1986)

Career NBA statistics
- Points: 2,494 (4.3 ppg)
- Rebounds: 1,935 (3.3 rpg)
- Assists: 488 (0.8 apg)
- Stats at NBA.com
- Stats at Basketball Reference

Peter Shawn Chilcutt (born September 14, 1968) is an American former professional basketball player who played in the National Basketball Association (NBA), winning an NBA championship in 1995 with the Houston Rockets. He played college basketball for the North Carolina Tar Heels.

== Biography ==
Born in Sumter, South Carolina, Chilcutt attended Tuscaloosa Academy in Tuscaloosa, Alabama. He was recruited by a number of schools, and decided to go to the University of North Carolina at Chapel Hill. Following a college basketball career at North Carolina, he was selected in the first round of the 1991 NBA draft by the Sacramento Kings.

Chilcutt played forward for seven teams over a nine-year professional career that spanned from the 1991–92 to the 1999–2000 season. He won an NBA Championship in the 1994–95 season with the Houston Rockets, for whom he played from 1994 to 1996. He also played for the Detroit Pistons, Vancouver Grizzlies, Los Angeles Clippers, Cleveland Cavaliers, and Utah Jazz.

== NBA career statistics ==
Legend
GP	Games played	GS	Games started	MPG	Minutes per game
FG%	Field goal percentage	3P%	3-point field goal percentage	FT%	Free throw percentage
RPG	Rebounds per game	APG	Assists per game	SPG	Steals per game
BPG	Blocks per game	PPG	Points per game	**Bold**	Career high
*	Led the league

=== Regular season ===
Year	Team	GP	GS	MPG	FG%	3P%	FT%	RPG	APG	SPG	BPG	PPG
1991–92	Sacramento	69	2	11.8	.452	**1.000**	.821	2.7	.6	.5	.2	3.6
1992–93	Sacramento	59	9	14.1	.485	–	.696	3.3	1.1	.4	.4	6.1
1993–94	Sacramento	46	**24**	**21.2**	.463	.000	.596	**5.9**	**1.5**	**.9**	**.6**	**7.3**
1993–94	Detroit	30	0	13.0	.425	.214	.769	3.3	.5	.3	.4	3.8
1994–95†	Houston	68	17	19.8	.445	.407	.738	4.7	1.0	.4	**.6**	5.3
1995–96	Houston	74	0	8.8	.408	.378	.654	2.1	.4	.3	.2	2.7
1996–97	Vancouver	54	1	12.3	.436	.362	.591	2.9	.9	.5	.3	3.4
1997–98	Vancouver	**82***	0	17.3	.435	.415	.661	3.7	1.3	.6	.5	4.9
1998–99	Vancouver	46	0	15.2	.366	.382	.824	2.5	.7	.5	.3	3.6
1999–00	Utah	26	0	8.6	.355	.100	**1.000**	1.7	.4	.2	.2	1.8
1999–00	Cleveland	6	0	5.0	.000	–	–	1.5	.2	.0	.0	.0
1999–00	L.A. Clippers	24	2	14.5	**.492**	.313	**1.000**	3.3	.7	.4	.3	3.0
Career		584	55	14.4	.441	.381	.696	3.3	.8	.5	.4	4.3

=== Playoffs ===
Year	Team	GP	GS	MPG	FG%	3P%	FT%	RPG	APG	SPG	BPG	PPG
1995†	Houston	**20**	**15**	**16.2**	**.484**	**.389**	**.824**	2.9	**.9**	**.4**	**.2**	**4.5**
1996	Houston	1	0	10.0	.250	.000	.000	**3.0**	.0	.0	.0	2.0
Career		21	15	15.9	.471	.378	.737	2.9	.9	.3	.2	4.4

== Post-basketball career ==
After his basketball career, Chilcutt spent time as a sixth-grade math and science teacher at Folsom Middle School in Folsom, California. Pete also founded a basketball academy in the Greater Sacramento area called Clutch City Basketball Academy.
