= 1995 NBA All-Star Game =

Exhibition basketball game

| | 1 | 2 | 3 | 4 | Total |
|---|---|---|---|---|---|
| East | 28 | 28 | 25 | 31 | 112 |
| West | 31 | 41 | 32 | 35 | 139 |
- Date: February 12, 1995
- Arena: America West Arena
- City: Phoenix
- MVP: Mitch Richmond
- National anthem: Boys Choir of Harlem
- Attendance: 18,755
- Network: NBC; TNT (All-Star Saturday)
- Announcers: Marv Albert, Matt Guokas and Steve Jones; Bob Neal, Doug Collins and Hubie Brown (All-Star Saturday)
| West | East |

NBA All-Star Game
| < 1994 | 1996 > |

The 1995 NBA All-Star Game was an exhibition basketball game played on February 12, 1995, at the America West Arena in Phoenix, Arizona, home of the Phoenix Suns. It was the 45th edition of the National Basketball Association (NBA) All-Star Game, held during the 1994–95 NBA season. This was also the second time that Phoenix has hosted the All-Star Game; the city had previously hosted the event in 1975 at the Arizona Veterans Memorial Coliseum, the Suns' previous home arena.

The Western All-Stars won the game 139–112 over the Eastern All-Stars. Mitch Richmond of the Sacramento Kings was voted MVP of the game.

The 1995 NBA All-Star Game was broadcast by NBC the fifth consecutive year.

== Background information ==
Charles Barkley was the main host of the event. During a break in the game near the fourth quarter he even wanted to shoot himself out of a catapult, but his coach made sure he didn't do it because he did not want his star player to get injured.

Grant Hill of the Detroit Pistons was the first rookie in NBA history to lead the league in votes for this year's All-Star game. Hakeem Olajuwon led the Western Conference voting. Karl Malone and David Robinson were both questionable for the game due to injuries but they ended up playing limited minutes. Dominique Wilkins and Clyde Drexler were not selected.

Larry Johnson came back to the All-Star lineup after missing last year's game due to a serious back injury. It meant a lot for him to come back from the injury and make the All-Star Game the next season. He came back as a reserve this year. Penny Hardaway played his first game as a starter for the Eastern conference team this year. Cedric Ceballos was selected as a reserve, but did not play due to being injured beforehand by Dikembe Mutombo in a regular season game. Mutombo replaced Ceballos.

Michael Jordan missed the game as he was still in the midst of his first retirement from basketball.

Brian Hill, head coach of the Eastern Conference leader Orlando Magic, coached the Eastern All-Stars. Paul Westphal, head coach of the Western Conference leader and game host Phoenix Suns, coached the Western All-Stars.

== Roster ==
Eastern Conference All-Stars
| Pos | Player | Team | No. of selections | Votes |
Starters
| G | Penny Hardaway | Orlando Magic | 1st | 999,327 |
| G | Reggie Miller | Indiana Pacers | 2nd | 908,493 |
| F | Scottie Pippen | Chicago Bulls | 5th | 1,134,525 |
| F | Grant Hill | Detroit Pistons | 1st | 1,289,585 |
| C | Shaquille O'Neal | Orlando Magic | 3rd | 1,263,451 |
Reserves
| F | Vin Baker | Milwaukee Bucks | 1st | — |
| G | Dana Barros | Philadelphia 76ers | 1st | — |
| G | Joe Dumars | Detroit Pistons | 5th | 826,935 |
| C | Patrick Ewing | New York Knicks | 9th | 728,331 |
| F | Tyrone Hill | Cleveland Cavaliers | 1st | — |
| F | Larry Johnson | Charlotte Hornets | 2nd | 698,931 |
| C | Alonzo Mourning | Charlotte Hornets | 2nd | 664,927 |
Head coach: Brian Hill (Orlando Magic)

Western Conference All-Stars
| Pos | Player | Team | No. of selections | Votes |
Starters
| G | Latrell Sprewell | Golden State Warriors | 2nd | 861,223 |
| G | Dan Majerle | Phoenix Suns | 3rd | 868,115 |
| F | Charles Barkley | Phoenix Suns | 9th | 1,046,105 |
| F | Shawn Kemp | Seattle SuperSonics | 3rd | 1,027,451 |
| C | Hakeem Olajuwon | Houston Rockets | 10th | 1,125,032 |
Reserves
| F | Cedric Ceballos^{INJ} | Los Angeles Lakers | 1st | 259,464 |
| F | Karl Malone | Utah Jazz | 8th | 526,741 |
| C | Dikembe Mutombo^{REP} | Denver Nuggets | 2nd | 594,789 |
| G | Gary Payton | Seattle SuperSonics | 2nd | 567,324 |
| G | Mitch Richmond | Sacramento Kings | 3rd | — |
| C | David Robinson | San Antonio Spurs | 6th | 1,046,364 |
| F | Detlef Schrempf | Seattle SuperSonics | 2nd | 391,451 |
| G | John Stockton | Utah Jazz | 7th | 798,219 |
Head coach: Paul Westphal (Phoenix Suns)

^INJ Cedric Ceballos did not participate due to injury.
^REP Dikembe Mutombo replaced Cedric Ceballos.

== Box score ==
=== Eastern Conference ===
| Player | Min | Fg | 3pt | Ft | Reb | Ast | Pts |
|---|---|---|---|---|---|---|---|
| Grant Hill, DET | 20 | 5-8 | 0-0 | 0-0 | 0 | 3 | 10 |
| Scottie Pippen, CHI | 30 | 5-15 | 2-6 | 0-0 | 7 | 3 | 12 |
| Shaquille O'Neal, ORL | 26 | 9-16 | 0-1 | 4-7 | 7 | 1 | 22 |
| Penny Hardaway, ORL | 31 | 4-9 | 0-2 | 4-6 | 5 | 11 | 12 |
| Reggie Miller, IND | 23 | 3-9 | 3-6 | 0-0 | 0 | 2 | 9 |
| Joe Dumars, DET | 21 | 5-8 | 1-2 | 0-0 | 0 | 6 | 11 |
| Patrick Ewing, NYK | 22 | 4-7 | 0-0 | 2-2 | 3 | 1 | 10 |
| Dana Barros, PHI | 11 | 2-5 | 1-3 | 0-0 | 1 | 3 | 5 |
| Larry Johnson, CHA | 20 | 2-3 | 1-1 | 2-2 | 4 | 2 | 7 |
| Alonzo Mourning, CHA | 19 | 4-9 | 0-1 | 2-3 | 8 | 1 | 10 |
| Vin Baker, MIL | 11 | 0-2 | 0-0 | 2-4 | 2 | 0 | 2 |
| Tyrone Hill, CLE | 6 | 1-1 | 0-0 | 0-0 | 4 | 0 | 2 |
| Total | 240 | 44-92 | 8-22 | 16-24 | 41 | 33 | 112 |

=== Western Conference ===
| Player | Min | Fg | 3pt | Ft | Reb | Ast | Pts |
|---|---|---|---|---|---|---|---|
| Charles Barkley, PHO | 23 | 7-12 | 1-4 | 0-0 | 9 | 2 | 15 |
| Shawn Kemp, SEA | 23 | 4-6 | 0-0 | 5-6 | 2 | 2 | 13 |
| Hakeem Olajuwon, HOU | 25 | 6-13 | 1-1 | 0-2 | 11 | 1 | 13 |
| Dan Majerle, PHO | 20 | 4-12 | 2-7 | 0-0 | 5 | 3 | 10 |
| Latrell Sprewell, GSW | 22 | 4-9 | 0-2 | 1-1 | 4 | 4 | 9 |
| Gary Payton, SEA | 23 | 3-10 | 0-3 | 0-0 | 5 | 15 | 6 |
| Mitch Richmond, SAC | 22 | 10-13 | 3-3 | 0-0 | 4 | 2 | 23 |
| David Robinson, SAS | 14 | 3-5 | 0-0 | 4-6 | 3 | 2 | 10 |
| Detlef Schrempf, SEA | 18 | 4-11 | 1-4 | 0-0 | 4 | 5 | 9 |
| Dikembe Mutombo, DEN | 20 | 6-8 | 0-0 | 0-0 | 8 | 1 | 12 |
| Karl Malone, UTA | 16 | 6-6 | 0-0 | 3-4 | 3 | 1 | 15 |
| John Stockton, UTA | 14 | 2-6 | 0-3 | 0-0 | 1 | 6 | 4 |
| Total | 240 | 59-111 | 8-27 | 13-19 | 59 | 44 | 139 |

== Match data ==
| Score by period | 1 | 2 | 3 | 4 | Total |
|---|---|---|---|---|---|
| East | 28 | 28 | 25 | 31 | 112 |
| West | 31 | 41 | 32 | 35 | 139 |
