= Elliot Perry =

American basketball player (born 1969)

Personal information
- Born: March 28, 1969 (age 57) Memphis, Tennessee, U.S.
- Listed height: 6 ft 0 in (1.83 m)
- Listed weight: 150 lb (68 kg)

Career information
- High school: Treadwell (Memphis, Tennessee)
- College: Memphis (1987–1991)
- NBA draft: 1991: 2nd round, 37th overall pick
- Drafted by: Los Angeles Clippers
- Playing career: 1991–2002
- Position: Point guard
- Number: 34, 21, 2, 5, 1

Career history
- 1991: Los Angeles Clippers
- 1991–1992: Charlotte Hornets
- 1992: La Crosse Catbirds
- 1992–1993: Rochester Renegade
- 1993–1994: Grand Rapids Hoops
- 1994–1996: Phoenix Suns
- 1996–1999: Milwaukee Bucks
- 1999–2000: New Jersey Nets
- 2000: Orlando Magic
- 2000–2001: Phoenix Suns
- 2002: Memphis Grizzlies

Career highlights
- 2× First-team All-Metro Conference (1989, 1991); No. 34 retired by Memphis Tigers; McDonald's All-American (1987)

Career NBA statistics
- Points: 3,449 (6.3 ppg)
- Assists: 1,699 (3.1 apg)
- Steals: 574 (1.0 spg)
- Stats at NBA.com
- Stats at Basketball Reference
Medals
Men's basketball
Representing United States
FIBA Americas Championship
Silver medal – second place	1989 Mexico City	Team competition

Elliot Lamonte Perry (born March 28, 1969) is an American former professional basketball player.

The 6-foot-0-inch (1.83 m) point guard from Memphis State University (now the University of Memphis), was selected with the tenth pick of the second round (37th overall) by the Los Angeles Clippers in the 1991 NBA draft. He played ten games in 1991-92 for the Clippers before being waived and subsequently signed for the rest of the season by the Charlotte Hornets. He then moved on to Continental Basketball Association (CBA) for two years before returning to the NBA with the Phoenix Suns where in 1994-95 he was voted runner-up for the NBA Most Improved Player Award.

He rounded out his NBA career in 2002 with his hometown Memphis Grizzlies for whom he played just two games after signing a 10-day contract. He scored 11 points in the 2 games.

Perry is also known as "Socks" because of the high long socks he wore during his college and NBA career. A quick and slashing player in college, his ability to alter his shot in mid-air to draw a foul from his defender made him very dangerous to defend. Lack of quality supporting players forced Perry to carry the U of M team on his skill. During his senior year Penny Hardaway had been scheduled to be his teammate, but Hardaway's academic qualifying woes ensured he was red-shirted, and these two never were able to team up.

== After basketball ==
Perry and fellow former NBA player and Memphis State alumn Hank McDowell became the radio broadcast team's color commentators for the Memphis Grizzlies starting in the 2006-07 NBA season. Today, Perry lives in Germantown, Tennessee, a suburb of Memphis. He and his wife have a child together. He still loves to play basketball with former players and kids in his neighborhood, and is active as a mentor with the Boys and Girls Club of Greater Memphis. He is a member of Kappa Alpha Psi fraternity.

He is a minority share owner of the Memphis Grizzlies.

== Career statistics ==
Legend
GP	Games played	GS	Games started	MPG	Minutes per game
FG%	Field goal percentage	3P%	3-point field goal percentage	FT%	Free throw percentage
RPG	Rebounds per game	APG	Assists per game	SPG	Steals per game
BPG	Blocks per game	PPG	Points per game	**Bold**	Career high
*	Led the league

=== NBA ===
==== Regular season ====
Year	Team	GP	GS	MPG	FG%	3P%	FT%	RPG	APG	SPG	BPG	PPG
1991–92	Los Angeles	10	0	6.6	.400	.000	.500	0.7	1.4	0.9	**0.1**	1.3
1991–92	Charlotte	40	0	9.3	.377	.200	.667	0.8	1.6	0.6	**0.1**	2.8
1993–94	Phoenix	27	9	16.0	.372	.000	.750	1.4	4.6	0.9	0.0	3.9
1994–95	Phoenix	**82***	**51**	**24.1**	.520	.417	.810	1.8	**4.8**	**1.9**	0.0	**9.7**
1995–96	Phoenix	81	26	20.6	.475	.407	.778	1.7	4.4	1.1	**0.1**	8.6
1996–97	Milwaukee	**82**	3	19.5	.474	.358	.745	1.5	3.0	1.2	0.0	6.9
1997–98	Milwaukee	81	33	21.6	.430	.340	**.844**	1.3	2.8	1.1	0.0	7.3
1998–99	Milwaukee	5	0	9.4	**.529**	**1.000**	.500	1.6	2.4	0.8	0.0	4.0
1998–99	New Jersey	30	0	8.1	.349	.391	.750	0.9	1.2	0.5	0.0	2.6
1999–00	New Jersey	60	5	13.4	.435	.282	.806	1.0	2.3	0.7	0.0	5.3
2000–01	Orlando	6	0	6.5	.455	.000	.000	0.7	0.8	0.5	0.0	1.7
2000–01	Phoenix	43	6	10.7	.465	.250	.727	1.0	1.7	0.4	0.0	3.2
2001–02	Memphis	2	0	24.0	.500	.000	.500	**2.0**	3.5	1.5	0.0	5.5
Career		549	133	17.3	.459	.359	.783	1.4	3.1	1.0	0.0	6.3

==== Playoffs ====
Year	Team	GP	GS	MPG	FG%	3P%	FT%	RPG	APG	SPG	BPG	PPG
1993–94	Phoenix	4	0	3.3	.143	.000	.000	0.0	0.3	0.3	0.0	0.5
1994–95	Phoenix	**9**	0	11.8	.476	**.400**	.800	1.1	1.3	0.6	0.0	**6.9**
1995–96	Phoenix	4	0	**12.8**	.500	.000	.000	0.5	**3.0**	0.5	0.0	3.5
2000–01	Phoenix	2	0	8.5	**.600**	.000	**1.000**	**2.0**	2.0	**1.0**	0.0	6.5
Career		19	0	9.8	.466	.333	.778	0.8	1.5	0.5	0.0	4.8

=== College ===
Year	Team	GP	GS	MPG	FG%	3P%	FT%	RPG	APG	SPG	BPG	PPG
1987–88	Memphis	**32**	**32**	30.3	.417	**.390**	.806	3.5	4.1	2.2	**0.2**	13.1
1988–89	Memphis	**32**	**32**	31.8	.462	.316	**.821**	3.4	3.7	2.1	0.0	19.4
1989–90	Memphis	30	-	32.3	.418	.258	.753	**3.7**	**5.0**	**2.7**	**0.2**	16.8
1990–91	Memphis	**32**	-	**36.5**	**.464**	.360	.793	3.5	4.6	**2.7**	0.0	**20.8**
Career		126	64	32.7	.443	.345	.794	3.5	4.3	2.4	0.1	17.5
