= 1994–95 Seattle SuperSonics season =

NBA basketball team season

- Head coach: George Karl
- General manager: Wally Walker
- Arena: Tacoma Dome

Results
- Record: 57–25 (.695)
- Place: Division: 2nd (Pacific); Conference: 4th (Western)
- Playoff finish: First round (lost to Lakers 1–3)
- Stats at Basketball Reference

Local media
- Television: KSTW; Prime Sports Northwest
- Radio: KJR

The 1994–95 Seattle SuperSonics season was the 27th season for the Seattle SuperSonics in the National Basketball Association.

== Season summary ==
=== Off-season ===
The SuperSonics received the eleventh overall pick in the 1994 NBA draft from the Charlotte Hornets via trade, and selected power forward Carlos Rogers out of Tennessee State University, but soon traded him to the Golden State Warriors in exchange for Šarūnas Marčiulionis and Byron Houston. During the off-season, the team signed free agent Bill Cartwright, who won three NBA championships with the Chicago Bulls in the early 1990s. For the duration of the regular season, the SuperSonics switched venues and played their home games at the Tacoma Dome in Tacoma, Washington, while their original stadium, the Seattle Center Coliseum, was being rebuilt to keep pace with NBA standards.

=== Regular season ===
The SuperSonics struggled with a 3–4 start to the regular season, but then won 13 of their next 16 games, posted a 10-game winning streak in January, and later on held a 33–12 record at the All-Star break. However, the team dealt with a few troubles during the season, and Cartwright only played just 29 games due to a groin injury. The SuperSonics posted a seven-game winning streak between March and April, finished in second place in the Pacific Division with a 57–25 record, and earned the fourth seed in the Western Conference; the team qualified for the NBA playoffs for the fifth consecutive year.

Gary Payton averaged 20.6 points, 7.1 assists and 2.5 steals per game, while Shawn Kemp averaged 18.7 points, 10.9 rebounds and 1.5 blocks per game, and Detlef Schrempf provided the team with 19.2 points, 6.2 rebounds and 3.8 assists per game; Payton and Kemp were both named to the All-NBA Second Team, while Schrempf was named to the All-NBA Third Team, and Payton was named to the NBA All-Defensive First Team. In addition, Kendall Gill contributed 13.7 points and 1.6 steals per game, while Sam Perkins provided with 12.7 points and 4.9 rebounds per game, and led the SuperSonics with 136 three-point field goals. Off the bench, Vincent Askew contributed 9.9 points per game, while Marčiulionis contributed 9.3 points per game, defensive guard Nate McMillan averaged 5.2 points, 5.3 assists and 2.1 steals per game, and was named to the NBA All-Defensive Second Team, and second-year center Ervin Johnson provided with 3.1 points, 4.5 rebounds and 1.0 blocks per game, starting at center for half of the regular season.

During the NBA All-Star weekend at the America West Arena in Phoenix, Arizona, Payton, Kemp and Schrempf were all selected for the 1995 NBA All-Star Game, as members of the Western Conference All-Star team. Payton also finished in ninth place in Most Valuable Player voting, while McMillan finished in fourth place in Sixth Man of the Year voting, and both players finished tied in sixth place in Defensive Player of the Year voting.

The SuperSonics finished 18th in the NBA in home-game attendance, with an attendance of 633,604 at the Tacoma Dome during the regular season. During the regular season, Gill and head coach George Karl both feuded with each other in public, as Gill dealt with clinical depression.

=== NBA playoffs ===
In the Western Conference First Round of the 1995 NBA playoffs, the SuperSonics faced off against the 5th–seeded Los Angeles Lakers, who were led by the trio of All-Star forward Cedric Ceballos, second-year star Nick Van Exel, and Vlade Divac. The SuperSonics won Game 1 over the Lakers at home, 96–71 at the Tacoma Dome. However, after a shocking first-round exit against the 8th–seeded Denver Nuggets in last year's playoffs, the SuperSonics lost the next three games, which included a Game 4 loss to the Lakers on the road, 114–110 at the Great Western Forum, thus losing the series in four games.

=== Aftermath ===
Following the season, Gill was traded back to his former team, the Charlotte Hornets, while Marčiulionis and Houston were both traded to the Sacramento Kings, and Cartwright retired.

== Draft picks ==
Round	Pick	Player	Position	Nationality	College/team
1	11	Carlos Rogers	PF/C	United States	Tennessee State
2	37	Dontonio Wingfield	SF	United States	Cincinnati
2	54	Željko Rebrača	C	FR Yugoslavia	KK Partizan

== Roster ==
1994–95 Seattle SuperSonics roster
Players

Pos.	No.	Player	Height	Weight	DOB	From
F	17	Vincent Askew	6 ft 6 in (1.98 m)	210 lb (95 kg)	1966–02–28	Memphis
C	24	Bill Cartwright	7 ft 1 in (2.16 m)	245 lb (111 kg)	1957–07–30	San Francisco
G	13	Kendall Gill	6 ft 5 in (1.96 m)	195 lb (88 kg)	1968–05–25	Illinois
F	21	Byron Houston	6 ft 5 in (1.96 m)	250 lb (113 kg)	1969–11–22	Oklahoma State
C	50	Ervin Johnson	6 ft 11 in (2.11 m)	245 lb (111 kg)	1967–12–21	LSU New Orleans
F	40	Shawn Kemp	6 ft 10 in (2.08 m)	230 lb (104 kg)	1969–11–26	Trinity Valley CC
C	45	Rich King	7 ft 2 in (2.18 m)	260 lb (118 kg)	1969–04–04	Nebraska
G	30	Šarūnas Marčiulionis	6 ft 5 in (1.96 m)	200 lb (91 kg)	1964–06–13	Lithuania
G	10	Nate McMillan	6 ft 5 in (1.96 m)	195 lb (88 kg)	1964–08–03	NC State
G	20	Gary Payton	6 ft 4 in (1.93 m)	180 lb (82 kg)	1968–07–23	Oregon State
F/C	14	Sam Perkins	6 ft 9 in (2.06 m)	235 lb (107 kg)	1961–06–14	North Carolina
C	55	Steve Scheffler	6 ft 9 in (2.06 m)	250 lb (113 kg)	1967–09–03	Purdue
F	11	Detlef Schrempf	6 ft 10 in (2.08 m)	235 lb (107 kg)	1963–01–21	Washington
F	34	Dontonio Wingfield	6 ft 8 in (2.03 m)	256 lb (116 kg)	1974–06–23	Cincinnati

Coaches
Head coach
- George Karl
Assistant(s)
- Dwane Casey
- Tim Grgurich
- Bob Kloppenburg
- Terry Stotts

Legend
- (DP) Unsigned draft pick
- (FA) Free agent
- (S) Suspended
- Injured

Roster
Updated: November 1, 1994

== Regular season ==
=== Season standings ===
Pacific Division	W	L	PCT	GB	Home	Road	Div
y-Phoenix Suns	59	23	.720	—	32–9	27–14	23–7
x-Seattle SuperSonics	57	25	.695	2	32–9	25–16	16–14
x-Los Angeles Lakers	48	34	.585	11	29–12	19–22	15–15
x-Portland Trail Blazers	44	38	.537	15	26–15	18–23	17–13
Sacramento Kings	39	43	.476	20	27–14	12–29	17–13
Golden State Warriors	26	56	.317	33	15–26	11–30	11–19
Los Angeles Clippers	17	65	.207	42	13–28	4–37	6–24

#	Western Conference				
#	Team	W	L	PCT	GB
1	z-San Antonio Spurs	62	20	.756	–
2	y-Phoenix Suns	59	23	.720	3
3	x-Utah Jazz	60	22	.732	2
4	x-Seattle SuperSonics	57	25	.695	5
5	x-Los Angeles Lakers	48	34	.585	14
6	x-Houston Rockets	47	35	.573	15
7	x-Portland Trail Blazers	44	38	.537	18
8	x-Denver Nuggets	41	41	.500	21
9	Sacramento Kings	39	43	.476	23
10	Dallas Mavericks	36	46	.439	26
11	Golden State Warriors	26	56	.317	36
12	Minnesota Timberwolves	21	61	.256	41
13	Los Angeles Clippers	17	65	.207	45

z – clinched division title
y – clinched division title
x – clinched playoff spot

=== Game log ===
1994–95 game log
Total: 57–25 (home: 32–9; road: 25–16)
November: 9–5 (home: 6–1; road: 3–4)

Game	Date	Team	Score	High points	High rebounds	High assists	Location Attendance	Record
1	November 5	Utah	110–103	Detlef Schrempf (26)	Detlef Schrempf (12)	Schrempf & Nate McMillan (4)	Tacoma Dome; 16,324	1–0
2	November 9	Sacramento	100–108	Shawn Kemp (21)	Shawn Kemp (9)	Schrempf & McMillan (5)	Tacoma Dome; 16,352	1–1
3	November 11	Phoenix	129–123	Shawn Kemp (26)	Ervin Johnson (9)	McMillan & Gary Payton (6)	Tacoma Dome; 16,352	2–1
4	November 13	L.A. Clippers	115–90	Vincent Askew (20)	Shawn Kemp (11)	Nate McMillan (6)	Tacoma Dome; 16,352	3–1
5	November 15	@ New Jersey	106–112	Shawn Kemp (26)	Shawn Kemp (13)	Gary Payton (6)	Brendan Byrne Arena; 15,310	3–2
6	November 16	@ Boston	93–120	Detlef Schrempf (19)	Shawn Kemp (10)	Nate McMillan (7)	Boston Garden; 14,890	3–3
7	November 18	@ Indiana	87–94	Gary Payton (21)	Detlef Schrempf (11)	Gary Payton (4)	Market Square Arena; 16,627	3–4
8	November 19	@ Milwaukee	120–96	Gary Payton (25)	Shawn Kemp (11)	Gary Payton (7)	Bradley Center; 18,633	4–4
9	November 22	New Jersey	104–97	Gary Payton (26)	Shawn Kemp (17)	Gary Payton (9)	Tacoma Dome; 13,574	5–4
10	November 23	@ Utah	103–113	Šarūnas Marčiulionis (21)	Vincent Askew (6)	Gary Payton (8)	Delta Center; 19,911	5–5
11	November 25	@ San Antonio	114–94	Gary Payton (21)	Shawn Kemp (10)	Gary Payton (7)	Alamodome; 19,016	6–5
12	November 26, 1994; 5:30 p.m. PST	@ Houston	W 98–94	Kemp & Sam Perkins (22)	Kemp (12)	Payton (5)	The Summit; 16,611	7–5
13	November 28	Indiana	118–99	Gary Payton (28)	Ervin Johnson (14)	Gary Payton (7)	Tacoma Dome; 14,647	8–5
14	November 30	San Antonio	109–100	Gary Payton (21)	Detlef Schrempf (7)	Gary Payton (6)	Tacoma Dome; 14,793	9–5

December : 9–4 (home: 8–0; road: 1–4)

Game	Date	Team	Score	High points	High rebounds	High assists	Location Attendance	Record
15	December 3	Milwaukee	111–108	Shawn Kemp (26)	Shawn Kemp (15)	Payton & McMillan (9)	Tacoma Dome; 14,661	10–5
16	December 6, 1994; 5:00 p.m. PST	Houston	W 103–90	Payton (30)	Kemp (9)	Payton (8)	Tacoma Dome; 13,017	11–5
17	December 8	@ Sacramento	91–103	Vincent Askew (17)	Shawn Kemp (19)	Detlef Schrempf (8)	ARCO Arena; 17,317	11–6
18	December 10	@ L.A. Clippers	132–127 (2 OT)	Shawn Kemp (42)	Shawn Kemp (14)	Gary Payton (14)	Los Angeles Memorial Sports Arena; 9,048	12–6
19	December 14	@ Phoenix	93–111	Gary Payton (16)	Shawn Kemp (14)	Gary Payton (6)	America West Arena; 19,023	12–7
20	December 15	Portland	114–103	Shawn Kemp (26)	Shawn Kemp (8)	Gary Payton (9)	Tacoma Dome; 13,151	13–7
21	December 17	Orlando	124–84	Gary Payton (31)	Shawn Kemp (14)	Gary Payton (7)	Tacoma Dome; 16,832	14–7
22	December 20	L.A. Clippers	110–79	Shawn Kemp (23)	Shawn Kemp (13)	Gary Payton (9)	Tacoma Dome; 11,952	15–7
23	December 22	Dallas	103–101	Gary Payton (28)	Shawn Kemp (10)	Gary Payton (8)	Tacoma Dome; 14,763	16–7
24	December 25	@ Denver	96–105	Kendall Gill & Schrempf (21)	Detlef Schrempf (6)	Gary Payton (4)	McNichols Sports Arena; 17,171	16–8
25	December 26	Sacramento	123–103	Sam Perkins (26)	Shawn Kemp (9)	Detlef Schrempf (8)	Tacoma Dome; 15,780	17–8
26	December 28	Philadelphia	121–102	Kendall Gill (25)	Shawn Kemp (9)	Nate McMillan (10)	Tacoma Dome; 15,787	18–8
27	December 29	@ L.A. Lakers	95–96	Detlef Schrempf (26)	Shawn Kemp (13)	Gary Payton (11)	Great Western Forum; 17,505	18–9

January : 11–2 (home: 4–2; road: 7–0)

Game	Date	Team	Score	High points	High rebounds	High assists	Location Attendance	Record
28	January 3	@ Washington	121–107	Gary Payton (24)	Shawn Kemp (8)	Nate McMillan (9)	US Airways Arena; 16,940	19–9
29	January 4	@ Cleveland	116–85	Gary Payton (32)	Schrempf, Johnson & Kemp (6)	Gary Payton & Detlef Schrempf (6)	Gund Arena; 20,562	20–9
30	January 6	@ Chicago	108–101	Kemp & Schrempf (23)	Bill Cartwright & Kemp (9)	Gary Payton (13)	United Center; 22,248	21–9
31	January 10	@ Golden State	128–118 OT	Detlef Schrempf (33)	Detlef Schrempf (16)	McMillan & Payton (13)	Oakland–Alameda County Coliseum Arena; 15,025	22–9
32	January 13	L.A. Clippers	108–101	Detlef Schrempf (23)	Shawn Kemp (14)	Gary Payton (11)	Tacoma Dome; 13,836	23–9
33	January 15	Portland	131–124	Gary Payton (29)	Sam Perkins (10)	Gary Payton (9)	Tacoma Dome; 16,950	24–9
34	January 17	Cleveland	115–91	Detlef Schrempf (21)	Shawn Kemp (11)	Nate McMillan (7)	Tacoma Dome; 12,914	25–9
35	January 19	@ Minnesota	102–87	Detlef Schrempf (22)	Shawn Kemp (13)	Gary Payton (8)	Target Center; 13,396	26–9
36	January 21	@ Dallas	117–91	Gary Payton (22)	Detlef Schrempf (29)	Gary Payton (8)	Reunion Arena; 17,502	27–9
37	January 24	Denver	111–89	Shawn Kemp (19)	Schrempf (9)	Gary Payton (8)	Tacoma Dome; 16,352	28–9
38	January 26	Utah	108–120	Shawn Kemp (19)	Shawn Kemp (12)	Kemp, McMillan, Payton (5)	Tacoma Dome; 14,835	28–10
39	January 28	L.A. Lakers	121–128 (OT)	Detlef Schrempf (26)	Detlef Schrempf (10)	Gary Payton (13)	Tacoma Dome; 17,426	28–11
40	January 30	@ Philadelphia	109–104	Sam Perkins (31)	Shawn Kemp (8)	McMillan & Payton (9)	CoreStates Spectrum; 13,892	29–11

February : 8–5 (home: 4–3; road: 4–2)

Game	Date	Team	Score	High points	High rebounds	High assists	Location Attendance	Record
41	February 2	@ Orlando	106–103	Gary Payton (26)	Shawn Kemp (12)	Nate McMillan (8)	Orlando Arena; 16,010	30–11
42	February 3	@ Atlanta	121–98	Gary Payton (22)	Kendall Gill (8)	Gary Payton (9)	Omni Coliseum; 14,083	31–11
43	February 5	@ Miami	136–109	Shawn Kemp (26)	Shawn Kemp (11)	Nate McMillan (12)	Miami Arena; 14,852	32–11
44	February 7	San Antonio	103–106	Kendall Gill (24)	Detlef Schrempf (14)	Gary Payton (10)	Tacoma Dome; 15,083	32–12
45	February 9	Chicago	126–118 OT	Shawn Kemp (30)	Sam Perkins (10)	Payton & Schrempf (8)	Tacoma Dome; 16,079	33–12
All-Star Break
46	February 14	Golden State	118–108	Gary Payton (26)	Sam Perkins (12)	Nate McMillan (10)	Tacoma Dome; 13,918	34–12
47	February 15	@ L.A. Lakers	96–102	Gary Payton (24)	Shawn Kemp (12)	Kendall Gill (7)	Great Western Forum; 14,936	34–13
48	February 17	@ Portland	109–114	Shawn Kemp (30)	Shawn Kemp (7)	Gary Payton (10)	Veterans Memorial Coliseum; 12,888	34–14
49	February 18	@ Golden State	129–117	Detlef Schrempf (31)	Sam Perkins & Schrempf (9)	Gary Payton (7)	Oakland–Alameda County Coliseum Arena; 15,025	35–14
50	February 20	L.A. Lakers	105–108	Detlef Schrempf (26)	Shawn Kemp (14)	Gary Payton (9)	Tacoma Dome; 16,502	35–15
51	February 22	Minnesota	120–104	Kendall Gill (34)	Shawn Kemp (13)	Gary Payton (13)	Tacoma Dome; 13,012	36–15
52	February 24	Denver	90–86	Detlef Schrempf (22)	Detlef Schrempf (9)	Payton & Schrempf (8)	Tacoma Dome; 18,056	37–15
53	February 27	Charlotte	114–116	Gary Payton (32)	Shawn Kemp (8)	Detlef Schrempf (9)	Tacoma Dome; 16,379	37–16

March : 13–4 (home: 7–1; road: 6–3)

Game	Date	Team	Score	High points	High rebounds	High assists	Location Attendance	Record
54	March 2	@ L.A. Clippers	116–88	Kemp & Marčiulionis (21)	Kemp & Gill (7)	Gary Payton (7)	Arrowhead Pond; 17,873	38–16
55	March 3	@ Phoenix	118–122 (OT)	Detlef Schrempf (31)	Shawn Kemp (13)	McMillan, Payton, & Schrempf (8)	America West Arena; 19,023	38–17
56	March 6	Golden State	103–106	Detlef Schrempf (23)	Shawn Kemp (16)	Nate McMillan (8)	Tacoma Dome; 13,442	38–18
57	March 8	@ Minnesota	118–104	Detlef Schrempf (27)	Shawn Kemp (9)	Gary Payton (8)	Target Center; 14,339	39–18
58	March 9	@ Charlotte	99–112	Kendall Gill (23)	Kendall Gill (11)	Gill & Payton (5)	Charlotte Coliseum; 23,698	39–19
59	March 11	@ New York	96–84	Kemp & Schrempf (22)	Shawn Kemp (19)	Gary Payton (8)	Madison Square Garden; 19,763	40–19
60	March 12	@ Detroit	134–94	Shawn Kemp (25)	Shawn Kemp (16)	Nate McMillan (8)	The Palace at Auburn Hills; 16,235	41–19
61	March 14	Boston	113–93	Detlef Schrempf (23)	Shawn Kemp (11)	Nate McMillan (9)	Tacoma Dome; 16,296	42–19
62	March 16	Miami	103–78	Detlef Schrempf (20)	Shawn Kemp (16)	Gary Payton (7)	Tacoma Dome; 15,257	43–18
63	March 18	Detroit	133–110	Payton & Schrempf (25)	Shawn Kemp (11)	Nate McMillan (9)	Tacoma Dome; 17,326	44–19
64	March 20	@ San Antonio	96–104	Shawn Kemp (23)	Shawn Kemp (12)	Gary Payton (6)	Alamodome; 19,798	44–20
65	March 21, 1995; 5:30 p.m. PST	@ Houston	W 104–102	Marčiulionis (20)	Kemp (12)	McMillan & Payton (6)	The Summit; 16,611	45–20
66	March 23	Washington	108–103	Payton & Schrempf (24)	Shawn Kemp (13)	Gary Payton (9)	Tacoma Dome; 13,775	46–20
67	March 24	@ Portland	112–118	Gary Payton (32)	Shawn Kemp (13)	Payton & Schrempf (7)	Veterans Memorial Coliseum; 12,888	47–20
68	March 26	New York	93–82	Gary Payton (26)	Shawn Kemp (9)	Payton & Perkins (4)	Tacoma Dome; 18,056	48–20
69	March 29	Minnesota	109–92	Gary Payton (33)	Shawn Kemp (11)	Payton & Marčiulionis (6)	Tacoma Dome; 12,336	49–20
70	March 31	Sacramento	120–95	Gary Payton (27)	Shawn Kemp (12)	Šarūnas Marčiulionis (6)	Tacoma Dome; 14,698	50–20

April : 7–5 (home: 3–2; road: 4–3)

Game	Date	Team	Score	High points	High rebounds	High assists	Location Attendance	Record
71	April 2	Atlanta	105–83	Payton & Kemp (21)	Shawn Kemp (18)	McMillan & Payton (6)	Tacoma Dome; 17,368	51–20
72	April 4	@ Utah	92–114	Gary Payton (26)	Shawn Kemp (9)	Gary Payton (6)	Delta Center; 19,911	52–21
73	April 6	@ Denver	106–100	Detlef Schrempf (27)	Shawn Kemp (18)	Gary Payton & Schrempf (4)	McNichols Sports Arena; 17,171	52–21
74	April 8	@ Dallas	125–98	Detlef Schrempf (22)	Johnson & Kemp (12)	Gary Payton (8)	Reunion Arena; 17,502	53–21
75	April 11	Phoenix	90–96	Shawn Kemp (27)	Shawn Kemp (15)	Gary Payton (6)	Tacoma Dome; 18,036	53–22
76	April 13	Dallas	133–112	Gary Payton (24)	Shawn Kemp (19)	Nate McMillan (15)	Tacoma Dome; 15,900	54–22
77	April 15	@ Golden State	115–99	Gary Payton (24)	Shawn Kemp (13)	Gary Payton (10)	Oakland–Alameda County Coliseum Arena; 15,025	55–22
78	April 17	Portland	93–97	Detlef Schrempf (25)	Kemp & Johnson (7)	Gary Payton (6)	Tacoma Dome; 16,659	55–23
79	April 18	@ L.A. Lakers	113–97	Gary Payton (28)	Kemp & Johnson (14)	Nate McMillan (13)	Great Western Forum; 17,505	56–23
80	April 20, 1995; 7:00 p.m. PDT	Houston	W 111–101	Payton (25)	Kemp (13)	Payton (7)	Tacoma Dome; 18,056	57–23
81	April 21	@ Sacramento	97–105	Detlef Schrempf (26)	Shawn Kemp (7)	Detlef Schrempf (10)	ARCO Arena; 17,317	57–24
82	April 23	@ Phoenix	100–105	Detlef Schrempf (18)	Shawn Kemp (13)	Kemp & Payton (5)	America West Arena; 19,023	57–25

1994–95 schedule

== Playoffs ==
1995 playoff game log
First round: 1–3 (home: 1–1; road: 0–2)

Game	Date	Team	Score	High points	High rebounds	High assists	Location Attendance	Series
1	April 27	L.A. Lakers	W 96–71	Shawn Kemp (21)	Kemp, Perkins (7)	Nate McMillan (8)	Tacoma Dome; 14,073	1–0
2	April 29	L.A. Lakers	L 82–84	Shawn Kemp (22)	Shawn Kemp (12)	Gary Payton (6)	Tacoma Dome; 14,681	1–1
3	May 1	@ L.A. Lakers	L 101–105	Shawn Kemp (30)	Shawn Kemp (11)	Nate McMillan (10)	Great Western Forum; 17,505	1–2
4	May 4	@ L.A. Lakers	L 110–114	Gary Payton (27)	Shawn Kemp (18)	three players tied (6)	Great Western Forum; 17,505	1–3

1995 schedule

== Player statistics ==
Legend
GP	Games played	GS	Games started	MPG	Minutes per game
FG%	Field-goal percentage	3P%	3-point field-goal percentage	FT%	Free-throw percentage
RPG	Rebounds per game	APG	Assists per game	SPG	Steals per game
BPG	Blocks per game	PPG	Points per game

=== Season ===
Player	GP	GS	MPG	FG%	3P%	FT%	RPG	APG	SPG	BPG	PPG
Vincent Askew	71	1	24.2	.492	.330	.739	2.5	2.5	.7	.2	9.9
Bill Cartwright	29	19	14.8	.391	.000	.625	3.0	.3	.2	.1	2.4
Kendall Gill	73	58	29.1	.457	.368	.742	4.0	2.6	1.6	.4	13.7
Byron Houston	39	0	6.6	.458	.273	.737	1.4	.2	.3	.1	3.4
Ervin Johnson	64	30	14.2	.443	.000	.630	4.5	.3	.3	1.0	3.1
Shawn Kemp	82	79	32.7	.547	.286	.749	10.9	1.8	1.2	1.5	18.7
Rich King	2	0	3.0	.000	.000	.000	.0	.0	.0	.0	.0
Šarūnas Marčiulionis	66	4	18.1	.473	.402	.732	1.0	1.7	1.1	.0	9.3
Nate McMillan	80	18	25.9	.418	.342	.586	3.8	5.3	2.1	.7	5.2
Gary Payton	82	82	36.8	.509	.302	.716	3.4	7.1	2.5	.2	20.6
Sam Perkins	82	37	28.7	.466	.397	.799	4.9	1.6	.9	.5	12.7
Steve Scheffler	18	0	5.7	.522	.000	.833	1.3	.2	.1	.1	2.2
Detlef Schrempf	82	82	35.2	.523	.514	.839	6.2	3.8	1.1	.4	19.2
Dontonio Wingfield	20	0	4.1	.353	.167	.800	1.5	.2	.3	.2	2.3

=== Playoffs ===
Player	GP	GS	MPG	FG%	3P%	FT%	RPG	APG	SPG	BPG	PPG
Vincent Askew	4	0	23.3	.414	.800	.667	3.8	2.0	.8	.0	7.5
Kendall Gill	4	0	18.0	.360	.250	.625	1.0	2.5	1.0	.3	6.3
Byron Houston	1	0	1.0	.000	.000	.000	.0	.0	.0	.0	.0
Ervin Johnson	4	2	13.5	.286	.000	1.000	5.3	.0	.3	1.0	3.5
Shawn Kemp	4	4	40.0	.579	1.000	.821	12.0	2.8	2.0	1.8	24.8
Nate McMillan	4	4	28.3	.348	.125	1.000	4.5	7.3	2.5	.5	4.8
Gary Payton	4	4	43.0	.478	.200	.417	2.5	5.3	1.3	.0	17.8
Sam Perkins	4	2	35.3	.438	.455	1.000	7.8	3.3	.8	1.3	13.5
Steve Scheffler	1	0	1.0	1.000	.000	.000	1.0	.0	.0	.0	2.0
Detlef Schrempf	4	4	38.3	.404	.556	.792	4.8	3.0	.8	.5	18.8

Player statistics citation:

== Awards and records ==
=== Awards ===
All-NBA Teams

- Shawn Kemp – All-NBA Second Team
- Gary Payton – All-NBA Second Team
- Detlef Schrempf – All-NBA Third Team

NBA All-Defensive Teams

- Gary Payton – All-Defensive First Team
- Nate McMillan – All-Defensive Second Team

1995 NBA All-Star Game

- Shawn Kemp (third participation, second as a starter)
- Gary Payton (second participation)
- Detlef Schrempf (second participation)

== Transactions ==
=== Trades ===
July 18, 1994	To Seattle SuperSonics Byron Houston; Šarūnas Marčiulionis	To Golden State Warriors Ricky Pierce; Carlos Rogers; 1995 second-round pick 1995 second-round pick

=== Free agents ===
Additions
Player	Date signed	Former team
Bill Cartwright	September 9	Chicago Bulls
Carl Thomas	October 3	Grand Rapids Hoops (CBA)

Subtractions
Player	Date signed	New Team
Michael Cage	August 2	Cleveland Cavaliers
Carl Thomas	October 14	Grand Rapids Mackers (CBA)
Chris King	November 1	Aris (Greece)

Player Transactions Citation:

== See also ==
- 1994–95 NBA season
