= 1994–95 Phoenix Suns season =

NBA team season

- Division champions
- Head coach: Paul Westphal
- General manager: Jerry Colangelo
- Owner: Jerry Colangelo
- Arena: America West Arena

Results
- Record: 59–23 (.720)
- Place: Division: 1st (Pacific); Conference: 2nd (Western)
- Playoff finish: Conference semifinals (lost to Rockets 3–4)
- Stats at Basketball Reference

Local media
- Television: KUTP; ASPN
- Radio: KTAR

The 1994–95 Phoenix Suns season was the 27th season for the Phoenix Suns in the National Basketball Association. The city of Phoenix, Arizona hosted the NBA All-Star weekend at the America West Arena this season.

== Season summary ==
=== Off-season ===
During the off-season, the Suns signed free agents, All-Star forward Danny Manning, Wayman Tisdale, and Danny Schayes. The team had the 23rd overall pick in the 1994 NBA draft, and selected shooting guard Wesley Person from the University of Auburn.

For the season, the Suns revealed new black alternate road uniforms, which featured a purple and orange trim, and a purple side panel with an orange outline on the left leg of their shorts; these uniforms would remain in use until 2000.

=== Regular season ===
With the addition of Manning, Tisdale and Person, the Suns won 10 of their first 13 games of the regular season, and posted a seven-game winning streak in December. The team posted another seven-game winning streak in January, and later on held the league's best record at 38–10 before the All-Star break. The Suns won eight of their final nine games of the season, and finished in first place in the Pacific Division with a 59–23 record, earning the second seed in the Western Conference. It was the first time in the team's franchise history, in which they had ended the season with 55 or more wins for three consecutive seasons; the Suns qualified for the NBA playoffs for the seventh consecutive year.

Charles Barkley averaged 23.0 points, 11.1 rebounds, 4.1 assists and 1.6 steals per game, while Manning averaged 17.9 points and 6.0 rebounds per game, but only appeared in just 46 games due to a torn ligament in his left knee, which sidelined him for the remainder of the regular season, as he did not appear in any NBA playoff games for the Suns. In addition, Kevin Johnson provided the team with 15.5 points and 7.7 assists per game, despite only playing just 47 games due to injuries, while three-point specialist Dan Majerle contributed 15.6 points and 4.1 assists per game, and finished the season tied for second with 199 three-point field goals, and A.C. Green provided with 11.2 points and 8.2 rebounds per game. Meanwhile, Person contributed 10.4 points per game and 116 three-point field goals, and was named to the NBA All-Rookie Second Team, while Tisdale contributed 10.0 points per game, Elliot Perry played most of the regular season as the team's starting point guard in Johnson's absence, as he averaged 9.7 points, 4.8 assists and led the Suns with 1.9 steals per game, and Danny Ainge contributed 7.7 points per game off the bench.

During the NBA All-Star weekend at the America West Arena in Phoenix, Barkley and Majerle were both selected for the 1995 NBA All-Star Game, as members of the Western Conference All-Star team, while head coach Paul Westphal was selected to coach the Western Conference; it was the ninth All-Star selection for Barkley, and the third and final selection for Majerle. In addition, Majerle also participated in the NBA Three-Point Shootout, while Person and undrafted rookie point guard Trevor Ruffin were both selected for the NBA Rookie Game, as members of the White team. After the regular season had ended, Barkley was named to the All-NBA Second Team, and also finished in sixth place in Most Valuable Player voting, while Perry finished in second place in Most Improved Player voting, behind Dana Barros of the Philadelphia 76ers.

The Suns finished seventh in the NBA in home-game attendance, with an attendance of 779,943 at the America West Arena during the regular season.

=== NBA playoffs ===
In the Western Conference First Round of the 1995 NBA playoffs, the Suns faced off against the 7th–seeded Portland Trail Blazers, a team that featured All-Star forward Clifford Robinson, Rod Strickland, and sixth man Otis Thorpe. The Suns won the first two games over the Trail Blazers at home at the America West Arena, before winning Game 3 on the road, 117–109 at the Memorial Coliseum to win the series in a three-game sweep.

In the Western Conference Semi-finals, and for the second consecutive year, the Suns faced off against the 6th–seeded, and defending NBA champion Houston Rockets, a team that featured All-Star center Hakeem Olajuwon, All-Star guard Clyde Drexler, and Robert Horry. The Suns won the first two games at the America West Arena, then after losing Game 3 to the Rockets on the road, 118–85 at The Summit, the Suns won Game 4 on the road, 114–110 to take a 3–1 series lead over the Rockets. However, the Rockets managed to win the next three games, as the Suns lost Game 7 to the Rockets at the America West Arena, 115–114, thus losing in a hard-fought seven-game series.

The Rockets would go on to defeat the Orlando Magic in a four-game sweep in the 1995 NBA Finals, winning their second consecutive NBA championship.

=== Aftermath ===
Following the season, Majerle was traded to the Cleveland Cavaliers after seven seasons with the Suns, while Ainge retired. Meanwhile, Richard Dumas signed as a free agent with the Philadelphia 76ers, Schayes signed with the Miami Heat during the next season, and Ruffin was left unprotected in the 1995 NBA expansion draft, where he was selected by the Vancouver Grizzlies expansion team.

== Draft picks ==
Round	Pick	Player	Position	Nationality	College / Team
1	23	Wesley Person	SG/SF	United States	Auburn
2	29	Antonio Lang	SF	United States	Duke
2	50	Charles Claxton	C	United States Virgin Islands	Georgia
2	52	Anthony Goldwire	PG	United States	Houston

== Roster ==
1994–95 Phoenix Suns roster
Players

Pos.	No.	Player	Height	Weight	DOB	From
G	22	Danny Ainge	6 ft 4 in (1.93 m)	175 lb (79 kg)	1959–03–17	BYU
F	34	Charles Barkley	6 ft 6 in (1.98 m)	252 lb (114 kg)	1963–02–20	Auburn
F	12	Richard Dumas	6 ft 7 in (2.01 m)	200 lb (91 kg)	1969–05–19	Oklahoma State
F	45	A.C. Green	6 ft 9 in (2.06 m)	220 lb (100 kg)	1963–10–04	Oregon State
G	7	Kevin Johnson	6 ft 1 in (1.85 m)	180 lb (82 kg)	1966–03–04	California
C	35	Joe Kleine	6 ft 11 in (2.11 m)	255 lb (116 kg)	1962–01–04	Arkansas
F	21	Antonio Lang (injured)	6 ft 8 in (2.03 m)	205 lb (93 kg)	1972–05–15	Duke
G	9	Dan Majerle	6 ft 6 in (1.98 m)	215 lb (98 kg)	1965–09–09	Central Michigan
F	15	Danny Manning (injured)	6 ft 10 in (2.08 m)	230 lb (104 kg)	1966–05–17	Kansas
G	2	Elliot Perry	6 ft 0 in (1.83 m)	150 lb (68 kg)	1969–03–28	Memphis
G	11	Wesley Person	6 ft 6 in (1.98 m)	195 lb (88 kg)	1971–03–28	Auburn
G	8	Trevor Ruffin	6 ft 1 in (1.85 m)	185 lb (84 kg)	1970–09–26	Hawaiʻi
C	24	Danny Schayes	6 ft 11 in (2.11 m)	235 lb (107 kg)	1959–05–10	Syracuse
F	23	Wayman Tisdale	6 ft 9 in (2.06 m)	240 lb (109 kg)	1964–06–09	Oklahoma

Coaches
Head coach
- Paul Westphal
Assistant(s)
- Lionel Hollins
- Scotty Robertson

Legend
- (DP) Unsigned draft pick
- (FA) Free agent
- (S) Suspended
- Injured

== Regular season ==
=== Standings ===
Pacific Division	W	L	PCT	GB	Home	Road	Div
y-Phoenix Suns	59	23	.720	—	32–9	27–14	23–7
x-Seattle SuperSonics	57	25	.695	2	32–9	25–16	16–14
x-Los Angeles Lakers	48	34	.585	11	29–12	19–22	15–15
x-Portland Trail Blazers	44	38	.537	15	26–15	18–23	17–13
Sacramento Kings	39	43	.476	20	27–14	12–29	17–13
Golden State Warriors	26	56	.317	33	15–26	11–30	11–19
Los Angeles Clippers	17	65	.207	42	13–28	4–37	6–24

#	Western Conference				
#	Team	W	L	PCT	GB
1	z-San Antonio Spurs	62	20	.756	–
2	y-Phoenix Suns	59	23	.720	3
3	x-Utah Jazz	60	22	.732	2
4	x-Seattle SuperSonics	57	25	.695	5
5	x-Los Angeles Lakers	48	34	.585	14
6	x-Houston Rockets	47	35	.573	15
7	x-Portland Trail Blazers	44	38	.537	18
8	x-Denver Nuggets	41	41	.500	21
9	Sacramento Kings	39	43	.476	23
10	Dallas Mavericks	36	46	.439	26
11	Golden State Warriors	26	56	.317	36
12	Minnesota Timberwolves	21	61	.256	41
13	Los Angeles Clippers	17	65	.207	45

== Regular season ==
=== Game log ===
1994–95 game log
Total: 59–23 (home: 32–9; road: 27–14)
November: 10–4 (home: 7–0; road: 3–4)

Game	Date	Team	Score	High points	High rebounds	High assists	Location Attendance	Record

December: 11–3 (home: 7–1; road: 4–2)

Game	Date	Team	Score	High points	High rebounds	High assists	Location Attendance	Record
24	December 22, 1994; 6:00 p.m. MST	@ Houston	L 106–114	Manning (23)	Barkley (14)	Manning, Perry (6)	The Summit; 16,611	18–6

January: 13–2 (home: 4–1; road: 9–1)

Game	Date	Team	Score	High points	High rebounds	High assists	Location Attendance	Record

February: 8–5 (home: 6–3; road: 2–2)

Game	Date	Team	Score	High points	High rebounds	High assists	Location Attendance	Record
46	February 5, 1995; 1:30 p.m. MST	Houston	L 100–124	Barkley (24)	Barkley (11)	Barkley (7)	America West Arena; 19,023	36–10
All-Star Break

March: 9–6 (home: 3–4; road: 6–2)

Game	Date	Team	Score	High points	High rebounds	High assists	Location Attendance	Record
60	March 7, 1995; 6:00 p.m. MST	@ Houston	W 113–102	Barkley (26)	Barkley (14)	Johnson (11)	The Summit; 16,611	46–14
68	March 24, 1995; 7:00 p.m. MST	Houston	L 97–99	Barkley (34)	Barkley (26)	Johnson (10)	America West Arena; 19,023	49–19

April: 8–3 (home: 5–0; road: 3–3)

Game	Date	Team	Score	High points	High rebounds	High assists	Location Attendance	Record

1994–95 schedule

== Playoffs ==
=== Game log ===
1995 playoff game log
First Round: 3–0 (home: 2–0; road: 1–0)

Game	Date	Team	Score	High points	High rebounds	High assists	Location Attendance	Series
1	April 28	Portland	W 129–102	Charles Barkley (29)	Charles Barkley (16)	Kevin Johnson (10)	America West Arena; 19,023	1–0
2	April 30	Portland	W 103–94	Kevin Johnson (28)	A.C. Green (15)	Kevin Johnson (6)	America West Arena; 19,023	2–0
3	May 2	@ Portland	W 117–109	Charles Barkley (47)	Charles Barkley (12)	Kevin Johnson (11)	Memorial Coliseum; 12,888	3–0

Conference semifinals: 3–4 (home: 2–2; road: 1–2)

Game	Date	Team	Score	High points	High rebounds	High assists	Location Attendance	Series
1	May 9, 1995; 7:30 p.m. MST	Houston	W 130–108	Barkley (26)	Green (15)	Johnson (13)	America West Arena; 19,023	1–0
2	May 11, 1995; 7:30 p.m. MST	Houston	W 118–94	Barkley (30)	Green (14)	Johnson (12)	America West Arena; 19,023	2–0
3	May 13, 1995; 10:00 a.m. MST	@ Houston	L 85–118	Johnson (14)	Green (9)	Ainge, Barkley, Johnson (4)	The Summit; 16,611	2–1
4	May 14, 1995; 10:00 a.m. MST	@ Houston	W 114–110	Johnson (43)	Green (12)	Johnson (9)	The Summit; 16,611	3–1
5	May 16, 1995; 7:30 p.m. MST	Houston	L 97–103 (OT)	Johnson (28)	Barkley, Green (20)	Johnson (8)	America West Arena; 19,023	3–2
6	May 18, 1995; 5:30 p.m. MST	@ Houston	L 103–116	Barkley (34)	Barkley (14)	Johnson (10)	The Summit; 16,611	3–3
7	May 20, 1995; 12:30 p.m. MST	Houston	L 114–115	Johnson (46)	Barkley (23)	Johnson (10)	America West Arena; 19,023	3–4

1995 schedule

== Awards and honors ==
=== Week/Month ===
- Elliot Perry was named Player of the Week for games played November 14 through November 20.
- Charles Barkley was named Player of the Week for games played February 13 through February 19.

=== All-Star ===
- Charles Barkley was voted as a starter for the Western Conference in the All-Star Game. It was his ninth consecutive All-Star selection. Barkley finished first in voting among Western Conference forwards with 1,046,105 votes.
- Dan Majerle was voted as a starter for the Western Conference in the All-Star Game. It was his third All-Star selection. Majerle finished first in voting among Western Conference guards with 868,115 votes.
- Paul Westphal coached the Western Conference in the All-Star Game, which was held in Phoenix for the second time. The West defeated the East 139–112.
- Other Suns players receiving All-Star votes were: Danny Manning (327,554).
- Dan Majerle was selected to compete in the Three-Point Shootout. Majerle was eliminated in the first round.
- Wesley Person and Trevor Ruffin were selected to play in the Rookie Challenge.

=== Season ===
- Charles Barkley was named to the All-NBA Second Team. Barkley also finished sixth in MVP voting.
- Wesley Person was named to the NBA All-Rookie Second Team.
- Elliot Perry finished second in Most Improved Player voting.

== Injuries/Missed games ==
- 10/08/94: Richard Dumas: League suspension (failed drug test); reinstated March 13
- 11/03/94: Charles Barkley: Strained stomach muscle; placed on injured list until November 26
- 11/03/94: Aaron Swinson: Sprained ankle; placed on injured list until November 15
- 11/11/94: Kevin Johnson: Sprained rib cage muscle; out until November 18
- 11/12/94: Danny Ainge: Flu; did not play
- 11/15/94: Antonio Lang: Back spasms; placed on injured list until February 6
- 11/16/94: Wayman Tisdale: Sprained ankle; out until November 29
- 11/23/94: Kevin Johnson: Sore knee; did not play
- 11/26/94: Kevin Johnson: Strained groin; placed on injured list until December 12
- 11/27/94: Charles Barkley: Strained stomach muscle; did not play
- 12/12/94: Kevin Johnson: Strained groin; did not play
- 12/12/94: Aaron Swinson: Knee tendinitis; placed on injured list until December 29
- 01/03/95: Kevin Johnson: Strained quadriceps; out until January 22
- 01/03/95: Wayman Tisdale: Flu; did not play
- 01/26/95: Kevin Johnson: Strained quadriceps; out until February 19
- 01/29/95: Wesley Person: Sore foot; out until February 3
- 02/03/95: Wayman Tisdale: Separated rib cartilage; out until February 17
- 02/06/95: Danny Manning: Torn ACL; placed on injured list for rest of season
- 02/17/95: Danny Ainge: League suspension (punched Chris Dudley on February 15); did not play
- 02/26/95: Joe Kleine: Personal reasons; did not play
- 02/28/95: Charles Barkley: Sprained knee; did not play
- 03/01/95: Charles Barkley: Sprained knee; did not play
- 03/14/95: Wayman Tisdale: Strained rib; placed on injured reserve until March 24
- 03/24/95: Trevor Ruffin: Bruised shoulder; did not play
- 03/24/95: Antonio Lang: Sprained knee; placed on injured list for rest of season
- 03/31/95: Richard Dumas: Urinary tract infection; did not play
- 04/02/95: Richard Dumas: Urinary tract infection; did not play
- 04/09/95: Danny Ainge: Bruised knee, sore back; did not play
- 04/09/95: Danny Ainge: Bruised knee, sore back; did not play
- 04/15/95: Charles Barkley: League suspension (exceeded flagrant foul limit); did not play
- 05/09/95: Richard Dumas: Bruised wrist; out until waived on May 18

== Player statistics ==
Legend
GP	Games played	GS	Games started	MPG	Minutes per game
FG%	Field-goal percentage	3P%	3-point field-goal percentage	FT%	Free-throw percentage
RPG	Rebounds per game	APG	Assists per game	SPG	Steals per game
BPG	Blocks per game	PPG	Points per game

=== Season ===
Player	GP	GS	MPG	FG%	3P%	FT%	RPG	APG	SPG	BPG	PPG
Danny Ainge	74	1	18.6	.460	.364	.808	1.5	2.8	.6	.1	7.7
Charles Barkley	68	66	35.0	.486	.338	.748	11.1	4.1	1.6	.7+	23.0
Richard Dumas	15	1	11.1	.507	.000	.500	1.9	0.5	.7	.1	5.5
A.C. Green	82	52	32.8	.504	.339	.732	8.2	1.5	.7	.4	11.2
Kevin Johnson	47	35	28.8	.470	.154	.810	2.4	7.7+	1.0	.4	15.5
Joe Kleine	75	42	12.9	.449	.000	.857#	3.5	0.5	.2	.2	3.7
Antonio Lang	12	0	4.4	.400	.	.750	0.3	0.1	.0	.2	0.9
Dan Majerle	82	46	37.7	.425	.363	.730	4.6	4.1	1.2	.5	15.6
Danny Manning	46	19	32.8	.547†	.286	.673	6.0	3.3	.9	1.2+	17.9
Elliot Perry	82	51	24.1	.520	.417	.810#	1.8	4.8+	1.9	.0	9.7
Wesley Person	78	56	23.1	.484	.436^	.792	2.6	1.3	.6	.3	10.4
Trevor Ruffin	49	1	6.5	.426	.384	.711	0.5	1.0	.3	.0	4.8
Danny Schayes	69	27	11.9	.508	1.000^	.725	3.0	1.3	.3	.5	4.4
Aaron Swinson	9	0	5.7	.556†	.	.800	0.9	0.3	.1	.0	2.7
Wayman Tisdale	65	13	19.6	.484	.	.770	3.8	0.7	.4	.4	10.0

† – Minimum 300 field goals made.
^ – Minimum 50 three-pointers made.
# – Minimum 125 free-throws made.
+ – Minimum 50 games played.

=== Playoffs ===
Player	GP	GS	MPG	FG%	3P%	FT%	RPG	APG	SPG	BPG	PPG
Danny Ainge	10	0	13.7	.500	.462	.909	1.0	1.0	.5	.0	6.0
Charles Barkley	10	10	39.0	.500	.257	.733	13.4	3.2	1.3	1.1	25.7
Richard Dumas	3	0	1.7	.250	.	.	0.3	0.0	.0	.0	0.7
A.C. Green	10	10	36.8	.462	.083	.873	12.0	1.3	.6	.2	12.8
Kevin Johnson	10	10	37.1	.573	.500	.845	4.1	9.3	.9	.4	24.8
Joe Kleine	10	10	16.7	.574	.500^	.	3.1	0.8	.5	.3	6.3
Dan Majerle	10	0	30.7	.370	.364	.706	3.1	1.7	1.4	.3	8.2
Elliot Perry	9	0	11.8	.476	.400	.800	1.1	1.3	.6	.0	6.9
Wesley Person	10	10	24.7	.410	.378	.917	2.1	1.1	.3	.2	9.6
Trevor Ruffin	3	0	2.2	.500	.250	.200	0.6	0.4	.2	.0	2.0
Danny Schayes	10	0	14.6	.379	.000	.875	2.0	0.8	.3	.3	2.9
Wayman Tisdale	10	0	17.0	.451	.000	.643	3.0	1.1	.0	.4	7.3

^ – Minimum 5 three-pointers made. Player statistics citation:

== Transactions ==
=== Trades ===
August 1, 1994	To Detroit Pistons (United States) Mark West	To Phoenix Suns 1996 second-round draft pick ( (United States) Russ Millard) 1999 second-round draft pick
September 23, 1994	To Los Angeles Lakers (United States) Cedric Ceballos	To Phoenix Suns 1995 first-round draft pick ( (United States) Michael Finley)

=== Free agents ===
==== Additions ====
Date	Player	Contract	Former Team
July 26, 1994	A.C. Green	Signed 5-year contract for $25 million	Phoenix Suns
September 3, 1994	Danny Manning	Signed 1-year contract for $1 million	Atlanta Hawks
September 15, 1994	Aaron Swinson	Undisclosed	Auburn Tigers
September 15, 1994	Winston Garland	Signed 1-year contract	Houston Rockets
September 16, 1994	Wayman Tisdale	Signed 1-year contract for $850,000	Sacramento Kings
September 30, 1994	Danny Schayes	Signed 1-year contract for $672,000	Los Angeles Lakers
November 10, 1994	Trevor Ruffin	Signed 1-year contract for $143,860	Hawaii Rainbow Warriors

==== Subtractions ====
Date	Player	Reason left	New team
July 1, 1994	Frank Johnson	Retired	—N/a
July 22, 1994	Skeeter Henry	Waived	Grand Rapids Hoops (CBA)
September 15, 1994	Jerrod Mustaf	Waived	P.A.O.K. Thessaloniki (Greece)
September 20, 1994	Oliver Miller	Free agent	Detroit Pistons
October 13, 1994	Duane Cooper	Waived	Omaha Racers (CBA)
November 1, 1994	Winston Garland	Waived	Minnesota Timberwolves
November 1, 1994	Anthony Goldwire	Waived	Yakima Sun Kings (CBA)
November 2, 1994	Malcolm Mackey	Waived	Omaha Racers (CBA)
December 29, 1994	Aaron Swinson	Waived	Yakima Sun Kings (CBA)
May 18, 1995	Richard Dumas	Waived	Philadelphia 76ers

Player Transactions Citation:
