= Antonio Harvey =

American basketball player

Personal information
- Born: July 6, 1970 (age 56) Pascagoula, Mississippi
- Listed height: 6 ft 11 in (2.11 m)
- Listed weight: 250 lb (113 kg)

Career information
- High school: Pascagoula (Pascagoula, Mississippi)
- College: Southern Illinois (1988–1989); Georgia (1990–1991); Pfeiffer (1991–1993)
- NBA draft: 1993: undrafted
- Playing career: 1993–2004
- Position: Power forward
- Number: 40, 24, 34, 4

Career history
- 1993–1995: Los Angeles Lakers
- 1995: Vancouver Grizzlies
- 1996: Los Angeles Clippers
- 1996–1997: Seattle SuperSonics
- 1997: CHC Montecatini
- 1997–1998: Panionios
- 1998: Covirán Cervezas Alhambra
- 1998–1999: Irakleio
- 1999–2001: Portland Trail Blazers
- 2001–2002: Seattle SuperSonics
- 2002–2003: Atlanta Hawks
- 2002–2003: Idaho Stampede
- 2003–2004: Polonia Warsaw

Career highlights
- As a player: 2× Greek League All-Star (1997, 1998); 2× Greek All-Star Game Slam Dunk champion (1997, 1998)
- Stats at NBA.com
- Stats at Basketball Reference

Antonio Harvey (born July 6, 1970) is an American former professional basketball player. During his pro club career, Harvey played in the National Basketball Association (NBA). He also played professionally in several other leagues overseas.

== College career ==
Born in Pascagoula, Mississippi, Harvey attended Pascagoula High, in Pascagoula, Mississippi, where he played high school basketball. After high school, Harvey played college basketball at Southern Illinois University. He played with the school's men's team, the Southern Illinois Salukis (1988–1989).

Harvey next played college basketball at Connors State College (1989–90), before moving to the University of Georgia, where he played with the Georgia Bulldogs (1990–1991). He then played college basketball at Pfeiffer University, where he played with the Pfeiffer Falcons, from 1991 to 1993.

== Professional career ==
Harvey was bypassed in the 1993 NBA draft. After playing during the summer 1993, with the Atlanta Eagles of the USBL, he signed as a free agent in 1993, with the NBA's Los Angeles Lakers, for whom he started on opening night of the 1993–94 season. In 1995, Harvey competed in the NBA Slam Dunk Contest. In the contest, he is remembered for when he waited until the final seconds, to do a 360-degree dunk, but missed it, as he ended up in 4th place. He played with five other NBA teams, as well as in Greece, Spain, Poland and Italy.

== Coaching career ==
In April 2004, Harvey was named the general manager and head coach of the American Basketball Association's Portland Reign.

== Broadcasting career ==
Harvey was in radio broadcasting for the Portland Trail Blazers, from 2005 to 2016.

== Career statistics ==
Legend
GP	Games played	GS	Games started	MPG	Minutes per game
FG%	Field goal percentage	3P%	3-point field goal percentage	FT%	Free throw percentage
RPG	Rebounds per game	APG	Assists per game	SPG	Steals per game
BPG	Blocks per game	PPG	Points per game	**Bold**	Career high

=== NBA ===
==== Regular season ====
Year	Team	GP	GS	MPG	FG%	3P%	FT%	RPG	APG	SPG	BPG	PPG
1993–94	L.A. Lakers	27	6	9.1	.367	–	.462	2.2	.2	.3	.7	2.6
1994–95	L.A. Lakers	**59**	8	9.7	.438	**1.000**	.533	1.7	.4	.3	.7	3.0
1995–96	Vancouver	18	6	**22.8**	.411	.000	.465	**5.2**	.5	**.8**	**1.2**	**5.4**
1995–96	L.A. Clippers	37	**9**	11.1	.341	–	.450	2.9	.2	.4	.7	2.9
1996–97	Seattle	6	0	4.3	.455	–	**.833**	1.7	.2	.0	.7	2.5
1999–00	Portland	19	0	7.2	**.567**	–	.583	1.7	.3	.1	.3	2.2
2000–01	Portland	12	0	6.0	.464	–	**.833**	1.2	.3	.1	.5	2.6
2001–02	Seattle	5	3	9.4	.333	–	.500	1.8	**1.0**	.2	.6	1.8
2002–03	Atlanta	4	0	8.0	.400	–	–	1.5	.0	.3	1.0	1.0
Career		187	32	10.4	.407	.333	.511	2.3	.3	.3	.7	3.0

==== Playoffs ====
Year	Team	GP	GS	MPG	FG%	3P%	FT%	RPG	APG	SPG	BPG	PPG
1995	L.A. Lakers	**3**	0	1.3	–	–	–	.3	.0	.0	.0	.0
2001	Portland	2	0	**7.0**	.000	–	–	**3.0**	.0	.0	.0	.0
Career		5	0	3.6	.000	–	–	1.4	.0	.0	.0	.0
