= 1994–95 San Antonio Spurs season =

- Division champions
- Head coach: Bob Hill
- President: Gregg Popovich (vice)
- General manager: Gregg Popovich
- Owner: Peter Holt
- Arena: Alamodome

Results
- Record: 62–20 (.756)
- Place: Division: 1st (Midwest); Conference: 1st (Western)
- Playoff finish: Western Conference finals (lost to Rockets 2–4)
- Stats at Basketball Reference

Local media
- Television: KSAT-TV; KABB; Prime Sports Southwest
- Radio: WOAI

The 1994–95 San Antonio Spurs season was the 19th season for the San Antonio Spurs in the National Basketball Association, and their 28th season as a franchise.

== Season summary ==
=== Off-season ===
During the off-season, the Spurs hired Bob Hill as their new head coach, re-acquired Sean Elliott after playing one year with the Detroit Pistons, re-signed Avery Johnson after one season with the Golden State Warriors, and signed free agents Chuck Person, and former All-Star forward Moses Malone.

=== Regular season ===
Early into the regular season, the Spurs signed free agent Doc Rivers, who was previously released by the New York Knicks. Under Hill, and despite the return of Elliott and Johnson, along with the addition of Person, the Spurs struggled and played below .500 in winning percentage with a slow 7–9 start to the regular season, as Dennis Rodman served two suspensions early into the season. However, the team won 13 of their next 14 games, which included a seven-game winning streak in December, and a six-game winning streak between December and January. The Spurs posted an eight-game winning streak between January and February, and held a 30–15 record at the All-Star break.

The team posted another eight-game winning streak between February and March, posted a 15-game winning streak between March and April, and then posted a six-game winning streak to close the season, winning 21 of their final 23 games. The Spurs won the Midwest Division title by finishing with a league-best 62–20 record, and earning the first seed in the Western Conference. It was also their best regular-season record in franchise history, surpassing the 56-win 1989–90 season, which would be surpassed eleven seasons later by the 2005–06 team (63–19), and then ten seasons later by the 2015–16 squad (67–15). The Spurs qualified for the NBA playoffs for the sixth consecutive year.

David Robinson averaged 27.6 points, 10.8 rebounds and 3.2 blocks per game, and was named the NBA Most Valuable Player of the Year, and was also named to the All-NBA First Team. In addition, Elliott averaged 18.1 points per game and contributed 136 three-point field goals, while Johnson provided the team with 13.4 points, 8.2 assists and 1.4 steals per game, Vinny Del Negro contributed 12.5 points per game, and Rodman, who only played just 49 games, averaged 7.1 points, and led the league with 16.8 rebounds per game, and was named to the All-NBA Third Team. Off the bench, Person played a sixth man role, averaging 10.8 points per game and leading the Spurs with 172 three-point field-goals, while J.R. Reid averaged 7.0 points and 4.9 rebounds per game, and Terry Cummings provided with 6.8 points and 5.0 rebounds per game.

During the NBA All-Star weekend at the America West Arena in Phoenix, Arizona, Robinson was selected for the 1995 NBA All-Star Game, as a member of the Western Conference All-Star team, while Person participated in the NBA Three-Point Shootout. Both Robinson and Rodman were named to the NBA All-Defensive First Team; Robinson also finished in fourth place in Defensive Player of the Year voting, while Rodman finished in fifth place, Johnson finished in sixth place in Most Improved Player voting, Person finished in third place in Sixth Man of the Year voting, and Hill finished in third place in Coach of the Year voting.

The Spurs finished third in the NBA in home-game attendance, with an attendance of 920,413 at the Alamodome during the regular season.

=== NBA playoffs ===
In the Western Conference First Round of the 1995 NBA playoffs, the Spurs faced off against the 8th–seeded Denver Nuggets, a team that featured All-Star center, and Defensive Player of the Year, Dikembe Mutombo, Mahmoud Abdul-Rauf, and former Spurs forward Reggie Williams. The Spurs won the first two games over the Nuggets at home at the Alamodome, before winning Game 3 on the road, 99–95 at the McNichols Sports Arena to win the series in a three-game sweep.

In the Western Conference Semi-finals, the team faced off against the 5th–seeded Los Angeles Lakers, who were led by the trio of All-Star forward Cedric Ceballos, second-year star Nick Van Exel, and Vlade Divac. The Spurs took a 3–1 series lead over the Lakers, before losing Game 5 at the Alamodome in overtime, 98–96. The Spurs won Game 6 over the Lakers on the road, 100–88 at the Great Western Forum to win the series in six games.

In the Western Conference Finals, the Spurs then faced off against the 6th–seeded, and defending NBA champion Houston Rockets, a team that featured All-Star center Hakeem Olajuwon, All-Star guard Clyde Drexler, and Robert Horry. Both teams lacked home-court advantage in the series, as the Spurs lost the first two games to the Rockets at the Alamodome, but managed to win the next two games on the road at The Summit, before losing Game 5 at the Alamodome, 111–90. The road team won every game in the series until the Rockets won Game 6 over the Spurs at The Summit, 100–95, as the Spurs lost the series in six games.

The Rockets would go on to defeat the Orlando Magic in a four-game sweep in the 1995 NBA Finals, winning their second consecutive NBA championship.

=== Aftermath ===
Following the season, the controversial Rodman was traded to the Chicago Bulls after only two seasons with the Spurs, while Terry Cummings re-signed as a free agent with his former team, the Milwaukee Bucks, and Willie Anderson was left unprotected in the 1995 NBA expansion draft, where he was selected by the Toronto Raptors expansion team. Meanwhile, Malone, who only played just 17 games this season due to a ruptured tendon in his right leg, retired after nineteen seasons in the NBA.

== Draft picks ==
Round	Pick	Player	Position	Nationality	College
1	22	Bill Curley	Forward	United States	Boston College

== Roster ==
1994–95 San Antonio Spurs roster
Players

Pos.	No.	Player	Height	Weight	DOB	From
G/F	40	Willie Anderson	6 ft 7 in (2.01 m)	190 lb (86 kg)	1967–01–08	Georgia
F/C	34	Terry Cummings	6 ft 9 in (2.06 m)	220 lb (100 kg)	1961–03–15	DePaul
G	15	Vinny Del Negro	6 ft 4 in (1.93 m)	185 lb (84 kg)	1966–08–09	NC State
F	32	Sean Elliott	6 ft 8 in (2.03 m)	205 lb (93 kg)	1968–02–02	Arizona
F/C	54	Jack Haley	6 ft 10 in (2.08 m)	240 lb (109 kg)	1964–01–27	UCLA
G	6	Avery Johnson	5 ft 10 in (1.78 m)	175 lb (79 kg)	1965–03–25	Southern
C	2	Moses Malone (injured)	6 ft 10 in (2.08 m)	215 lb (98 kg)	1955–03–23	Petersburg HS (VA)
C	00	Julius Nwosu	6 ft 10 in (2.08 m)	255 lb (116 kg)	1971–05–01	Liberty
F	45	Chuck Person	6 ft 8 in (2.03 m)	220 lb (100 kg)	1964–06–27	Auburn
F/C	7	J. R. Reid	6 ft 9 in (2.06 m)	247 lb (112 kg)	1968–03–31	North Carolina
G	25	Doc Rivers	6 ft 4 in (1.93 m)	185 lb (84 kg)	1961–10–13	Marquette
C	50	David Robinson	7 ft 1 in (2.16 m)	235 lb (107 kg)	1965–08–06	Navy
F	10	Dennis Rodman	6 ft 7 in (2.01 m)	210 lb (95 kg)	1961–05–13	SE Oklahoma State

Coaches
Head coach
- Bob Hill
Assistant(s)
- Dave Cowens
- Hank Egan
- Paul Pressey

Legend
- (DP) Unsigned draft pick
- (FA) Free agent
- (S) Suspended
- Injured

Roster

== Regular season ==
=== Season standings ===
Midwest Division	W	L	PCT	GB	Home	Road	Div
z-San Antonio Spurs	62	20	.756	—	33–8	29–12	20–6
x-Utah Jazz	60	22	.732	2	33–8	27–14	17–9
x-Houston Rockets	47	35	.573	15	25–16	22–19	13–13
x-Denver Nuggets	41	41	.500	21	23–18	18–23	13–13
Dallas Mavericks	36	46	.439	26	19–22	17–24	11–15
Minnesota Timberwolves	21	61	.256	41	13–28	8–33	4–22

#	Western Conference				
#	Team	W	L	PCT	GB
1	z-San Antonio Spurs	62	20	.756	–
2	y-Phoenix Suns	59	23	.720	3
3	x-Utah Jazz	60	22	.732	2
4	x-Seattle SuperSonics	57	25	.695	5
5	x-Los Angeles Lakers	48	34	.585	14
6	x-Houston Rockets	47	35	.573	15
7	x-Portland Trail Blazers	44	38	.537	18
8	x-Denver Nuggets	41	41	.500	21
9	Sacramento Kings	39	43	.476	23
10	Dallas Mavericks	36	46	.439	26
11	Golden State Warriors	26	56	.317	36
12	Minnesota Timberwolves	21	61	.256	41
13	Los Angeles Clippers	17	65	.207	45

=== Season opener delayed ===
On November 4, 1994, the Spurs' regular season opener at home against the Golden State Warriors was delayed for more than 50 minutes, after the Alamodome's sprinkler system accidentally went off. The cause was a sensor getting triggered by the fireworks display the team put on during the player introductions. Most of those soaked were the fans who were seated in the season ticket area, and they took it in stride. The game eventually went on as scheduled, with the Spurs losing to the Warriors by a score of 123–118.

=== Dennis Rodman ===
Dennis Rodman helped the Spurs to their then-franchise best win–loss record of 62–20, and they made it to the Western Conference finals. However, his increasingly erratic off-court life, including a brief but heavily publicized relationship with singer Madonna, and on-court antics, such as dyeing his hair and starting on-court arguments, resulted in him being traded to the Chicago Bulls after only two seasons with the Spurs.

== Game log ==
=== Regular season ===
1994–95 game log
Total: 62–20 (home: 33–8; road: 29–12)
November: 6–7 (home: 5–3; road: 1–4)

Game	Date	Team	Score	High points	High rebounds	High assists	Location Attendance	Record

December: 9–3 (home: 5–2; road: 4–1)

Game	Date	Team	Score	High points	High rebounds	High assists	Location Attendance	Record
17	December 10, 1994; 7:30 p.m. CST	@ Houston	W 108–96	Johnson (24)	David Robinson\Robinson (11)	Johnson (11)	The Summit; 16,611	8–9
22	December 23, 1994; 7:30 p.m. CST	Houston	W 98–96	Del Negro (26)	Reid, Robinson (10)	Johnson (11)	Alamodome; 31,514	13–9

January: 11–4 (home: 4–1; road: 7–3)

Game	Date	Team	Score	High points	High rebounds	High assists	Location Attendance	Record
31	January 13, 1995; 7:30 p.m. CST	@ Houston	L 100–103	Robinson (23)	Robinson (10)	Johnson (9)	The Summit; 16,611	20–11
38	January 26, 1995; 7:30 p.m. CST	Houston	W 103–100	Elliott (26)	Rodman (22)	Johnson (11)	Alamodome; 33,360	24–14

February: 11–2 (home: 7–0; road: 4–2)

Game	Date	Team	Score	High points	High rebounds	High assists	Location Attendance	Record
All-Star Break
49	February 21, 1995; 7:00 p.m. CST	@ Houston	W 98–97	Del Negro (23)	Rodman (30)	Johnson (8)	The Summit; 16,611	33–16

March: 14–2 (home: 8–1; road: 6–1)

Game	Date	Team	Score	High points	High rebounds	High assists	Location Attendance	Record
54	March 3, 1995; 7:30 p.m. CST	Orlando	W 112–111	Robinson (24)	Rodman (20)	Johnson (9)	Alamodome; 35,818	38–16
55	March 5, 1995; 12 Noon CST	Houston	W 124–103	Robinson (31)	Rodman (27)	Johnson (10)	Alamodome; 35,818	39–16
59	March 12, 1995; 11:00 a.m. CST	@ Orlando	L 104–110	Robinson (34)	Rodman (23)	Johnson (6)	Orlando Arena; 16,010	41–18

April: 11–2 (home: 4–1; road: 7–1)

Game	Date	Team	Score	High points	High rebounds	High assists	Location Attendance	Record

1994–95 schedule

== Playoffs ==
1995 playoff game log
First Round: 3–0 (home: 2–0; road: 1–0)

Game	Date	Team	Score	High points	High rebounds	High assists	Location Attendance	Series
1	April 28	Denver	W 104–88	Sean Elliott (21)	Dennis Rodman (11)	Avery Johnson (8)	Alamodome; 25,235	1–0
2	April 30	Denver	W 122–96	Robinson, Rodman (19)	Dennis Rodman (16)	Avery Johnson (9)	Alamodome	2–0
3	May 2	@ Denver	W 99–95	Robinson, Johnson (24)	Dennis Rodman (13)	David Robinson (5)	McNichols Sports Arena; 17,171	3–0

Conference semifinals: 4–2 (home: 2–1; road: 2–1)

Game	Date	Team	Score	High points	High rebounds	High assists	Location Attendance	Series
1	May 6	L.A. Lakers	W 110–94	David Robinson (33)	Dennis Rodman (12)	Avery Johnson (12)	Alamodome; 24,002	1–0
2	May 8	L.A. Lakers	W 97–90 (OT)	Robinson, Rodman (22)	Dennis Rodman (22)	Avery Johnson (9)	Alamodome; 26,127	2–0
3	May 12	@ L.A. Lakers	L 85–92	David Robinson (34)	David Robinson (13)	Avery Johnson (8)	Great Western Forum; 17,505	2–1
4	May 14	@ L.A. Lakers	W 80–71	David Robinson (26)	David Robinson (22)	Avery Johnson (7)	Great Western Forum; 17,505	3–1
5	May 16	L.A. Lakers	L 96–98 (OT)	David Robinson (34)	David Robinson (17)	Avery Johnson (12)	Alamodome; 35,888	3–2
6	May 18	@ L.A. Lakers	W 100–88	David Robinson (31)	David Robinson (15)	Avery Johnson (11)	Great Western Forum; 17,505	4–2

Conference finals: 2–4 (home: 0–3; road: 2–1)

Game	Date	Team	Score	High points	High rebounds	High assists	Location Attendance	Series
1	May 22, 1995; 7:30 p.m. CDT	Houston	L 93–94	Elliott (24)	Rodman (20)	Johnson (9)	Alamodome; 33,337	0–1
2	May 24, 1995; 7:30 p.m. CDT	Houston	L 96–106	Robinson (32)	Robinson (12)	Elliott, Anderson (5)	Alamodome; 35,888	0–2
3	May 26, 1995; 8:00 p.m. CDT	@ Houston	W 107–102	Robinson (29)	Rodman (14)	Johnson (13)	The Summit; 16,611	1–2
4	May 28, 1995; 2:30 p.m. CDT	@ Houston	W 103–81	Robinson (20)	Rodman (19)	Johnson, Del Negro (4)	The Summit; 16,611	2–2
5	May 30, 1995; 8:00 p.m. CDT	Houston	L 90–111	Robinson (22)	Robinson, Rodman (12)	Johnson (7)	Alamodome; 35,888	2–3
6	June 1, 1995; 8:00 p.m. CDT	@ Houston	L 95–100	Robinson, Johnson (19)	Rodman (17)	Johnson (10)	The Summit; 16,611	2–4

1995 schedule

== Player statistics ==
=== Regular season ===
Player	POS	GP	GS	MP	REB	AST	STL	BLK	PTS	MPG	RPG	APG	SPG	BPG	PPG
Avery Johnson	PG	82	82	3,011	208	670	114	13	1,101	36.7	2.5	8.2	1.4	.2	13.4
David Robinson	C	81	81	3,074	877	236	134	262	2,238	38.0	10.8	2.9	1.7	3.2	27.6
Sean Elliott	SF	81	81	2,858	287	206	78	38	1,466	35.3	3.5	2.5	1.0	.5	18.1
J. R. Reid	PF	81	37	1,566	393	55	60	32	563	19.3	4.9	.7	.7	.4	7.0
Chuck Person	SF	81	1	2,033	258	106	45	12	872	25.1	3.2	1.3	.6	.1	10.8
Terry Cummings	PF	76	20	1,273	378	59	36	19	520	16.8	5.0	.8	.5	.3	6.8
Vinny Del Negro	SG	75	71	2,360	192	226	61	14	938	31.5	2.6	3.0	.8	.2	12.5
Doc Rivers^{†}	PG	60	0	942	100	154	61	21	302	15.7	1.7	2.6	1.0	.4	5.0
Dennis Rodman	PF	49	26	1,568	823	97	31	23	349	32.0	16.8	2.0	.6	.5	7.1
Willie Anderson	SG	38	11	556	55	52	26	10	185	14.6	1.4	1.4	.7	.3	4.9
Jack Haley	PF	31	0	117	27	2	3	5	73	3.8	.9	.1	.1	.2	2.4
Chris Whitney	PG	25	0	179	13	28	4	0	42	7.2	.5	1.1	.2	.0	1.7
Julius Nwosu	C	23	0	84	24	3	0	3	31	3.7	1.0	.1	.0	.1	1.3
Moses Malone	C	17	0	149	46	6	2	3	49	8.8	2.7	.4	.1	.2	2.9
Howard Eisley^{†}	PG	15	0	56	6	18	0	1	7	3.7	.4	1.2	.0	.1	.5
Corey Crowder	SF	7	0	29	3	1	1	0	6	4.1	.4	.1	.1	.0	.9

- ^{†} Denotes player spent time with another team in the season. Stats reflect time with the Spurs only.

=== Playoffs ===
Player	POS	GP	GS	MP	REB	AST	STL	BLK	PTS	MPG	RPG	APG	SPG	BPG	PPG
David Robinson	C	15	15	623	182	47	22	39	380	41.5	12.1	3.1	1.5	2.6	25.3
Avery Johnson	PG	15	15	575	32	125	20	6	218	38.3	2.1	8.3	1.3	.4	14.5
Sean Elliott	SF	15	15	574	72	40	10	7	260	38.3	4.8	2.7	.7	.5	17.3
Vinny Del Negro	SG	15	15	382	32	37	8	2	131	25.5	2.1	2.5	.5	.1	8.7
Terry Cummings	PF	15	2	135	31	4	5	1	58	9.0	2.1	.3	.3	.1	3.9
J. R. Reid	PF	15	1	209	42	9	7	4	91	13.9	2.8	.6	.5	.3	6.1
Doc Rivers	PG	15	0	318	29	24	14	9	117	21.2	1.9	1.6	.9	.6	7.8
Chuck Person	SF	15	0	258	27	8	4	7	75	17.2	1.8	.5	.3	.5	5.0
Dennis Rodman	PF	14	12	459	207	18	12	0	124	32.8	14.8	1.3	.9	.0	8.9
Willie Anderson	SG	11	0	97	12	10	5	0	20	8.8	1.1	.9	.5	.0	1.8
Jack Haley	PF	4	0	13	6	0	0	1	3	3.3	1.5	.0	.0	.3	.8
Julius Nwosu	C	2	0	7	2	0	0	0	0	3.5	1.0	.0	.0	.0	.0

== Awards and records ==
- David Robinson, NBA Most Valuable Player
- David Robinson, NBA All-Star
- David Robinson, All-NBA First Team
- David Robinson, All-NBA First Defensive Team
- Dennis Rodman, All-NBA First Defensive Team
- Dennis Rodman, All-NBA Third Team
