= 1994–95 Los Angeles Lakers season =

NBA professional basketball team season

- Head coach: Del Harris
- General manager: Jerry West
- Owner: Jerry Buss
- Arena: Great Western Forum

Results
- Record: 48–34 (.585)
- Place: Division: 3rd (Pacific); Conference: 5th (Western)
- Playoff finish: Conference semifinals (lost to Spurs 2–4)
- Stats at Basketball Reference

Local media
- Television: KCAL-TV; Prime Sports West
- Radio: KLAC

The 1994–95 Los Angeles Lakers season was the 47th season for the Los Angeles Lakers in the National Basketball Association, and their 35th season in Los Angeles, California. This was the first season since 1981–82 that All-Star forward James Worthy was not on the team, as he announced his retirement in November.

== Season summary ==
=== Off-season ===
After missing the NBA playoffs the previous season, the Lakers received the tenth overall pick in the 1994 NBA draft, and selected shooting guard Eddie Jones out of Temple University. During the off-season, the team acquired Cedric Ceballos from the Phoenix Suns, and hired Del Harris as their new head coach.

=== Regular season ===
Under Harris, and with the addition of Ceballos and Jones, the Lakers struggled with a 3–5 start to the regular season, but then won ten of their next twelve games, and later on held a 29–16 record at the All-Star break. Despite losing seven of their final eight games of the season, the Lakers finished in third place in the Pacific Division with a 48–34 record, earned the fifth seed in the Western Conference, and returned to the NBA playoffs after a one-year absence. Harris was named the NBA Coach of the Year, after leading the Lakers to a 15-game improvement over the previous season.

Ceballos averaged 21.7 points and 8.0 rebounds per game, but only played 58 games due to a thumb injury, while second-year star Nick Van Exel averaged 16.9 points and 8.3 assists per game, and led the Lakers with 183 three-point field goals, and Vlade Divac provided the team with 16.0 points, 10.4 rebounds, 1.4 steals and 2.2 blocks per game. In addition, Jones contributed 14.0 points and 2.0 steals per game, and was named to the NBA All-Rookie First Team, but only played 64 games due to a shoulder injury, and Elden Campbell provided with 12.5 points, 6.1 rebounds and 1.8 blocks per game. Off the bench, Anthony Peeler contributed 10.4 points per game, while Sedale Threatt averaged 9.5 points and 4.2 assists per game, second-year forward George Lynch provided with 6.1 points per game, Tony Smith contributed 5.6 points per game, and Sam Bowie averaged 4.6 points and 4.3 rebounds per game.

During the NBA All-Star weekend at the America West Arena in Phoenix, Arizona, Ceballos was selected for the 1995 NBA All-Star Game, as a member of the Western Conference All-Star team, but did not participate due to injury; it was his first and only All-Star selection. Meanwhile, Jones was selected for the NBA Rookie Game, as a member of the Green team; Jones scored 25 points along with 4 assists and 6 steals, and was named the Rookie Game's Most Valuable Player, despite the Green team losing to the White team in overtime, 83–79. In addition, second-year forward Antonio Harvey participated in the NBA Slam Dunk Contest. Ceballos also finished in 15th place in Most Valuable Player voting, while Jones finished in fourth place in Rookie of the Year voting, and Ceballos, Van Exel and Divac all finished tied in ninth place in Most Improved Player voting.

The Lakers finished 23rd in the NBA in home-game attendance, with an attendance of 591,125 at the Great Western Forum during the regular season, which was the fifth-lowest in the league.

=== NBA playoffs ===
In the Western Conference First Round of the 1995 NBA playoffs, the Lakers faced off against the 4th–seeded Seattle SuperSonics, who were led by the All-Star trio of Gary Payton, Shawn Kemp and Detlef Schrempf. The Lakers lost Game 1 to the SuperSonics on the road, 96–71 at the Tacoma Dome, only shooting .354 in field-goal percentage. However, the Lakers managed to win the next three games, which included a Game 4 win over the SuperSonics at home, 114–110 at the Great Western Forum to win the series in four games.

In the Western Conference Semi-finals, the team faced off against the top–seeded, and Midwest Division champion San Antonio Spurs, who were led by the trio of All-Star center, and Most Valuable Player of the Year, David Robinson, Sean Elliott, and rebound-specialist Dennis Rodman. The Spurs took a 3–1 series lead before the Lakers won Game 5 on the road in overtime, 98–96 at the Alamodome. However, the Lakers lost Game 6 to the Spurs at the Great Western Forum, 100–88, thus losing the series in six games.

=== Aftermath ===
Following the season, Bowie retired, while Kurt Rambis was released to free agency, Smith signed as a free agent with the Phoenix Suns, and Harvey was left unprotected in the 1995 NBA expansion draft, where he was selected by the Vancouver Grizzlies expansion team.

== Draft picks ==
Round	Pick	Player	Position	Nationality	College / Team
1	10	Eddie Jones	SG	United States	Temple

== Roster ==
1994–95 Los Angeles Lakers roster
Players

Pos.	No.	Player	Height	Weight	DOB	From
C	31	Sam Bowie	7 ft 1 in (2.16 m)	235 lb (107 kg)	1961–03–17	Kentucky
F	41	Elden Campbell	6 ft 11 in (2.11 m)	215 lb (98 kg)	1968–07–23	Clemson
F	23	Cedric Ceballos	6 ft 6 in (1.98 m)	190 lb (86 kg)	1969–08–02	Cal State Fullerton
G	7	Lester Conner	6 ft 4 in (1.93 m)	180 lb (82 kg)	1959–09–17	Oregon State
C	12	Vlade Divac	7 ft 1 in (2.16 m)	243 lb (110 kg)	1968–02–03	Yugoslavia
F	40	Antonio Harvey	6 ft 11 in (2.11 m)	225 lb (102 kg)	1970–07–06	Pfeiffer
G	25	Eddie Jones	6 ft 6 in (1.98 m)	190 lb (86 kg)	1971–10–20	Temple
F	8	Randolph Keys (injured)	6 ft 7 in (2.01 m)	195 lb (88 kg)	1966–04–19	Southern Miss
F	30	George Lynch	6 ft 8 in (2.03 m)	218 lb (99 kg)	1970–09–03	North Carolina
F	2	Anthony Miller	6 ft 9 in (2.06 m)	225 lb (102 kg)	1971–10–22	Michigan State
G	1	Anthony Peeler	6 ft 4 in (1.93 m)	208 lb (94 kg)	1969–11–25	Missouri
F	18	Kurt Rambis (injured)	6 ft 8 in (2.03 m)	213 lb (97 kg)	1958–02–25	Santa Clara
G	34	Tony Smith	6 ft 3 in (1.91 m)	185 lb (84 kg)	1968–06–14	Marquette
G	3	Sedale Threatt	6 ft 2 in (1.88 m)	175 lb (79 kg)	1961–09–10	West Virginia Tech
G	9	Nick Van Exel	6 ft 1 in (1.85 m)	170 lb (77 kg)	1971–11–27	Cincinnati

Coaches
Head coach
- Del Harris
Assistant(s)
- Bill Bertka
- Michael Cooper
- Larry Drew

Legend
- (DP) Unsigned draft pick
- (FA) Free agent
- (S) Suspended
- Injured

== Regular season ==
=== Season standings ===
Pacific Division	W	L	PCT	GB	Home	Road	Div
y-Phoenix Suns	59	23	.720	—	32–9	27–14	23–7
x-Seattle SuperSonics	57	25	.695	2	32–9	25–16	16–14
x-Los Angeles Lakers	48	34	.585	11	29–12	19–22	15–15
x-Portland Trail Blazers	44	38	.537	15	26–15	18–23	17–13
Sacramento Kings	39	43	.476	20	27–14	12–29	17–13
Golden State Warriors	26	56	.317	33	15–26	11–30	11–19
Los Angeles Clippers	17	65	.207	42	13–28	4–37	6–24

#	Western Conference				
#	Team	W	L	PCT	GB
1	z-San Antonio Spurs	62	20	.756	–
2	y-Phoenix Suns	59	23	.720	3
3	x-Utah Jazz	60	22	.732	2
4	x-Seattle SuperSonics	57	25	.695	5
5	x-Los Angeles Lakers	48	34	.585	14
6	x-Houston Rockets	47	35	.573	15
7	x-Portland Trail Blazers	44	38	.537	18
8	x-Denver Nuggets	41	41	.500	21
9	Sacramento Kings	39	43	.476	23
10	Dallas Mavericks	36	46	.439	26
11	Golden State Warriors	26	56	.317	36
12	Minnesota Timberwolves	21	61	.256	41
13	Los Angeles Clippers	17	65	.207	45

z - clinched division title
y - clinched division title
x - clinched playoff spot

== Game log ==
=== Regular season ===
1994–95 game log
Total: 48–34 (home: 29–12; road: 19–22)
November: 8–6 (home: 2–2; road: 6–4)

Game	Date	Team	Score	High points	High rebounds	High assists	Location Attendance	Record
1	November 4	@ Detroit	W 115-98	Nick Van Exel (35)	Cedric Ceballos (14)	Sedale Threatt (6)	The Palace of Auburn Hills; 21,454	1–0
2	November 5	@ Milwaukee	L 96-97	Cedric Ceballos (20)	Cedric Ceballos (8)	Vlade Divac (6)	Bradley Center; 18,633	1-1
3	November 8	@ New York	L 113-117	Nick Van Exel (26)	Cedric Ceballos (14)	Nick Van Exel (7)	Madison Square Garden; 19,763	1–2
4	November 9	@ Minnesota	W 122-99	Eddie Jones (31)	Elden Campbell (9)	Sedale Threatt (8)	Target Center; 15,892	2-2
5	November 11	Denver	L 117-124 (OT)	Nick Van Exel (21)	Eddie Jones (9)	Nick Van Exel (11)	Great Western Forum; 16,950	2–3
6	November 12	@ Golden State	L 99-121	Cedric Ceballos (20)	Vlade Divac (10)	Nick Van Exel (10)	Oakland–Alameda County Coliseum Arena; 15,025	2–4
15	November 15	@ L.A. Clippers	W 102-92	Ceballos & Divac (24)	Vlade Divac (14)	Nick Van Exel (8)	Los Angeles Memorial Sports Arena; 8,807	3–4
8	November 16	New York	L 89-110	Cedric Ceballos (19)	Cedric Ceballos (12)	Nick Van Exel (5)	Great Western Forum; 13,630	3–5
9	November 18	Cleveland	W 82-80	Nick Van Exel (22)	Cedric Ceballos (9)	Nick Van Exel (10)	Great Western Forum; 10,177	4–5
10	November 23	Dallas	W 118-106	Vlade Divac (27)	Cedric Ceballos (8)	Nick Van Exel (8)	Great Western Forum; 11,124	5-5
11	November 25	@ Atlanta	W 92-87	Vlade Divac (15)	Vlade Divac (16)	Vlade Divac (6)	Omni Coliseum; 14,239	6–5
12	November 26	@ Washington	W 112-96	Nick Van Exel (22)	Cedric Ceballos (14)	Nick Van Exel (13)	USAir Arena; 18,756	7–5
13	November 29	@ New Jersey	W 129-120 (2OT)	Cedric Ceballos (34)	Elden Campbell (12)	Nick Van Exel (13)	Brendan Byrne Arena; 12,211	8–5
14	November 30	@ Cleveland	L 79-117	Vlade Divac (14)	Vlade Divac (8)	Nick Van Exel (4)	Gund Arena; 19,014	8–6

December: 9–3 (home: 5–1; road: 4–2)

Game	Date	Team	Score	High points	High rebounds	High assists	Location Attendance	Record
15	December 2	Houston	W 107–89	Cedric Ceballos (25)	Cedric Ceballos (16)	Vlade Divac (8)	Great Western Forum; 13,056	9–6
16	December 6	Golden State	W 113-101	Cedric Ceballos (28)	Vlade Divac (14)	Nick Van Exel (14)	Great Western Forum; 10,579	10–6
17	December 9	L.A. Clippers	L 84-109	Cedric Ceballos (23)	Vlade Divac (17)	Nick Van Exel (6)	Great Western Forum; 10,768	10–7
18	December 10	@ Utah	W 120-113	Sedale Threatt (38)	Vlade Divac (13)	Sedale Threatt (8)	Delta Center; 19,911	11–7
19	December 13	@ Dallas	W 115-108	Nick Van Exel (35)	Cedric Ceballos (10)	Nick Van Exel (10)	Reunion Arena; 15,150	12–7
20	December 15	@ Houston	W 97–94	Cedric Ceballos (36)	Vlade Divac (11)	Nick Van Exel (7)	The Summit; 11,943	13–7
21	December 17	@ San Antonio	L 102-116	Nick Van Exel (19)	Elden Campbell (11)	Nick Van Exel (6)	Alamodome; 16,439	13–8
22	December 20	Minnesota	W 108-95	Cedric Ceballos (50)	Cedric Ceballos (9)	Nick Van Exel (13)	Great Western Forum; 11,101	14–8
23	December 23	Sacramento	W 100-89	Eddie Jones (27)	Vlade Divac (10)	Nick Van Exel (6)	Great Western Forum; 12,637	15–8
24	December 27	@ Golden State	L 105-129	Cedric Ceballos (24)	Cedric Ceballos (11)	Nick Van Exel (11)	Oakland–Alameda County Coliseum Arena; 15,025	15–9
25	December 29	Seattle	W 96-95	Cedric Ceballos (35)	Campbell & Ceballos (10)	Nick Van Exel (7)	Great Western Forum; 17,505	16–9
26	December 30	@ Phoenix	W 127-112	Cedric Ceballos (37)	Elden Campbell (12)	Nick Van Exel (16)	American West Arena; 19,023	17–9

January: 9–5 (home: 6–2; road: 3–3)

Game	Date	Team	Score	High points	High rebounds	High assists	Location Attendance	Record
27	January 3	Detroit	W 105-96	Vlade Divac (23)	Ceballos & Divac (10)	Nick Van Exel (9)	Great Western Forum; 13,228	18–9
28	January 6	Milwaukee	W 106-98	Eddie Jones (26)	Sam Bowie (10)	Vlade Divac (6)	Great Western Forum; 13,227	19–9
29	January 8	Miami	W 122-105	Anthony Peeler (23)	Vlade Divac (11)	Divac & Van Exel (10)	Great Western Forum; 12,997	20–9
30	January 9	@ Portland	L 83-129	Tony Smith (19)	George Lynch (7)	Sam Bowie (5)	Memorial Coliseum; 12,888	20–10
31	January 11	Phoenix	L 108-118	Nick Van Exel (35)	Sam Bowie (9)	Nick Van Exel (7)	Great Western Forum; 17,505	20–11
32	January 13	Golden State	W 115-104	Ceballos & Van Exel (24)	Vlade Divac (12)	Nick Van Exel (14)	Great Western Forum; 13,182	21–11
33	January 16	L.A. Clippers	W 96-88	Nick Van Exel (24)	Cedric Ceballos (13)	Nick Van Exel (6)	Great Western Forum; 11,326	22–11
34	January 18	@ Indiana	L 105-106	Nick Van Exel (30)	George Lynch (8)	Nick Van Exel (10)	Market Square Arena; 14,061	22–12
35	January 20	@ Boston	W 120-118	Cedric Ceballos (31)	Elden Campbell (9)	Nick Van Exel (10)	Boston Garden; 14,890	23–12
36	January 21	@ Philadelphia	L 113-117 (OT)	Cedric Ceballos (31)	Cedric Ceballos (11)	Nick Van Exel (9)	CoreStates Spectrum; 14,235	23–13
37	January 23	@ Charlotte	W 108-102	Ceballos & Van Exel (26)	Vlade Divac (15)	Nick Van Exel (9)	Charlotte Coliseum; 23,698	24–13
38	January 25	New Jersey	W 120-116 (OT)	Cedric Ceballos (33)	Vlade Divac (15)	Nick Van Exel (15)	Great Western Forum; 11,140	25–13
39	January 28	@ Seattle	W 128-121 (OT)	Elden Campbell (27)	Vlade Divac (15)	Bowie & Divac (5)	Tacoma Dome; 17,426	26–13
40	January 31	Chicago	L 115-119	Nick Van Exel (27)	Vlade Divac (13)	Nick Van Exel (16)	Great Western Forum; 17,505	26–14

February: 8–5 (home: 5–2; road: 3–3)

Game	Date	Team	Score	High points	High rebounds	High assists	Location Attendance	Record
41	February 1	@ Phoenix	L 109-118	Eddie Jones (26)	Vlade Divac (14)	Nick Van Exel (10)	American West Arena; 19,023	26–15
42	February 3	Denver	L 74-88	Vlade Divac (27)	Vlade Divac (15)	Nick Van Exel (6)	Great Western Forum; 14,493	26–16
43	February 4	@ L.A. Clippers	W 121-118	Eddie Jones (30)	4 players tied (5)	Nick Van Exel (7)	Los Angeles Memorial Sports Arena; 16,021	27–16
44	February 7	@ Denver	W 85-83	Eddie Jones (20)	Vlade Divac (13)	Nick Van Exel (4)	McNichols Sports Arena; 17,171	28–16
45	February 8	San Antonio	W 115-99	Anthony Peeler (26)	Vlade Divac (15)	Nick Van Exel (10)	Great Western Forum; 14,175	29–16
All-Star Break
46	February 15	Seattle	W 102-96	Jones & Van Exel (19)	Vlade Divac (11)	Nick Van Exel (9)	Great Western Forum; 14,936	30–16
47	February 16	@ Sacramento	L 82-98	Eddie Jones (18)	Eddie Jones (10)	Vlade Divac (6)	ARCO Arena; 17,317	30–17
48	February 19	Portland	W 93-83	Anthony Peeler (21)	Vlade Divac (16)	Nick Van Exel (13)	Great Western Forum; 17,505	31–17
49	February 20	@ Seattle	W 108-105	Nick Van Exel (40)	Nick Van Exel (7)	Vlade Divac (8)	Tacoma Dome; 16,502	32–17
50	February 22	Philadelphia	W 112-100	Anthony Peeler (21)	Vlade Divac (12)	Divac & Threatt (8)	Great Western Forum; 12,524	33–17
51	February 24	Charlotte	W 95-93 (OT)	Anthony Peeler (27)	Vlade Divac (24)	Vlade Divac (8)	Great Western Forum; 17,505	34–17
52	February 25	@ L.A. Clippers	L 81-83	Vlade Divac (20)	Vlade Divac (20)	Nick Van Exel (6)	Los Angeles Memorial Sports Arena; 16,021	34–18
53	February 27	Utah	L 95-101	Elden Campbell (25)	Vlade Divac (11)	Vlade Divac (8)	Great Western Forum; 14,230	34–19

March: 10–7 (home: 8–2; road: 2–5)

Game	Date	Team	Score	High points	High rebounds	High assists	Location Attendance	Record
54	March 1	Phoenix	L 93-101	Anthony Peeler (25)	Vlade Divac (15)	Nick Van Exel (10)	Great Western Forum; 17,505	34–20
55	March 3	Sacramento	W 109-104 (2OT)	Vlade Divac (27)	Vlade Divac (19)	Nick Van Exel (11)	Great Western Forum; 12,040	35–20
56	March 5	Minnesota	W 105-102	Vlade Divac (30)	Vlade Divac (14)	Nick Van Exel (17)	Great Western Forum; 11,943	36–20
57	March 7	@ Miami	L 104-110	Divac & Peeler (23)	Anthony Miller (13)	Divac & Van Exel (7)	Miami Arena; 14,452	36–21
58	March 8	@ Orlando	L 110-114	Anthony Peeler (26)	Vlade Divac (15)	Nick Van Exel (10)	Orlando Arena; 16,010	36–22
59	March 10	@ Minnesota	L 103-109	Sedale Threatt (26)	Vlade Divac (9)	Sam Bowie (8)	Target Center; 17,891	36–23
60	March 11	@ Chicago	W 108-105	Anthony Peeler (22)	Vlade Divac (14)	Divac & Threatt (7)	United Center; 22,404	37–23
61	March 13	Indiana	W 93-91	Lloyd Daniels (22)	Anthony Miller (11)	Sedale Threatt (9)	Great Western Forum; 12,764	38–23
62	March 15	@ Golden State	L 108-119	Vlade Divac (27)	Vlade Divac (14)	Nick Van Exel (12)	Oakland–Alameda County Coliseum Arena; 15,025	38–24
63	March 17	Boston	L 92-118	Divac & Threatt (14)	Vlade Divac (5)	Sedale Threatt (9)	Great Western Forum; 15,087	38–25
64	March 19	Sacramento	W 121-116	Nick Van Exel (35)	Sam Bowie (11)	Nick Van Exel (8)	Great Western Forum; 13,219	39–25
65	March 22	Portland	W 121-114	Elden Campbell (32)	Elden Campbell (11)	Nick Van Exel (10)	Great Western Forum; 12,123	40–25
66	March 24	Washington	W 113-103	Vlade Divac (25)	Vlade Divac (20)	Nick Van Exel (12)	Great Western Forum; 14,144	41–25
67	March 26	Houston	W 107–96	Vlade Divac (27)	Elden Campbell (12)	Nick Van Exel (9)	Great Western Forum; 17,505	42–25
68	March 28	@ Houston	W 106–96	Campbell & Ceballos (17)	Campbell & Miller (13)	Nick Van Exel (9)	The Summit; 16,611	43–25
69	March 29	@ San Antonio	L 84-107	Cedric Ceballos (17)	Vlade Divac (14)	Nick Van Exel (7)	Alamodome; 18,027	43–26
70	March 31	Atlanta	W 121-107	Cedric Ceballos (25)	Vlade Divac (13)	Nick Van Exel (8)	Great Western Forum; 16,760	44–26

April: 4–8 (home: 3–3; road: 1–5)

Game	Date	Team	Score	High points	High rebounds	High assists	Location Attendance	Record
71	April 2	Orlando	W 119-112	Cedric Ceballos (33)	Cedric Ceballos (8)	Nick Van Exel (9)	Great Western Forum; 17,505	45–26
72	April 4	@ Denver	W 104-101	Jones & Van Exel (19)	Cedric Ceballos (8)	Eddie Jones (5)	McNichols Sports Arena; 17,171	46–26
73	April 5	@ Dallas	L 111-130	Nick Van Exel (24)	Vlade Divac (10)	Elden Campbell (5)	Reunion Arena; 17,502	46–27
74	April 7	Utah	W 113-90	Cedric Ceballos (36)	Cedric Ceballos (11)	Nick Van Exel (8)	Great Western Forum; 17,505	47–27
75	April 9	San Antonio	L 87-101	Cedric Ceballos (26)	Vlade Divac (17)	Vlade Divac (7)	Great Western Forum; 17,505	47–28
76	April 11	@ Utah	L 93-100	Eddie Jones (23)	Elden Campbell (11)	Tony Smith (5)	Delta Center; 19,911	47–29
77	April 12	@ Sacramento	L 99-109	Vlade Divac (24)	Vlade Divac (15)	Nick Van Exel (9)	ARCO Arena; 17,317	47–30
78	April 15	@ Phoenix	L 114-119	Cedric Ceballos (40)	Elden Campbell (15)	Nick Van Exel (15)	American West Arena; 19,023	47–31
79	April 16	Dallas	W 125-111	Cedric Ceballos (33)	Vlade Divac (13)	Nick Van Exel (14)	Great Western Forum; 17,505	48–31
80	April 18	Seattle	L 97-113	Anthony Peeler (18)	Anthony Miller (9)	Tony Smith (7)	Great Western Forum; 17,505	48–32
81	April 20	@ Portland	L 97-111	Cedric Ceballos (36)	Sam Bowie (15)	Nick Van Exel (7)	Memorial Coliseum; 12,888	48–33
82	April 22	Portland	L 104-109	Anthony Peeler (22)	Elden Campbell (7)	Nick Van Exel (7)	Great Western Forum; 17,505	48–34

1994–95 schedule

=== Playoffs ===
1995 playoff game log
Total: 5–5 (home: 3–2; road: 2–3)
First round: 3–1 (home: 2–0; road: 1–1)

Game	Date	Team	Score	High points	High rebounds	High assists	Location Attendance	Series
1	April 27	@ Seattle	L 71–96	Nick Van Exel (29)	Campbell & Divac (6)	4 players tied (2)	Tacoma Dome; 14,073	0–1
2	April 29	@ Seattle	W 84–82	Cedric Ceballos (25)	Vlade Divac (7)	Vlade Divac (6)	Tacoma Dome; 14,681	1–1
3	May 1	Seattle	W 105–101	Cedric Ceballos (24)	Vlade Divac (9)	Ceballos & Van Exel (6)	Great Western Forum; 17,505	2–1
4	May 4	Seattle	W 114–110	Nick Van Exel (34)	Vlade Divac (11)	Nick Van Exel (9)	Great Western Forum; 17,505	3–1

Conference semifinals: 2–4 (home: 1–2; road: 1–2)

Game	Date	Team	Score	High points	High rebounds	High assists	Location Attendance	Series
1	May 6	@ San Antonio	L 94–110	Elden Campbell (29)	Vlade Divac (11)	Nick Van Exel (12)	Alamodome; 24,002	0–1
2	May 8	@ San Antonio	L 90–97 (OT)	Elden Campbell (25)	Elden Campbell (18)	Nick Van Exel (10)	Alamodome; 26,127	0–2
3	May 12	San Antonio	W 92–85	Nick Van Exel (25)	Vlade Divac (13)	Nick Van Exel (8)	Great Western Forum; 17,505	1–2
4	May 14	San Antonio	L 71–80	Vlade Divac (14)	George Lynch (8)	Peeler & Van Exel (5)	Great Western Forum; 17,505	1–3
5	May 16	@ San Antonio	W 98–96 (OT)	Nick Van Exel (22)	Vlade Divac (15)	Nick Van Exel (7)	Alamodome; 35,888	2–3
6	May 18	San Antonio	L 88–100	Elden Campbell (21)	Elden Campbell (8)	Nick Van Exel (11)	Great Western Forum; 17,505	2–4

1995 schedule

== Player statistics ==
Legend
GP	Games played	GS	Games started	MPG	Minutes per game
FG%	Field-goal percentage	3P%	3-point field-goal percentage	FT%	Free-throw percentage
RPG	Rebounds per game	APG	Assists per game	SPG	Steals per game
BPG	Blocks per game	PPG	Points per game

=== Season ===
Player	GP	GS	MPG	FG%	3FG%	FT%	RPG	APG	SPG	BPG	PPG
Sam Bowie	67	10	18.3	.442	.182	.764	4.3	1.8	.3	1.2	4.6
Elden Campbell	73	59	28.4	.459	.000	.666	6.1	1.3	.9	1.8	12.5
Cedric Ceballos	58	54	35.0	.509	.397	.716	8.0	1.8	1.0	.3	21.7
Lester Conner	2	0	2.5	.000	.000	1.000	.0	.0	.5	.0	1.0
Lloyd Daniels^{1}	25	14	21.6	.390	.267	.800	2.2	1.4	.8	.4	7.4
Vlade Divac	80	80	35.1	.507	.189	.777	10.4	4.1	1.4	2.2	16.0
Antonio Harvey	59	8	9.7	.438	1.000	.533	1.7	.4	.3	.7	3.0
Eddie Jones	64	58	31.0	.460	.370	.722	3.9	2.0	2.0	.6	14.0
Randolph Keys	6	0	13.8	.346	.000	1.000	2.8	.3	.2	.3	3.3
George Lynch	56	15	17.0	.468	.143	.721	3.3	1.1	.9	.2	6.1
Anthony Miller	46	1	11.5	.530	.400	.618	3.3	.8	.4	.2	4.1
Anthony Peeler	73	24	21.4	.432	.389	.797	2.3	1.7	.7	.2	10.4
Kurt Rambis	26	1	7.5	.514	.000	.667	1.3	.6	.1	.3	1.7
Tony Smith	61	4	16.8	.427	.352	.698	1.8	1.7	.8	.1	5.6
Sedale Threatt	59	2	23.5	.497	.379	.793	2.1	4.2	.9	.2	9.5
Nick Van Exel	80	80	36.8	.420	.358	.783	2.8	8.3	1.2	.1	16.9

1. Statistics with the Lakers.

=== Playoffs ===
Player	GP	GS	MPG	FG%	3FG%	FT%	RPG	APG	SPG	BPG	PPG
Sam Bowie	10	0	13.5	.267	.000	1.000	3.3	.3	.1	.9	2.1
Elden Campbell	10	10	37.6	.485	.000	.659	7.3	1.6	.4	3.0	15.7
Cedric Ceballos	10	10	34.0	.381	.360	.737	6.1	1.8	1.2	.7	14.2
Vlade Divac	10	10	38.8	.467	.222	.645	8.5	3.1	.8	1.3	15.6
Antonio Harvey	3	0	1.3	.000	.000	.000	.3	.0	.0	.0	.0
Eddie Jones	10	0	28.6	.375	.444	.714	3.2	2.0	.8	.9	8.7
George Lynch	10	0	13.6	.469	.200	.650	3.0	.7	.8	.0	4.4
Anthony Miller	4	0	3.8	.000	.000	.000	1.5	.3	.3	.0	.0
Anthony Peeler	10	10	26.8	.405	.258	.773	2.8	2.5	1.0	.2	8.9
Tony Smith	6	0	4.5	.231	.300	.000	.5	.5	.0	.0	1.5
Sedale Threatt	1	0	11.0	.250	.000	.000	.0	2.0	1.0	.0	2.0
Nick Van Exel	10	10	46.4	.414	.318	.763	3.8	7.3	2.1	.3	20.0

Player statistics citation:

== Awards and records ==
=== Awards ===
All-NBA Rookie Teams

- Eddie Jones – All-NBA Rookie First Team

1995 NBA All-Star Game

- Cedric Ceballos (first participation)

== Transactions ==
=== Trades ===
July 1, 1994	To Los Angeles Lakers Anthony Miller	To Golden State Warriors 1995 second-round pick

September 23, 1994	To Los Angeles Lakers Cedric Ceballos	To Phoenix Suns 1995 first-round pick

October 13, 1994	To Los Angeles Lakers 1997 second-round pick Cash considerations	To New York Knicks Doug Christie

=== Free agents ===
Additions
Player	Date signed	Former team
Trevor Ruffin	July 21	none
Lester Conner (10-day)	January 10	Indiana Pacers
Danny Young (10-day)	January 20	Milwaukee Bucks
Lloyd Daniels (10-day)	February 22	Limoges CSP (France)
Randolph Keys (10-day)	February 28	Quad City Thunder (CBA)
Randolph Keys (rest of season)	March 14	Los Angeles Lakers
Lloyd Daniels (rest of season)	March 14	Los Angeles Lakers

Subtractions
Player	Date signed	New Team
Danny Schayes	July 1	Phoenix Suns
James Edwards	September 19	Portland Trail Blazers
Trevor Ruffin	November 3	Phoenix Suns
James Worthy	November 10	none
Lloyd Daniels	April 11	Fort Wayne Fury (CBA)

Player Transactions Citation:
