= Danny Schayes =

American professional basketball player (born 1959)

Personal information
- Born: May 10, 1959 (age 67) Syracuse, New York, U.S.
- Listed height: 6 ft 11 in (2.11 m)
- Listed weight: 260 lb (118 kg)

Career information
- High school: Jamesville-DeWitt (DeWitt, New York)
- College: Syracuse (1977–1981)
- NBA draft: 1981: 1st round, 13th overall pick
- Drafted by: Utah Jazz
- Playing career: 1981–1999
- Position: Center / power forward
- Number: 24, 34, 10, 26

Career history
- 1981–1983: Utah Jazz
- 1983–1990: Denver Nuggets
- 1990–1994: Milwaukee Bucks
- 1994: Los Angeles Lakers
- 1994–1995: Phoenix Suns
- 1995–1996: Miami Heat
- 1996–1999: Orlando Magic

Career highlights
- First-team All-Big East (1981)

Career NBA statistics
- Points: 8,780 (7.7 ppg)
- Rebounds: 5,671 (5.0 rpg)
- Blocks/Assists: 840 (0.7 bpg)/1299 (1.1 apg)
- Stats at NBA.com
- Stats at Basketball Reference

Daniel Leslie Schayes (born May 10, 1959) is an American former professional basketball player who played for Syracuse University and played 18 seasons in the National Basketball Association (NBA), from 1981 until 1999. At 6'11" and 235 pounds, he played both the center and power forward positions. He is the son of the late Dolph Schayes, who was selected for the Naismith Memorial Basketball Hall of Fame. Since his retirement from the NBA, Schayes has served as co-host of Centers of Attention, a sports talk show on ESPN Radio Syracuse in Syracuse, New York. His co-host is Etan Thomas, also a retired American professional basketball player.

== Early life ==
Schayes was born into a Jewish family in Syracuse, New York, the son of Naomi Eva (née Gross) and Dolph Schayes, who played professional basketball and was inducted in the Hall of Fame. His father's parents were born in Romania, and immigrated to the United States.

Schayes grew up in DeWitt, New York. He is an alum of Jamesville-Dewitt High School, where he scored 1,012 points for the basketball team. The team won the Onondaga League North title in 1977.

Schayes played on the US basketball team that won a gold medal at the 1977 Maccabiah Games in Tel Aviv, Israel; he also played for Team USA at the 1981 Maccabiah Games, which won a gold medal. He served as Head Coach of Team USA in basketball at the 2013 Maccabiah Games, which won another gold medal.

== College ==
During his senior year at Syracuse University, the first year in which he started for the team, Schayes averaged nearly 14.6 points and 8.3 rebounds a game, and compiled 284 rebounds. He was named to the 1981 All-Big East first team and was both an All-American and an Academic All-American. He holds the record at the Carrier Dome for rebounds in a game (23).

== Professional career ==
He was selected in the first round with the 13th overall pick by the Utah Jazz in the 1981 NBA draft out of Syracuse University. Schayes was the second center to be drafted that year, with Steve Johnson of Oregon State being the first.

After spending two seasons with the Jazz, he played for several different teams, notably with the Denver Nuggets, in which he spent his best years. The highlight of his NBA career was his performance in the 1987–88 season with the Nuggets when he averaged 13.9 points and 8.2 rebounds per game. In the playoffs that season he averaged 16.4 points and 7.2 rebounds per game. He was 4th in the NBA with a .640 true shooting percentage.

He retired after the NBA lockout-shortened 1999 season, after averaging 1.5 points in an injury-plagued 19-game stint with the Orlando Magic. Schayes was briefly a member of the Minnesota Timberwolves after signing as a free agent before the start of the 1999–00 season. However, he made no appearances for them due to his injuries, and was waived. He had an 18-year career in the NBA, in which he averaged 7.7 points and 5.0 rebounds in 1,138 games.

== NBA career statistics ==
Legend
GP	Games played	GS	Games started	MPG	Minutes per game
FG%	Field goal percentage	3P%	3-point field goal percentage	FT%	Free throw percentage
RPG	Rebounds per game	APG	Assists per game	SPG	Steals per game
BPG	Blocks per game	PPG	Points per game	**Bold**	Career high

=== Regular season ===
Year	Team	GP	GS	MPG	FG%	3P%	FT%	RPG	APG	SPG	BPG	PPG
1981-82	Utah	**82**	20	19.8	.481	.000	.757	5.2	1.8	0.6	0.9	7.9
1982-83	Utah	50	50	**32.8**	.449	.000	.805	**9.0**	**3.3**	**0.8**	**1.4**	12.4
1982-83	Denver	32	0	20.2	.472	.000	.710	5.8	1.3	0.5	0.9	9.2
1983-84	Denver	**82**	15	17.3	.493	.000	.790	5.3	1.1	0.4	0.7	7.1
1984-85	Denver	56	0	9.7	.465	.000	.814	2.6	0.7	0.4	0.4	3.6
1985-86	Denver	80	13	20.7	.502	.000	.777	5.5	1.0	0.5	0.8	8.2
1986-87	Denver	76	41	20.5	.519	.000	.779	5.0	1.1	0.3	1.0	8.5
1987-88	Denver	81	74	26.7	**.540**	.000	.836	8.2	1.3	0.8	1.1	**13.9**
1988-89	Denver	76	**64**	25.2	.522	.333	.826	6.6	1.4	0.6	1.1	12.8
1989-90	Denver	53	22	22.5	.494	.000	.852	6.5	1.2	0.8	0.8	10.4
1990-91	Milwaukee	**82**	38	27.2	.499	.000	.835	6.5	1.2	0.7	0.7	10.8
1991-92	Milwaukee	43	4	16.9	.417	.000	.771	3.9	0.8	0.4	0.4	5.6
1992-93	Milwaukee	70	7	16.1	.399	.000	.818	3.6	1.1	0.5	0.5	4.6
1993-94	Milwaukee	23	6	10.0	.304	.000	**.955**	2.0	0.2	0.2	0.3	2.1
1993-94	L.A. Lakers	13	0	10.2	.368	.000	.800	2.6	0.6	0.4	0.2	2.8
1994-95	Phoenix	69	27	11.9	.508	**1.000**	.725	3.0	1.3	0.3	0.5	4.4
1995-96	Miami	32	6	12.5	.340	.000	.804	2.8	0.3	0.3	0.5	3.2
1996-97	Orlando	45	6	12.0	.392	.000	.750	2.8	0.3	0.3	0.4	3.0
1997-98	Orlando	74	33	17.2	.418	.000	.807	3.3	0.6	0.5	0.4	5.5
1998-99	Orlando	19	1	7.5	.379	.000	.750	0.7	0.2	0.1	0.1	1.5
Career		1138	427	19.3	.481	.133	.806	5.0	1.1	0.5	0.7	7.7

=== Playoffs ===
Year	Team	GP	GS	MPG	FG%	3P%	FT%	RPG	APG	SPG	BPG	PPG
1983	Denver	8	0	20.4	.488	.000	**.1000**	5.0	**1.8**	0.3	0.6	7.1
1984	Denver	5	0	16.2	.611	.000	.750	4.8	0.8	0.8	0.6	5.6
1985	Denver	9	0	13.1	.423	.000	.700	3.3	1.3	0.3	0.3	4.0
1986	Denver	10	6	29.5	.535	.000	.800	**8.2**	0.9	0.4	**1.7**	11.6
1987	Denver	3	0	25.0	**.706**	.000	.667	5.7	0.7	0.3	0.7	10.0
1988	Denver	**11**	**11**	28.5	.625	.000	.843	7.2	1.6	0.3	0.9	**16.4**
1989	Denver	2	0	18.0	.143	.000	.750	5.5	0.5	0.5	0.5	4.0
1991	Milwaukee	3	3	23.7	.391	.000	.909	4.0	1.0	**1.0**	0.3	9.3
1995	Phoenix	10	0	14.6	.379	.000	.875	2.0	0.8	0.3	0.3	2.9
1996	Miami	2	0	8.5	.750	.000	.500	2.0	0.0	0.0	0.0	3.5
1997	Orlando	5	2	18.4	.391	.000	.500	2.4	1.0	0.4	0.2	4.4
1999	Orlando	1	0	8.0	.000	.000	.000	0.0	0.0	0.0	0.0	0.0
Career		69	22	20.5	.518	.000	.823	4.8	1.1	0.4	0.7	7.8

== Halls of Fame and awards ==
In 1989, he was inducted into the Jamesville-Dewitt High School athletic Hall of Fame. and the school retired his jersey number. Schayes was named "Best male athlete to hail from CNY" by the Post Standard in 2000. He was also added to the Syracuse University All-Century Basketball team and Hall of Fame. Schayes is also a member of the New York Jewish Sports Hall of Fame.

== Personal life ==
Schayes is married to Wendy Lucero-Schayes, a former Olympic diver. He formerly ran No Limits Investing in Phoenix, Arizona, where he now lives, and is currently Senior Industry Specialist, Sports and Entertainment, for AI-based technology company Endava.

Schayes was part of a promotional campaign put on by the Anti-Defamation League that depicts him slam dunking and says, "If you believe in America, prejudice is foul play!"

While attending Syracuse University, Schayes co-founded the United Students Financial Board, which gathered more than 200 members in its inaugural year.

== See also ==
- List of NBA career personal fouls leaders
- List of select Jewish basketball players
- List of oldest and youngest NBA players
