= Aaron Swinson =

American basketball player (born 1971)

Personal information
- Born: January 9, 1971 (age 55) Brunswick, Georgia, U.S.
- Listed height: 6 ft 5 in (1.96 m)
- Listed weight: 230 lb (104 kg)

Career information
- High school: Brunswick (Brunswick, Georgia)
- College: Auburn (1990–1994)
- NBA draft: 1994: undrafted
- Playing career: 1994–2005
- Position: Small forward
- Number: 4

Career history
- 1994: Phoenix Suns
- 1994–1995: Yakima Sun Kings
- 1995–1996: Montecatini
- 1996–1998: Valencia BC
- 1998–1999: Joventut Badalona
- 1999–2000: Pau-Orthez
- 2000: Libertad de Sunchales
- 2000–2001: Club Ourense Baloncesto
- 2002: Roseto Sharks
- 2002–2004: CB Ciudad de Algeciras
- 2004–2005: CB Los Barrios

Career highlights
- CBA champion (1995); CBA Playoff/Finals MVP (1995); CBA All-Rookie First Team (1995); Second-team All-SEC (1994)
- Stats at NBA.com
- Stats at Basketball Reference

Aaron Anthony Swinson (born January 9, 1971) is an American former professional basketball player. A 6-foot-5-inch (1.96 m) small forward, Swinson played college basketball for the Auburn Tigers.

In 1994-95, Swinson played in nine games for the Phoenix Suns of the National Basketball Association (NBA).

Swinson played for the Yakima Sun Kings of the Continental Basketball Association (CBA) during the 1994–95 season when they won the 1995 CBA championship. He was selected as the CBA Playoff/Finals Most Valuable Player and named to the All-Rookie First Team.

== Trophies ==
=== With Yakima Sun Kings ===
- CBA: (1) 1995

=== With Valencia BC ===
- Copa del Rey: (1) 1998
