= Nick Van Exel =

American basketball coach and former player (born 1971)

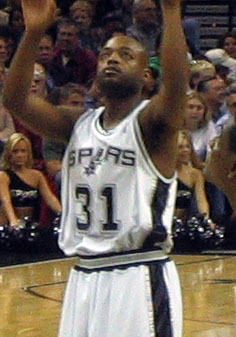
- Van Exel with the San Antonio Spurs in 2005

Personal information
- Born: November 27, 1971 (age 54) Kenosha, Wisconsin, U.S.
- Listed height: 6 ft 1 in (1.85 m)
- Listed weight: 190 lb (86 kg)

Career information
- High school: St. Joseph (Kenosha, Wisconsin)
- College: Trinity Valley CC (1989–1991); Cincinnati (1991–1993)
- NBA draft: 1993: 2nd round, 37th overall pick
- Drafted by: Los Angeles Lakers
- Playing career: 1993–2006
- Position: Point guard / shooting guard
- Number: 9, 31, 37, 19
- Coaching career: 2009–present

Career history

Playing
- 1993–1998: Los Angeles Lakers
- 1998–2002: Denver Nuggets
- 2002–2003: Dallas Mavericks
- 2003–2004: Golden State Warriors
- 2004–2005: Portland Trail Blazers
- 2005–2006: San Antonio Spurs

Career highlights
- NBA All-Star (1998); NBA All-Rookie Second Team (1994); Third-team All-American – AP, NABC (1993); First-team All-Great Midwest (1993)

Career NBA statistics
- Points: 12,658 (14.4 ppg)
- Rebounds: 2,545 (2.9 rpg)
- Assists: 5,777 (6.6 apg)
- Stats at NBA.com
- Stats at Basketball Reference

Nickey Maxwell Van Exel (born November 27, 1971) is an American professional basketball coach and former player who last served as an assistant coach for the Atlanta Hawks of the National Basketball Association (NBA). Van Exel played for six NBA teams from 1993 through 2006. He was an NBA All-Star with the Los Angeles Lakers in 1998.

Van Exel played college basketball for the Cincinnati Bearcats, earning third-team All-American honors as a senior in 1993. He was selected by the Lakers in the second round of the 1993 NBA draft as the 37th overall pick. In his first season, he was named to the NBA All-Rookie Second Team.

== Early life and education ==
Van Exel was raised primarily by his mother, Joyce. He attended St. Joseph High School, a private high school in Kenosha, Wisconsin. He played from 1987 to 1989 and scored 1,282 points, including 772 as a senior. He led the WISAA (private schools) state tournament in scoring as a junior and senior when his team lost in the finals both years. He was named to the Associated Press all-state team as a senior.

== College career ==
Van Exel wanted to play college basketball, but his grades weren't high enough to qualify for a top-flight program, so he went to junior college at Trinity Valley Community College for two years. He applied himself to his studies and qualified to enroll at the University of Cincinnati and play for Bearcats coach Bob Huggins.

Prior to Van Exel's arrival, the Bearcats had gone 18–12. In 1991–92, with Van Exel as starting point guard averaging 12.3 points and 2.9 assists per game, the Bearcats went 29–5, won their league tournament, and won four NCAA tournament games to advance to the NCAA Final Four, where they were defeated by Michigan and their "Fab Five."

In his senior year, Van Exel led Cincinnati with 18.3 points and 4.5 assists per game as the team went 27–5, again won their league tournament, and advanced to the NCAA Elite Eight before falling in overtime to North Carolina. Van Exel earned Third-team All-America honors (AP, Basketball Times and Basketball Weekly) and was a finalist for the Wooden Award for player of the year. In only two seasons, he became Cincinnati's all-time leader in three-point field goals made (147), three-point field goals attempted (411), and three-point field goal percentage (.358) (These records have since been surpassed). Van Exel was inducted into the University of Cincinnati Athletics Hall of Fame in 2018.

Van Exel is the eighth former men's basketball player to graduate with the help of UC's Student-Athlete Support Services department since 2018. He graduated with degrees in interdisciplinary studies in 2023.

== Professional career ==
In a 13-year NBA career, Van Exel played for the San Antonio Spurs, Portland Trail Blazers, Golden State Warriors, Dallas Mavericks, Denver Nuggets and Los Angeles Lakers.

Van Exel's career began when he was selected by the Los Angeles Lakers in the second round as the 37th overall pick of the 1993 NBA draft. Van Exel and Eddie Jones were the centerpiece of the Lakers' rebuilding plan after the end of their successful Showtime Era in the early '90s. Led by Van Exel's flashy play, the two guards helped the team to the playoffs in 1995 after the Lakers had missed the postseason for the first time in years in 1994. Van Exel was known for his shooting streaks, buzzer-beating shots, and speed, earning him the nickname "Nick the Quick".

During his career with the Lakers, Van Exel averaged 14.9 points per game as well as 7.3 assists per game, finishing in the top 10 in the NBA in that category twice. In 1996, during a game against the Denver Nuggets, he pushed a referee, resulting in an ejection, seven-game suspension, and $187,000 fine.

On June 24, 1998, after five seasons as the starting point guard, Van Exel was traded to the Denver Nuggets for Tony Battie and the draft rights to Tyronn Lue; while it was reported at the time that the trade was made at the behest of Shaquille O'Neal because of a Cancún chant Van Exel made in the playoffs, Van Exel stated this was not the case.

Playing on a Nuggets team which was one of the worst in the league, Van Exel achieved several career highs. Over four seasons he put up averages of 17.7 ppg and 8.4 apg, averaging 21.4 ppg through 45 games of the 2001–02 season.

On February 21, 2002, he was traded by the Nuggets along with Raef LaFrentz, Avery Johnson, and Tariq Abdul-Wahad to the Dallas Mavericks for Juwan Howard, Donnell Harvey, Tim Hardaway, and a 2002 first-round pick.

In Dallas, Van Exel played a smaller role but contributed effectively by creating scoring opportunities and scoring key three-pointers. He averaged 12.5 ppg during the 2002–03 season, and nearly 20 ppg in the 2003 playoffs, carrying the offensive load for the Mavericks in a tight series against the Sacramento Kings, scoring 36 and 40 points in back-to-back wins in games 2 and 3.

Van Exel was traded on August 18, 2003, to the Golden State Warriors along with Evan Eschmeyer, Avery Johnson, Popeye Jones, and Antoine Rigaudeau in exchange for Antawn Jamison, Chris Mills, Danny Fortson, and Jiří Welsch. During the 2003–04 season, he played in a career-low 39 games, averaging 12.6 ppg and 5.3 apg.

On July 20, 2004, he was traded by Golden State to the Portland Trail Blazers in exchange for Dale Davis and Dan Dickau. With the Blazers he played in only 53 games, averaging 11 ppg.

Van Exel was waived by Portland on August 3, 2005, and he signed with the San Antonio Spurs on August 29. After signing, Van Exel stated that it would be his last season in an NBA uniform. Due to knee and elbow injuries, he only played in 65 games during the 2005–06 season. He averaged career lows in almost every statistical category, including points (5.5 ppg) and minutes (15 mpg). In the playoffs, San Antonio was eliminated by the Dallas Mavericks in a series that lasted seven games. Two days later, on May 24, 2006, ESPN's Tony Kornheiser and Michael Wilbon reported on their show Pardon the Interruption that Van Exel would soon announce his retirement.

== NBA career statistics ==
Legend
GP	Games played	GS	Games started	MPG	Minutes per game
FG%	Field goal percentage	3P%	3-point field goal percentage	FT%	Free throw percentage
RPG	Rebounds per game	APG	Assists per game	SPG	Steals per game
BPG	Blocks per game	PPG	Points per game	**Bold**	Career high
*	Led the league

=== Regular season ===
Year	Team	GP	GS	MPG	FG%	3P%	FT%	RPG	APG	SPG	BPG	PPG
1993–94	L.A. Lakers	**81**	**80**	33.3	.394	.338	.781	2.9	5.8	1.0	.1	13.6
1994–95	L.A. Lakers	80	**80**	36.8	**.420**	.358	.783	2.8	8.3	**1.2**	.1	16.9
1995–96	L.A. Lakers	74	74	34.0	.417	.357	.799	2.4	6.9	.9	.1	14.9
1996–97	L.A. Lakers	79	79	37.2	.402	.378	.825	2.9	8.5	.9	.1	15.3
1997–98	L.A. Lakers	64	46	32.1	.419	**.389**	.791	3.0	6.9	1.0	.1	13.8
1998–99	Denver	50*	50*	36.0	.398	.308	.811	2.3	7.4	.8	.1	16.5
1999–00	Denver	79	79	37.3	.390	.332	.817	**3.9**	**9.0**	.9	.1	16.1
2000–01	Denver	71	70	28.7	.414	.377	.819	3.4	8.5	.9	**.3**	17.7
2001–02	Denver	45	44	**38.6**	.408	.337	.782	3.8	8.1	.7	.2	**21.4**
2001–02	Dallas	27	2	28.0	.411	.347	**.844**	3.1	4.2	.5	.1	13.2
2002–03	Dallas	73	1	27.8	.412	.378	.764	2.8	4.3	.6	.1	12.5
2003–04	Golden State	39	29	32.2	.390	.307	.707	2.7	5.3	.5	.1	12.6
2004–05	Portland	53	34	30.5	.381	**.389**	.784	3.0	4.3	.8	.0	11.1
2005–06	San Antonio	65	2	15.2	.397	.357	.683	1.4	1.9	.2	.0	5.5
Career		880	670	32.9	.405	.357	.794	2.9	6.6	.8	.1	14.4
All-Star		1	0	20.0	.357	.167	1.000	3.0	2.0	.21	.0	13.0

=== Playoffs ===
Year	Team	GP	GS	MPG	FG%	3P%	FT%	RPG	APG	SPG	BPG	PPG
1995	L.A. Lakers	10	**10**	**46.4**	.414	.318	.763	3.8	**7.3**	**2.1**	**.3**	**20.0**
1996	L.A. Lakers	4	4	34.3	.296	.313	.769	**4.0**	6.8	.5	.0	11.8
1997	L.A. Lakers	9	9	39.2	.378	.273	**.824**	3.4	6.4	1.1	.0	14.4
1998	L.A. Lakers	13	0	28.2	.331	.314	.725	2.5	4.2	.6	.1	11.6
2002	Dallas	8	1	33.0	.366	.206	.667	3.0	3.9	1.0	.0	11.1
2003	Dallas	**20**	3	33.6	**.460**	**.393**	.703	3.4	4.1	.6	.0	19.5
2006	San Antonio	12	0	11.1	.219	.300	**1.000**	1.0	1.4	.3	.2	2.2
Career		76	27	31.4	.394	.324	.753	2.9	4.5	.8	.1	13.6

== Coaching career ==
Texas Southern University hired Van Exel as an assistant coach to the Tigers men's basketball team on October 15, 2009.

On September 8, 2010, the Atlanta Hawks hired Van Exel as a player development instructor. Van Exel remained in that position for the 2010–11, 2011–12, and 2012–13 seasons. In 2013–14, he served as an assistant coach for the Milwaukee Bucks.

On July 8, 2015, Van Exel was named head coach of the Texas Legends in the NBA D-League replacing Eduardo Nájera

On June 8, 2016, Van Exel was hired by the Memphis Grizzlies to serve as an assistant coach.

After two years as a scout with the Dallas Mavericks, Van Exel returned to the Hawks as an assistant coach on August 25, 2021.

== Player highlights ==
- Van Exel was the last Laker to score in the Boston Garden when he nailed a three-pointer at the buzzer to give the Lakers the win.
- He hit a pair of clutch three-pointers for the Lakers in game 5 of the 1995 Western Conference Semifinals against the San Antonio Spurs. The first one sent the game into overtime, while the second one decided the game.
- He recorded a career-high 23 assists on January 5, 1997, against the Vancouver Grizzlies. This record has come under scrutiny when it was admitted by the scorekeeper for the Grizzlies that he intentionally inflated Van Exel's assist total due to the scorekeeper's displeasure with the NBA's scorekeeping system and wanted to prove its inaccuracy.
- He finished in the top 15 in assists in eight of 13 seasons.
- Coming into the 2005–06 season, Van Exel was first all-time among Los Angeles Lakers in three-point field goals made with 750. Midway through the season, he was surpassed by Kobe Bryant.
- He twice scored a career single-game high of 44 points, both for the Nuggets—on April 15, 2000, against the Los Angeles Clippers (along with eight assists) and on November 1, 2001 (again with eight assists) against the Milwaukee Bucks.
- Van Exel was famous throughout his playing career for his peculiar free-throw routine, in which he took his free throw attempts while standing well over a foot behind the free-throw line.

== Career awards and recognition ==
- For helping his team reach the Final Four in 1992 and the elite 8 in 1993, Van Exel was honored by the University of Cincinnati as he was inducted into the James P. Kelly Sr. Athletic Hall of Fame
- Named an NBA All-Star in 1998, along with three of his Lakers teammates
- Member of the 1994 All-Rookie Second Team
- Earned third-team All-America honors in 1993

== Personal life ==
Van Exel once appeared on an episode of MTV Cribs.

Van Exel is name-dropped in the lyrics of the 2003 Beyonce and Jay-Z song "Crazy in Love."

On January 31, 2013, Van Exel's 22-year-old son, Nickey Van Exel, was convicted of murdering his friend and sentenced to 60 years in prison. Nickey fatally shot his best friend and dumped his body in Lake Ray Hubbard. This was done in fear that his friend, Bradley Eyo, would tell authorities about a string of robberies the two had committed together.

== See also ==
- List of NBA career assists leaders
- List of NBA career 3-point scoring leaders
- List of NBA single-game assists leaders
- List of people banned or suspended by the NBA
