= 1994–95 NBA season =

49th NBA season

- League: National Basketball Association
- Sport: Basketball
- Duration: November 4, 1994 – April 23, 1995; April 27 – June 4, 1995 (Playoffs); June 7–14, 1995 (Finals)
- Teams: 27
- TV partner(s): NBC, TBS, TNT

Draft
- Top draft pick: Glenn Robinson
- Picked by: Milwaukee Bucks

Regular season
- Top seed: San Antonio Spurs
- Season MVP: David Robinson (San Antonio)
- Top scorer: Shaquille O'Neal (Orlando)

Playoffs
- Eastern champions: Orlando Magic
- Eastern runners-up: Indiana Pacers
- Western champions: Houston Rockets
- Western runners-up: San Antonio Spurs

Finals
- Champions: Houston Rockets
- Runners-up: Orlando Magic
- Finals MVP: Hakeem Olajuwon (Houston)

NBA seasons
- ← 1993–94 1995–96 →

The 1994–95 NBA season was the 49th season of the National Basketball Association (NBA). The season ended with the Houston Rockets defeating the Orlando Magic 4–0 in the NBA Finals to be crowned champions.

== Notable occurrences ==
Coaching changes
Offseason
Team	1993–94 coach	1994–95 coach
Dallas Mavericks	Quinn Buckner	Dick Motta
Los Angeles Clippers	Bob Weiss	Bill Fitch
Los Angeles Lakers	Magic Johnson	Del Harris
Minnesota Timberwolves	Sidney Lowe	Bill Blair
New Jersey Nets	Chuck Daly	Butch Beard
Philadelphia 76ers	Fred Carter	John Lucas
Portland Trail Blazers	Rick Adelman	P.J. Carlesimo
San Antonio Spurs	John Lucas	Bob Hill
Washington Bullets	Wes Unseld	Jim Lynam
In-season
Team	Outgoing coach	Incoming coach
Denver Nuggets	Dan Issel	Gene Littles
Denver Nuggets	Gene Littles	Bernie Bickerstaff
Golden State Warriors	Don Nelson	Bob Lanier
Miami Heat	Kevin Loughery	Alvin Gentry

- The Houston Rockets became the lowest seeded team to ever win the NBA Finals, winning as the sixth seed in the Western Conference. The Rockets also became the first team to defeat four opponents who had 50 or more wins en route to a title (Utah, Phoenix, San Antonio and Orlando); the only other team ever to accomplish that feat was the 2000–01 Los Angeles Lakers.
- The 1995 NBA All-Star Game was played at America West Arena in Phoenix, Arizona, with the West defeating the East 139–112. Mitch Richmond of the Sacramento Kings was named the game's MVP (Most Valuable Player).
- Late in the season, Michael Jordan returned to the Chicago Bulls after an attempt at a minor-league baseball career. His announcement consisted of a two-word fax: "I'm back." Because the Bulls had already retired his number 23, he returned wearing number 45. However, he changed back to 23 during the playoffs.
- An era came to an end as the Boston Celtics played their final season at the historic Boston Garden.
- The Portland Trail Blazers played their final season at Memorial Coliseum (renamed as the Veterans Memorial Coliseum as of 2012). They would host a preseason game at the Coliseum in 2009.
- The Chicago Bulls played their first season at the United Center.
- The Cleveland Cavaliers played their first season at Gund Arena (now known as Rocket Arena).
- Due to extensive renovations to the Seattle Center Coliseum (renamed as KeyArena following the season), the Seattle SuperSonics played their home games at the Tacoma Dome, in nearby Tacoma, Washington.
- Grant Hill became the first rookie in professional sports to lead fan balloting for the NBA All-Star Game.
- The Orlando Magic became the first of the four late 1980s expansion franchises to reach the NBA Finals. They were swept in four games by the defending champion Houston Rockets.
- Lenny Wilkens passed Red Auerbach to become the NBA's all-time leader in wins, which stood for 15 years.
- Moses Malone, the only remaining active former ABA player, announced his retirement after 19 NBA seasons. Malone, who came to the professional level without any college basketball experience, retired just in time for a new generation of prep-to-pro stars like Kevin Garnett and Kobe Bryant to arrive on the scene.
- In an effort to increase scoring, the NBA's competition committee voted to shorten the three-point field goal line to a uniform 22 feet around the basket beginning this season and lasting through the 1996–97 NBA season. Orlando Magic forward Dennis Scott set a then-single season record for most three-pointers made with 267 during the 1995–96 NBA season (Later surpassed by Stephen Curry, who notched 402 three-pointers in the 2015–16 NBA season). The NBA would revert to its original three-point field goal parameters of 23 feet, 9 inches (22 feet at the corners) at the start of the 1997–98 NBA season.
- Starting this season, players fouled while in the act of shooting a three-point attempt would get three free throws instead of two.
- Hand-checking was eliminated from the end line in the backcourt to the opposite foul line.
- The Western Conference Finals series between the San Antonio Spurs and Houston Rockets was notable for the lack of home team success. The home team lost each of the first 5 games of the series, with the Rockets finally breaking through with a home win in Game 6.
- The Miami Heat made two blockbuster trades. The first one was 2 days before the season when Miami traded Rony Seikaly to the Golden State Warriors for Billy Owens and Sasha Danilovic. Then, 2 games into the season after a game against the Phoenix Suns, Miami traded Grant Long, Steve Smith and a 1996 1st round pick to the Atlanta Hawks for Kevin Willis and a 1996 1st round pick. The latter trade was so one-sided (Miami missed the playoffs altogether while Atlanta became a contender in the East) that it was credited with spurring the Heat to make their biggest decision in franchise history: hiring Pat Riley to be their coach and top executive.
- In the last game of the regular season for both teams, the Denver Nuggets defeated the Sacramento Kings to obtain the eighth and final playoff spot in the Western Conference. Had the Kings won, they would have qualified instead. They had missed the playoffs for nine straight seasons. As for the Nuggets, this was their final postseason appearance until 2004.
- For the first time since the 1971–72 season, the league brought the first wave of third jerseys. The Atlanta Hawks, Charlotte Hornets, Detroit Pistons, Orlando Magic, Phoenix Suns and Sacramento Kings released new alternate uniforms for the season.
- The Los Angeles Lakers retired James Worthy's jersey number 42 in December and the Boston Celtics retired the late Reggie Lewis jersey number 35 on their rafters, the last season in which both teams retired a jersey until 2017–18.
- On November 5, 1994, the San Antonio Spurs first home of the season, against the Golden State Warriors, was delayed for 50 minutes as the pregame fireworks show triggered a water cannon that sent water blasting down on fans, players and coaches for four minutes before it was shut off.

== 1994–95 NBA changes ==
- The Atlanta Hawks added new black alternate uniforms.
- The Charlotte Hornets added new navy and purple alternate uniforms.
- The Chicago Bulls moved into the United Center.
- The Cleveland Cavaliers changed their logo and uniforms, replacing their blue and orange colors with light blue, remained orange and black. They also moved into the Gund Arena (now Rocket Arena).
- The Detroit Pistons added new red alternate uniforms with side panels to their jerseys and shorts.
- The Orlando Magic changed their road uniforms to blue pinstripe jerseys, while their primary black pinstripe uniforms became their alternate jerseys.
- The Philadelphia 76ers changed their uniforms, adding side panels and removing stars to the jerseys and shorts.
- The Phoenix Suns added new black alternate uniforms.
- The Sacramento Kings changed their logo and uniforms, replacing their blue and red colors with purple and black. They also added new half black and half purple alternate uniforms.
- The Seattle SuperSonics moved into the Tacoma Dome for the season, due to renovations at the Seattle Center Coliseum.

== NBA awards ==
=== Yearly awards ===
- NBA Most Valuable Player: David Robinson, San Antonio Spurs
- NBA Rookie of the Year: Grant Hill, Detroit Pistons & Jason Kidd, Dallas Mavericks
- NBA Defensive Player of the Year: Dikembe Mutombo, Denver Nuggets
- Sixth Man of the Year: Anthony Mason, New York Knicks
- NBA Most Improved Player: Dana Barros, Philadelphia 76ers
- NBA Coach of the Year: Del Harris, Los Angeles Lakers

- All-NBA First Team:
  - F – Karl Malone, Utah Jazz
  - F – Scottie Pippen, Chicago Bulls
  - C – David Robinson, San Antonio Spurs
  - G – John Stockton, Utah Jazz
  - G – Penny Hardaway, Orlando Magic
- All-NBA Second Team:
  - F – Charles Barkley, Phoenix Suns
  - F – Shawn Kemp, Seattle SuperSonics
  - C – Shaquille O'Neal, Orlando Magic
  - G – Gary Payton, Seattle SuperSonics
  - G – Mitch Richmond, Sacramento Kings
- All-NBA Third Team:
  - F – Dennis Rodman, San Antonio Spurs
  - F – Detlef Schrempf, Seattle SuperSonics
  - C – Hakeem Olajuwon, Houston Rockets
  - G – Clyde Drexler, Portland Trail Blazers, Houston Rockets
  - G – Reggie Miller, Indiana Pacers

- NBA All-Defensive First Team:
  - F – Dennis Rodman, San Antonio Spurs
  - F – Scottie Pippen, Chicago Bulls
  - C – David Robinson, San Antonio Spurs
  - G – Mookie Blaylock, Atlanta Hawks
  - G – Gary Payton, Seattle SuperSonics
- NBA All-Defensive Second Team:
  - F – Horace Grant, Orlando Magic
  - F – Derrick McKey, Indiana Pacers
  - C – Dikembe Mutombo, Denver Nuggets
  - G – John Stockton, Utah Jazz
  - G – Nate McMillan, Seattle SuperSonics

- NBA All-Rookie First Team:
  - Brian Grant, Sacramento Kings
  - Grant Hill, Detroit Pistons
  - Jason Kidd, Dallas Mavericks
  - Eddie Jones, Los Angeles Lakers
  - Glenn Robinson, Milwaukee Bucks
- All-NBA Rookie Second Team:
  - Juwan Howard, Washington Bullets
  - Eric Montross, Boston Celtics
  - Wesley Person, Phoenix Suns
  - Jalen Rose, Denver Nuggets
  - Donyell Marshall, Minnesota Timberwolves, Golden State Warriors
  - Sharone Wright, Philadelphia 76ers

== Standings ==
=== By division ===
Atlantic Division	W	L	PCT	GB	Home	Road	Div
c-Orlando Magic	57	25	.695	—	39–2	18–23	18–10
x-New York Knicks	55	27	.671	2	29–12	26–15	23–5
x-Boston Celtics	35	47	.427	22	20–21	15–26	14–14
Miami Heat	32	50	.390	25	22–19	10–31	9–19
New Jersey Nets	30	52	.366	27	20–21	10–31	13–15
Philadelphia 76ers	24	58	.293	33	14–27	10–31	12–16
Washington Bullets	21	61	.256	36	13–28	8–33	9–19

Central Division	W	L	PCT	GB	Home	Road	Div
y-Indiana Pacers	52	30	.634	–	33–8	19–22	18–10
x-Charlotte Hornets	50	32	.610	2	29–12	21–20	17–11
x-Chicago Bulls	47	35	.573	5	28–13	19–22	16–12
x-Cleveland Cavaliers	43	39	.524	9	26–15	17–24	17–11
x-Atlanta Hawks	42	40	.512	10	24–17	18–23	9–19
Milwaukee Bucks	34	48	.415	18	22–19	12–29	13–15
Detroit Pistons	28	54	.341	24	22–19	6–35	8–20

Midwest Division	W	L	PCT	GB	Home	Road	Div
z-San Antonio Spurs	62	20	.756	—	33–8	29–12	20–6
x-Utah Jazz	60	22	.732	2	33–8	27–14	17–9
x-Houston Rockets	47	35	.573	15	25–16	22–19	13–13
x-Denver Nuggets	41	41	.500	21	23–18	18–23	13–13
Dallas Mavericks	36	46	.439	26	19–22	17–24	11–15
Minnesota Timberwolves	21	61	.256	41	13–28	8–33	4–22

Pacific Division	W	L	PCT	GB	Home	Road	Div
y-Phoenix Suns	59	23	.720	—	32–9	27–14	23–7
x-Seattle SuperSonics	57	25	.695	2	32–9	25–16	16–14
x-Los Angeles Lakers	48	34	.585	11	29–12	19–22	15–15
x-Portland Trail Blazers	44	38	.537	15	26–15	18–23	17–13
Sacramento Kings	39	43	.476	20	27–14	12–29	17–13
Golden State Warriors	26	56	.317	33	15–26	11–30	11–19
Los Angeles Clippers	17	65	.207	42	13–28	4–37	6–24

=== By conference ===
#	Eastern Conference				
#	Team	W	L	PCT	GB
1	c-Orlando Magic	57	25	.695	–
2	y-Indiana Pacers	52	30	.634	5
3	x-New York Knicks	55	27	.671	2
4	x-Charlotte Hornets	50	32	.610	7
5	x-Chicago Bulls	47	35	.573	10
6	x-Cleveland Cavaliers	43	39	.524	14
7	x-Atlanta Hawks	42	40	.512	15
8	x-Boston Celtics	35	47	.427	22
9	Milwaukee Bucks	34	48	.415	23
10	Miami Heat	32	50	.390	25
11	New Jersey Nets	30	52	.366	27
12	Detroit Pistons	28	54	.341	29
13	Philadelphia 76ers	24	58	.293	33
14	Washington Bullets	21	61	.256	36

#	Western Conference				
#	Team	W	L	PCT	GB
1	z-San Antonio Spurs	62	20	.756	–
2	y-Phoenix Suns	59	23	.720	3
3	x-Utah Jazz	60	22	.732	2
4	x-Seattle SuperSonics	57	25	.695	5
5	x-Los Angeles Lakers	48	34	.585	14
6	x-Houston Rockets	47	35	.573	15
7	x-Portland Trail Blazers	44	38	.537	18
8	x-Denver Nuggets	41	41	.500	21
9	Sacramento Kings	39	43	.476	23
10	Dallas Mavericks	36	46	.439	26
11	Golden State Warriors	26	56	.317	36
12	Minnesota Timberwolves	21	61	.256	41
13	Los Angeles Clippers	17	65	.207	45

Notes

- z – Clinched home court advantage for the entire playoffs
- c – Clinched home court advantage for the conference playoffs
- y – Clinched division title
- x – Clinched playoff spot

== Playoffs ==
Teams in bold advanced to the next round. The numbers to the left of each team indicate the team's seeding in its conference, and the numbers to the right indicate the number of games the team won in that round. The division champions are marked by an asterisk. Home court advantage does not necessarily belong to the higher-seeded team, but instead the team with the better regular season record; teams enjoying the home advantage are shown in italics.

First Round	Conference Semifinals
**E1**	**Orlando***	**3**
E8	Boston	1
**E1**	**Orlando***	**4**
E5	Chicago	2
E4	Charlotte	1
**E5**	**Chicago**	**3**
**Eastern Conference**
**E3**	**New York**	**3**
E6	Cleveland	1
E3	New York	3
**E2**	**Indiana***	**4**
**E2**	**Indiana***	**3**
E7	Atlanta	0
**W1**	**San Antonio***	**3**
W8	Denver	0
**W1**	**San Antonio***	**4**
W5	LA Lakers	2
W4	Seattle	1
**W5**	**LA Lakers**	**3**
**Western Conference**
W3	Utah	2
**W6**	**Houston**	**3**
**W6**	**Houston**	**4**
W2	Phoenix*	3
**W2**	**Phoenix***	**3**
W7	Portland	0

Conference Finals
**E1**	**Orlando***	**4**
E2	Indiana*	3
W1	San Antonio*	2
**W6**	**Houston**	**4**

NBA Finals
E1	Orlando*	0
**W6**	**Houston**	**4**

- * Division winner
- **Bold** Series winner
- Italic Team with home-court advantage

== Statistics leaders ==
Category	Player	Team	Stat
Points per game	Shaquille O'Neal	Orlando Magic	29.3
Rebounds per game	Dennis Rodman	San Antonio Spurs	16.8
Assists per game	John Stockton	Utah Jazz	12.3
Steals per game	Scottie Pippen	Chicago Bulls	2.94
Blocks per game	Dikembe Mutombo	Denver Nuggets	3.91
FG%	Chris Gatling	Golden State Warriors	.633
FT%	Spud Webb	Sacramento Kings	.934
3FG%	Steve Kerr	Chicago Bulls	.524

== See also ==
- List of NBA regular season records
