= DeeAndre Hulett =

American basketball player (born 1980)

Personal information
- Born: December 29, 1980 (age 45) Saginaw, Michigan, U.S.
- Listed height: 6 ft 8 in (2.03 m)
- Listed weight: 215 lb (98 kg)

Career information
- High school: Arthur Hill (Saginaw, Michigan)
- College: College of the Sequoias (1998–2000)
- NBA draft: 2000: 2nd round, 46th overall pick
- Drafted by: Toronto Raptors
- Playing career: 1999–2003
- Position: Small forward

Career history
- 1999–2001: Las Vegas Silver Bandits
- 2001: St. Louis Swarm
- 2001–2002: Greenville Groove
- 2002–2003: Fabriano Basket
- Stats at Basketball Reference

DeeAndre Hulett (born December 29, 1980) is an American former professional basketball player.

Hulett averaged 24.2 points, 13.1 rebounds and 4 blocks per game in his senior year of high school at Arthur Hill, and received all-state honors. After playing collegiately at College of the Sequoias from 1998 to 1999, he signed with the Las Vegas Silver Bandits of the International Basketball League. He was selected by the Toronto Raptors in the second round (46th overall) of the 2000 NBA draft. However, Hulett never played in an NBA game, making him 1 of 8 players from the 2000 NBA Draft to never play in the league.

Listed at 6 feet 8 inches (2.03 m) and 215 pounds (98 kg), he primarily played small forward. Hulett attended Arthur Hill High School and was the second runner-up for Mr. Basketball of Michigan in 1998.

On March 23, 2001, Hulett signed with the St. Louis Swarm of the International Basketball League. Later that day, he scored a game-high 28 points in a 106–100 overtime victory against the Gary Steelheads.

Hulett was drafted in the third round (19th overall) by the Greenville Groove in the inaugural National Basketball Developmental League draft in 2001. He played 34 games with 27 starts and averaged 11.1 points and 3.9 rebounds per game for Greenville during the 2001–02 season. On February 22, 2002, Hulett was released for "repeated violations of league policy".

He played for Santiago's Los Pepines basketball club in the Dominican Republic.
