= Bryant Notree =

American basketball player and coach

Personal information
- Born: June 19, 1976 (age 50) Chicago, Illinois, U.S.
- Listed height: 6 ft 5 in (1.96 m)
- Listed weight: 205 lb (93 kg)

Career information
- High school: Simeon (Chicago, Illinois)
- College: Illinois (1994–1997); UIC (1998–1999)
- NBA draft: 1999: undrafted
- Playing career: 1999–2005
- Position: Small forward / shooting guard
- Coaching career: 2005–2006

Career history

Playing
- 1999–2001: New Mexico Slam
- 2001–2002: Keravnos
- 2002–2003: Gary Steelheads
- 2003: Atléticos de San Germán
- 2003: Xinjiang Flying Tigers
- 2003–2004: Avtodor Saratov
- 2004: Lokomotiv Novosibirsk
- 2005: Dakota Wizards

Career highlights
- All-CBA First Team (2003); First-team All-MCC (1999); First-team Parade All-American (1994)

Bryant Notree (born June 19, 1976) is an American former professional basketball player and coach. Born in Chicago, Illinois, he played college basketball for the Illinois Fighting Illini and UIC Flames.

== Professional career ==
After graduating from UIC in 1999, Notree started his professional career in the International Basketball League with the New Mexico Slam, spending two seasons there. He participated in the 2001 preseason with the Memphis Grizzlies of the NBA, but was cut before the start of the 2001–02 NBA season. He then moved to Cyprus, signing with Keravnos. During his stint with the club, he took part in the 2001–02 FIBA Saporta Cup, averaging 21.8 points and 4.8 rebounds per game in 6 appearances.

In 2002 he took part in the Shaw's Pro Summer League with the Atlanta Hawks and was briefly signed by the Denver Nuggets, taking part in preseason games, but did not make it to the final roster, being released on October 17, 2002. He played for the Gary Steelheads of the Continental Basketball Association (CBA) during the 2002–03 season and was named to the All-CBA First Team after averaging 21.3 points, 5.4 rebounds and 3.7 assists per game over 48 appearances (44 starts).

Notree was diagnosed with hypertrophic cardiomyopathy during a routine medical checkup in Israel but persisted playing despite the health risks. In 2003 he played 8 games for Atléticos de San Germán in the Baloncesto Superior Nacional of Puerto Rico, averaging 17.9 points, 5.5 rebounds and 2.1 assists per game. He then played for Avtodor Saratov of the Russian Super League, averaging 17.8 points, 4.2 rebounds and 3.7 assists per game over 12 games. He then started the 2004–05 season with Lokomotiv Novosibirsk, with averages of 10.7 points, 3 rebounds and 2.8 assists, before going back to the United States.

His final stint was with the Dakota Wizards of the CBA before he retired in 2005 out of concern for his family. In his final season, Notree played 27 regular season games with averages of 16.1 points, 4.1 rebounds and 4.5 assists; he also appeared in 5 playoff games, averaging 28 points, 4.4 rebounds and 6.2 assists per game. The Wizards named him an assistant coach for the 2005–06 season.

== Personal life ==
Notree works as a personal trainer and nutritional consultant in Dallas, Texas. He is the father of current CFL linebacker Bryce Notree.
