= Trenton Shooting Stars =

American basketball team

- League: IBL
- Founded: 1999
- Folded: 2001
- Arena: Sovereign Bank Arena
- Capacity: 8,600
- Location: Trenton, New Jersey
- Team colors: white, blue, black
- President: Larry Keating
- Ownership: Herb Greenberg
- Website: www.iblhoops.com/teams/stars (archived on March 11, 2000)

The Trenton Shooting Stars were a professional basketball team in the International Basketball League (IBL) from 1999 to 2001.

== History ==
The team was owned by Herb Greenberg and Larry Keating was the president: Kevin Mackey was named coach and director of basketball operations in May 1999, and the newly opened Sovereign Bank Arena was the home court. During the IBL inaugural draft the Shooting Stars selected the following players: Kevin Ollie, Mark Baker, Shawnelle Scott, Todd Lindeman, Tyrone Grant, James Martin, Willie Simms, Moochie Norris, LaMarr Greer, Ryan Bowen and Cassette Wesson. Mackey resigned on January 19, 2000, citing health issues, and he was replaced by his assistant coach John Carideo, who stayed as the head coach until the end of the 2000–01 season. In the first IBL season the team finished with a 32–32 record: Ray Tutt was the leading scorer with 19.4 points per game, while Tyrone Grant led the team in rebounds with 8.8 and Ryan Lorthridge was the assist leader with 8 per game. Lorthridge was also the league assist leader. The Shooting Stars qualified for the playoffs, finishing second in the East Division behind the Cincinnati Stuff, but lost in the first round of the playoffs to the Richmond Rhythm.

In the second season, the team finished with an improved record of 27–25 (.519) and again qualified for the playoffs: they defeated the Cincinnati Stuff in the first round, but lost in the second round to the Grand Rapids Hoops. For the second year in a row, Ryan Lorthridge led the IBL in assists with 8.6 per game. The franchise ceased operations after the IBL folded in 2001.

== Season-by-season records ==
Season	GP	W	L	Pct.	Head coach(s)
1999–00	64	32	32	.500	Kevin Mackey, John Carideo
2000–01	52	27	25	.519	John Carideo

== All-time roster ==
- Larry Abney
- Lloyd Daniels
- Nick Davis
- Dell Demps
- Shane Drisdom
- Dennis Edwards
- Tyrone Grant
- LaMarr Greer
- Jermaine Guice
- Deon Hames
- Greg Harris
- Kermit Holmes
- Antoine Hyman
- Mike Jones
- Michael-Hakim Jordan
- Garth Joseph
- Ray Kelly
- Kirk King
- Mike Lloyd
- Ryan Lorthridge
- Michael Maddox
- Gabe Muoneke
- Damian Owens
- Frantz Pierre-Louis
- George Reese
- Antonio Reynolds Dean
- Terrance Roberson
- Marvin Rodgers
- Richard Mason Rocca
- Ray Tutt
- K'Zell Wesson
- Duane Woodward
- Stephen Worthy
- Alvin Young

== Awards ==
- All-IBL First team: Ryan Lorthridge (2000), Ray Tutt (2001)
- All-IBL Second team: Ray Tutt (2000)
