= Larry Abney =

American basketball player (born 1977)

Personal information
- Born: May 19, 1977 (age 49) Nyack, New York, U.S.
- Listed height: 6 ft 8 in (2.03 m)
- Listed weight: 236 lb (107 kg)

Career information
- High school: Nyack (Nyack, New York)
- College: Fresno CC (1996–1997); Fresno State (1997–2000)
- NBA draft: 2000: undrafted
- Playing career: 2000–2012
- Position: Power forward

Career history

Playing
- 2000: Pennsylvania ValleyDawgs
- 2000–2001: Trenton Shooting Stars
- 2001: Pennsylvania ValleyDawgs
- 2001–2002: Mobis Automons
- 2002: Adirondack Wildcats
- 2002–2003: Asheville Altitude
- 2003–2004: Beauvais BC
- 2004–2005: ETHA Engomis
- 2005: Cocodrilos de Caracas
- 2005: New Jersey Flyers
- 2005: Reales de La Vega
- 2005–2007: Townsville Crocodiles
- 2006: Étendard de Brest
- 2007: Al Jaish Damascus
- 2007–2008: Cairns Taipans
- 2009: EiffelTowers Den Bosch
- 2009: Ciclista Olímpico
- 2009: Estudiantes
- 2010: Halcones Rojos Veracruz
- 2010: Khimik
- 2010: Gimnasia
- 2012: Southland Sharks
- 2012: Townsville Crocodiles

Coaching
- 2023–2024: Ontario Clippers (assistant)
- 2024–2025: Saskatchewan Rattlers

Career highlights
- Dutch Cup champion (2009); DBL All-Star (2009); All-NBL First Team (2006); All-NBL Second Team (2007); USBL All-Rookie Team (2000); Second-team All-WAC (2000)

Lawrence Austin Abney (born May 19, 1977) is an American former professional basketball player who was most recently the head coach of the Saskatchewan Rattlers of the Canadian Elite Basketball League (CEBL). Born in Nyack, New York, he was nicknamed Birdman throughout his career for his athleticism.

== High school career ==
Abney attended Nyack High School in Nyack, New York. As a junior in 1993–94, he averaged 16.0 points and 10.0 rebounds per game as he earned fourth team all-state honors. As a senior in 1994–95, he averaged 18.5 points, 15.0 rebounds and 5.0 blocks per game as he earned honorable mention All-America honors from USA Today as well as first team all-state honors.

In April 1995, he signed a National Letter of Intent to play college basketball for Fresno State University.

== College career ==
After sitting out the 1995–96 season while meeting NCAA eligibility requirements, Abney spent his freshman season at Fresno City College in 1996–97 where he helped the Rams to their first Central Valley Conference title since 1987 and a berth in the state final four. In 34 games, he averaged 10.8 points and 7.9 rebounds per game.

In 1997, Abney returned to Fresno State where as a sophomore in 1997–98, he was one of three players to play in all 34 games, starting in 13. He posted seven double-digit scoring games and had three double-doubles. In those 34 games, he averaged 5.5 points and 4.1 rebounds per game. In his junior season, he finished second on the team in field goal percentage with .559 and spent two weeks as an American representative on the People to People basketball tour in Greece. In 33 games (25 starts), he averaged 6.2 points and 7.0 rebounds per game.

In his senior season, he was named to the All-WAC second team after he helped Fresno State win the Western Athletic Conference championship. In 34 games, he averaged 10.3 points, 11.8 rebounds and 1.4 blocks per game. On February 17, 2000, he broke a modern-day (post-1973) NCAA Division I record when he pulled down 35 rebounds in a game against Southern Methodist University – the most in a single game since 1965.

== Professional career ==
=== Early years (2000–2005) ===
After graduating from Fresno State, Abney joined the Pennsylvania ValleyDawgs for the 2000 United States Basketball League season. In July 2000, he joined the Denver Nuggets for the Rocky Mountain Revue. Later that year, he signed with the Trenton Shooting Stars for the 2000–01 IBL season.

In 2001, he re-joined the Pennsylvania ValleyDawgs. Later that year, he signed with the Mobis Automons for the 2001–02 Korean Basketball League season. Following the KBL season, he joined the Adirondack Wildcats for the 2002 USBL season. In July 2002, he joined the Boston Celtics for the 2002 NBA Summer League.

On October 31, 2002, he was selected in the 10th round of the 2002 NBA D-League draft by the Asheville Altitude. In 2003, he signed with Beauvais BC of France for the 2003–04 LNB Pro B season, and in 2004, he signed with ETHA Engomis of Cyprus for the 2004–05 Cyprus Basketball Division 1 season.

In the 2005 off-season, he played for Cocodrilos de Caracas, the New Jersey Flyers and Reales de La Vega.

=== Australia (2005–2008) ===
In August 2005, Abney signed with the Townsville Crocodiles for the 2005–06 NBL season. He went on to be named to the All-NBL first team and garnered NBL All-Star honors. On February 10, 2006, he re-signed with the Crocodiles on a two-year deal. Later that month, he joined Étendard de Brest of France for the rest of the 2005–06 LNB Pro A season.

In 2006–07, he was again an NBL All-Star honoree and was named to the All-NBL second team. In March 2007, he joined Al Jaish Damascus of Syria. On April 19, 2007, he signed a new two-year deal with the Cairns Taipans, reportedly leaving the Crocodiles for more money. In 2007–08, he was again an NBL All-Star honoree.

On December 11, 2008, Abney was released by the Taipans because the club could not longer afford him, fellow import Dave Thomas or head coach Alan Black. The Taipans did continue playing, however, only after the entire team agreed to a blanket 45 per cent pay cut for the rest of the season.

=== Europe and Argentina (2009–2010) ===
On January 19, 2009, Abney signed with EiffelTowers Den Bosch for the rest of the 2008–09 season.

In the summer of 2009, he signed with Ciclista Olímpico of Argentina for the 2009–10 season. In November 2009, he left Ciclista Olímpico and signed with Estudiantes de Bahía Blanca. In December 2009, he left Estudiantes after seven games. In February 2010, he signed with Halcones Rojos Veracruz of Mexico but left after just eight games. On March 18, 2010, he signed with BC Khimik of the Ukrainian Basketball SuperLeague. However, on April 8, 2010, he was waived by Khimik after just four games.

In the summer of 2010, he signed with Gimnasia y Esgrima of Argentina for the 2010–11 season. In November 2010, he left Gimnasia. The next month, he received a try-out from BC Odesa of Ukraine.

=== Return to NBL (2012) ===
On January 11, 2012, Abney signed with the Southland Sharks for the 2012 New Zealand NBL season.

On October 2, 2012, Abney returned to the Townsville Crocodiles, signing with the club for the 2012–13 NBL season. However, on November 28, 2012, he announced his retirement on advice from his surgeon, who discovered a small hole in his thigh bone. He managed just nine games for the Crocodiles in 2012–13, averaging 4.4 points and 3.4 rebounds per game.

== Corporate career ==
Following his retirement from professional basketball, Abney transitioned into corporate America, eventually earning a position as a District Sales Manager for Pepsico FritoLay North America, where he remained until 2017.

== Coaching career ==
In 2017, Abney joined the staff of the Los Angeles Clippers as a player development coach and basketball operations assistant under head coach Glenn "Doc" Rivers.

On February 15, 2024, Abney became head coach of the Saskatchewan Rattlers of the Canadian Elite Basketball League.

== Personal ==
Abney is the son of Robin Hauser. He has one younger brother, three younger sisters, and four sons. In 2017 he received his master's degree in Business Administration from the Craig School of Business (Fresno State). In 2018 alongside childhood friends, former teammates, and fellow Rockland, NY natives Steve Canal and Chester Felts, Abney co-founded Rockland Legacy, an organization that provides support and mentorship to help Rockland County's youth achieve their dreams.

== See also ==
- List of NCAA Division I men's basketball players with 30 or more rebounds in a game
