= Larry Keating (athletic director) =

American collegiate basketball coach and athletics administrator

Larry Keating or Laurence Charles Keating Jr. (July 26, 1944 – May 25, 2021) is the former athletic director for Seton Hall University; a position he held from 1985 to 1997. Under his tenure at Seton Hall the Seton Hall Pirates men's basketball team advanced to the championship game of the 1989 NCAA Division I Men's Final Four. He resigned from his position at Seton Hall in 1997 after refusing to fire the men's basketball coach, George Blaney. He was later the special assistant to the athletics director at the University of Kansas, in charge of scheduling basketball and football games.

== Early life ==
Keating was born on July 26, 1944. He was a native of Long Island, New York. He graduated from Stonehill College in 1966. While there, he was a member of the men's basketball team. He then served in the military in Vietnam.

== Career ==
His first coaching job was at Stonehill College. After serving for a coach at Stonehill College, he was an assistant coach for the Hofstra University men's basketball team. From 1979 to 1985, he was the athletic director at Adelphi University. From 1985 to 1997, he was the athletic director at Seton Hall University. From 1997 to 1999, he was the president and general manager of the Trenton Shooting Stars basketball team. From 1999 to 2001, he worked as an administrator for the IBL. From 2001 to 2003, he served as Assistant Commissioner for Basketball/Football Operations for the Metro Atlantic Athletic Conference (MAAC).

Keating served on the NCAA Council and chaired the NCAA Men’s Basketball Rules Committee for four years. He retired in April 2019. Also in April 2019, he was inducted into the Seton Hall Athletics Hall of Fam.

== Personal life ==
Keating's wife was Jaime. They had a son, Kerry, and two daughters Jaime and Katie. He died at the age of 76 on May 25, 2021 at his home in Southport, North Carolina.
