= Antwain Smith =

American basketball player

Personal information
- Born: May 1, 1975 (age 51) Newport News, Virginia
- Listed height: 6 ft 7 in (2.01 m)

Career information
- High school: Ferguson (Newport News, Virginia)
- College: Saint Paul's (1995–1999)
- NBA draft: 1999: 2nd round, 51st overall pick
- Drafted by: Vancouver Grizzlies
- Playing career: 1999–2002
- Position: Small forward

Career history
- 1999–2000: St. Louis Swarm
- 2000–2001: Richmond Rhythm
- 2001: Krka Novo Mesto
- 2001–2002: Fayetteville Patriots
- Stats at Basketball Reference

Antwain Smith (born May 1, 1975) is an American professional basketball player in the small forward position. He attended Saint Paul's College from 1995 to 1999.

Upon college graduation, Smith was selected with the 51st pick of the 1999 NBA draft by the Vancouver Grizzlies, but never played a game with any NBA team. He went on to play in the IBL with St. Louis Swarm (1999–00, 2000–01) and Richmond Rhythm (2000–01) and the NBDL, for the Fayetteville Patriots (2001–02, started that season in Slovenia).
