= Tyrone Grant =

American basketball player (born 1977)

Personal information
- Born: January 24, 1977 (age 49) Brooklyn, New York, U.S.
- Listed height: 6 ft 7.5 in (2.02 m)
- Listed weight: 240 lb (109 kg)

Career information
- High school: Grady (Brooklyn, New York)
- College: St. John's (1995–1999)
- NBA draft: 1999: undrafted
- Playing career: 1999–2011
- Position: Small forward / power forward
- Number: 32

Career history
- 1999–2000: Trenton Shooting Stars
- 2000–2001: Mabo Prefabbricati Livorno
- 2001–2002: De Vizia Avellino
- 2003–2004: Teramo Basket
- 2004–2005: Olympia Larissa
- 2005–2006: Armani Jeans Milano
- 2005: Leite Rio Breogan
- 2006–2007: VidiVici Bologna
- 2009–2010: Benetton Treviso
- 2010–2011: Ilysiakos Athens

Tyrone Jeremy Grant (born January 24, 1977) is an American former professional basketball player and now CEO of Team First Inc. as well as Wave Holistic Health. At a height of 2.02 m (6'7 1/2") tall, he played at the small forward and power forward positions. He was an explosive scorer and good rebounder.

== College career ==
From 1995 to 1999, Grant played college basketball at St. John's University, with the St. John's Red Storm.

== Professional career ==
Grant relocated to Europe after college, playing for a succession of sides including Mabo Prefabbricati Livorno, De Vizia Avellino, Teramo Basket, Armani Jeans Milano, VidiVici Bologna and Benetton Treviso in the Italian Serie A, Olympia Larissa in Greece and Leite Río Breogán in the Spanish Liga ACB.

== Personal life ==
On December 13, 2010, Grant founded the non-profit organization Team First Inc. They provide academic and social support services to public schools within New York, with a focus on high-poverty communities. Grant has two children who are athletes, Tyra and Tyson.
