= Siegel Center =

Building in Virginia, United States

- The Stu
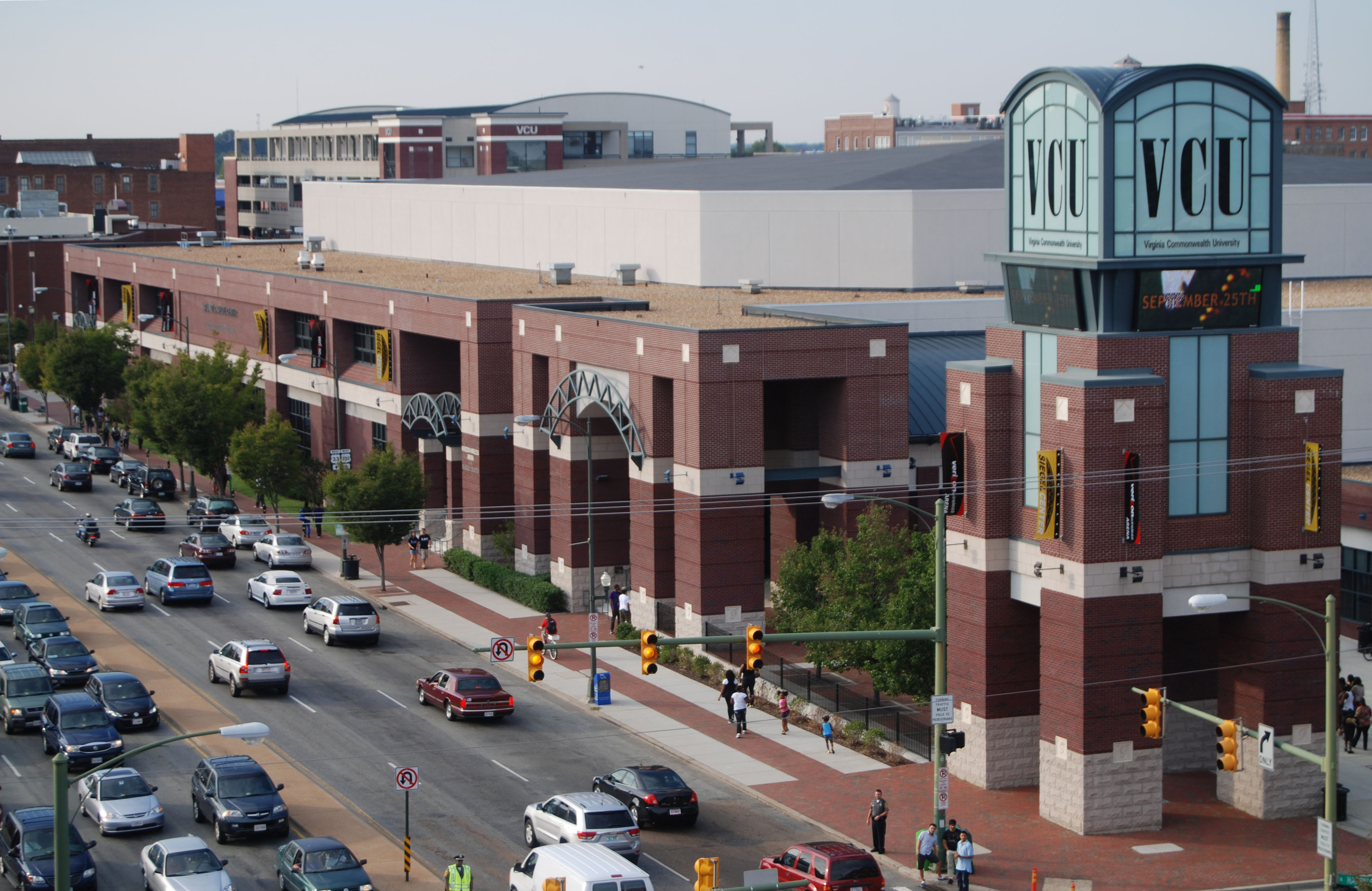
- Interactive map of Siegel Center
- Location: 1200 West Broad Street; Richmond, Virginia, 23284, USA
- Coordinates: 37.552918°N 77.4529°W
- Owner: Virginia Commonwealth University
- Operator: Virginia Commonwealth University
- Capacity: 7,637
- Surface: Hardwood

Construction
- Groundbreaking: April 23, 1996
- Opened: May 1, 1999
- Cost: $30.1 million ($58.2 million in 2025 dollars)
- Architects: Marcellus Wright Cox & Smith
- Structural engineers: Dunbar Milby Williams Pittman & Vaughan
- General contractors: Poole & Kent

Tenants
- VCU Rams (NCAA) (1999–present); Richmond Rhythm (IBL) (1999–2001)

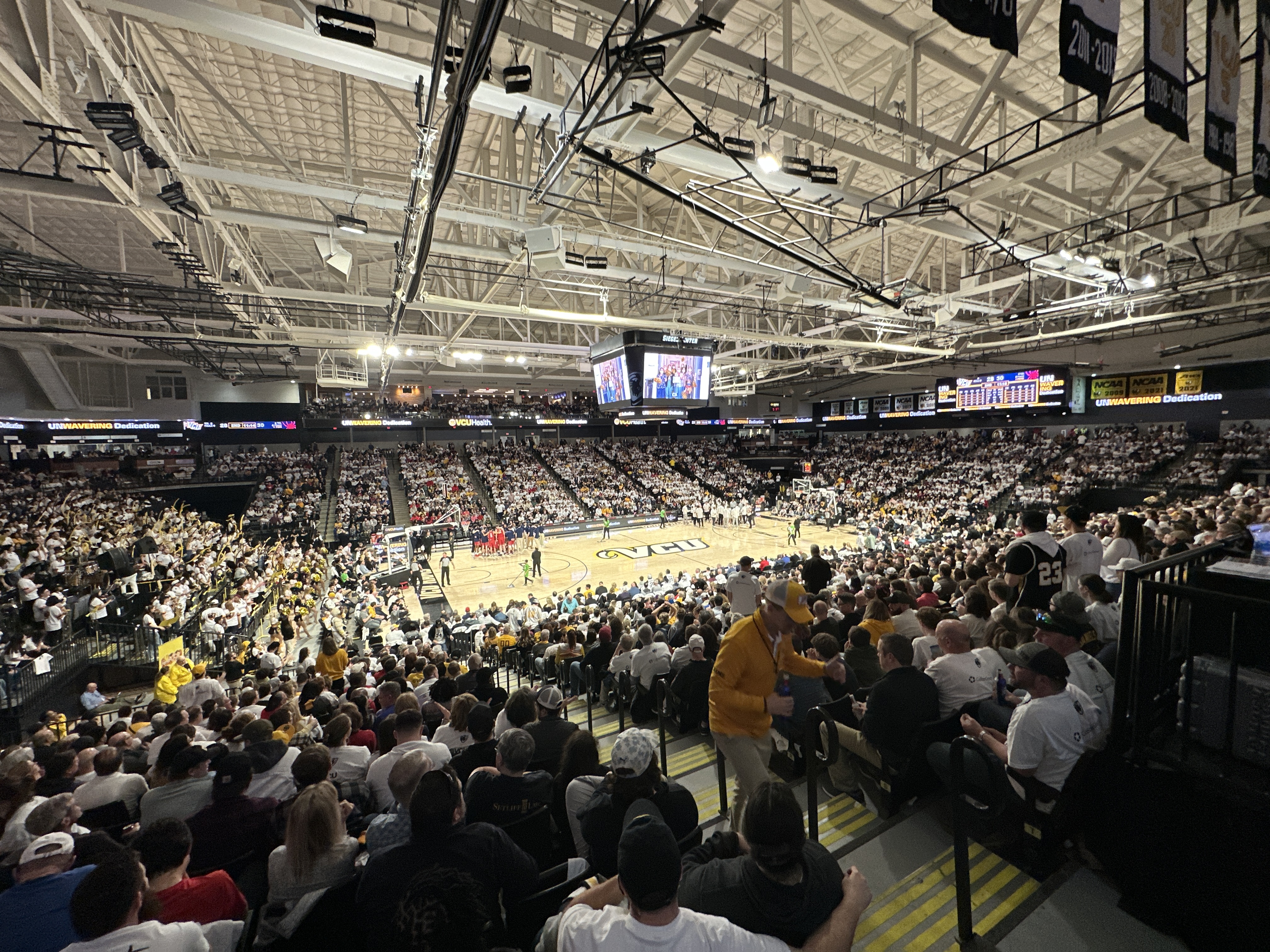
The Siegel Center in 2024, sold out against the Richmond Spiders

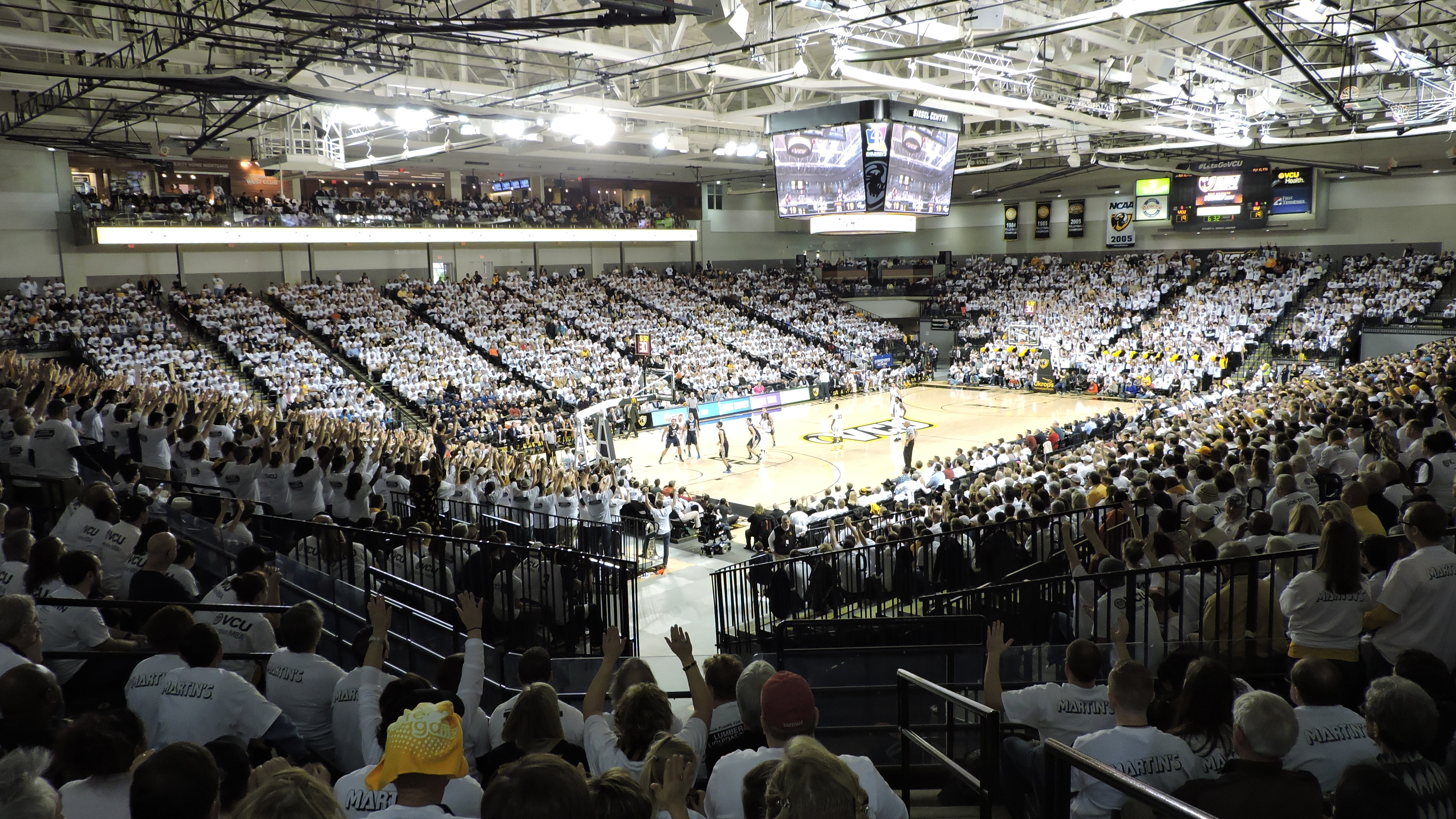
Interior look at the Siegel Center during a men's basketball white-out

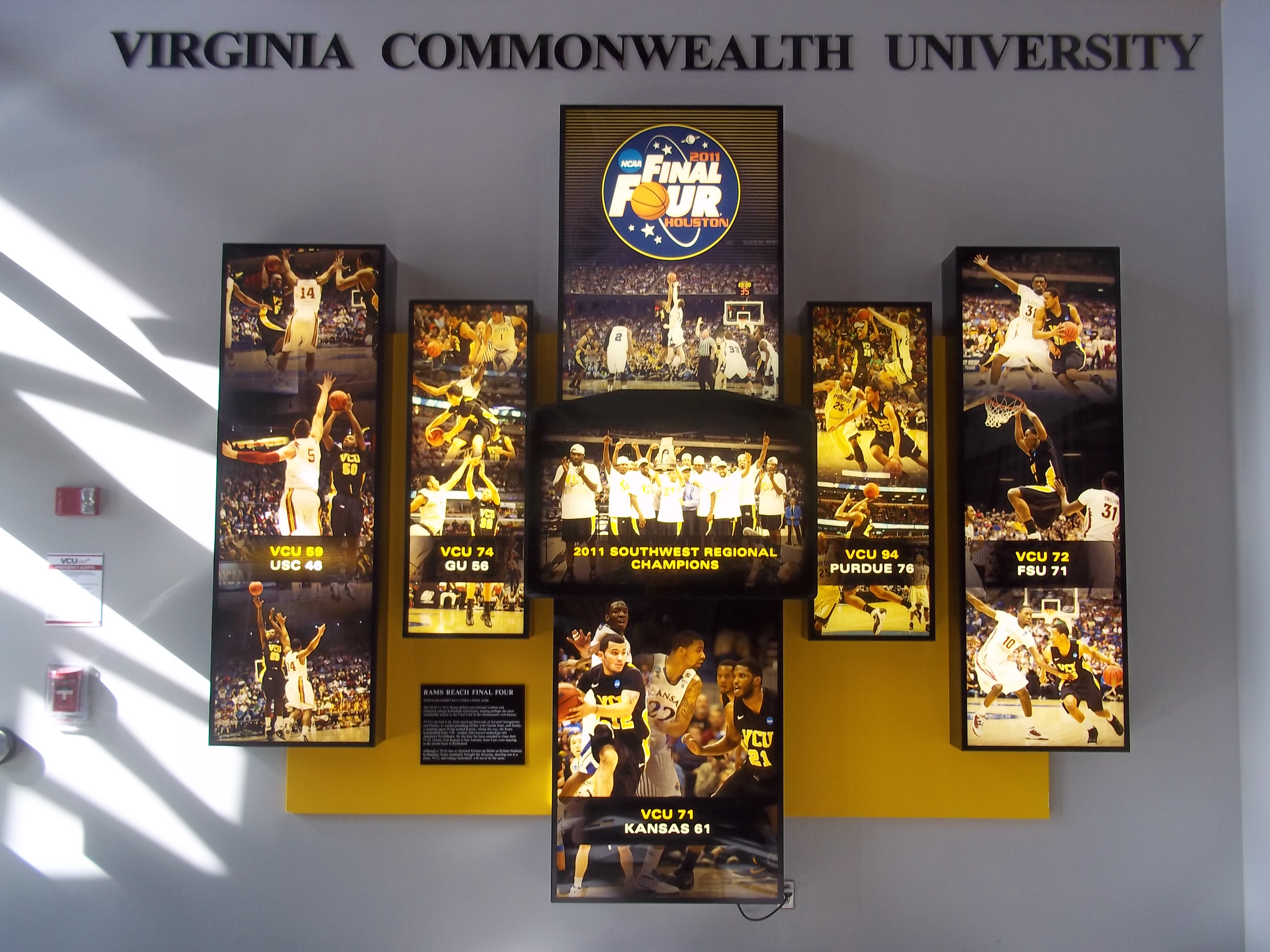
Final Four display on the concourse of the Siegel Center, commemorating VCU's 2011 NCAA tournament run

The Stuart C. Siegel Center is a 190,000-square-foot (18,000 m^{2}) multi-purpose facility on the campus of Virginia Commonwealth University in Richmond, Virginia, United States. The facility's main component is the 7,637-seat (expandable to 8,000) E.J. Wade Arena. It also served as a student recreational area until 2010, when the new Cary Street Gym complex was completed. It now is used purely for VCU athletics and includes a weight room, auxiliary basketball court, and a café. The E.J. Wade Arena hosts Division I-level NCAA inter-collegiate athletics and serves as a general-purpose assembly space for special events such as graduations, concerts, receptions, and a variety of competitions (both athletic and non-athletic). It is named after Richmond businessman Stuart C. Siegel.

The complex opened in 1999 and cost $30.1 million to construct. Seven million dollars of the cost was donated by local businessman Stuart C. Siegel; the center bears his name as a result. Its main tenant is the VCU Rams men's basketball team, which enjoys one of the nation's best home-court winning percentages since moving into the facility. The court has received the reputation as arguably the toughest place to play in the Atlantic 10 Conference. The VCU Rams men's basketball team currently holds the 11th-highest home-court winning percentage in Division I basketball with a winning percentage of 85.79 The student section, dubbed the "Rowdy Rams" is extremely passionate. In 2012–13, the Rowdy Rams received the Naismith Student Section of the Year Award, recognizing the best student section in college basketball. Until interrupted by the effects of the COVID-19 pandemic, there were 166 consecutive sold out home games at the Siegel Center between January 2011 and November 2021. The arena also routinely hosts local and state high school basketball tournaments, in addition to hosting the annual Virginia Regional (formerly VCU/NASA) FIRST Robotics Competition.

Before the 2016–17 basketball season, the arena was renamed the E.J. Wade Arena; a construction company owned by a local family in Mechanicsville, Virginia. The deal is for $2.75 million over ten years, but the Wade family has promised a total monetary donation of $4.05 million over those ten years.

== Expansion ==
=== Recent expansion ===
==== 2011 updates – West Club suites ====
In 2011, a $3.4 million facelift to the Siegel Center saw offices renovated, with the addition of luxury suites, a 120-club seat balcony, and the Tommy J. West Club, a new lounge.

==== 2014 updates – center-hung scoreboard ====
In 2014, the most major renovation since the Tommy J. West club was completed. Four corporate corner suites were installed in one end of the arena. A new Daktronics HD center-hung scoreboard was installed at center court, it features four 11.5-feet-by-15.5-feet panels, and the lower ring is two feet high by 15.5 feet wide. The Tommy J. West club was also outfitted with a large HD ribbon board that measures 2.5 feet high by 136 feet wide. The old center-hung audio system was also replaced. Now, speakers are peppered throughout the arena's roof to further immense the audience in the action. The total cost of the renovation was $1.9 million.

==== 2016 updates – corner suites ====
In 2016, the arena added four more corporate corner suites opposite the arena side that was completed in 2014. All four corners of the Siegel Center now have suites. There are four smaller ones which cost $45,000, and four larger ones which cost $60,000. Each suite requires a three-year commitment.

==== 2022–2023 updates – repainting and more video boards ====
The white and gray sidewalls were painted black for the 2022-23 season. In 2023, VCU replaced the baseline scoreboards and video boards with new, larger video boards, and surrounded the entire interior of the seating bowl with a video board stripe. The Baseline scoreboards show a combination of advertisements, individual stats, and team stats, while the stripe shows predominantly sponsor ads, with game score and clock being located in the corners.

=== Future expansion ===
Plans were at one time in the works to upgrade the Siegel Center's capacity to 10,000 seats with a total cost of $12 million. However, while the Rams once held a sellout streak of 166 consecutive games and a wait list for tickets of over 1,000, a combination of decrease in demand for tickets from the fanbase combined with the coronavirus pandemic brought the sellout streak to an end in 2021.

== See also ==
- List of NCAA Division I basketball arenas
