= Doug Smith (basketball) =

American basketball player (born 1969)

Personal information
- Born: September 17, 1969 (age 57) Detroit, Michigan, U.S.
- Listed height: 6 ft 10 in (2.08 m)
- Listed weight: 220 lb (100 kg)

Career information
- High school: Mackenzie (Detroit, Michigan)
- College: Missouri (1987–1991)
- NBA draft: 1991: 1st round, 6th overall pick
- Drafted by: Dallas Mavericks
- Playing career: 1991–2005
- Position: Power forward
- Number: 34

Career history
- 1991–1995: Dallas Mavericks
- 1995–1996: Boston Celtics
- 1996–1997: Oklahoma City Cavalry
- 1997–1999: Quad City Thunder
- 1999–2001: St. Louis Swarm
- 2001–2002: Kansas City Knights
- 2004–2005: Great Lakes Storm

Career highlights
- 2× CBA champion (1997, 1998); All-CBA Second Team (1998); IBL champion (2000); IBL MVP (2000); All-IBL First Team (2000); Consensus second-team All-American (1990); Second-team All-American – UPI (1991); Third-team All-American – AP (1991); 2× Big Eight Player of the Year (1990, 1991); 2× First-team All-Big Eight (1990, 1991); No. 34 retired by Missouri Tigers; Fourth-team Parade All-American (1987)

Career NBA statistics
- Points: 2,356 (8.0 ppg)
- Rebounds: 1,234 (4.2 rpg)
- Assists: 400 (1.4 apg)
- Stats at NBA.com
- Stats at Basketball Reference
Medals
Men's basketball
Representing United States
FIBA Americas Championship
Silver medal – second place	1989 Mexico City	Team competition
World Championship
Bronze medal – third place	1990 Buenos Aires	Team competition
Pan American Games
Silver medal – second place	1999 Winnipeg	Team competition
Goodwill Games
Silver medal – second place	1990 Seattle	Team competition

Douglas Smith (born September 17, 1969) is an American former professional basketball player. He was selected by the Dallas Mavericks as the sixth overall pick in the 1991 NBA draft.

== College career ==
Smith is a 1987 graduate of Detroit's Mackenzie High School; he played collegiate basketball for the University of Missouri, where his number 34 is retired. Smith was named the Big Eight Conference Men's Basketball Player of the Year for the 1989–90 and 1990-91 seasons and led his team to the Big Eight Conference Championship.

== Professional career ==
Smith played in five NBA seasons, for the Mavericks (1991–95) and the Boston Celtics (1995–96) and averaged 8.0 ppg in his NBA career.

Drafted 6th overall in the 1991 NBA Draft, the Mavericks hoped Smith would compliment or eventually replace starting forward Roy Tarpley but Roy was banned by the NBA on October 17, 1991. However, Doug did not make the most of his opportunity: he missed his rookie training camp due to a contract dispute and did not sign his rookie contract until November 2, a day after the 1991-92 NBA season began.

His success in college didn't continue in the NBA: he was mired with foul trouble on the defensive end, didn't stay in shape, and was seen as a bust.

He was selected by the Toronto Raptors in the 1995 expansion draft, but was released before playing any games. On October 4, 1995, signed with the Boston Celtics. He lasted the entire season in Boston, appearing in just 17 games while averaging a new career low in points per game with 1.9. Doug was waived in July 1996 by the Celtics, ending his NBA career.

Smith won Continental Basketball Association (CBA) championships with the Oklahoma City Cavalry in 1997 and Quad City Thunder in 1998. He was named to the All-CBA Second Team in 1998.

== International career ==
Doug Smith also played for the US national team in the 1990 FIBA World Championship, winning the bronze medal.

== See also ==
- List of NCAA Division I men's basketball players with 2000 points and 1000 rebounds
