= San Diego Stingrays =

- League: IBL
- Founded: 1999
- Folded: 2001
- Arena: San Diego Sports Arena
- Capacity: 14,500
- Location: San Diego, California
- Team colors: purple, teal, black
- President: Ron Gross
- Ownership: Scott Atkins
- Website: www.iblhoops.com/tams/stingrays (archived on December 6, 2000)

The San Diego Stingrays were a basketball team based in San Diego, California, that competed as a charter member of International Basketball League (IBL). The team played its home games at the San Diego Sports Arena. It was owned by online sports gaming entrepreneur Scott Atkins.

== History ==
In June 1999, the Stingrays hired former San Diego State Aztecs men's basketball head coach Smokey Gaines as their head coach. Former National Basketball Association (NBA) player Jeff Malone was hired as Gaines' assistant coach in July 1999. Bill Tosheff was the director of basketball operations. Rapper Master P, who had previously played in the NBA pre-season, signed with the Stingrays in November 1999.

The Stingrays' first home game in 1999 was attended by 9,786 people—an IBL record.

The Stingrays had a dance team that participated in several community events. They were led by director Demilo Young and Sheila Christensen.

== See also ==
- San Diego Siege
- San Diego Surf
- San Diego Wildcards
