= Terdell Sands =

American football player (born 1979)

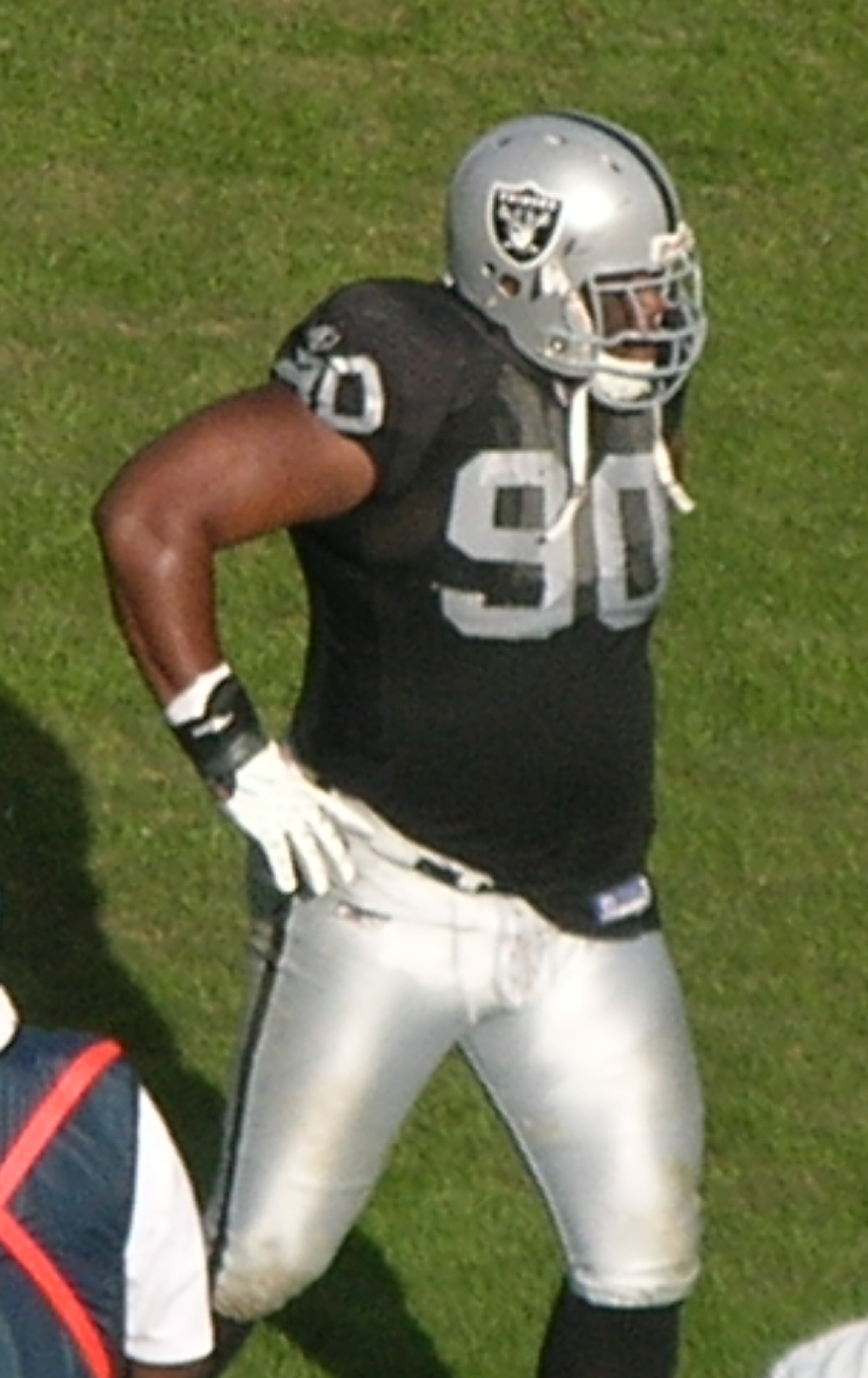
- Sands with the Oakland Raiders in 2008

No. 91, 78, 92, 90, 74
- Position: Defensive tackle

Personal information
- Born: October 31, 1979 (age 47); Chattanooga, Tennessee, U.S.
- Listed height: 6 ft 7 in (2.01 m)
- Listed weight: 335 lb (152 kg)

Career information
- High school: Howard (Chattanooga)
- College: Chattanooga
- NFL draft: 2001: 7th round, 243rd overall pick

Career history
- Kansas City Chiefs (2001–2002); Berlin Thunder (2002); Green Bay Packers (2002–2003); Oakland Raiders (2003–2008); New England Patriots (2009)

Career NFL statistics
- Total tackles: 131
- Sacks: 4
- Fumble recoveries: 2
- Pass deflections: 10
- Interceptions: 1
- Stats at Pro Football Reference

Terdell Sands (born October 31, 1979) is an American former professional football player who was a defensive tackle in the National Football League (NFL). He was selected by the Kansas City Chiefs in the seventh round of the 2001 NFL draft. He played college football for the Chattanooga Mocs.

Sands also played for the Green Bay Packers, Oakland Raiders, and New England Patriots.

== Early life ==
Sands played high school football at Howard High School in Chattanooga, Tennessee and was a four-year letterman in football and basketball. In football, as a defensive end, offensive tackle, and linebacker, he was a three-time All-City and a three-time All-State selection.

== College career ==
Sands only played one year of college football at the University of Tennessee at Chattanooga. During his only season, 1999, he played he totaled 36 tackles, one sack, and two fumble recoveries. He did not play in 2000.

== Professional career ==
=== Kansas City Chiefs ===
Sands was selected by the Kansas City Chiefs in the seventh round (243rd overall) of the 2001 NFL draft. He missed the entire season after being placed on the reserve/non-football injury list with a foot injury. After the season, he was allocated to the Berlin Thunder of NFL Europe, where he saw action in 10 games, picking up 14 tackles. He was waived by the Chiefs during final roster cutdowns before the 2002 season and re-signed to the team's practice squad on September 10. He was released from it on September 19.

=== Green Bay Packers ===
After being released from the Chiefs Sands was signed to the Green Bay Packers practice squad on November 20, 2002, where he spent the remainder of the season. He was re-signed by the Packers following the season. He was waived by the Packers on August 26, 2003, and re-signed to their practice squad on September 1. He was released from their practice squad on September 17, and re-signed to the practice squad on October 1. On October 16, 2003, he was promoted to the Packers' active roster. He played in one game before being waived on November 11, 2003.

=== Oakland Raiders ===
Sands was claimed off waivers by the Oakland Raiders on November 12, 2003. He played in three games (starting one) for the Raiders in the 2003 season, recording three tackles. He played in 15 games for the Raiders in 2004, picking up 22 tackles and two passes defensed on the year. He played in the final nine games of the 2005 season, recording 10 tackles and one sack.

For the Raiders in 2006, Sands played in 16 games, starting two, while recording a career-high 41 tackles, a sack, and his first career interception. Following the season, he was re-signed to a four-year, $17 million contract. He started 11 of 16 games played for the Raiders in 2007, picking up 23 tackles and no sacks. In 2008, he played in 16 games with no starts, recording 29 tackles and two sacks. Following a road win over the Denver Broncos on November 23, 2008, Sands punched Raiders punter Shane Lechler in the face on the team flight, but was neither fined nor suspended for the incident. In six years with the Raiders he started 14 of 75 games, recording 128 tackles, four sacks and an interception.

He was released on September 5, 2009, during final roster cutdowns.

=== New England Patriots ===
Sands signed with the New England Patriots on September 28, 2009. During his first week with the Patriots, Sands told the media he stood at 6-foot-8 and weighed 355 pounds. He was released by the team on October 14, after being active for one game.

== NFL career statistics ==
Legend
**Bold**	Career high

Year	Team	Games		Tackles					Interceptions					Fumbles			
Year	Team	GP	GS	Cmb	Solo	Ast	Sck	TFL	Int	Yds	TD	Lng	PD	FF	FR	Yds	TD
2003	GNB	1	0	1	1	0	0.0	0	0	0	0	0	0	0	0	0	0
2003	OAK	3	1	3	2	1	0.0	0	0	0	0	0	0	0	0	0	0
2004	OAK	15	0	22	17	5	0.0	1	0	0	0	0	2	0	0	0	0
2005	OAK	9	0	10	9	1	1.0	2	0	0	0	0	0	0	**1**	0	0
2006	OAK	**16**	2	**41**	**30**	**11**	1.0	**5**	**1**	**5**	0	**5**	**4**	0	0	0	0
2007	OAK	**16**	**11**	24	17	7	0.0	3	0	0	0	0	2	0	0	0	0
2008	OAK	**16**	0	29	19	10	**2.0**	3	0	0	0	0	2	0	**1**	0	0
2009	NWE	1	0	1	1	0	0.0	0	0	0	0	0	0	0	0	0	0
		77	14	131	96	35	4.0	14	1	5	0	5	10	0	2	0	0
