= Rashad Jones-Jennings =

American basketball player (born 1984)

Personal information
- Born: August 31, 1984 (age 42) Chattanooga, Tennessee, U.S.
- Listed height: 6 ft 8 in (2.03 m)
- Listed weight: 230 lb (104 kg)

Career information
- High school: Howard School (Chattanooga, Tennessee)
- College: Chattanooga State CC (2003–2005); Little Rock (2005–2007)
- NBA draft: 2007: undrafted
- Playing career: 2009–2014
- Position: Power forward / center

Career history
- 2009: Bayern Munich
- 2009–2010: Boulazac Basket Dordogne
- 2010: Soles de Mexicali
- 2010–2011: Pure-Youth Construction
- 2012: 9 de Julio de Río Tercero
- 2013: Singapore Slingers
- 2013–2014: Osorno Básquetbol
- 2014: Pioneros de Quintana Roo
- 2014: Titanes del Licey

Career highlights
- NCAA rebounding leader (2007); First-team All-Sun Belt (2007); Third-team NJCAA All-American (2005)

Rashad Jamal Jones-Jennings (born August 31, 1984) is an American retired professional basketball player.

== Early life ==
Jones-Jennings was born in Chattanooga, Tennessee to Valentina Jones and is one of five children, the other four are sisters. He attended Howard School of Academics and Technology. While playing for the school's basketball team, he helped guide them to three district championships, two regional championships and two appearances in the state tournament while averaging 10 points and 12 rebounds per game. He graduated in 2002 with a 3.3 GPA.

== College career ==
=== Chattanooga State CC ===
Rather than head right off to a four-year college or university out of high school, Jones-Jennings stayed in Chattanooga and attended Chattanooga State Community College (CSCC) for two years. As a 6 ft 8 in (2.03 m) power forward / center, he earned all-conference honors in both seasons. During his sophomore year, his final at CSCC, he averaged 16.3 points and 14.0 rebounds per game. His rebounding effort ranked second nationally. Jones-Jennings earned many accolades, including NJCAA Division I Third-Team All-American honors, the TJCAA and Eastern Division Most Valuable Player awards, as well as spots on the All-TJCAA and All-Eastern Division teams.

=== Arkansas–Little Rock ===
After a standout junior college career, Jones-Jennings was awarded an athletic scholarship to play basketball at the University of Arkansas at Little Rock. He spent his junior and senior seasons of NCAA eligibility playing for the Trojans. In his first season, he was dubbed the Sun Belt Conference Newcomer of the Year and a Third Team All-Conference selection after finishing the year ranked third nationally with 11.3 rebounds per game. This total also led the Sun Belt. On December 13, 2005 he became just the tenth NCAA Division I men's basketball player since 1973 to record 30 or more rebounds in a single game. He grabbed exactly 30 rebounds against in-state rival Arkansas–Pine Bluff. He was the first Division I player in six years and just the second since 1994 to accomplish the feat. Jones-Jennings had a great all-around impact in his first season at UALR as he led the team in rebounding, minutes played, minutes per game, blocked shots, total points, field goals made, free throws made and free throw attempts.

Entering his final college season in 2006–07, he was only one of eight returning players nationally to have averaged a double-double the year before. He also returned as the nation's top rebounder. Although the Trojans did not qualify for a postseason tournament in either of his two seasons, Jones-Jennings did garner much personal success, especially in his senior season. For the year, he recorded 18 double-doubles, 24 double-digit rebounding efforts and had three games with 20 or more rebounds, including a 25-point, 20-rebound performance against Texas State. He led Division I in rebounding on the year while averaging 13.1 per game in 30 games played. He was also a First Team All-Conference selection as he would go on to finish his Division I career with 731 points and 475 rebounds in 59 career games.

== Professional career ==
Jones-Jennings was not selected in the 2007 NBA draft. He played for the Philadelphia 76ers in that summer's Las Vegas Summer League but did not make the final regular season roster. He then signed with Ago Rethimno Almeco in Greece in December, but ultimately did not play a game for them the entire season. Over the next two and a half years, Jones-Jennings became somewhat of a journeyman, playing professionally for teams in Germany, France and Mexico before ending up with Pure-Youth Construction in the Super Basketball League of Taiwan in December 2010. He signed with Osorno Básquetbol of the Chilean Liga Nacional Movistar for the 2013–14 season.

== See also ==
- List of NCAA Division I men's basketball players with 30 or more rebounds in a game
- List of NCAA Division I men's basketball season rebounding leaders
