= Howard School of Academics and Technology =

The Howard School
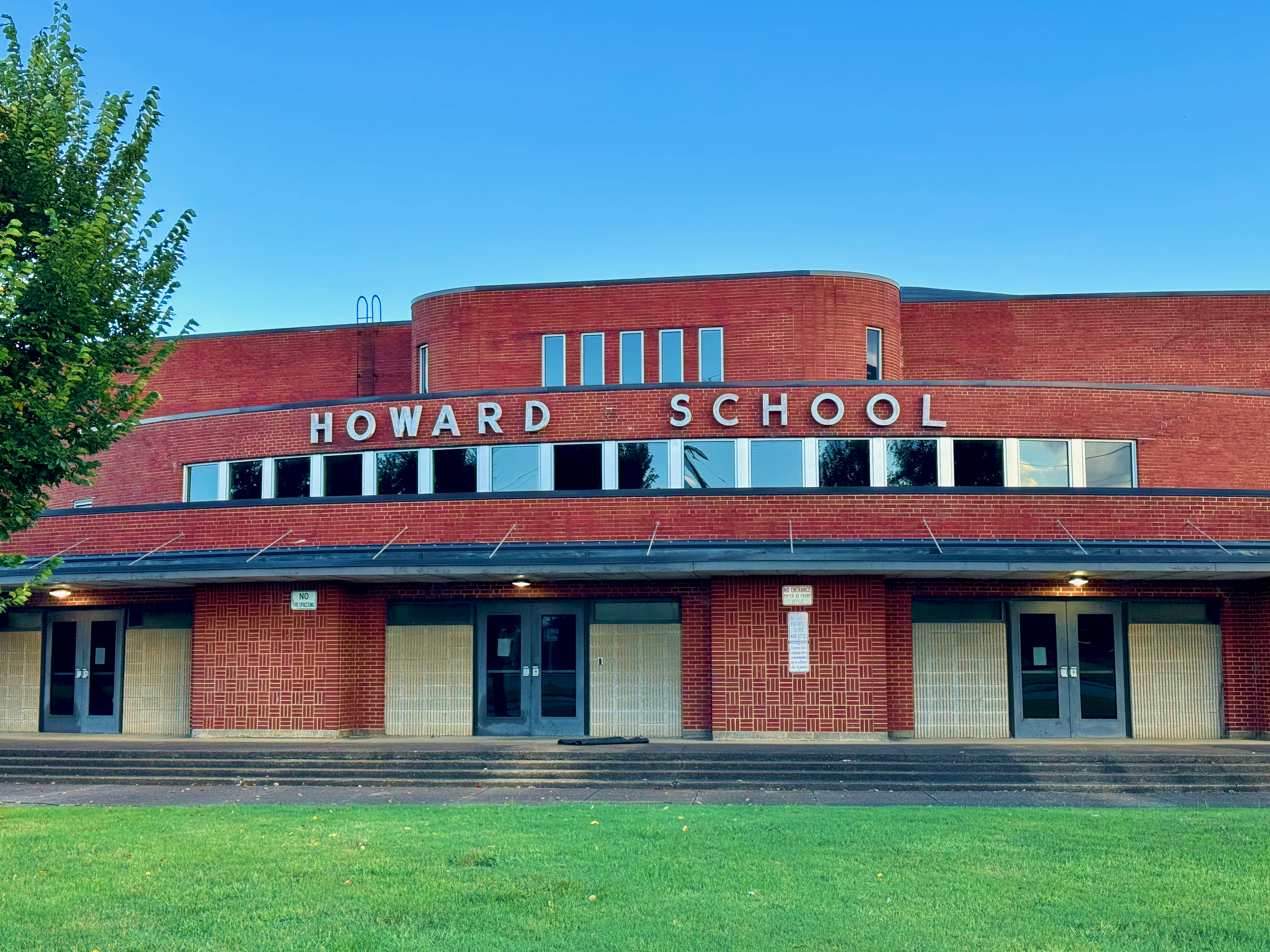

Location
- 2500 Market Street; Chattanooga, Tennessee; United States; 35.026°N 85.310°W

Information
- Type: Public co-educational secondary
- Established: 1865
- Principal: Leandrea Ware
- Teaching staff: 160 teachers
- Grades: 9-12
- Enrollment: 1213
- Colors: Maroon and Gold
- Athletics: Football, volleyball, basketball, baseball, soccer, track and field, wrestling, softball, cheerleading
- Mascot: Hustlin' Tiger
- Rivals: Brainerd High School, Tyner Academy, East Ridge High School
- Website: howard.hcde.org

Howard School of Academics and Technology is a co-educational public school in Chattanooga, Tennessee. Dr. Leandrea Ware is currently the Executive Principal, while Dr. Renneisen, Dr. Mitchell, Mr. Carrillo, Mrs. Farr, and Ms. Fulton are the Assistant Principals.

== History ==
Howard was the first public school in the Chattanooga area. The name is drawn from Civil War General Oliver O. Howard, as is Howard University. The school was founded under the leadership of Reverend E. O. Tade. Reverend Tade worked extensively in establishing a ministry in the Chattanooga region, being employed by the American Missionary Association and the Freedman's Aid Commission. His work began as an outreach to local ministries and broadened to beginning Howard School in 1865.

== Academics ==
Howard school is split up into four academies. First, there is the 9th Grade Academy, in which all freshmen are automatically placed. At the end of a student's freshman year, they are required to pick an academy. They may choose between an Engineering/Vocational-focused academy, an IT-focused academy, or a Health/Human Services academy. Howard was the home of Johnny Taylor, Terdell Sands and Reggie White.

== Sports ==
The Howard Tigers Basketball team has twice appeared in the Tennessee State Championship for their division, in 2007 and 2008. Both times they reached the State Semi-Finals.

This past season in 2008-09 the Howard Hustlin Tigers football team went 9-1 winning the regional championship. The senior players learned from Head Coach Alvin Tarver, and former players such as Tremaine "Busta" Hudson, Rico Council, Michael Ford, Corey Williams, Clifford Stone, and many more.

Noteworthy Sports Accomplishments:

Football: State Champions 1959, 1961 and 1962; co-champions 1957 and 1963; District Champions 2008

Basketball Males: State Champions 1957; State Runners-up 1972 and 1980

Track and Field: State Champions (Males) 1957 and 1959; State Champions (Females) 1959, 1984 and 2009; State Runners-up (1980)

== Band ==
In the past, Howard was known in Chattanooga for their 'Marching 100'. Howard is a frequent performer in City Parades and events, such as the East Side Mardi Gras Parade and Chattanooga's Battle of the Bands. 1963–1973 the "Marching 100" participated in the Peach Bowl in Atlanta, GA. The Band won a classical concert in 1968–1970.

== Notable alumni ==
- Rashad Jones-Jennings, professional basketball player
- Joyce Mathis, soprano
- Terdell Sands - professional football player
- Johnny Taylor – Chattanooga Mocs and National Basketball Association player
- Reggie White – football star and Hall of Fame member

== Documentary Film: "Build Me a World" ==
On August 16, 2012, the Tivoli Theater in Chattanooga was packed for the premiere of a documentary on the Howard School entitled "Build Me a World." The film was created by Fancy Rhino with funding from a MakeWork grant and private gifts through the Ceros Fund. The experiences of three seniors through their final year at Howard comprise the storyline. "Build Me a World" was produced to call attention to the school's historical significance as one of the oldest public schools for African-Americans in the US (1865), to the turnaround in the graduation rate from 20% to 88% over the last six years, and to the particular needs of the school for help as it seeks to prepare students from difficult circumstances for better academic and professional opportunities in the future. Over 90% of the student body lives in poverty, and incoming freshmen typically enter with a third-grade reading level. Students were not only subjects in the project but also participated in the filming process.
