= List of NCAA Division I men's basketball players with 30 or more rebounds in a game =

In basketball, a rebound is the act of gaining possession of the ball after an unsuccessful field goal or free throw. Players on this list have all recorded 30 or more rebounds in a single game. The NCAA did not split into its current divisions format until August 1973. From 1906 to 1955, there were no classifications to the NCAA nor its predecessor, the Intercollegiate Athletic Association of the United States (IAAUS). Then, from 1956 to 1973, colleges were classified as either "NCAA University Division (Major College)" or "NCAA College Division (Small College)". Additionally, the NCAA recognizes two different eras in college basketball history when it comes to the statistic of rebounding: the pre-1973 era and the post-1973 era. In the pre-1973 era (otherwise known as the era before the divisional setup), opponents may have been less talented and from smaller schools (such as the National Association of Intercollegiate Athletics [NAIA] or Divisions II and III in today's classification). Although the 1972–73 season was before the divisional split, the NCAA officially considers that season to be "post-1973" because of the adoption of freshman eligibility for varsity play in all NCAA sports effective in August 1972. Therefore, the all-time single game rebound record is 51, set by Bill Chambers of William & Mary in 1953. Chambers' 51-rebound effort contributed to a Virginia state record of 100 team rebounds by the Tribe against UVA. The post-1973 era record is 35, set by Fresno State's Larry Abney on February 17, 2000. Abney's modern-day record has never seen any real challenge to be broken; the closest another player has come were 30-rebound efforts by Rashad Jones-Jennings of Arkansas–Little Rock in 2005 and Kendall Gray of Delaware State in 2015.

Seven players on this list have been enshrined into the Naismith Memorial Basketball Hall of Fame: Elgin Baylor, Wilt Chamberlain, Dave DeBusschere, Artis Gilmore, Tom Heinsohn, Bailey Howell and Maurice Stokes. John Tresvant of Seattle, who recorded 40 rebounds on February 8, 1963, claims that he finished the game against Montana with more: "Actually, I had 44 (rebounds). I know I got more when I went back over the game. The guy keeping the stats told me later he didn't mark them all down."

If true, this would have placed Tresvant second all-time for rebounds in a game, but still well behind Chambers' mark. Among players on the list, only one freshman has officially recorded 30 or more rebounds. Durand "Rudy" Macklin of LSU set the school record as a freshman on November 26, 1976, when he grabbed 32 rebounds against Tulane. Robert Parish of Centenary, also a Hall of Famer, had one performance that would have made him the first freshman to record 30 or more rebounds; he collected 33 against Southern Mississippi on January 27, 1973. However, due to sanctions related to Parish's recruitment, the NCAA omitted all Centenary games and statistics from its official records starting with his freshman year of 1972–73 and continuing through the 1977–78 season, two years after Parish's graduation.

== Key ==
Pos.	G	F	C	Ref.
Position	Guard	Forward	Center	Reference(s)

Class (Cl.) key
Fr	Freshman	So	Sophomore	Jr	Junior	Sr	Senior

*	Elected to the Naismith Memorial Basketball Hall of Fame
Player (X)	Denotes the number of times the player appears on the list
Italics	Performance not officially recognized due to NCAA sanctions

== Dates of 30+ rebounds ==
=== Pre-1973 era ===
Note: Since there were so many occurrences of individual players grabbing 30+ rebounds during the pre-1973 college basketball era, the official NCAA men's basketball media guide cut the list off at some of the instances of 34 rebounds and more. This list, therefore, is not comprehensive, but the post-1973 era list is.

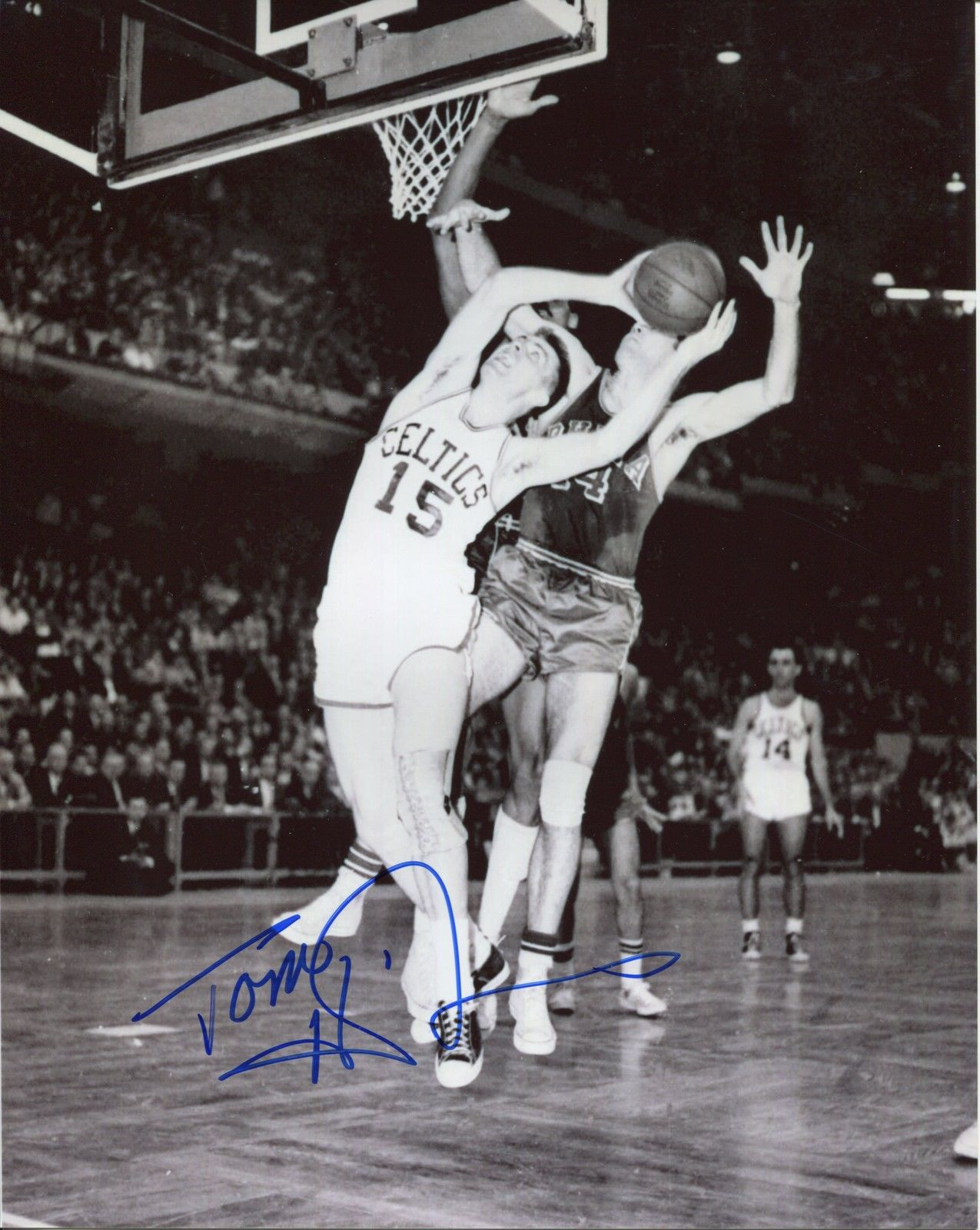
Tom Heinsohn once recorded 42 rebounds.

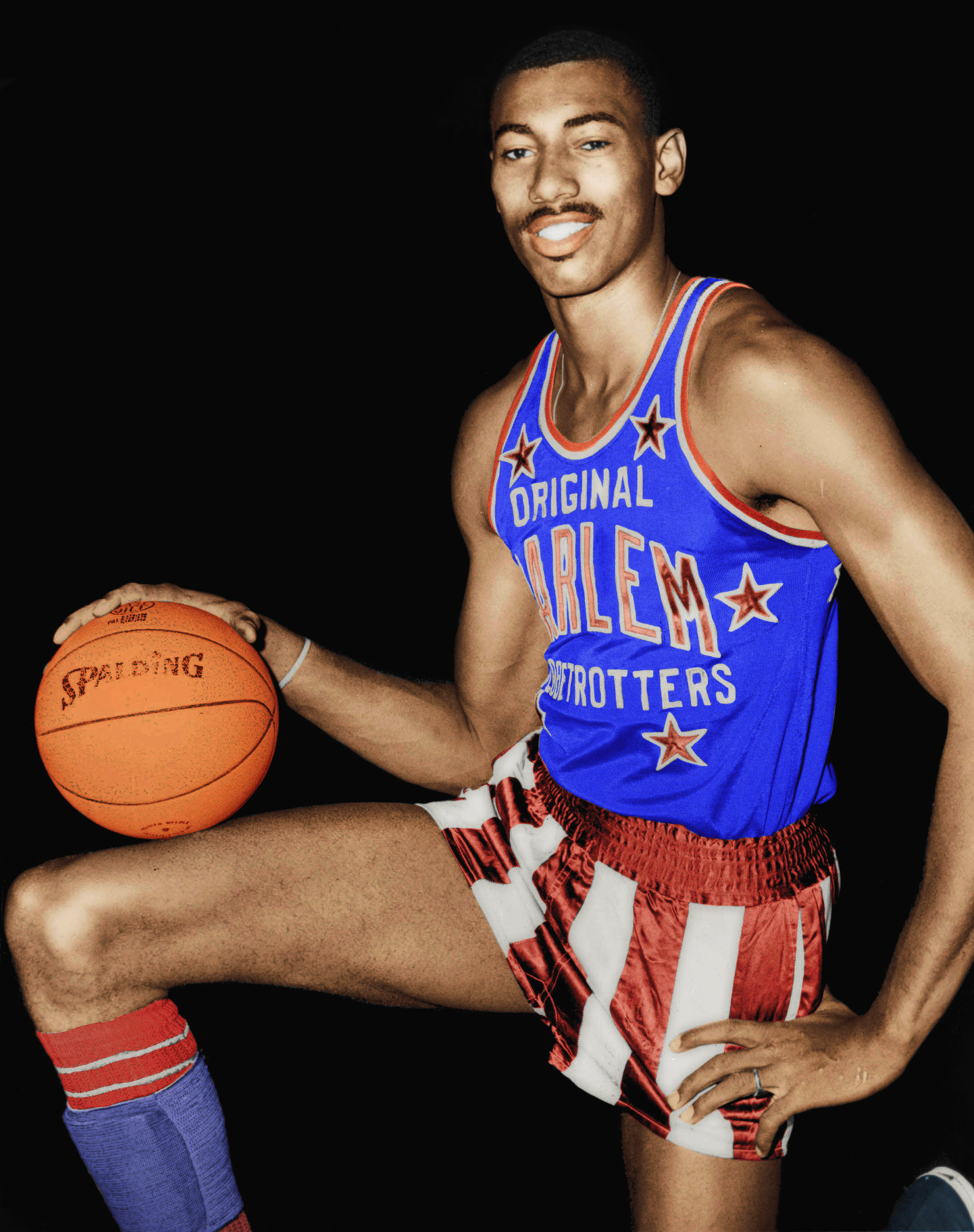
Wilt Chamberlain's career high was 36 rebounds.

Rebounds	Player	Pos.	Cl.	Team	Opponent	Date	Ref.
51	Bill Chambers	C	Sr	William & Mary	Virginia	February 14, 1953	
43	Charlie Slack	F	So	Marshall	Morris Harvey	January 12, 1954	
42	Tom Heinsohn*	F/C	Jr	Holy Cross	Boston College	March 1, 1955	
40	Art Quimby	C	Sr	Connecticut	Boston University	January 11, 1955	
40	John Tresvant	F/C	Jr	Seattle	Montana	February 8, 1963	
39	Dave DeBusschere*	F	So	Detroit	Central Michigan	January 30, 1960	
39	Maurice Stokes*	C	Sr	Saint Francis (PA)	John Carroll	January 28, 1955	
39	Keith Swagerty	F/C	So	Pacific	UC Santa Barbara	March 5, 1965	
38	Steve Hamilton	F	Jr	Morehead State	Florida State	January 2, 1957	
38	Jerry Koch	F	Jr	Saint Louis	Bradley	March 5, 1954	
38	Paul Silas	F	So	Creighton	Centenary	February 19, 1962	
38	Charlie Tyra	C/F	Jr	Louisville	Canisius	December 10, 1955	
38	Tommy Woods	F	So	East Tennessee State	Middle Tennessee	March 1, 1965	
37 ^{(NIT)}	Al Inniss	F	Jr	St. Francis Brooklyn	Lafayette	March 17, 1956	
37	Elgin Baylor*	F	Jr	Seattle	Pacific Lutheran	February 28, 1958	
36	Jim Barnes	C	Sr	UTEP	Western New Mexico	January 4, 1964	
36	Wilt Chamberlain*	C	Jr	Kansas	Iowa State	February 15, 1958	
36	Swede Halbrook	C	So	Oregon State	Idaho	February 15, 1955	
36	Dickie Hemric	C	Sr	Wake Forest	Clemson	February 4, 1955	
36	Herb Neff	F	Sr	Tennessee	Georgia Tech	January 26, 1952	
36	Paul Silas (2)	F	Jr	Creighton	Marquette	January 23, 1964	
35	Bill Ebben	G/F	Jr	Detroit	BYU	December 28, 1955	
35	Don Lange	F	Jr	Navy	Loyola (MD)	February 18, 1953	
35	Ronnie Shavlik	C	Sr	NC State	Villanova	January 29, 1955	
34	Bob Burrow	F	Sr	Kentucky	Temple	December 10, 1955	
34 ^{(NCAAT)}	Fred Cohen	F/C	Sr	Temple	Connecticut	March 16, 1956	
34	Artis Gilmore*	C	Sr	Jacksonville	Saint Peter's	December 3, 1970	
34	Bailey Howell*	F	So	Mississippi State	LSU	February 1, 1957	
34	Cal Ramsey	F	So	NYU	Boston College	February 16, 1957	
34	Ronnie Shavlik (2)	C	Sr	NC State	South Carolina	February 11, 1955	

=== Post-1973 era ===
Rebounds	Player	Pos.	Cl.	Team	Opponent	Date	Ref.
35	Larry Abney	F	Sr	Fresno State	SMU	February 17, 2000	
34	David Vaughn, Jr.	C	So	Oral Roberts	Brandeis	January 8, 1973	
33	Robert Parish*	C	Fr	Centenary	Southern Miss	January 27, 1973	
32	Durand Macklin	F	Fr	LSU	Tulane	November 26, 1976	
32	Jervaughn Scales	F	Sr	Southern	Grambling State	February 7, 1994	
31	Jim Bradley	C	Sr	Northern Illinois	Milwaukee	February 19, 1973	
31	Calvin Natt	F	So	Northeast Louisiana	Georgia Southern	December 29, 1976	
30	Marvin Barnes	F	Jr	Providence	Assumption	February 3, 1973	
30	Monti Davis	F	Jr	Tennessee State	Alabama State	February 8, 1979	
30	Kendall Gray	C	Sr	Delaware State	Coppin State	March 5, 2015	
30	Rashad Jones-Jennings	F/C	Jr	Little Rock	Arkansas–Pine Bluff	December 13, 2005	
30	Brad Robinson	F	So	Kent State	Central Michigan	February 9, 1974	

== See also ==
- List of National Basketball Association players with most rebounds in a game
