= Bernie Bickerstaff =

American basketball coach and executive (born 1944)

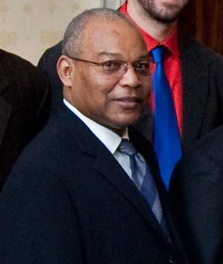
- Bickerstaff visits the White House with the Chicago Bulls in February 2009, before the Bulls' game against the Washington Wizards.

Detroit Pistons
- Position: Sr. Basketball Advisor
- League: NBA

Personal information
- Born: February 11, 1944 (age 82) Benham, Kentucky, U.S.
- Listed height: 6 ft 3 in (1.91 m)
- Listed weight: 185 lb (84 kg)

Career information
- High school: East Benham (Benham, Kentucky)
- College: Rio Grande CC (1961–1962); San Diego (1964–1966)
- Coaching career: 1968–2014

Career history

Coaching
- 1968–1969: San Diego (assistant)
- 1969–1973: San Diego
- 1973–1985: Capital/Washington Bullets (assistant)
- 1985–1990: Seattle SuperSonics
- 1994–1996: Denver Nuggets
- 1996–1999: Washington Bullets/Wizards
- 1999–2001: St. Louis Swarm
- 2004–2007: Charlotte Bobcats
- 2008–2010: Chicago Bulls (assistant)
- 2010–2012: Portland Trail Blazers (assistant)
- 2012–2013: Los Angeles Lakers (assistant)
- 2012: Los Angeles Lakers (interim)
- 2013–2014: Cleveland Cavaliers (assistant)

Career highlights
- As head coach: Chuck Daly Lifetime Achievement Award (2014); As assistant coach: NBA champion (1978); As executive: NBA champion (2016)

Career coaching record
- NBA: 419–518 (.447)
- Record at Basketball Reference

Bernard Tyrone Bickerstaff (born February 11, 1944) is an American basketball coach and front office executive, currently serving as the Senior Basketball Advisor for the Detroit Pistons. As a coach, he previously worked as the head coach for the NBA's Seattle SuperSonics, Denver Nuggets, Washington Bullets/Wizards, Charlotte Bobcats, and Los Angeles Lakers. He has also been an assistant for the Portland Trail Blazers, Chicago Bulls, Los Angeles Lakers, and Cleveland Cavaliers. He has served in numerous other NBA front office positions, and has been a consultant for the Harlem Globetrotters.

== Early years ==
Bickerstaff was born in Benham, Kentucky, where his father and grandfather worked in the coal mines. He often had to endure open racism. He attended East Benham High School, where he was the starting point guard of the basketball team.

After graduating in 1961, Bickerstaff moved to Cleveland where he had relatives, with the idea of joining the Army, but he instead accepted a basketball scholarship to play for Rio Grande College. The racial tension he experienced during his time playing there made him leave school early and head back to Cleveland to work in a steel mill. However, the difficult working conditions prompted him to accept a second opportunity to play college basketball at the University of San Diego from 1964 to 1966. As a senior, he was named team captain and MVP, when the Toreros finished 17–11 and went on to play at the Small College Regional Playoffs. He is a member of the Kappa Alpha Psi fraternity.

== Professional career ==
After finishing his college eligibility, Bickerstaff was hired by his coach Phil Woolpert to serve as an assistant for the 1968–69 season. After three seasons at 25 years old, he was named the head coach of the University of San Diego after Woolpert's abrupt resignation, keeping this position for the next four years. In 1972–1973 his team finished 19–9 and his four-year overall record was 54–49.

In 1973, Bickerstaff was hired as an assistant for the Washington Bullets by then coach K. C. Jones and was a part of the 1978 Bullets NBA Championship. He left the team after 12 seasons to become head coach of the Seattle SuperSonics. Lenny Wilkens, who had been elevated from coach to GM in 1985, hired Bickerstaff for the head coaching position to replace himself. Bickerstaff was head coach of the Sonics from 1985 to 1990, with the team reaching the Western Conference Finals in 1987.

Bickerstaff was the Denver Nuggets' president and general manager from 1990 to 1997. It was he who fired popular head coach Doug Moe in late 1990; he had gone 432–357 as a coach for Denver. Bickerstaff also coached the team from 1994 to 1996.

In 1997, Wes Unseld hired Bickerstaff to coach the Bullets, making the playoffs for the first time since 1988 and becoming the league's all-time 34th-winningest coach. After parting ways with the team in 1999, he had a two-year stint with the International Basketball League's St. Louis Swarm. Bickerstaff was twice named IBL Coach of the Year.

In 2003, Bickerstaff was hired by Ed Tapscott to become the expansion Charlotte Bobcats' first head coach and general manager.

Bickerstaff was hired by the Los Angeles Lakers in 2012–13 as an assistant coach to Mike Brown. On November 9, 2012, Bickerstaff was named interim head coach of the Lakers after Brown was fired after 5 games, going 1–4 in those games. Three days later, the Lakers signed former Knicks coach Mike D'Antoni as their official head coach, although D'Antoni's on-court debut was delayed as he recovered from knee-replacement surgery. Bickerstaff continued to coach the Lakers in D'Antoni's absence, ending his stint with a 4–1 record, the highest winning percentage in Lakers' history, albeit in only five games. He continued with the team as an assistant coach, but was fired after the season.

In the summer of 2013, Bickerstaff became an assistant coach with the Cleveland Cavaliers. The following year, he moved up to the Cavaliers' front office, serving as a senior advisor. As a member of the Cavaliers front office, he was part of Cleveland's 2016 NBA Championship team.

In the summer of 2025, a year after his son, NBA head coach J. B. Bickerstaff, was fired from his head coaching position with the Cleveland Cavaliers, followed by his subsequent arrival to coach the Detroit Pistons, the elder Bickerstaff was brought on as an advisor to the staff.

== Head coaching record ==
=== NBA ===
Legend
Regular season	G	Games coached	W	Games won	L	Games lost	W–L %	Win–loss %
Playoffs	PG	Playoff games	PW	Playoff wins	PL	Playoff losses	PW–L %	Playoff win–loss %

Team	Year	G	W	L	W–L%	Finish	PG	PW	PL	PW–L%	Result
Seattle	1985–86	82	31	51	.378	5th in Pacific	—	—	—	—	Missed Playoffs
Seattle	1986–87	82	39	43	.476	4th in Pacific	14	7	7	.500	Lost in Conf. Finals
Seattle	1987–88	82	44	38	.537	3rd in Pacific	5	2	3	.400	Lost in First round
Seattle	1988–89	82	47	35	.573	3rd in Pacific	8	3	5	.375	Lost in Conf. Semifinals
Seattle	1989–90	82	41	41	.500	4th in Pacific	—	—	—	—	Missed Playoffs
Denver	1994–95	32	20	12	.625	4th in Midwest	3	0	3	.000	Lost in First round
Denver	1995–96	82	35	47	.427	4th in Midwest	—	—	—	—	Missed Playoffs
Denver	1996–97	13	4	9	.308	(fired)	—	—	—	—	Missed Playoffs
Washington	1996–97	35	22	13	.628	4th in Atlantic	3	0	3	.000	Lost in First round
Washington	1997–98	82	42	40	.512	4th in Atlantic	—	—	—	—	Missed Playoffs
Washington	1998–99	50	18	32	.360	6th in Atlantic	—	—	—	—	Missed Playoffs
Charlotte	2004–05	82	18	64	.220	4th in Southeast	—	—	—	—	Missed Playoffs
Charlotte	2005–06	82	26	56	.317	4th in Southeast	—	—	—	—	Missed Playoffs
Charlotte	2006–07	82	33	49	.402	4th in Southeast	—	—	—	—	Missed Playoffs
L.A. Lakers	2012–13	5	4	1	.800	(interim)	—	—	—	—	—
Career		937	419	518	.447		33	12	21	.364	

== Awards and accolades ==
- In 1987, he received the Horace Mann Award for Leadership and was also named the 1987 Sports Person of the Year, presented by the New York Pro-Am Basketball Association.
- In 1995, he was inducted into the University of San Diego's Hall of Fame.
- Inducted into the West Coast Conference's inaugural Hall of Honor.
- In 2010, he was inducted into the John McClendon Minority Athletics Administrators Hall of Fame.
- In 2011, he was named a Kappa Legend and Icon in Sports.
- In 2012, he was inducted into the Breitbard Hall of Fame.
- His hometown of Benham, Kentucky, named a street – Bernard Bickerstaff Boulevard – in his honor.
- In 2014, he was awarded the NBA's Chuck Daly Lifetime Achievement Award.

== Personal life ==
Bickerstaff also worked as a TV and radio analyst with the Washington Wizards, San Antonio Spurs, NBA.com and the Sporting News Radio. His son, J. B. Bickerstaff, is the head coach of the Detroit Pistons. His wife Eugenia is retired. He has two other sons, Bernard Jr. and Tim, and two daughters, Cydni and Robin.
