= Bryce Notree =

American gridiron football player (born 1998)

No. 44, 41, 54
- Position: Linebacker

Personal information
- Born: October 1, 1998 (age 28); Arlington, Texas, U.S.
- Listed height: 6 ft 3 in (1.91 m)
- Listed weight: 225 lb (102 kg)

Career information
- High school: Lamar (Arlington, TX)
- College: Southern Illinois
- NFL draft: 2022: undrafted

Career history
- 2022: Washington Commanders*
- 2023–2024: Montreal Alouettes
- 2024: Winnipeg Blue Bombers
- * Offseason or practice squad member only

Awards and highlights
- Grey Cup champion (2023); Second-team All-MVFC (2021)
- Stats at CFL.ca

Bryce Notree (born October 1, 1998) is an American former professional football linebacker who played in the Canadian Football League (CFL) with the Montreal Alouettes and Winnipeg Blue Bombers. He played college football for the Southern Illinois Salukis.

== Early life ==
Notree played high school football at Lamar High School in Arlington, Texas. He was named all-district at defensive end in 2014 and 2015. He also played basketball in high school.

== College career ==
Notree played college football at Southern Illinois from 2017 to 2021 as a linebacker. He redshirted in 2016.

He played in 10 games in 2017, recording 11 tackles. He started 11 games in 2018, totaling 78 tackles, two sacks, two interceptions and three pass breakups, earning honorable mention All-Missouri Valley Football Conference (MVFC) honors. Notree only played in 2 games in 2019 due to injuries. He started 10 games in 2020, recording 63 tackles and garnering honorable mention All-MVFC recognition for the second consecutive year.

Notree started 13 games in 2021, accumulating 91 tackles, four sacks and two interceptions, earning second team All-MVFC honors.

== Professional career ==
=== Washington Commanders ===
Notree signed with the Washington Commanders of the National Football League (NFL) on May 16, 2022, after going undrafted in the 2022 NFL draft. He was released on August 7, 2022.

=== Montreal Alouettes ===
Notree signed with the Montreal Alouettes of the Canadian Football League (CFL) on January 13, 2023. He was moved between the practice roster, active roster and injured reserve several times during the 2023 season. Overall, he dressed in 10 games, starting two, in 2023, recording 22 tackles on defense, 11 special teams tackles and one sack. He was on the injured list when the Alouettes won the 110th Grey Cup, defeating the Winnipeg Blue Bombers by a score of 28–24.

During training camp for the 2024 season, Notree was released on May 11, 2024. However, on July 20, 2024, it was announced that Notree had re-signed with the Alouettes. He played in four regular season games where he recorded one special teams tackle, but was released again on September 16, 2024.

=== Winnipeg Blue Bombers ===
Notree was signed to the practice roster of the Winnipeg Blue Bombers of the CFL on October 8, 2024. He was promoted to the active roster two days later, and dressed in one game before being moved back to the practice roster on October 24.

== Personal life ==
Notree is the son of former basketball player Bryant Notree.
