= 1994–95 Golden State Warriors season =

American basketball team season

- Head coach: Don Nelson (resigned); Bob Lanier (interim)
- General manager: Don Nelson (until Feb. 13); Ed Gregory
- Owner: Chris Cohan
- Arena: Oakland-Alameda County Coliseum Arena

Results
- Record: 26–56 (.317)
- Place: Division: 6th (Pacific); Conference: 11th (Western)
- Playoff finish: Did not qualify
- Stats at Basketball Reference

Local media
- Television: KPIX-TV; KICU-TV; SportsChannel Pacific
- Radio: KNBR

The 1994–95 Golden State Warriors season was the 49th season for the Golden State Warriors in the National Basketball Association, and their 33rd season in the San Francisco Bay Area.

== Season summary ==
=== Off-season ===
During the off-season, the Warriors acquired Ricky Pierce, and rookie power forward, and first-round draft pick Carlos Rogers out of Tennessee State University from the Seattle SuperSonics. Shortly before the start of the regular season, the team acquired Rony Seikaly from the Miami Heat.

=== Regular season ===
Second-year star Chris Webber sat out early into the regular season, and exercised his option to become a restricted free agent, claiming irreconcilable differences with head coach and General Manager Don Nelson. Webber and Nelson both feuded with each other during the previous season, and Webber asked to be traded; the Warriors dealt him to the Washington Bullets in exchange for Tom Gugliotta in November.

With the addition of Seikaly, Gugliotta and Pierce, along with the return of All-Star guard Tim Hardaway, who missed all of the previous season due to a knee injury, the Warriors won their first five games of the regular season, and posted an 8–5 record in November. However, the team soon struggled losing 18 of their next 20 games, posting ten and eight-game losing streaks respectively, as Pierce, Seikaly and Chris Mullin all missed large parts of the season due to injuries. All of this led to the resignation of Nelson, after a 14–31 record at the All-Star break. At mid-season, the team traded Gugliotta to the Minnesota Timberwolves in exchange for rookie small forward, and first-round draft pick Donyell Marshall from the University of Connecticut. Under Nelson's replacement, retired All-Star center and Hall of Famer Bob Lanier as an interim coach, the Warriors finished in sixth place in the Pacific Division with a disappointing 26–56 record.

Latrell Sprewell averaged 20.6 points, 4.0 assists and 1.6 steals per game, while Hardaway averaged 20.1 points, 9.3 assists and 1.4 steals per game, and led the Warriors with 168 three-point field goals, Mullin provided the team with 19.0 points, 5.0 assists and 1.5 steals per game in 25 games, and Marshall contributed 14.8 points and 6.5 rebounds per game in 32 games after the trade, and was named to the NBA All-Rookie Second Team. In addition, Seikaly provided with 12.1 points and 7.4 rebounds per game in 36 games, while Pierce contributed 12.5 points per game off the bench in 27 games, and Chris Gatling provided with 13.7 points and 7.6 rebounds per game, while shooting .633 in field-goal percentage. Meanwhile, Victor Alexander averaged 10.0 points and 5.8 rebounds per game, Rogers averaged 8.9 points and 5.7 rebounds per game in only just 49 games, Keith Jennings contributed 7.4 points and 4.7 assists per game, and top draft pick Clifford Rozier provided with 6.8 points and 7.4 rebounds per game.

During the NBA All-Star weekend at the America West Arena in Phoenix, Arizona, Sprewell was selected for the 1995 NBA All-Star Game, as a member of the Western Conference All-Star team, while Rozier was selected for the NBA Rookie Game, as a member of the White team. Before the mid-season trade, Marshall also participated in the Rookie Game as part of the White team, while playing for the Timberwolves. Gatling finished in eighth place in Sixth Man of the Year voting, and also finished tied in ninth place in Most Improved Player voting.

The Warriors finished 19th in the NBA in home-game attendance, with an attendance of 616,025 at the Oakland-Alameda County Coliseum Arena during the regular season.

=== Aftermath ===
Following the season, Pierce signed as a free agent with the Indiana Pacers, while Rogers and Alexander were both traded to the Toronto Raptors expansion team, Jennings was left unprotected in the 1995 NBA expansion draft, where he was selected by the Raptors, and Lanier was fired as head coach.

== Draft picks ==
Round	Pick	Player	Position	Nationality	College / Team
1	16	Clifford Rozier	C	United States	Louisville
2	39	Anthony Miller	PF	United States	Michigan State
2	45	Dwayne Morton	SG	United States	Louisville

== Roster ==
1994–95 Golden State Warriors roster
Players

Pos.	No.	Player	Height	Weight	DOB	From
C	52	Victor Alexander (injured)	6 ft 9 in (2.06 m)	265 lb (120 kg)	1969–08–31	Iowa State
F	25	Chris Gatling	6 ft 10 in (2.08 m)	220 lb (100 kg)	1967–09–03	Old Dominion
G	10	Tim Hardaway (injured)	6 ft 0 in (1.83 m)	175 lb (79 kg)	1966–09–01	UTEP
G	2	Keith Jennings	5 ft 7 in (1.70 m)	160 lb (73 kg)	1968–11–02	East Tennessee State
G	20	Tim Legler	6 ft 4 in (1.93 m)	200 lb (91 kg)	1966–12–26	La Salle
G	9	Ryan Lorthridge	6 ft 4 in (1.93 m)	190 lb (86 kg)	1972–07–27	Jackson State
F	3	Donyell Marshall	6 ft 9 in (2.06 m)	218 lb (99 kg)	1973–04–18	Connecticut
G	50	Dwayne Morton	6 ft 7 in (2.01 m)	195 lb (88 kg)	1971–08–08	Louisville
F	17	Chris Mullin	6 ft 6 in (1.98 m)	200 lb (91 kg)	1963–07–30	St. John's
G	22	Ricky Pierce (injured)	6 ft 4 in (1.93 m)	205 lb (93 kg)	1959–08–19	Rice
F	34	Carlos Rogers	6 ft 11 in (2.11 m)	220 lb (100 kg)	1971–02–06	Tennessee State
C	44	Clifford Rozier	6 ft 11 in (2.11 m)	245 lb (111 kg)	1972–10–31	Louisville
C	4	Rony Seikaly	6 ft 11 in (2.11 m)	230 lb (104 kg)	1965–05–10	Syracuse
G	15	Latrell Sprewell	6 ft 5 in (1.96 m)	190 lb (86 kg)	1970–09–08	Alabama
F	12	David Wood	6 ft 9 in (2.06 m)	227 lb (103 kg)	1964–11–30	Nevada

Coaches
Head coach
- Bob Lanier (interim)
Assistant(s)
- Al Attles
- Rod Higgins

Legend
- (DP) Unsigned draft pick
- (FA) Free agent
- (S) Suspended
- Injured

== Regular season ==
=== Season standings ===
Pacific Division	W	L	PCT	GB	Home	Road	Div
y-Phoenix Suns	59	23	.720	—	32–9	27–14	23–7
x-Seattle SuperSonics	57	25	.695	2	32–9	25–16	16–14
x-Los Angeles Lakers	48	34	.585	11	29–12	19–22	15–15
x-Portland Trail Blazers	44	38	.537	15	26–15	18–23	17–13
Sacramento Kings	39	43	.476	20	27–14	12–29	17–13
Golden State Warriors	26	56	.317	33	15–26	11–30	11–19
Los Angeles Clippers	17	65	.207	42	13–28	4–37	6–24

#	Western Conference				
#	Team	W	L	PCT	GB
1	z-San Antonio Spurs	62	20	.756	–
2	y-Phoenix Suns	59	23	.720	3
3	x-Utah Jazz	60	22	.732	2
4	x-Seattle SuperSonics	57	25	.695	5
5	x-Los Angeles Lakers	48	34	.585	14
6	x-Houston Rockets	47	35	.573	15
7	x-Portland Trail Blazers	44	38	.537	18
8	x-Denver Nuggets	41	41	.500	21
9	Sacramento Kings	39	43	.476	23
10	Dallas Mavericks	36	46	.439	26
11	Golden State Warriors	26	56	.317	36
12	Minnesota Timberwolves	21	61	.256	41
13	Los Angeles Clippers	17	65	.207	45

z - clinched division title
y - clinched division title
x - clinched playoff spot

=== Game log ===
1994–95 game log
Total: 26–56 (Home: 15–26; Road: 11–30)
November: 8–5 (home: 5–1; road: 3–4)

Game	Date	Team	Score	High points	High rebounds	High assists	Location Attendance	Record

December: 2–12 (home: 2–5; road: 0–7)

Game	Date	Team	Score	High points	High rebounds	High assists	Location Attendance	Record
14	December 1, 1994; 7:30 p.m. PST	Houston	L 109–113	Sprewell (30)	Gugliotta (13)	Hardaway, Jennings (6)	Oakland-Alameda County Coliseum Arena; 15,025	8–6
26	December 29, 1994; 5:30 p.m. PST	@ Houston	L 124–126	Hardaway (32)	Gugliotta (12)	Hardaway (10)	The Summit; 16,611	10–16

January: 2–11 (home: 1–5; road: 1–6)

Game	Date	Team	Score	High points	High rebounds	High assists	Location Attendance	Record

February: 4–9 (home: 2–4; road: 2–5)

Game	Date	Team	Score	High points	High rebounds	High assists	Location Attendance	Record
All-Star Break
52	February 25, 1995; 5:30 p.m. PST	@ Houston	L 105–112	Sprewell (30)	Alexander (9)	Hardaway (8)	The Summit; 16,611	16–36

March: 6–11 (home: 3–5; road: 3–6)

Game	Date	Team	Score	High points	High rebounds	High assists	Location Attendance	Record

April: 4–8 (home: 2–6; road: 2–2)

Game	Date	Team	Score	High points	High rebounds	High assists	Location Attendance	Record
73	April 6, 1995; 7:30 p.m. PDT	Houston	L 102–110	Legler (24)	Rozier (21)	Jennings (8)	Oakland-Alameda County Coliseum Arena; 15,025	23–50

1994–95 schedule

== Player statistics ==
Legend
GP	Games played	GS	Games started	MPG	Minutes per game
FG%	Field-goal percentage	3P%	3-point field-goal percentage	FT%	Free-throw percentage
RPG	Rebounds per game	APG	Assists per game	SPG	Steals per game
BPG	Blocks per game	PPG	Points per game

Player	GP	GS	MPG	FG%	3P%	FT%	RPG	APG	SPG	BPG	PPG
Victor Alexander	50	29	24.7	.515	.240	.600	5.8	1.2	.6	.6	10.0
Manute Bol^{1}	5	2	16.2	.600	.600	.000	2.4	.0	.0	1.8	3.0
Chris Gatling	58	22	25.3	.633	.000	.592	7.6	.9	.7	.9	13.7
Tom Gugliotta^{1}	40	40	33.1	.443	.311	.567	7.4	3.1	1.3	.6	10.9
Tim Hardaway	62	62	37.4	.427	.378	.760	3.1	9.3	1.4	.2	20.1
Rod Higgins^{1}	5	2	9.2	.250	.167	.750	1.4	.6	.2	.2	2.0
Keith Jennings	80	24	21.5	.447	.368	.876	1.9	4.7	1.2	.0	7.4
Tim Legler	24	0	15.5	.522	.520	.882	1.7	1.1	.5	.0	7.3
Ryan Lorthridge	37	2	18.2	.475	.214	.648	1.9	2.7	.8	.0	7.4
Donyell Marshall^{1}	32	23	32.8	.413	.270	.640	6.5	1.5	.6	1.2	14.8
Dwayne Morton	41	6	9.6	.388	.360	.682	1.4	.4	.3	.4	4.1
Chris Mullin	25	23	35.6	.489	.452	.879	4.6	5.0	1.5	.8	19.0
Ricky Pierce	27	6	24.9	.437	.329	.877	2.4	1.5	.8	.1	12.5
Carlos Rogers	49	18	20.8	.529	.143	.521	5.7	.8	.4	1.1	8.9
Clifford Rozier	66	34	22.6	.485	.286	.447	7.4	.7	.5	.6	6.8
Rony Seikaly	36	35	28.8	.516	.000	.694	7.4	1.3	.6	1.0	12.1
Latrell Sprewell	69	69	40.2	.418	.276	.781	3.7	4.0	1.6	.7	20.6
David Wood	78	13	17.1	.469	.341	.778	3.1	.8	.4	.2	5.5

1. Statistics with the Warriors.

Player statistics citation:

== Awards and records ==
=== Awards ===
NBA All-Rookie Teams

- Donyell Marshall – All-Rookie Second Team

1995 NBA All-Star Game

- Latrell Sprewell (second participation, first as a starter)

== Transactions ==
=== Trades ===
July 1, 1994	To Golden State Warriors 1995 second-round pick	To Los Angeles Lakers Anthony Miller

July 18, 1994	To Golden State Warriors Ricky Pierce; Carlos Rogers; 1995 second-round pick 1995 second-round pick	To Seattle SuperSonics Byron Houston; Šarūnas Marčiulionis

November 2, 1994	To Golden State Warriors Rony Seikaly	To Miami Heat Sasha Danilović; Billy Owens

November 17, 1994	To Golden State Warriors Tom Gugliotta; 1996 first-round pick 1998 first-round pick 2000 first-round pick	To Washington Bullets Chris Webber

February 18, 1995	To Golden State Warriors Donyell Marshall	To Minnesota Timberwolves Tom Gugliotta

=== Free agents ===
Additions
Player	Date signed	Former team
Bob McCann	September 28	Aresium Milan (Italy)
Rod Higgins	October 6	Cleveland Cavaliers
David Wood	October 6	Detroit Pistons
Manute Bol	October 18	Philadelphia 76ers
Ryan Lorthridge (10-day)	January 12	none
Ryan Lorthridge (rest of season)	January 22	Golden State Warriors
Tim Legler (10-day)	March 7	Omaha Racers (CBA)
Tim Legler (rest of season)	March 27	Golden State Warriors

Subtractions
Player	Date signed	New Team
Avery Johnson	July 22	San Antonio Spurs
Bob McCann	October 24	Rapid City Thrillers (CBA)
Rod Higgins	November 16	none
Manute Bol	February 15	Florida Beach Dogs (CBA)

Player Transactions Citation:

== See also ==
- 1994-95 NBA season
