= Ryan Lorthridge =

American basketball player

Personal information
- Born: July 27, 1972 (age 54) Nashville, Tennessee, U.S.
- Listed height: 6 ft 4 in (1.93 m)
- Listed weight: 190 lb (86 kg)

Career information
- High school: Murrah (Jackson, Mississippi)
- College: Jackson State (1991–1994)
- NBA draft: 1994: undrafted
- Playing career: 1994–2007
- Position: Shooting guard
- Number: 33, 9

Career history
- 1994: Mexico City Aztecas
- 1994–1995: Rockford Lightning
- 1995: Golden State Warriors
- 1995: Scaligera Verona
- 1995–1996: Florida Beachdogs
- 1996–1997: Gymnastikos S. Larissas
- 1997–1998: Fabriano Basket
- 1998–1999: Pau-Orthez
- 1999–2001: Trenton Shooting Stars
- 2001: Scaligera Verona
- 2001–2002: KAOD
- 2002: Gary Steelheads
- 2002–2003: Hapoel Jerusalem
- 2003: Toros de Aragua
- 2003–2004: Libertad Sunchales
- 2004: Gigantes de Carolina
- 2004–2005: Guaros de Lara
- 2006–2007: Polonia Warszawa

Career highlights
- Greek League All-Star (2002); Greek All-Star Game Slam Dunk winner (2002); French League champion (1999); CBA All-Rookie First Team (1995); All-IBL First Team (2000)
- Stats at NBA.com
- Stats at Basketball Reference

Ryan Lorthridge (born July 27, 1972) is a retired American professional basketball player. During his thirteen-year professional career, Lorthridge played briefly in the National Basketball Association (NBA).

== High school career ==
Lorthridge, a 6 ft 4 1/2 in (1.94 m) tall shooting guard, was born in Nashville, Tennessee. He attended Murrah High School, in Jackson, Mississippi. While at Murrah, he played high school basketball.

== College career ==
After high school, Lorthridge attended Jackson State University. At Jackson State, he played college basketball with the Jackson State Tigers. He was at the school from 1991 to 1994.

== Professional career ==
Lorthridge played in 37 NBA games with Golden State Warriors, in the 1994–95 season. He also played in the Continental Basketball Association (CBA) and in the International Basketball League (IBL), during his professional career. In addition to that, Lorthridge also played professionally in several different leagues in Europe, the Israeli Super League, the Venezuelan Professional League, Argentine National League, and in the Puerto Rican Super League. He was the Greek All-Star Game's slam dunk contest winner in 2002.
