= Las Vegas Silver Bandits =

- League: IBL
- Founded: 1999
- Folded: 2001
- Stadium: Thomas and Mack Center
- Capacity: 17,923
- Location: Paradise, Nevada
- Team colors: light blue, dark blue, red, silver
- Website: www.iblhoops.com/teams/bandits (archived on December 6, 2000)

The Las Vegas Silver Bandits were a team in the International Basketball League (IBL). They played at the Thomas and Mack Center in Paradise, Nevada in 1999.

The team president was Michael A. Olsen. The V.P. of Basketball Operations was Cindy Hays. Burke Reeder served as Director of Sales. Tony Desiere who now does sports radio in the Denver Colorado market, was the sports information director. Tim Neverett who is the new voice of the Pittsburgh Pirates was the Silverbandits play by play announcer.

Jackie Robinson purchased the Silver Bandits in the spring of 2000. Robinson achieved All-American and Hall of Fame status at UNLV, and went on to win an NBA World Championship with the 1979 Seattle SuperSonics. In business, Robinson has spent the past twenty years building successful businesses in real estate, construction, credit, and in the food and beverage industries.

The IBL suffered from lack of interest and attendance and folded in 2001 with pressure from the NBA Development League.
