= Ortaköy S.K. =

Ortaköy
- Full name: Ortaköy Spor Kulübü
- Founded: 1930
- Manager: Kaya Tevfik Saygılı
- League: Turkish Regional Amateur League

Ortaköy Spor Kulübü (OSK) was first formed in the 20th century, under a different name –“Ortaköy Idman Yurdu”, when a group of people at the Ortaköy decided to form football, ping pong, athletics and swimming teams. The club’s formal colours were orange and black.

After 1910, the club played under the name of “Ortaköy Gençlik Kulübü”. Soon after, the club continued playing in friendlies and local cup competitions for the next years. In 1930s the club turned professional and changed its name to “Ortaköy Spor Kulübü”, finally joining the football and basketball leagues. The basketball section of the club began in 1954, and since then there have been plenty of ups and downs, including the national 1st division.

The club is continuing the sports activities in different sections such as basketball, football, snooker and bridge. Basketball and football teams had successful years and won many cups in both the professional and amateur leagues.
