= New Mexico Slam =

- League: IBL
- Founded: 1999
- Folded: 2001
- Stadium: Tingley Coliseum
- Location: Albuquerque, New Mexico
- Team colors: teal, orange, gray
- Website: www.iblhoops.com/teams/slam (archived on December 6, 2000)

The New Mexico Slam was an American professional basketball club. The club competed in the now-defunct International Basketball League which existed from 1999 to 2001.

The Slam played their home games at Tingley Coliseum. The New Mexico State Fair Commission split parking and concession with the team 50-50 and the Slam had to pay a $2,500 per game fee. Former University of New Mexico assistant coach John Whisenant served as the team's head coach. Their logo was described by the Albuquerque Journal as "an angry iguana gripping a basketball".
