= Richmond Rhythm =

Basketball team

- League: IBL
- Founded: 1999
- Folded: 2001
- Stadium: Siegel Center
- Capacity: 7,637
- Location: Richmond, Virginia
- Team colors: red, yellow, white
- Website: www.iblhoops.com/teams/rhythm (archived on January 25, 2000)

The Richmond Rhythm were a professional basketball team based in Richmond, Virginia from 1999 to 2001. The team played in the International Basketball League. They played their home games at Siegel Center on the campus of Virginia Commonwealth University.

== History ==
Former National Basketball Association (NBA) player Ralph Sampson served as Richmond's general manager and vice president. Originally the team was going to join the United States Basketball League (USBL), but eventually joined the fledgling International Basketball League (IBL) in 1999. On June 15, 1999, the Rhythm announced Allan Bristow had been hired as head coach. In July 1999, Chico Averbuck was hired as an assistant coach.

During the IBL's inaugural draft in July 1999, Richmond selected Eddie Lucas from Virginia Tech, who had also been selected in the second round of the National Basketball Association draft by the Utah Jazz. They selected another Virginia Tech player—Ace Custis—in the draft. James Blackwell of Dartmouth College was Richmond's third pick in the 1999 draft. Former NBA player Michael Adams was hired as an assistant coach in September 1999. After losing their first four games of the season, Bristow resigned as the head coach of Richmond and general manager Ralph Sampson took his place in December 1999. Richmond made it to the inaugural IBL championship against the St. Louis Swarm in May 2000. The Rhythm were defeated three games to none in a best-of-five series.

== See also ==
- Virginia Squires
- Roanoke Dazzle
