= International Basketball League (1999–2001) =

Defunct professional men's basketball league in the US (1999–2001)

International Basketball League (IBL)
- Sport: Basketball
- Founded: 1999
- First season: 1999-2000
- Folded: 2001
- No. of teams: 13
- Country: United States
- Continent: FIBA Americas
- Last champion: St. Louis Swarm (2nd title)
- Most titles: St. Louis Swarm (2 titles)

The International Basketball League (IBL) was a short-lived professional men's basketball league in the United States. The IBL was headquartered in Baltimore, Maryland. The league started in 1999 and ended in 2001.

== History ==
=== Background ===
The International Basketball League (IBL) was first proposed in 1996 as a single-structure organization similar to Major League Soccer. Because of this players were paid by the league and not the team's owners. The IBL also had classes they called "Player Education/Life Readiness Plan" in which IBL players were informed about scholarship opportunities and how to balance school and professional basketball. Plans for the league to begin play were tentatively set for November 1997 with 10 unidentified franchise in the United States.

The league sought to have college players or high school players join their league instead of playing in the NCAA, where they could not receive compensation for their play. NCAA spokesperson Katherine Rice responded to the IBL by saying, "As an educational program, we prefer young people to get an education as a basis for their sports activities."

=== Founding ===
A two-day meeting was held in St. Louis, Missouri on January 19, 1999 with over 50 IBL owners, executives and advisers in attendance. They were briefed on several things including potential television contracts, the IBL draft and the playoffs.

On February 15, 1999 IBL president Thaxter Trafton announced the team would begin the season on November 26, 1999. Paul Martha served as the IBL vice president and general legal council.

The International Basketball League was founded in early 1999 and made plans to begin play in fall of that year.

=== Seasons ===
The first season did not quite meet expectations with attendance, but the league was still largely functional, with the Saint Louis Swarm winning the first championship.

The second season was significantly rougher, with the league losing the Baltimore and San Diego franchises and merging with teams from the Continental Basketball Association after that league folded early in 2000. The Swarm won the championship of that league in the second season, and although the league had stated that it would return for a third season, this was not to be the case, and all the teams folded soon after the season ended, although the teams from the former CBA ultimately restarted the CBA the following year.

Although the league had some innovations such as playing the international three-point line and trapezoid lane, and with the intention to offer professional basketball and more reasonable ticket prices, the cost structure of the league was simply too great for the revenue and attendance figures that it received.

=== Partnership with NBA ===
After the CBA suspended operations on February 8, 2001 the IBL absorbed five CBA clubs, increasing its number to 11. And on February 27, 2001, it was announced that the IBL players were allowed to sign contracts with NBA clubs in a deal that placed the league in a role similar to that of the -then- defunct CBA. Thus, NBA teams were able to sign IBL players for the rest of the 2000-01 season.

=== Salary cap ===
During the league's first season the salary cap was $525.000 for a 10-player roster. While a CBA player made roughly $22,000 a year at the time, an average IBL player would make about $50,000 (while ABA 2000 players would get paid significantly more).

== Clubs ==
List of teams
Team	City	Arena(s)	Joined	Folded
Baltimore Bayrunners	Baltimore, Maryland	Baltimore Arena	1999	2000
Cincinnati Stuff	Cincinnati, Ohio	Firstar Center	1999	2001
Connecticut Pride	Hartford, Connecticut	Hartford Civic Center	2001	2001
Gary Steelheads	Gary, Indiana	Genesis Convention Center	2001	2008^{†}
Grand Rapids Hoops	Grand Rapids, Michigan	DeltaPlex Arena	2001	2003^{♯}
Las Vegas Silver Bandits	Paradise, Nevada	Thomas and Mack Center	1999	2001
New Mexico Slam	Albuquerque, New Mexico	Tingley Coliseum	1999	2001
Richmond Rhythm	Richmond, Virginia	Siegel Center	1999	2001
Rockford Lightning	Rockford, Illinois	BMO Harris Bank Center	2001	2006^{‡}
Trenton Shooting Stars	Trenton, New Jersey	Sovereign Bank Arena	1999	2001
San Diego Stingrays	San Diego, California	San Diego Sports Arena	1999	2001
St. Louis Swarm	St. Charles, Missouri	Family Arena	1999	2001
Sioux Falls Skyforce	Sioux Falls, South Dakota	Sioux Falls Arena	2001	—^{§}

^{†} The Gary Steelheads folded in 2008 after last playing in the International Basketball League, which had no association with the 1999 to 2001 IBL
^{♯} The Grand Rapids Hoops joined the re-organized Continental Basketball Association (CBA) in 2001 and played until 2003
^{‡} The Rockford Lightning joined the re-organized CBA in 2001 and played until 2006
^{§} The only franchise from the IBL that is still in existence are the Sioux Falls Skyforce, who now play in the NBA G League.

Map

Locations of teams in the International Basketball League from 1999 to 2001

== Postseason results ==
=== 2000 IBL Playoffs ===
First Round
2	New Mexico Slam	2
3	Las Vegas Silver Bandits	1
2	Trenton Shooting Stars	1
3	Richmond Rhythm	2

Conference Championship
1	St. Louis Swarm	2
2	New Mexico Slam	0
1	Cincinnati Stuff	0
3	Richmond Rhythm	2

IBL Championship
1	St. Louis Swarm	3
3	Richmond Rhythm	0

=== 2001 IBL Playoffs ===
Semifinals
1	St. Louis Swarm	2
2	Rockford Lightning	1
1	Grand Rapids Hoops	2
2	Trenton Shooting Stars	1

IBL Championship
1	St. Louis Swarm	2
1	Grand Rapids Hoops	1

== League awards ==
=== Most valuable player ===
Season	Player	Team
1999–00	Doug Smith	St. Louis Swarm
2000–01	Danny Johnson	St. Louis Swarm

=== Playoffs MVP ===
Season	Player	Team
1999–00		
2000–01	Maurice Carter	St. Louis Swarm

=== Rookie of the year ===
Season	Player	Team
1999–00	Danny Johnson	St. Louis Swarm
2000–01	Neil Edwards	Gary Steelheads

=== Coach of the year ===
Season	Player	Team
1999–00	Bernie Bickerstaff	St. Louis Swarm
2000–01	Bernie Bickerstaff	St. Louis Swarm

=== All–IBL teams ===
==== 1999–2000 ====
- First team:

Player	Team
Danny Johnson	St. Louis Swarm
Ryan Lorthridge	Trenton Shooting Stars
Tremaine Fowlkes	Cincinnati Stuff
J. R. Henderson	Las Vegas Silver Bandits
Doug Smith	St. Louis Swarm

- Second team:

Player	Team
Isaac Burton	Las Vegas Silver Bandits
Jason Sasser	New Mexico Slam
Alex Sanders	Cincinnati Stuff
Ray Tutt	Trenton Shooting Stars
Rocky Walls	Las Vegas Silver Bandits

==== 2000–2001 ====
- First team:

Player	Team
Antonio Smith	Grand Rapids Hoops
Danny Johnson	St. Louis Swarm
Ray Tutt	Trenton Shooting Stars
Roderick Blakney	Cincinnati Stuff
Jeff Sanders	Rockford Lightning

== Statistical leaders ==
Year	Points	Rebounds	Assists	Steals	Blocks
1999–00	J. R. Henderson, 22.6	Rocky Walls, 12.3	Ryan Lorthridge, 7.8	Isaac Burton, 2.5	Soumaila Samake, 2.7
2000–01	Sam Mack, 23.1	Antonio Smith, 13.9	Ryan Lorthridge, 8.6	Roderick Blakney, 2.4	N/A

== Notable players ==
=== International players ===
- Carl Thomas, USA National team (1995-1999) - 12 appearances
- Byron Houston, USA international player (5 appearances in 1999)
- Michael Hawkins, USA international player (14 appearances in 1998-99)
- Kermit Holmes, USA international player (14 appearances in 1997-99)
- Todd Lindeman, USA international player (5 appearances in 1999)
- Doug Smith, USA international player (21 appearances in 1989-99)
- Harold Ellis, USA international player (1993)
- Evers Burns, USA international player (9 appearances in 1997)
- Jason Sasser, USA international player (18 appearances in 1997-98)
- Kiwane Garris, USA international player (9 appearances in 1998)
