= Washington County High School (Georgia) =

Public school in Sandersville, Georgia, United States

Location
- 420 Riddleville Road; Sandersville, Georgia; United States; 32°58′11″N 82°48′13″W

Information
- Type: Public
- Established: 1959
- School district: Washington County School District
- Principal: Darryl Gilbert
- Teaching staff: 52.20 (on an FTE basis)
- Grades: 9–12
- Gender: Coeducational
- Enrollment: 901 (2023–2024)
- Student to teacher ratio: 18.26
- Colors: Vegas gold, black and white
- Mascot: Golden Hawk
- Yearbook: The Talon
- Website: https://www.washingtoncountyschoolsga.org/

Washington County High School is located in Sandersville, Georgia, United States. It was founded in 1959 from a county-wide consolidation of small community high schools. Because segregation was still active, only white students could attend. A twin school for black students, Thomas Jefferson Elder High School, was built in 1959 on Hines Street in the Tybee neighborhood of Sandersville.

The school got its mascot by student vote among Hawks, Falcons, and Eagles. The colors are derived from the black of Tennille High School (the Tigers) and the gold of Sandersville High School (the Satans).

In 1970, the Washington County (WACO) school system fully integrated, and Washington County High started housing grades 11–12. T.J. Elder High became T.J. Junior High, and housed grades 9–10. In the 1984–85 school year, the current 9–12 format went into effect.

During the 1980–81 school year, a vocational building was built, housing a bigger library. In 1993, an extensive renovation took place on the original 1959 building, removing the numerous windows that lined the outside walls of most of the original building and enlarging the cafeteria.

In 1997 a gym, front office complex, science classrooms, and labs were built. The old gym complex was renovated into a fine arts wing, adding a larger band room, chorus room, and 300-seat theater.

== Distinctions ==
The school has achieved many distinctions:

- Advanced Placement courses and honors level college preparatory classes
- Georgia Governor’s Honors Program participants and National Merit Scholars
- Washington County STAR Student
- Washington County DAR Good Citizen
- Rotary Speech Contest and Optimist Essay Contest winners
- Two National Board-certified teachers
- Named by GeorgiaEducation.org as one of the three high schools in Georgia to have moved from a low-performing school to an exemplary school
- Numerous region and state titles for SkillsUSA, HOSA – Future Health Professionals, and FBLA with winners advancing to nationals
- Entrepreneurship program through sponsorship by Georgia REAL Student
- Business, Healthcare Science, and Construction programs industry certified
- Percussion consistently receives "Superior" ratings at festivals throughout the state
- District Honor band members as well as All-State Musicians
- 2 state titles and 4 state runner-up titles in theater competition
- Region championships for the last six years for Debate and Literary teams
- Literary team state champions 2008 and 2009, and 3rd place in 2010
- Several students published in state and national publications
- 24 students in both Latin and Spanish inducted into the International Foreign Language Honor Society, Foreign Language Alliance for International Rapport (FLAIR), FLAIR's only Latin Student of the Year 2009
- Georgia Governor's Honors Program participant in Communicative Arts in 2009
- A.C.E. (Accepting the Challenge of Excellence) Award recipients Washington County scholarship winners
- Georgia Career Student Association state champions 2010
- Interact — 2009 District club of the year
- Special Olympics participation 2009, 2010 State Fall Games with multiple medal winners; hosted regional Olympics 2011
- Special Olympics "Face of the Year" student for State Fall Games
- Georgia All-Classification Weightlifting Champions 2001-2002; State Runner-Up 2000, 2004, 2005
- Area 4 All-Classification Weight-lifting Champions 2000, 2001, 2002, 2003, 2004, 2005, 2006, 2007, 2008, 2009, 2010, 2011
- Set the Bigger, Faster, Stronger National Power Clean Record in 2000, 2002, 2003, and has set or broken 11 National BFS records
- Girls' basketball team region champions in 2009-10 and 2010-2011 school years
- Girls' basketball team won the state AAA championship in 2011. State Champions 1991.
- Boys' basketball team appeared in several state playoffs. State Champions 1993.
- Fast-pitch softball team appeared in state playoffs 2010, 2011, 2013, 2015, 2016
- Varsity football team appeared in several state playoffs. State Champions 1994, 1996, 1997. State Runners-Up 1992, 2004, 2012, 2013.
- B-Team football achieved over 30 consecutive victories
- "Hawk's Nest" voted "Best Baseball Field in the Region"
- Girls' track team region champions 2010
- Boys' track team region champions 2011, three track scholarships in 2011
- Famous Athletic Alumni: Greg Minor (NBA-Boston Celtics), Robert Edwards (NFL-New England Patriots), Takeo Spikes (NFL-Cincinnati, Philadelphia, San Diego, San Francisco), Josh Gordy (NFL-Green Bay, Indianapolis), Allisha Gray (WNBA-Dallas Wings), Terrence Edwards, (CFL-Toronto, Montreal, Winnipeg)

== Notable alumni ==
- Terrence Edwards, University of Georgia and CFL wide receiver, high school football coach
- Robert Edwards, NFL-New England Patriots, Washington County High School's current head football coach
- Josh Gordy, NFL-Green Bay, Indianapolis
- Allisha Gray, WNBA-Atlanta Dream
- Greg Minor, NBA-Boston Celtics
- Takeo Spikes, NFL-Cincinnati, Philadelphia, San Diego, San Francisco
