= Robert Edwards (gridiron football) =

American gridiron football player (born 1974)

Washington County High School
- Title: Head coach

Personal information
- Born: October 2, 1974 (age 52); Tennille, Georgia, U.S.
- Listed height: 5 ft 11 in (1.80 m)
- Listed weight: 218 lb (99 kg)

Career information
- High school: Washington County (Sandersville, Georgia)
- College: Georgia
- NFL draft: 1998: 1st round, 18th overall pick

Career history

Playing
- New England Patriots (1998–2000); Miami Dolphins (2002); Montreal Alouettes (2005–2007); Toronto Argonauts (2007)

Coaching
- Arlington Christian School (2009–2011) Head coach; Greene County High School (Georgia) (2012–2017) Head coach; Riverwood High School (2018–2021) Head coach; Washington County High School (Georgia) (2022–present) Head coach

Awards and highlights
- George Halas Award (2003); PFWA All-Rookie Team (1998); 2× CFL East All Star (2005, 2006); Second-team All-SEC (1997); Florida–Georgia Hall of Fame

Career NFL statistics
- Rushing yards: 1,222
- Rushing average: 3.9
- Rushing touchdowns: 10
- Receptions: 53
- Receiving yards: 457
- Receiving touchdowns: 4
- Stats at Pro Football Reference

Career CFL statistics
- Rushing attempts: 576
- Rushing yards: 3,022
- Rushing touchdowns: 25

Robert Lee Edwards, III (born October 2, 1974) is an American former professional football player who was a running back in the National Football League (NFL) and Canadian Football League (CFL). He played college football for the Georgia Bulldogs and was selected by the New England Patriots in the first round of the 1998 NFL draft with the 18th overall pick. Edwards also played in the NFL for the Miami Dolphins before moving to the CFL with the Montreal Alouettes and ending his career with the Toronto Argonauts.

He is the older brother of retired Winnipeg Blue Bombers receiver Terrence Edwards.

Edwards most recently served as the head coach of the Washington County Golden Hawks in Sandersville, Georgia until 2025.

== College career ==
Edwards was a featured running back at the University of Georgia. He was originally recruited to play cornerback, where he was a starter through his sophomore year. After that season, he was converted to running back. As a running back he set a Bulldog record for scoring five touchdowns in one game against the University of South Carolina.

Throughout his college career, Edwards was injury-prone. He never finished a full season in college due to knee problems, and missed an entire year due to a broken hand which allowed him to earn an injury redshirt for that season.

=== Statistics ===
	Rushing					Receiving					Defense			
YEAR	ATT	YDS	AVG	LNG	TD	NO.	YDS	AVG	LNG	TD	TCK	SCKS	PD	INT
1993	0	0	0.0	0	0	0	0	0.0	0	0	—	—	—	0
1994	0	0	0.0	0	0	0	0	0.0	0	0	—	—	—	4
1995	45	325	7.2	65	6	2	42	21.0	45	1	—	—	—	—
1996	184	809	4.4	32	9	23	199	8.7	34	1	—	—	—	—
1997	165	1200	5.5	80	12	23	214	9.3	27	1	—	—	—	—
Totals	394	2334	5.2	80	27	48	455	9.5	45	3	—	—	—	4

== Playing career ==
Pre-draft measurables
Height	Weight	Arm length	Hand span
5 ft 11 1/2 in (1.82 m)	218 lb (99 kg)	31 1/2 in (0.80 m)	8 3/4 in (0.22 m)

=== National Football League ===
Edwards was chosen by the New England Patriots in the first round of the 1998 NFL draft. He rushed for 1,115 yards for the Patriots in the 1998 National Football League season, before blowing out his knee at an NFL rookie flag football game in Hawaii during Pro Bowl week. Edwards barely escaped the injury without having his leg amputated below the knee, and he was told he might not walk again.

Edwards would not play football again until 2002, when he made his return with the Miami Dolphins. In his first game back, against the Detroit Lions, Edwards caught a touchdown pass and ran for another score. He spent the rest of the season sharing third-down back duties with fellow running back Travis Minor. After the season, he lost his spot on the roster to Leonard Henry. Edwards was awarded the Pro Football Writers Association Halas Award for his comeback from his serious injury. Edwards holds the record for consecutive games with a touchdown to start a career. He had one rushing touchdown in each of the first six games and an additional receiving touchdown in Game 5 against the Kansas City Chiefs in his 1998 rookie season with the Patriots.

=== Statistics ===
	Rushing						Receiving				
YEAR	TEAM	ATT	YDS	AVG	LNG	TD	NO.	YDS	AVG	LNG	TD
1998	NE	291	1,115	3.8	53	9	35	331	9.5	46	3
2002	MIA	20	107	5.4	19	1	18	126	7.0	14	1
Totals	—	311	1,222	3.9	53	10	53	457	8.6	46	4

=== Canadian Football League ===
Edwards joined the CFL's Montreal Alouettes in 2005, and was the team's leading rusher, running for over 1,000 yards each of the first two seasons he played in Montreal. In addition to being the Montreal Alouettes leading rusher, Edwards was twice named a CFL Eastern Division All-Star (2005, 2006). On August 18, 2007, Edwards was released by the Alouettes. He was picked up by the Toronto Argonauts a day later.

On January 31, 2008, Edwards was released by the Argonauts.

=== Statistics ===
	Rushing						Receiving				
YEAR	TEAM	ATT	YDS	AVG	LNG	TD	NO.	YDS	AVG	LNG	TD
2005	MTL	187	1,199	6.4	37	8	21	202	9.6	24	0
2006	MTL	239	1,137	4.8	—	14	27	211	7.8	26	3
2007	MTL	27	72	2.7	—	1	4	38	9.5	13	0
2007	TOR	123	596	4.8	—	2	3	10	3.3	7	0
Totals	—	576	3,022	5.2	—	25	55	461	8.4	26	3

== Coaching career ==
In 2009, Edwards returned to football as the head coach at Arlington Christian School in Fairburn, Georgia.

On April 19, 2012, Edwards was named as the new head football coach of the Greene County (Georgia) Tigers. He succeeds Charlie Winslett, who is currently ranked seventh on Georgia's All-Time Winningest High School Football coaches list.

On January 30, 2018, he was named the new Head football coach at Riverwood High School in Sandy Springs, Georgia.

In February 2022, Edwards was named head coach at his alma mater, Washington County High School in Sandersville, Georgia.
