= Harold Miner =

American basketball player (born 1971)

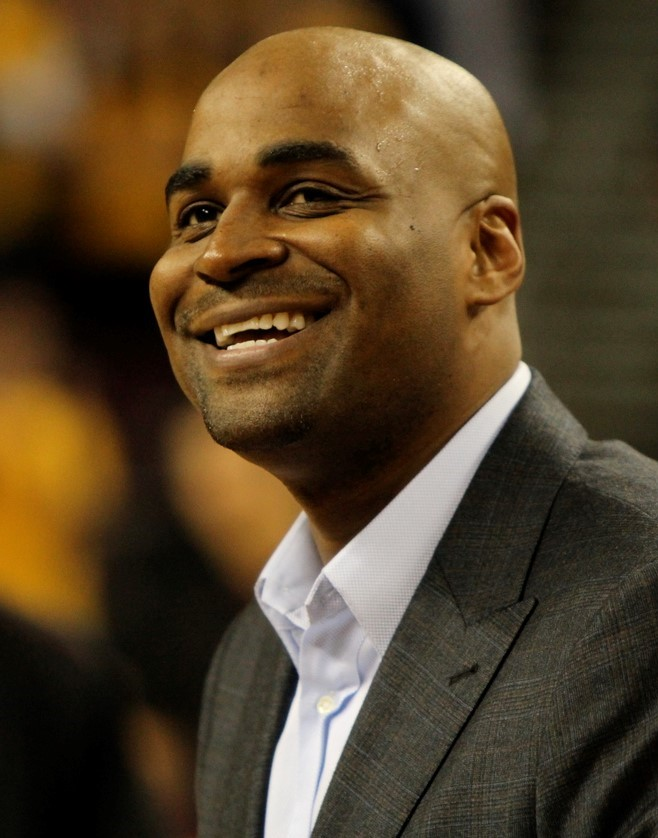
- Miner in 2012

Personal information
- Born: May 5, 1971 (age 55) Inglewood, California, U.S.
- Listed height: 6 ft 3 in (1.91 m)
- Listed weight: 210 lb (95 kg)

Career information
- High school: Inglewood (Inglewood, California)
- College: USC (1989–1992)
- NBA draft: 1992: 1st round, 12th overall pick
- Drafted by: Miami Heat
- Playing career: 1992–1996
- Position: Shooting guard
- Number: 32, 4

Career history
- 1992–1995: Miami Heat
- 1995–1996: Cleveland Cavaliers

Career highlights
- 2× NBA Slam Dunk Contest champion (1993, 1995); Consensus first-team All-American (1992); Pac-10 Player of the Year (1992); 3× First-team All-Pac-10 (1990–1992); Pac-10 Freshman of the Year (1990); No. 23 retired by USC Trojans

Career NBA statistics
- Points: 1,801 (9.0 ppg)
- Rebounds: 432 (2.2 rpg)
- Assists: 245 (1.2 apg)
- Stats at NBA.com
- Stats at Basketball Reference

Harold David Miner (born May 5, 1971) is an American former professional basketball player and two-time champion of the National Basketball Association (NBA) Slam Dunk Contest. He attended college at the University of Southern California (USC) and was a star player on that school's men's basketball team. He left school in 1992 to pursue his professional career, and played in the NBA for the Miami Heat and Cleveland Cavaliers. Despite comparisons to Michael Jordan, Miner's NBA career lasted only four years.

== Early life and college ==
A native of Inglewood, California, Miner first came to prominence as a high school player. A stand-out on his team at Inglewood High School, Miner's spectacular dunking ability resulted in his being given the nickname "Baby Jordan," in reference to fellow NBA high flyer Michael Jordan. In his junior year of high school he averaged 27 points per game, and in his senior year he averaged 28. He also recorded 48 points and 17 rebounds in one game when playing at Inglewood.

Miner attended USC from 1989 until 1992. As a junior in what would be his final season with the team, Miner's play earned him Sports Illustrated magazine's selection as the college basketball player of the year over such notable candidates as Christian Laettner, Shaquille O'Neal, and Alonzo Mourning. Miner led the USC Trojans men's basketball team to the second seed of the Midwest region in the 1992 NCAA Division I men's basketball tournament. The Trojans were upset in the second round, however, falling on one of the most famous baskets in the tournament's history — a three-pointer at the buzzer by James Forrest of Georgia Tech, known as the "Miracle in Milwaukee."

== Professional career ==
Miner left college after the 1991–92 season and declared himself eligible for the 1992 NBA draft. He was selected by the Miami Heat with the 12th overall pick.

Miner won the NBA's Slam Dunk Contest twice, in 1993 and 1995. In the 1995 contest, Miner defeated Isaiah Rider, who had won the previous year, solidifying Miner as one of the game's best dunkers. However, his playing career proved unremarkable and failed to live up to the high expectations with which it began. Despite his dunking prowess, Miner did not get much playing time from Heat coaches, Kevin Loughery and Alvin Gentry.

I always felt the worst thing to happen to Harold was the "Baby Jordan" tag. – George Raveling, Miner's head coach at USC

After the 1994–95 season, Miner was traded to the Cleveland Cavaliers. He averaged only 3.2 points and 7.2 minutes per game for the Cavaliers. On October 18, 1995, he was traded to the Toronto Raptors for Victor Alexander, but that trade was rescinded four days later when Alexander failed his physical. Miner played five scoreless minutes in his last NBA game, a 26-point loss to the Chicago Bulls on February 20, 1996.

Cleveland waived Miner, having played him in only 19 games that season. He tried out for the Toronto Raptors the following year but was cut during the preseason. Rather than continue to pursue a career in professional basketball, either in the NBA or overseas, Miner retired from the sport. He later said that his decision was prompted by the many knee injuries he suffered during his career.

== Personal life ==
As of 2011, Miner had settled in Las Vegas, Nevada, and was married with two children. He said that he had wisely invested the money he had earned in salary and endorsements during his playing career, allowing him to remain a stay-at-home father, rather than needing to seek employment. Over most of the time since his retirement from basketball, he had been disinclined to give interviews or make public appearances, instead remaining private and largely inaccessible. In 2010, however, he agreed to an interview in which he indicated a desire to begin reconnecting with the University of Southern California and with some of his acquaintances from his playing days.

In 2011, Miner appeared at the Pacific-10 men's basketball tournament, to be inducted into that conference's basketball Hall of Honor, and indicated he planned to attend the retirement of his jersey by USC later that year. He would later attend the retirement of his jersey by USC during half time of the game against UCLA on January 15, 2012.
