= Josh Gordy =

American football player (born 1987)

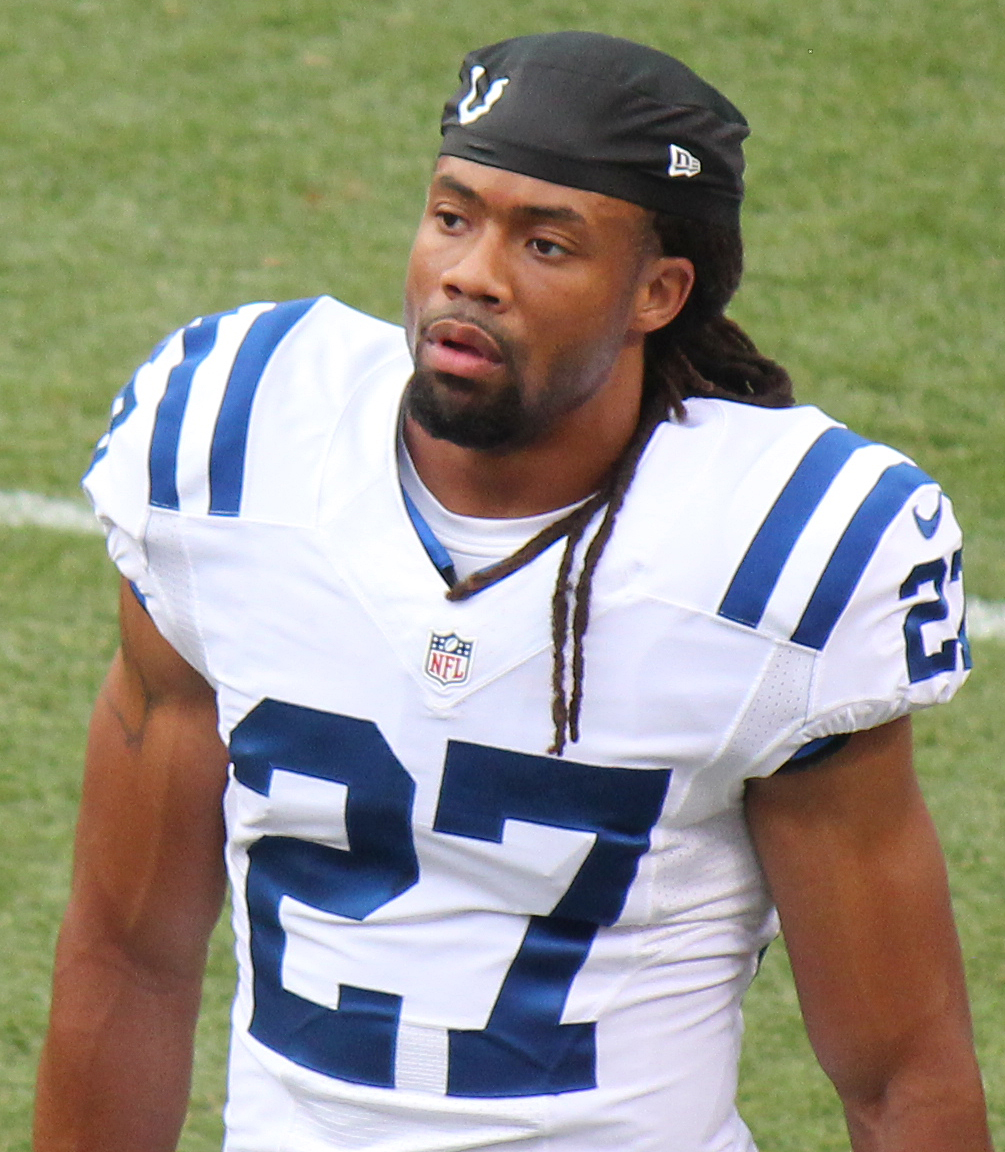
- Gordy with the Indianapolis Colts in 2014

No. 40, 38, 27
- Position: Cornerback

Personal information
- Born: February 9, 1987 (age 39); Warthen, Georgia, U.S.
- Listed height: 5 ft 11 in (1.80 m)
- Listed weight: 195 lb (88 kg)

Career information
- High school: Washington County (Sandersville, Georgia)
- College: Central Michigan
- NFL draft: 2010: undrafted

Career history
- Jacksonville Jaguars (2010)*; Green Bay Packers (2010); St. Louis Rams (2011); Indianapolis Colts (2012−2014); New York Giants (2015)
- * Offseason or practice squad member only

Awards and highlights
- Super Bowl champion (XLV); Second-team All-MAC (2009)

Career NFL statistics
- Total tackles: 99
- Sacks: 1.0
- Fumble recoveries: 2
- Pass deflections: 11
- Interceptions: 5
- Stats at Pro Football Reference

Josh Gordy (born February 9, 1987) is an American former professional football player who was a cornerback in the National Football League (NFL). He was signed by the Jacksonville Jaguars as an undrafted free agent in 2010. He played college football for the Central Michigan Chippewas.

Gordy was also a member of the Green Bay Packers, St. Louis Rams, Indianapolis Colts and New York Giants. With the Packers, Gordy won Super Bowl XLV.

== College career ==
Gordy played college football at Central Michigan University, where he had 10 career interceptions as a cornerback fr the Chippewas. He earned All Mid-American Conference honors as a senior while helping CMU win three Mid-American Conference championships in four seasons, and finish in the Top 25 in the nation in the final January 2010 AP Poll and USA Today Coaches Poll.

== Professional career ==
=== Jacksonville Jaguars ===
After playing at Central Michigan University, Gordy went undrafted and signed as a free agent with the Jacksonville Jaguars. He would only spend his time with the Jaguars as an offseason member of their secondary.

=== Green Bay Packers ===
Gordy then signed with the Green Bay Packers and spent time on and off of their practice squad and the team for much of the 2010 season. In his 2010 stint with the Packers, Gordy earned his first Super Bowl ring.

=== St. Louis Rams ===
After spending time with the Packers, the St. Louis Rams signed Gordy off of Green Bay's practice squad in 2011 due to many injuries in their secondary. Gordy was then given numerous starting opportunities. He would then set up somewhat of a breakout campaign for himself, recording three interceptions in limited time in the Rams defensive backfield.

=== Indianapolis Colts ===
During training camp in 2012, the St. Louis Rams went from having a need for cornerbacks, to having crowded depth at the position. Therefore, after a solid 2011 campaign coming off the bench with the Rams, Gordy was traded to the Indianapolis Colts on August 22, 2012. He would then spend most of his year with the Colts contributing his play on special teams. Gordy was a restricted free agent after the 2013–14 season ended. On April 21, 2014, he signed a qualifying offer from the Colts.

=== New York Giants ===
Gordy signed with the New York Giants on April 14, 2015. On August 29, 2015, Gordy suffered a hip injury during the third preseason game against the New York Jets. On September 1, 2015, he was placed on injured reserve by the Giants. On September 23, 2015, Gordy was released by the Giants with an injury settlement.
