= Slam Dunk Contest =

NBA basketball contest

- Sport: Basketball
- Competition: National Basketball Association
- Discipline: Dunking
- Sponsored by: AT&T

History
- First award: Julius Erving, 1976
- Most wins: 3 times: Mac McClung; Nate Robinson
- Most recent: Keshad Johnson, 2026
- Website: AT&T Slam Dunk

The NBA Slam Dunk Contest (officially known as the AT&T Slam Dunk) is an annual National Basketball Association (NBA) competition held during the NBA All-Star Weekend.

The contest was conceived of and started by the American Basketball Association (ABA) for its 1976 ABA All-Star Game in Denver. The winner was Julius Erving of the New York Nets. As a result of the ABA–NBA merger later that year, the contest moved to the NBA for the 1976–77 season.

There was not another slam dunk contest at the professional level until 1984. The contest has adopted several formats over the years, including, until 2014, the use of fan voting, via text-messaging, to determine the winner of the final round. The current champion of the Slam Dunk Contest is Keshad Johnson (2026).

== History ==
=== 1976 ABA Slam Dunk Contest ===
The first-ever Slam Dunk Contest was held on January 27, 1976, at McNichols Sports Arena in Denver during halftime of the 1976 ABA All-Star Game, the league's final All-Star game before the completion of the ABA–NBA merger. In financial trouble and fighting with the NBA for viewers, the ABA started the slam dunk contest as a gimmick to attract viewers nationwide. In Remember the ABA, Jim Bukata recalled, "We were sitting around the office one day, discussing things that would draw more people, and it just came to us…It was Julius [Erving] really giving us the idea that we're the league of the dunkers. So we said, 'Well if that's the case, let's have a contest.' It really was as simple as that. …Three guys talking about what we could do to sell a few more tickets." Bukata was the director of marketing and public relations for the ABA. The other two in the room were the league's finance director Jim Keeler and Carl Scheer, general manager of the Denver Nuggets who were hosting the All-Star game.

There was a format each competitor had to follow in which they must attempt five dunks in a row under two minutes, with the clock stopping after each shot to allow the player to plan their next attempt. One required dunk was from a standing position under the basket, and another from a distance of ten feet away from the basket in the foul lane. The next three required dunks were freestyle positions, one coming in from the left side of the basket, one coming in from the right side of the basket, and finally from either corner down the baseline to the basket. At the contest, it was announced that the competitors were judged on artistic ability, body flow, fan response, and imagination, earning up to ten points in each category. There were $1,200 in prizes provided by the Denver Nuggets and KHOW radio station.

There were five competitors: Artis "A-Train" Gilmore of the Kentucky Colonels went first followed by George "Iceman" Gervin of the San Antonio Spurs, Larry "Special K" Kenon of the San Antonio Spurs, David "Skywalker" Thompson of the Denver Nuggets, and finally Julius "Dr. J" Erving of New York Nets.

Rookie and shortest competitor in the contest, Thompson recalls, "Since my hands weren't very big, I couldn't really palm the ball so I would cup it. I'd cup it with my left hand between my hand and forearm and put it above the rim and come over the top with my right hand and punch it into the basket. Very few guys could do it, I was told that Wilt Chamberlain could do something like it but I never seen it. You not only had to be able to jump high but you had to have the hang time, you had to be able to levitate up there and punch it through the basket.” Thompson performed a 360 degree or twist-around dunk to finish his routine—the first time this trick had ever been seen. However, Thompson missed a dunk during his routine which counted as a zero; Gervin missed two dunks.

All competitors had to perform a dunk from ten feet, but Julius Erving started marking his steps from the free throw line which is fifteen feet away. Erving then completed a dunk from the free throw line, winning the contest. He said, "I just wanted to make a nice, soaring play that would get the fans out of their seats. I really started going at half court and got a good running start and made sure that I made the shot authoritatively."

Erving said that his favorite dunk of the night was by Thompson who "came out of the corner, spun 360 degrees in the air and slammed it, 50 by anyone's standards.” One basketball historian wrote, "The 1976 Slam Dunk Contest represents a key focal point in basketball history. David Thompson and the rest of the ABA players were true pioneers and innovators; they transcended the game of basketball into what it is today."

=== 1976–77 NBA Slam Dunk Contest ===
In 1976, Arthur Erhat filed a patent for "a rim that had give but immediately returned to its original position," making dunking safe for the first time by significantly reducing the shattering of backboards. That year, NBA held its first Slam Dunk Contest as a one-off, season-long event similar to NBA Horse event held the following season. During halftime at each game, there was a one-on-one slam dunk competition.

There were 22 competitors at multiple venues throughout the event—one for each team at the league—including future Hall of Famers Kareem Abdul-Jabbar, Alex English, Julius Erving, George Gervin, Elvin Hayes, Moses Malone, and David Thompson. Former ABA player Darnell "Dr. Dunk" Hillman was named the winner that season, beating out the Golden State Warriors' Larry McNeill in the championship round on June 5, 1977, in Portland during the halftime of the final playoff game. Although he received the winner's $15,000 check, Hillman did not receive a trophy until 2017.

=== 1980s ===
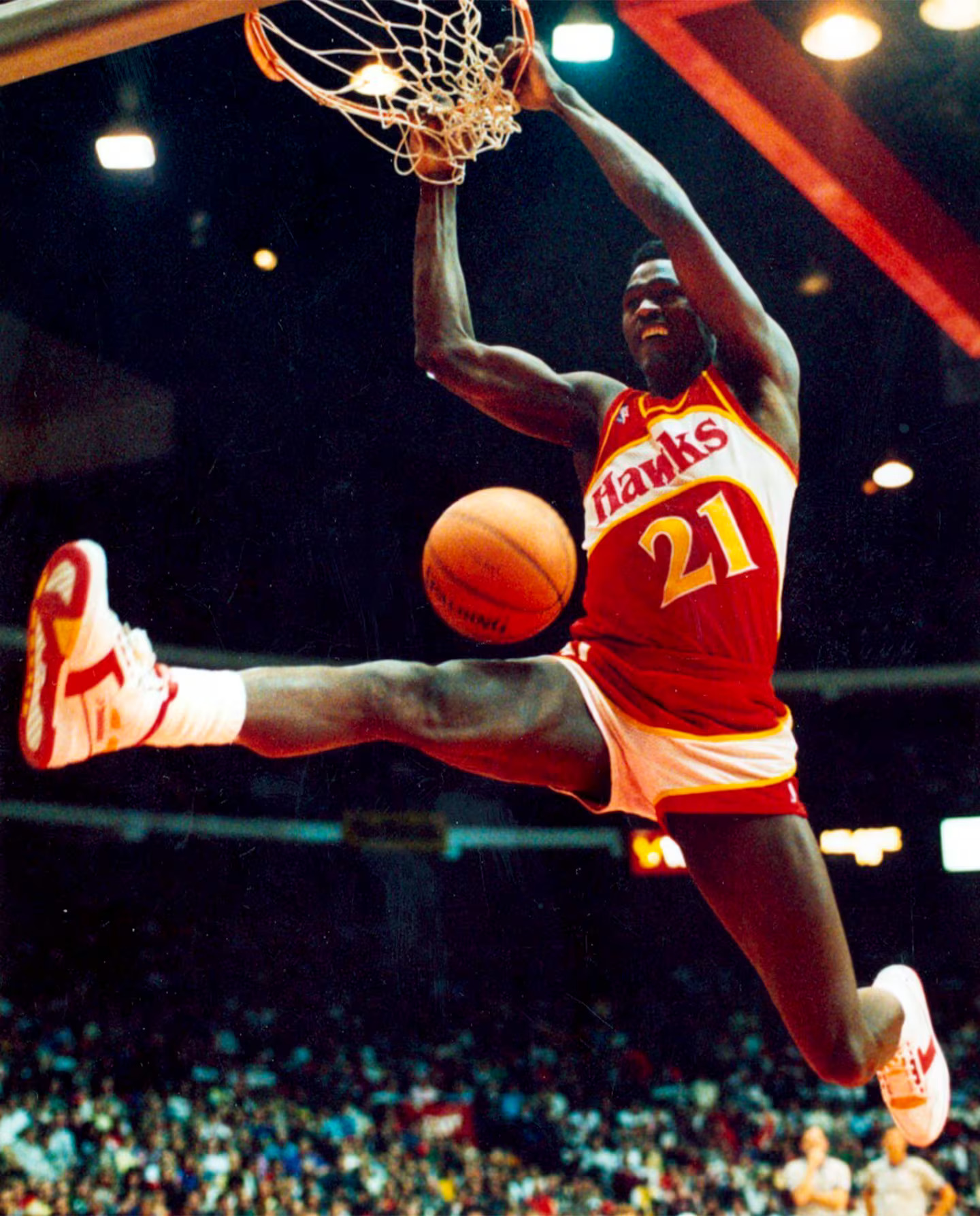
Dominique Wilkins dunking at the 1988 NBA Slam Dunk Contest

The NBA reintroduced the Slam Dunk Contest on a permanent basis as a free-standing event during All-Star Weekend in 1984 at its birthplace in Denver. Phoenix's Larry Nance defeated the original Dunk contest winner Julius Erving in the final round. Dominique Wilkins won the contest the following year, but in 1986 his Atlanta Hawks teammate Spud Webb made history when he defeated Wilkins in the final, preventing him from retaining his title. Standing a mere 5 feet 6 inches tall, Webb became the shortest player ever to win the contest, a distinction that he still holds. Chicago's Michael Jordan won back-to-back dunk contest victories in 1987 and in 1988. His victory over Wilkins in 1988 in Chicago finished with a perfect 50 dunk from the free-throw line for his third dunk to win the contest. However, the announcers did note that Wilkins was given abnormally low score for his breathtaking third dunk, a 45, allowing Jordan to win it by 2 with his perfect 50. To this day, the allegations of "home cooking" still float around surrounding the event (it was held on Jordan's home court; one of the judges was former Chicago Bears star Gale Sayers; and another judge, former NBA star Tom Hawkins, is a Chicago native) and until the competition in 2020, was considered arguably the most controversial of the slam dunk competitions. Extensive debate continues whether Wilkins 3rd dunk should have scored higher than a 45 and whether Jordan's second dunk, which scored a 47, was a superior creative effort to Wilkins third dunk. The following year in Houston would have been the first time where all the previous dunk champs would've faced off against each other; but Jordan, Wilkins, and Nance, who were going to play in the All-Star Game that Sunday, decided to skip the contest due to minor injuries. New York's Kenny "Sky" Walker, a last-minute replacement whose father died just days beforehand, upset Portland's Clyde "The Glide" Drexler, the hometown favorite and Houston native who was seen as the favorite to win. 1986 champ Spud Webb finished 3rd, while Shelton Jones finished 4th.

=== 1990s ===
In 1990, Dominique Wilkins of the Atlanta Hawks edged out Kenny Smith of the Sacramento Kings to win his second Slam Dunk Contest. He first won it in 1985 over Michael Jordan. Smith scored high points for originality with his signature dunk—he started by turning his back to the basket, bouncing the ball backward between his legs and off the backboard, then turning and grabbing it in the air and reverse dunking it. As the 1990s progressed, stars such as Jordan, Wilkins and Drexler sometimes declined to participate and were replaced by less-known players. Harold Miner was a standout in 1993, winning the contest with a reverse power dunk, reaching between his legs and down to his feet in mid-air before sending the ball down. In 1994 and 1997 respectively, Isaiah Rider and Kobe Bryant won the contest. Rider would win with a spectacular, between-the-legs dunk, reminiscent of the Orlando Woolridge effort in the 1984 contest. However, he wasn't able to repeat in 1995, missing the same dunk on several tries, opening the way for Miner to grab his second slam dunk title in three years. In 1998, the Slam Dunk Contest was replaced with the WNBA-NBA 2Ball Contest. In 1999, there was no All-Star Game due to the NBA lockout.

=== 2000s ===
The NBA brought the Slam Dunk Contest back for the 2000 All-Star Weekend in Oakland, California. The 2000 contest was widely acclaimed, featuring a showdown between eventual winner Vince Carter of the Toronto Raptors, his cousin and then-teammate Tracy McGrady, and the Houston Rockets' Steve Francis. Carter won after performing a number of very impressive dunks, including two 360 windmills, a honey dip, and a between-the-legs dunk off a bounced alley-oop from McGrady. The next four contests did not feature superstars like Carter and Bryant, and despite innovative efforts by the likes of Desmond Mason and Jason Richardson, the lack of A-list superstars willing to participate hurt the appeal of the contest.

In 2005, the Slam Dunk Contest returned to its birthplace in Denver. With the spectacular dunks of prior contests, there was buzz that the dunk competition could regain the popularity it had in the 1980s. The Phoenix Suns' Amar'e Stoudemire alley-ooping 360 off a soccer-style header from teammate Steve Nash; J. R. Smith putting it around his back and dunking, and the new champion, Josh Smith alley-ooping over Kenyon Martin all wowed the crowd with their maneuvers. With the change in the rules requiring an additional teammate starting in the second round, they proved there were indeed many ways to dunk a basketball that had not been done before. Amar'e Stoudemire received rave reviews, as did Smith when he did a tribute dunk to Dominique Wilkins while donning Wilkins' jersey.

Again in 2006, the Dunk Contest in Houston revitalized the interests of audiences as 5'9" Nate Robinson of the New York Knicks took the title with a great dunk-off. One of his most exciting dunks was a high-flying dunk over former Slam Dunk Contest winner, 5'7" Spud Webb. The 2006 Slam Dunk Contest was also the first Dunk Contest in history to have a "Dunk Off", the equivalent to a Dunk Contest overtime, between Knicks point guard Nate Robinson and shooting guard Andre Iguodala of the Philadelphia 76ers. Many fans argue that Iguodala should have won the contest, as it took Robinson fourteen attempts before finally completing his dunk. Iguodala pulled off a dunk where he started out of bounds from the right side of the baseline while teammate Allen Iverson bounced the ball off the back of the right side of the backboard. Iguodala caught the ball in mid-air behind the backboard, spun around to the other side while ducking his head (to avoid colliding with the backboard) and dunked it with his right hand.

On February 17, 2007, the contest was held in Las Vegas. Judges for the event were all past winners: Michael Jordan, Dominique Wilkins, Kobe Bryant, Julius Erving, and Vince Carter. The title was taken by the Boston Celtics' Gerald Green, who, among other dunks, jumped over reigning champ Nate Robinson while covering his face – a homage to 1991 winner, Dee Brown, whose jersey Green had worn. He also scored a perfect fifty with his last slam, a windmill over a table. Other noteworthy dunks include a dunk by Orlando Magic center Dwight Howard, who, while making his dunk, stuck a sticker with his smiling face on the backboard a reported 12'6" from the ground, two and a half feet beyond the regulation NBA rim.

On February 16, 2008, the contest was held in New Orleans. Judges for the event included Darryl Dawkins, Dominique Wilkins, Karl Malone, Julius Erving, and Magic Johnson. The title was taken by Orlando Magic center Dwight Howard. Howard's most noteworthy dunk came during the first round, his second dunk overall, when he took off his jersey to reveal a Superman shirt and cape. With teammate Jameer Nelson's assistance he would make a leaping dunk from just in front of the free-throw line after a running start, throwing the ball through the rim from a few feet away. Other noteworthy dunks included the first round slam by Jamario Moon while the previous year's winner, Gerald Green, relied heavily on theatrics by blowing out a cupcake with a birthday candle on the rim before dunking (a jam he termed "The Birthday Cake"). For the first time ever, fan voting determined the outcome of the final round of the contest; Howard beat Green for the trophy by claiming 78% of the fans' votes.

Nate Robinson won the 2009 contest on February 14 in Phoenix, Arizona. The 5'9" guard dressed all in green as "Krypto-Nate" (a portmanteau of 'Nate' and Kryptonite) and jumped over 6'11" Dwight Howard characterized as Superman. He defeated Howard in the finals by a fan vote of 52–48 percent. J. R. Smith and Rudy Fernández also competed.

=== 2010s ===
Nate Robinson won the 2010 contest on February 13 in Dallas, becoming the first 3-time Slam Dunk champion. Robinson took on Shannon Brown of the Los Angeles Lakers, Gerald Wallace of the Charlotte Bobcats, and DeMar DeRozan of the Toronto Raptors. DeRozan earned his spot in the competition by defeating Los Angeles Clippers guard Eric Gordon in the inaugural Sprite Slam Dunk-In held the night before the actual dunk contest. Robinson and DeRozan advanced to the final round, where Robinson's double-pump reverse dunk helped seal a 51% to 49% victory.

Blake Griffin won the 2011 slam dunk contest by jumping and dunking over the hood of a Kia sedan on February 19 in Los Angeles. JaVale McGee of the Washington Wizards, DeMar DeRozan of the Toronto Raptors, and Serge Ibaka of the Oklahoma City Thunder all competed against Griffin. Griffin and McGee advanced to the final round, where Griffin stole the show, winning the contest with 68% of the vote.

Jeremy Evans won the 2012 Sprite Slam Dunk Contest by performing a dunk over Kevin Hart on February 25 in Orlando, Florida with 29% of the votes. Joining Evans were Chase Budinger of the Houston Rockets, Paul George of the Indiana Pacers, and Derrick Williams of the Minnesota Timberwolves. While George awed the crowd with a dunk with the lights turned off, Evans had perhaps the dunk of the contest by jumping teammate Gordon Hayward, catching two balls from Hayward, and dunking it.

Terrence Ross won the 2013 Sprite Slam Dunk Contest after a tomahawk dunk in tribute to former Toronto Raptors player Vince Carter, as well as a between-the-legs dunk performed while jumping over a ball boy. Ross took on Jeremy Evans of the Utah Jazz, Eric Bledsoe of the Los Angeles Clippers, Kenneth Faried of the Denver Nuggets, Gerald Green of the Indiana Pacers, and James White of the New York Knicks. Evans advanced to the final round to defend his title of slam dunk champion, but was thwarted by Ross. Ross carried the momentum of his near-perfect first round, in which he scored a 99 out of a possible 100, with a stellar final round. Ross won the competition decisively, earning 58% of the vote.

Team East, composed of dunkers Paul George, defending champion Terrence Ross, and John Wall won the 2014 Sprite Slam Dunk Contest in commanding fashion. Under the new team format, they dominated the Freestyle Round, capping it off with a pass off the backboard from Ross to Wall, then off the shot clock from Wall to George for the finish. In the Battle Round, Ross defeated Damian Lillard with a through the legs dunk from rapper Drake, George took down Harrison Barnes with a 360-degree, through the legs finish, and Wall defeated Ben McLemore by jumping over the Wizards' mascot G-Man and throwing down a reverse on the first try. Though Team East are the official winners, Wall was voted by fans as the Dunker of the Night.

To the delight of NBA fans, the 2015 contest was changed back to its original format, as the Freestyle Round as well as the teams were taken out. The 4 dunkers competing were all up-and-coming players: The Bucks' Giannis Antetokounmpo, the Timberwolves' Zach LaVine, the Magic's Victor Oladipo, and the Nets' Mason Plumlee. LaVine took home the hardware with dunks that included a between-the-legs reverse, a behind-the-back slam in which he caught it in midair, a between-the-legs lefthanded dunk, and finished with a between-the-legs dunk as he caught it off the pole behind the backboard. Similar to Howard with Superman, LaVine did his first dunk with a cultural homage, wearing Michael Jordan's jersey from Space Jam.

Zach LaVine won the 2016 slam dunk contest with dunks from a windmill from the free throw line to a between-the-legs reverse dunk. Aaron Gordon (runner-up) of the Orlando Magic, Will Barton of the Denver Nuggets and Andre Drummond of the Detroit Pistons also competed.

Gordon competed in the 2017 contest against the Clippers’ DeAndre Jordan, Indiana's Glen Robinson III and Phoenix rookie forward Derrick Jones Jr. Gordon and Jordan did not make it to the final round. Robinson III won the contest by dunking over Paul George, a Pacer cheerleader, and the Pacers' mascot, while Jones Jr. failed to make his first dunk in the final round.

For the 2018 contest, Oladipo and Aaron Gordon were set to return to the contest, and were joined by Larry Nance Jr. of the Cleveland Cavaliers and Dennis Smith Jr. of the Dallas Mavericks. However, Gordon backed out due to an injury, and was replaced by Jazz rookie Donovan Mitchell. Mitchell went on to win the contest by beating Nance Jr. in the final round.

The 2019 contest featured Hamidou Diallo, the returning Dennis Smith Jr., Miles Bridges, and John Collins. Diallo had the most memorable dunk of the contest when in the first round he jumped over Shaquille O'Neal and put his elbow through the rim. He went on to beat Smith Jr. in the final round to win the contest.

=== 2020s ===
The 2020 contest saw the return of Aaron Gordon, Dwight Howard, and Derrick Jones Jr along with Pat Connaughton of the Bucks. It went down to a dunk-off between Gordon and Jones Jr. Gordon ended up losing despite jumping over 7'5" Tacko Fall.

In the 2021 contest, there were only three competitors, Portland's Anfernee Simons, Knicks rookie Obi Toppin, and Cassius Stanley, on a two-way contract from the Pacers. Simons won the contest, in which he nearly kissed the rim on his final dunk. Toppin was able to win it the following year.

From 2023 to 2025, the contest was won by Mac McClung.

== Slam Dunk Contest champions ==
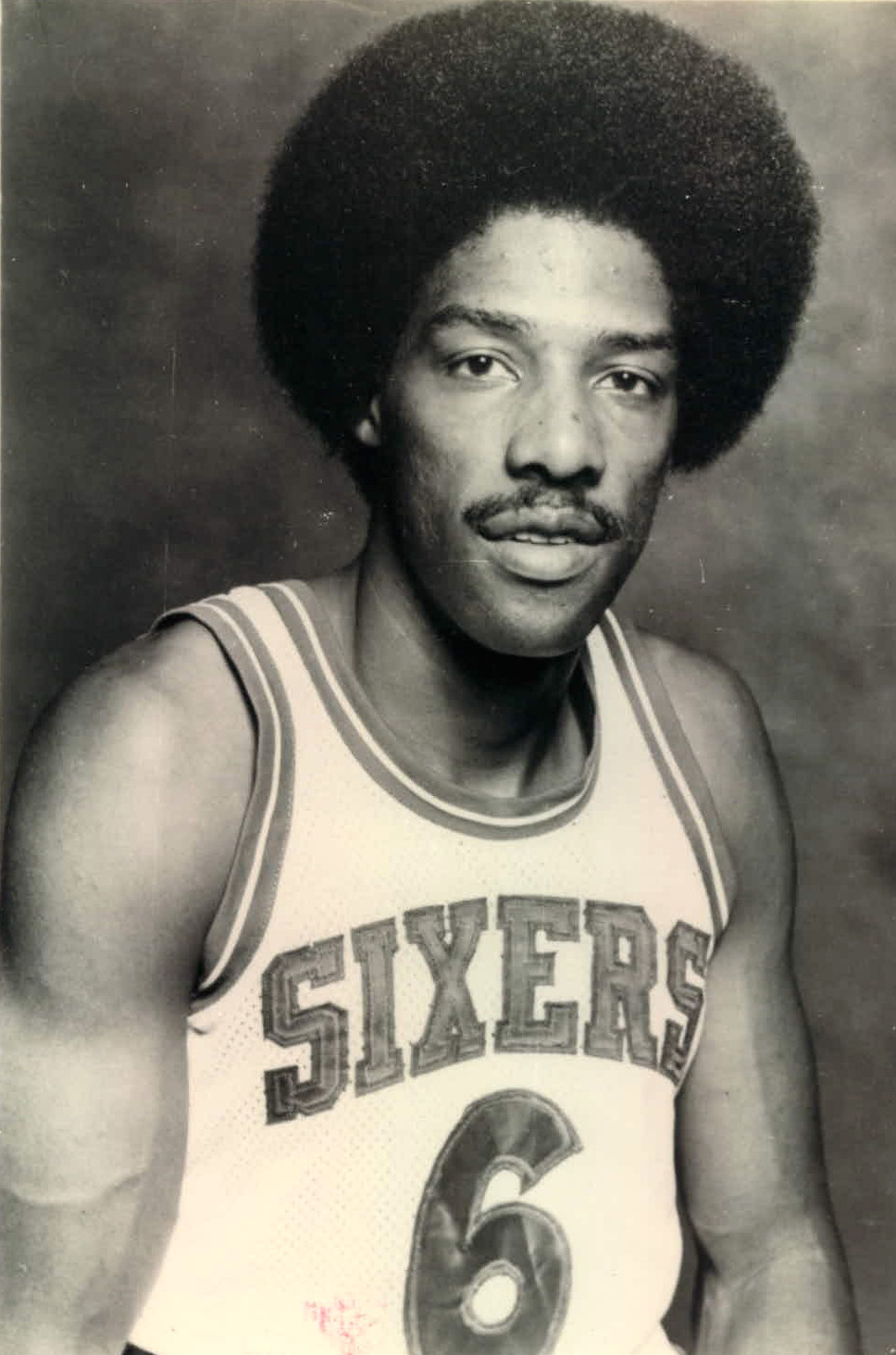
Inaugural champion Julius Erving

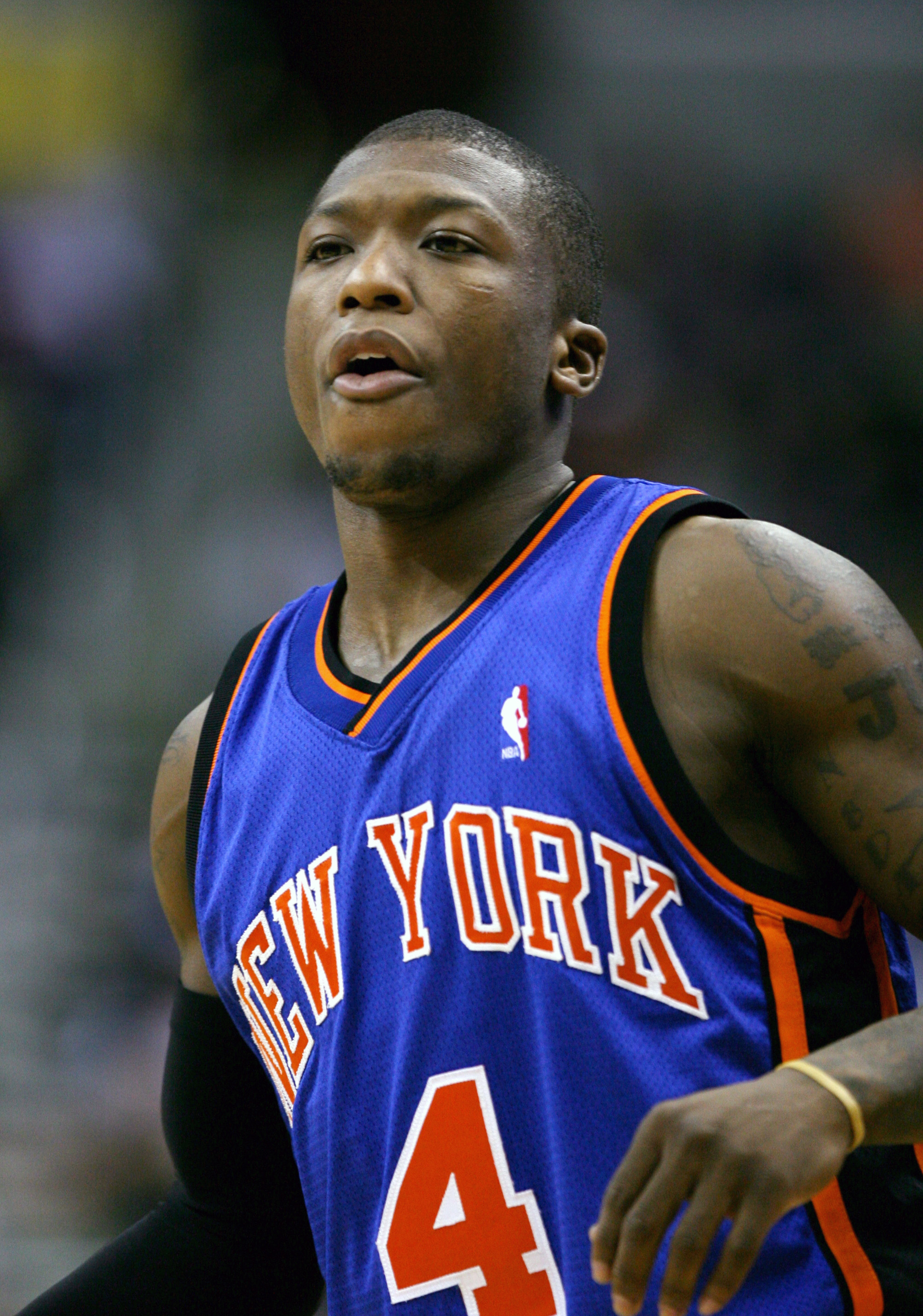
Nate Robinson became the first 3-time champion of the Slam Dunk Contest in 2010.

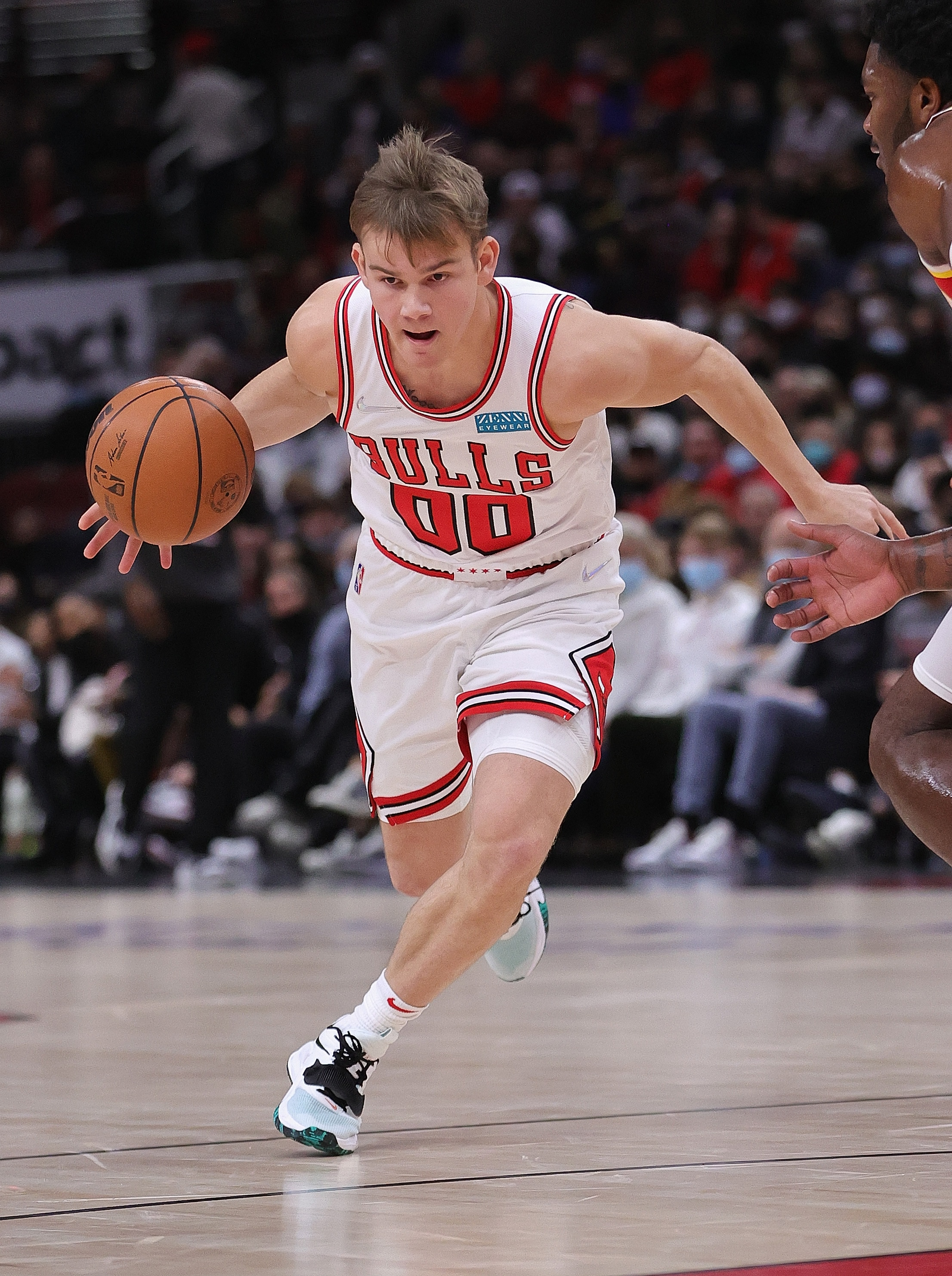
Mac McClung is the only player to win the Slam Dunk Contest in three straight years.

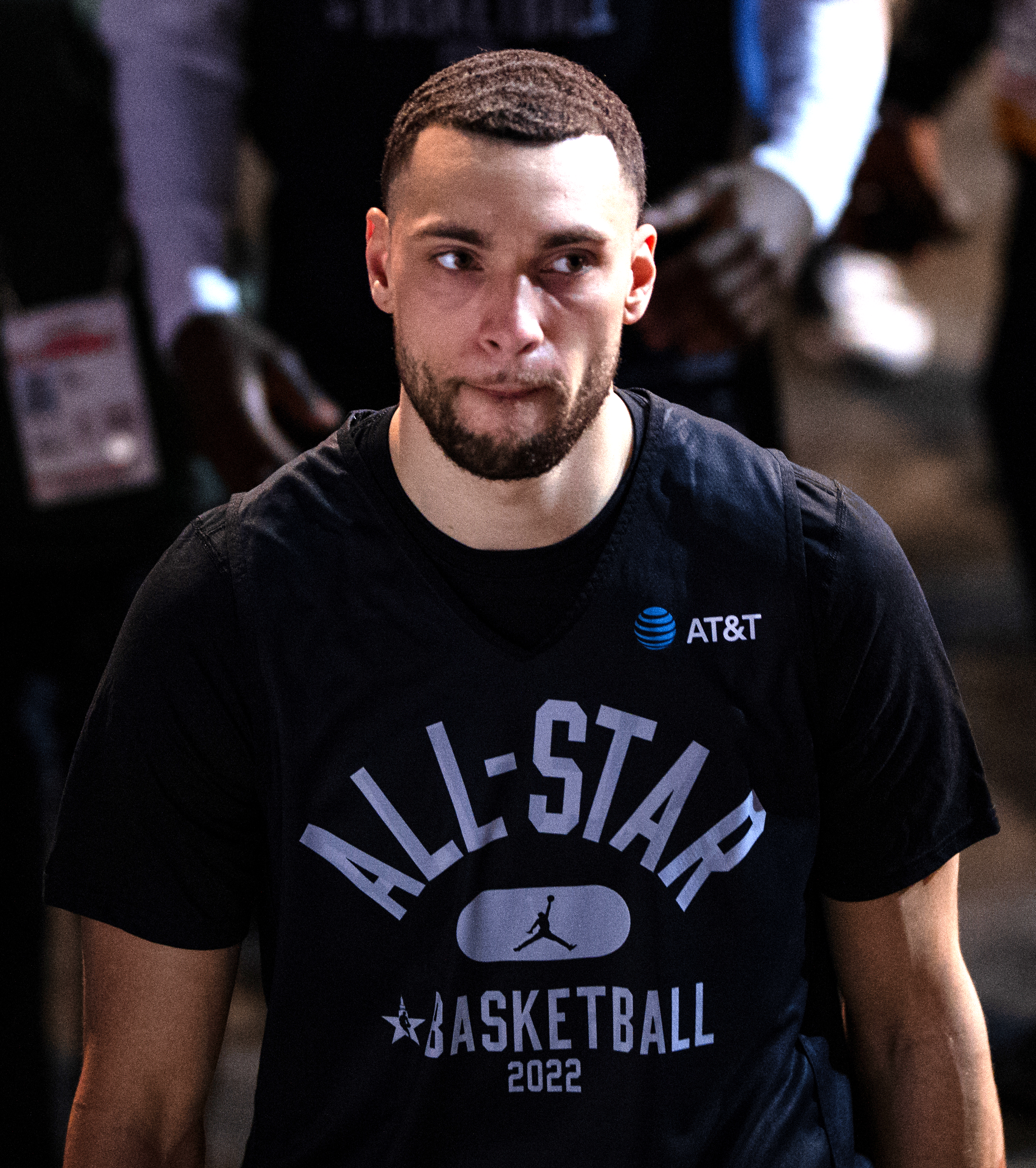
Zach LaVine won in back-to-back years after receiving four consecutive perfect scores in the final round in 2016.

	Active NBA player
	Inducted into the Naismith Memorial Basketball Hall of Fame
Player (#)	Denotes the number of times the player has won
Team (#)	Denotes the number of times a player from this team has won

Season	Player	Team	Ref
1976 (Note: The 1976 event was held during the ABA All-Star game.)	(United States) Julius Erving	New York Nets	
1977	(United States) Darnell Hillman	Indiana Pacers	
1984	(United States) Larry Nance	Phoenix Suns	
1985	(United States) Dominique Wilkins	Atlanta Hawks	
1986	(United States) Spud Webb	Atlanta Hawks (2)	
1987	(United States) Michael Jordan	Chicago Bulls	
1988	(United States) Michael Jordan (2)	Chicago Bulls (2)	
1989	(United States) Kenny Walker	New York Knicks	
1990	(United States) Dominique Wilkins (2)	Atlanta Hawks (3)	
1991	(United States) Dee Brown	Boston Celtics	
1992	(United States) Cedric Ceballos	Phoenix Suns (2)	
1993	(United States) Harold Miner	Miami Heat	
1994	(United States) Isaiah Rider	Minnesota Timberwolves	
1995	(United States) Harold Miner (2)	Miami Heat (2)	
1996	(United States) Brent Barry	Los Angeles Clippers	
1997	(United States) Kobe Bryant	Los Angeles Lakers	
1998	The WNBA–NBA 2Ball Competition replaced the Slam Dunk Contest		
1999	Lockout-shortened season cancelled NBA All-Star Game		
2000	(United States) Vince Carter	Toronto Raptors	
2001	(United States) Desmond Mason	Seattle SuperSonics	
2002	(United States) Jason Richardson	Golden State Warriors	
2003	(United States) Jason Richardson (2)	Golden State Warriors (2)	
2004	(United States) Fred Jones	Indiana Pacers (2)	
2005	(United States) Josh Smith	Atlanta Hawks (4)	
2006	(United States) Nate Robinson	New York Knicks (2)	
2007	(United States) Gerald Green	Boston Celtics (2)	
2008	(United States) Dwight Howard	Orlando Magic	
2009	(United States) Nate Robinson (2)	New York Knicks (3)	
2010	(United States) Nate Robinson (3)	New York Knicks (4)	
2011	(United States) Blake Griffin	Los Angeles Clippers (2)	
2012	(United States) Jeremy Evans	Utah Jazz	
2013	(United States) Terrence Ross	Toronto Raptors (2)	
2014	(United States) John Wall	Washington Wizards	
2015	(United States) Zach LaVine	Minnesota Timberwolves (2)	
2016	(United States) Zach LaVine (2)	Minnesota Timberwolves (3)	
2017	(United States) Glenn Robinson III	Indiana Pacers (3)	
2018	(United States) Donovan Mitchell	Utah Jazz (2)	
2019	(United States) Hamidou Diallo	Oklahoma City Thunder	
2020	(United States) Derrick Jones Jr.	Miami Heat (3)	
2021	(United States) Anfernee Simons	Portland Trail Blazers	
2022	(United States) Obi Toppin	New York Knicks (5)	
2023	(United States) Mac McClung	Philadelphia 76ers	
2024	(United States) Mac McClung (2)	Osceola Magic	
2025	(United States) Mac McClung (3)	Orlando Magic (2)	
2026	(United States) Keshad Johnson	Miami Heat (4)	

== Multiple-time winners ==
Rank	Player	Team	Times won	Years
1	Nate Robinson	New York Knicks	3	2006, 2009, 2010
1	Mac McClung	Philadelphia 76ers (1) / Orlando Magic (2)	3	2023, 2024, 2025
3	Michael Jordan	Chicago Bulls	2	1987, 1988
3	Dominique Wilkins	Atlanta Hawks	2	1985, 1990
3	Harold Miner	Miami Heat	2	1993, 1995
3	Jason Richardson	Golden State Warriors	2	2002, 2003
3	Zach LaVine	Minnesota Timberwolves	2	2015, 2016

Slam Dunk Contest champions by franchise

No.	Franchise	Last Time
5	New York Knicks	2022
4	Atlanta Hawks	2005
4	Miami Heat	2026
3	Orlando Magic	2025
3	Indiana Pacers	2017
3	Minnesota Timberwolves	2016
2	Oklahoma City Thunder	2019
2	Utah Jazz	2018
2	Toronto Raptors	2013
2	Los Angeles Clippers	2011
2	Boston Celtics	2007
2	Golden State Warriors	2003
2	Phoenix Suns	1992
2	Chicago Bulls	1988
1	Philadelphia 76ers	2023
1	Portland Trail Blazers	2021
1	Washington Wizards	2014
1	Los Angeles Lakers	1997
1	Brooklyn Nets	1976

== All-time participants ==
Bold denotes winner(s) of that year.

- Mahmoud Abdul-Rauf: 1993
- Ray Allen: 1997
- Chris Andersen: 2004, 2005
- Greg Anderson: 1988
- Nick Anderson: 1992
- Giannis Antetokounmpo: 2015
- Cole Anthony: 2022
- Darrell Armstrong: 1996
- Stacey Augmon: 1992
- Harrison Barnes: 2014
- Brent Barry: **1996**
- Will Barton: 2016
- Kenny Battle: 1990
- Jonathan Bender: 2001
- David Benoit: 1993
- Eric Bledsoe: 2013
- Miles Bridges: 2019
- Dee Brown: **1991**
- Jaylen Brown: 2024
- Shannon Brown: 2010
- Carter Bryant: 2026
- Kobe Bryant: **1997**
- Chase Budinger: 2012
- Matas Buzelis: 2025
- Chris Carr: 1997
- Vince Carter: **2000**
- Stephon Castle: 2025
- Cedric Ceballos: **1992**, 1993
- Tom Chambers: 1987
- Rex Chapman: 1990, 1991
- Doug Christie: 1996
- John Collins: 2019
- Michael Cooper: 1984
- Pat Connaughton: 2020
- Antonio Davis: 1994
- Baron Davis: 2001
- Ricky Davis: 2000, 2004
- Johnny Dawkins: 1987
- DeMar DeRozan: 2010, 2011
- Hamidou Diallo: **2019**
- Clyde Drexler: 1984, 1985, 1987, 1988, 1989
- Andre Drummond: 2016
- Tony Dumas: 1995
- Blue Edwards: 1991
- Julius Erving: 1984, 1985
- Jeremy Evans: **2012**, 2013
- Rudy Fernández: 2009
- Michael Finley: 1996, 1997
- Steve Francis: 2000, 2002
- Rudy Gay: 2008, 2009
- Paul George: 2012, 2014
- Kendall Gill: 1991
- Aaron Gordon: 2016, 2017, 2020
- Gerald Green: **2007**, 2008, 2013
- Jalen Green: 2022
- Blake Griffin: **2011**
- Darrell Griffith: 1984, 1985
- Darvin Ham: 1997
- Ron Harper: 1987, 1989
- Antonio Harvey: 1995
- Jaxson Hayes: 2026
- Roy Hinson: 1986
- Allan Houston: 1994
- Dwight Howard: 2007, **2008**, 2009, 2020
- Larry Hughes: 2000
- Serge Ibaka: 2011
- Andre Iguodala: 2006
- Andre Jackson Jr.: 2025
- Jaime Jaquez Jr.: 2024
- Richard Jefferson: 2003
- Keshad Johnson: **2026**
- Larry Johnson: 1992
- Derrick Jones Jr.: 2017, **2020**
- Edgar Jones: 1984
- Fred Jones: **2004**
- Shelton Jones: 1989
- DeAndre Jordan: 2017
- Michael Jordan: 1985, **1987**, **1988**
- Shawn Kemp: 1990, 1991, 1992, 1994
- Jerome Kersey: 1986, 1987, 1988, 1989
- Zach LaVine: **2015**, **2016**
- Damian Lillard: 2014
- Corey Maggette: 2001
- Kenyon Martin Jr.: 2023
- Desmond Mason: **2001**, 2002, 2003
- Mac McClung: **2023**, **2024**, **2025**
- JaVale McGee: 2011
- Tracy McGrady: 2000
- Ben McLemore: 2014
- Harold Miner: **1993**, **1995**
- Greg Minor: 1996
- Donovan Mitchell: **2018**
- Jamario Moon: 2008
- Chris Morris: 1989
- Trey Murphy III: 2023
- Larry Nance: **1984**, 1985
- Larry Nance Jr.: 2018
- Victor Oladipo: 2015, 2018
- Robert Pack: 1994
- Tim Perry: 1989, 1993, 1995
- Scottie Pippen: 1990
- Mason Plumlee: 2015
- Paul Pressey: 1986
- Jase Richardson: 2026
- Jason Richardson: **2002**, **2003**, 2004
- Isaiah Rider: **1994**, 1995
- Glenn Robinson III: **2017**
- James Robinson: 1994
- Nate Robinson: **2006**, 2007, **2009**, **2010**
- Terrence Ross: **2013**, 2014
- Ralph Sampson: 1984
- Anfernee Simons: **2021**
- Jericho Sims: 2023
- Dennis Smith Jr.: 2018, 2019
- J. R. Smith: 2005, 2009
- Josh Smith: **2005**, 2006
- Kenny Smith: 1990, 1991, 1993
- Otis Smith: 1988, 1991
- Jerry Stackhouse: 1996, 2000
- Cassius Stanley: 2021
- Terence Stansbury: 1985, 1986, 1987
- John Starks: 1992
- DeShawn Stevenson: 2001
- Amar'e Stoudemire: 2003, 2005
- Bob Sura: 1997
- Stromile Swift: 2001
- Tyrus Thomas: 2007
- Billy Thompson: 1990
- Jacob Toppin: 2024
- Obi Toppin: 2021, **2022**
- Juan Toscano-Anderson: 2022
- Terry Tyler: 1986
- Kenny "Sky" Walker: **1989**, 1990
- John Wall: **2014**
- Gerald Wallace: 2002, 2010
- Hakim Warrick: 2006
- Jamie Watson: 1995
- Clarence Weatherspoon: 1993
- Spud Webb: **1986**, 1988, 1989
- Doug West: 1992
- Dominique Wilkins: 1984, **1985**, 1986, 1988, **1990**
- Gerald Wilkins: 1986, 1987
- Derrick Williams: 2012
- Kenny Williams: 1991
- Orlando Woolridge: 1984, 1985

== All-time results ==
=== 1980s ===
1984

Player	First round	Semifinals	Finals
Larry Nance (Phoenix)	134 (44+44+46)	140 (49+48+43)	134 (48+39+47)
Julius Erving (Philadelphia)	134 (39+47+48)	140 (44+49+47)	122 (47+25+50)
Dominique Wilkins (Atlanta)	135 (47+39+49)	137 (48+48+41)	
Darrell Griffith (Utah)	121 (39+40+42)	108 (42+42+24)	
Edgar Jones (San Antonio)	118 (32+43+43)		
Ralph Sampson (Houston)	118 (37+40+41)		
Orlando Woolridge (Chicago)	116 (23+45+48)		
Clyde Drexler (Portland)	108 (40+24+44)		
Michael Cooper (L.A. Lakers)	70 (24+24+22)		

1985

Player	First round	Semifinals	Finals
Dominique Wilkins (Atlanta)	145 (47+49+49)	140 (48+45+47)	147 (47+50+50)
Michael Jordan (Chicago)	130 (44+42+42)	142 (45+47+50)	136 (43+44+49)
Terence Stansbury (Indiana)	130 (46+50+34)	136 (49+48+39)	
Julius Erving (Philadelphia)	BYE^{a}	132 (43+44+45)	
Larry Nance (Phoenix)	BYE^{a}	131 (42+47+42)	
Darrell Griffith (Utah)	126 (38+42+46)		
Orlando Woolridge (Chicago)	124 (40+43+41)		
Clyde Drexler (Portland)	122 (39+39+44)		

^{a}Erving and Nance received first-round byes as they were the finalists from the previous year.

1986

Player	First round	Semifinals	Finals
Spud Webb (Atlanta)	141 (46+48+47)	138 (50+42+46)	100 (50+50)
Dominique Wilkins (Atlanta)	BYE^{a}	138 (46+47+45)	98 (50+48)
Terence Stansbury (Indiana)	129^{b} (34+47+48)	132 (44+39+49)	
Gerald Wilkins (New York)	133 (44+50+39)	87 (37+25+25)	
Jerome Kersey (Portland)	129 (39+43+47)		
Paul Pressey (Milwaukee)	116 (44+35+37)		
Roy Hinson (Cleveland)	112 (35+39+38)		
Terry Tyler (Sacramento)	110 (37+36+37)		

^{a}Wilkins received a first-round bye as he was the previous year's champion.
^{b}Stansbury defeated Kersey in a dunk-off to break their tie.

1987

Player	First round	Semifinals	Finals
Michael Jordan (Chicago)	88 (41+47)	148 (49+49+50)	146 (48+48+50)
Jerome Kersey (Portland)	92 (48+44)	147 (50+48+49)	140 (46+45+49)
Terence Stansbury (Seattle)	99 (49+50)	144 (49+45+50)	
Clyde Drexler (Portland)	92 (45+47)	136 (46+45+45)	
Ron Harper (Cleveland)	83 (45+38)		
Johnny Dawkins (San Antonio)	81 (37+44)		
Tom Chambers (Seattle)	62 (41+21)		
Gerald Wilkins (New York)	62 (41+21)		

1988
Ron Harper (Cleveland) was to participate but withdrew due to injury.

Player	First round	Semifinals	Finals
Michael Jordan (Chicago)	94 (47+47)	145 (50+48+47)	147 (50+47+50)
Dominique Wilkins (Atlanta)	96 (49+47)	143 (49+47+47)	145 (50+50+45)
Clyde Drexler (Portland)	88 (44+44)	133 (45+42+46)	
Otis Smith (Golden State)	87 (40+47)	109 (45+22+42)	
Jerome Kersey (Portland)	79 (41+38)		
Greg Anderson (San Antonio)	76 (42+34)		
Spud Webb (Atlanta)	52 (34+18)		

1989

Player	First round	Semifinals	Finals
Kenny "Sky" Walker (New York)	91.3 (42.5+48.8)	96.4 (46.9+49.5)	148.1 (48.9+49.6+49.6)
Clyde Drexler (Portland)	93.7 (46.6+47.1)	95.0 (47.3+47.7)	49.5 (24.5+25.0+ 0.0^{a})
Spud Webb (Atlanta)	94.5 (46.8+47.7)	91.8 (47.8+44.0)	
Shelton Jones (Philadelphia)	89.5 (44.1+45.4)	90.6 (45.7+44.9)	
Tim Perry (Phoenix)	89.4 (44.4+45.0)		
Jerome Kersey (Portland)	88.9 (44.9+44.0)		
Ron Harper (Cleveland)	88.5 (41.7+46.8)		
Chris Morris (New Jersey)	83.2 (41.1+42.1)		

^{a} Drexler did not attempt his final dunk, as victory was out of reach.

=== 1990s ===
1990

Player	First round	Semifinals	Finals
Dominique Wilkins (Atlanta)	96.3 (48.1+48.2)	97.7 (48.0+49.7)	146.8 (47.9+49.7+49.2)
Kenny Smith (Sacramento)	93.0 (43.4+49.6)	98.3 (49.1+49.2)	145.1 (48.1+49.8+47.2)
Kenny "Sky" Walker (New York)	95.2 (47.0+48.2)	97.4 (49.5+47.9)	
Shawn Kemp (Seattle)	98.2 (49.1+49.1)	96.4 (47.6+48.8)	
Scottie Pippen (Chicago)	92.2 (47.2+45.0)		
Rex Chapman (Charlotte)	92.1 (45.5+46.6)		
Billy Thompson (Miami)	91.4 (47.7+43.7)		
Kenny Battle (Phoenix)	85.8 (42.5+42.8)		

1991
Beginning with this year, final round competitors were allowed three dunks, with the two highest scores comprising the total.

Player	First round	Semifinals	Finals
Dee Brown (Boston)	92.4 (48.2+44.2)	98.0 (49.6+48.4)	97.7 (48.1+49.6–46.4)
Shawn Kemp (Seattle)	95.8 (47.6+48.2)	95.6 (48.3+47.3)	93.7 (48.0+45.7–44.3)
Rex Chapman (Charlotte)	95.2 (45.5+49.7)	94.0 (48.0+46.0)	
Kenny Smith (Houston)	90.8 (48.5+42.3)	87.9 (46.6+41.3)	
Kenny Williams (Indiana)	86.9 (42.3+44.6)		
Blue Edwards (Utah)	84.3 (40.1+44.2)		
Otis Smith (Orlando)	83.0 (41.2+41.8)		
Kendall Gill (Charlotte)	81.0 (40.1+40.9)		

1992

Player	First round	Semifinals	Finals
Cedric Ceballos (Phoenix)	85.4 (43.1+42.3)	90.4 (45.7+44.7)	97.2 (47.2+50.0–43.3)
Larry Johnson (Charlotte)	98.0 (48.6+49.4)	98.0 (49.6+48.4)	66.0 (33.5+32.5–0.0^{a})
Nick Anderson (Orlando)	88.6 (47.4+41.2)	89.8 (46.0+43.8)	
John Starks (New York)	89.6 (42.6+47.0)	87.9 (43.1+44.8)	
Doug West (Minnesota)	84.1 (44.3+39.8)		
Shawn Kemp (Seattle)	81.4 (47.4+34.0)		
Stacey Augmon (Atlanta)	79.5 (44.7+34.8)		

^{a} Johnson did not attempt his final dunk, as victory was out of reach.

1993
The two highest score dunks of three in each round constituted the competitor's score.
Shawn Kemp (Seattle) was scheduled to compete but was injured.

Player	First round	Finals
Harold Miner (Miami)	94.8 (49.0+45.8–45.8)	97.4 (48.0+49.4–47.0)
Clarence Weatherspoon (Philadelphia)	87.5 (43.2+44.3–38.5)	92.2 (44.7+47.5–27.5)
Cedric Ceballos (Phoenix)	87.3 (42.3+45.1–22.5)	79.8 (42.3+37.5–24.5)
David Benoit (Utah)	85.8 (41.5+44.3–28.5)	
Kenny Smith (Houston)	85.0 (46.5+38.5–26.5)	
Mahmoud Abdul-Rauf (Denver)	80.8 (38.0+42.8–26.0)	
Tim Perry (Philadelphia)	70.0 (38.5+31.5–22.0)	

1994
In the first round, each competitor was allowed 90 seconds to do as many dunks as he chooses with one overall score. The final round score was the best of two dunks.

Player	First round	Finals
Isaiah Rider (Minnesota)	46.8	49.0, 47.0
Robert Pack (Denver)	42.0	43.8, 25.0
Shawn Kemp (Seattle)	46.6	25.0, 25.0
Allan Houston (Detroit)	41.5	
Antonio Davis (Indiana)	40.0	
James Robinson (Portland)	39.0	

1995
This year, each competitor was allowed 90 seconds to do at least three dunks and then given an overall score in round one. In the final round, each competitor was allowed 60 seconds to do at least two dunks and then given an overall score.

Player	First round	Finals
Harold Miner (Miami)	49.2	46.0
Isaiah Rider (Minnesota)	44.6	34.0
Jamie Watson (Utah)	40.4	26.0
Antonio Harvey (L.A. Lakers)	35.2	
Tim Perry (Philadelphia)	31.0	
Tony Dumas (Dallas)	15.0	

1996
Beginning this year, in the first round, each competitor was allowed 90 seconds to do as many dunks as he chooses with one overall score. The final round score was the best of two dunks.

Player	First round	Finals
Brent Barry (L.A. Clippers)	45.5	8.0, 49.0
Michael Finley (Phoenix)	45.0	7.0, 46.2
Greg Minor (Boston)	41.0	2.0, 40.0
Jerry Stackhouse (Philadelphia)	40.0	
Doug Christie (New York)	39.5	
Darrell Armstrong (Orlando)	25.5	

1997

Player	First round	Finals
Kobe Bryant (L.A. Lakers)	37	49
Chris Carr (Minnesota)	44	45
Michael Finley (Dallas)	39	33
Ray Allen (Milwaukee)	35	
Bob Sura (Cleveland)	35	
Darvin Ham (Denver)	36	

1998
No competition was held.

1999
No competition was held as All-Star Weekend was not held due to the NBA's lockout.

=== 2000s ===
2000
Beginning with this year, the two highest dunks in each round constituted the competitor's total score.

Player	First round	Finals
Vince Carter (Toronto)	100 (50,49,50)	98 (50+48)
Steve Francis (Houston)	95 (45,50,32)	91 (43+48)
Tracy McGrady (Toronto)	99 (45,49,50)	77 (45+32)
Ricky Davis (Charlotte)	88 (40,32,48)	
Jerry Stackhouse (Detroit)	83 (41,36,42)	
Larry Hughes (Philadelphia)	67 (30,30,37)	

2001

Player	First round	Finals
Desmond Mason (Seattle)	91 (42+49)	89 (45+44)
DeShawn Stevenson (Utah)	95 (46+49)	85 (38+47)
Baron Davis (Charlotte)	94 (45+49)	77 (44+33)
Stromile Swift (Vancouver)	90 (45+45)	
Jonathan Bender (Indiana)	90 (46+44)	
Corey Maggette (L.A. Clippers)	88 (46+42)	

2002
A tournament format was adopted for this year.

Semifinals
1	Desmond Mason (Seattle)	84 (41,43,36)
4	Jason Richardson (Golden State)	98 (48,31,50)
3	Steve Francis (Houston)	77 (31,40,37)
2	Gerald Wallace (Sacramento)	84 (41,43,36)

Finals
Jason Richardson	85 (36+49)
Gerald Wallace	80 (44+36)

2003

Player	First round	Finals
Jason Richardson (Golden State)	100 (50+50)	95 (45+50)
Desmond Mason (Seattle)	90 (46+44)	93 (50+43)
Amar'e Stoudemire (Phoenix)	79 (49+30)	
Richard Jefferson (New Jersey)	74 (37+37)	

2004

Player	First round	Finals
Fred Jones (Indiana)	92 (50+42)	86 (50+36)
Jason Richardson (Golden State)	95 (45+50)	78 (45+33)
Chris Andersen (Denver)	88 (42+46)	
Ricky Davis (Boston)	76 (45+31)	

2005

Player	First round	Finals
Josh Smith (Atlanta)	95 (45+50)	100 (50+50)
Amar'e Stoudemire (Phoenix)	95 (45+50)	87 (45+42)
J. R. Smith (New Orleans)	90 (45+45)	
Chris Andersen (New Orleans)	77 (41+36)	

2006

Player	First round	Finals	Tie-break
Nate Robinson (New York)	93 (49+44)	94 (44+50)	47
Andre Iguodala (Philadelphia)	95 (45+50)	94 (50+44)	46
Hakim Warrick (Memphis)	86 (44+42)		
Josh Smith (Atlanta)	81 (41+40)		

2007

Player	First round	Finals
Gerald Green (Boston)	95 (48+47)	91 (41+50)
Nate Robinson (New York)	90 (45+45)	80 (39+41)
Dwight Howard (Orlando)	85 (43+42)	
Tyrus Thomas (Chicago)	80 (37+43)	

2008
The final round was decided by fan voting via text messaging for the first time.

Player	First round	Finals
Dwight Howard (Orlando)	100 (50+50)	78%
Gerald Green (Minnesota)	91 (46+45)	22%
Jamario Moon (Toronto)	90 (46+44)	
Rudy Gay (Memphis)	85 (37+48)	

2009
The final round was decided by fan voting via text messaging.

Player	First round	Finals
Nate Robinson (New York)	87 (46+41)	52%
Dwight Howard (Orlando)	100 (50+50)	48%
J. R. Smith (Denver)	85 (43+42)	
Rudy Fernández (Portland)	84 (42+42)	

=== 2010s ===
2010
The final round was decided by fan voting via text messaging.

Player	First round	Finals
Nate Robinson (New York)	89 (44+45)	51%
DeMar DeRozan (Toronto)	92 (42+50)	49%
Gerald Wallace (Charlotte)	78 (38+40)	
Shannon Brown (L.A. Lakers)	78 (37+41)	

2011
The final round was decided by fan voting via text messaging.

Player	First round	Finals
Blake Griffin (L.A. Clippers)	95 (49+46)	68%
JaVale McGee (Washington)	99 (50+49)	32%
DeMar DeRozan (Toronto)	94 (44+50)	
Serge Ibaka (Oklahoma)	90 (45+45)	

2012
The format for this season was changed so that each participant had 3 dunks, and the results would be entirely decided by fan voting online, via text messaging, and (for the first time) via Twitter.

Player	Voting results
Jeremy Evans (Utah)	29%
Chase Budinger (Houston)	28%
Paul George (Indiana)	24%
Derrick Williams (Minnesota)	19%

2013
The final round was decided by fan voting via text messaging.

Player	First round	Finals
Terrence Ross (Toronto)	99 (50+49)	58%
Jeremy Evans (Utah)	90 (47+43)	42%
Eric Bledsoe (L.A. Clippers)	89 (39+50)	
Kenneth Faried (Denver)	89 (39+50)	
Gerald Green (Indiana)	83 (50+33)	
James White (New York)	77 (45+32)	

2014
A team format was adopted this year. The first round was a Freestyle Round, with the winning team choosing the order of dunkers for the Battle Round. The Battle Round was then composed of one-on-one "battles", with the first team to three victories being the champion.

John Wall was voted Dunker of the Night.

Freestyle Round
Division	Members	Result
East	Paul George, Indiana Pacers; Terrence Ross, Toronto Raptors; John Wall, Washington Wizards	Won
West	Harrison Barnes, Golden State Warriors; Damian Lillard, Portland Trail Blazers; Ben McLemore, Sacramento Kings	Lost

Battle Round
Division	Player	Result
East	Terrence Ross, Toronto Raptors	Won
West	Damian Lillard, Portland Trail Blazers	Lost
East	Paul George, Indiana Pacers	Won
West	Harrison Barnes, Golden State Warriors	Lost
East	John Wall, Washington Wizards	Won
West	Ben McLemore, Sacramento Kings	Lost

2015
This year saw the return of the voting style that was last used in 2007.

Player	First round	Finals
Zach LaVine (Minnesota)	100 (50+50)	94 (45+49)
Victor Oladipo (Orlando)	89 (50+39)	75 (31+44)
Mason Plumlee (Brooklyn)	76 (40+36)	
Giannis Antetokounmpo (Milwaukee)	65 (30+35)	

2016

Player	First round	Finals	Tie-break 1	Tie-break 2
Zach LaVine (Minnesota)	99 (50+49)	100 (50+50)	50	50
Aaron Gordon (Orlando)	94 (45+49)	100 (50+50)	50	47
Andre Drummond (Detroit)	75 (36+39)			
Will Barton (Denver)	74 (44+30)			

2017

Player	First round	Finals
Glenn Robinson III (Indiana)	91 (50+41)	94 (44+50)
Derrick Jones Jr. (Phoenix)	95 (45+50)	87 (37+50)
DeAndre Jordan (L.A. Clippers)	84 (41+43)	
Aaron Gordon (Orlando)	72 (38+34)	

2018

Player	First round	Finals
Donovan Mitchell (Utah)	98 (48+50)	98 (50+48)
Larry Nance Jr. (Cleveland)	93 (44+49)	96 (46+50)
Dennis Smith Jr. (Dallas)	89 (39+50)	
Victor Oladipo (Indiana)	71 (31+40)	

2019

Player	First round	Finals
Hamidou Diallo (Oklahoma City)	98 (48+50)	88 (43+45)
Dennis Smith Jr. (New York)	95 (45+50)	85 (35+50)
Miles Bridges (Charlotte)	83 (33+50)	
John Collins (Atlanta)	82 (40+42)	

=== 2020s ===
2020

Player	First round	Finals	Tie-break 1	Tie-break 2
Derrick Jones Jr. (Miami)	96 (46+50)	100 (50+50)	50	48
Aaron Gordon (Orlando)	100 (50+50)	100 (50+50)	50	47
Pat Connaughton (Milwaukee)	95 (45+50)			
Dwight Howard (L.A. Lakers)	90 (41+49)			

2021
The final round was decided by judges.

Player	First round	Finals
Anfernee Simons (Portland)	95 (46+49)	3
Obi Toppin (New York)	94 (48+46)	2
Cassius Stanley (Indiana)	81 (44+37)	DNQ

2022

Player	First round	Finals
Obi Toppin (New York)	90 (44+46)	92 (45+47)
Juan Toscano-Anderson (Golden State)	87 (44+43)	69 (39+30)
Jalen Green (Houston)	83 (38+45)	
Cole Anthony (Orlando)	70 (40+30)	

2023

Player	First round	Finals
Mac McClung (Philadelphia)	99.8 (50+49.8)	100 (50+50)
Trey Murphy III (New Orleans)	96 (46.6+49.4)	98 (48.8+49.2)
Jericho Sims (New York)	95.4 (47.6+47.8)	
Kenyon Martin Jr. (Houston)	93.2 (46+47.2)	

2024

Player	First round	Finals
Mac McClung (Orlando)	97.4 (48+49.4)	98.8 (48.8+50)
Jaylen Brown (Boston)	96.4 (48.8+47.6)	97.8 (48.6+49.2)
Jaime Jaquez (Miami)	94.2 (47.4+46.8)	
Jacob Toppin (New York)	95.0 (47.8+47.2)	

2025

Player	First round	Finals
Mac McClung (Orlando)	100 (50.0+50.0)	100 (50.0+50.0)
Stephon Castle (San Antonio)	94.4 (47.2+47.4)	99.6 (49.6+50.0)
Andre Jackson Jr. (Milwaukee)	88.8 (43.8+45.0)	
Matas Buzelis (Chicago)	87.4 (40.0+47.4)	

2026

Player	First round	Finals
Keshad Johnson (Miami)	92.8 (47.4+45.4)	97.4 (49.6+47.8)
Carter Bryant (San Antonio)	94.8 (45.6+49.2)	93.0 (50.0+43.0)
Jaxson Hayes (L.A. Lakers)	91.8 (44.6+47.2)	
Jase Richardson (Orlando)	88.8 (45.4+43.4)	

== Criticism and controversies ==
Historically, the dunk contest drew some mild criticisms. One is that players who often compete in these contests are seen as dunkers only (with the notable exceptions of Michael Jordan, Kobe Bryant, and Julius Erving), which is why notable high flying athletes like Shawn Marion and LeBron James have sometimes refused to participate. High-profile players such as Dwyane Wade and Charles Barkley have also declined to participate citing it as an unnecessary risk to injury. In the 1995 NBA Slam Dunk Contest, Tony Dumas hurt his knee while performing his "Texas Twister" dunk. and in the 2000 NBA Slam Dunk Contest, Tracy McGrady injured his wrist while performing a dunk. Although a longtime critic, LeBron James said he would perform in the 2010 Slam Dunk Contest. This decision was made after watching the 2009 dunk contest when Dwight Howard and Nate Robinson went at it. However, he withdrew his statement once the All-Star Weekend came around.

The 2006 NBA Slam Dunk Competition between Nate Robinson and Andre Iguodala drew much criticism because players were not penalized for missing a dunk attempt. Consequently, Robinson attempted a single dunk 14 times before completing it. Prior to the 2007 competition, the NBA changed a few rules to prevent excessive dunk attempts. Each participant has two minutes to complete their dunk (with a maximum of 3 attempts). At the end of the two minutes allotted, they then have their number of dunk attempts limited to one.

=== Authenticity ===
Many people, including 2010 winner Nate Robinson, thought that the 2011 contest was rigged to allow up-and-coming star Blake Griffin to win and that runner-up JaVale McGee deserved to win. It was even disputed if Griffin even legitimately qualified for the finals since his final dunk got a perfect score but was basically a copy of DeMar DeRozan's first dunk with a lower degree of difficulty. Ben Maller of Fox Sports Radio reported that the NBA issued a media advisory over an hour before the 2011 Slam Dunk Contest began, referring to Blake Griffin as the winner.

== Records ==
- Mac McClung in his 2025 victory became the only competitor in history to have a perfect dunk contest, scoring all 50s from all judges on all of his dunks.
- Zach LaVine posted the highest score in any round with 200 in the 2016 final round, as well as the best overall score with 299 points.
- 38 players have scored at least one perfect 50 on an individual dunk: (95 Times) Julius Erving, Terence Stansbury, Michael Jordan, Dominique Wilkins, Gerald Wilkins, Spud Webb, Jerome Kersey, Cedric Ceballos, Vince Carter, Steve Francis, Tracy McGrady, Jason Richardson, Desmond Mason, Fred Jones, Josh Smith, Amar'e Stoudemire, Andre Iguodala, Nate Robinson, Gerald Green, Dwight Howard, DeMar DeRozan, JaVale McGee, Terrence Ross, Eric Bledsoe, Kenneth Faried, Zach LaVine, Victor Oladipo, Aaron Gordon, Glenn Robinson III, Derrick Jones Jr., Donovan Mitchell, Larry Nance Jr., Dennis Smith Jr., Hamidou Diallo, Miles Bridges, Pat Connaughton, Mac McClung, Stephon Castle, and Carter Bryant.
- Aaron Gordon and Mac McClung hold the record with eight perfect 50s, followed by Zach LaVine with seven, Michael Jordan, Dominique Wilkins, and Jason Richardson with five, Derrick Jones Jr. and Dwight Howard with four, and Vince Carter with three.
- Michael Jordan, Jason Richardson, Nate Robinson, Zach LaVine, and Mac McClung are the only players to win the NBA Slam Dunk Contest back-to-back.
- Michael Jordan, Isaiah Rider, Kobe Bryant, Brent Barry and Dwight Howard are the only players to have won an NBA championship and a slam dunk championship.
- Kobe Bryant is the youngest player to win the slam dunk contest at the age of 18, while Dominique Wilkins is the oldest player to win the slam dunk contest at the age of 30.
- At 5 feet 7 inches (1.70 m), Spud Webb is the shortest player to win the NBA slam dunk contest.
- Ralph Sampson, at 7 feet 4 inches (2.24 m), is the tallest player to compete in the dunk contest, while Dwight Howard is the tallest winner, at 6 feet 11 inches (2.11 m).
- Nate Robinson and Mac McClung are the only players to win the contest three times. Mac McClung is the only player to win the contest three years in a row.
- The 2006 NBA Slam Dunk Competition between Nate Robinson and Andre Iguodala was the first time that the competition had to go into a sudden-death dunk-off.
- In 1996, Greg Minor of the Boston Celtics received the lowest individual score for a single dunk, with a 2.0 for a missed first attempt. Due to new rules where the minimum score you can receive for a dunk is a 40, as of 2026 it is statistically impossible for this record to be broken.
- Spud Webb became the first rookie to win a slam dunk title. He was followed by Dee Brown, Harold Miner, Isaiah Rider, Brent Barry, Kobe Bryant, Desmond Mason, Jason Richardson, Josh Smith, Nate Robinson, Terrence Ross, Zach LaVine, Donovan Mitchell, Hamidou Diallo, and Mac McClung.
- Including 1976 ABA All Star Game Dunk Contest, Julius Erving, Michael Jordan, and Kobe Bryant are the only players that won Slam Dunk Contest and NBA Most Valuable Player Award.
