= Greg Minor =

American basketball player (born 1971)

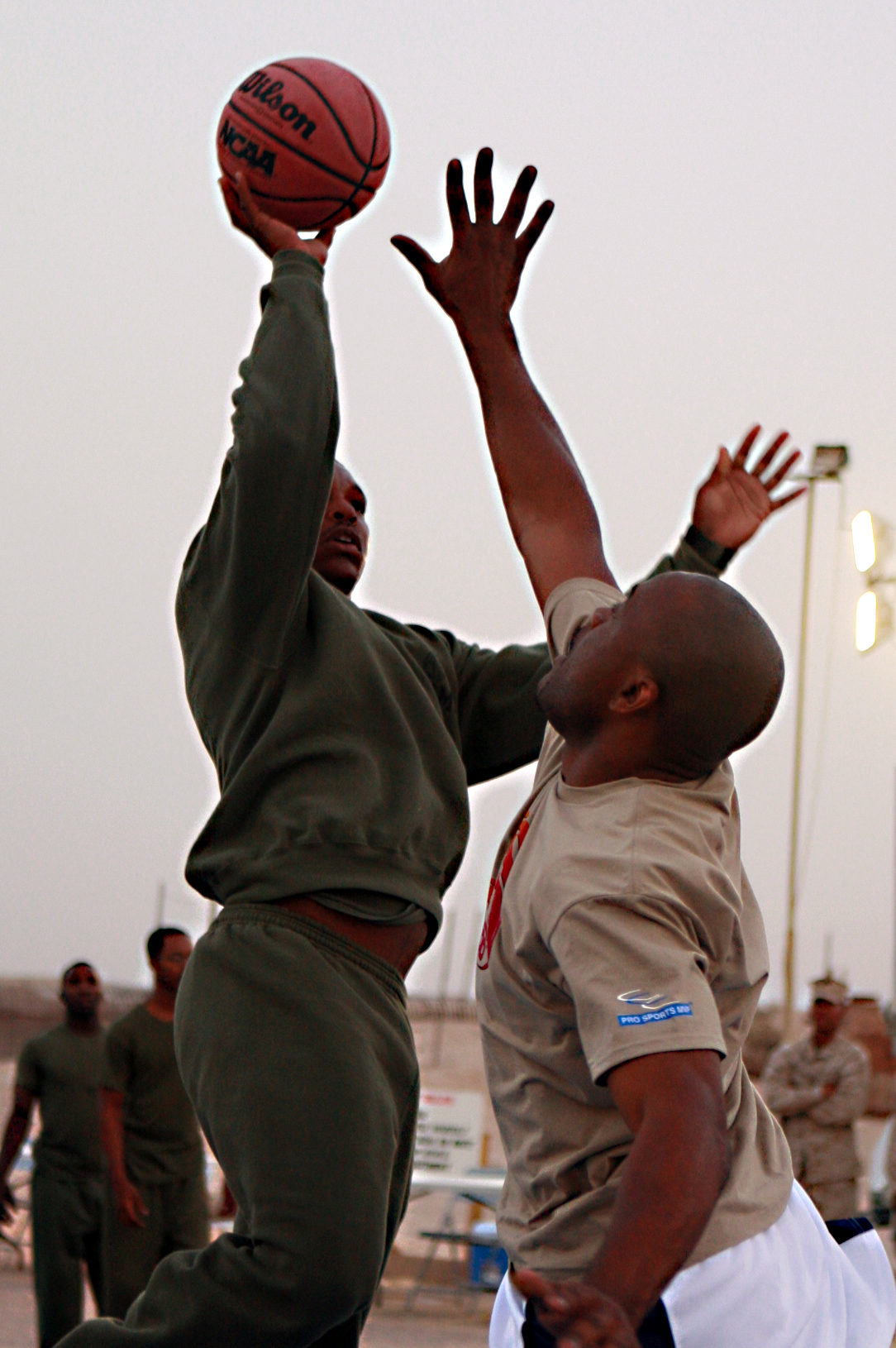
- Minor (right) playing basketball with a U.S. Marine

Personal information
- Born: September 18, 1971 (age 55) Sandersville, Georgia, U.S.
- Listed height: 6 ft 6 in (1.98 m)
- Listed weight: 210 lb (95 kg)

Career information
- High school: Washington (Sandersville, Georgia)
- College: Louisville (1991–1994)
- NBA draft: 1994: 1st round, 25th overall pick
- Drafted by: Los Angeles Clippers
- Playing career: 1994–2002
- Position: Small forward / shooting guard
- Number: 9

Career history
- 1994–1999: Boston Celtics

Career highlights
- Third-team Parade All-American (1990)

Career NBA statistics
- Points: 1,902 (6.9 ppg)
- Rebounds: 741 (2.7 rpg)
- Assists: 384 (1.4 apg)
- Stats at NBA.com
- Stats at Basketball Reference

Greg Magado Minor (born September 18, 1971) is an American basketball coach and a former National Basketball Association (NBA) player who spent five seasons with the Boston Celtics. Born in Sandersville, Georgia he played basketball for Washington County High School before enrolling at the University of Louisville to play for the Cardinals. He has been an assistant coach with the NBA Development League's Tulsa 66ers, Bakersfield Jam, and Idaho Stampede.

== College career ==
Minor lost his freshman season in Louisville due to academic reasons. In his time in Louisville the school snapped two Metro Conference titles and two trips to the NCAA's Sweet Sixteen. In three seasons he averaged 12.6 points and 5.6 rebounds per game for the Cardinals.

== Professional career ==
Minor was selected by the Los Angeles Clippers as the 25th overall pick in the 1994 NBA draft. On June 30, 1994, the Clippers then traded Minor along with veteran Mark Jackson to the Indiana Pacers for Malik Sealy, Pooh Richardson, and the rights to fellow rookie Eric Piatkowski. He was released from the Pacers' roster before start of the 1994–95 NBA season, but signed as a free agent with the Boston Celtics on October 19.

Minor remained with the Celtics for the entirety of his five-year career (1994–1999), averaging 6.9 points per game and maintaining a shooting percentage of .478. During his rookie season, he scored a career-high 31 points in a home game against the Golden State Warriors on January 27, 1995. In 1996, Minor competed in the NBA Slam Dunk Contest during the All-Star Weekend in San Antonio, Texas, where he finished third overall.

Minor suffered from a career ending hip injury on April 29, 1999, during a game against the Miami Heat.

In 2001 Minor attempted a comeback and was rumoured to have been close to signing with the Sydney Kings of the Australian National Basketball League.

== Coaching career ==
Minor became the assistant coach of the Continental Basketball Association's Lawton-Fort Sill Cavalry in 2008. He worked with NBA legends Otis Birdsong, the general manager of the team, and Micheal Ray Richardson, the head coach. The Lawton-Fort Sill Cavalry won the CBA Championship that year.

On September 25, 2008, the Oklahoma City Thunder added Minor as a member of the basketball operations staff for the NBA Development League affiliate the Tulsa 66ers. Minor was the assistant coach to Paul Woolpert.

On October 6, 2009, the NBA Development League's Bakersfield Jam announced that Minor would serve as an assistant coach for the 2009–10 season.

On August 11, 2010, the NBA Development League's Idaho Stampede announced that Minor was hired as an assistant coach under head coach Randy Livingston.

During the 2011-2012 basketball season, Minor became the head coach of Jiangsu Xiongshi Professional Basketball Club in the National Basketball League of China.

In September 2012, the Cleveland Cavaliers added Minor as an assistant coach to G League affiliates Canton Charge.

From 2014 to 2016 basketball seasons, Minor served as the head coach of the Jiangsu Xiongshi Professional Basketball Club in the National Basketball League of China.

== Personal ==
In 2006, he obtained a Bachelor of Science degree in Criminal Justice from the University of Phoenix. In 2007, Minor traveled to Iraq with Thurl Bailey and Shawn Bradley to meet with the troops. Minor also worked with the NBA at the Haier Academy in China in 2007 and 2009.
