= FBLA (disambiguation) =

FBLA may refer to:

- "FBLA", a song by Helmet from their 1990 album Strap It On
- "FBLA II", a song by Helmet from their 1992 album Meantime
- FBLA (Future Business Leaders of America), an international career and technical student organization
