= Arlington Christian School =

Location
- 3675 Butner Road; Atlanta, Georgia 30349; United States; 33°38′5″N 84°39′7″W

Information
- School type: Private
- Motto: "Quality Education in a Christian Environment"
- Religious affiliation: Church of Christ
- Founded: 1959
- Chairperson: Leo Wheat
- Hours in school day: 8
- Colours: Green, gold, black
- Athletics: Independent
- Mascot: Eagle
- Accreditation: Cognia />Georgia Accrediting Commission
- Website: www.arlingtonchristian.org

Arlington Christian School is a K4-12 private Christian school in Atlanta, Georgia, United States.

== History ==
Arlington Christian School was founded in 1958; they bought 22 acres (89,000 m^{2}) of land and a building by 1959. On September 14, 1959, the school opened with 140 students in grades one through nine and a staff of twelve.

Athletics at the time included soccer, basketball, and cheerleading. Since then the athletics department has grown to include softball, tennis, baseball, track and field, cross country, volleyball, and recently football. The school has also added music, drama, art, and foreign language.

With the school's rapid expansion, the need for more space became a problem, which was accommodated by a donation of land in south Fulton County. The present facilities were built, and in September 1976, the doors were opened at the new location. Two years later, a gymnasium was completed.

In 1986, the school merged with Greater Atlanta Christian Schools.

After seven years, families wanted a board and more local control of the school's operations. On July 1, 1994, the school was officially chartered as an independent entity.

In August 2000, a high school hall was added, containing eight new classrooms, a computer and science lab, and a high school office.

In 2008, Arlington celebrated its 50th anniversary.

In 2025, Arlington moved from 4500 Ridge Road Fairburn, GA to the campus of Renaissance Church of Christ located at 3675 Butner Road, Atlanta, GA 30349.

== Accreditation ==
Arlington Christian School is fully accredited by both Cognia and the Georgia Accrediting Commission (GAC), reflecting the school’s commitment to academic excellence, continuous improvement, and high educational standards.

== Academics ==
Arlington Christian School is a college preparatory school offering a diverse and rigorous academic curriculum. The school currently provides onsite dual enrollment opportunities, allowing advanced sophomores, juniors, and seniors to enroll in college courses while still completing their high school education. Through this program, students simultaneously work toward earning both their high school diploma and college credits leading toward an associate degree.

In addition, Arlington has launched a STEAM Advancement Program designed to prepare students for emerging career fields and technology-driven industries. The program includes:

Cybersecurity certification, Microsoft Office 365 training, Drone coding and piloting, Robotics, Introduction to Artificial Intelligence (AI)

This initiative reflects Arlington’s commitment to equipping students with both strong academic foundations and practical, career-ready skills for success in college and beyond.

== Extracurricular activities ==
Arlington Christian School offers a wide range of extracurricular activities designed to support student leadership, creativity, service, and personal growth. Opportunities include chorus, Beta Club, student council, book club, drama club, art club, competitive athletics, and mandatory community service participation. These programs help foster well-rounded students by encouraging teamwork, leadership development, artistic expression, and community engagement.

=== Athletics ===
Arlington Christian School currently offers a variety of competitive athletic programs designed to promote teamwork, discipline, leadership, and student development.

Girls Athletics: Volleyball, Flag Football, Basketball, Track and Field

Boys Athletics: Middle School Basketball, Junior Varsity Basketball, Varsity Basketball, Track and Field

The athletic program encourages student-athletes to excel both academically and competitively while developing character, sportsmanship, and leadership skills on and off the court and field.

- 2008-2009: Men's Basketball Class AA State Champions
- 2008-2009: Women's Basketball Class AA State Champions
- 2009-2010: Softball Class AA State Champions
- 2009-2010: Women's Basketball Class AA State Champions
- 2010-2011: Women's Basketball Class AAA State Champions
- 2016-2017: Men's Basketball Class A State Champions
- 2017-2018: Men's Basketball Class A State Champions
- 2021-2022 Men's Basketball Class AA State Champions
